= 2024 Chelyabinsk Oblast gubernatorial election =

- 7–8 September 2024
- Turnout: 48.93%
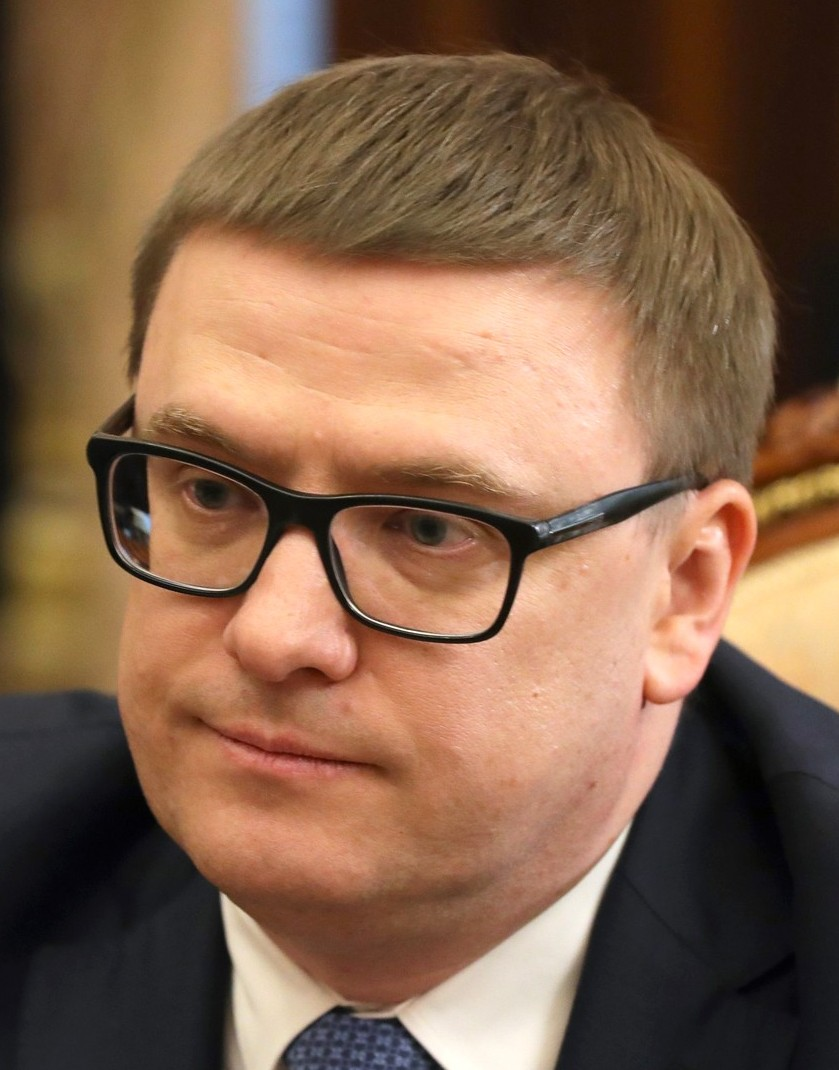

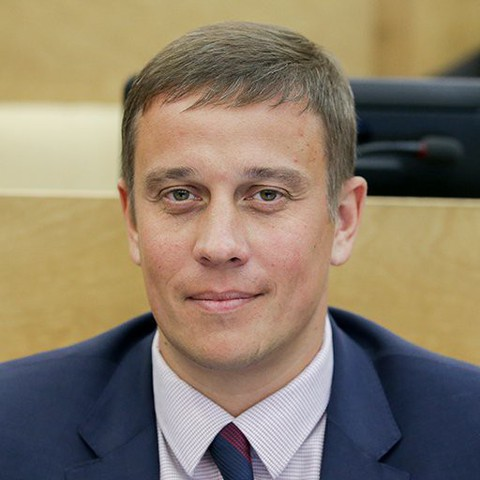
			CPRF
Candidate	Aleksey Teksler	Vitaly Pashin	Eldar Gilmutdinov
Party	United Russia	LDPR	CPRF
Popular vote	1,023,767	118,683	66,328
Percentage	81.28%	9.42%	5.27%
Governor before election
Aleksey Teksler
Independent
Governor-elect
Aleksey Teksler
United Russia

The 2024 Chelyabinsk Oblast gubernatorial election took place on 7–8 September 2024, on common election day. Incumbent Governor Aleksey Teksler was re-elected to a second term in office.

== Background ==
In March 2019 first-term Governor of Chelyabinsk Oblast Boris Dubrovsky announced his resignation and was replaced by First Deputy Minister of Energy Aleksey Teksler. Teksler was previously viewed as the likely replacement for Governor of Murmansk Oblast Marina Kovtun, who resigned two days after Teksler's appointment to Chelyabinsk Oblast. Dubrovsky's resignation was expected as in August 2018 he was indicted for conspiracy by the Federal Antimonopoly Service, Dubrovsky later fled Russia and was charged with abuse of power in October 2019.

Teksler ran for a full term as an independent and handily won the September 2019 election with 69.30% of the vote, as his nearest challenger, Konstantin Natsiyevsky (CPRF), received just 12.02%. In June 2020 Governor Teksler joined United Russia party, and later this year led the party list in the Legislative Assembly of Chelyabinsk Oblast election.

== Candidates ==
In Chelyabinsk Oblast candidates for Governor can be nominated by registered political parties or by self-nomination. Candidate for Governor of Chelyabinsk Oblast should be a Russian citizen and at least 30 years old. Candidates for Governor should not have a foreign citizenship or residence permit. Each candidate in order to be registered is required to collect at least 7% of signatures of members and heads of municipalities. In addition, self-nominated candidates should collect 0.5% of signatures of Chelyabinsk Oblast residents. Also gubernatorial candidates present 3 candidacies to the Federation Council and election winner later appoints one of the presented candidates.

=== Declared ===
Candidate name, political party		Occupation	Status	Ref.
Eldar Gilmutdinov; Communist Party		Member of Chelyabinsk City Duma (2019–present); Individual entrepreneur	Registered	
Vitaly Pashin; Liberal Democratic Party	Vitaly Pashin	Member of Legislative Assembly of Chelyabinsk Oblast (2021–present); Former Member of State Duma (2016–2021); 2014 and 2019 gubernatorial candidate	Registered	
Stepan Solovyov; Green Alternative		Deputy chairman of Green Alternative party 2024 Samara Oblast gubernatorial candidate	Registered	
Aleksey Teksler; United Russia	Aleksey Teksler	Incumbent Governor of Chelyabinsk Oblast (2019–present)	Registered	
Yaroslav Shcherbakov; Yabloko		Businessman; 2019 gubernatorial candidate	Failed to qualify	
Vladimir Medvedev; Party of Pensioners		Sales director Veteran of the Russian invasion of Ukraine	Did not file	

=== Declined ===
- Valery Gartung (SR–ZP), Member of State Duma (1997–present), Chairman of the Duma Committee on Safeguarding Competition (2021–present), 2000 gubernatorial candidate (endorsed Teksler)

=== Candidates for Federation Council ===
Incumbent Senator Margarita Pavlova (Independent) was not renominated.

Gubernatorial candidate, political party	Candidates for Federation Council	Status
Eldar Gilmutdinov; Communist Party	* Konstantin Natsiyevsky, attorney, former Member of Legislative Assembly of Chelyabinsk Oblast (2010–2014), 2014 and 2019 gubernatorial candidate * Izolda Shilova, kindergarten principal * Igor Yegorov, Member of Legislative Assembly of Chelyabinsk Oblast (2011–present)	Registered
Vitaly Pashin; Liberal Democratic Party	* Aleksey Besedin, Member of Legislative Assembly of Chelyabinsk Oblast (2015–present) * Yelena Kolyada, obstetrician-gynecologist * Yevgeny Reva, Member of Legislative Assembly of Chelyabinsk Oblast (2020–present)	Registered
Stepan Solovyov; Green Alternative	* Anatoly Kuznetsov, perennial candidate * Vitaly Volchkov, service engineer * Maria Volchkova, homemaker	Registered
Aleksey Teksler; United Russia	* Sergey Berdnikov, Mayor of Magnitogorsk (2016–present) * Natalya Kotova, Mayor of Chelyabinsk (2019–present) * Mikhail Molchan, Head of Oktyabrsky District (1996–2005, 2010–present)	Registered

== Polls ==
Fieldwork date	Polling firm	Teksler	Pashin	Gilmutdinov	Solovyov	None	Lead
7–8 September 2024	2024 election	81%	9%	5%	2%	2%	72%
6–19 August 2024	COM	67%	6%	3%	1%	2%	61%

== Results ==
Summary of the 7–8 September 2024 Chelyabinsk Oblast gubernatorial election results
Candidate	Party	Votes	%
Aleksey Teksler (incumbent)	United Russia	1,023,767	81.28
Vitaly Pashin	Liberal Democratic Party	118,683	9.42
Eldar Gilmutdinov	Communist Party	66,328	5.27
Stepan Solovyov	Green Alternative	27,343	2.17
Valid votes		1,236,121	98.14
Blank ballots		23,469	1.86
Total		1,259,594	100.00
Turnout		1,259,594	48.93
Registered voters		2,574,070	100.00

Governor Teksler appointed Chelyabinsk mayor Natalya Kotova (United Russia) to the Federation Council, replacing incumbent Senator Margarita Pavlova (Independent).

== See also ==
- 2024 Russian regional elections
