= 2025 Chelyabinsk Oblast legislative election =

Regional legislative election in Russia

- 12–14 September 2025

All 60 seats in the Legislative Assembly 31 seats needed for a majority
- Turnout: 39.90% ▲6.03 pp
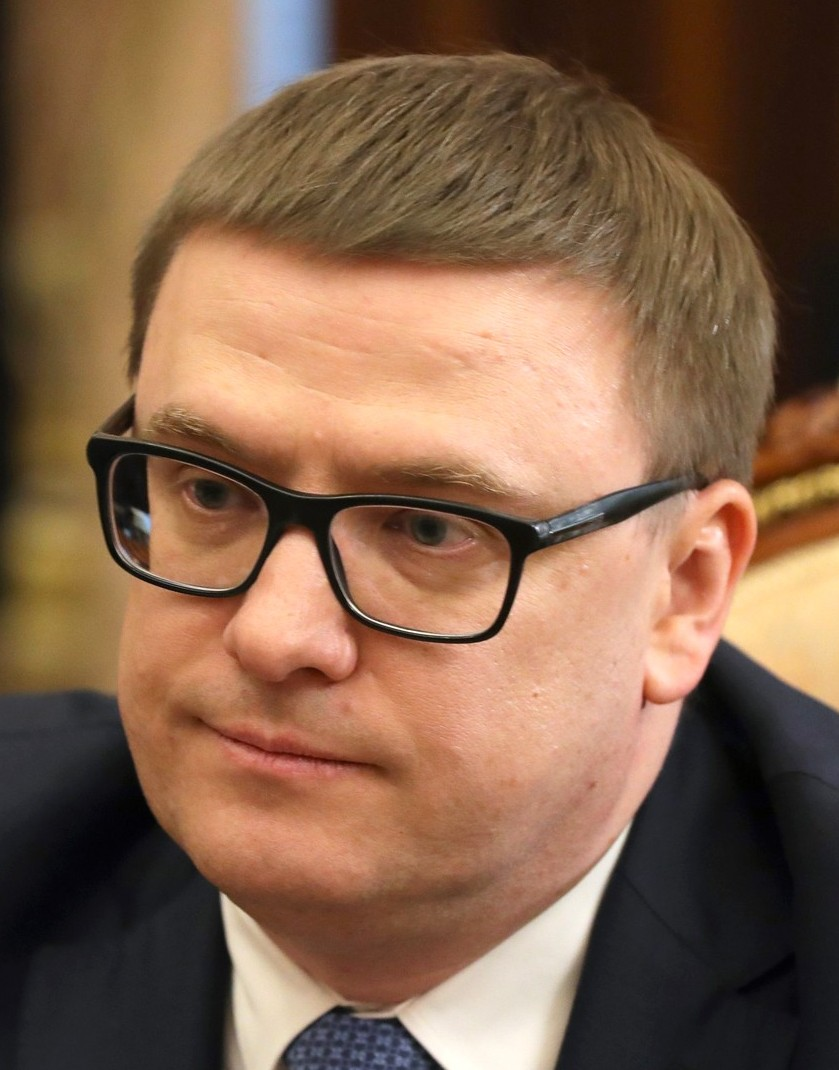

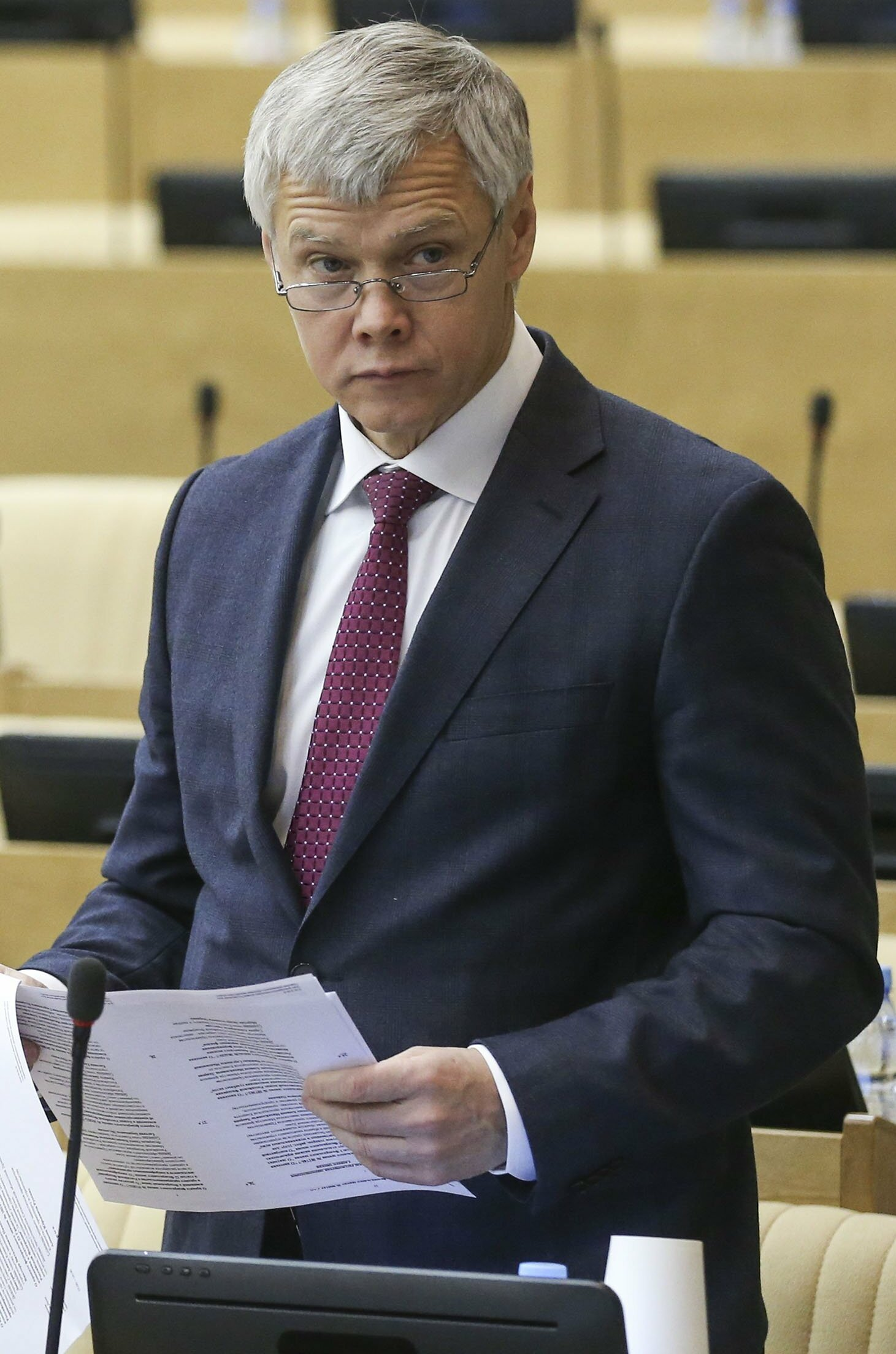

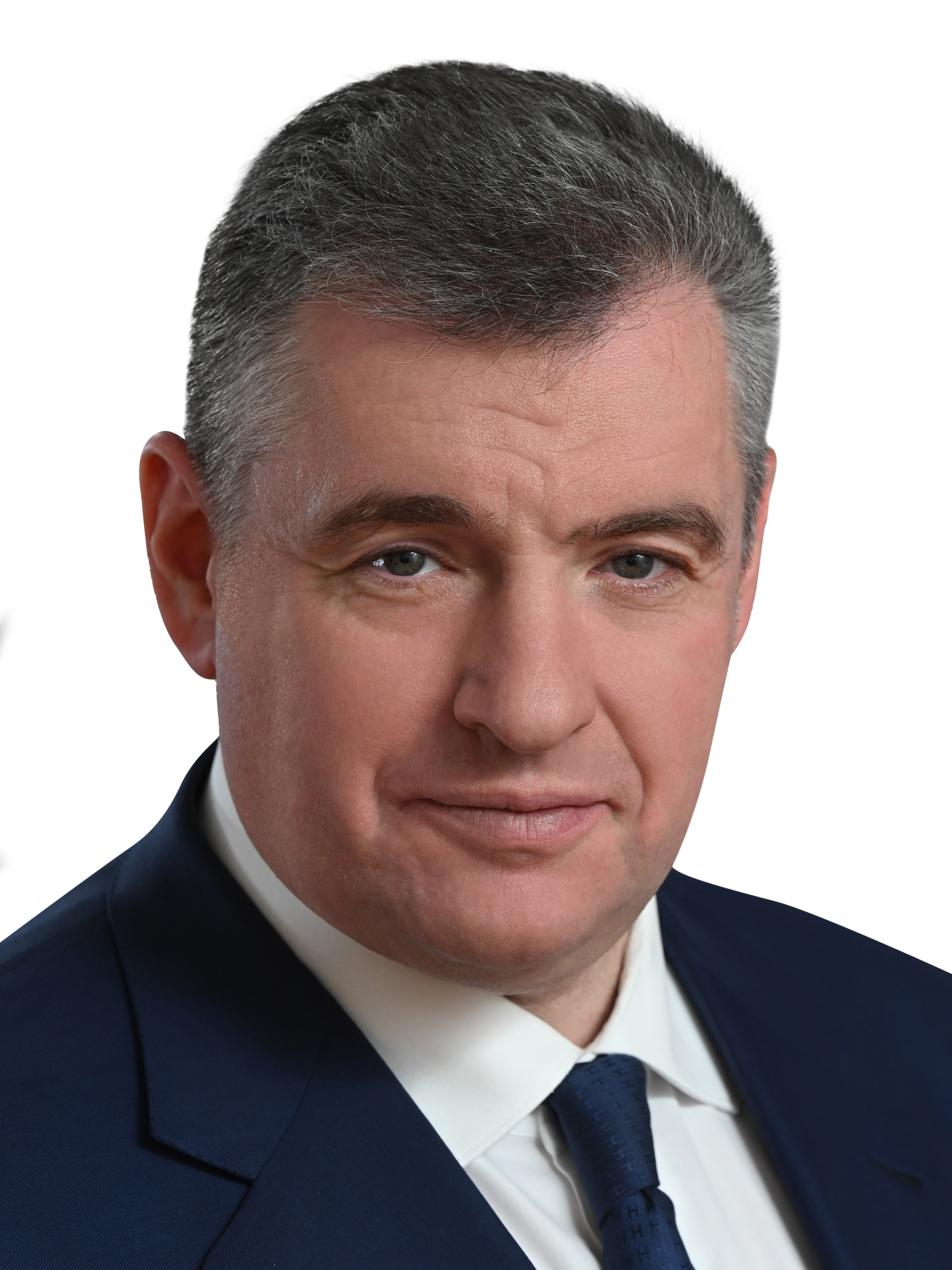

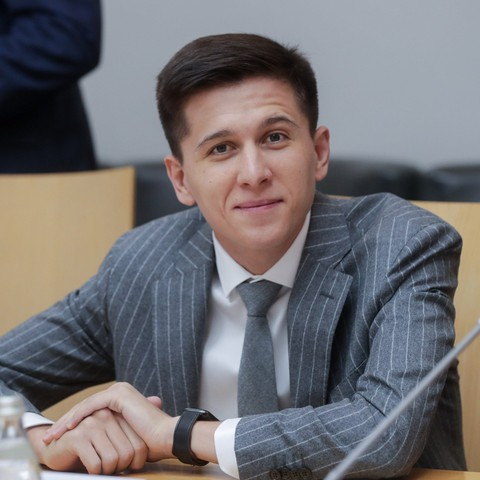
	Majority party	Minority party	Third party
Candidate	Aleksey Teksler	Valery Gartung	Leonid Slutsky
Party	United Russia	SR–ZP	LDPR
Last election	42.58%, 43 seats	14.79%, 7 seats	11.31%, 3 seats
Seats won	48	6	2
Seat change	▲5	▼1	▼1
Popular vote	558,948	137,838	100,399
Percentage	54.48%	13.43%	9.79%
Swing	▲11.90 pp	▼1.36 pp	▼1.52 pp
	Fourth party	Fifth party	Sixth party
		CPRF	RPPSS
Candidate	Maksim Gulin	Igor Yegorov	Stepan Firstov
Party	New People	CPRF	Party of Pensioners
Last election	Did not participate	11.87%, 4 seats	5.70%, 2 seats
Seats won	2	1	1
Seat change	Did not participate	▼3	▼1
Popular vote	83,164	60,985	58,404
Percentage	8.11%	5.94%	5.69%
Swing	Did not participate	▼5.93 pp	▼0.01 pp
Chairman before election
Oleg Gerber
United Russia
Elected Chairman
Oleg Gerber
United Russia

The 2025 Legislative Assembly of Chelyabinsk Oblast election took place on 12–14 September 2025, on common election day. All 60 seats in the Legislative Assembly were up for re-election.

United Russia increased its already overwhelming majority in the Legislative Assembly, winning 54.5% of the vote and 28 of 30 single-mandate constituencies. A Just Russia – For Truth, led by popular State Duma member Valery Gartung, retained its position as runner-up, losing one seat. Liberal Democratic Party of Russia and Party of Pensioners also lost one seat each, while Communist Party of the Russian Federation suffered major defeat, losing half of its vote share and retaining only a single seat. New People entered the Legislative Assembly for the first time, winning two seats.

== Electoral system ==
Under current election laws, the Legislative Assembly is elected for a term of five years, with parallel voting. 30 seats are elected by party-list proportional representation with a 5% electoral threshold, with the other half elected in 30 single-member constituencies by first-past-the-post voting. Seats in the proportional part are allocated using the Imperiali quota, modified to ensure that every party list, which passes the threshold, receives at least one mandate.

== Candidates ==
=== Party lists ===
To register regional lists of candidates, parties need to collect 0.5% of signatures of all registered voters in Chelyabinsk Oblast.

The following parties were relieved from the necessity to collect signatures:

- United Russia
- Communist Party of the Russian Federation
- Liberal Democratic Party of Russia
- A Just Russia — Patriots — For Truth
- New People
- Russian Party of Pensioners for Social Justice
- Green Alternative

№	Party	Party-list leaders	Candidates	Status
1	United Russia	Aleksey Teksler • Andrey Orekhov • Oleg Golikov • Oleg Gerber • Anatoly Yeryomin	46	Registered
2	Party of Pensioners	Stepan Firstov • Dmitry Popov • Vladimir Vladimirsky • Denis Borsuk • Aleksey Frolov	31	Registered
3	New People	Maksim Gulin • Yevgeny Gorshkov • Polina Krepak • Denis Lezin • Yevgeny Motovilov	41	Registered
4	Liberal Democratic Party	Leonid Slutsky • Vitaly Pashin • Aleksey Besedin • Kirill Usmanov • Ivan Novikov	45	Registered
5	Communist Party	Igor Yegorov • Konstantin Kurkin • Danila Andreyevskikh • Andrey Duda • Aleksandr Andreyev	43	Registered
6	A Just Russia – For Truth	Valery Gartung • Vasily Shvetsov • Ksenia Morozova • Aleksey Chechenin • Aleksey Zemzyulin	67	Registered

New People will take part in Chelyabinsk Oblast legislative election for the first time. Rodina, which participated in the last election, did not file, while For Truth and Party of Growth has been dissolved since. Green Alternative was able to enter the Legislative Assembly of Chelyabinsk Oblast in the last election, however, the party decided not to contest the 2025 election after its sole deputy switched to United Russia.

=== Single-mandate constituencies ===
30 single-mandate constituencies were formed in Chelyabinsk Oblast. To register candidates in single-mandate constituencies need to collect 3% of signatures of registered voters in the constituency.

Number of candidates in single-mandate constituencies
Party	Candidates	
Party	Nominated	Registered
United Russia	30	29
A Just Russia – For Truth	28	28
Communist Party	30	30
Liberal Democratic Party	30	30
Party of Pensioners	13	12
New People	30	29
Yabloko	4	0
Independent	3	1
Total	168	160

== Polls ==
Fieldwork date	Polling firm	UR	SR-ZP	LDPR	NL	CPRF	RPPSS
14 September 2025	2025 election	54.5	13.4	9.8	8.1	5.9	5.7
18–20 August 2025	Russian Field	47.9	11.2	12.7	12.6	9.2	5.4
13 September 2020	2020 election	42.6	14.8	11.3	–	11.9	5.7

== Results ==
=== Results by party lists ===
Summary of the 12–14 September 2025 Legislative Assembly of Chelyabinsk Oblast election results
Party	Party list					Constituency		Total	
Party	Votes	%	±pp	Seats	+/–	Seats	+/–	Seats	+/–
United Russia	558,948	54.48	▲11.90	20	▲5	28	Steady	48	▲5
A Just Russia — For Truth	137,838	13.43	▼1.36	4	▼1	2	Steady	6	▼1
Liberal Democratic Party	100,399	9.79	▼1.52	2	▼1	0	Steady	2	▼1
New People	83,164	8.11	New	2	New	0	New	2	New
Communist Party	60,985	5.94	▼5.93	1	▼3	0	Steady	1	▼3
Party of Pensioners	58,404	5.69	▼0.01	1	▼1	0	Steady	1	▼1
Independent	–	–	–	–	–	0	Steady	0	Steady
Invalid ballots	26,265	2.56	▼1.35	—	—	—	—	—	—
Total	1,026,016	100.00	—	30	Steady	30	Steady	60	Steady
Turnout	1,026,016	39.90	▲6.03	—	—	—	—	—	—
Registered voters	2,571,479	100.00	—	—	—	—	—	—	—

Oleg Gerber (United Russia) was re-elected as Chairman of the Legislative Assembly, while incumbent Senator Oleg Tsepkin (United Russia) was re-appointed to the Federation Council.

=== Results in single-member constituencies ===
==== District 1 ====
Summary of the 12–14 September 2025 Legislative Assembly of Chelyabinsk Oblast election in District 1
Candidate	Party	Votes	%
Aleksey Remezov	United Russia	15,905	43.96%
Ivan Rykov	New People	6,145	16.98%
Yevgeny Kourov	A Just Russia – For Truth	5,364	14.83%
Khalil Mingaliyev	Communist Party	4,001	11.06%
Karina Dmitriyeva	Liberal Democratic Party	2,885	7.97%
Total		36,180	100%

==== District 2 ====
Summary of the 12–14 September 2025 Legislative Assembly of Chelyabinsk Oblast election in District 2
Candidate	Party	Votes	%
Tatyana Kuznetsova (incumbent)	United Russia	16,434	51.77%
Olga Charina	New People	5,334	16.80%
Valentin Shilov	Communist Party	2,969	9.35%
Yevgeny Pokryshkin	Liberal Democratic Party	2,704	8.52%
Yevgeny Chubrikov	A Just Russia – For Truth	2,466	7.77%
Total		31,747	100%

==== District 3 ====
Summary of the 12–14 September 2025 Legislative Assembly of Chelyabinsk Oblast election in District 3
Candidate	Party	Votes	%
Artemy Galitsyn	United Russia	16,003	43.69%
Yulia Lopatina	A Just Russia – For Truth	6,968	19.02%
Sergey Aleksandrov	Communist Party	3,870	10.56%
Salavat Yumaguzhin	Liberal Democratic Party	3,797	10.37%
Daniil Cheburin	New People	2,613	7.13%
Nikolay Sayenko	Party of Pensioners	1,651	4.51%
Total		36,632	100%

==== District 4 ====
Summary of the 12–14 September 2025 Legislative Assembly of Chelyabinsk Oblast election in District 4
Candidate	Party	Votes	%
Sergey Kostylev	United Russia	14,777	45.78%
Dmitry Karpinsky	A Just Russia – For Truth	5,127	15.88%
Anna Sidorova	Communist Party	4,348	13.47%
Anton Karavayev	Liberal Democratic Party	4,272	13.24%
Maksim Korovin	New People	2,311	7.16%
Total		32,277	100%

==== District 5 ====
Summary of the 12–14 September 2025 Legislative Assembly of Chelyabinsk Oblast election in District 5
Candidate	Party	Votes	%
Aleksey Rozhkov	United Russia	18,885	60.11%
Aleksandr Bukharin	Communist Party	4,799	15.28%
Konstantin Kononov	New People	3,983	12.68%
Artyom Semyonov	Liberal Democratic Party	2,207	7.02%
Total		31,417	100%

==== District 6 ====
Summary of the 12–14 September 2025 Legislative Assembly of Chelyabinsk Oblast election in District 6
Candidate	Party	Votes	%
Lena Kolesnikova	United Russia	21,034	57.78%
Aleksey Vasilyev	A Just Russia – For Truth	5,646	15.51%
Ilya Pervukhin	New People	3,189	8.76%
Marina Rychkova	Communist Party	2,635	7.24%
Kirill Usmanov	Liberal Democratic Party	1,934	5.31%
Total		36,406	100%

==== District 7 ====
Summary of the 12–14 September 2025 Legislative Assembly of Chelyabinsk Oblast election in District 7
Candidate	Party	Votes	%
Yevgeny Terentyev	United Russia	34,723	63.66%
Viktor Plyuta	A Just Russia – For Truth	5,673	10.40%
Andrey Blagikh	Liberal Democratic Party	5,315	9.74%
Ksenia Batalova	New People	4,308	7.90%
Andrey Tingayev	Communist Party	3,933	7.21%
Total		54,542	100%

==== District 8 ====
Summary of the 12–14 September 2025 Legislative Assembly of Chelyabinsk Oblast election in District 8
Candidate	Party	Votes	%
Pavel Loginov	United Russia	13,330	41.70%
Yekaterina Bochkova	Communist Party	4,334	13.56%
Yekaterina Chernoskutova	A Just Russia – For Truth	3,785	11.84%
Yana Komarova	New People	3,124	9.77%
Aleksey Selivanov	Party of Pensioners	3,004	9.40%
Kirill Kozhevnikov	Liberal Democratic Party	2,447	7.65%
Total		31,969	100%

==== District 9 ====
Summary of the 12–14 September 2025 Legislative Assembly of Chelyabinsk Oblast election in District 9
Candidate	Party	Votes	%
Sergey Sesyunin	United Russia	12,915	47.24%
Sergey Grigoryev	A Just Russia – For Truth	3,904	14.28%
Stepan Firstov	Party of Pensioners	3,284	12.01%
Maksim Sementeyev	Liberal Democratic Party	3,143	11.50%
Andrey Laptev	Communist Party	1,999	7.31%
Total		27,338	100%

==== District 10 ====
Summary of the 12–14 September 2025 Legislative Assembly of Chelyabinsk Oblast election in District 10
Candidate	Party	Votes	%
Pavel Kiselyov	United Russia	19,779	54.41%
Aleksandr Zakhartsev	New People	4,509	12.40%
Yulia Kudashova	A Just Russia – For Truth	3,981	10.95%
Aleksey Besedin	Liberal Democratic Party	3,663	10.08%
Vladimir Kornev	Communist Party	3,004	8.26%
Total		36,355	100%

==== District 11 ====
Summary of the 12–14 September 2025 Legislative Assembly of Chelyabinsk Oblast election in District 11
Candidate	Party	Votes	%
Marina Poddubnaya	United Russia	12,761	48.35%
Andrey Menshikov	A Just Russia – For Truth	3,610	13.68%
Ivan Novikov	Liberal Democratic Party	3,042	11.53%
Igor Yegorov	Communist Party	2,981	11.30%
Maksim Perfilyev	New People	2,868	10.87%
Total		26,391	100%

==== District 12 ====
Summary of the 12–14 September 2025 Legislative Assembly of Chelyabinsk Oblast election in District 12
Candidate	Party	Votes	%
Eldar Gilmutdinov	United Russia	9,080	40.43%
Yevgeny Baklanov	A Just Russia – For Truth	4,571	20.35%
Polina Krepak	New People	4,022	17.91%
Andrey Duda	Communist Party	2,119	9.44%
Arina Koksharova	Liberal Democratic Party	1,960	8.73%
Total		22,457	100%

==== District 13 ====
Summary of the 12–14 September 2025 Legislative Assembly of Chelyabinsk Oblast election in District 13
Candidate	Party	Votes	%
Tatyana Chilimskaya	United Russia	11,583	48.68%
Andrey Kondratyev	A Just Russia – For Truth	4,295	18.05%
Anatoly Bondar	Liberal Democratic Party	3,324	13.97%
Semyon Snedkov	New People	2,254	9.47%
Anton Kostenko	Communist Party	1,772	7.45%
Total		23,795	100%

==== District 14 ====
Summary of the 12–14 September 2025 Legislative Assembly of Chelyabinsk Oblast election in District 14
Candidate	Party	Votes	%
Yevgeny Svezhentsev	United Russia	10,408	47.76%
Dmitry Popov	Party of Pensioners	3,311	15.19%
Pavel Abdulin	A Just Russia – For Truth	2,527	11.60%
Georgy Serichenko	New People	2,184	10.02%
Vladislav Zhekoldin	Liberal Democratic Party	1,477	6.78%
Danila Andreyevskikh	Communist Party	1,346	6.18%
Total		21,791	100%

==== District 15 ====
Summary of the 12–14 September 2025 Legislative Assembly of Chelyabinsk Oblast election in District 15
Candidate	Party	Votes	%
Mikhail Vidgof (incumbent)	United Russia	19,271	67.43%
Anna Steshits	A Just Russia – For Truth	3,398	11.89%
Yelizaveta Gafner	Liberal Democratic Party	2,052	7.18%
Dmitry Mynov	New People	1,649	5.77%
Aleksandr Kurochkin	Communist Party	1,626	5.69%
Total		28,579	100%

==== District 16 ====
Summary of the 12–14 September 2025 Legislative Assembly of Chelyabinsk Oblast election in District 16
Candidate	Party	Votes	%
Aleksandr Kazakov	United Russia	7,485	39.46%
Vasily Varlakov	A Just Russia – For Truth	2,901	15.29%
Sergey Migulin	New People	2,668	14.07%
Leonid Weidner	Communist Party	1,818	9.59%
Alyona Sholokhova	Party of Pensioners	1,775	9.36%
Tatyana Krugovykh	Liberal Democratic Party	1,752	9.24%
Total		18,967	100%

==== District 17 ====
Summary of the 12–14 September 2025 Legislative Assembly of Chelyabinsk Oblast election in District 17
Candidate	Party	Votes	%
Aleksandr Motovilov (incumbent)	United Russia	12,398	55.89%
Ilyas Bakhteyev	A Just Russia – For Truth	4,185	18.86%
Valentina Gololobova	New People	2,275	10.26%
Nikita Sorokin	Liberal Democratic Party	1,435	6.47%
Railya Litovkina	Communist Party	1,331	6.00%
Total		22,184	100%

==== District 18 ====
Summary of the 12–14 September 2025 Legislative Assembly of Chelyabinsk Oblast election in District 18
Candidate	Party	Votes	%
Aleksey Tsaryov	United Russia	12,058	49.13%
Sergey Abrosimov	A Just Russia – For Truth	3,825	15.58%
Vladimir Vladimirsky	Party of Pensioners	2,966	12.08%
Denis Lezin	New People	2,224	9.06%
Aleksey Suvorin	Liberal Democratic Party	1,687	6.87%
Daniil Mullagayev	Communist Party	1,205	4.91%
Total		24,545	100%

==== District 19 ====
Summary of the 12–14 September 2025 Legislative Assembly of Chelyabinsk Oblast election in District 19
Candidate	Party	Votes	%
Yegor Babkin	A Just Russia – For Truth	17,846	52.88%
Aleksandr Sinitsyn	United Russia	8,907	26.39%
Ksenia Ukhova	New People	2,178	6.45%
Anton Kudinov	Liberal Democratic Party	1,907	5.65%
Denis Borsuk	Party of Pensioners	1,479	4.38%
Tural Novruzov	Communist Party	891	2.64%
Total		33,749	100%

==== District 20 ====
Summary of the 12–14 September 2025 Legislative Assembly of Chelyabinsk Oblast election in District 20
Candidate	Party	Votes	%
Natalya Nikanorova	United Russia	10,151	31.57%
Dmitry Sumin (incumbent)	A Just Russia – For Truth	10,066	31.30%
Yelena Aksenova	New People	3,431	10.67%
Irina Merker	Liberal Democratic Party	2,905	9.03%
Aleksandr Olyunin	Party of Pensioners	2,110	6.56%
Aleksey Titov	Communist Party	1,764	5.49%
Total		32,157	100%

==== District 21 ====
Summary of the 12–14 September 2025 Legislative Assembly of Chelyabinsk Oblast election in District 21
Candidate	Party	Votes	%
Dmitry Pyrsikov (incumbent)	United Russia	26,792	57.45%
Aleksandr Nikolayev	A Just Russia – For Truth	3,483	7.47%
Yevgeny Motovilov	New People	3,478	7.46%
Stanislav Toropov	Liberal Democratic Party	3,217	6.90%
Leonid Ilyin	Communist Party	2,786	5.97%
Yana Kurochkina	Party of Pensioners	2,739	5.87%
Yelena Yurtayeva	Independent	2,728	5.85%
Total		46,639	100%

==== District 22 ====
Summary of the 12–14 September 2025 Legislative Assembly of Chelyabinsk Oblast election in District 22
Candidate	Party	Votes	%
Denis Moiseyev	United Russia	19,780	54.62%
Ksenia Morozova	A Just Russia – For Truth	6,173	17.04%
Boris Karpenkov	Communist Party	3,461	9.56%
Roman Savitsky	New People	2,267	6.26%
Aleksey Protasov	Party of Pensioners	1,707	4.71%
Ivan Plamennov	Liberal Democratic Party	1,497	4.13%
Total		36,216	100%

==== District 23 ====
Summary of the 12–14 September 2025 Legislative Assembly of Chelyabinsk Oblast election in District 23
Candidate	Party	Votes	%
Vladimir Perezolov (incumbent)	United Russia	22,899	57.23%
Marina Belozertseva	A Just Russia – For Truth	5,767	14.41%
Irina Zhvakina	Communist Party	3,670	9.17%
Nadezhda Lomakina	Liberal Democratic Party	2,993	7.48%
Sergey Solomennikov	New People	2,891	7.22%
Total		40,015	100%

==== District 24 ====
Summary of the 12–14 September 2025 Legislative Assembly of Chelyabinsk Oblast election in District 24
Candidate	Party	Votes	%
Arkady Agapov	A Just Russia – For Truth	13,464	27.72%
Vitaly Pashin	Liberal Democratic Party	13,297	27.38%
Yevgeny Yeremeyev	New People	7,367	15.17%
Kirill Sitnikov	Party of Pensioners	7,053	14.52%
Zakhar Chizhov	Communist Party	4,635	9.54%
Total		48,569	100%

==== District 25 ====
Summary of the 12–14 September 2025 Legislative Assembly of Chelyabinsk Oblast election in District 25
Candidate	Party	Votes	%
Yevgeny Ille	United Russia	29,002	62.03%
Denis Goncharenko	New People	5,667	12.12%
Sergey Nizamutdinov	A Just Russia – For Truth	3,413	7.30%
Ksenia Fedotova	Party of Pensioners	2,713	5.80%
Dmitry Mayakov	Liberal Democratic Party	2,437	5.21%
Anton Muravyev	Communist Party	1,927	4.12%
Total		46,754	100%

==== District 26 ====
Summary of the 12–14 September 2025 Legislative Assembly of Chelyabinsk Oblast election in District 26
Candidate	Party	Votes	%
Oleg Parfilov	United Russia	15,647	43.91%
Stepan Bondarev	Liberal Democratic Party	5,755	16.15%
Artur Kagarmanov	New People	4,998	14.02%
Denis Demidyuk	A Just Russia – For Truth	4,378	12.28%
Rustam Valiyev	Communist Party	3,191	8.95%
Total		35,638	100%

==== District 27 ====
Summary of the 12–14 September 2025 Legislative Assembly of Chelyabinsk Oblast election in District 27
Candidate	Party	Votes	%
Vyacheslav Yevstigneyev (incumbent)	United Russia	17,810	53.05%
Vladislav Khustenko	New People	5,105	15.21%
Mikhail Kulchitsky	Liberal Democratic Party	4,513	13.44%
Aleksandr Lozynin	Communist Party	4,341	12.93%
Total		33,569	100%

==== District 28 ====
Summary of the 12–14 September 2025 Legislative Assembly of Chelyabinsk Oblast election in District 28
Candidate	Party	Votes	%
Pavel Shilyayev (incumbent)	United Russia	18,106	54.71%
Yulia Grigoryeva	New People	4,662	14.09%
Roman Bakursky	Liberal Democratic Party	3,578	10.81%
Ivan Kreslov	A Just Russia – For Truth	2,978	9.00%
Oleg Kryazhev	Communist Party	2,172	6.56%
Total		33,093	100%

==== District 29 ====
Summary of the 12–14 September 2025 Legislative Assembly of Chelyabinsk Oblast election in District 29
Candidate	Party	Votes	%
Aleksey Kovalenko	United Russia	16,223	43.21%
Sergey Doronin	New People	6,728	17.92%
Yekaterina Sisina	Communist Party	5,218	13.90%
Valery Ishmametyev	A Just Russia – For Truth	4,293	11.43%
Aleksey Langof	Liberal Democratic Party	3,306	8.81%
Total		37,544	100%

==== District 30 ====
Summary of the 12–14 September 2025 Legislative Assembly of Chelyabinsk Oblast election in District 30
Candidate	Party	Votes	%
Dmitry Kleutin	United Russia	27,082	55.49%
Damir Baytenov	Liberal Democratic Party	7,159	14.67%
Radmir Ismagilov	A Just Russia – For Truth	4,910	10.06%
Nikita Fattakhov	Communist Party	4,813	9.86%
Marat Salimov	New People	3,005	6.16%
Total		48,808	100%

=== Members ===
Incumbent deputies are highlighted with bold, elected members who declined to take a seat are marked with ~~strikethrough~~.

Constituency
No.	Member	Party
1	Aleksey Remezov	United Russia
2	Tatyana Kuznetsova	United Russia
3	Artemy Galitsyn	United Russia
4	Sergey Kostylev	United Russia
5	Aleksey Rozhkov	United Russia
6	Lena Kolesnikova	United Russia
7	Yevgeny Terentyev	United Russia
8	Pavel Loginov	United Russia
9	Sergey Sesyunin	United Russia
10	Pavel Kiselyov	United Russia
11	Marina Poddubnaya	United Russia
12	Eldar Gilmutdinov	United Russia
13	Tatyana Chilimskaya	United Russia
14	Yevgeny Svezhentsev	United Russia
15	Mikhail Vigof	United Russia
16	Aleksandr Kazakov	United Russia
17	Aleksandr Motovilov	United Russia
18	Aleksey Tsarev	United Russia
19	Yegor Babkin	A Just Russia – For Truth
20	Natalya Nikanorova	United Russia
21	Dmitry Pyrsikov	United Russia
22	Denis Moiseyev	United Russia
23	Vladimir Perezolov	United Russia
24	Arkady Agapov	A Just Russia – For Truth
25	Yevgeny Ille	United Russia
26	Oleg Parfilov	United Russia
27	Vyacheslav Yevstigneyev	United Russia
28	Pavel Shilyayev	United Russia
29	Aleksey Kovalenko	United Russia
30	Dmitry Kleutin	United Russia

Party lists
Member	Party
~~Aleksey Teksler~~	United Russia
Andrey Orekhov	United Russia
~~Oleg Golikov~~	United Russia
Oleg Gerber	United Russia
Anatoly Yeryomin	United Russia
Aleksandr Zaozyorov	United Russia
~~Aleksey Loshkin~~	United Russia
~~Vladimir Pavlov~~	United Russia
Yevgeny Gubanov	United Russia
Oleg Tsepkin	United Russia
Andrey Schmidt	United Russia
Anatoly Bragin	United Russia
Valery Kolokoltsev	United Russia
~~Sergey Buyakov~~	United Russia
~~Denis Lapotyshkin~~	United Russia
~~Dmitry Melnikov~~	United Russia
Vitaly Maslov	United Russia
Ramil Rakhmankulov	United Russia
Valery Filippov	United Russia
Yevgeny Subachev	United Russia
Ilya Tabolin	United Russia
Oleg Sadovskikh	United Russia
Natalya Loshchinina	United Russia
Yevgeny Reva	United Russia
Svetlana Buravova	United Russia
Vladislav Ulanov	United Russia
Vigen Mkhitaryan	United Russia
~~Valery Gartung~~	A Just Russia – For Truth
Vasily Shvetsov	A Just Russia – For Truth
Ksenia Morozova	A Just Russia – For Truth
Aleksey Chechenin	A Just Russia – For Truth
~~Aleksey Zemzyulin~~	A Just Russia – For Truth
Vladimir Bekishev	A Just Russia – For Truth
~~Leonid Slutsky~~	Liberal Democratic Party
Vitaly Pashin	Liberal Democratic Party
Aleksey Besedin	Liberal Democratic Party
Maksim Gulin	New People
Yevgeny Gorshkov	New People
~~Igor Yegorov~~	Communist Party
Konstantin Kurkin	Communist Party
Stepan Firstov	Party of Pensioners

== See also ==
- 2025 Russian regional elections
