= Athletics at the 2007 Summer Universiade – Women's heptathlon =

The women's heptathlon event at the 2007 Summer Universiade was held on 9–10 August.

== Medalists ==
Gold	Silver	Bronze
Viktorija Žemaitytė; Lithuania	Sara Aerts; Belgium	Hanna Melnychenko; Ukraine

== Results ==
=== 100 metres hurdles ===
Wind:
Heat 1: -0.7 m/s, Heat 2: +0.3 m/s

Rank	Heat	Name	Nationality	Time	Points	Notes
1	1	Sara Aerts	Belgium	13.44	1059	
2	2	Hanna Melnychenko	Ukraine	13.78	1010	
3	2	Natalya Kotova	Russia	13.88	995	
4	2	Claudine Müller	Switzerland	14.07	968	
5	2	Maryna Parkhomenka	Belarus	14.18	953	
6	1	Elisa Trevisan	Italy	14.33	932	
7	1	Blandine Maisonnier	France	14.41	921	
8	2	Viktorija Žemaitytė	Lithuania	14.49	910	
9	1	Liina Lukin	Estonia	14.93	851	
10	1	Zita Ovari	Hungary	14.94	850	
11	1	Anna Nikitenko	Russia	15.40	790	
12	1	Myriam Quiñónez	Ecuador	15.84	734	
13	2	Walailack Prikboonjan	Thailand	15.88	729	
14	2	Laura Ludevika	Latvia	16.01	713	

=== High jump ===
Rank	Group	Athlete	Nationality	Result	Points	Notes	Overall
1	A	Viktorija Žemaitytė	Lithuania	1.84	1029		1939
1	B	Anna Nikitenko	Russia	1.84	1029		1819
3	B	Natalya Kotova	Russia	1.78	953		1948
3	B	Hanna Melnychenko	Ukraine	1.78	953		1963
5	A	Claudine Müller	Switzerland	1.72	879		1847
5	A	Sara Aerts	Belgium	1.72	879		1938
5	B	Laura Ludevika	Latvia	1.72	879		1592
8	A	Blandine Maisonnier	France	1.69	842		1763
8	B	Zita Ovari	Hungary	1.69	842		1692
10	A	Elisa Trevisan	Italy	1.66	806		1738
11	A	Liina Lukin	Estonia	1.57	701		1552
11	B	Maryna Parkhomenka	Belarus	1.57	701		1654
13	A	Myriam Quiñónez	Ecuador	1.54	666		1400
14	B	Walailack Prikboonjan	Thailand	1.48	599		1328

=== Shot put ===
Rank	Athlete	Nationality	#1	#2	#3	Result	Points	Notes	Overall
1	Elisa Trevisan	Italy	13.90	13.83	x	13.90	787		2525
2	Viktorija Žemaitytė	Lithuania	13.61	13.44	11.68	13.61	768		2707
3	Natalya Kotova	Russia	13.37	12.64	12.89	13.37	752		2700
4	Zita Ovari	Hungary	12.95	13.32	13.09	13.32	749		2441
5	Maryna Parkhomenka	Belarus	11.72	12.04	13.13	13.13	736		2390
6	Sara Aerts	Belgium	12.61	10.96	12.11	12.61	702		2640
7	Hanna Melnychenko	Ukraine	12.27	12.59	12.45	12.59	700		2663
8	Anna Nikitenko	Russia	11.67	12.12	x	12.12	669		2488
9	Claudine Müller	Switzerland	10.79	x	11.71	11.71	642		2489
10	Blandine Maisonnier	France	11.15	11.41	10.80	11.41	622		2385
11	Laura Ludevika	Latvia	x	10.54	11.35	11.35	618		2210
12	Liina Lukin	Estonia	9.20	10.67	9.85	10.67	573		2125
13	Myriam Quiñónez	Ecuador	10.10	10.25	x	10.25	546		1946
14	Walailack Prikboonjan	Thailand	8.04	8.26	8.30	8.30	419		1747

=== 200 metres ===
Wind:
Heat 1: +0.3 m/s, Heat 2: +0.5 m/s

Rank	Heat	Name	Nationality	Time	Points	Notes	Overall
1	1	Sara Aerts	Belgium	24.42	941		3581
2	2	Hanna Melnychenko	Ukraine	24.51	932		3595
3	2	Maryna Parkhomenka	Belarus	24.78	907		3297
4	2	Natalya Kotova	Russia	24.93	893		3593
5	2	Viktorija Žemaitytė	Lithuania	25.15	873		3580
6	1	Elisa Trevisan	Italy	25.46	845		3370
7	1	Blandine Maisonnier	France	25.46	845		3230
8	2	Claudine Müller	Switzerland	25.54	838		3327
9	1	Anna Nikitenko	Russia	25.75	819		3307
10	1	Myriam Quiñónez	Ecuador	26.07	791		2737
11	1	Zita Ovari	Hungary	26.15	784		3225
12	2	Laura Ludevika	Latvia	26.93	718		2928
13	2	Walailack Prikboonjan	Thailand	26.93	714		2461
14	1	Liina Lukin	Estonia	27.59	664		2789

=== Long jump ===
Rank	Athlete	Nationality	#1	#2	#3	Result	Points	Notes	Overall
1	Hanna Melnychenko	Ukraine	x	6.31	x	6.31	946		4541
2	Blandine Maisonnier	France	5.96w	6.06w	6.26w	6.26w	930		4160
3	Anna Nikitenko	Russia	6.07w	5.84	6.24	6.24	924		4231
4	Maryna Parkhomenka	Belarus	5.87	6.16	6.00	6.16	899		4196
5	Elisa Trevisan	Italy	6.09w	x	5.85	6.09w	877		4247
6	Natalya Kotova	Russia	6.04w	x	5.84	6.04w	862		4455
7	Viktorija Žemaitytė	Lithuania	x	6.04	x	6.04	862		4442
8	Sara Aerts	Belgium	5.83	5.87w	5.74	5.87w	810		4391
9	Zita Ovari	Hungary	5.65	x	5.71	5.71	762		3987
10	Claudine Müller	Switzerland	x	x	5.68	5.68	753		4080
11	Liina Lukin	Estonia	x	x	5.38w	5.38w	665		3454
12	Laura Ludevika	Latvia	5.14	5.34w	5.29	5.34w	654		3582
13	Walailack Prikboonjan	Thailand	x	x	5.11w	5.11w	589		3050
14	Myriam Quiñónez	Ecuador	x	3.21	5.10	5.10	587		3324

=== Javelin throw ===
Rank	Athlete	Nationality	#1	#2	#3	Result	Points	Notes	Overall
1	Viktorija Žemaitytė	Lithuania	44.98	45.26	x	45.26	768		5210
2	Zita Ovari	Hungary	40.10	41.23	39.83	41.23	691		4678
3	Elisa Trevisan	Italy	41.04	39.77	35.30	41.04	687		4934
4	Sara Aerts	Belgium	39.87	39.51	38.23	39.87	665		5056
5	Laura Ludevika	Latvia	31.99	32.82	37.47	37.47	619		4201
6	Claudine Müller	Switzerland	34.18	36.08	36.89	36.89	608		4688
7	Natalya Kotova	Russia	34.58	35.84	36.17	36.17	594		5049
8	Blandine Maisonnier	France	30.70	32.62	35.17	35.17	575		4735
9	Hanna Melnychenko	Ukraine	34.41	x	32.86	34.41	560		5101
10	Anna Nikitenko	Russia	33.08	31.35	33.50	33.50	543		4774
11	Liina Lukin	Estonia	33.30	32.35	31.29	33.30	539		3993
12	Maryna Parkhomenka	Belarus	32.86	32.61	31.55	32.86	531		4727
13	Myriam Quiñónez	Ecuador	29.80	x	x	29.80	473		3797
14	Walailack Prikboonjan	Thailand	23.50	23.28	25.58	25.58	393		3443

=== 800 metres ===
Rank	Heat	Name	Nationality	Time	Points	Notes
1	2	Anna Nikitenko	Russia	2:14.72	897	
2	2	Blandine Maisonnier	France	2:15.59	884	
3	2	Maryna Parkhomenka	Belarus	2:16.17	876	
4	2	Sara Aerts	Belgium	2:18.24	848	
5	2	Natalya Kotova	Russia	2:24.00	770	
6	1	Zita Ovari	Hungary	2:24.04	769	
7	2	Viktorija Žemaitytė	Lithuania	2:24.70	761	
8	2	Hanna Melnychenko	Ukraine	2:25.47	751	
9	2	Elisa Trevisan	Italy	2:27.63	723	
10	1	Claudine Müller	Switzerland	2:34.30	640	
11	1	Liina Lukin	Estonia	2:39.20	582	
12	1	Laura Ludevika	Latvia	2:42.04	550	
13	1	Walailack Prikboonjan	Thailand	2:42.25	547	
	1	Myriam Quiñónez	Ecuador	DNS	0	

=== Final standings ===
The highest mark recorded in each event is highlighted in yellow

Rank	Athlete	Nationality	100m H	HJ	SP	200m	LJ	JT	800m	Points	Notes
1st place, gold medalist(s)	Viktorija Žemaitytė	Lithuania	14.49	1.84	13.61	25.15	6.04	45.26	2:24.70	5971	
2nd place, silver medalist(s)	Sara Aerts	Belgium	13.44	1.72	12.61	24.42	5.87	39.87	2:18.24	5904	
3rd place, bronze medalist(s)	Hanna Melnychenko	Ukraine	13.78	1.78	12.59	24.51	6.31	34.41	2:25.47	5852	
4	Natalya Kotova	Russia	13.88	1.78	13.37	24.93	6.04	36.17	2:24.00	5819	
5	Anna Nikitenko	Russia	15.40	1.84	12.12	25.75	6.24	33.50	2:14.72	5671	
6	Elisa Trevisan	Italy	14.33	1.66	13.90	25.46	6.09	41.04	2:27.63	5657	
7	Blandine Maisonnier	France	14.41	1.69	11.41	25.46	6.26	35.17	2:15.59	5619	
8	Maryna Parkhomenka	Belarus	14.18	1.57	13.13	24.78	6.16	32.86	2:16.17	5603	
9	Zita Ovari	Hungary	14.94	1.69	13.32	26.15	5.71	41.23	2:24.04	5447	
10	Claudine Müller	Switzerland	14.07	1.72	11.71	26.15	5.68	36.89	2:34.30	5328	
11	Laura Ludevika	Latvia	16.01	1.72	11.35	26.93	5.34	37.47	2:42.04	4751	
12	Liina Lukin	Estonia	14.93	1.57	10.67	27.59	5.38	33.30	2:39.20	4575	
13	Walailack Prikboonjan	Thailand	15.88	1.48	8.30	26.97	5.11	25.58	2:42.25	3990	
	Myriam Quiñónez	Ecuador	15.84	1.54	10.25	26.07	5.10	29.80	DNS	DNF	
