= Chelyabinsk constituency =

Russian legislative constituency

Chelyabinsk single-member constituency
- Constituency of the Russian State Duma
- Deputy: Yevgeny Ille; United Russia
- Federal subject: Chelyabinsk Oblast
- Districts: Chebarkulsky, Chelyabinsk (Kalininsky, Traktorozavodsky, Tsentralny), Plastovsky, Sosnovsky, Uysky
- Voters: 507,387 (2026)

The Chelyabinsk constituency (No.188 (Note: Kalininsky constituency No.183 in 1993–2007, No.189 in 2016–2026)) is a Russian legislative constituency in Chelyabinsk Oblast. The constituency stretches from central Chelyabinsk southwards to central Chelyabinsk Oblast.

The constituency has been represented since 2026 by United Russia deputy Yevgeny Ille, former Deputy Chairman of the Legislative Assembly of Chelyabinsk Oblast and businessman, who won the open seat, succeeding one-term United Russia incumbent Vladimir Pavlov.

== Boundaries ==
1993–2007 Kalininsky constituency: Chelyabinsk (Kalininsky, Kurchatovsky, Metallurgichesky, Traktorozavodsky, Tsentralny)
The constituency was based entirely within Chelyabinsk, covering northern and central parts of the city.

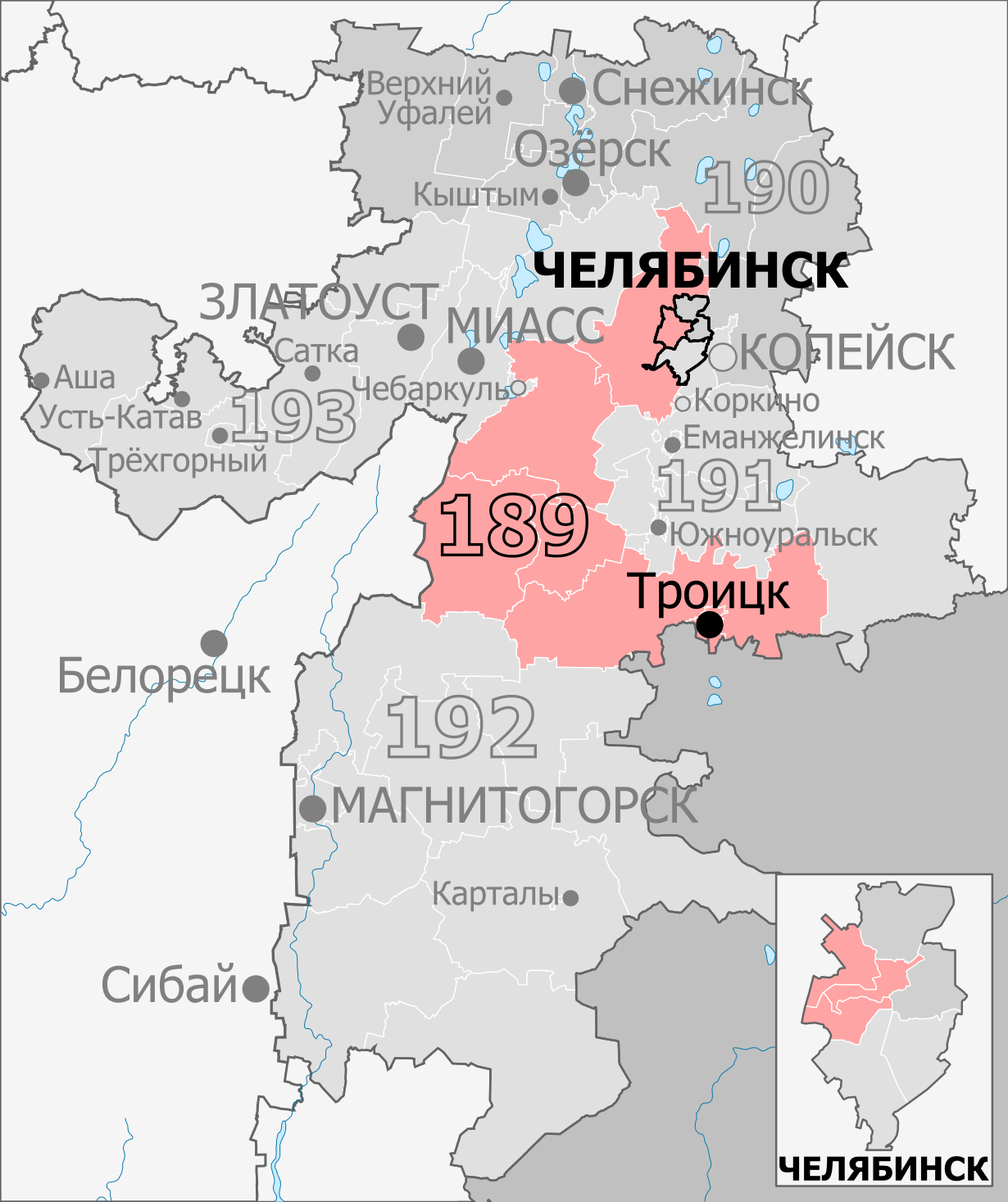
Constituency boundaries from 2016 to 2026

2016–2026: Chebarkulsky District, Chelyabinsk (Kalininsky, Kurchatovsky, Tsentralny), Plastovsky District, Sosnovsky District, Troitsk, Troitsky District, Uysky District
The constituency was re-created for the 2016 election under the name "Chelyabinsk constituency" and retained only western part of Chelyabinsk, losing the rest of its portion of the city to Metallurgichesky constituency. This seat instead gained Sosnovsky District from the former Sovetsky constituency and territories in central Chelyabinsk Oblast, including Troitsk, from the former Zlatoust constituency.

2026–present': Chebarkulsky District, Chelyabinsk (Kalininsky, Traktorozavodsky, Tsentralny), Plastovsky District, Sosnovsky District, Uysky District
After the 2025 redistricting the constituency was significantly altered, losing Troitsk and Troitsky District to Magnitogorsk constituency as well as trading Kurchatovsky City District of Chelyabinsk for Traktorozavodsky City District with Metallurgichesky constituency.

== Members elected ==
Election	Member	Party
1993	Vladimir Golovlyov	Choice of Russia
1995	Vladimir Golovlyov	Democratic Choice of Russia – United Democrats
1999	Mikhail Yurevich (Note: elected Mayor of Chelyabinsk in March 2005)	Independent
2003	Mikhail Yurevich	People's Party
2005	Dmitry Yeryomin	United Russia
2007	Proportional representation - no election by constituency	
2011	Proportional representation - no election by constituency	
2016	Andrey Baryshev	United Russia
2021	Vladimir Pavlov	United Russia
2026	Yevgeny Ille	United Russia

== Election results ==
=== 1993 ===
Summary of the 12 December 1993 Russian legislative election in the Kalininsky constituency
Candidate	Party	Votes	%
Vladimir Golovlyov	Choice of Russia	54,582	22.03%
Lyubov Lymar	Kedr	41,467	16.74%
Eduard Tenyakov	Independent	24,260	9.79%
Vyacheslav Kislitsin	Russian Democratic Reform Movement	17,564	7.09%
Igor Bayev	Yavlinsky–Boldyrev–Lukin	15,544	6.27%
Vladimir Ratnikov	Independent	15,246	6.15%
Yury Lengin	Independent	9,260	3.74%
Aleksey Yalovenko	Liberal Democratic Party	9,237	3.73%
Valentina Lekhtman	Independent	8,953	3.61%
Fyodor Degtyarev	Independent	6,117	2.47%
Andrey Stikhin	Party of Russian Unity and Accord	2,710	1.09%
Total		247,776	100%

=== 1995 ===
Summary of the 17 December 1995 Russian legislative election in the Kalininsky constituency
Candidate	Party	Votes	%
Vladimir Golovlyov (incumbent)	Democratic Choice of Russia – United Democrats	71,119	21.81%
Raisa Podvigina	Democratic Russia and Free Trade Unions	30,623	9.39%
German Vyatkin	Our Home – Russia	30,028	9.21%
Vladimir Vorushilin	Yabloko	22,434	6.88%
Nikolay Chepasov	Communist Party	20,412	6.26%
Mikhail Boldyrev	Independent	14,190	4.35%
Aleksandr Petrov	Communists and Working Russia - for the Soviet Union	13,257	4.07%
Mikhail Isayev	Ivan Rybkin Bloc	12,182	3.74%
Yury Lengin	Independent	10,802	3.31%
Vladimir Malakhov	Independent	10,741	3.29%
Valery Sudarikov	Congress of Russian Communities	8,966	2.75%
Mikhail Kotelnikov	Liberal Democratic Party	8,837	2.71%
Anatoly Zhezhera	Independent	8,724	2.68%
Vladimir Gornov	Bloc of Djuna	6,170	1.89%
Vladimir Dragunov	Bloc of Independents	4,565	1.40%
Vladislav Sirota	Independent	4,544	1.39%
Oleg Gulyak	Independent	4,240	1.30%
Nikolay Kuznetsov	Independent	3,535	1.08%
Viktor Radionov	Russian Party	1,974	0.61%
Gennady Suzdalev	Zemsky Sobor	1,176	0.36%
against all		27,379	8.40%
Total		326,117	100%

=== 1999 ===
Summary of the 19 December 1999 Russian legislative election in the Kalininsky constituency
Candidate	Party	Votes	%
Mikhail Yurevich	Independent	152,693	45.25%
Viktor Chernobrovin	Independent	87,272	25.86%
Yekaterina Gorina	Independent	11,276	3.34%
Yury Lengin	Independent	8,367	2.48%
Svetlana Mironova	Union of Right Forces	7,837	2.32%
Viktor Deryugin	Andrey Nikolayev and Svyatoslav Fyodorov Bloc	7,745	2.29%
Gennady Likhachev	Independent	6,255	1.85%
Lyubov Patrakova	Congress of Russian Communities-Yury Boldyrev Movement	6,129	1.82%
Vladimir Vasenin	Independent	2,986	0.88%
Boris Mitrofanov	Independent	2,215	0.66%
against all		39,224	11.62%
Total		337,477	100%

=== 2003 ===
Summary of the 7 December 2003 Russian legislative election in the Kalininsky constituency
Candidate	Party	Votes	%
Mikhail Yurevich (incumbent)	People's Party	98,843	33.13%
Aleksandr Berestov	Rodina	46,950	15.74%
Sergey Davydov	Independent	46,665	15.64%
Anatoly Ivanov	Communist Party	12,773	4.28%
Daniil Yurevich	Independent	10,451	3.50%
Nina Bobirenko	Russian Pensioners' Party-Party of Social Justice	9,337	3.13%
Vladimir Filichkin	Independent	8,582	2.88%
Ilya Subbotin	Yabloko	6,074	2.04%
Lyubov Patrakova	Independent	5,126	1.72%
Vladimir Gruzdev	Liberal Democratic Party	2,988	1.00%
Sergey Kostromin	For a Holy Russia	1,195	0.40%
Vladimir Berko	United Russian Party Rus'	541	0.18%
against all		43,356	14.53%
Total		298,895	100%

=== 2005 ===
Summary of the 25 December 2005 by-election in the Kalininsky constituency
Candidate	Party	Votes	%
Dmitry Yeryomin	United Russia	60,776	39.23%
Konstantin Zhabotinsky	Union of Right Forces	20,583	13.28%
Aleksandr Deyneko	Independent	18,043	11.64%
against all		46,067	29.73%
Total		154,903	100%

=== 2016 ===
Summary of the 18 September 2016 Russian legislative election in the Chelyabinsk constituency
Candidate	Party	Votes	%
Andrey Baryshev	United Russia	96,109	39.37%
Guzelia Voloshina	A Just Russia	49,017	20.08%
Yekaterina Fedotova	Liberal Democratic Party	29,660	12.15%
Eldar Gilmutdinov	Communist Party	27,983	11.46%
Andrey Talevlin	Yabloko	10,048	4.12%
Aleksey Neuymin	The Greens	6,175	2.53%
Gamil Asatullin	People's Freedom Party	4,854	1.99%
Mikhail Razzhivin	Patriots of Russia	4,287	1.76%
Ramil Mukhametshin	Civic Platform	2,498	1.02%
Aleksey Kungurtsev	Civilian Power	2,452	1.00%
Total		244,097	100%

=== 2021 ===
Summary of the 17-19 September 2021 Russian legislative election in the Chelyabinsk constituency
Candidate	Party	Votes	%
Vladimir Pavlov	United Russia	83,214	31.60%
Vasily Shvetsov	A Just Russia — For Truth	44,186	16.78%
Aleksandr Andreyev	Communist Party	34,694	13.17%
Vladimir Vladimirsky	Party of Pensioners	23,701	9.00%
Maksim Gulin	New People	19,360	7.35%
Yelena Vakhtina	Communists of Russia	18,166	6.90%
Yevgeny Reva	Liberal Democratic Party	12,206	4.64%
Sergey Smyshlyayev	Rodina	5,937	2.25%
Andrey Yatsun	Russian Party of Freedom and Justice	5,681	2.16%
Yaroslav Shcherbakov	Yabloko	5,087	1.93%
Total		263,343	100%

=== 2026 ===
Summary of the 18-20 September 2026 Russian legislative election in the Chelyabinsk constituency
Candidate	Party	Votes	%
Yevgeny Ille	United Russia	117,188	44.15%
Maksim Gulin	New People	39,850	15.01%
Vasily Shvetsov	A Just Russia	31,329	11.80%
Denis Kurochkin	Communist Party	25,095	9.46%
Vitaly Pashin	Liberal Democratic Party	22,665	8.54%
Oleg Nikulin	Party of Pensioners	15,479	5.83%
Artyom Kungurtsev	The Greens	6,021	2.27%
Total		265,407	100%
