= Bolshov =

Bolshov (masculine, Russian: Большов) or Bolshova (feminine, Russian: Большова) is a Russian surname. Notable people with the surname include:

- Ekaterina Bolshova (born 1988), Russian heptathlete
- Valentyna Bolshova (1937–2023), Ukrainian sprinter
- Viktor Bolshov (born 1939), Russian high jumper
