= 2012 IAAF World Indoor Championships – Women's pentathlon =

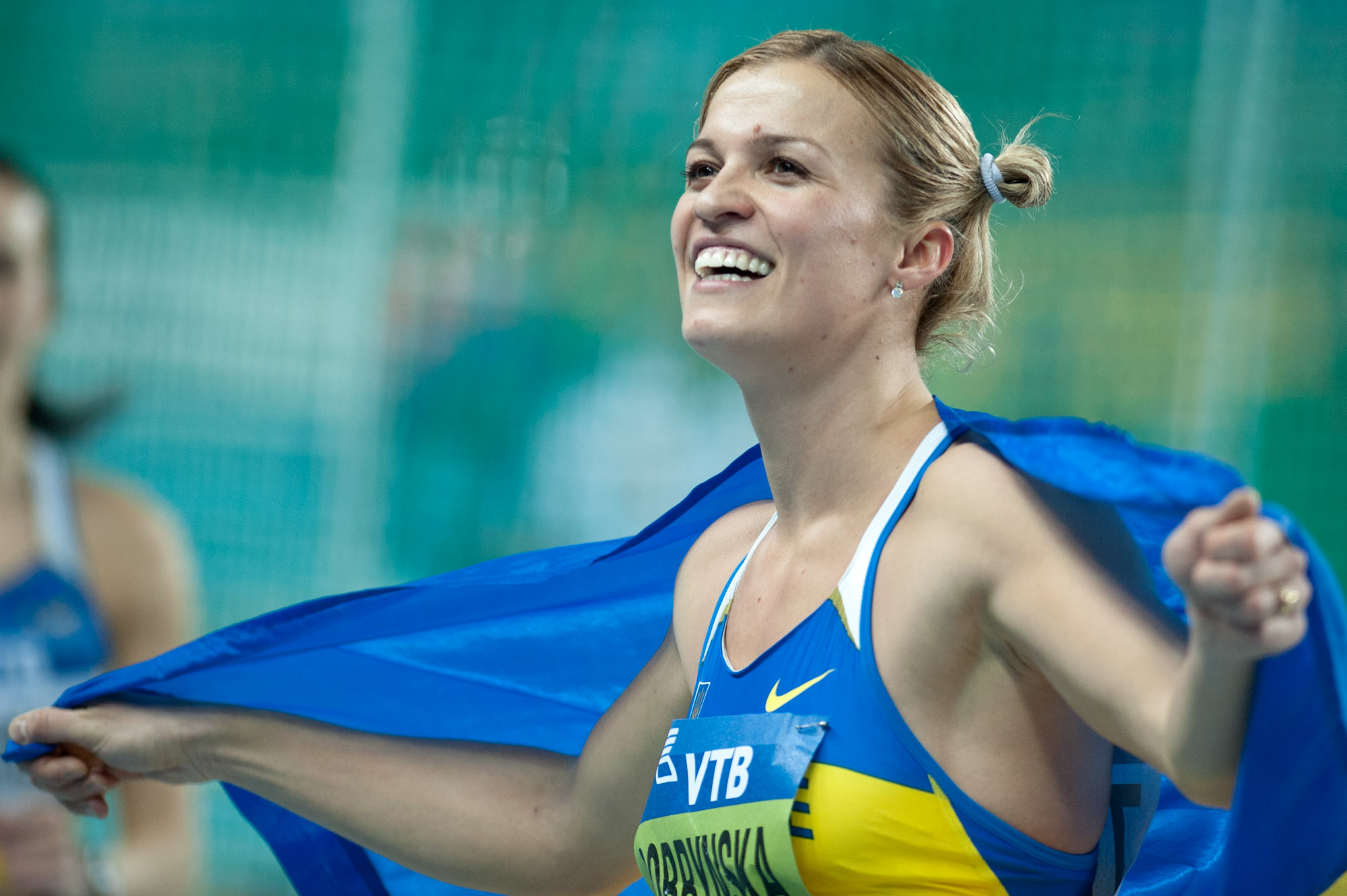
Gold medal winner Nataliya Dobrynska celebrating her win.

The women's pentathlon at the 2012 IAAF World Indoor Championships took place March 9 at the Ataköy Athletics Arena. 8 athletes from 6 countries participated. Ukrainian Nataliya Dobrynska won with a world record points total of 5013, breaking the previous record of 4991 held by Irina Belova.

== Medalists ==
Gold	Silver	Bronze
Nataliya Dobrynska; Ukraine	Jessica Ennis; United Kingdom	Austra Skujytė; Lithuania

== Records ==
Standing records prior to the 2012 IAAF World Indoor Championships
World record	Irina Belova (CIS)	4991	Berlin, Germany	15 February 1992
Championship record	Jessica Ennis (GBR)	4937	Doha, Qatar	13 March 2010
World Leading	Ekaterina Bolshova (RUS)	4896	Moscow, Russia	7 February 2012
African record	Eunice Barber (SLE)	4558	Paris, France	17 March 1993
Asian record	Olga Rypakova (KAZ)	4582	Pattaya, Thailand	10 February 2006
European record	Irina Belova (CIS)	4991	Berlin, Germany	15 February 1992
North and Central American and Caribbean record	LeShundra Nathan (USA)	4753	Maebashi, Japan	5 March 1999
North and Central American and Caribbean record	Hyleas Fountain (USA)	4753	Doha, Qatar	13 March 2010
Oceanian Record	Jane Jamieson (AUS)	4490	Maebashi, Japan	5 March 1999
South American record	Themys Zambrzycki (BRA)	4001	Columbia, United States	8 March 1980
Records broken during the 2012 IAAF World Indoor Championships
Championship record	Jessica Ennis (GBR)	4965	Istanbul, Turkey	9 March 2012
World Leading	Jessica Ennis (GBR)	4965	Istanbul, Turkey	9 March 2012
World record	Nataliya Dobrynska (UKR)	5013	Istanbul, Turkey	9 March 2012
Championship record	Nataliya Dobrynska (UKR)	5013	Istanbul, Turkey	9 March 2012
World Leading	Nataliya Dobrynska (UKR)	5013	Istanbul, Turkey	9 March 2012
European record	Nataliya Dobrynska (UKR)	5013	Istanbul, Turkey	9 March 2012

== Qualification standards ==
Eight (8) athletes will be invited by the IAAF in the Heptathlon and in the Pentathlon as follows:

1. the three best athletes from the previous year's Outdoor Lists (as at 31 December), limited to a maximum of one per country and
2. the three best athletes from the Indoor Lists during the year of the Competition
3. two athletes which may be invited at the discretion of the IAAF

In total no more than two male and two female athletes from any one Member will be invited. Upon refusals or cancellations, the invitations shall be extended to the next ranked athletes in the same lists respecting the above conditions. Members whose athletes are invited as above will receive additional quota places accordingly

== Schedule ==
Date	Time	Round
March 9, 2012	11:25	60 metres hurdles
March 9, 2012	12:05	High jump
March 9, 2012	13:45	Shot put
March 9, 2012	17:05	Long jump
March 9, 2012	19:35	800 metres
March 9, 2012	19:35	Final standings

== Results ==
=== 60 metres hurdles ===
Rank	Lane	Name	Nationality	Result	Points	Notes
1	5	Jessica Ennis	Great Britain	7.91	1150	WB
DQ	3	Tatyana Chernova	Russia	~~8.29~~	~~1064~~	
2	6	Nataliya Dobrynska	Ukraine	8.38	1044	
3	2	Hanna Melnychenko	Ukraine	8.45	1028	
4	1	Karolina Tymińska	Poland	8.52	1013	
5	7	Austra Skujytė	Lithuania	8.57	1002	PB
6	4	Ekaterina Bolshova	Russia	8.62	991	
7	8	Yana Maksimava	Belarus	8.80	952	

=== High jump ===
Rank	Name	Nationality	1.66	1.69	1.72	1.75	1.78	1.81	1.84	1.87	1.90	1.93	Result	Points	Notes	Overall
1	Yana Maksimava	Belarus	–	–	–	o	o	o	o	o	o	xxx	1.90	1106	PB	2058
1	Austra Skujytė	Lithuania	–	–	o	o	o	o	o	o	o	xxx	1.90	1106	PB	2108
3	Jessica Ennis	Great Britain	–	–	–	o	o	o	o	xxo	xxx		1.87	1067		2217
4	Ekaterina Bolshova	Russia	–	–	–	o	o	o	xo	xxo	xxx		1.87	1067		2058
5	Nataliya Dobrynska	Ukraine	–	–	o	o	o	o	o	xxx			1.84	1029	SB	2073
6	Hanna Melnychenko	Ukraine	–	o	o	o	o	xo	o	xxx			1.84	1029	SB	2057
DQ	Tatyana Chernova	Russia	–	–	–	o	o	o	xxo	xxx			~~1.84~~	~~1029~~	~~SB~~	~~2093~~
7	Karolina Tymińska	Poland	o	o	o	xxx							1.72	879	SB	1892

=== Shot put ===
Rank	Name	Nationality	#1	#2	#3	Result	Points	Notes	Overall
1	Nataliya Dobrynska	Ukraine	15.25	16.11	16.51	16.51	962	SB	3035
2	Austra Skujytė	Lithuania	15.19	16.26	16.03	16.26	946		3054
3	Yana Maksimava	Belarus	x	14.28	14.85	14.85	851		2909
4	Jessica Ennis	Great Britain	13.89	14.39	14.79	14.79	847	PB	3064
5	Karolina Tymińska	Poland	14.68	14.27	x	14.68	839		2731
DQ	Tatyana Chernova	Russia	~~13.90~~	x	x	~~13.90~~	~~787~~	~~SB~~	~~2880~~
6	Hanna Melnychenko	Ukraine	12.41	13.04	13.29	13.29	747		2804
7	Ekaterina Bolshova	Russia	10.54	12.07	x	12.07	666		2724

=== Long jump ===
Rank	Name	Nationality	#1	#2	#3	Result	Points	Notes	Overall
1	Nataliya Dobrynska	Ukraine	6.41	x	6.57	6.57	1030	SB	4065
2	Ekaterina Bolshova	Russia	6.52	x	6.25	6.52	1014	PB	3738
3	Karolina Tymińska	Poland	x	6.49	6.34	6.49	1004		3735
4	Hanna Melnychenko	Ukraine	x	6.27	x	6.27	934		3738
DQ	Tatyana Chernova	Russia	~~6.22~~	x	~~6.25~~	~~6.25~~	~~927~~		~~3807~~
5	Austra Skujytė	Lithuania	6.24	6.12	6.16	6.24	924		3978
6	Jessica Ennis	Great Britain	6.19	6.18	x	6.19	908		3972
7	Yana Maksimava	Belarus	x	x	5.80	5.80	780		3698

=== 800 metres ===
The 800 metres run was held at 19:37.

Rank	Name	Nationality	Result	Points	Notes
1	Jessica Ennis	Great Britain	2:08.09	993	PB
2	Karolina Tymińska	Poland	2:08.25	990	SB
3	Nataliya Dobrynska	Ukraine	2:11.15	948	PB
DQ	Tatyana Chernova	Russia	~~2:13.23~~	~~918~~	~~SB~~
4	Yana Maksimava	Belarus	2:14.25	903	PB
5	Ekaterina Bolshova	Russia	2:14.43	901	
6	Hanna Melnychenko	Ukraine	2:15.53	885	
7	Austra Skujytė	Lithuania	2:19.99	824	SB

=== Final standings ===
Rank	Name	Nationality	Points	Notes
1st place, gold medalist(s)	Nataliya Dobrynska	Ukraine	5013	WR, CR
2nd place, silver medalist(s)	Jessica Ennis	Great Britain	4965	NR
3rd place, bronze medalist(s)	Austra Skujytė	Lithuania	4802	NR
4	Karolina Tymińska	Poland	4725	SB
DQ	Tatyana Chernova	Russia	~~4725~~	~~SB~~
5	Ekaterina Bolshova	Russia	4639	
6	Hanna Melnychenko	Ukraine	4623	
7	Yana Maksimava	Belarus	4601	
