= Yuri Mikhailovich Orlov =

Yuri Mikhailovich Orlov (April 16, 1928, village Borodinka, Krapivinsky District, Kemerovo Oblast - September 11, 2000, Moscow) was a Russian scientist, professor of pedagogy, psychology and philosophy. He was a practicing psychologist, known for creating the theory and practices of SanoGene (healing) Thinking (SGT). Orlov authored numerous books on personality psychology, including "Self-knowledge and self-education of character", "Climbing to individuality", "Resentment. Guilt", "Shame. Envy", "How to protect love", "Teaching. Formation of man", "The psychology of coercion. The psychology of nonviolence" ,"Healing by philosophy", "The philosophy of hypertension" and many others.

== Biography ==
In 1947–1949, Yuri Orlov studied in Leningrad at the S.M. Kirov Military Medical Academy. However, due to his poor health, he was expelled from it.

After that, Orlov entered the Chelyabinsk Pedagogical Institute with a degree in history. For three years, from 1949 to 1952, he completed a five-year course in absentia and specially developed a well-thought-out "examiner's behavior control system". Simultaneously with his studies, Orlov taught history, psychology and logic at school.

From 1953 to 1956 he studied at the Institute of Philosophy of the Academy of Sciences of the Soviet Union in full-time postgraduate study. He received his Ph.D. in Philosophy for his dissertation on the dialectics of relative and absolute truth in knowledge (scientific advisor - Tavanets).

From 1964 to 1971 he was the head of the Department of Pedagogy and Psychology at the Balashov Pedagogical Institute - a rare case in Soviet times, when a non-partisan person was in charge of the humanitarian department.

From 1969 to 1971, Yuri Mikhailovich lectured on the theory of experiment and mathematical statistics in psychology at the Institute for Advanced Studies of Psychologists at the Academy of Pedagogical Sciences. His lectures were popular with the audience, his lectures (compared to the lectures of mathematics professors from Moscow State University) were clearer, more specific and practical for students of psychologists who strove to master mathematical statistics in psychology. As a result, Orlov was invited to cooperate as a professor.

From 1973 to 2000, Yuri Orlov worked at the Moscow Medical Academy named after Sechenov and headed the Department of Pedagogy and Medical Psychology there. He successfully defended his dissertation for his Doctor of Psychology ("Necessity-motivational factors of the effectiveness of educational activities of university students").

From 1993 to 2000 Yuri Mikhailovich was a full member of the International Academy of Informatization and President of the Department of Psychology of this academy.

He died in 2000. Buried at the Khovanskoye Cemetery.

== Works ==
Some developments by Yuri Orlov:

- the concept of teaching effectiveness;
- questionnaires to measure the needs for achievement in affiliation and dominance, anxiety in the examination situation;
- cognitive-emotive test (CET) for measuring certain types of reflection;
- the new concept of "need profile";
- the concept of the motivational syndrome of need;
- developed the theory and practice of SanoGenic Thinking (SGT) as a method of human health improvement and the technology of teaching sanogenic reflection, while SHM is used in the system of psychohygiene and health improvement.

Orlov is the author of more than 30 books on personality psychology, human upbringing and health improvement, he has written over 100 articles in scientific and popular magazines, regularly gave lectures, and led an active social life. In recent years, Orlov taught a systematic course in philosophy and psychology of sanogenic thinking at the Polytechnic Museum, and participated in scientific programs.

In his works, Yuri Orlov criticized the theory of activity: "I pretended to share this lean Activity theory by Leontiev, which, in general, led psychology to a dead end".

== Family ==
- Wife: Elena Ivanovna Krasnikova is a psychologist;
- Son: Ivan is a photographer.
