= Vladimir Pavlov =

Vladimir Pavlov may refer to:

- Vladimir Pavlov (politician, born 1956), Russian politician
- Vladimir Pavlov (politician, born 1976), Russian politician
- Vladimir Pavlov (politician, born 1941) (1941—2021), Ukrainian politician and member of the 1990–1994 parliament
- Vladimir Pavlov (politician, born 1915), a Soviet politician and Member of the Central Committee elected by the 19th Congress of the Communist Party of the Soviet Union
