= Sara Aerts =

Belgian athlete (born 1984)

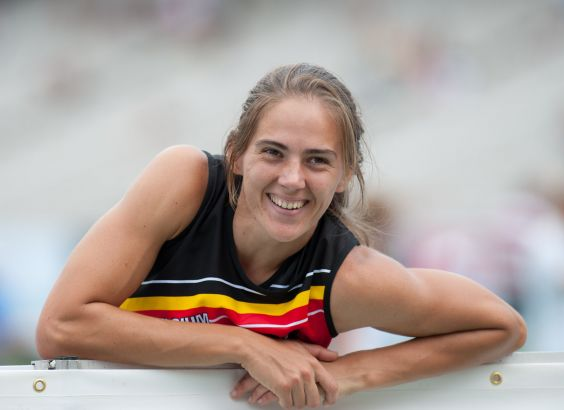
- Aerts at the 2010 European Athletics Championships

Personal information
- Full name: Sara Aerts
- Born: 25 January 1984 (age 42) Turnhout, Belgium
- Height: 1.81 m (5 ft 11 in)
- Weight: 64 kg (141 lb)

Sport
- Country: Belgium
- Sport: Athletics
- Event: Heptathlon

Sara Aerts (born 25 January 1984) is a Belgian athlete who specialises in the heptathlon and bobsledder.

Aerts was born in Turnhout. She competed at the 2012 Summer Olympics in the heptathlon but did not finish the competition.

== Competition record ==
| Year | Competition | Venue | Position | Event | Notes |
Representing Belgium
| 2001 | World Youth Championships | Debrecen, Hungary | 17th | Heptathlon (youth) | 4622 pts |
| 2005 | European U23 Championships | Erfurt, Germany | 11th | Heptathlon | 5530 pts |
| 2007 | Universiade | Bangkok, Thailand | 2nd | Heptathlon | 5904 pts |
| 2008 | Hypo-Meeting | Götzis, Austria | 20th | Heptathlon | 6048 pts |
| 2009 | World Championships | Berlin, Germany | – | Heptathlon | DNF |
| 2010 | Hypo-Meeting | Götzis, Austria | – | Heptathlon | DNF |
| 2010 | European Championships | Barcelona, Spain | 12th | Heptathlon | 6084 pts |
| 2011 | European Indoor Championships | Paris, France | 12th | Pentathlon | 4282 pts |
| 2011 | World Championships | Daegu, South Korea | – | Heptathlon | DNF |
| 2012 | European Championships | Helsinki, Finland | – | Heptathlon | DNF |
| 2012 | Olympic Games | London, United Kingdom | – | Heptathlon | DNF |
| 2013 | European Indoor Championships | Gothenburg, Sweden | 14th (sf) | 60 m hurdles | 8.14 s |
| 2014 | World Indoor Championships | Sopot, Poland | 14th (sf) | 60 m hurdles | 8.10 s |
