= Elisa Trevisan =

Italian heptathlete

Personal information
- Nationality: Italian
- Born: 5 March 1980 (age 46) Castelfranco Veneto
- Height: 1.67 m (5 ft 5 1/2 in)
- Weight: 60 kg (130 lb)

Sport
- Country: Italy
- Sport: Athletics
- Event: Women's heptathlon
- Club: G.S. Fiamme Azzurre
- Coached by: Aldo Lorenzato

Achievements and titles
- Personal best: Heptathlon: 5844 (2004)

Elisa Trevisan (born 5 March 1980) is a former Italian female heptathlete.

== Biography ==
She finished 24th at the 2006 European Championships and has won five times at the Italian Athletics Championships. She has had ten caps for the national team.

== Progression ==
Heptathlon

Personal Best

Year	Performance	Venue	Date
2013	5345	(Estonia) Tallinn	30 June
2012	5574	(Italy) Bressanone	8 July
2011	5706	(Italy) Bressanone	3 July
2010	5358	(Italy) Rossano Veneto	25 April
2009	5478	(Italy) Desenzano del Garda	10 May
2008	5646	(Italy) Desenzano del Garda	11 May
2007	5716	(Estonia) Tallinn	8 July
2006	5807	(Italy) Florence	3 June
2005	5744	(Italy) Forlì	2 October
2004	5844	(Italy) Desenzano del Garda	25 July
2003	5498	(Italy) Rieti	2 August
2002	5189	(Italy) Viareggio	20 July
2001	4992		1 January

== Achievements ==
Year	Competition	Venue	Position	Event	Performance	Notes
2006	European Championships	(Sweden) Gothenburg	24th	Heptathlon	5693 pts	
2007	Summer Universiade	(Thailand) Bangkok	6th	Heptathlon	5657 pts	
2013	European Cup Combined Events	(Estonia) Tallinn	20th	Heptathlon	5345 pts	SB

== National titles ==
She won five times the national championships.

- Italian Athletics Championships
  - Heptathlon: 2005, 2006, 2007, 2011, 2012

== See also ==
- Italian all-time lists - Heptathlon
