= Daniel Shilkov =

Russian politician

Member of Parliament Daniel Shilkov
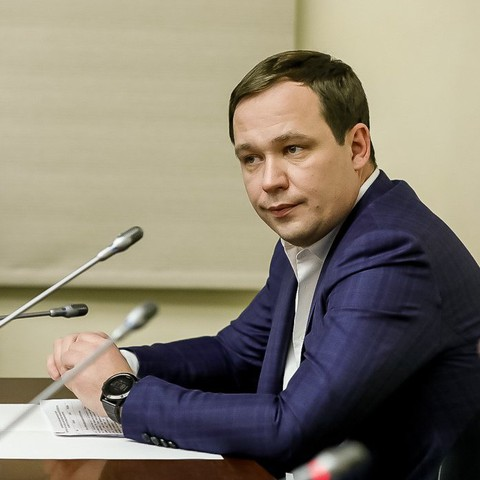
- Daniel Shilkov

Deputy of the State Duma
- Incumbent
- Assumed office September 18, 2016
- Constituency: Sverdlovsk Oblast

Member of the State Duma Committee on Financial Markets
- Incumbent
- Assumed office October, 2016

Deputy Chairman of the State Duma Committee on reliability of financial disclosures by State Duma deputies
- Incumbent
- Assumed office October 2016

Personal details
- Born: Daniel Evgenyevich Shilkov; September 25, 1982 (age 44) Sverdlovsk region
- Citizenship: Russian Federation
- Party: Liberal Democratic Party of Russia
- Education: Ural State Technical University (2004)
- Occupation: Politician

Daniel Evgenyevich Shilkov (Russian: Данил Евгеньевич Шилков; born September 25, 1982, in the Sverdlovsk Oblast) is a Russian politician, a deputy of the 7th State Duma of the Russian Federation.

== Biography ==
=== Education ===
Shilkov studied arts education at Ural State Technical University, graduating in 2004. He also studied economic theory at Ural Federal University in 2016.

=== State Duma of the Russian Federation ===
In 2016, Shilkov was elected as a deputy in the State Duma, the lower house of the Federal Assembly of Russia. He is a representative for the Sverdlovsk region. His first day in office was September 18, 2016. He is a member of the State Duma Committee on Financial Markets, and is also deputy chairman of the committee that is responsible to ensure accuracy of the financial and property disclosures submitted by deputies.

Shilkov and fellow LDPR deputy Vitaly Pashin presented a bill in support of animal rights to the State Duma on December 1, 2016. If passed into law, the bill would create a national animal ombudsman to protect the interests of both domestic and wild animals in Russia.
