= 2005 European Athletics U23 Championships – Women's heptathlon =

The women's heptathlon event at the 2005 European Athletics U23 Championships was held in Erfurt, Germany, at Steigerwaldstadion on 14 and 15 July.

== Medalists ==
Gold	Laurien Hoos; Netherlands
Silver	Lilli Schwarzkopf; Germany
Bronze	Olga Levenkova; Russia

== Results ==
=== Final ===
14-15 July

The highest mark recorded in each event is highlighted in yellow

Rank	Name	Nationality	100m H	HJ	SP	200m	LJ	JT	800m	Points	Notes
1st place, gold medalist(s)	Laurien Hoos	Netherlands	13.53 (w: 1.2 m/s)	1.77	15.03	24.61 (w: -1.7 m/s)	6.04 (w: 0.6 m/s)	49.77	2:21.76	6291	CR
2nd place, silver medalist(s)	Lilli Schwarzkopf	Germany	13.72 (w: 1.2 m/s)	1.77	13.21	25.87 (w: -1.7 m/s)	6.12 (w: -0.5 m/s)	50.21	2:11.94	6196	
3rd place, bronze medalist(s)	Olga Levenkova	Russia	13.72 (w: 1.2 m/s)	1.74	12.81	25.27 (w: -0.5 m/s)	6.23 (w: 0.5 m/s)	38.55	2:15.04	5950	
4	Viktorija Žemaitytė	Lithuania	14.32 (w: 0.3 m/s)	1.83	12.40	25.39 (w: -0.5 m/s)	6.18 (w: -0.7 m/s)	42.45	2:21.34	5913	
5	Antoinette Nana Djimou Ida	France	13.72 (w: 1.2 m/s)	1.68	12.90	25.34 (w: -1.7 m/s)	5.93 (w: 0.7 m/s)	44.65	2:23.06	5792	
6	Jolanda Keizer	Netherlands	14.40 (w: -0.2 m/s)	1.80	13.06	24.87 (w: -0.6 m/s)	5.83 (w: 1.0 m/s)	40.88	2:25.75	5760	
7	Maren Schwerdtner	Germany	14.05 (w: 0.3 m/s)	1.77	12.28	24.60 (w: -0.5 m/s)	5.79 (w: -0.4 m/s)	38.10	2:28.79	5641	
8	Jessica Samuelsson	Sweden	14.22 (w: -0.2 m/s)	1.68	12.90	24.73 (w: -0.6 m/s)	5.95 (w: 0.5 m/s)	31.51	2:15.64	5633	
9	Esēnija Volžankina	Latvia	13.71 (w: 1.2 m/s)	1.68	12.18	24.63 (w: -1.7 m/s)	5.82 (w: 0.0 m/s)	34.92	2:21.20	5616	
10	Cecilia Ricali	Italy	14.17 (w: -0.2 m/s)	1.71	11.05	25.58 (w: -0.6 m/s)	6.08 (w: 0.5 m/s)	34.16	2:12.57	5610	
11	Sara Aerts	Belgium	13.70 (w: 0.3 m/s)	1.74	12.96	25.46 (w: -0.5 m/s)	5.44 (w: -0.2 m/s)	34.98	2:23.08	5530	
12	Amandine Constantin	France	13.78 (w: 0.3 m/s)	1.77	11.30	24.87 (w: -0.5 m/s)	5.60 (w: -0.8 m/s)	36.72	2:27.63	5521	
13	Hanna Melnychenko	Ukraine	14.10 (w: 0.3 m/s)	1.74	11.46	25.62 (w: -0.5 m/s)	6.15 (w: 0.0 m/s)	33.55	2:26.35	5502	
14	Kaie Kand	Estonia	14.12 (w: 1.2 m/s)	1.68	12.23	25.77 (w: -1.7 m/s)	5.67 (w: 1.0 m/s)	30.77	2:13.35	5441	
15	Beata Lewicka	Poland	15.24 (w: -0.2 m/s)	1.68	13.68	26.63 (w: -0.6 m/s)	5.53 (w: -0.1 m/s)	35.58	2:15.41	5335	
16	Györgyi Farkas	Hungary	15.09 (w: -0.2 m/s)	1.77	9.68	26.49 (w: -0.6 m/s)	5.77 (w: -0.2 m/s)	41.54	2:24.15	5280	
17	Anu Teesaar	Estonia	15.15 (w: -0.2 m/s)	1.68	13.31	27.48 (w: -0.6 m/s)	5.62 (w: 0.3 m/s)	43.20	2:28.98	5242	
18	Anna Kryazheva	Russia	14.71 (w: -0.2 m/s)	1.71	13.17	DNF	5.90 (w: 0.4 m/s)	38.91	2:18.54	4794	
19	Louise Hazel	Great Britain	13.66 (w: 0.3 m/s)	1.62	11.15	24.72 (w: -0.5 m/s)	NM	24.55	2:25.97	4422	
	Karolina Tymińska	Poland	14.22 (w: -1.2 m/s)	1.65	13.51	24.88 (w: -1.7 m/s)				DNF	

== Participation ==
According to an unofficial count, 20 athletes from 14 countries participated in the event.

- Belgium (1)
- Estonia (2)
- France (2)
- Germany (2)
- Great Britain (1)
- Hungary (1)
- Italy (1)
- Latvia (1)
- Lithuania (1)
- Netherlands (2)
- Poland (2)
- Russia (2)
- Sweden (1)
- Ukraine (1)
