= Oleg Golikov =

Russian politician

Oleg Golikov MP
- Олег Голиков
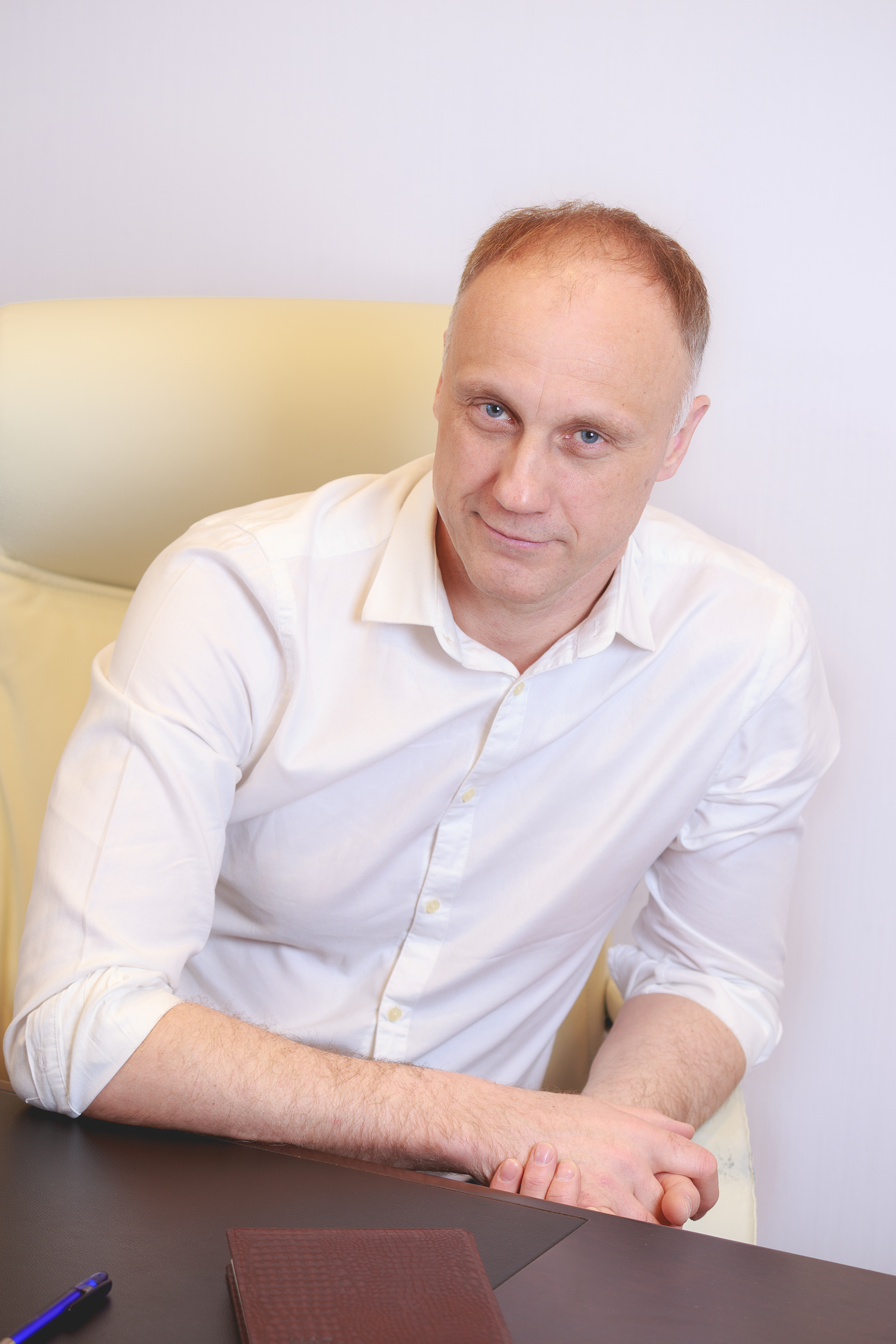

Member of the State Duma (Party List Seat)
- Incumbent
- Assumed office 12 October 2021

Personal details
- Born: 21 October 1968 (age 57) Chesma, Chelyabinsk Oblast, Russian SFSR, USSR
- Party: United Russia
- Education: South Ural State University

Oleg Alexandrovich Golikov (Russian: Олег Александрович Голиков; born 21 October 1968, Chesma, Chelyabinsk Oblast) is a Russian political figure and a deputy of the 8th State Duma.

From 1996 to 1998, Golikov worked at the administration of the Kalininsky district in Chelyabinsk. In 2012–2019, he was the deputy director of the All-Russian Scientific Research Institute Of Technical Physics. From 2005 to 2021, he was the deputy of the Legislative Assembly of Chelyabinsk Oblast. In September 2021, he was elected to the 8th State Duma from the Rostov Oblast constituency.

He is one of the members of the State Duma the United States Treasury sanctioned on 24 March 2022 in response to the 2022 Russian invasion of Ukraine.

Since February 2022, he organized fundraising efforts and delivered several humanitarian aid shipments to Donbas; in October 2022, he became a volunteer.

On September 3, 2025, the Khmelnytskyi City District Court of Khmelnytskyi Oblast found Oleg Golikov guilty under Part 3 of Article 110 of the Criminal Code of Ukraine (“Encroachment on the territorial integrity and inviolability of Ukraine”). The court sentenced Golikov to 15 years of imprisonment with confiscation of all property belonging to him in favor of the state of Ukraine.
