= Oleg Tsepkin =

Russian politician

- Олег Цепкин
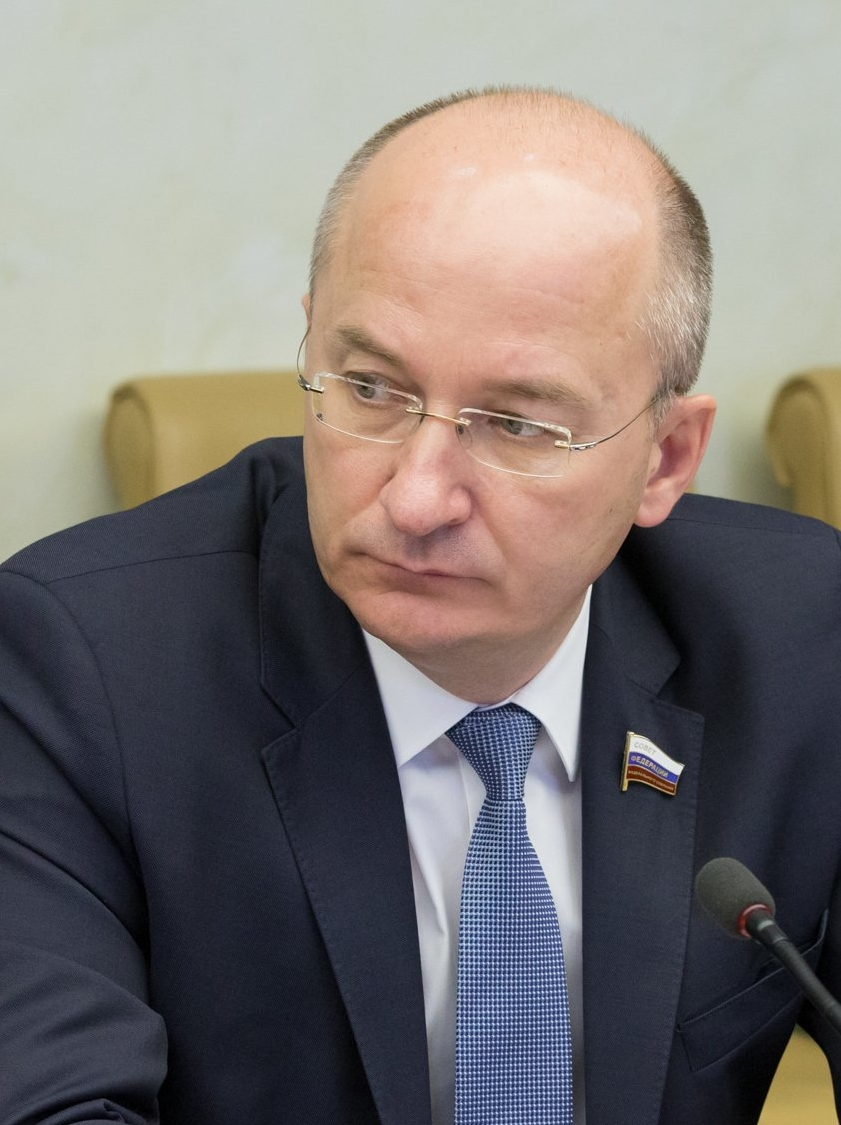

Senator from Chelyabinsk Oblast
- Incumbent
- Assumed office 8 October 2020
- Preceded by: Konstantin Tsybko

Personal details
- Born: Oleg Tsepkin; 15 September 1965 (age 61) Ruza, Ruzsky District, Moscow Oblast, Russian Soviet Socialist Republic, Soviet Union
- Party: United Russia
- Education: Magnitogorsk State Technical University

Oleg Vladimirovich Tsepkin (Russian: Олег Владимирович Цепкин; born 15 September 1965) is a Russian politician serving as a senator from Chelyabinsk Oblast since 8 October 2020.

== Biography ==
Oleg Tsepkin was born on 15 September 1965 in Ruza, Ruzsky District, Moscow Oblast. In 1987, he graduated from the Magnitogorsk State Technical University. Afterwards, he worked as a repairman at the Magnitogorsk Iron and Steel Works (MISW). From 1995 to 1997, he was the technical director of the CJSC "Emal". From 1998 to 2005, he was the Head of the Department for Coordinating the Activities of Subsidiary Joint-Stock Companies and Institutions of Magnitogorsk Iron and Steel Works. From 2009 to 2011, he was the Head of the Control Department of the MISW. On 14 March 2010, Tsepkin was elected to the Magnitogorsk City Council of Deputies of the 4th convocation. In 2015, he was appointed Deputy Head of the Magnezit company. On 13 September 2015, he was elected deputy of the Legislative Assembly of Chelyabinsk Oblast of the 6th convocation. On 24 September 2015, he became the senator from the Legislative Assembly of Chelyabinsk Oblast. On 8 October 2020, he was re-elected.

=== Sanctions ===
Oleg Tsepkin is under personal sanctions introduced by the European Union, the United Kingdom, the USA, Canada, Switzerland, Australia, Ukraine, New Zealand, for ratifying the decisions of the "Treaty of Friendship, Cooperation and Mutual Assistance between the Russian Federation and the Donetsk People's Republic and between the Russian Federation and the Luhansk People's Republic" and providing political and economic support for Russia's annexation of Ukrainian territories.
