= Blandine Maisonnier =

French heptathlete (born 1986)

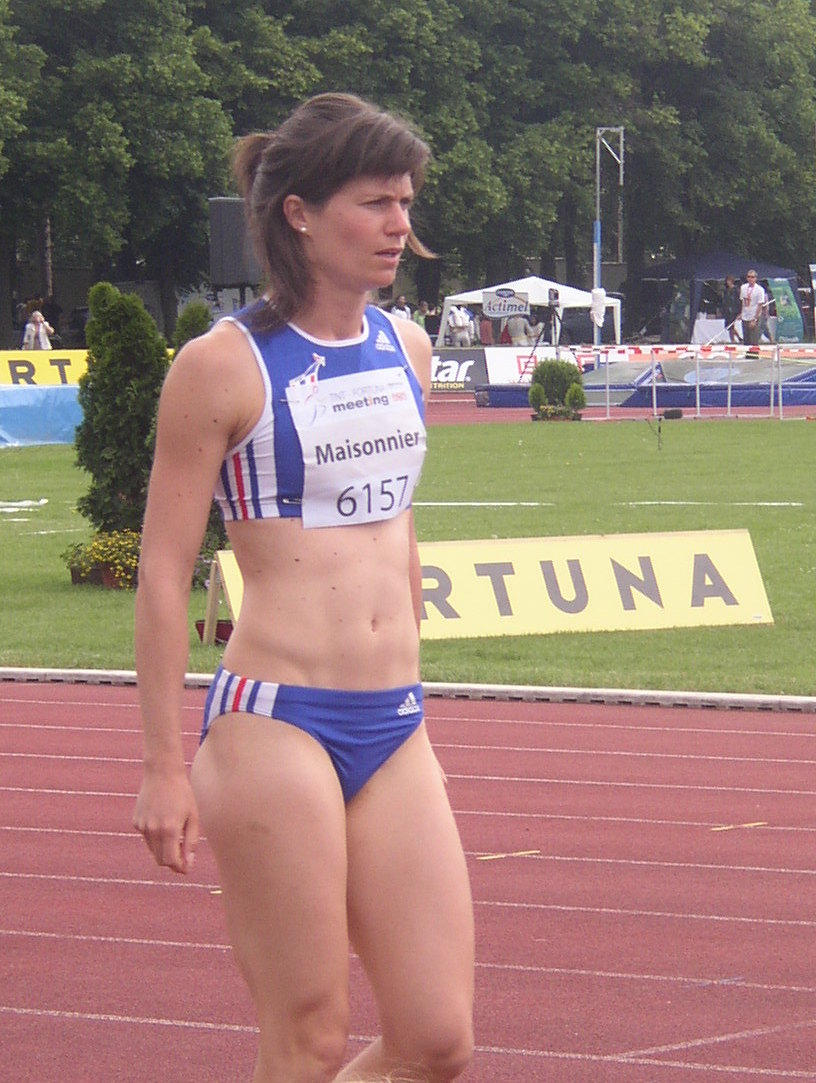
- Maisonnier at Kladno in 2010

Personal information
- Born: 3 January 1986 (age 40) Lille, France
- Height: 1.79 m (5 ft 10 in)
- Weight: 65 kg (143 lb)

Sport
- Country: France
- Sport: Athletics
- Event: Heptathlon
- Club: Entente Sud Lyonnais
- Coached by: Daniel Aligne

Blandine Maisonnier (born 3 January 1986 in Lille) is a French athlete, who specializes in the heptathlon. In 2012, she took second place in the heptathlon at the Multistars meeting.

== International competitions ==
- 2007 European Championship Under 23s at Debrecen:
  - 10th : 5 894 points

== National titles ==
- French Athletics Championships
  - Heptathlon: 2008, 2011
- French Indoor Athletics Championships
  - Pentathlon: 2008, 2011, 2012

== Personal bests ==
Outdoors

Discipline	Performance	Date	Location
100 m	12.37	3 June 2007	Vénissieux
200 m	24.78	14 July 2007	Debrecen
800 m	2:13.06	8 June 2008	Arles
100 m hurdles	13.87	25 May 2007	Bourgoin-Jallieu
400 m hurdles	59.53	4 May 2008	Vénissieux
High jump	1.81 m	24 May 2008	Bourgoin-Jallieu
Long jump	6.37 m	31 May 2008	Genève
Triple jump	13.18 m	10 June 2007	Tours
Shot put	12.92 m	4 April 2008	Vénissieux
Javelin	40.25 m	24 June 2007	Annecy
Heptathlon	6157 pts	8 June 2008	Arles
Heptathlon (junior)	5149 pts	22 June 2003	Évian-les-Bains

Indoors

Disciplines	Performance	Dates	Location
High jump	1.78 m	19 January 2008	Aubière
Long jump	6.03 m	20 January 2008	Aubière
Shot put	11.44 m	19 January 2008	Aubière
Pentathlon	4355 pts	1 March 2008	Paris
