= Natalya Kotova =

- Наталья Котова
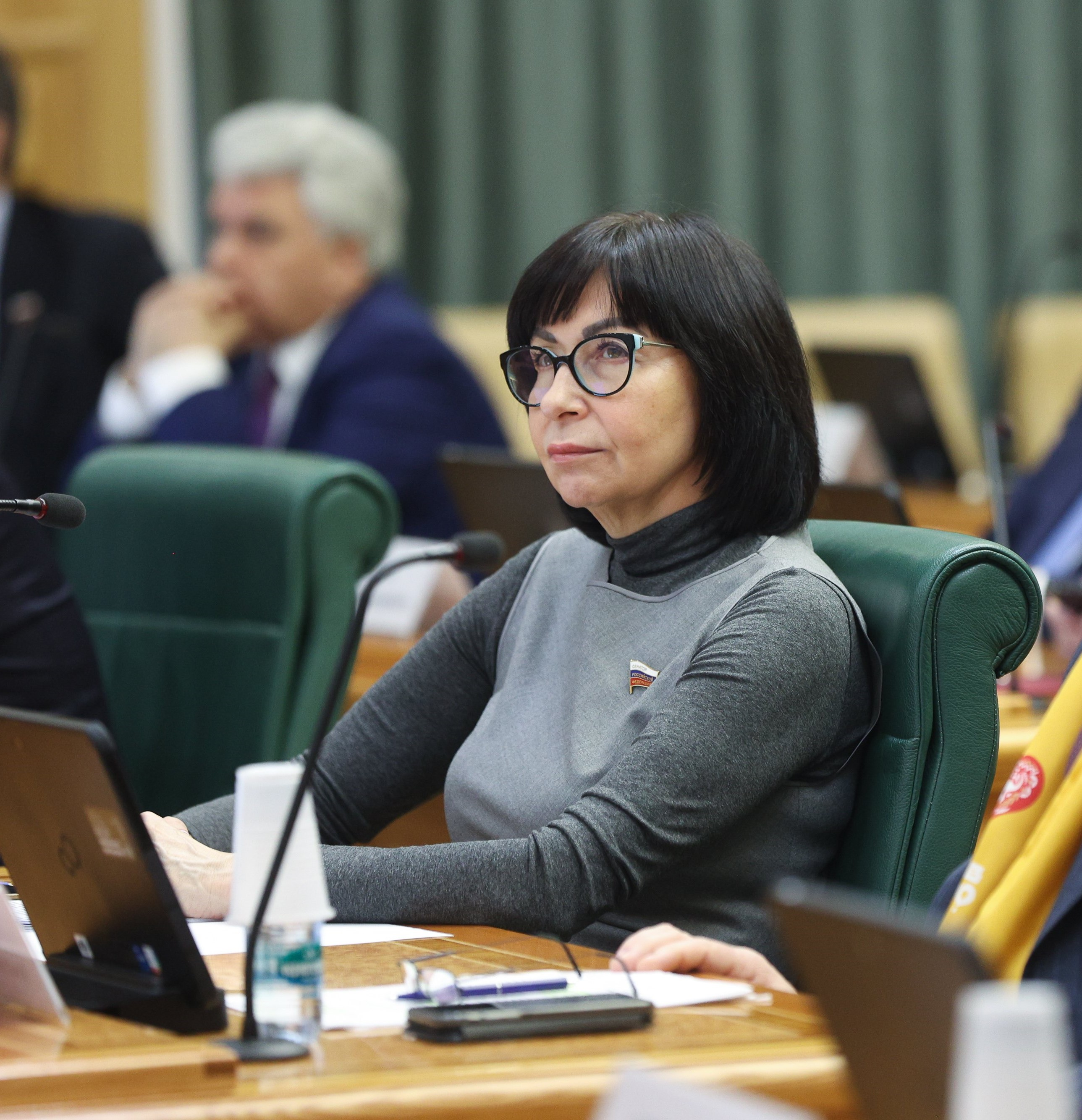

Senator from Chelyabinsk Oblast
- Incumbent
- Assumed office 20 September 2024
- Preceded by: Margarita Pavlova

Mayor of Chelyabinsk
- In office 20 November 2019 – 24 September 2024
- Preceded by: Vladimir Yelistratov
- Succeeded by: Aleksey Loshkin

Personal details
- Born: 14 August 1965 (age 60) Techensky, RSFSR, Soviet Union
- Party: United Russia
- Education: Chelyabinsk State Pedagogical University
- Awards: Medal of the Order "For Merit to the Fatherland"; Badge of Distinction "For Services to the Chelyabinsk Oblast"

Natalya Petrovna Kotova (Russian: Наталья Петровна Котова; born August 14, 1965, Techensky, Chelyabinsk Oblast) is a Russian politician. She has served as a Senator of the Federation Council representing the executive body of state power of the Chelyabinsk Oblast since September 20, 2024. She was appointed to the Federation Council Committee on Science, Education, and Culture. She was transferred to the Federation Council Committee on Agrarian and Food Policy and Environmental Management (since October 8, 2025). Previously she served as Mayor of Chelyabinsk from November 19, 2019, to September 24, 2024. She is the first woman to become the mayor of Chelyabinsk.

== Biography ==
She was born into a family of farmers at Techensky. After completing elementary school in the village of Techensky, she attended Muslyumovskaya Secondary School, living, like all children from small villages, in the school's boarding school. She was an active Komsomol member at school.

In 1987, she graduated from the Chelyabinsk State Pedagogical Institute as a secondary school physics and astronomy teacher and worked in her specialty at Chelyabinsk School No. 63. In 1994, she transferred to the Chelyabinsk Regional Committee for State Property Management. Two years later, she graduated from the Chelyabinsk Institute of the Ural Academy of Public Administration with a degree in jurisprudence. From 1996 to 1999, she was a leading specialist and then head of department at the territorial agency of the Federal Insolvency (Bankruptcy) Administration. Until 2001, she served as Deputy Head of the Ural Interregional Territorial Body of the Federal Service for Financial Recovery and Bankruptcy, and later as Head of Department of the Federal Tax Service for the Chelyabinsk Region.

Since 2005, she has served in the Chelyabinsk City Hall as Head of the Housing Policy Department, then as First Deputy Mayor. On June 24, 2019, she was appointed Acting Mayor of Chelyabinsk, replacing Vladimir Yelistratov. On November 19, at a meeting of the City Duma, she was unanimously elected Mayor of Chelyabinsk, and took office the following day.

Opposition politicians challenged her assumption of office. In February 2020, Yaroslav Shcherbakov, chairman of the Chelyabinsk regional branch of the Yabloko party, filed a lawsuit to annul the results of the competition to elect Natalia Kotova as mayor of Chelyabinsk. On June 5, the Sovetsky District Court dismissed the lawsuit seeking to invalidate the results of the competition for the post of mayor of Chelyabinsk, which Natalia Kotova won.

In 2024, she was appointed to the Federation Council from the executive branch of the Chelyabinsk Region. She replaced Margarita Pavlova.

In 2021, she went on an educational trip to the United Arab Emirates, which became the source of a significant regional political scandal.

Yaroslav Shcherbakov, Chairman of the Chelyabinsk Regional Branch of the Yabloko Party, drew attention to the cost of the trip and the discrepancy between the dates indicated in government procurement documents and Natalya Kotova's actual trip dates.

Furthermore, in 2021, Oleg Izvekov, Deputy Mayor of Chelyabinsk for Economic Development, was convicted. He was fined 22.5 million rubles and disqualified from holding certain positions in the civil service and local government for four years. The conviction was based on a corruption offense: during the coronavirus pandemic, the official received a bribe of 450,000 rubles for preferential treatment in the supply of thermal imaging devices for remote temperature measurement.

The political scandal culminated in a prosecutor's office investigation into the Chelyabinsk administration's expenses related to the expensive trip. In 2023, journalists criticized Natalya Kotova for the state of green spaces in Chelyabinsk, which, according to experts, is quite deplorable: for every resident of the capital of the Southern Urals, there are only four square meters of parks and alleys, instead of the required eleven. Civil activists and journalists are also outraged by the high level of spending on pre-New Year's illuminations. For example, in the lead-up to 2023, 86 million rubles were allocated for this purpose alone, just to decorate the pedestrian section of Kirov Street in the Central District of Chelyabinsk.

In January 2024, petitions appeared on Change.org demanding Natalya Kotova's resignation, citing her inability to fulfill her duties as mayor. The mayor's office stated: "Such a procedure in any form is not grounds for considering her resignation". However, Kotova's popularity as a politician in the Chelyabinsk region is questionable: 72% of residents of the regional center rated her performance as mayor negatively. Municipal deputies Elena Vakhtina, Marsel Khaziev, and Roman Nikitin have actively criticized the mayor for corruption, the failure to address public utility issues, and shortcomings in environmental policy and renovation. The snow collapse—the failure to clear the city of snow and ice in the winter of 2023—was a particularly significant problem. In response to the aforementioned criticism, Natalya Kotova stated only that unscrupulous contractors had been fined 200 million rubles.
