= Margarita Pavlova =

Russian politician (born 1979)

- Маргарита Павлова
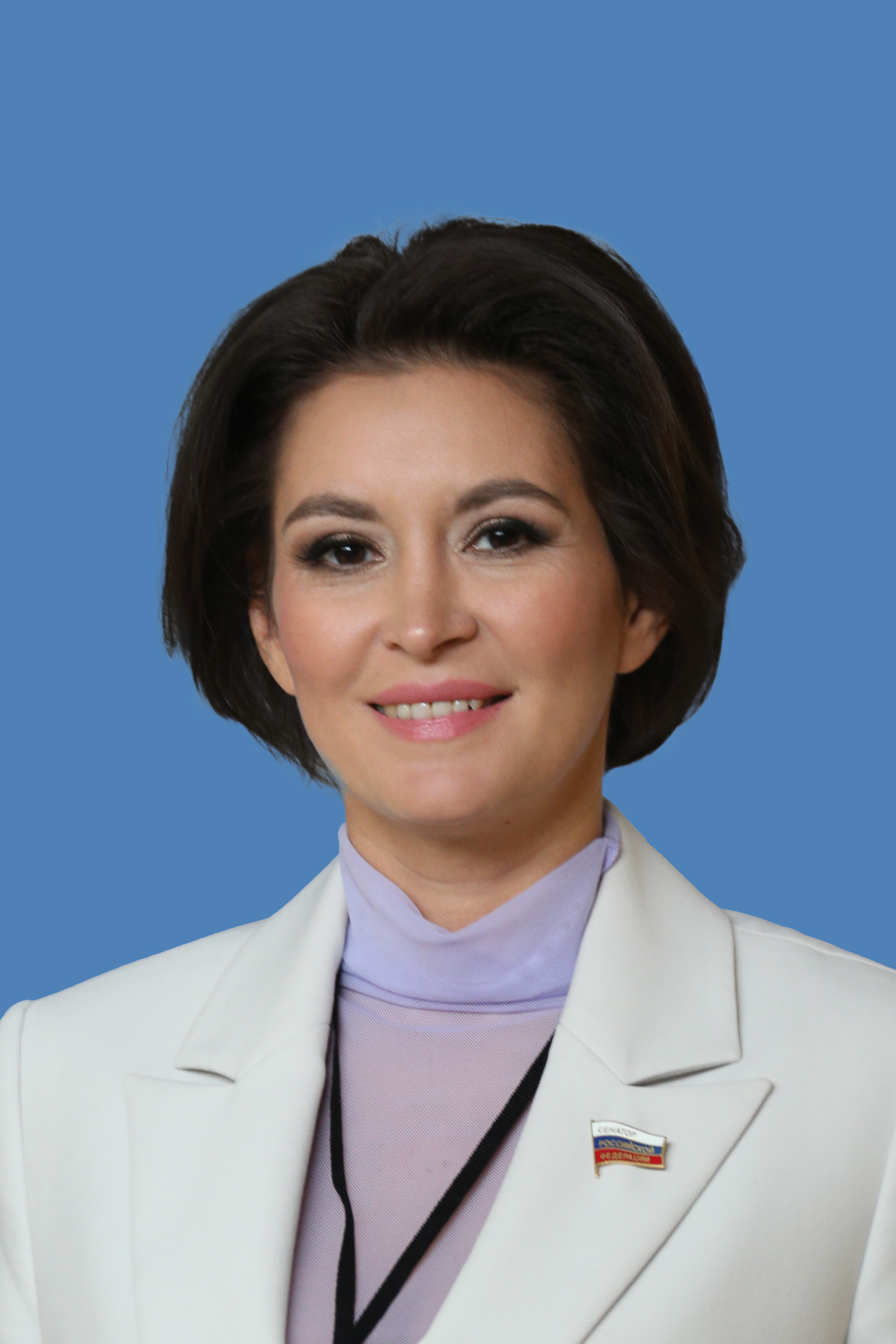
- Pavlova in 2021

Senator from Chelyabinsk Oblast
- In office 20 September 2019 – 20 September 2024
- Preceded by: Irina Gecht
- Succeeded by: Natalya Kotova

Personal details
- Born: Margarita Pavlova; 22 January 1979 (age 47) Chelyabinsk Oblast, Soviet Union
- Education: Chelyabinsk State Institute of Culture

Margarita Nikolayevna Pavlova (Russian: Маргарита Николаевна Павлова; born 22 January 1979) is a Russian politician serving as a senator from Chelyabinsk Oblast since 20 September 2019.

== Career ==
Margarita Pavlova was born on 22 January 1979 in Chelyabinsk Oblast, Soviet Union. In 2000, she graduated from the Chelyabinsk State Institute of Culture. From 2010 to 2015, she served as a commissioner for children's rights in the Chelyabinsk oblast. In 2015, she was re-appointed to the same position. On 20 September 2019, she was appointed a senator from Chelyabinsk Oblast.

== Sanctions ==
Margarita Pavlova is under personal sanctions introduced by the European Union, the United Kingdom, the US, Canada, Switzerland, Australia, Ukraine, and New Zealand, for ratifying the decisions of the "Treaty of Friendship, Cooperation and Mutual Assistance between the Russian Federation and the Donetsk People's Republic and between the Russian Federation and the Luhansk People's Republic" and providing political and economic support for Russia's annexation of Ukrainian territories.
