= Vladimir Pavlov (politician, born 1976) =

Russian politician

- Владимир Павлов
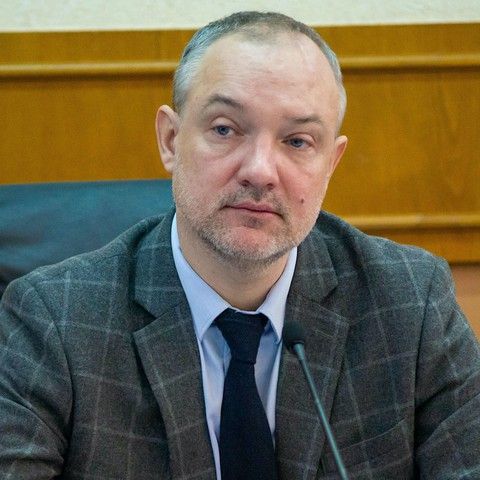

Member of the State Duma for Chelyabinsk Oblast
- Incumbent
- Assumed office 12 October 2021
- Preceded by: Andrey Baryshev
- Constituency: Chelyabinsk (No. 189)

Personal details
- Born: 1 June 1976 (age 50) Chelyabinsk, RSFSR, USSR
- Party: United Russia
- Education: Magnitogorsk State Technical University; RANEPA; South Ural State University

Vladimir Victorovich Pavlov (Russian: Владимир Викторович Павлов; born 1 June 1976 in Chelyabinsk) is a Russian political figure and a deputy of the 8th State Duma.

In 1998, he started working at large industrial enterprises. He also was the assistant to the deputy of the Legislative Assembly of Chelyabinsk Oblast. From 2011 to 2012, Pavlov was the Minister of Industry and Mineral Resources of the Chelyabinsk Oblast. In 2017, he was appointed docent of the Higher School of Economics. From 2020 to 2021, he was the deputy of the Legislative Assembly of Chelyabinsk Oblast of the 7th convocation. Since September 2021, he has served as deputy of the 8th State Duma.
