= Ekaterina Bolshova =

Russian heptathlete

Personal information
- Nationality: Russian
- Born: 4 February 1988 (age 37); Saint Petersburg, Russia

Sport
- Country: Russia
- Sport: Track and field
- Event: Heptathlon

Ekaterina Bolshova (Russian: Екатерина Серге́евна Большова; born 4 February 1988, in Saint Petersburg) is a Russian heptathlete.

Her personal best in the indoor pentathlon is 4896 points, achieved in February 2012 while winning the Russian title. This ranked her fifth on the all-time lists. In heptathlon her personal best result is 5738, achieved in May 2005 in Daegu. Bolshova got sixth place at 2012 World Indoor Championships and came fifth in the heptathlon at the 2012 European Athletics Championships.

She won the Russian indoor title a second time in February 2013 and recorded a total of points, including personal bests of 6.57 m in the long jump and 2:10.52 minutes in the 800 metres.

== Achievements ==
Year	Competition	Venue	Position	Event	Notes
Representing Russia
2012	World Indoor Championships	Istanbul, Turkey	6th	Pentathlon	4639
2012	European Championships	Helsinki, Finland	5th	Heptathlon	6298
