= Chelyabinsk State Pedagogical University =

Public University in Russia

Coordinates: 55.1590°N 61.3878°E

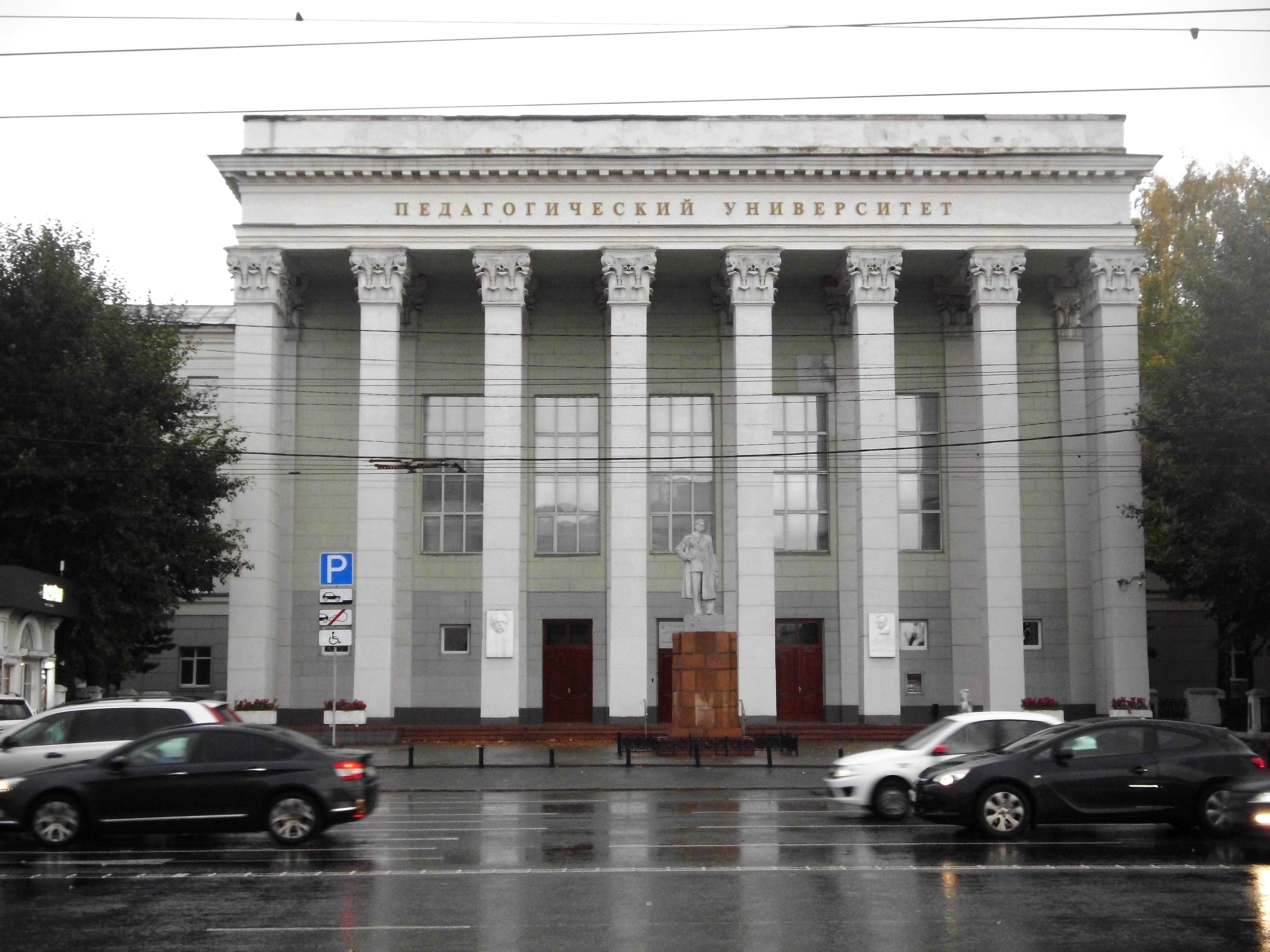
South Ural State Humanitarian Pedagogical University

South Ural State Humanitarian Pedagogical University is a public university in Chelyabinsk, Russia. It was established in 1934. In 1995, the institute obtained a status of university and was renamed into Chelyabinsk State Pedagogical University. It is the only specialized pedagogical university in the Chelyabinsk region.
