= Aleksey Teksler =

Russian politician (born 1973)

- Алексей Текслер
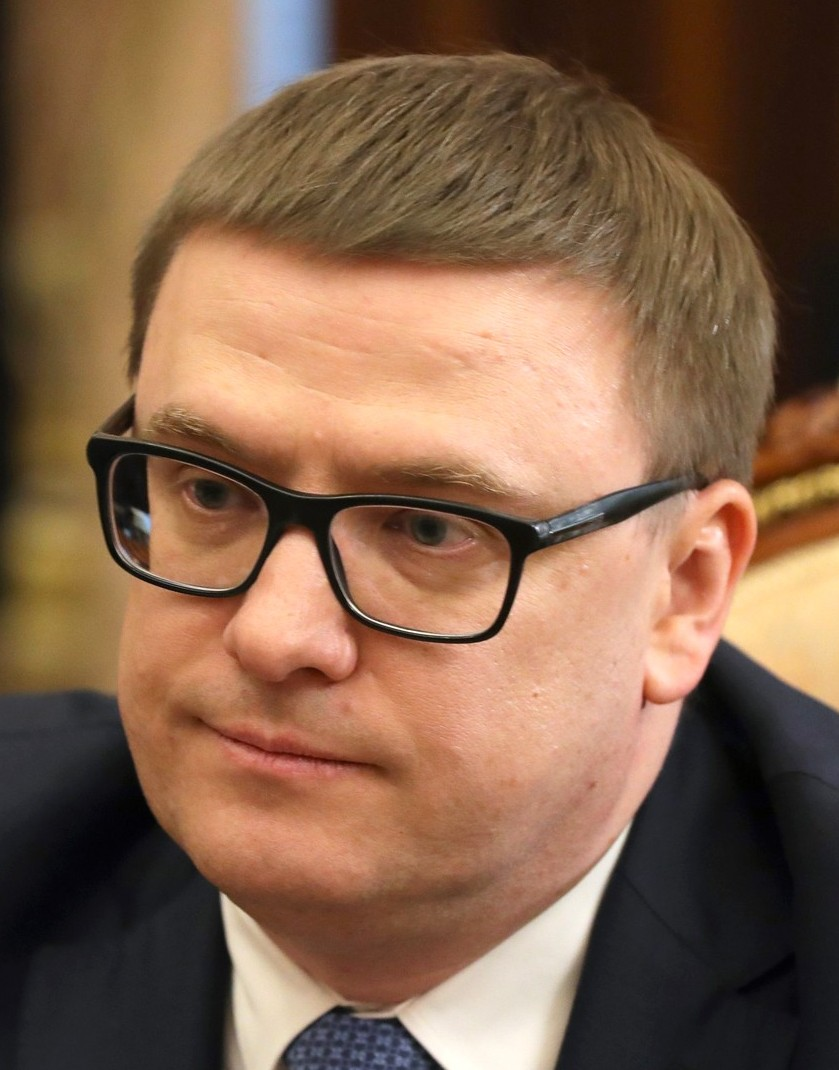
- Teksler in 2019

5th Governor of Chelyabinsk Oblast
- Incumbent
- Assumed office 20 September 2019
- Preceded by: Boris Dubrovsky

Governor of Chelyabinsk Oblast (acting)
- In office 19 March 2019 – 20 September 2019

First Deputy Minister of Energy of the Russian Federation
- In office 18 November 2014 – 19 March 2019
- Preceded by: position established
- Succeeded by: position abolished

Head of the Norilsk City Administration
- In office 6 March 2008 – 30 June 2009
- Preceded by: Vladen Aleksanderovich (acting)
- Succeeded by: Aleksey Ruzhinkov

Personal details
- Born: Aleksey Leonidovich Teksler; 19 January 1973 (age 53) Chelyabinsk, Russian SFSR, Soviet Union
- Party: United Russia (since 2020)
- Education: Norilsk Industrial Institute

Aleksey Leonidovich Teksler (Russian: Алексей Леонидович Текслер; born 19 January 1973) is a Russian statesman and politician who is currently the 5th Governor of Chelyabinsk Oblast since 20 September 2019. He is also the secretary of the Chelyabinsk regional branch of the United Russia party since 2 October 2020.

== Biography ==
Aleksey Teksler was born on 19 January 1973 in Chelyabinsk in a family of employees, lived in the Metallurgical District. His family moved to Norilsk later when he was 16 years old. His father, Leonid Azikovich, before moving to Norilsk, worked at the Chelyabinsk Mechanical Plant, liquidator of the consequences of the accident at the Chernobyl nuclear power plant, and was awarded the Order of Courage. His mother worked in Chelyabinsk at the Remstroydormash plant as an engineer also before moving to Norilsk.

Since 1990, he worked at the Norilsk Mining and Metallurgical Combine as a technician in the economic department of the combine. In 1995 he graduated from the Norilsk Industrial Institute with a degree in economics and management in metallurgy, qualification engineer-economist. In the second half of the 1990s, he became the head of the tax planning department of Norilsk Nickel, replacing Alexander Novak in this position. From 2001 to 2005, he was Chief Accountant of the Polar Division of MMC Norilsk Nickel. From 2005 to 2006, he was the Deputy Director - Head of the Diversified Support Directorate of the Polar Division of Norilsk Nickel. In 2006, he became the CEO of a subsidiary of the holding of Norilsk Providing Complex LLC.

In 2008, following the results of the competition, Teksler was appointed city manager of the city of Norilsk. On 30 June 2009, for personal reasons, he left the post of his own free will.

Since 2009, he was the General Director of the mining and metallurgical concern "Kazakhaltyn".

Since December 2011, he became the Managing Director of the Krasnoyarsk branch of Polyus-Zoloto.

On 20 July 2013, Teksler was appointed Deputy, and since November 18, 2014, First Deputy Minister of Energy (since 2012, the former head of Teksler at Norilsk Nickel, Novak has been the Minister). In the department, he supervised the departments of state energy policy, budget planning and accounting, corporate governance, pricing environment and control and audit work in the fuel and energy complex, was responsible for preparing a consolidated forecast of Russia's socio-economic development in the fuel and energy complex, financial and economic analysis of the activities of organizations Fuel and energy complex and so on. He also participated in the composition of interdepartmental commissions.

On 27 October 2015, by governmental order of Russian Prime Minister, Dmitry Medvedev, Teksler was reprimanded for "improper performance" of his official duties. His foreclosure was lifted on 17 June 2016.

From March 2015 to December 2016, he headed the Board of Directors of PJSC ANK Bashneft. In November 2017, he was involved as a witness in a court hearing in a criminal case against the Minister of Economic Development of Russia Alxey Ulyukayev, associated with the acquisition by Rosneft of a state block of shares in Bashneft.

While working at the Ministry of Economy, he oversaw the transfer of the Korkinsky coal mine of the Chelyabinsk coal basin to the Russian Copper Company, for its reclamation by filling the Tominsky GOK for the extraction and processing of porphyry copper ore with waste. In connection with the massive protests of the city's population against the construction of this mining and processing plant, the issue of its settlement was under the control of the Russian President Vladimir Putin, as well as the issues of air pollution in the city, in particular due to spontaneous combustion of coal seams in the open pit.

Since 2018, he was one of the board of directors of Zarubezhneft.

As the first deputy minister of energy, he was in charge of the transfer by the Chelyabinsk Coal Company of the worked-out Korkinsky coal mine of the Chelyabinsk coal basin to the Russian Copper Company for use as a tailing dump of the Tominsky GOK for the extraction and processing of porphyry copper ore and subsequent reclamation, in making decisions on the coal mine and the construction of the mine was also attended by the Russian Ministry of Energy.

=== Governor of Chelyabinsk Oblast ===
Teksler was originally considered to replace the Governor of the Murmansk Oblast Marina Kovtun, who was to be replaced on 21 March 2019, but on 19 March 2019, by the Decree of the President of Russia, he was appointed Acting Governor of the Chelyabinsk Oblast. In April 2019, he was appointed president of the Chelyabinsk hockey club Traktor.

In April 2019, he announced his intention to run for the post of the Chelyabinsk governor in the elections scheduled for September 8, 2019; on June 5, 2019, he was registered by the regional election committee as a self-nominated candidate.

On Unified Election Day, 8 September 2019, with a result of 69.31% with a voter turnout of 45.14% in the first round of elections for the governor of the Chelyabinsk Oblast, Teksler won the election. His term of office will end in 2024.

He topped the list of the United Russia party in the elections to the Legislative Assembly of the Chelyabinsk Oblast in 2020. Soon after the announcement of his intention to head the list of "United Russia", he officially joined the party.

Since 21 December 2020, he is a Member of the Presidium of the State Council of Russia.

=== Sanctions ===
He was sanctioned by the UK government in 2022 in relation to the Russo-Ukrainian War.

== Family ==
He is married to Irina Nikolayevna Teksler (née- Matyash), who was born in 1978 in Norilsk, led a sports section on Norilsk television ("Channel-7"), after moving to Moscow with her husband, she opened the Tonus- fitness club on Arbat. club".

His son, as of 2020 he is studying at gymnasium number 80 in Chelyabinsk.
