= Vitaly Pashin =

Russian politician

Member of Parliament Vitaly Pashin
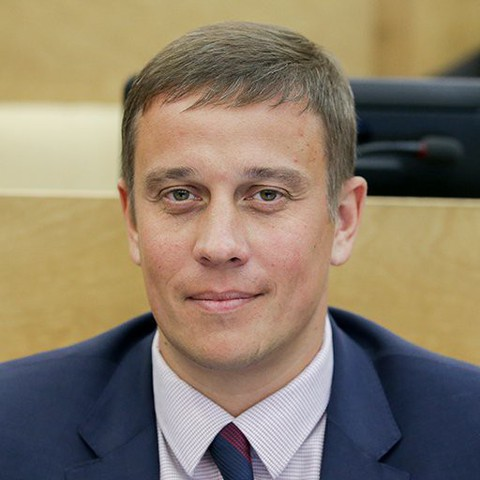
- Vitaly Pashin

Deputy of the State Duma
- In office 18 September 2016 – 12 October 2021
- Constituency: Chelyabinsk Oblast

Member of the State Duma Committee for Security and Anti-Corruption
- In office October 2016 – By 2021

Personal details
- Born: Vitaly Lvovich Pashin; 30 August 1981 (age 45) Sosnovka, Chelyabinsk Oblast, Russian SFSR, Soviet Union
- Citizenship: Russian Federation
- Party: Liberal Democratic Party of Russia
- Education: Chelyabinsk Pedagogical University (2006), Moscow Academy of Law and Management (2011), Russian University of Economics (2014)
- Occupation: Politician

Vitaly Lvovich Pashin (Russian: Виталий Львович Пашин; born 30 August 1981) is a Russian politician. He was a deputy of the 7th State Duma of the Russian Federation between 2016 and 2021.

== Biography ==
=== Education ===
Pashin was born in Sosnovka, Chelyabinsk Oblast. He studied physical education at Chelyabinsk Pedagogical University, graduating in 2006. He advanced to a degree in public administration from the Moscow Academy of Law and Management in 2011, and in 2014 received an MBA from the Russian University of Economics.

=== State Duma of the Russian Federation ===
In 2016, Pashin was elected as a deputy in the State Duma, the lower house of the Federal Assembly of Russia. He was a representative for the Chelyabinsk region. His first day in office was 18 September 2016. He was also a member of the State Duma Committee for Security and Anti-Corruption.

Pashin and fellow LDPR deputy Daniel Shilkov presented a bill in support of animal rights to the State Duma on 1 December 2016. If passed into law, the bill would create a national animal ombudsman to protect the interests of both domestic and wild animals in Russia.
