= Legislative Assembly of Chelyabinsk Oblast =

Regional parliament of Chelyabinsk Oblast, Russia

Legislative Assembly of Chelyabinsk Oblast Законодательное собрание Челябинской области
- 8th legislature

Type
- Type: Unicameral

Leadership
- Chairman: Oleg Gerber, United Russia

Structure
- Seats: 60
- Political groups: United Russia (48) A Just Russia (6); New People (2); LDPR (2); RPPSJ (1) CPRF (1)

Elections
- Last election: 12-14 September 2025
- Next election: 2030

Meeting place
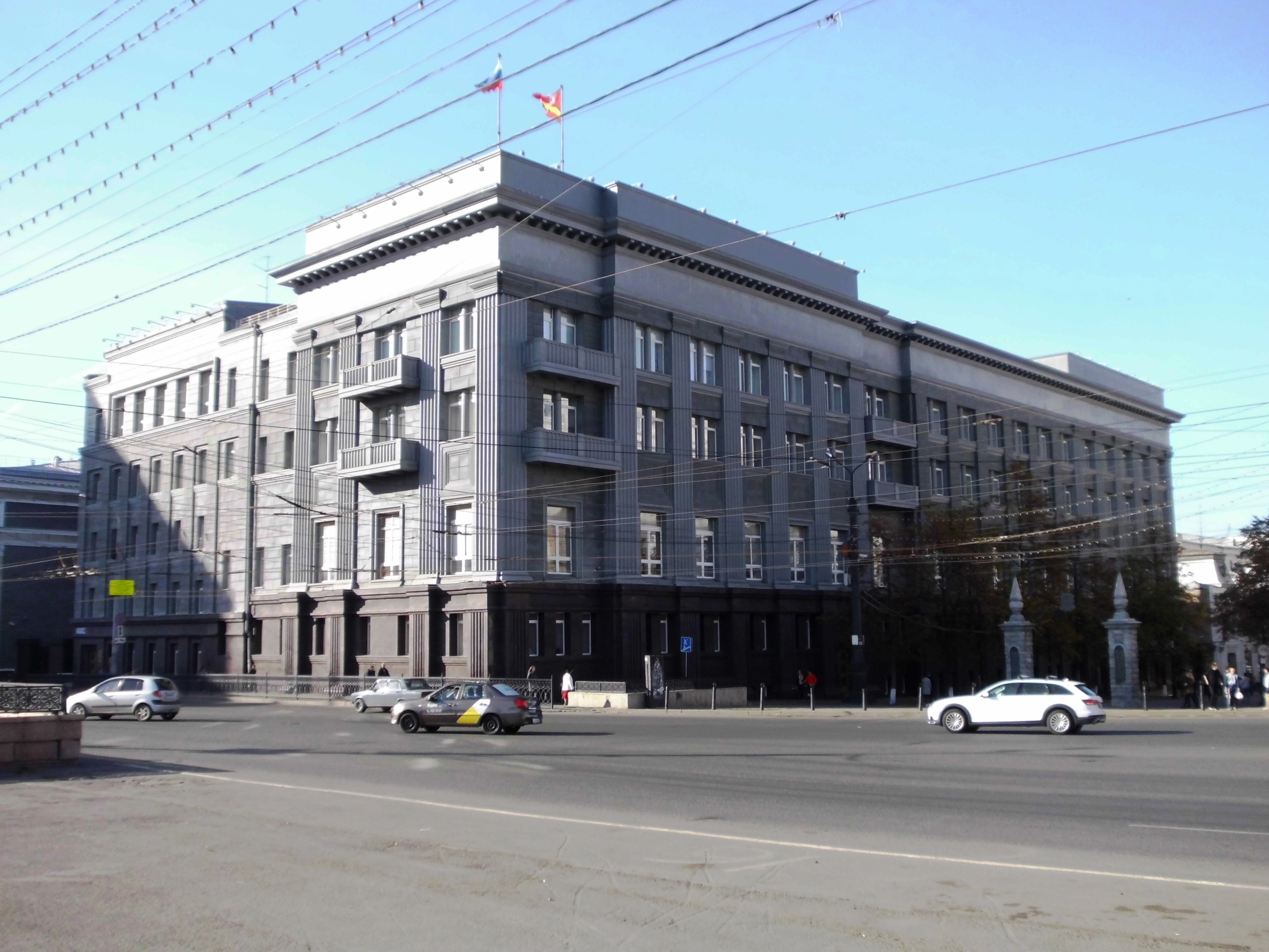
- Ulitsa Kirova, 114, Chelyabinsk

Website
- zs74.ru

The Legislative Assembly of Chelyabinsk Oblast (Russian: Законодательное собрание Челябинской области, romanized: Zakonodatel'noe sobranie Chelyabinskoy oblasti) is the regional parliament of Chelyabinsk Oblast, a federal subject of Russia. A total of 60 deputies are elected for five-year terms.

== Elections ==
=== 2020 ===
Party	%	Seats
United Russia	42.59	43
A Just Russia	14.79	7
Communist Party of the Russian Federation	11.86	4
Liberal Democratic Party of Russia	11.31	3
Russian Party of Pensioners for Social Justice	5.7	2
Green Alternative	5.36	1
For Truth	2.08	0
Party of Growth	1.69	0
Rodina	0.71	0
Registered voters/turnout	33.87	

=== 2025 ===
Party	%	Seats
United Russia	54.48	48
A Just Russia	13.43	6
Liberal Democratic Party of Russia	9.79	2
New People	8.11	2
Communist Party of the Russian Federation	5.94	1
Russian Party of Pensioners for Social Justice	5.69	1
Invalid ballots	2.56	
Registered voters/turnout	39.90	
