= 2013 World Championships in Athletics – Women's heptathlon =

Sports competition

Women's heptathlon at the 2013 World Championships
- Venue: Luzhniki Stadium
- Dates: 12 August; 13 August
- Competitors: 33 from 24 nations
- Winning points: 6586

Medalists
gold medal	Hanna Melnychenko; Ukraine
silver medal	Brianne Theisen-Eaton; Canada
bronze medal	Dafne Schippers; Netherlands

Day 1–1 Video Day 1–2 Video Day 2–1 Video Day 2–2 Video

The women's heptathlon at the 2013 World Championships in Athletics was held at the Luzhniki Stadium Moskva RUSSIA on 12–13 August. The winning margin was 56 points.

== Records ==
Prior to the competition, the records were as follows:

World record	Jackie Joyner-Kersee (USA)	7291	Seoul, South Korea	24 September 1988
Championship record	Jackie Joyner-Kersee (USA)	7128	Rome, Italy	1 September 1987
World leading	Tatyana Chernova (RUS)	6623	Kazan, Russia	8 July 2013
African record	Margaret Simpson (GHA)	6423	Götzis, Austria	29 May 2005
Asian record	Ghada Shouaa (SYR)	6942	Götzis, Austria	26 May 1996
North, Central American and Caribbean record	Jackie Joyner-Kersee (USA)	7291	Seoul, South Korea	24 September 1988
South American record	Lucimara da Silva (BRA)	6160	Barquisimeto, Venezuela	10 June 2012
European record	Carolina Klüft (SWE)	7032	Osaka, Japan	26 August 2007
Oceanian record	Jane Flemming (AUS)	6695	Auckland, New Zealand	28 January 1990

== Qualification standards ==
A result	B result
6100 pts	5950 pts

== Schedule ==
Date	Time	Round
12 August 2013	09:30	100 metres hurdles
12 August 2013	10:35	High jump
12 August 2013	18:45	Shot put
12 August 2013	20:35	200 metres
13 August 2013	09:30	Long jump
13 August 2013	11:10	Javelin throw
13 August 2013	20:10	800 metres

All times are local times (UTC+4)

== Results ==
KEY:	NR	National record	PB	Personal best	SB	Seasonal best

=== 100 metres hurdles ===
Wind: −0.6, −0.4, −0.2, −0.6 m/s.

Rank	Heat	Athlete	Nationality	Result	Points	Notes
1	4	Brianne Theisen-Eaton	Canada	13.17	1099	
2	4	Hanna Melnychenko	Ukraine	13.29	1081	
3	4	Dafne Schippers	Netherlands	13.30	1080	SB
4	4	Antoinette Nana Djimou	France	13.36	1071	SB
5	3	Grit Šadeiko	Estonia	13.40	1065	SB
6	4	Karolina Tymińska	Poland	13.48	1053	
7	4	Katarina Johnson-Thompson	Great Britain & N.I.	13.49	1052	
8	2	Linda Züblin	Switzerland	13.51	1049	PB
8	3	Sharon Day	United States	13.51	1049	PB
10	4	Claudia Rath	Germany	13.55	1043	
11	2	Yasmina Omrani	Algeria	13.57	1040	PB
12	3	Ellen Sprunger	Switzerland	13.68	1024	
13	4	Erica Bougard	United States	13.69	1023	
14	3	Makeba Alcide	Saint Lucia	13.73	1017	
15	2	Kristina Savitskaya	Russia	13.82	1004	SB
16	2	Bettie Wade	United States	13.84	1001	
17	2	Katsiaryna Netsviatayeva	Belarus	13.87	997	
18	1	Wassana Winatho	Thailand	13.88	995	SB
18	3	Yorgelis Rodríguez	Cuba	13.88	995	
18	3	Kira Biesenbach	Germany	13.88	995	
21	4	Laura Ikauniece	Latvia	13.89	994	
22	2	Sofía Yfantídou	Greece	13.93	988	
23	1	Eliška Klučinová	Czech Republic	13.97	983	PB
24	1	Mari Klaup	Estonia	13.99	980	PB
25	3	Sofia Linde	Sweden	14.02	976	
26	1	Györgyi Zsivoczky-Farkas	Hungary	14.09	966	
27	2	Yana Maksimava	Belarus	14.11	963	
28	2	Nafissatou Thiam	Belgium	14.13	960	
29	1	Ida Marcussen	Norway	14.27	941	
30	1	Julia Mächtig	Germany	14.38	925	
31	1	Aleksandra Butvina	Russia	14.52	906	
32	1	Irina Karpova	Kazakhstan	14.54	903	
33	3	Nadine Broersen	Netherlands	14.84	863	

=== High jump ===
The high jump was started at 09:30.

Rank	Group	Athlete	Nationality	Result	Points	Notes	Overall	Overall Rank
1	A	Nafissatou Thiam	Belgium	1.92	1132	PB	2092	3
2	A	Nadine Broersen	Netherlands	1.89	1093		1956	17
3	A	Yorgelis Rodríguez	Cuba	1.86	1054	PB	2049	7
4	A	Eliška Klučinová	Czech Republic	1.86	1054	PB	2037	8
5	A	Hanna Melnychenko	Ukraine	1.86	1054	PB	2135	1
6	A	Brianne Theisen-Eaton	Canada	1.83	1016		2115	2
7	A	Katarina Johnson-Thompson	Great Britain & N.I.	1.83	1016		2068	4
8	A	Sharon Day	United States	1.83	1016		2065	5
9	B	Claudia Rath	Germany	1.83	1016	PB	2059	6
10	A	Bettie Wade	United States	1.80	978		1979	15
11	A	Erica Bougard	United States	1.80	978		2001	12
12	A	Makeba Alcide	Saint Lucia	1.80	978		1995	13
13	A	Györgyi Zsivoczky-Farkas	Hungary	1.80	978		1944	19
13	B	Laura Ikauniece	Latvia	1.80	978	SB	1972	16
15	B	Yasmina Omrani	Algeria	1.77	941	SB	1981	14
16	B	Kristina Savitskaya	Russia	1.77	941	SB	1945	18
17	B	Grit Šadeiko	Estonia	1.77	941		2006	11
18	B	Dafne Schippers	Netherlands	1.77	941	SB	2021	9
19	B	Antoinette Nana Djimou	France	1.77	941	SB	2012	10
20	A	Yana Maksimava	Belarus	1.74	903		1866	24
21	A	Mari Klaup	Estonia	1.74	903		1883	22
22	A	Sofia Linde	Sweden	1.74	903		1879	23
22	A	Aleksandra Butvina	Russia	1.74	903		1809	29
24	B	Katsiaryna Netsviatayeva	Belarus	1.74	903	SB	1900	20
25	B	Kira Biesenbach	Germany	1.71	867		1862	25
26	B	Julia Mächtig	Germany	1.71	867		1792	31
27	B	Ida Marcussen	Norway	1.71	867	SB	1808	30
28	A	Wassana Winatho	Thailand	1.68	830		1825	28
29	B	Ellen Sprunger	Switzerland	1.68	830		1854	26
29	B	Karolina Tymińska	Poland	1.68	830		1883	21
31	B	Linda Züblin	Switzerland	1.65	795	SB	1844	27
32	B	Sofía Yfantídou	Greece	1.65	795		1783	32
33	B	Irina Karpova	Kazakhstan	1.65	795		1698	33

=== Shot put ===
The shot put was held at 18:45.

Rank	Group	Athlete	Nationality	Result	Points	Notes	Overall	Overall Rank
1	A	Julia Mächtig	Germany	15.48	893		2685	16
2	A	Antoinette Nana Djimou	France	14.54	830		2842	6
3	A	Yana Maksimava	Belarus	14.27	812		2678	18
4	A	Eliška Klučinová	Czech Republic	14.19	807	SB	2844	5
5	A	Katsiaryna Netsviatayeva	Belarus	14.17	805		2705	13
6	A	Aleksandra Butvina	Russia	14.16	805		2614	25
7	A	Hanna Melnychenko	Ukraine	13.85	784		2919	1
8	A	Sofia Linde	Sweden	13.80	781		2660	19
9	A	Sharon Day	United States	14.35	817		2882	2
10	A	Kristina Savitskaya	Russia	13.75	777		2722	11
11	A	Karolina Tymińska	Poland	13.74	777		2660	20
12	A	Nafissatou Thiam	Belgium	13.71	775		2867	3
13	A	Nadine Broersen	Netherlands	13.46	758		2714	12
14	A	Yasmina Omrani	Algeria	13.32	749		2730	10
15	A	Györgyi Zsivoczky-Farkas	Hungary	13.13	736		2680	17
16	B	Brianne Theisen-Eaton	Canada	13.07	732		2847	4
17	A	Dafne Schippers	Netherlands	12.91	721		2742	9
18	B	Kira Biesenbach	Germany	12.91	721		2583	27
19	B	Sofía Yfantídou	Greece	12.89	720		2503	30
20	B	Claudia Rath	Germany	12.88	719		2778	7
21	B	Ellen Sprunger	Switzerland	12.86	718		2572	28
22	B	Mari Klaup	Estonia	12.85	717	PB	2600	26
23	B	Yorgelis Rodríguez	Cuba	12.83	716		2765	8
24	A	Bettie Wade	United States	12.79	713		2692	15
25	B	Linda Züblin	Switzerland	12.51	695		2539	29
26	B	Laura Ikauniece	Latvia	12.36	685		2657	21
27	B	Ida Marcussen	Norway	12.31	682		2490	31
28	B	Irina Karpova	Kazakhstan	11.92	656	SB	2354	33
29	B	Wassana Winatho	Thailand	11.86	652		2477	32
30	B	Makeba Alcide	Saint Lucia	11.82	649		2644	22
31	B	Katarina Johnson-Thompson	Great Britain & N.I.	11.52	629		2697	14
32	B	Grit Šadeiko	Estonia	11.49	627		2633	23
33	B	Erica Bougard	United States	11.27	613	PB	2614	24

=== 200 metres ===
Wind:
Heat 1: −0.2, Heat 2: −0.1, Heat 3: −0.2, Heat 4: 0.0, Heat 5: 0.0 m/s.

Rank	Heat	Athlete	Nationality	Result	Points	Notes	Overall	Overall Rank
1	5	Dafne Schippers	Netherlands	22.84	1095	SB	3837	2
2	5	Katarina Johnson-Thompson	Great Britain & N.I.	23.37	1042	PB	3739	5
3	5	Ellen Sprunger	Switzerland	23.39	1040	PB	3612	12
4	5	Hanna Melnychenko	Ukraine	23.87	993		3912	1
5	5	Karolina Tymińska	Poland	24.13	968		3628	11
6	4	Brianne Theisen-Eaton	Canada	24.18	963		3810	4
7	4	Claudia Rath	Germany	24.27	955		3733	7
8	4	Sharon Day	United States	24.28	954		3836	3
9	4	Grit Šadeiko	Estonia	24.46	937		3570	16
10	5	Erica Bougard	United States	24.59	925		3539	19
11	4	Laura Ikauniece	Latvia	24.73	912		3569	16
12	2	Yasmina Omrani	Algeria	24.75	910	SB	3640	10
13	4	Yorgelis Rodríguez	Cuba	24.77	908		3673	9
14	3	Bettie Wade	United States	24.87	899		3591	14
15	3	Eliška Klučinová	Czech Republic	24.91	895		3739	5
16	2	Wassana Winatho	Thailand	24.94	892	SB	3369	28
17	3	Antoinette Nana Djimou	France	24.95	891		3733	7
18	4	Makeba Alcide	Saint Lucia	24.96	890		3534	20
19	2	Nadine Broersen	Netherlands	25.01	886	PB	3600	13
19	2	Linda Züblin	Switzerland	25.01	886	SB	3425	27
21	3	Katsiaryna Netsviatayeva	Belarus	25.09	879		3584	15
22	2	Kristina Savitskaya	Russia	25.43	848		3570	16
23	3	Julia Mächtig	Germany	25.45	846		3531	21
24	1	Mari Klaup	Estonia	25.54	838	PB	3438	26
25	1	Ida Marcussen	Norway	25.59	833		3323	29
26	3	Nafissatou Thiam	Belgium	25.61	832		3699	8
27	2	Sofia Linde	Sweden	25.64	829		3489	24
28	1	Györgyi Zsivoczky-Farkas	Hungary	25.66	827		3507	22
29	3	Aleksandra Butvina	Russia	25.68	825		3439	24
30	1	Yana Maksimava	Belarus	25.77	817		3495	23
31	1	Sofía Yfantídou	Greece	25.94	802	SB	3305	30
32	1	Irina Karpova	Kazakhstan	26.50	754		3108	31
	5	Kira Biesenbach	Germany	DNS	0		DNF	–

=== Long jump ===
The long jump was held at 07:30.

Rank	Group	Athlete	Nationality	Result	Points	Notes	Overall	Overall Rank
1	A	Claudia Rath	Germany	6.67	1062	PB	4795	3
2	A	Katarina Johnson-Thompson	Great Britain & N.I.	6.56	1027	PB	4766	5
3	A	Hanna Melnychenko	Ukraine	6.49	1004	SB	4916	1
4	A	Brianne Theisen-Eaton	Canada	6.37	965	PB	4775	4
5	A	Dafne Schippers	Netherlands	6.35	959		4796	2
6	A	Karolina Tymińska	Poland	6.32	949		4577	9
7	A	Linda Züblin	Switzerland	6.23	921	SB	4346	21
8	B	Ellen Sprunger	Switzerland	6.16	899	PB	4511	12
9	A	Györgyi Zsivoczky-Farkas	Hungary	6.16	899		4406	18
10	A	Nadine Broersen	Netherlands	6.13	890		4490	13
11	A	Eliška Klučinová	Czech Republic	6.12	887		4626	6
12	B	Kristina Savitskaya	Russia	6.11	883		4453	15
13	A	Nafissatou Thiam	Belgium	6.11	883		4582	8
14	A	Grit Šadeiko	Estonia	6.11	883		4453	14
15	B	Ida Marcussen	Norway	6.08	874		4197	29
16	A	Julia Mächtig	Germany	6.07	871		4402	19
17	A	Erica Bougard	United States	6.01	853		4392	20
18	B	Yorgelis Rodríguez	Cuba	6.00	850	SB	4523	11
19	A	Antoinette Nana Djimou	France	5.97	840		4573	10
20	A	Laura Ikauniece	Latvia	5.96	837		4406	17
21	B	Sofía Yfantídou	Greece	5.85	804		4109	31
22	B	Yasmina Omrani	Algeria	5.82	795		4435	16
23	B	Aleksandra Butvina	Russia	5.81	792		4231	27
24	B	Sofia Linde	Sweden	5.80	789		4278	24
25	B	Sharon Day	United States	5.79	786		4622	7
26	B	Mari Klaup	Estonia	5.77	780		4218	28
27	B	Yana Maksimava	Belarus	5.77	780		4275	25
28	B	Wassana Winatho	Thailand	5.76	777		4146	30
29	B	Katsiaryna Netsviatayeva	Belarus	5.67	750		4334	22
30	B	Makeba Alcide	Saint Lucia	5.62	735		4269	26
31	B	Bettie Wade	United States	5.61	732		4323	23
32	B	Irina Karpova	Kazakhstan	5.54	712	SB	3820	32

=== Javelin throw ===
The javelin throw was held at 09:10.

Rank	Group	Athlete	Nationality	Result	Points	Notes	Overall	Overall Rank
1	A	Sofía Yfantídou	Greece	53.66	931		5040	23
2	A	Antoinette Nana Djimou	France	52.47	908		5481	4
3	A	Laura Ikauniece	Latvia	50.75	875	SB	5281	11
4	A	Mari Klaup	Estonia	50.15	863	PB	5081	20
5	A	Linda Züblin	Switzerland	49.64	853	SB	5199	14
6	A	Ida Marcussen	Norway	49.26	846		5043	22
7	A	Nadine Broersen	Netherlands	47.48	811		5301	10
8	A	Sharon Day	United States	47.17	805		5427	7
9	A	Eliška Klučinová	Czech Republic	45.76	778		5404	8
10	A	Brianne Theisen-Eaton	Canada	45.64	776	SB	5551	2
11	A	Györgyi Zsivoczky-Farkas	Hungary	45.43	772		5178	16
12	A	Yana Maksimava	Belarus	45.41	771	PB	5046	21
13	A	Julia Mächtig	Germany	44.74	758		5160	17
14	A	Yorgelis Rodríguez	Cuba	44.66	757		5280	12
15	A	Nafissatou Thiam	Belgium	43.64	737		5319	9
16	B	Hanna Melnychenko	Ukraine	41.87	703	SB	5619	1
17	B	Wassana Winatho	Thailand	41.74	701	PB	4847	30
18	B	Dafne Schippers	Netherlands	41.47	696	PB	5492	3
19	B	Katarina Johnson-Thompson	Great Britain & N.I.	40.86	684	PB	5450	5
20	B	Karolina Tymińska	Poland	40.61	679		5256	13
21	B	Ellen Sprunger	Switzerland	40.41	675		5186	15
22	B	Aleksandra Butvina	Russia	40.30	673		4904	28
23	B	Sofia Linde	Sweden	40.13	670		4948	26
24	B	Yasmina Omrani	Algeria	39.26	653		5088	18
25	B	Claudia Rath	Germany	39.04	649		5444	6
26	B	Katsiaryna Netsviatayeva	Belarus	38.60	640		4974	24
27	B	Bettie Wade	United States	38.23	633		4956	25
28	A	Kristina Savitskaya	Russia	38.21	633		5086	19
29	B	Makeba Alcide	Saint Lucia	37.09	612	PB	4881	29
30	B	Erica Bougard	United States	32.62	526		4918	27
	A	Grit Šadeiko	Estonia			DNS		
	B	Irina Karpova	Kazakhstan			DNS		
		Kira Biesenbach	Germany			DNS		

=== 800 metres ===
The 800 metres were held at 20.10.

Rank	Heat	Athlete	Nationality	Result	Points	Notes
1	3	Claudia Rath	Germany	2:06.43	1018	PB
2	2	Karolina Tymińska	Poland	2:06.64	1014	SB
3	3	Katarina Johnson-Thompson	Great Britain & N.I.	2:07.64	999	PB
4	3	Dafne Schippers	Netherlands	2:08.62	985	PB
5	3	Sharon Day	United States	2:08.94	980	PB
6	3	Brianne Theisen-Eaton	Canada	2:09.03	979	PB
7	3	Hanna Melnychenko	Ukraine	2:09.85	967	PB
8	1	Ida Marcussen	Norway	2:10.83	953	
9	2	Yana Maksimava	Belarus	2:11.96	936	SB
10	3	Eliška Klučinová	Czech Republic	2:12.50	928	PB
11	1	Katsiaryna Netsviatayeva	Belarus	2:12.54	928	
12	3	Nadine Broersen	Netherlands	2:12.89	923	PB
13	1	Erica Bougard	United States	2:13.72	911	
14	1	Aleksandra Butvina	Russia	2:14.14	905	
15	2	Yasmina Omrani	Algeria	2:14.81	895	SB
16	2	Ellen Sprunger	Switzerland	2:14.83	895	SB
17	2	Györgyi Zsivoczky-Farkas	Hungary	2:15.28	889	SB
18	2	Laura Ikauniece	Latvia	2:16.05	878	
19	1	Sofia Linde	Sweden	2:16.34	874	PB
20	1	Makeba Alcide	Saint Lucia	2:16.65	870	
21	2	Yorgelis Rodríguez	Cuba	2:16.74	868	PB
22	2	Julia Mächtig	Germany	2:17.28	861	
23	2	Linda Züblin	Switzerland	2:17.50	858	
24	1	Sofía Yfantídou	Greece	2:17.74	854	SB
25	3	Antoinette Nana Djimou	France	2:18.44	845	
26	2	Mari Klaup	Estonia	2:18.57	843	SB
27	1	Wassana Winatho	Thailand	2:19.97	824	
28	1	Bettie Wade	United States	2:20.87	812	
29	3	Nafissatou Thiam	Belgium	2:25.43	751	
		Kristina Savitskaya	Russia			DNS
		Grit Šadeiko	Estonia			DNS
		Irina Karpova	Kazakhstan			DNS
		Kira Biesenbach	Germany			DNS

=== Final standings ===
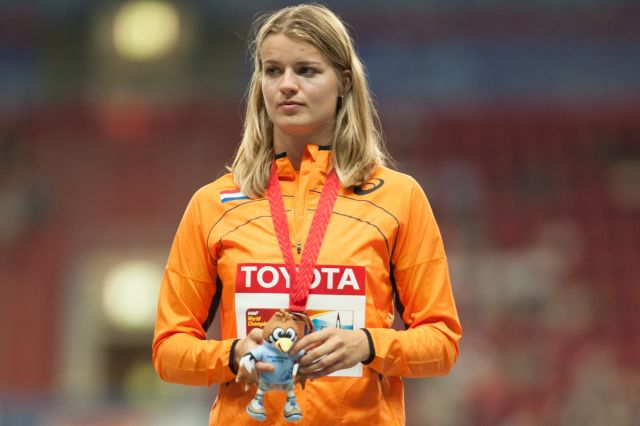
Bronze medalist Dafne Schippers from the Netherlands.

Rank	Athlete	Nationality	100 h	HJ	SP	200	LJ	JT	800	Total	Note
1st place, gold medalist(s)	Hanna Melnychenko	Ukraine	1081	1054	784	993	1004	703	967	6586	PB
2nd place, silver medalist(s)	Brianne Theisen-Eaton	Canada	1099	1016	732	963	965	776	979	6530	PB
3rd place, bronze medalist(s)	Dafne Schippers	Netherlands	1080	941	721	1095	959	696	985	6477	NR
4	Claudia Rath	Germany	1043	1016	719	955	1062	649	1018	6462	PB
5	Katarina Johnson-Thompson	Great Britain & N.I.	1052	1016	629	1042	1027	684	999	6449	PB
6	Sharon Day	United States	1049	1016	817	954	786	805	980	6407	
7	Eliška Klučinová	Czech Republic	983	1054	807	895	887	778	928	6332	NR
8	Antoinette Nana Djimou	France	1071	941	830	891	840	908	845	6326	SB
9	Karolina Tymińska	Poland	1053	830	777	968	949	679	1014	6270	
10	Nadine Broersen	Netherlands	863	1093	758	886	890	811	923	6224	
11	Laura Ikauniece	Latvia	994	978	685	912	837	875	878	6159	
12	Yorgelis Rodríguez	Cuba	995	1054	716	908	850	757	868	6148	
13	Ellen Sprunger	Switzerland	1024	830	718	1040	899	675	895	6081	SB
14	Nafissatou Thiam	Belgium	960	1132	775	832	883	737	751	6070	
15	Györgyi Zsivoczky-Farkas	Hungary	966	978	736	827	899	772	889	6067	
16	Linda Züblin	Switzerland	1049	795	695	886	921	853	858	6057	PB
17	Julia Mächtig	Germany	925	867	893	846	871	758	861	6021	
18	Ida Marcussen	Norway	941	867	682	833	874	846	953	5996	
19	Yasmina Omrani	Algeria	1040	941	749	910	795	653	895	5983	PB
20	Yana Maksimava	Belarus	963	903	812	817	780	771	936	5982	
21	Mari Klaup	Estonia	980	903	717	838	780	863	843	5924	
22	Katsiaryna Netsviatayeva	Belarus	997	903	805	879	750	640	928	5902	
23	Sofía Yfantídou	Greece	988	795	720	802	804	931	854	5894	SB
24	Erica Bougard	United States	1023	978	613	925	853	526	911	5829	
25	Sofia Linde	Sweden	976	903	781	829	789	670	874	5822	
26	Aleksandra Butvina	Russia	906	903	805	825	792	673	905	5809	
27	Bettie Wade	United States	1001	978	713	899	732	633	812	5768	
28	Makeba Alcide	Saint Lucia	1017	978	649	890	735	612	870	5751	
29	Wassana Winatho	Thailand	995	830	652	892	777	701	824	5671	
	Grit Šadeiko	Estonia	1065	941	627	937	883	DNS	DNS	—N/a	DNF
	Kristina Savitskaya	Russia	1004	941	777	848	883	633	DNS	—N/a	DNF
	Kira Biesenbach	Germany	995	867	721	DNS	DNS	DNS	DNS	—N/a	DNF
	Irina Karpova	Kazakhstan	903	795	656	754	712	DNS	DNS	—N/a	DNF
