= 2013 European Athletics Indoor Championships – Women's pentathlon =

The women's pentathlon event at the 2013 European Athletics Indoor Championships was held at March 1, 2013.

== Records ==
Standing records prior to the 2013 European Athletics Indoor Championships
World record	Natallia Dobrynska (UKR)	5013	Istanbul, Turkey	9 March 2012
European record	Natallia Dobrynska (UKR)	5013	Istanbul, Turkey	9 March 2012
Championship record	Carolina Klüft (SWE)	4948	Madrid, Spain	5 March 2005
World Leading	Ekaterina Bolshova (RUS)	4851	Volgograd, Russia	9 February 2013
European Leading	Ekaterina Bolshova (RUS)	4851	Volgograd, Russia	9 February 2013

== Results ==
=== 60 metres hurdles ===
Rank	Heat	Lane	Athlete	Nationality	Time	Notes	Points
1	2	3	Ida Antoinette Nana Djimou	France	8.12	SB	1102
2	2	6	Hanna Melnychenko	Ukraine	8.27	PB	1068
3	2	7	Nadine Broersen	Netherlands	8.32	PB	1057
4	2	4	Ellen Sprunger	Switzerland	8.32	PB	1057
5	2	5	Sofia Linde	Sweden	8.36	PB	1048
6	1	4	Remona Fransen	Netherlands	8.43	PB	1032
7	1	6	Ellinore Hallin	Sweden	8.43	PB	1032
8	2	8	Beatrice Puiu	Romania	8.59		997
9	2	1	Ekaterina Bolshova	Russia	8.61		993
10	1	3	Nafissatou Thiam	Belgium	8.63	PB	989
11	1	7	Yana Maksimava	Belarus	8.63		989
12	1	5	Katsiaryna Netsviatayeva	Belarus	8.65		984
13	2	2	Laura Ikauniece	Latvia	8.67	SB	980
14	1	2	Alina Fyodorova	Ukraine	8.79		954
15	1	8	Julia Mächtig	Germany	8.95	SB	920

=== High jump ===
Rank	Athlete	Nationality	1.60	1.63	1.66	1.69	1.72	1.75	1.78	1.81	1.84	1.87	1.90	1.93	Result	Points	Notes	Total
1	Yana Maksimava	Belarus	–	–	–	–	–	–	o	o	o	xo	xxo	xxx	1.90	1106	=PB	2095
2	Nafissatou Thiam	Belgium	–	–	–	–	o	o	o	o	xo	xxo	xxx		1.87	1067	=PB	2056
3	Nadine Broersen	Netherlands	–	–	–	–	o	o	o	xo	o	xxx			1.84	1029	SB	2086
4	Remona Fransen	Netherlands	–	–	–	o	o	o	o	o	xxx				1.81	991	SB	2023
5	Hanna Melnychenko	Ukraine	–	–	–	o	o	o	o	xxo	xxx				1.81	991	SB	2059
6	Sofia Linde	Sweden	–	o	o	o	xo	o	o	xxx					1.78	953	PB	2001
7	Alina Fyodorova	Ukraine	–	–	o	xo	o	o	xo	xxx					1.78	953		1907
8	Ekaterina Bolshova	Russia	–	–	–	–	o	xo	xxo	xxx					1.78	953		1946
9	Laura Ikauniece	Latvia	–	–	–	–	–	o	xxx						1.75	916	SB	1896
10	Julia Mächtig	Germany	–	–	o	o	o	xo	xxx						1.75	916	PB	1836
11	Ida Antoinette Nana Djimou	France	–	–	o	–	xo	xo	xxx						1.75	916	SB	2018
12	Ellinore Hallin	Sweden	o	o	o	o	o	xxx							1.72	879	PB	1911
12	Beatrice Puiu	Romania	o	o	o	o	o	xxx							1.72	879		1876
14	Ellen Sprunger	Switzerland	o	o	xxo	xo	xxx								1.69	842		1899
15	Katsiaryna Netsviatayeva	Belarus	o	o	o	xxo	xxx								1.69	842	PB	1826

=== Shot put ===
Rank	Athlete	Nationality	#1	#2	#3	Result	Notes	Points	Total
1	Julia Mächtig	Germany	15.97	x	15.42	15.97	PB	926	2762
2	Ida Antoinette Nana Djimou	France	13.70	14.75	15.35	15.35		884	2902
3	Yana Maksimava	Belarus	13.84	x	14.65	14.65	SB	837	2932
4	Alina Fyodorova	Ukraine	14.47	14.62	14.36	14.62		835	2742
5	Sofia Linde	Sweden	11.70	12.33	14.14	14.14	PB	803	2804
6	Nafissatou Thiam	Belgium	13.34	13.88	12.81	13.88		786	2842
7	Hanna Melnychenko	Ukraine	13.57	13.82	x	13.82	SB	782	2841
8	Beatrice Puiu	Romania	13.69	x	13.74	13.74	PB	777	2653
9	Ellinore Hallin	Sweden	x	13.45	13.71	13.71	PB	775	2686
10	Remona Fransen	Netherlands	13.42	13.23	x	13.42	SB	755	2778
11	Katsiaryna Netsviatayeva	Belarus	13.33	x	x	13.33		749	2575
12	Nadine Broersen	Netherlands	13.16	13.07	x	13.16	SB	738	2824
13	Ekaterina Bolshova	Russia	12.00	—	—	12.00		661	2607
14	Ellen Sprunger	Switzerland	11.52	11.91	11.87	11.91		655	2554
15	Laura Ikauniece	Latvia	11.34	11.91	11.78	11.91	PB	655	2551

=== Long jump ===
Rank	Athlete	Nationality	#1	#2	#3	Result	Notes	Points	Total
1	Ida Antoinette Nana Djimou	France	6.10	6.25	6.32	6.32	SB	949	3851
2	Remona Fransen	Netherlands	x	6.10	6.29	6.29	PB	940	3718
3	Beatrice Puiu	Romania	5.83	x	6.19	6.19	PB	908	3561
4	Nafissatou Thiam	Belgium	6.06	6.17	6.02	6.17		902	3744
5	Hanna Melnychenko	Ukraine	5.44	6.17	x	6.17		902	3743
6	Sofia Linde	Sweden	5.70	6.12	x	6.12	PB	887	3691
7	Nadine Broersen	Netherlands	5.78	x	6.11	6.11	PB	883	3707
8	Alina Fyodorova	Ukraine	5.99	x	6.03	6.03		859	3601
9	Julia Mächtig	Germany	5.54	5.98	x	5.98	SB	843	3605
10	Ellinore Hallin	Sweden	x	5.97	5.73	5.97	PB	840	3526
11	Yana Maksimava	Belarus	5.94	x	5.81	5.94	SB	831	3763
12	Laura Ikauniece	Latvia	5.92	5.84	5.80	5.92	SB	825	3376
13	Ellen Sprunger	Switzerland	5.75	4.48	-	5.75		774	3325
14	Katsiaryna Netsviatayeva	Belarus	x	5.47	5.55	5.55		715	3290
	Ekaterina Bolshova	Russia				DNS	0		DNF

=== 800 metres ===
Rank	Heat	Lane	Athlete	Nationality	Time	Notes	Points
1	2	4	Yana Maksimava	Belarus	2:14.84		895
2	2	2	Hanna Melnychenko	Ukraine	2:17.01	SB	865
3	1	5	Julia Mächtig	Germany	2:17.49	PB	858
4	2	1	Remona Fransen	Netherlands	2:17.88	SB	853
5	1	1	Laura Ikauniece	Latvia	2:18.24	SB	848
6	1	2	Ellinore Hallin	Sweden	2:18.37	PB	846
7	2	6	Sofia Linde	Sweden	2:18.77	PB	840
8	1	4	Alina Fyodorova	Ukraine	2:20.36		819
9	2	5	Ida Antoinette Nana Djimou	France	2:20.62	SB	815
10	1	6	Katsiaryna Netsviatayeva	Belarus	2:21.59		802
11	2	3	Nafissatou Thiam	Belgium	2:25.64		749
	1	3	Beatrice Puiu	Romania	DQ	R 163.3b	0
	2	1	Nadine Broersen	Netherlands	DQ	R 163.3b	0
	1	6	Ellen Sprunger	Switzerland	DNS		

== Final standings ==
Rank	Athlete	Nationality	#Points	Note
1st place, gold medalist(s)	Ida Antoinette Nana Djimou	France	4666	
2nd place, silver medalist(s)	Yana Maksimava	Belarus	4658	PB
3rd place, bronze medalist(s)	Hanna Melnychenko	Ukraine	4604	
4	Remona Fransen	Netherlands	4571	SB
5	Sofia Linde	Sweden	4531	PB
6	Nafissatou Thiam	Belgium	4493	
7	Julia Mächtig	Germany	4463	SB
8	Alina Fyodorova	Ukraine	4420	
9	Ellinore Hallin	Sweden	4372	PB
10	Laura Ikauniece	Latvia	4224	
11	Katsiaryna Netsviatayeva	Belarus	4092	
12	Nadine Broersen	Netherlands	3707	
13	Beatrice Puiu	Romania	3561	
	Ellen Sprunger	Switzerland	DNF	
	Ekaterina Bolshova	Russia	DNF	
