= Athletics at the 2011 Summer Universiade – Women's heptathlon =

The women's heptathlon event at the 2011 Summer Universiade was held on 19–20 August.

== Medalists ==
Gold	Silver	Bronze
Olga Kurban; Russia	Viktorija Žemaitytė; Lithuania	Kateřina Cachová; Czech Republic

== Results ==
=== 100 metres hurdles ===
Wind:
Heat 1: +1.8 m/s, Heat 2: -0.3 m/s, Heat 3: +0.1 m/s

Rank	Heat	Name	Nationality	Time	Points	Notes
1	3	Natasha Miller	Canada	13.64	1030	PB
2	3	Grit Šadeiko	Estonia	13.64	1030	
3	2	Olga Kurban	Russia	13.84	1001	SB
4	3	Uhunoma Osazuwa	Nigeria	13.92	990	
5	3	Ellen Sprunger	Switzerland	13.96	984	
6	3	Jennifer Cotten	Canada	13.97	983	
7	1	Tilia Udelhoven	Germany	14.05	971	PB
8	2	Estefania Fortes	Spain	14.06	970	SB
9	3	Blandine Maisonnier	France	14.08	967	
10	3	Kateřina Cachová	Czech Republic	14.16	956	
11	3	Janet Lawless	South Africa	14.23	946	
12	2	Lene Myrmel	Norway	14.25	943	
13	2	Yana Maksimava	Belarus	14.31	935	
14	1	Yu Xiaoxuan	China	14.34	931	PB
15	1	Viktorija Žemaitytė	Lithuania	14.35	929	
16	2	Inna Akhozova	Ukraine	14.37	927	
17	3	Wanetta Kirby	United States Virgin Islands	14.42	920	
18	2	Sarah Cowley	New Zealand	14.45	916	
19	2	Yin Li	China	14.49	910	
20	1	Macarena Reyes	Chile	14.52	906	
21	1	Aleksandra Butvina	Russia	14.59	897	
22	1	Nana Blakime	Togo	15.34	797	
23	1	Ruth Morales	Guatemala	17.78	511	
	2	Bárbara Hernando	Spain	DNF	0	
	1	Györgyi Farkas	Hungary	DNS	0	

=== High jump ===
Rank	Group	Athlete	Nationality	1.44	1.47	1.50	1.53	1.56	1.59	1.62	1.65	1.68	1.71	1.74	1.77	1.80	1.83	1.86	1.89	Result	Points	Notes	Overall
1	A	Viktorija Žemaitytė	Lithuania	–	–	–	–	–	–	o	–	o	–	o	o	o	xo	xxo	xxx	1.86	1054	=PB	1983
2	A	Blandine Maisonnier	France	–	–	–	–	–	–	–	o	o	o	o	o	xo	xxo	xxx		1.83	1016	PB	1983
3	A	Olga Kurban	Russia	–	–	–	–	–	–	–	–	o	o	xo	xo	o	xxx			1.80	978	SB	1979
4	A	Kateřina Cachová	Czech Republic	–	–	–	–	–	–	–	–	o	o	xo	xo	o	xxx			1.80	978		1934
5	A	Yana Maksimava	Belarus	–	–	–	–	–	–	–	–	o	o	o	o	xo	xxx			1.80	978		1913
6	A	Uhunoma Osazuwa	Nigeria	–	–	–	–	–	–	–	o	o	o	o	xo	xxo	xxx			1.80	978	SB	1968
7	A	Sarah Cowley	New Zealand	–	–	–	–	–	–	–	–	o	o	o	xo	xxx				1.77	941		1857
8	A	Grit Šadeiko	Estonia	–	–	–	–	–	–	o	o	xo	o	o	xxx					1.74	903		1933
8	B	Inna Akhozova	Ukraine	–	–	–	–	o	o	o	o	o	xo	o	xxx					1.74	903	SB	1830
10	A	Aleksandra Butvina	Russia	–	–	–	–	–	–	o	xo	o	o	xo	xxx					1.74	903	=SB	1800
11	A	Natasha Miller	Canada	–	–	–	–	–	–	–	o	o	o	xxo	xxx					1.74	903		1933
12	A	Janet Lawless	South Africa	–	–	–	–	–	o	o	o	o	xxx							1.68	830		1776
13	B	Jennifer Cotten	Canada	–	–	–	–	–	o	o	xo	o	xxx							1.68	830		1813
13	B	Yu Xiaoxuan	China	–	–	–	–	–	–	xo	o	o	xxx							1.68	830		1761
15	A	Tilia Udelhoven	Germany	–	–	–	–	o	o	xo	xo	xo	xxx							1.68	830		1801
16	B	Wanetta Kirby	United States Virgin Islands	–	–	–	–	–	–	o	o	xxx								1.65	795		1715
17	B	Bárbara Hernando	Spain	–	–	–	–	–	xo	o	xxo	xxx								1.65	795		795
18	B	Lene Myrmel	Norway	–	–	o	–	o	o	o	xxx									1.62	759	SB	1702
19	B	Ellen Sprunger	Switzerland	–	–	–	–	–	o	xxx										1.59	724		1708
20	B	Yin Li	China	–	–	o	–	xxo	o	xxx										1.59	724		1634
21	B	Macarena Reyes	Chile	–	–	–	–	xxo	xo	xxx										1.59	724		1630
22	B	Estefania Fortes	Spain	o	o	o	xxo	o	xxx											1.56	689		1659
23	B	Nana Blakime	Togo	o	o	o	xxo	xxo	xxx											1.56	689		1486
24	B	Ruth Morales	Guatemala	o	o	o	o	xxx												1.53	655		1166

=== Shot put ===
Rank	Group	Athlete	Nationality	#1	#2	#3	Result	Points	Notes	Overall
1	A	Viktorija Žemaitytė	Lithuania	13.86	x	13.43	13.86	785		2768
2	A	Olga Kurban	Russia	13.23	13.69	x	13.69	773	SB	2752
3	A	Yana Maksimava	Belarus	12.98	13.62	13.30	13.62	769	SB	2682
4	A	Aleksandra Butvina	Russia	12.01	13.42	12.99	13.42	755		2555
5	A	Estefania Fortes	Spain	11.74	12.81	12.13	12.81	715	SB	2374
6	A	Inna Akhozova	Ukraine	12.56	12.44	12.11	12.56	698	SB	2528
7	A	Ellen Sprunger	Switzerland	12.15	11.44	x	12.15	671	=PB	2379
8	A	Sarah Cowley	New Zealand	11.47	11.91	11.15	11.91	655		2512
9	A	Grit Šadeiko	Estonia	10.83	11.89	x	11.89	654		2587
10	B	Blandine Maisonnier	France	10.75	11.04	11.76	11.76	645	SB	2628
11	B	Uhunoma Osazuwa	Nigeria	11.72	11.28	x	11.72	643		2611
12	A	Yu Xiaoxuan	China	11.59	11.14	11.13	11.59	634		2395
13	A	Bárbara Hernando	Spain	11.31	x	x	11.31	616		1411
14	A	Kateřina Cachová	Czech Republic	11.16	x	10.82	11.16	606		2540
15	B	Macarena Reyes	Chile	10.31	10.90	11.14	11.14	604		2234
16	B	Tilia Udelhoven	Germany	11.01	x	10.91	11.01	596		2397
17	B	Jennifer Cotten	Canada	10.75	9.86	10.98	10.98	594	PB	2407
18	B	Yin Li	China	x	10.85	x	10.85	585	SB	2219
19	B	Janet Lawless	South Africa	10.82	x	10.23	10.82	583		2359
20	B	Nana Blakime	Togo	10.72	10.73	10.13	10.73	577		2063
21	B	Lene Myrmel	Norway	10.26	9.95	10.22	10.26	546		2248
22	B	Natasha Miller	Canada	9.83	9.67	10.18	10.18	541		2474
23	B	Ruth Morales	Guatemala	8.57	8.50	8.91	8.91	458		1624
24	B	Wanetta Kirby	United States Virgin Islands	7.79	7.83	8.23	8.23	414		2129

=== 200 metres ===
Wind:
Heat 1: -0.3 m/s, Heat 2: -0.2 m/s, Heat 3: -1.4 m/s

Rank	Heat	Name	Nationality	Time	Points	Notes	Overall
1	3	Olga Kurban	Russia	24.19	963		3715
2	3	Grit Šadeiko	Estonia	24.32	950	PB	3537
3	3	Ellen Sprunger	Switzerland	24.52	931		3310
4	2	Jennifer Cotten	Canada	24.55	929	PB	3336
5	3	Tilia Udelhoven	Germany	24.65	919		3316
6	2	Natasha Miller	Canada	24.70	915	PB	3389
7	2	Uhunoma Osazuwa	Nigeria	24.76	909		3520
8	3	Estefania Fortes	Spain	24.92	894		3268
9	2	Yin Li	China	24.96	890	PB	3109
10	2	Kateřina Cachová	Czech Republic	25.00	887		3427
11	2	Blandine Maisonnier	France	25.02	885		3513
12	3	Inna Akhozova	Ukraine	25.06	881		3409
13	3	Wanetta Kirby	United States Virgin Islands	25.41	850		2979
14	3	Aleksandra Butvina	Russia	25.49	842		3397
15	1	Viktorija Žemaitytė	Lithuania	25.52	840		3608
16	2	Yana Maksimava	Belarus	25.63	830		3512
17	3	Janet Lawless	South Africa	26.10	788		3147
18	1	Nana Blakime	Togo	26.14	785		2848
19	1	Lene Myrmel	Norway	26.23	777	SB	3025
20	1	Bárbara Hernando	Spain	26.51	753	SB	2164
21	1	Sarah Cowley	New Zealand	26.81	728		3240
22	1	Ruth Morales	Guatemala	27.10	704		2328
23	1	Yu Xiaoxuan	China	27.14	700		3095
	2	Macarena Reyes	Chile	DNS	0		DNF

=== Long jump ===
Rank	Group	Athlete	Nationality	#1	#2	#3	Result	Points	Notes	Overall
1	A	Jennifer Cotten	Canada	6.15	6.21	x	6.21	915	PB	4251
2	A	Blandine Maisonnier	France	5.97	5.97	6.12	6.12	887		4400
3	A	Tilia Udelhoven	Germany	5.90	x	6.03	6.03	859		4175
4	A	Olga Kurban	Russia	5.96	6.02	5.98	6.02	856		4571
5	A	Viktorija Žemaitytė	Lithuania	5.87	x	6.02	6.02	856		4464
6	B	Natasha Miller	Canada	x	5.86	5.97	5.97	840	PB	4229
7	A	Kateřina Cachová	Czech Republic	5.78	5.82	x	5.82	795		4222
8	A	Aleksandra Butvina	Russia	5.49	x	5.77	5.77	780		4177
9	B	Ellen Sprunger	Switzerland	x	5.72	5.76	5.76	777	SB	4087
10	B	Uhunoma Osazuwa	Nigeria	5.59	5.71	5.68	5.71	762		4282
11	B	Yin Li	China	5.50	5.71	x	5.71	762		3871
12	B	Lene Myrmel	Norway	5.44	5.34	5.58	5.58	723		3748
13	B	Yu Xiaoxuan	China	5.52	5.55	5.45	5.55	715	PB	3810
14	B	Estefania Fortes	Spain	5.51	5.52	5.53	5.53	709		3977
15	B	Nana Blakime	Togo	5.27	5.49	5.26	5.49	697		3545
16	A	Inna Akhozova	Ukraine	x	x	5.45	5.45	686		4095
17	A	Janet Lawless	South Africa	5.30	5.24	5.43	5.45	680		3827
18	B	Yana Maksimava	Belarus	x	x	5.36	5.36	660		4172
19	B	Bárbara Hernando	Spain	5.20	x	x	5.20	614		2778
20	B	Ruth Morales	Guatemala	4.42	4.85	x	4.85	519	SB	2847
	A	Sarah Cowley	New Zealand	x	x	x	NM	0		3240
	A	Grit Šadeiko	Estonia	x	x	x	NM	0		3537
	B	Wanetta Kirby	United States Virgin Islands	x	x	x	NM	0		2979

=== Javelin throw ===
Rank	Group	Athlete	Nationality	#1	#2	#3	Result	Points	Notes	Overall
1	A	Kateřina Cachová	Czech Republic	45.73	41.73	45.62	45.73	778	SB	5000
2	A	Ellen Sprunger	Switzerland	38.85	x	43.88	43.88	742	PB	4829
3	A	Tilia Udelhoven	Germany	43.65	38.65	40.11	43.65	737		4912
4	A	Estefania Fortes	Spain	x	43.55	42.13	43.55	736	SB	4912
5	A	Yu Xiaoxuan	China	41.27	43.48	42.91	43.48	734		4544
6	A	Olga Kurban	Russia	41.59	38.21	40.26	41.59	698		5269
7	A	Yana Maksimava	Belarus	40.72	40.09	39.56	40.72	681		4853
8	A	Viktorija Žemaitytė	Lithuania	38.94	40.67	40.05	40.67	680		5144
9	A	Aleksandra Butvina	Russia	37.16	38.16	39.05	39.05	649		4826
10	B	Sarah Cowley	New Zealand	34.04	36.51	38.35	38.35	636	PB	3876
11	B	Yin Li	China	35.71	36.31	38.25	38.25	634	SB	4505
12	B	Bárbara Hernando	Spain	29.12	37.51	x	37.51	620		3398
13	B	Lene Myrmel	Norway	36.49	31.37	33.59	36.49	600	SB	4348
14	A	Blandine Maisonnier	France	36.38	35.94	x	36.38	598		4998
15	B	Inna Akhozova	Ukraine	35.22	36.30	35.67	36.30	596	SB	4691
16	B	Uhunoma Osazuwa	Nigeria	34.19	33.46	36.19	36.19	594	PB	4876
17	A	Janet Lawless	South Africa	33.31	35.78	34.57	35.78	587		4414
18	B	Natasha Miller	Canada	31.43	29.66	33.12	33.12	536		4765
19	B	Jennifer Cotten	Canada	31.62	28.45	28.86	31.62	507	PB	4758
20	B	Ruth Morales	Guatemala	29.65	29.65	28.24	30.39	484		3331
21	B	Nana Blakime	Togo	25.52	x	24.42	25.52	392		3937
	A	Grit Šadeiko	Estonia				DNS	0		DNF
	B	Wanetta Kirby	United States Virgin Islands				DNS	0		DNF

=== 800 metres ===
Rank	Heat	Name	Nationality	Time	Points	Notes
1	2	Jennifer Cotten	Canada	2:12.57	927	PB
2	1	Inna Akhozova	Ukraine	2:15.72	883	
3	2	Olga Kurban	Russia	2:15.77	882	SB
4	2	Aleksandra Butvina	Russia	2:16.12	877	
5	2	Kateřina Cachová	Czech Republic	2:16.42	873	PB
6	2	Yana Maksimava	Belarus	2:16.48	872	
7	2	Ellen Sprunger	Switzerland	2:18.17	849	
8	2	Blandine Maisonnier	France	2:18.36	846	
9	2	Tilia Udelhoven	Germany	2:19.56	829	
10	2	Natasha Miller	Canada	2:19.70	828	
11	1	Bárbara Hernando	Spain	2:20.16	821	
12	2	Viktorija Žemaitytė	Lithuania	2:20.67	814	
13	1	Sarah Cowley	New Zealand	2:22.76	786	
14	1	Yin Li	China	2:25.08	756	
15	1	Janet Lawless	South Africa	2:26.65	735	
16	1	Estefania Fortes	Spain	2:27.25	728	
17	2	Uhunoma Osazuwa	Nigeria	2:28.39	713	
18	1	Lene Myrmel	Norway	2:31.86	670	
19	1	Yu Xiaoxuan	China	2:32.88	657	SB
20	1	Nana Blakime	Togo	2:38.20	594	
21	1	Ruth Morales	Guatemala	2:44.17	526	

=== Final standings ===
The highest mark recorded in each event is highlighted in yellow

Rank	Athlete	Nationality	100m H	HJ	SP	200m	LJ	JT	800m	Points	Notes
1st place, gold medalist(s)	Olga Kurban	Russia	13.84	1.80	13.69	24.19	6.02	41.59	2:15.77	6151	
2nd place, silver medalist(s)	Viktorija Žemaitytė	Lithuania	14.35	1.86	13.86	25.52	6.02	40.67	2:20.67	5958	
3rd place, bronze medalist(s)	Kateřina Cachová	Czech Republic	14.16	1.80	11.16	25.00	5.82	45.73	2:16.42	5873	
4	Blandine Maisonnier	France	14.08	1.83	11.76	25.02	6.12	36.38	2:18.36	5844	
5	Tilia Udelhoven	Germany	14.05	1.68	11.01	24.65	6.03	43.65	2:19.56	5741	
6	Yana Maksimava	Belarus	14.31	1.80	13.62	25.63	5.36	40.72	2:16.48	5725	
7	Aleksandra Butvina	Russia	14.59	1.74	13.42	25.49	5.77	39.05	2:16.12	5703	
8	Jennifer Cotten	Canada	13.97	1.68	10.98	24.55	6.21	31.62	2:12.57	5685	
9	Ellen Sprunger	Switzerland	13.96	1.59	12.15	24.52	5.76	43.88	2:18.17	5678	
10	Natasha Miller	Canada	13.64	1.74	10.18	24.70	5.97	33.12	2:19.70	5593	
11	Uhunoma Osazuwa	Nigeria	13.92	1.80	11.72	24.76	5.71	36.19	2:28.39	5589	
12	Inna Akhozova	Ukraine	14.37	1.74	12.56	25.06	5.45	36.30	2:15.72	5574	
13	Estefania Fortes	Spain	14.06	1.56	12.81	24.92	5.53	43.55	2:27.25	5574	
14	Yin Li	China	14.49	1.59	10.85	24.96	5.71	38.25	2:25.08	5261	
15	Yu Xiaoxuan	China	14.34	1.68	11.59	27.14	5.55	43.48	2:32.88	5201	
16	Janet Lawless	South Africa	14.23	1.68	10.82	26.10	5.45	35.78	2:26.65	5149	
17	Lene Myrmel	Norway	14.25	1.62	10.26	26.23	5.58	36.49	2:31.86	5018	
18	Sarah Cowley	New Zealand	14.45	1.77	11.91	26.81	NM	38.35	2:22.76	4662	
19	Nana Blakime	Togo	15.34	1.56	10.73	26.14	5.49	25.52	2:38.20	4531	
20	Bárbara Hernando	Spain	DNF	1.65	11.31	26.51	5.20	37.51	2:20.16	4219	
21	Ruth Morales	Guatemala	17.78	1.53	8.91	27.10	4.85	30.39	2:44.17	3857	
	Grit Šadeiko	Estonia	13.64	1.74	11.89	24.32	NM	DNS	–	DNF	
	Wanetta Kirby	United States Virgin Islands	14.42	1.65	8.23	25.41	NM	DNS	–	DNF	
	Macarena Reyes	Chile	14.52	1.59	11.14	DNS	–	–	–	DNF	
	Györgyi Farkas	Hungary	DNS	–	–	–	–	–	–	DNS	
