= Yana Maksimava =

Belarusian heptathlete

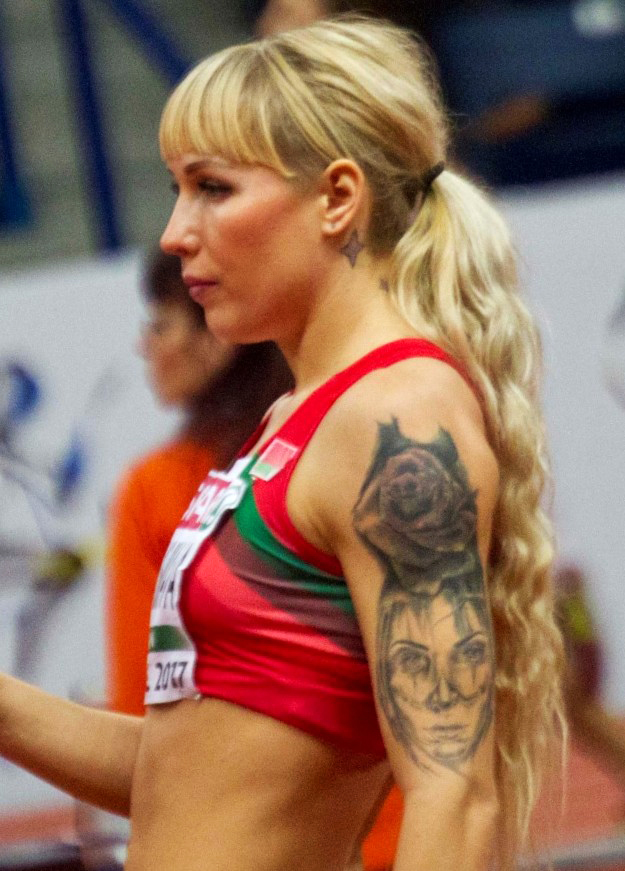
- Yana Maksimava at the 2017 European Indoor Championships.

Personal information
- Full name: Yana Maksimava
- Born: 9 January 1989 (age 37) Vilnius, Lithuanian SSR, Soviet Union
- Height: 1.82 m (5 ft 11 1/2 in)
- Weight: 70 kg (154 lb)

Sport
- Country: Belarus
- Sport: Athletics
- Event: Heptathlon
- Updated on 4 August 2012

Yana Maksimava (Belarusian: Яна Максімава; born 9 January 1989) is a Lithuanian-Belarusian heptathlete. She was born in Vilnius, the capital of the then Lithuanian Soviet Socialist Republic. She is married to fellow Belarusian athlete Andrei Krauchanka. Amid the forced repatriation and subsequent defection of Belarusian sprinter Krystsina Tsimanouskaya at the Summer Olympics in Tokyo in 2021, Maksimava announced that she and her husband would also not be returning to Belarus and would seek asylum in Germany, where the couple trains.

== Career ==
Maksimawa gained her first international experience in 2007 when she finished fifth at the 2007 Junior European Athletics Championshipsin in Hengelo with 5512 points. In the following year, she won the silver medal at the Junior World Championships in Athletics in Bydgoszcz with 5766 points and qualified for the first time to take part in the 2008 Olympic Games in Beijing, where she finished 33rd with 4806 points. In 2009, she finished eleventh at the traditional Hypomeeting in Götzis with 5951 points and then placed fifth at the 2009 Athletics U23 European Championships in Kaunas with 5924 points.

In 2010, she was fifth at the Hypomeeting with 6031 points and reached 18th place at the European Championships in Barcelona with 5838 points. In 2011, she was ninth at the Hypomeeting with 6094 points and then won the bronze medal behind the Estonian Grit Šadeiko and Kateřina Cachová from the Czech Republic. She then took part in the 2011 Summer Universiade in Shenzhen, where she achieved sixth place with 5725 points. In 2012, she finished seventh in the pentathlon at the Track and Field Indoor World Championships in Istanbul with 4601 points. She then achieved 19th place at the Hypomeeting in Götzis with 6040 points and was third at the TNT – Fortuna Meeting in Kladno with 6103 points and then took part again in the 2012 Olympic Summer Games in London and improved there to 6198 points and finished 15th.

In March 2013, she won the silver medal in the pentathlon behind French athlete Antoinette Nana Djimou Ida at the 2013 European Athletics Indoor Championships in Gothenburg with 4658 points. At the Hypomeeting, she reached fourth place with 6194 points and was 20th at the 2013 World Athletics Championships in Moscow with 5982 points. Then she classified herself at the Décastar in Talence with 6001 points in seventh place. At the Athletics Indoor World Championships 2014 in Soot, she was sixth in the pentathlon with 4651 points and at the Hypomeeting she reached 13th place with 6163 points. Then she was classified at the European Championships in Zurich in 16th place with 5983 points and third in the Décastar with 6189 points. In the following year, she came fourth at the Indoor European Championships in Prague with 4628 points and reached 16th place at the Hypomeeting with 5984 points, before finishing seventh at the Décastar with 5853 points. Also at the Hypomeeting 2016, she reached 16th place with 6058 points and then came second at the TNT Express Meeting with 6076 points, before she came in at the 2016 European Athletics Championships in Amsterdam with 5702 points twelve landed.

In 2017, she took eighth place at the 2017 European Athletics Indoor Championships in Belgrade with 4438 points and the following year she was 16th at the Hypomeeting with 5986 points.

In 2012, 2014 and 2016 Maksimawa became the Belarusian high jump champion in the open air and from 2010 to 2014 also in the hall. In addition, she was in 2009 and 2010, from 2013 to 2016, 2018 and 2021 indoor champion in the pentathlon.

Because of her commitment against the Belarusian dictator Alexander Lukashenko, she was not allowed to participate in the 2020 Summer Olympics in Tokyo.

== Personal life ==
She is married to fellow Belarusian athlete Andrei Krauchanka. Amid the forced repatriation and subsequent defection of Belarusian sprinter Krystsina Tsimanouskaya at the Summer Olympics in Tokyo in 2021, Maksimava announced that she and her husband Krauchanka would also not be returning to Belarus and would instead seek asylum in Germany, where the couple trains. Krauchanka had previously been detained in Belarus for taking part in protests against Alexander Lukashenko.

== International competitions ==
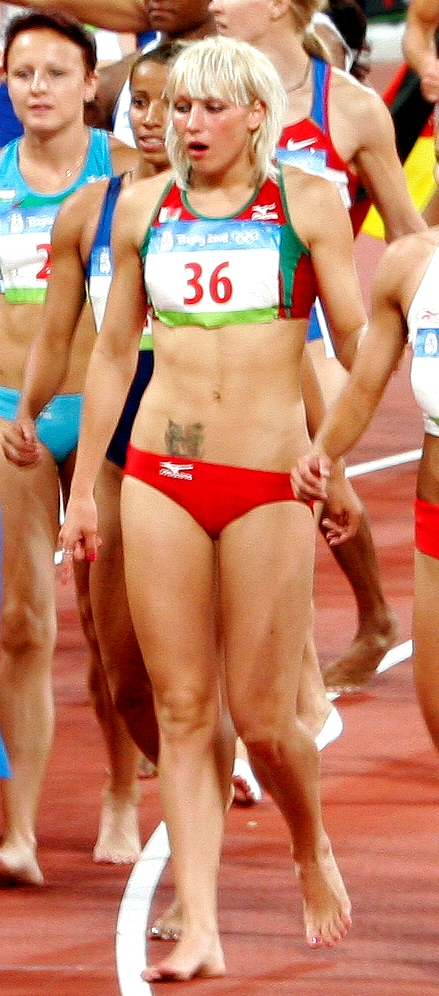
Yana Maksimava walks with other competitors around the track at the 2008 Summer Olympics in Beijing, China.

Year	Competition	Venue	Position	Event	Notes
Representing Belarus
2007	European Junior Championships	Hengelo, Netherlands	5th	Heptathlon	5512 pts
2008	World Junior Championships	Bydgoszcz, Poland	2nd	Heptathlon	5766 pts
2008	Olympic Games	Beijing, China	34th	Heptathlon	4806 pts
2009	European U23 Championships	Kaunas, Lithuania	5th	Heptathlon	5924 pts
2010	European Championships	Barcelona, Spain	18th	Heptathlon	5838 pts
2011	Universiade	Shenzhen, China	6th	Heptathlon	5725 pts
2011	European U23 Championships	Ostrava, Czech Republic	3rd	Heptathlon	6075 pts
2012	World Indoor Championships	Istanbul, Turkey	8th	Pentathlon	4601 pts
2012	Olympic Games	London, United Kingdom	17th	Heptathlon	6198 pts
2013	European Indoor Championships	Gothenburg, Sweden	2nd	Pentathlon	4658 pts
2013	World Championships	Moscow, Russia	20th	Heptathlon	5982 pts
2014	European Championships	Zürich, Switzerland	16th	Heptathlon	5983 pts
2015	European Indoor Championships	Prague, Czech Republic	4th	Pentathlon	4628 pts
2016	European Championships	Amsterdam, Netherlands	16th	Heptathlon	5983 pts
2017	European Indoor Championships	Belgrade, Serbia	8th	Pentathlon	4438 pts
