= 2015 European Athletics Indoor Championships – Women's pentathlon =

The women's pentathlon event at the 2015 European Athletics Indoor Championships was held at March 6, 2015.

== Medalists ==
| Gold | Silver | Bronze |
|---|---|---|
| Katarina Johnson-Thompson; Great Britain | Nafissatou Thiam; Belgium | Eliška Klučinová; Czech Republic |

== Records ==
Standing records prior to the 2015 European Athletics Indoor Championships
| World record | Natallia Dobrynska (UKR) | 5013 | Istanbul, Turkey | 9 March 2012 |
| European record | Natallia Dobrynska (UKR) | 5013 | Istanbul, Turkey | 9 March 2012 |
| Championship record | Carolina Klüft (SWE) | 4948 | Madrid, Spain | 5 March 2005 |
| World Leading | Yana Maksimava (BLR) | 4742 | Gomel, Belarus | 6 February 2015 |
| European Leading | Yana Maksimava (BLR) | 4742 | Gomel, Belarus | 6 February 2015 |

== Results ==
=== 60 metres hurdles ===
| Rank | Heat | Lane | Athlete | Nationality | Time | Notes | Points |
|---|---|---|---|---|---|---|---|
| 1 | 1 | 8 | Katarina Johnson-Thompson | Great Britain | 8.18 | PB | 1088 |
| 2 | 1 | 3 | Antoinette Nana Djimou | France | 8.25 | | 1073 |
| 3 | 1 | 4 | Nadine Broersen | Netherlands | 8.31 | PB | 1059 |
| 4 | 1 | 6 | Anouk Vetter | Netherlands | 8.33 | PB | 1055 |
| 5 | 1 | 2 | Nafissatou Thiam | Belgium | 8.42 | =PB | 1035 |
| 6 | 1 | 5 | Györgyi Zsivoczky-Farkas | Hungary | 8.45 | | 1028 |
| 7 | 2 | 2 | Alina Fyodorova | Ukraine | 8.49 | PB | 1019 |
| 8 | 1 | 7 | Carolin Schäfer | Germany | 8.50 | | 1017 |
| 9 | 2 | 8 | Eliška Klučinová | Czech Republic | 8.53 | PB | 1010 |
| 10 | 2 | 5 | Katsiaryna Netsviatayeva | Belarus | 8.55 | SB | 1006 |
| 11 | 2 | 4 | Anna Blank | Russia | 8.73 | PB | 967 |
| 12 | 2 | 6 | Aleksandra Butvina | Russia | 8.74 | SB | 965 |
| 13 | 2 | 7 | Yana Maksimava | Belarus | 8.76 | | 961 |
| 14 | 2 | 3 | Morgan Lake | Great Britain | 8.81 | PB | 950 |

=== High jump ===
| Rank | Athlete | Nationality | 1.65 | 1.68 | 1.71 | 1.74 | 1.77 | 1.80 | 1.83 | 1.86 | 1.89 | 1.92 | 1.95 | 1.98 | Result | Points | Notes | Total |
|---|---|---|---|---|---|---|---|---|---|---|---|---|---|---|---|---|---|---|
| 1 | Katarina Johnson-Thompson | Great Britain | – | – | – | – | – | – | o | o | xo | xo | o | xxx | 1.95 | 1171 | CB | 2259 |
| 2 | Morgan Lake | Great Britain | – | – | – | – | – | o | xxo | o | xxo | o | xxx | | 1.92 | 1132 | | 2082 |
| 3 | Yana Maksimava | Belarus | – | – | – | – | o | o | o | o | xo | xxx | | | 1.89 | 1093 | | 2054 |
| 4 | Nafissatou Thiam | Belgium | – | – | – | – | – | o | o | xo | xxo | xxx | | | 1.89 | 1093 | SB | 2128 |
| 5 | Eliška Klučinová | Czech Republic | – | – | – | xxo | xo | xxo | o | xo | xxx | | | | 1.86 | 1054 | | 2064 |
| 6 | Antoinette Nana Djimou | France | – | xo | o | xo | xo | xxo | xxx | | | | | | 1.80 | 978 | SB | 2051 |
| 7 | Aleksandra Butvina | Russia | o | o | o | o | o | xxx | | | | | | | 1.77 | 941 | | 1906 |
| 7 | Alina Fyodorova | Ukraine | o | o | o | o | o | xxx | | | | | | | 1.77 | 941 | | 1960 |
| 9 | Györgyi Zsivoczky-Farkas | Hungary | o | – | xo | o | o | xxx | | | | | | | 1.77 | 941 | | 1969 |
| 10 | Anna Blank | Russia | o | o | o | o | xo | xxx | | | | | | | 1.77 | 941 | | 1908 |
| 11 | Anouk Vetter | Netherlands | – | xo | o | xo | xo | xxx | | | | | | | 1.77 | 941 | PB | 1996 |
| 12 | Nadine Broersen | Netherlands | – | – | – | – | xxo | xxr | | | | | | | 1.77 | 941 | | 2000 |
| 12 | Carolin Schäfer | Germany | – | o | o | o | xxo | xxx | | | | | | | 1.77 | 941 | | 1958 |
| 14 | Katsiaryna Netsviatayeva | Belarus | o | o | xo | o | xxx | | | | | | | | 1.74 | 903 | | 1909 |

=== Shot put ===
| Rank | Athlete | Nationality | #1 | #2 | #3 | Result | Notes | Points | Total |
|---|---|---|---|---|---|---|---|---|---|
| 1 | Alina Fyodorova | Ukraine | 15.09 | x | 14.97 | 15.09 | | 867 | 2827 |
| 2 | Eliška Klučinová | Czech Republic | 13.79 | 15.07 | x | 15.07 | PB | 866 | 2930 |
| 3 | Antoinette Nana Djimou | France | 14.38 | 15.05 | 14.84 | 15.05 | | 864 | 2915 |
| 4 | Katsiaryna Netsviatayeva | Belarus | 14.83 | 14.97 | 14.77 | 14.97 | PB | 859 | 2768 |
| 5 | Yana Maksimava | Belarus | 14.72 | 14.39 | 14.96 | 14.96 | SB | 858 | 2912 |
| 6 | Aleksandra Butvina | Russia | 14.96 | 14.43 | 14.47 | 14.96 | | 858 | 2764 |
| 7 | Anouk Vetter | Netherlands | 14.34 | 14.80 | x | 14.80 | PB | 846 | 2844 |
| 8 | Nafissatou Thiam | Belgium | 13.72 | 13.76 | 14.80 | 14.80 | PB | 846 | 2976 |
| 9 | Györgyi Zsivoczky-Farkas | Hungary | 14.20 | x | 14.10 | 14.20 | | 807 | 2776 |
| 10 | Anna Blank | Russia | 13.76 | 14.11 | 14.09 | 14.11 | PB | 801 | 2709 |
| 11 | Morgan Lake | Great Britain | 13.91 | x | 13.62 | 13.91 | PB | 788 | 2870 |
| 12 | Carolin Schäfer | Germany | 12.25 | 12.05 | 13.41 | 13.41 | PB | 755 | 2713 |
| 13 | Katarina Johnson-Thompson | Great Britain | 11.63 | 12.32 | 11.88 | 12.32 | =SB | 682 | 2941 |
| | Nadine Broersen | Netherlands | | | | DNS | | 0 | DNF |

=== Long jump ===
| Rank | Athlete | Nationality | #1 | #2 | #3 | Result | Notes | Points | Total |
|---|---|---|---|---|---|---|---|---|---|
| 1 | Katarina Johnson-Thompson | Great Britain | 6.89 | x | x | 6.89 | WB | 1135 | 4076 |
| 2 | Nafissatou Thiam | Belgium | 6.17 | 6.17 | 6.33 | 6.33 | SB | 953 | 3929 |
| 3 | Anouk Vetter | Netherlands | 5.61 | 6.29 | – | 6.29 | PB | 940 | 3784 |
| 4 | Alina Fyodorova | Ukraine | 5.93 | 6.22 | 6.21 | 6.22 | | 918 | 3745 |
| 5 | Eliška Klučinová | Czech Republic | 6.14 | 6.10 | 6.15 | 6.15 | | 896 | 3826 |
| 6 | Antoinette Nana Djimou | France | 6.07 | x | 6.13 | 6.13 | | 890 | 3805 |
| 7 | Morgan Lake | Great Britain | 6.06 | 6.10 | x | 6.10 | | 880 | 3750 |
| 8 | Györgyi Zsivoczky-Farkas | Hungary | 5.95 | x | 6.10 | 6.10 | | 880 | 3656 |
| 9 | Anna Blank | Russia | 6.03 | 5.97 | 5.86 | 6.03 | | 859 | 3568 |
| 10 | Aleksandra Butvina | Russia | x | 6.03 | 5.74 | 6.03 | SB | 859 | 3623 |
| 11 | Carolin Schäfer | Germany | 5.79 | 5.95 | 5.95 | 5.95 | SB | 834 | 3547 |
| 12 | Yana Maksimava | Belarus | x | 5.85 | 5.77 | 5.85 | | 804 | 3716 |
| 13 | Katsiaryna Netsviatayeva | Belarus | 5.52 | 5.68 | x | 5.68 | | 753 | 3521 |

=== 800 metres ===
| Rank | Heat | Lane | Athlete | Nationality | Time | Notes | Points |
|---|---|---|---|---|---|---|---|
| 1 | 2 | 5 | Katarina Johnson-Thompson | Great Britain | 2:12.78 | PB | 924 |
| 2 | 1 | 4 | Anna Blank | Russia | 2:13.04 | PB | 921 |
| 3 | 1 | 5 | Yana Maksimava | Belarus | 2:13.67 | SB | 912 |
| 4 | 1 | 6 | Györgyi Zsivoczky-Farkas | Hungary | 2:13.91 | PB | 908 |
| 5 | 1 | 3 | Aleksandra Butvina | Russia | 2:14.84 | SB | 895 |
| 6 | 1 | 2 | Katsiaryna Netsviatayeva | Belarus | 2:15.00 | | 893 |
| 7 | 2 | 4 | Eliška Klučinová | Czech Republic | 2:17.26 | PB | 861 |
| 8 | 2 | 2 | Alina Fyodorova | Ukraine | 2:20.38 | SB | 818 |
| 9 | 2 | 3 | Antoinette Nana Djimou | France | 2:22.78 | | 786 |
| 10 | 2 | 2 | Morgan Lake | Great Britain | 2:23.44 | PB | 777 |
| 11 | 2 | 6 | Nafissatou Thiam | Belgium | 2:24.23 | | 767 |
| 12 | 2 | 1 | Anouk Vetter | Netherlands | 2:24.48 | | 764 |
| | 1 | 1 | Carolin Schäfer | Germany | DNS | | 0 |

== Final standings ==
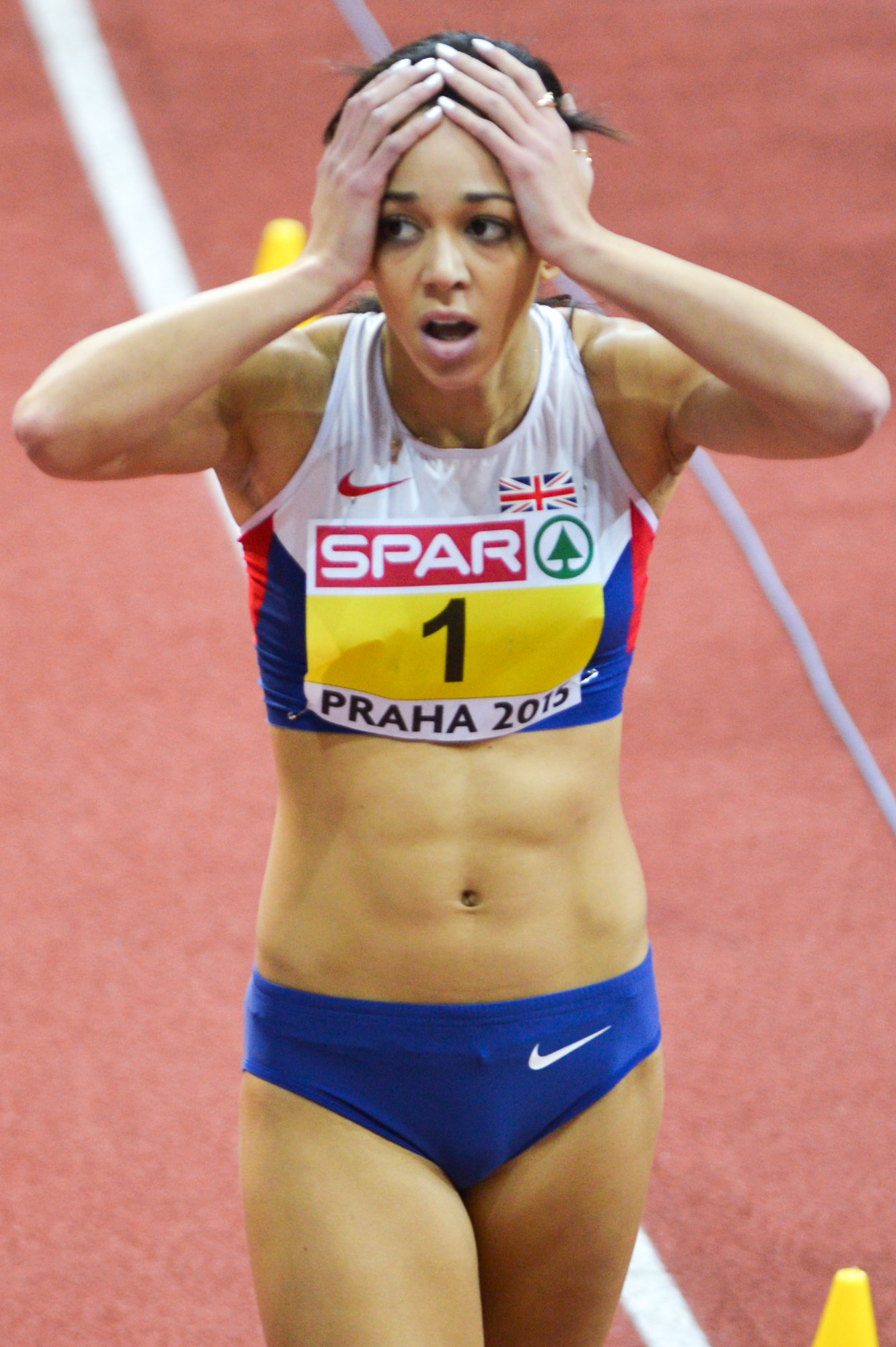
The winner, Katarina Johnson-Thompson, at the end of the competition.

| Rank | Athlete | Nationality | #Points | Note |
|---|---|---|---|---|
| 1st place, gold medalist(s) | Katarina Johnson-Thompson | Great Britain | 5000 | CR, NR, WL |
| 2nd place, silver medalist(s) | Nafissatou Thiam | Belgium | 4696 | PB |
| 3rd place, bronze medalist(s) | Eliška Klučinová | Czech Republic | 4687 | NR |
| 4 | Yana Maksimava | Belarus | 4628 | |
| 5 | Antoinette Nana Djimou | France | 4591 | |
| 6 | Györgyi Zsivoczky-Farkas | Hungary | 4564 | |
| 7 | Alina Fyodorova | Ukraine | 4563 | |
| 8 | Anouk Vetter | Netherlands | 4548 | |
| 9 | Morgan Lake | Great Britain | 4527 | PB |
| 10 | Aleksandra Butvina | Russia | 4518 | SB |
| 11 | Anna Blank | Russia | 4489 | PB |
| 12 | Katsiaryna Netsviatayeva | Belarus | 4414 | |
| | Carolin Schäfer | Germany | DNF | |
| | Nadine Broersen | Netherlands | DNF | |
