= 2014 IAAF World Indoor Championships – Women's pentathlon =

The women's pentathlon at the 2014 IAAF World Indoor Championships took place on 7 March 2014.

== Medalists ==
Gold	Silver	Bronze
Nadine Broersen; Netherlands	Brianne Theisen-Eaton; Canada	Alina Fyodorova; Ukraine

== Records ==
Standing records prior to the 2014 IAAF World Indoor Championships
World record	Natallia Dobrynska (UKR)	5013	Istanbul, Turkey	9 March 2012
Championship record	Natallia Dobrynska (UKR)	5013	Istanbul, Turkey	9 March 2012
World Leading	Sharon Day (USA)	4805	Albuquerque, United States	21 February 2014
African record	Eunice Barber (SLE)	4558	Paris, France	17 March 1993
Asian record	Olga Rypakova (KAZ)	4582	Pattaya, Thailand	10 February 2006
European record	Natallia Dobrynska (UKR)	5013	Istanbul, Turkey	9 March 2012
North and Central American and Caribbean record	Sharon Day (USA)	4805	Albuquerque, United States	21 February 2014
Oceanian Record	Jane Jamieson (AUS)	4490	Maebashi, Japan	5 March 1999
South American record	Vanessa Spinola (BRA)	4261	Tallinn, Estonia	2 February 2013
Records broken during the 2014 IAAF World Indoor Championships
World Leading	Nadine Broersen (NED)	4830	Sopot, Poland	7 March 2014

== Qualification standards ==
Eight athletes were invited by the IAAF in the Heptathlon and in the Pentathlon as follows:

1. the winner of the 2013 Combined Events Challenge
2. the three best athletes from the 2013 Outdoor Lists (as at 31 December 2013), limited to a maximum of one per country
3. the three best athletes from the 2014 Indoor Lists (as at 17 February 2014)
4. one athlete which was invited at the discretion of the IAAF

In total no more than two male and two female athletes from any one Member were invited. Upon refusals or cancellations, the invitations should be extended to the next ranked athletes in the same lists respecting the above conditions.

== Schedule ==
Date	Time	Round
March 7, 2014	12:00	60 metres hurdles
March 7, 2014	12:35	High jump
March 7, 2014	14:15	Shot put
March 7, 2014	18:00	Long jump
March 7, 2014	20:10	800 metres
March 7, 2014	20:10	Final standings

== Results ==
=== 60 metres hurdles ===
Rank	Lane	Name	Nationality	Result	Points	Notes
1	5	Brianne Theisen-Eaton	Canada	8.13	1100	PB
2	6	Hanna Melnychenko	Ukraine	8.18	1088	PB
3	8	Nadine Broersen	Netherlands	8.32	1057	PB
4	1	Sharon Day-Monroe	United States	8.43	1032	PB
5	2	Claudia Rath	Germany	8.43	1032	PB
6	4	Karolina Tymińska	Poland	8.50	1017	
7	7	Alina Fyodorova	Ukraine	8.52	1013	PB
8	3	Yana Maksimava	Belarus	8.75	963	

=== High jump ===
Rank	Name	Nationality	1.63	1.66	1.69	1.72	1.75	1.78	1.81	1.84	1.87	1.90	1.93	1.96	Result	Points	Notes	Overall
1	Nadine Broersen	Netherlands	–	–	–	–	o	o	o	o	o	o	xo	xxx	1.93	1145	NR	2202
2	Yana Maksimava	Belarus	–	–	–	–	–	o	o	xxo	o	xxx			1.87	1067		2030
3	Alina Fyodorova	Ukraine	o	o	o	o	o	xo	xo	o	xxx				1.84	1029	SB	2042
4	Sharon Day-Monroe	United States	–	–	–	–	o	o	o	o	xo	xxx			1.84	1029		2061
5	Brianne Theisen-Eaton	Canada	–	–	–	o	o	xxo	o	xo	xxx				1.84	1029	SB	2129
6	Hanna Melnychenko	Ukraine	–	o	o	o	o	xo	o	xxx					1.81	991	SB	2079
7	Claudia Rath	Germany	–	o	o	o	o	xxo	xxx						1.78	953	SB	1985
8	Karolina Tymińska	Poland	o	o	o	o	xxo	xxx							1.75	916	=PB	1933

=== Shot put ===
Rank	Name	Nationality	#1	#2	#3	Result	Points	Notes	Overall
1	Alina Fyodorova	Ukraine	14.28	15.25	15.05	15.25	864		2906
2	Sharon Day-Monroe	United States	14.85	x	14.95	14.95	858		2919
3	Yana Maksimava	Belarus	14.93	x	14.59	14.93	856	SB	2886
4	Nadine Broersen	Netherlands	14.59	x	x	14.59	833		3035
5	Karolina Tymińska	Poland	12.50	13.68	14.36	14.36	818		2751
6	Brianne Theisen-Eaton	Canada	13.86	13.48	x	13.86	785	PB	2914
7	Claudia Rath	Germany	13.66	13.35	13.11	13.66	771	PB	2756
8	Hanna Melnychenko	Ukraine	13.02	x	x	13.02	729		2808

=== Long jump ===
Rank	Name	Nationality	#1	#2	#3	Result	Points	Notes	Overall
1	Claudia Rath	Germany	x	6.37	6.25	6.37	965		3721
2	Hanna Melnychenko	Ukraine	5.93	x	6.27	6.27	934	SB	3742
3	Alina Fyodorova	Ukraine	6.04	6.26	6.16	6.26	930		3836
4	Nadine Broersen	Netherlands	6.00	6.17	5.79	6.17	902	SB	3937
5	Brianne Theisen-Eaton	Canada	x	x	6.13	6.13	890		3804
6	Karolina Tymińska	Poland	x	6.07	x	6.07	871		3622
7	Sharon Day-Monroe	United States	5.82	5.81	5.94	5.94	831		3750
8	Yana Maksimava	Belarus	x	5.90	4.01	5.90	819		3705

=== 800 metres ===
Rank	Name	Nationality	Result	Points	Notes	Overall
1	Sharon Day-Monroe	United States	2:09.80	968	PB	4718
2	Brianne Theisen-Eaton	Canada	2:10.07	964	PB	4768
3	Claudia Rath	Germany	2:10.29	960	PB	4681
4	Yana Maksimava	Belarus	2:11.28	946	PB	4651
5	Karolina Tymińska	Poland	2:12.03	935	SB	4557
6	Nadine Broersen	Netherlands	2:14.97	893	PB	4830
7	Alina Fyodorova	Ukraine	2:15.31	888	PB	4724
8	Hanna Melnychenko	Ukraine	2:18.40	845	SB	4587

=== Final standings ===
The highest mark recorded in each event is highlighted in yellow

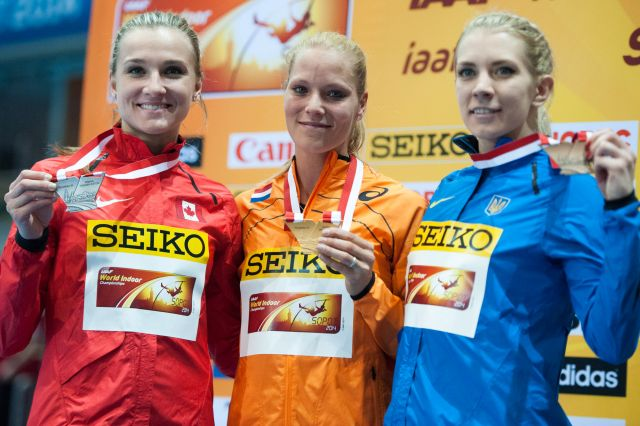
The medalists (left to right): Brianne Theisen-Eaton, Nadine Broersen, Alina Fyodorova

Rank	Name	Nationality	60m	HJ	SP	LJ	800m	Points	Notes
1st place, gold medalist(s)	Nadine Broersen	Netherlands	8.32	1.93	14.59	6.17	2:14.97	4830	WL, NR
2nd place, silver medalist(s)	Brianne Theisen-Eaton	Canada	8.13	1.84	13.86	6.13	2:10.07	4768	NR
3rd place, bronze medalist(s)	Alina Fyodorova	Ukraine	8.52	1.84	15.05	6.26	2:15.31	4724	PB
4	Sharon Day-Monroe	United States	8.43	1.84	14.95	5.94	2:09.80	4718	
5	Claudia Rath	Germany	8.43	1.78	13.66	6.37	2:10.29	4681	PB
6	Yana Maksimava	Belarus	8.75	1.87	14.93	5.90	2:11.28	4651	
7	Hanna Melnychenko	Ukraine	8.18	1.81	13.02	6.27	2:18.40	4587	SB
8	Karolina Tymińska	Poland	8.50	1.75	14.36	6.07	2:12.03	4557	SB
