= 2008 World Junior Championships in Athletics – Women's heptathlon =

Women's heptathlon event

The women's heptathlon event at the 2008 World Junior Championships in Athletics was held in Bydgoszcz, Poland, at Zawisza Stadium on 11 and 12 July.

== Medalists ==
Gold	Carolin Schäfer; Germany
Silver	Yana Maksimava; Belarus
Bronze	Grit Šadeiko; Estonia

== Results ==
=== Final ===
11/12 July

The highest mark recorded in each event is highlighted in yellow

Rank	Name	Nationality	100m H	HJ	SP	200m	LJ	JT	800m	Points	Notes
1st place, gold medalist(s)	Carolin Schäfer	Germany	14.10 (w: -0.2 m/s)	1.78	12.42	24.53 (w: -0.5 m/s)	5.78	44.02	2:24.05	5833	
2nd place, silver medalist(s)	Yana Maksimava	Belarus	14.68 (w: -0.2 m/s)	1.81	13.87	25.97 (w: -2.6 m/s)	5.82	39.63	2:17.98	5766	
3rd place, bronze medalist(s)	Grit Šadeiko	Estonia	14.19 (w: -0.2 m/s)	1.69	11.85	24.80 (w: -0.5 m/s)	5.92	50.04	2:27.15	5765	
4	Natalya Gizbullina	Russia	13.89 (w: -0.4 m/s)	1.78	11.24	25.63 (w: -2.5 m/s)	6.01	38.31	2:18.31	5723	
5	Elisa-Sophie Döbel	Germany	14.50 (w: -0.2 m/s)	1.72	10.57	25.14 (w: -0.5 m/s)	5.94	39.79	2:20.80	5536	
6	Amanda Spiljard	Netherlands	15.27 (w: -1.5 m/s)	1.78	12.20	25.10 (w: -0.5 m/s)	5.93	35.97	2:21.38	5534	
7	Helga Margrét Þorsteinsdóttir	Iceland	15.07 (w: -1.5 m/s)	1.72	12.83	24.95 (w: -0.5 m/s)	5.62	36.71	2:17.44	5516	
8	Frida Lindhe	Sweden	14.45 (w: -0.2 m/s)	1.69	11.96	26.18 (w: -2.6 m/s)	5.49	45.06	2:18.03	5509	
9	Ryann Krais	United States	13.73 (w: -0.2 m/s)	1.72	10.56	25.04 (w: -2.5 m/s)	5.72	31.88	2:19.15	5457	
10	Léa Sprunger	Switzerland	14.61 (w: -0.2 m/s)	1.78	10.56	24.46 (w: -0.5 m/s)	5.99	36.17	2:32.56	5451	
11	Diana Dumitrescu	Romania	14.37 (w: -0.4 m/s)	1.69	12.78	25.92 (w: -2.5 m/s)	5.98	35.33	2:28.44	5420	
12	Katsiaryna Netsviatayeva	Belarus	14.89 (w: -0.4 m/s)	1.66	12.78	26.17 (w: -2.5 m/s)	5.51	37.70	2:15.72	5366	
13	Maiju Mattila	Finland	15.09 (w: -0.2 m/s)	1.69	12.50	26.36 (w: -2.6 m/s)	5.77	46.62	2:33.86	5352	
14	Malgorzata Reszka	Poland	15.69 (w: -1.5 m/s)	1.69	10.63	25.48 (w: -2.6 m/s)	6.16	38.99	2:24.19	5323	
15	Linda Treiel	Estonia	15.71 (w: -0.4 m/s)	1.78	13.66	27.66 (w: -2.5 m/s)	5.43	46.83	2:33.22	5264	
16	Vanessa Spínola	Brazil	14.27 (w: -0.4 m/s)	1.54	12.36	25.24 (w: -0.5 m/s)	5.70	37.98	2:30.41	5233	
17	Lucie Ondraschková	Czech Republic	14.99 (w: -1.5 m/s)	1.69	9.95	25.84 (w: -2.6 m/s)	5.70	32.14	2:16.81	5165	
18	Alina Fyodorova	Ukraine	15.29 (w: -1.5 m/s)	1.81	12.52	26.55 (w: -2.6 m/s)	5.58	35.49	2:35.97	5165	
19	Andrea Nybäck	Sweden	14.39 (w: -0.4 m/s)	1.63	10.61	25.57 (w: -2.5 m/s)	5.70	29.55	2:24.77	5086	
20	Salcia Slack	Jamaica	15.57 (w: -0.4 m/s)	1.60	11.39	26.48 (w: -2.5 m/s)	5.27	39.56	2:31.31	4851	
21	Karine Farias	Brazil	16.17 (w: -1.5 m/s)	1.54	11.46	26.88 (w: -2.6 m/s)	5.35	37.61	2:22.72	4773	
22	Nikola Ogrodníková	Czech Republic	14.12 (w: -1.5 m/s)	1.69	12.06	26.47 (w: -2.6 m/s)	5.54	46.81	DNF	4735	
23	Lisa Egarter	Austria	15.07 (w: -1.5 m/s)	1.66	11.44	26.84 (w: -2.5 m/s)	5.32	33.28	DNF	4174	
	Erin Sampley	United States	13.88 (w: -0.4 m/s)	DNF	10.18	24.04 (w: -0.5 m/s)	DNS	DNS	DNS	DNF	

== Participation ==
According to an unofficial count, 24 athletes from 17 countries participated in the event.

- Austria (1)
- Belarus (2)
- Brazil (2)
- Czech Republic (2)
- Estonia (2)
- Finland (1)
- Germany (2)
- Iceland (1)
- Jamaica (1)
- Netherlands (1)
- Poland (1)
- Romania (1)
- Russia (1)
- Sweden (2)
- Switzerland (1)
- Ukraine (1)
- United States (2)
