= Hanna Melnychenko =

Ukrainian heptathlete

Hanna Kasyanova
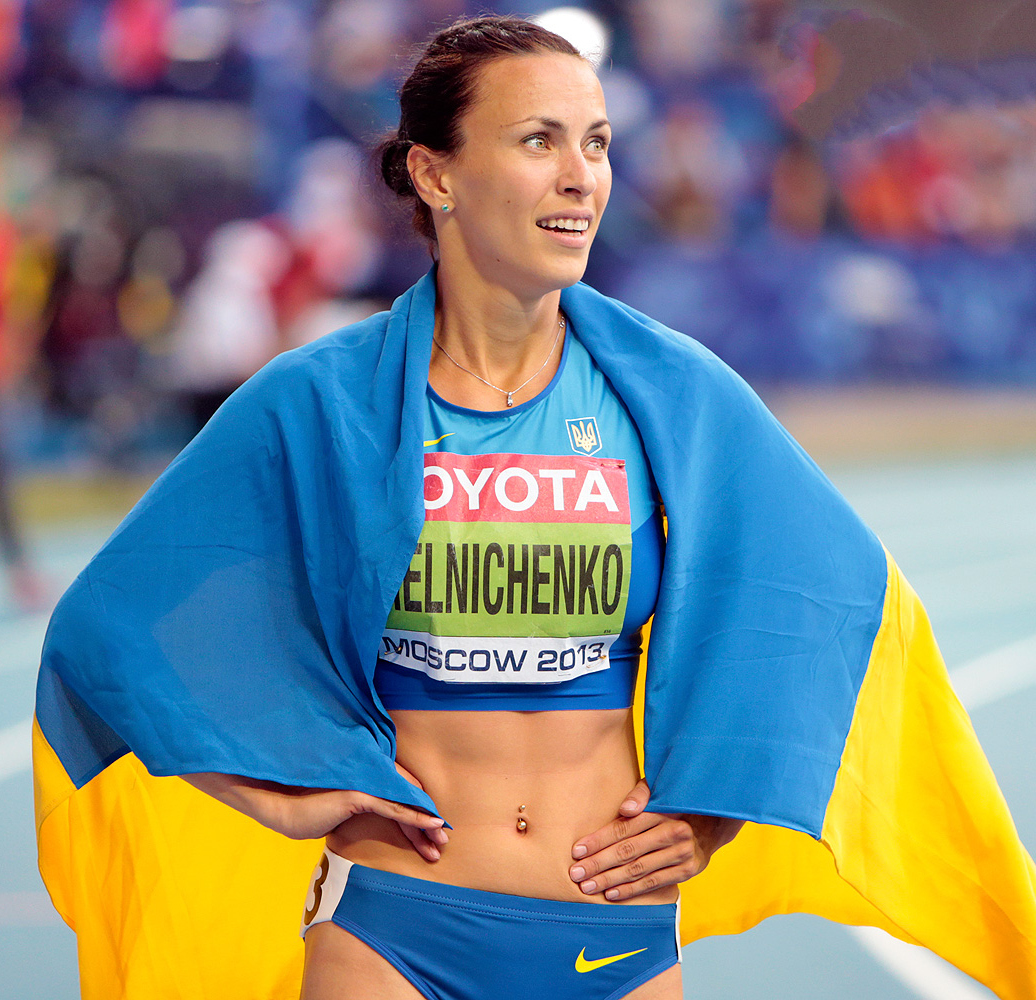
- Kasyanova at the 2013 World Championships in Athletics

Personal information
- Full name: Hanna Anatoliïvna Kasyanova
- Born: 24 April 1983 (age 43) Tbilisi, Georgian SSR, Soviet Union
- Height: 1.78 m (5 ft 10 in)
- Weight: 65 kg (143 lb)

Sport
- Country: Ukraine
- Sport: Athletics
- Event: Heptathlon
Medal record
World Championships
Gold medal – first place	2013 Moscow	Heptathlon
European Indoor Championships
Bronze medal – third place	2013 Gothenburg	Pentathlon
Summer Universiade
Bronze medal – third place	2007 Bangkok	Heptathlon

Hanna Anatoliïvna Kasyanova (née Melnychenko) (Ukrainian: Ганна Анатоліївна Мельниченко; born 24 April 1983 in Tbilisi, Georgia) is a Ukrainian heptathlete.

== Career ==
Kasyanova won the 2013 Décastar competition with 6308 points.

== Personal life ==
Kasyanova was married to Italian decathlete William Frullani. Since 2014, she is married to Ukrainian decathlete Oleksiy Kasyanov.

== Achievements ==
Year	Competition	Venue	Position	Event	Notes
Representing Ukraine
2005	European U23 Championships	Erfurt, Germany	13th	Heptathlon	5502 pts
2007	European Indoor Championships	Birmingham, United Kingdom	10th	Pentathlon	4397 pts
2007	Universiade	Bangkok, Thailand	3rd	Heptathlon	5852 pts
2007	World Championships	Osaka, Japan	—	Heptathlon	DNF
2008	Olympic Games	Beijing, China	14th	Heptathlon	6165 pts
2009	Hypo-Meeting	Götzis, Austria	2nd	Heptathlon	6445 pts
2009	World Championships	Berlin, Germany	6th	Heptathlon	6414 pts
2010	European Championships	Barcelona, Spain	—	Heptathlon	DNF
2012	World Indoor Championships	Istanbul, Turkey	7th	Pentathlon	4623 pts
2012	Olympic Games	London, United Kingdom	10th	Heptathlon	6392 pts
2013	European Indoor Championships	Gothenburg, Sweden	3rd	Pentathlon	4604 pts
2013	World Championships	Moscow, Russia	1st	Heptathlon	6586 pts
2014	World Indoor Championships	Sopot, Poland	7th	Pentathlon	4587 pts
2016	Olympic Games	Rio de Janeiro, Brazil	25th	Heptathlon	5951 pts
