= 2011 European Athletics U23 Championships – Women's heptathlon =

The Women's heptathlon event at the 2011 European Athletics U23 Championships was held in Ostrava, Czech Republic, at Městský stadion on 16 and 17 July.

== Medalists ==
Gold	Grit Šadeiko; Estonia
Silver	Kateřina Cachová; Czech Republic
Bronze	Yana Maksimava; Belarus

== Results ==
=== Final ===
17 July 2011 / 18:40

Rank	Name	Nationality	Points	Notes
1st place, gold medalist(s)	Grit Šadeiko	Estonia	6134	PB
2nd place, silver medalist(s)	Kateřina Cachová	Czech Republic	6123	PB
3rd place, bronze medalist(s)	Yana Maksimava	Belarus	6075	
4	Anastasiya Belyakova	Russia	6010	PB
5	Carolin Schäfer	Germany	5941	PB
6	Alina Fyodorova	Ukraine	5896	
7	Kristina Savitskaya	Russia	5834	
8	Judith Nagy	Romania	5772	PB
9	Nadine Broersen	Netherlands	5740	
10	Izabela Mikołajczyk	Poland	5729	
11	Mari Klaup	Estonia	5445	
12	Lucija Cvitanović	Croatia	5438	PB
13	Ellinor Rosenquist	Sweden	5359	
14	Elisabeth Graf	Switzerland	5279	PB
15	Michelle Zeltner	Switzerland	5238	PB
16	Léa Sprunger	Switzerland	4808	
17	Lucie Ondraschková	Czech Republic	4625	
	Helga Margrét Þorsteinsdóttir	Iceland	DNF	

== Participation ==
According to an unofficial count, 18 athletes from 13 countries participated in the event.

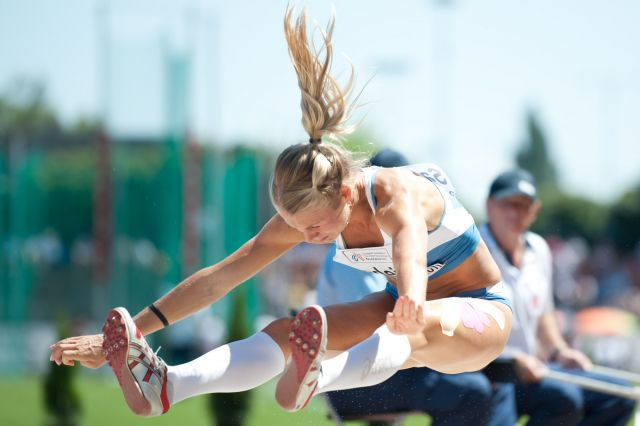
The winner, Grit Šadeiko

- Belarus (1)
- Croatia (1)
- Czech Republic (2)
- Estonia (2)
- Germany (1)
- Iceland (1)
- Netherlands (1)
- Poland (1)
- Romania (1)
- Russia (2)
- Sweden (1)
- Switzerland (3)
- Ukraine (1)
