= Carolin Schäfer =

German heptathlete (born 1991)

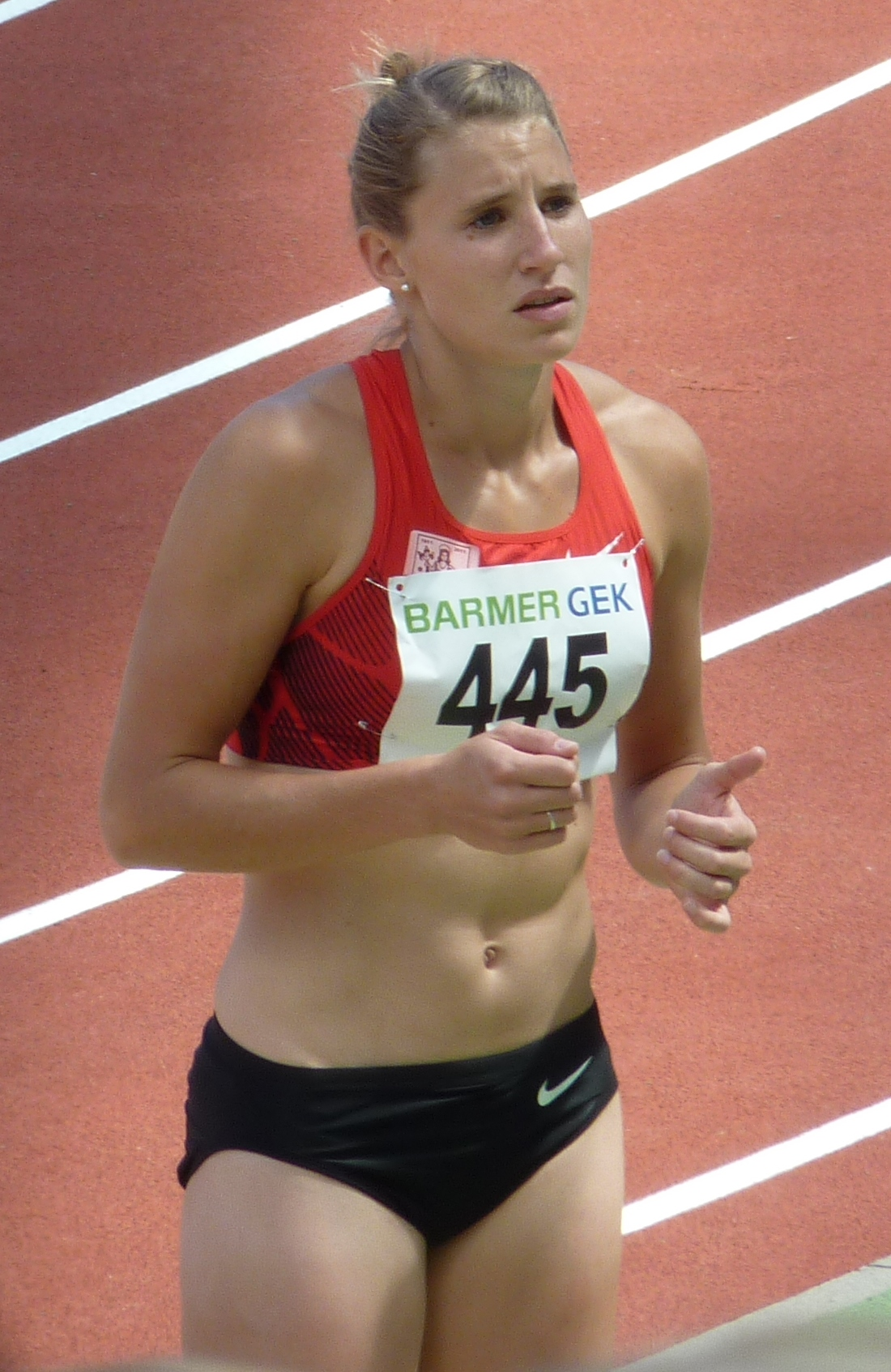
- Schäfer in 2015

Personal information
- Born: 5 December 1991 (age 34) Bad Wildungen, Germany
- Height: 1.78 m (5 ft 10 in)
- Weight: 65 kg (143 lb)

Sport
- Country: Germany
- Sport: Athletics
- Event: Heptathlon
Medal record
Women's athletics
Representing Germany
World Championships
Silver medal – second place	2017 London	Heptathlon
European Championships
Bronze medal – third place	2018 Berlin	Heptathlon
World Junior Championships
Gold medal – first place	2008 Bydgoszcz	Heptathlon
European Junior Championships
Gold medal – first place	2009 Novi Sad	Heptathlon
World Youth Championships
Silver medal – second place	2007 Ostrava	Heptathlon

Carolin Schäfer (born 5 December 1991) is a German athlete who specialises in the heptathlon. She won the silver medal in the event at the 2017 World Championships in Athletics. Schäfer took bronze at the 2018 European Athletics Championships.

At the age of 15, she won the silver medal at the 2007 World Youth Championships. She was the heptathlon 2008 World junior and 2009 European junior champion. Schäfer represented Germany at the 2016 Rio and 2020 Tokyo Olympics, where she finished fifth and seventh respectively.

== Statistics ==
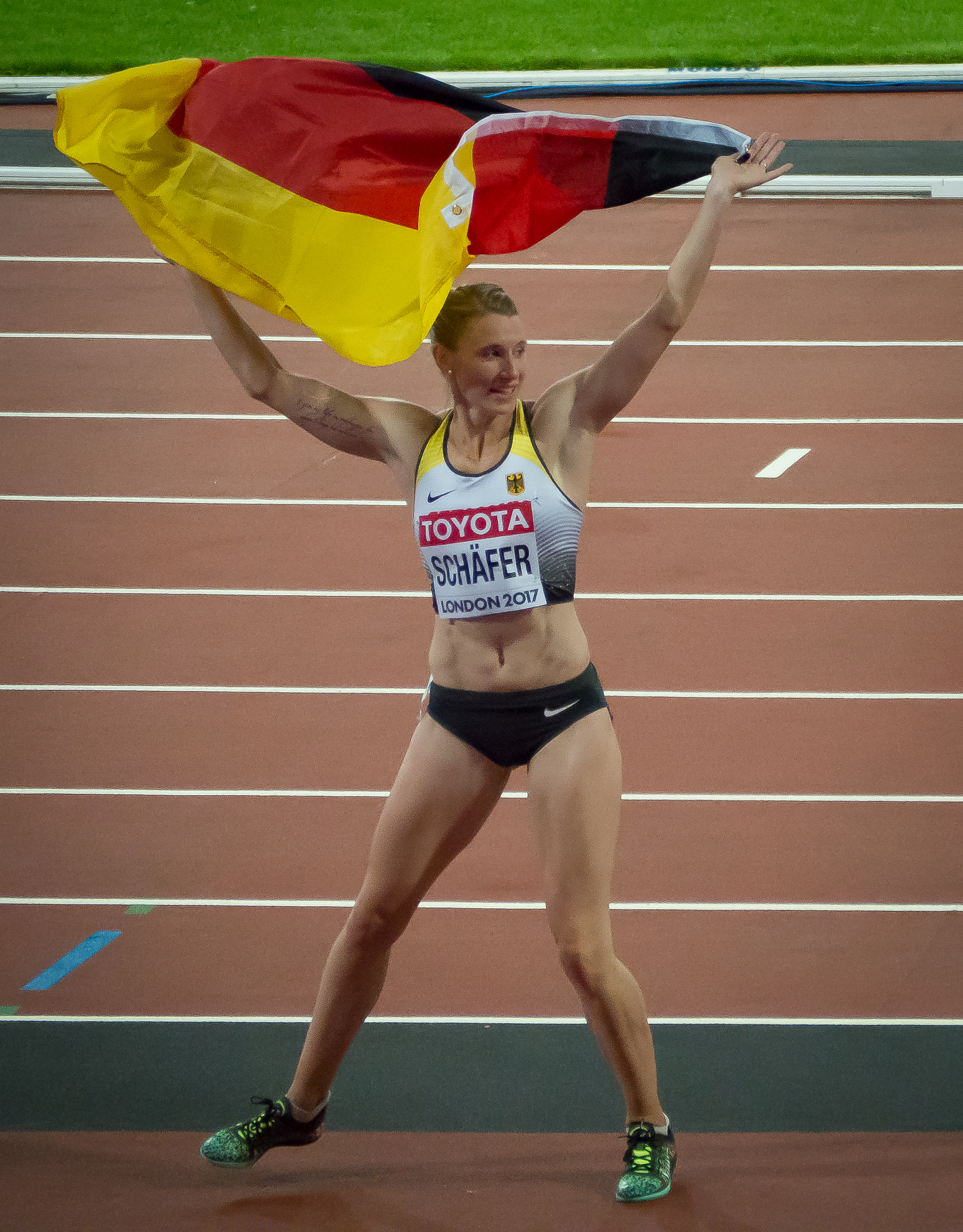
Schäfer celebrates after winning silver at the 2017 World Championships in London.

=== International competitions ===
Representing Germany
Year	Competition	Venue	Position	Event	Result
2007	World Youth Championships	Ostrava, Czech Republic	2nd	Heptathlon	5544 PB
2008	World Junior Championships	Bydgoszcz, Poland	1st	Heptathlon	5833 pts PB
2009	European Junior Championships	Novi Sad, Serbia	1st	Heptathlon	5697 pts SB
2011	European U23 Championships	Ostrava, Czech Republic	5th	Heptathlon	5941 pts PB
2012	European Championships	Helsinki, Finland	11th	Heptathlon	6003 pts
2013	European U23 Championships	Tampere, Finland	6th	Heptathlon	5809 pts
2014	European Championships	Zürich, Switzerland	4th	Heptathlon	6395 pts PB
2015	European Indoor Championships	Prague, Czech Republic	–	Pentathlon	DNF
2015	World Championships	Beijing, China	–	Heptathlon	DNF
2016	Olympic Games	Rio de Janeiro, Brazil	5th	Heptathlon	6540 pts
2017	World Championships	London, United Kingdom	2nd	Heptathlon	6696 pts
2018	European Championships	Berlin, Germany	3rd	Heptathlon	6602 pts
2021	Olympic Games	Tokyo, Japan	7th	Heptathlon	6419 pts
2022	European Championships	Munich, Germany	6th	Heptathlon	6223 pts
2023	World Championships	Budapest, Hungary	—	Heptathlon	DNF
2024	European Championships	Rome, Italy	–	Heptathlon	DNF
2024	Olympic Games	Paris, France	17th	Heptathlon	6084 pts

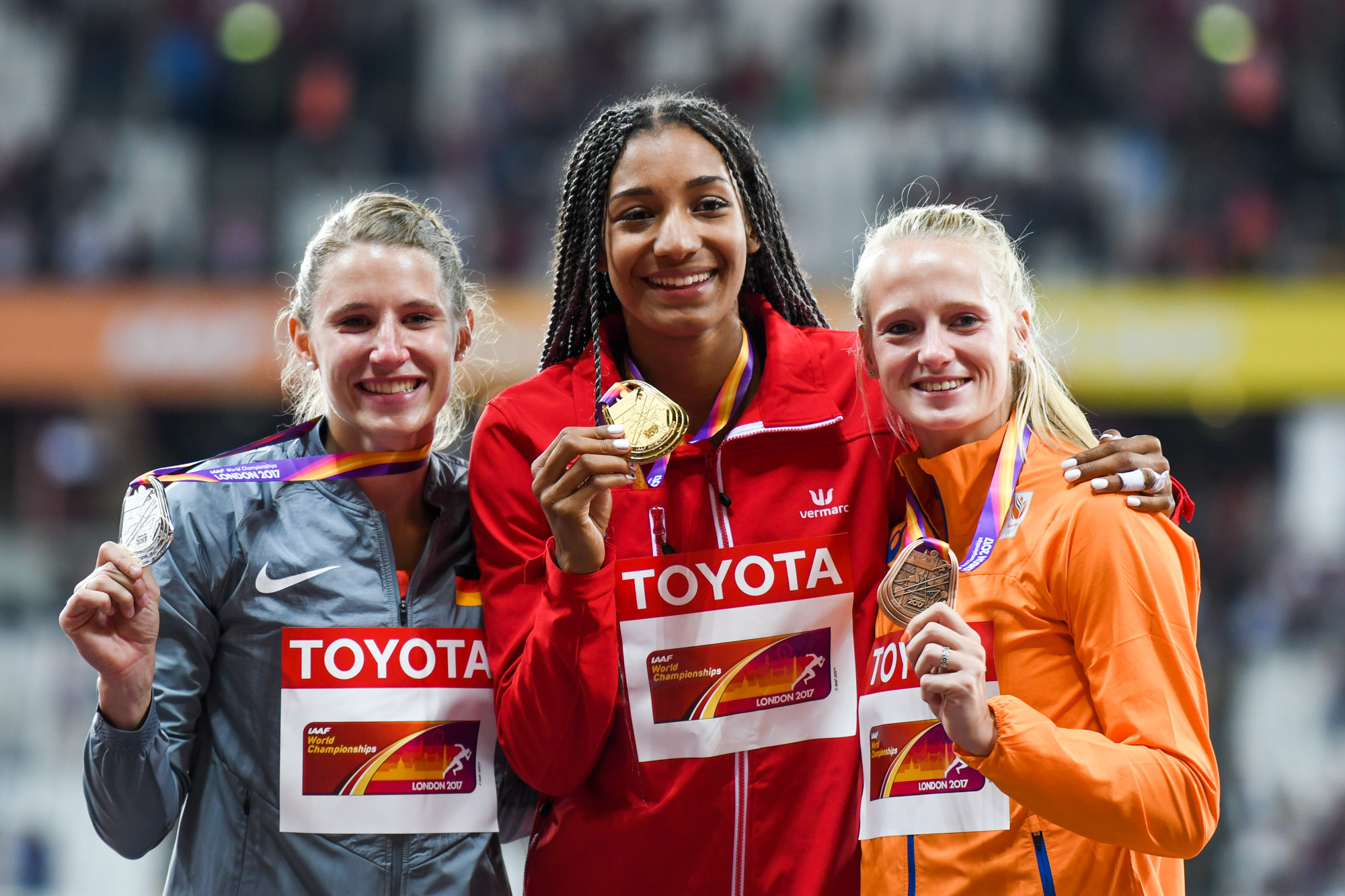
Carolin Schäfer (L) with her silver at the 2017 World Championships in Athletics in London, her greatest sports achievement; Nafi Thiam (C), Anouk Vetter (R).

=== Personal bests ===
- Heptathlon – 6836 pts (Götzis 2017)
  - 100 m hurdles – 13.07 s (+2.0 m/s, Ratingen 2017)
  - High jump – 1.86 m (Götzis 2017)
  - Shot put – 14.84 m (London 2017)
  - 200 metres – 23.27 s (+0.3 m/s, Ratingen 2017)
  - Long jump – 6.57 m (+0.9 m/s, Götzis 2017)
  - Javelin throw – 54.10 m (Tokyo 2021)
  - 800 metres – 2:13.95 min (Ratingen 2022)

Indoors

- Pentathlon – 4098 pts (Hamburg 2009)
  - 60 m hurdles – 8.35 s (Sindelfingen 2023)
  - High jump – 1.79 m (Hanau 2015)
  - Shot put – 14.24 m (Frankfurt 2016)
  - Long jump – 6.12 m (Frankfurt 2017)
  - 800 metres – 2:16.61 min (Frankfurt-Kalbach 2014)
- 60 metres – 7.72 s (Ludwigshafen 2023)

=== Circuit wins and titles, National titles ===
- World Athletics Combined Events Tour Overall winner: 2016, 2017, 2018
  - 2014: Décastar
  - 2017: Mehrkampf-Meeting
  - 2018: Mehrkampf-Meeting, Décastar
- German Athletics Championships
  - Heptathlon: 2013, 2020
