= Olga Kurban =

Russian heptathlete

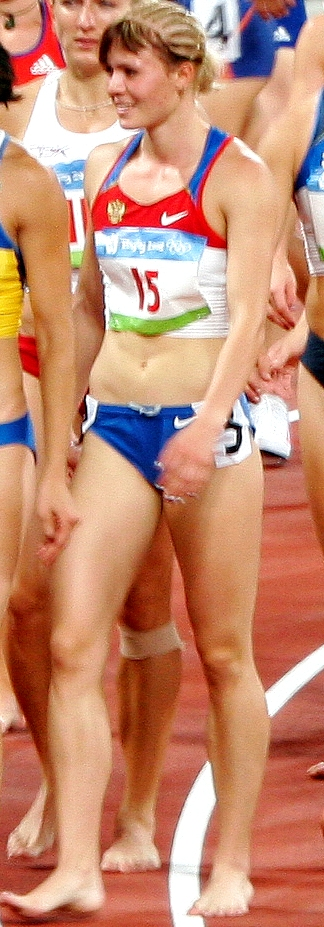
- Olga Kurban at the 2008 Summer Olympics.

Personal information
- Born: December 16, 1987 (age 37)
- Height: 1.73 m (5 ft 8 in)
- Weight: 63 kg (139 lb)

Sport
- Country: Russia
- Sport: Women's athletics
- Event: Heptathlon
- Updated on 4 August 2012

Olga Ivanovna Kurban (Russian: Ольга Ивановна Курбан; born December 16, 1987, in Irkutsk) is a female heptathlete from Russia, who competed for her native country at the 2008 Summer Olympics, and the 2012 Summer Olympics in London. She also competed at the 2007 World Athletics Championships.

== International competitions ==
Representing Russia
Year	Competition	Venue	Position	Event	Result	Notes
2007	World Championships	Osaka, Japan	19th	Heptathlon	5998 pts	
2008	Olympic Games	Beijing, China	13th	Heptathlon	6192 pts	
2009	European Indoor Championships	Turin, Italy	4th	Pentathlon	4576 pts	
2009	European U23 Championships	Kaunas, Lithuania	2nd	Heptathlon	6205 pts	
2011	Summer Universiade	Shenzhen, China	1st	Heptathlon	6151 pts	

== Professional competitions ==
Year	Competition	Venue	Position	Event	Result	Notes
2008	Hypo-Meeting	Götzis, Austria	5th	Heptathlon	6343 pts	
2009	Hypo-Meeting	Götzis, Austria	–	Heptathlon	DNF	Failed to finish 800 m

== See also ==
- List of people from Irkutsk
