= Aleksandra Butvina =

Russian heptathlete

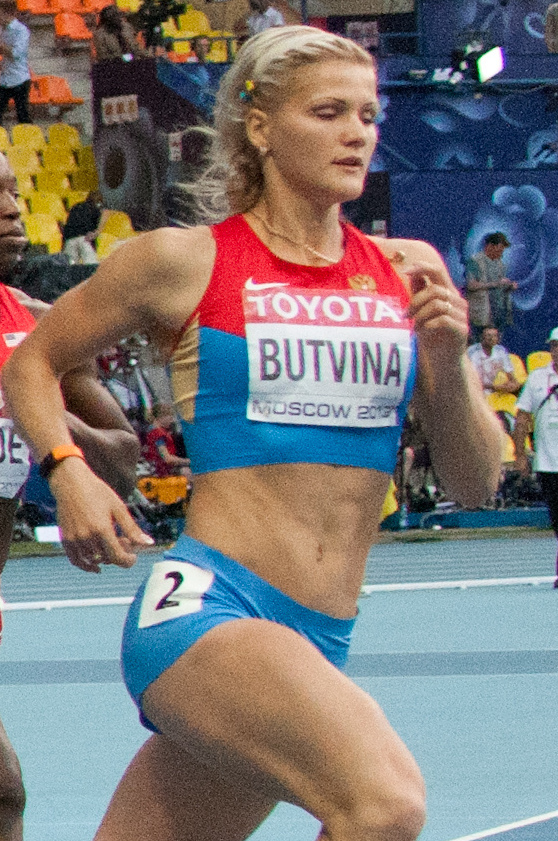

Personal information
- Nationality: Russian
- Born: 14 February 1986 (age 40)

Sport
- Country: Russia
- Sport: Women's Athletics
- Event: Heptathlon

Achievements and titles
- Personal best: Heptathlon: 6110 pt (2012)

Aleksandra Butvina (born 14 February 1986) is a Russian female heptathlete, which participated at the 2013 World Championships in Athletics.

== International competitions ==
Representing Russia
| Year | Competition | Venue | Position | Event | Result | Notes |
|---|---|---|---|---|---|---|
| 2011 | Universiade | Shenzhen, China | 7th | Heptathlon | 5703 pts | |
| 2013 | European Cup Combined Events | Tallinn, Estonia | 7th | Heptathlon | 5979 pts | |
| 2013 | World Championships | Moscow, Russia | 26th | Heptathlon | 5809 pts | |
| 2015 | European Indoor Championships | Prague, Czech Republic | 10th | Pentathlon | 4518 pts | SB |
