= 2009 European Athletics U23 Championships – Women's heptathlon =

The women's heptathlon event at the 2009 European Athletics U23 Championships was held in Kaunas, Lithuania, at S. Dariaus ir S. Girėno stadionas (Darius and Girėnas Stadium) on 18 and 19 July.

== Medalists ==
Gold	Aiga Grabuste; Latvia
Silver	Olga Kurban; Russia
Bronze	Nadezhda Sergeeva; Russia

== Results ==
=== Final ===
18-19 July

The highest mark recorded in each event is highlighted in yellow

Rank	Name	Nationality	100m H	HJ	SP	200m	LJ	JT	800m	Points	Notes
1st place, gold medalist(s)	Aiga Grabuste	Latvia	13.66 (w: -0.2 m/s)	1.77	14.56	24.73 (w: -1.7 m/s)	6.62 w (w: 2.1 m/s)	46.11	2:17.74	6396	CR
2nd place, silver medalist(s)	Olga Kurban	Russia	13.63 (w: -0.2 m/s)	1.80	13.76	24.57 (w: -0.3 m/s)	6.30 w (w: 3.4 m/s)	40.09	2:16.01	6205	
3rd place, bronze medalist(s)	Nadezhda Sergeeva	Russia	14.04 (w: -0.2 m/s)	1.80	14.32	25.50 (w: -1.7 m/s)	6.52 w (w: 2.6 m/s)	37.63	2:16.24	6118	
4	Eliška Klučinová	Czech Republic	14.33 (w: 0.9 m/s)	1.80	13.47	25.24 (w: -1.7 m/s)	6.29 w (w: 4.0 m/s)	44.67	2:22.94	6015	
5	Yana Maksimava	Belarus	14.39 (w: -0.2 m/s)	1.83	13.86	26.03 (w: -0.3 m/s)	6.09 W (w: 5.3 m/s)	40.39	2:17.90	5924	
6	Yana Panteleyeva	Russia	14.42 (w: 0.9 m/s)	1.80	12.43	25.72 (w: -0.3 m/s)	6.05 (w: 1.1 m/s)	45.21	2:16.33	5917	
7	Ida Marcussen	Norway	14.34 (w: -0.2 m/s)	1.62	13.29	25.49 (w: -0.3 m/s)	6.21 W (w: 4.1 m/s)	46.42	2:14.67	5882	
8	Yasmina Omrani	France	13.91 (w: -0.2 m/s)	1.74	13.14	24.66 (w: -1.7 m/s)	6.31 W (w: 5.4 m/s)	35.28	2:22.19	5866	
9	Iryna Ilkevych	Ukraine	14.00 (w: -0.2 m/s)	1.77	11.52	24.71 (w: -1.7 m/s)	6.06 (w: 0.7 m/s)	31.13	2:14.80	5724	
10	Maiju Mattila	Finland	14.56 (w: 0.9 m/s)	1.74	12.64	25.98 (w: -0.3 m/s)	5.75 w (w: 3.1 m/s)	46.96	2:27.41	5608	
11	Bárbara Hernando	Spain	13.91 (w: -0.2 m/s)	1.65	11.98	25.66 (w: -0.3 m/s)	5.74 w (w: 3.3 m/s)	38.07	2:13.83	5583	
12	Ellinore Hallin	Sweden	14.32 (w: 0.9 m/s)	1.74	12.90	25.72 (w: -0.3 m/s)	5.76 w (w: 3.8 m/s)	39.43	2:24.67	5574	
13	Amanda Spiljard	Netherlands	14.95 (w: 0.9 m/s)	1.68	12.23	25.10 (w: -1.7 m/s)	5.87 w (w: 3.5 m/s)	39.34	2:19.25	5531	
	Grit Šadeiko	Estonia	13.73 (w: 0.9 m/s)	1.71	10.86	24.75 (w: -1.7 m/s)	6.00 (w: 2.0 m/s)	DNS		DNF	
	Orsolya Vörös	Hungary	DNF	DNS						DNF	

== Participation ==
According to an unofficial count, 15 athletes from 13 countries participated in the event.

- Belarus (1)
- Czech Republic (1)
- Estonia (1)
- Finland (1)
- France (1)
- Hungary (1)
- Latvia (1)
- Netherlands (1)
- Norway (1)
- Russia (3)
- Spain (1)
- Sweden (1)
- Ukraine (1)
