= Alina Fyodorova =

Ukrainian athletics competitor

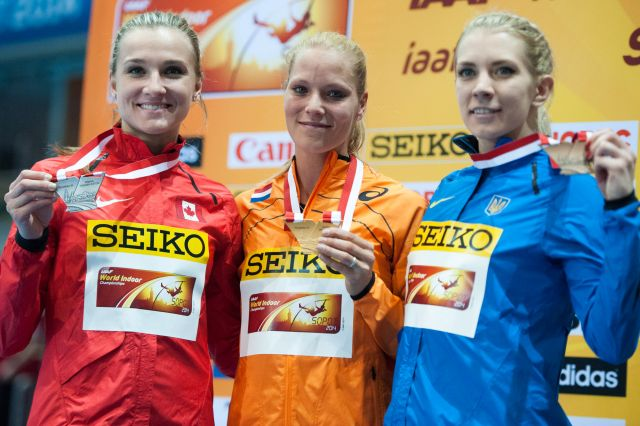
- Alina Fyodorova (right) during 2014 IAAF World Indoor Championships

Personal information
- Nationality: Ukrainian
- Born: 31 July 1989 (age 36) Kniazhychi, Kiev Oblast, Ukrainian SSR, Soviet Union
- Height: 1.75 m (5 ft 9 in)
- Weight: 70 kg (154 lb)

Sport
- Country: Ukraine
- Sport: Track and field
- Event: Heptathlon

Achievements and titles
- Personal best: Heptathlon: 6278 points (2015)
Medal record
World Indoor Championships
Silver medal – second place	2016 Portland	Pentathlon
Bronze medal – third place	2014 Sopot	Pentathlon

Alina Fyodorova (Ukrainian: Аліна Федорова; born 31 July 1989) is a former Ukrainian athlete competing in heptathlon and women's pentathlon.

In 2018 Fyodorova was issued with a four-year competition ban backdated to July 2016 for an anti-doping rule violation after testing positive a banned substance Consequently, her results from the 2016 Olympic Games in the heptathlon were disqualified.

== Competition record ==
Year	Competition	Venue	Position	Event	Notes
Representing Ukraine
2007	European Junior Championships	Kaunas, Lithuania	–	Heptathlon	DNF
2008	World Junior Championships	Bydgoszcz, Poland	18th	Heptathlon	5165 pts
2011	European U23 Championships	Ostrava, Czech Republic	6th	Heptathlon	5896 pts
2011	World Championships	Daegu, South Korea	21st	Heptathlon	5908 pts
2012	European Championships	Helsinki, Finland	13th	Heptathlon	5959 pts
2013	European Indoor Championships	Gothenburg, Sweden	8th	Pentathlon	4420 pts
2014	World Indoor Championships	Sopot, Poland	3rd	Pentathlon	4724 pts
2014	European Championships	Zürich, Switzerland	–	Heptathlon	DNF
2015	European Indoor Championships	Prague, Czech Republic	7th	Pentathlon	4563 pts
2015	World Championships	Beijing, China	17th	Heptathlon	5978 pts
2016	World Indoor Championships	Portland, United States	2nd	Pentathlon	4770 pts (PB)
2016	Olympic Games	Rio de Janeiro, Brazil	DQ	Heptathlon	~~5038 pts~~
