= Kateřina Cachová =

Czech heptathlete

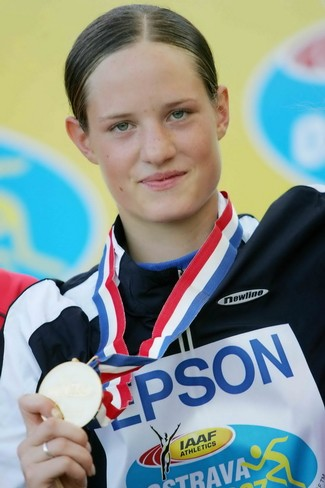
- Cachová with her gold medal from the 2007 World Youth Championships in Athletics

Personal information
- Born: 26 February 1990 (age 36) Ostrava, Czechoslovakia
- Height: 1.73 m (5 ft 8 in)
- Weight: 63 kg (139 lb)
- Website: katerinacachova.cz

Sport
- Country: Czech Republic
- Sport: Athletics
- Event: Heptathlon

Achievements and titles
- World finals: 21st at the 2011 World Championships in Athletics
- Regional finals: 17th at the 2010 European Athletics Championships
- Personal bests: 200 m: 24.10 (May 2016); 800 m: 2:12.38 (May 2017); 100 m hurdles: 13.05 (June 2016); High jump: 1.85 (July 2010); Long jump: 6.40 (June 2008); Shot put: 13.32 (September 2018); Javelin: 47.36 (July 2019); Heptathlon: 6400 points (August 2018)
Medal record
Heptathlon
World Youth Championships
Gold medal – first place	2007 Ostrava
European U23 Championships
Silver medal – second place	2011 Ostrava
European Junior Championships
Silver medal – second place	2009 Novi Sad
Universiade
Bronze medal – third place	2011 Shenzhen

Kateřina Cachová (Czech pronunciation: [ˈkatɛr̝ɪna ˈtsaxovaː]; born 26 February 1990) is a Czech athlete who specialises in the heptathlon.

Cachová represented the Czech Republic at the 2010 European Championships in Athletics where she finished 17th in the heptathlon, scoring a personal best of 5911 points.

At the 2011 European Athletics U23 Championships in Ostrava, Cachová won the silver medal with a new personal best record of 6123 points.

== Achievements ==
Year	Competition	Venue	Position	Event	Notes
Representing the Czech Republic
2005	World Youth Championships	Marrakesh, Morocco	11th	Heptathlon	5148
2006	World Junior Championships	Beijing, China	15th	Heptathlon	5170 pts
2007	World Youth Championships	Ostrava, Czech Republic	1st	Heptathlon	5641, WYL
2009	European Junior Championships	Novi Sad, Serbia	2nd	Heptathlon	5660, SB
2010	European Cup Combined Events – Super League	Tallinn, Estonia	7th	Heptathlon	5908
2010	European Championships	Barcelona, Spain	17th	Heptathlon	5911 pts, PB
2011	TNT – Fortuna Meeting	Kladno, Czech Republic	4th	Heptathlon	5897
2011	European U23 Championships	Ostrava, Czech Republic	2nd	Heptathlon	6123 pts, PB
2011	Summer Universiade	Shenzhen, China	3rd	Heptathlon	5873 pts
2011	World Championships	Daegu, South Korea	21st	Heptathlon	5908 pts
2012	TNT – Fortuna Meeting	Kladno, Czech Republic	—N/a	Heptathlon	DNF
2017	World Championships	London, United Kingdom	15th	Heptathlon	6070 pts
2018	World Indoor Championships	Birmingham, United Kingdom	11th	Pentathlon	4282 pts
2018	European Championships	Berlin, Germany	6th	Heptathlon	6400 pts
2019	World Championships	Doha, Qatar	16th	Heptathlon	5987 pts
