= Antoinette Nana Djimou =

French heptathlete and pentathlete

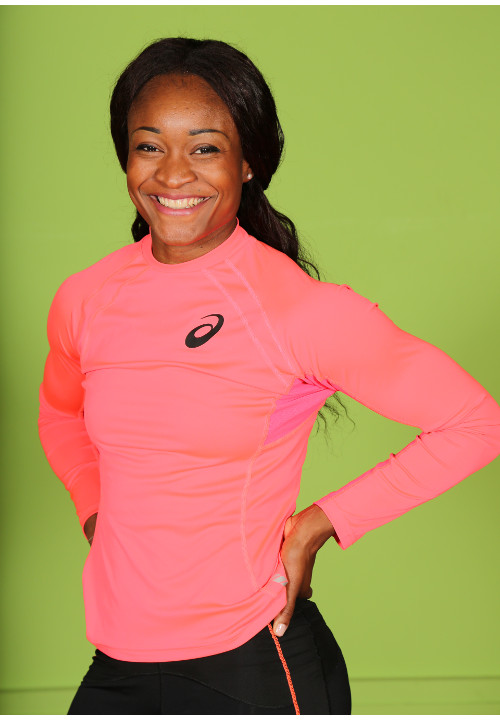
- Antoinette Nana Djimou in 2014

Personal information
- Full name: Antoinette Nana Djimou Ida
- Nationality: Cameroonian; French (since 2003)
- Born: 2 August 1985 (age 41) Douala, Cameroon
- Height: 1.77 m (5 ft 10 in)
- Weight: 65 kg (143 lb)

Sport
- Country: France
- Sport: Track and field
- Events: Heptathlon, Pentathlon
- Coached by: Sébastien Levicq
Medal record
European Championships
Gold medal – first place	2012 Helsinki	Heptathlon
Gold medal – first place	2014 Zürich	Heptathlon
Silver medal – second place	2016 Amsterdam	Heptathlon
European Indoor Championships
Gold medal – first place	2011 Paris	Pentathlon
Gold medal – first place	2013 Gothenburg	Pentathlon
Bronze medal – third place	2009 Turin	Pentathlon

Antoinette Nana Djimou Ida (born 2 August 1985 in Douala, Cameroon) is a Cameroonian-French heptathlete and pentathlete. She has won two European Athletics Championships heptathlon gold medals (in 2012 and 2014) and two European Athletics Indoor Championships pentathlon gold medals (in 2011 and 2013). Her heptathlon personal best result is 6576 points, achieved at the 2012 Olympics in London.

She acquired French nationality by naturalization on 28 August 2003.

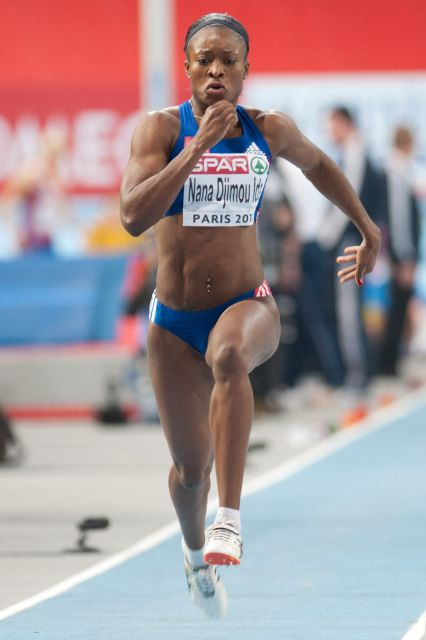
Jumping to victory in Paris, 2011

== Career ==
Nana Djimou finished 4th at the 2012 Olympics heptathlon in London, with a personal best of 6576 points.

Nana Djimou withdrew from the upcoming 2015 World Championships in Athletics after undergoing an operation in June 2015.

== Personal bests ==
Outdoor

- 100 m: 11.78 (2008)
- 200 m: 24.36 (2011)
- 800 m: 2:15.22 (2014)
- 100 m hs: 12.96 (2012)
- High jump: 1.83 m (2011)
- Long jump: 6.43 m (2016)
- Shot put: 16.17 m (2016)
- Javelin throw: 57.27 m (2012)
- Heptathlon: 6,576 (2012)

Indoor

- 60 m: 7.59 (2008)
- 800 m: 2:18.09 (2011)
- 60 m hs: 8.11 (2010 and 2011)
- High jump: 1.84 m (2010)
- Long jump: 6.44 m (2009)
- Shot put: 15.52 m (2018)
- Pentathlon: 4723 pts (2011)

== Meetings ==
- 2006 Hypo-Meeting: 19th, 5700 pts
- 2007 Hypo-Meeting: 21st, 5749 pts
- 2008 Hypo-Meeting: 12th, 6189 pts
- 2010 Hypo-Meeting: 10th, 5994 pts
- 2011 Hypo-Meeting: 3rd, 6409 pts
- 2012 Hypo-Meeting: 12th, 6279 pts
- 2012 Décastar: 2nd, 6390 pts
- 2013 Hypo-Meeting: 10th, 6058 pts

== International competitions ==
Year	Competition	Venue	Position	Event	Notes
Representing France
2004	World Junior Championships	Grosseto, Italy	4th	Heptathlon	5649 pts
2005	European U23 Championships	Erfurt, Germany	5th	Heptathlon	5792 pts
2006	European Championships	Gothenburg, Sweden	21st	Heptathlon	5765 pts
2007	European Indoor Championships	Birmingham, United Kingdom	11th	Pentathlon	4355 pts
2007	European U23 Championships	Debrecen, Hungary	7th	Heptathlon	5970 pts
2007	World Championships	Osaka, Japan	—	Heptathlon	DNF
2008	Olympic Games	Beijing, PR China	17th	Heptathlon	6055 pts
2009	European Indoor Championships	Turin, Italy	3rd	Pentathlon	4618 pts
2009	World Championships	Berlin, Germany	7th	Heptathlon	6323 pts
2010	World Indoor Championships	Doha, Qatar	4th	Pentathlon	4618 pts
2010	European Championships	Barcelona, Spain	—	Heptathlon	DNF
2011	European Indoor Championships	Paris, France	1st	Pentathlon	4723 pts
2011	World Championships	Daegu, South Korea	7th	Heptathlon	6309 pts
2012	European Championships	Helsinki, Finland	1st	Heptathlon	6544 pts
2012	Olympic Games	London, United Kingdom	4th	Heptathlon	6576 pts
2013	European Indoor Championships	Gothenburg, Sweden	1st	Pentathlon	4666 pts
2013	World Championships	Moscow, Russia	8th	Heptathlon	6326 pts
2014	European Championships	Zürich, Switzerland	1st	Heptathlon	6551 pts
2015	European Indoor Championships	Prague, Czech Republic	5th	Pentathlon	4591 pts
2016	European Championships	Amsterdam, The Netherlands	2nd	Heptathlon	6458 pts
2016	Olympic Games	Rio de Janeiro, Brazil	11th	Heptathlon	6383 pts
2017	World Championships	London, United Kingdom	16th	Heptathlon	6064 pts
2018	World Indoor Championships	Birmingham, United Kingdom	12th	Pentathlon	3705 pts
