= Grit Šadeiko =

Estonian heptathlete (born 1989)

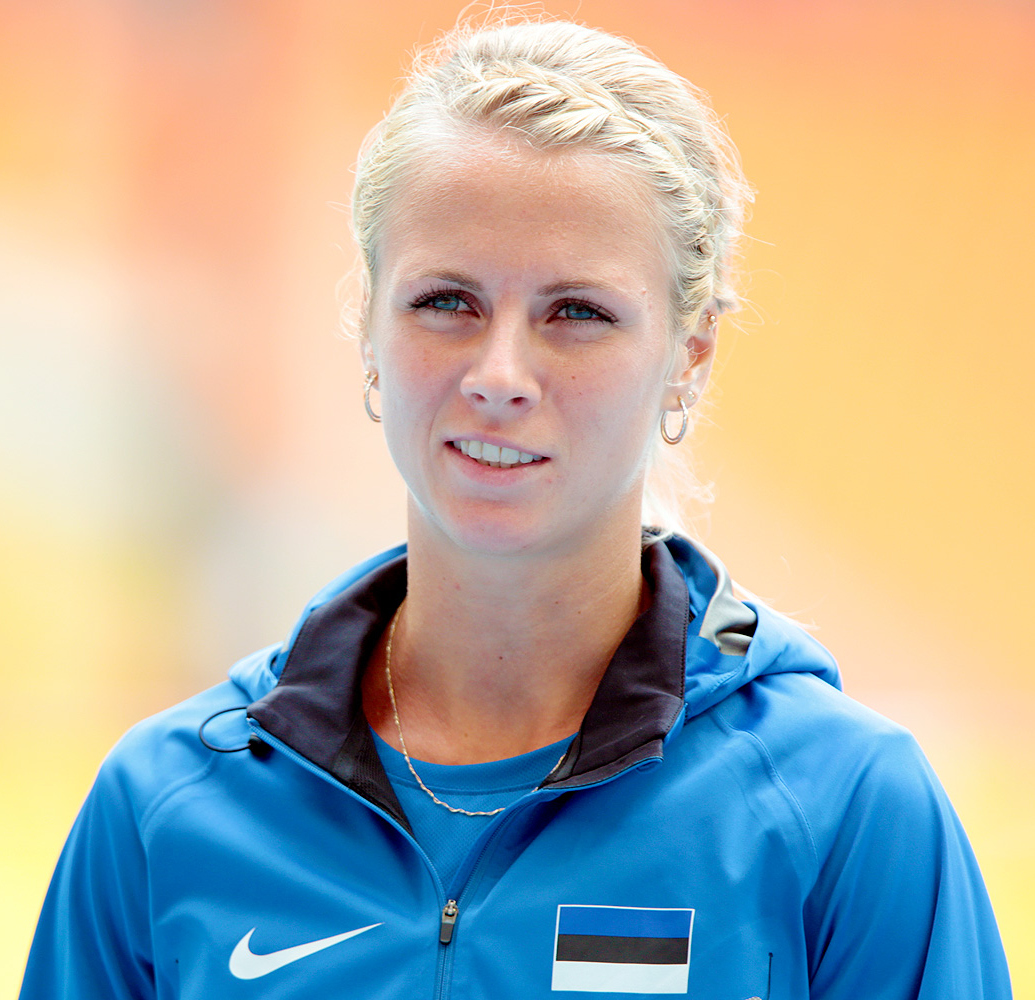
- Šadeiko at the 2013 World Championships in Athletics

Personal information
- Full name: Grit Šadeiko
- Born: 29 July 1989 (age 36) Saku, Estonia
- Height: 1.72 m (5 ft 8 in)
- Weight: 62 kg (137 lb)

Sport
- Country: Estonia
- Sport: Track and field
- Event(s): Heptathlon, pentathlon

Achievements and titles
- Personal best(s): Heptathlon: 6,280 (NR); Pentathlon: 4,422
Medal record
Women's athletics
Representing Estonia
World Junior Championships
Bronze medal – third place	2008 Bydgoszcz	Heptathlon
European U23 Championships
Gold medal – first place	2011 Ostrava	Heptathlon

Grit Šadeiko (born 29 July 1989) is an Estonian heptathlete. She won the heptathlon at the 2011 European Athletics U23 Championships.

== Personal life ==
Šadeiko's younger sister Grete is also a heptathlete.

== Major competition record ==
Year	Competition	Venue	Position	Event	Result
Representing Estonia
2008	World Junior Championships	Bydgoszcz, Poland	3rd	Heptathlon	5765
2009	European U23 Championships	Kaunas, Lithuania	–	Heptathlon	DNF
2010	European Championships	Barcelona, Spain	19th	Heptathlon	5761
2011	European Indoor Championships	Paris, France	9th	Pentathlon	4358
2011	European Athletics U23 Championships	Ostrava, Czech Republic	1st	Heptathlon	6134
2011	World Championships	Daegu, South Korea	–	Heptathlon	DNF
2012	European Championships	Helsinki, Finland	–	Heptathlon	DNF
2012	Olympic Games	London, United Kingdom	23rd	Heptathlon	6013
2013	World Championships	Moscow, Russia	–	Heptathlon	DNF
2014	European Championships	Zürich, Switzerland	15th	Heptathlon	6014
2015	World Championships	Beijing, China	15th	Heptathlon	6213
2016	European Championships	Amsterdam, Netherlands	–	Heptathlon	DNF
2016	Olympic Games	Rio de Janeiro, Brazil	–	Heptathlon	DNF
2017	World Championships	London, United Kingdom	13th	Heptathlon	6094
2018	European Championships	Berlin, Germany	12th	Heptathlon	6060

Awards
Preceded by Kaisa Pajusalu	Estonian Young Athlete of the Year; 2011	Succeeded by Anett Kontaveit
