= Ellen Sprunger =

Swiss athlete

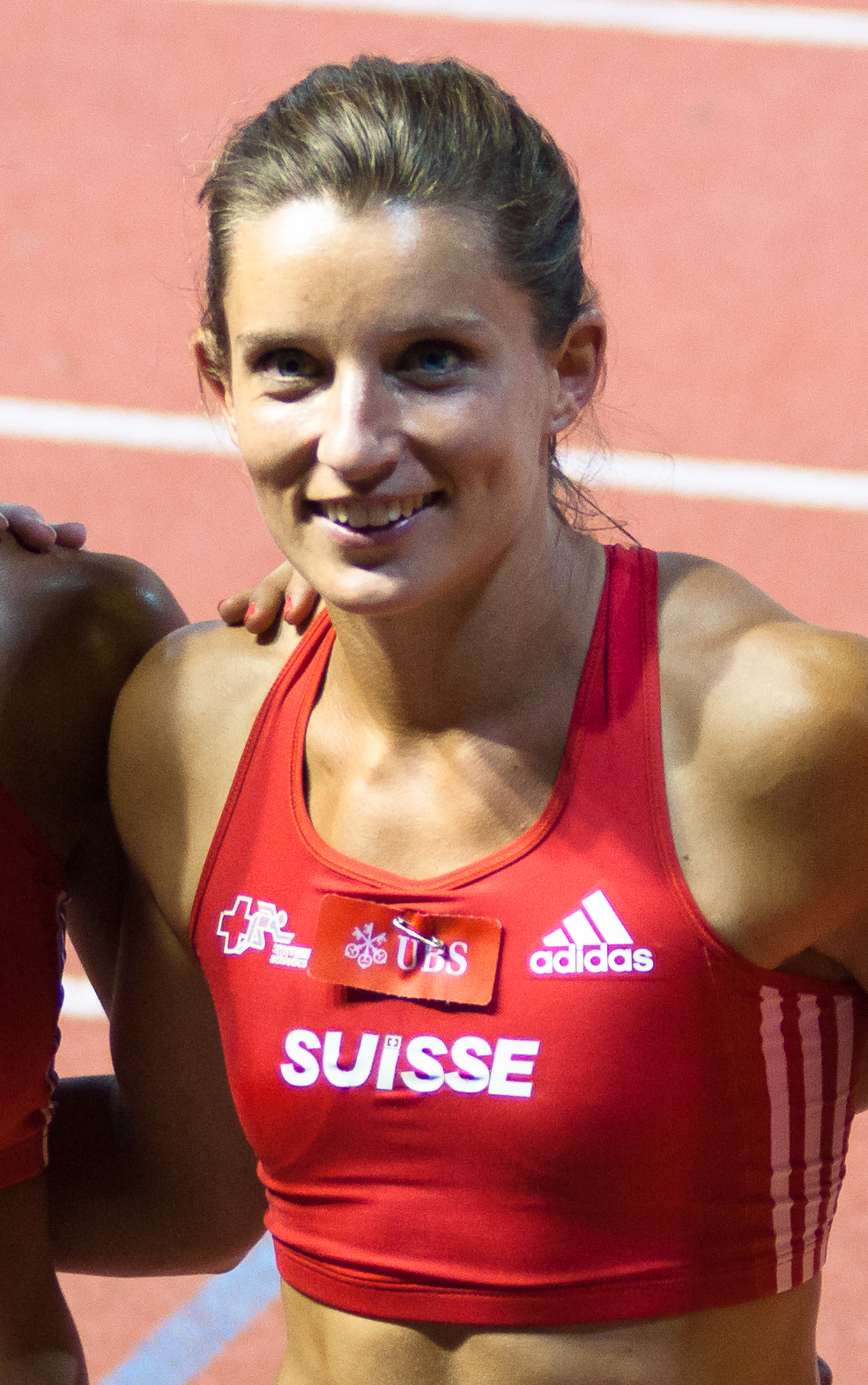

Personal information
- Born: Nyon, Canton de Vaud, Switzerland
- Height: 1.73 m (5 ft 8 in)
- Weight: 61 kg (134 lb)

Sport
- Country: Switzerland
- Sport: Athletics
- Events: Heptathlon; 4×100 m relay
- Coached by: Laurent Meuwly
- Updated on 5 August 2012

Ellen Sprunger (born 5 August 1986, Nyon) is a retired Swiss track and field athlete spealizing in the heptathlon.

Sprunger competed at the 2012 Summer Olympics in the women's heptathlon event in which she finished 18th. She was also part of the Swiss 4 × 100 m team at the event. Her sister Lea was also a member of the Swiss team.

== Personal bests ==
100 metres: 11.52 w. 1.5 (2013)
200 metres: 23.21 w. 0.2 (2016)
800 metres: 2:12.93 (2014)
100 metres hurdles: 13.35 w. 2.0 (2012)
High jump: 1.73 (2014)
Long jump: 6.16 w. 0.9 (2013)
Shot put: 13.42 (2014)
Javelin throw: 46.83 (2012)
Heptathlon: 6124 (2012)
