= Katsiaryna Netsviatayeva =

Belarusian athlete

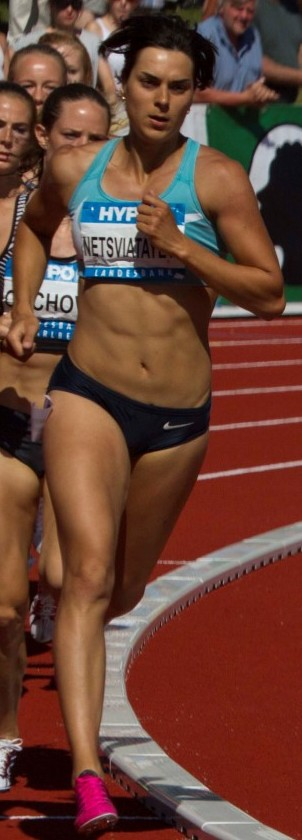

Personal information
- Nationality: Belarusian
- Born: 28 June 1989 (age 36)

Sport
- Country: Belarus
- Sport: Track and field
- Event: Heptathlon

Katsiaryna Netsviatayeva (born 28 June 1989) is a Belarusian athlete who specialises in the heptathlon. She competed in the heptathlon event at the 2016 European Championships in Amsterdam, Netherlands.

== Personal bests ==
=== Outdoor ===
| Discipline | Performance | Wind | Place | Date |
|---|---|---|---|---|
| 200 metres | 24.58 | -1.7 | Grodno | 6 July 2012 |
| 800 metres | 2:11.01 | | Zürich | 15 August 2014 |
| 100 metres hurdles | 13.67 | -0.7 | Talence | 20 September 2014 |
| 100 metres hurdles | 13.67 | +0.6 | Zürich | 14 August 2014 |
| High jump | 1.79 | | Kladno | 10 June 2016 |
| Long jump | 5.94 | +1.9 | Grodno | 25 June 2016 |
| Shot put | 15.32 | | Talence | 20 September 2014 |
| Javelin throw | 44.90 | | Grodno | 7 July 2012 |
| Heptathlon | 6121 | | Grodno | 25 July 2014 |

=== Indoor ===
| Discipline | Performance | Place | Date |
|---|---|---|---|
| 800 metres | 2:14.10 | Gomel | 6 February 2015 |
| 60 metres hurdles | 8.55 | Prague | 6 March 2015 |
| 60 metres hurdles | 8.55 | Gomel | 15 February 2013 |
| High jump | 1.77 | Gomel | 6 February 2015 |
| Long jump | 6.04 | Gomel | 18 February 2012 |
| Shot put | 14.97 | Prague | 6 March 2015 |
| Pentathlon | 4489 | Gomel | 6 February 2015 |
