= TNT – Fortuna Meeting =

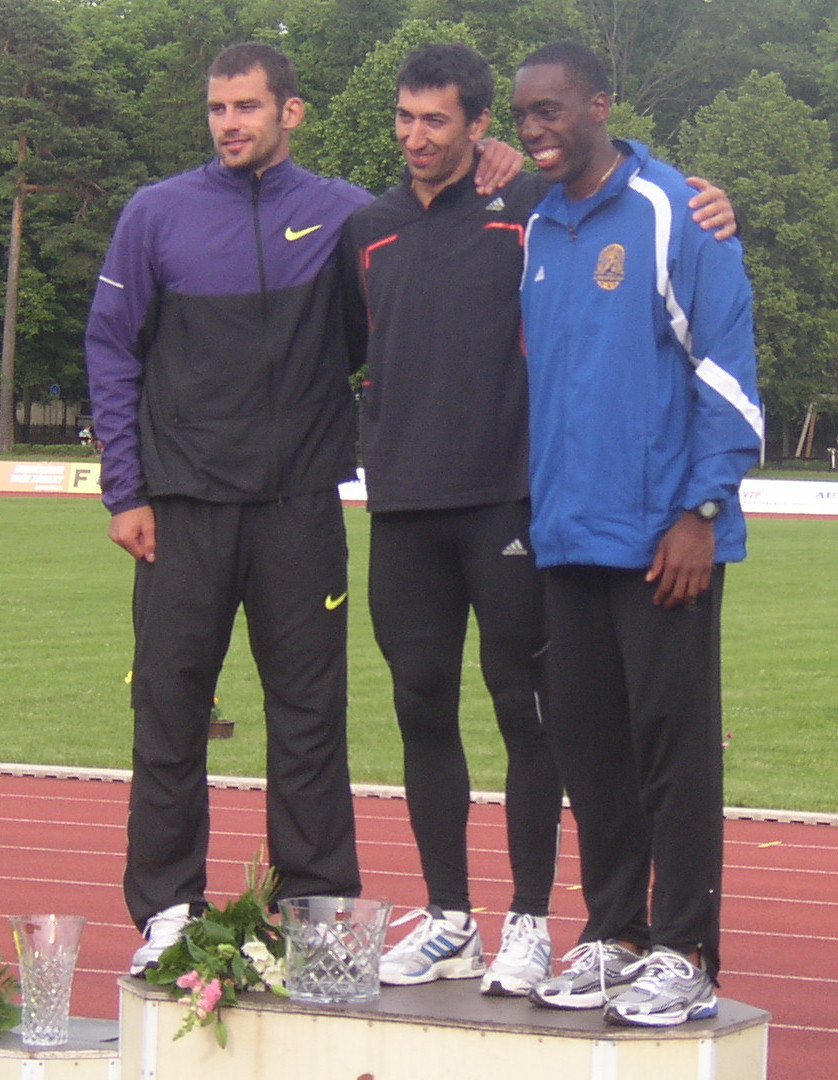
The men's decathlon podium at the 2010 edition

The TNT – Fortuna Meeting is an annual track and field combined events meeting which takes place at Sletiště Stadium in Kladno, Czech Republic in mid-June. The event, which features a men's decathlon and a women's heptathlon, attracted an audience of 5000 in its inaugural edition in 2007 and saw world record holder Roman Šebrle win the men's competition with a total of 8697 points – the best decathlon performance that year. In 2010 the meeting was given IAAF World Combined Events Challenge status by the International Association of Athletics Federations.

The meeting director is Zdeněk Lubenský, a former Czech pole vaulter. A junior decathlon competition was introduced in 2010 and it was won by Czech athlete Adam Sebastian Helcelet.

It was renamed to TNT Express Meeting in 2013, and was last held in 2017.

== Editions ==
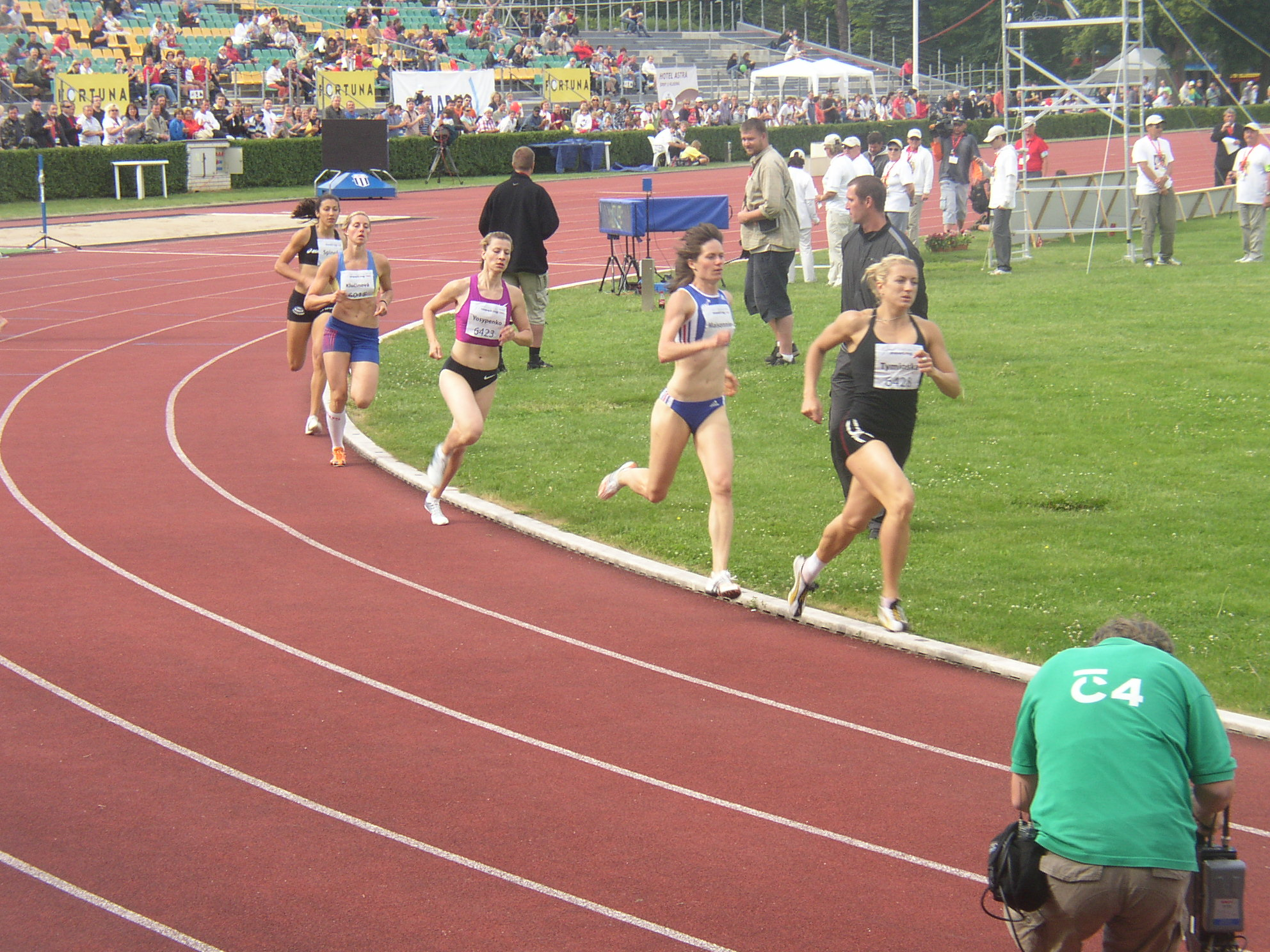
The women's 800 metres event in Kladno in 2010

Edition	Year	Dates	Athletes	Ref.
1st	2007	19–20 June		
2nd	2008	18–19 June	23 Men / 16 Women	
3rd	2009	23–24 June	20 Men / 13 Women	
4th	2010	15–16 June	27 Men / 18 Women	
5th	2011	15–16 June	28 Men / 16 Women	
6th	2012	9–10 June	25 Men / 28 Women	
7th	2013	8–9 June	15 Men / 14 Women	
8th	2014	14–15 June	18 Men / 17 Women	
9th	2015	12–13 June	17 Men / 21 Women	
10th	2016	10–11 June	15 Men / 20 Women	
11th	2017	17–18 June	17 Men / 20 Women	

== Records ==
Event	Athlete	Record	Date	Ref.
Men's decathlon	Roman Šebrle (CZE)	8697 points	19–20 June 2007	
100 m	Stanislav Sajdok (CZE)	10.64	18 June 2008	
Long jump	Roman Šebrle (CZE)	7.84 m	19 June 2007	
Shot put	Maurice Smith (JAM)	17.78 m	18 June 2008	
High jump	Stanislav Sajdok (CZE)	2.16 m	18 June 2008	
400 m	David Hall (GBR)	46.98	12 June 2015	
110 m hurdles	Stanislav Sajdok (CZE)	13.87	19 June 2008	
Discus throw	Maurice Smith (JAM)	53.02 m	16 June 2010	
Pole vault	Adam Pašiak (CZE)	5.10 m	16 June 2010	
Pole vault	Dmitriy Karpov (KAZ)	5.10 m	16 June 2011	
Javelin throw	Marek Lukáš (CZE)	69.17 m	9 June 2013	
1500 m	Edgars Erinš (LAT)	4:14.49	11 June 2016	
Women's heptathlon	Tatyana Chernova (RUS)	6773 points	15–16 June 2011	
100 m hurdles	Katerina Cachova (CZE)	13.16 (−0.4 m/s)	10 June 2016	
High jump	Morgan Lake (GBR)	1.91 m	10 June 2016	
Shot put	Nataliya Dobrynska (UKR)	14.97 m	23 June 2009	
200 m	Tatyana Chernova (RUS)	23.32 (+2.5 m/s)	15 June 2011	
Long jump	Aiga Grabuste (LAT)	6.65 m (±0.0 m/s)	16 June 2011	
Javelin throw	Sofia Ifadidou (GRE)	53.46 m	9 June 2013	
800 m	Karolina Tymińska (POL)	2:08.33	16 June 2011	

== Past medallists ==
Key: Meet record

=== Men ===
Year	Gold		Silver		Bronze	
2007	Roman Šebrle (CZE)	8697	Dmitriy Karpov (KAZ)	8553	Romain Barras (FRA)	8298
2008	Maurice Smith (JAM)	8434	Roman Šebrle (CZE)	8076	Roland Schwarzl (AUT)	7787
2009	Maurice Smith (JAM)	8157	Roman Šebrle (CZE)	8058	Dmitriy Karpov (KAZ)	8029
2010	Oleksiy Kasyanov (UKR)	8381	Aleksey Drozdov (RUS)	8246	Jamie Adjetey-Nelson (CAN)	8239
2011	Leonel Suárez (CUB)	8231	Hans van Alphen (BEL)	8120	Willem Coertzen (RSA)	8094
2012	Dmitriy Karpov (KAZ)	8173	Roman Šebrle (CZE)	8097	Pelle Rietveld (NED)	8073
2013	Andrei Krauchanka (BLR)	8380	Dmitriy Karpov (KAZ)	7978	Marek Lukáš (CZE)	7753
2014	Oleksiy Kasyanov (UKR)	8083	Adam Sebastian Helcelet (CZE)	7989	Eduard Mikhan (BLR)	7987
2015	Marek Lukáš (CZE)	7892	Martin Roe (NOR)	7842	Romain Martin (FRA)	7825
2016	Lars Vikan Rise (NOR)	7925	Marek Lukáš (CZE)	7903	Mikk Pahapill (EST)	7814
2017	Larbi Bourrada (ALG)	8120	Willem Coertzen (RSA)	7804	Martin Roe (NOR)	7741

=== Women ===
Year	Gold		Silver		Bronze	
2007	Lyudmyla Blonska (UKR)	6354	Karolina Tymińska (POL)	6199	Lyudmyla Yosypenko (UKR)	5875
2008	Lyudmyla Blonska (UKR)	6421	Karolina Tymińska (POL)	6215	Denisa Rosolová (CZE)	6104
2009	Nataliya Dobrynska (UKR)	6249	Yuliya Tarasova (UZB)	5916	Helga Margrét Thorsteinsdóttir (ISL)	5878
2010	Eliška Klučinová (CZE)	6268	Marina Goncharova (RUS)	6182	Lyudmyla Yosypenko (UKR)	6142
2011	Tatyana Chernova (RUS)	6773	Karolina Tymińska (POL)	6516	Aiga Grabuste (LAT)	6252
2012	Eliška Klučinová (CZE)	6283	Katarina Johnson-Thompson (GBR)	6248	Yana Maksimava (BLR)	6103
2013	Hanna Melnychenko (UKR)	6416	Karolina Tymińska (POL)	6360	Eliška Klucinová (CZE)	6190
2014	Eliška Klučinová (CZE)	6460	Katsiaryna Netsviatayeva (BLR)	5891	Lucia Mokrášová (SVK)	5769
2015	Hanna Kasyanova (UKR)	6277	Eliška Klucinová (CZE)	6148	Karolina Tymińska (POL)	6048
2016	Katerina Cachová (CZE)	6328	Yana Maksimava (BLR)	6076	Karolina Tymińska (POL)	6075
2017	Katerina Cachová (CZE)	6337	Eliška Klucinová (CZE)	6285	Marthe Koala (BUR)	6230
