= 2011 European Athletics Indoor Championships – Women's pentathlon =

The Women's pentathlon event at the 2011 European Athletics Indoor Championships was held at March 4.

== Records ==
Standing records prior to the 2011 European Athletics Indoor Championships
World record	Irina Belova (CIS)	4991	Berlin, Germany	15 February 1992
European record	Irina Belova (CIS)	4991	Berlin, Germany	15 February 1992
Championship record	Carolina Klüft (SWE)	4948	Madrid, Spain	5 March 2005
World Leading	Austra Skujytė (LTU)	4578	Klaipėda, Lithuania	19 February 2011
European Leading	Austra Skujytė (LTU)	4578	Klaipėda, Lithuania	19 February 2011

== Results ==
=== 60 m hurdles ===
The heats were held at 9:00.

Rank	Heat	Lane	Name	Nationality	Time	Points	Notes
1	2	6	Antoinette Nana Djimou Ida	France	8.11	1104	=PB
2	2	8	Zuzana Hejnová	Czech Republic	8.25	1073	PB
3	2	4	Sara Aerts	Belgium	8.28	1066	PB
4	2	3	Grit Šadeiko	Estonia	8.32	1057	
5	2	7	Karolina Tymińska	Poland	8.34	1052	=PB
6	1	6	Marina Goncharova	Russia	8.52	1013	PB
7	2	5	Bárbara Hernando	Spain	8.59	997	
8	1	5	Austra Skujytė	Lithuania	8.60	995	PB
9	1	3	Kaie Kand	Estonia	8.62	991	SB
10	1	4	Jessica Samuelsson	Sweden	8.63	989	SB
11	2	1	Remona Fransen	Netherlands	8.64	987	PB
12	2	2	Aiga Grabuste	Latvia	8.68	978	
13	1	2	Ida Marcussen	Norway	8.72	969	SB
14	1	8	Yana Panteleyeva	Russia	8.84	944	
	1	7	Eliška Klučinová	Czech Republic	DNS		

=== High jump ===
The event was held at 9:55.

Rank	Athlete	Nationality	1.56	1.59	1.62	1.65	1.68	1.71	1.74	1.77	1.80	1.83	1.86	1.89	1.92	1.95	Result	Points	Notes	Total
1	Remona Fransen	Netherlands	–	–	–	–	–	–	o	o	o	xo	xo	xxo	o	xxx	1.92	1132	NR	2119
2	Austra Skujytė	Lithuania	–	–	–	–	–	o	o	o	o	o	xxx				1.83	1016		2011
3	Antoinette Nana Djimou Ida	France	–	–	–	–	o	–	xo	o	o	xxx					1.80	978	SB	2082
4	Zuzana Hejnová	Czech Republic	–	–	o	o	o	o	o	o	xxo	xxx					1.80	978	PB	2051
5	Marina Goncharova	Russia	–	–	o	o	o	xo	o	xo	xxx						1.77	941	SB	1954
6	Grit Šadeiko	Estonia	–	–	o	o	o	xo	xo	xo	xxx						1.77	941	=PB	1998
7	Yana Panteleyeva	Russia	–	–	o	o	o	o	o	xxo	xxx						1.77	941		1885
8	Kaie Kand	Estonia	–	–	–	–	o	o	o	xxx							1.74	903		1894
9	Sara Aerts	Belgium	–	–	o	o	o	o	xo	xxx							1.74	903	PB	1969
9	Karolina Tymińska	Poland	–	–	o	o	o	o	xo	xxx							1.74	903		1955
11	Jessica Samuelsson	Sweden	–	–	o	o	o	xo	xxo	xxx							1.74	903	PB	1892
12	Aiga Grabuste	Latvia	–	–	o	o	o	xxo	xxx								1.71	867		1845
13	Ida Marcussen	Norway	–	–	o	o	o	xxx									1.68	830	SB	1799
14	Bárbara Hernando	Spain	o	o	o	xxx											1.62	759		1756

=== Shot Put ===
The event was held at 12:15.

Rank	Athlete	Nationality	#1	#2	#3	Result	Points	Notes	Total
1	Austra Skujytė	Lithuania	16.92	X	17.53	17.53	1031	SB	3042
2	Antoinette Nana Djimou Ida	France	14.81	14.16	13.95	14.81	848	PB	2930
3	Jessica Samuelsson	Sweden	14.32	13.89	X	14.32	815		2707
4	Aiga Grabuste	Latvia	12.67	14.18	13.69	14.18	806	PB	2651
5	Remona Fransen	Netherlands	13.39	14.09	13.02	14.09	800	PB	2919
6	Karolina Tymińska	Poland	14.06	X	14.00	14.06	798		2753
7	Marina Goncharova	Russia	13.63	X	13.09	13.63	769		2723
8	Sara Aerts	Belgium	X	13.51	13.47	13.51	761	PB	2730
9	Yana Panteleyeva	Russia	13.38	X	13.21	13.38	753	SB	2638
10	Kaie Kand	Estonia	13.07	13.22	X	13.22	742	SB	2636
11	Bárbara Hernando	Spain	12.85	X	12.49	12.85	717		2473
12	Ida Marcussen	Norway	12.49	12.37	12.23	12.49	694		2493
13	Grit Šadeiko	Estonia	11.55	12.23	11.99	12.23	676		2674
14	Zuzana Hejnová	Czech Republic	11.71	X	12.11	12.11	668	PB	2719

=== Long Jump ===
The event was held at 15:45.

Rank	Athlete	Nationality	#1	#2	#3	Result	Points	Notes	Total
1	Antoinette Nana Djimou Ida	France	6.34	6.18	6.19	6.34	956	SB	3886
2	Karolina Tymińska	Poland	5.98	6.33	6.28	6.33	953	SB	3706
3	Aiga Grabuste	Latvia	6.17	6.29	6.17	6.29	940		3591
4	Austra Skujytė	Lithuania	6.15	6.22	6.25	6.25	927		3969
5	Grit Šadeiko	Estonia	6.19	6.11	6.02	6.19	908	PB	3582
6	Sara Aerts	Belgium	6.11	6.04	X	6.11	883	PB	3613
7	Marina Goncharova	Russia	5.38	5.98	6.09	6.09	877	SB	3600
8	Remona Fransen	Netherlands	5.94	X	6.07	6.07	871	PB	3790
9	Ida Marcussen	Norway	5.97	6.06	X	6.06	868	SB	3361
10	Jessica Samuelsson	Sweden	6.04	X	5.99	6.04	862	SB	3569
11	Kaie Kand	Estonia	5.97	X	5.60	5.97	840		3476
12	Yana Panteleyeva	Russia	5.85	5.60	5.77	5.85	804		3442
13	Bárbara Hernando	Spain	5.24	5.68	5.75	5.75	774		3247
14	Zuzana Hejnová	Czech Republic	X	X	5.73	5.73	768		3487

=== 800m ===
The heats were held at 18:22.

Rank	Heat	Lane	Name	Nationality	Time	Points	Notes
1	1	2	Zuzana Hejnová	Czech Republic	2:09.93	966	CB
2	1	5	Jessica Samuelsson	Sweden	2:12.55	928	PB
3	1	3	Kaie Kand	Estonia	2:12.86	923	SB
4	1	4	Ida Marcussen	Norway	2:12.93	922	PB
5	2	5	Karolina Tymińska	Poland	2:14.06	906	
6	1	6	Bárbara Hernando	Spain	2:15.87	881	PB
7	2	3	Remona Fransen	Netherlands	2:16.24	875	PB
8	2	6	Marina Goncharova	Russia	2:16.66	869	=SB
9	2	2	Antoinette Nana Djimou Ida	France	2:18.99	837	
10	1	6	Yana Panteleyeva	Russia	2:20.06	823	
11	1	1	Grit Šadeiko	Estonia	2:23.54	776	
12	2	1	Aiga Grabuste	Latvia	2:25.44	751	SB
13	2	4	Austra Skujytė	Lithuania	2:26.54	737	SB
14	2	6	Sara Aerts	Belgium	2:31.94	669	

=== Final standings ===
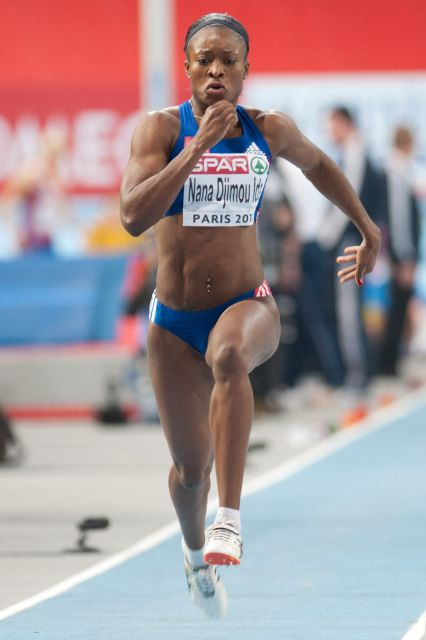
Gold medallist Antoinette Nana Djimou Ida.

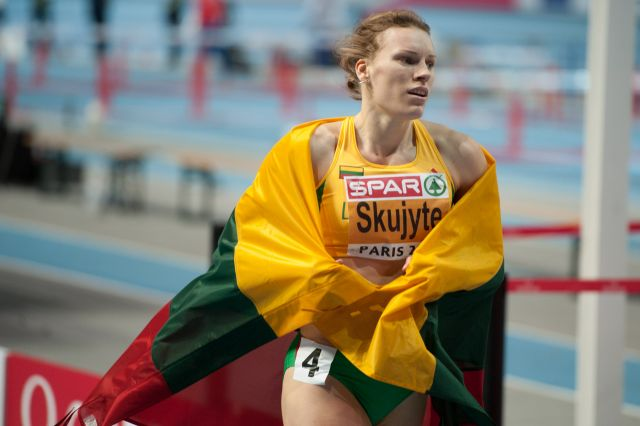
Silver medallist Austra Skujytė.

Place	Athlete	Nation	Points	Notes
1st place, gold medalist(s)	Antoinette Nana Djimou Ida	France	4723	WL, NR
2nd place, silver medalist(s)	Austra Skujytė	Lithuania	4706	
3rd place, bronze medalist(s)	Remona Fransen	Netherlands	4665	PB
4	Karolina Tymińska	Poland	4612	SB
5	Jessica Samuelsson	Sweden	4497	PB
6	Marina Goncharova	Russia	4469	SB
7	Zuzana Hejnová	Czech Republic	4453	PB
8	Kaie Kand	Estonia	4399	SB
9	Grit Šadeiko	Estonia	4358	
10	Aiga Grabuste	Latvia	4342	
11	Ida Marcussen	Norway	4283	NR
12	Sara Aerts	Belgium	4282	PB
13	Yana Panteleyeva	Russia	4265	
14	Bárbara Hernando	Spain	4128	
	Eliška Klučinová	Czech Republic	DNS	
