= Aiga Grabuste =

Latvian heptathlete

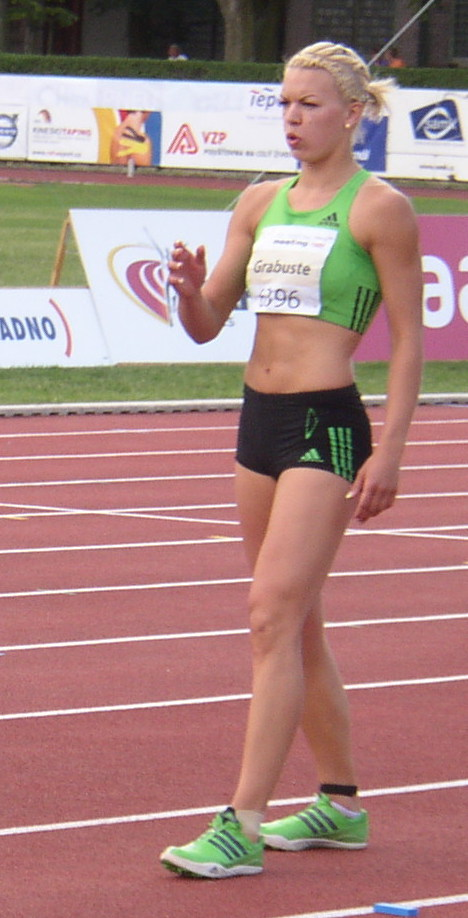
- Aiga Grabuste at the 2011 TNT - Fortuna Meeting in Kladno

Personal information
- Nationality: Latvian
- Born: 24 March 1988 (age 38) Rēzekne, Latvian SSR, Soviet Union
- Height: 1.78 m (5 ft 10 in)
- Weight: 55 kg (121 lb)

Sport
- Country: Latvia
- Sport: Track and field
- Event: Heptathlon

Achievements and titles
- Personal best: Heptathlon: 6414 points
Medal record
Women's athletics
Representing Latvia
European Championships
Bronze medal – third place	2012 Helsinki	Heptathlon

Aiga Grabuste (born 24 March 1988, in Rēzekne) is a Latvian track and field athlete competing in heptathlon. She represented her country at the 2008 Beijing Olympics and won bronze medal at the 2012 European Athletics Championships, finishing just 10 points behind fellow Latvian Laura Ikauniece.

== Career ==
Grabuste became the 2007 European Junior champion in the heptathlon in Hengelo, Netherlands. She set a then personal best of 6396 points at the 2009 European Athletics U23 Championships in Kaunas, Lithuania, winning the gold medal.

She represented her country at the 2008 Beijing Olympics, planning eighteenth overall with a tally of 6050 points.

In the indoor women's pentathlon, she was credited with a seventh-place finish at the 2010 IAAF World Indoor Championships in Doha after initially placing eighth, but Russian athlete Tatyana Chernova was subsequently stripped of two years of results, up to 14 August 2011.

She placed tenth at the 2011 European Athletics Indoor Championships. At the TNT - Fortuna Meeting in 2011 she set bests in the 200 metres, long jump and 800 metres events to take third overall with a score of 6252 points.

At the 2012 European Athletics Championships Grabuste initially finished in fourth place overall after a hard fight with fellow Latvian Laura Ikauniece, finishing 10 points behind her. Eighteen months later-on however, she was rewarded with the bronze medal, as a result of the disqualification of Ukrainian athlete Lyudmyla Yosypenko for use of prohibited substances. She competed at the 2012 Olympic Games in London, England.

== Achievements ==
Year	Competition	Venue	Position	Notes	
2006	World Junior Championships	Beijing, China	9th	5443 pts	14.57-1.68-12.82-25.70-5.80-40.67-2:28.92
2007	European Junior Championships	Hengelo, Netherlands	1st	5920	14.26-1.69-14.26-25.01-6.32-41.21-2:21.85
2007	World Championships	Osaka, Japan	17th	6019 pts	13.84-1.77-13.04-24.98-6.02-45.76-2:19.97
2008	Olympic Games	Beijing, China	19th	6050 pts	13.78-1.77-12.70-24.71-6.36-39.02-2:16.87
2009	European U23 Championships	Kaunas, Lithuania	1st	6396 pts	13.66-1.77-14.56-24.73-6.62-46.11-2:17.74
2009	World Championships	Berlin, Germany	13th	6033 pts	13.78-1.71-13.26-25.49-6.40-43.52-2:17.43
2010	World Indoor Championships	Doha, Qatar	8th	4013 pts	8.94-1.63-12.33-6.05-2:23.84
2011	European Indoor Championships	Paris, France	10th	4342 pts	8.68-1.71-14.18-6.29-2:25.44
2012	European Championships	Helsinki, Finland	3rd	6325 pts	13.66–1.74–13.52–24.47–6.46–45.85–2:12.90
2012	Olympic Games	London, United Kingdom	33rd	DNF	13.65-1.77-13.52-0.00-0.00-0.00

== Personal bests ==
=== Heptathlon ===
Event	Record	Venue	Year
100 m hurdles	13.46 s	Ratingen, Germany	2011
High jump	1.77 m	Beijing, China	2008
Shot put	14.56 m	Kaunas, Lithuania	2009
200 m	24.42 s	Kladno, Czech Republic	2011
Long jump	6.69 m	Prague, Czech Republic	2014
Javelin	46.40 m	Ratingen, Germany	2011
800 m	2:12.90 min	Helsinki, Finland	2012
Heptathlon	6507 pts	Ratingen, Germany	2009

=== Pentathlon ===
Event	Record	Venue	Year
60 m hurdles	8.48 s	Tartu, Estonia	2009
High jump	1.79 m	Riga, Latvia	2011
Shot put	14.18 m	Paris, France	2011
Long jump	6.82 m	Tbilisi, Georgia	2015
800 m	2:12.49 min	Tallinn, Estonia	2009
Pentathlon	4463 pts	Tallinn, Estonia	2009

Awards
Preceded by Ernests Gulbis	Latvian Rising Sportspersonality of the Year; 2007	Succeeded by Sinta Ozoliņa
