= 2010 TNT – Fortuna Meeting =

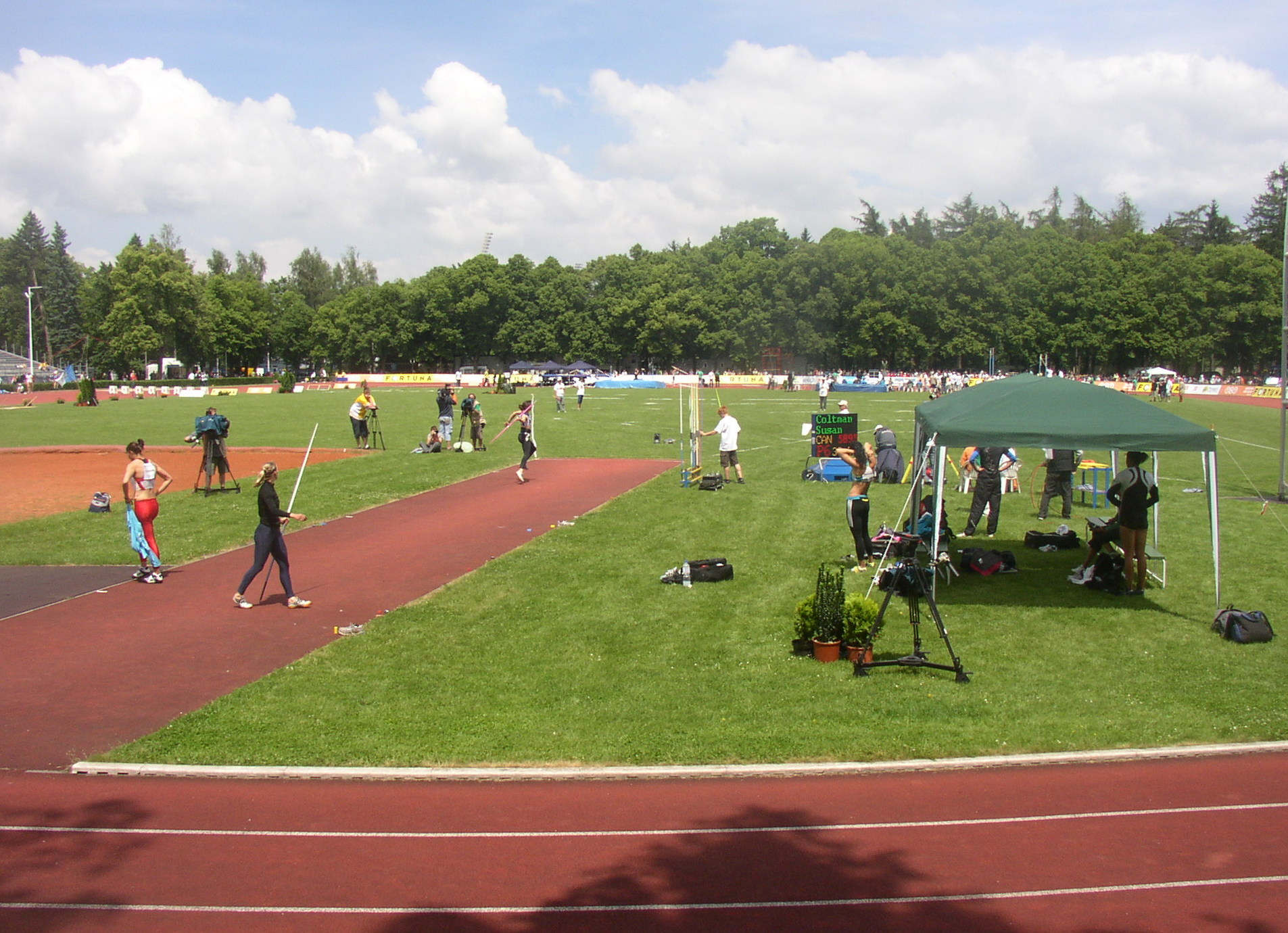
Javelin throw in women's heptathlon (Sletiště Stadium, 16 June 2010)

The 4th edition of the annual TNT - Fortuna Meeting took place on 15 and 16 June 2010 in Kladno, Czech Republic. The track and field competition, featuring a decathlon (men) and a heptathlon (women) event was part of the 2010 IAAF World Combined Events Challenge. The 2010 edition was the first in history of Kladno meeting to gain the top-level IAAF World Combined Events Challenge rank.

== Men's Decathlon ==
=== Schedule ===
15 June
1. 100 m
2. Long Jump
3. Shot Put
4. High Jump
5. 400 m

16 June
6. 110 m hurdles
7. Discus Throw
8. Pole Vault
9. Javelin Throw
10. 1,500 m

=== Records ===
World Record	Roman Šebrle (CZE)	9026	27 May 2001	Götzis, Austria
Event Record	Roman Šebrle (CZE)	8697	20 June 2007	Kladno, Czech Republic

=== Results ===
The highest mark recorded in each event is highlighted in yellow

Rank	Athlete	Decathlon										Points
Rank	Athlete	1	2	3	4	5	6	7	8	9	10	Points
1	Oleksiy Kasyanov (UKR)	10.69	7.79	15.24	2.00	48.07	14.24	47.03	4.70	50.78	4:27.93	8381
2	Aleksey Drozdov (RUS)	11.19	7.32	15.95	2.12	51.32	15.03	50.10	4.80	63.64	4:43.52	8246
3	Jamie Adjetey-Nelson (CAN)	10.76	7.61	14.89	2.09	49.70	14.62	49.17	4.40	62.74	4:52.28	8239
4	Maurice Smith (JAM)	10.79	7.15	15.15	1.94	48.25	14.20	53.02	4.60	60.14	4:58.05	8186
5	Jake Arnold (USA)	10.99	6.92	15.34	2.00	49.13	14.11	48.15	5.00	58.56	4:50.71	8159
6	Brent Newdick (NZL)	11.07	7.37	13.96	1.91	49.40	14.71	46.68	4.70	64.09	4:29.35	8091
7	Eduard Mikhan (BLR)	10.94	7.40	13.89	1.94	48.47	14.38	44.36	4.60	52.75	4:27.84	7999
8	Vasiliy Kharlamov (RUS)	11.28	7.34	14.75	1.91	50.37	15.15	46.78	4.90	59.77	4:38.25	7930
9	Marcin Dróżdż (POL)	11.28	7.00	13.43	2.09	51.09	14.76	44.88	5.00	57.78	4:56.04	7817
10	Ivan Scolfaro da Silva (BRA)	11.36	7.01	13.00	2.00	50.00	14.75	40.30	4.60	59.10	4:35.46	7657
11	Pavel Baar (CZE)	10.99	6.93	13.75	1.94	48.83	14.90	39.72	4.30	56.93	4:46.74	7544
12	Hamdi Dhouibi (TUN)	11.12	6.81	14.10	1.82	48.88	14.69	43.90	4.60	50.83	4:41.75	7539
13	Jaroslav Hedvičárk (CZE)	10.79	7.24	11.42	1.97	48.27	14.92	39.98	4.50	43.19	4:40.48	7330
14	Adam Pašiak (CZE)	11.22	7.48	13.13	2.00	54.06	16.54	42.63	5.10	52.86	5:25.68	7241
15	Kyle McCarthy (AUS)	11.52	6.55	14.53	1.88	50.48	15.74	40.18	4.50	56.63	4:44.68	7235
16	Scott McLaren (NZL)	11.47	6.57	13.47	1.88	50.65	15.90	41.11	4.40	50.58	4:44.61	7060
17	Darius Draudvila (LTU)	10.87	7.24	15.03	2.00	48.69	14.47	47.95	NM	54.78	DNF	6635
—	Claston Bernard (JAM)	11.23	—	—	—	—	—	—	—	—	—	DNF
—	Bryan Clay (USA)	14.05	—	—	—	—	—	—	—	—	—	DNF
—	Slaven Dizdarević (SVK)	11.21	6.86	14.79	1.94	DNF	—	—	—	—	—	DNF
—	Dmitriy Karpov (KAZ)	11.18	6.61	—	—	—	—	—	—	—	—	DNF
—	Adam Nejedlý (CZE)	11.17	7.16	13.57	2.06	49.81	14.43	NM	—	—	—	DNF
—	Tomáš Nešvera (CZE)	11.37	7.09	13.11	1.91	51.95	DNF	—	—	—	—	DNF
—	Roland Schwarzl (AUT)	11.36	7.33	14.47	1.91	50.73	14.43	46.40	—	—	—	DNF
—	Roman Šebrle (CZE)	25.49	—	—	—	—	—	—	—	—	—	DNF
—	Frédéric Xhonneux (BEL)	11.76	7.09	14.13	—	—	—	—	—	—	—	DNF

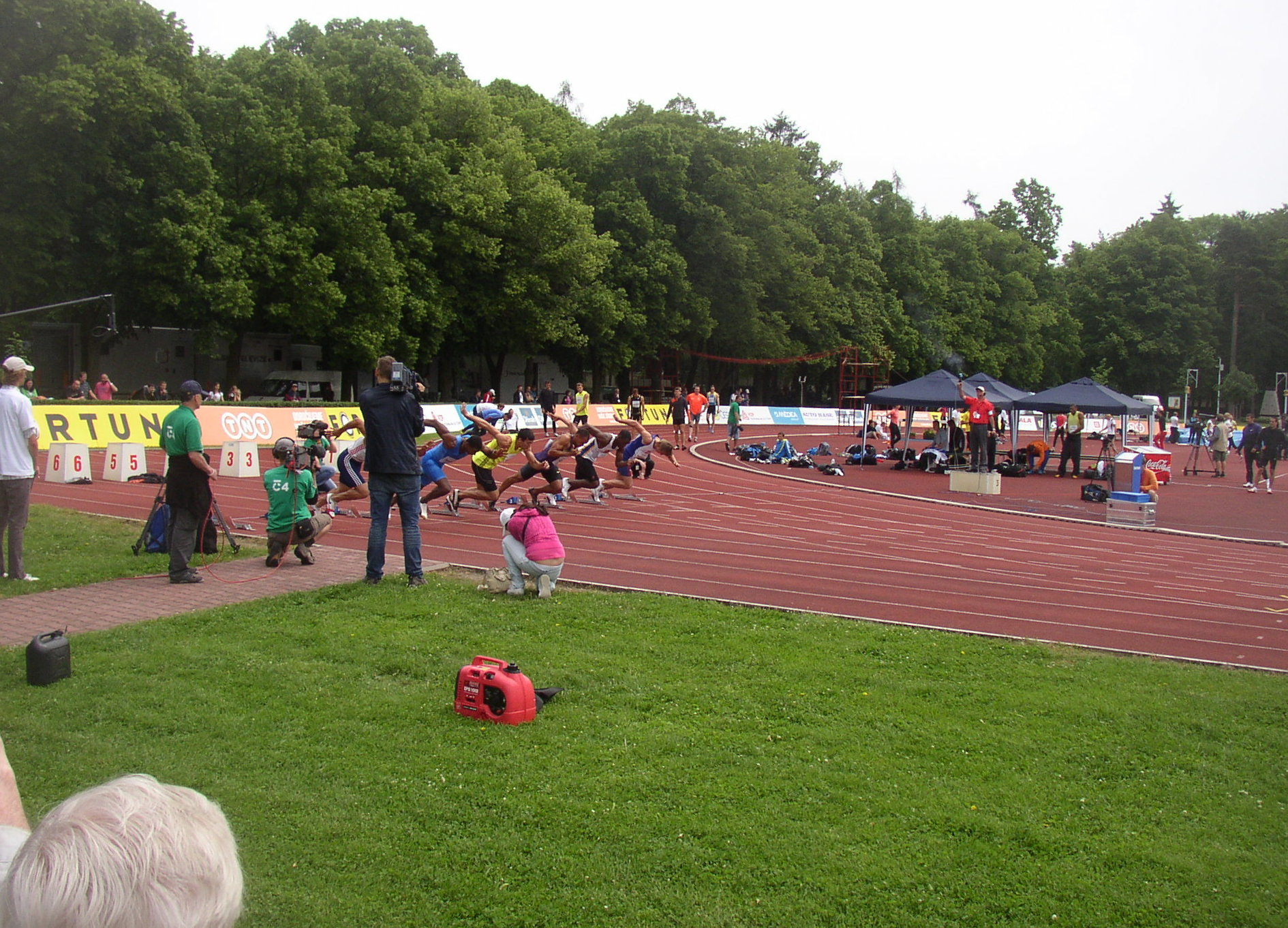
100 m, heat 1

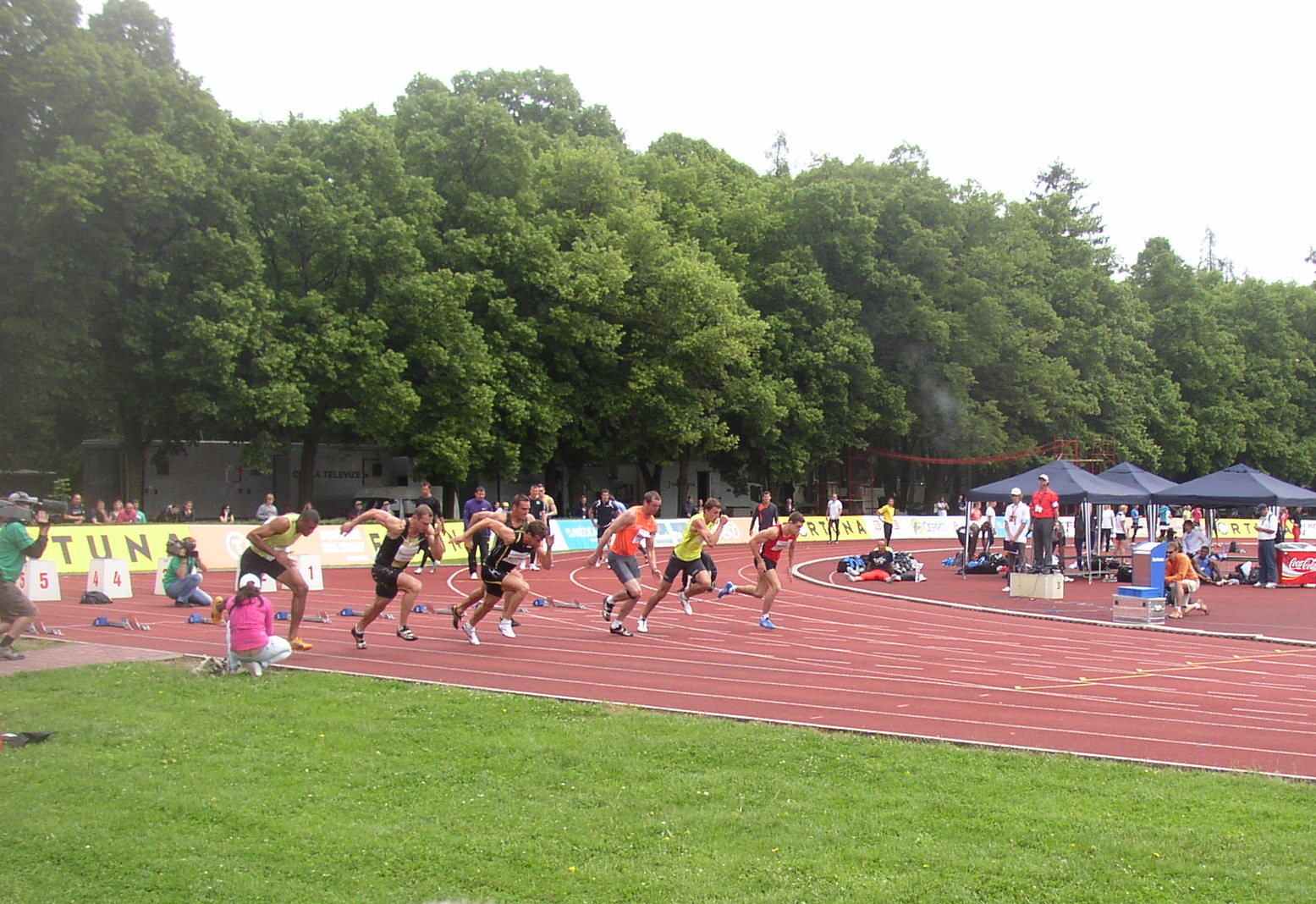
100 m, heat 2

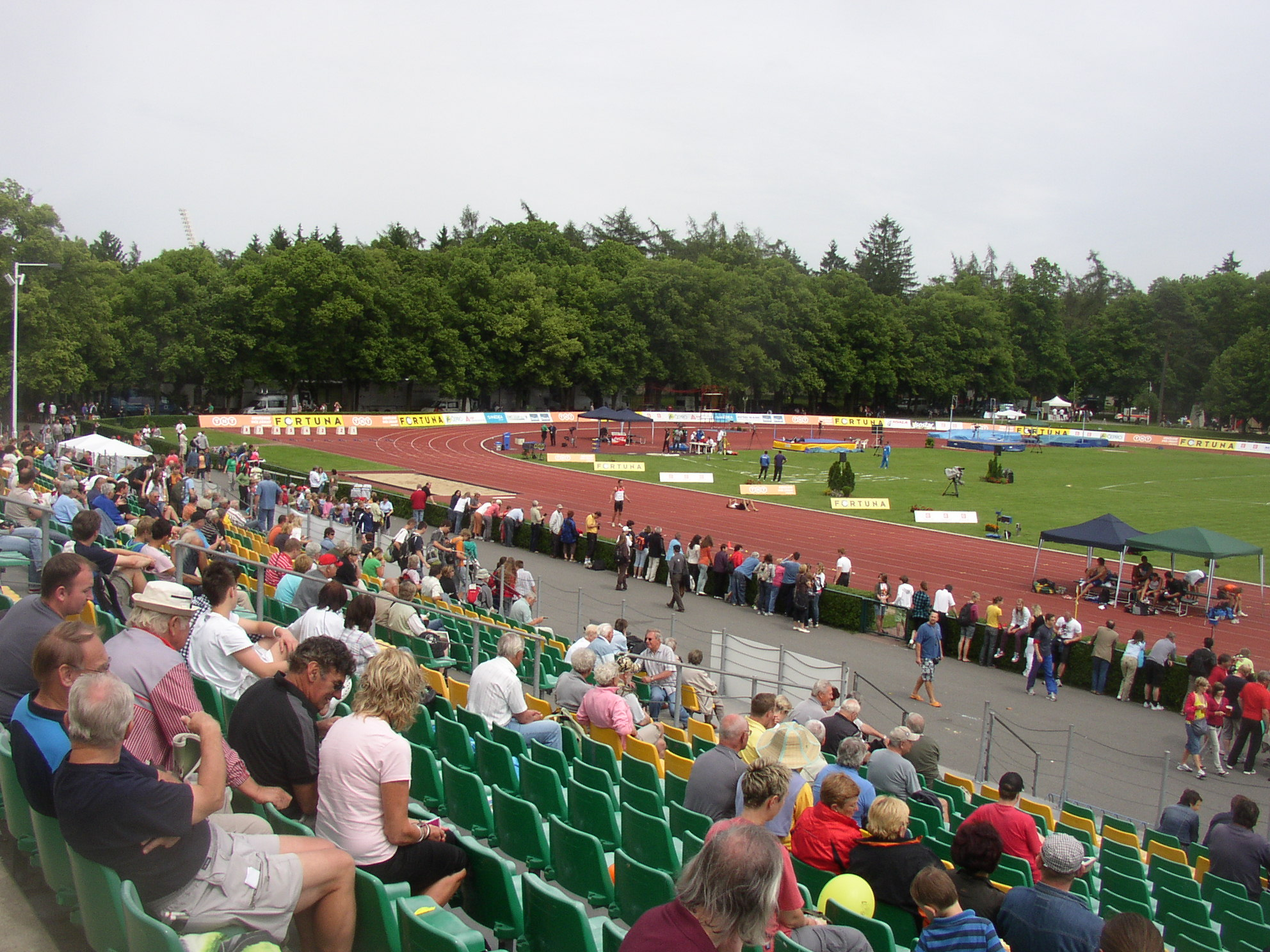
Long jump, Ivan Scolfaro da Silva prepares for his attempt

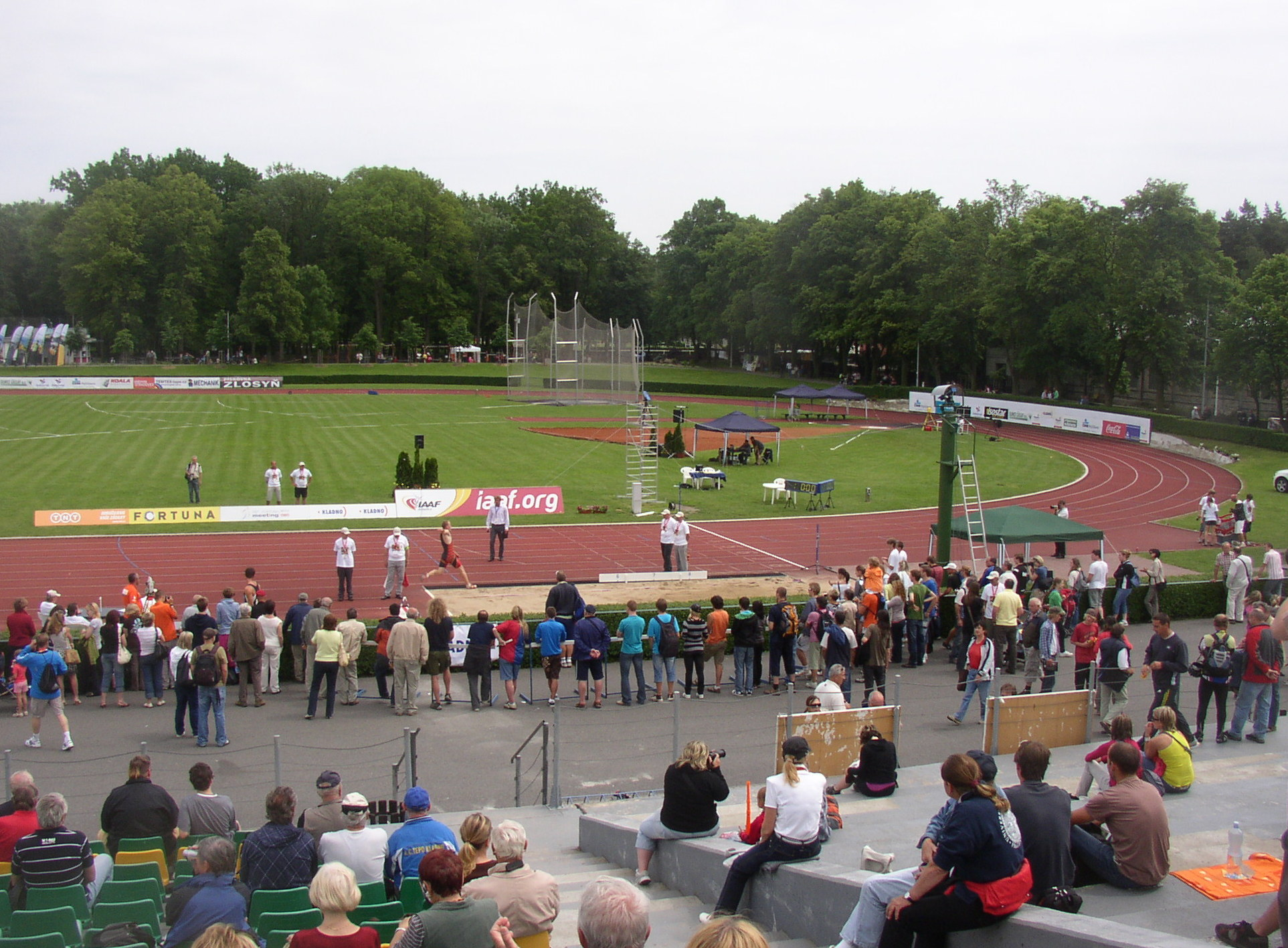
Tomáš Nešvera performing the long jump

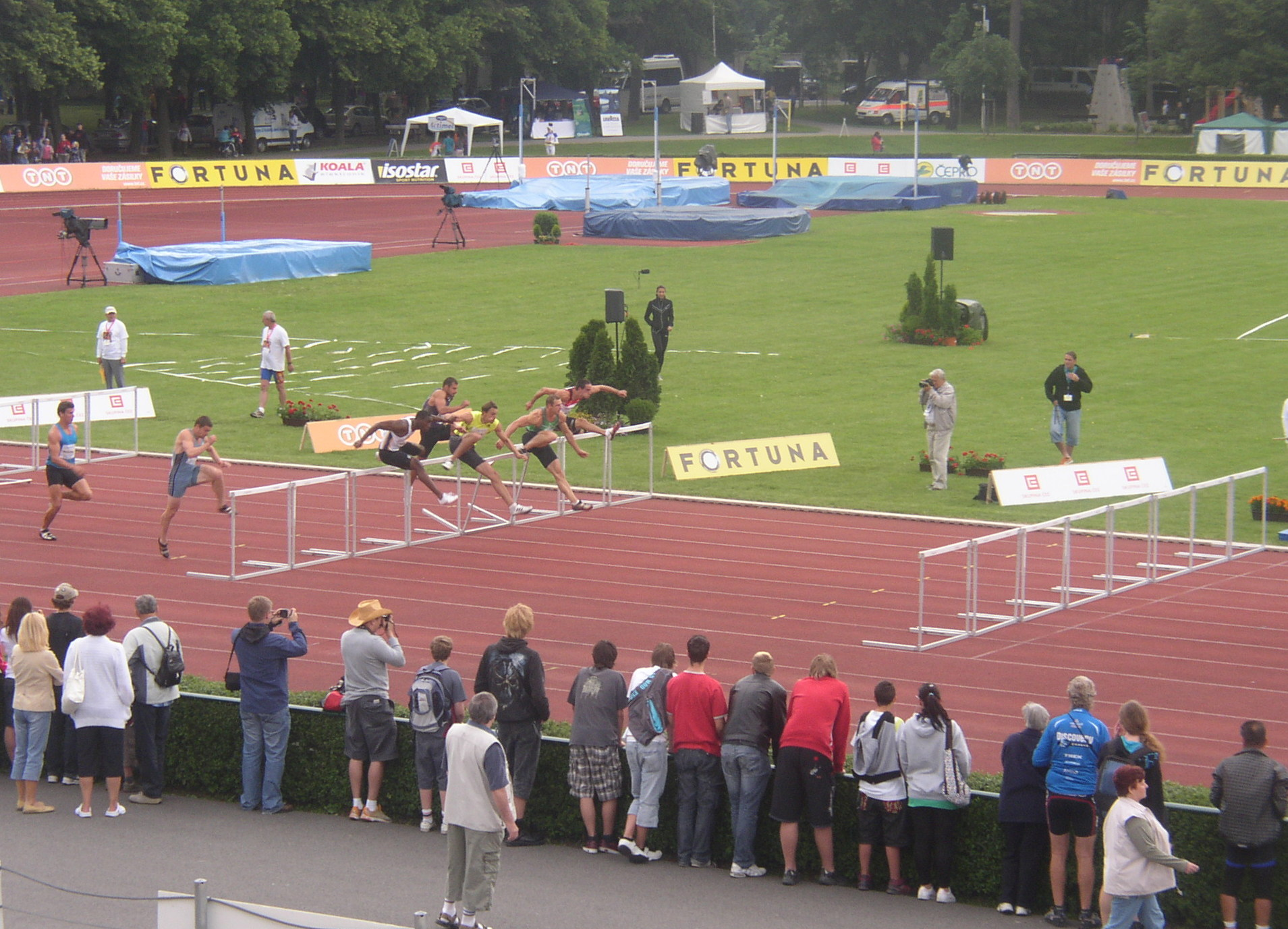
110 m hurdles, heat 2

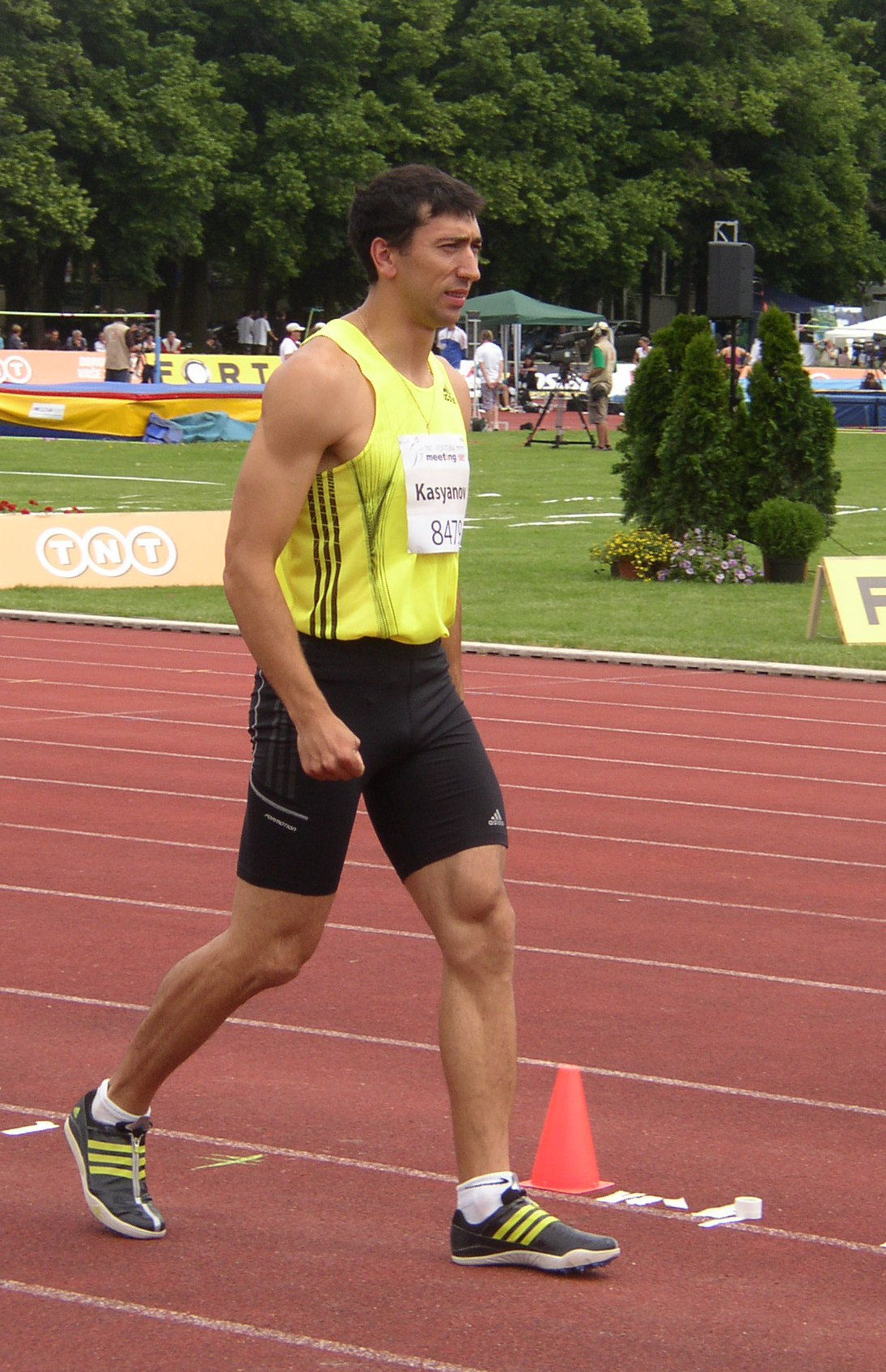
Oleksiy Kasyanov

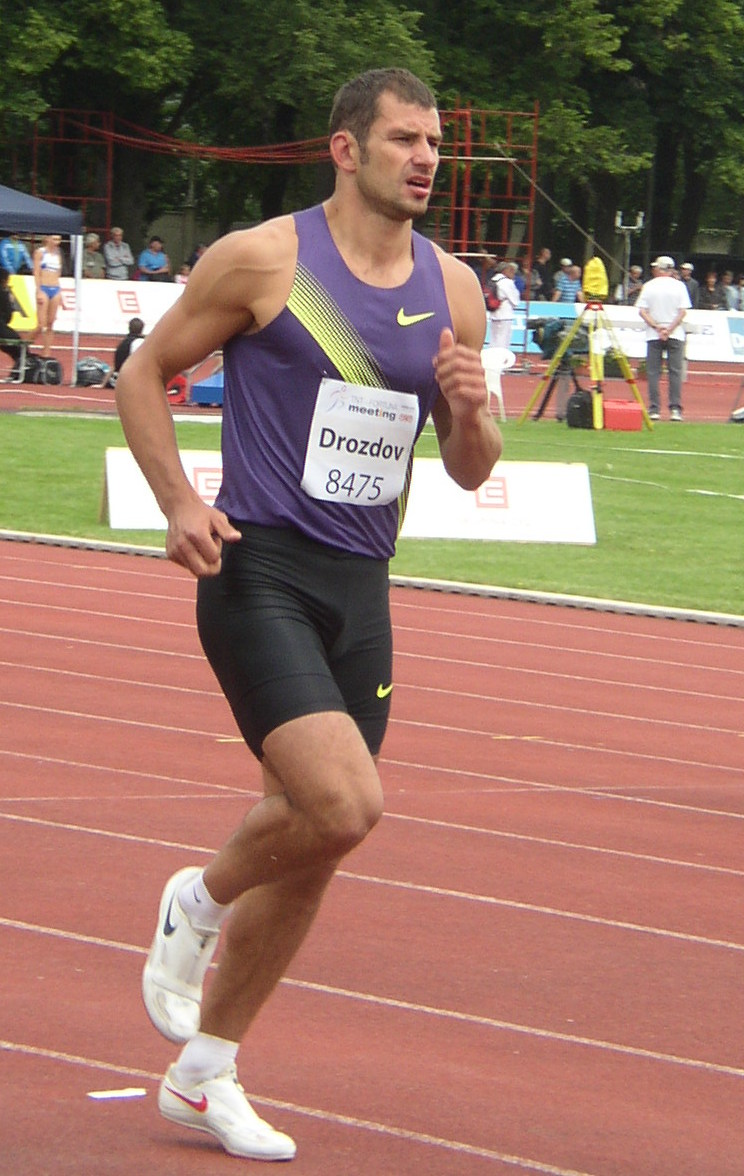
Aleksey Drozdov

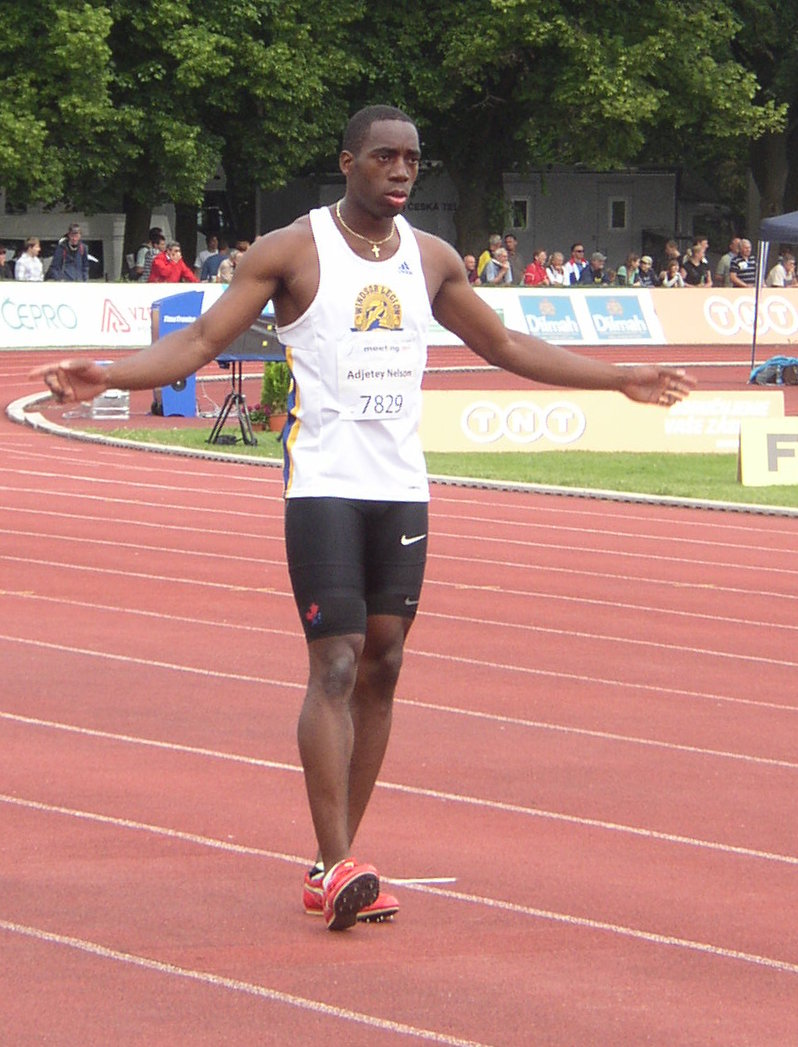
Jamie Adjetey-Nelson

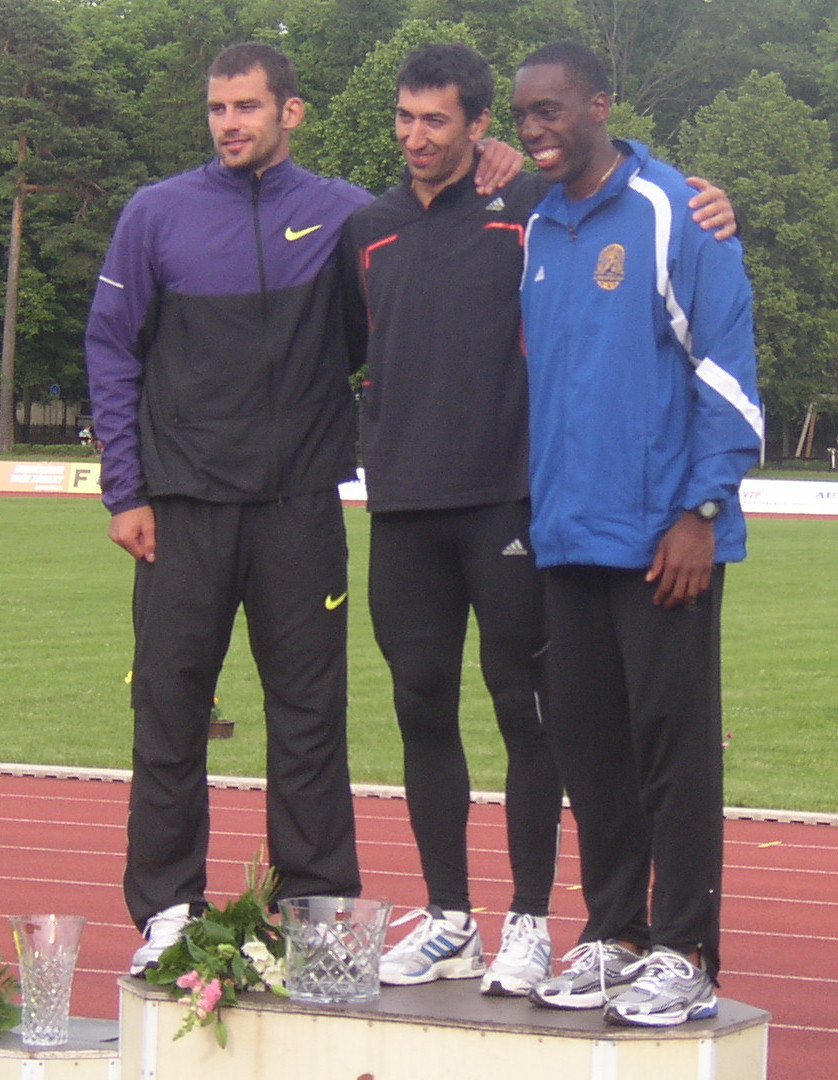
Podium for decathletes (Aleksey Drozdov, Oleksiy Kasyanov and Jamie Adjetey-Nelson)

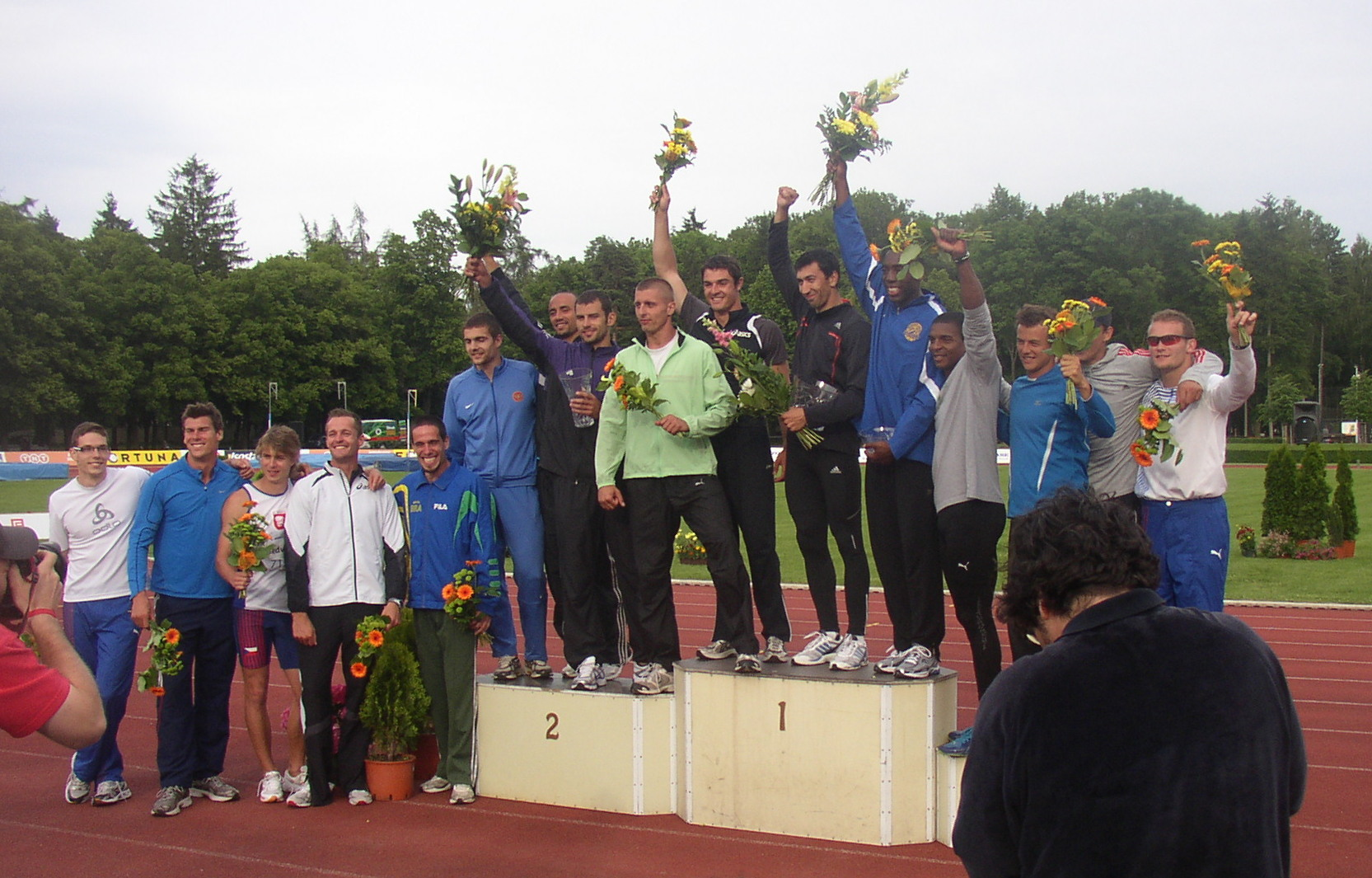
Final cheer for all decathletes who have passed through the competition

== Women's Heptathlon ==
=== Schedule ===
15 June
1. 100 m hurdles
2. High Jump
3. Shot Put
4. 200 m

16 June
5. Long Jump
6. Javelin Throw
7. 800 m

=== Records ===
World Record	Jackie Joyner-Kersee (USA)	7291	September 24, 1988	Seoul, South Korea
Event Record	Lyudmyla Blonska (UKR)	6421	June 19, 2008	Kladno, Czech Republic

=== Results ===
The highest mark recorded in each event is highlighted in yellow

Rank	Athlete	Heptathlon							Points
Rank	Athlete	1	2	3	4	5	6	7	Points
1	Eliška Klučinová (CZE)	14.17	1.81	13.83	25.08	6.18	50.75	2:15.85	6268
2	Marina Goncharova (RUS)	13.89	1.78	13.42	25.45	6.11	47.14	2:11.28	6182
3	Lyudmyla Yosypenko (UKR)	13.84	1.78	12.50	24.76	6.22	49.04	2:19.88	6142
4	Hanna Melnychenko (UKR)	13.71	1.84	12.67	24.74	6.27	35.21	2:16.72	6045
5	Karolina Tymińska (POL)	13.93	1.66	14.37	24.33	6.21	32.84	2:09.41	5981
6	Blandine Maisonnier (FRA)	14.12	1.78	12.27	25.16	6.33	36.69	2:17.07	5886
7	Jana Korešová (CZE)	13.59	1.66	11.43	24.81	6.20	34.01	2:14.32	5737
8	Vanessa Spinola (BRA)	14.49	1.69	12.57	24.80	5.89	38.46	2:16.05	5688
9	Lucia Slaničková (SVK)	14.43	1.75	10.87	25.29	5.92	40.01	2:13.69	5684
10	Sarah Cowley (NZL)	14.10	1.75	11.25	25.95	5.84	37.52	2:17.33	5575
11	Anna Blank (RUS)	14.61	1.66	12.30	26.06	5.79	36.20	2:23.05	5337
12	Diane Barras (FRA)	14.18	1.72	10.82	26.46	5.91	34.38	2:27.47	5279
13	Jitka Moudrá (CZE)	15.26	1.75	11.61	26.51	5.57	37.79	2:26.34	5879
14	Amandine Constantin (FRA)	13.83	1.69	11.33	25.43	5.55	37.22	2:46.93	5135
15	Rebecca Robinson (AUS)	14.45	1.48	12.18	25.49	5.36	31.14	2:22.45	4979
16	Alena Galertová (CZE)	15.12	1.57	11.66	26.98	5.38	35.92	2:26.64	4869
—	Susan Coltman (CAN)	13.84	1.66	12.54	25.24	6.06	35.02	—	DNF
—	Aneta Komrsková (CZE)	15.17	1.63	8.77	26.83	5.10	—	—	DNF

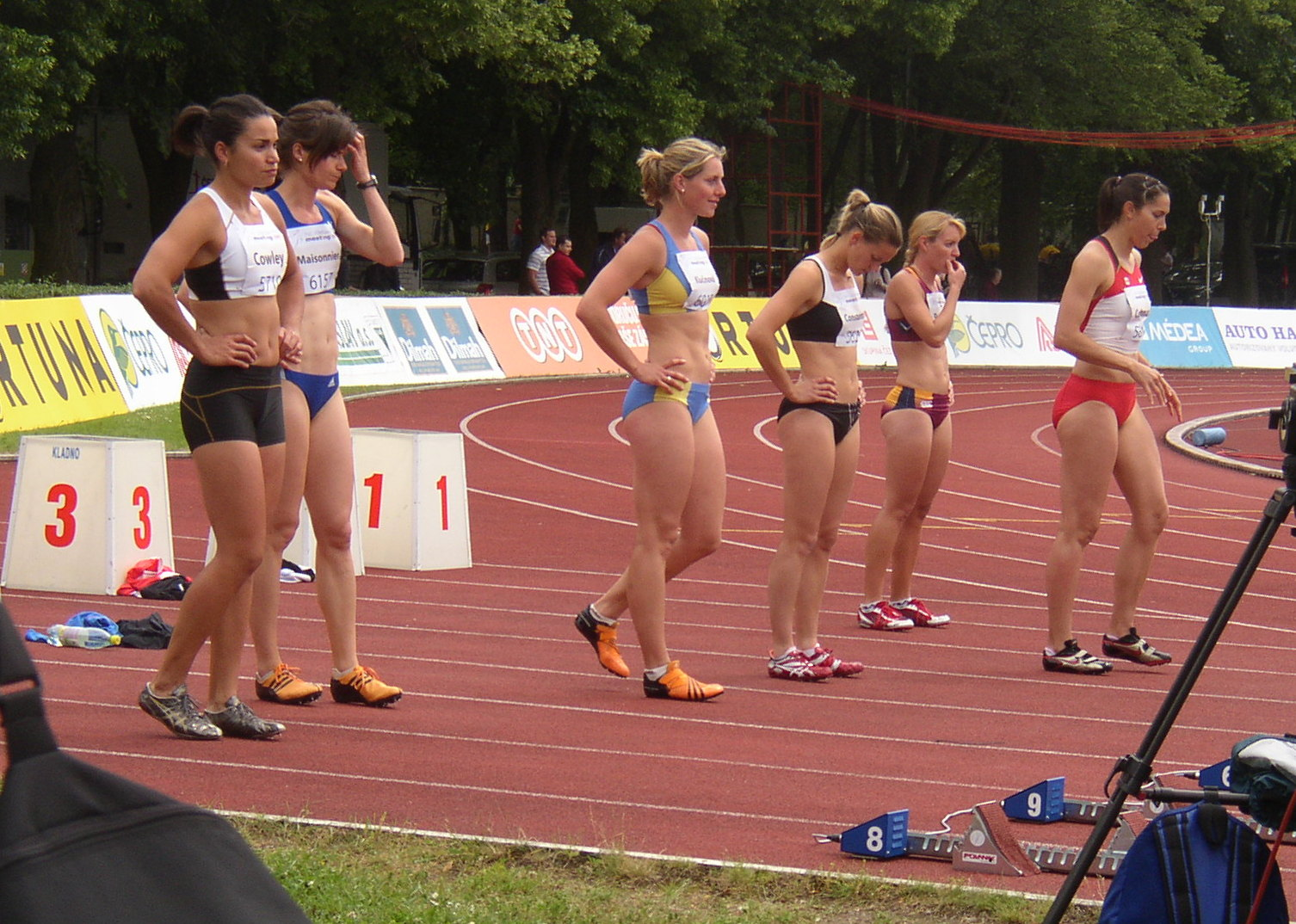
100 m hurdles, heat 2

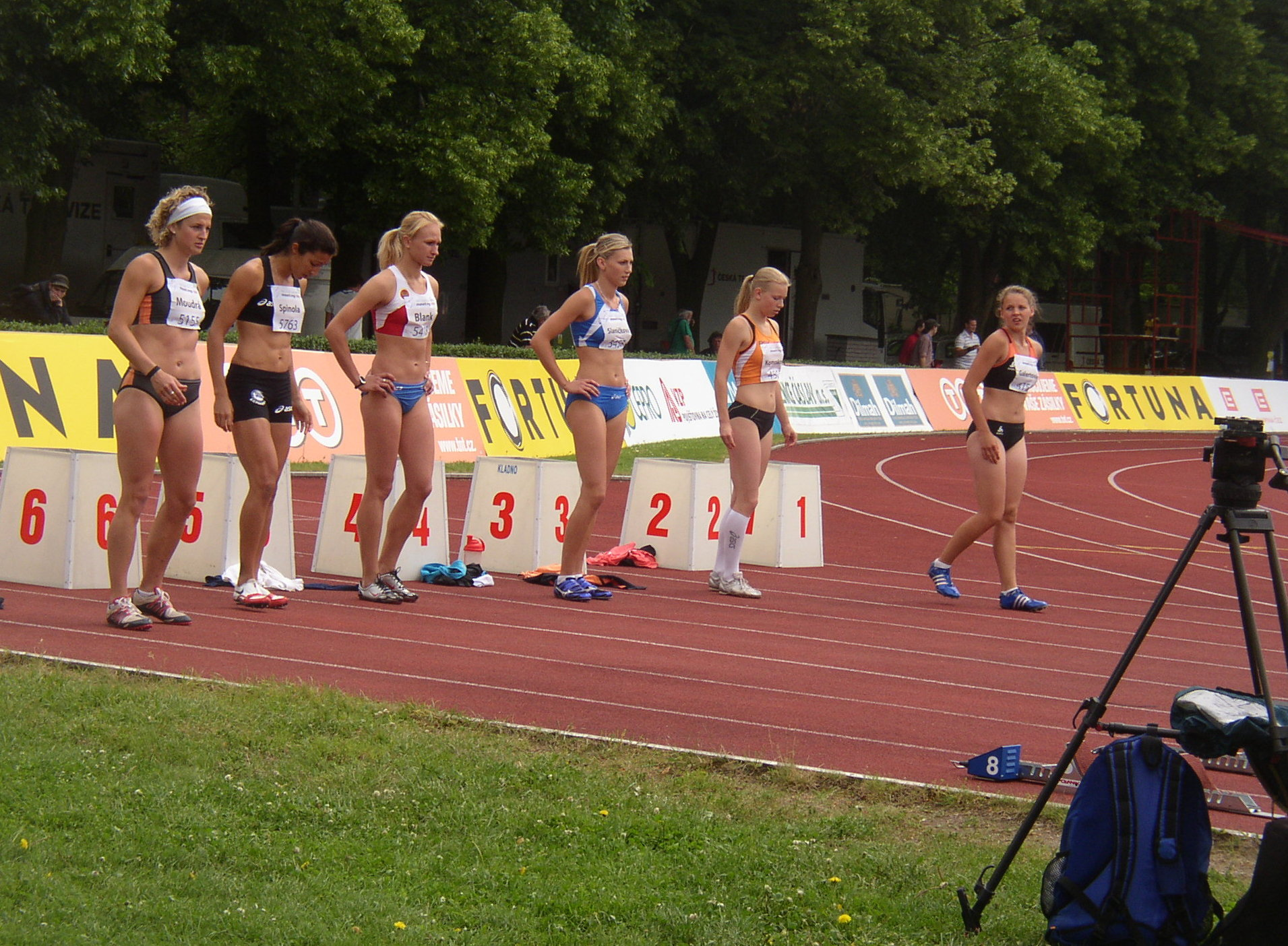
100 m hurdles, heat 3

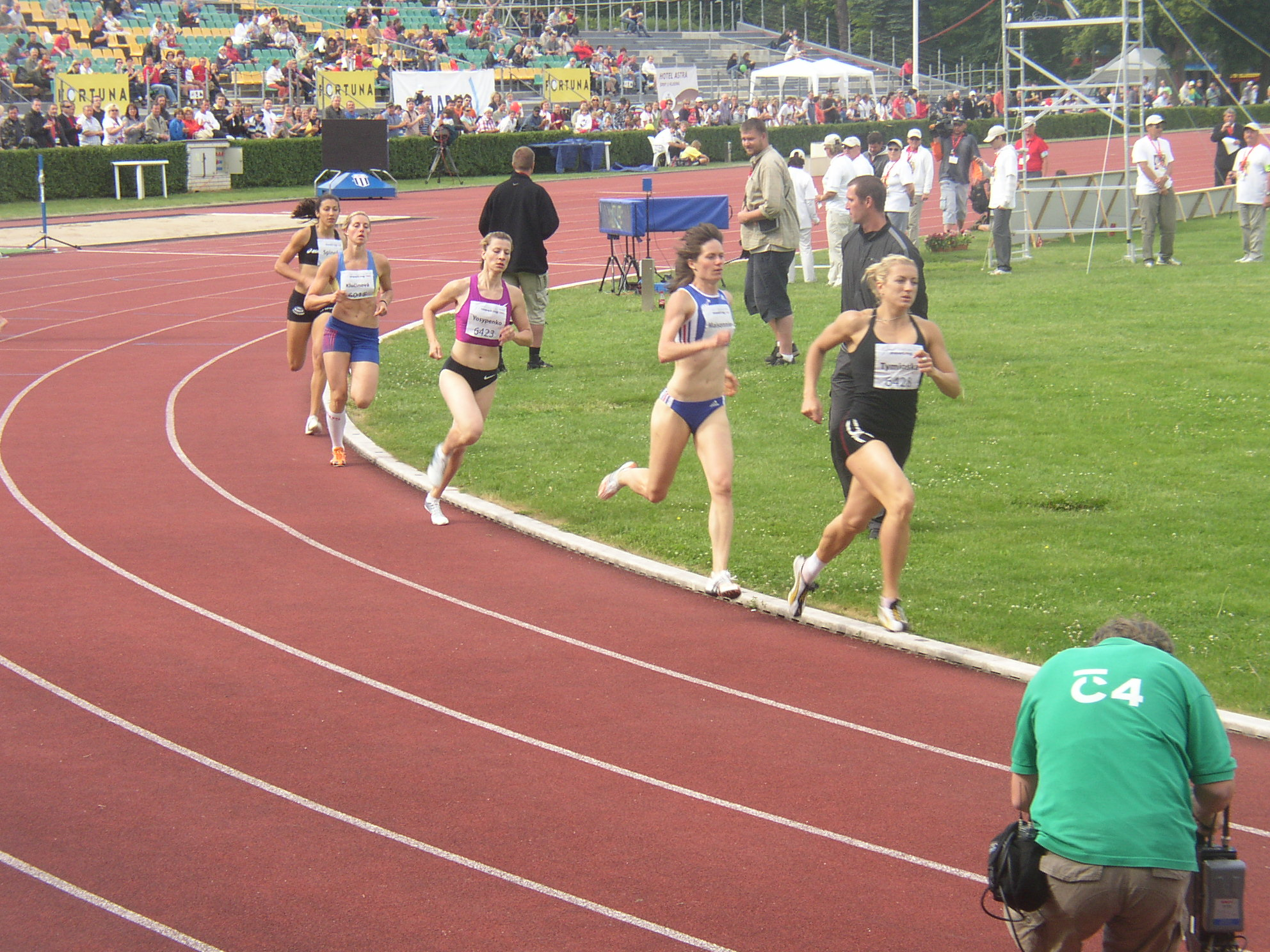
800 m, heat 2 (Tymińska in the lead, Klučinová struggling for overall victory and for national record at fourth position)

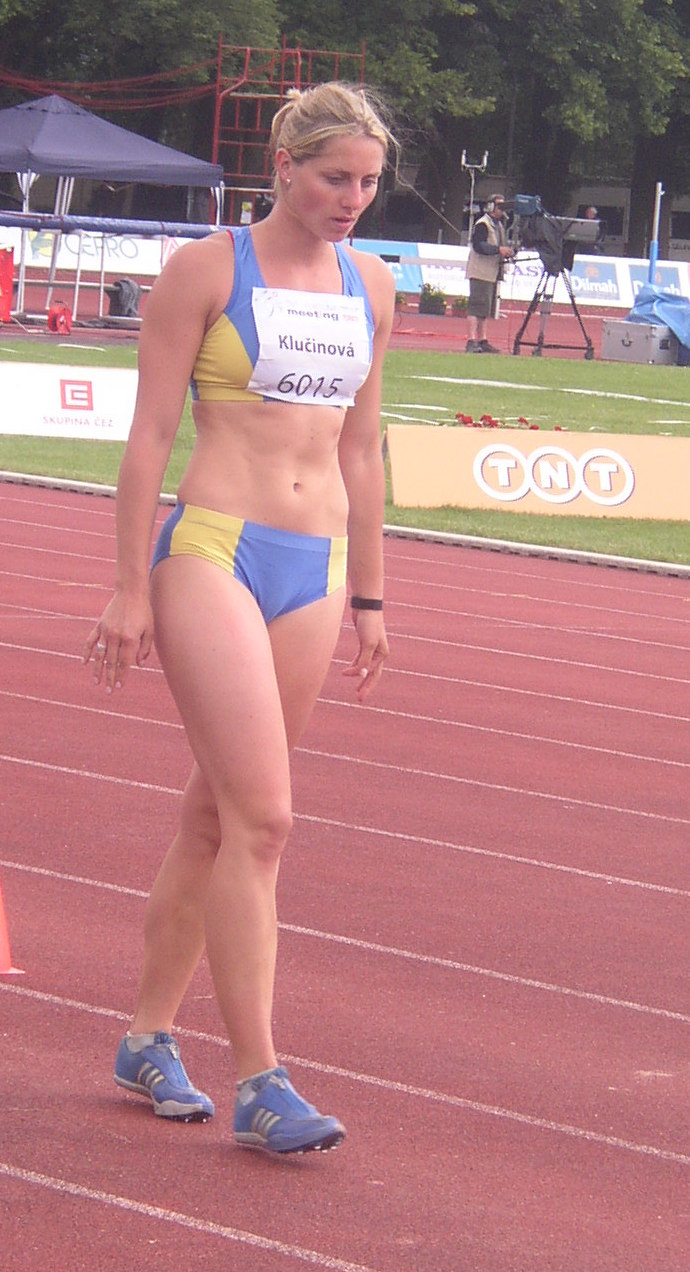
Eliška Klučinová

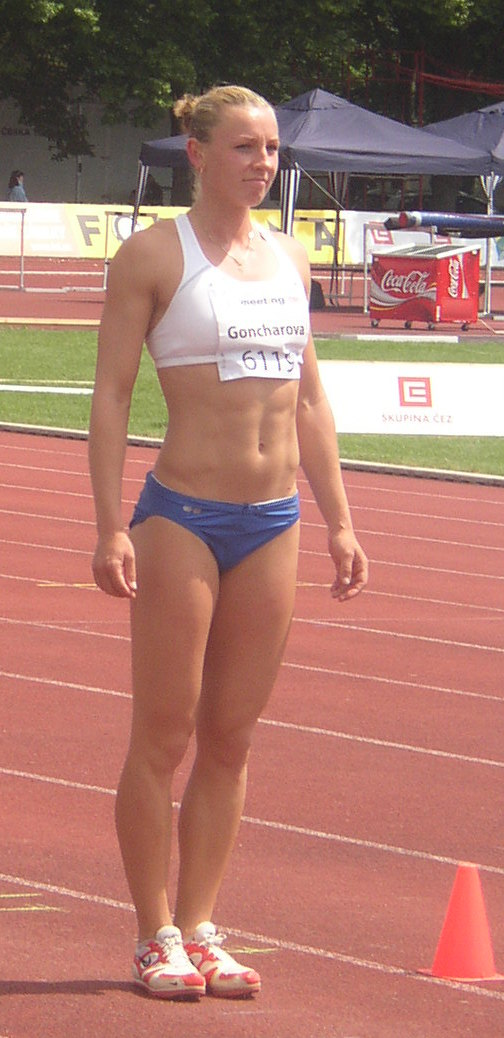
Marina Goncharova

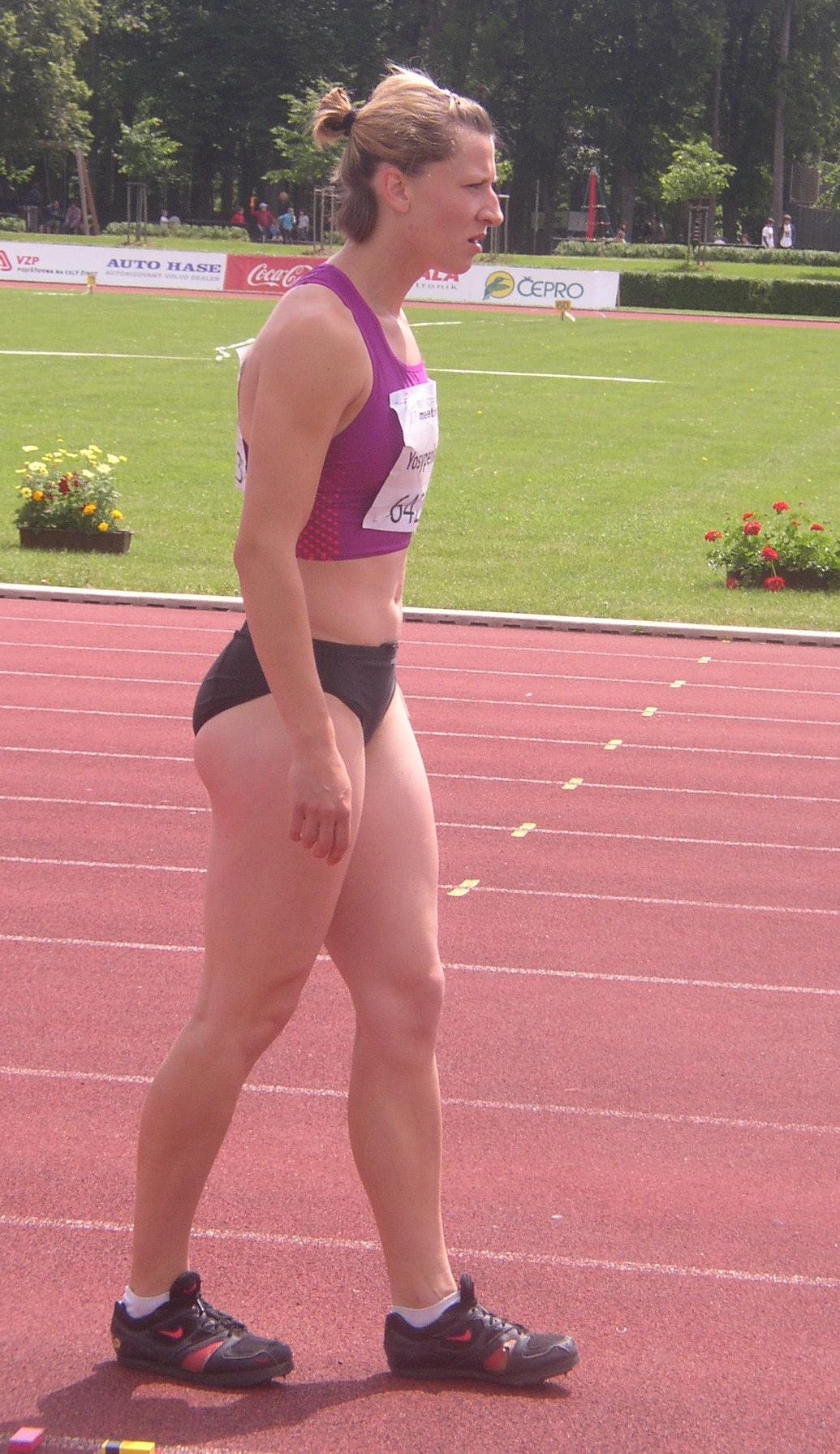
Lyudmyla Yosypenko

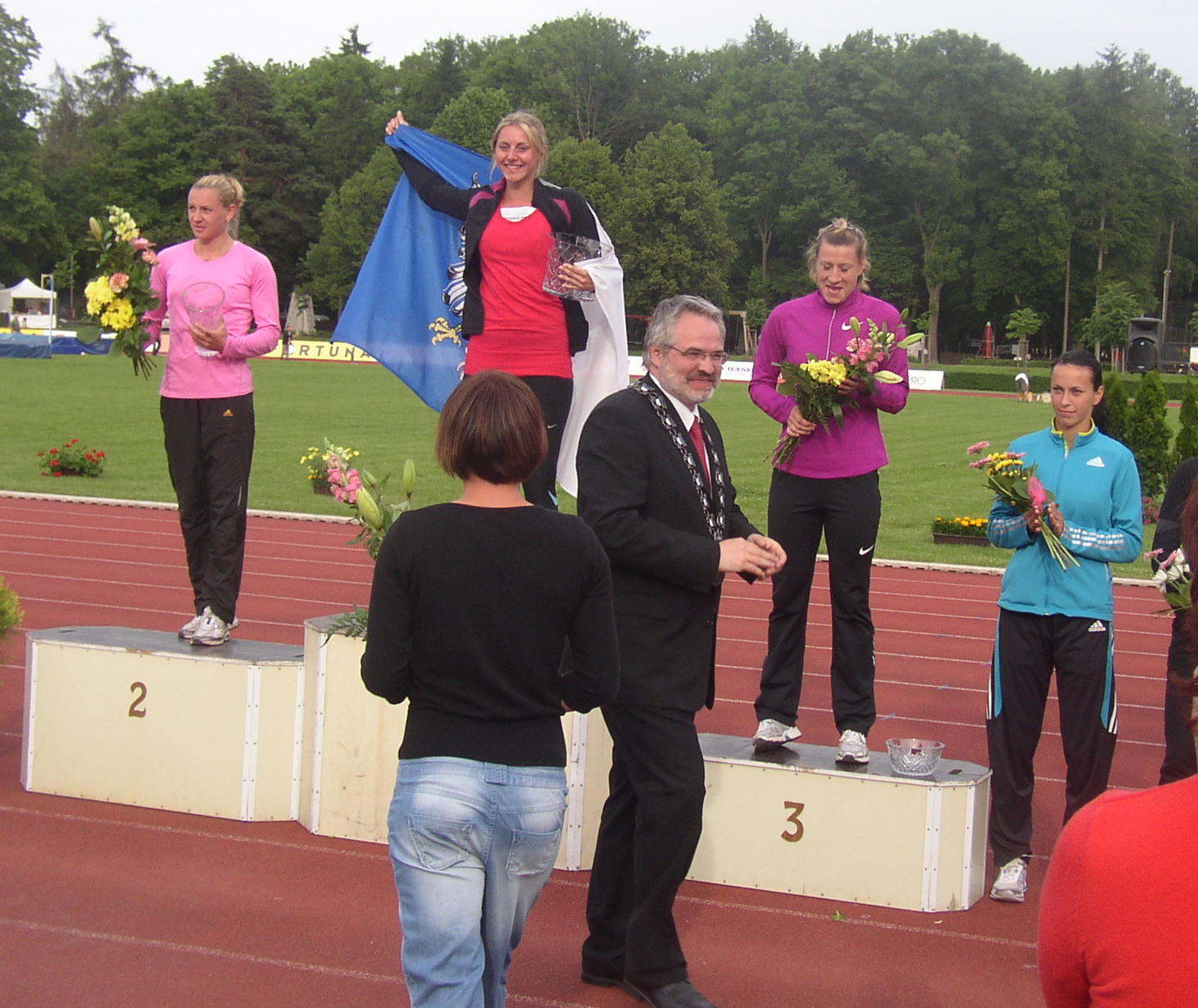
Podium for heptathletes (Goncharova, Klučinová and Yosypenko; in the right Melnychenko)

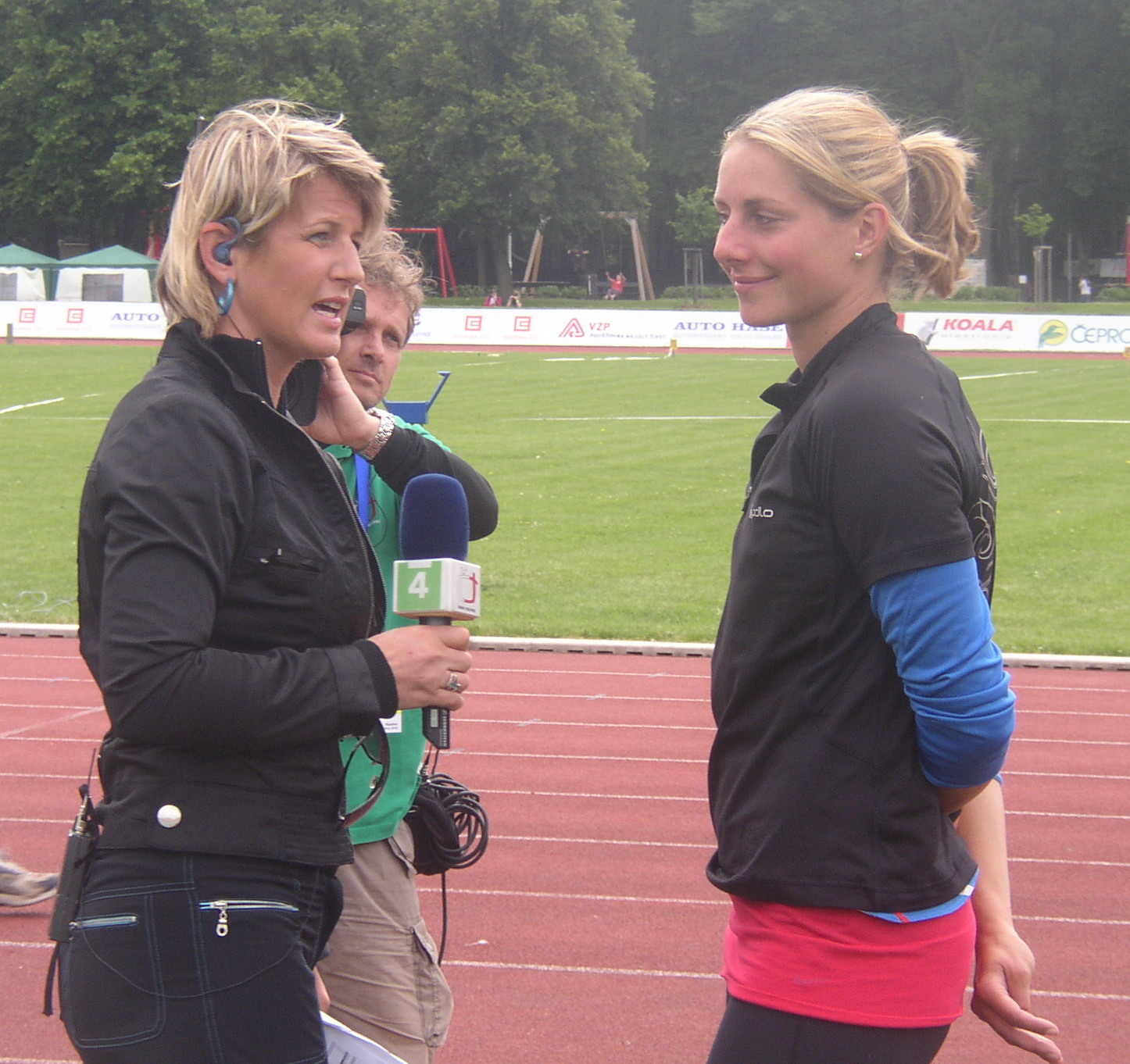
TV presenter (and former heptathlete) Kateřina Nekolná interviewing Eliška Klučinová for ČT4 channel. Klučinová equalled 22 years old Czech record in heptathlon at this competition.

== See also ==
- 2010 European Athletics Championships – Men's decathlon
- 2010 European Athletics Championships – Women's heptathlon
