= 2010 IAAF World Indoor Championships – Women's pentathlon =

The women's pentathlon at the 2010 IAAF World Indoor Championships was held at the ASPIRE Dome on 13 March.

== Medalists ==
Gold	Silver	Bronze
Jessica Ennis-Hill; United Kingdom	Nataliya Dobrynska; Ukraine	Hyleas Fountain; United States

== Records ==
Standing records prior to the 2010 IAAF World Indoor Championships
World record	Irina Belova (CIS)	4991	Berlin, Germany	15 February 1992
Championship record	Carolina Klüft (SWE)	4933	Birmingham, Great Britain	14 March 2003
World Leading	Tatyana Chernova (RUS)	4855	Penza, Russia	3 February 2010
African record	Eunice Barber (SLE)	4558	Paris, France	17 March 1993
Asian record	Olga Rypakova (KAZ)	4582	Pattaya, Thailand	10 February 2006
European record	Irina Belova (CIS)	4991	Berlin, Germany	15 February 1992
North and Central American and Caribbean record	LeShundra Nathan (USA)	4753	Maebashi, Japan	5 March 1999
Oceanian Record	Jane Jamieson (AUS)	4490	Maebashi, Japan	5 March 1999
South American record	Themys Zambrzycki (BRA)	4001	Columbia, United States	8 March 1980

== Qualification standards ==
Eight (8) athletes will be invited by the IAAF in the Heptathlon and in the Pentathlon as follows:

1. the three best athletes from the 2009 Outdoor Lists (as at 31 December 2009) limited to a maximum of one per country and
2. the three best athletes from the 2010 Indoor Lists (as at 22 February 2010)
3. two athletes which may be invited at the discretion of the IAAF

In total no more than two male and two female athletes from any one Member will be invited. Upon refusals or cancellations, the invitations shall be extended to the next ranked athletes in the same lists respecting the above conditions. Members whose athletes are invited as above will receive additional quota places accordingly

== Schedule ==
Date	Time	Round
March 13, 2010	9:00	60 metres hurdles
March 13, 2010	9:40	High jump
March 13, 2010	12:00	Shot put
March 13, 2010	14:45	Long jump
March 13, 2010	17:10	800 metres
March 13, 2010	17:10	Final standings

== Results ==
=== 60 metres hurdles ===
Rank	Name	Nationality	Time	Points	Notes
1	Jessica Ennis	Great Britain	8.04	1120	
2	Hyleas Fountain	United States	8.20	1084	
3	Antoinette Nana Djimou Ida	France	8.26	1070	
4	Karolina Tymińska	Poland	8.48	1021	
5	Nataliya Dobrynska	Ukraine	8.50	1017	
DQ	Tatyana Chernova	Russia	~~8.51~~	~~1015~~	
6	Marina Goncharova	Russia	8.56	1004	PB
7	Aiga Grabuste	Latvia	8.94	922	

=== High jump ===
Rank	Name	Nationality	Result	Points	Notes
1	Jessica Ennis	United Kingdom	1.90	1106	
2	Hyleas Fountain	United States	1.87	1067	SB
3	Nataliya Dobrynska	Ukraine	1.84	1029	SB
4	Antoinette Nana Djimou Ida	France	1.84	1029	PB
DQ	Tatyana Chernova	Russia	~~1.78~~	~~953~~	
5	Marina Goncharova	Russia	1.78	953	
6	Karolina Tymińska	Poland	1.72	879	
7	Aiga Grabuste	Latvia	1.63	771	SB

=== Shot put ===
Rank	Name	Nationality	Result	Points	Notes
1	Nataliya Dobrynska	Ukraine	16.43	957	SB
DQ	Tatyana Chernova	Russia	~~14.54~~	~~830~~	~~PB~~
2	Karolina Tymińska	Poland	14.38	819	
3	Hyleas Fountain	United States	14.06	798	PB
4	Jessica Ennis	Great Britain	14.01	795	SB
5	Marina Goncharova	Russia	13.78	779	
6	Antoinette Nana Djimou Ida	France	13.72	775	
7	Aiga Grabuste	Latvia	12.33	683	SB

=== Long jump ===
Rank	Name	Nationality	Result	Points	Notes
DQ	Tatyana Chernova	Russia	~~6.62~~	~~1046~~	
1	Hyleas Fountain	United States	6.46	994	
2	Jessica Ennis	Great Britain	6.44	988	PB
3	Antoinette Nana Djimou Ida	France	6.34	956	
4	Nataliya Dobrynska	Ukraine	6.33	953	
5	Karolina Tymińska	Poland	6.19	908	
6	Aiga Grabuste	Latvia	6.05	865	
7	Marina Goncharova	Russia	5.92	825	

=== 800 metres ===
Rank	Name	Nationality	Time	Points	Notes
1	Karolina Tymińska	Poland	2:11.16	948	SB
2	Jessica Ennis	Great Britain	2:12.55	928	PB
DQ	Tatyana Chernova	Russia	~~2:13.19~~	~~918~~	
3	Nataliya Dobrynska	Ukraine	2:14.85	895	PB
4	Marina Goncharova	Russia	2:17.69	855	
5	Hyleas Fountain	United States	2:21.02	810	PB
6	Antoinette Nana Djimou Ida	France	2:22.64	788	SB
7	Aiga Grabuste	Latvia	2:23.84	772	SB

=== Final standings ===
Rank	Name	Nationality	Points	Notes
1st place, gold medalist(s)	Jessica Ennis	Great Britain	4937	CR, NR, WL
2nd place, silver medalist(s)	Nataliya Dobrynska	Ukraine	4851	NR
DQ	Tatyana Chernova	Russia	~~4762~~	
3rd place, bronze medalist(s)	Hyleas Fountain	United States	4753	AR
4	Antoinette Nana Djimou Ida	France	4618	
5	Karolina Tymińska	Poland	4575	
6	Marina Goncharova	Russia	4416	
7	Aiga Grabuste	Latvia	4013	SB
