= 2012 European Athletics Championships – Women's heptathlon =

Women's heptathlon at the 2012 European Athletics Championships
- Venue: Helsinki Olympic Stadium
- Location: Helsinki, Finland
- Dates: 29 June; 30 June
- Competitors: 18 from 13 nations
- Winning points: 6544

Medalists
gold medal	Antoinette Nana Djimou Ida	France
silver medal	Laura Ikauniece	Latvia
bronze medal	Aiga Grabuste	Latvia

The women's heptathlon at the 2012 European Athletics Championships was held at the Helsinki Olympic Stadium on 29 and 30 June.

Lyudmyla Yosypenko of Ukraine originally came second with 6416 points and was awarded the silver medal, but she was disqualified for doping in 2013, after her biological passport profile showed she'd been blood doping. All her results from 25 August 2011 onwards were annulled.

Laura Ikauniece (silver) and Aiga Grabuste (bronze) received their medals by mail.

== Medalists ==
Gold	Antoinette Nana Djimou Ida; France
Silver	Laura Ikauniece; Latvia
Bronze	Aiga Grabuste; Latvia

== Records ==
Standing records prior to the 2012 European Athletics Championships
World record	Jackie Joyner-Kersee (USA)	7291	Seoul, South Korea	24 September 1988
European record	Carolina Klüft (SWE)	7032	Osaka, Japan	26 August 2007
Championship record	Jessica Ennis (GBR)	6823	Barcelona, Spain	31 July 2010
World Leading	Jessica Ennis (GBR)	6906	Götzis, Austria	27 May 2012
European Leading	Jessica Ennis (GBR)	6906	Götzis, Austria	27 May 2012

== Schedule ==
Date	Time	Round
29 June 2012	10:40	100 metres hurdles
29 June 2012	11:55	High jump
29 June 2012	14:25	Shot put
29 June 2012	18:20	200 metres
30 June 2012	12:00	Long jump
30 June 2012	14:10	Javelin throw
30 June 2012	19:00	800 metres
30 June 2012		Final standings

== Results ==
=== 100 metres hurdles ===
Wind:
Heat 1: -1.1 m/s, Heat 2: +0.3 m/s, Heat 3: +0.4 m/s

Rank	Heat	Lane	Name	Nationality	Time	Notes	Points
1	3	1	Antoinette Nana Djimou Ida	France	13.11	PB	1108
2	2	6	Grit Šadeiko	Estonia	13.36	PB	1071
DQ	3	7	Lyudmyla Yosypenko	Ukraine	~~13.42~~	~~=PB~~	~~1062~~
3	3	5	Laura Ikauniece	Latvia	13.53	PB	1046
4	2	5	Aiga Grabuste	Latvia	13.66	SB	1027
4	3	4	Ekaterina Bolshova	Russia	13.66		1027
6	2	7	Carolin Schäfer	Germany	13.68	PB	1024
6	2	3	Claudia Rath	Germany	13.68	PB	1024
8	2	2	Blandine Maisonnier	France	13.77		1011
9	1	6	Sofía Ifadídou	Greece	13.82		1004
10	1	4	Remona Fransen	Netherlands	13.88	SB	995
11	3	3	Jessica Samuelsson	Sweden	13.92		990
12	3	6	Yana Panteleyeva	Russia	14.00		978
13	2	4	Eliška Klučinová	Czech Republic	14.03	PB	974
14	1	2	Ida Marcussen	Norway	14.08	SB	967
15	1	3	Györgyi Farkas	Hungary	14.23		946
16	3	2	Sara Aerts	Belgium	14.25		943
17	1	7	Niina Kelo	Finland	14.35	SB	929
18	1	5	Alina Fyodorova	Ukraine	14.49		910

=== High jump ===
Rank	Group	Name	Nationality	1.53	1.56	1.59	1.62	1.65	1.68	1.71	1.74	1.77	1.80	1.83	1.86	1.89	Result	Notes	Points
1	B	Ekaterina Bolshova	Russia	–	–	–	–	–	–	o	o	o	o	xxo	o	xxx	1.86		1054
2	B	Eliška Klučinová	Czech Republic	–	–	–	–	–	–	–	o	o	o	o	xxx		1.83		1016
3	B	Laura Ikauniece	Latvia	–	–	–	–	–	–	o	o	o	o	xo	xxx		1.83	PB	1016
4	A	Remona Fransen	Netherlands	–	–	–	–	–	–	o	o	o	o	xxx			1.80		978
5	B	Alina Fyodorova	Ukraine	–	–	–	o	–	o	o	xo	o	o	xxx			1.80		978
6	B	Blandine Maisonnier	France	–	–	–	–	–	–	o	o	o	xxo	xxx			1.80		978
6	B	Györgyi Farkas	Hungary	–	–	–	–	o	–	o	–	o	xxo	xxx			1.80		978
8	B	Claudia Rath	Germany	–	–	–	–	o	o	o	o	o	xxx				1.77	SB	941
9	A	Grit Šadeiko	Estonia	–	–	–	–	o	o	o	xo	o	xxx				1.77		941
10	A	Jessica Samuelsson	Sweden	–	–	–	–	o	o	o	xxo	o	xxx				1.77	PB	941
10	B	Antoinette Nana Djimou Ida	France	–	–	–	–	–	–	xo	xo	o	xxx				1.77		941
12	B	Yana Panteleyeva	Russia	–	–	–	–	–	o	o	o	xxo	xxx				1.77	PB	941
DQ	B	Lyudmyla Yosypenko	Ukraine	–	–	–	xo	o	o	o	xo	xxo	xxx				~~1.77~~		~~941~~
13	A	Aiga Grabuste	Latvia	–	–	–	–	o	–	o	xo	xxx					1.74		903
14	A	Carolin Schäfer	Germany	–	–	–	–	o	o	o	xxo	xxx					1.74		903
15	A	Ida Marcussen	Norway	–	–	–	o	o	xo	xxo	xxx						1.71	SB	867
16	A	Sofía Ifadídou	Greece	–	o	o	o	o	xxx								1.65		795
17	A	Niina Kelo	Finland	o	o	o	o	xxo	xxx								1.65	=SB	795
	A	Sara Aerts	Belgium														DNS		0

=== Shot put ===
Rank	Group	Name	Nationality	#1	#2	#3	Result	Notes	Points
1	B	Niina Kelo	Finland	14.28	14.96	15.06	15.06	SB	865
2	B	Jessica Samuelsson	Sweden	x	14.61	14.91	14.91	SB	855
3	B	Alina Fyodorova	Ukraine	14.39	14.71	14.48	14.71	PB	841
DQ	B	Lyudmyla Yosypenko	Ukraine	~~14.32~~	~~x~~	~~14.06~~	~~14.32~~	~~PB~~	~~815~~
4	B	Eliška Klučinová	Czech Republic	12.46	14.21	x	14.21	SB	808
5	A	Aiga Grabuste	Latvia	13.52	x	13.14	13.52		762
6	B	Antoinette Nana Djimou Ida	France	13.48	x	x	13.48		759
7	A	Ida Marcussen	Norway	13.23	13.10	13.29	13.29		747
8	A	Remona Fransen	Netherlands	13.11	12.89	13.16	13.16		738
9	B	Yana Panteleyeva	Russia	12.78	13.01	x	13.01		728
10	A	Claudia Rath	Germany	12.16	12.58	12.88	12.88		719
11	B	Carolin Schäfer	Germany	x	12.70	12.06	12.70		707
12	A	Sofía Ifadídou	Greece	11.95	12.56	12.65	12.65		704
13	A	Györgyi Farkas	Hungary	12.51	12.62	12.35	12.62		702
14	A	Grit Šadeiko	Estonia	12.32	12.14	12.56	12.56	PB	698
15	B	Ekaterina Bolshova	Russia	12.36	12.28	12.07	12.36		685
16	A	Blandine Maisonnier	France	11.54	12.22	x	12.22		676
17	A	Laura Ikauniece	Latvia	11.28	11.34	11.81	11.81		649
	B	Sara Aerts	Belgium				DNS		0

=== 200 metres ===
Wind:
Heat 1: 0.0 m/s, Heat 2: -0.5 m/s, Heat 3: -0.4 m/s

Rank	Heat	Lane	Name	Nationality	Time	Notes	Points
1	1	7	Grit Šadeiko	Estonia	24.10	PB	971
DQ	3	2	Lyudmyla Yosypenko	Ukraine	~~24.14~~		~~967~~
2	3	6	Carolin Schäfer	Germany	24.19	PB	963
3	3	7	Jessica Samuelsson	Sweden	24.30		952
4	3	5	Ekaterina Bolshova	Russia	24.32		950
5	3	4	Laura Ikauniece	Latvia	24.36	PB	946
6	1	2	Aiga Grabuste	Latvia	24.47		936
7	2	3	Antoinette Nana Djimou Ida	France	24.52	SB	931
8	3	8	Claudia Rath	Germany	24.54	SB	929
9	2	6	Eliška Klučinová	Czech Republic	24.56	PB	928
10	1	3	Remona Fransen	Netherlands	24.59		925
11	2	2	Blandine Maisonnier	France	24.90		896
12	2	5	Ida Marcussen	Norway	25.14	SB	874
13	2	7	Alina Fyodorova	Ukraine	25.27		862
14	2	4	Yana Panteleyeva	Russia	25.60		833
15	1	4	Sofía Ifadídou	Greece	25.62	SB	831
16	1	6	Györgyi Farkas	Hungary	25.74		820
17	1	5	Niina Kelo	Finland	26.12	SB	787
	3	3	Sara Aerts	Belgium	DNS		0

=== Long jump ===
Rank	Group	Name	Nationality	#1	#2	#3	Result	Notes	Points
1	A	Aiga Grabuste	Latvia	6.46	6.42	x	6.46		994
2	B	Antoinette Nana Djimou Ida	France	6.32	6.28	6.42	6.42	PB	981
3	A	Claudia Rath	Germany	6.42	x	6.17	6.42	SB	981
4	B	Laura Ikauniece	Latvia	6.28	6.31	x	6.31	PB	946
5	A	Ekaterina Bolshova	Russia	6.22	6.14	6.30	6.30		943
6	A	Blandine Maisonnier	France	6.27	x	5.25	6.27		934
7	B	Jessica Samuelsson	Sweden	6.02	6.18	x	6.18	SB	905
8	B	Grit Šadeiko	Estonia	5.97	6.05	6.18	6.18		905
9	B	Ida Marcussen	Norway	6.18	6.14	5.84	6.18	SB	905
DQ	A	Lyudmyla Yosypenko	Ukraine	~~6.03~~	~~6.08~~	~~6.14~~	~~6.14~~		~~893~~
10	A	Alina Fyodorova	Ukraine	x	x	6.11	6.11		883
11	A	Eliška Klučinová	Czech Republic	6.09	5.81	6.09	6.09		877
12	B	Remona Fransen	Netherlands	x	6.00	6.03	6.03		859
13	A	Györgyi Farkas	Hungary	5.80	x	5.92	5.92		825
14	B	Carolin Schäfer	Germany	5.71	5.91	5.83	5.91	SB	822
15	B	Niina Kelo	Finland	5.46	5.58	5.55	5.58	=SB	723
16	B	Sofía Ifadídou	Greece	5.52	x	–	5.52		706
	A	Yana Panteleyeva	Russia	x	x	x	NM		0

=== Javelin throw ===
Rank	Group	Name	Nationality	#1	#2	#3	Result	Notes	Points
1	A	Antoinette Nana Djimou Ida	France	55.82	43.67	47.79	55.82	PB	973
DQ	A	Lyudmyla Yosypenko	Ukraine	~~49.61~~	~~49.01~~	~~x~~	~~49.61~~	~~SB~~	~~853~~
2	A	Niina Kelo	Finland	45.50	49.02	47.69	49.02		841
3	A	Carolin Schäfer	Germany	48.81	x	x	48.81		837
4	A	Laura Ikauniece	Latvia	x	46.38	47.32	47.32		808
5	B	Ida Marcussen	Norway	44.10	x	46.03	46.03	SB	783
6	B	Aiga Grabuste	Latvia	45.85	x	x	45.85		780
7	A	Györgyi Farkas	Hungary	43.13	45.81	43.65	45.81	SB	779
8	A	Grit Šadeiko	Estonia	44.27	44.86	45.38	45.38		771
9	A	Eliška Klučinová	Czech Republic	42.58	x	x	42.58		717
10	B	Ekaterina Bolshova	Russia	33.31	40.47	x	40.47	PB	676
11	B	Claudia Rath	Germany	32.51	34.06	39.99	39.99		667
12	B	Blandine Maisonnier	France	37.55	37.40	38.96	38.96		647
13	B	Yana Panteleyeva	Russia	38.45	x	x	38.45		638
14	B	Jessica Samuelsson	Sweden	37.04	38.34	35.59	38.34		635
15	B	Alina Fyodorova	Ukraine	35.03	36.09	38.12	38.12	SB	631
16	B	Remona Fransen	Netherlands	33.78	32.42	34.78	34.78		567
	A	Sofía Ifadídou	Greece				DNS		0

=== 800 metres ===
Rank	Heat	Lane	Name	Nationality	Result	Notes	Points
1	2	8	Jessica Samuelsson	Sweden	2:08.70	SB	984
2	2	2	Ekaterina Bolshova	Russia	2:10.10	PB	963
3	1	6	Claudia Rath	Germany	2:11.09		949
4	1	4	Ida Marcussen	Norway	2:12.36	SB	930
5	2	4	Laura Ikauniece	Latvia	2:12.82	PB	924
6	2	6	Aiga Grabuste	Latvia	2:12.90	PB	923
7	1	1	Remona Fransen	Netherlands	2:14.37		902
8	1	8	Blandine Maisonnier	France	2:16.86		867
DQ	2	3	Lyudmyla Yosypenko	Ukraine	~~2:17.63~~		~~856~~
9	1	3	Alina Fyodorova	Ukraine	2:17.77		854
10	2	5	Antoinette Nana Djimou Ida	France	2:17.99	SB	851
11	2	7	Eliška Klučinová	Czech Republic	2:19.47		831
12	1	5	Györgyi Farkas	Hungary	2:19.93		824
13	1	7	Niina Kelo	Finland	2:25.38		752
14	1	2	Carolin Schäfer	Germany	2:25.79		747
	1	7	Yana Panteleyeva	Russia	DNS		0
	2	1	Grit Šadeiko	Estonia	DNS		0

=== Final standings ===
Rank	Name	Nationality	Points	Notes
1st place, gold medalist(s)	Antoinette Nana Djimou Ida	France	6544	PB
DQ	Lyudmyla Yosypenko	Ukraine	~~6387~~	Doping
2nd place, silver medalist(s)	Laura Ikauniece	Latvia	6335	PB
3rd place, bronze medalist(s)	Aiga Grabuste	Latvia	6325	
4	Ekaterina Bolshova	Russia	6298	
5	Jessica Samuelsson	Sweden	6262	PB
6	Claudia Rath	Germany	6210	PB
7	Eliška Klučinová	Czech Republic	6151	
8	Ida Marcussen	Norway	6073	SB
9	Blandine Maisonnier	France	6009	
10	Carolin Schäfer	Germany	6003	
11	Remona Fransen	Netherlands	5964	
12	Alina Fyodorova	Ukraine	5959	
13	Györgyi Farkas	Hungary	5874	
14	Niina Kelo	Finland	5692	
	Grit Šadeiko	Estonia	DNF	
	Yana Panteleyeva	Russia	DNF	
	Sofía Ifadídou	Greece	DNF	
	Sara Aerts	Belgium	DNF	
