= Remona Fransen =

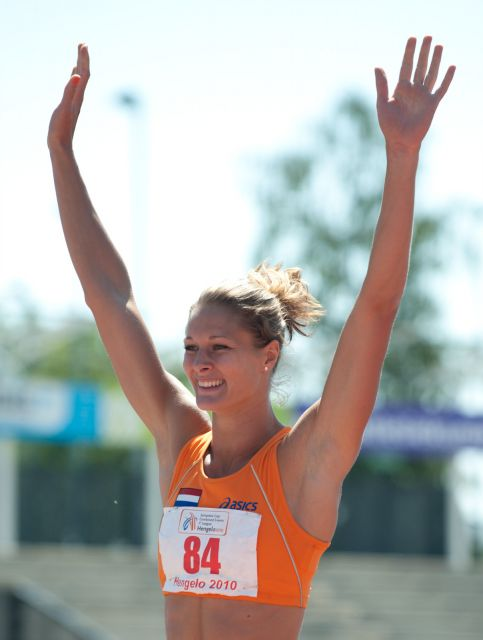
- Fransen during 2010 European Cup Meerkamp.

Personal information
- Born: November 25, 1985 (age 40) Dordrecht, Netherlands
- Height: 1.90 m (6 ft 3 in)
- Weight: 72 kg (159 lb)

Sport
- Country: Netherlands
- Sport: Athletics
- Event(s): Heptathlon, pentathlon

Achievements and titles
- Personal best: Heptathlon 5,993 points Pentathlon 4,665 points
Medal record
Women's athletics
Representing the Netherlands
European Indoor Championships
Bronze medal – third place	2011 Paris	Pentathlon

Remona Fransen (born November 25, 1985) is a Dutch athlete, specialising in multi-eventing disciplines.

At the 2011 European Indoor Championships in Athletics in Paris, Fransen won her first major international medal in the pentathlon with a points total of 4,665. En route to her pentathlon bronze, she broke the Dutch indoor record in the high jump with a height of 1.92 m.

== Major competitive record ==
Year	Competition	Venue	Position	Event	Notes
2011	European Indoor Championships	Paris, France	3rd	Pentathlon	4665 points
2011	European Indoor Championships	Daegu, South Korea	19th	Heptathlon	6027 points
2012	European Championships	Helsinki, Finland	12th	Heptathlon	5964 points
2013	European Indoor Championships	Gothenburg, Sweden	4th	Pentathlon	4571 points
