= Marina Goncharova =

Russian heptathlete

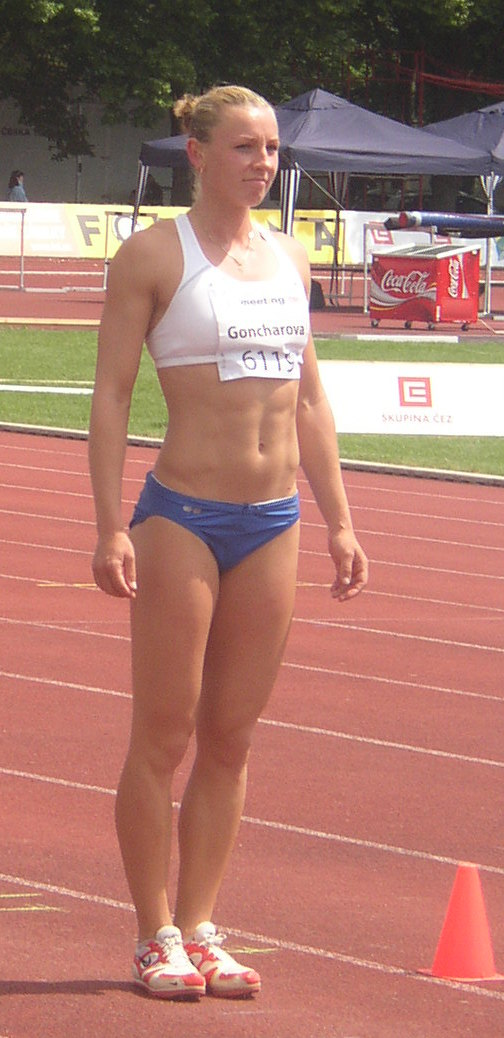
Marina Goncharova at the 2010 TNT - Fortuna Meeting in Kladno

Marina Vasilyevna Goncharova (Russian: Марина Василевна Гончарова; née Ponyarova; born 26 April 1986) is a Russian heptathlete. She was born in Kemerovo.

== Biography ==
Marina Vasilievna Goncharova was born on April 26, 1986, in Novokuznetsk. Later she moved to Kemerovo, where she trained under the guidance of Anatoly Mikhailovich Kanashevich.

She made her international debut in 2003 at the World Youth Championships in Canada, where she took third place. She participated in the World Championships, European Championships and other international competitions. Until 2011, she was a member of the Russian national track and field team.

== Achievements ==
| Year | Competition | Venue | Position | Event | Notes |
Representing Russia
| 2003 | World Youth Championships | Sherbrooke, Canada | 3rd | Heptathlon Girls | 5338 |
| 2004 | World Junior Championships | Grosseto, Italy | 6th | Heptathlon | 5599 pts |
| 2007 | European U23 Championships | Debrecen, Hungary | 5th | Heptathlon | 6004 pts |
| 2008 | Hypo-Meeting | Götzis, Austria | 6th | Heptathlon | 6319 |
| 2009 | Hypo-Meeting | Götzis, Austria | 17th | Heptathlon | 5104 |
| 2010 | World Indoor Championships | Doha, Qatar | 7th | Pentathlon | 4416 |
| 2010 | TNT – Fortuna Meeting | Kladno, Czech Republic | 2nd | Heptathlon | 6182 |
| 2010 | European Championships | Barcelona, Spain | 8th | Heptathlon | 6186 |
| 2011 | European Indoor Championships | Paris, France | 6th | Pentathlon | 4469 |
