= Eliška Klučinová =

Czech heptathlete

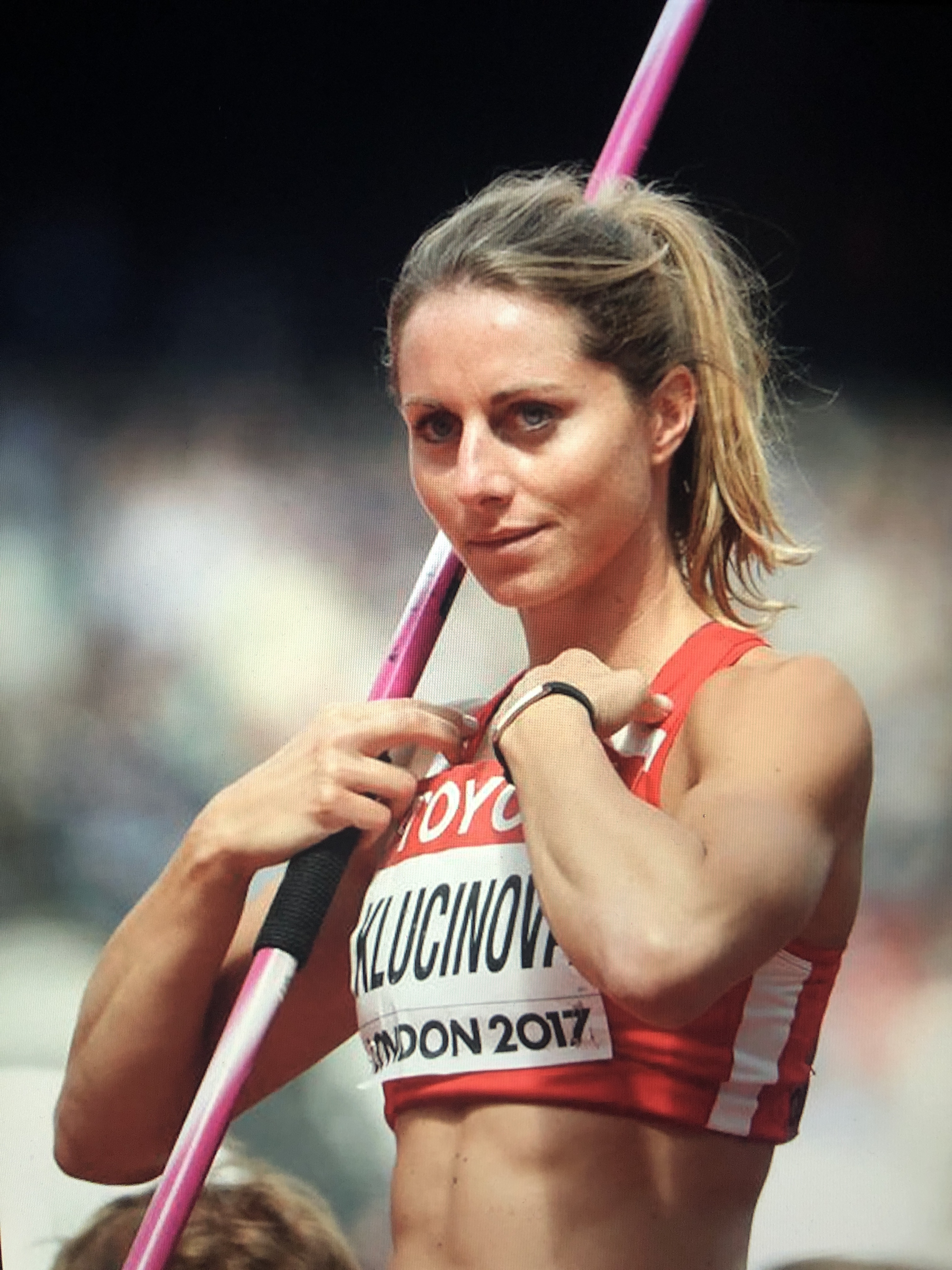
- Klučinová during 2017 World Championships in Athletics

Personal information
- Born: 14 April 1988 (age 38) Prague, Czechoslovakia
- Height: 1.79 m (5 ft 10 in)

Sport
- Country: Czech Republic
- Sport: Athletics
- Event: Heptathlon

Achievements and titles
- Olympic finals: 18th at the 2012 Summer Olympics
- World finals: 23rd at the 2009 World Championships in Athletics
- Regional finals: 7th at the 2010 European Athletics Championships
- Personal bests: 200 m: 24.41 (May 2016); 800 m: 2:12.50 (August 2013); 100 m hurdles: 13.77 (June 2012); High jump: 1.90 (June 2014); Long jump: 6.43 (June 2014); Shot put: 15.21 (May 2016); Javelin: 51.09 (August 2015); Heptathlon: 6460 (June 2014)
Medal record
Women's athletics
Representing Czech Republic
European Indoor Championships
Bronze medal – third place	2015 Prague	Pentathlon
TNT – Fortuna Meeting
Gold medal – first place	2014 Kladno	Heptathlon
Gold medal – first place	2012 Kladno	Heptathlon
Gold medal – first place	2010 Kladno	Heptathlon
European Junior Championships
Silver medal – second place	2007 Hengelo	Heptathlon

Eliška Klučinová (Czech pronunciation: [ˈɛlɪʃka ˈklutʃɪnovaː]; born 14 April 1988) is a Czech heptathlete. In 2007, she won a silver medal at the European Athletics Junior Championships in Hengelo.

== Career ==
At the 2007 European Athletics Junior Championships in Hengelo, Klučinová finished second in the heptathlon with a points total of 5709.

At the 2009 World Championships in Athletics in Berlin, Klučinová placed 23rd overall in the heptathlon with 5505 points.

Klučinová equalled the 22-year-old national record in heptathlon with a points total of 6268 at the 2010 TNT – Fortuna Meeting in Kladno. Klučinová was nine weeks old when Zuzana Lajbnerová set the record in 1988. Two years later, at the same meet, she was able to break the national record with a total of 6283 points. She has since set two new national records.

== Achievements ==
Year	Competition	Venue	Position	Event	Notes
Representing the Czech Republic
2005	World Youth Championships	Marrakesh, Morocco	8th	Heptathlon	5249
2006	World Junior Championships	Beijing, China	8th	Heptathlon	5468 pts, PB
2007	European Junior Championships	Hengelo, Netherlands	2nd	Heptathlon	5709
2009	European U23 Championships	Kaunas, Lithuania	4th	Heptathlon	6015 pts, PB
2009	World Championships	Berlin, Germany	23rd	Heptathlon	5505 pts
2010	TNT – Fortuna Meeting	Kladno, Czech Republic	1st	Heptathlon	6268, =NR
2010	European Championships	Barcelona, Spain	7th	Heptathlon	6187 pts
2012	TNT – Fortuna Meeting	Kladno, Czech Republic	1st	Heptathlon	6283, NR
2012	European Championships	Helsinki, Finland	8th	Heptathlon	6151 pts
2012	Olympic Games	London, United Kingdom	18th	Heptathlon	6109 pts
2014	TNT – Fortuna Meeting	Kladno, Czech Republic	1st	Heptathlon	6460, NR
2014	European Championships	Zurich, Switzerland	–	Heptathlon	DNF
2015	European Indoor Championships	Prague, Czech Republic	3rd	Pentathlon	4687 pts NR
2015	World Championships	Beijing, China	13th	Heptathlon	6247 pts
2016	Olympic Games	Rio de Janeiro, Brazil	22nd	Heptathlon	6077 pts
2017	World Championships	London, United Kingdom	10th	Heptathlon	6313 pts
2018	World Indoor Championships	Birmingham, United Kingdom	4th	Pentathlon	4579 pts
2019	European Indoor Championships	Glasgow, United Kingdom	10th	Pentathlon	3518 pts
