= Lyudmyla Yosypenko =

Ukrainian heptathlete (born 1984)

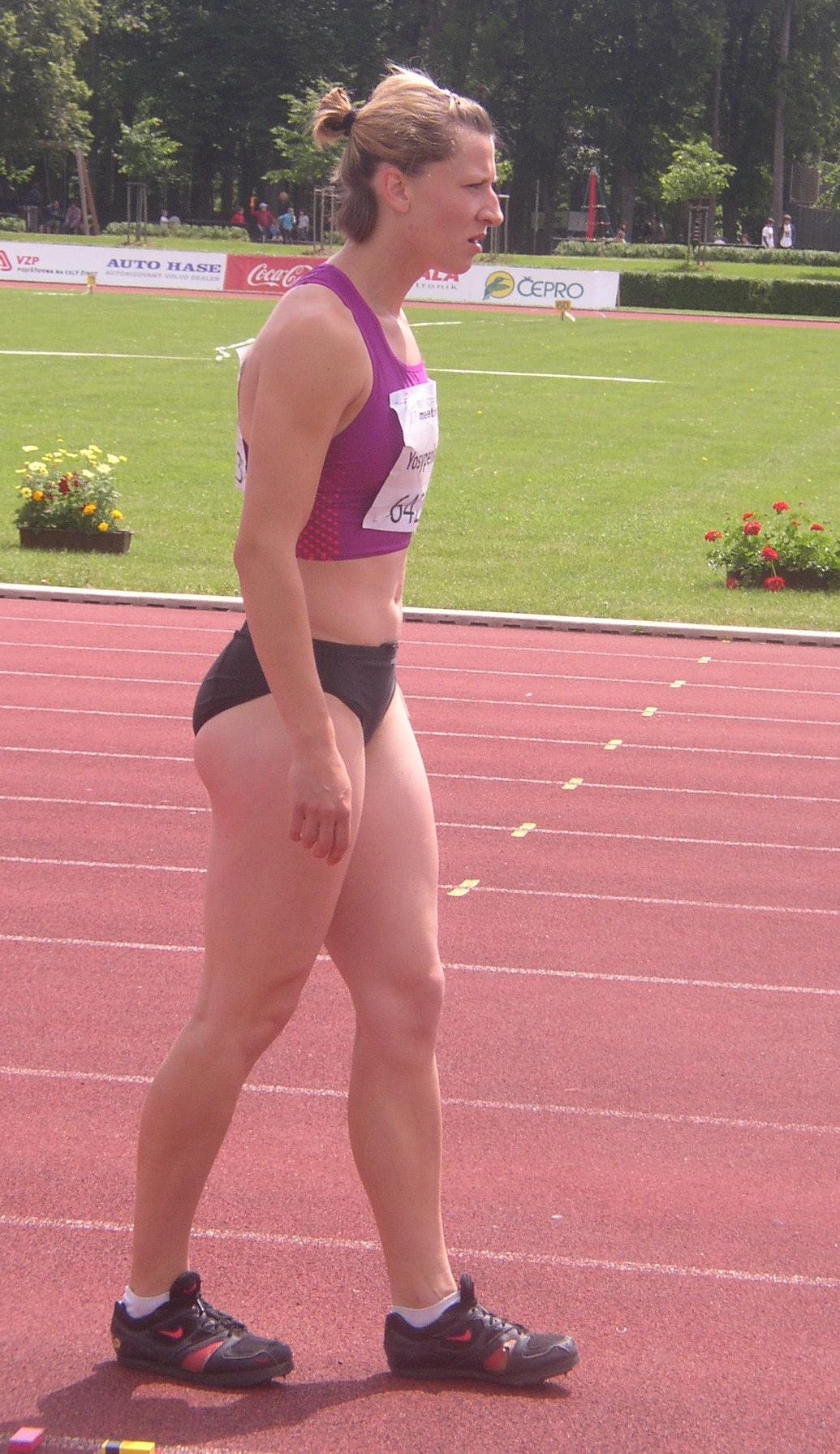
- Lyudmyla Yosypenko during the 2010 TNT - Fortuna Meeting in Kladno

Personal information
- Native name: Людмила Дмитрівна Йосипенко
- Full name: Lyudmyla Dmytrivna Yosypenko
- Born: 24 September 1984 (age 41) Yahotyn, Kiev Oblast, Ukrainian SSR, Soviet Union
- Height: 1.75 m (5 ft 9 in)
- Weight: 69 kg (152 lb)

Sport
- Country: Ukraine
- Sport: Track and field
- Event: Heptathlon
Medal record
European Championships
Disqualified	2012 Helsinki	Heptathlon

Lyudmyla Dmytrivna Yosypenko (Ukrainian: Людмила Дмитрівна Йосипенко; born 24 September 1984) is a Ukrainian heptathlete.

== Career ==
She came fourth at the 2012 London Olympics with a personal best of 6618 points. She was the winner of the Decastar competition that September.

In December 2012, the World Anti-Doping Agency notified Yosypenko that levels of haemoglobin in blood samples she had given differed from those described in her biological passport. She competed in the Ukrainian national championships in July 2013, but the Ukrainian Athletic Federation disqualified her the following day and imposed a four-year ban. Yosypenko protested, saying the changes in her haemoglobin levels were a result of medical treatments and that she would appeal the ban. The IAAF confirmed the ban in September 2013. Her results from 25 August 2011 onwards were disqualified.

== Achievements ==
Year	Competition	Venue	Position	Event	Notes
Representing Ukraine
2009	Hypo-Meeting	Götzis, Austria	3rd	Heptathlon	6361
2009	World Championships	Berlin, Germany	5th	Heptathlon	6416
2010	TNT – Fortuna Meeting	Kladno, Czech Republic	3rd	Heptathlon	6142
2010	European Championships	Barcelona, Spain	6th	Heptathlon	6206
2012	European Championships	Helsinki, Finland	DSQ (2nd)	Heptathlon	DSQ (6416)
2012	Olympic Games	London, United Kingdom	DSQ (4th)	Heptathlon	DSQ (6618 (PB))
