= Karolina Tymińska =

Polish heptathlete (born 1984)

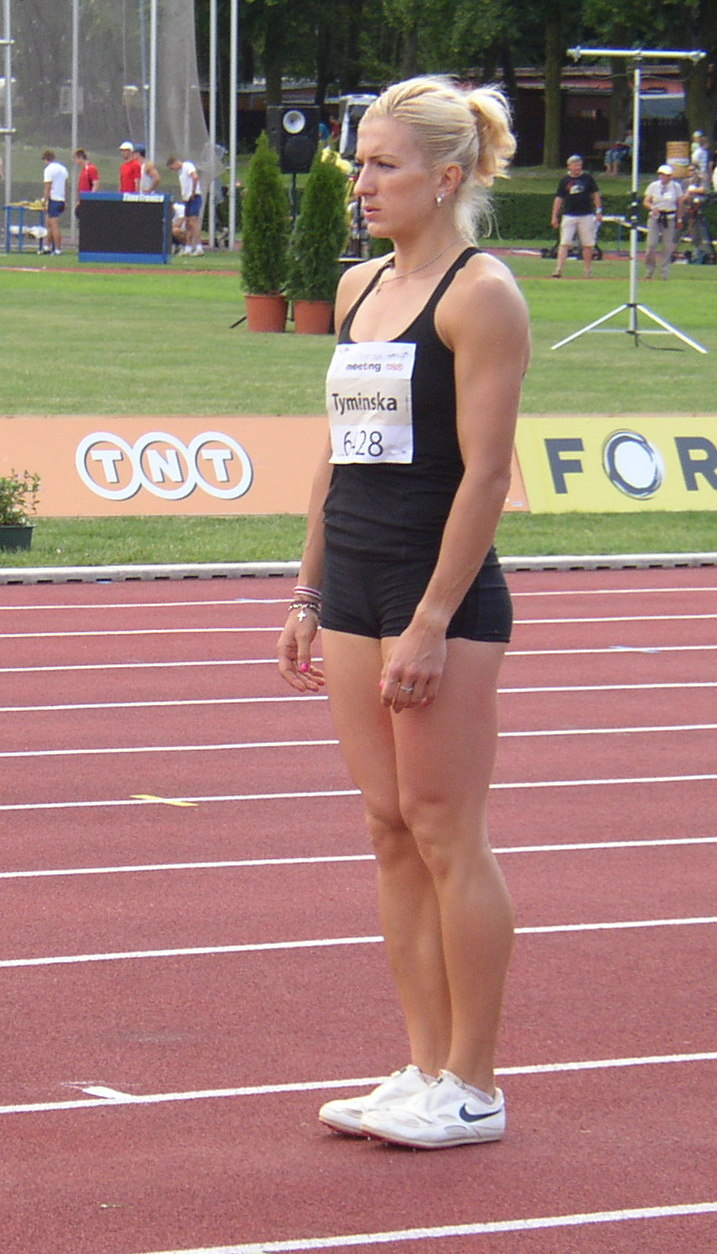
- Karolina Tymińska in 2011

Personal information
- Nationality: Poland
- Born: 4 October 1984 (age 41) Świebodzin, Poland
- Height: 1.75 m (5 ft 9 in)
- Weight: 69 kg (152 lb) (2012)

Sport
- Sport: Athletics
- Event: Heptathlon
- Club: SKLA Sopot
Medal record
World Championships
Bronze medal – third place	2011 Daegu	Heptathlon

Karolina Tymińska (born 4 October 1984) is a Polish heptathlete. She has represented Poland twice at the Olympic Games (2008 and 2012) and three times at the World Championships in Athletics (2007, 2009 and 2011). She is the bronze medalist in the heptathlon from the 2011 World Championships in Athletics, having originally come fourth in the event before the disqualification, in 2016, of Tatyana Chernova.

Tymińska also regularly competes in the indoor pentathlon event: at the IAAF World Indoor Championships she placed fourth in 2012 and sixth in both 2008 and 2010.

Her personal best in indoor pentathlon result is 4769 points, achieved in July 2008 in Spała. In heptathlon her personal best result is 6544 achieved in August 2011 in Daegu.

She won the European Cup Combined Events title in 2013 with a score of 6347 points, defeating Hanna Melnychenko and setting a javelin throw best of 42.40 m. She placed second at the Decastar meeting with 6288 points.

== Achievements ==
Year	Competition	Venue	Position	Event	Notes
Representing Poland
2001	World Youth Championships	Debrecen, Hungary	8th	Heptathlon (youth)	5023 pts
2005	European Indoor Championships	Madrid, Spain	8th	Pentathlon	4374 pts
2005	European U23 Championships	Erfurt, Germany	—	Heptathlon	DNF
2006	Hypo-Meeting	Götzis, Austria	6th	Heptathlon	6234 pts
2006	European Championships	Gothenburg, Sweden	17 (q)	Long jump	6.34 m
2006	European Championships	Gothenburg, Sweden	–	Heptathlon	DNF
2007	European Indoor Championships	Birmingham, England	7th	Pentathlon	4494 pts
2007	Hypo-Meeting	Götzis, Austria	9th	Heptathlon	6164 pts
2007	World Championships	Osaka, Japan	15th	Heptathlon	6092 pts
2008	World Indoor Championships	Valencia, Spain	6th	Pentathlon	4580 pts
2008	Hypo-Meeting	Götzis, Austria	4th	Heptathlon	6351 pts
2008	Olympic Games	Beijing, PR China	7th	Heptathlon	6428 pts
2009	European Indoor Championships	Turin, Italy	5th	Pentathlon	4542 pts
2009	World Championships	Berlin, Germany	–	Heptathlon	DNF
2010	World Indoor Championships	Doha, Qatar	6th	Pentathlon	4575 pts
2010	European Championships	Barcelona, Spain	5th	Heptathlon	6230 pts
2011	European Indoor Championships	Paris, France	4th	Pentathlon	4612 pts
2011	World Championships	Daegu, South Korea	3rd	Heptathlon	6544 pts
2012	World Indoor Championships	Istanbul, Turkey	4th	Pentathlon	4725 pts
2012	Olympic Games	London, United Kingdom	–	Heptathlon	DNF
2013	World Championships	Moscow, Russia	9th	Heptathlon	6270 pts
2014	World Indoor Championships	Sopot, Poland	8th	Pentathlon	4557 pts
2014	European Championships	Zürich, Switzerland	11th	Heptathlon	6132 pts
2015	World Championships	Beijing, China	20th	Heptathlon	5948 pts
