= 2013 European Cup Combined Events =

- Organisers: IAAF
- Edition: 30th
- Date: 29–30 June
- Host city: Tallinn, Estonia; Nottwil, Lucerne, Switzerland; Ribeira Brava, Madeira, Portugal
- Venue: Kadriorg Stadium; Sport Arena Nottwil; Estadio de Camara de Lobos
- Participation: 64 / 56 / 35 athletes from 8 / 7 / 9 nations

The 2013 European Cup Combined Events were held in Tallinn, Estonia, at the Kadriorg Stadium (Super league), in Nottwil, Lucerne, Switzerland, at the Sport Arena Nottwil (First league), and in Ribeira Brava, Madeira, Portugal, at the Estadio de Camara de Lobos (Second league), on 29–30 June 2013.

== Super league ==
Detailed reports on the event and an appraisal of the results were given.

Complete results were published.

=== Medallists ===
Event	Gold		Silver		Bronze	
Men's Decathlon	Kevin Mayer; France	8390	Eduard Mikhan; Belarus	8125	Mikk Pahapill; Estonia	8099
Women's Heptathlon	Karolina Tymińska; Poland	6347	Hanna Melnychenko; Ukraine	6260	Grit Šadeiko; Estonia	6221
Overall team	France	41421	Russia	41032	Estonia	41027

=== Results ===
==== Overall Team ====
Teams relegated to the first league are highlighted in light red

Place	Country	Points
1st place, gold medalist(s)	France	41421 pts
2nd place, silver medalist(s)	Russia	41032 pts
3rd place, bronze medalist(s)	Estonia	41027 pts
4	Belarus	40175 pts
5	Poland	38763 pts
6	United Kingdom	38653 pts
7	Ukraine	37850 pts
8	Italy	37617 pts

==== Men's Decathlon ====
Key

The highest mark recorded in each event is highlighted in yellow

Rank	Athlete	Overall points	100 m	LJ	SP	HJ	400 m	110 m H	DT	PV	JT	1500 m
1st place, gold medalist(s)	Kevin Mayer; France	8390	852; 11.04 s w:+1.4	967; 7.63 m w:+1.2	787; 14.95 m	840; 2.04 m	838; 49.50 s	925; 14.39 s w:+2.7	765; 44.89 m	880; 4.90 m	738; 60.04 m	798; 4:21.95 min
2nd place, silver medalist(s)	Eduard Mikhan; Belarus	8125 SB	894; 10.85 s w:+1.4	927; 7.47 m w:+0.9	752; 14.38 m	813; 2.01 m	859; 49.05 s	900; 14.59 s w:+2.7	836; 48.36 m	819; 4.70 m	567; 48.53 m	758; 4:27.94 min
3rd place, bronze medalist(s)	Mikk Pahapill; Estonia	8099	801; 11.27 s w:+1.4	896; 7.34 m w:0.0	732; 14.06 m	785; 1.98 m	791; 50.52 s	900; 14.59 s w:+2.7	830; 48.08 m	880; 4.90 m	793; 63.63 m	691; 4:38.31 min
4	Artem Lukyanenko; Russia	8067	852; 11.04 s w:+1.4	826; 7.05 m w:+0.4	757; 14.46 m	785; 1.98 m	780; 50.75 s	949; 14.20 s w:+2.7	751; 44.25 m	941; 5.10 m	779; 62.73 m	647; 4:45.37 min
5	Florian Geffrouais; France	7990 SB	834; 11.12 s w:-0.2	814; 7.00 m w:-0.1	814; 15.39 m	731; 1.92 m	878; 48.64 s	862; 14.90 s w:+1.4	709; 42.19 m	731; 4.40 m	765; 61.82 m	852; 4:14.18 min
6	Andres Raja; Estonia	7909 SB	856; 11.02 s w:-0.1	809; 6.98 m w:-0.1	784; 14.90 m	813; 2.01 m	792; 50.49 s	975; 14.00 s w:+2.0	766; 44.94 m	790; 4.60 m	714; 58.44 m	610; 4:51.44 min
7	Jérémy Leliévre; France	7880 SB	890; 10.87 s w:-0.1	783; 6.87 m w:+0.3	777; 14.79 m	705; 1.89 m	917; 47.83 s	900; 14.59 s w:+2.0	754; 44.37 m	760; 4.50 m	604; 51.03 m	790; 4:23.19 min
8	Yevgeny Sarantsev; Russia	7672	784; 11.35 s w:-0.2	774; 6.83 m w:-0.8	789; 14.99 m	813; 2.01 m	743; 51.58 s	809; 15.34 s w:+1.4	726; 43.01 m	849; 4.80 m	731; 59.55 m	654; 4:44.26 min
9	Kaarel Jõeväli; Estonia	7658 PB	856; 11.02 s w:-0.2	945; 7.54 m w:-0.7	683; 13.26 m	813; 2.01 m	830; 49.67 s	874; 14.80 s w:+1.4	636; 38.57 m	790; 4.60 m	580; 49.40 m	651; 4:44.66 min
10	Ivan Grigoryev; Russia	7602	836; 11.11 s w:-0.1	783; 6.87 m w:-0.3	687; 13.32 m	705; 1.89 m	831; 49.65 s	840; 15.08 s w:+2.0	510; 32.32 m	849; 4.80 m	774; 62.38 m	787; 4:23.60 min
11	Mikalai Shubianok; Belarus	7590 SB	738; 11.57 s w:-0.2	790; 6.90 m w:+0.4	793; 15.05 m	785; 1.98 m	748; 51.47 s	857; 14.94 s w:+1.4	766; 44.98 m	790; 4.60 m	638; 53.30 m	685; 4:39.29 min
12	Vasyl Ivanytskyi; Ukraine	7558 PB	854; 11.03 s w:+1.4	1005; 7.78 m w:+0.2	662; 12.91 m	813; 2.01 m	757; 51.28 s	837; 15.10 s w:+2.7	677; 40.59 m	702; 4.30 m	639; 53.42 m	612; 4:51.04 min
13	Krzysztof Plaskota; Poland	7474 SB	791; 11.32 s w:-0.2	871; 7.24 m w:+0.7	763; 14.57 m	758; 1.95 m	742; 51.61 s	839; 15.09 s w:+1.4	738; 43.60 m	673; 4.20 m	702; 57.61 m	597; 4:53.58 min
14	John Lane; United Kingdom	7468	910; 10.78 s w:+1.4	852; 7.16 m w:+1.0	716; 13.80 m	731; 1.92 m	906; 48.07 s	918; 14.44 s w:+2.7	656; 39.57 m	760; 4.50 m	490; 43.28 m	529; 5:05.44 min
15	Michele Calvi; Italy	7466	892; 10.86 s w:+1.4	693; 6.48 m w:+0.2	745; 14.28 m	653; 1.83 m	772; 50.93 s	962; 14.10 s w:+2.7	763; 44.80 m	673; 4.20 m	759; 61.41 m	554; 5:01.03 min
16	Aliaksandr Korzun; Belarus	7372 SB	827; 11.15 s w:-0.5	713; 6.57 m w:+0.1	661; 12.89 m	813; 2.01 m	813; 50.04 s	860; 14.91 s w:+0.7	654; 39.49 m	760; 4.50 m	663; 55.02 m	608; 4:51.70 min
17	Martin Brockman; United Kingdom	7310	740; 11.56 s w:-0.2	816; 7.01 m w:+0.2	691; 13.39 m	813; 2.01 m	802; 50.28 s	792; 15.48 s w:+1.4	750; 44.16 m	617; 4.00 m	529; 45.93 m	760; 4:27.65 min
18	Marcin Przybył; Poland	7278	750; 11.51 s w:-0.1	774; 6.83 m w:+0.1	732; 14.06 m	813; 2.01 m	702; 52.52 s	839; 15.09 s w:+2.0	759; 44.64 m	673; 4.20 m	678; 56.00 m	558; 5:00.31 min
19	Simone Cairoli; Italy	7169 PB	841; 11.09 s w:-0.2	920; 7.44 m w:+0.2	600; 11.89 m	840; 2.04 m	754; 51.34 s	809; 15.34 s w:+1.4	534; 33.49 m	673; 4.20 m	505; 44.29 m	693; 4:38.06 min
20	Mateusz Chmieliński; Poland	7148 SB	810; 11.23 s w:+1.4	621; 6.16 m w:-0.2	583; 11.62 m	758; 1.95 m	783; 50.70 s	801; 15.41 s w:+2.7	655; 39.53 m	760; 4.50 m	627; 52.56 m	750; 4:29.13 min
21	Gianluca Simionato; Italy	6986	744; 11.54 s w:-0.1	723; 6.61 m w:+0.6	654; 12.79 m	705; 1.89 m	693; 52.73 s	760; 15.76 s w:+2.0	707; 42.08 m	645; 4.10 m	693; 57.01 m	662; 4:42.98 min
22	Serhiy Chemerys; Ukraine	6914	689; 11.81 s w:-0.2	816; 7.01 m w:+0.8	703; 13.59 m	813; 2.01 m	588; 55.28 s	794; 15.47 s w:+1.4	651; 39.32 m	702; 4.30 m	587; 49.92 m	571; 4:58.07 min
23	Francis Baker; United Kingdom	6871	776; 11.39 s w:-0.5	845; 7.13 m w:-0.4	583; 11.62 m	785; 1.98 m	757; 51.26 s	874; 14.80 s w:+0.7	343; 23.73 m	731; 4.40 m	501; 44.06 m	676; 4:40.76 min
24	Mikhail Logvinenko; Russia	6771	782; 11.36 s w:-0.5	811; 6.99 m w:-0.2	728; 13.99 m	813; 2.01 m	832; 49.62 s	941; 14.26 s w:+0.7	0 NM	731; 4.40 m	456; 40.94 m	677; 4:40.51 min
25	Rudy Bourguignon; France	6726	763; 11.45 s w:-0.5	767; 6.80 m w:-0.3	778; 14.81 m	705; 1.89 m	765; 51.08 s	797; 15.44 s w:+0.7	570; 35.33 m	910; 5.00 m	671; 55.53 m	0 DNF
26	Hendrik Lepik; Estonia	6659	683; 11.84 s w:-0.5	804; 6.96 m w:-0.1	747; 14.30 m	925; 2.13 m	697; 52.64 s	777; 15.61 s w:+0.7	737; 43.56 m	702; 4.30 m	587; 49.90 m	0 DNF
27	Vitalii Pinkevych; Ukraine	5833	709; 11.71 s w:-0.5	697; 6.50 m w:-0.2	645; 12.63 m	705; 1.89 m	738; 51.69 s	803; 15.39 s w:+0.7	506; 32.09 m	0 NM	372; 35.14 m	658; 4:43.54 min
28	Filip Niegowski; Poland	5358	643; 12.04 s w:-0.5	695; 6.49 m w:-1.1	655; 12.80 m	0 NM	671; 53.26 s	734; 15.99 s w:+0.7	639; 38.76 m	790; 4.60 m	531; 46.12 m	0 DNF
29	Marco Ribolzi; Italy	4985 SB	725; 11.63 s w:-0.5	785; 6.88 m w:+0.9	565; 11.31 m	785; 1.98 m	804; 50.22 s	769; 15.68 s w:+0.7	0 NM	0 NM	0 NM	552; 5:01.34 min
DNF	Roger Skedd; United Kingdom	2782	734; 11.59 s w:-0.1	725; 6.62 m w:+0.1	696; 13.47 m	627; 1.80 m	0 DNF	0 DNS w:+2.0	DNS			
DNF	Oleksiy Kasyanov; Ukraine	0	0 DNF w:-0.1	0 DNS	DNS							
DNF	Anatoli Koshar; Belarus	0	0 DNF w:-0.1	0 DNS	DNS							

==== Women's Heptathlon ====
Key

The highest mark recorded in each event is highlighted in yellow

Rank	Athlete	Overall points	100 m H	HJ	SP	200 m	LJ	JT	800 m
1st place, gold medalist(s)	Karolina Tymińska; Poland	6347	1036; 13.60 s w:0.0	806; 1.66 m	826; 14.48 m	1003; 23.77 s w:+2.2	978; 6.41 m w:+2.6	713; 42.40 m	985; 2:08.60 min
2nd place, silver medalist(s)	Hanna Melnychenko; Ukraine	6260	1065; 13.40 s w:0.0	991; 1.81 m	773; 13.69 m	965; 24.16 s w:+2.2	953; 6.33 m w:+2.2	604; 36.67 m	909; 2:13.86 min
3rd place, bronze medalist(s)	Grit Šadeiko; Estonia	6221 NR	1033; 13.62 s w:-0.4	953; 1.78 m	661; 12.00 m	961; 24.21 s w:+1.7	959; 6.35 m w:+1.2	797; 46.75 m	857; 2:17.58 min
4	Antoinette Nana Djimou Ida; France	6104	1056; 13.46 s w:0.0	842; 1.69 m	786; 13.88 m	908; 24.77 s w:+2.2	798; 5.83 m w:+2.2	869; 50.44 m	845; 2:18.43 min
5	Yana Maksimava; Belarus	6027	941; 14.27 s w:0.0	991; 1.81 m	811; 14.26 m	834; 25.58 s w:+2.2	798; 5.83 m w:+1.2	726; 43.06 m	926; 2:12.67 min
6	Mari Klaup; Estonia	6002 PB	966; 14.09 s w:0.0	991; 1.81 m	715; 12.81 m	831; 25.62 s w:+2.2	798; 5.83 m w:+2.2	859; 49.92 m	842; 2:18.67 min
7	Aleksandra Butvina; Russia	5979	943; 14.25 s w:0.0	916; 1.75 m	806; 14.18 m	903; 24.82 s w:+2.2	828; 5.93 m w:+1.2	681; 40.69 m	902; 2:14.35 min
8	Anastasiya Mokhnyuk; Ukraine	5941 PB	1058; 13.45 s w:+1.0	991; 1.81 m	698; 12.55 m	860; 25.29 s w:+1.1	946; 6.31 m w:+1.6	567; 34.77 m	821; 2:20.22 min
9	Uliana Alexanderova; Russia	5916 PB	931; 14.34 s w:-0.4	1029; 1.84 m	739; 13.18 m	799; 25.98 s w:+1.7	953; 6.33 m w:+3.3	731; 43.32 m	734; 2:26.74 min
10	Katsiaryna Netsviatayeva; Belarus	5884	1001; 13.84 s w:-0.4	879; 1.72 m	807; 14.19 m	892; 24.94 s w:+1.7	683; 5.44 m w:+1.6	687; 41.05 m	935; 2:12.03 min
11	Grace Clements; United Kingdom	5817 SB	895; 14.60 s w:-1.8	842; 1.69 m	802; 14.12 m	795; 26.03 s w:+1.3	828; 5.93 m w:+1.4	765; 45.07 m	890; 2:15.19 min
12	Elena Molodchinina; Russia	5796 PB	991; 13.91 s w:+1.0	879; 1.72 m	633; 11.57 m	868; 25.21 s w:+1.1	915; 6.21 m w:+1.6	614; 37.24 m	896; 2:14.75 min
13	Yana Panteleeva; Russia	5672	914; 14.46 s w:-1.8	953; 1.78 m	696; 12.52 m	814; 25.81 s w:+1.3	828; 5.93 m w:+3.4	648; 38.98 m	819; 2:20.32 min
14	Joanna Rowland; United Kingdom	5643	902; 14.55 s w:-0.4	806; 1.66 m	729; 13.03 m	878; 25.10 s w:+1.7	771; 5.74 m w:+1.2	721; 42.81 m	836; 2:19.11 min
15	Rokhaya Mbaye; France	5627	988; 13.93 s w:+1.0	879; 1.72 m	727; 13.00 m	870; 25.18 s w:+1.1	789; 5.80 m w:+1.5	743; 43.96 m	631; 2:35.03 min
16	Jessica Tappin; United Kingdom	5544	997; 13.87 s w:0.0	806; 1.66 m	632; 11.56 m	914; 24.71 s w:+2.2	774; 5.75 m w:+2.3	552; 33.99 m	869; 2:16.68 min
17	Karla Drew; United Kingdom	5535 PB	1066; 13.39 s w:+1.0	916; 1.75 m	637; 11.64 m	851; 25.39 s w:+1.1	795; 5.82 m w:+3.5	464; 29.31 m	806; 2:21.33 min
18	Carolina Bianchi; Italy	5481 PB	931; 14.34 s w:0.0	806; 1.66 m	604; 11.13 m	862; 25.27 s w:+2.2	795; 5.82 m w:+1.0	690; 41.16 m	793; 2:22.28 min
19	Merryl Mbeng; France	5430	953; 14.18 s w:-1.8	806; 1.66 m	548; 10.28 m	870; 25.18 s w:+1.3	783; 5.78 m w:+1.5	532; 32.92 m	938; 2:11.82 min
20	Elisa Trevisan; Italy	5345 SB	905; 14.53 s w:-0.4	771; 1.63 m	723; 12.93 m	795; 26.02 s w:+1.7	735; 5.62 m w:+1.1	689; 41.11 m	727; 2:27.32 min
21	Olha Pushkina; Ukraine	5344	796; 15.35 s w:-1.8	701; 1.57 m	674; 12.19 m	841; 25.50 s w:+1.3	896; 6.15 m w:+3.6	684; 40.88 m	752; 2:25.40 min
22	Karolina Kędzia; Poland	5309	906; 14.52 s w:-0.4	771; 1.63 m	642; 11.71 m	741; 26.65 s w:+1.7	822; 5.91 m w:0.0	682; 40.79 m	745; 2:25.94 min
23	Marika Marlicka; Poland	5207 PB	918; 14.43 s w:-1.8	771; 1.63 m	585; 10.84 m	809; 25.86 s w:+1.3	807; 5.86 m w:+2.7	592; 36.09 m	725; 2:27.49 min
24	Anna Kulinich; Belarus	5177	906; 14.52 s w:+1.0	842; 1.69 m	577; 10.73 m	821; 25.73 s w:+1.1	712; 5.54 m w:+0.4	537; 33.17 m	782; 2:23.12 min
25	Flavia Nasella; Italy	5170	817; 15.19 s w:-1.8	806; 1.66 m	535; 10.09 m	902; 24.83 s w:+1.3	756; 5.69 m w:+2.3	584; 35.65 m	770; 2:24.00 min
26	Terje Kaunissaar; Estonia	5138 SB	828; 15.10 s w:+1.0	666; 1.54 m	643; 11.72 m	770; 26.31 s w:+1.1	741; 5.64 m w:+1.3	676; 40.46 m	814; 2:20.73 min
27	Karol Rahuoja; Estonia	4989	786; 15.43 s w:-1.8	879; 1.72 m	535; 10.09 m	749; 26.56 s w:+1.3	777; 5.76 m w:+0.4	459; 29.08 m	804; 2:21.48 min
28	Maryna Bachko; Belarus	4832	768; 15.57 s w:-1.8	771; 1.63 m	584; 10.83 m	802; 25.95 s w:+1.3	729; 5.60 m w:+1.0	505; 31.48 m	673; 2:31.61 min
29	Izabela Mikołajczyk; Poland	3642 SB	957; 14.15 s w:+1.0	916; 1.75 m	558; 10.44 m	850; 25.40 s w:+1.1	0 NM	361; 23.86 m	DNF
DNF	Alina Fyodorova; Ukraine	3613	924; 14.39 s w:-0.4	1106; 1.90 m	792; 13.97 m	791; 26.07 s w:+1.7	0 DNS	DNS	
DNF	Marisa De Aniceto; France	2413	967; 14.08 s w:-0.4	916; 1.75 m	671; 12.15 m	826; 25.67 s w:+1.7	0 DNS	DNS	
30	Laura Rendina; Italy	1882 SB	0 DQ w:+1.0	632; 1.51 m	651; 11.84 m	0 DNF w:+1.1	0 NM	599; 36.42 m	0 DNF

=== Participation ===
An unofficial count yields the participation of 64 athletes from 8 countries.

- Belarus (8)
- Estonia (8)
- France (8)
- United Kingdom (8)
- Italy (8)
- Poland (8)
- Russia (8)
- Ukraine (8)

== First league ==
Detailed reports on the event and an appraisal of the results were given.

Complete results were published.

=== Results ===
==== Men's Decathlon ====
Key

The highest mark recorded in each event is highlighted in yellow

Rank	Athlete	Overall points	100 m	LJ	SP	HJ	400 m	110 m H	DT	PV	JT	1500 m
1	Eelco Sintnicolaas; Netherlands	8322	874; 10.94 s w:-0.7	852; 7.16 m w:0.0	700; 13.53 m	785; 1.98 m	901; 48.16 s	985; 13.92 s w:+0.9	729; 43.17 m	1035; 5.40 m	687; 56.62 m	774; 4:25.51 min
	Nicklas Wiberg; Sweden	7678 SB	750; 11.51 s w:-0.7	790; 6.90 m w:-0.4	749; 14.33 m	785; 1.98 m	816; 49.96 s	817; 15.27 s w:+0.9	694; 41.45 m	673; 4.20 m	864; 68.33 m	740; 4:30.63 min
3	Bas Markies; Netherlands	7457 PB	843; 11.08 s w:-0.6	823; 7.04 m w:-0.5	670; 13.05 m	705; 1.89 m	799; 50.34 s	927; 14.37 s w:+0.7	595; 36.56 m	790; 4.60 m	652; 54.28 m	653; 4:44.39 min
4	Jonay Jordán; Spain	7364	795; 11.30 s w:-0.6	783; 6.87 m w:+0.1	754; 14.42 m	785; 1.98 m	791; 50.51 s	901; 14.58 s w:+0.7	626; 38.08 m	702; 4.30 m	703; 57.66 m	524; 5:06.37 min
5	Pavel Baar; Czech Republic	7341	827; 11.15 s w:-0.6	755; 6.75 m w:+0.4	649; 12.70 m	679; 1.86 m	857; 49.09 s	846; 15.03 s w:+0.7	620; 37.80 m	790; 4.60 m	664; 55.04 m	654; 4:44.21 min
6	Dominik Alberto; Switzerland	7318 SB	838; 11.10 s w:-0.7	704; 6.53 m w:-0.4	636; 12.49 m	731; 1.92 m	845; 49.34 s	891; 14.66 s w:+0.9	610; 37.29 m	941; 5.10 m	588; 49.97 m	534; 5:04.60 min
7	Sami Itani; Finland	7291	769; 11.42 s w:-0.7	757; 6.76 m w:+0.8	742; 14.22 m	813; 2.01 m	734; 51.78 s	884; 14.72 s w:+0.9	664; 39.97 m	673; 4.20 m	590; 50.08 m	665; 4:42.41 min
8	Jaroslav Hedvičák; Czech Republic	7286	867; 10.97 s w:-0.7	736; 6.67 m w:+0.1	609; 12.04 m	758; 1.95 m	841; 49.44 s	882; 14.73 s w:+0.9	620; 37.80 m	790; 4.60 m	519; 45.27 m	664; 4:42.63 min
9	Pim Jehee; Netherlands	7279 PB	830; 11.14 s w:-0.9	857; 7.18 m w:+0.2	616; 12.16 m	627; 1.80 m	828; 49.70 s	864; 14.88 s w:+0.8	600; 36.80 m	760; 4.50 m	645; 53.77 m	652; 4:44.56 min
10	Thomas Barrineau; Finland	7260	814; 11.21 s w:-0.6	652; 6.30 m w:-0.5	651; 12.73 m	653; 1.83 m	846; 49.33 s	792; 15.48 s w:+0.7	651; 39.35 m	910; 5.00 m	655; 54.46 m	636; 4:47.13 min
11	Simon Walter; Switzerland	7240 SB	763; 11.45 s w:-0.6	776; 6.84 m w:-0.4	651; 12.74 m	731; 1.92 m	783; 50.69 s	820; 15.25 s w:+0.7	707; 42.10 m	849; 4.80 m	665; 55.16 m	495; 5:11.63 min
12	Mauri Kaattari; Finland	7225	657; 11.97 s w:-2.1	799; 6.94 m w:+0.4	722; 13.89 m	785; 1.98 m	612; 54.68 s	801; 15.41 s w:+0.2	724; 42.90 m	790; 4.60 m	808; 64.62 m	527; 5:05.78 min
13	Jorge Ureña; Spain	7209	791; 11.32 s w:-0.9	830; 7.07 m w:+0.8	606; 12.00 m	785; 1.98 m	798; 50.37 s	911; 14.50 s w:+0.8	347; 23.96 m	731; 4.40 m	667; 55.29 m	743; 4:30.20 min
14	Flavien Antille; Switzerland	7174 SB	730; 11.61 s w:-2.1	802; 6.95 m w:-0.5	628; 12.35 m	840; 2.04 m	739; 51.67 s	798; 15.43 s w:+0.2	616; 37.58 m	790; 4.60 m	635; 53.14 m	596; 4:53.77 min
15	Rasmus Carlsson; Sweden	7135	776; 11.39 s w:-0.9	723; 6.61 m w:0.0	684; 13.27 m	758; 1.95 m	779; 50.79 s	728; 16.04 s w:+0.8	590; 36.33 m	972; 5.20 m	577; 49.22 m	548; 5:02.06 min
16	Björn Barrefors; Sweden	7040	771; 11.41 s w:-0.6	816; 7.01 m w:+0.1	688; 13.34 m	653; 1.83 m	717; 52.18 s	833; 15.14 s w:+0.7	727; 43.06 m	790; 4.60 m	559; 48.03 m	486; 5:13.15 min
17	Adam Hromčík; Czech Republic	6921	817; 11.20 s w:-0.9	723; 6.61 m w:-0.2	590; 11.73 m	627; 1.80 m	820; 49.88 s	864; 14.88 s w:+0.8	542; 33.92 m	731; 4.40 m	560; 48.07 m	647; 4:45.29 min
18	Perttu Noponen; Finland	6889	765; 11.44 s w:-0.9	778; 6.85 m w:-0.3	696; 13.47 m	679; 1.86 m	636; 54.09 s	795; 15.46 s w:+0.8	696; 41.55 m	673; 4.20 m	641; 53.50 m	530; 5:05.23 min
19	Ferry van Dipten; Netherlands	6868 PB	774; 11.40 s w:-2.1	788; 6.89 m w:+0.7	583; 11.61 m	653; 1.83 m	789; 50.56 s	860; 14.91 s w:+0.2	501; 31.87 m	673; 4.20 m	502; 44.13 m	745; 4:30.00 min
20	Michael Bucher; Switzerland	6760	769; 11.42 s w:-0.9	755; 6.75 m w:+0.3	609; 12.05 m	731; 1.92 m	744; 51.57 s	765; 15.72 s w:+0.8	556; 34.61 m	731; 4.40 m	414; 38.04 m	686; 4:39.06 min
21	Igor Legarda; Spain	6699 PB	776; 11.39 s w:-2.1	811; 6.99 m w:+0.2	514; 10.47 m	785; 1.98 m	792; 50.49 s	884; 14.72 s w:+0.2	547; 34.18 m	702; 4.30 m	337; 32.69 m	551; 5:01.54 min
22	Levente Käfer; Hungary	6453 SB	742; 11.55 s w:-0.6	688; 6.46 m w:+0.2	643; 12.60 m	705; 1.89 m	664; 53.42 s	882; 14.73 s w:+0.7	579; 35.77 m	673; 4.20 m	403; 37.27 m	474; 5:15.43 min
23	Adam Schneiker; Hungary	6012 PB	693; 11.79 s w:-2.1	604; 6.08 m w:-0.1	612; 12.09 m	653; 1.83 m	682; 52.98 s	757; 15.79 s w:+0.2	543; 33.95 m	562; 3.80 m	423; 38.66 m	483; 5:13.72 min
24	Lasse Ohtamaa; Sweden	5984 SB	717; 11.67 s w:-2.1	684; 6.44 m w:+0.5	684; 13.27 m	653; 1.83 m	748; 51.48 s	696; 16.33 s w:+0.2	712; 42.32 m	509; 3.60 m	581; 49.47 m	0 DNF
25	Norbert Kovács; Hungary	5269	691; 11.80 s w:-0.9	716; 6.58 m w:-0.1	608; 12.02 m	602; 1.77 m	675; 53.16 s	0 DNF w:+0.8	518; 32.70 m	617; 4.00 m	574; 49.03 m	268; 5:59.13 min
DNF	Václav Sedlák; Czech Republic	3676	791; 11.32 s w:-2.1	707; 6.54 m w:+0.1	626; 12.32 m	731; 1.92 m	821; 49.87 s	0 DNF w:+0.2	0 DNS	DNS		
DNF	David Gómez; Spain	3495	738; 11.57 s w:-0.7	702; 6.52 m w:-0.5	656; 12.81 m	705; 1.89 m	694; 52.70 s	0 DNS w:+0.9	DNS			
DNF	Attila Szabó; Hungary	1505	780; 11.37 s w:-0.7	725; 6.62 m w:+0.3	0 DNS	DNS						

==== Women's Heptathlon ====
Key

The highest mark recorded in each event is highlighted in yellow

Rank	Athlete	Overall points	100 m H	HJ	SP	200 m	LJ	JT	800 m
1	Nadine Broersen; Netherlands	6238	1049; 13.51 s w:+0.2	991; 1.81 m	817; 14.34 m	839; 25.53 s w:-2.2	912; 6.20 m w:+1.3	756; 44.60 m	874; 2:16.33 min
2	Eliška Klučinová; Czech Republic	6013	956; 14.16 s w:+0.2	991; 1.81 m	759; 13.48 m	866; 25.23 s w:-2.2	822; 5.91 m w:+0.5	777; 45.72 m	842; 2:18.66 min
3	Ellen Sprunger; Switzerland	5987	993; 13.90 s w:+0.2	806; 1.66 m	710; 12.74 m	990; 23.90 s w:-2.2	874; 6.08 m w:+1.5	723; 42.91 m	891; 2:15.09 min
4	Kateřina Cachová; Czech Republic	5899 SB	1017; 13.73 s w:-0.1	953; 1.78 m	587; 10.88 m	893; 24.93 s w:-1.4	822; 5.91 m w:+0.4	719; 42.67 m	908; 2:13.95 min
5	Nadja Casadei; Sweden	5834 SB	957; 14.15 s w:-0.1	806; 1.66 m	767; 13.59 m	860; 25.29 s w:-1.4	862; 6.04 m w:+0.8	653; 39.24 m	929; 2:12.44 min
6	Myrte Goor; Netherlands	5772 PB	946; 14.23 s w:-0.1	879; 1.72 m	735; 13.11 m	881; 25.06 s w:-1.4	786; 5.79 m w:+0.4	628; 37.94 m	917; 2:13.29 min
7	Valérie Reggel; Switzerland	5689 SB	954; 14.17 s w:-0.2	806; 1.66 m	712; 12.77 m	860; 25.29 s w:-1.5	810; 5.87 m w:0.0	629; 38.02 m	918; 2:13.22 min
8	Amanda Spiljard; Netherlands	5681 PB	890; 14.64 s w:-0.2	842; 1.69 m	747; 13.29 m	810; 25.85 s w:-1.5	846; 5.99 m w:+0.7	753; 44.45 m	793; 2:22.25 min
9	Sofia Linde; Sweden	5564	973; 14.04 s w:+0.2	916; 1.75 m	749; 13.33 m	809; 25.86 s w:-2.2	837; 5.96 m w:+0.4	586; 35.73 m	694; 2:29.88 min
10	Miia Kurppa; Finland	5524 SB	856; 14.89 s w:+0.2	916; 1.75 m	676; 12.22 m	664; 27.59 s w:-2.2	798; 5.83 m w:+0.8	865; 50.25 m	749; 2:25.60 min
11	Michelle Zeltner; Switzerland	5359	890; 14.64 s w:-0.6	879; 1.72 m	704; 12.64 m	760; 26.43 s w:-1.3	753; 5.68 m w:+0.6	568; 34.79 m	805; 2:21.37 min
12	Laura Ginés; Spain	5242	912; 14.48 s w:+0.2	806; 1.66 m	761; 13.51 m	774; 26.27 s w:-2.2	617; 5.21 m w:+0.8	616; 37.32 m	756; 2:25.10 min
13	Olatz Arrieta; Spain	5239 PB	959; 14.14 s w:-0.2	806; 1.66 m	526; 9.94 m	817; 25.78 s w:-1.5	908; 6.19 m w:+0.2	448; 28.50 m	775; 2:23.61 min
14	Jutta Heinonen; Finland	5133	846; 14.97 s w:-0.1	736; 1.60 m	647; 11.78 m	698; 27.17 s w:-1.4	807; 5.86 m w:+1.3	597; 36.32 m	802; 2:21.62 min
15	Yanira Soto; Spain	5132	905; 14.53 s w:-0.6	701; 1.57 m	577; 10.73 m	826; 25.67 s w:-1.3	738; 5.63 m w:+0.3	577; 35.30 m	808; 2:21.13 min
16	Therese Jernbeck; Sweden	5023	758; 15.65 s w:-0.2	736; 1.60 m	702; 12.62 m	696; 27.19 s w:-1.5	628; 5.25 m w:+0.9	590; 35.97 m	913; 2:13.60 min
17	Elin Tornhed; Sweden	5017	804; 15.29 s w:-0.6	879; 1.72 m	489; 9.38 m	798; 25.99 s w:-1.3	671; 5.40 m w:+1.5	467; 29.49 m	909; 2:13.83 min
18	Zsanett Krucsai; Hungary	4950	875; 14.75 s w:+0.2	879; 1.72 m	506; 9.64 m	751; 26.54 s w:-2.2	795; 5.82 m w:+0.9	554; 34.05 m	590; 2:38.48 min
19	Heini Raunio; Finland	4929	872; 14.77 s w:-0.6	806; 1.66 m	478; 9.21 m	780; 26.20 s w:-1.3	792; 5.81 m w:0.0	467; 29.50 m	734; 2:26.80 min
20	Réka Czúth; Hungary	4929	866; 14.82 s w:-0.1	879; 1.72 m	475; 9.17 m	795; 26.03 s w:-1.4	747; 5.66 m w:+0.7	534; 33.01 m	633; 2:34.85 min
21	Nicole Berghouwer; Netherlands	4845 SB	806; 15.27 s w:-0.6	666; 1.54 m	616; 11.32 m	742; 26.64 s w:-1.3	637; 5.28 m w:+1.1	644; 38.76 m	734; 2:26.80 min
22	Alexandra Muziková; Czech Republic	4831	819; 15.17 s w:-0.6	736; 1.60 m	593; 10.97 m	702; 27.12 s w:-1.3	654; 5.34 m w:+0.8	540; 33.35 m	787; 2:22.68 min
23	Aneta Komrsková; Czech Republic	4801	901; 14.56 s w:-0.2	736; 1.60 m	595; 11.00 m	729; 26.79 s w:-1.5	691; 5.47 m w:+0.8	547; 33.73 m	602; 2:37.46 min
24	Nóra Huszka; Hungary	4670 PB	782; 15.46 s w:-0.6	666; 1.54 m	636; 11.62 m	775; 26.25 s w:-1.3	551; 4.97 m w:0.0	653; 39.28 m	607; 2:37.10 min
25	Nora Bruckner; Hungary	4336 PB	723; 15.93 s w:-0.2	632; 1.51 m	499; 9.53 m	731; 26.77 s w:-1.5	524; 4.87 m w:0.0	466; 29.45 m	761; 2:24.68 min
DNF	Caridad Jerez; Spain	2402	1037; 13.59 s w:-0.1	771; 1.63 m	594; 10.98 m	0 DNF w:-1.4	0 DNS	DNS	
DNF	Hertta Heikkinen; Finland	2105	862; 14.85 s w:-0.2	701; 1.57 m	542; 10.19 m	0 DNS w:-1.5	DNS		
DNF	Linda Züblin; Switzerland		0 DQ w:-0.1	0 DNS	DNS				

==== Overall Team ====
Teams promoted to the super league are highlighted in light green
Teams relegated to the second league are highlighted in light red

Place	Country	Points
1	Netherlands	40749 pts
2	Switzerland	38767 pts
3	Czech Republic	38291 pts
4	Sweden	38274 pts
5	Finland	37362 pts
6	Spain	36885 pts
7	Hungary	32283 pts
—	Greece	DNS

==== Participation ====
An unofficial count yields the participation of 56 athletes from 7 countries.

- Czech Republic (8)
- Spain (8)
- Finland (8)
- Hungary (8)
- Netherlands (8)
- Switzerland (8)
- Sweden (8)

== Second league ==
Detailed reports on the event and an appraisal of the results were given.

Complete results were published.

=== Results ===
==== Men's Decathlon ====
Key

The highest mark recorded in each event is highlighted in yellow

Rank	Athlete	Overall points	100 m	LJ	SP	HJ	400 m	110 m H	DT	PV	JT	1500 m
1	Lars Vikan Rise; Norway	7621 SB	730; 11.61 s w:-0.8	788; 6.89 m w:+0.3	832; 15.68 m	785; 1.98 m	803; 50.26 s	729; 16.03 s w:+0.8	734; 43.38 m	673; 4.20 m	843; 66.93 m	704; 4:36.33 min
2	Tiago Marto; Portugal	7603 SB	819; 11.19 s w:-0.8	850; 7.15 m w:+0.5	725; 13.95 m	758; 1.95 m	775; 50.86 s	895; 14.63 s w:+0.8	693; 41.38 m	790; 4.60 m	610; 51.42 m	688; 4:38.84 min
3	Martin Roe; Norway	7476	825; 11.16 s w:-0.8	788; 6.89 m w:+0.9	738; 14.15 m	731; 1.92 m	825; 49.78 s	727; 16.05 s w:+0.8	756; 44.46 m	645; 4.10 m	765; 61.82 m	676; 4:40.76 min
4	Hans Olav Uldal; Norway	7369 SB	753; 11.50 s w:-0.7	850; 7.15 m w:+0.6	753; 14.41 m	679; 1.86 m	720; 52.10 s	842; 15.06 s w:+0.2	742; 43.80 m	760; 4.50 m	707; 57.93 m	563; 4:59.39 min
5	Samuel Remédios; Portugal	7146 PB	872; 10.95 s w:+0.2	781; 6.86 m w:-0.4	554; 11.13 m	731; 1.92 m	815; 50.00 s	918; 14.44 s w:+0.2	586; 36.13 m	819; 4.70 m	485; 42.98 m	585; 4:55.59 min
6	Ingi Rúnar Kristinsson; Iceland	6955 PB	786; 11.34 s w:+0.2	668; 6.37 m w:+0.4	708; 13.67 m	602; 1.77 m	737; 51.71 s	699; 16.30 s w:+0.3	709; 42.17 m	790; 4.60 m	547; 47.15 m	709; 4:35.43 min
7	Jostein Kvikstad; Norway	6890 PB	782; 11.36 s w:+0.2	748; 6.72 m w:+0.1	580; 11.56 m	627; 1.80 m	820; 49.89 s	823; 15.22 s w:+0.3	622; 37.89 m	590; 3.90 m	659; 54.74 m	639; 4:46.73 min
8	Ionel Irinel Cojan; Romania	6647 PB	778; 11.38 s w:-0.7	790; 6.90 m w:+0.1	674; 13.11 m	627; 1.80 m	840; 49.45 s	734; 15.99 s w:+0.2	591; 36.35 m	535; 3.70 m	518; 45.19 m	560; 5:00.03 min
9	Carlos Santos; Portugal	6421 PB	699; 11.76 s w:-0.7	804; 6.96 m w:+0.5	537; 10.85 m	679; 1.86 m	688; 52.85 s	808; 15.35 s w:+0.3	564; 35.01 m	457; 3.40 m	509; 44.59 m	676; 4:40.74 min
10	Yusuf Pehlevan; Turkey	6316 PB	827; 11.15 s w:-0.7	741; 6.69 m w:+1.1	521; 10.59 m	758; 1.95 m	763; 51.13 s	823; 15.22 s w:+0.2	582; 35.89 m	431; 3.30 m	446; 40.30 m	424; 5:24.98 min
11	Hikmet Tugsus; Turkey	6303 SB	711; 11.70 s w:-0.7	648; 6.28 m w:+0.8	591; 11.75 m	552; 1.71 m	771; 50.95 s	809; 15.34 s w:+0.2	595; 36.58 m	406; 3.20 m	581; 49.52 m	639; 4:46.59 min
12	Ionuţ Feniuc; Romania	6297 SB	725; 11.63 s w:+0.2	650; 6.29 m w:+0.3	528; 10.70 m	758; 1.95 m	744; 51.57 s	669; 16.58 s w:+0.3	513; 32.48 m	673; 4.20 m	436; 39.60 m	601; 4:52.95 min
13	Razvan George Roman; Romania	6110 PB	776; 11.39 s w:-0.8	732; 6.65 m w:+1.3	610; 12.06 m	679; 1.86 m	798; 50.37 s	706; 16.24 s w:+0.8	485; 31.05 m	357; 3.00 m	502; 44.08 m	465; 5:17.20 min
14	Yunus Pehlevan; Turkey	5930 PB	732; 11.60 s w:-0.8	776; 6.84 m w:+1.8	540; 10.91 m	653; 1.83 m	679; 53.05 s	492; 18.34 s w:+0.8	425; 28.01 m	819; 4.70 m	484; 42.86 m	330; 5:44.76 min
15	Krister Blær Jónsson; Iceland	5826 PB	673; 11.89 s w:-0.7	595; 6.04 m w:+1.2	455; 9.49 m	653; 1.83 m	738; 51.70 s	628; 16.96 s w:+0.2	450; 29.29 m	406; 3.20 m	578; 49.26 m	650; 4:44.82 min
16	Ramazan Can; Turkey	5640 PB	711; 11.70 s w:+0.2	753; 6.74 m w:+1.7	417; 8.85 m	602; 1.77 m	642; 53.94 s	684; 16.44 s w:+0.3	344; 23.79 m	509; 3.60 m	387; 36.19 m	591; 4:54.72 min
DNF	Hermann Thór Haraldsson; Iceland	701	701; 11.75 s w:-0.8	0 NM	0 DNS							

==== Women's Heptathlon ====
Key

The highest mark recorded in each event is highlighted in yellow

Rank	Athlete	Overall points	100 m H	HJ	SP	200 m	LJ	JT	800 m
1	Lucija Cvitanović; Croatia	5547 NR	856; 14.89 s w:+2.1	916; 1.75 m	654; 11.89 m	687; 27.30 s w:-2.7	709; 5.53 m w:+0.5	873; 50.67 m	852; 2:17.89 min
2	Tine Bach Ejlersen; Denmark	5528 PB	987; 13.94 s w:+2.1	842; 1.69 m	604; 11.14 m	818; 25.76 s w:-2.7	853; 6.01 m w:0.0	567; 34.78 m	857; 2:17.54 min
3	Sveinbjörg Zophoníasdóttir; Iceland	5479 PB	844; 14.98 s w:+1.9	953; 1.78 m	686; 12.38 m	788; 26.10 s w:-3.2	822; 5.91 m w:+1.3	610; 37.02 m	776; 2:23.53 min
4	Judit Nagy; Romania	5464 SB	952; 14.19 s w:+1.9	806; 1.66 m	668; 12.11 m	826; 25.67 s w:-3.2	750; 5.67 m w:+0.7	690; 41.16 m	772; 2:23.87 min
5	Beatrice Puiu; Romania	5446 =SB	1056; 13.46 s w:+1.2	991; 1.81 m	794; 14.00 m	820; 25.74 s w:-2.8	371; 4.27 m w:+0.1	631; 38.11 m	783; 2:23.05 min
6	Kelly Proper; Ireland	5429	905; 14.53 s w:+2.1	736; 1.60 m	567; 10.57 m	969; 24.12 s w:-2.7	905; 6.18 m w:-0.8	539; 33.31 m	808; 2:21.12 min
7	María Rún Gunnlaugsdóttir; Iceland	5321 PB	898; 14.58 s w:+1.2	842; 1.69 m	576; 10.71 m	794; 26.04 s w:-2.8	777; 5.76 m w:+0.3	644; 38.76 m	790; 2:22.50 min
8	Lene Secher Myrmel; Norway	5314 SB	1005; 13.81 s w:+1.2	771; 1.63 m	562; 10.49 m	777; 26.23 s w:-2.8	783; 5.78 m w:+0.2	596; 36.30 m	820; 2:20.27 min
9	Frida Thorsås; Norway	5233	917; 14.44 s w:+1.2	806; 1.66 m	648; 11.80 m	727; 26.82 s w:-2.8	640; 5.29 m w:+0.2	607; 36.87 m	888; 2:15.31 min
10	Rafaela Vitorino; Portugal	5118	886; 14.67 s w:+1.2	879; 1.72 m	582; 10.80 m	793; 26.05 s w:-2.8	726; 5.59 m w:+0.3	374; 24.56 m	878; 2:16.07 min
11	Cláudia Rodrigues; Portugal	5006	851; 14.93 s w:+1.9	842; 1.69 m	541; 10.18 m	737; 26.70 s w:-3.2	706; 5.52 m w:+0.6	531; 32.87 m	798; 2:21.87 min
12	Ana Margarida Oliveira; Portugal	4956 PB	818; 15.18 s w:+1.9	916; 1.75 m	528; 9.98 m	767; 26.35 s w:-3.2	798; 5.83 m w:+0.5	370; 24.36 m	759; 2:24.87 min
13	Fjóla Signý Hannesdóttir; Iceland	4933 SB	886; 14.67 s w:+1.9	842; 1.69 m	521; 9.87 m	789; 26.09 s w:-3.2	665; 5.38 m w:0.0	401; 25.98 m	829; 2:19.56 min
14	Elena Panturoiu; Romania	4931	888; 14.65 s w:+1.2	771; 1.63 m	552; 10.35 m	755; 26.49 s w:-2.8	688; 5.46 m w:+0.7	460; 29.10 m	817; 2:20.48 min
15	Martine Bye; Norway	4915 PB	802; 15.30 s w:+1.9	916; 1.75 m	575; 10.69 m	629; 28.02 s w:-3.2	614; 5.20 m w:+1.0	614; 37.21 m	765; 2:24.40 min
16	Ilona Dramaconoka; Latvia	4711 PB	805; 15.28 s w:+2.1	842; 1.69 m	516; 9.79 m	708; 27.05 s w:-2.7	663; 5.37 m w:-0.2	525; 32.56 m	652; 2:33.29 min
17	Roisin Howard; Ireland	3973 SB	664; 16.42 s w:+2.1	632; 1.51 m	506; 9.64 m	645; 27.82 s w:-2.7	584; 5.09 m w:+0.1	332; 22.34 m	610; 2:36.81 min
DNF	Arna Stefanía Gudmundsdóttir; Iceland	3747	920; 14.42 s w:+1.2	842; 1.69 m	539; 10.15 m	864; 25.25 s w:-2.8	0 NM	582; 35.52 m	0 DNS

==== Team ====
Teams promoted to the first league are highlighted in light green

Place	Country	Points
1	Norway	37928 pts
2	Portugal	36250 pts
3	Romania	34895 pts
—	Iceland	DNF

=== Participation ===
An unofficial count yields the participation of 35 athletes from 9 countries.

- Croatia (1)
- Denmark (1)
- Ireland (2)
- Iceland (7)
- Latvia (1)
- Norway (7)
- Portugal (6)
- Romania (6)
- Turkey (4)
