= 2016 European Athletics Championships – Women's heptathlon =

Women's heptathlon at the 2016 European Athletics Championships
- Venue: Olympic Stadium
- Location: Amsterdam
- Dates: 8 and 9 July 2016
- Competitors: 21 from 16 nations
- Winning points: 6626

Medalists
gold medal	Anouk Vetter	Netherlands
silver medal	Antoinette Nana Djimou	France
bronze medal	Ivona Dadic	Austria

The women's heptathlon at the 2016 European Athletics Championships took place at the Olympic Stadium on 8 and 9 July.

== Records ==
Standing records prior to the 2016 European Athletics Championships
World record	Jackie Joyner-Kersee (USA)	7291 pts	Seoul, South Korea	24 September 1988
European record	Carolina Klüft (SWE)	7032 pts	Osaka, Japan	26 August 2007
Championship record	Jessica Ennis (GBR)	6823 pts	Barcelona, Spain	31 July 2010
World Leading	Brianne Theisen-Eaton (CAN)	6765 pts	Götzis, Austria	29 May 2016
European Leading	Laura Ikauniece-Admidiņa (LAT)	6622 pts	Götzis, Austria	29 May 2016

== Schedule ==
Date	Time	Round
8 July 2016	12:15	100 metres hurdles
8 July 2016	13:00	High jump
8 July 2016	18:05	Shot put
8 July 2016	20:00	200 metres
9 July 2016	13:00	Long jump
9 July 2016	14:20	Javelin throw
9 July 2016	20:45	800 metres

All times are local times (UTC+2)

== Results ==
=== 100 metres hurdles ===
Wind:
Heat 1: -0.9 m/s, Heat: +1.2 m/s, Heat 3: -0.7 m/s

Rank	Heat	Name	Nationality	Time	Notes	Points
1	3	Antoinette Nana Djimou	France	13.26	SB	1086
2	3	Anouk Vetter	Netherlands	13.29	PB	1081
3	3	Katerina Cachová	Czech Republic	13.33		1075
4	2	Xénia Krizsán	Hungary	13.53		1046
5	2	Anna Maiwald	Germany	13.54		1044
6	3	Grit Šadeiko	Estonia	13.58	SB	1039
7	3	Hanna Kasyanova	Ukraine	13.59		1037
8	3	Linda Züblin	Switzerland	13.62	=SB	1033
9	2	Nadine Broersen	Netherlands	13.70		1021
10	2	Sofia Ifantidou	Greece	13.79		1008
11	2	Ivona Dadic	Austria	13.83		1003
12	1	Györgyi Zsivoczky-Farkas	Hungary	13.89	SB	994
13	1	Michelle Zeltner	Switzerland	13.93	PB	988
14	1	Verena Preiner	Austria	13.94	PB	987
15	1	Mari Klaup	Estonia	14.02		976
15	2	Valérie Reggel	Switzerland	14.02	SB	976
17	2	Katsiaryna Netsviatayeva	Belarus	14.20		950
18	1	Austra Skujytė	Lithuania	14.25	SB	943
19	1	Yana Maksimava	Belarus	14.47		913
20	1	Morgan Lake	Great Britain	14.72		879
	3	Karolina Tymińska	Poland	DNF		0

=== High jump ===
Rank	Group	Name	Nationality	1.50	1.53	1.56	1.59	1.62	1.65	1.68	1.71	1.74	1.77	1.80	1.83	1.86	1.89	1.92	Mark	Notes	Points	Total
1	B	Morgan Lake	Great Britain	–	–	–	–	–	–	–	–	–	–	o	xo	o	xo	xxx	1.89		1093	1972
2	B	Györgyi Zsivoczky-Farkas	Hungary	–	–	–	–	–	o	o	o	o	xo	o	xxx				1.80		978	1972
3	B	Austra Skujytė	Lithuania	–	–	–	–	–	o	–	xo	o	o	xxo	xxx				1.80	=SB	978	1921
4	A	Michelle Zeltner	Switzerland	–	–	–	–	–	o	o	o	o	xxo	xxx					1.77	SB	941	1929
5	B	Yana Maksimava	Belarus	–	–	–	–	–	–	–	xo	o	xxo	xxx					1.77		941	1854
5	B	Hanna Kasyanova	Ukraine	–	–	–	–	–	o	o	o	xo	xxo	xxx					1.77	SB	941	1978
7	A	Ivona Dadic	Austria	–	–	–	–	–	xo	xo	o	o	xxo	xxx					1.77	SB	941	1944
8	B	Xénia Krizsán	Hungary	–	–	–	–	–	xo	o	o	o	xxx						1.74		903	1949
9	B	Nadine Broersen	Netherlands	–	–	–	–	–	–	–	xo	xxo	xxx						1.74		903	1924
10	B	Mari Klaup	Estonia	–	–	–	–	–	o	xo	xo	xxo	xxx						1.74		903	1879
11	B	Anouk Vetter	Netherlands	–	–	–	–	o	o	xxo	xo	xxo	xxx						1.74		903	1984
12	B	Antoinette Nana Djimou	France	–	–	–	–	o	o	o	o	xxx							1.71		867	1953
13	A	Verena Preiner	Austria	–	–	o	o	o	o	xxo	o	xxx							1.71	PB	867	1854
14	A	Katsiaryna Netsviatayeva	Belarus	–	–	–	o	o	o	o	xo	xxx							1.71		867	1817
15	A	Anna Maiwald	Germany	–	–	o	o	xo	o	xxo	xxx								1.68	=SB	830	1874
16	A	Grit Šadeiko	Estonia	–	–	–	–	o	xo	xxx									1.65		795	1834
17	A	Sofia Ifantidou	Greece	–	o	o	o	xxo	xxo	xxx									1.65	SB	795	1803
18	B	Katerina Cachová	Czech Republic	–	–	–	–	o	xxx										1.62		759	1834
19	A	Valérie Reggel	Switzerland	–	o	o	xxo	xo	xxx										1.62		759	1735
20	A	Linda Züblin	Switzerland	o	xo	o	xxo	xxo	xxx										1.62	SB	759	1792
	A	Karolina Tymińska	Poland																DNS		0	DNF

=== Shot put ===
Rank	Group	Name	Nationality	#1	#2	#3	Result	Notes	Points	Total
1	B	Austra Skujytė	Lithuania	16.03	16.31	15.91	16.31	SB	949	2870
2	B	Antoinette Nana Djimou	France	15.01	14.55	16.17	16.17	PB	939	2892
3	B	Anouk Vetter	Netherlands	14.51	15.69	–	15.69	PB	907	2891
4	B	Katsiaryna Netsviatayeva	Belarus	14.82	x	14.46	14.82		849	2666
5	A	Michelle Zeltner	Switzerland	14.38	13.69	14.49	14.49	PB	827	2756
6	A	Hanna Kasyanova	Ukraine	13.63	14.12	x	14.12	PB	802	2780
7	A	Ivona Dadic	Austria	10.50	13.15	14.10	14.10	PB	801	2745
8	B	Györgyi Zsivoczky-Farkas	Hungary	12.30	13.96	14.02	14.02	SB	795	2767
9	B	Nadine Broersen	Netherlands	14.01	x	14.45	14.45		824	2748
10	B	Xénia Krizsán	Hungary	13.93	13.91	13.77	13.91	SB	789	2738
11	B	Anna Maiwald	Germany	13.12	13.73	13.51	13.73		776	2650
12	B	Yana Maksimava	Belarus	13.63	x	13.49	13.63		769	2623
13	A	Verena Preiner	Austria	13.09	13.51	x	13.51		761	2615
14	A	Valérie Reggel	Switzerland	12.36	13.27	12.33	13.27	SB	745	2480
15	B	Morgan Lake	Great Britain	x	13.24	13.11	13.24	SB	743	2715
16	A	Sofia Ifantidou	Greece	13.23	12.86	x	13.23	SB	743	2546
17	A	Grit Šadeiko	Estonia	12.77	12.65	12.56	12.77	PB	712	2546
18	A	Linda Züblin	Switzerland	12.55	12.71	x	12.71		708	2500
19	A	Katerina Cachová	Czech Republic	x	11.84	11.82	11.84		651	2485
20	A	Mari Klaup	Estonia	11.70	11.38	11.79	11.79		647	2526

=== 200 metres ===
Wind:
Heat 1: +0.2 m/s, Heat: -0.7 m/s, Heat 3: ? m/s

Rank	Heat	Name	Nationality	Time	Notes	Points	Total
1	3	Anouk Vetter	Netherlands	23.89		991	3882
2	3	Ivona Dadic	Austria	24.11	SB	970	3715
3	3	Katerina Cachová	Czech Republic	24.30		952	3437
4	3	Anna Maiwald	Germany	24.38		945	3595
5	2	Grit Šadeiko	Estonia	24.57		927	3473
6	3	Hanna Kasyanova	Ukraine	24.63	SB	921	3701
7	3	Verena Preiner	Austria	24.64		920	3535
8	2	Michelle Zeltner	Switzerland	24.80		905	3661
9	2	Antoinette Nana Djimou	France	24.92		894	3786
10	2	Valérie Reggel	Switzerland	25.02		885	3365
11	2	Xénia Krizsán	Hungary	25.05	SB	882	3620
12	1	Linda Züblin	Switzerland	25.50		841	3341
13	2	Nadine Broersen	Netherlands	25.51		841	3589
14	2	Katsiaryna Netsviatayeva	Belarus	25.61		832	3498
15	1	Györgyi Zsivoczky-Farkas	Hungary	25.73		821	3588
16	1	Sofia Ifantidou	Greece	26.08		790	3336
17	1	Mari Klaup	Estonia	26.18		781	3307
18	1	Austra Skujytė	Lithuania	26.69		738	3608
19	1	Yana Maksimava	Belarus	26.73		734	3357
	1	Morgan Lake	Great Britain	DNS		0	DNF

=== Long jump ===
Rank	Group	Name	Nationality	#1	#2	#3	Result	Notes	Points	Total
1	B	Nadine Broersen	Netherlands	x	6.40	r	6.40		975	4564
2	B	Anouk Vetter	Netherlands	x	6.02	6.38	6.38		969	4851
3	B	Ivona Dadic	Austria	6.11	6.32	r	6.32		949	4664
4	B	Antoinette Nana Djimou	France	6.13	6.29	6.31	6.31	SB	946	4732
5	B	Katerina Cachová	Czech Republic	6.17	6.17	6.31	6.31	SB	946	4383
6	A	Xénia Krizsán	Hungary	6.13	x	6.00	6.13		890	4510
7	A	Michelle Zeltner	Switzerland	6.10	5.94	6.08	6.10	PB	880	4541
8	B	Györgyi Zsivoczky-Farkas	Hungary	6.06	6.04	x	6.06	SB	868	4456
9	A	Sofia Ifantidou	Greece	6.04	x	6.01	6.04	SB	862	4198
10	B	Austra Skujytė	Lithuania	x	5.88	6.03	6.03	SB	859	4467
11	B	Linda Züblin	Switzerland	5.94	5.75	5.81	5.94		831	4172
12	A	Anna Maiwald	Germany	5.81	x	5.93	5.93	SB	828	4423
13	A	Katsiaryna Netsviatayeva	Belarus	x	5.91	x	5.91		822	4320
14	A	Verena Preiner	Austria	5.64	5.65	5.68	5.68		753	4288
15	A	Yana Maksimava	Belarus	5.65	5.66	5.50	5.66		747	4104
16	B	Hanna Kasyanova	Ukraine	x	5.63	r	5.63		738	4439
17	A	Valérie Reggel	Switzerland	5.12	5.47	5.44	5.47		691	4056
18	A	Mari Klaup	Estonia	x	x	4.16	4.16		345	3652
	B	Grit Šadeiko	Estonia	x	x	x	NM		0	3473

=== Javelin throw ===
Rank	Group	Name	Nationality	#1	#2	#3	Result	Notes	Points	Total
1	B	Sofia Ifantidou	Greece	55.62	55.28	56.36	56.36	CB	984	5182
2	B	Anouk Vetter	Netherlands	49.51	x	55.76	55.76	PB	972	5823
3	B	Nadine Broersen	Netherlands	52.31	x	x	52.31	SB	905	5469
4	B	Antoinette Nana Djimou	France	51.72	47.94	x	51.72	SB	893	5625
5	B	Mari Klaup	Estonia	46.33	50.46	48.79	50.46		869	4521
6	A	Verena Preiner	Austria	36.20	48.31	43.50	48.31	PB	827	5115
7	B	Ivona Dadic	Austria	47.92	47.40	46.29	47.92		820	5484
8	A	Xénia Krizsán	Hungary	47.38	43.21	45.66	47.38		809	5319
9	A	Katsiaryna Netsviatayeva	Belarus	x	x	46.36	46.36	PB	790	5110
10	B	Linda Züblin	Switzerland	44.76	x	46.28	46.28		788	4960
11	A	Györgyi Zsivoczky-Farkas	Hungary	41.24	44.84	46.03	46.03		783	5239
12	B	Austra Skujytė	Lithuania	45.75	x	x	45.75		778	5245
13	A	Katerina Cachová	Czech Republic	39.40	43.98	44.80	44.80		760	5143
14	A	Yana Maksimava	Belarus	43.04	44.35	43.03	44.35		751	4855
15	A	Valérie Reggel	Switzerland	41.71	42.35	40.11	42.35		712	4768
16	A	Anna Maiwald	Germany	41.87	41.85	x	41.87		703	5126
17	A	Michelle Zeltner	Switzerland	35.54	30.00	33.19	35.54		582	5123
	B	Hanna Kasyanova	Ukraine				DNS		0	DNF
	B	Grit Šadeiko	Estonia				DNS		0	DNF

=== 800 metres ===
Rank	Heat	Name	Nationality	Time	Notes	Points	Total
1	2	Xénia Krizsán	Hungary	2:11.18		947	6266
2	1	Verena Preiner	Austria	2:12.03		935	6050
3	2	Ivona Dadic	Austria	2:12.83	SB	924	6408
4	1	Katsiaryna Netsviatayeva	Belarus	2:13.72		911	6021
5	2	Katerina Cachová	Czech Republic	2:13.91		908	6051
6	2	Györgyi Zsivoczky-Farkas	Hungary	2:14.14		905	6144
7	1	Valérie Reggel	Switzerland	2:14.58		899	5667
8	1	Anna Maiwald	Germany	2:14.92	PB	894	6020
9	1	Michelle Zeltner	Switzerland	2:15.38		887	6010
10	1	Yana Maksimava	Belarus	2:18.30		847	5702
11	2	Sofia Ifantidou	Greece	2:18.59		843	6025
12	2	Antoinette Nana Djimou	France	2:19.33	SB	833	6458
13	2	Anouk Vetter	Netherlands	2:21.50		803	6626
	1	Linda Züblin	Switzerland	DNF		0	4960
	2	Austra Skujytė	Lithuania	DNF		0	5245
		Mari Klaup	Estonia	DNS		0	DNF
		Nadine Broersen	Netherlands	DNS		0	DNF

=== Final results ===
Rank	Name	Nationality	Points	Notes
1st place, gold medalist(s)	Anouk Vetter	Netherlands	6626	NR
2nd place, silver medalist(s)	Antoinette Nana Djimou	France	6458	SB
3rd place, bronze medalist(s)	Ivona Dadic	Austria	6408	NR
4	Xénia Krizsán	Hungary	6266	
5	Györgyi Zsivoczky-Farkas	Hungary	6144	
6	Katerina Cachová	Czech Republic	6051	
7	Verena Preiner	Austria	6050	PB
8	Sofia Ifantidou	Greece	6025	SB
9	Katsiaryna Netsviatayeva	Belarus	6021	SB
10	Anna Maiwald	Germany	6020	SB
11	Michelle Zeltner	Switzerland	6010	PB
12	Yana Maksimava	Belarus	5702	
13	Valérie Reggel	Switzerland	5667	
14	Austra Skujytė	Lithuania	5245	
15	Linda Züblin	Switzerland	4960	
	Mari Klaup	Estonia	DNF	
	Nadine Broersen	Netherlands	DNF	
	Hanna Kasyanova	Ukraine	DNF	
	Grit Šadeiko	Estonia	DNF	
	Morgan Lake	Great Britain	DNF	
	Karolina Tymińska	Poland	DNF	
