= 2019 European Combined Events Team Championships =

- Organisers: European Athletics
- Edition: 34th
- Date: 6–7 July
- Host city: Lutsk, Ukraine (Super League); Ribeira Brava, Portugal (1st, 2nd League)
- Venue: Avanhard Stadium; Centro Desportivo da Madeira

The 2019 European Combined Events Team Championships was the 34th edition of the biennial international team track and field competition for European combined track and field events specialists, with contests in men's decathlon and women's heptathlon. Held over 6–7 July, it consisted of three divisions: Super League, 1st League, and 2nd League. The Super League events were held at Avanhard Stadium in Lutsk, Ukraine, while the lower divisions were held at the Centro Desportivo da Madeira in Ribeira Brava, Portugal. National teams were ranked on the combined points totals of their best three athletes in both men's and women's competitions.

Estonia won the Super League competition, led by Maicel Uibo and Mari Klaup-McColl. The Czech Republic and Finland took first and second in the 1st League to gain promotion to the Super League. Belgium and Ireland were the top two nations in the 2nd League, earning promotion to the 1st League. The best individual performers across the championships were Belarusian Vital Zhuk in the decathlon, with 8237 points, and Ukraine's Daryna Sloboda, with a personal best of 6165 points in the heptathlon.

== Divisions ==
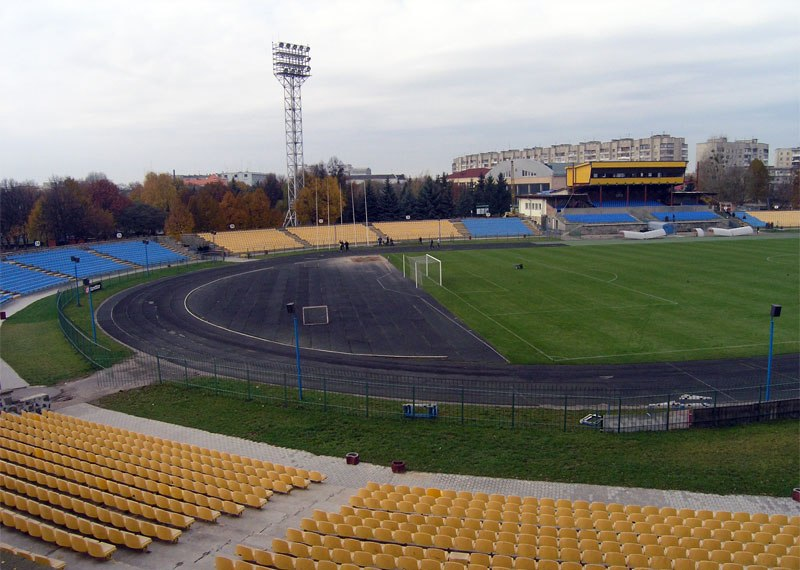
The host stadium in Lutsk

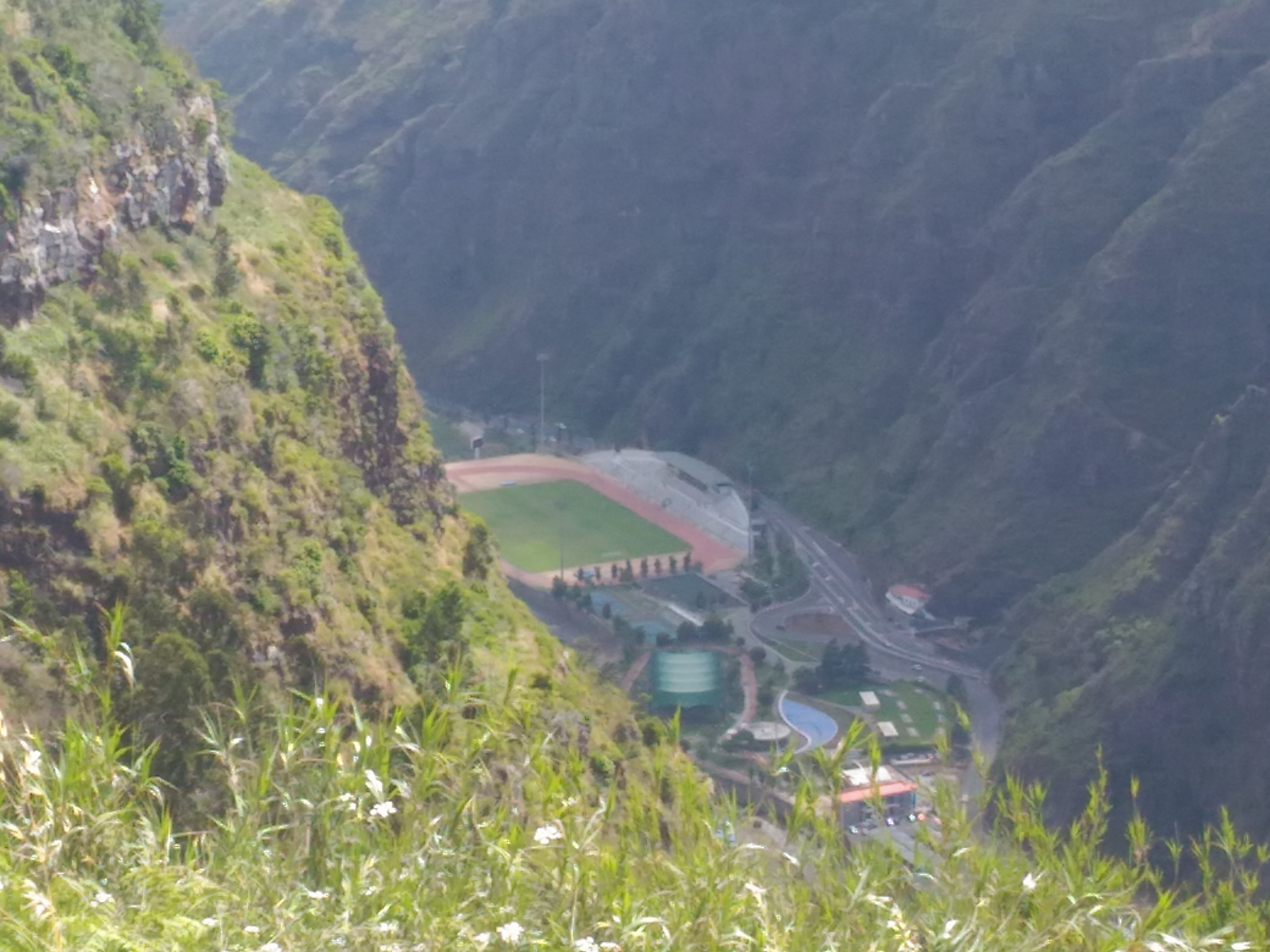
The host stadium in Ribeira Brava

Division	Date	Location	Country
Super League	6–7 July 2019	Lutsk	Ukraine
1st League	6–7 July 2019	Ribeira Brava	Portugal
2nd League	6–7 July 2019	Ribeira Brava	Portugal

== Super League ==
=== Participation ===
- Estonia
- Belarus
- Great Britain
- Ukraine
- Spain (promoted from 1st League)
- France
- Switzerland
- Netherlands (promoted from 1st League)

The Netherlands competed in the women's heptathlon only.

=== Decathlon ===
Rank	Athlete	Nation	Points	Notes
1st place, gold medalist(s)	Vital Zhuk	Belarus	8237	SB
2nd place, silver medalist(s)	Maicel Uibo	Estonia	8181	
3rd place, bronze medalist(s)	Jorge Ureña	Spain	8073	
4	Kristjan Rosenberg	Estonia	8033	PB
5	Janek Õiglane	Estonia	7996	
6	Axel Hubert	France	7743	
7	John Lane	Great Britain	7726	
8	Pablo Trescoli	Spain	7699	
9	Yury Yaremich	Belarus	7680	SB
10	Bastien Auzeil	France	7633	
11	Andrew Murphy	Great Britain	7594	PB
12	Eduard Mikhan	Belarus	7500	
13	Lewis Church	Great Britain	7422	PB
14	Julien Olivas	France	7419	
15	Andrei Krauchanka	Belarus	7404	
16	Risto Lillemets	Estonia	7382	
17	Ruslan Malohlovets	Ukraine	7353	
18	Ben Gregory	Great Britain	7233	
19	Vadym Adamchuk	Ukraine	7165	
20	Jesús Castillo	Spain	7157	
21	Vasyl Ivanytskyy	Ukraine	7147	
22	Karly Maisonneuve	France	7034	
23	Pascal Magyar	Switzerland	6984	
24	Fabian Steffen	Switzerland	6583	
25	Matthias Steinmann	Switzerland	6328	
—	Jonay Jordán	Spain	DNF	
—	Andri Oberholzer	Switzerland	DNF	
—	Oleksiy Kasyanov	Ukraine	DNF	

=== Heptathlon ===
Rank	Athlete	Nation	Points	Notes
1st place, gold medalist(s)	Daryna Sloboda	Ukraine	6165	PB
2nd place, silver medalist(s)	Katie Stainton	Great Britain	6029	PB
3rd place, bronze medalist(s)	Marijke Esselink	Netherlands	5905	PB
4	Iryna Rofe-Beketova	Ukraine	5705	PB
5	Rimma Buinenko	Ukraine	5685	SB
6	Michelle Oud	Netherlands	5669	PB
7	Carmen Ramos	Spain	5643	SB
8	Anaelle Nyabeu Djapa	France	5636	
9	Anne van de Wiel	Netherlands	5593	
10	Yulia Rout	Belarus	5573	
11	Celine Albisser	Switzerland	5539	
12	Mari Klaup-McColl	Estonia	5477	SB
13	Myke van de Wiel	Netherlands	5442	
14	Jo Rowland	Great Britain	5399	SB
15	Dziyana Rabkova	Belarus	5372	PB
16	Bárbara Hernando	Spain	5316	
17	Meriem Sahnoune	France	5299	
18	Ellen Barber	Great Britain	5263	
19	Hanna Nelepa	Ukraine	5246	PB
20	Michelle Baumer	Switzerland	5236	
21	Lena Wunderlin	Switzerland	5199	SB
22	Sharlota Paehlitse	Belarus	5198	
23	Agathe Guillemot	France	5175	
24	Sandra Röthlin	Switzerland	5172	
25	Hanna-Mai Vaikla	Estonia	5168	SB
26	Maryia Vasilevich	Belarus	5114	
27	Kristella Jurkatamm	Estonia	5104	
28	Andrea Medina	Spain	5089	
29	Valvanuz Cañizo	Spain	5056	
29	Sandra Jacmaire	France	4958	
—	Grit Šadeiko	Estonia	DNF	
—	Jessica Taylor-Jemmett	Great Britain	DNF	

=== Team ===
Czech Republic and Netherlands were relegated to the 1st League

Rank	Nation	Points
1	Estonia	39,959
2	Belarus	39,560
3	Great Britain	39,433
4	Ukraine	39,220
5	Spain	38,977
6.	France	38,905
7.	Czech Republic	35,869
–	Netherlands	

== 1st League ==
=== Decathlon ===
Rank	Athlete	Nation	Points	Notes
1st place, gold medalist(s)	Jiří Sýkora	Czech Republic	8104	SB
2nd place, silver medalist(s)	Jan Doležal	Czech Republic	8083	
3rd place, bronze medalist(s)	Fredrik Samuelsson	Sweden	7930	
4	Paweł Wiesiołek	Poland	7753	
5	Marek Lukáš	Czech Republic	7743	
6	Elmo Savola	Finland	7660	SB
7	Reinis Krēgers	Latvia	7392	SB
8	Krišjānis Beļaunieks	Latvia	7108	PB
9	Juuso Hassi	Finland	7090	
10	Adam Helcelet	Czech Republic	7060	
11	Krzysztof Miara	Poland	7027	
12	Matteo Taviani	Italy	7024	PB
13	Rasmus Elfgaard	Sweden	7017	PB
14	Michał Krawczyk	Poland	6981	
15	Petri Ihander	Finland	6944	PB
16	Matteo Di Prima	Italy	6901	
17	Jonathan Carbe	Sweden	6892	SB
18	Lorenzo Naidon	Italy	6880	PB
19	Niks Samauskis	Latvia	6504	PB
20	Eetu Kangas	Finland	6052	
—	Kevin Fankl	Sweden	DNF	
—	Pēteris Krauja	Latvia	DNF	
—	Jacek Chochorowski	Poland	DNF	

=== Heptathlon ===
Rank	Athlete	Nation	Points	Notes
1st place, gold medalist(s)	Kateřina Cachová	Czech Republic	6034	SB
2nd place, silver medalist(s)	Jutta Heikkinen	Finland	5795	PB
3rd place, bronze medalist(s)	Paulina Ligarska	Poland	5589	
4	Federica Palumbo	Italy	5497	PB
5	Beatrice Lantz	Sweden	5477	PB
6	Saga Vanninen	Finland	5449	WYL PB
7	Barbora Dvořáková	Czech Republic	5438	SB
8	Enrica Cipolloni	Italy	5418	SB
9	Sveva Gerevini	Italy	5410	
10	Lisa Linnell	Sweden	5369	
11	Patrycja Skórzewska	Poland	5360	
12	Amanda Liljendal	Finland	5274	
13	Laura Oberto	Italy	5169	
14	Tereza Elena Šínová	Czech Republic	5117	
15	Denisa Majerová	Czech Republic	5104	
16	Iina-Kaisa Mäkelä	Finland	4784	
17	Ilona Dramačonoka	Latvia	4715	SB
18	Zane Zemīte	Latvia	4678	
19	Krista Sprūde	Latvia	4660	
20	Wiktoria Zezula	Poland	4609	
21	Milena Chałupka	Poland	4282	
22	Elvira Carlén	Sweden	4265	
—	Luīze Opolā	Latvia	DNF	
—	Emma Stenlöf	Sweden	DNF	

=== Team ===
Czech Republic and Finland were promoted to the Super League, while Sweden and Latvia were relegated to the 2nd League

Rank	Land	Points
1	Czech Republic	40,519
2	Finland	38,212
3	Poland	37,319
4	Italy	37,130
5	Sweden	36,950
6	Latvia	35,057

== 2nd League ==
Belgium and Ireland were promoted to the 1st League

=== Individual ===
Event	Gold		Silver		Bronze	
Decathlon	Niels Pittomvils (BEL)	7837 pts SB	Michael Bowler (IRL)	7379 pts	Sander Maes (BEL)	7303 pts SB
Heptathlon	Noor Vidts (BEL)	6027 pts	Lucia Vadlejch (SVK)	5755 pts	María Rún Gunnlaugsdóttir (ISL)	5562 pts PB

=== Team ===
Rank	Nation	Points
1	Belgium	38,165
2	Ireland	35,821
3	Denmark	34,240
4	Romania	33,260
5	Turkey	32,292
