= Jonathan Carbe =

Swedish decathlete

Personal information
- Nationality: Swedish
- Born: March 22, 1990 (age 36)

Sport
- Sport: Athletics
- Event(s): Decathlon, 400 metres hurdles
- Club: Örgryte IS

Achievements and titles
- Personal bests: 400mH: 51.69 (2013); Decathlon: 6892pts (2019)

Jonathan Carbe (born 22 March 1990) is a Swedish decathlete and hurdler. He was the 2013 Swedish champion in the 400 m hurdles.

== Biography ==
Carbe started competing in athletics meetings as early as 2003 at the age of 13. His first appearances at the Swedish Athletics Championships was in 2008, when he won the junior heptathlon indoors and placed 6th in the 400 metres at the senior level outdoors. His first senior national title came five years later, when at the 2013 Swedish Championships he won the 400 metres hurdles in a personal best time of 51.69 seconds.

Carbe's first international championship was at the 2015 European Athletics Team Championships, in the 400 metres hurdles. He ran a time of 51.89 seconds in the second of a two-heat final, placing 6th in his heat and 12th overall.

Carbe would go on to compete in the decathlon at the 2017 European Combined Events Team Championships and 2019 European Combined Events Team Championships, finishing 26th and 17th respectively. At the 2019 championships, Carbe recorded his personal best score of 6892 points.

Carbe's best national finish in the decathlon was 2nd place, which he achieved at the 2018 Swedish Athletics Championships. Carbe currently trains with the Örgryte IS athletics club.

== Statistics ==
=== Personal bests ===
Event	Mark	Competition	Venue	Date
400 metres hurdles	51.69	Swedish Athletics Championships	Borås, Sweden	1 September 2013
Decathlon	6892 pts	European Combined Events Team Championships	Ribeira Brava, Portugal	6 July 2019
