= 2017 European Combined Events Team Championships =

- Organisers: European Athletics
- Edition: 33rd
- Date: 1–2 July
- Host city: Tallinn, Estonia (Super League); Monzón, Spain (1st, 2nd League)
- Venue: Kadriorg Stadium; Pista de Atletismo de Monzón

The 2017 European Combined Events Team Championships was the 33rd edition of the biennial international team track and field competition for European combined track and field events specialists, with contests in men's decathlon and women's heptathlon. It was the first edition to be held under that name, following a rebranding away from European Cup Combined Events. Held over 1–2 July, it consisted of three divisions: Super League, 1st League, and 2nd League. The Super League events were held at Kadriorg Stadium in Tallinn, Estonia, while the lower divisions were held at the Pista de Atletismo de Monzón in Monzón, Spain. National teams were ranked on the combined points totals of their best three athletes in both men's and women's competitions.

Ukraine won the Super League competition, led by Oleksiy Kasyanov and Alina Shukh. The Netherlands and Spain took first and second in the 1st League to gain promotion to the Super League. Lithuania and Latvia were the top two nations in the 2nd League, earning promotion to the 1st League. The best individual performers across the championships were Estonian Janek Õiglane in the decathlon, with a personal best of 8170 points, and Dutchwoman Nadine Broersen, with 6326 points in the heptathlon.

The reigning team champion Russia did not compete in the competition due to the nation's ban from international athletics for doping.

== Divisions ==
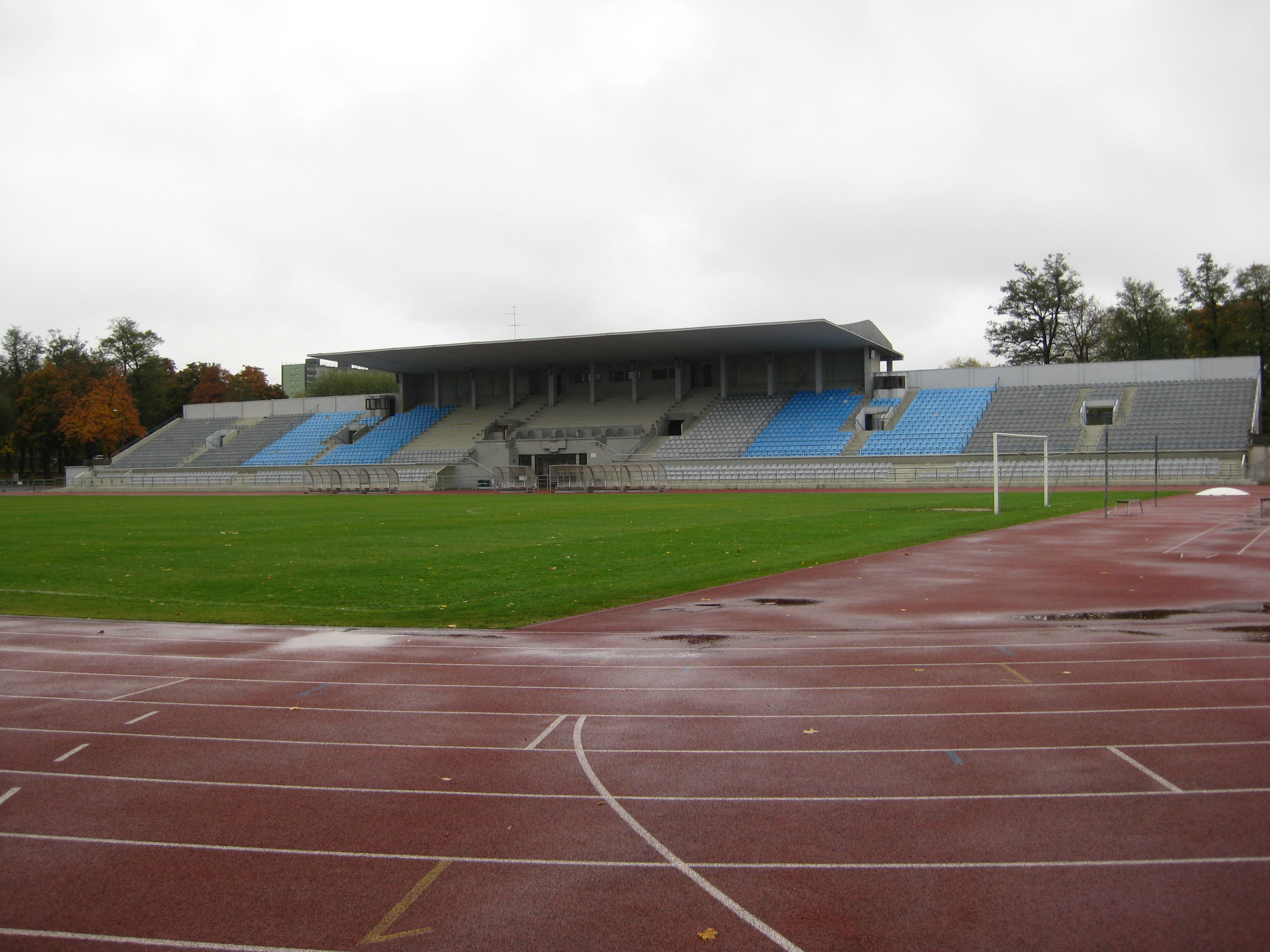
The host stadium in Tallinn

Division	Date	Location	Country
Super League	1–2 July 2017	Tallinn	Estonia
1st League	1–2 July 2017	Monzón	Spain
2nd League	1–2 July 2017	Monzón	Spain

== Super League ==
=== Decathlon ===
Rank	Athlete	Nation	Points	Notes
1st place, gold medalist(s)	Janek Õiglane	Estonia	8170	PB
2nd place, silver medalist(s)	Oleksiy Kasyanov	Ukraine	7958	
3rd place, bronze medalist(s)	Karl Robert Saluri	Estonia	7837	
4	Vasyl Ivanytskyy	Ukraine	7801	PB
5	Jérémy Lelièvre	France	7798	
6	Maxime Maugein	France	7741	SB
7	Maksim Andraloits	Belarus	7669	PB
8	Vital Zhuk	Belarus	7612	PB
9	Ruben Gado	France	7548	
10	Ben Gregory	Great Britain	7530	
11	John Lane	Great Britain	7348	
12	Benjamin Fenrich	France	7339	
13	Pascal Magyar	Switzerland	7318	
14	Ruslan Malohlovets	Ukraine	7160	
15	Andrew Murphy	Great Britain	7084	
16	Uladzimir Bialiuk	Belarus	6986	
17	Flavien Antille	Switzerland	6976	
18	Valentyn Oliynyk	Ukraine	6817	SB
19	Paweł Basałygo	Poland	6765	PB
20	Markus Leemet	Estonia	6752	
21	Rafał Horbowicz	Poland	6733	PB
22	Luca Di Tizio	Switzerland	6468	
—	Michał Krawczyk	Poland	DNF	
—	Kristjan Rosenberg	Estonia	DNF	
—	Yury Yaremich	Belarus	DNF	
—	James Finney	Great Britain	DNF	
—	Fabian Marugg	Switzerland	DNF	
—	Jacek Chochorowski	Poland	DNF	

=== Heptathlon ===
Rank	Athlete	Nation	Points	Notes
1st place, gold medalist(s)	Alina Shukh	Ukraine	6208	NJR
2nd place, silver medalist(s)	Géraldine Ruckstuhl	Switzerland	6134	
3rd place, bronze medalist(s)	Grit Šadeiko	Estonia	5958	
4	Ellen Sprunger	Switzerland	5813	SB
5	Esther Turpin	France	5745	
6	Jessica Jemmett	Great Britain	5702	SB
7	Mari Klaup	Estonia	5696	
8	Izabela Mikołajczyk	Poland	5588	
9	Yuliya Rout	Belarus	5567	PB
=10	Cassandre Aguessy Thomas	France	5518	
=10	Jo Rowland	Great Britain	5518	
12	Daryna Sloboda	Ukraine	5484	
13	Rimma Hordiyenko	Ukraine	5474	
14	Diane Marie-Hardy	France	5421	
15	Margit Kalk	Estonia	5366	
16	Hanna-Mai Vaikla	Estonia	5236	
17	Patrycja Adamczyk	Poland	5207	
18	Lucy Turner	Great Britain	5199	
19	Lena Wunderlin	Switzerland	5184	PB
20	Paulina Ligarska	Poland	5149	
21	Marika Marlicka	Poland	5114	
22	Katsiaryna Netsviatayeva	Belarus	5113	
23	Asya Bardis	Ukraine	5098	
24	Michelle Baumer	Switzerland	5094	PB
25	Hanna Haradskaya	Belarus	5051	SB
—	Zoe Hughes	Great Britain	DNF	
—	Laura Arteil	France	DNF	

=== Team ===
Russia and Poland did not compete at the competition, thus were automatically relegated to the 1st League

Rank	Nation	Points
1	Ukraine	40,085
2	Estonia	39,779
3	France	39,771
4	Great Britain	38,381
5	Belarus	37,998
6	Switzerland	37,893

== First League ==
=== Decathlon ===
Rank	Athlete	Nation	Points	Notes
1st place, gold medalist(s)	Jorge Ureña	Spain	8121	PB
2nd place, silver medalist(s)	Marcus Nilsson	Sweden	7987	SB
3rd place, bronze medalist(s)	Bas Markies	Netherlands	7624	SB
4	Jonay Jordán	Spain	7505	
5	Sebastian Ruthström	Sweden	7467	PB
6	Samuel Remédios	Portugal	7378	PB
7	Rik Taam	Netherlands	7375	
8	Vicente Guardiola	Spain	7322	
9	Luca Dell'acqua	Italy	7262	PB
10	Sybren Blok	Netherlands	7250	SB
11	Juuso Hassi	Finland	7239	SB
12	Tommy Barrineau	Finland	7238	
13	Loek Van Zevenbergen	Netherlands	7148	
14	Ondřej Kopecký	Czech Republic	7114	
15	Mario Arancon	Spain	7070	
16	Eetu Kangas	Finland	6995	PB
17	Tomáš Pulíček	Czech Republic	6957	PB
18	Andreas Gustafsson	Sweden	6936	
19	Roberto Paoluzzi	Italy	6788	
20	Gianluca Simionato	Italy	6778	
21	Razvan George Roman	Romania	6743	
22	Adam Hromčík	Czech Republic	6640	
23	Radoš Rykl	Czech Republic	6615	
24	Pedro Ferreira	Portugal	6324	PB
25	Tiago Boucela	Portugal	5928	SB
26	Jonathan Carbe	Sweden	5856	SB
27	Alexandru Vlad	Romania	5744	SB
28	Ville-Veikko Hanninen	Finland	5727	
29	Costica Marian Muresan	Romania	5429	SB
—	Andrei Alexandru Bugheanu	Romania	DNF	
—	Simone Cairoli	Italy	DNF	

=== Heptathlon ===
Rank	Athlete	Nation	Points	Notes
1st place, gold medalist(s)	Nadine Broersen	Netherlands	6326	SB
2nd place, silver medalist(s)	Eliška Klučinová	Czech Republic	6003	
3rd place, bronze medalist(s)	Lecabela Quaresma	Portugal	5861	
4	Hertta Heikkinen	Finland	5591	
5	Malin Skogström	Sweden	5504	SB
6	Carmen Ramos	Spain	5500	
7	Maria Huntington	Finland	5496	PB
8	Jutta Heikkinen	Finland	5481	SB
9	Jana Novotná	Czech Republic	5474	
10	Lisanne Drost	Netherlands	5451	
11	Carmen Romero	Spain	5450	PB
12	Miia Sillman	Finland	5390	
13	Barbora Zatloukalová	Czech Republic	5378	SB
14	Michelle Oud	Netherlands	5360	
15	Beatrice Lantz	Sweden	5353	PB
16	Federica Palumbo	Italy	5286	
17	Lucia Quaglieri	Italy	5263	PB
18	Andrea Medina	Spain	5255	
19	Eleonora Ferrero	Italy	5232	PB
20	Sveva Gerevini	Italy	5227	
21	Anne van de Wiel	Netherlands	5193	
22	Anamaria Ioniță	Romania	5175	SB
23	Emelie Nyman Wänseth	Sweden	5129	
24	Rafaela Vitorino	Portugal	5127	
25	Catarina Fonseca	Portugal	5113	PB
26	Florentina Budica	Romania	4576	SB
27	Ana Maria Tudor	Romania	4194	SB
28	Elena Ionela Popescu	Romania	3683	PB
—	Kateřina Cachová	Czech Republic	DNF	
—	Yanira Soto	Spain	DNF	

=== Team ===
Rank	Nation	Points	Notes
1	Netherlands	39.,386	Promoted to Super League
2	Spain	39,153	Promoted to Super League
3	Sweden	38,376	
4	Finland	38,040	
5	Czech Republic	37,566	
6	Italy	36,609	
7	Portugal	35,731	Relegated to 2nd League
8	Romania	21,861	Relegated to 2nd League

== Second League ==
=== Decathlon ===
Rank	Athlete	Nation	Points	Notes
1st place, gold medalist(s)	Martin Roe	Norway	8144	PB
2nd place, silver medalist(s)	Lars Vikan Rise	Norway	7448	
3rd place, bronze medalist(s)	Edgars Eriņš	Latvia	7234	SB
4	Tristan Freyr Jónsson	Iceland	7078	PB
5	Michael Bowler	Ireland	7032	PB
6	Egidijus Zaniauskas	Lithuania	7001	PB
7	Christian Laugesen	Denmark	6978	SB
8	Christian Lind Nielsen	Denmark	6963	PB
9	Alvydas Misius	Lithuania	6936	SB
10	Krišjānis Beļaunieks	Latvia	6913	PB
11	Willem Geuskens	Belgium	6787	SB
12	Algirdas Stuknys	Lithuania	6778	
13	Shane Aston	Ireland	6564	SB
14	Ísak Óli Traustason	Iceland	6502	PB
15	Yunus Pehlevan	Turkey	6370	PB
16	Ingi Rúnar Kristinsson	Iceland	6353	
17	Reinis Krēgers	Latvia	6300	
18	Oliver Ryborg Kjeldsen	Denmark	6240	
19	Rolus Olusa	Ireland	5885	SB
20	Ramazan Can	Turkey	5797	PB
21	Ahmet Mustafa Yılmaz	Turkey	5791	PB
22	Reno Apinis	Latvia	5585	PB
23	İshak Tok	Turkey	5309	PB
24	Gunnar Eyjólfsson	Iceland	5295	
—	Panayiótis Mántis	Greece	DNF	
—	Niels Pittomvils	Belgium	DNF	
—	Henrik Holmberg	Norway	DNF	

=== Heptathlon ===
Rank	Athlete	Nation	Points	Notes
1st place, gold medalist(s)	Lucia Vadlejch	Slovakia	5816	
2nd place, silver medalist(s)	Austra Skujytė	Lithuania	5784	SB
3rd place, bronze medalist(s)	Kate O'Connor	Ireland	5632	PB
4	Sofía Ifantídou	Greece	5622	
5	Diana Pranckutė	Lithuania	5341	PB
6	Sandra Bøll	Denmark	5293	SB
7	Ida Marcussen	Norway	5255	
8	Kristīne Deruma	Latvia	5116	PB
9	María Rún Gunnlaugsdóttir	Iceland	4998	SB
10	Miglė Liepa Muraškaitė	Lithuania	4998	PB
11	Irma Gunnarsdóttir	Iceland	4927	
12	Kristiāna Zacmane	Latvia	4897	
13	Mathilde Diekema Jensen	Denmark	4829	
14	Jolanta Kaupe	Latvia	4801	
15	Nickoline Skifter Andersen	Denmark	4723	PB
16	Amy McTeggart	Ireland	4681	PB
17	Ilona Dramačonoka	Latvia	4600	SB
18	Helga Margrét Haraldsdóttir	Iceland	4065	PB
—	Stilianí Tzikanoúla	Greece	DNF	
—	Charlotte Lund Abrahamsen	Norway	DNF	
—	Lucia Mokrášová	Slovakia	DNF	
—	Frida Thorsås	Norway	DNF	
—	Sarah Connolly	Ireland	DNF	

=== Team ===
Rank	Nation	Points	Notes
1	Lithuania	36,838	Promoted to 1st League
2	Latvia	35,261	Promoted to 1st League
3	Denmark	35,026	
4	Iceland	33,923	
