= European Combined Events Team Championships =

Track and field competition

- Sport: Athletics
- Founded: 1973
- Continent: Europe
- Most recent champion: Estonia (2019)
- Website: Website

The European Combined Events Team Championships is a track and field competition for European combined track and field events specialists, with contests in men's decathlon event and women's heptathlon. It is organised by European Athletics. It was held annually in 1993–2011 and biennially in 1973–1993 and 2011–2019.

It was known as the European Cup Combined Events prior to 2017.

== Format ==
It is an international team event, where the points of each nation's top three performers are tallied to form an overall team score. The European Cup Combined Events takes place in three separate divisions – the Super, First, and Second Leagues – and nations gain promotion and relegation between the leagues depending upon their performance. Since 2013 there is a single overall competition winner determined by a combination of men's and women's performances, rather than as separate competitions for men and women. The three league contests take place over the same two-day period, but are held at different European locations.

The event provides multi-eventers with the opportunity to take part in national team events that is afforded to individual event athletes by the European Athletics Team Championships, the European Marathon Cup, the European Half Marathon Cup and the team events at the European Cross Country Championships.

== History ==
Organised by the European Athletic Association (EAA), the competition was first held in Bonn, West Germany in 1973 as a biennial event for the men's decathlon and women's pentathlon. The women's heptathlon superseded the pentathlon in 1981. For the first five editions (1973–1981), the competition featured semi-final and final stages, but a league format with A, B and C divisions was adopted at the 1983 event. The biennial schedule was changed to an annual one from the 1993 Cup onwards, at which point the league names took on their current titles. Since 2011 the competition does not take place in Olympic years.

The competition is one of a series of international team athletics competitions held by the EAA on a yearly basis, alongside the European Team Championships for individual track and field events, the European Cup 10000m, European Cup Race Walking and the European Cup Winter Throwing meet.

Individual performances in the Super league section of the competition qualify for the IAAF World Combined Events Challenge, which is an international series for athletes competing in combined events.

== Super league / A Finals / Finals ==
=== Editions ===
Edition	Year	Name	Gender	City	Country	Date
1st	1973	Final	Men/Women	Bonn	West Germany	22–23 September
2nd	1975	Final	Men/Women	Bydgoszcz	Poland	6–7 September
3rd	1977	Final	Men/Women	Lille	France	17–18 September
4th	1979	Final	Men/Women	Dresden	East Germany	1–2 September
5th	1981	Final	Men/Women	Birmingham	United Kingdom	29–30 August
6th	1983	A Final	Men/Women	Sofia	Bulgaria	7–8 September
7th	1985	A Final	Men/Women	Krefeld-Uerdingen	West Germany	7–8 September
8th	1987	A Final	Men	Basel	Switzerland	4–5 July
8th	1987	A Final	Women	Arles	France	4–5 July
9th	1989	A Final	Men	Tønsberg	Norway	15–16 July
9th	1989	A Final	Women	Helmond	Netherlands	15–16 July
10th	1991	A Final	Men/Women	Helmond	Netherlands	6–7 July
11th	1993	Super league	Men/Women	Oulu	Finland	10–11 July
12th	1994	Super league	Men/Women	Lyon	France	2–3 July
13th	1995	Super league	Men	Valladolid	Spain	
13th	1995	Super league	Women	Helmond	Netherlands	6–7 July
14th	1996	Super league	Men/Women	Lage	Germany	15–16 July
15th	1997	Super league	Men	Tallinn	Estonia	28–29 June
15th	1997	Super league	Women	Oulu	Finland	28–29 June
16th	1998	Super league	Men/Women	Tallinn	Estonia	4–5 July
17th	1999	Super league	Men/Women	Prague	Czech Republic	3–4 July
18th	2000	Super league	Men/Women	Oulu	Finland	1–2 July
19th	2001	Super league	Men/Women	Arles	France	30 June – 1 July
20th	2002	Super league	Men/Women	Bydgoszcz	Poland	29–30 June
21st	2003	Super league	Men/Women	Brixen	Italy	5–6 July
22nd	2004	Super league	Men	Tallinn	Estonia	3–4 July
22nd	2004	Super league	Women	Hengelo	Netherlands	3–4 July
23rd	2005	Super league	Men/Women	Bydgoszcz	Poland	2–3 July
24th	2006	Super league	Men/Women	Arles	France	1–2 July
25th	2007	Super league	Men	Tallinn	Estonia	7–8 July
25th	2007	Super league	Women	Szczecin	Poland	7–8 July
26th	2008	Super league	Men/Women	Hengelo	Netherlands	28–29 June
27th	2009	Super league	Men/Women	Szczecin	Poland	27–28 June
28th	2010	Super league	Men/Women	Tallinn	Estonia	26–27 June
29th	2011	Super league	Men/Women	Toruń	Poland	2–3 July
30th	2013	Super league	Men/Women	Tallinn	Estonia	29–30 June
31st	2014	Super league	Men/Women	Toruń	Poland	6–7 July
32nd	2015	Super league	Men/Women	Aubagne	France	4–5 July
33rd	2017	Super league	Men/Women	Tallinn	Estonia	1–2 July
34th	2019	Super League	Men/Women	Lutsk	Ukraine	6–7 July

=== Medallists ===
==== Individual men (decathlon) ====
Year	Gold		Silver		Bronze	
1973	Lennart Hedmark; Sweden	8120	Yves Le Roy; France	7942	Ryszard Skowronek; Poland	7936
1975	Leonid Lytvynenko; Soviet Union	8030	Mykola Avilov; Soviet Union	7973	Ryszard Katus; Poland	7950
1977	Aleksandr Grebenyuk; Soviet Union	8252	Rainer Pottel; East Germany	8096	Guido Kratschmer; West Germany	8086
1979	Siegfried Stark; East Germany	8287	Guido Kratschmer; West Germany	8053	Aleksandr Nevskiy; Soviet Union	7949
1981	Rainer Pottel; East Germany	8311	Jürgen Hingsen; West Germany	8138	Uwe Freimuth; East Germany	8136
1983	Uwe Freimuth; East Germany	8501	Stephan Niklaus; Switzerland	8312	Siegfried Wentz; West Germany	8246
1985	Torsten Voss; East Germany	8352	Aleksandr Nevskiy; Soviet Union	8321	Grigoriy Degtyaryov; Soviet Union	8206
1987	Torsten Voss; East Germany	8445	Uwe Freimuth; East Germany	8220	Thomas Fahner; East Germany	8187
1989	Christian Plaziat; France	8290	Christian Schenk; East Germany	8250	Norbert Demmel; East Germany	8152
1991	Christian Plaziat; France	8518	Christian Schenk; Germany	8402	Alain Blondel; France	8211
1993	Paul Meier; Germany	8366	Christian Plaziat; France	8277	Alain Blondel; France	8204
1994	Christian Plaziat; France	8505	Henrik Dagård; Sweden	8347	Tomáš Dvořák; Czech Republic	8313
1995	Tomáš Dvořák; Czech Republic	8347	Alex Kruger; United Kingdom	8131	Henrik Dagård; Sweden	8114
1996	Frank Busemann; Germany	8522	Kamil Damašek; Czech Republic	8256	Dirk-Achim Pajonk; Germany	8161
1997	Roman Šebrle; Czech Republic	8322	Erki Nool; Estonia	8289	Kamil Damašek; Czech Republic	8172
1998	Erki Nool; Estonia	8628	Roman Šebrle; Czech Republic	8589	Jack Rosendaal; Netherlands	8269w
1999	Tomáš Dvořák; Czech Republic	8994	Roman Šebrle; Czech Republic	8527	Sébastien Levicq; France	8345
2000	Aleksandr Yurkov; Ukraine	8118	Laurent Hernu; France	7943	Zsolt Kürtösi; Hungary	7901
2001	Aleksandr Yurkov; Ukraine	8380	Attila Zsivoczky; Hungary	8218	Laurent Hernu; France	8112
2002	Mike Maczey; Germany	8104	Jaakko Ojaniemi; Finland	7924	Stefan Schmid; Germany	7825
2003	Romain Barras; France	8008	Aleksandr Pogorelov; Russia	7896	Sergey Nikitin; Russia	7850
2004	William Frullani; Italy	7927	Laurent Hernu; France	7921	Indrek Turi; Estonia	7888
2005	Mikk Pahapill; Estonia	8149	Nikolay Tishchenko; Russia	7767	David Gómez; Spain	7698
2006	Romain Barras; France	8416 w	Attila Zsivoczky; Hungary	8390 w	Aleksandr Pogorelov; Russia	8102
2007	Aliaksandr Parkhomenka; Belarus	8101 SB	Mikalai Shubianok; Belarus	8020	Julien Choffart; France	7916 SB
2008	Andrei Krauchanka; Belarus	8585 SB	Romain Barras; France	7974	Andres Raja; Estonia	7964
2009	Andrei Krauchanka; Belarus	8336 SB	Aleksandr Pogorelov; Russia	8313	Oleksiy Kasyanov; Ukraine	8245
2010	Romain Barras; France	8313	Mikk Pahapill; Estonia	8198	Andres Raja; Estonia	8023
2011	Andres Raja; Estonia	8114 SB	Vasiliy Kharlamov; Russia	7935	Gaël Quérin; France	7799
2013	Kevin Mayer; France	8390	Eduard Mikhan; Belarus	8125 SB	Mikk Pahapill; Estonia	8099
2014	Eelco Sintnicolaas; Netherlands	8156	Eduard Mikhan; Belarus	8004	Ingmar Vos; Netherlands	7959
2015	Ilya Shkurenyov; Russia	8378	Oleksiy Kasyanov; Ukraine	8105	Romain Barras; France	8007
2017	Janek Õiglane; Estonia	8170 PB	Oleksiy Kasyanov; Ukraine	7958	Karl Robert Saluri; Estonia	7837
2019	Vital Zhuk; Belarus	8237 SB	Maicel Uibo; Estonia	8181	Jorge Ureña; Spain	8073

==== Individual women ====
===== Pentathlon =====
Event	Gold		Silver		Bronze	
1973	Burglinde Pollak; East Germany	4932	Nadiya Tkachenko; Soviet Union	4695	Margit Olfert; East Germany	4517
1975	Burglinde Pollak; East Germany	4672	Christine Laser; East Germany	4574	Siegrun Thon; East Germany	4508
1977	Nadiya Tkachenko; Soviet Union	4839	Zoya Spasovkhodskaya; Soviet Union	4477	Valentina Dimitrova; Bulgaria	4423
1979	Yekaterina Smirnova; Soviet Union	4717	Kristine Nitzsche; East Germany	4686	Ramona Neubert; East Germany	4602

===== Heptathlon =====
Event	Gold		Silver		Bronze	
1981	Ramona Neubert; East Germany	6391	Heidrun Geissler; East Germany	6223	Sabine Everts; West Germany	6187
1983	Ramona Neubert; East Germany	6722	Yekaterina Smirnova; Soviet Union	6486	Valentina Dimitrova; Bulgaria	6416
1985	Sabine Paetz; East Germany	6595	Natalya Gracheva; Soviet Union	6427	Sibylle Thiele; East Germany	6460
1987	Svetlana Buraga; Soviet Union	6585	Marion Reichelt; East Germany	6442	Marianna Maslennikova; Soviet Union	6434 w
1989	Larisa Nikitina; Soviet Union	6875	Remigija Nazaroviené; Soviet Union	6600	Natalya Shubenkova; Soviet Union	6345
1991	Peggy Beer; Germany	6383	Heike Tischler; Germany	6366	Anke Behmer; Germany	6272
1993	Tatyana Zhuravlyova; Russia	6330	Larisa Nikitina; Russia	6256	Urszula Włodarczyk; Poland	6121
1994	Svetlana Moskalets; Russia	6507	Nathalie Teppe; France	6396	Peggy Beer; Germany	6362
1995	Denise Lewis; United Kingdom	6299	Sharon Jaklofsky; Netherlands	6197	Anzhela Atroshchenko; Belarus	6186
1996	Natalya Sazanovich; Belarus	6466	Mona Steigauf; Germany	6380	Rita Ináncsi; Hungary	6312
1997	Irina Vostrikova; Russia	6298	Urszula Włodarczyk; Poland	6236	Svetlana Moskalets; Russia	6219
1998	Marie Collonvillé; France	6215	Natalya Roshchupkina; Russia	6145	Urszula Włodarczyk; Poland	6144
1999	Eunice Barber; France	6505	Irina Belova; Russia	6291	Irina Vostrikova; Russia	6278
2000	Natalya Roshchupkina; Russia	6377	Tatyana Gordeyeva; Russia	6154	Yelena Chernyavskaya; Russia	6106
2001	Svetlana Sokolova; Russia	6270 w	Sonja Kesselschläger; Germany	6064 w	Tatyana Gordeyeva; Russia	6064 w
2002	Karin Ertl; Germany	6017	Sabine Krieger; Germany	5973	Sonja Kesselschläger; Germany	5950
2003	Yelena Prokhorova; Russia	6313	Irina Butor; Belarus	6264	Argyro Strataki; Greece	6064
2004	Yuliya Ignatkina; Russia	6120	Magdalena Szczepańska; Poland	6115	Argyro Strataki; Greece	5926
2005	Tatyana Alisevich; Belarus	6173	Yvonne Wisse; Netherlands	6026	Diana Koritskaya; Russia	5981
2006	Carolina Klüft; Sweden	6665	Karolina Tymińska; Poland	6402 SB	Ksenja Balta; Estonia	6180 PB
2007	Jessica Ennis; United Kingdom	6399	Kelly Sotherton; United Kingdom	6229	Hanna Melnychenko; Ukraine	6143 SB
2008	Hanna Melnychenko; Ukraine	6306 SB	Antoinette Nana Djimou; France	6204 SB	Jolanda Keizer; Netherlands	6105
2009	Hanna Melnychenko; Ukraine	6380	Kamila Chudzik; Poland	6378	Karolina Tymińska; Poland	6191 SB
2010	Hanna Melnychenko; Ukraine	6098 SB	Marisa De Aniceto; France	6010 SB	Aleksandra Butvina; Russia	5990
2011	Anna Bogdanova; Russia	6225	Lyudmyla Yosypenko; Ukraine	5984	Remona Fransen; Netherlands	5965
2013	Karolina Tymińska; Poland	6347	Hanna Melnychenko; Ukraine	6260	Grit Šadeiko; Estonia	6221 NR PB
2014	Nadine Broersen; Netherlands	6539	Antoinette Nana Djimou; France	6212	Yana Maksimava; Belarus	6173
2015	Alina Fyodorova; Ukraine	6278	Grit Šadeiko; Estonia	6196	Anna Blank; Russia	6037
2017	Alina Shukh; Ukraine	6208	Geraldine Ruckstuhl; Switzerland	6134	Grit Sadeiko; Estonia	5958
2019	Daryna Sloboda; Ukraine	6165 PB	Katie Stainton; United Kingdom	6029 PB	Marijke Esselink; Netherlands	5905 PB

==== Men's team ====
Event	Gold		Silver		Bronze	
1973	Poland	23578	Soviet Union	23434	East Germany	22723
1975	Soviet Union	23631	Poland	22824	Sweden	22763
1977	Soviet Union	24303	West Germany	24049	East Germany	23928
1979	East Germany	24070	West Germany	23755	Soviet Union	23510
1981	West Germany	24363	East Germany	24190	Poland	22880
1983	West Germany	24609	East Germany	24359	Soviet Union	24208
1985	Soviet Union	24639	East Germany	24550	Poland	22564
1987	East Germany	24852	Soviet Union	24307	Switzerland	23537
1989	East Germany	24081	West Germany	23693	Soviet Union	23572
1991	Germany	24350	France	24048	Soviet Union	23687
1993	France	24163	Germany	24025	Finland	23087
1994	France	24864	Czech Republic	23836	Spain	23723
1995	Czech Republic	23826	France	23462	Sweden	23408
1996	Germany	24832	France	24106	Czech Republic	24096
1997	Czech Republic	24416	Estonia	23859	Hungary	23780
1998	Czech Republic	23974	Netherlands	23879	France	23669
1999	Czech Republic	25375	Germany	23467	Spain	23234
2000	France	23496	Ukraine	23165	Russia	23144
2001	France	23933	Ukraine	23779	Finland	23648
2002	Germany	23750	Finland	22798	Russia	22621
2003	France	23538	Russia	23357	Italy	22678
2004	Estonia	23282	Germany	23234	France	23120
2005	Estonia	23139	Russia	22711	Spain	22482
2006	France	24185	Russia	23764	Estonia	22968
2007	Belarus	23749	France	23246	Netherlands	23022
2008	Belarus	24160	Netherlands	23367	France	23268
2009	Russia	24507	Belarus	24077	Ukraine	23621
2010	Estonia	23746	Russia	22742	France	22556
2011	Russia	23305	Estonia	23095	Belarus	22956

==== Women's team ====
Event	Gold		Silver		Bronze	
1973	East Germany	13924	Soviet Union	13351	Bulgaria	12882
1975	East Germany	13754	Soviet Union	13186	West Germany	12751
1977	Soviet Union	13708	West Germany	12835	France	12277
1979	East Germany	13836	Soviet Union	13620	West Germany	13325
1981	East Germany	18682	West Germany	17817	Soviet Union	17480
1983	East Germany	19242	Soviet Union	18698	Bulgaria	18666
1985	East Germany	19108	Soviet Union	18841	West Germany	18662
1987	Soviet Union	19289	France	18477	Czechoslovakia	17879
1989	Soviet Union	19820	West Germany	18532	Finland	17849
1991	Germany	19023	Soviet Union	18434	Poland	18177
1993	Russia	18595	Germany	17708	Poland	17287
1994	Russia	18876	Ukraine	18487	France	18474
1995	Belarus	18150	Germany	17755	Russia	17705
1996	Germany	18659	Belarus	18244	France	17838
1997	Russia	18651	France	18250	Germany	18058
1998	Russia	18331	France	18117	Germany	17923
1999	Russia	18625	France	18285	Poland	18119
2000	Russia	18637	Poland	17759	France	17710
2001	Russia	18350	Germany	18009	Italy	17473
2002	Germany	17940	Russia	17449	Ukraine	17381
2003	Russia	17983	Belarus	17982	Greece	17433
2004	Russia	17872	Poland	17704	Belarus	17024
2005	Belarus	17626	Ukraine	17506	Russia	17487
2006	Russia	18149	Sweden	18078	Finland	17503
2007	United Kingdom	18329	Russia	17289	Ukraine	17243
2008	Ukraine	18187	Russia	17980	France	17482
2009	Poland	18007	Russia	17949	Ukraine	17814
2010	France	17654	Czech Republic	17402	Russia	17301
2011	Russia	17816	Ukraine	17600	France	16992

==== Overall Team ====
Event	Gold		Silver		Bronze	
2013	France	41421	Russia	41032	Estonia	41027
2014	Russia	41159	Netherlands	41048	France	40761
2015	Russia	41700	France	40724	Estonia	39875
2017	Ukraine	40085	Estonia	39779	France	39771
2019	Estonia	39959	Belarus	39560	Great Britain	39433

== First league / B Finals / Semi-Finals ==
=== Editions ===
Edition	Year	Name	Gender	City	Country	Date
1st	1973	Semi-Final	Men/Women	Innsbruck	Austria	
1st	1973	Semi-Final	Men/Women	Sofia	Bulgaria	
1st	1973	Semi-Final	Men/Women	Reykjavík	Iceland	
2nd	1975	Semi-Final	Men/Women	Banská Bystrica	Czechoslovakia	
2nd	1975	Semi-Final	Men/Women	Poiana Brașov	Romania	
2nd	1975	Semi-Final	Men/Women	Barcelona	Spain	
3rd	1977	Semi-Final	Men/Women	Hvidovre	Denmark	
3rd	1977	Semi-Final	Men/Women	Sittard	Netherlands	
3rd	1977	Semi-Final	Men/Women	Kishinev	Soviet Union	
3rd	1977	Semi-Final	Men	Hannover	West Germany	
3rd	1977	Semi-Final	Women	Götzis	Austria	
4th	1979	Semi-Final	Men/Women	Schielleiten	Austria	
4th	1979	Semi-Final	Men/Women	Budapest	Hungary	
4th	1979	Semi-Final	Men/Women	Bremerhaven	West Germany	
5th	1981	Semi-Final	Men/Women	Brussels	Belgium	
5th	1981	Semi-Final	Men/Women	Malmö	Sweden	
5th	1981	Semi-Final	Men/Women	Zug	Switzerland	
6th	1983	B Final	Men/Women	Montargis	France	
7th	1985	B Final	Men/Women	Arles	France	
8th	1987	B Final	Men	Arles	France	4–5 July
8th	1987	B Final	Women	Basel	Switzerland	4–5 July
9th	1989	B Final	Men	Helmond	Netherlands	15–16 July
9th	1989	B Final	Women	Tønsberg	Norway	15–16 July
10th	1991	B Final	Men/Women	Stoke-on-Trent	United Kingdom	
11th	1993	First league	Men/Women	Valladolid	Spain	
12th	1994	First league	Men/Women	Brixen	Italy	
13th	1995	First league	Men	Helmond	Netherlands	6–7 July
13th	1995	First league	Women	Valladolid	Spain	
14th	1996	First league	Men/Women	Tallinn	Estonia	
15th	1997	First league	Men	Oulu	Finland	28–29 June
15th	1997	First league	Women	Tallinn	Estonia	28–29 June
16th	1998	First league	Men/Women	Brixen	Italy	
17th	1999	First league	Men/Women	Huddinge	Sweden	
18th	2000	First league	Men/Women	Ibach/Schwyz	Switzerland	
19th	2001	First league	Men/Women	Ried	Austria	
20th	2002	First league	Men/Women	Riga	Latvia	
21st	2003	First league	Men/Women	Tallinn	Estonia	
22nd	2004	First league	Men	Hengelo	Netherlands	3–4 July
22nd	2004	First league	Women	Tallinn	Estonia	3–4 July
23rd	2005	First league	Men/Women	Jyväskylä	Finland	2–3 July
24th	2006	First league	Men/Women	Yalta	Ukraine	1–2 July
25th	2007	First league	Men	Szczecin	Poland	7–8 July
25th	2007	First league	Women	Tallinn	Estonia	7–8 July
26th	2008	First league	Men/Women	Jyväskylä	Finland	28–29 June
27th	2009	First league	Men/Women	Zaragoza	Spain	27–28 June
28th	2010	First league	Men/Women	Hengelo	Netherlands	26–27 June
29th	2011	First league	Men/Women	Brixen	Italy	2–3 July
30th	2013	First league	Men/Women	Nottwil	Switzerland	29–30 June
31st	2014	First league	Men/Women	Ribeira Brava	Portugal	5–6 July
32nd	2015	First league	Men/Women	Inowrocław	Poland	4–5 July
33rd	2017	First league	Men/Women	Monzón	Spain	1–2 July

=== Men's winners ===
- 1973: Sepp Zeilbauer (AUT) & Yves Le Roy (FRA) & Toomas Suurväli (URS)
- 1975: Luděk Pernica (TCH) & Yves Le Roy (FRA) & Sepp Zeilbauer (AUT)
- 1977: Petr Krátký (TCH) & Guido Kratschmer (FRG) & Mykola Avilov (URS) & Daley Thompson (GBR)
- 1979: Thierry Dubois (FRA) & Viktor Gruzenkin (URS) & Siegfried Stark (GDR)
- 1981: Dariusz Ludwig (POL) & Atanas Andonov (BUL) & Uwe Freimuth (GDR)
- 1983: Kari-Pekka Lax (FIN)
- 1985: Christian Plaziat (FRA)
- 1987: William Motti (FRA)
- 1989: Petri Keskitalo (FIN)
- 1991: Antonio Peñalver (ESP)
- 1993: Alex Kruger (GBR)
- 1994: Vitaliy Kolpakov (UKR)
- 1995: Paul Meier (GER)
- 1996: Erki Nool (EST)
- 1997: Eduard Hämäläinen (FIN)
- 1998: Sebastian Chmara (POL)
- 1999: Lev Lobodin (RUS)
- 2000: Prodromos Korkizoglou (GRE)
- 2001: Chiel Warners (NED)
- 2002: Jan Poděbradský (CZE)
- 2003: Erki Nool (EST)
- 2004: Roland Schwarzl (AUT)
- 2005: Tomáš Dvořák (CZE)
- 2006: Aliaksandr Parkhomenka (BLR)

=== Women's winners ===
- 1973: Ilona Bruzsenyák (HUN) & Marie-Christine Debourse (FRA) & Burglinde Pollak (GDR)
- 1975: Annette Stein (FRG) & Burglinde Pollak (GDR) & Zoya Spasovkhodskaya (URS)
- 1977: Marcela Koblasová (TCH) & Margit Papp (HUN) & Nadiya Tkachenko (URS) & Susan Longden (GBR)
- 1979: Cornelia Sulek (FRG) & Nadezhda Karyakina (URS) & Kristine Nitzsche (GDR)
- 1981: Sabine Everts (FRG) & Nadezhda Vinogradova (URS) & Ramona Neubert (GDR)
- 1983: Tineke Hidding (NED)
- 1985: Chantal Beaugeant (FRA)
- 1987: Ragne Kytölä (FIN)
- 1989: Anke Behmer (GDR)
- 1991: Liliana Năstase (ROM)
- 1993: Clova Court (GBR)
- 1994: Anzhela Atroshchenko (BLR)
- 1995: Rita Ináncsi (HUN)
- 1996: Urszula Włodarczyk (POL)
- 1997: Ester Goossens (NED)
- 1998: Gertrud Bacher (ITA)
- 1999: Virge Naeris (EST)
- 2000: Natallia Sazanovich (BLR)
- 2001: Yuliya Akulenko (UKR)
- 2002: Carolina Klüft (SWE)
- 2003: Carolina Klüft (SWE)
- 2004: Carolina Klüft (SWE)
- 2005: Carolina Klüft (SWE)
- 2006: Argyro Strataki (GRE)

== Second league / C Finals ==
=== Editions ===
Edition	Year	Name	Gender	City	Country	Date
6th	1983	C Final	Men/Women	Graz	Austria	
7th	1985	C Final	Men/Women	Copenhagen	Denmark	
7th	1985	C Final	Men/Women	Bruneck	Italy	
8th	1987	C Final	Men/Women	Madrid	Spain	
9th	1989	C Final	Men/Women	Vienna	Austria	
10th	1991	C Final	Men/Women	Århus	Denmark	
11th	1993	Second league	Men/Women	Hechtel	Belgium	
11th	1993	Second league	Men/Women	Tallinn	Estonia	
12th	1994	Second league	Men/Women	Copenhagen	Denmark	
12th	1994	Second league	Men/Women	Tallinn	Estonia	
13th	1995	Second league	Men/Women	Reykjavík	Iceland	
13th	1995	Second league	Men/Women	Dilbeek	Belgium	
14th	1996	Second league	Men/Women	Riga	Latvia	
15th	1997	Second league	Men/Women	Maribor	Slovenia	
16th	1998	Second league	Men/Women	Reykjavík	Iceland	
16th	1998	Second league	Men/Women	Maribor	Slovenia	
17th	1999	Second league	Men/Women	Herentals	Belgium	
18th	2000	Second league	Men/Women	Esbjerg	Denmark	
19th	2001	Second league	Men/Women	Kaunas	Lithuania	
20th	2002	Second league	Men/Women	Maribor	Slovenia	
21st	2003	Second league	Men/Women	Maribor	Slovenia	
22nd	2004	Second league	Men/Women	Riga	Latvia	
23rd	2005	Second league	Men/Women	Maribor	Slovenia	2–3 July
24th	2006	Second league	Men/Women	Monzón	Spain	1–2 July
25th	2007	Second league	Men/Women	Maribor	Slovenia	7–8 July
26th	2008	Second league	Men/Women	Maribor	Slovenia	28–29 June
27th	2009	Second league	Men/Women	Maribor	Slovenia	27–28 June
28th	2010	Second league	Men/Women	Tel Aviv	Israel	26–27 June
29th	2011	Second league	Men/Women	Ribeira Brava	Portugal	2–3 July
30th	2013	Second league	Men/Women	Ribeira Brava	Portugal	29–30 June
31st	2014	First league	Men/Women	Ribeira Brava	Portugal	5–6 July
32nd	2015	First league	Men/Women	Inowrocław	Poland	4–5 July
33rd	2017	First league	Men/Women	Monzón	Spain	1–2 July

=== Men's winners ===
- 1983: Martin Machura (TCH)
- 1985: Sten Ekberg (SWE) & Marco Rossi (ITA)
- 1987: Dezsõ Szabó (HUN)
- 1989: Antonio Peñalver (ESP)
- 1991: Marco Baffi (ITA)
- 1993: Mário Aníbal (POR) & Igor Matsanov (BLR)
- 1994: Mário Aníbal (POR) & Erki Nool (EST)
- 1995: Jón Arnar Magnússon (ISL) & Leo Hudec (AUT)
- 1996: Sebastian Chmara (POL)
- 1997: Sebastian Chmara (POL)
- 1998: Jón Arnar Magnússon (ISL) & Nikolay Afanasyev (RUS)
- 1999: Trond Høiby (NOR)
- 2000: Rojs Piziks (LAT)
- 2001: Mário Aníbal (POR)
- 2002: Madis Kallas (EST)
- 2003: Yeorgios Andreou (CYP)
- 2004: Jānis Karlivāns (LAT)
- 2005: Aliaksandr Parkhomenka (BLR)
- 2006: François Gourmet (BEL)
- 2007: Hans Olav Uldal (NOR)
- 2008: Edgars Eriņš (LAT)
- 2009: Hans Olav Uldal (NOR)

=== Women's winners ===
- 1983: Marcela Koblasová (TCH)
- 1985: Małgorzata Guzowska (POL) & Katia Pasquinelli (ITA)
- 1987: Anne Brit Skjæveland (NOR)
- 1989: Liliana Năstase (ROM)
- 1991: Athina Papasotiriou (GRE)
- 1993: Sabine De Wachter (BEL) & Svetlana Buraga (BLR)
- 1994: Rita Ináncsi (HUN) & Remigija Nazarovienė (LTU)
- 1995: Lone Nielsen (DEN) & Marcela Podracká (SVK)
- 1996: Valentīna Gotovska (LAT)
- 1997: Desanka Calasan (SLO)
- 1998: Imma Clopés (ESP) & Desanka Calasan (SLO)
- 1999: Rita Ináncsi (HUN)
- 2000: Austra Skujytė (LTU)
- 2001: Larissa Netšeporuk (EST)
- 2002: Austra Skujytė (LTU)
- 2003: Sylvie Dufour (SUI)
- 2004: Austra Skujytė (LTU)
- 2005: Jesenija Volžankina (LAT)
- 2006: Jesenija Volžankina (LAT)
- 2007: Austra Skujytė (LTU)
- 2008: Aiga Grabuste (LAT)
- 2009: Sara Aerts (BEL)
