= Anna Maiwald =

German heptathlete

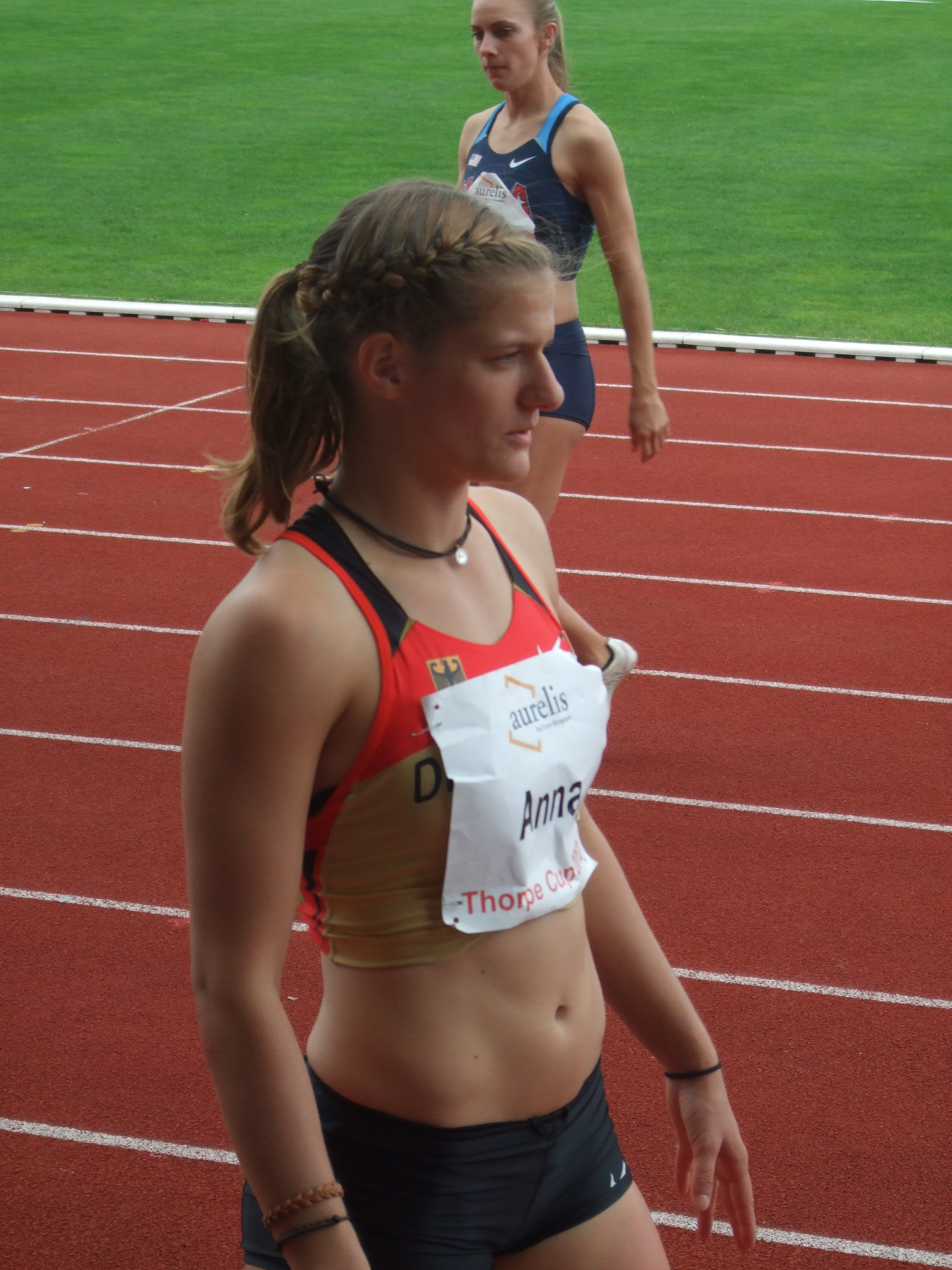
- Maiwald in 2012

Personal information
- Full name: Anna Stephanie Maiwald
- Born: 21 July 1990 (age 35) Heidelberg, Germany
- Height: 176 cm (5 ft 9 in)
- Weight: 65 kg (143 lb)

Sport
- Country: Germany
- Sport: Track and field
- Event: Heptathlon

Anna Stephanie Maiwald (born 21 July 1990) is a German athlete who specialises in the heptathlon. In 2008 Maiwald won the heptathlon at the German under 20 championship.

She competed in the heptathlon event at the 2016 European Championships in Amsterdam, Netherlands. Has won the gold medal in the heptathlon at the 2015 Universiade.

== Personal bests ==
=== Outdoor ===
Discipline	Performance	Wind	Place	Date
200 metres	24.03	0.0	Ulm	27 May 2015
800 metres	2:15.07		Ratingen	28 June 2015
100 metres hurdles	13.53	+1.5	Götzis	28 May 2016
High jump	1.74		Neuwied-Engers	9 May 2015
Long jump	5.93	-0.5	Ratingen	28 June 2015
Shot put	14.13		Ulm	27 May 2015
Javelin throw	46.05		Ratingen	16 June 2013
Heptathlon	6111		Ulm	28 May 2015

=== Indoor ===
Discipline	Performance	Place	Date
800 metres	2:19.95	Hamburg	31 January 2016
60 metres hurdles	8.48	Hamburg	31 January 2016
High jump	1.72	Hamburg	31 January 2016
Long jump	5.68	Hamburg	31 January 2016
Long jump	5.68	Hamburg	7 February 2015
Shot put	13.59	Hamburg	7 February 2015
Pentathlon	4208	Hamburg	31 January 2016
