= Marion Reichelt =

German track-and-field athlete (b. 1962)

Personal information
- Nationality: East German
- Born: 23 December 1962 (age 62)

Sport
- Sport: long jump and heptathlon

Marion Reichelt (née Weser; born 23 December 1962) is a German female former track and field athlete who competed in the long jump and heptathlon for East Germany. She was a heptathlon silver medallist at the European Cup Combined Events in 1987 and set a personal best score of 6442 points, ranking seventh on the world lists for that season. She placed sixth at the 1987 World Championships in Athletics in her only global senior performance. She holds a long jump best of 6.66 m (21 ft 10 in).

She was listed among leaked Stasi documents, published by Brigitte Berendonk, as having been subject to the East German state doping programme.

== International competitions ==
Year	Competition	Venue	Position	Event	Notes
1987	European Cup Combined Events	Arles, France	2nd	Heptathlon	6442 pts
1987	World Championships	Rome, Italy	6th	Heptathlon	6296 pts
