= Michelle Zeltner =

Swiss heptathlete

Personal information
- Nationality: Swiss
- Born: 22 December 1991 (age 33)

Sport
- Country: Switzerland
- Sport: Track and field

Michelle Zeltner (born 22 December 1991) is a Swiss athlete who specialises in the heptathlon. She competed in the heptathlon event at the 2016 European Championships in Amsterdam, Netherlands.

== Personal bests ==
=== Outdoor ===
Discipline	Performance	Wind	Place	Date
200 metres	24.48	0.0	Ratingen	25 June 2016
800 metres	2:15.05		Ratingen	26 June 2016
100 metres hurdles	13.93	-0.9	Amsterdam	8 July 2016
High jump	1.79		Kladno	12 June 2015
Long jump	5.81	+1.6	Ratingen	26 June 2016
Shot put	14.49		Amsterdam	8 July 2016
Javelin throw	39.37		Landquart	24 May 2015
Heptathlon	5871		Ratingen	26 June 2016

=== Indoor ===
Discipline	Performance	Place	Date
800 metres	2:21.40	Tallinn	14 February 2016
60 metres hurdles	8.58	Bordeaux	23 February 2014
High jump	1.81	Tallinn	14 February 2016
Long jump	5.90	Bordeaux	23 February 2014
Shot put	13.89	Bordeaux	23 February 2014
Pentathlon	4369	Tallinn	14 February 2016
Pentathlon	4369	Bordeaux	23 February 2014
