= Tatyana Zhuravlyova =

Russian heptathlete (born 1967)

Tatyana Zhuravlyova (born 19 December 1967) is a retired Russian heptathlete.

She finished eighth at the 1991 World Championships and tenth at the 1993 World Championships.
