= Hans Olav Uldal =

Norwegian track and field athlete (born 1982)

Personal information
- Born: 16 December 1982 (age 43) Arendal, Norway

Sport
- Sport: Track and field
- Club: IK Grane; Sandnes IL

Hans Olav Uldal (born 16 December 1982) is a Norwegian track and field athlete. He was born in Arendal Municipality, and has represented the clubs IK Grane and Sandnes IL. He competed in decathlon at the 2004 Summer Olympics in Athens, where he placed 27th overall.
