= Mari Klaup =

Estonian combined-events athlete

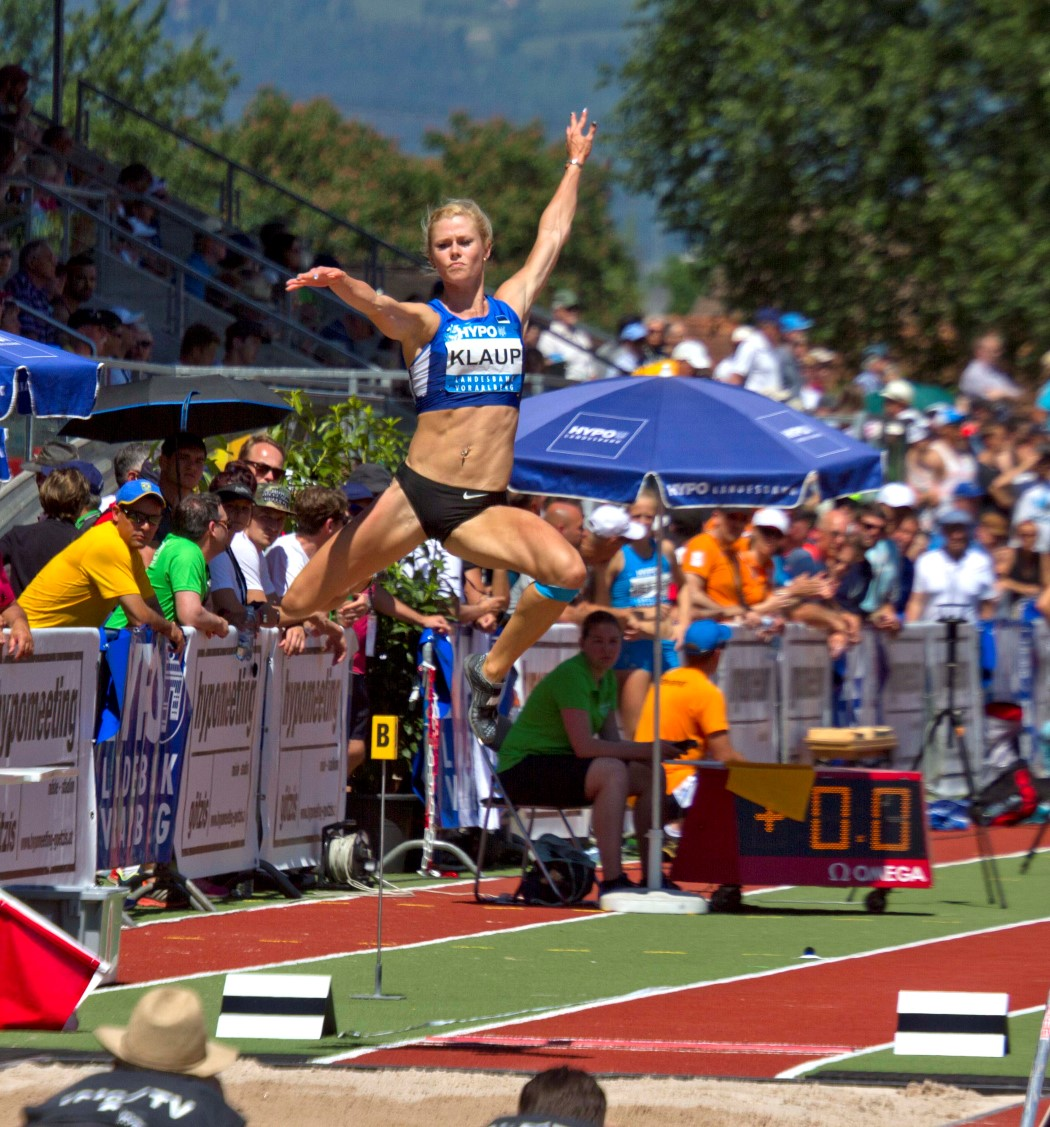

Personal information
- Nationality: Estonian
- Born: 27 February 1990 (age 36) Tartu, then part of Estonian SSR, Soviet Union

Sport
- Country: Estonia
- Sport: Athletics
- Event: Heptathlon

Achievements and titles
- Personal bests: Heptathlon: 6080 points (2020); Indoor pentathlon: 4122 points (2020); Javelin throw: 57.84 m (2021)

Mari Klaup (born 27 February 1990) is an Estonian combined-events athlete who specialises in the heptathlon. She has also competed in the javelin throw.

During part of her career, she competed under the name Mari Klaup-McColl.

== Career ==
Klaup competed internationally as a junior at the 2007 World Youth Championships in Athletics, the 2009 European Athletics Junior Championships and the 2011 European Athletics U23 Championships.

In 2013, she finished seventh in the heptathlon at the Summer Universiade in Kazan, scoring 5,837 points.

Later that year, she represented Estonia at the 2013 World Championships in Athletics in Moscow. She finished 21st in the heptathlon with 5,924 points.

Klaup placed 19th in the heptathlon at the 2014 European Athletics Championships in Zürich, scoring 5,765 points.

She also competed at the 2016 European Athletics Championships in Amsterdam and the 2018 European Athletics Championships in Berlin, but did not complete the heptathlon on either occasion.

In 2020, Klaup improved her heptathlon personal best to 6,080 points in Tallinn.

Earlier in the same year, she set an indoor pentathlon personal best of 4,122 points.

In 2021, she recorded a javelin throw personal best of 57.84 metres.

== International competitions ==
- 2007 – 17th in the heptathlon at the World Youth Championships in Ostrava, with 4,677 points.
- 2009 – 13th in the heptathlon at the European Junior Championships in Novi Sad, with 5,084 points.
- 2011 – 11th in the heptathlon at the European U23 Championships in Ostrava, with 5,445 points.
- 2013 – Seventh in the heptathlon at the Summer Universiade in Kazan, with 5,837 points.
- 2013 – 21st in the heptathlon at the World Championships in Moscow, with 5,924 points.
- 2014 – 19th in the heptathlon at the European Championships in Zürich, with 5,765 points.
- 2016 – Did not finish the heptathlon at the European Championships in Amsterdam.
- 2018 – Did not finish the heptathlon at the European Championships in Berlin.

== Personal bests ==
=== Outdoor ===
- 200 metres – 25.54, Moscow, 12 August 2013
- 800 metres – 2:18.35, Desenzano del Garda, 8 May 2011
- 100 metres hurdles – 13.81, 2020
- High jump – 1.83 m, Rakvere, 27 June 2014
- Long jump – 6.10 m, 2020
- Shot put – 13.40 m, Rakvere, 13 July 2014
- Javelin throw – 57.84 m, 2021
- Heptathlon – 6,080 points, Tallinn, 2020

=== Indoor ===
- 800 metres – 2:23.27, Tallinn, 4 February 2012
- 60 metres hurdles – 8.77, Gothenburg, 31 January 2015
- High jump – 1.82 m, Gothenburg, 3 December 2011
- Long jump – 5.80 m, Tallinn, 6 February 2011
- Shot put – 11.41 m, Tallinn, 6 February 2011
- Pentathlon – 4,122 points, 2020
