= Eritrea at the 2015 World Championships in Athletics =

- WA code: ERI

in Beijing
- Competitors: 9
- Medals Ranked 15th: Gold 1 Silver 0 Bronze 0 Total 1

World Championships in Athletics appearances
- 1997; 1999; 2001; 2003; 2005; 2007; 2009; 2011; 2013; 2015; 2017; 2019; 2022; 2023; 2025

Eritrea competed at the 2015 World Championships in Athletics in Beijing, China, from 22 to 30 August 2015.

On Day 1 (22 August) Ghirmay Ghebreslassie of Eritrea won the men's marathon.

== Medalists ==
Medal	Athlete	Event	Date
Gold	Ghirmay Ghebreslassie	Marathon	22 August

== Results ==
(q – qualified, NM – no mark, SB – season best)

=== Men ===
Track and road events

Athlete	Event	Heat		Semifinal		Final	
Athlete	Event	Result	Rank	Result	Rank	Result	Rank
Aron Kifle	5000 metres	13:25.85	11	—		Did not advance	
Abrar Osman	5000 metres	13:45.55	21	—		Did not advance	
Abrar Osman	10,000 metres	—				27:43.21	6
Teklemariam Medhin	10,000 metres	—				28:39.26 SB	19
Nguse Tesfaldet	10,000 metres	—				28:14.72	13
Beraki Beyene	Marathon	—				DNF	
Ghirmay Ghebreslassie	Marathon	—				2:12:27	1st place, gold medalist(s)
Amanuel Mesel	Marathon	—				2:15:06	9

=== Women ===
Track and road events

Athlete	Event	Heat		Semifinal		Final	
Athlete	Event	Result	Rank	Result	Rank	Result	Rank
Nazret Weldu	10,000 metres	—				35:14.18 SB	24
Nebiat Habtemariam	Marathon	—				2:44:42 SB	34
