= Finland at the 2015 World Championships in Athletics =

- WA code: FIN
- Website: www.yleisurheilu.fi

in Beijing
- Competitors: 17
- Medals Ranked 32nd: Gold 0 Silver 0 Bronze 1 Total 1

World Championships in Athletics appearances
- 1976; 1980; 1983; 1987; 1991; 1993; 1995; 1997; 1999; 2001; 2003; 2005; 2007; 2009; 2011; 2013; 2015; 2017; 2019; 2022; 2023; 2025

Finland competed at the 2015 World Championships in Athletics in Beijing, China, from 22 to 30 August 2015.

== Medalists ==
The following Finnish competitors won medals at the Championships

Medal	Athlete	Event	Date
Bronze	Tero Pitkämäki	Javelin throw	26 August

== Results ==
(q – qualified, NM – no mark, SB – season best)

=== Men ===
Track and road events

Athlete	Event	Heat		Semifinal		Final	
Athlete	Event	Result	Rank	Result	Rank	Result	Rank
Henri Manninen	Marathon	—N/a				2:30:21 SB	35
Jarkko Kinnunen	50 kilometres walk	—N/a				4:02:07 SB	32
Aku Partanen	50 kilometres walk	—N/a				3:54:28	18
Aleksi Ojala	50 kilometres walk	—N/a				DNF	

Field events

Athlete	Event	Qualification		Final	
Athlete	Event	Distance	Position	Distance	Position
Tuomas Seppänen	Hammer throw	74.74 SB	11 q	73.18	10
David Söderberg	Hammer throw	75.96	6 q	76.92 SB	6
Tero Pitkämäki	Javelin throw	83.43	5 Q	87.64	3rd place, bronze medalist(s)
Antti Ruuskanen	Javelin throw	82.20	9 q	87.12	5
Ari Mannio	Javelin throw	80.19	14	Did not advance	

=== Women ===
Track and road events

Athlete	Event	Heat		Semifinal		Final	
Athlete	Event	Result	Rank	Result	Rank	Result	Rank
Nooralotta Neziri	100 metres hurdles	13.13	6	Did not advance			
Anne-Mari Hyryläinen	Marathon	—N/a				2:41:59	29
Sandra Eriksson	3000 metres steeplechase	9:39.64	8	—N/a		Did not advance	
Camilla Richardsson	3000 metres steeplechase	9:53.13	8	—N/a		Did not advance	

Field events

Athlete	Event	Qualification		Final	
Athlete	Event	Distance	Position	Distance	Position
Kristiina Mäkelä	Triple jump	13.83	13	Did not advance	
Minna Nikkanen	Pole vault	4.55	6 q	4.60 NR	10
Sanna Kämäräinen	Discus throw	56.68	27	Did not advance	
Sanni Utriainen	Javelin throw	55.56	31	Did not advance	

== Sources ==
- Finnish team
