= 2015 Great North Run =

35th Great North Run
- Venue: Newcastle-upon-Tyne, England, United Kingdom
- Date: 13 September 2015

Medalists
gold medal	Mo Farah (59:23); Mary Keitany (1:07:32); David Weir (42:46); Shelly Woods (53:38)

The 35th Great North Run took place on 13 September 2015 in Newcastle-upon-Tyne, England, United Kingdom with the men's and women's elite races and wheelchair races. World 5000 metres and 10,000 metres champion Mo Farah won the men's race for the second year in a row. He became the first British man to defend his title since Mike McLeod won the first two events in 1981 and 1982, and is only the third man to achieve such a feat; Kenyan Benson Masya is the only other male athlete to have defended his title. Kenyan Mary Keitany also won the women's race for a second consecutive year, the first woman to do so since Liz McColgan in 1996.

Briton David Weir won the men's wheelchair race for the sixth time after missing the race in 2014. Shelley Woods also defended her women's wheelchair title, making it her seventh.

The event was marred by the death of a runner, who was identified on 15 September as 58-year-old David Colley from Hull.

== Results ==
=== Elite races ===
Elite Men

Position	Athlete	Nationality	Time
1	Mo Farah	United Kingdom	59:22
2	Stanley Biwott	Kenya	59:24
3	Mike Kigen	Kenya	1:00:10
4	Stephen Mokoka	South Africa	1:00:40
5	Thomas Ayeko	Uganda	1:01:14
6	Bashir Abdi	Belgium	1:02:06
7	Stephen Sambu	Kenya	1:02:22
8	Mark Kiptoo	Kenya	1:02:32
9	Masato Kikuchi	Japan	1:03:13
10	Timothy Toroitich	Uganda	1:03:14
11	Callum Hawkins	United Kingdom	1:03:35
12	Juan Luis Barrios	Mexico	1:04:38
13	Tesfaalem Mehari	Ethiopia	1:05:18
14	Jonny Mellor	United Kingdom	1:05:25
15	Ian Hudspith	United Kingdom	1:06:08
16	Marcel Berni	Switzerland	1:06:29
17	Neil Renault	United Kingdom	1:06:58
18	Carl Smith	United Kingdom	1:07:07
19	Collis Birmingham	Australia	1:07:55
20	Jonny Hay	United Kingdom	1:07:57

Elite Women

Position	Athlete	Nationality	Time
1	Mary Keitany	Kenya	1:07:32
2	Gemma Steel	United Kingdom	1:11:00
3	Jeļena Prokopčuka	Latvia	1:11:52
4	Alyson Dixon	United Kingdom	1:12:07
5	Adriana Nelson	United States	1:12:29
6	Reia Iwade	Japan	1:12:41
7	Sara Hall	United States	1:15:45
8	Dianne Lauder	United Kingdom	1:20:33
9	Tori Green	United Kingdom	1:21:56
10	Diane Moore	United Kingdom	1:22:34
11	Alex Sneddon	United Kingdom	1:23:00
12	Sarah Cumber	United Kingdom	1:23:50
13	Sarah Murphy	United Kingdom	1:24:41
14	Rebekah Gardner	United Kingdom	1:28:13
15	Michelle Avery	United Kingdom	1:34:20

=== Wheelchair races ===
Wheelchair Men

Position	Athlete	Nationality	Time
1	David Weir	United Kingdom	42:46
2	Simon Lawson	United Kingdom	44:44
3	Josh Cassidy	Canada	45:20
4	Kenny van Weeghel	Netherlands	46:30
5	Rafael Botello Jiménez	Spain	46:30
6	Brett Crossley	United Kingdom	49:19
7	Mark Telford	United Kingdom	49:21
8	Will Smith	United Kingdom	50:57
9	Callum Hall	United Kingdom	52:21
10	Matthew Clarke	United Kingdom	54:14
11	Anthony Gott	United Kingdom	55:47
12	Sam Kolek	United Kingdom	55:54
13	Rob Smith	United Kingdom	1:00:48

Wheelchair Women

Position	Athlete	Nationality	Time
1	Shelly Woods	United Kingdom	53:38
2	Amanda McGrory	United States	53:49
3	Margriet van den Broek	Netherlands	53:58
4	Nikki Emerson	United Kingdom	1:06:42
5	Gemma Scott	United Kingdom	1:07:48
6	Martyna Snopek	Poland	1:11:02
7	Jen Warren	United Kingdom	1:30:44
