= Canada at the 2015 World Championships in Athletics =

- WA code: CAN
- National federation: Athletics Canada
- Website: www.athletics.ca

in Beijing
- Competitors: 44
- Medals Ranked 7th: Gold 2 Silver 3 Bronze 3 Total 8

World Championships in Athletics appearances (overview)
- 1976; 1980; 1983; 1987; 1991; 1993; 1995; 1997; 1999; 2001; 2003; 2005; 2007; 2009; 2011; 2013; 2015; 2017; 2019; 2022; 2023; 2025

Canada competed at the 2015 World Championships in Athletics in Beijing, China, from 22–30 August 2015.

== Medallists ==
The following competitors from Canada won medals at the Championships

Medal	Athlete	Event	Date
Gold	Shawnacy Barber	Pole vault	24 August
Gold	Derek Drouin	High jump	30 August
Silver	Brianne Theisen-Eaton	Heptathlon	23 August
Silver	Damian Warner	Decathlon	29 August
Silver	Melissa Bishop	800 metres	29 August
Bronze	Benjamin Thorne	20 kilometres walk	23 August
Bronze	Andre De Grasse	100 metres	23 August
Bronze	Aaron Brown; Andre De Grasse; Brendon Rodney; Justyn Warner	4 × 100 metres relay	29 August

== Results ==
=== Men ===
Track and road events

Athlete	Event	Heat		Semifinal		Final	
Athlete	Event	Result	Rank	Result	Rank	Result	Rank
Andre De Grasse	100 metres	9.99	2 Q	9.96	2 Q	9.92 PB	3rd place, bronze medalist(s)
Justyn Warner	100 metres	10.20	5	did not advance			
Aaron Brown	100 metres	10.03	2 Q	10.15	7	did not advance	
Aaron Brown	200 metres	20.43	4	did not advance			
Brendon Rodney	200 metres	20.18 PB	3 Q	20.46	8	did not advance	
Charles Philibert-Thiboutot	1500 metres	3.39.72	7 q	3.39.62	10	did not advance	
Mohammed Ahmed	5000 metres	13.19.58 SB	3 Q	—N/a		14.00.38	12
Cameron Levins	5000 metres	13.48.72	9	—N/a		did not advance	
Cameron Levins	10,000 metres	—N/a				28.15.19	14
Johnathan Cabral	110 metres hurdles	13.55	4 Q	13.37 PB	4	did not advance	
Sekou Kaba	110 metres hurdles	13.46	4 Q	13.58	7	did not advance	
Alex Genest	3000 metres steeplechase	8:52.49	10	—N/a		did not advance	
Matthew Hughes	3000 metres steeplechase	8.41.52	3 Q	—N/a		8.18.63 SB	8
Taylor Milne	3000 metres steeplechase	8:43.47	8	—N/a		did not advance	
Aaron Brown; Andre De Grasse; Brendon Rodney; Justyn Warner	4 × 100 metres relay	38.03 SB	5 q	—N/a		38.13	3rd place, bronze medalist(s)
Inaki Gomez	20 kilometres walk	—N/a				1.21.55 SB	15
Benjamin Thorne	20 kilometres walk	—N/a				1.19.57 NR	3rd place, bronze medalist(s)
Evan Dunfee	20 kilometres walk	—N/a				1.21.48 SB	13
Evan Dunfee	50 kilometres walk	—N/a				3.49.56 PB	12
Mathieu Bilodeau	50 kilometres walk	—N/a				4.01.35 SB	31

Field events

Athlete	Event	Qualification		Final	
Athlete	Event	Distance	Position	Distance	Position
Derek Drouin	High jump	2.31	1 Q	2.34	1st place, gold medalist(s)
Michael Mason	High jump	2.26	9	did not advance	
Shawnacy Barber	Pole vault	5.70	7 Q	5.90	1st place, gold medalist(s)
Tim Nedow	Shot put	19.63	9	did not advance	

Combined events – Decathlon

Athlete	Event	100 m	LJ	SP	HJ	400 m	110H	DT	PV	JT	1500 m	Final	Rank
Damian Warner	Result	10.31	7.65 PB	14.44 PB	2.04 SB	47.30	13.63	44.99	4.80 PB	63.50 SB	4.31.51	8695 NR	2nd place, silver medalist(s)
Damian Warner	Points	1020	972	755	840	943	1023	767	849	791	735	8695 NR	2nd place, silver medalist(s)

=== Women ===
Track and road events

Athlete	Event	Heat		Semifinal		Final	
Athlete	Event	Result	Rank	Result	Rank	Result	Rank
Crystal Emmanuel	100 metres	11.33	5	did not advance			
Crystal Emmanuel	200 metres	23.22	4	did not advance			
Khamica Bingham	100 metres	11.30	5	did not advance			
Khamica Bingham	200 metres	22.90	3 Q	23.02	6	did not advance	
Kimberly Hyacinthe	100 metres	11.54	6	did not advance			
Kimberly Hyacinthe	200 metres	23.03	3 Q	23.07	7	did not advance	
Audrey Jean-Baptiste	400 metres	53.18	8	did not advance			
Carline Muir	400 metres	51.70 SB	5 q	52.31	8	did not advance	
Fiona Benson	800 metres	2:00.53	2 Q	1.59.59 PB	5	did not advance	
Melissa Bishop	800 metres	2:00.23	1 Q	1.57.52 NR	1 Q	1.58.12	2nd place, silver medalist(s)
Nicole Sifuentes	1500 metres	4:12.82	8	did not advance			
Nicole Sifuentes	5000 metres	15:50.99	11	—N/a		did not advance	
Lanni Marchant	10,000 metres	—N/a				32.22.50	18
Natasha Wodak	10,000 metres	—N/a				32.59.20	23
Phylicia George	100 metres hurdles	13.03	5 q	12.87	5	did not advance	
Nikkita Holder	100 metres hurdles	12.86	2 Q	13.00	6	did not advance	
Sage Watson	400 metres hurdles	56.08	5 q	56.38	7	did not advance	
Geneviève Lalonde	3000 metres steeplechase	9:36.83	6	—N/a		did not advance	
Erin Teschuk	3000 metres steeplechase	9:40.07 PB	10	—N/a		did not advance	
Khamica Bingham; Crystal Emmanuel; Isatu Fofanah; Kimberly Hyacinthe	4 × 100 metres relay	42.60 NR	3 Q	—N/a		43.05	6
Audrey Jean-Baptiste; Carline Muir; Aiyanna Stiverne; Sage Watson; Nicole Sassine*	4 × 400 metres relay	3.26.14 SB	4 Q	—N/a		3.27.69	8
Rachel Seaman	20 kilometres walk	—N/a				1:31.39	13

Field events

Athlete	Event	Qualification		Final	
Athlete	Event	Distance	Position	Distance	Position
Christabel Nettey	Long jump	6.79	4 Q	6.95	4
Sultana Frizell	Hammer throw	69.66	13	did not advance	
Elizabeth Gleadle	Javelin throw	64.02	6 Q	59.82	11

Combined events – Heptathlon

Athlete	Event	100H	HJ	SP	200 m	LJ	JT	800 m	Final	Rank
Brianne Theisen-Eaton	Result	12.98 PB	1.80	13.70	23.94	6.55	42.94	2:11.52	6554	2nd place, silver medalist(s)
Brianne Theisen-Eaton	Points	1127	978	774	986	1023	724	942	6554	2nd place, silver medalist(s)

Key

- Note–Ranks given for track events are within the athlete's heat only
- Q = Qualified for the next round
- q = Qualified for the next round as a fastest loser or, in field events, by position without achieving the qualifying target
- NR = National record
- PB = Personal best
- N/A = Round not applicable for the event
- Bye = Athlete not required to compete in round

== Sources ==
- Provisional Canadian team named July 20
- Athletics Canada official roster for the games.
