= Kenya at the 2015 World Championships in Athletics =

- WA code: KEN
- Website: www.athleticskenya.or.ke

in Beijing
- Competitors: 52
- Medals Ranked 1st: Gold 7 Silver 6 Bronze 3 Total 16

World Championships in Athletics appearances (overview)
- 1983; 1987; 1991; 1993; 1995; 1997; 1999; 2001; 2003; 2005; 2007; 2009; 2011; 2013; 2015; 2017; 2019; 2022; 2023; 2025

Kenya competed at the 2015 World Championships in Athletics in Beijing, China, from 22–30 August 2015. Selection came from the 2015 Athletics Kenya World Championship Trials.

== Medalists ==
The following competitors from Kenya won medals at the Championships

Medal	Athlete	Event	Date
Gold	Vivian Cheruiyot	10,000 metres	24 August
Gold	Ezekiel Kemboi	3000 metres steeplechase	24 August
Gold	Nicholas Bett	400 metres hurdles	25 August
Gold	David Rudisha	800 metres	25 August
Gold	Julius Yego	Javelin throw	26 August
Gold	Hyvin Jepkemoi	3000 metres steeplechase	26 August
Gold	Asbel Kiprop	1500 metres	30 August
Silver	Geoffrey Kamworor	10,000 metres	22 August
Silver	Conseslus Kipruto	3000 metres steeplechase	24 August
Silver	Faith Kipyegon	1500 metres	25 August
Silver	Caleb Mwangangi Ndiku	5000 metres	29 August
Silver	Helah Kiprop	Marathon	30 August
Silver	Elijah Motonei Manangoi	1500 metres	30 August
Bronze	Paul Tanui	10,000 metres	22 August
Bronze	Brimin Kipruto	3000 metres steeplechase	24 August
Bronze	Eunice Jepkoech Sum	800 metres	29 August

== Results ==
(q – qualified, NM – no mark, SB – season best)

=== Men ===
Track and road events

Athlete	Event	Heat		Semifinal		Final	
Athlete	Event	Result	Rank	Result	Rank	Result	Rank
Mike Mokamba Nyang'au	200 metres	20.51	5	Did not advance			
Carvin Nkanata	200 metres	20.43	4	Did not advance			
Alphas Kishoyian	400 metres	46.02	6	Did not advance			
Ferguson Cheruiyot Rotich	800 metres	1:45.83	1 Q	1:44.85	2 Q	1:46.35	4
Alfred Kipketer	800 metres	1:46.67	2 Q	1:44.99	2 Q	1:47.66	8
David Rudisha	800 metres	1:48.31	1 Q	1:47.70	1 Q	1:45.84	1st place, gold medalist(s)
Asbel Kiprop	1500 metres	3:38.97	1 Q	3:43.48	1 Q	3:34.40	1st place, gold medalist(s)
Silas Kiplagat	1500 metres	3:38.13	1 Q	3:43.64	3 Q	3:34.81	5
Elijah Motonei Manangoi	1500 metres	3:42.57	1 Q	3:35.00	1 Q	3:34.63	2nd place, silver medalist(s)
Timothy Cheruiyot	1500 metres	3:38.50	6 Q	3:35.74	5 Q	3:36.05	7
Emmanuel Kipsang	5000 metres	13:46.43	8	—N/a		Did not advance	
Isiah Koech	5000 metres	13:23.51	10 q	—N/a		13:55.98	8
Caleb Mwangangi Ndiku	5000 metres	13:19.58 SB	3 Q	—N/a		13:51.75	2nd place, silver medalist(s)
Edwin Soi	5000 metres	13:45.28	4 Q	—N/a		13:59.02	10
Geoffrey Kipsang	10,000 metres	—N/a				27:01.76	2nd place, silver medalist(s)
Bedan Karoki	10,000 metres	—N/a				27:04.77 SB	4
Paul Tanui	10,000 metres	—N/a				27:02.83	3rd place, bronze medalist(s)
Dennis Kipruto Kimetto	Marathon	—N/a				DNF	
Wilson Kipsang Kiprotich	Marathon	—N/a				DNF	
Mark Korir	Marathon	—N/a				2:21:20	22
Nicholas Bett	400 metres hurdles	48.37	1 Q	48.54	2 Q	47.79 WL, NR	1st place, gold medalist(s)
Haron Koech	400 metres hurdles	49.38 PB	5 q	49.54	7	Did not advance	
Boniface Tumuti	400 metres hurdles	48.49 PB	1 Q	48.29 PB	1 Q	48.33	5
Jairus Kipchoge Birech	3000 metres steeplechase	8:25.77	1 Q	—N/a		8:12.62	4
Ezekiel Kemboi	3000 metres steeplechase	8:24.75	1 Q	—N/a		8:11.28	1st place, gold medalist(s)
Brimin Kipruto	3000 metres steeplechase	8:24.95	3 Q	—N/a		8:12.54	3rd place, bronze medalist(s)
Conseslus Kipruto	3000 metres steeplechase	8:41.41	1 Q	—N/a		8:12.38	2nd place, silver medalist(s)

Field events

Athlete	Event	Qualification		Final	
Athlete	Event	Distance	Position	Distance	Position
Julius Yego	Javelin throw	84.46	3 Q	92.72 WL, AR	1st place, gold medalist(s)

=== Women ===
Track and road events

Athlete	Event	Heat		Semifinal		Final	
Athlete	Event	Result	Rank	Result	Rank	Result	Rank
Maureen Jelagat Maiyo	400 metres	51.40 PB	4 q	51.92	7	Did not advance	
Jacinter Shikanda	400 metres	DQ	–	Did not advance			
Joy Sakari	400 metres	50.71 NR	2 Q	DNS	–	Did not advance	
Janeth Jepkosgei	800 metres	2:01.40	4	Did not advance			
Eunice Jepkoech Sum	800 metres	1:59.67	1 Q	1:57.56	3 q	1:58.18	3rd place, bronze medalist(s)
Margaret Wambui	800 metres	2:03.52	7	Did not advance			
Nancy Chepkwemoi	1500 metres	4:05.65	3 Q	4:18.15	11	Did not advance	
Faith Kipyegon	1500 metres	4:02.77	2 Q	4:06.88	2 Q	4:08.96	2nd place, silver medalist(s)
Viola Cheptoo Lagat	1500 metres	4:12.15	7	Did not advance			
Irene Chepet Cheptai	5000 metres	15:21.03	4 Q	—N/a		15:03.41	7
Mercy Cherono	5000 metres	15:20.94	2 Q	—N/a		15:01.36	5
Viola Kibiwot	5000 metres	15:15.27	3 Q	—N/a		14:46.16	4
Janet Kisa	5000 metres	15:26.49	4 Q	—N/a		15:02.68 SB	6
Vivian Cheruiyot	10,000 metres	—N/a				31:41.31	1st place, gold medalist(s)
Sally Kipyego	10,000 metres	—N/a				31:44.42 SB	5
Betsy Saina	10,000 metres	—N/a				31:51.35 SB	8
Visiline Jepkesho	Marathon	—N/a				2:36:17	20
Edna Kiplagat	Marathon	—N/a				2:28:18	5
Helah Kiprop	Marathon	—N/a				2:27:36	2nd place, silver medalist(s)
Jemima Sumgong	Marathon	—N/a				2:27:42	4
Koki Manunga	400 metres hurdles	58.96	6	Did not advance			
Rosefline Chepngetich	3000 metres steeplechase	9:25.91 PB	3 Q	—N/a		9:46.08	15
Hyvin Jepkemoi	3000 metres steeplechase	9:26.19	1 Q	—N/a		9:19.11	1st place, gold medalist(s)
Virginia Nyambura	3000 metres steeplechase	9:28.50	2 Q	—N/a		9:26.21	7

== Sources ==
- Kenyan team
