= Uganda at the 2015 World Championships in Athletics =

- WA code: UGA

in Beijing, China
- Competitors: 11
- Medals Ranked 32nd: Gold 0 Silver 0 Bronze 1 Total 1

World Championships in Athletics appearances
- 1983; 1987; 1991; 1993; 1995; 1997; 1999; 2001; 2003; 2005; 2007; 2009; 2011; 2013; 2015; 2017; 2019; 2022; 2023; 2025

Uganda competed at the 2015 World Championships in Athletics in Beijing, China, from 22 to 30 August 2015.

On Day 1 (22 August), Solomon Mutai won the bronze medal in the men's marathon.

== Medalists ==
Medal	Athlete	Event	Date
Bronze	Solomon Mutai	Marathon	22 August

== Results ==
(q – qualified, NM – no mark, SB – season best)

=== Men ===
Track and road events

Athlete	Event	Heat		Semifinal		Final	
Athlete	Event	Result	Rank	Result	Rank	Result	Rank
Ronald Musagala	1500 metres	3:42.12	10	Did not advance			
Phillip Kipyeko	5000 metres	13:26.20	12	—N/a		Did not advance	
Moses Kibet	10,000 metres	—N/a				DNF	
Joshua Kiprui Cheptegei	10,000 metres	—N/a				27:48.89	9
Timothy Toroitich	10,000 metres	—N/a				27:44.90	8
Abraham Kiplimo	Marathon	—N/a				DNF	
Jackson Kiprop	Marathon	—N/a				2:15:16	10
Solomon Mutai	Marathon	—N/a				2:13:30	3rd place, bronze medalist(s)
Stephen Kiprotich	Marathon	—N/a				2:14:43	6
Benjamin Kiplagat	3000 metres steeplechase	8:54.46	11	—N/a		Did not advance	

=== Women ===
Track and road events

Athlete	Event	Split Times										Finish		
Athlete	Event	2000 Metres		4000 Metres		5000 Metres		6000 Metres		8000 Metres		Finish		
Athlete	Event	Time	Rank	Time	Rank	Time	Rank	Time	Rank	Time	Rank	Time	Rank	Notes
Juliet Chekwel	10,000 metres	6:29.41	12	12:56.09	10	16:13.10	10	19:23.77	9	25:44.29	9	32:20.95	17	NR
