= Spain at the 2015 World Championships in Athletics =

- WA code: ESP
- National federation: Real Federación Española de Atletismo
- Website: www.rfea.es

in Beijing
- Competitors: 40
- Medals Ranked 15th: Gold 1 Silver 0 Bronze 0 Total 1

World Championships in Athletics appearances (overview)
- 1976; 1980; 1983; 1987; 1991; 1993; 1995; 1997; 1999; 2001; 2003; 2005; 2007; 2009; 2011; 2013; 2015; 2017; 2019; 2022; 2023; 2025

Spain competed at the 2015 World Championships in Athletics in Beijing, China, from 22–30 August 2015.

== Medalists ==
The following competitors from Spain won medals at the Championships

Medal	Athlete	Event	Date
Gold	Miguel Ángel López	20 kilometres walk	23 August

== Results ==
Men
Track & road events

Athlete	Event	Heat		Semifinal		Final	
Athlete	Event	Result	Rank	Result	Rank	Result	Rank
Kevin López	800 metres	1:46.06	3 Q	1:45.84	10	did not advance	
David Bustos	1500 metres	3:38.75	10 Q	3:42.48	12	did not advance	
Víctor Corrales	1500 metres	3:44.76	33	did not advance			
Adel Mechaal	1500 metres	3:46.05	37	did not advance			
Alemayehu Bezabeh	5000 metres	13:54.13	27	—N/a		did not advance	
Jesús España	5000 metres	13:51.47	26	—N/a		did not advance	
Ilias Fifa	5000 metres	13:28.29	13	—N/a		did not advance	
Yidiel Contreras	110 metres hurdles	13.48	19	13.57	21	did not advance	
Roberto Aláiz	3000 metres steeplechase	DNF		—N/a		did not advance	
Fernando Carro	3000 metres steeplechase	8:38.05	14	—N/a		did not advance	
Sebastián Martos	3000 metres steeplechase	8:50.20	26	—N/a		did not advance	
Carles Castillejo	Marathon	—N/a				DNF	
Javier Guerra	Marathon	—N/a				2:17:00	13
Diego García	20 kilometres walk	—N/a				1:24.52	29
Miguel Ángel López	20 kilometres walk	—N/a				1:19:14 PB	1st place, gold medalist(s)
Álvaro Martín	20 kilometres walk	—N/a				1:22.04	16
Francisco Arcilla	50 kilometres walk	—N/a				4:07:23 SB	35
Jesús Ángel García	50 kilometres walk	—N/a				3:46:43 SB	9
Benjamin Sánchez	50 kilometres walk	—N/a				DNF	

Field events

Athlete	Event	Preliminaries		Final	
Athlete	Event	Width Height	Rank	Width Height	Rank
Pablo Torrijos	Triple jump	16.32	20	did not advance	
Adrián Vallés	Pole vault	5.40	31	did not advance	
Borja Vivas	Shot put	19.28	24	did not advance	
Lois Maikel Martínez	Discus throw	58.01	28	did not advance	
Javier Cienfuegos	Hammer throw	70.96	29	did not advance	

Combined events – Decathlon

Athlete	Event	100 m	LJ	SP	HJ	400 m	110H	DT	PV	JT	1500 m	Final	Rank
Pau Tonnesen	Result	11.26 PB	7.21	13.74	2.04	50.24 PB	15.12	45.28	4.80	60.42 PB	5:33.73	7606	18
Pau Tonnesen	Points	804	864	712	840	804	835	773	849	744	381	7606	18
Jorge Ureña	Result	10.99	7.30	12.74	2.01	49.17 PB	14.41	35.20	NM	53.17	4:42.21	6858	21
Jorge Ureña	Points	863	886	651	813	853	922	568	0	636	666	6858	21

Women
Track & road events

Athlete	Event	Heat		Semifinal		Final	
Athlete	Event	Result	Rank	Result	Rank	Result	Rank
Aauri Bokesa	400 metres	52.98	38	did not advance			
Esther Guerrero	800 metres	2:02.64	36	did not advance			
Trihas Gebre	10000 metres	—N/a				32:20.87	16
Caridad Jerez	100 metres hurdles	13.27	29	did not advance			
Alessandra Aguilar	Marathon	—N/a				2:33:42	17
Laura García-Caro	20 kilometres walk	—N/a				1:36:22	32
Raquel González	20 kilometres walk	—N/a				1:32:00	14
María José Poves	20 kilometres walk	—N/a				1:31:06 SB	10

On 22 August 2015 it was reported that Josephine Onyia had tested positive for anabolic steroids at the Spanish athletics championships and that she had been pulled from the World Championships.

Field events

Athlete	Event	Preliminaries		Final	
Athlete	Event	Width Height	Rank	Width Height	Rank
Ruth Beitia	High jump	1.92	1 q	1.99	5
María del Mar Jover	Long jump	NM		did not advance	
Naroa Agirre	Pole vault	4.45	16	did not advance	
Úrsula Ruiz	Shot put	16.36	23	did not advance	
Sabina Asenjo	Discus throw	58.04	24	did not advance	
Laura Redondo	Hammer throw	63.86	29	did not advance	

Key

- Note–Ranks given for track events are within the athlete's heat only
- Q = Qualified for the next round
- q = Qualified for the next round as a fastest loser or, in field events, by position without achieving the qualifying target
- NR = National record
- N/A = Round not applicable for the event
- Bye = Athlete not required to compete in round
