= 2015 World Championships in Athletics – Women's 10,000 metres =

Women's 10,000 metres at the 2015 World Championships
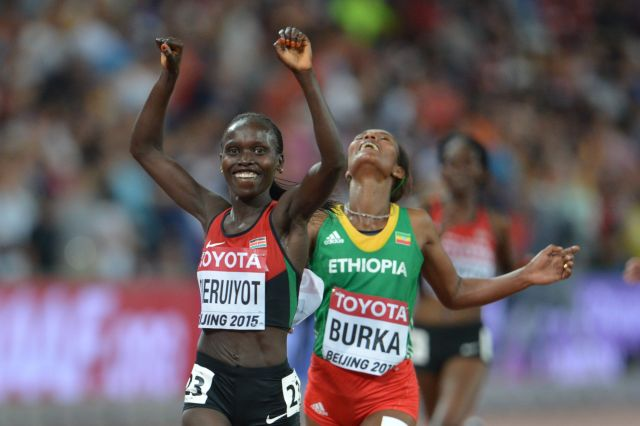
- Victorious Vivian Cheruiyot ahead of Gelete Burka
- Venue: Beijing National Stadium
- Dates: 24 August
- Competitors: 25 from 14 nations
- Winning time: 31:41.31

Medalists
gold medal	Vivian Cheruiyot	Kenya
silver medal	Gelete Burka	Ethiopia
bronze medal	Emily Infeld	United States

The women's 10,000 metres at the 2015 World Championships in Athletics was held at the Beijing National Stadium on 24 August.

== Summary ==
The reigning champion from 2013 Tirunesh Dibaba was absent from the competition, having decided to take a career break to start a family.

Coming into the bell, the lead pack, led by Molly Huddle had dwindled to eight, with Belaynesh Oljira and Susan Kuijken trying to hold on. The field adjusted for the final kick through the turn, Gelete Burka the first to pounce as soon as they reached the back stretch. Betsy Saina fell off the back but the rest stayed in close order drill. It took Vivian Cheruiyot another 50 metres to get pas Huddle then she quickly moved to Burka's shoulder, literally bumping shoulders a couple of times as they entered the turn. Cheruiyot moved past Burka who then followed Cheruiyot through the turn repositioning herself for a final kick coming off the turn. Burka made her move, with 100 meters to go Cheruiyot looked directly into Burka's eyes and the battle was on. For the next 50 meters they raced with Cheruiyot always maintaining the edge. Then it was clear Burka would not get there and the gap opened as Burka struggled. Huddle continued chasing, losing ground to the leaders. Behind her Emily Infeld was sprinting and moved past a celebrating Huddle just one meter before the finish line.

The top 9 runners were from just three countries. Had this been scored by cross country rules, it would be USA 13 (1:35:13.30), Kenya 14 (1:35:17.08), Ethiopia 18 (1:35:24.51). Vivian Cheruiyot returns to top the podium after winning in 2011 and not attempting to defend the title in 2013.

== Records ==
Prior to the competition, the records were as follows:

World record	Junxia Wang (CHN)	29:31.78	Beijing, China	8 September 1993
Championship record	Berhane Adere (ETH)	30:04.18	Paris, France	23 August 2003
World leading	Gelete Burka (ETH)	30:49.68	Hengelo, Netherlands	17 June 2015
African record	Meselech Melkamu (ETH)	29:53.80	Utrecht, Netherlands	14 June 2009
Asian record	Junxia Wang (CHN)	29:31.78	Beijing, China	8 September 1993
NACAC record	Shalane Flanagan (USA)	30:22.22	Beijing, China	15 August 2008
South American record	Carmem de Oliveira (BRA)	31:47.76	Stuttgart, Germany	21 August 1993
European record	~~Elvan Abeylegesse (TUR)~~	~~29:56.34~~	~~Beijing, China~~	~~15 August 2008~~
Oceanian record	Kim Smith (NZL)	30:35.54	Palo Alto, United States	4 May 2008

== Qualification standards ==
Entry standards
32:00.00

== Schedule ==
Date	Time	Round
24 August 2015	20:35	Final

All times are local times (UTC+8)

== Results ==
The race was started at 20:35.

Rank	Name	Nationality	Time	Notes
1st place, gold medalist(s)	Vivian Cheruiyot	Kenya	31:41.31	
2nd place, silver medalist(s)	Gelete Burka	Ethiopia	31:41.77	
3rd place, bronze medalist(s)	Emily Infeld	United States	31:43.49	
4	Molly Huddle	United States	31:43.58	
5	Sally Kipyego	Kenya	31:44.42	SB
6	Shalane Flanagan	United States	31:46.23	
7	Alemitu Heroye	Ethiopia	31:49.73	
8	Betsy Saina	Kenya	31:51.35	SB
9	Belaynesh Oljira	Ethiopia	31:53.01	
10	Susan Kuijken	Netherlands	31:54.32	
11	Jip Vastenburg	Netherlands	32:03.03	
12	Sara Moreira	Portugal	32:06.14	
13	Kasumi Nishihara	Japan	32:12.95	
14	Brenda Flores	Mexico	32:15.26	
15	Kate Avery	Great Britain & N.I.	32:16.19	
16	Trihas Gebre	Spain	32:20.87	
17	Juliet Chekwel	Uganda	32:20.95	NR
18	Lanni Marchant	Canada	32:22.50	
19	Ana Dulce Félix	Portugal	32:26.07	
20	Yuka Takashima	Japan	32:27.79	
21	Almensh Belete	Belgium	32:47.62	SB
22	Rei Ohara	Japan	32:47.74	
23	Natasha Wodak	Canada	32:59.20	
24	Nazret Weldu	Eritrea	35:14.18	SB
	Alia Saeed Mohammed	United Arab Emirates	DNF	
