= Cephas Pasipamiri =

Zimbabwean long-distance runner

Personal information
- Born: 25 September 1975 (age 50)

Sport
- Country: Zimbabwe
- Sport: Track and field
- Event: Marathon

Cephas Pasipamiri (born 25 September 1975) is a Zimbabwean long-distance runner who specialises in the marathon. He competed in the marathon event at the 2015 World Championships in Athletics in Beijing, China.
