= 2015 World Championships in Athletics – Men's 800 metres =

Men's 800 metres at the 2015 World Championships
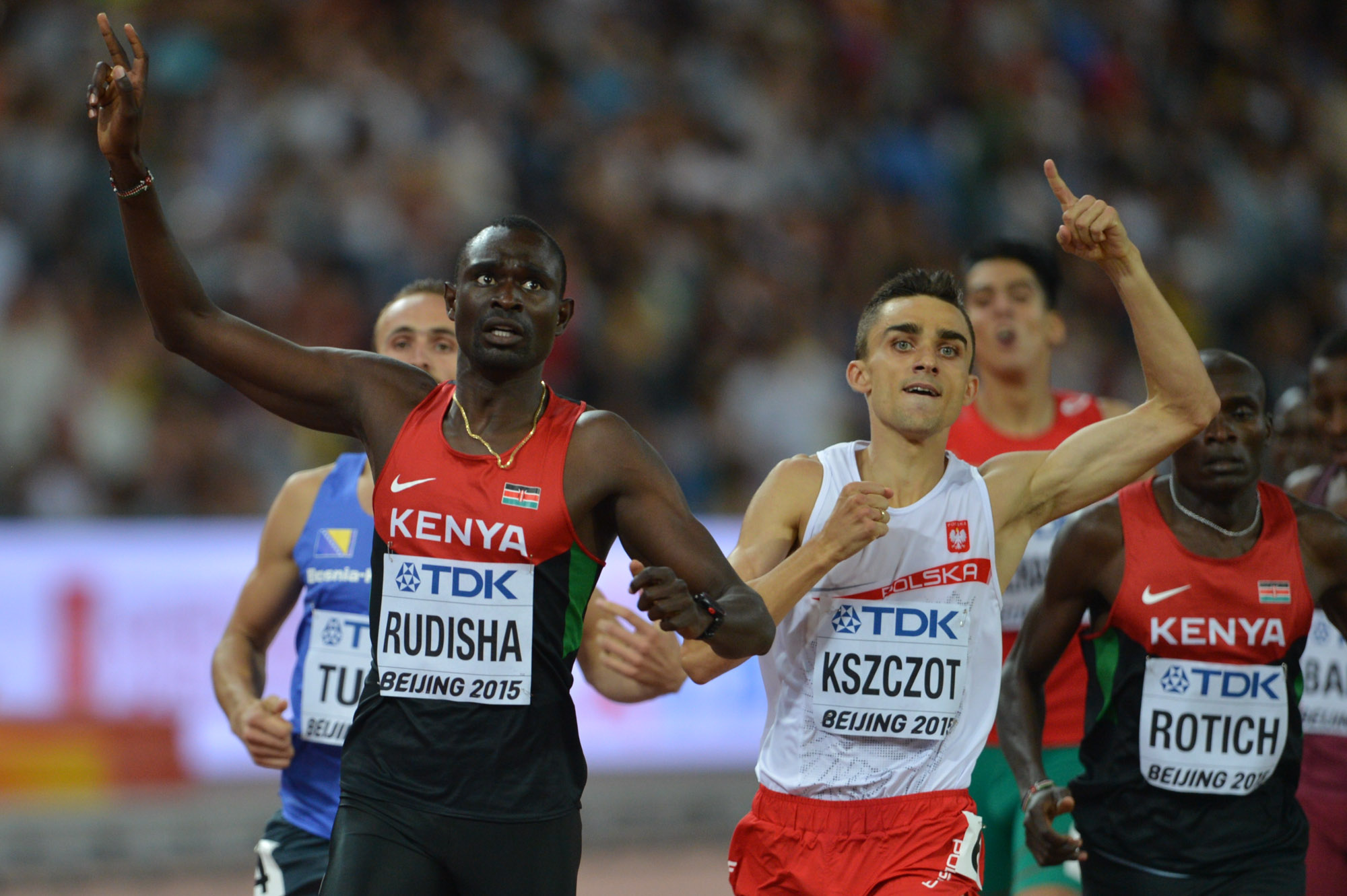
- The final home straight.
- Venue: Beijing National Stadium
- Dates: 22 August (heats); 23 August (semifinals); 25 August (final)
- Competitors: 44 from 32 nations
- Winning time: 1:45.84

Medalists
gold medal	David Rudisha	Kenya
silver medal	Adam Kszczot	Poland
bronze medal	Amel Tuka	Bosnia and Herzegovina

The men's 800 metres at the 2015 World Championships in Athletics was held at the Beijing National Stadium on 22, 23 and 25 August.

Official Video

== Summary ==
There is a definite change in this event. Returning silver medalist Nick Symmonds and returning bronze medalist Ayanleh Souleiman did not enter. Returning champion Mohammed Aman was disqualified for interference in the semi-final round. In fact, of the eight finalists in 2013, only Pierre-Ambroise Bosse returned to the final. Olympic silver medalist, the promising young Nijel Amos got pipped at the line in his slowest heat of the semi-finals and had to watch the final. World record holder David Rudisha did make the final winning that semi, but has not been running the times he ran during his world record years. The only other finalist with Olympic or World Championship 800 finals experience was 2011 sixth placer Adam Kszczot.

In the final, as world record holder, Rudisha commanded all eyeballs. The field expected Rudisha to lead and lead he did, but not to a 50-second first lap, but a very slow 54.15. For point of comparison, 54.15 was exactly the same time Mo Farah ran in the last lap of the 10,000 metres in these championships. With his compatriot Ferguson Cheruiyot Rotich on his shoulder, the two acted as a wall at the front, but nobody else looked like they wanted to pass. 200 more metres went by at the slow pace, finally Kszczot tried to sneak by on the inside, but Rudisha wouldn't let him, accelerating to maintain the lead and continuing to speed up. With world leader and notable kicker Amel Tuka perfectly aligned to pounce, Rudisha just continued to speed up. Only Kszczot was able to follow but the entire field was losing ground. Tuka's speed was not in evidence to the same degree as his previous races this season, instead straining to go around Cheruiyot to get the bronze medal. Tuka's medal was the first for Bosnia and Herzegovina. But it was the old guard 1-2 vs the newcomers.

Rudisha's strategy against these elite athletes was timed at 24.34, an unfamiliar speed. Even when kickers like Tuka, Symmonds. Borzakovskiy, Robinson and Wottle run, they pass slowly. Most of these competitors are the ones slowing to make that final 200 from a kicker look so impressive. Additionally, with the Kenyan's expert team tactics, Cherulyot's position caused everyone except Kszczot to have to run around Cherulyot at speeds they are not used to. Save Tuka's exceptional finishing speed, the strategy would have gotten Cherulyot a bronze medal.

== Records ==
Prior to the competition, the records were as follows:

World record	David Rudisha (KEN)	1:40.91	London, Great Britain	9 August 2012
Championship record	Billy Konchellah (KEN)	1:43.06	Rome, Italy	1 September 1987
World Leading	Amel Tuka (BIH)	1:42.51	Fontvieille, Monaco	17 July 2015
African Record	David Rudisha (KEN)	1:40.91	London, Great Britain	9 August 2012
Asian Record	Yusuf Saad Kamel (BHR)	1:42.79	Fontvieille, Monaco	29 July 2008
North, Central American and Caribbean record	Johnny Gray (USA)	1:42.60	Koblenz, West Germany	28 August 1985
South American Record	Joaquim Cruz (BRA)	1:41.77	Cologne, West Germany	26 August 1984
European Record	Wilson Kipketer (DEN)	1:41.11	Cologne, Germany	24 August 1997
Oceanian record	Peter Snell (NZL)	1:44.3	Christchurch, New Zealand	3 February 1962

== Qualification standards ==
Entry standards
1:46.00

== Schedule ==
Date	Time	Round
22 August 2015	11:50	Heats
23 August 2015	20:15	Semifinals
25 August 2015	20:55	Final

All times are local times (UTC+8)

== Results ==
=== Heats ===
Qualification: Best 3 (Q) and next 6 fastest (q) qualify for the next round.

Rank	Heat	Name	Nationality	Time	Notes
1	4	Ferguson Cheruiyot Rotich	Kenya	1:45.83	Q
2	4	Amine El Manaoui	Morocco	1:45.86	Q
3	4	Kevin López	Spain	1:46.06	Q
4	4	Konstantin Tolokonnikov	Russia	1:46.07	q
5	3	Amel Tuka	Bosnia and Herzegovina	1:46.12	Q
6	3	Nader Belhanbel	Morocco	1:46.23	Q
7	4	Marcin Lewandowski	Poland	1:46.25	q
8	3	Rafith Rodríguez	Colombia	1:46.39	Q
9	5	Adam Kszczot	Poland	1:46.62	Q
10	3	Erik Sowinski	United States	1:46.63	q
11	5	Alfred Kipketer	Kenya	1:46.67	Q
12	3	Mark English	Ireland	1:46.69	q
13	4	Thijmen Kupers	Netherlands	1:46.70	q
14	5	Jeffrey Riseley	Australia	1:46.79	Q
15	5	Jena Umar	Ethiopia	1:47.03	q
16	1	Nijel Amos	Botswana	1:47.23	Q
17	3	Žan Rudolf	Slovenia	1:47.24	
18	1	Antoine Gakeme	Burundi	1:47.47	Q
19	5	Abdelati El Guesse	Morocco	1:47.49	
20	1	Ali Al-Deraan	Saudi Arabia	1:47.65	Q
21	4	Musa Hajdari	Kosovo	1:47.70	NR (Note: By IAAF official website. Kosovo Athletic Federation mentioned result from 2014 (1:47.40), before a recognition by IAAF)
22	2	Mohammed Aman	Ethiopia	1:47.87	Q
23	2	Pierre-Ambroise Bosse	France	1:47.89	Q
24	1	Robin Schembera	Germany	1:48.04	
25	5	Andreas Almgren	Sweden	1:48.06	
26	2	Clayton Murphy	United States	1:48.08	Q
27	2	Giordano Benedetti	Italy	1:48.15	
28	2	Jozef Repčík	Slovakia	1:48.26	
29	6	David Rudisha	Kenya	1:48.31	Q
30	6	Abraham Rotich	Bahrain	1:48.42	Q
31	4	Brice Etès	Monaco	1:48.52	
32	6	Musaeb Abdulrahman Balla	Qatar	1:48.59	Q
33	5	Reinhardt van Rensburg	South Africa	1:48.61	
34	6	Michael Rimmer	Great Britain & N.I.	1:48.70	
35	1	Josh Ralph	Australia	1:48.90	
36	6	Andreas Bube	Denmark	1:48.94	
37	2	Jamal Hairane	Qatar	1:48.96	
38	1	Casimir Loxsom	United States	1:48.97	
39	6	Artur Kuciapski	Poland	1:49.22	
40	1	Khalid Benmahdi	Algeria	1:49.61	
41	2	Kyle Langford	Great Britain & N.I.	1:49.78	
42	6	Cleiton Abrão	Brazil	1:49.79	
43	2	Adnan Taess	Iraq	1:54.44	SB
44	6	Wais Ibrahim Khairandesh	Afghanistan	1:59.51	
	3	Alex Amankwah	Ghana	DNS	

=== Semifinals ===
Qualification: First 2 in each heat (Q) and the next 2 fastest (q) advanced to the final.

Rank	Heat	Name	Nationality	Time	Notes
1	3	Amel Tuka	Bosnia and Herzegovina	1.44.84	Q
2	3	Ferguson Cheruiyot Rotich	Kenya	1:44.85	Q
3	1	Adam Kszczot	Poland	1:44.97	Q
4	1	Alfred Kipketer	Kenya	1:44.99	Q
5	1	Pierre-Ambroise Bosse	France	1:45.02	q
6	3	Nader Belhanbel	Morocco	1:45.28	q
7	3	Marcin Lewandowski	Poland	1:45.34	
8	3	Mark English	Ireland	1:45.55	
9	3	Rafith Rodríguez	Colombia	1:45.63	
10	1	Kevin López	Spain	1:45.84	
11	1	Amine El Manaoui	Morocco	1:46.09	
12	1	Clayton Murphy	United States	1:46.28	
13	3	Erik Sowinski	United States	1:47.16	
14	2	David Rudisha	Kenya	1:47.70	Q
15	1	Thijmen Kupers	Netherlands	1:47.74	
16	2	Musaeb Abdulrahman Balla	Qatar	1:47.93	Q
17	2	Nijel Amos	Botswana	1:47.96	
18	2	Konstantin Tolokonnikov	Russia	1:48.32	
19	2	Abraham Rotich	Bahrain	1:48.61	
20	3	Jena Umar	Ethiopia	1:48.68	
21	2	Ali Al-Deraan	Saudi Arabia	1:48.71	
22	2	Antoine Gakeme	Burundi	1:48.86	
	1	Mohammed Aman	Ethiopia	DQ	R163.2
	2	Jeffrey Riseley	Australia	DNS	

=== Final ===
The final was started at 20:55.

Rank	Name	Nationality	Time	Notes
1st place, gold medalist(s)	David Rudisha	Kenya	1:45.84	
2nd place, silver medalist(s)	Adam Kszczot	Poland	1:46.08	
3rd place, bronze medalist(s)	Amel Tuka	Bosnia and Herzegovina	1:46.30	
4	Ferguson Cheruiyot Rotich	Kenya	1:46.35	
5	Pierre-Ambroise Bosse	France	1:46.63	
6	Musaeb Abdulrahman Balla	Qatar	1:47.01	
7	Nader Belhanbel	Morocco	1:47.09	
8	Alfred Kipketer	Kenya	1:47.66	
