= Germany at the 2015 World Championships in Athletics =

- WA code: GER
- National federation: Deutscher Leichtathletik-Verband
- Website: www.leichtathletik.de

in Beijing
- Competitors: 62
- Medals Ranked 7th: Gold 2 Silver 3 Bronze 3 Total 8

World Championships in Athletics appearances (overview)
- 1991; 1993; 1995; 1997; 1999; 2001; 2003; 2005; 2007; 2009; 2011; 2013; 2015; 2017; 2019; 2022; 2023; 2025

Germany competed at the 2015 World Championships in Athletics in Beijing, China, from 22–30 August 2015.

== Medalists ==
Medal	Athlete	Event	Date
Gold	Christina Schwanitz	Shot put	22 August
Gold	Katharina Molitor	Javelin throw	30 August
Silver	David Storl	Shot put	23 August
Silver	Raphael Holzdeppe	Pole vault	24 August
Silver	Cindy Roleder	100 metres hurdles	28 August
Bronze	Nadine Müller	Discus throw	25 August
Bronze	Gesa Felicitas Krause	3000 metres steeplechase	26 August
Bronze	Rico Freimuth	Decathlon	29 August

== Results ==
=== Men ===
Track and road events

Athlete	Event	Heat		Semifinal		Final	
Athlete	Event	Result	Rank	Result	Rank	Result	Rank
Sven Knipphals	100 metres	10.31	37	did not advance			
Julian Reus	100 metres	10.14	24 Q	10.28	24	did not advance	
Julian Reus	200 metres	20.51	31	did not advance			
Robin Erewa	200 metres	20.67	38	did not advance			
Robin Schembera	800 metres	1:48.04	24	did not advance			
Richard Ringer	5000 metres	13:19.84	7 q	—N/a		14:03.72	14
Arne Gabius	10,000 metres	—N/a				28:24.47	17
Gregor Traber	110 metres hurdles	13.44	15 Q	13.37	12	did not advance	
Matthias Bühler	110 metres hurdles	13.35 SB	7 Q	13.34 PB	11	did not advance	
Alexander John	110 metres hurdles	Disqualified		did not advance			
Julian Reus; Sven Knipphals; Alexander Kosenkow; Aleixo-Platini Menga	4 × 100 metres relay	38.57	9 Q	—N/a		38.15 SB	5
Christopher Linke	20 kilometres walk	—N/a				1:26:10	38
Nils Brembach	20 kilometres walk	—N/a				1:25:21	34
Hagen Pohle	20 kilometres walk	—N/a				1:22:29	18
Carl Dohmann	50 kilometres walk	—N/a				did not finish	

Field events

Athlete	Event	Qualification		Final	
Athlete	Event	Distance	Position	Distance	Position
Eike Onnen	High jump	2.31	6 Q	2.25	12
Mateusz Przybylko	High jump	2.22	28	did not advance	
Raphael Holzdeppe	Pole vault	5.70	15 Q	5.90	2nd place, silver medalist(s)
Tobias Scherbarth	Pole vault	5.70 SB	7 Q	5.65	7
Carlo Paech	Pole vault	5.65	17	did not advance	
Fabian Heinle	Long jump	7.96	14	did not advance	
Alyn Camara	Long jump	7.66	24	did not advance	
David Storl	Shot put	21.26	2 Q	21.74	2nd place, silver medalist(s)
Christoph Harting	Discus throw	64.23	6 q	63.94	8
Daniel Jasinski	Discus throw	61.70	15	did not advance	
Martin Wierig	Discus throw	61.35	19	did not advance	
Thomas Röhler	Javelin throw	83.23	7 Q	87.41	4
Johannes Vetter	Javelin throw	80.86	12 q	83.79	7
Andreas Hofmann	Javelin throw	86.14 PB	1 Q	86.01	6
Lars Hamann	Javelin throw	79.56	16	did not advance	

Combined events – Decathlon

Athlete	Event	100 m	LJ	SP	HJ	400 m	110H	DT	PV	JT	1500 m	Final	Rank
Kai Kazmirek	Result	10.90	7.40	14.27 SB	2.10 SB	46.83 SB	14.39	40.08	5.20 PB	62.55	4:35.61	8448	6
Kai Kazmirek	Points	893	910	745	896	967	935	666	972	776	708	8448	6
Michael Schrader	Result	10.78	7.71	14.32	1.95 SB	47.12 PB	14.19	44.58	4.60	62.09 SB	4:22.30 SB	8418	7
Michael Schrader	Points	910	987	748	758	952	950	758	790	769	796	8418	7
Rico Freimuth	Result	10.51 SB	7.51	15.50	1.95 SB	47.82 SB	13.91 SB	50.17	4.80 SB	60.61	4:37.05 SB	8561 PB	3rd place, bronze medalist(s)
Rico Freimuth	Points	973	937	820	758	918	986	874	849	747	699	8561 PB	3rd place, bronze medalist(s)

=== Women ===
Track and road events

Athlete	Event	Heat		Semifinal		Final	
Athlete	Event	Result	Rank	Result	Rank	Result	Rank
Verena Sailer	100 metres	11.41	30	did not advance			
Rebekka Haase	100 metres	11.29w	23	did not advance			
Gina Lückenkemper	100 metres	11.34	28	did not advance			
Fabienne Kohlmann	800 metres	2:01.42	22 Q	1:59.42	15	did not advance	
Christina Hering	800 metres	2:00.36	11 q	2:00.81	23	did not advance	
Cindy Roleder	100 metres hurdles	12.86 SB	6 Q	12.79 PB	6 Q	12.59 PB	2nd place, silver medalist(s)
Gesa Felicitas Krause	3000 metres steeplechase	9:24.92	2 Q	—N/a		9:19.25 PB	3rd place, bronze medalist(s)
Verena Sailer; Rebekka Haase; Gina Lückenkemper; Alexandra Burghardt	4 × 100 metres relay	42.64 SB	7 q	—N/a		42.64 SB	5

Field events

Athlete	Event	Qualification		Final	
Athlete	Event	Distance	Position	Distance	Position
Marie-Laurence Jungfleisch	High jump	1.92	1 q	1.99 PB	6
Silke Spiegelburg	Pole vault	4.45	17	did not advance	
Lisa Ryzih	Pole vault	4.55	6 q	4.60	12
Martina Strutz	Pole vault	4.55	1 q	4.60	8
Lena Malkus	Long jump	6.46	22	did not advance	
Sosthene Moguenara	Long jump	6.23	27	did not advance	
Malaika Mihambo	Long jump	6.84 SB	3 Q	6.79	6
Kristin Gierisch	Triple jump	13.95	11 q	14.25	8
Christina Schwanitz	Shot put	19.39	1 Q	20.37	1st place, gold medalist(s)
Julia Fischer	Discus throw	63.38	4 Q	63.88	5
Nadine Müller	Discus throw	64.39	3 Q	65.53	3rd place, bronze medalist(s)
Shanice Craft	Discus throw	62.73	6 q	63.10	7
Betty Heidler	Hammer throw	70.60	9 q	72.56	7
Kathrin Klaas	Hammer throw	71.41	7 q	73.18 SB	6
Christina Obergföll	Javelin throw	64.10	5 Q	64.61 SB	4
Katharina Molitor	Javelin throw	63.23	9 q	67.69 WL	1st place, gold medalist(s)
Linda Stahl	Javelin throw	63.52	8 Q	59.88	10
Christin Hussong	Javelin throw	65.92 PB	1 Q	62.98	6

Combined events – Heptathlon

Athlete	Event	100H	HJ	SP	200 m	LJ	JT	800 m	Final	Rank
Carolin Schäfer	Result	13.40 SB	1.80	13.31	24.22	NM	45.21	did not start	did not finish	
Carolin Schäfer	Points	1065	978	748	960	0	768	did not start	did not finish	
Claudia Rath	Result	13.44 PB	1.80 SB	13.09	24.15	6.61	41.31	2:09.67	6441	5
Claudia Rath	Points	1059	978	733	966	1043	692	970	6441	5
Jennifer Oeser	Result	13.67 SB	1.83	13.81	25.04	6.17	46.45 SB	2:13.89 SB	6308 SB	10
Jennifer Oeser	Points	1026	1016	781	884	902	791	908	6308 SB	10
