= 2015 World Championships in Athletics – Women's 800 metres =

Women's 800 metres at the 2015 World Championships
- Venue: Beijing National Stadium
- Dates: 26 August (heats); 27 August (semifinals); 29 August (final)
- Competitors: 44 from 31 nations
- Winning time: 1:58.03

Medalists
gold medal	Maryna Arzamasava	Belarus
silver medal	Melissa Bishop	Canada
bronze medal	Eunice Jepkoech Sum	Kenya

The women's 800 metres at the 2015 World Championships in Athletics was held at the Beijing National Stadium on 26, 27 and 29 August.

== Summary ==
Eunice Jepkoech Sum of Kenya entered the competition as the defending champion and also as the world-leading athlete for the season with her time of 1:56.99 minutes.

The third semi-final was the fastest, with Melissa Bishop battling Maryna Arzamasava to the line, leaving defending champion and world #1 Eunice Jepkoech Sum as a time qualifier. Bishop's winning 1:57.52 became the new Canadian National Record.

In the final it was the same three players, Arzamasava holding the lead through the final turn, with Sum looking for a way to run around her. With Sum moving to the outside, Arzamasava drifted out, opening a gap on the inside which Bishop moved in to occupy. It was three abreast down the home stretch but Arzamasava never relinquished the lead, Bishop unable to get ahead on the inside and Sum just slightly behind them both.

== Records ==
Prior to the competition, the records were as follows:

World record	Jarmila Kratochvílová (TCH)	1:53.28	Munich, West Germany	26 July 1983
Championship record	Jarmila Kratochvílová (TCH)	1:54.68	Helsinki, Finland	9 August 1983
World leading	Eunice Jepkoech Sum (KEN)	1:56.99	Paris, France	4 July 2015
African record	Pamela Jelimo (KEN)	1:54.01	Zürich, Switzerland	29 August 2008
Asian record	Liu Dong (CHN)	1:55.54	Beijing, China	9 September 1993
NACAC record	Ana Fidelia Quirot (CUB)	1:54.44	Barcelona, Spain	9 September 1989
South American record	Letitia Vriesde (SUR)	1:56.68	Gothenburg, Sweden	13 August 1995
European record	Jarmila Kratochvílová (TCH)	1:53.28	Munich, West Germany	26 July 1983
Oceanian record	Toni Hodgkinson (NZL)	1:58.25	Atlanta, United States	27 July 1996

== Qualification standards ==
Entry standards
2:01.00

== Schedule ==
Date	Time	Round
26 August 2015	10:25	Heats
27 August 2015	20:05	Semifinals
29 August 2015	19:15	Final

All times are local times (UTC+8)

== Results ==
=== Heats ===
Qualification: First 3 in each heat (Q) and the next 6 fastest (q) advanced to the semifinals.

Rank	Heat	Name	Nationality	Time	Notes
1	1	Maryna Arzamasava	Belarus	1:58.69	Q, SB
2	1	Lynsey Sharp	Great Britain & N.I.	1:58.98	Q, SB
3	1	Caster Semenya	South Africa	1:59.59	Q, SB
4	1	Nataliia Lupu	Ukraine	1:59.62	q, SB
5	2	Eunice Jepkoech Sum	Kenya	1:59.67	Q
6	2	Olha Lyakhova	Ukraine	1:59.92	Q, PB
7	2	Sifan Hassan	Netherlands	1:59.94	Q
8	2	Rénelle Lamote	France	2:00.20	q
9	6	Melissa Bishop	Canada	2:00.23	Q
10	6	Selina Büchel	Switzerland	2:00.25	Q
11	1	Christina Hering	Germany	2:00.36	q
12	3	Rababe Arafi	Morocco	2:00.37	Q, PB
12	6	Malika Akkaoui	Morocco	2:00.37	Q, SB
14	3	Fiona Benson	Canada	2:00.53	Q
15	3	Brenda Martinez	United States	2:00.54	Q
16	3	Angie Petty	New Zealand	2:00.62	q
17	6	Jennifer Meadows	Great Britain & N.I.	2:00.70	q
17	1	Molly Beckwith-Ludlow	United States	2:00.70	q
19	1	Tintu Lukka	India	2:00.95	SB
20	6	Aníta Hinriksdóttir	Iceland	2:01.01	SB
21	6	Anastasiya Tkachuk	Ukraine	2:01.07	
22	4	Sofia Ennaoui	Poland	2:01.16	Q
23	4	Rose Mary Almanza	Cuba	2:01.33	Q
24	4	Lucia Klocová	Slovakia	2:01.35	Q
25	2	Charline Mathias	Luxembourg	2:01.36	
26	4	Janeth Jepkosgei	Kenya	2:01.40	
27	5	Fabienne Kohlmann	Germany	2:01.42	Q
28	4	Simoya Campbell	Jamaica	2:01.43	
29	3	Yevgeniya Subbotina	Russia	2:01.50	
30	5	Joanna Jóźwik	Poland	2:01.62	Q
31	5	Shelayna Oskan-Clarke	Great Britain & N.I.	2:01.72	Q
32	2	Flávia de Lima	Brazil	2:01.76	
33	5	Natoya Goule	Jamaica	2:02.37	
34	5	Déborah Rodríguez	Uruguay	2:02.46	
35	5	Noélie Yarigo	Benin	2:02.48	
36	4	Esther Guerrero	Spain	2:02.64	
37	3	Zhao Jing	China	2:03.08	SB
38	2	Habitam Alemu	Ethiopia	2:03.19	
39	6	Margaret Wambui	Kenya	2:03.52	
40	4	Ciara Everard	Ireland	2:03.98	
41	5	Alysia Montaño	United States	2:09.57	
42	3	Donna Koniel	Papua New Guinea	2:12.51	
43	5	Andrea Foster	Guyana	2:17.39	
44	1	Aye Aye Aung	Myanmar	2:37.51	
	3	Amela Terzić	Serbia	DNS	

=== Semifinals ===
Qualification: First 2 in each heat (Q) and the next 2 fastest (q) advanced to the final.

Rank	Heat	Name	Nationality	Time	Notes
1	3	Melissa Bishop	Canada	1:57.52	Q, NR
2	3	Maryna Arzamasava	Belarus	1:57.54	Q, PB
3	3	Eunice Jepkoech Sum	Kenya	1:57.56	q
4	3	Joanna Jóźwik	Poland	1:58.35	q, PB
5	3	Sifan Hassan	Netherlands	1:58.50	PB
6	1	Rababe Arafi	Morocco	1:58.55	Q, PB
7	1	Nataliia Lupu	Ukraine	1:58.57	Q, SB
8	1	Selina Büchel	Switzerland	1:58.63	
9	2	Shelayna Oskan-Clarke	Great Britain & N.I.	1:58.86	Q, PB
9	2	Rénelle Lamote	France	1:58.86	Q, PB
11	2	Olha Lyakhova	Ukraine	1:58.94	PB
12	3	Malika Akkaoui	Morocco	1:59.03	SB
13	3	Lucia Klocová	Slovakia	1:59.14	SB
14	3	Lynsey Sharp	Great Britain & N.I.	1:59.33	
15	1	Fabienne Kohlmann	Germany	1:59.42	
16	2	Angie Petty	New Zealand	1:59.53	
17	2	Fiona Benson	Canada	1:59.59	PB
18	1	Sofia Ennaoui	Poland	2:00.11	PB
19	1	Brenda Martinez	United States	2:00.27	
20	2	Rose Mary Almanza	Cuba	2:00.38	
21	2	Molly Beckwith-Ludlow	United States	2:00.43	
22	1	Jennifer Meadows	Great Britain & N.I.	2:00.53	
23	2	Christina Hering	Germany	2:00.81	
24	1	Caster Semenya	South Africa	2:03.18	

=== Final ===
The final was started at 14:15

Rank	Name	Nationality	Time	Notes
1st place, gold medalist(s)	Maryna Arzamasava	Belarus	1:58.03	
2nd place, silver medalist(s)	Melissa Bishop	Canada	1:58.12	
3rd place, bronze medalist(s)	Eunice Jepkoech Sum	Kenya	1:58.18	
4	Rababe Arafi	Morocco	1:58.90	
5	Shelayna Oskan-Clarke	Great Britain & N.I.	1:58.99	
6	Nataliia Lupu	Ukraine	1:58.99	
7	Joanna Jóźwik	Poland	1:59.09	
8	Rénelle Lamote	France	1:59.70	
