= 2015 World Championships in Athletics – Men's 50 kilometres walk =

Men's 50 kilometres walk at the 2015 World Championships
- Venue: Beijing National Stadium
- Dates: 29 August
- Competitors: 53 from 29 nations
- Winning time: 3:40:32

Medalists
gold medal	Matej Tóth	Slovakia
silver medal	Jared Tallent	Australia
bronze medal	Takayuki Tanii	Japan

The men's 50 kilometres walk at the 2015 World Championships in Athletics was held at the Beijing National Stadium on 29 August.

== Records ==
Prior to the competition, the records were as follows:

World record	Yohann Diniz (FRA)	3:32:33	Zürich, Switzerland	15 August 2014
Championship record	Robert Korzeniowski (POL)	3:36:03	Saint-Denis, France	23 August 2003
World Leading	Matej Tóth (SVK)	3:34:38	Dudince, Slovakia	21 March 2015
African Record	Marc Mundell (RSA)	3:55:32	London, Great Britain	11 August 2012
Asian Record	Yu Chaohong (CHN)	3:36:06	Nanjing, China	22 October 2005
North, Central American and Caribbean record	Erick Barrondo (GUA)	3:41:09	Dudince, Slovakia	23 March 2013
South American Record	James Rendón (COL)	3:47:41	Valley Cottage, United States	14 September 2014
European Record	Yohann Diniz (FRA)	3:32:33	Zürich, Switzerland	15 August 2014
Oceanian record	Nathan Deakes (AUS)	3:35:47	Geelong, Australia	2 December 2006
The following records were established during the competition:
South American Record	Andrés Chocho (ECU)	3:46:00	Beijing, China	29 August 2015

== Qualification standards ==
Time
4:06:00

== Schedule ==
Date	Time	Round
29 August 2015	07:30	Final

All times are local times (UTC+8)

== Results ==
The race was started at 07:30.

KEY:	NR	National record	PB	Personal best	SB	Seasonal best

Rank	Name	Nationality	Time	Notes
1st place, gold medalist(s)	Matej Tóth	Slovakia	3:40:32	
2nd place, silver medalist(s)	Jared Tallent	Australia	3:42:17	SB
3rd place, bronze medalist(s)	Takayuki Tanii	Japan	3:42:55	
4	Hirooki Arai	Japan	3:43:44	
5	Robert Heffernan	Ireland	3:44:17	SB
6	Zhang Lin	China	3:44:39	PB
7	Yu Wei	China	3:45:21	PB
8	Andrés Chocho	Ecuador	3:46:00	AR
9	Jesús Ángel García	Spain	3:46:43	SB
10	Quentin Rew	New Zealand	3:48:48	PB
11	Adrian Błocki	Poland	3:49:11	PB
12	Evan Dunfee	Canada	3:49:56	PB
13	Chris Erickson	Australia	3:51:26	SB
14	Wu Qianlong	China	3:51:35	
15	Ivan Banzeruk	Ukraine	3:52:15	
16	Marco De Luca	Italy	3:53:02	
17	Matteo Giupponi	Italy	3:53:23	
18	Aku Partanen	Finland	3:54:28	
19	Serhiy Budza	Ukraine	3:55:10	
20	Luis Fernando López	Colombia	3:55:43	PB
21	Pedro Isidro	Portugal	3:55:44	PB
22	Tadas Šuškevičius	Lithuania	3:56:27	SB
23	Park Chil-sung	South Korea	3:56:42	SB
24	Håvard Haukenes	Norway	3:56:50	SB
25	Teodorico Caporaso	Italy	3:56:58	
26	Sandeep Kumar	India	3:57:03	SB
27	Manish Singh	India	3:57:11	PB
28	Rafał Augustyn	Poland	3:57:30	
29	Jaime Quiyuch	Guatemala	3:57:41	SB
30	Dušan Majdán	Slovakia	3:58:57	SB
31	Mathieu Bilodeau	Canada	4:01:35	SB
32	Jarkko Kinnunen	Finland	4:02:07	SB
33	Marc Mundell	South Africa	4:02:41	
34	Yuki Yamazaki	Japan	4:03:54	
35	Francisco Arcilla	Spain	4:07:23	SB
36	Luis Ángel Sánchez	Guatemala	4:09:26	
37	John Nunn	United States	4:09:44	SB
38	Arnis Rumbenieks	Latvia	4:28:55	
	Marius Cocioran	Romania	DNF	
	Carl Dohmann	Germany	DNF	
	Mário dos Santos	Brazil	DNF	
	Anders Hansson	Sweden	DNF	
	Anatole Ibáñez	Sweden	DNF	
	Aleksi Ojala	Finland	DNF	
	Alexandros Papamichail	Greece	DNF	
	Benjamin Sánchez	Spain	DNF	
	Alex Wright	Ireland	DNF	
	Erick Barrondo	Guatemala	DQ	
	Brendan Boyce	Ireland	DQ	
	Lukáš Gdula	Czech Republic	DQ	
	Ihor Hlavan	Ukraine	DQ	
	Łukasz Nowak	Poland	DQ	
	Martin Tišťan	Slovakia	DQ	
	Aleksandr Yargunkin	Russia	DNS	
