= Japan at the 2015 World Championships in Athletics =

- WA code: JPN
- National federation: Japan Association of Athletics Federations
- Website: www.jaaf.or.jp/english/

in Beijing
- Competitors: 51
- Medals Ranked 32nd: Gold 0 Silver 0 Bronze 1 Total 1

World Championships in Athletics appearances
- 1983; 1987; 1991; 1993; 1995; 1997; 1999; 2001; 2003; 2005; 2007; 2009; 2011; 2013; 2015; 2017; 2019; 2022; 2023; 2025

Japan competed at the 2015 World Championships in Athletics in Beijing, China, from 22–30 August 2015.

== Medalists ==
The following Japanese competitors won medals at the Championships

Medal	Athlete	Event	Date
Bronze	Takayuki Tanii	50 kilometres walk	29 August

== Results ==
(q – qualified, NM – no mark, SB – season best)

=== Men ===
Track and road events

Athlete	Event	Heat		Semifinal		Final	
Athlete	Event	Result	Rank	Result	Rank	Result	Rank
Kei Takase	100 metres	10.15	4	Did not advance			
Kei Takase	200 metres	20.33	4 q	20.64	8	Did not advance	
Kenji Fujimitsu	200 metres	20.28	2 Q	20.34	7	Did not advance	
Abdul Hakim Sani Brown	200 metres	20.35	2 Q	20.47	5	Did not advance	
Yuzo Kanemaru	400 metres	45.65	6	Did not advance			
Kota Murayama	5000 metres	14:07.11	17	—N/a		Did not advance	
Suguru Osako	5000 metres	13:45.82	7	—N/a		Did not advance	
Kenta Murayama	10,000 metres	—N/a				29:50.22	22
Yuta Shitara	10,000 metres	—N/a				30:08.35	23
Tetsuya Yoroizaka	10,000 metres	—N/a				28:25.77	18
Masakazu Fujiwara	Marathon	—N/a				2:21:06 SB	21
Kazuhiro Maeda	Marathon	—N/a				2:32:49	40
Takayuki Kishimoto	400 metres hurdles	49.78	8	Did not advance			
Yuta Konishi	400 metres hurdles	49.58 SB	6	Did not advance			
Yuki Matsushita	400 metres hurdles	49.34	4 Q	51.10	8	Did not advance	
Kazuma Ōseto; Kenji Fujimitsu; Takuya Nagata; Kotaro Taniguchi	4 × 100 metres relay	38.60	4	—N/a		Did not advance	
Tomoya Tamura; Yuzo Kanemaru; Naoki Kobayashi; Takamasa Kitagawa	4 × 400 metres relay	3:02.97 SB	7	—N/a		Did not advance	
Isamu Fujisawa	20 kilometres walk	—N/a				1:21:51	13
Yusuke Suzuki	20 kilometres walk	—N/a				DNF	
Eiki Takahashi	20 kilometres walk	—N/a				1:28:30	47
Hirooki Arai	50 kilometres walk	—N/a				3:43:44	4
Takayuki Tanii	50 kilometres walk	—N/a				3:42:55	3rd place, bronze medalist(s)
Yuki Yamazaki	50 kilometres walk	—N/a				4:03:54	34

Field events

Athlete	Event	Qualification		Final	
Athlete	Event	Distance	Position	Distance	Position
Takashi Eto	High jump	2.22	28	Did not advance	
Yuji Hiramatsu	High jump	2.17	35	Did not advance	
Naoto Tobe	High jump	2.26	25	Did not advance	
Hiroki Ogita	Pole vault	5.65 SB	20	Did not advance	
Seito Yamamoto	Pole vault	5.65 SB	23	Did not advance	
Yohei Sugai	Long jump	7.92	16	Did not advance	
Ryohei Arai	Javelin throw	84.66 SB	2 Q	83.07	9

Combined events – Decathlon

Athlete	Event	100 m	LJ	SP	HJ	400 m	110H	DT	PV	JT	1500 m	Final	Rank
Akihiko Nakamura	Result	10.86	7.26	11.67	1.95	47.81	14.72	33.48	4.70	53.57 PB	4:16.36	7745	16
Akihiko Nakamura	Points	892	876	586	758	918	884	633	819	642	837	7745	16
Keisuke Ushiro	Result	11.51	6.73	14.93	1.89	50.85	15.43	46.85	4.70	56.52	4:43.51	7532	20
Keisuke Ushiro	Points	750	750	785	705	776	798	805	819	686	658	7532	20

=== Women ===
Track and road events

Athlete	Event	Heat		Semifinal		Final	
Athlete	Event	Result	Rank	Result	Rank	Result	Rank
Chisato Fukushima	100 metres	11.23 SB	3 Q	11.32	7	Did not advance	
Chisato Fukushima	200 metres	23.30	5	Did not advance			
Misaki Onishi	5000 metres	15:33.84	6 q	—N/a		15:29.63	14
Azusa Sumi	5000 metres	16:13.65	11	—N/a		Did not advance	
Ayuko Suzuki	5000 metres	15:28.18	6 q	—N/a		15:08.29 PB	9
Kasumi Nishihara	10,000 metres	—N/a				32:12.95	13
Rei Ohara	10,000 metres	—N/a				32:47.74	22
Yuka Takashima	10,000 metres	—N/a				32:27.79	20
Mai Ito	Marathon	—N/a				2:29:48	7
Sairi Maeda	Marathon	—N/a				2:31:46	13
Risa Shigetomo	Marathon	—N/a				2:32:37	14
Seika Aoyama; Kana Ichikawa; Asami Chiba; Sayaka Aoki	4 × 400 metres relay	3:28.91 NR	7	—N/a		Did not advance	
Kumiko Okada	20 kilometres walk	—N/a				1:34:56	25

Field events

Athlete	Event	Qualification		Final	
Athlete	Event	Distance	Position	Distance	Position
Yuki Ebihara	Javelin throw	60.30	19	Did not advance	
