= Ethiopia at the 2015 World Championships in Athletics =

- WA code: ETH

in Beijing
- Competitors: 32
- Medals Ranked 5th: Gold 3 Silver 3 Bronze 2 Total 8

World Championships in Athletics appearances
- 1983; 1987; 1991; 1993; 1995; 1997; 1999; 2001; 2003; 2005; 2007; 2009; 2011; 2013; 2015; 2017; 2019; 2022; 2023; 2025

Ethiopia competed at the 2015 World Championships in Athletics in Beijing, China, from 22 to 30 August 2015.

== Medalists ==
The following competitors from Ethiopia won medals at the Championships

Medal	Athlete	Event	Date
Gold	Genzebe Dibaba	Women's 1500 metres	25 August
Gold	Mare Dibaba	Women's marathon	30 August
Gold	Almaz Ayana	Women's 5000 metres	30 August
Silver	Yemane Tsegay	Men's marathon	22 August
Silver	Gelete Burka	Women's 10,000 metres	24 August
Silver	Senbere Teferi	Women's 5000 metres	30 August
Bronze	Hagos Gebrhiwet	Men's 5000 metres	29 August
Bronze	Genzebe Dibaba	Women's 5000 metres	30 August

== Results ==
(q – qualified, NM – no mark, SB – season best)

=== Men ===
Track and road events

Athlete	Event	Heat		Semifinal		Final	
Athlete	Event	Result	Rank	Result	Rank	Result	Rank
Mohammed Aman	800 metres	1:47.87	22 Q	DQ		did not advance	
Jena Umar	800 metres	1:47.03	15 q	1:48.68	20	did not advance	
Mekonnen Gebremedhin	1500 metres	3:38.66	8 q	3:44.31	18	did not advance	
Dawit Wolde	1500 metres	3:44.90	35	did not advance			
Aman Wote	1500 metres	3:39.05	12 Q	3:35.97	7 q	DNF	
Yomif Kejelcha	5000 metres	13:19.38	1 Q	—N/a		13:52.43	4
Hagos Gebrhiwet	5000 metres	13:45.00	16 Q	—N/a		13:51.86	3rd place, bronze medalist(s)
Imane Merga	5000 metres	13:45.41	20 Q	—N/a		14:01.60	13
Imane Merga	10,000 metres	—N/a				DNF	
Muktar Edris	10,000 metres	—N/a				27:54.47	10
Mosinet Geremew	10,000 metres	—N/a				28:07.50	11
Hailemariyam Amare	3000 metres steeplechase	8:25.36	6 q	—N/a		8:26.19	12
Tolosa Nurgi	3000 metres steeplechase	8:27.65	10 q	—N/a		8:44.81	15
Tafese Seboka	3000 metres steeplechase	8:47.73	24	—N/a		did not advance	
Lelisa Desisa	Marathon	—N/a				2:14:53	7
Berhanu Lemi	Marathon	—N/a				2:17:37	15
Yemane Tsegay	Marathon	—N/a				2:13:07 SB	2nd place, silver medalist(s)

=== Women ===
Track and road events

Athlete	Event	Heat		Semifinal		Final	
Athlete	Event	Result	Rank	Result	Rank	Result	Rank
Habitam Alemu	800 metres	2:03.19	38	did not advance			
Dawit Seyaum	1500 metres	4:09.64	23 Q	4:15.46	13 Q	4:10.26	4
Besu Sado	1500 metres	4:05.39	4 Q	4:17.17	18	did not advance	
Genzebe Dibaba	1500 metres	4:02.59	1 Q	4:06.74	1 Q	4:08.09	1st place, gold medalist(s)
Genzebe Dibaba	5000 metres	15:20.82	4 Q	—N/a		14:44.14	3rd place, bronze medalist(s)
Almaz Ayana	5000 metres	15:09.40	1 Q	—N/a		14:26.83 CR	1st place, gold medalist(s)
Senbere Teferi	5000 metres	15:14.57	2 Q	—N/a		14:44.07	2nd place, silver medalist(s)
Gelete Burka	10,000 metres	—N/a				31:41.77	2nd place, silver medalist(s)
Alemitu Heroye	10,000 metres	—N/a				31:49.73	7
Belaynesh Oljira	10,000 metres	—N/a				31:53.01	9
Hiwot Ayalew	3000 metres steeplechase	9:25.55	3 Q	—N/a		9:24.27	6
Sofia Assefa	3000 metres steeplechase	9:26.47	6 Q	—N/a		9:20.01 SB	4
Etenesh Diro	3000 metres steeplechase	9:31.97	17	—N/a		did not advance	
Birtukan Fente	3000 metres steeplechase	9:39.77	24	—N/a		did not advance	
Mare Dibaba	Marathon	—N/a				2:27:35	1st place, gold medalist(s)
Tigist Tufa	Marathon	—N/a				2:29:12	6
Tirfi Tsegaye	Marathon	—N/a				2:30:54	8
