= Yuka Takashima =

Japanese long-distance runner

Personal information
- Born: 12 May 1988 (age 38) Hōfu, Yamaguchi
- Height: 153 cm (5 ft 0 in)
- Weight: 39 kg (86 lb)

Sport
- Country: Japan
- Sport: Track and field
- Updated on 13 August 2016

Yuka Takashima (高島 由香, Takashima Yuka; born 12 May 1988) is a long-distance runner from Japan. She is from Hōfu City, Yamaguchi Prefecture. She competed in the Women's 10,000 metres event at the 2015 World Championships in Athletics in Beijing, China. She also competed in the Women's 10,000 metres event at the 2016 Summer Olympics in Rio de Janeiro, Brazil.

== See also ==
- Japan at the 2015 World Championships in Athletics
