= 2015 World Championships in Athletics – Men's 1500 metres =

2015 World Championships
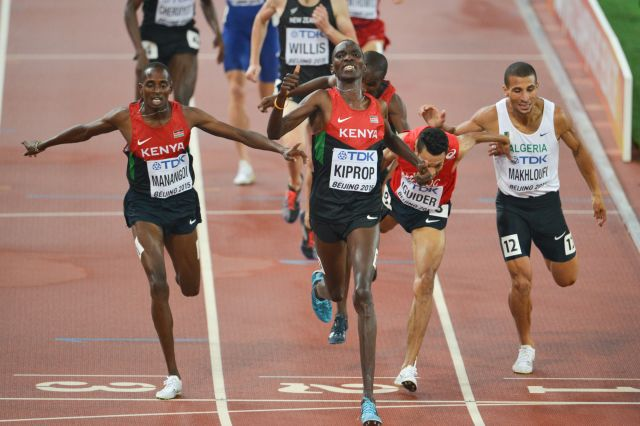
- The blanket finish
- Venue: Beijing National Stadium
- Dates: 27 August (heats); 28 August (semifinals); 30 August (final)
- Competitors: 41 from 23 nations
- Winning time: 3:34.40

Medalists
gold medal	Asbel Kiprop	Kenya
silver medal	Elijah Motonei Manangoi	Kenya
bronze medal	Abdalaati Iguider	Morocco

The men's 1500 metres at the 2015 World Championships in Athletics was held at the Beijing National Stadium on 27, 28 and 30 August. The winning margin was 0.23 seconds.

== Summary ==
The process of running rounds in the 1500m tends to select strategic experts because nobody would want to run hard three times in four days as this schedule would require. Since 2008 (excepting that bad race at the 2012 Olympics), the expert in this has been two-time defending champion Asbel Kiprop. But in case anybody wanted to run fast, Kiprop also left a message at the fastest race of the year in Monaco, where he blew away many of the members of this field by almost 2 seconds in his near miss of the world record. What makes Kiprop so dangerous is his ability to accelerate from the back of the field and in the final that is exactly where he went. Was he hiding or just waiting to pounce? With three other Kenyan teammates making it to the final, there was talk about a potential sweep. Timothy Cheruiyot and Elijah Motonei Manangoi took the race through an honest first two laps in 1:58.62. Only Aman Wote ran aggressively with them at the front, the other tacticians lining themselves up for the finish. Matthew Centrowitz, Jr. was the first to move forward as they came through for the bell. With 300 metres to go, Olympic champion Taoufik Makhloufi made his move, identical to the Olympics, Kiprop near the back of the pack beating only two Americans and boxed by Wote. Over the next 100 metres, Makhloufi opened a lead chase by Abdalaati Iguider. Kiprop slowed down to get out of the box, then ran around Wote out to lane 3. The tall Kenyan was now clearly moving faster than the rest of the field he was passing on the outside. As Kiprop swept past the field after the North African duo, only Silas Kiplagat came with him, these four breaking from the rest. As Kiprop caught Iguider, he reacted and ran even with Kiprop up to Makhloufi. With 50 metres to go, it was three abreast across the track with Kiplagat chasing Kiprop on the outside less than two metres back. Kiprop broke past the two North Africans and ran on to victory, while Iguider edged ahead of a spent Makhloufi. Out of nowhere (actually a distant fifth place) came sprinting Manangoi, faster than any of the leaders, drifting out to lane 3 for clear sailing. Passing three people in the last 10 metres, Manangoi crossed the finish line just ahead of a desperately diving Iguider to take silver, Iguider doing a full face plant to the track across the finish line holding on to bronze.

== Records ==
Prior to the competition, the records were as follows:

World record	Hicham El Guerrouj (MAR)	3:26.00	Rome, Italy	14 July 1998
Championship record	Hicham El Guerrouj (MAR)	3:27.65	Sevilla, Spain	24 August 1999
World Leading	Asbel Kiprop (KEN)	3:26.69	Fontvieille, Monaco	17 July 2015
African Record	Hicham El Guerrouj (MAR)	3:26.00	Rome, Italy	14 July 1998
Asian Record	Rashid Ramzi (BHR)	3:29.14	Rome, Italy	14 July 2006
North, Central American and Caribbean record	Bernard Lagat (USA)	3:29.30	Rieti, Italy	28 August 2005
South American Record	Hudson de Souza (BRA)	3:33.25	Rieti, Italy	28 August 2005
European Record	Mo Farah (GBR)	3:28.81	Fontvieille, Monaco	19 July 2013
Oceanian record	Nick Willis (NZL)	3:29.66	Fontvieille, Monaco	17 July 2015

== Qualification standards ==
Entry standards
3:36.20 (mile: 3:53.30)

== Schedule ==
Date	Time	Round
27 August 2015	10:35	Heats
28 August 2015	19:55	Semifinals
30 August 2015	19:45	Final

All times are local times (UTC+8)

== Results ==
KEY:	q	Fastest non-qualifiers	Q	Qualified	NR	National record	PB	Personal best	SB	Seasonal best

=== Heats ===
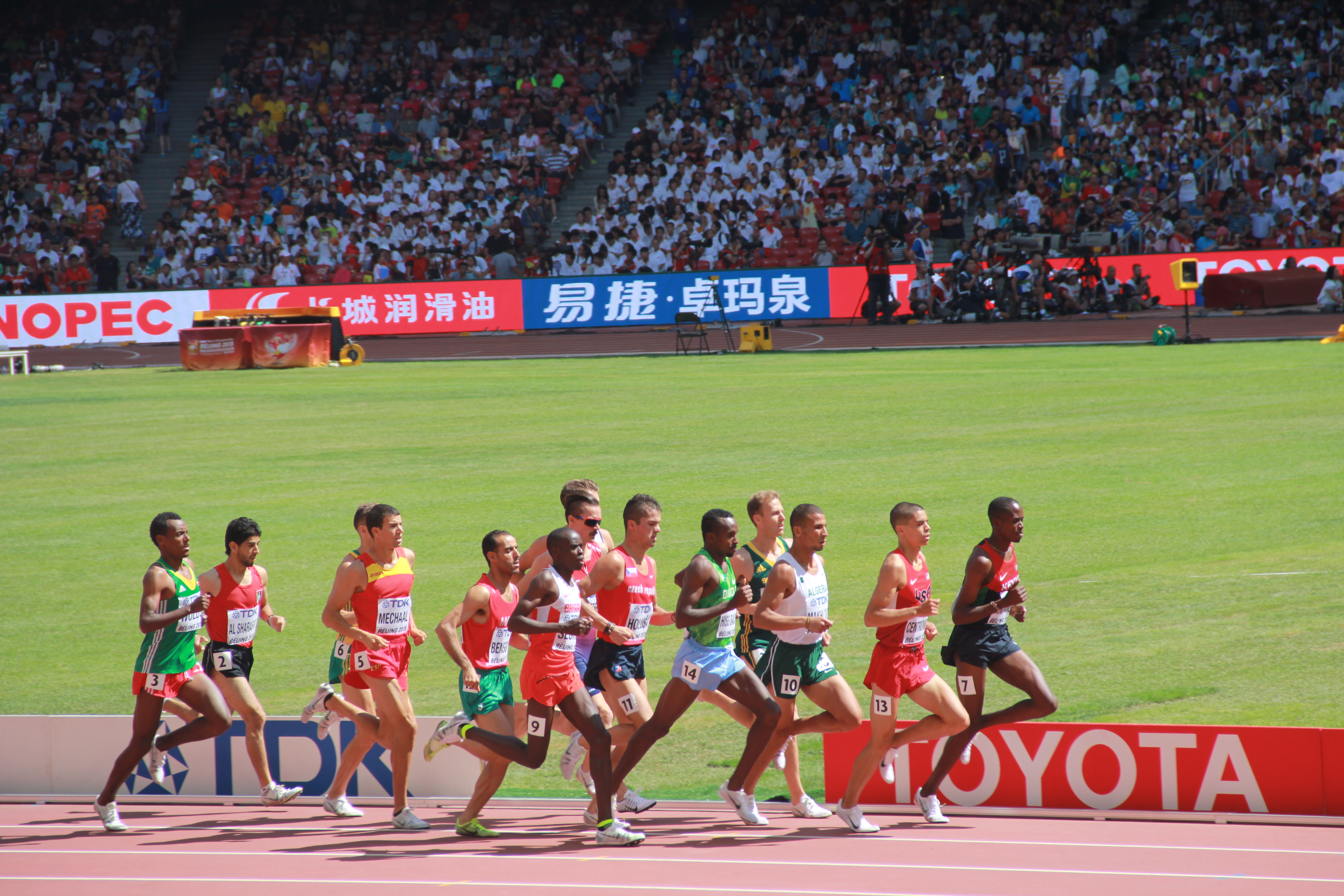

Qualification: First 6 in each heat (Q) and the next 6 fastest (q) advanced to the semifinals.

Rank	Heat	Name	Nationality	Time	Notes
1	3	Silas Kiplagat	Kenya	3:38.13	Q
2	3	Abdalaati Iguider	Morocco	3:38.14	Q
3	3	Nick Willis	New Zealand	3:38.27	Q
4	3	İlham Tanui Özbilen	Turkey	3:38.28	Q
5	3	Chris O'Hare	Great Britain & N.I.	3:38.43	Q
6	3	Timothy Cheruiyot	Kenya	3:38.50	Q
7	3	Robby Andrews	United States	3:38.52	q
8	3	Mekonnen Gebremedhin	Ethiopia	3:38.66	q
8	3	Abdi Waiss Mouhyadin	Djibouti	3:38.66	q
10	3	David Bustos	Spain	3:38.75	q
11	2	Asbel Kiprop	Kenya	3:38.97	Q
12	2	Aman Wote	Ethiopia	3:39.05	Q
13	2	Leonel Manzano	United States	3:39.22	Q
14	2	Pieter-Jan Hannes	Belgium	3:39.31	Q
15	2	Morhad Amdouni	France	3:39.38	Q
16	2	Julian Matthews	New Zealand	3:39.55	Q
17	2	Charles Philibert-Thiboutot	Canada	3:39.72	q
18	3	Carlos Díaz	Chile	3:39.75	q
19	2	Fouad Elkaam	Morocco	3:40.12	
20	3	Yassine Hathat	Algeria	3:40.16	
21	2	Dumisane Hlaselo	South Africa	3:40.25	
22	2	Ronald Musagala	Uganda	3:42.12	
23	1	Elijah Motonei Manangoi	Kenya	3:42.57	Q
24	1	Taoufik Makhloufi	Algeria	3:42.72	Q
25	1	Matthew Centrowitz, Jr.	United States	3:43.17	Q
26	1	Charlie Grice	Great Britain & N.I.	3:43.21	Q
27	1	Yassine Bensghir	Morocco	3:43.22	Q (Later DQ for doping)
28	1	Johan Cronje	South Africa	3:43.29	Q
29	1	Ryan Gregson	Australia	3:43.54	
30	1	Jakub Holuša	Czech Republic	3:43.66	
31	1	Henrik Ingebrigtsen	Norway	3:43.97	
32	1	Youssouf Hiss Bachir	Djibouti	3:44.48	
33	2	Víctor Corrales	Spain	3:44.76	
34	2	Salim Keddar	Algeria	3:44.81	
35	1	Dawit Wolde	Ethiopia	3:44.90	
36	1	Benson Seurei	Bahrain	3:45.70	
37	1	Adel Mechaal	Spain	3:46.05	
38	3	Hélio Gomes	Portugal	3:46.32	
39	3	Erick Rodríguez	Nicaragua	3:49.64	NR
40	1	Awwad Al-Sharafat	Jordan	4:07.72	
	2	Ayanleh Souleiman	Djibouti	DNF	

=== Semifinals ===
Qualification: First 5 in each heat (Q) and the next 2 fastest (q) advanced to the final.

Rank	Heat	Name	Nationality	Time	Notes
1	2	Elijah Motonei Manangoi	Kenya	3:35.00	Q
2	2	Taoufik Makhloufi	Algeria	3:35.05	Q
3	2	Abdalaati Iguider	Morocco	3:35.20	Q
4	2	Charlie Grice	Great Britain & N.I.	3:35.58	Q
5	2	Timothy Cheruiyot	Kenya	3:35.74	Q
6	2	Robby Andrews	United States	3:35.88	q
7	2	Aman Wote	Ethiopia	3:35.97	q
8	2	Johan Cronje	South Africa	3:36.59	
9	2	Morhad Amdouni	France	3:37.79	
10	2	Charles Philibert-Thiboutot	Canada	3:39.62	
11	2	Julian Matthews	New Zealand	3:40.45	
12	2	David Bustos	Spain	3:42.48	
13	1	Asbel Kiprop	Kenya	3:43.48	Q
14	1	Nick Willis	New Zealand	3:43.57	Q
15	1	Silas Kiplagat	Kenya	3:43.64	Q
16	1	Matthew Centrowitz, Jr.	United States	3:43.97	Q
17	1	Leonel Manzano	United States	3:44.28	Q
18	1	Mekonnen Gebremedhin	Ethiopia	3:44.31	
19	1	Chris O'Hare	Great Britain & N.I.	3:44.36	
20	1	Pieter-Jan Hannes	Belgium	3:44.38	
21	1	Yassine Bensghir	Morocco	3:44.95	(Later DQ for doping)
22	1	İlham Tanui Özbilen	Turkey	3:45.70	
23	1	Abdi Waiss Mouhyadin	Djibouti	3:46.82	
24	1	Carlos Díaz	Chile	3:47.48	

=== Final ===
The final was held on 30 August at 19:45.

Rank	Name	Nationality	Time	Notes
1st place, gold medalist(s)	Asbel Kiprop	Kenya	3:34.40	
2nd place, silver medalist(s)	Elijah Motonei Manangoi	Kenya	3:34.63	
3rd place, bronze medalist(s)	Abdalaati Iguider	Morocco	3:34.67	
4	Taoufik Makhloufi	Algeria	3:34.76	
5	Silas Kiplagat	Kenya	3:34.81	
6	Nick Willis	New Zealand	3:35.46	
7	Timothy Cheruiyot	Kenya	3:36.05	
8	Matthew Centrowitz, Jr.	United States	3:36.13	
9	Charlie Grice	Great Britain & N.I.	3:36.21	
10	Leonel Manzano	United States	3:37.26	
11	Robby Andrews	United States	3:38.29	
	Aman Wote	Ethiopia	DNF	
