= 2015 World Championships in Athletics – Men's 20 kilometres walk =

Men's 20 kilometres walk at the 2015 World Championships
- Venue: Beijing National Stadium
- Dates: 23 August
- Competitors: 61 from 33 nations
- Winning time: 1:19:14

Medalists
gold medal	Miguel Ángel López	Spain
silver medal	Wang Zhen	China
bronze medal	Benjamin Thorne	Canada

The men's 20 kilometres walk at the 2015 World Championships in Athletics was held at the Beijing National Stadium on 23 August.

== Summary ==
From the gun, the three Chinese athletes made it clear they were going to make an effort to take this home race. The effort almost worked, as the group ultimately led by Olympic bronze medalist Wang Zhen held the lead until the bell. At almost that moment, returning bronze medalist Miguel Ángel López had finally worked his way back to the lead. The strain of leading showed on Wang's face as Lopez cruised past. Lopez built upon that lead for the final lap and route back into the stadium. Canadian Benjamin Thorne set the Canadian record on his way to the bronze medal in a national record time.

A deeper story might be in who was not here. After years of the Viktor Chegin drug related cheating scandal, no Russian athlete entered the race, ending their dominance of world podiums. Recent world record setting Yusuke Suzuki also dropped out near the half way mark with a hip injury. Andrés Chocho was making an effort to challenge the leaders late into the race, but instead was invited to leave the course with a red paddle.

== Records ==
Prior to the competition, the records were as follows:

World record	Yusuke Suzuki (JPN)	1:16:36	Nomi, Japan	15 March 2015
Championship record	Jefferson Pérez (ECU)	1:17:21	Saint-Denis, France	23 August 2003
World Leading	Yusuke Suzuki (JPN)	1:16:36	Nomi, Japan	15 March 2015
African record	Hatem Ghoula (TUN)	1:19:02	Eisenhüttenstadt, Germany	10 May 1997
Asian record	Yusuke Suzuki (JPN)	1:16:36	Nomi, Japan	15 March 2015
North, Central American and Caribbean record	Julio René Martínez (GUA)	1:17:46	Eisenhüttenstadt, Germany	8 May 1999
South American record	Jefferson Pérez (ECU)	1:17:21	Saint-Denis, France	23 August 2003
European record	Yohann Diniz (FRA)	1:17:02	Arles, France	8 March 2015
Oceanian record	Nathan Deakes (AUS)	1:17:33	Cixi, China	23 April 2005

== Qualification standards ==
Time
1:25:00

== Schedule ==
Date	Time	Round
23 August 2015	08:30	Final

All times are local times (UTC+8)

== Results ==
The race was started at 08:30.

KEY:	NR	National record	PB	Personal best	SB	Seasonal best

Rank	Name	Nationality	Time	Notes
1st place, gold medalist(s)	Miguel Ángel López	Spain	1:19:14	PB
2nd place, silver medalist(s)	Wang Zhen	China	1:19:29	
3rd place, bronze medalist(s)	Benjamin Thorne	Canada	1:19:57	NR
4	Ihor Hlavan	Ukraine	1:20:29	SB
5	Cai Zelin	China	1:20:42	
6	Caio Bonfim	Brazil	1:20:44	SB
7	Éider Arévalo	Colombia	1:21:13	
8	Dane Bird-Smith	Australia	1:21:37	
9	Chen Ding	China	1:21:39	
10	Kim Hyun-sub	South Korea	1:21:40	
11	Lebogang Shange	South Africa	1:21:43	NR
12	Evan Dunfee	Canada	1:21:48	SB
13	Isamu Fujisawa	Japan	1:21:51	
14	Inaki Gomez	Canada	1:21:55	SB
15	Eder Sánchez	Mexico	1:21:56	SB
16	Álvaro Martín	Spain	1:22:04	
17	Quentin Rew	New Zealand	1:22:18	SB
18	Hagen Pohle	Germany	1:22:29	
19	Massimo Stano	Italy	1:22:53	
20	Giorgio Rubino	Italy	1:23:23	
21	Ruslan Dmytrenko	Ukraine	1:23:37	
22	José Leonardo Montaña	Colombia	1:23:53	
23	Dzianis Simanovich	Belarus	1:23:54	
24	Tom Bosworth	Great Britain & N.I.	1:23:58	
25	Alexandros Papamichail	Greece	1:24:11	
26	Jared Tallent	Australia	1:24:19	
27	Federico Tontodonati	Italy	1:24:33	
28	Horacio Nava	Mexico	1:24:40	SB
29	Diego Garcia	Spain	1:24:52	
30	Georgiy Sheiko	Kazakhstan	1:24:58	
31	Julio César Salazar	Mexico	1:24:58	
32	Chris Erickson	Australia	1:25:15	
33	Kévin Campion	France	1:25:16	
34	Nils Brembach	Germany	1:25:21	
35	Gurmeet Singh	India	1:25:22	
36	João Vieira	Portugal	1:25:49	
37	Mauricio Arteaga	Ecuador	1:25:50	
38	Christopher Linke	Germany	1:26:10	
39	Ivan Losyev	Ukraine	1:26:32	
40	Anatole Ibáñez	Sweden	1:26:34	
41	Chandan Singh	India	1:26:40	
42	Juan Manuel Cano	Argentina	1:27:10	
43	Marco Antonio Rodríguez	Bolivia	1:27:15	
44	Anton Kučmín	Slovakia	1:27:46	
45	Choe Byeong-kwang	South Korea	1:28:01	
46	Richard Vargas	Venezuela	1:28:18	
47	Eiki Takahashi	Japan	1:28:30	
48	José María Raymundo	Guatemala	1:29:01	
49	Yerko Araya	Chile	1:29:12	
50	Kenny Martín Pérez	Colombia	1:29:31	
	Pavel Chihuán	Peru	DNF	
	Perseus Karlström	Sweden	DNF	
	Baljinder Singh	India	DNF	
	Yusuke Suzuki	Japan	DNF	
	Erik Tysse	Norway	DNF	
	Sérgio Vieira	Portugal	DNF	
	Byun Young-jun	South Korea	DQ	
	Andrés Chocho	Ecuador	DQ	
	Aliaksandr Liakhovich	Belarus	DQ	
	Marius Šavelskis	Lithuania	DQ	
	Alex Wright	Ireland	DQ	
