= Turkey at the 2015 World Championships in Athletics =

- WA code: TUR
- Website: www.taf.org.tr

in Beijing
- Competitors: 12
- Medals: Gold 0 Silver 0 Bronze 0 Total 0

World Championships in Athletics appearances (overview)
- 1983; 1987; 1991; 1993; 1995; 1997; 1999; 2001; 2003; 2005; 2007; 2009; 2011; 2013; 2015; 2017; 2019; 2022; 2023; 2025

Turkey competed at the 2015 World Championships in Athletics in Beijing, China, from 22–30 August 2015.

== Results ==
(q – qualified, NM – no mark, SB – season best)

=== Men ===
Track and road events

Athlete	Event	Heat		Semifinal		Final	
Athlete	Event	Result	Rank	Result	Rank	Result	Rank
Jak Ali Harvey	100 metres	10.04	3 Q	10.08	5	Did not advance	
Ramil Guliyev	200 metres	20.01 NR	1 Q	20.10	3 q	20.11	6
İlham Tanui Özbilen	1500 metres	3:38.28	4 Q	3:45.70	10	Did not advance	
Ali Kaya	5000 metres	13:21.46	9 q	—N/a		13:56.51	9
Ali Kaya	10,000 metres	—N/a				27:43.69	7
Bekir Karayel	Marathon	—N/a				DNF	
Yasmani Copello	400 metres hurdles	48.89 NR	1 Q	48.46 NR	4 q	48.96	6
Halil Akkaş	3000 metres steeplechase	8:54.04	10	—N/a		Did not advance	

Field events

Athlete	Event	Qualification		Final	
Athlete	Event	Distance	Position	Distance	Position
Eşref Apak	Hammer throw	73.01	17	Did not advance	

=== Women ===
Track and road events

Athlete	Event	Heat		Semifinal		Final	
Athlete	Event	Result	Rank	Result	Rank	Result	Rank
Özlem Kaya	3000 metres steeplechase	9:30.23 PB	7 q	—N/a		9:34.66	13
Tuğba Güvenç	3000 metres steeplechase	9:58.07	11	—N/a		Did not advance	
Sultan Haydar	Marathon	—N/a				2:47:11	43

Field events

Athlete	Event	Qualification		Final	
Athlete	Event	Distance	Position	Distance	Position
Kıvılcım Kaya	Hammer throw	67.98	20	Did not advance	
