= 2015 World Championships in Athletics – Men's 5000 metres =

Men's 5000 metres at the 2015 World Championships
- Venue: Beijing National Stadium
- Dates: 26 August (heats); 29 August (final)
- Competitors: 40 from 24 nations
- Winning time: 13:50.38

Medalists
gold medal	Mo Farah	Great Britain
silver medal	Caleb Mwangangi Ndiku	Kenya
bronze medal	Hagos Gebrhiwet	Ethiopia

The men's 5000 metres at the 2015 World Championships in Athletics was held at the Beijing National Stadium on 26 and 29 August.

== Summary ==
It was difficult to predict the results. Down at number 21 was the double Olympic Champion, defending champion attempting to repeat his double from two years earlier, Mo Farah, undoubtedly the favorite. At number 3 was returning silver medalist Hagos Gebrhiwet coming from the fastest race of the year in Rome, won by his Ethiopian teammate, World Junior Champion Yomif Kejelcha. Returning bronze medalist Isiah Koech was down at number 13. 2014 Diamond League Champion and Commonwealth Games Champion Caleb Mwangangi Ndiku was nowhere to be seen in the top 50 in the world, not having to qualify in the Kenyan trials.

In the finals, it was a slow pace at the beginning. Absurdly, the organizers placed a water station in lane 9, instead of lane 3 where it was located during the 10,000. At 1200 metres, with the pace dawdling, Farah alone chose to take advantage of the water stop, having to run all the way across the track in both directions, but still maintaining contact with the back of the field. At the front of the pack, by default, was a British uniform, but not Farah, it was Tom Farrell with eyes wandering to the TV monitors.

After five and a half laps, Farah jogged to the outside past the entire field to behind Farrell. Suddenly the scramble was on, people rushing for position. Imane Merga rushed to the front and took a 2-meter lead. Farah marked that and let Merga lead until four and a half laps to go still at an agonizingly slow pace, then Farah decided to take the lead and move just slightly faster. All of the other favorites jockeyed around but none of them seemed to make an attempt to pass him.

Having watched Farah launch his kick from 500 meters out in the 10,000 metres earlier in this meet, Ndiku tried to go one better and started to run for home with more than 800 to go, Farah running to stay in contact, Gebrhiwet, Galen Rupp, Ben True and Kejelcha in tow. For the next lap the field stretched out. Farah made a brief burst tor try to take the lead just before one lap to go, but Ndiku wouldn't let him by. One by one all the other suitors fell off the back, the last Gebrhiwet, finally fading on the backstretch, but Farah crept closer. Around the final turn, Kejelcha passed Gebrhiwet, while Farah moved into position to launch a final kick. With a perfectly executed final sprint, Farah passed Ndiku with 70 metres to go, Ndiku had nothing in the tank to respond with. Behind them Gebrhiwet executed a similar pass against his teammate Kejelcha to take the bronze.

Ndiku ran the next to the last lap in 56.3 (Farah slightly slower), Farah completed the last 800 metres in 1:49.0 Despite the assortment of national affiliations listed, the entire pack, the top 13 finishers came from just four countries, three of them neighboring countries of East Africa; Somalia 1-12, Kenya 2-8-9-10-11, Ethiopia 3-4-13 and USA 5-6-7.

== Records ==
Prior to the competition, the records were as follows:

World record	Kenenisa Bekele (ETH)	12:37.35	Hengelo, Netherlands	31 May 2004
Championship record	Eliud Kipchoge (KEN)	12:52.79	Saint-Denis, France	31 August 2003
World Leading	Yomif Kejelcha (ETH)	12:58.39	Rome, Italy	4 June 2015
African Record	Kenenisa Bekele (ETH)	12:37.35	Hengelo, Netherlands	31 May 2004
Asian Record	Albert Kibichii Rop (BHR)	12:51.96	Fontvieille, Monaco	19 July 2013
North, Central American and Caribbean record	Bernard Lagat (USA)	12:53.60	Fontvieille, Monaco	22 July 2011
South American Record	Marilson dos Santos (BRA)	13:19.43	Kassel, Germany	8 June 2006
European Record	Mohammed Mourhit (BEL)	12:49.71	Brussels, Belgium	25 August 2000
Oceanian record	Craig Mottram (AUS)	12:55.76	London, Great Britain	30 July 2004

== Qualification standards ==
Entry standards
13:23.00

== Schedule ==
Date	Time	Round
26 August 2015	09:35	Heats
29 August 2015	19:30	Final

All times are local times (UTC+8)

== Results ==
=== Heats ===
Qualification: First 5 in each heat (Q) and the next 5 fastest (q) advanced to the final.

Rank	Heat	Name	Nationality	Time	Notes
1	2	Yomif Kejelcha	Ethiopia	13:19.38	Q
2	2	Mo Farah	Great Britain & N.I.	13:19.44	Q
3	2	Mohammed Ahmed	Canada	13:19.58	Q, SB
4	2	Caleb Mwangangi Ndiku	Kenya	13:19.58	Q, SB
5	2	Albert Kibichii Rop	Bahrain	13:19.61	Q
6	2	Ryan Hill	United States	13:19.67	q
7	2	Richard Ringer	Germany	13:19.84	q
8	2	Galen Rupp	United States	13:20.78	q
9	2	Ali Kaya	Turkey	13:21.46	q
10	2	Isiah Koech	Kenya	13:23.51	q
11	2	Aron Kifle	Eritrea	13:25.85	
12	2	Phillip Kipyeko	Uganda	13:26.20	
13	2	Ilias Fifa	Spain	13:28.29	
14	2	Hayle Ibrahimov	Azerbaijan	13:28.77	
15	2	Collis Birmingham	Australia	13:34.58	
16	1	Hagos Gebrhiwet	Ethiopia	13:45.00	Q
17	1	Ben True	United States	13:45.09	Q
18	1	Edwin Soi	Kenya	13:45.28	Q
19	1	Tom Farrell	Great Britain & N.I.	13:45.29	Q
20	1	Imane Merga	Ethiopia	13:45.41	Q
21	1	Abrar Osman	Eritrea	13:45.55	
22	1	Suguru Osako	Japan	13:45.82	
23	1	Emmanuel Kipsang	Kenya	13:46.43	
24	1	Cameron Levins	Canada	13:48.72	
25	1	Brett Robinson	Australia	13:49.63	
26	2	Jesús España	Spain	13:51.47	
27	1	Alemayehu Bezabeh	Spain	13:54.13	
28	1	Dennis Licht	Netherlands	13:57.61	
29	1	Othmane El Goumri	Morocco	13:58.06	
30	1	Sindre Buraas	Norway	13:59.07	
31	1	Kemoy Campbell	Jamaica	14:00.55	
32	2	Kota Murayama	Japan	14:07.11	
33	1	Aweke Ayalew	Bahrain	14:07.18	
34	2	Duo Bujie	China	14:07.35	
35	1	Félicien Muhitira	Rwanda	14:11.12	PB
36	1	Víctor Aravena	Chile	14:29.34	
37	1	Stuart Banda	Malawi	14:49.31	PB
38	2	Suleiman Abdille Borai	Somalia	15:26.65	PB
39	2	Abdullah Al-Qwabani	Yemen	16:02.55	PB
	2	Younés Essalhi	Morocco	DNF	
	1	Bashir Abdi	Belgium	DNS	

=== Final ===
The final was started at 19:30

Rank	Name	Nationality	Time	Notes
1st place, gold medalist(s)	Mo Farah	Great Britain & N.I.	13:50.38	
2nd place, silver medalist(s)	Caleb Mwangangi Ndiku	Kenya	13:51.75	
3rd place, bronze medalist(s)	Hagos Gebrhiwet	Ethiopia	13:51.86	
4	Yomif Kejelcha	Ethiopia	13:52.43	
5	Galen Rupp	United States	13:53.90	
6	Ben True	United States	13:54.07	
7	Ryan Hill	United States	13:55.10	
8	Isiah Koech	Kenya	13:55.98	
9	Ali Kaya	Turkey	13:56.51	
10	Edwin Soi	Kenya	13:59.02	
11	Albert Kibichii Rop	Bahrain	14:00.12	
12	Mohammed Ahmed	Canada	14:00.38	
13	Imane Merga	Ethiopia	14:01.60	
14	Richard Ringer	Germany	14:03.72	
15	Tom Farrell	Great Britain & N.I.	14:08.87	
