= Scott Smith (runner) =

American athlete (born 1986)

Personal information
- Born: July 13, 1986 (age 39)

Sport
- Country: United States
- Sport: Track and field
- Event: Marathon
- Turned pro: 2010
- Coached by: Ben Rosario
- Retired: 2021

Scott Smith (born July 13, 1986) is an American long-distance runner who specialized in the marathon. He competed in the marathon event at the 2015 World Championships in Athletics in Beijing, China. For his collegiate career, Smith attended University of California, Santa Barbara.
