= 2015 World Championships in Athletics – Men's marathon =

Men's marathon at the 2015 World Championships
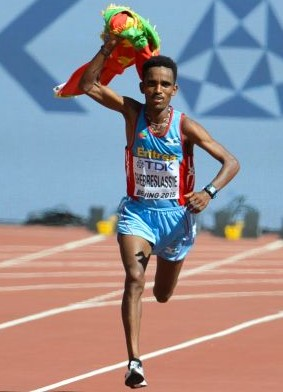
- Victorious Ghirmay Ghebreslassie
- Venue: Beijing National Stadium
- Dates: 22 August
- Competitors: 67 from 38 nations
- Winning time: 2:12:27

Medalists
gold medal	Ghirmay Ghebreslassie	Eritrea
silver medal	Yemane Tsegay	Ethiopia
bronze medal	Solomon Mutai	Uganda

The men's marathon at the 2015 World Championships in Athletics was held at the Beijing National Stadium on 22 August.

The name Gebrselassie is familiar in running circles, but this race was won by Haile's sound alike Ghirmay Ghebreslassie from a different country, neighboring Eritrea. Not only was he the youngest winner of a World Championship marathon, he was the first gold medalist for his country ever.

The early leader was Ser-Od Bat-Ochir, then Daniele Meucci and Ruggero Pertile getting camera time to the half way mark while the favorites including defending champion Stephen Kiprotich stayed slightly off the pace. Ghebreslassie marked the more experienced runners. Tsepo Ramonene made a breakaway at 25 km opening up a 30-second lead. As he watched two Kenyans drop out and other favorites struggle, Ghebreslassie decided to set loose at 34 km. Over the next couple of kilometers, he made up the gap and passed Ramonene with authority. But a couple of kilometers later Yemane Tsegay passed Ghebreslassie. Tsegay's lead only lasted two minutes until Ghebreslassie took the lead for good. Over the final kilometers, he extended his lead to 40 seconds. Running relaxed and fast like an exuberant teenager, he was handed an Eritrean flag as he entered the stadium. He held his flag but kept on running past the finish line until officials were able to tell him he was done. “I’ve never finished in a stadium before.” Behind him, in comparison, Tsegay, Solomon Mutai and the other runners finished looking as if they had just finished a marathon.

== Records ==
Prior to the competition, the records were as follows:

World record	Dennis Kipruto Kimetto (KEN)	2:02:57	Berlin, Germany	28 September 2014
Championship record	Abel Kirui (KEN)	2:06:54	Berlin, Germany	22 August 2009
World Leading	Eliud Kipchoge (KEN)	2:04:42	London, Great Britain	26 April 2015
African Record	Dennis Kipruto Kimetto (KEN)	2:02:57	Berlin, Germany	28 September 2014
Asian Record	Toshinari Takaoka (JPN)	2:06:16	Chicago, United States	13 October 2002
North, Central American and Caribbean record	Khalid Khannouchi (USA)	2:05:38	London, Great Britain	14 April 2002
South American Record	Ronaldo da Costa (BRA)	2:06:05	Berlin, Germany	20 September 1998
European Record	Benoit Zwierzchiewski (FRA)	2:06:36	Paris, France	6 April 2003
Oceanian record	Robert de Castella (AUS)	2:07:51	Boston, United States	21 April 1986

== Qualification standards ==
Time
2:18:00

== Schedule ==
Date	Time	Round
22 August 2015	07:35	Final

All times are local times (UTC+8)

== Results ==
The race was started at 07:35.

KEY:	NR	National record	PB	Personal best	SB	Seasonal best

Rank	Name	Nationality	Time	Notes
1st place, gold medalist(s)	Ghirmay Ghebreslassie	Eritrea	2:12:27	
2nd place, silver medalist(s)	Yemane Tsegay	Ethiopia	2:13:07	SB
3rd place, bronze medalist(s)	Solomon Mutai	Uganda	2:13:29	
4	Ruggero Pertile	Italy	2:14:22	SB
5	Shumi Dechasa	Bahrain	2:14:35	
6	Stephen Kiprotich	Uganda	2:14:42	
7	Lelisa Desisa	Ethiopia	2:14:53	
8	Daniele Meucci	Italy	2:14:53	
9	Amanuel Mesel	Eritrea	2:15:06	
10	Jackson Kiprop	Uganda	2:15:15	
11	Pak Chol	North Korea	2:15:44	SB
12	Alphonce Felix Simbu	Tanzania	2:16:58	
13	Javier Guerra	Spain	2:17:00	
14	Tsepo Mathibelle	Lesotho	2:17:17	SB
15	Berhanu Lemi	Ethiopia	2:17:37	
16	Abdelhadi El Hachimi	Belgium	2:17:41	
17	Aleksey Reunkov	Russia	2:18:12	
18	Solonei da Silva	Brazil	2:19:20	
19	Tadesse Abraham	Switzerland	2:19:25	
20	Roman Fosti	Estonia	2:20:35	
21	Masakazu Fujiwara	Japan	2:21:06	SB
22	Mark Korir	Kenya	2:21:20	
23	Cuthbert Nyasango	Zimbabwe	2:22:15	SB
24	Xu Wang	China	2:23:08	
25	Ian Burrell	United States	2:23:17	SB
26	Pierre-Célestin Nihorimbere	Burundi	2:23:29	
27	Ezekiel Jafary	Tanzania	2:23:43	SB
28	Scott Smith	United States	2:23:53	SB
29	Anuradha Cooray	Sri Lanka	2:25:04	
30	Cephas Pasipamiri	Zimbabwe	2:25:05	SB
31	Roman Prodius	Moldova	2:26:46	
32	Edwin Kipchirchir Kemboi	Austria	2:28:06	
33	Ho Chin-ping	Chinese Taipei	2:28:14	
34	Guan Siyang	China	2:30:17	
35	Henri Manninen	Finland	2:30:22	SB
36	David Nilsson	Sweden	2:31:24	
37	Gilbert Mutandiro	Zimbabwe	2:31:35	
38	Bat-Ochiryn Ser-Od	Mongolia	2:32:09	
39	Noh Si-hwan	South Korea	2:32:35	
40	Kazuhiro Maeda	Japan	2:32:49	
41	Desmond Mokgobu	South Africa	2:34:11	
42	Fabiano Joseph Naasi	Tanzania	2:35:27	SB
	Wissem Hosni	Tunisia	DNF	
	Bekir Karayel	Turkey	DNF	
	Abraham Kiplimo	Uganda	DNF	
	Edmilson Santana	Brazil	DNF	
	Ivan Babaryka	Ukraine	DNF	
	Oleksandr Babarynka	Ukraine	DNF	
	Jeffrey Eggleston	United States	DNF	
	Sibusiso Nzima	South Africa	DNF	
	Gilberto Lopes	Brazil	DNF	
	Muhan Hasi	China	DNF	
	Richer Pérez	Cuba	DNF	
	Beraki Beyene	Eritrea	DNF	
	Carles Castillejo	Spain	DNF	
	Mihail Krassilov	Kazakhstan	DNF	
	Yu Seung-yeop	South Korea	DNF	
	Dennis Kipruto Kimetto	Kenya	DNF	
	Wilson Kipsang Kiprotich	Kenya	DNF	
	Mohammad Jafar Moradi	Iran	DNF	
	Aadam Ismaeel Khamis	Bahrain	DNF	
	Hasan Mahboob	Bahrain	DNF	
	Adil Annani	Morocco	DNF	
	Rachid Kisri	Morocco	DNF	
	Abel Villanueva	Peru	DNF	
	Marius Ionescu	Romania	DNF	
	Thabiso Benedict Moeng	South Africa	DNF	
	Guor Marial	South Sudan	DNS	
