= Henri Manninen =

Finnish long-distance runner

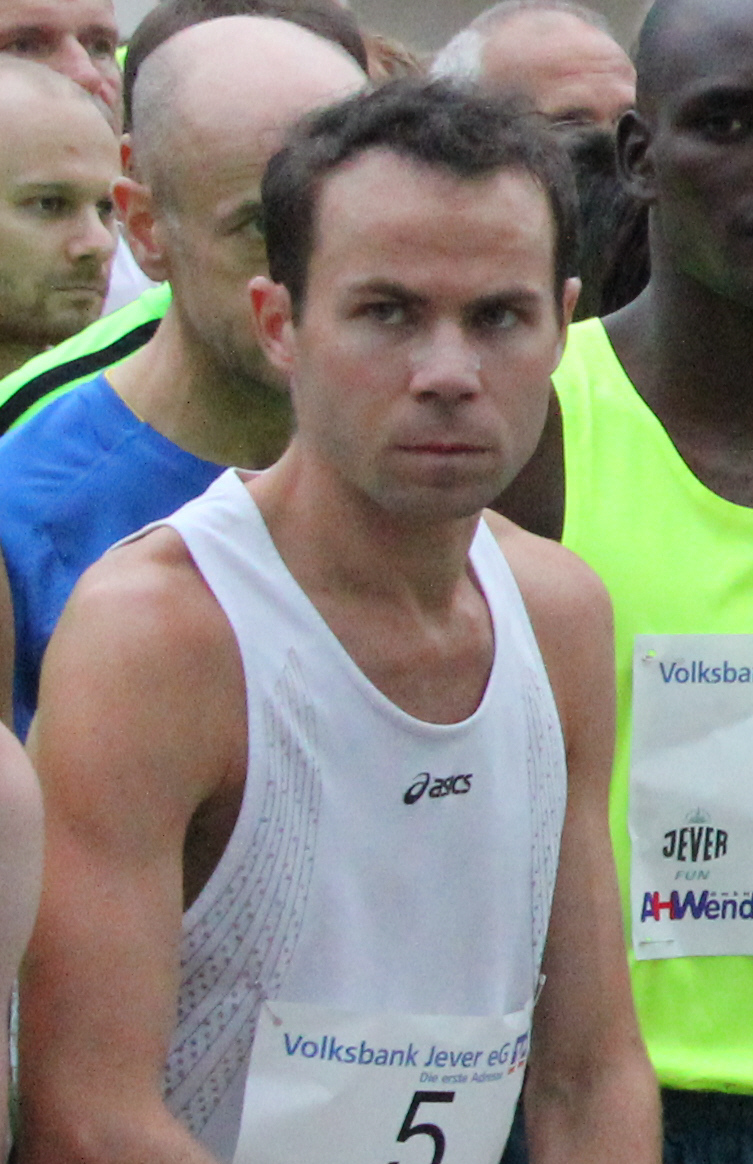
- Manninen in 2014

Personal information
- Born: 3 January 1985 (age 41)

Sport
- Country: Finland
- Sport: Track and field
- Event: Marathon

Henri Manninen (born 3 January 1985) is a Finnish long-distance runner who specialises in the marathon. He competed in the marathon event at the 2015 World Championships in Athletics in Beijing, China.
