= Fiona Benson (athlete) =

Canadian middle-distance runner

Personal information
- Born: 25 May 1992 (age 34)

Sport
- Country: Canada
- Sport: Track and field
- Event: 800 metres

Fiona Benson (born 25 May 1992) is a Canadian middle-distance runner. She competed in the 800 metres event at the 2015 World Championships in Athletics in Beijing, China.

== Career ==
From 2011 to 2015 she ran at Trinity Western University.

Benson began the 2015 season with a 10k on the road at Vancouver Sun Run where she ran 35:49. In April 2015, she had a personal best of 2:07. Benson started a string of personal best on 30 May 2015 at the 2015 Christie-Phoenix Insurance Victoria Run Series where she won in 2:01.58. She then won the 2015 Victoria International Track Classic in a then personal best time of 2:01.02. She ran the team standard to represent Canada at the 2015 World Championships in Athletics, where she again ran a personal best time of 1:59.59 in the semi-finals of the 800 metres, placing 17th overall.

== Personal bests ==
- Mile (2015): 4:25.79
- 800 (2015): 1:59.59
