= Ghirmay Ghebreslassie =

Eritrean long-distance runner

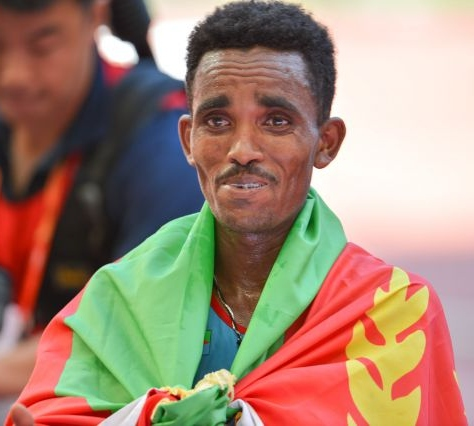
- Ghebreslassie in 2015

Personal information
- Born: 14 November 1995 (age 30) Kisadeka, Eritrea

Sport
- Country: Eritrea
- Sport: Track and field, long-distance running
- Events: 10,000 metres, marathon
Medal record
Representing Eritrea
World Championships
Gold medal – first place	2015 Beijing	Marathon

Ghirmay Ghebreslassie (Ge'ez: ግርማይ ገብረስላሰ, born 14 November 1995) is an Eritrean long-distance runner. He won the 2015 World Championships in Athletics marathon in Beijing, China, becoming the youngest winner of the race at age 19 and became the first Eritrean to win a gold medal at the World Championships. On 6 November 2016, Ghirmay was the top men's finisher at the New York City Marathon, becoming the youngest male to ever win the race.

== Early life ==
Ghirmay was born on 14 November 1995 in Kisadeka, a village 115 km (71 mi) from the Eritrean capital Asmara. His talent was spotted by a physical education teacher who saw him running with his friends and encouraged him to take up running. Ghirmay was initially concerned this would affect his academics but was convinced he could follow in the footsteps of Zersenay Tadese and manage both. His father was opposed to his running but success on the track fixed this concern.

== Running career ==
Ghirmay placed 7th at the 2013 IAAF World Cross Country Championships Junior men's race in Bydgoszcz, Poland. He also placed 7th at the 2014 IAAF World Half Marathon Championships senior men's race in Copenhagen, Denmark.

On 22 August 2015, Ghirmay unexpectedly won the marathon race at the 2015 World Championships in Athletics, becoming the youngest ever world marathon winner, at the age of 19. He took the lead at the 36 km mark. As he entered Beijing National Stadium for the final lap, he was in a close race with Ethiopian Yemane Tsegay. Ghirmay was able to produce one final sprint in the last 100 m to outlast his competitor. He was running in only his fourth marathon.

Ghirmay finished in fourth place at the 2016 London Marathon, achieving a personal best time of 2:07:46.

Going into the 2016 Olympics, Ghirmay, by virtue of his world championship, was considered a medal contender in the Marathon event. He placed fourth.

On 6 November 2016, Ghirmay was the top men's finisher at the New York City Marathon, becoming the youngest male to ever win the race.

Personal bests
Race	Time	Place	Date
10,000 metres (track)	28:33.37	Hengelo (Blankers-Koen Stadion)	27 May 2012
10 kilometres (road)	28:21	Gothenburg	18 May 2014
15 kilometres	42:43	Gothenburg	18 May 2014
20 kilometres	57:07	Copenhagen	29 March 2014
Half marathon	1:00:01	Keren	5 January 2014
25 kilometres	1:13:42	Chicago	12 October 2014
30 kilometres	1:28:13	London	24 April 2016
Marathon	2:05:34	Sevilla	20 February 2022
