= Beraki Beyene =

Eritrean long-distance runner

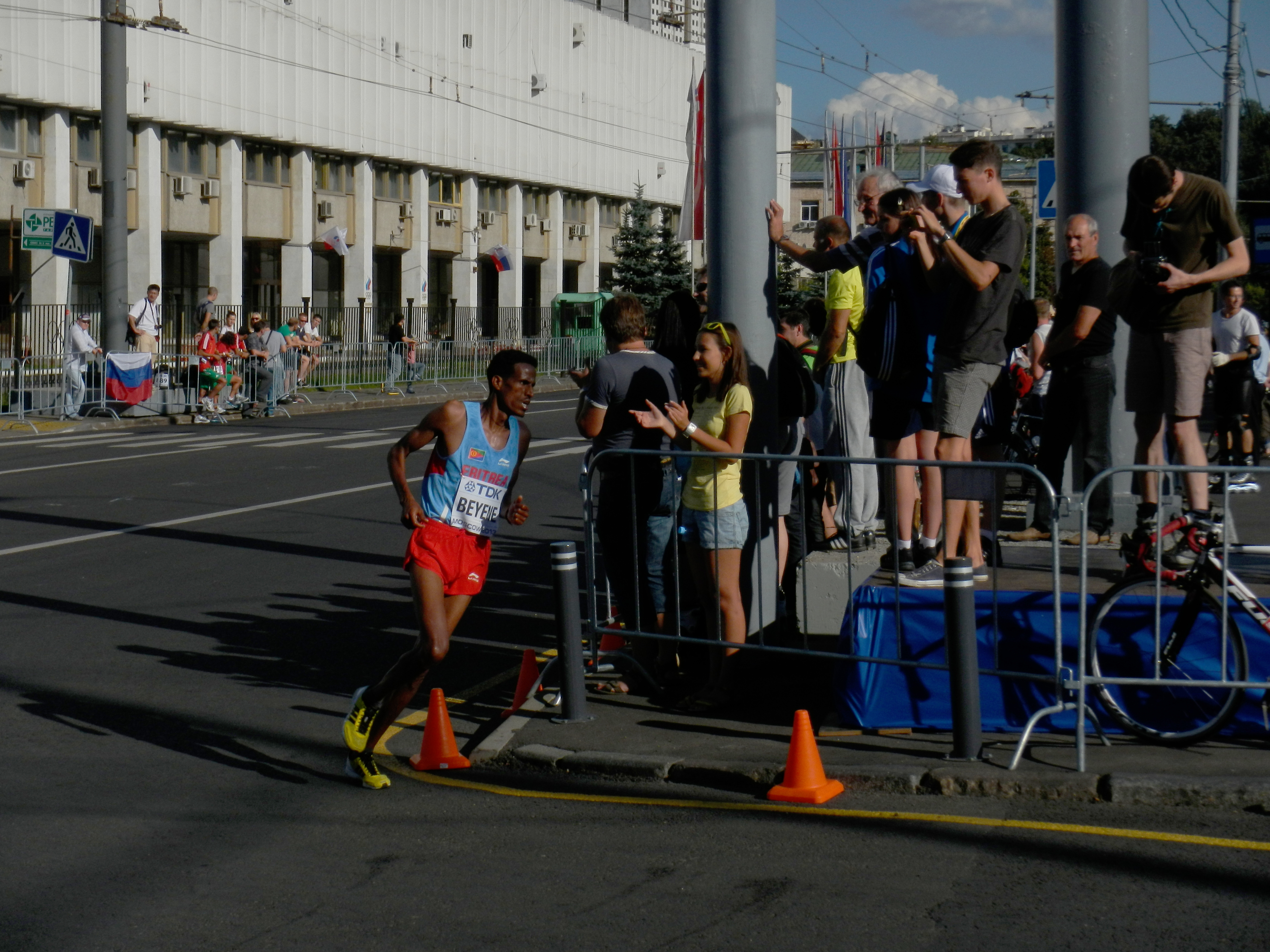

Personal information
- Born: 6 February 1980 (age 46)

Sport
- Country: Eritrea
- Sport: Track and field
- Event: Marathon

Beraki Beyene (born 6 February 1980) is an Eritrean long-distance runner who specialises in the marathon. He competed in the marathon event at the 2015 World Championships in Athletics in Beijing, China.
