= Jackson Kiprop =

Ugandan long-distance runner

Personal information
- Born: 20 October 1986 (age 39)

Sport
- Country: Uganda
- Sport: Track and field
- Event: Marathon

Jackson Kiprop (born 20 October 1986) is a Ugandan long-distance runner who specialises in the marathon. He competed in the marathon event at the 2015 World Championships in Athletics in Beijing, China.
