= 2015 World Championships in Athletics – Men's 3000 metres steeplechase =

Men's 3000 metres steeplechase at the 2015 World Championships
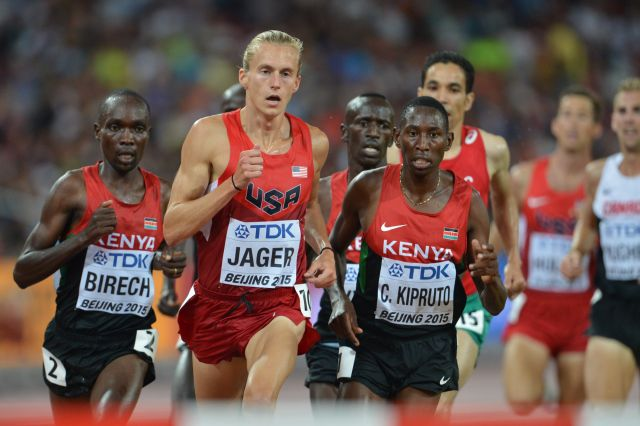
- Venue: Beijing National Stadium
- Dates: 22 August (heats); 24 August (final)
- Competitors: 39 from 21 nations
- Winning time: 8:11.28

Medalists
gold medal	Ezekiel Kemboi	Kenya
silver medal	Conseslus Kipruto	Kenya
bronze medal	Brimin Kipruto	Kenya

The men's 3000 metres steeplechase at the 2015 World Championships in Athletics was held at the Beijing National Stadium on 22 and 24 August.

== Summary ==
The Kenyan dominance of this event is well noted. Coming off the race in Monaco, running the #3 non-Kenyan time in history even after falling over the last barrier and losing three to five seconds, Evan Jager had the confidence to run with the Kenyans at the front of the pack. Still, three of the Kenyans in this race were ahead of him on that list. This was a strategic race, with the Kenyan team asserting dominance in front of the pack but not running away from the field. Non-team player, multi-defending champion Ezekiel Kemboi didn't share the lead duties, instead spending the entire first six laps on the rail about 2-3 runners behind the lead. At the bell, Jager took the lead and tried to launch his sprint. As the race accelerated, only the four Kenyans and Brahim Taleb were able to stay at the front. Conseslus Kipruto and Jairus Kipchoge Birech passed Jager a step before the barrier at the beginning of the backstretch. After landing that barrier, defending champion Kemboi took off sprinting passing Jager on the inside and his compatriots on the outside before taking the next barrier clearly in the lead. After opening up a gap through the water jump, Conseslus came back swinging wide on the home stretch looking like he was going to run past Kemboi. Instead Conseslus had to noticeably adjust his stride, taking the final barrier awkwardly. Kemboi took it smoothly and sprinted home to victory, drifting out only to lane 3 this time in celebration. Behind them, Birech took his final barrier awkwardly and Brimin Kipruto caught him for the bronze medal.

Now 33 years old, Ezekiel Kemboi became the first person to win an event in the world championships four times in a row. In addition to the four championships in a row, he took the silver medal in the three World Championships before that, silver or gold seven times in a row. Add to that, a pair of Olympic gold medals in the same time frame. And the scenario remains the same, the final lap backstretch burst and a Kipruto struggling over the last barrier while trying to catch up.

== Records ==
Prior to the competition, the records were as follows:

World record	Saif Saaeed Shaheen (QAT)	7:53.63	Brussels, Belgium	3 September 2004
Championship record	Ezekiel Kemboi (KEN)	8:00.43	Berlin, Germany	18 August 2009
World Leading	Jairus Kipchoge Birech (KEN)	7:58.83	Saint-Denis, France	4 July 2015
African record	Brimin Kiprop Kipruto (KEN)	7:53.64	Fontvieille, Monaco	22 July 2011
Asian record	Saif Saaeed Shaheen (QAT)	7:53.63	Brussels, Belgium	3 September 2004
North, Central American and Caribbean record	Evan Jager (USA)	8:00.45	Saint-Denis, France	4 July 2015
South American record	Wander do Prado Moura (BRA)	8:14.41	Mar del Plata, Argentina	22 March 1995
European record	Mahiedine Mekhissi-Benabbad (FRA)	8:00.09	Saint-Denis, France	6 July 2013
Oceanian record	Peter Renner (NZL)	8:14.05	Koblenz, West Germany	29 August 1984

== Qualification standards ==
Entry standards
8:28.00

== Schedule ==
Date	Time	Round
22 August 2015	10:25	Heats
24 August 2015	21:15	Final

All times are local times (UTC+8)

== Results ==
KEY:	Q	Qualified	q	Fastest non-qualifiers	NR	National record	PB	Personal best	SB	Seasonal best

=== Heats ===
Qualification: Best 3 (Q) and next 6 fastest (q) qualify for the next round.

Rank	Heat	Name	Nationality	Time	Notes
1	3	Ezekiel Kemboi	Kenya	8:24.75	Q
2	3	Brahim Taleb	Morocco	8:24.84	Q
3	3	Brimin Kipruto	Kenya	8:24.95	Q
4	3	Krystian Zalewski	Poland	8:25.10	q
5	3	Daniel Huling	United States	8:25.34	q
6	3	Hailemariyam Amare	Ethiopia	8:25.36	q
7	2	Jairus Kipchoge Birech	Kenya	8:25.77	Q
8	2	Bilal Tabti	Algeria	8:26.99	Q
9	2	Donald Cabral	United States	8:27.33	Q
10	2	Tolosa Nurgi	Ethiopia	8:27.65	q
11	2	Hamid Ezzine	Morocco	8:29.26	q
12	3	Hicham Bouchicha	Algeria	8:30.07	q
13	2	Dikotsi Lekopa	South Africa	8:37.43	
14	2	Fernando Carro	Spain	8:38.05	
15	2	John Kibet Koech	Bahrain	8:38.62	
16	2	Ilgizar Safiullin	Russia	8:39.58	
17	1	Conseslus Kipruto	Kenya	8:41.41	Q
18	1	Evan Jager	United States	8:41.51	Q
19	1	Matthew Hughes	Canada	8:41.52	Q
20	1	Yoann Kowal	France	8:41.65	
21	1	Amor Ben Yahia	Tunisia	8:43.11	
22	3	Taylor Milne	Canada	8:43.47	
23	3	Jamel Chatbi	Italy	8:47.30	
24	1	Tafese Seboka	Ethiopia	8:47.73	
25	1	Hicham Sigueni	Morocco	8:49.73	
26	1	Sebastián Martos	Spain	8:50.20	
27	1	Nikolay Chavkin	Russia	8:51.22	
28	1	Abdelhamid Zerrifi	Algeria	8:51.89	
29	2	Alex Genest	Canada	8:52.49	
30	3	Halil Akkaş	Turkey	8:54.04	
31	1	Benjamin Kiplagat	Uganda	8:54.46	
32	3	Tumisang Monnatlala	South Africa	8:55.25	
33	1	James Nipperess	Australia	8:56.01	
34	2	Kaur Kivistik	Estonia	8:56.36	
35	1	Mitko Tsenov	Bulgaria	9:02.72	
36	2	Gerald Giraldo	Colombia	9:16.47	
37	3	Hashim Salah Mohamed	Qatar	9:17.35	
38	2	Sapolai Yao	Papua New Guinea	9:51.09	
	3	Roberto Aláiz	Spain	DNF	
	1	Nelson Cherutich	Bahrain	DNS	
	2	Mohamed Ismail Ibrahim	Djibouti	DNS	
	3	Jeroen D'Hoedt	Belgium	DNS	

=== Final ===
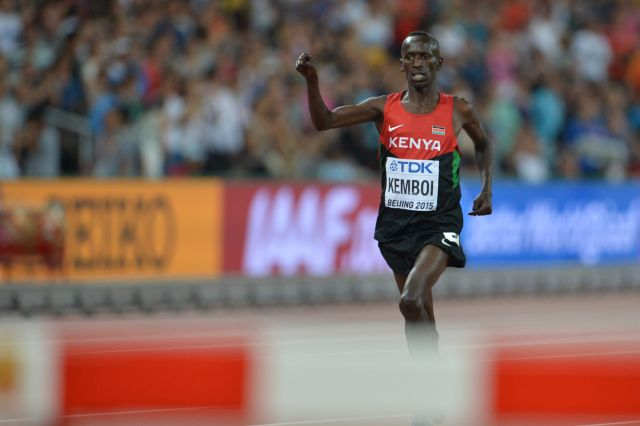
Kemboi finishing

The final was started at 21:15.

Rank	Name	Nationality	Time	Notes
1st place, gold medalist(s)	Ezekiel Kemboi	Kenya	8:11.28	
2nd place, silver medalist(s)	Conseslus Kipruto	Kenya	8:12.38	
3rd place, bronze medalist(s)	Brimin Kipruto	Kenya	8:12.54	
4	Jairus Kipchoge Birech	Kenya	8:12.62	
5	Daniel Huling	United States	8:14.39	
6	Evan Jager	United States	8:15.47	
7	Brahim Taleb	Morocco	8:17.73	
8	Matthew Hughes	Canada	8:18.63	SB
9	Krystian Zalewski	Poland	8:21.22	SB
10	Donald Cabral	United States	8:24.94	
11	Hamid Ezzine	Morocco	8:25.72	
12	Hailemariyam Amare	Ethiopia	8:26.19	
13	Bilal Tabti	Algeria	8:29.04	
14	Hicham Bouchicha	Algeria	8:33.79	
15	Tolosa Nurgi	Ethiopia	8:44.81	
