= Paul Tanui =

Kenyan long-distance runner

Medal record

Men's athletics

Representing Kenya

Olympic Games
Silver medal – second place	2016 Rio de Janeiro	10,000 m

World Championships
Bronze medal – third place	2013 Moscow	10,000 m
Bronze medal – third place	2015 Beijing	10,000 m
Bronze medal – third place	2017 London	10,000 m

World Cross Country Championships
Silver medal – second place	2011 Punta Umbría	Men's race

Paul Kipng'etich Tanui (born 22 December 1990) is a Kenyan long-distance runner. He won the 2010 Kenyan cross country title and went on to take the silver medal at the 2011 IAAF World Cross Country Championships.

He represented Kenya over 10,000 metres at the 2011 World Championships in Athletics and took ninth place. He also competed in the 2013 Moscow World Championships and took the bronze medal in the same event. In 2016, he won the silver medal in the men's 10,000m at the 2016 Olympics.

He has a personal best of 26:49.41 minutes for that event.

== Career ==
Hailing from Nakuru, Kenya, Paul began competing in major domestic cross country races in the 2007–2008 season: in two of the junior races at the KCB/Athletics Kenya Cross Country meetings he made the top eight, and he went on to finish in sixth in the junior race at the Kenya National Cross Country Championships in 2008. He competed on the track at the provincial level in June and ran a time of 14:19.76 for second place in the 5000 metres behind Evans Mayoyo.

Tanui improved further the following season, finishing fourth in the junior race in Meru, winning at the Nyanza South Provincial Championships, then taking second place in the junior race at the 2009 Kenya Championships, behind John Kemboi. This gave him automatic selection for the Kenyan team at the 2009 IAAF World Cross Country Championships. He came close to making the podium but ended up in fourth despite recording the same time as bronze medallist Moses Kibet. Despite not reaching the top three, he managed to help the Kenyan junior men to the team gold that year.

After moving to Fukuoka, Japan in mid-2009 to improve his running, the 2010 season proved to be another step up for Tanui. At the beginning of the year he took part in the New Year Ekiden for the Kyudenko Corporation, where he ran the fastest in his stage. Competing in the men's senior race at the Kenya Championships for the first time, Tanui surprised his competitors with a significant victory. He defeated a number of established runners to win the men's title by a margin of over thirty seconds. With former champions Kenenisa Bekele and Zersenay Tadese not competing at the 2010 IAAF World Cross Country Championships, Tanui was suggested as a tentative favourite for the competition. He failed to carry over his strong domestic form to the world stage, but the 19-year-old still managed to reach the top ten in his first attempt at the senior level, finishing eighth and helping Kenya to the team gold.

Seventh place at the 2011 Kenyan trials meant that he was not selected for the world event, but a dispute between Leonard Komon and Athletics Kenya saw Tanui drafted in as a late replacement. He went on to finish the 2011 IAAF World Cross Country Championships as his nation's best performer by taking the silver medal, two seconds behind race winner Imane Merga. Tanui also led the Kenyans to the team gold medal. A third-place finish at the Trofeo Alàsport meet behind Merga and Caleb Ndiku brought his cross country season to a close. He ran a series of track bests that year starting with 10,000 metres run of 26:50.63 minutes for fourth place at the Prefontaine Classic, a time of 13:04.65 min for the 5000 m in Barcelona and then 3000 metres best of 7:50.88 min in Arzana. As one of the fastest Kenyans over 10,000 m that year, he was chosen to compete in that event at the 2011 World Championships in Athletics. However, he ran a minute slower than his season's best in the event final and finished ninth overall.

At the beginning of 2012, he beat Geoffrey Kipsang in a sprint finish to win the men's race at the Cross Internacional Juan Muguerza and was runner-up at the Trofeo Alasport.

== Personal bests ==
Event	Time (m:s)	Venue	Date
3000 m	7:46.61	Saint-Denis, France	27 August 2016
5000 m	12:58.69	Rome, Italy	4 June 2015
10,000 m	26:49.41	Eugene, United States	30 May 2014

- All information taken from IAAF profile.

== Competition record ==
Year	Competition	Venue	Position	Event	Notes
2009	World Cross Country Championships	Amman, Jordan	4th	Junior race	Individual
2009	World Cross Country Championships	Amman, Jordan	1st	Junior race	Team
2010	World Cross Country Championships	Bydgoszcz, Poland	8th	Senior race	Individual
2010	World Cross Country Championships	Bydgoszcz, Poland	1st	Senior race	Team
2011	World Cross Country Championships	Punta Umbría, Spain	2nd	Senior race	Individual
2011	World Cross Country Championships	Punta Umbría, Spain	1st	Senior race	Team
2011	World Championships	Daegu, South Korea	9th	10,000 m	27:54.03
2013	World Championships	Moscow, Russia	3rd	10,000 m	27:22.61
2015	World Championships	Beijing, China	3rd	10,000 m	27:02.83
2016	Olympic Games	Rio de Janeiro, Brazil	2nd	10,000 m	27:05.64
2017	World Championships	London, United Kingdom	3rd	10,000 m	26:50.60
2019	African Games	Rabat, Morocco	–	10,000 m	DNF
