= 2015 World Championships in Athletics – Men's 10,000 metres =

Marathon Highest Achiever

Men's 10,000 metres at the 2015 World Championships
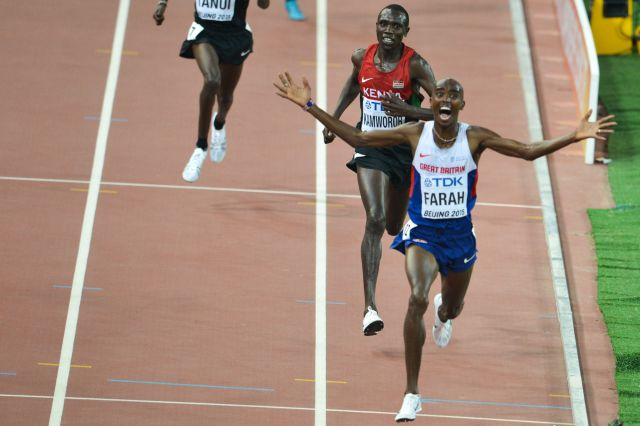
- Victorious Mo Farah
- Venue: Beijing National Stadium
- Dates: 22 August
- Competitors: 27 from 14 nations
- Winning time: 27:01.13

Medalists
gold medal	Mo Farah	Great Britain
silver medal	Geoffrey Kipsang	Kenya
bronze medal	Paul Tanui	Kenya

The men's 10,000 metres at the 2015 World Championships in Athletics was held at the Beijing National Stadium on 22 August.

== Summary ==
While Ethiopians Haile Gebrselassie, Kenenisa Bekele and on the women's side Tirunesh Dibaba had all done it before, Mo Farah had the opportunity to be the first non-Ethiopian runner to defend a world 10,000 metres championship. The Kenyan triumvirate of Geoffrey Kipsang Kamworor, Paul Kipngetich Tanui and Bedan Karoki Muchiri took the race out, multiple 64 second laps breaking the race apart to the point that there were only two remaining stragglers, Farah and his American training partner Galen Rupp. Farah, Rupp and Tanui were all returning from top 5 finishes two years earlier. As the pace dropped, Farah briefly showed his intent to win with 3200, 1500 and 1200 to go, but each time Farah poked into the lead the Kenyan team quickly scrambled to retake the lead. Then with 500 metres to go to the finish, Farah boldly launched his long assault for the finish. In championship races, long sprints to the finish usually lead to defeat as the more sprint inclined racers are able to run down the breakaway near the finish, but Farah held the lead as the three, then two Kenyan rivals jockeyed for position to catch him. In the final turn as he was maneuvering through traffic, Kipsang got close enough to clip Farah's heels, with Farah stumbling and almost falling. Farah stayed on his feet with Kipsang close behind, then Tanui managed to pull even with Kipsang through the final turn. Coming into the final straight, World Cross Country champion Kipsang looked like he would be able to swing around Farah to victory, but a determined Farah instead accelerated pulling away to a clear win, celebrating as he crossed the finish line. Farah's final lap time was 54.15. For the second time in a row, Tanui found himself in bronze medal position.

== Records ==
Prior to the competition, the records were as follows:

World record	Kenenisa Bekele (ETH)	26:17.53	Brussels, Belgium	26 August 2005
Championship record	Kenenisa Bekele (ETH)	26:46.31	Berlin, Germany	17 August 2009
World Leading	Mo Farah (GBR)	26:50.97	Eugene, OR, United States	29 May 2015
African Record	Kenenisa Bekele (ETH)	26:17.53	Brussels, Belgium	26 August 2005
Asian Record	Ahmad Hassan Abdullah (QAT)	26:38.76	Brussels, Belgium	5 September 2003
North, Central American and Caribbean record	Galen Rupp (USA)	26:44.36	Eugene, OR, United States	30 May 2014
South American Record	Marilson dos Santos (BRA)	27:28.12	Neerpelt, Belgium	2 June 2007
European Record	Mo Farah (GBR)	26:46.57	Eugene, OR, United States	3 June 2011
Oceanian record	Ben St Lawrence (AUS)	27:24.95	Palo Alto, CA, United States	1 May 2011

== Qualification standards ==
Entry standards
27:45.00

== Schedule ==
Date	Time	Round
22 August 2015	20:50	Final

All times are local times (UTC+8)

== Results ==
The race was started at 20:50.

Rank	Name	Nationality	Time	Notes
1st place, gold medalist(s)	Mo Farah	Great Britain & N.I.	27:01.13	
2nd place, silver medalist(s)	Geoffrey Kipsang	Kenya	27:01.76	
3rd place, bronze medalist(s)	Paul Tanui	Kenya	27:02.83	
4	Bedan Karoki	Kenya	27:04.77	SB
5	Galen Rupp	United States	27:08.91	SB
6	Abrar Osman	Eritrea	27:43.21	
7	Ali Kaya	Turkey	27:43.69	
8	Timothy Toroitich	Uganda	27:44.90	
9	Joshua Kiprui Cheptegei	Uganda	27:48.89	
10	Muktar Edris	Ethiopia	27:54.47	
11	Mosinet Geremew	Ethiopia	28:07.50	
12	El Hassan El-Abbassi	Bahrain	28:12.57	
13	Nguse Tesfaldet	Eritrea	28:14.72	
14	Cameron Levins	Canada	28:15.19	
15	Hassan Mead	United States	28:16.30	
16	Shadrack Kipchirchir	United States	28:16.30	SB
17	Arne Gabius	Germany	28:24.47	
18	Tetsuya Yoroizaka	Japan	28:25.77	
19	Teklemariam Medhin	Eritrea	28:39.26	SB
20	Stephen Mokoka	South Africa	28:47.40	
21	Aweke Ayalew	Bahrain	29:14.55	PB
22	Kenta Murayama	Japan	29:50.22	
23	Yuta Shitara	Japan	30:08.35	
	Bashir Abdi	Belgium	DNF	
	Ismail Juma	Tanzania	DNF	
	Imane Merga	Ethiopia	DNF	
	Moses Kibet	Uganda	DNF	
