= Saudi Arabia at the World Athletics Championships =

- Flag of Saudi Arabia
- WA code: KSA
- Medals: Gold 0 Silver 0 Bronze 1 Total 1

World Athletics Championships appearances (overview)
- 1991; 1993; 1995; 1997; 1999; 2001; 2003; 2005; 2007; 2009; 2011; 2013; 2015; 2017; 2019; 2022; 2023; 2025

Saudi Arabia has competed in every edition of the World Athletics Championships since 1991, with their major success being a bronze medal achieved in 1995 by Sa’ed Shaddad Al-Asmari in the men's 3000 meters steeplechase. No other medal has been won by a saudi athlete since then, eventhough they have achieved some other finalists places.

== Medalists ==
Medal	Name	Year	Event
Bronze	Saad Al-Asmari	1995 Gothenburg	Men's 3000 meters steeplechase

=== By event ===
Event	Gold	Silver	Bronze	Total
3000 meters steeplechase	0	0	1	1
Totals (1 entries)	0	0	1	1

=== By gender ===
Gender	Gold	Silver	Bronze	Total
Men	0	0	1	1
Women	0	0	0	0

== See also ==
- Saudi Arabia at the Olympics
- Saudi Arabia at the Paralympics
