= Saudi Arabia at the 2025 World Athletics Championships =

- Flag of Saudi Arabia
- WA code: KSA

in Tokyo, Japan 13 September 2025 – 21 September 2025
- Competitors: 5 (4 men and 1 woman)
- Medals: Gold 0 Silver 0 Bronze 0 Total 0

World Athletics Championships appearances (overview)
- 1991; 1993; 1995; 1997; 1999; 2001; 2003; 2005; 2007; 2009; 2011; 2013; 2015; 2017; 2019; 2022; 2023; 2025

Saudi Arabia competed at the 2025 World Athletics Championships in Tokyo, Japan, from 13 to 21 September 2025.

== Results ==
Saudi Arabia entered 5 athletes to the championships: 1 woman and 4 men.

Key

- Q = Qualified for the next round
- q = Qualified for the next round as a fastest loser or, in field events, by position without achieving the qualifying target
- NR = National record
- PB = Personal best
- SB = Season best
- N/A = Round not applicable for the event

=== Men ===
Track and road events

Athlete	Event	Heat		Semifinal		Final	
Athlete	Event	Result	Rank	Result	Rank	Result	Rank
Abdulaziz Abdui Atafi	200 metres	20.66	8	Did not advance			

Field events

Athlete	Event	Qualification		Final	
Athlete	Event	Distance	Position	Distance	Position
Hussain Asim Al-Hizam	Pole vault	5.70	17	Did not advance	
Sami Bakheet	Triple jump	16.26	26	Did not advance	
Mohammed Tolo	Shot put	18.08	32	Did not advance	

=== Women ===
Track and road events

Athlete	Event	Heat		Semifinal		Final	
Athlete	Event	Result	Rank	Result	Rank	Result	Rank
Lujain Ibrahim Al-Humaid	100 metres	12.68	9	Did not advance			
