= United States at the 2015 World Championships in Athletics =

- WA code: USA
- National federation: USA Track & Field
- Website: www.usatf.org

in Beijing
- Competitors: 130
- Medals Ranked 3rd: Gold 6 Silver 6 Bronze 6 Total 18

World Championships in Athletics appearances (overview)
- 1976; 1980; 1983; 1987; 1991; 1993; 1995; 1997; 1999; 2001; 2003; 2005; 2007; 2009; 2011; 2013; 2015; 2017; 2019; 2022; 2023; 2025

The United States of America competed at the 2015 World Championships in Athletics from August 22 to August 30 in Beijing, China. The membership of the team was selected at the 2015 USA Outdoor Track and Field Championships. However, membership on the team was subject to the athlete achieving a qualification standard. In addition, champions from the previous World Championships and the 2014 IAAF Diamond League receive an automatic bye. An automatic entry is also available to an Area Champion, the IAAF definition of an Area essentially being the specified continental areas of the world. The United States is part of the North American, Central American and Caribbean Athletic Association, which held its championship August 7–9, 2015 in San José, Costa Rica where 20 athletes qualified. The deadline for entries was August 10. The final team membership as submitted to the IAAF was announced on August 10, 2015.

== Medalists ==
The following competitors from United States won medals at the Championships

Medal	Athlete	Event	Date
Gold	Joe Kovacs	Shot put	August 23
Gold	Christian Taylor	Triple jump	August 27
Gold	Allyson Felix	400 meters	August 27
Gold	Tianna Bartoletta	Long jump	August 28
Gold	Ashton Eaton	Decathlon	August 29
Gold	LaShawn Merritt; David Verburg; Tony McQuay; Bryshon Nellum; Kyle Clemons*; Vernon Norwood	4 × 400 metres relay	August 30
Silver	Justin Gatlin	100 metres	August 23
Silver	Shamier Little	400 hurdles	August 26
Silver	LaShawn Merritt	400 meters	August 26
Silver	Justin Gatlin	200 metres	August 27
Silver	Allyson Felix; English Gardner; Jenna Prandini; Jasmine Todd	4 × 100 metres relay	August 29
Silver	Allyson Felix; Sanya Richards-Ross; Natasha Hastings; Francena McCorory; Phyllis Francis; Jessica Beard	4 × 400 metres relay	August 30
Bronze	Michelle Carter	Shot put	August 22
Bronze	Trayvon Bromell	100 metres	August 23
Bronze	Emily Infeld	10,000 metres	August 24
Bronze	Tori Bowie	100 metres	August 24
Bronze	Cassandra Tate	400 hurdles	August 26
Bronze	Aries Merritt	110 hurdles	August 28

== Results ==
=== Men ===
Track and road events

Athlete	Event	Heat		Semifinal		Final	
Athlete	Event	Result	Rank	Result	Rank	Result	Rank
Trayvon Bromell	100 metres	9.91	2 Q	9.99	7 q	9.92	3rd place, bronze medalist(s)
Justin Gatlin	100 metres	9.83	1 Q	9.77	1 Q	9.80	2nd place, silver medalist(s)
Tyson Gay	100 metres	10.11	19 Q	9.96	=3 Q	10.00	6
Mike Rodgers	100 metres	9.97	6 Q	9.86 SB	2 Q	9.94	5
Justin Gatlin	200 metres	20.19	7 Q	19.87	1 Q	19.74	2nd place, silver medalist(s)
Wallace Spearmon	200 metres	DNS		Did not advance			
Isiah Young	200 metres	20.51	=31	Did not advance			
LaShawn Merritt	400 metres	44.51	7 Q	44.34 SB	5 Q	43.65 PB	2nd place, silver medalist(s)
Bryshon Nellum	400 metres	44.65 PB	12 Q	44.77	=12	Did not advance	
Vernon Norwood	400 metres	45.53	33 Q	45.07	=18	Did not advance	
David Verburg	400 metres	44.43	5 Q	44.71	10	Did not advance	
Casimir Loxsom	800 metres	1:48.97	38	Did not advance			
Clayton Murphy	800 metres	1:48.08	26 Q	1:46.28	12	Did not advance	
Erik Sowinski	800 metres	1:46.63	10 q	1:47.16	13	Did not advance	
Robby Andrews	1500 metres	3:38.52	7 q	3:35.88	6 q	3:38.29	11
Matthew Centrowitz Jr.	1500 metres	3:43.17	25 Q	3:43.97	16 Q	3:36.13	8
Leonel Manzano	1500 metres	3:39.22	13 Q	3:44.28	17 Q	3:37.26	10
Ryan Hill	5000 metres	13:19.57	6 q	—N/a		13:55.10	7
Galen Rupp	5000 metres	13:20.78	8 q	—N/a		13:53.90	5
Ben True	5000 metres	13:45.09	17 Q	—N/a		13:54.07	6
Shadrack Kipchirchir	10,000 metres	—N/a				28:16.30 SB	16
Hassan Mead	10,000 metres	—N/a				28:16.30	15
Galen Rupp	10,000 metres	—N/a				27:08.91 SB	5
Ian Burrell	Marathon	—N/a				2:23:17 SB	25
Jeffrey Eggleston	Marathon	—N/a				DNF	
Scott Smith	Marathon	—N/a				2:23:53 SB	28
Ronnie Ash	110 metres hurdles	DSQ		Did not advance			
Aleec Harris	110 metres hurdles	13.41	=9 Q	13.29	9	Did not advance	
Aries Merritt	110 metres hurdles	13.25	2 Q	13.08 SB	1 Q	13.04 SB	3rd place, bronze medalist(s)
David Oliver	110 metres hurdles	13.15	1 Q	13.17	=6 Q	13.33	7
Kerron Clement	400 metres hurdles	48.75	3 Q	48.50	7 Q	48.18 SB	4
Johnny Dutch	400 metres hurdles	48.97	9 Q	49.74	12	Did not advance	
Bershawn Jackson	400 metres hurdles	50.14	34	Did not advance			
Michael Tinsley	400 metres hurdles	48.91	7 Q	48.47	6 Q	50.02	8
Donn Cabral	3000 metres steeplechase	8:27.33	9 Q	—N/a		8:24.94	10
Daniel Huling	3000 metres steeplechase	8:25.34	5 Q	—N/a		8:14.39	5
Evan Jager	3000 metres steeplechase	8:41.51	18 Q	—N/a		8:15.37	6
Trayvon Bromell; Justin Gatlin; Tyson Gay; Mike Rodgers	4 × 100 metres relay	37.91	3 Q	—N/a		DSQ	
Tony McQuay; LaShawn Merritt; Bryshon Nellum; David Verburg; Vernon Norwood*; Kyle Clemons*	4 × 400 metres relay	2:58.13 WL	1 Q	—N/a		2:57.82 WL	1st place, gold medalist(s)
John Nunn	50 kilometres walk	—N/a				4:09.44 SB	37

Field events

Athlete	Event	Qualification		Final	
Athlete	Event	Distance	Position	Distance	Position
JaCorian Duffield	High jump	2.29	16	Did not advance	
Erik Kynard	High jump	2.29	=10 q	2.25	8
Jesse Williams	High jump	2.26	22	Did not advance	
Jacob Blankenship	Pole vault	5.55	27	Did not advance	
Sam Kendricks	Pole vault	5.70	=1 Q	5.65	=9
Brad Walker	Pole vault	5.65	20	Did not advance	
Marquis Dendy	Long jump	7.78	21	Did not advance	
Mike Hartfield	Long jump	8.13	3 q	NM	
Jeff Henderson	Long jump	8.36	1 Q	7.95	9
Will Claye	Triple jump	16.41	19	Did not advance	
Omar Craddock	Triple jump	17.01	4 Q	17.37	4
Marquis Dendy	Triple jump	16.73	13	Did not advance	
Christian Taylor	Triple jump	17.28	2 Q	18.21 WL, AR	1st place, gold medalist(s)
Christian Cantwell	Shot put	20.63	5 q	DNS	
Jordan Clarke	Shot put	19.89	13	Did not advance	
Reese Hoffa	Shot put	20.75	3 Q	21.00	5
Joe Kovacs	Shot put	21.36	1 Q	21.93	1st place, gold medalist(s)
Rodney Brown	Discus throw	NM		Did not advance	
Jared Schuurmans	Discus throw	57.74	29	Did not advance	
Russell Winger	Discus throw	58.69	26	Did not advance	
Sam Crouser	Javelin throw	73.88	31	Did not advance	
Riley Dolezal	Javelin throw	77.64	24	Did not advance	
Sean Furey	Javelin throw	75.01	29	Did not advance	
Kibwe Johnson	Hammer throw	73.75	16	Did not advance	
A. G. Kruger	Hammer throw	71.56	24	Did not advance	
Conor McCullough	Hammer throw	74.31	13	Did not advance	

Combined events – Decathlon

Athlete	Event	100 m	LJ	SP	HJ	400 m	110H	DT	PV	JT	1500 m	Final	Rank
Ashton Eaton	Result	10.23 CDB	7.88	14.52	2.01	45.00 WDB	13.69	43.34	5.20	63.63 SB	4:17.52 SB	9045 WR	1st place, gold medalist(s)
Ashton Eaton	Points	1040	1030	760	813	1060	1015	733	972	793	829	9045 WR	1st place, gold medalist(s)
Trey Hardee	Result	10.56	7.30	10.20	DNS	—N/a						DNF	
Trey Hardee	Points	961	886	498	—N/a							DNF	
Jeremy Taiwo	Result	11.06	7.15	14.18	2.10	47.94	14.81	41.01	DNS	—N/a		DNF	
Jeremy Taiwo	Points	847	850	739	896	912	873	685	—N/a			DNF	
Zachery Ziemek	Result	10.81	7.57 SB	13.38	2.04	49.89 PB	15.29	44.19	5.20	56.50 SB	4:56.66 PB	8006	15
Zachery Ziemek	Points	903	952	690	840	820	815	750	972	685	579	8006	15

=== Women ===
Track and road events

Athlete	Event	Heat		Semifinal		Final	
Athlete	Event	Result	Rank	Result	Rank	Result	Rank
Tori Bowie	100 metres	10.88	=1 Q	10.87	3 Q	10.86	3rd place, bronze medalist(s)
English Gardner	100 metres	11.16	=15 Q	11.13	=14	Did not advance	
Jasmine Todd	100 metres	11.29	=23 Q	11.21	=20	Did not advance	
Candyce McGrone	200 metres	22.45	2 Q	22.26	3 Q	22.01 PB	4
Jenna Prandini	200 metres	22.95	=15 Q	22.87	=13	Did not advance	
Jeneba Tarmoh	200 metres	22.79	=8 Q	22.30	4 Q	22.31	6
Allyson Felix	400 metres	50.60	7 Q	49.89 SB	1 Q	49.26 WL	1st place, gold medalist(s)
Phyllis Francis	400 metres	50.52 SB	4 Q	50.50 SB	7 q	50.51	7
Natasha Hastings	400 metres	51.25	16 Q	51.33	16	Did not advance	
Brenda Martinez	800 metres	2:00.54	15 Q	2:00.27	19	Did not advance	
Alysia Montaño	800 metres	2:09.57	41	Did not advance			
Molly Beckwith-Ludlow	800 metres	2:00.70	=17 q	2:00.43	21	Did not advance	
Kerri Gallagher	1500 metres	4:06.34	16 q	4:17.63	19	Did not advance	
Lauren Johnson	1500 metres	4:05.79	11 q	4:10.01	8	Did not advance	
Shannon Rowbury	1500 metres	4:05.66	8 Q	4:16.64	16 Q	4:12.39	7
Jennifer Simpson	1500 metres	4:10.91	26 Q	4:08.20	5 Q	4:16.28	11
Abbey D'Agostino	5000 metres	16:16.47	23	—N/a		Did not advance	
Marielle Hall	5000 metres	16:06.60	21	—N/a		Did not advance	
Nicole Tully	5000 metres	15:41.03	14 q	—N/a		15:27.42	13
Shalane Flanagan	10,000 metres	—N/a				31:46.23	6
Molly Huddle	10,000 metres	—N/a				31:43.58	4
Emily Infeld	10,000 metres	—N/a				31:43.49	3rd place, bronze medalist(s)
Serena Burla	Marathon	—N/a				2:31:06	10
Esther Erb	Marathon	—N/a				2:38:15	24
Heather Lieberg	Marathon	—N/a				DNF	
Dawn Harper-Nelson	100 metres hurdles	12.79	5 Q	DNF		Did not advance	
Kendra Harrison	100 metres hurdles	12.90	11 Q	DSQ		Did not advance	
Sharika Nelvis	100 metres hurdles	12.93	=13 Q	12.59	2 Q	13.06	8
Brianna Rollins	100 metres hurdles	12.67	1 Q	12.71	5 Q	12.67	4
Kori Carter	400 metres hurdles	56.22	21 Q	DNF		Did not advance	
Shamier Little	400 metres hurdles	56.47	24 Q	54.86	8 q	53.94	2nd place, silver medalist(s)
Cassandra Tate	400 metres hurdles	54.27	1 Q	54.33	2 Q	54.02	3rd place, bronze medalist(s)
Emma Coburn	3000 metres steeplechase	9:27.19	7 Q	—N/a		9:21.78	5
Stephanie Garcia	3000 metres steeplechase	9:29.34	14 Q	—N/a		9:31.06	9
Colleen Quigley	3000 metres steeplechase	9:29.09	13 q	—N/a		9:34.29	12
Allyson Felix; English Gardner; Jenna Prandini; Jasmine Todd	4 × 100 metres relay	42.00	2 Q	—N/a		41.68 SB	2nd place, silver medalist(s)
Allyson Felix; Natasha Hastings; Francena McCorory; Sanya Richards-Ross; Phyllis Francis*; Jessica Beard*	4 × 400 metres relay	3:25.05	1 Q	—N/a		3:19.44	2nd place, silver medalist(s)
Miranda Melville	20 kilometres walk	—N/a				1:35:19	26
Maria Michta	20 kilometres walk	—N/a				1:33:24	20

Field events

Athlete	Event	Qualification		Final	
Athlete	Event	Distance	Position	Distance	Position
Chaunté Lowe	High jump	NM		Did not advance	
Sandi Morris	Pole vault	4.55	=11 q	4.70	=4
Demi Payne	Pole vault	4.30	19	Did not advance	
Jenn Suhr	Pole vault	4.55	=9 q	4.70	=4
Tianna Bartoletta	Long jump	6.71	7 q	7.14 WL	1st place, gold medalist(s)
Janay DeLoach Soukup	Long jump	6.68	12 q	6.67	8
Brittney Reese	Long jump	6.39	24	Did not advance	
Jasmine Todd	Long jump	6.52	19	Did not advance	
Christina Epps	Triple jump	13.36	24	Did not advance	
Tia Brooks	Shot put	17.71	13	Did not advance	
Michelle Carter	Shot put	19.22	2 Q	19.76	3rd place, bronze medalist(s)
Jeneva Stevens	Shot put	18.05	10 q	17.84	10
Whitney Ashley	Discus throw	60.88	11 q	61.05	9
Gia Lewis-Smallwood	Discus throw	62.04	7 q	60.55	11
Shelbi Vaughan	Discus throw	60.24	14	Did not advance	
Amanda Bingson	Hammer throw	69.99	11 q	72.35 SB	9
Amber Campbell	Hammer throw	72.06	6 q	NM	
DeAnna Price	Hammer throw	68.69	18	Did not advance	
Brittany Borman	Javelin throw	64.22	4 Q	58.26	12
Kara Winger	Javelin throw	62.21	12 q	60.88	8

Combined events – Heptathlon

Athlete	Event	100H	HJ	SP	200 m	LJ	JT	800 m	Final	Rank
Erica Bougard	Result	13.28	1.83	11.40	24.41	6.18	35.06	DNS	DNF	
Erica Bougard	Points	1083	1014	621	942	905	573	—N/a	DNF	
Sharon Day-Monroe	Result	13.42	1.77	14.85	25.05	5.79	46.02	2:11.16	6246	14
Sharon Day-Monroe	Points	1062	941	851	882	768	783	941	6246	14
Barbara Nwaba	Result	DNF	1.77	14.64 PB	24.47	6.08	46.59 PB	2:12.20	5315	27
Barbara Nwaba	Points	—N/a	941	837	936	875	794	933	5315	27
