= 2018 Spanish Indoor Athletics Championships =

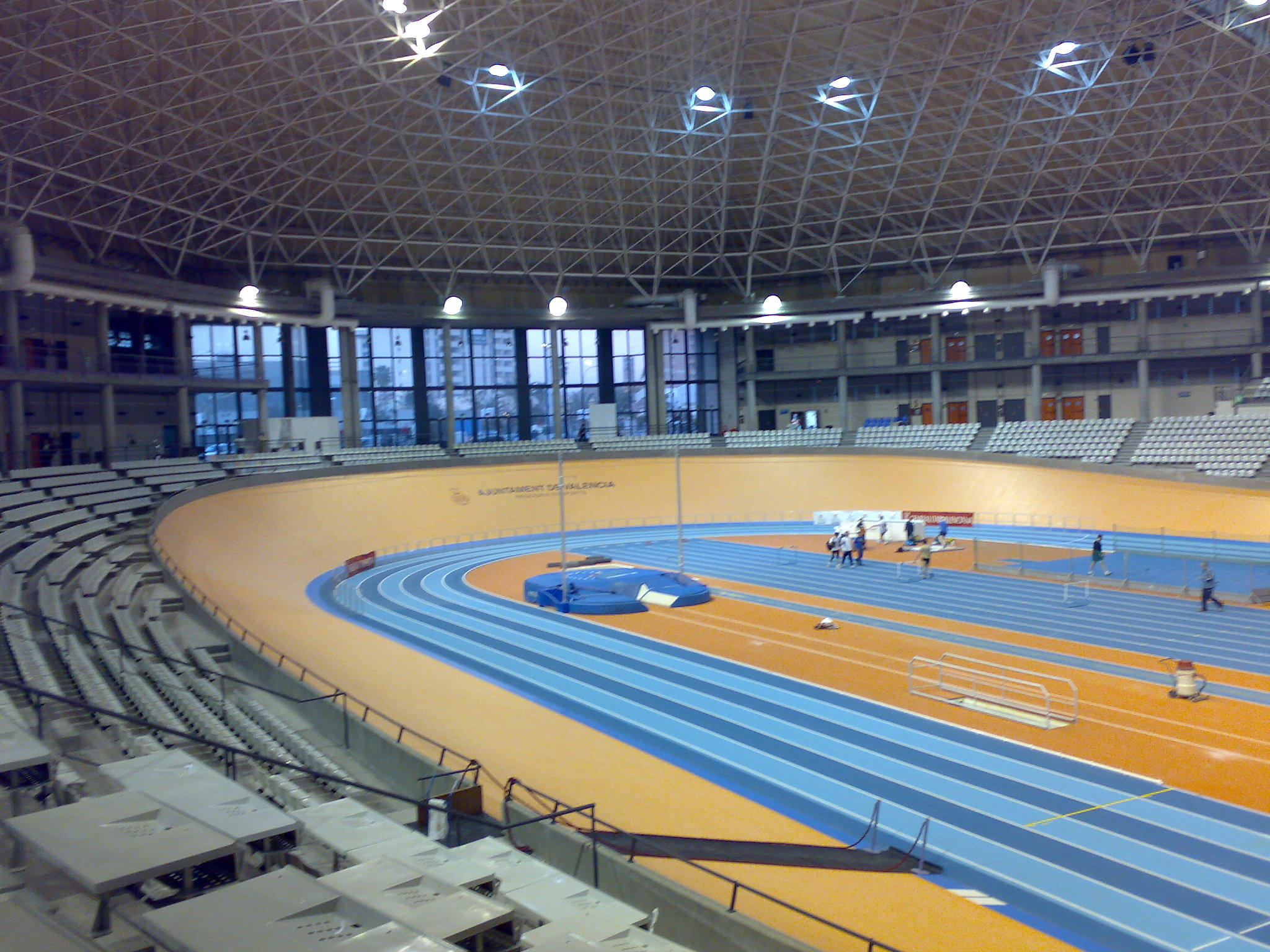
- The host stadium
- Dates: 17–18 February
- Host city: Valencia
- Venue: Luis Puig Palace
- Events: 26

The 2018 Spanish Indoor Athletics Championships was the 54th edition of the annual indoor track and field competition organised by the Royal Spanish Athletics Federation (RFEA), which serves as the Spanish national indoor championship for the sport. A total of 26 events (divided evenly between the sexes) were contested over two days on 17 and 18 February at the Luis Puig Palace in Valencia, Valencian Community.

Óscar Husillos set a Spanish indoor record of 20.68 seconds in the men's 200 metres semi-final.

== Results ==
=== Men ===
Event	Gold		Silver		Bronze	
60 metres	Arian Olmos Téllez; Playas de Castellón	6.73	Sergio López Barranco; At. Alcantarilla	6.75	Ángel David Rodríguez; F.C. Barcelona	6.76
200 metres	Óscar Husillos; F.C. Barcelona	20.69	Daniel Rodríguez Serrano; Playas de Castellón	21.09	Pol Retamal; F.C. Barcelona	21.23
400 metres	Lucas Búa; F.C. Barcelona	46.59	Samuel García; Playas de Castellón	46.83	Manuel Guijarro Arenas; Fent Camí Mislata	46.97
800 metres	Álvaro de Arriba; F.C. Barcelona	1:50.19	Saúl Ordóñez; New Balance Team	1:50.46	Daniel Andújar; Playas de Castellón	1:50.49
1500 metres	Adel Mechaal; New Balance Team	3:43.10	Marc Alcalá; F.C. Barcelona	3:43.87	Jesús Gómez; C.D. Nike Running	3:44.24
3000 metres	Adel Mechaal; New Balance Team	8:19.87	Segio Jiménez Vicente; A.D. Marathon	8:20.95	Gonzalo García Garrido; Cueva de Nerja UMA	8:21.01
60 m hurdles	Yidiel Contreras; Playas de Castellón	7.76	Luis Salort; Correr el Garbí	7.86	Javier Donés Gordillo; Real Sociedad	7:89.
High jump	Simón Siverio; Tenerife Caja Canarias	2.18 m	Marc Sánchez Alonso; C.A. Igualada	2.16 m	Carlos Rojas Lombardo; Unicaja Atletismo	2.16 m
Pole vault	Pau Tonnesen; Playas de Castellón	5.45 m	Aleix Pi Portet; A.A. Catalunya	5.22 m	Istar Dapena Vega; Real Sociedad	5.22 m
Long jump	Eusebio Cáceres; Independent	7.97 m	Héctor Santos; F.C. Barcelona	7.71 m	Fernando Ramos Arqués; Playas de Castellón	7.70 m
Triple jump	Vicente Docavo; Playas de Castellón	16.44 m	Pablo Torrijos; Playas de Castellón	16.37 m	José Emilio Bellido; Playas de Castellón	16.23 m
Shot put	Borja Vivas; At. Málaga	20.27 m	Carlos Tobalina; F.C. Barcelona	19.67 m	Alejandro Noguera; Playas de Castellón	18.60 m
Heptathlon	Jonay Jordán; Tenerife Caja Canarias	5709 pts	Mario Arancón; At. Numantino	5594 pts	Pablo Trescoli; Playas de Castellón	5517 pts

=== Women ===
Event	Gold		Silver		Bronze	
60 metres	Cristina Lara; F.C. Barcelona	7.36	Estela García; C.D. Nike Running	7.47	Carmen Marco Mora; Valencia Esports	7.49
200 metres	Estela García; C.D. Nike Running	23.76	Jaël Bestué; F.C. Barcelona	23.84	Paula Sevilla; Playas de Castellón	23.86
400 metres	Laura Bueno; Valencia Esports	53.10	Aauri Bokesa; C.D. Nike Running	53.78	Herminia Parra Morales; Playas de Castellón	54.31
800 metres	Esther Guerrero; New Balance Team	2:03.45	Natalia Romero; Unicaja Atletismo	2:07.49	Rosalía Tárraga Sánchez; J.A. Elche	2:07.92
1500 metres	Marta Pérez; Valencia Esports	4:20.83	Solange Pereira; Valencia Esports	4:22.10	Carla Masip Gimeno; C.E. Vinaros	4:29.27
3000 metres	Maitane Melero; Grupompleo Pamplona	9:08.43	Beatriz Álvarez Díaz; Universidad Estadio Gijón	9:10.35	Irene Sánchez-Escribano; Playas de Castellón	9:13.80
60 m hurdles	Caridad Jerez; F.C. Barcelona	8.35	Teresa Errandonea; Super Amara BAT	8.42	María Múgica Zubeldia; Valencia Esports	8.43
High jump	Saleta Fernández; Valencia Esports	1.82 m	Raquel Álvarez Polo; At. Numantino	1.78 m	Izaskun Turrillas Bueno; Grupompleo Pamplona	1.75 m
Pole vault	Malen Ruiz de Azúa; Super Amara BAT Mónica Clemente Martí; Avinent Manresa	4.31 m	Not awarded		Carla Franch; F.C. Barcelona	4.16 m
Long jump	Fátima Diame; Valencia Esports	6.44 m	Cora Salas Planas; C.A. Igualada	6.20 m	Concepción Montaner; Playas de Castellón	6.20 m
Triple jump	Ana Peleteiro; C.A. Adidas	14.22 m	Patricia Sarrapio; Playas de Castellón	13.94 m	Andrea Calleja Sánchez; F.C. Barcelona	12.92 m
Shot put	Úrsula Ruiz; Valencia Esports	16.62 m	María Belén Toimil; Playas de Castellón	15.83 m	Elena Gutiérrez; F.C. Barcelona	14.70 m
Pentathlon	Carmen Ramos Vellón; Playas de Castellón	4178 pts	Bárbara Hernando Fuster; Playas de Castellón	4029 pts	Carmen Romero Gómez; Simply Scorpio 71:	3948 pts
