= Luiz Araújo =

Luiz Araújo may refer to:

- Luiz Alberto de Araújo (born 1987), Brazilian decathlete
- Luiz Araújo (footballer) (born 1996), Brazilian footballer
