= Ahmed Al-Dosari =

Ahmed Al-Dosari may refer to:

- Ahmed Fayez Al-Dosari (born 1985), Saudi Arabian long jumper
- Ahmed Khalil Al-Dosari (born 1968), Saudi Arabian association football player
