= 2015 World Championships in Athletics – Men's decathlon =

Men's decathlon at the 2015 World Championships
- Venue: Beijing National Stadium
- Dates: 28 August (day 1); 29 August (day 2)
- Competitors: 29 from 18 nations
- Winning points: 9045

Medalists
gold medal	Ashton Eaton	United States
silver medal	Damian Warner	Canada
bronze medal	Rico Freimuth	Germany

The men's decathlon at the 2015 World Championships in Athletics was held at the Beijing National Stadium on 28 and 29 August.

The winning margin was 350 points which as of 2024 is the only time the decathlon has been won by more than 300 points at these championships.

The overwhelming favorite here had to be the World Record Holder, Olympic Champion and defending Champion, Ashton Eaton. This was Eaton's first decathlon of the year. American Trey Hardee entered as the world leader. Pan American Games and Commonwealth Games champion and returning bronze medalist Damian Warner and returning silver medalist and Götzis winner Michael Schrader were also medal contenders.

Eaton won the first event, the 100 metres in 10.23, a World Championship Decathlon best and #139 in the world, but slightly off world record pace. Warner, Rico Freimuth, and Felipe Dos Santos were right behind him in that fourth heat. In the long jump, again Eaton led, his 7.88 slightly off world record pace and behind his seasonal best but still equal to the #93 jump in the world. Schrader was the second-best jumper of the day but Dos Santos held on to third place.

Freimuth took over third place by winning the shot put in 15.50, Eaton's 14.52 a foot improvement over world record pace. A 2.10 high jump moved Kurt Felix into third position, while Eaton's 2.01 lost a little ground to the world record.

In the 400 metres, Eaton set a World Decathlon Best at 45.00 seconds. It was equal to the #34 time in the world. This was Eaton's third World Decathlon Best after the 100 metres and Long Jump he set during his world record in Eugene in 2012. The 400 was also a 1.70 second improvement over his world record pace. Freimuth moved back into third place.

At the end of the first day, Eaton held a 173-point advantage over Warner, with three Germans, Freimuth, Kai Kazmirek and Schrader bunched behind.

The second day began with Warner running the 110 metres hurdles in 13.63, equal to the #100 time in the world, with Eaton right with him in 13.69 (#110 in the world) and Freimuth next in the same race. Eaton only gained .01 over record pace.

Freimuth won the discus with a 50.17, Eaton's 43.34 gained a half a metre on the world record. Eaton's 5.20 pole vault lost 10 cm to the world record, Ilya Shkurenyov used the same height to move up to fourth place. But the world record became a possibility when Eaton's 63.63 season best improved almost 5 meters on his world record pace. Simply a solid 1500 metres could do it.

In the 1500, Eaton had a perfect pace set by Larbi Bourrada who was in the process of setting the African Record, tying up at the end he crossed in 4:17.52, 3 seconds slower than Eugene but good enough for a 6-point world record improvement. 350 points behind, Warner improved upon his Canadian Record for silver. Freimuth continued to the bronze, Bouraada got fifth place with his record and in eighth place Felix improved his Grenadian National Record.

== Records ==
Prior to the competition, the records were as follows:

World record	Ashton Eaton (USA)	9039	Eugene, OR, United States	23 June 2012
Championship record	Tomáš Dvořák (CZE)	8902	Edmonton, Canada	7 August 2001
World leading	Trey Hardee (USA)	8725	Eugene, OR, United States	26 June 2015
African record	Willem Coertzen (RSA)	8398	Götzis, Austria	31 May 2015
Asian record	Dmitriy Karpov (KAZ)	8725	Athens, Greece	24 August 2004
North, Central American and Caribbean record	Ashton Eaton (USA)	9039	Eugene, OR, United States	23 June 2012
South American record	Carlos Chinin (BRA)	8393	São Paulo, Brazil	8 June 2013
European record	Roman Šebrle (CZE)	9026	Götzis, Austria	27 May 2001
Oceanian record	Jagan Hames (AUS)	8490	Kuala Lumpur, Malaysia	18 September 1998
The following records were established during the competition:
World record	Ashton Eaton (USA)	9045	Beijing, China	29 August 2015
Championship record	Ashton Eaton (USA)	9045	Beijing, China	29 August 2015
World leading	Ashton Eaton (USA)	9045	Beijing, China	29 August 2015
North, Central American and Caribbean record	Ashton Eaton (USA)	9045	Beijing, China	29 August 2015
African record	Larbi Bourrada (ALG)	8461	Beijing, China	29 August 2015

== Qualification standards ==
Entry standards
8075

== Schedule ==
Date	Time	Round
28 August 2015	09:00	100 metres
28 August 2015	10:05	Long jump
28 August 2015	11:55	Shot put
28 August 2015	16:15	High jump
28 August 2015	20:20	400 metres
29 August 2015	09:00	110 metres hurdles
29 August 2015	10:05	Discus throw
29 August 2015	13:15	Pole vault
29 August 2015	17:00	Javelin throw
29 August 2015	20:10	1500 metres

All times are local times (UTC+8)

== Results ==
=== 100 metres ===
The 100 metres was held on 28 August at 09:00.

Rank	Heat	Athlete	Nationality	Result	Points	Notes
1	4	Ashton Eaton	United States	10.23	1040	CDB
2	4	Damian Warner	Canada	10.31	1020	
3	4	Rico Freimuth	Germany	10.51	973	SB
4	4	Felipe dos Santos	Brazil	10.53	968	
5	4	Trey Hardee	United States	10.56	961	
6	3	Eelco Sintnicolaas	Netherlands	10.62	947	PB
7	3	Oleksiy Kasyanov	Ukraine	10.73	922	SB
8	3	Yordanis García	Cuba	10.77	912	SB
9	4	Michael Schrader	Germany	10.78	910	
10	4	Zachery Ziemek	United States	10.81	903	
11	3	Larbi Bourrada	Algeria	10.83	899	SB
12	4	Akihiko Nakamura	Japan	10.86	892	
13	3	Kai Kazmirek	Germany	10.90	883	
14	3	Luiz Alberto de Araújo	Brazil	10.92	878	
15	2	Willem Coertzen	South Africa	10.98	865	SB
16	2	Jorge Ureña	Spain	10.99	863	
17	2	Ilya Shkurenyov	Russia	11.01	858	SB
18	2	Kurt Felix	Grenada	11.02	856	
19	3	Jeremy Taiwo	United States	11.06	847	
20	2	Paweł Wiesiołek	Poland	11.07	845	
21	1	Adam Helcelet	Czech Republic	11.09	841	
22	2	Pieter Braun	Netherlands	11.11	836	
23	2	Bastien Auzeil	France	11.22	812	
24	1	Maicel Uibo	Estonia	11.25	806	
25	1	Pau Tonnesen	Spain	11.26	804	PB
26	1	Niels Pittomvils	Belgium	11.39	776	
27	1	Thomas van der Plaetsen	Belgium	11.44	765	
28	1	Janek Õiglane	Estonia	11.51	750	
28	1	Keisuke Ushiro	Japan	11.51	750	

=== Long jump ===
The long jump was held on 28 August at 10:05.

Rank	Group	Athlete	Nationality	No. 1	No. 2	No. 3	Result	Points	Notes	Overall	Overall Rank
1	A	Ashton Eaton	United States	7.88	x	7.62	7.88	1030		2070	1
2	A	Michael Schrader	Germany	7.71	7.71	x	7.71	987		1897	5
3	B	Kurt Felix	Grenada	x	7.20	7.66	7.66	975	SB	1831	11
4	A	Damian Warner	Canada	7.65	x	x	7.65	972	PB	1992	2
5	A	Oleksiy Kasyanov	Ukraine	x	x	7.58	7.58	955		1877	7
6	B	Zachery Ziemek	United States	7.19	x	7.57	7.57	952	SB	1855	8
7	A	Felipe dos Santos	Brazil	5.26	7.54	7.40	7.54	945	SB	1913	3
8	A	Rico Freimuth	Germany	7.32	7.37	7.51	7.51	937		1910	4
9	B	Larbi Bourrada	Algeria	7.16	7.31	7.51	7.51	937	SB	1836	10
10	A	Eelco Sintnicolaas	Netherlands	x	7.43	7.50	7.50	935		1882	6
11	A	Ilya Shkurenyov	Russia	x	7.50	x	7.50	935		1793	12
12	B	Thomas van der Plaetsen	Belgium	7.32	7.42	x	7.42	915	SB	1680	22
13	A	Kai Kazmirek	Germany	x	7.40	x	7.40	910		1793	13
14	A	Jorge Ureña	Spain	x	7.29	7.30	7.30	886		1749	15
15	B	Trey Hardee	United States	7.30	7.20	x	7.30	886		1847	9
16	A	Adam Helcelet	Czech Republic	7.22	7.29	7.21	7.29	883		1724	17
17	A	Pieter Braun	Netherlands	x	7.22	7.29	7.29	883		1719	18
18	B	Akihiko Nakamura	Japan	x	7.26	7.20	7.26	876		1768	14
19	B	Bastien Auzeil	France	7.13	7.26	x	7.26	876		1688	20
20	B	Willem Coertzen	South Africa	7.22	7.25	x	7.25	874		1739	16
21	B	Pau Tonnesen	Spain	7.20	x	7.21	7.21	864		1668	25
22	A	Jeremy Taiwo	United States	x	7.14	7.15	7.15	850		1697	19
23	A	Maicel Uibo	Estonia	x	x	7.13	7.13	845		1651	26
24	A	Paweł Wiesiołek	Poland	7.08	x	7.08	7.08	833		1678	23
25	B	Luiz Alberto de Araújo	Brazil	x	6.94	x	6.94	799		1677	24
26	B	Niels Pittomvils	Belgium	x	x	6.86	6.86	781		1557	27
27	B	Yordanis García	Cuba	6.82	x	x	6.82	771		1683	21
28	B	Janek Õiglane	Estonia	6.75	6.78	x	6.78	762		1512	28
29	B	Keisuke Ushiro	Japan	6.73	4.86	x	6.73	750		1500	29

=== Shot put ===
The shot put was held on 28 August at 11:55.

Rank	Group	Athlete	Nationality	No. 1	No. 2	No. 3	Result	Points	Notes	Overall	Overall Rank
1	A	Rico Freimuth	Germany	15.23	15.50	14.86	15.50	820		2730	3
2	A	Bastien Auzeil	France	14.69	15.38	x	15.38	813		2501	14
3	A	Adam Helcelet	Czech Republic	15.11	15.29	15.30	15.30	808	PB	2532	12
4	A	Kurt Felix	Grenada	13.81	15.02	14.39	15.02	791		2622	6
5	A	Keisuke Ushiro	Japan	13.30	14.36	14.93	14.93	785		2285	27
6	A	Luiz Alberto de Araújo	Brazil	x	14.84	14.35	14.84	780		2457	15
7	A	Eelco Sintnicolaas	Netherlands	14.13	14.65	14.60	14.65	768		2650	4
8	A	Yordanis García	Cuba	14.54	14.35	14.49	14.54	761		2444	17
9	A	Ashton Eaton	United States	14.33	14.52	x	14.52	760		2830	1
10	B	Maicel Uibo	Estonia	14.42	14.37	14.45	14.45	756		2407	20
11	B	Damian Warner	Canada	14.44	14.17	14.01	14.44	755	PB	2747	2
12	A	Janek Õiglane	Estonia	13.76	14.43	14.30	14.43	755		2267	28
13	A	Michael Schrader	Germany	12.11	x	14.32	14.32	748		2645	5
14	B	Kai Kazmirek	Germany	13.90	13.85	14.27	14.27	745	SB	2538	11
15	B	Oleksiy Kasyanov	Ukraine	x	13.98	14.25	14.25	744		2621	7
16	A	Jeremy Taiwo	United States	14.04	x	14.18	14.18	739		2436	19
17	B	Ilya Shkurenyov	Russia	14.03	13.54	14.09	14.09	734		2527	13
18	B	Pieter Braun	Netherlands	13.51	13.90	x	13.90	722		2441	18
19	B	Thomas van der Plaetsen	Belgium	13.60	13.56	13.83	13.83	718	SB	2398	22
20	B	Willem Coertzen	South Africa	13.66	13.75	x	13.75	713		2452	16
21	A	Pau Tonnesen	Spain	13.54	x	13.74	13.74	712		2380	23
22	B	Larbi Bourrada	Algeria	13.44	12.88	13.73	13.73	712	SB	2548	9
23	B	Felipe dos Santos	Brazil	13.20	13.61	13.32	13.61	704		2617	8
24	B	Paweł Wiesiołek	Poland	13.50	x	x	13.50	698		2376	24
25	A	Zachery Ziemek	United States	13.28	13.38	13.21	13.38	690		2545	10
26	B	Niels Pittomvils	Belgium	12.13	x	12.77	12.77	653		2210	29
27	B	Jorge Ureña	Spain	11.01	12.74	x	12.74	651		2400	21
28	B	Akihiko Nakamura	Japan	11.14	11.67	10.94	11.67	586		2354	25
29	A	Trey Hardee	United States	x	10.20	–	10.20	498		2345	26

=== High jump ===
The high jump was held on 28 August at 16:15.

Rank	Group	Athlete	Nationality	1.86	1.89	1.92	1.95	1.98	2.01	2.04	2.07	2.10	2.13	2.16	Result	Points	Notes	Overall	Overall Rank
1	A	Maicel Uibo	Estonia	–	–	–	–	o	–	xo	o	o	o	xxx	2.13	925		3332	14
1	A	Thomas van der Plaetsen	Belgium	–	–	–	o	–	o	o	o	xo	o	xxx	2.13	925	SB	3323	16
3	A	Jeremy Taiwo	United States	–	–	–	–	o	–	o	–	xo	xxx		2.10	896		3332	15
4	A	Kai Kazmirek	Germany	–	–	–	o	–	o	–	–	xo	xxx		2.10	896	SB	3434	6
4	A	Kurt Felix	Grenada	–	–	–	o	–	o	xo	xo	xo	xxx		2.10	896	SB	3518	3
6	A	Ilya Shkurenyov	Russia	–	–	o	–	o	o	xo	o	xxo	xxx		2.10	896		3423	8
7	B	Larbi Bourrada	Algeria	o	o	o	o	o	o	xxo	xo	xxx			2.07	868	SB	3416	9
8	A	Adam Helcelet	Czech Republic	–	o	–	o	xo	o	o	xxx				2.04	840		3372	13
8	A	Pau Tonnesen	Spain	–	–	–	o	o	xo	o	xxx				2.04	840		3220	20
10	B	Damian Warner	Canada	o	o	o	o	o	xxo	o	xxx				2.04	840	SB	3587	2
11	A	Zachery Ziemek	United States	–	–	–	xo	xo	xxo	o	xxx				2.04	840		3385	11
12	B	Yordanis García	Cuba	–	o	o	xo	o	xxo	xo	xxx				2.04	840	SB	3284	18
13	B	Pieter Braun	Netherlands	–	o	–	o	o	xo	xxo	xxR				2.04	840	SB	3281	19
14	B	Bastien Auzeil	France	–	–	o	o	o	o	xxx					2.01	813	SB	3314	17
15	A	Jorge Ureña	Spain	–	o	–	o	xo	o	xxx					2.01	813		3213	21
16	B	Oleksiy Kasyanov	Ukraine	–	–	o	xo	xxo	o	xxx					2.01	813	SB	3434	5
17	A	Ashton Eaton	United States	–	–	o	o	o	xo	xxx					2.01	813		3643	1
18	B	Felipe dos Santos	Brazil	o	–	o	o	xo	xo	xxx					2.01	813		3430	7
19	A	Paweł Wiesiołek	Poland	–	o	xxo	xo	o	xxx						1.98	785		3161	23
20	B	Willem Coertzen	South Africa	–	o	o	o	xxx							1.95	758		3210	22
20	B	Akihiko Nakamura	Japan	–	o	o	o	xxx							1.95	758		3112	24
20	B	Rico Freimuth	Germany	o	o	o	o	xxx							1.95	758	SB	3488	4
23	B	Michael Schrader	Germany	xo	o	o	o	xxx							1.95	758	SB	3403	10
24	A	Janek Õiglane	Estonia	–	o	o	xxx								1.92	731		2998	25
25	A	Niels Pittomvils	Belgium	–	o	xo	xxx								1.92	731		2941	27
25	B	Eelco Sintnicolaas	Netherlands	o	–	xo	xxx								1.92	731		3381	12
27	B	Keisuke Ushiro	Japan	xo	o	xxx									1.89	705		2990	26
	B	Trey Hardee	United States												DNS	0		DNF	
	B	Luiz Alberto de Araújo	Brazil												DNS	0		DNF	

=== 400 metres ===
The 400 metres was held on 28 August at 20:20.

Rank	Heat	Athlete	Nationality	Result	Points	Notes	Overall	Overall Rank
1	4	Ashton Eaton	United States	45.00	1060	WDB	4703	1
2	4	Kai Kazmirek	Germany	46.83	967	SB	4401	4
3	4	Michael Schrader	Germany	47.12	952	PB	4355	5
4	4	Damian Warner	Canada	47.30	943		4530	2
5	3	Larbi Bourrada	Algeria	47.60	929	SB	4345	6
6	4	Akihiko Nakamura	Japan	47.81	918		4030	22
7	2	Rico Freimuth	Germany	47.82	918	SB	4406	3
8	2	Ilya Shkurenyov	Russia	47.88	915	PB	4338	9
9	3	Felipe dos Santos	Brazil	47.89	914	SB	4344	7
10	3	Eelco Sintnicolaas	Netherlands	47.93	913	SB	4294	11
11	4	Jeremy Taiwo	United States	47.94	912		4244	12
12	3	Oleksiy Kasyanov	Ukraine	48.13	903	SB	4337	10
13	4	Pieter Braun	Netherlands	48.24	898		4179	16
14	2	Paweł Wiesiołek	Poland	48.55	883	PB	4044	21
15	2	Bastien Auzeil	France	48.66	877	PB	4191	15
16	3	Yordanis García	Cuba	48.67	877		4161	17
17	2	Jorge Ureña	Spain	49.17	853	PB	4066	20
18	2	Niels Pittomvils	Belgium	49.45	840	SB	3781	24
19	1	Adam Helcelet	Czech Republic	49.66	830	SB	4202	14
20	1	Zachery Ziemek	United States	49.89	820	PB	4205	13
20	3	Kurt Felix	Grenada	49.89	820		4338	8
22	1	Pau Tonnesen	Spain	50.24	804	PB	4024	23
23	1	Maicel Uibo	Estonia	50.24	804	PB	4136	18
24	1	Thomas van der Plaetsen	Belgium	50.28	802	SB	4125	19
25	2	Keisuke Ushiro	Japan	50.85	776		3766	26
26	1	Janek Õiglane	Estonia	50.95	771	PB	3769	25
	3	Willem Coertzen	South Africa	DNS	0		DNF	

=== 110 metres hurdles ===
The 110 metres hurdles was held on 29 August at 09:00.

Rank	Heat	Athlete	Nationality	Result	Points	Notes	Overall	Overall Rank
1	4	Damian Warner	Canada	13.63	1023		5553	2
2	4	Ashton Eaton	United States	13.69	1015		5718	1
3	4	Rico Freimuth	Germany	13.91	986	SB	5392	3
4	3	Oleksiy Kasyanov	Ukraine	13.96	980	SB	5317	5
5	4	Michael Schrader	Germany	14.19	950		5305	6
6	3	Adam Helcelet	Czech Republic	14.20	949	PB	5151	11
7	2	Larbi Bourrada	Algeria	14.26	941	PB	5286	7
8	4	Ilya Shkurenyov	Russia	14.27	940		5278	8
9	3	Pieter Braun	Netherlands	14.37	927		5106	13
10	3	Kai Kazmirek	Germany	14.39	925		5326	4
11	3	Jorge Ureña	Spain	14.41	922		4988	17
12	1	Kurt Felix	Grenada	14.58	901	PB	5239	9
13	4	Felipe dos Santos	Brazil	14.64	894		894	10
14	2	Bastien Auzeil	France	14.71	885		5076	14
15	3	Akihiko Nakamura	Japan	14.72	884		4914	20
16	2	Thomas van der Plaetsen	Belgium	14.76	879		5004	16
17	2	Jeremy Taiwo	United States	14.81	873		5117	12
18	2	Paweł Wiesiołek	Poland	14.82	871		4915	19
19	1	Maicel Uibo	Estonia	15.01	848		4984	18
20	1	Niels Pittomvils	Belgium	15.09	839		4620	22
21	1	Pau Tonnesen	Spain	15.12	835		4859	21
22	1	Zachery Ziemek	United States	15.29	815		5020	15
23	2	Janek Õiglane	Estonia	15.33	810		4579	23
24	1	Keisuke Ushiro	Japan	15.43	798		4564	24
	4	Yordanis García	Cuba	DNF	0		4161	25
	3	Eelco Sintnicolaas	Netherlands	DNS	0		0	

=== Discus throw ===
The discus throw was held on 29 August at 10:05.

Rank	Group	Athlete	Nationality	#1	#2	#3	Result	Points	Notes	Overall	Overall Rank
1	A	Rico Freimuth	Germany	50.02	x	50.17	50.17	874		6266	3
2	A	Keisuke Ushiro	Japan	42.62	45.65	46.85	46.85	805		5369	22
3	A	Kurt Felix	Grenada	45.76	45.04	45.95	45.95	786	PB	6025	7
4	A	Oleksiy Kasyanov	Ukraine	29.12	45.84	41.97	45.84	784		6101	4
5	A	Pau Tonnesen	Spain	45.12	42.43	45.28	45.28	773		5632	18
6	A	Damian Warner	Canada	44.74	44.99	44.74	44.99	767		6320	2
7	A	Michael Schrader	Germany	44.58	44.11	44.26	44.58	758		6063	5
8	A	Ilya Shkurenyov	Russia	43.39	42.59	44.53	44.53	757		6035	6
9	A	Zachery Ziemek	United States	44.17	43.84	44.19	44.19	750		5770	15
10	A	Maicel Uibo	Estonia	39.93	43.69	43.41	43.69	740		5724	17
11	A	Ashton Eaton	United States	41.81	43.34	42.91	43.34	733		6451	1
12	B	Thomas van der Plaetsen	Belgium	x	43.01	x	43.01	726	SB	5730	16
13	A	Adam Helcelet	Czech Republic	38.75	42.90	x	42.90	724		5875	10
14	B	Bastien Auzeil	France	39.63	42.63	x	42.63	718		5794	14
15	B	Pieter Braun	Netherlands	38.06	42.09	39.42	42.09	707		5813	12
16	A	Paweł Wiesiołek	Poland	39.84	41.55	41.28	41.55	696		5611	19
17	B	Larbi Bourrada	Algeria	40.67	40.42	41.53	41.53	696	PB	5982	9
18	B	Jeremy Taiwo	United States	39.14	x	41.01	41.01	685		5802	13
19	B	Janek Õiglane	Estonia	38.78	37.70	40.94	40.94	684	PB	5263	24
20	B	Kai Kazmirek	Germany	40.08	38.08	39.22	40.08	666		5992	8
21	B	Niels Pittomvils	Belgium	39.68	x	39.90	39.90	663		5283	23
22	B	Felipe dos Santos	Brazil	32.79	x	36.66	36.66	597		5835	11
23	B	Jorge Ureña	Spain	35.20	33.64	x	35.20	568		5556	20
24	B	Akihiko Nakamura	Japan	24.09	33.48	32.86	33.48	533		5447	21
	B	Eelco Sintnicolaas	Netherlands				DNS	0			
	B	Yordanis García	Cuba				DNS	0			

=== Pole vault ===
The pole vault was held on 29 August at 13:15.

Rank	Group	Athlete	Nationality	Result	Points	Notes	Overall	Overall Rank
1	A	Thomas van der Plaetsen	Belgium	5.30	1004	SB	6734	13
2	A	Ilya Shkurenyov	Russia	5.20	972		7007	4
3	A	Kai Kazmirek	Germany	5.20	972	PB	6964	5
3	A	Zachery Ziemek	United States	5.20	972		6742	11
5	A	Ashton Eaton	United States	5.20	972		7423	1
6	A	Bastien Auzeil	France	5.10	941		6735	12
7	A	Maicel Uibo	Estonia	5.10	941		6665	16
8	B	Pieter Braun	Netherlands	4.90	880	PB	6693	14
9	A	Adam Helcelet	Czech Republic	4.90	880	SB	6755	10
10	B	Oleksiy Kasyanov	Ukraine	4.80	849	SB	6950	6
11	B	Felipe dos Santos	Brazil	4.80	849	PB	6684	15
11	B	Rico Freimuth	Germany	4.80	849	SB	7115	3
13	A	Pau Tonnesen	Spain	4.80	849		6481	17
14	B	Damian Warner	Canada	4.80	849	PB	7169	2
15	B	Larbi Bourrada	Algeria	4.80	849	SB	6831	8
16	B	Keisuke Ushiro	Japan	4.70	819		6188	20
17	B	Akihiko Nakamura	Japan	4.70	819		6266	19
18	A	Michael Schrader	Germany	4.60	790		6853	7
19	B	Janek Õiglane	Estonia	4.60	790	SB	6053	21
20	B	Paweł Wiesiołek	Poland	4.50	760		6371	18
21	B	Kurt Felix	Grenada	4.50	760		6785	9
	B	Jorge Ureña	Spain	NM	0		5556	22
	A	Niels Pittomvils	Belgium	NM	0		5283	23
	A	Eelco Sintnicolaas	Netherlands	DNS	0		0	
	A	Jeremy Taiwo	United States	DNS	0		0	
	A	Yordanis García	Cuba	DNS	0		0	

=== Javelin throw ===
The javelin throw was held on 29 August at 17:00.

Rank	Group	Athlete	Nationality	Result	Points	Notes	Overall	Overall Rank
1	A	Janek Õiglane	Estonia	68.51	867		6920	18
2	A	Maicel Uibo	Estonia	64.51	806	PB	7471	11
3	B	Larbi Bourrada	Algeria	63.82	795	SB	7626	6
4	B	Ashton Eaton	United States	63.63	793	SB	8216	1
5	B	Damian Warner	Canada	63.50	791	SB	7960	2
6	A	Kurt Felix	Grenada	63.41	789		7574	8
7	A	Adam Helcelet	Czech Republic	63.07	784	SB	7539	9
8	B	Kai Kazmirek	Germany	62.55	776		7740	5
9	A	Michael Schrader	Germany	62.09	769	SB	7622	7
10	B	Ilya Shkurenyov	Russia	60.99	753	SB	7760	4
11	B	Rico Freimuth	Germany	60.61	747		7862	3
12	A	Pau Tonnesen	Spain	60.42	744	PB	7225	16
13	B	Pieter Braun	Netherlands	56.95	692		7385	15
14	A	Keisuke Ushiro	Japan	56.52	686		6874	20
15	B	Zachery Ziemek	United States	56.50	685	SB	7427	12
16	B	Thomas van der Plaetsen	Belgium	55.23	666		7400	13
17	A	Bastien Auzeil	France	55.14	665		7400	14
18	A	Paweł Wiesiołek	Poland	54.08	649		7020	17
19	A	Akihiko Nakamura	Japan	53.57	642	PB	6908	19
20	A	Jorge Ureña	Spain	53.17	636		6192	21
21	A	Niels Pittomvils	Belgium	52.96	633		5916	22
22	B	Oleksiy Kasyanov	Ukraine	49.35	579	SB	7529	10
	B	Felipe dos Santos	Brazil	DNS	0			

=== 1500 metres ===
The 1500 metres was held on 29 August at 20:10.

Rank	Heat	Athlete	Nationality	Result	Points	Notes
1	1	Akihiko Nakamura	Japan	4:16.36	837	
2	2	Larbi Bourrada	Algeria	4:16.61	835	SB
3	2	Ashton Eaton	United States	4:17.52	829	SB
4	2	Michael Schrader	Germany	4:22.30	796	SB
5	2	Ilya Shkurenyov	Russia	4:24.98	778	PB
6	2	Maicel Uibo	Estonia	4:25.53	774	PB
7	1	Niels Pittomvils	Belgium	4:27.40	762	PB
8	2	Damian Warner	Canada	4:31.51	735	
9	2	Oleksiy Kasyanov	Ukraine	4:31.80	733	
10	1	Pieter Braun	Netherlands	4:32.46	729	
11	2	Kurt Felix	Grenada	4:32.57	728	PB
12	2	Kai Kazmirek	Germany	4:35.61	708	
13	2	Rico Freimuth	Germany	4:37.05	699	SB
14	2	Adam Helcelet	Czech Republic	4:37.65	695	PB
15	1	Bastien Auzeil	France	4:37.92	693	PB
16	1	Paweł Wiesiołek	Poland	4:39.31	685	
17	1	Jorge Ureña	Spain	4:42.21	666	
18	1	Janek Õiglane	Estonia	4:43.06	661	
19	1	Keisuke Ushiro	Japan	4:43.51	658	
20	1	Thomas van der Plaetsen	Belgium	4:47.38	635	SB
21	1	Zachery Ziemek	United States	4:56.66	579	PB
22	1	Pau Tonnesen	Spain	5:33.73	381	

=== Final standings ===
After all events.

Rank	Athlete	Nationality	Total	Note
1st place, gold medalist(s)	Ashton Eaton	United States	9045	WR
2nd place, silver medalist(s)	Damian Warner	Canada	8695	NR
3rd place, bronze medalist(s)	Rico Freimuth	Germany	8561	PB
4	Ilya Shkurenyov	Russia	8538	PB
5	Larbi Bourrada	Algeria	8461	AR
6	Kai Kazmirek	Germany	8448	
7	Michael Schrader	Germany	8418	
8	Kurt Felix	Grenada	8302	NR
9	Oleksiy Kasyanov	Ukraine	8262	SB
10	Maicel Uibo	Estonia	8245	
11	Adam Helcelet	Czech Republic	8234	SB
12	Pieter Braun	Netherlands	8114	
13	Bastien Auzeil	France	8093	
14	Thomas van der Plaetsen	Belgium	8035	SB
15	Zachery Ziemek	United States	8006	
16	Akihiko Nakamura	Japan	7745	
17	Paweł Wiesiołek	Poland	7705	
18	Pau Tonnesen	Spain	7606	
19	Janek Õiglane	Estonia	7581	
20	Keisuke Ushiro	Japan	7532	
21	Jorge Ureña	Spain	6858	
22	Niels Pittomvils	Belgium	6678	
	Felipe dos Santos	Brazil	DNF	
	Jeremy Taiwo	United States	DNF	
	Yordanis García	Cuba	DNF	
	Eelco Sintnicolaas	Netherlands	DNF	
	Willem Coertzen	South Africa	DNF	
	Luiz Alberto de Araújo	Brazil	DNF	
	Trey Hardee	United States	DNF	
