= 2002 World Junior Championships in Athletics – Men's long jump =

Held in Kingston, Jamaica

The men's long jump event at the 2002 World Junior Championships in Athletics was held in Kingston, Jamaica, at National Stadium on 17 and 18 July.

== Medalists ==
| Gold | Abdullah Al-Waleed; Qatar |
| Silver | Fabrice Lapierre; Australia |
| Bronze | Trevell Quinley; United States |

== Results ==
=== Final ===
18 July

| Rank | Name | Nationality | Attempts | | | | | | Result | Notes |
| Rank | Name | Nationality | 1 | 2 | 3 | 4 | 5 | 6 | Result | Notes |
|---|---|---|---|---|---|---|---|---|---|---|
| 1st place, gold medalist(s) | Abdullah Al-Waleed | Qatar | 7.40 (w: -1.2 m/s) | 7.99 (w: 0.0 m/s) | x | x | 7.47 (w: -1.3 m/s) | 7.67 (w: -0.4 m/s) | 7.99 (w: 0.0 m/s) | |
| 2nd place, silver medalist(s) | Fabrice Lapierre | Australia | 7.41 (w: -0.8 m/s) | 7.05 (w: -0.5 m/s) | 7.26 (w: -0.7 m/s) | x | 7.50 (w: -0.6 m/s) | 7.74 (w: -0.8 m/s) | 7.74 (w: -0.8 m/s) | |
| 3rd place, bronze medalist(s) | Trevell Quinley | United States | x | 7.41 (w: -0.6 m/s) | 7.71 (w: -0.3 m/s) | x | x | 7.52 (w: -1.0 m/s) | 7.71 (w: -0.3 m/s) | |
| 4 | Ahmed Al-Dosari | Saudi Arabia | x | 7.52 (w: -0.3 m/s) | x | x | 7.60 (w: -1.1 m/s) | x | 7.60 (w: -1.1 m/s) | |
| 5 | Amritpal Singh | India | 7.47 (w: -0.9 m/s) | 7.56 (w: -0.5 m/s) | 7.33 (w: -1.6 m/s) | 7.42 (w: -0.2 m/s) | 7.49 (w: +0.1 m/s) | 7.50 (w: -0.5 m/s) | 7.56 (w: -0.5 m/s) | |
| 6 | John Thornell | Australia | x | 7.32 (w: -0.2 m/s) | 7.53 (w: 0.0 m/s) | 7.39 (w: -1.2 m/s) | 6.90 (w: -0.7 m/s) | x | 7.53 (w: 0.0 m/s) | |
| 7 | Petr Lampart | Czech Republic | 7.21 (w: +0.1 m/s) | 7.26 (w: -1.0 m/s) | 7.44 (w: -1.1 m/s) | x | 7.51 (w: -0.6 m/s) | 5.84 (w: -1.2 m/s) | 7.51 (w: -0.6 m/s) | |
| 8 | Peter Rapp | Germany | 7.45 (w: -0.1 m/s) | 7.46 (w: +0.3 m/s) | 7.35 (w: -1.6 m/s) | 7.48 (w: +0.4 m/s) | 7.26 (w: -0.3 m/s) | x | 7.48 (w: +0.4 m/s) | |
| 9 | Sedain McDonald | Jamaica | 7.15 (w: -0.9 m/s) | 7.30 (w: -0.8 m/s) | 7.14 (w: -0.5 m/s) | | | | 7.30 (w: -0.8 m/s) | |
| 10 | Jairo Guibert | Cuba | x | 7.20 (w: -0.4 m/s) | 7.29 (w: -0.2 m/s) | | | | 7.29 (w: -0.2 m/s) | |
| 11 | Povilas Mykolaitis | Lithuania | 7.25 (w: -0.9 m/s) | x | 7.28 (w: 0.0 m/s) | | | | 7.28 (w: 0.0 m/s) | |
| 12 | Khotso Mokoena | South Africa | 7.08 (w: -0.7 m/s) | 7.06 (w: -0.8 m/s) | 6.94 (w: -1.0 m/s) | | | | 7.08 (w: -0.7 m/s) | |

=== Qualifications ===
17 Jul

==== Group A ====
| Rank | Name | Nationality | Attempts | | | Result | Notes |
| Rank | Name | Nationality | 1 | 2 | 3 | Result | Notes |
|---|---|---|---|---|---|---|---|
| 1 | Abdullah Al-Waleed | Qatar | 7.64 (w: +0.6 m/s) | - | - | 7.64 (w: +0.6 m/s) | Q |
| 2 | John Thornell | Australia | x | 7.56 (w: +0.9 m/s) | 7.49 (w: -1.0 m/s) | 7.56 (w: +0.9 m/s) | q |
| 3 | Khotso Mokoena | South Africa | x | x | 7.47 (w: -0.9 m/s) | 7.47 (w: -0.9 m/s) | q |
| 4 | Amritpal Singh | India | 7.18 (w: +0.5 m/s) | 7.45 (w: NWI) | 7.43 (w: -0.3 m/s) | 7.45 (w: NWI) | q |
| 5 | Trevell Quinley | United States | 7.29 (w: 0.0 m/s) | 7.41 (w: -1.5 m/s) | 7.36 (w: -1.1 m/s) | 7.41 (w: -1.5 m/s) | q |
| 6 | Jairo Guibert | Cuba | 7.23 (w: -0.8 m/s) | 7.33 (w: -0.7 m/s) | 7.39 (w: -1.5 m/s) | 7.39 (w: -1.5 m/s) | q |
| 7 | Cai Peng | China | 7.38 (w: +0.5 m/s) | x | x | 7.38 (w: +0.5 m/s) | |
| 8 | Nelson Évora | Portugal | 7.00 (w: +0.2 m/s) | 7.28 (w: +0.7 m/s) | 7.22 (w: -1.1 m/s) | 7.28 (w: +0.7 m/s) | |
| 9 | Kim Sang-Su | South Korea | 7.21 (w: NWI) | 7.05 (w: -2.0 m/s) | x | 7.21 (w: NWI) | |
| 10 | Kozo Kimura | Japan | 6.88 (w: +0.5 m/s) | 7.01 (w: 0.0 m/s) | 7.21 (w: -0.8 m/s) | 7.21 (w: -0.8 m/s) | |
| 11 | Cédric Judith | France | 6.89 (w: +0.9 m/s) | 7.12 (w: -1.5 m/s) | 7.20 (w: -0.5 m/s) | 7.20 (w: -0.5 m/s) | |
| 12 | Marcos Trivelato | Brazil | 7.20 (w: -0.4 m/s) | 7.11 (w: -1.2 m/s) | 7.02 (w: -0.6 m/s) | 7.20 (w: -0.4 m/s) | |
| 13 | Efthímios Steryioúlis | Greece | 7.15 (w: +0.6 m/s) | 7.18 (w: -1.2 m/s) | x | 7.18 (w: -1.2 m/s) | |
| 14 | Christian Kaczmarek | Germany | 7.02 (w: +0.1 m/s) | 7.18 (w: -1.0 m/s) | 7.05 (w: -0.1 m/s) | 7.18 (w: -1.0 m/s) | |
| 15 | Aleksandr Patselya | Ukraine | 7.06 (w: +0.5 m/s) | 6.96 (w: -0.4 m/s) | 7.11 (w: +0.4 m/s) | 7.11 (w: +0.4 m/s) | |
| 16 | Lukáš Lípa | Czech Republic | x | 6.78 (w: -0.5 m/s) | x | 6.78 (w: -0.5 m/s) | |

==== Group B ====
| Rank | Name | Nationality | Attempts | | | Result | Notes |
| Rank | Name | Nationality | 1 | 2 | 3 | Result | Notes |
|---|---|---|---|---|---|---|---|
| 1 | Petr Lampart | Czech Republic | 7.69 (w: +0.9 m/s) | - | - | 7.69 (w: +0.9 m/s) | Q |
| 2 | Peter Rapp | Germany | 7.64 (w: 0.0 m/s) | - | - | 7.64 (w: 0.0 m/s) | Q |
| 2 | Ahmed Al-Dosari | Saudi Arabia | x | 7.64 (w: -1.1 m/s) | - | 7.64 (w: -1.1 m/s) | Q |
| 4 | Fabrice Lapierre | Australia | 7.45 (w: +0.1 m/s) | x | x | 7.45 (w: +0.1 m/s) | q |
| 5 | Sedain McDonald | Jamaica | 7.40 (w: -0.1 m/s) | x | 6.92 (w: -1.5 m/s) | 7.40 (w: -0.1 m/s) | q |
| 6 | Povilas Mykolaitis | Lithuania | 7.28 (w: +0.8 m/s) | 7.38 (w: +0.1 m/s) | x | 7.38 (w: +0.1 m/s) | q |
| 7 | Chao Chih-Chien | Chinese Taipei | 7.37 (w: -0.7 m/s) | 7.10 (w: -1.2 m/s) | 7.30 (w: -0.1 m/s) | 7.37 (w: -0.7 m/s) | |
| 8 | Ndiss Kaba Badji | Senegal | x | x | 7.37 (w: -1.5 m/s) | 7.37 (w: -1.5 m/s) | |
| 9 | Thiago Dias | Brazil | x | 7.34 (w: +0.9 m/s) | 6.87 (w: -1.5 m/s) | 7.34 (w: +0.9 m/s) | |
| 10 | Irving Saladino | Panama | 6.87 (w: -0.3 m/s) | 7.29 (w: -1.6 m/s) | 7.30 (w: -0.5 m/s) | 7.30 (w: -0.5 m/s) | |
| 11 | Danut Simion | Romania | x | x | 7.28 (w: -0.6 m/s) | 7.28 (w: -0.6 m/s) | |
| 12 | Yuki Imai | Japan | 6.91 (w: +0.3 m/s) | 7.24 (w: +0.1 m/s) | 6.91 (w: -0.4 m/s) | 7.24 (w: +0.1 m/s) | |
| 13 | Alfonso Álvarez | Spain | 7.16 (w: +0.3 m/s) | 7.10 (w: -0.3 m/s) | 7.22 (w: -0.5 m/s) | 7.22 (w: -0.5 m/s) | |
| 14 | Miroslav Stankov | Bulgaria | 7.04 (w: -0.3 m/s) | x | 6.98 (w: -0.6 m/s) | 7.04 (w: -0.3 m/s) | |
| 15 | Dimítrios Diamadáras | Greece | x | 5.42 (w: -0.7 m/s) | x | 5.42 (w: -0.7 m/s) | |
| | Dmitriy Sapinskiy | Russia | x | x | x | NM | |
| | Marvin Lucas | United States | x | - | - | NM | |

== Participation ==
According to an unofficial count, 33 athletes from 26 countries participated in the event.

- Australia (2)
- Brazil (2)
- Bulgaria (1)
- China (1)
- Chinese Taipei (1)
- Cuba (1)
- Czech Republic (2)
- France (1)
- Germany (2)
- Greece (2)
- India (1)
- Jamaica (1)
- Japan (2)
- Lithuania (1)
- Panama (1)
- Portugal (1)
- Qatar (1)
- Romania (1)
- Russia (1)
- Saudi Arabia (1)
- Senegal (1)
- South Africa (1)
- South Korea (1)
- Spain (1)
- Ukraine (1)
- United States (2)
