= Saudi Arabia at the 2022 World Athletics Championships =

- Flag of Saudi Arabia
- WA code: KSA
- National federation: Saudi Arabian Athletic Federation
- Website: www.athletics.sa

in Eugene, United States 15–24 July 2022
- Competitors: 2 (1 man and 1 woman) in 2 events
- Medals: Gold 0 Silver 0 Bronze 0 Total 0

World Athletics Championships appearances (overview)
- 1991; 1993; 1995; 1997; 1999; 2001; 2003; 2005; 2007; 2009; 2011; 2013; 2015; 2017; 2019; 2022; 2023; 2025

Saudi Arabia competed at the 2022 World Athletics Championships in Eugene, Oregon from 15 to 24 July 2022. Saudi Arabia had entered 2 athletes.

== Results ==
Key

- Q = Qualified for the next round
- q = Not qualified for the next round as a fastest loser or, in field events, by position without achieving the qualifying target
- NR = National record
- PB = Personal best
- SB = Season best
- N/A = Round not applicable for the event

=== Men ===
Field events

Athlete	Event	Qualification		Final	
Athlete	Event	Distance	Position	Distance	Position
Hussain Al-Hizam	Pole vault	5.65 SB	14	Did not advance	

=== Women ===
Track and road events

Athlete	Event	Heat		Semi-final		Final	
Athlete	Event	Result	Rank	Result	Rank	Result	Rank
Yasmeen Al-Dabbagh	100 metres	13.21	48	Did not advance			
