= 2015 World Championships in Athletics – Women's shot put =

Coordinates: 39.9917°N 116.3906°E

Women's shot put at the 2015 World Championships
- Venue: Beijing National Stadium
- Dates: 22 August
- Competitors: 24 from 17 nations
- Winning distance: 20.37

Medalists
gold medal	Christina Schwanitz	Germany
silver medal	Gong Lijiao	China
bronze medal	Michelle Carter	United States

The women's shot put at the 2015 World Championships in Athletics was held at the Beijing National Stadium on 22 August.

The championship suffered a little with the failure of Valerie Adams to return to defend her 2013 title following surgery over the winter. In the run-up to these championships Adams suffered the end of her 57 event winning streak a month earlier.

In the finals, home favorite Gong Lijiao assumed the early lead with a 20.30 first put. On the third throw, Christina Schwanitz made 20.37 to take the lead. Gong had no answer and the rest of the field was too far behind, led by Michelle Carter's 19.76. Anita Márton threw a fourth round 19.48m national record to take fourth.

== Records ==
Prior to the competition, the records were as follows:

World record	Natalya Lisovskaya (URS)	22.63	Moscow, Soviet Union	7 June 1987
Championship record	Natalya Lisovskaya (URS)	21.24	Rome, Italy	5 September 1987
Championship record	Valerie Adams (NZL)	21.24	Daegu, South Korea	29 August 2011
World leading	Christina Schwanitz (GER)	20.77	Beijing, China	20 May 2015
African record	Vivian Chukwuemeka (NGR)	18.43	Walnut, United States	19 April 2003
Asian record	Li Meisu (CHN)	21.76	Shijiazhuang, China	23 April 1988
North, Central American and Caribbean record	Belsy Laza (CUB)	20.96A	Mexico City, Mexico	2 May 1992
South American record	Elisângela Adriano (BRA)	19.30A	Tunja, Colombia	14 July 2001
European record	Natalya Lisovskaya (URS)	22.63	Moscow, Soviet Union	7 June 1987
Oceanian record	Valerie Adams (NZL)	21.24	Daegu, South Korea	29 August 2011

== Qualification standards ==
Entry standards
17.75

== Schedule ==
Date	Time	Round
22 August 2015	10:10	Qualification
22 August 2015	20:05	Final

All times are local times (UTC+8)

== Results ==
KEY:	Q	Qualified	q	12 best performers	NR	National record	PB	Personal best	SB	Seasonal best

=== Qualification ===
Qualification: Qualifying Performance 18.30 (Q) or at least 12 best performers (q) advanced to the final.

Rank	Group	Name	Nationality	#1	#2	#3	Mark	Notes
1	A	Christina Schwanitz	Germany	19.39			19.39	Q
2	B	Michelle Carter	United States	19.22			19.22	Q
3	B	Gong Lijiao	China	19.11			19.11	Q
4	A	Anita Márton	Hungary	17.40	18.85		18.85	Q
5	B	Natallia Mikhnevich	Belarus	17.97	18.17	18.57	18.57	Q
6	A	Cleopatra Borel	Trinidad and Tobago	17.01	18.55		18.55	Q
7	A	Aliona Dubitskaya	Belarus	17.95	18.51		18.51	Q
8	B	Natalia Ducó	Chile	17.84	18.29	x	18.29	q
9	A	Gao Yang	China	17.97	18.18	18.21	18.21	q
10	B	Jeneva Stevens	United States	17.81	17.77	18.05	18.05	q
11	B	Yuliya Leantsiuk	Belarus	17.58	17.96	x	17.96	q
12	A	Paulina Guba	Poland	17.46	17.55	17.73	17.73	q
13	A	Tia Brooks	United States	17.71	x	x	17.71	
14	A	Chiara Rosa	Italy	x	17.54	x	17.54	
15	A	Geisa Arcanjo	Brazil	17.26	17.02	17.42	17.42	
16	B	Guo Tianqian	China	17.10	x	16.98	17.10	
17	B	Yaniuvis López	Cuba	16.85	17.10	16.94	17.10	
18	B	Leila Rajabi	Iran	17.04	x	x	17.04	
19	A	Halyna Obleshchuk	Ukraine	16.97	16.74	16.12	16.97	
20	A	Auriol Dongmo Mekemnang	Cameroon	16.46	16.85	x	16.85	NR
21	B	Ahymara Espinoza	Venezuela	16.53	16.76	x	16.76	
22	A	Danniel Thomas	Jamaica	x	16.62	x	16.62	
23	B	Úrsula Ruiz	Spain	16.36	16.26	x	16.36	
24	B	Keely Medeiros	Brazil	x	14.69	15.17	15.17	

=== Final ===
The final was held at 20:05.

Rank	Athlete	Nationality	#1	#2	#3	#4	#5	#6	Result	Notes
1st place, gold medalist(s)	Christina Schwanitz	Germany	19.80	20.00	20.37	x	20.10	x	20.37	
2nd place, silver medalist(s)	Gong Lijiao	China	20.30	20.05	20.25	x	x	19.91	20.30	
3rd place, bronze medalist(s)	Michelle Carter	United States	19.45	19.76	18.57	18.85	19.48	19.71	19.76	
4	Anita Márton	Hungary	18.02	18.23	18.06	19.48	18.89	19.11	19.48	NR
5	Gao Yang	China	18.15	18.09	17.84	19.04	x	x	19.04	PB
6	Aliona Dubitskaya	Belarus	18.21	x	18.52	17.43	x	x	18.52	
7	Yuliya Leantsiuk	Belarus	17.38	18.25	17.67	17.85	x	17.85	18.25	
8	Natallia Mikhnevich	Belarus	17.05	18.09	17.75	18.11	17.79	18.24	18.24	
9	Natalia Ducó	Chile	17.94	17.95	17.98				17.98	
10	Jeneva Stevens	United States	16.79	17.44	17.84				17.84	
11	Paulina Guba	Poland	17.04	17.52	17.11				17.52	
12	Cleopatra Borel	Trinidad and Tobago	17.43	x	16.85				17.43	
