= 2015 World Championships in Athletics – Men's 400 metres =

Men's 400 metres at the 2015 World Championships
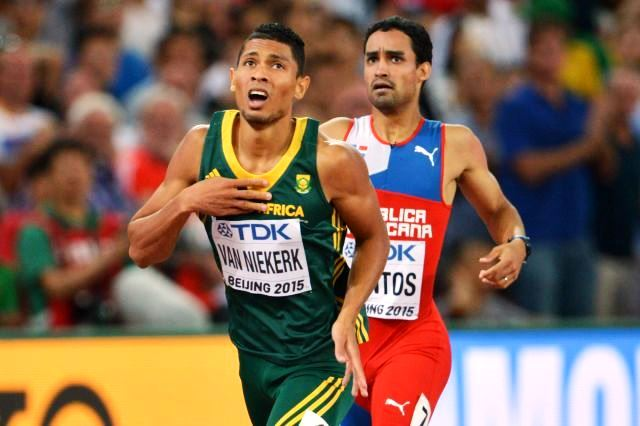
- Wayde van Niekerk fourth fastest in history
- Venue: Beijing National Stadium
- Dates: 23 August (heats); 24 August (semifinals); 26 August (final)
- Competitors: 44 from 27 nations
- Winning time: 43.48

Medalists
| gold medal | Wayde van Niekerk | South Africa |
| silver medal | LaShawn Merritt | United States |
| bronze medal | Kirani James | Grenada |

The men's 400 metres at the 2015 World Championships in Athletics was held at the Beijing National Stadium on 23, 24 and 26 August. The winning margin was 0.17 seconds.

== Summary ==
Since 2008, all of the major gold medals had been won by either reigning Olympic champion Kirani James or defending champion LaShawn Merritt. In the final, both were out ahead, along with Wayde van Niekerk and Isaac Makwala, Africans with none of those credentials. Through the final turn, van Niekerk took sole possession of the lead, Makwala passed James to hit the home stretch with a slight advantage in second. Far off the pace was Luguelín Santos. Down the home stretch, Makwala was unable to hold his position and was passed by a burst from James. James was unable to hold that burst, Merritt cruised past James but was unable to make any headway on van Niekerk's lead. Merritt made a desperate lean that actually cost him time but was well beaten, Santos followed Merritt down the home stretch to take fourth beating the National Record he set in the semi-final round. van Niekerk's 43.48 improved upon his own African Record, putting him at number 4 on the all-time list. For the first time in history, three men broke 44 seconds. Merritt set the fastest non-winning time of all time at 43.65 seconds. In fact, places 2, 3 and 4 were all the fastest ever in that position.

== Records ==
Prior to the competition, the records were as follows:

| World record | Michael Johnson (USA) | 43.18 | Sevilla, Spain | 26 August 1999 |
| Championship record | Michael Johnson (USA) | 43.18 | Sevilla, Spain | 26 August 1999 |
| World Leading | Isaac Makwala (BOT) | 43.72 | La Chaux-de-Fonds, Switzerland | 5 July 2015 |
| African Record | Isaac Makwala (BOT) | 43.72 | La Chaux-de-Fonds, Switzerland | 5 July 2015 |
| Asian Record | Abdelalelah Haroun (QAT) | 44.27 | La Chaux-de-Fonds, Switzerland | 5 July 2015 |
| NACAC record | Michael Johnson (USA) | 43.18 | Seville, Spain | 26 August 1999 |
| South American Record | Sanderlei Parrela (BRA) | 44.29 | Seville, Spain | 26 August 1999 |
| European Record | Thomas Schönlebe (GDR) | 44.33 | Rome, Italy | 3 September 1987 |
| Oceanian record | Darren Clark (AUS) | 44.38 | Seoul, South Korea | 26 September 1988 |
The following records were established during the competition:
| Asian Record | Yousef Masrahi (KSA) | 43.93 | Beijing, China | 23 August 2015 |
| World Leading | Wayde van Niekerk (RSA) | 43.48 | Beijing, China | 26 August 2015 |
| African Record | Wayde van Niekerk (RSA) | 43.48 | Beijing, China | 26 August 2015 |

== Qualification standards ==
Entry standards
45.50

== Schedule ==
| Date | Time | Round |
|---|---|---|
| 23 August 2015 | 11:10 | Heats |
| 24 August 2015 | 20:05 | Semifinals |
| 26 August 2015 | 21:25 | Final |

All times are local times (UTC+8)

== Results ==
| KEY: | Q | Qualified | q | Fastest non-qualifiers | NR | National record | PB | Personal best | SB | Seasonal best |

=== Heats ===
Qualification: Best 3 (Q) and next 6 fastest (q) qualify for the next round.

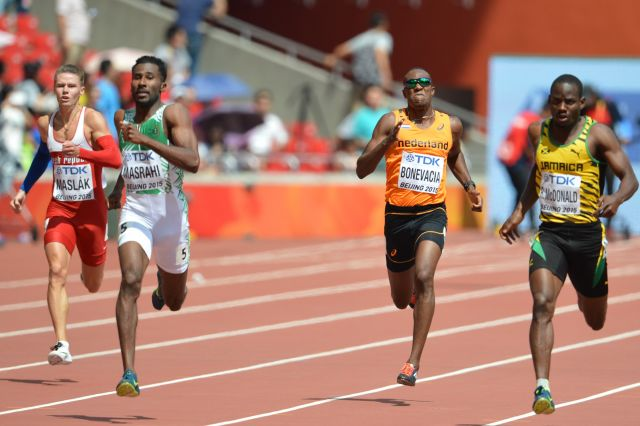
Heat 2

| Rank | Heat | Name | Nationality | Time | Notes |
|---|---|---|---|---|---|
| 1 | 2 | Yousef Masrahi | Saudi Arabia | 43.93 | Q, AR |
| 2 | 2 | Rusheen McDonald | Jamaica | 43.93 | Q, NR |
| 3 | 2 | Isaac Makwala | Botswana | 44.19 | Q |
| 4 | 6 | Wayde van Niekerk | South Africa | 44.42 | Q |
| 5 | 1 | David Verburg | United States | 44.43 | Q |
| 6 | 2 | Martyn Rooney | Great Britain & N.I. | 44.45 | q, PB |
| 7 | 3 | LaShawn Merritt | United States | 44.51 | Q |
| 8 | 1 | Machel Cedenio | Trinidad and Tobago | 44.54 | Q |
| 8 | 6 | Renny Quow | Trinidad and Tobago | 44.54 | Q, SB |
| 10 | 4 | Kirani James | Grenada | 44.56 | Q |
| 11 | 4 | Luguelín Santos | Dominican Republic | 44.62 | Q |
| 12 | 6 | Bryshon Nellum | United States | 44.65 | Q, PB |
| 13 | 1 | Jonathan Borlée | Belgium | 44.67 | Q, SB |
| 14 | 6 | Chris Brown | Bahamas | 44.68 | q |
| 15 | 1 | Peter Matthews | Jamaica | 44.69 | q, PB |
| 16 | 2 | Liemarvin Bonevacia | Netherlands | 44.72 | q, NR |
| 17 | 3 | Javon Francis | Jamaica | 44.83 | Q |
| 18 | 4 | Lalonde Gordon | Trinidad and Tobago | 44.97 | Q |
| 19 | 3 | Kevin Borlée | Belgium | 45.01 | Q, SB |
| 20 | 3 | Michael Mathieu | Bahamas | 45.07 | q |
| 21 | 3 | Nery Brenes | Costa Rica | 45.08 | q |
| 22 | 2 | Pavel Maslák | Czech Republic | 45.16 | |
| 23 | 4 | Onkabetse Nkobolo | Botswana | 45.17 | PB |
| 24 | 5 | Rabah Yousif | Great Britain & N.I. | 45.24 | Q |
| 25 | 1 | Pavel Ivashko | Russia | 45.25 | PB |
| 25 | 6 | Winston George | Guyana | 45.25 | NR |
| 27 | 5 | Steven Gardiner | Bahamas | 45.26 | Q |
| 28 | 1 | Luka Janežič | Slovenia | 45.28 | NR |
| 28 | 1 | Alberth Bravo | Venezuela | 45.28 | |
| 30 | 4 | Hederson Estefani | Brazil | 45.36 | SB |
| 31 | 6 | Hugo de Sousa | Brazil | 45.42 | SB |
| 32 | 4 | Jarryd Dunn | Great Britain & N.I. | 45.49 | |
| 33 | 5 | Vernon Norwood | United States | 45.53 | Q |
| 34 | 5 | Mame-Ibra Anne | France | 45.55 | |
| 35 | 6 | Gustavo Cuesta | Dominican Republic | 45.59 | |
| 36 | 5 | Abubakar Abbas | Bahrain | 45.64 | |
| 37 | 3 | Yuzo Kanemaru | Japan | 45.65 | |
| 38 | 3 | Aliaksandr Linnik | Belarus | 45.79 | |
| 39 | 4 | Vitaliy Butrym | Ukraine | 45.88 | |
| 40 | 5 | Alphas Kishoyian | Kenya | 46.02 | |
| 41 | 1 | Bralon Taplin | Grenada | 46.27 | |
| 42 | 3 | Guo Zhongze | China | 46.42 | |
| 43 | 5 | Mohamed Khouaja | Libya | 46.50 | SB |
| 44 | 5 | Berend Koekemoer | South Africa | 46.52 | |
| | 2 | Donald Sanford | Israel | DNS | |

=== Semifinals ===
Qualification: Best 2 (Q) and next 2 fastest (q) qualify for the next round.

| Rank | Heat | Name | Nationality | Time | Notes |
|---|---|---|---|---|---|
| 1 | 2 | Isaac Makwala | Botswana | 44.11 | Q |
| 2 | 1 | Kirani James | Grenada | 44.16 | Q |
| 3 | 1 | Luguelín Santos | Dominican Republic | 44.26 | Q, NR |
| 4 | 3 | Wayde van Niekerk | South Africa | 44.31 | Q |
| 5 | 3 | LaShawn Merritt | United States | 44.34 | Q, SB |
| 6 | 2 | Yousef Masrahi | Saudi Arabia | 44.40 | Q |
| 7 | 2 | Rabah Yousif | Great Britain & N.I. | 44.54 | q, PB |
| 8 | 3 | Machel Cedenio | Trinidad and Tobago | 44.64 | q |
| 9 | 2 | Lalonde Gordon | Trinidad and Tobago | 44.70 | |
| 10 | 1 | David Verburg | United States | 44.71 | |
| 11 | 1 | Kevin Borlée | Belgium | 44.74 | SB |
| 12 | 3 | Javon Francis | Jamaica | 44.77 | |
| 12 | 2 | Bryshon Nellum | United States | 44.77 | |
| 14 | 3 | Jonathan Borlée | Belgium | 44.85 | |
| 15 | 2 | Rusheen McDonald | Jamaica | 44.86 | |
| 16 | 1 | Renny Quow | Trinidad and Tobago | 44.98 | |
| 16 | 2 | Steven Gardiner | Bahamas | 44.98 | |
| 18 | 1 | Vernon Norwood | United States | 45.07 | |
| 18 | 1 | Chris Brown | Bahamas | 45.07 | |
| 20 | 3 | Martyn Rooney | Great Britain & N.I. | 45.29 | |
| 21 | 2 | Nery Brenes | Costa Rica | 45.41 | |
| 22 | 1 | Peter Matthews | Jamaica | 45.42 | |
| 23 | 3 | Michael Mathieu | Bahamas | 45.43 | |
| 24 | 3 | Liemarvin Bonevacia | Netherlands | 45.65 | |

=== Final ===
The final was held at 21:25.

| Rank | Lane | Name | Nationality | Time | Notes |
|---|---|---|---|---|---|
| 1st place, gold medalist(s) | 6 | Wayde van Niekerk | South Africa | 43.48 | WL, AR |
| 2nd place, silver medalist(s) | 8 | LaShawn Merritt | United States | 43.65 | PB |
| 3rd place, bronze medalist(s) | 5 | Kirani James | Grenada | 43.78 | SB |
| 4 | 7 | Luguelín Santos | Dominican Republic | 44.11 | NR |
| 5 | 4 | Isaac Makwala | Botswana | 44.63 | |
| 6 | 3 | Rabah Yousif | Great Britain & N.I. | 44.68 | |
| 7 | 2 | Machel Cedenio | Trinidad and Tobago | 45.06 | |
| 8 | 9 | Yousef Masrahi | Saudi Arabia | 45.15 | |
