= Botswana at the 2015 World Championships in Athletics =

- WA code: BOT

in Beijing
- Competitors: 5
- Medals: Gold 0 Silver 0 Bronze 0 Total 0

World Championships in Athletics appearances
- 1983; 1987; 1991; 1993; 1995; 1997; 1999; 2001; 2003; 2005; 2007; 2009; 2011; 2013; 2015; 2017; 2019; 2022; 2023

Botswana competed at the 2015 World Championships in Athletics in Beijing, China, from 22 to 30 August 2015.

== Results ==
(q – qualified, NM – no mark, SB – season best)

=== Men ===
Track and road events

Athlete	Event	Heat		Semifinal		Final	
Athlete	Event	Result	Rank	Result	Rank	Result	Rank
Isaac Makwala	400 metres	44.19	3 Q	44.11	1 Q	44.63	5
Onkabetse Nkobolo	400 metres	45.17 PB	23	Did not advance			
Nijel Amos	800 metres	1:47.23	16 Q	1:47.96	17	Did not advance	
Onkabetse Nkobolo; Nijel Amos; Leaname Maotoanong; Isaac Makwala	4 × 400 metres relay	2:59.95 NR	9	—		Did not advance	

Field events

Athlete	Event	Qualification		Final	
Athlete	Event	Distance	Position	Distance	Position
Kabelo Kgosiemang	High jump	2.22	28	Did not advance	
