= France at the 2015 World Championships in Athletics =

- WA code: FRA

in Beijing
- Competitors: 36
- Medals Ranked 31st: Gold 0 Silver 0 Bronze 2 Total 2

World Championships in Athletics appearances
- 1976; 1980; 1983; 1987; 1991; 1993; 1995; 1997; 1999; 2001; 2003; 2005; 2007; 2009; 2011; 2013; 2015; 2017; 2019; 2022; 2023; 2025

France competed at the 2015 World Championships in Athletics in Beijing, China, from 22 to 30 August 2015.

== Medalists ==
Medal	Athlete	Event	Date
Bronze	Renaud Lavillenie	Pole vault	24 August
Bronze	Alexandra Tavernier	Hammer throw	27 August

== Results ==
(q – qualified, NM – no mark, SB – season best)

=== Men ===
Track and road events

Athlete	Event	Heat		Semifinal		Final	
Athlete	Event	Result	Rank	Result	Rank	Result	Rank
Jimmy Vicaut	100 metres	9.92	3 Q	9.99	7 q	10.00	8
Christophe Lemaitre	100 metres	10.24	32 Q	10.20	20	did not advance	
Christophe Lemaitre	200 metres	20.29	15 Q	20.34	15	did not advance	
Jeffrey John	200 metres	20.48	29	did not advance			
Mame-Ibra Anne	400 metres	45.55	34	did not advance			
Pierre-Ambroise Bosse	800 metres	1:47.89	23 Q	1:45.02	5 q	1:46.63	5
Morhad Amdouni	1500 metres	3:39.38	15 Q	3:37.79	9	did not advance	
Dimitri Bascou	110 metres hurdles	13.29	4 Q	13.16 PB	4 Q	13.17	5
Garfield Darien	110 metres hurdles	13.43	11 Q	13.25	8 q	13.34	8
Pascal Martinot-Lagarde	110 metres hurdles	13.35	7 Q	13.17	6 q	13.17	4
Yoann Kowal	3000 metres steeplechase	8:41.65	20	—N/a		did not advance	
Guy-Elphege Anouman; Emmanuel Biron; Christophe Lemaitre; Jimmy Vicaut	4 × 100 metres relay	37.88 SB	2 Q	—N/a		38.23	5
Mame-Ibra Anne; Teddy Atine-Venel; Mamoudou Hanne; Thomas Jordier	4 × 400 metres relay	2:59.42 SB	6 Q	—N/a		3:00-65	6
Kevin Campion	20 kilometres walk	—N/a				1:25.16	33

Field events

Athlete	Event	Qualification		Final	
Athlete	Event	Distance	Position	Distance	Position
Renaud Lavillenie	Pole vault	5.70	1 Q	5.80	3rd place, bronze medalist(s)
Kévin Menaldo	Pole vault	5.70	14 Q	5.80	6
Kafétien Gomis	Long jump	8.09	7 q	8.02	7
Benjamin Compaoré	Triple jump	16.82	8 q	16.63	12

Combined events – Decathlon

Athlete	Event	100 m	LJ	SP	HJ	400 m	110H	DT	PV	JT	1500 m	Final	Rank
Bastien Auzeil	Result	11.22	7.26	15.38	2.01 SB	48.66 PB	14.71	42.63	5.10	55.14	4:37.92 PB	8093	13
Bastien Auzeil	Points	812	876	813	813	877	885	718	941	665	693	8093	13

=== Women ===
Track and road events

Athlete	Event	Heat		Semifinal		Final	
Athlete	Event	Result	Rank	Result	Rank	Result	Rank
Marie Gayot	400 metres	51.24 PB	15 Q	50.97 PB	12	did not advance	
Floria Gueï	400 metres	50.89 PB	10 Q	51.30	15	did not advance	
Rénelle Lamote	800 metres	2:00.20.	8 q	1:58.86 PB	9 Q	1:59.70	8
Cindy Billaud	100 metres hurdles	13.23	28	did not advance			
Aurélie Chaboudez	400 metres hurdles	56.19	19 q	56.13	15	did not advance	
Stella Akakpo; Céline Distel-Bonnet; Lénora Guion-Firmin; Maroussia Paré	4 × 100 metres relay	43.58 SB	14	—N/a		did not advance	
Marie Gayot; Floria Gueï; Estelle Perrossier; Agnès Raharolahy	4 × 400 metres relay	3:24.86 SB	6 Q	—N/a		3:26.45	7
Emilie Menuet	20 kilometres walk	—N/a				1:36.17	31

Field events

Athlete	Event	Qualification		Final	
Athlete	Event	Distance	Position	Distance	Position
Marion Lotout	Pole vault	4.30	21	did not advance	
Jeanine Assani Issouf	Triple jump	14.04	9 q	14.12	9
Mélina Robert-Michon	Discus throw	61.78	9 q	60.92	10
Alexandra Tavernier	Hammer throw	74.39 PB	2 Q	74.02	3rd place, bronze medalist(s)
