= Citius Mag =

Track and field magazine

- Website type: Track and field magazine
- Available in: English
- Founded: 2016
- Country of origin: United States
- Founder: Chris Chavez
- Website: https://citiusmag.com/

Citius Mag is an American online sports magazine covering track and field. The outlet publishes podcasts, videos, articles, newsletters, and social media content including race coverage and analysis and athlete interviews. The outlet has been described by The New York Times as a "track and field news website" that "focuses on running news".

== History and coverage ==
The name "citius" means "faster" in Latin and is the first word of the Olympic motto "Citius, Altius, Fortius". The magazine's stated mission is to "make it easier (and way more fun) to be a track fan."

Chris Chavez, a former Sports Illustrated writer, founded Citius in 2016 before working for the outlet full-time beginning in 2021. The staff has included runners Jasmine Fehr, Mac Fleet, Dana Giordano, Katelyn Hutchison, David Melly, and Jasmine Todd. Kyle Merber previously served as the Director of Partnerships and writer of The Lap Count newsletter.

Citius covers professional, NCAA, and U.S. high school track and field. Its eponymous podcast features interviews with elite athletes as well as league owners like Alexis Ohanian and Michael Johnson. Citius also produces events, which have featured public figures like Malcolm Gladwell, and sponsored content with running brands such as Brooks.

In April 2024, Citius released the first look at Nike uniforms for Team USA track and field at the 2024 Summer Olympics which received national press coverage due to criticisms of a leotard.

Grand Slam Track's bankruptcy filings in December 2025 show the league owing Citus Mag more than $270,000 for services Citius describes as including digital strategy, production, streaming, and social media content.
