= Felipe dos Santos (decathlete) =

Brazilian decathlete

Felipe Vinícius dos Santos
Personal information
- Nationality: Brazilian
- Born: 30 July 1994 (age 32) São Paulo, Brazil
- Height: 1.80 m (5 ft 11 in)
- Weight: 83 kg (183 lb)

Sport
- Sport: Track and field
- Event: Decathlon
- Club: Pinheiros-SP
- Coached by: Rodrigo Dario
- Updated on 3 September 2015

Felipe Vinícius dos Santos (born 30 July 1994) is a Brazilian athlete competing in the decathlon.

In 2015, he competed at the Pan American Games in Toronto, Canada and he also competed at the Championships in Athletics in Beijing, China.

He qualified to represent Brazil at the 2020 Summer Olympics.

== Competition record ==
| Year | Competition | Venue | Position | Event | Notes |
Representing Brazil
| 2011 | World Youth Championships | Villeneuve-d'Ascq, France | 3rd | Octathlon | 5966 pts PB |
| 2012 | World Junior Championships | Barcelona, Spain | 11th | Decathlon (junior) | 7280 pts |
| 2013 | Pan American Junior Championships | Medellín, Colombia | 1st | Decathlon (junior) | 7762 pts AJR |
| 2014 | Ibero-American Championships | São Paulo, Brazil | 1st | Decathlon | 7810 pts PB |
| 2015 | Pan American Games | Toronto, Canada | 4th | Decathlon | 8019 pts PB |
| 2015 | World Championships | Beijing, China | — | Decathlon | DNF |
| 2018 | South American Games | Cochabamba, Bolivia | 3rd | 4 × 100 m relay | 39.54 |
| 2018 | South American Games | Cochabamba, Bolivia | 3rd | Decathlon | 7739 pts |
| 2018 | Ibero-American Championships | Trujillo, Peru | 1st | Decathlon | 7663 pts |
| 2021 | South American Championships | Guayaquil, Ecuador | 2nd | Decathlon | 7960 pts |
| 2021 | Olympic Games | Tokyo, Japan | 18th | Decathlon | 7880 pts |
| 2022 | South American Indoor Championships | Cochabamba, Bolivia | 1st | Heptathlon | 5799 pts |
| 2022 | South American Games | Asunción, Paraguay | 1st | Decathlon | 7692 pts |
| 2023 | Pan American Games | Santiago, Chile | – | Decathlon | DNF |
| 2026 | Ibero-American Championships | Lima, Peru | 1st | Decathlon | 7684 pts |
| 2026 | South American Games | Santa Fe, Argentina | 2nd | Decathlon | 7656 pts |

== Personal bests ==
Outdoor
- 100 metres – 10.37 (+1.4 m/s) (Toronto 2015)
- 400 metres – 47.73 (São Paulo 2014)
- 1000 metres – 2:44.38 (Lille 2011)
- 1500 metres – 4:39.82 (São Paulo 2013)
- 110 metres hurdles – 13.74 (+0.5 m/s) (São Paulo 2015)
- High jump – 2.07 (São Paulo 2020)
- Pole vault – 4.95 (Bragança Paulista 2021)
- Long jump – 7.64 (-1.4 m/s) (São Paulo 2020)
- Shot put – 14.52 (Santa Fe 2026)
- Discus throw – 43.67 (São Paulo 2021)
- Javelin throw – 61.33 (Bragança Paulista 2022)
- Decathlon – 8364 (São Paulo 2020)

Indoor
- 60 metres – 6.85 (Prague 2014)
- 1000 metres – 2:50.02 (Tallinn 2014)
- 60 metres hurdles – 8.00 (Tallinn 2014)
- High jump – 2.01 (Tallinn 2014)
- Pole vault – 5.10 (Bragança Paulista 2020)
- Long jump – 7.44 (Tallinn 2014)
- Shot put – 14.08 (Bratislava 2014)
- Heptathlon – 5765 (Tallinn 2014)

== See also ==
- Brazil at the 2015 World Championships in Athletics
