= Trevell Quinley =

American long jumper

Personal information
- Born: 16 January 1983 (age 43) Santa Clara, California, U.S.
- Home town: San Jose, California
- Education: Arizona State University
- Height: 6 ft 6 in (198 cm)
- Weight: 200 lb (91 kg)

Sport
- Country: United States
- Sport: Track and Field
- Event: Long jump
- College team: Arizona State Sun Devils
- Club: Nike; Adidas
- Turned pro: 2005
- Retired: 2012

Achievements and titles
- Personal best: Long jump: 8.36 m (27 ft 5 in)
Medal record
Men's athletics
Representing the United States
World Junior Championships
Bronze medal – third place	2002 Kingston	Long jump

Trevell Quinley (born January 16, 1983, in Santa Clara, California) is an American long jumper and competitor in the 2008 Summer Olympics. Quinley won the bronze medal at the 2002 World Junior Championships. At the 2007 World Championships he reached the final, but registered three invalid jumps and ended without a result.

== Professional career ==
His June 2007 performance in Indianapolis included a jump of 8.22 meters (26 feet 11.75 inches), his personal best until the 2008 Olympic trials in Eugene, Oregon. There, he jumped 8.36 meters (27 feet 5.25 inches) in his third jump, setting a new lifetime personal best. He competed at the 2008 Olympic Games without reaching the final.

Representing the United States
Year	Competition	Venue	Position	Event	Notes
2002	World Junior Championships	Kingston, Jamaica	3rd	Long jump	7.71 m (25 ft 3 1/2 in)
2007	World Athletics Championships	Osaka, Japan	12th	Long jump	NM in Final
2008	World Athletics Indoor Championships	Valencia, Spain	13th	Long jump	7.60 m (24 ft 11 in)
2008	Summer Olympics	Beijing, China	19th	Long jump	7.87 m (25 ft 9 3/4 in)
2011	World Athletics Championships	Daegu, South Korea	31st	Long jump	7.09 m (23 ft 3 in)

== NCAA ==
Quinley is a two-time NCAA Division I All-American in long jump at Arizona State University.

== Prep ==
Quinley attended Merrill F. West High School in Tracy, California and won the CIF California State Meet Long Jump Championships in 2001. Quinley is a 2001 long jump CIF California State Meet champion as a senior 7.47 m (24 ft 6 in), state finalist in the 300m hurdles, section champion in the long jump and runner-up in the 110m and 300m hurdles. Quinley is a league champion in the long jump and both hurdle races.
