= Jasmine Todd =

American track and field athlete (born 1993)

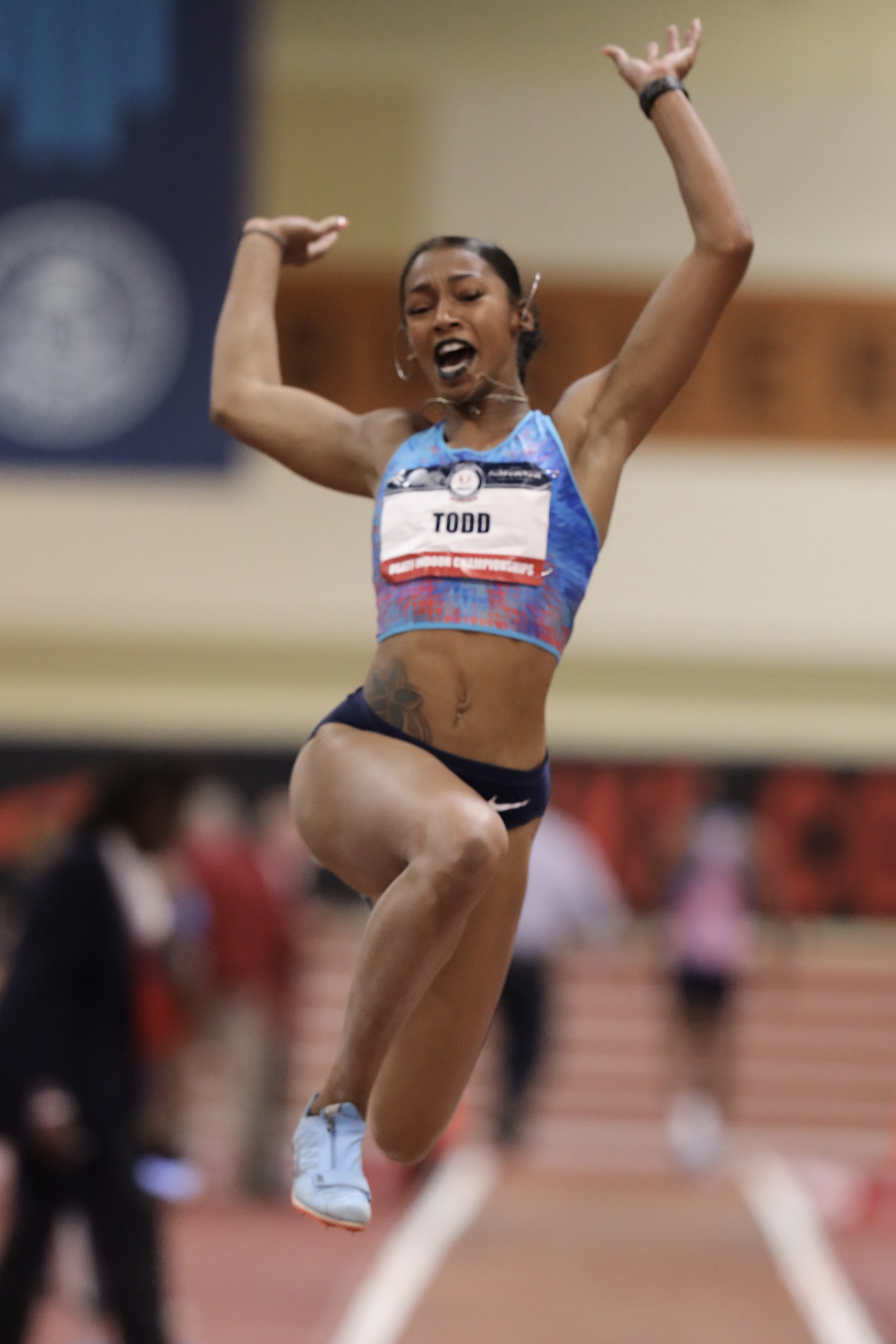
- Jasmine Todd

Personal information
- Born: December 23, 1993 (age 32) San Diego, California
- Height: 5 ft 5 in (165 cm)

Sport
- Country: United States
- Sport: Track and field
- Event(s): Long jump, sprints, 200 metres, 100 metres,
- College team: Oregon Ducks
- Club: ALTIS
- Turned pro: 2016

Achievements and titles
- Personal best(s): Long jump: 6.84 m 100 m dash: 10.92 sec
Medal record
Women's athletics
Representing the United States
World Championships
	2019 Doha	Long Jump
Silver medal – second place	2015 Beijing	4×100 m relay
The Match Europe v USA
	2019 Minsk, Belarus	Long Jump

Jasmine Todd (born December 23, 1993) is an American track and field athlete who competes in the long jump and short sprinting events. She holds personal bests of 6.84 m (22 ft 5 1/4 in) for the long jump and 10.92 seconds for the 100-meter dash.

She competed for the Oregon Ducks college team and has won several NCAA All-American honours. She was third in the 100 m and fourth in the long jump at the USA Outdoor Track and Field Championships in 2015.

== Prep career ==
Jasmine Todd was born to Larry and Kim Todd in San Diego, California and raised in Chandler, Arizona. She grew up in a sporting family, as both her parents had been track athletes at college. She too took up track and field and while at Chandler High School she won titles in the long jump, triple jump and 100-meter dash.

Jasmine Todd claimed seven individual titles as Chandler Wolves swept four straight Arizona Interscholastic Association team crowns during her prep career. Todd won three straight AIA triple jump titles (2009, 2010, 2011) and two straight long jump crowns (2010, 2011).

Todd as a senior in 2012 prior to her injury, recorded a high school best 20 feet 1.5 inches (6.134 m) in the long jump, which ranked 8th nationally among high school athletes.

As a junior in 2011, Todd set the Arizona record in the triple jump 41 feet 5 inches (12.62 m) in 2011. That was the No. 5 prep triple jump nationally in 2011. Also ranked 10th nationally in the long jump with a leap of 18 feet 10.75 inches (5.7595 m).

As a sophomore in 2010, Todd won the Arizona state long jump title with a personal best leap of 19 feet 11 inches (6.07 m). That was the 8th-best mark nationally among high school track and field student-athletes in 2010. Todd claimed AIA 100 meter state title.

As a freshman in 2009, Todd won AIA triple jump state title. Todd claimed AIA 100 meter state division I title.

High School Bests: 100 meters – 11.64w, 2011; Long jump – 20 feet 1.5 inches (6.134 m), 2012; Triple jump – 41 feet 5 inches (12.62 m), 2011; 60 metres – 7.42 (i), 2012.

== College career ==
She began a psychology major at the University of Oregon but missed most of the 2012 and 2013 collegiate track seasons due to an injury.

Todd quickly established herself among the nation's top collegiate athletes in 2014. At the 2014 NCAA Division I Indoor Track and Field Championships she was sixth in the long jump and third in the 60-meter dash with a best of 7.16 seconds. This time ranked her in the top fifteen athletes globally for the year. She won the 100 m dash at the Mt. SAC Relays with a personal record of 11.25 seconds and won the 4×100-meter relay with an Oregon team of Marybeth Sant, Phyllis Francis and Jenna Prandini. She placed fourth in the long jump at the Pac-12 Conference championships. She improved her long jump best to 6.50 m (21 ft 3 3/4 in) that year, placing her in the global top thirty for the season.

Todd was again third in the 60 m dash at the 2015 NCAA Indoor Championships, but managed only eleventh in the long jump. She also won the regional Mountain Pacific Sports Federation title in the 60 m dash. At that year's Pac-12 championships she won the 100 m and triple jump – in a best of 13.10 m (42 ft 11 1/2 in) – as well as coming runner-up in the long jump. She was eliminated in the semi-finals of the 100 m at the 2015 NCAA Division I Outdoor Track and Field Championships, but placed well in the long jump, taking fourth. The Oregon Ducks team was disqualified in the relay final. She hit new heights at the 2015 USA Outdoor Track and Field Championships, established herself as one of the country's best track and field performers. She came a surprise third in the 100 m in a new best of 10.92 seconds. Another best followed in the long jump, where she took fourth through a mark of 6.84 m (22 ft 5 1/4 in). These placings brought her selection for both events at the 2015 World Championships in Athletics.

Todd graduated in May 2016 from Oregon and finished her career in a Duck uniform after the team won outdoor track and field Pac-12 Conference title. Todd placed twelfth in long jump in 6.04 m (19 ft 9 3/4 in) and twentieth in 100 meters in 11.30 at 2016 United States Olympic Trials (track and field).

== Professional career ==
In October 2016, Jasmine Todd joined Altis in Phoenix. In 2022, Todd joined Citius Mag.

Year	Competition	Venue	Position	Event	Notes
2010	USATF National Junior Olympic Track & Field Championships	Sacramento, California	8th	Long jump	5.54 m (18 ft 2 in)
2011	USA Junior Outdoor Track and Field Championships	Eugene, Oregon	7th	Long jump	5.97 m (19 ft 7 in)
2011	USA Junior Outdoor Track and Field Championships	Eugene, Oregon	10th	Triple jump	11.92 m (39 ft 1 1/4 in)
2011	USA Youth Outdoor Track and Field Championships	Myrtle Beach, South Carolina	1st	Long jump	5.68 m (18 ft 7 1/2 in)
2011	USA Youth Outdoor Track and Field Championships	Myrtle Beach, South Carolina	1st	Triple jump	11.90 m (39 ft 1/2 in)
2015	USA Outdoor Track and Field Championships	Eugene, Oregon	4th	Long jump	6.84 m (22 ft 5 1/4 in)
2015	USA Outdoor Track and Field Championships	Eugene, Oregon	3rd	100 m	10.92
2016	2016 United States Olympic Trials (track and field)	Eugene, Oregon	12th	Long jump	6.04 m (19 ft 9 3/4 in)
2016	2016 United States Olympic Trials (track and field)	Eugene, Oregon	20th	100 m	11.30
2017	USA Outdoor Track and Field Championships	Sacramento, California	23rd	100 m	11.29
2017	USA Outdoor Track and Field Championships	Sacramento, California	7th	Long jump	6.57 m (21 ft 6 1/2 in)
2018	USA Indoor Track and Field Championships	Albuquerque, New Mexico	5th	Long jump	6.34 m (20 ft 9 1/2 in)
2018	USA Indoor Track and Field Championships	Albuquerque, New Mexico	5th	60 meters	7.36
2018	USA Outdoor Track and Field Championships	Des Moines, Iowa	4th	Long jump	6.44 m (21 ft 1 1/2 in)
2019	USA Outdoor Track and Field Championships	Des Moines, Iowa	2nd	Long jump	6.79 m (22 ft 3 1/4 in)
2019	USA Outdoor Track and Field Championships	Des Moines, Iowa	18th	100 m	11.65
2020	USA Indoor Track and Field Championships	Albuquerque, New Mexico	6th	Long jump	6.30 m (20 ft 8 in)
2020	USA Indoor Track and Field Championships	Albuquerque, New Mexico	13th	60 meters	7.51
2021	United States Olympic Trials	Eugene, Oregon	8th	Long jump	6.65 m (21 ft 9 3/4 in)
2022	USA Outdoor Track and Field Championships	Eugene, Oregon	14th	Long jump	6.19 m (20 ft 3 1/2 in)
2023	USA Outdoor Track and Field Championships	Eugene, Oregon	6th	Long jump	6.54 m (21 ft 5 1/4 in)

== Personal records ==
- 100-meter dash – 10.92 seconds (2015)
- 200-meter dash – 22.89 seconds (2015)
- Long jump – 6.84 m (22 ft 5 1/4 in) (2015)
- Triple jump – 13.10 m (42 ft 11 1/2 in) (2015)
- 60-meter dash indoor – 7.15 seconds (2015)
- 200-meter dash indoor – 23.87 seconds (2014)
- Long jump – 6.50 m (21 ft 3 3/4 in) (2014)
- Triple jump – 12.60 m (41 ft 4 in) (2015)

== Personal life ==
In 2023, Jasmine Todd was elected to the World Athletics Commission.

Todd is Catholic.
