= Athletics at the 2015 Pan American Games – Men's decathlon =

Men's decathlon at the 2015 Pan American Games
- Venue: CIBC Pan Am and Parapan Am Athletics Stadium
- Dates: July 22 – July 23
- Competitors: 12 from 6 nations
- Winning score: 8659

Medalists
Gold medal	Damian Warner	Canada
Silver medal	Kurt Felix	Grenada
Bronze medal	Luiz Alberto de Araújo	Brazil

The men's decathlon competition of the athletics events at the 2015 Pan American Games took place between the 22 and 23 of July at the CIBC Pan Am and Parapan Am Athletics Stadium. The defending Pan American Games champion at the time was Leonel Suárez from Cuba.

== Records ==
Prior to this competition, the existing world and Pan American Games records were as follows:

World record	Ashton Eaton (USA)	9039	Eugene, Oregon, United States	June 23, 2012
Pan American Games record	Maurice Smith (JAM)	8278	Rio de Janeiro, Brazil	July 24, 2007

== Qualification ==
Each National Olympic Committee (NOC) was able to enter up to two entrants providing they had met the minimum standard (7063) in the qualifying period (January 1, 2014 to June 28, 2015).

== Schedule ==
Date	Time	Round
July 22, 2015	10:10	100 metres
July 22, 2015	10:50	Long jump
July 22, 2015	12:05	Shot put
July 22, 2015	18:10	High jump
July 22, 2015	19:52	400 metres
July 23, 2015	10:05	110 metres hurdles
July 23, 2015	10:55	Discus throw
July 23, 2015	12:15	Pole vault
July 23, 2015	17:35	Javelin throw
July 23, 2015	20:50	1500 metres
July 23, 2015	20:50	Final standings

== Results ==
All times shown are in seconds.

KEY:	PR	Pan Am record	NR	National record	PB	Personal best	SB	Seasonal best	DB	Decathlon best

=== 100 m ===
Wind: +1.4 (both races)

Rank	Heat	Name	Nationality	Time	Points	Notes
1	2	Damian Warner	Canada	10.28	1028	
2	2	Felipe dos Santos	Brazil	10.37	1006	
3	2	Yordanis García	Cuba	10.80	906	
3	1	Rodrigo Sagaon	Mexico	10.80	906	
5	2	Luiz Alberto de Araújo	Brazil	10.81	903	
6	2	Austin Bahner	United States	10.87	890	
7	2	Kurt Felix	Grenada	10.91	881	
8	1	Lindon Victor	Grenada	10.99	863	
9	1	Roman Garibay	Mexico	11.12	834	
10	1	Leonel Suárez	Cuba	11.22	812	
11	1	Derek Masterson	United States	11.43	767	
12	1	Pat Arbour	Canada	11.53	746	

=== Long jump ===
Rank	Name	Nationality	#1	#2	#3	Mark	Wind	Points	Notes
1	Damian Warner	Canada	7.68	x	7.55	7.68	+2.4	980	
2	Kurt Felix	Grenada	7.17	7.54	7.48	7.54	+3.8	945	
3	Luiz Alberto de Araújo	Brazil	7.53	7.30	x	7.53	+2.8	942	
4	Felipe dos Santos	Brazil	7.52	x	7.45	7.52	+2.1	940	
5	Austin Bahner	United States	7.27	x	7.02	7.27	+1.4	878	
6	Pat Arbour	Canada	7.15	x	6.70	7.15	+2.8	850	
7	Leonel Suárez	Cuba	6.83	7.11	x	7.11	+2.7	840	
8	Lindon Victor	Grenada	6.50	6.91	6.88	6.91	+3.2	792	
9	Yordanis García	Cuba	6.89	6.41	x	6.89	+4.1	788	
10	Roman Garibay	Mexico	6.82	4.90	6.77	6.82	+2.0	771	
11	Derek Masterson	United States	6.49	6.01	6.18	6.49	+3.2	695	
12	Rodrigo Sagaon	Mexico	6.33	x	x	6.33	+2.2	659	

=== Shot put ===
Rank	Name	Nationality	#1	#2	#3	Mark	Points	Notes
1	Kurt Felix	Grenada	14.30	15.15	15.23	15.23	804	
2	Luiz Alberto de Araújo	Brazil	14.48	14.77	15.16	15.16	800	
3	Yordanis García	Cuba	x	14.29	14.91	14.91	784	
4	Lindon Victor	Grenada	14.72	14.75	x	14.75	774	
5	Derek Masterson	United States	14.58	x	14.38	14.58	764	
6	Pat Arbour	Canada	x	14.56	14.40	14.56	763	
7	Leonel Suárez	Cuba	13.46	13.74	14.43	14.43	755	
8	Damian Warner	Canada	14.33	14.36	14.13	14.36	750	
9	Roman Garibay	Mexico	13.71	13.78	14.23	14.23	742	
10	Felipe dos Santos	Brazil	14.16	13.93	14.22	14.22	742	
11	Rodrigo Sagaon	Mexico	12.12	12.60	13.18	13.18	678	
12	Austin Bahner	United States	12.26	12.47	12.46	12.47	635	

=== High jump ===
Rank	Group	Name	Nationality	1.64	1.67	1.70	1.73	1.76	1.79	1.82	1.85	1.88	1.91	1.94	1.97	2.00	2.03	2.06	2.09	2.12	Mark	Points	Notes
1	A	Kurt Felix	Grenada										o			o		o	o	xxx	2.09	887	
2	A	Felipe dos Santos	Brazil									o	o	o	o	xo	o	xxx			2.03	831	
3	B	Luiz Alberto de Araújo	Brazil							o		o	xo	o	o	xxo	xxx				2.00	803	
4	A	Damian Warner	Canada									o	o	o	xo	xxx					1.97	776	
5	A	Leonel Suárez	Cuba								xo		o		xxo	xxx					1.97	776	
6	B	Pat Arbour	Canada							o	o	o	o	o	xxx						1.94	749	
7	A	Lindon Victor	Grenada										o	xxo	xxx						1.94	749	
8	B	Derek Masterson	United States							o	xxo	o	xxx								1.88	696	
9	A	Yordanis García	Cuba								o		xxx								1.85	670	
10	B	Roman Garibay	Mexico					o		xo	o	xxx									1.85	670	
11	B	Austin Bahner	United States					xo	o	xo	xo	xxx									1.85	670	
12	B	Rodrigo Sagaon	Mexico	o	o	o	o	xxo	xo	xxo	xxx										1.82	644	

=== 400 metres ===
Rank	Heat	Name	Nationality	Time	Points	Notes
1	2	Damian Warner	Canada	47.66	926	
2	2	Felipe dos Santos	Brazil	48.65	878	
3	2	Rodrigo Sagaon	Mexico	49.00	861	
4	2	Yordanis García	Cuba	49.60	833	
5	2	Kurt Felix	Grenada	49.67	830	
6	2	Luiz Alberto de Araújo	Brazil	49.91	819	
7	2	Austin Bahner	United States	50.36	798	
8	1	Leonel Suárez	Cuba	50.94	772	
9	1	Roman Garibay	Mexico	52.06	722	
10	1	Lindon Victor	Grenada	52.18	717	
11	1	Derek Masterson	United States	52.32	711	
12	1	Pat Arbour	Canada	53.69	652	

=== 110 metres hurdles ===
Rank	Heat	Name	Nationality	Time	Wind	Points	Notes
1	2	Damian Warner	Canada	13.44	+2.0	1048	DB
2	2	Yordanis García	Cuba	14.06	+2.0	967	
3	2	Felipe dos Santos	Brazil	14.10	+2.0	962	
4	2	Luiz Alberto de Araújo	Brazil	14.29	+2.0	937	
5	2	Leonel Suárez	Cuba	14.41	+2.0	922	
6	1	Kurt Felix	Grenada	14.71	+2.4	885	
7	1	Rodrigo Sagaon	Mexico	14.75	+2.4	880	
8	1	Pat Arbour	Canada	15.15	+2.4	831	
9	1	Derek Masterson	United States	15.20	+2.4	825	
10	1	Roman Garibay	Mexico	15.41	+2.4	801	
11	1	Austin Bahner	United States	15.74	+2.4	762	
12	1	Lindon Victor	Grenada	15.85	+2.4	750	

=== Discus throw ===
Rank	Name	Nationality	#1	#2	#3	Mark	Points	Notes
1	Lindon Victor	Grenada	x	x	49.80	49.80	866	
2	Pat Arbour	Canada	48.23	48.80	47.33	48.80	845	
3	Damian Warner	Canada	41.04	47.56	47.17	47.56	820	
4	Derek Masterson	United States	44.80	47.50	46.07	47.50	818	
5	Luiz Alberto de Araújo	Brazil	x	39.82	46.16	46.16	791	
6	Leonel Suárez	Cuba	35.58	44.07	45.02	45.02	767	
7	Kurt Felix	Grenada	44.24	44.54	x	44.54	757	
8	Roman Garibay	Mexico	37.40	x	44.51	44.51	757	
9	Felipe dos Santos	Brazil	37.60	42.38	x	42.38	713	
10	Austin Bahner	United States	42.35	x	x	42.35	712	
11	Yordanis García	Cuba	x	41.87	x	41.87	703	
	Rodrigo Sagaon	Mexico	x	x	x	NM	0	

=== Pole vault ===
Rank	Name	Nationality	3.80	3.90	4.00	4.10	4.20	4.30	4.40	4.50	4.60	4.70	4.80	4.90	Mark	Points	Notes
1	Derek Masterson	United States							xo	o	o	xo	o	xxx	4.80	849	
2	Luiz Alberto de Araújo	Brazil									xo	o	xxx		4.70	819	
3	Yordanis García	Cuba							xxo		xxo	o	xxx		4.70	819	
4	Austin Bahner	United States							o		o		xxx		4.60	790	
5	Kurt Felix	Grenada						xo		o	o	xxx			4.60	790	
6	Damian Warner	Canada							o		xxo	xxx			4.60	790	
7	Felipe dos Santos	Brazil							xo	o	xxx				4.50	760	
8	Pat Arbour	Canada				o	o	o	xxx						4.30	702	
9	Roman Garibay	Mexico	o		xo	o	o	xxx							4.20	673	
10	Rodrigo Sagaon	Mexico	o		xo		xxx								4.00	617	
10	Lindon Victor	Grenada			xo	xxx									4.00	617	
	Leonel Suárez	Cuba							xxx						NM	0	

=== Javelin throw ===
Rank	Name	Nationality	#1	#2	#3	Mark	Points	Notes
1	Lindon Victor	Grenada	x	64.89	66.97	66.97	843	
2	Roman Garibay	Mexico	64.09	65.78	63.32	65.78	825	
3	Pat Arbour	Canada	54.60	56.14	65.03	65.03	814	
4	Kurt Felix	Grenada	64.10	x	x	64.10	800	
5	Yordanis García	Cuba	58.08	55.58	61.73	61.73	764	
6	Damian Warner	Canada	59.55	61.53	59.09	61.53	761	
7	Rodrigo Sagaon	Mexico	51.91	56.77	x	56.77	689	
8	Luiz Alberto de Araújo	Brazil	53.45	56.36	x	56.36	683	
9	Derek Masterson	United States	55.06	54.22	55.30	55.30	667	
10	Austin Bahner	United States	52.75	53.32	54.67	54.67	658	
11	Felipe dos Santos	Brazil	46.90	46.52	47.88	47.88	557	
	Leonel Suárez	Cuba				DNS	0	

=== 1500 metres ===
Rank	Name	Nationality	Time	Points	Notes
1	Damian Warner	Canada	4:24.73	780	
2	Rodrigo Sagaon	Mexico	4:33.00	725	
3	Kurt Felix	Grenada	4:38.39	690	
4	Yordanis García	Cuba	4:39.30	685	
5	Luiz Alberto de Araújo	Brazil	4:39.77	682	
6	Austin Bahner	United States	4:43.53	658	
7	Derek Masterson	United States	4:45.81	644	
8	Felipe dos Santos	Brazil	4:48.14	630	
9	Roman Garibay	Mexico	4:49.12	624	
10	Pat Arbour	Canada	5:01.70	550	
11	Lindon Victor	Grenada	5:14.03	482	
	Leonel Suárez	Cuba	DNS	0	

=== Final standings ===
Rank	Athlete	Nationality	Points	Notes
1st place, gold medalist(s)	Damian Warner	Canada	8659	PR NR
2nd place, silver medalist(s)	Kurt Felix	Grenada	8269	PB
3rd place, bronze medalist(s)	Luiz Alberto de Araújo	Brazil	8179	SB
4	Felipe dos Santos	Brazil	8019	PB
5	Yordanis García	Cuba	7919	
6	Pat Arbour	Canada	7502	SB
7	Lindon Victor	Grenada	7453	PB
8	Austin Bahner	United States	7451	
9	Derek Masterson	United States	7436	
10	Roman Garibay	Mexico	7419	PB
11	Rodrigo Sagaon	Mexico	6659	
	Leonel Suárez	Cuba	DNF	
