= Peter Rapp =

German long jumper (born 1983)

Peter Rapp (born 29 May 1983) is a German long jumper.

He finished eighth at the 2002 World Junior Championships and twelfth at the 2005 Summer Universiade, and competed at the 2008 World Indoor Championships without reaching the final.

His personal best jump is 8.10 metres, achieved in July 2007 in Ebensee.
