= Saudi Arabia at the 2009 World Championships in Athletics =

- WA code: KSA

in Berlin
- Competitors: 9
- Medals: Gold 0 Silver 0 Bronze 0 Total 0

World Championships in Athletics appearances
- 1991; 1993; 1995; 1997; 1999; 2001; 2003; 2005; 2007; 2009; 2011; 2013; 2015; 2017; 2019; 2022; 2023

Saudi Arabia competed at the 2009 World Championships in Athletics in Berlin from 15–23 August 2009.

== Team selection ==
Track and road events

Event	Athletes	
Event	Men	Women
200 metres	Hamed Hamadan Al-Bishi	
400 metres	Yousef Ahmed Masrahi	
800 metres	Ali Al-Deraan; Mohammed Al-Salhi	
1500 metres	Mohammed Shaween	
5000 metres	Hussain Jamaan Alhamdah	

Field and combined events

Event	Athletes	
Event	Men	Women
Long jump	Mohamed Salman Al-Khuwalidi; Hussein Taher Al-Sabee	
Shot put	Sultan Abdulmajeed Al-Hebshi	

== Results ==
Track and road events

Event	Athletes	Heats		Quarterfinals		Semifinal		Final	
Event	Athletes	Result	Rank	Result	Rank	Result	Rank	Result	Rank
200 m	Hamed Hamadan Al-Bishi	21.00	32	did not advance					
400 m	Yousef Ahmed Masrahi	47.03	42	-		did not advance			
800 m	Ali Al-Deraan	DNS		-		did not advance			
800 m	Mohammed Al-Salhi	1:48.43	37	-		did not advance			
1500 m	Mohammed Shaween	3:49.03	44	-		did not advance			
5000 m	Hussain Jamaan Alhamdah	13:44.59	26	-				did not advance	

Field and combined events

Event	Athletes	Qualification		Final	
Event	Athletes	Result	Rank	Result	Rank
Long jump	Mohamed Salman Al-Khuwalidi	7.66 SB	36	did not advance	
Long jump	Hussein Taher Al-Sabee	7.99	16	did not advance	
Shot put	Sultan Abdulmajeed Al-Hebshi	20.04	13	did not advance	
