= Jeremy Taiwo =

American decathlete (born 1990)

Personal information
- Born: January 15, 1990 (age 36) Ballard, Washington
- Height: 6 ft 4 in (1.93 m)
- Weight: 195 lb (88 kg)

Sport
- Country: United States
- Sport: Athletics
- Event(s): Decathlon, Heptathlon
- College team: Washington Huskies
- Turned pro: 2013
- Coached by: Atanas Atanassov

Achievements and titles
- Personal best(s): Decathlon – 8,425 (2016); Heptathlon – 6,344 (2015)

Jeremy Taiwo (born January 15, 1990, in Ballard, Washington) is an American decathlete. His father, Joseph Taiwo, is a Nigerian former triple jumper who competed at the 1984 and 1988 Summer Olympics. His mother Irene is Colombian and a lawyer In Seattle for the National Relations Board.

Taiwo qualified for the USA team on July 3, 2016, at the Eugene Track and Field Hayward Field TrackTown USA qualifying matches. He scored a total of 8425 points for a silver medal. 325 points behind Ashton Eaton.

== Prep ==
He was educated at Newport High School and the University of Washington, and competed in college athletics for the Washington Huskies.

== Major competition record ==
He competed at the 2013 World Championships in Moscow, Russia and 2015 World Championships in Beijing China.

Year	Competition	Venue	Position	Event	Notes
2016	2016 Olympics	Brazil	11th	Decathlon	8300
2015	2015 World Championships	Beijing National Stadium	DNF	Decathlon	
2013	2013 World Championships	Luzhniki Stadium	DNF	Decathlon	

=== USA National Track and field Championships ===
Year	Competition	Venue	Position	Event	Notes
2016	USA Track and Field Olympic Trials	Eugene, Oregon	2nd	Decathlon	8425
2015	USA Outdoor Track and Field Championships	Eugene, Oregon	2nd	Decathlon	8264
2015	USA Indoor Track and Field Championships	Boston, MA	1st	Heptathlon	6273
2013	USA Outdoor Track and Field Championships	Des Moines, Iowa	3rd	Decathlon	7925

== Personal bests ==
Event	Result	Venue	Year
Decathlon	8,425	Eugene (USA)	2016
Heptathlon	6,344	Seattle (USA)	2015
60m indoor	7.02	Nampa (USA)	2013
100m	10.84 +1.4	Eugene (USA)	2013
400m	47.83	Eugene (USA)	2015
1500m	4:16.34	Eugene (USA)	2013
60m Hurdles indoor	7.87	Boston (USA)	2015
110m Hurdles indoor	14.16 +2.8	Eugene (USA)	2013
High Jump indoor	2.25 m (7 ft 5 in)	Nampa (USA)	2013
Pole Vault	5.00 m (16 ft 5 in)	Eugene (USA)	2013
Long Jump	7.57 m (24 ft 10 in)	Götzis (AUT)	2015
Triple Jump	15.04 m (49 ft 4 in)	Seattle (USA)	2009
Shot Put	14.93 m (49 ft 0 in)	Eugene (USA)	2015
Discus Throw	44.27 m (145 ft 3 in)	Chula Vista (USA)	2015
Javelin Throw	53.71 m (176 ft 3 in)	Eugene (USA)	2009
