= Pau Tonnesen =

Spanish decathlete (born 1992)

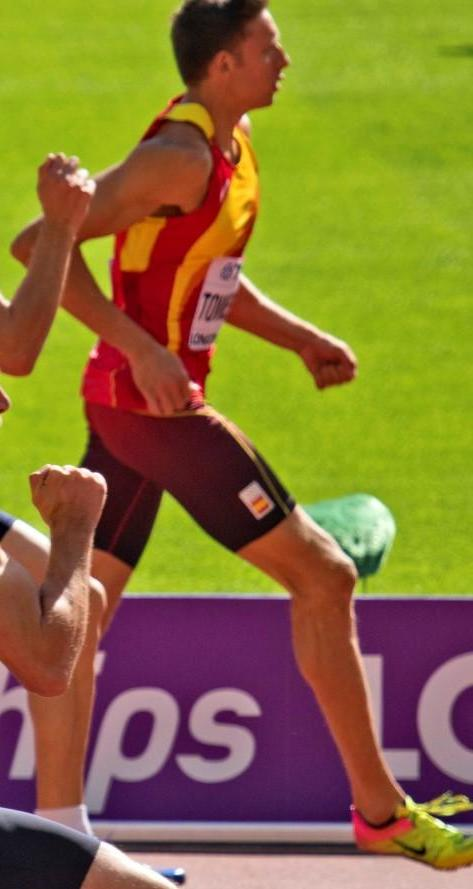
- Pau Tonnesen in 2017

Personal information
- Full name: Pau Gaspar Tonnesen Ricart
- Born: 24 October 1992 (age 33) Tempe, Arizona, United States
- Height: 1.96 m (6 ft 5 in)
- Weight: 89 kg (196 lb)

Sport
- Country: Spain
- Sport: Track and field
- Event: Decathlon
- Updated on 29 August 2015

Pau Gaspar Tonnesen Ricart (born 24 October 1992) is a male decathlete representing Spain. His mother is Spanish and his father is American. He competed at the 2015 World Championships and the 2016 Summer Olympics.

== International competitions ==
Year	Competition	Venue	Position	Event	Notes
Representing Spain
2015	World Championships	Beijing, China	18th	Decathlon	7606 pts
2016	Olympic Games	Rio de Janeiro, Brazil	17th	Decathlon	7982 pts
2017	World Championships	London, United Kingdom	14th	Decathlon	8006 pts
