= Luiz Alberto de Araújo =

Brazilian decathlete (born 1987)

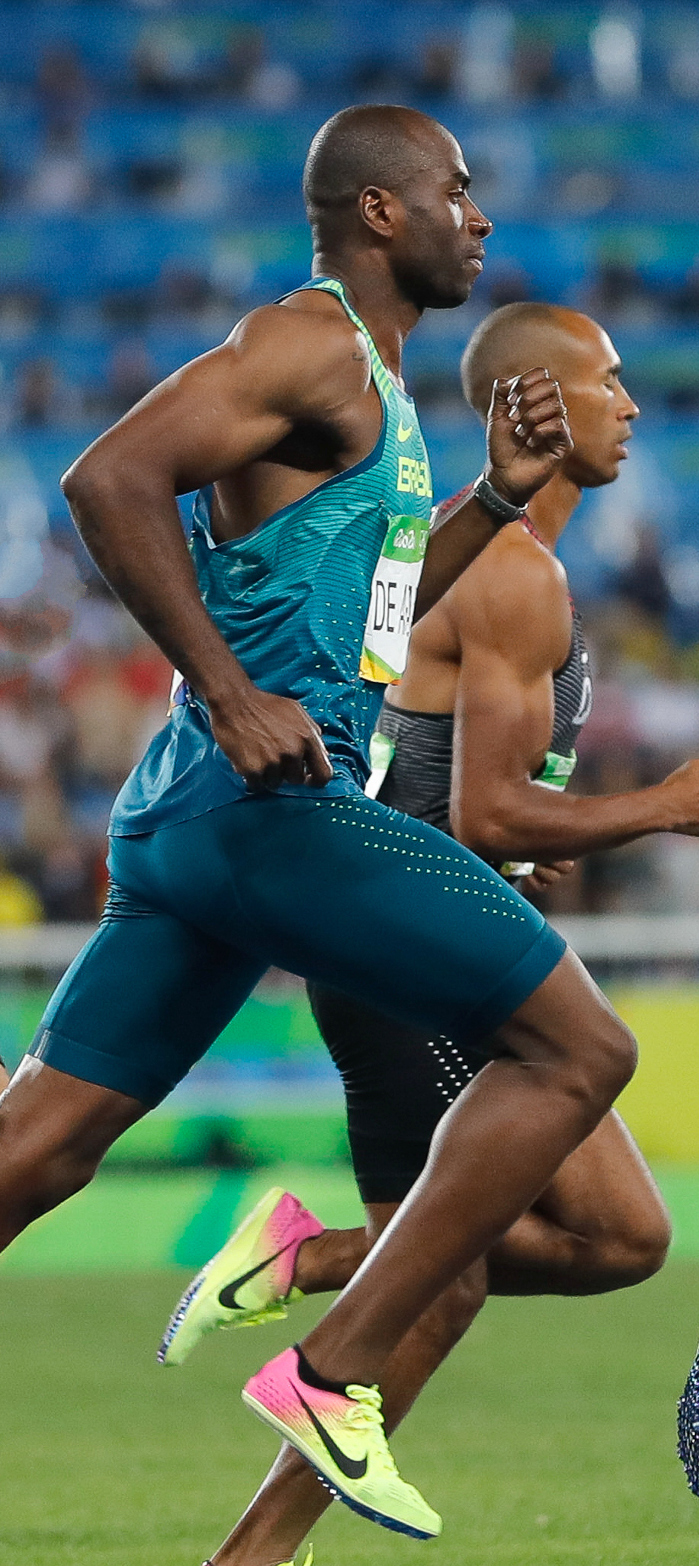
- De Araújo at the 2016 Olympics

Personal information
- Full name: Luiz Alberto Cardoso de Araújo
- Born: 27 June 1987 (age 39) Artur Nogueira, São Paulo, Brazil
- Height: 1.88 m (6 ft 2 in)
- Weight: 88 kg (194 lb)

Sport
- Sport: Athletics
- Event: Decathlon
- Club: BM&F Bovespa
- Coached by: Edemar Alves dos Santos
Medal record
Representing Brazil
Pan American Games
Bronze medal – third place	2015 Toronto	Decathlon
- Updated on 3 September 2015

Luiz Alberto Cardoso de Araújo (born 27 June 1987) is a Brazilian decathlete.

== Career ==
He broke the South American record in decathlon on 30 June 2012, with 8,276 points. In June 2013, Carlos Chinin broke his record, with the mark of 8,393 points.

He competed at the 2012 Summer Olympics, finishing 19th in decathlon with 7,849 points.

In 2015, he won bronze medal at the Pan American Games in Toronto, Ontario, Canada (8,179 points) and he competed at the 2015 World Championships in Beijing, China.

At the 2016 Summer Olympics, he broke 3 personal bests (7.48 in Long Jump, 48.14 in the 400m, and 57.28 m in the Javelin) and finished 10th with 8,315 points, his personal best, and the best campaign of a Brazilian at the Olympic Games in decathlon.

== Personal bests ==
- 100 m: 10.66 (wind: +1.9 m/s) – (Dominican Republic) Santo Domingo, 31 May 2008
- 400 m: 48.14 – (Brazil) Rio de Janeiro, 17 August 2016
- 1500 m: 4:27.75 – (Brazil) São Paulo, 30 June 2012
- 110 m hurdles: 13.94 (wind: +1.3 m/s) – (Brazil) São Paulo, 28 June 2008
- High jump: 2.00 m – (Canada) Toronto, 22 July 2015
- Pole vault: 5.00 m – (Brazil) São Bernardo do Campo, 9 April 2016
- Long jump: 7.48 m (wind: -0.2 m/s) – (Brazil) Rio de Janeiro, 17 August 2016
- Shot put: 15.64 m – (Brazil) São Paulo, 5 August 2011
- Discus throw: 48.89 m – (Brazil) Bragança Paulista, 15 September 2018
- Javelin throw: 59.22 m – (Brazil) Bragança Paulista, 15 September 2018
- Decathlon: 8315 pts – (Brazil) Rio de Janeiro, 17–18 August 2016

== Competition record ==
Year	Competition	Venue	Position	Event	Notes
Representing Brazil
2004	South American Youth Championships	Guayaquil, Ecuador	1st	Octathlon	5966 pts
2005	South American Junior Championships	Rosario, Argentina	2nd	Decathlon (junior)	7267 pts
2006	World Junior Championships	Beijing, China	6th	Decathlon (junior)	7472 pts
2006	South American Championships	Tunja, Colombia	–	Decathlon	DNF
2006	South American U23 Championships / South American Games	Buenos Aires, Argentina	2nd	Decathlon	7140 pts
2008	Pan American Combined Events Championships	Santo Domingo, Dominican Republic	4th	Decathlon	7733 pts
2008	South American U23 Championships	Lima, Peru	2nd	110 m hurdles	14.34 (wind: -2.5 m/s)
2010	Ibero-American Championships	San Fernando, Spain	1st	Decathlon	7816 pts
2011	South American Championships	Buenos Aires, Argentina	1st	Decathlon	7944 pts
2011	World Championships	Daegu, South Korea	16th	Decathlon	7902 pts
2011	Pan American Games	Guadalajara, Mexico	–	Decathlon	DNF
2012	Ibero-American Championships	Barquisimeto, Venezuela	1st	Decathlon	7772 pts
2012	Olympic Games	London, United Kingdom	19th	Decathlon	7849 pts
2014	South American Games	Santiago, Chile	1st	Decathlon	7733 pts
2015	South American Championships	Lima, Peru	1st	Decathlon	7799 pts
2015	Pan American Games	Toronto, Canada	3rd	Decathlon	8179 pts
2015	World Championships	Beijing, China	—	Decathlon	DNF
2016	Olympic Games	Rio de Janeiro, Brazil	10th	Decathlon	8315 pts
2017	World Championships	London, United Kingdom	–	Decathlon	DNF
2018	Ibero-American Championships	Trujillo, Peru	–	Decathlon	DNF
2019	South American Championships	Lima, Peru	–	Decathlon	DNF
