= Saudi Arabia at the 2015 World Championships in Athletics =

- WA code: KSA

in Beijing
- Competitors: 3
- Medals: Gold 0 Silver 0 Bronze 0 Total 0

World Championships in Athletics appearances
- 1991; 1993; 1995; 1997; 1999; 2001; 2003; 2005; 2007; 2009; 2011; 2013; 2015; 2017; 2019; 2022; 2023; 2025

Saudi Arabia competed at the 2015 World Championships in Athletics in Beijing, China, from 22 to 30 August 2015.

== Results ==
(q – qualified, NM – no mark, SB – season best)

=== Men ===
Track and road events

Athlete	Event	Heat		Semifinal		Final	
Athlete	Event	Result	Rank	Result	Rank	Result	Rank
Yousef Masrahi	400 metres	43.93 AR	1 Q	44.40	2 Q	45.15	8
Ali Al-Deraan	800 metres	1:47.65	3 Q	1:48.71	6	Did not advance	

Field events

Athlete	Event	Qualification		Final	
Athlete	Event	Distance	Position	Distance	Position
Ahmed Fayez Al-Dosari	Long jump	7.63	25	Did not advance	
