= Saudi Arabia at the 2011 World Championships in Athletics =

- WA code: KSA
- National federation: Saudi Arabian Athletics Federation
- Website: www.saaaf.com

in Daegu
- Competitors: 8
- Medals: Gold 0 Silver 0 Bronze 0 Total 0

World Championships in Athletics appearances
- 1991; 1993; 1995; 1997; 1999; 2001; 2003; 2005; 2007; 2009; 2011; 2013; 2015; 2017; 2019; 2022; 2023

The Kingdom of Saudi Arabia competed at the 2011 World Championships in Athletics from August 27 to September 4 in Daegu, South Korea.

== Team selection ==
A team of 11 athletes was announced to represent the country in the event.

The following athletes appeared on the preliminary Entry List, but not on the Official Start List of the specific event, resulting in a total number of 8 competitors:

KEY:	Did not participate	Competed in another event

	Event	Athlete
Men	400 metres	Yousef Ahmed Masrahi
Men	800 metres	Mohammed Al-Salhi
Men	4 x 400 metres relay	Abdullah Ahmed Abkar
Men	4 x 400 metres relay	Yonas Al-Hosah
Men	Shot put	Sultan Abdulmajeed Alhabashi

== Results ==
=== Men ===
Athlete	Event	Preliminaries		Heats		Semifinals		Final	
Athlete	Event	Time Width Height	Rank	Time Width Height	Rank	Time Width Height	Rank	Time Width Height	Rank
Mohammed Shaween	1500 metres			DNF		Did not advance			
Hussain Jamaan Alhamdah	5000 metres			13:35.47	6			13:34.83	13
Abdullah Abdulaziz Aljoud	5000 metres			DNF				Did not advance	
Ali Ahmed Al-Amri	3000 metres steeplechase			8:26.75 SB	16			Did not advance	
Ismael M.H. Al-Sabani; Yousef Ahmed Masrahi; Hamed Hamdan Al-Bishi; Mohammed Al-Salhi	4 x 400 metres relay			3:05.65 SB	16			Did not advance	
