= Ahmed Fayez Al-Dosari =

Saudi Arabian long jumper

Personal information
- Born: 3 July 1985 (age 40)

Sport
- Country: Saudi Arabia
- Sport: Track and field
- Event: Long jump
Medal record
Men's athletics
Representing Saudi Arabia
Asian Indoor Championships
| Silver medal – second place | 2004 Tehran | Long jump |
- Updated on 29 August 2015

Ahmed Fayez Al-Dosari (born 3 July 1985) is a Saudi Arabian long jumper. He competed at the 2015 World Championships in Beijing without qualifying for the final. He was a silver medallist at the 2004 Asian Indoor Athletics Championships and a bronze medallist at the 2015 Arab Athletics Championships.

His personal bests in the event are 8.12 metres outdoors (+1.4 m/s) (Al-Qatif 2002) and 7.76 metres indoors (Teheran 2004).

== Competition record ==
| Year | Competition | Venue | Position | Event | Notes |
Representing Saudi Arabia
| 2002 | Arab Junior Championships | Cairo, Egypt | 3rd | Long jump | 7.19 m |
| 2002 | World Junior Championships | Kingston, Jamaica | 4th | Long jump | 7.60 m |
| 2003 | Asian Championships | Manila, Philippines | 14th (q) | Triple jump | 15.05 m |
| 2004 | Asian Indoor Championships | Tehran, Iran | 2nd | Long jump | 7.76 m |
| 2015 | Arab Championships | Isa Town, Bahrain | 3rd | Long jump | 7.63 m (w) |
| 2015 | World Championships | Beijing, China | 25th (q) | Long jump | 7.63 m |

== See also ==
- Saudi Arabia at the 2015 World Championships in Athletics
