= Saudi Arabia at the 2019 World Athletics Championships =

- WA code: KSA

in Doha, Qatar 27 September 2019 – 6 October 2019
- Competitors: 3 in 3 events
- Medals: Gold 0 Silver 0 Bronze 0 Total 0

World Athletics Championships appearances
- 1991; 1993; 1995; 1997; 1999; 2001; 2003; 2005; 2007; 2009; 2011; 2013; 2015; 2017; 2019; 2022; 2023

Saudi Arabia competed at the 2019 World Athletics Championships in Doha, Qatar, from 27 September to 6 October 2019.

== Results ==
Key

- Q = Qualified for the next round
- q = Qualified for the next round as a fastest loser or, in field events, by position without achieving the qualifying target
- NR = National record
- PB = Personal best
- SB = Season best
- N/A = Round not applicable for the event

=== Men ===
Track and road events

Athlete	Event	Heat		Semifinal		Final	
Athlete	Event	Result	Rank	Result	Rank	Result	Rank
Fahhad Al-Subaie	200 metres	20.51	26	Did not advance			
Mazen Al-Yasen	400 metres	45.70	19 q	46.11	23	Did not advance	
Tariq Ahmed Al-Amri	5000 metres	14:21.19	33	—		Did not advance	
