= Hussain Al-Hamdah =

Saudi Arabian long-distance runner

Hussain Jamaan Alhamdah in 2011

Hussain Jamaan Alhamdah is a Saudi Arabian long-distance runner. At the 2012 Summer Olympics, he competed in the Men's 5000 metres, finishing 38th overall in Round 1, failing to qualify for the final.

== Doping ban ==
Alhamdah was handed a 30-month doping ban in 2013, after irregularities were found in his biological passport profile. His results from 2009 onwards were also annulled.
