= Saudi Arabia at the 2013 World Championships in Athletics =

- WA code: KSA

in Moscow
- Competitors: 11
- Medals: Gold 0 Silver 0 Bronze 0 Total 0

World Championships in Athletics appearances
- 1991; 1993; 1995; 1997; 1999; 2001; 2003; 2005; 2007; 2009; 2011; 2013; 2015; 2017; 2019; 2022; 2023

Saudi Arabia competed at the 2013 World Championships in Athletics in Moscow, Russia, from 10 to 18 August, 2013. A team of 11 athletes was announced to represent the country in the event.

== Results ==
(q – qualified, NM – no mark, SB – season best)

=== Men ===
Track and road events

Athlete	Event	Preliminaries		Heats		Semifinals		Final	
Athlete	Event	Time	Rank	Time	Rank	Time	Rank	Time	Rank
Yousef Ahmed Masrahi	400 metres								
Abdulaziz Ladan Mohammed	800 metres								
Emad Noor	1500 metres								
Fahhad Mohammed Al Subaie; Mohamed Ali Al-Bishi; Ismail M.H Alsabani; Mohammed Obaid Al-Salhi; Bandar Atiyah Kaabi; Yousef Ahmed Masrahi	4 × 400 metres relay								

Field events

Athlete	Event	Preliminaries		Final	
Athlete	Event	Width Height	Rank	Width Height	Rank
Sultan Abdulmajeed Alhabashi	Shot put				
Sultan Mubarak Al-Dawoodi	Discus throw				
