= Hungary at the 2015 World Championships in Athletics =

- WA code: HUN
- National federation: Magyar Atlétikai Szövetség
- Website: www.masz.hu

in Beijing
- Competitors: 12
- Medals: Gold 0 Silver 0 Bronze 0 Total 0

World Championships in Athletics appearances
- 1976; 1980; 1983; 1987; 1991; 1993; 1995; 1997; 1999; 2001; 2003; 2005; 2007; 2009; 2011; 2013; 2015; 2017; 2019; 2022; 2023; 2025

Hungary competed at the 2015 World Championships in Athletics in Beijing, China, from 22 to 30 August 2015.

== Results ==
(q – qualified, NM – no mark, SB – season best)

=== Men ===
Track and road events

Athlete	Event	Heat		Semifinal		Final	
Athlete	Event	Result	Rank	Result	Rank	Result	Rank
Balázs Baji	110 metres hurdles	13.45	17 Q	13.51	19	did not advance	

Field events

Athlete	Event	Qualification		Final	
Athlete	Event	Distance	Position	Distance	Position
Zoltán Kővágó	Discus throw	61.37	18	did not advance	
Bence Pásztor	Hammer throw	71.14	28	did not advance	
Krisztián Pars	Hammer throw	75.37	9 Q	77.32	4
Ákos Hudi	Hammer throw	71.15	27	did not advance	

=== Women ===
Track and road events

Athlete	Event	Heat		Semifinal		Final	
Athlete	Event	Result	Rank	Result	Rank	Result	Rank
Viktória Madarász	20 kilometres walk	—N/a				1:32:01	15

Field events

Athlete	Event	Qualification		Final	
Athlete	Event	Distance	Position	Distance	Position
Barbara Szabó	High jump	1.80	26	did not advance	
Anita Márton	Shot put	18.85	4 Q	19.48 NR	4
Éva Orbán	Hammer throw	68.26	19	did not advance	
Réka Gyurátz	Hammer throw	64.57	28	did not advance	

Combined events – Heptathlon

Athlete	Event	100H	HJ	SP	200 m	LJ	JT	800 m	Final	Rank
Xénia Krizsán	Result	13.70	1.80 SB	14.12	25.27	6.16 SB	49.17	2:13.36	6322 PB	9
Xénia Krizsán	Points	1021	978	802	862	899	844	916	6322 PB	9
Györgyi Zsivoczky-Farkas	Result	13.85 PB	1.86 PB	14.13	25.43 PB	6.29 SB	49.30 SB	2:14.71	6389 PB	6
Györgyi Zsivoczky-Farkas	Points	1000	1054	803	848	940	847	897	6389 PB	6
