= 2014 European Athletics Championships – Women's heptathlon =

Women's heptathlon at the 2014 European Athletics Championships
- Venue: Letzigrund
- Location: Zurich, Switzerland
- Dates: 14 August; 15 August
- Competitors: 24 from 15 nations
- Winning points: 6551

Medalists
gold medal	Antoinette Nana Djimou	France
silver medal	Nadine Broersen	Netherlands
bronze medal	Nafissatou Thiam	Belgium

The women's heptathlon at the 2014 European Athletics Championships took place at the Letzigrund on 14 and 15 August.

== Medalists ==
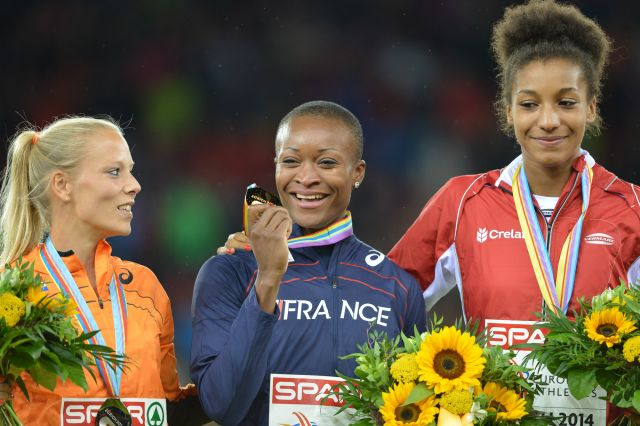
The podium

Gold	Antoinette Nana Djimou; France
Silver	Nadine Broersen; Netherlands
Bronze	Nafissatou Thiam; Belgium

== Records ==
Standing records prior to the 2014 European Athletics Championships
World record	Jackie Joyner-Kersee (USA)	7291 pts	Seoul, South Korea	24 September 1988
European record	Carolina Klüft (SWE)	7032 pts	Osaka, Japan	26 August 2007
Championship record	Jessica Ennis (GBR)	6823 pts	Barcelona, Spain	31 July 2010
World Leading	Katarina Johnson-Thompson (GBR)	6682 pts	Götzis, Austria	1 June 2014
European Leading	Katarina Johnson-Thompson (GBR)	6682 pts	Götzis, Austria	1 June 2014

== Schedule ==
Date	Time	Round
14 August 2014	10:30	100 metres hurdles
14 August 2014	12:05	High jump
14 August 2014	19:50	Shot put
14 August 2014	21:12	200 metres
15 August 2014	11:40	Long jump
15 August 2014	18:04	Javelin throw
15 August 2014	21:15	800 metres

All times are local times (UTC+2)

== Results ==
=== 100 metres hurdles ===
Wind:
Heat 1: +0.4 m/s, Heat 2: +0.6 m/s, Heat 3: +0.2 m/s

Rank	Heat	Lane	Name	Nationality	Time	Notes	Points
1	2	7	Antoinette Nana Djimou	France	13.05	SB	1117
2	3	6	Anastasiya Mokhnyuk	Ukraine	13.08	PB	1112
3	3	8	Carolin Schäfer	Germany	13.20	PB	1094
4	3	2	Grit Šadeiko	Estonia	13.28	PB	1083
5	3	7	Nadine Broersen	Netherlands	13.48		1053
6	3	5	Claudia Rath	Germany	13.54		1044
7	2	6	Karolina Tymińska	Poland	13.56		1041
8	2	3	Xénia Krizsán	Hungary	13.59		1037
9	3	4	Linda Züblin	Switzerland	13.60		1036
10	3	3	Laura Ikauniece-Admidina	Latvia	13.61		1034
11	2	4	Ellen Sprunger	Switzerland	13.65	SB	1028
12	2	5	Katsiaryna Netsviateyeva	Belarus	13.67	SB	1026
13	3	1	Anouk Vetter	Netherlands	13.68		1024
14	2	8	Valérie Reggel	Switzerland	13.79		1008
15	1	2	Lilli Schwarzkopf	Germany	13.87		997
16	1	4	Alina Fyodorova	Ukraine	14.01		977
16	1	6	Lucia Mokrášová	Slovakia	14.01		977
18	2	1	Nafissatou Thiam	Belgium	14.05		971
19	1	3	Györgyi Zsivoczky-Farkas	Hungary	14.06	SB	970
20	1	1	Jessica Samuelsson	Sweden	14.10		964
21	1	7	Mari Klaup	Estonia	14.17		954
22	1	5	Ida Marcussen	Norway	14.26		942
23	1	8	Yana Maksimava	Belarus	14.29		938
24	2	2	Eliška Klučinová	Czech Republic	14.40		923

=== High jump ===
Rank	Group	Name	Nationality	1.55	1.58	1.61	1.64	1.67	1.70	1.73	1.76	1.79	1.82	1.85	1.88	1.91	1.94	1.97	2.00	Result	Notes	Points	Overall
1	B	Nafissatou Thiam	Belgium	–	–	–	–	–	–	–	–	o	–	o	o	xo	xo	xxo	xxx	1.97	=WHB, NUR	1198	2169
2	B	Nadine Broersen	Netherlands	–	–	–	–	–	–	–	o	o	o	o	o	o	xo	xr		1.94	NR	1158	2211
3	B	Yana Maksimava	Belarus	–	–	–	–	–	–	–	o	o	o	o	xxo	xxx				1.88		1080	2018
4	B	Lilli Schwarzkopf	Germany	–	–	–	–	–	–	o	o	xo	o	o	xxx					1.85	PB	1041	2038
5	B	Laura Ikauniece-Admidina	Latvia	–	–	–	–	–	–	–	o	o	o	xxx						1.82		1003	2037
5	B	Carolin Schäfer	Germany	–	–	–	–	–	o	o	o	o	o	xxx						1.82		1003	2097
7	A	Györgyi Zsivoczky-Farkas	Hungary	–	–	–	–	o	–	o	o	xo	xo	xxx						1.82	SB	1003	1973
8	B	Anastasiya Mokhnyuk	Ukraine	–	–	–	–	–	–	o	o	xxo	xxo	xxx						1.82	PB	1003	2115
9	A	Claudia Rath	Germany	–	–	–	o	o	o	o	o	o	xxx							1.79		966	2010
10	B	Xénia Krizsán	Hungary	–	–	–	o	–	xo	o	xo	xo	xxx							1.79		966	2003
11	A	Anouk Vetter	Netherlands	–	–	–	–	o	o	o	o	xxo	xxx							1.79	SB	966	1990
12	A	Antoinette Nana Djimou	France	–	–	–	–	o	o	o	o	xxx								1.76	SB	928	2045
12	B	Alina Fyodorova	Ukraine	–	–	–	o	–	o	o	o	xxx								1.76		928	1905
12	A	Katsiaryna Netsviateyeva	Belarus	–	–	o	o	o	o	o	o	xxx								1.76		928	1954
15	A	Jessica Samuelsson	Sweden	–	–	–	o	o	o	xo	o	xxx								1.76	SB	928	1892
16	B	Mari Klaup	Estonia	–	–	–	–	o	o	o	xxo	xxx								1.76		928	1882
17	A	Grit Šadeiko	Estonia	–	–	–	o	o	xo	o	xxo	xxx								1.76		928	2011
18	A	Ellen Sprunger	Switzerland	–	–	–	o	o	o	o	xxx									1.73		891	1919
19	A	Ida Marcussen	Norway	–	–	–	–	o	o	xxo	xxx									1.73	SB	891	1833
20	B	Lucia Mokrášová	Slovakia	–	o	o	o	xo	o	xxx										1.70		855	1832
21	A	Valérie Reggel	Switzerland	o	–	o	xo	xo	o	xxx										1.70	PB	855	1863
22	A	Karolina Tymińska	Poland	–	–	o	o	xxo	xo	xxx										1.70		855	1896
23	A	Linda Züblin	Switzerland	o	o	xo	o	xo	xxx											1.67	SB	818	1854
	B	Eliška Klučinová	Czech Republic																	DNS		DNF	

=== Shot put ===
Rank	Group	Name	Nationality	#1	#2	#3	Result	Notes	Points	Overall
1	B	Jessica Samuelsson	Sweden	14.50	x	x	14.50		827	2719
2	B	Karolina Tymińska	Poland	13.98	14.47	13.62	14.47		825	2721
3	B	Lilli Schwarzkopf	Germany	13.92	13.76	14.44	14.44		823	2861
4	B	Katsiaryna Netsviateyeva	Belarus	14.42	14.33	14.41	14.42		822	2776
5	B	Antoinette Nana Djimou	France	14.13	14.35	13.64	14.35		817	2862
6	B	Nafissatou Thiam	Belgium	13.37	14.29	13.82	14.29		813	2982
7	B	Xénia Krizsán	Hungary	13.26	14.17	13.90	14.17		805	2808
8	B	Anouk Vetter	Netherlands	13.43	14.16	x	14.16		805	2795
9	B	Yana Maksimava	Belarus	12.67	13.86	13.64	13.86		785	2803
10	A	Valérie Reggel	Switzerland	13.70	13.56	13.31	13.70		774	2637
11	A	Anastasiya Mokhnyuk	Ukraine	13.69	x	13.17	13.69	PB	773	2888
12	A	Györgyi Zsivoczky-Farkas	Hungary	12.67	13.53	13.60	13.60		767	2740
13	A	Ellen Sprunger	Switzerland	12.89	13.24	13.42	13.42	PB	755	2674
14	A	Carolin Schäfer	Germany	13.37	13.02	x	13.37	SB	752	2849
15	B	Nadine Broersen	Netherlands	12.72	13.35	12.78	13.35		751	2962
16	A	Linda Züblin	Switzerland	13.17	12.53	x	13.17		739	2593
17	A	Mari Klaup	Estonia	11.90	13.16	12.39	13.16		738	2620
18	A	Claudia Rath	Germany	12.88	12.67	12.87	12.88		719	2729
19	A	Ida Marcussen	Norway	12.54	12.73	12.77	12.77		712	2545
20	B	Alina Fyodorova	Ukraine	12.76	-	-	12.76		711	2616
21	A	Lucia Mokrášová	Slovakia	12.44	12.58	12.69	12.69		707	2539
22	A	Laura Ikauniece-Admidina	Latvia	12.58	x	12.30	12.58		700	2737
23	A	Grit Šadeiko	Estonia	11.43	12.31	12.11	12.31		682	2693
	B	Eliška Klučinová	Czech Republic				DNS		0	DNF

=== 200 metres ===
Wind:
Heat 1: -0.8 m/s, Heat 2: -0.2 m/s, Heat 3: -0.5 m/s

Rank	Heat	Lane	Name	Nationality	Time	Notes	Points	Overall
1	3	2	Carolin Schäfer	Germany	23.84	PB	996	3845
2	3	8	Ellen Sprunger	Switzerland	24.17		964	3638
3	3	5	Lucia Mokrášová	Slovakia	24.31		951	3490
4	3	7	Claudia Rath	Germany	24.43		940	3669
5	2	1	Antoinette Nana Djimou	France	24.52	SB	931	3793
6	2	4	Grit Šadeiko	Estonia	24.56		928	3621
7	3	4	Anouk Vetter	Netherlands	24.61		923	3718
7	3	3	Karolina Tymińska	Poland	24.61		923	3644
9	2	8	Jessica Samuelsson	Sweden	24.74		911	3630
10	3	2	Laura Ikauniece-Admidina	Latvia	24.75		910	3647
11	2	7	Anastasiya Mokhnyuk	Ukraine	24.83		902	3790
12	3	6	Valérie Reggel	Switzerland	25.05		882	3519
13	2	3	Nadine Broersen	Netherlands	25.08		879	3841
14	2	6	Nafissatou Thiam	Belgium	25.19		869	3851
15	2	5	Katsiaryna Netsviateyeva	Belarus	25.23		866	3642
16	1	3	Xénia Krizsán	Hungary	25.37		853	3661
17	1	5	Ida Marcussen	Norway	25.73		821	3366
18	1	6	Mari Klaup	Estonia	25.83	SB	812	3432
19	1	8	Lilli Schwarzkopf	Germany	25.86		809	3670
20	1	1	Györgyi Zsivoczky-Farkas	Hungary	25.87		809	3549
21	1	2	Linda Züblin	Switzerland	26.02		795	3388
22	1	4	Yana Maksimava	Belarus	26.47		757	3580
	1	7	Alina Fyodorova	Ukraine	DNS		0	DNF
	2	2	Eliška Klučinová	Czech Republic	DNS		0	DNF

=== Long jump ===
Rank	Group	Name	Nationality	#1	#2	#3	Result	Notes	Points	Overall
1	B	Claudia Rath	Germany	6.31	6.32	x	6.32		949	4618
2	B	Carolin Schäfer	Germany	6.12	6.30	6.23	6.30	PB	943	4788
3	B	Antoinette Nana Djimou	France	5.86	6.25	6.10	6.25	SB	927	4720
4	B	Anastasiya Mokhnyuk	Ukraine	5.90	6.24	x	6.24		924	4714
5	A	Laura Ikauniece-Admidina	Latvia	6.11	6.02	6.20	6.20	SB	912	4559
6	B	Lilli Schwarzkopf	Germany	6.15	6.18	x	6.18		905	4575
6	B	Nafissatou Thiam	Belgium	6.18	x	5.97	6.18		905	4756
8	B	Nadine Broersen	Netherlands	6.16	x	x	6.16		899	4740
9	A	Valérie Reggel	Switzerland	x	x	6.14	6.14	PB	893	4412
10	B	Grit Šadeiko	Estonia	x	6.04	6.07	6.07		871	4492
10	A	Karolina Tymińska	Poland	6.07	6.03	6.04	6.07		871	4515
12	A	Ida Marcussen	Norway	x	x	6.05	6.05		865	4231
13	B	Anouk Vetter	Netherlands	x	5.96	6.04	6.04	PB	862	4580
14	A	Xénia Krizsán	Hungary	5.83	6.01	5.85	6.01	SB	853	4514
15	B	Linda Züblin	Switzerland	4.14	5.84	5.97	5.97		840	4228
16	A	Ellen Sprunger	Switzerland	5.90	5.91	5.95	5.95	SB	834	4472
17	B	Györgyi Zsivoczky-Farkas	Hungary	5.94	x	5.76	5.94		831	4380
18	A	Lucia Mokrášová	Slovakia	5.75	5.75	5.73	5.75		774	4264
19	A	Mari Klaup	Estonia	x	5.73	5.67	5.73	SB	768	4200
20	A	Yana Maksimava	Belarus	5.58	x	5.50	5.58		723	4283
21	A	Katsiaryna Netsviateyeva	Belarus	5.50	5.44	5.51	5.51		703	4345
22	B	Jessica Samuelsson	Sweden	x	r		NM		0	3630
	B	Alina Fyodorova	Ukraine				DNS		0	DNF
		Eliška Klučinová	Czech Republic				DNS		0	DNF

=== Javelin throw ===
Rank	Group	Name	Nationality	#1	#2	#3	Result	Notes	Points	Overall
1	B	Antoinette Nana Djimou	France	48.21	x	54.18	54.18		941	5661
2	B	Anouk Vetter	Netherlands	43.54	52.49	-	52.49	SB	908	5488
3	B	Nadine Broersen	Netherlands	x	41.50	52.18	52.18	SB	902	5642
4	B	Lilli Schwarzkopf	Germany	52.17	50.56	51.31	52.17		902	5477
5	B	Laura Ikauniece-Admidina	Latvia	47.84	50.00	51.30	51.30	SB	885	5444
6	A	Györgyi Zsivoczky-Farkas	Hungary	44.74	46.25	50.73	50.73	PB	874	5254
7	B	Nafissatou Thiam	Belgium	49.34	44.25	49.69	49.69		854	5610
8	B	Ida Marcussen	Norway	44.07	43.72	47.85	47.85		819	5050
9	B	Mari Klaup	Estonia	45.82	47.52	41.26	47.52		812	5012
10	B	Yana Maksimava	Belarus	45.80	42.26	42.30	45.80		779	5062
11	A	Linda Züblin	Switzerland	45.08	44.43	45.28	45.28		769	4997
12	A	Valérie Reggel	Switzerland	40.34	40.78	44.46	44.46	PB	753	5165
13	B	Carolin Schäfer	Germany	44.19	43.77	x	44.19		748	5536
14	A	Grit Šadeiko	Estonia	43.84	42.19	40.54	43.84		741	5233
15	B	Xénia Krizsán	Hungary	43.38	x	43.58	43.58		736	5250
16	A	Claudia Rath	Germany	42.20	43.45	x	43.45	PB	734	5352
17	A	Ellen Sprunger	Switzerland	41.06	38.20	x	41.06	SB	688	5160
18	A	Jessica Samuelsson	Sweden	39.17	41.01	38.74	41.01	SB	687	4317
19	A	Karolina Tymińska	Poland	38.04	40.60	38.33	40.60		679	5194
20	A	Katsiaryna Netsviateyeva	Belarus	40.38	38.65	x	40.38		675	5020
21	A	Lucia Mokrášová	Slovakia	36.73	38.73	x	38.73	PB	639	4903
22	A	Anastasiya Mokhnyuk	Ukraine	34.80	33.50	34.97	34.97		571	5285
		Alina Fyodorova	Ukraine				DNS		0	DNF
		Eliška Klučinová	Czech Republic				DNS		0	DNF

=== 800 metres ===
Rank	Heat	Name	Nationality	Time	Notes	Points
1	1	Katsiaryna Netsviateyeva	Belarus	2:11.01	PB	950
2	1	Karolina Tymińska	Poland	2:11.84		938
3	1	Valérie Reggel	Switzerland	2:12.68	SB	926
4	1	Ellen Sprunger	Switzerland	2:12.93	PB	922
5	1	Yana Maksimava	Belarus	2:12.98		921
6	1	Ida Marcussen	Norway	2:13.45		915
7	1	Xénia Krizsán	Hungary	2:14.07		906
8	2	Györgyi Zsivoczky-Farkas	Hungary	2:14.68	SB	897
9	2	Antoinette Nana Djimou	France	2:15.22	PB	890
10	2	Claudia Rath	Germany	2:16.43		873
11	2	Laura Ikauniece-Admidina	Latvia	2:16.90		866
12	2	Carolin Schäfer	Germany	2:17.39	PB	859
13	2	Nadine Broersen	Netherlands	2:17.66		856
14	2	Lilli Schwarzkopf	Germany	2:17.67		855
15	1	Lucia Mokrášová	Slovakia	2:19.27	PB	833
16	2	Nafissatou Thiam	Belgium	2:20.79	PB	813
17	2	Anouk Vetter	Netherlands	2:22.27	PB	793
18	1	Grit Šadeiko	Estonia	2:23.16		781
19	1	Mari Klaup	Estonia	2:25.30		753
20	2	Anastasiya Mokhnyuk	Ukraine	2:26.32		740

=== Final standings ===
The highest mark recorded in each event is highlighted in yellow

Rank	Athlete	Nationality	100m H	HJ	SP	200m	LJ	JT	800m	Points	Notes
1st place, gold medalist(s)	Antoinette Nana Djimou	France	13.05	1.76	14.35	24.52	6.25	54.18	2:15.22	6551	SB
2nd place, silver medalist(s)	Nadine Broersen	Netherlands	13.48	1.94	13.35	25.08	6.16	52.18	2:17.66	6498	
3rd place, bronze medalist(s)	Nafissatou Thiam	Belgium	14.05	1.97	14.29	25.19	6.18	49.69	2:20.79	6423	
4	Carolin Schäfer	Germany	13.20	1.82	13.37	23.84	6.30	44.19	2:17.39	6395	PB
5	Lilli Schwarzkopf	Germany	13.87	1.85	14.44	25.86	6.18	52.17	2:17.67	6332	
6	Laura Ikauniece-Admidina	Latvia	13.61	1.82	12.58	24.75	6.20	51.30	2:16.90	6310	
7	Anouk Vetter	Netherlands	13.68	1.79	14.16	24.61	6.04	52.49	2:22.27	6281	
8	Claudia Rath	Germany	13.54	1.79	12.88	24.43	6.32	43.45	2:16.43	6225	
9	Xénia Krizsán	Hungary	13.59	1.79	14.17	25.37	6.01	43.58	2:14.07	6156	
10	Györgyi Zsivoczky-Farkas	Hungary	14.06	1.82	13.60	25.87	5.94	50.73	2:14.68	6151	SB
11	Karolina Tymińska	Poland	13.56	1.70	14.47	24.61	6.07	40.60	2:11.84	6132	
12	Valérie Reggel	Switzerland	13.79	1.70	13.70	25.05	6.14	44.46	2:12.68	6091	PB
13	Ellen Sprunger	Switzerland	13.65	1.73	13.42	24.17	5.95	41.06	2:12.93	6082	SB
14	Anastasiya Mokhnyuk	Ukraine	13.08	1.82	13.69	24.83	6.24	34.97	2:26.32	6025	
15	Grit Šadeiko	Estonia	13.28	1.76	12.31	24.56	6.07	43.84	2:23.16	6014	
16	Yana Maksimava	Belarus	14.29	1.88	13.86	26.47	5.58	45.80	2:12.98	5983	
17	Katsiaryna Netsviateyeva	Belarus	13.67	1.76	14.42	25.23	5.51	40.38	2:11.01	5970	
18	Ida Marcussen	Norway	14.26	1.73	12.77	25.73	6.05	47.85	2:13.45	5965	
19	Mari Klaup	Estonia	14.17	1.76	13.16	25.83	5.73	47.52	2:25.30	5765	SB
20	Lucia Mokrášová	Slovakia	14.01	1.70	12.69	24.31	5.75	38.53	2:19.27	5736	
	Linda Züblin	Switzerland	13.60	1.67	13.17	26.02	5.97	45.28	DNS	DNF	
	Jessica Samuelsson	Sweden	14.10	1.76	14.50	24.74	NM	41.01	DNS	DNF	
	Alina Fyodorova	Ukraine	14.01	1.76	12.76	DNS	–	–	DNS	DNF	
	Eliška Klučinová	Czech Republic	14.40	DNS	–	–	–	–	DNS	DNF	
