= Ukraine at the 2015 World Championships in Athletics =

- WA code: UKR
- National federation: Ukrainian Athletic Federation
- Website: www.uaf.org.ua

in (China) Beijing 22 August 2015 – 30 August 2015
- Competitors: 57 (20 men and 37 women)
- Medals Ranked 22nd: Gold 0 Silver 1 Bronze 1 Total 2

World Championships in Athletics appearances
- 1993; 1995; 1997; 1999; 2001; 2003; 2005; 2007; 2009; 2011; 2013; 2015; 2017; 2019; 2022; 2023; 2025

Ukraine competed at the 2015 World Championships in Athletics in Beijing, China, from 22 to 30 August 2015, in a team of 57 athletes.

== Medalists ==
The following competitors from Ukraine won medals at the Championships:

Medal	Athlete	Event	Date
2nd place, silver medalist(s)	Bohdan Bondarenko	Men's high jump	30 August
3rd place, bronze medalist(s)	Lyudmyla Olyanovska	Women's 20 kilometres walk	28 August

== Results ==
=== Men ===
==== Track and road events ====
Athlete	Event	Heats		Semifinals		Final	
Athlete	Event	Result	Rank	Result	Rank	Result	Rank
Serhiy Smelyk	200 metres	20.60	37	did not advance			
Vitaliy Butrym	400 metres	45.88	39	did not advance			
Ivan Babaryka	Marathon					DNF	
Oleksandr Babaryka	Marathon					DNF	
Serhiy Smelyk; Vitaliy Korzh; Volodymyr Suprun; Roman Kravtsov	4 × 100 metres relay	38.79 SB	11			did not advance	
Ruslan Dmytrenko	20 kilometres walk					1:23.37	21
Ivan Losev	20 kilometres walk					1:26.32	39
Ihor Hlavan	20 kilometres walk					1:20.29 SB	4
Ihor Hlavan	50 kilometres walk					DQ	
Ivan Banzeruk	50 kilometres walk					3:52:15	15
Serhiy Budza	50 kilometres walk					3:55:10	19

==== Field events ====
Athlete	Event	Qualification		Final	
Athlete	Event	Result	Rank	Result	Rank
Bohdan Bondarenko	High jump	2.31	3	2.33	2nd place, silver medalist(s)
Yuriy Krymarenko	High jump	2.22	28	did not advance	
Andriy Protsenko	High jump	2.29	17	did not advance	
Dmytro Yakovenko	High jump	2.26	27	did not advance	
Vladyslav Revenko	Pole vault	5.25	33	did not advance	
Yevhen Vynohradov	Hammer throw	74.09	14	did not advance	

==== Decathlon ====
Athlete	Event →	100 m	LJ	SP	HJ	400 m	110H	DT	PV	JT	1500 m	Final	Rank
Oleksiy Kasyanov	Result	10.73 SB	7.58	14.25	2.01 SB	48.13 SB	13.96 SB	45.84	4.80 SB	49.35 SB	4:31.80	8262 SB	9
Oleksiy Kasyanov	Points	922	955	744	813	903	980	784	849	579	733	8262 SB	9

=== Women ===
==== Track and road events ====
Athlete	Event	Heats		Semifinals		Final	
Athlete	Event	Result	Rank	Result	Rank	Result	Rank
Olesya Povh	100 metres	11.40	29	did not advance			
Nataliya Pohrebnyak	100 metres	11.62	42	did not advance			
Nataliya Pohrebnyak	200 metres	DNS					
Nataliya Strohova	200 metres	23.25	30	did not advance			
Hrystyna Stuy	200 metres	23.21	27	did not advance			
Nataliya Pyhyda	400 metres	51.07 SB	12	50.62 PB	8	did not advance	
Olha Zemlyak	400 metres	52.00	27	did not advance			
Nataliia Lupu	800 metres	1:59.62 SB	4	1:58.57 SB	7	1:58.99	6
Olha Lyakhova	800 metres	1:59.92 PB	6	1:58.94 PB	11	did not advance	
Anastasiya Tkachuk	800 metres	2:01.07	21	did not advance			
Olena Popova	Marathon					DNS	
Kateryna Karmanenko	Marathon					2:43:12 SB	31
Hanna Platitsyna	100 metres hurdles	13.15	26	did not advance			
Viktoriya Tkachuk	400 metres hurdles	57.38	29	did not advance			
Anna Yaroshchuk-Ryzhykova	400 metres hurdles	55.58 SB	11	55.16 SB	9	did not advance	
Mariya Shatalova	3000 metres steeplechase	9:36.87 PB	20			did not advance	
Olesya Povh; Nataliya Strohova; Hrystyna Stuy; Nataliya Pyhyda	4 × 100 metres relay	43.59	15			did not advance	
Nataliia Lupu; Nataliia Pygyda; Olha Lyakhova; Olha Zemlyak; Olha Bibik (heat); Yuliya Olishevska (heat)	4 × 400 metres relay	3:26.01 SB	6			3:25.94 SB	5
Nadiya Borovska	20 kilometres walk					1:31:18	11
Lyudmyla Olyanovska	20 kilometres walk					1:28:13	3rd place, bronze medalist(s)
Olena Shumkina	20 kilometres walk					DQ	

==== Field events ====
Athlete	Event	Qualification		Final	
Athlete	Event	Result	Rank	Result	Rank
Krystyna Hryshutyna	Long jump	6.53	18	did not advance	
Tetyana Ptashkina	Triple jump	13.05	27	did not advance	
Olga Saladukha	Triple jump	14.34	3	14.41	6
Iryna Herashchenko	High jump	1.85	23	did not advance	
Yuliya Levchenko	High jump	1.85	24	did not advance	
Oksana Okuneva	High jump	1.89	14	did not advance	
Halyna Obleshchuk	Shot put	16.97	19	did not advance	
Natalia Semenova	Discus throw	60.72	12	59.54	12
Iryna Novozhylova	Hammer throw	65.65	27	did not advance	
Kateryna Derun	Javelin throw	53.49	32	did not advance	
Hanna Hatsko-Fedusova	Javelin throw	61.41 SB	15	did not advance	

==== Heptathlon ====
Athlete	Event →	100H	HJ	SP	200 m	LJ	JT	800 m	Final	Rank
Alina Fyodorova	Result	14.17	1.86	14.98	25.22	6.06	35.67	2:22.43	5978	17
Alina Fyodorova	Points	954	1054	860	867	868	584	791	5978	17
Hanna Kasyanova	Result	DNS								
Hanna Kasyanova	Points	DNS								
Anastasiya Mokhnyuk	Result	13.07	1.83 PB	13.83	24.60	6.51	38.93 PB	2:17.00	6359 PB	7
Anastasiya Mokhnyuk	Points	1114	1014	783	924	1010	647	865	6359 PB	7
