= 2006 World Junior Championships in Athletics – Women's heptathlon =

The women's heptathlon event at the 2006 World Junior Championships in Athletics was held in Beijing, China, at Chaoyang Sports Centre on 18 and 19 August.

== Medalists ==
Gold	Tatyana Chernova; Russia
Silver	Ida Marcussen; Norway
Bronze	Yana Panteleyeva; Russia

== Results ==
=== Final ===
18/19 August

The highest mark recorded in each event is highlighted in yellow

Rank	Name	Nationality	100m H	HJ	SP	200m	LJ	JT	800m	Points	Notes
1st place, gold medalist(s)	Tatyana Chernova	Russia	13.70 (w: 1.6 m/s)	1.80	12.18	24.05 (w: 0.3 m/s)	6.35	50.51	2:25.49	6227	
2nd place, silver medalist(s)	Ida Marcussen	Norway	14.10 (w: 0.1 m/s)	1.68	13.68	24.72 (w: 0.2 m/s)	6.04	45.42	2:14.07	6020	
3rd place, bronze medalist(s)	Yana Panteleyeva	Russia	14.52 (w: -0.8 m/s)	1.80	13.35	25.03 (w: -0.1 m/s)	6.18	40.44	2:15.96	5979	
4	Irina Ilkevych	Ukraine	14.00 (w: -0.8 m/s)	1.74	11.08	24.24 (w: 0.3 m/s)	6.24	40.03	2:13.00	5952	
5	Diana Rach	Germany	14.18 (w: -0.8 m/s)	1.71	12.73	24.72 (w: -0.1 m/s)	5.90	44.73	2:26.20	5760	
6	Jade Surman	United Kingdom	14.08 (w: -0.8 m/s)	1.71	11.50	25.39 (w: 0.2 m/s)	6.00	36.17	2:23.15	5538	
7	Song Lijuan	China	14.10 (w: 1.6 m/s)	1.77	11.10	25.23 (w: -0.1 m/s)	5.83	35.75	2:26.36	5496	
8	Eliška Klučinová	Czech Republic	14.77 (w: 0.1 m/s)	1.77	12.17	25.73 (w: 0.2 m/s)	5.44	43.27	2:25.61	5468	
9	Aiga Grabuste	Latvia	14.57 (w: 0.1 m/s)	1.68	12.82	25.70 (w: 0.3 m/s)	5.80	40.67	2:28.92	5443	
10	Romy Gürbig	Germany	14.15 (w: 1.6 m/s)	1.68	10.35	25.73 (w: 0.2 m/s)	5.83	43.17	2:27.16	5415	
11	Yasmina Omrani	France	15.01 (w: 0.1 m/s)	1.68	11.68	25.42 (w: 0.3 m/s)	5.89	35.69	2:20.59	5376	
12	Shana Woods	United States	14.14 (w: 1.6 m/s)	1.68	8.93	24.33 (w: 0.2 m/s)	5.90	34.51	2:26.95	5311	
13	Ellinore Hallin	Sweden	14.45 (w: 1.6 m/s)	1.71	12.64	25.55 (w: 0.2 m/s)	5.45	34.66	2:27.56	5299	
14	Valérie Reggel	Switzerland	14.97 (w: -0.8 m/s)	1.53	10.78	25.26 (w: -0.1 m/s)	5.83	39.34	2:18.38	5244	
15	Kateřina Cachová	Czech Republic	14.36 (w: 1.6 m/s)	1.71	9.82	25.66 (w: -0.1 m/s)	5.41	34.05	2:21.60	5170	
16	Megan Wheatley	Australia	14.46 (w: -0.8 m/s)	1.56	12.04	25.29 (w: -0.1 m/s)	5.50	32.37	2:21.61	5151	
17	Brianne Theisen	Canada	14.67 (w: -0.8 m/s)	1.65	9.87	25.63 (w: 0.3 m/s)	5.66	36.52	2:24.08	5149	
18	Dominique Blaize	United Kingdom	14.11 (w: 0.1 m/s)	1.71	12.23	25.01 (w: 0.3 m/s)	5.76	29.46	2:53.34	5064	
19	Wei Xiaobin	China	14.48 (w: 0.1 m/s)	1.65	10.88	26.26 (w: 0.3 m/s)	NM	33.04	2:42.79	4144	
	Olimpia Nowak	Poland	14.84 (w: 0.1 m/s)	1.56	11.60	25.90 (w: 0.2 m/s)	NM	DNS	DNS	DNF	
	Maiju Mattila	Finland	14.77 (w: 1.6 m/s)	1.71	9.22	26.70 (w: 0.2 m/s)	DNS	DNS	DNS	DNF	
	Éloyse Lesueur	France	13.89 (w: 1.6 m/s)	1.71	10.20	DNS	DNS	DNS	DNS	DNF	
	Shevell Quinley	United States	14.46 (w: 0.1 m/s)	1.56	DNS	DNS	DNS	DNS	DNS	DNF	

== Participation ==
According to an unofficial count, 23 athletes from 16 countries participated in the event.

- Australia (1)
- Canada (1)
- China (2)
- Czech Republic (2)
- Finland (1)
- France (2)
- Germany (2)
- Latvia (1)
- Norway (1)
- Poland (1)
- Russia (2)
- Sweden (1)
- Switzerland (1)
- Ukraine (1)
- United Kingdom (2)
- United States (2)
