= Switzerland at the 2015 World Championships in Athletics =

- WA code: SUI
- National federation: Swiss Athletics Federation
- Website: www.swiss-athletics.ch

in Beijing
- Competitors: 15
- Medals: Gold 0 Silver 0 Bronze 0 Total 0

World Championships in Athletics appearances
- 1976; 1980; 1983; 1987; 1991; 1993; 1995; 1997; 1999; 2001; 2003; 2005; 2007; 2009; 2011; 2013; 2015; 2017; 2019; 2022; 2023; 2025

Switzerland competed at the 2015 World Championships in Athletics in Beijing, China, from 22 to 30 August 2015.

== Results ==
(q – qualified, NM – no mark, SB – season best)

=== Men ===
Track and road events

Athlete	Event	Heat		Semifinal		Final	
Athlete	Event	Result	Rank	Result	Rank	Result	Rank
Kariem Hussein	400 metres hurdles	49.08	3 Q	48.59	3	Did not advance	
Tadesse Abraham	Marathon	—N/a				2:19:25	19

=== Women ===
Track and road events

Athlete	Event	Heat		Semifinal		Final	
Athlete	Event	Result	Rank	Result	Rank	Result	Rank
Mujinga Kambundji	100 metres	11.17 NR	2 Q	11.07 NR	5	Did not advance	
Mujinga Kambundji	200 metres	22.92	2 Q	22.64 NR	4	Did not advance	
Selina Büchel	800 metres	2:00.25	2 Q	1:58.63	3	Did not advance	
Noemi Zbären	100 metres hurdles	12.93	3 Q	12.81	3 q	12.95	6
Petra Fontanive	400 metres hurdles	56.40	3 Q	56.35	6	Did not advance	
Léa Sprunger	400 metres hurdles	55.71	4 Q	55.83	6	Did not advance	
Sarah Atcho; Marisa Lavanchy; Mujinga Kambundji; Léa Sprunger	4 × 100 metres relay	43.38	6	—N/a		Did not advance	
Laura Polli	20 kilometres walk	—N/a				1:36:26 SB	33
Marie Polli	20 kilometres walk	—N/a				1:39:49	40

Field events

Athlete	Event	Qualification		Final	
Athlete	Event	Distance	Position	Distance	Position
Nicole Büchler	Pole vault	4.45	17	Did not advance	
Angelica Moser	Pole vault	4.15	25	Did not advance	

Combined events – Heptathlon

Athlete	Event	100H	HJ	SP	200 m	LJ	JT	800 m	Final	Rank
Caroline Agnou	Result	13.93	1.68	14.49 PB	25.14 PB	5.97	43.15	2:23.33 SB	5866	22
Caroline Agnou	Points	988	830	827	874	840	728	779	5866	22
Valérie Reggel	Result	13.94	1.62	13.32	24.83	NM	42.57	DNS	DNF	
Valérie Reggel	Points	987	759	749	902	0	717	DNS	DNF	

== Sources ==
- Swiss team
