= 2015 World Championships in Athletics – Women's heptathlon =

Women's heptathlon at the 2015 World Championships
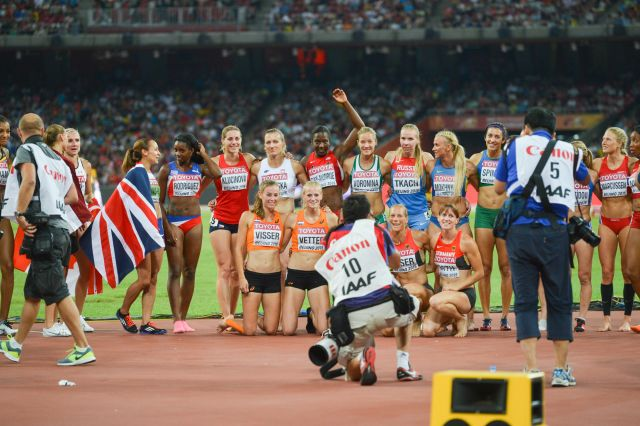
- Venue: Beijing National Stadium
- Dates: 22 (day 1); 23 August (day 2)
- Competitors: 34 from 24 nations
- Winning points: 6669

Medalists
gold medal	Jessica Ennis-Hill	Great Britain
silver medal	Brianne Theisen-Eaton	Canada
bronze medal	Laura Ikauniece-Admidiņa	Latvia

The women's heptathlon at the 2015 World Championships in Athletics was held at the Beijing National Stadium on 22 and 23 August.

== Summary ==
Hanna Kasyanova (née Melnychenko) of Ukraine entered the competition as defending champion, although the favourite for the competition was the silver medalist of 2013 World Championships Brianne Theisen-Eaton who is the world leader by a margin of more than 250 points. Other potential winners and medalists were 2009 World and 2012 Olympic champion Jessica Ennis-Hill, returning from giving birth to her first child, 2015 European pentathlon champion and 2014 world number one Katarina Johnson-Thompson, Nadine Broersen, Carolin Schäfer, Barbara Nwaba, Nadine Visser and Nafissatou Thiam.

The returning champion Kasyanova did not start. The American champion Nwaba fell out of contention from the gun of the first race, misstepping the first hurdle and falling at the next. Meanwhile, Olympic champion Ennis-Hill made it clear she was intending to take this championship. Visser started strongly with two personal bests, her 12.81 hurdles just missing the national record that is almost six years older than she is. Johnson-Thompson joined her hyphenated British teammate in the medal hunt with a 1.89 high jump and a 200 metres win and personal bests in the other two events. Lurking in fourth place after the first day was returning silver medalist and world leader Theisen-Eaton who had been struggling through her last couple of events.

As the second day began, Theisen-Eaton excelled in the long jump while Johnson-Thompson was unable to land a legal jump, taking her out of the hunt and reshuffling the top athletes. Also joining the medal hunt was the top long jumper of the day, Claudia Rath. Anastasiya Mokhnyuk moved into the third-place position while Ennis-Hill's lead was over a hundred points. The javelin throw is not a strong event for any of the jumpers allowing strong throwers Laura Ikauniece-Admidiņa and the other Dutch Nadine Broersen to move up into the top four. Theisen-Eaton injured her groin during the javelin but made it to the start line of the final event intending to run for a medal. Theisen-Eaton ran hard at the front of the final group, chased only by Ennis-Hill, the pair clearly out-distancing the rest of the leader group. But Ennis-Hill was not just satisfied by winning on points, she stamped an exclamation point on the win by marking Theisen-Eaton to the final straight then sprinting past. Ikauniece-Admidiņa held on to third place with her Latvian National Record while Boersen and Mokhnyuk suffered several seconds further back.

The result was that Ennis-Hill won gold by 115 points. This was her narrowest winning margin in a World Athletics Championships heptathlon. She didn't win any individual events but she placed second in the 100 metres hurdles, high jump, 200 metres and 800 metres as well as placing fourth in the long jump.

== Records ==
Prior to the competition, the records were as follows:

World record	Jackie Joyner-Kersee (USA)	7291	Seoul, South Korea	24 September 1988
Championship record	Jackie Joyner-Kersee (USA)	7128	Rome, Italy	1 September 1987
World leading	Brianne Theisen-Eaton (CAN)	6808	Götzis, Austria	31 May 2015
African record	Margaret Simpson (GHA)	6423	Götzis, Austria	29 May 2005
Asian record	Ghada Shouaa (SYR)	6942	Götzis, Austria	26 May 1996
North, Central American and Caribbean record	Jackie Joyner-Kersee (USA)	7291	Seoul, South Korea	24 September 1988
South American record	Lucimara da Silva (BRA)	6160	Barquisimeto, Venezuela	10 June 2012
European record	Carolina Klüft (SWE)	7032	Osaka, Japan	26 August 2007
Oceanian record	Jane Flemming (AUS)	6695	Auckland, New Zealand	28 January 1990

== Qualification standards ==
Points
6075 pts

== Schedule ==
Date	Time	Round
22 August 2015	09:00	100 metres hurdles
22 August 2015	10:20	High jump
22 August 2015	18:30	Shot put
22 August 2015	20:15	200 metres
23 August 2015	09:00	Long jump
23 August 2015	10:50	Javelin throw
23 August 2015	19:40	800 metres

All times are local times (UTC+8)

== Results ==
KEY:	NR	National record	PB	Personal best	SB	Seasonal best

=== 100 metres hurdles ===
The 100 metres hurdles was held on 22 August at 09:00.

Rank	Heat	Athlete	Nationality	Result	Points	Notes
1	4	Nadine Visser	Netherlands	12.81	1153	PB
2	4	Jessica Ennis-Hill	Great Britain & N.I.	12.91	1138	
3	4	Brianne Theisen-Eaton	Canada	12.98	1127	PB
4	4	Anastasiya Mokhnyuk	Ukraine	13.07	1114	
5	4	Akela Jones	Barbados	13.17	1099	
6	3	Laura Ikauniece-Admidiņa	Latvia	13.21	1093	PB
7	4	Erica Bougard	United States	13.28	1083	
8	3	Grit Šadeiko	Estonia	13.36	1071	
9	3	Katarina Johnson-Thompson	Great Britain & N.I.	13.37	1069	PB
10	3	Carolin Schäfer	Germany	13.40	1065	SB
11	4	Sharon Day-Monroe	United States	13.42	1062	
12	3	Claudia Rath	Germany	13.44	1059	PB
13	2	Karolina Tymińska	Poland	13.52	1047	SB
14	3	Nadine Broersen	Netherlands	13.55	1043	
15	2	Portia Bing	New Zealand	13.59	1037	PB
16	3	Anouk Vetter	Netherlands	13.61	1034	
17	2	Jennifer Oeser	Germany	13.67	1026	SB
18	2	Xénia Krizsán	Hungary	13.70	1021	
19	1	Yorgelis Rodríguez	Cuba	13.73	1017	SB
20	3	Uhunoma Osazuwa	Nigeria	13.75	1014	
21	1	Sofia Yfantidou	Greece	13.77	1011	SB
22	2	Nafissatou Thiam	Belgium	13.83	1003	
23	1	Györgyi Zsivoczky-Farkas	Hungary	13.85	1000	PB
24	2	Caroline Agnou	Switzerland	13.93	988	
25	2	Valérie Reggel	Switzerland	13.94	987	
26	2	Salcia Slack	Jamaica	13.98	981	
27	1	Eliška Klučinová	Czech Republic	14.06	970	
28	2	Alina Fyodorova	Ukraine	14.17	954	
29	1	Vanessa Spínola	Brazil	14.28	939	
30	1	Ida Marcussen	Norway	14.47	913	
31	1	Lyubov Tkach	Russia	15.05	835	
32	1	Ekaterina Voronina	Uzbekistan	15.09	830	PB
	3	Barbara Nwaba	United States	DNF	0	
	4	Marthe Koala	Burkina Faso	DNF	0	
	4	Hanna Kasyanova	Ukraine	DNS	0	
	1	Evelis Aguilar	Colombia	DNS	0	

=== High jump ===
The high jump was started on 22 August at 10:20.

Rank	Group	Athlete	Nationality	Result	Points	Notes	Overall	Overall Rank
1	A	Katarina Johnson-Thompson	Great Britain & N.I.	1.89	1093		2166	2
2	A	Jessica Ennis-Hill	Great Britain & N.I.	1.86	1054	SB	2192	1
3	A	Eliška Klučinová	Czech Republic	1.86	1054		2024	17
3	A	Györgyi Zsivoczky-Farkas	Hungary	1.86	1054	PB	2054	11
5	A	Alina Fyodorova	Ukraine	1.86	1054		2008	20
5	A	Nadine Broersen	Netherlands	1.86	1054	SB	2097	6
7	A	Yorgelis Rodríguez	Cuba	1.86	1054	PB	2071	9
8	A	Nafissatou Thiam	Belgium	1.86	1054		2057	10
9	A	Uhunoma Osazuwa	Nigeria	1.83	1016		2030	16
9	A	Jennifer Oeser	Germany	1.83	1016		2040	13
11	B	Anastasiya Mokhnyuk	Ukraine	1.83	1016	PB	2130	4
12	A	Erica Bougard	United States	1.83	1016		2097	6
13	A	Carolin Schäfer	Germany	1.80	978		2043	12
13	A	Akela Jones	Barbados	1.80	978		2077	8
15	A	Brianne Theisen-Eaton	Canada	1.80	978		2105	5
15	B	Claudia Rath	Germany	1.80	978	SB	2037	14
17	B	Xénia Krizsán	Hungary	1.80	978	SB	1999	22
18	B	Nadine Visser	Netherlands	1.80	978	PB	2131	3
19	B	Ekaterina Voronina	Uzbekistan	1.80	978	SB	1808	27
20	B	Portia Bing	New Zealand	1.80	978	=PB	2015	18
21	A	Barbara Nwaba	United States	1.77	941		941	33
22	A	Sharon Day-Monroe	United States	1.77	941		2003	21
23	A	Laura Ikauniece-Admidiņa	Latvia	1.77	941		2034	15
24	B	Anouk Vetter	Netherlands	1.77	941	SB	1975	23
24	B	Grit Šadeiko	Estonia	1.77	941		2012	19
26	A	Lyubov Tkach	Russia	1.74	903		1738	32
27	B	Vanessa Spínola	Brazil	1.68	830		1769	28
28	B	Sofia Yfantidou	Greece	1.68	830	SB	1841	25
28	B	Caroline Agnou	Switzerland	1.68	830		1818	26
30	B	Ida Marcussen	Norway	1.68	830		1743	30
31	B	Karolina Tymińska	Poland	1.65	795		1842	24
32	B	Valérie Reggel	Switzerland	1.62	759		1746	29
33	B	Salcia Slack	Jamaica	1.62	759	SB	1740	31
	B	Evelis Aguilar	Colombia	DNS	0		0	
	B	Hanna Kasyanova	Ukraine	DNS	0		0	
	B	Marthe Koala	Burkina Faso	DNS	0		0	

=== Shot put ===
The shot put was held on 22 August at 18:30.

Rank	Group	Athlete	Nationality	Result	Points	Notes	Overall	Overall Rank
1	A	Nafissatou Thiam	Belgium	15.24	877	PB	2934	2
2	A	Alina Fyodorova	Ukraine	14.98	860		2868	7
3	A	Sharon Day-Monroe	United States	14.85	851		2854	10
4	A	Barbara Nwaba	United States	14.64	837	PB	1778	33
5	A	Nadine Broersen	Netherlands	14.59	833		2930	3
6	B	Caroline Agnou	Switzerland	14.49	827	PB	2645	24
7	A	Anouk Vetter	Netherlands	14.24	810		2785	17
8	A	Györgyi Zsivoczky-Farkas	Hungary	14.13	803		2857	9
9	A	Xénia Krizsán	Hungary	14.12	802		2801	14
10	A	Lyubov Tkach	Russia	13.99	793		2531	28
11	A	Anastasiya Mokhnyuk	Ukraine	13.83	783		2913	4
12	A	Jennifer Oeser	Germany	13.81	781		2821	12
13	A	Karolina Tymińska	Poland	13.79	780		2622	25
14	A	Eliška Klučinová	Czech Republic	13.79	780		2804	13
15	B	Jessica Ennis-Hill	Great Britain & N.I.	13.73	776		2968	1
16	B	Brianne Theisen-Eaton	Canada	13.70	774		2879	5
17	B	Portia Bing	New Zealand	13.60	767	PB	2782	18
18	A	Yorgelis Rodríguez	Cuba	13.54	763		2834	11
19	A	Salcia Slack	Jamaica	13.53	763		2503	30
20	B	Ekaterina Voronina	Uzbekistan	13.52	762	SB	2570	26
21	A	Vanessa Spínola	Brazil	13.44	757		2526	29
22	B	Valérie Reggel	Switzerland	13.32	749		2495	31
23	B	Carolin Schäfer	Germany	13.31	748		2791	15
24	B	Nadine Visser	Netherlands	13.16	738		2869	6
25	B	Claudia Rath	Germany	13.09	733		2770	19
26	B	Sofia Yfantidou	Greece	12.94	723		2564	27
27	B	Ida Marcussen	Norway	12.86	718		2461	32
28	A	Akela Jones	Barbados	12.73	709		2786	16
29	B	Laura Ikauniece-Admidiņa	Latvia	12.71	708		2742	20
30	B	Katarina Johnson-Thompson	Great Britain & N.I.	12.47	692	PB	2858	8
31	B	Grit Šadeiko	Estonia	12.05	664		2678	22
32	B	Uhunoma Osazuwa	Nigeria	11.79	647		2677	23
33	B	Erica Bougard	United States	11.40	621		2718	21

=== 200 metres ===
The 200 metres were held on 22 August at 20:15.

Wind:
Heat 1: +0.4, Heat 2: −1.3, Heat 3: +0.8, Heat 4: +0.2 m/s.

Rank	Heat	Athlete	Nationality	Result	Points	Notes	Overall	Overall Rank
1	4	Katarina Johnson-Thompson	Great Britain & N.I.	23.08	1071	SB	3925	2
2	4	Jessica Ennis-Hill	Great Britain & N.I.	23.42	1037	SB	4005	1
3	4	Nadine Visser	Netherlands	23.78	1002		3871	3
4	4	Brianne Theisen-Eaton	Canada	23.94	986		3865	4
5	3	Laura Ikauniece-Admidiņa	Latvia	23.97	984		3726	13
6	3	Portia Bing	New Zealand	24.00	981		3763	8
7	3	Karolina Tymińska	Poland	24.15	966		3588	24
8	3	Claudia Rath	Germany	24.15	966		3736	11
9	4	Carolin Schäfer	Germany	24.22	960		3751	9
10	3	Uhunoma Osazuwa	Nigeria	24.36	946		3623	22
11	2	Grit Šadeiko	Estonia	24.41	942		3618	23
11	4	Erica Bougard	United States	24.41	942		3662	20
13	4	Barbara Nwaba	United States	24.47	936		2714	33
14	4	Anouk Vetter	Netherlands	24.53	930		3715	15
15	2	Anastasiya Mokhnyuk	Ukraine	24.60	924		3837	5
16	3	Lyubov Tkach	Russia	24.64	920		3451	26
17	4	Akela Jones	Barbados	24.70	915		3701	18
18	3	Vanessa Spínola	Brazil	24.73	912		3438	27
19	3	Salcia Slack	Jamaica	24.73	912		3415	28
20	2	Valérie Reggel	Switzerland	24.83	902		3397	29
21	1	Jennifer Oeser	Germany	25.03	884		3707	16
22	2	Yorgelis Rodríguez	Cuba	25.04	883		3717	14
23	2	Sharon Day-Monroe	United States	25.05	882		3736	10
24	1	Caroline Agnou	Switzerland	25.14	874	PB	3519	25
25	2	Alina Fyodorova	Ukraine	25.22	867		3735	12
26	2	Xénia Krizsán	Hungary	25.27	862		3663	19
27	1	Nafissatou Thiam	Belgium	25.28	861		3795	6
28	2	Eliška Klučinová	Czech Republic	25.39	851		3655	21
29	2	Nadine Broersen	Netherlands	25.41	850		3780	7
30	1	Györgyi Zsivoczky-Farkas	Hungary	25.43	848	PB	3705	17
31	1	Ekaterina Voronina	Uzbekistan	25.77	817		3387	30
32	1	Sofia Yfantidou	Greece	25.93	803		3367	31
33	1	Ida Marcussen	Norway	26.27	774		3235	32

=== Long jump ===
The long jump was started on 23 August at 09:00.

Rank	Group	Athlete	Nationality	Result	Points	Notes	Overall	Overall Rank
1	A	Claudia Rath	Germany	6.61	1043		4779	4
2	A	Brianne Theisen-Eaton	Canada	6.55	1023		4888	2
3	A	Anastasiya Mokhnyuk	Ukraine	6.51	1010		4847	3
4	A	Jessica Ennis-Hill	Great Britain & N.I.	6.43	985	SB	4990	1
5	A	Laura Ikauniece-Admidiņa	Latvia	6.32	949	PB	4675	8
6	B	Györgyi Zsivoczky-Farkas	Hungary	6.29	940	SB	4645	9
7	A	Grit Šadeiko	Estonia	6.22	918		4536	18
8	B	Uhunoma Osazuwa	Nigeria	6.21	915	SB	4538	17
9	B	Nadine Broersen	Netherlands	6.20	912		4692	6
10	A	Erica Bougard	United States	6.18	905		4567	15
11	A	Jennifer Oeser	Germany	6.17	902		4609	10
12	B	Xénia Krizsán	Hungary	6.16	899	SB	4562	16
13	A	Nadine Visser	Netherlands	6.14	893		4764	5
14	A	Nafissatou Thiam	Belgium	6.14	893		4688	7
15	A	Anouk Vetter	Netherlands	6.11	883		4598	12
16	A	Eliška Klučinová	Czech Republic	6.10	880		4535	19
17	A	Akela Jones	Barbados	6.09	877		4578	14
18	A	Karolina Tymińska	Poland	6.08	874		4462	22
18	B	Barbara Nwaba	United States	6.08	874		3588	32
20	A	Alina Fyodorova	Ukraine	6.06	868		4603	11
21	B	Lyubov Tkach	Russia	6.01	853		4304	24
22	A	Caroline Agnou	Switzerland	5.97	840		4359	23
23	B	Portia Bing	New Zealand	5.95	834		4597	13
24	B	Ida Marcussen	Norway	5.89	816		4051	29
25	B	Yorgelis Rodríguez	Cuba	5.83	798		4515	21
26	B	Ekaterina Voronina	Uzbekistan	5.81	792		4179	25
27	B	Sharon Day-Monroe	United States	5.79	786		4522	20
28	B	Sofia Yfantidou	Greece	5.75	774		4141	26
29	B	Salcia Slack	Jamaica	5.54	712		4127	27
30	B	Vanessa Spínola	Brazil	5.40	671		4109	28
	B	Valérie Reggel	Switzerland	NM	0		3397	33
	B	Carolin Schäfer	Germany	NM	0		3751	31
	A	Katarina Johnson-Thompson	Great Britain & N.I.	NM	0		3925	30

=== Javelin throw ===
The javelin throw was started on 23 August at 10:50.

Rank	Group	Athlete	Nationality	Result	Points	Notes	Overall	Overall Rank
1	A	Sofia Yfantidou	Greece	56.19	980		5121	21
2	A	Laura Ikauniece-Admidiņa	Latvia	53.67	931	SB	5606	4
3	A	Nadine Broersen	Netherlands	53.52	928		5620	2
4	A	Anouk Vetter	Netherlands	51.78	895		5493	7
5	A	Eliška Klučinová	Czech Republic	51.09	881	PB	5416	11
6	A	Nafissatou Thiam	Belgium	49.31	847		5535	5
7	A	Györgyi Zsivoczky-Farkas	Hungary	49.30	847	SB	5492	8
8	A	Xénia Krizsán	Hungary	49.17	844		5406	12
9	A	Grit Šadeiko	Estonia	47.78	817		5353	14
10	B	Barbara Nwaba	United States	46.59	794	PB	4382	31
11	A	Jennifer Oeser	Germany	46.45	791	SB	5400	13
12	A	Sharon Day-Monroe	United States	46.02	783		5305	15
13	A	Carolin Schäfer	Germany	45.21	768		4519	30
14	B	Ekaterina Voronina	Uzbekistan	44.44	753	SB	4932	25
15	B	Vanessa Spínola	Brazil	43.75	739		4848	26
16	A	Yorgelis Rodríguez	Cuba	43.27	730		5245	16
17	A	Caroline Agnou	Switzerland	43.15	728		5087	22
18	B	Brianne Theisen-Eaton	Canada	42.94	724		5612	3
19	A	Valérie Reggel	Switzerland	42.57	717		4114	32
20	B	Jessica Ennis-Hill	Great Britain & N.I.	42.51	716		5706	1
21	A	Ida Marcussen	Norway	42.01	706		4757	27
22	B	Claudia Rath	Germany	41.31	692		5471	9
23	B	Nadine Visser	Netherlands	40.07	669		5433	10
24	B	Katarina Johnson-Thompson	Great Britain & N.I.	39.52	658		4583	29
25	B	Anastasiya Mokhnyuk	Ukraine	38.93	647	PB	5494	6
26	A	Lyubov Tkach	Russia	38.34	635		4939	24
27	B	Uhunoma Osazuwa	Nigeria	36.88	608		5146	19
28	B	Salcia Slack	Jamaica	36.11	593		4720	28
29	B	Alina Fyodorova	Ukraine	35.67	584		5187	17
30	B	Erica Bougard	United States	35.06	573		5140	20
31	B	Portia Bing	New Zealand	34.69	566		5163	18
32	B	Karolina Tymińska	Poland	34.66	565		5027	23
	B	Akela Jones	Barbados	DNS	0		0	

=== 800 metres ===
The 800 metres were held on 23 August at 19:40.

Rank	Heat	Athlete	Nationality	Result	Points	Notes
1	3	Claudia Rath	Germany	2:09.66	970	
2	4	Jessica Ennis-Hill	Great Britain & N.I.	2:10.13	963	
3	4	Brianne Theisen-Eaton	Canada	2:11.52	942	
4	3	Sharon Day-Monroe	United States	2:11.61	941	
5	1	Barbara Nwaba	United States	2:12.20	933	
6	1	Ida Marcussen	Norway	2:12.62	927	
7	2	Karolina Tymińska	Poland	2:13.04	921	
8	3	Xénia Krizsán	Hungary	2:13.36	916	
9	3	Nadine Visser	Netherlands	2:13.72	911	PB
10	4	Laura Ikauniece-Admidiņa	Latvia	2:13.79	910	
11	3	Jennifer Oeser	Germany	2:13.89	908	SB
12	4	Györgyi Zsivoczky-Farkas	Hungary	2:14.71	897	
13	2	Portia Bing	New Zealand	2:14.88	894	
14	4	Nadine Broersen	Netherlands	2:16.58	871	
15	4	Anastasiya Mokhnyuk	Ukraine	2:17.00	865	
16	3	Grit Šadeiko	Estonia	2:17.32	860	
17	3	Eliška Klučinová	Czech Republic	2:19.48	831	
18	2	Sofia Yfantidou	Greece	2:19.55	830	
19	2	Uhunoma Osazuwa	Nigeria	2:21.36	805	PB
20	1	Vanessa Spínola	Brazil	2:21.81	799	
21	2	Alina Fyodorova	Ukraine	2:22.43	791	
22	2	Lyubov Tkach	Russia	2:22.50	790	
23	2	Caroline Agnou	Switzerland	2:23.33	779	SB
24	4	Anouk Vetter	Netherlands	2:23.71	774	
25	1	Ekaterina Voronina	Uzbekistan	2:24.04	769	SB
26	4	Nafissatou Thiam	Belgium	2:24.55	763	
27	3	Yorgelis Rodríguez	Cuba	2:30.47	687	
28	1	Katarina Johnson-Thompson	Great Britain & N.I.	2:50.73	456	
	1	Carolin Schäfer	Germany	DNS		
	2	Erica Bougard	United States	DNS		
	1	Salcia Slack	Jamaica	DNS		
	1	Valérie Reggel	Switzerland	DNS		

=== Final standings ===
After all events.

Rank	Athlete	Nationality	100 h	HJ	SP	200	LJ	JT	800	Total	Note
1st place, gold medalist(s)	Jessica Ennis-Hill	Great Britain & N.I.	1138	1054	776	1037	985	716	963	6669	SB
2nd place, silver medalist(s)	Brianne Theisen-Eaton	Canada	1127	978	774	986	1023	724	942	6554	
3rd place, bronze medalist(s)	Laura Ikauniece-Admidiņa	Latvia	1093	941	708	984	949	931	910	6516	NR
4	Nadine Broersen	Netherlands	1043	1054	833	850	912	928	871	6491	
5	Claudia Rath	Germany	1059	978	733	966	1043	692	970	6441	
6	Györgyi Zsivoczky-Farkas	Hungary	1000	1054	803	848	940	847	897	6389	PB
7	Anastasiya Mokhnyuk	Ukraine	1114	1016	783	924	1010	647	865	6359	PB
8	Nadine Visser	Netherlands	1153	978	738	1002	893	669	911	6344	
9	Xénia Krizsán	Hungary	1021	978	802	862	899	844	916	6322	PB
10	Jennifer Oeser	Germany	1026	1016	781	884	902	791	908	6308	SB
11	Nafissatou Thiam	Belgium	1003	1054	877	861	893	847	763	6298	
12	Anouk Vetter	Netherlands	1034	941	810	930	883	895	774	6267	
13	Eliška Klučinová	Czech Republic	970	1054	780	851	880	881	831	6247	
14	Sharon Day-Monroe	United States	1062	941	851	882	786	783	941	6246	
15	Grit Šadeiko	Estonia	1071	941	664	942	918	817	860	6213	SB
16	Portia Bing	New Zealand	1037	978	767	981	834	566	894	6057	
17	Alina Fyodorova	Ukraine	954	1054	860	867	868	584	791	5978	
18	Uhunoma Osazuwa	Nigeria	1014	1016	647	946	915	608	805	5951	
19	Sofia Yfantidou	Greece	1011	830	723	803	774	980	830	5951	
20	Karolina Tymińska	Poland	1047	795	780	966	874	565	921	5948	
21	Yorgelis Rodríguez	Cuba	1017	1054	763	883	798	730	687	5932	
22	Caroline Agnou	Switzerland	988	830	827	874	840	728	779	5866	
23	Lyubov Tkach	Russia	835	903	793	920	853	635	790	5729	
24	Ekaterina Voronina	Uzbekistan	830	978	762	817	792	753	769	5701	SB
25	Ida Marcussen	Norway	913	830	718	774	816	706	927	5684	
26	Vanessa Spínola	Brazil	939	830	757	912	671	739	799	5647	
27	Barbara Nwaba	United States	DNF	941	837	936	874	794	933	5315	
28	Katarina Johnson-Thompson	Great Britain & N.I.	1069	1093	692	1071	0	658	456	5039	SB
	Carolin Schäfer	Germany	1065	978	748	960	0	768	DNS	—N/a	DNF
	Erica Bougard	United States	1083	1016	621	942	905	573	DNS	—N/a	DNF
	Salcia Slack	Jamaica	981	759	763	912	712	593	DNS	—N/a	DNF
	Valérie Reggel	Switzerland	987	759	749	902	0	717	DNS	—N/a	DNF
	Akela Jones	Barbados	1099	978	709	915	877	DNS		—N/a	DNF
	Marthe Koala	Burkina Faso	DNF	DNS						—N/a	DNF
	Evelis Aguilar	Colombia	DNS							—N/a	DNS
	Hanna Kasyanova	Ukraine	DNS							—N/a	DNS
