= Netherlands at the 2015 World Championships in Athletics =

- WA code: NED

in Beijing
- Competitors: 21
- Medals Ranked 12th: Gold 1 Silver 1 Bronze 1 Total 3

World Championships in Athletics appearances
- 1976; 1980; 1983; 1987; 1991; 1993; 1995; 1997; 1999; 2001; 2003; 2005; 2007; 2009; 2011; 2013; 2015; 2017; 2019; 2022; 2023; 2025

Netherlands competed at the 2015 World Championships in Athletics in Beijing, China, from 22–30 August 2015.

At the third day Dafne Schippers won in a new Dutch national record her semi final heat of the 100 metres in a time of 10.83. With this achievement she became the first Dutch finalist in the women's 100 metres at a World Championships. In the final, later that day, she broke her national record again with a time of 10.81 and won the silver medal. Later, she won the gold medal in the 200 metres in a time of 21.63, a new European record.

== Medalists ==
Medal	Athlete	Event	Date
Gold	Dafne Schippers	200 metres	28 August
Silver	Dafne Schippers	100 metres	24 August
Bronze	Sifan Hassan	1500 metres	25 August

== Results ==
(q – qualified, NM – no mark, SB – season best)

=== Men ===
Track and road events

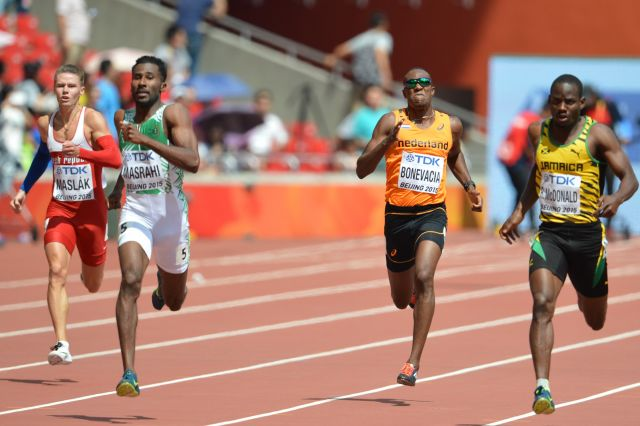
Liemarvin Bonevacia in the 400m

Athlete	Event	Heat		Semifinal		Final	
Athlete	Event	Result	Rank	Result	Rank	Result	Rank
Churandy Martina	100 metres	10.06 SB	15 Q	10.09	16	Did not advance	
Churandy Martina	200 metres	20.22 SB	8 Q	20.20 SB	10	Did not advance	
Liemarvin Bonevacia	400 metres	44.72 NR	16 q	45.65	24	Did not advance	
Thijmen Kupers	800 metres	1:46.70	13 q	1:47.74	15	Did not advance	
Dennis Licht	5000 metres	13:57.61	28	—N/a		Did not advance	
Solomon Bockarie; Patrick van Luijk; Liemarvin Bonevacia; Hensley Paulina	4 × 100 metres relay	38.41 SB	8	—N/a		Did not advance	

Field events

Athlete	Event	Qualification		Final	
Athlete	Event	Distance	Position	Distance	Position
Ignisious Gaisah	Long jump	7.77	22	Did not advance	

Combined events – Decathlon

Athlete	Event	100 m	LJ	SP	HJ	400 m	110H	DT	PV	JT	1500 m	Final	Rank
Pieter Braun	Result	11.11	7.29	13.90	2.04 SB	48.24	14.37	42.09	4.90 PB	56.95	4:32.46	8114	12
Pieter Braun	Points	836	883	722	840	898	927	707	880	692	729	8114	12
Eelco Sintnicolaas	Result	10.62 PB	7.50	14.65	1.92	47.93 SB	DNS	–	–	–	–	DNF	–
Eelco Sintnicolaas	Points	947	935	768	731	913	–	–	–	–	–	DNF	–

=== Women ===
Track and road events

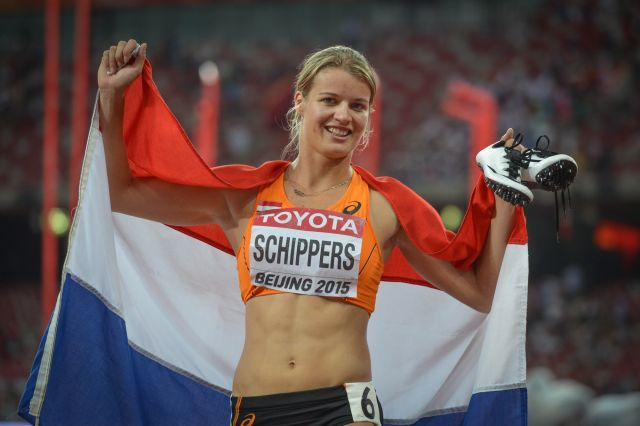
Dafne Schippers after winning silver in the 100m

Athlete	Event	Heat		Semifinal		Final	
Athlete	Event	Result	Rank	Result	Rank	Result	Rank
Jamile Samuel	100 metres	DQ		Did not advance			
Naomi Sedney	100 metres	11.41	30	Did not advance			
Dafne Schippers	100 metres	11.01	5 Q	10.83 NR	2 Q	10.81 NR	2nd place, silver medalist(s)
Dafne Schippers	200 metres	22.58	5 Q	22.36	6 Q	21.63 CR, ER, WL	1st place, gold medalist(s)
Sifan Hassan	800 metres	1:59.94	7 Q	1:58.50 PB	5	Did not advance	
Sifan Hassan	1500 metres	4:09.52	22 Q	4:15.38	12 Q	4:09.34	3rd place, bronze medalist(s)
Maureen Koster	1500 metres	4:05.55	6 Q	4:10.95	9	Did not advance	
Maureen Koster	5000 metres	DNF		—N/a		Did not advance	
Susan Kuijken	5000 metres	15:25.67	8 Q	—N/a		15:08.00	8
Susan Kuijken	10,000 metres	—N/a				31:54.32	10
Jip Vastenburg	10,000 metres	—N/a				32:03.03	11
Jamile Samuel; Dafne Schippers; Nadine Visser; Naomi Sedney	4 × 100 metres relay	42.32 NR	4 Q	—N/a		DQ	

Field events

Athlete	Event	Qualification		Final	
Athlete	Event	Distance	Position	Distance	Position
Femke Pluim	Pole vault	4.30	21	Did not advance	

Combined events – Heptathlon

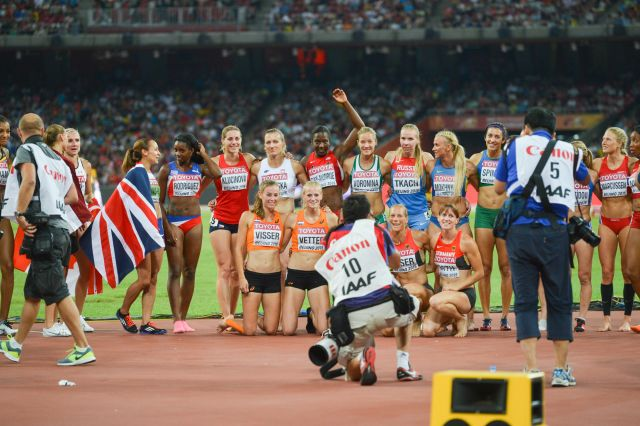

Athlete	Event	100H	HJ	SP	200 m	LJ	JT	800 m	Final	Rank
Nadine Broersen	Result	13.55	1.86 SB	14.59	25.41	6.20	53.52	2:16.58	6491	4
Nadine Broersen	Points	1043	1054	833	850	912	928	871	6491	4
Anouk Vetter	Result	13.61	1.77 SB	14.24	24.53	6.11	51.78	2:23.71	6267	12
Anouk Vetter	Points	1034	941	810	930	883	895	774	6267	12
Nadine Visser	Result	12.81 PB	1.80 PB	13.16	23.78	6.14	40.07	2:13.72 PB	6344	8
Nadine Visser	Points	1153	978	738	1002	893	669	911	6344	8
