= Barbados at the 2015 World Championships in Athletics =

- WA code: BAR

in Beijing
- Competitors: 6
- Medals: Gold 0 Silver 0 Bronze 0 Total 0

World Championships in Athletics appearances
- 1983; 1987; 1991; 1993; 1995; 1997; 1999; 2001; 2003; 2005; 2007; 2009; 2011; 2013; 2015; 2017; 2019; 2022; 2023

Barbados competed at the 2015 World Championships in Athletics in Beijing, China, from 22 to 30 August 2015.

== Results ==
(q – qualified, NM – no mark, SB – season best)

=== Men ===
Track and road events

| Athlete | Event | Heat | | Semifinal | | Final | |
| Athlete | Event | Result | Rank | Result | Rank | Result | Rank |
|---|---|---|---|---|---|---|---|
| Ramon Gittens | 100 metres | 10.02 PB | 9 Q | 10.04 | 12 | did not advance | |
| Levi Cadogan | 100 metres | 10.12 | 21 q | 10.19 | 19 | did not advance | |
| Shane Brathwaite | 110 metres hurdles | 13.28 | 3 Q | 13.31 | 10 | did not advance | |
| Greggmar Swift | 110 metres hurdles | 13.41 | 9 Q | 13.44 | 17 | did not advance | |

=== Women ===
Track and road events

| Athlete | Event | Heat | | Semifinal | | Final | |
| Athlete | Event | Result | Rank | Result | Rank | Result | Rank |
|---|---|---|---|---|---|---|---|
| Kierre Beckles | 100 metres hurdles | 12.88 NR | 9 Q | 12.90 | 12 | did not advance | |

Combined events – Heptathlon

| Athlete | Event | 100H | HJ | SP | 200 m | LJ | JT | 800 m | Final | Rank |
|---|---|---|---|---|---|---|---|---|---|---|
| Akela Jones | Result | 13.17 | 1.80 | 12.73 | 24.70 | 6.09 | DNS | | DNF | |
| Akela Jones | Points | 1099 | 978 | 709 | 915 | 877 | DNS | | DNF | |
