= 2015 World Championships in Athletics – Women's 400 metres hurdles =

Women's 400 metres hurdles at the 2015 World Championships in Athletics
- Venue: Beijing National Stadium
- Location: Beijing, China
- Dates: 23 August 2015 (heats); 24 August 2015 (semifinals); 26 August 2015 (final)
- Competitors: 37 from 27 nations
- Winning time: 53.50 s

Medalists
gold medal	Zuzana Hejnová	Czech Republic
silver medal	Shamier Little	United States
bronze medal	Cassandra Tate	United States

The women's 400 metres hurdles at the 2015 World Championships in Athletics was held at the Beijing National Stadium on 23, 24 and 26 August.

== Summary ==
Zuzana Hejnová of the Czech Republic entered the competition as the defending champion.

Through these championships Cassandra Tate had been the #1 qualifier in the heats and #2 in the semi-finals, earning her a center lane position next to #1 qualifier, the defending champion Hejnová. The world leader coming into the event was World Junior Champion Shamier Little. While Little had been almost mechanical in winning the NCAA Championships, the US Championships and the Pan American Games over a long season, in this championship she struggled through the rounds, the slowest qualifier in both. Her slow time in the semi relegated her to the inside lane, lane 2 on Beijing's 9 lane track. In the finals, those were the players, with Hejnová in a clear lead by the final turn, with Little and Tate chasing. Hejnová just continued to build her lead unchallenged to the finish, as Little struggled over hurdle 8, stretching to 9 and again awkward at 10. Still Little's strength was able to beat Tate to the line for silver. Sara Petersen made a late rush at Tate coming into the 10th hurdle, but Tate carried her momentum better into the finish to claim bronze.

== Records ==
Prior to the competition, the records were as follows:

World record	Yuliya Pechonkina (RUS)	52.34	Tula, Russia	8 August 2003
Championship record	Melaine Walker (JAM)	52.42	Berlin, Germany	20 August 2009
World leading	Shamier Little (USA)	53.74	Eugene, United States	13 June 2015
African record	Nezha Bidouane (MAR)	52.90	Seville, Spain	25 August 1999
Asian record	Qing Han (CHN)	53.96	Beijing, China	9 September 1993
NACAC record	Melaine Walker (JAM)	52.42	Berlin, Germany	20 August 2009
South American record	Lucimar Teodoro (BRA)	55.84	Belém, Brazil	24 May 2009
European record	Yuliya Pechonkina (RUS)	52.34	Tula, Russia	8 August 2003
Oceanian record	Debbie Flintoff-King (AUS)	53.17	Seoul, South Korea	27 September 1988
The following records were established during the competition:
World leading	Zuzana Hejnová (CZE)	53.50	Beijing, China	26 August 2015

== Qualification standards ==
Entry standards
56.20

== Schedule ==
Date	Time	Round
23 August 2015	10:25	Heats
24 August 2015	19:10	Semifinals
26 August 2015	20:10	Final

All times are local times (UTC+8)

== Results ==
=== Heats ===
Qualification: Best 4 (Q) and next 4 fastest (q) qualify for the next round.

Rank	Heat	Name	Nationality	Time	Notes
1	3	Cassandra Tate	United States	54.27	Q
2	3	Wenda Nel	South Africa	54.45	Q
3	3	Meghan Beesley	Great Britain & N.I.	54.52	Q, PB
4	2	Zuzana Hejnová	Czech Republic	54.55	Q
5	2	Eilidh Child	Great Britain & N.I.	54.74	Q
6	1	Kaliese Spencer	Jamaica	55.03	Q
7	5	Janieve Russell	Jamaica	55.09	Q
8	4	Sara Petersen	Denmark	55.11	Q
9	5	Denisa Rosolová	Czech Republic	55.33	Q
10	3	Stina Troest	Denmark	55.56	Q, PB
11	2	Anna Yaroshchuk-Ryzhykova	Ukraine	55.58	Q, SB
12	4	Lauren Wells	Australia	55.65	Q, SB
13	2	Léa Sprunger	Switzerland	55.71	Q
14	4	Vera Rudakova	Russia	55.76	Q
15	1	Sparkle McKnight	Trinidad and Tobago	55.77	Q
16	3	Axelle Dauwens	Belgium	55.84	q, SB
17	1	Elise Malmberg	Sweden	55.97	Q
18	2	Sage Watson	Canada	56.08	q
19	1	Eglė Staišiūnaitė	Lithuania	56.17	Q, PB
20	1	Aurélie Chaboudez	France	56.19	q
21	4	Kori Carter	United States	56.22	Q
22	3	Déborah Rodríguez	Uruguay	56.30	q, NR
23	5	Petra Fontanive	Switzerland	56.40	Q
24	5	Shamier Little	United States	56.47	Q
25	5	Joanna Linkiewicz	Poland	56.51	
26	1	Amalie Iuel	Norway	56.59	
27	4	Shevon Stoddart	Jamaica	56.60	
28	5	Nguyen Thi Huyen	Vietnam	57.31	
29	4	Viktoriya Tkachuk	Ukraine	57.38	
30	3	Ristananna Tracey	Jamaica	57.60	
31	4	Hayat Lambarki	Morocco	58.05	
32	1	Xiao Xia	China	58.12	
33	5	Amaka Ogoegbunam	Nigeria	58.16	
34	3	Ghofrane Mohammad	Syria	58.61	SB
35	2	Francisca Koki Manunga	Kenya	58.96	DQ
36	2	Yadisleidy Pedroso	Italy	1:25.15	
	1	Kemi Adekoya	Bahrain	DQ	R168.7(a)

=== Semifinals ===
Qualification: Best 2 (Q) and next 2 fastest (q) qualify for the next round.

Rank	Heat	Name	Nationality	Time	Notes
1	3	Zuzana Hejnová	Czech Republic	54.24	Q
2	1	Cassandra Tate	United States	54.33	Q
3	2	Sara Petersen	Denmark	54.34	Q
4	2	Kaliese Spencer	Jamaica	54.45	Q
5	1	Wenda Nel	South Africa	54.63	Q
6	3	Janieve Russell	Jamaica	54.78	Q, SB
7	1	Eilidh Child	Great Britain & N.I.	54.80	q
8	2	Shamier Little	United States	54.86	q
9	1	Anna Yaroshchuk-Ryzhykova	Ukraine	55.16	SB
10	3	Meghan Beesley	Great Britain & N.I.	55.41	
11	2	Denisa Rosolová	Czech Republic	55.73	
12	1	Axelle Dauwens	Belgium	55.82	SB
13	1	Léa Sprunger	Switzerland	55.83	
14	3	Lauren Wells	Australia	56.04	
15	3	Stina Troest	Denmark	56.13	
15	3	Aurélie Chaboudez	France	56.13	
17	2	Sparkle McKnight	Trinidad and Tobago	56.21	
18	2	Petra Fontanive	Switzerland	56.35	
19	2	Sage Watson	Canada	56.38	
20	1	Vera Rudakova	Russia	56.41	
21	1	Déborah Rodríguez	Uruguay	56.47	
22	2	Eglė Staišiūnaitė	Lithuania	56.48	
23	3	Elise Malmberg	Sweden	56.58	
	3	Kori Carter	United States	DNF	

=== Final ===
The final was started at 20:10.

Rank	Lane	Name	Nationality	Time	Notes
1st place, gold medalist(s)	5	Zuzana Hejnová	Czech Republic	53.50	WL
2nd place, silver medalist(s)	2	Shamier Little	United States	53.94	
3rd place, bronze medalist(s)	6	Cassandra Tate	United States	54.02	
4	4	Sara Petersen	Denmark	54.20	
5	9	Janieve Russell	Jamaica	54.65	PB
6	3	Eilidh Child	Great Britain & N.I.	54.78	
7	8	Wenda Nel	South Africa	54.94	
8	7	Kaliese Spencer	Jamaica	55.47	
