= Lyubov Tkach =

Russian heptathlete (born 1993)

Personal information
- Born: 18 February 1993 (age 33)

Sport
- Country: Russia
- Sport: Track and field
- Event: Heptathlon
- Updated on 29 August 2015

Lyubov Tkach (Russian: Любовь Ткач; born 18 February 1993) is a Russian athlete competing in the heptathlon. She represented her country at the 2015 World Championships in Beijing finishing 23rd. Earlier that year she won the silver medal at the 2015 European U23 Championships.

Her main personal bests are 6151 points in the heptathlon (Cheboksary 2015) and 4368 points in the indoor pentathlon (Saint Petersburg 2015).

== Competition record ==
Year	Competition	Venue	Position	Event	Notes
Representing Russia
2015	European U23 Championships	Tallinn, Estonia	2nd	Heptathlon	6055 pts
2015	World Championships	Beijing, China	23rd	Heptathlon	5729 pts

== Personal bests ==
Outdoor
- 200 metres – 24.22 (+1.7 m/s) (Cheboksary 2015)
- 800 metres – 2:16.35 (Tallinn 2015)
- 100 metres hurdles – 14.59 (+0.2 m/s) (Cheboksary 2014)
- High jump – 1.77 (Cheboksary 2015)
- Long jump – 6.08 (+0.5 m/s) (Tallinn 2015)
- Shot put – 14.81 (Cheboksary 2015)
- Javelin throw – 45.85 (Tallinn 2015)
- Heptathlon – 6151 (Cheboksary 2015)
Indoor
- 800 metres – 2:21.02 (Novocheboksarsk 2014)
- 60 metres hurdles – 9.01 (Saint Petersburg 2015)
- High jump – 1.81 (Saint Petersburg 2015)
- Long jump – 5.98 (Saint Petersburg 2015)
- Shot put – 14.77 (Saint Petersburg 2015)
- Pentathlon – 4368 (Saint Petersburg 2015)
