= Nigeria at the 2015 World Championships in Athletics =

- WA code: NGR

in Beijing
- Competitors: 16
- Medals: Gold 0 Silver 0 Bronze 0 Total 0

World Championships in Athletics appearances
- 1983; 1987; 1991; 1993; 1995; 1997; 1999; 2001; 2003; 2005; 2007; 2009; 2011; 2013; 2015; 2017; 2019; 2022; 2023; 2025

Nigeria competed at the 2015 World Championships in Athletics in Beijing, China, from 22–30 August 2015. It did not win any medals.

== Results ==
(q – qualified, NM – no mark, SB – season best)

=== Men ===
Track and road events

Athlete	Event	Heat		Semifinal		Final	
Athlete	Event	Result	Rank	Result	Rank	Result	Rank
Tega Odele	200 metres	20.49	6	Did not advance			
Miles Ukaoma	400 metres hurdles	49.38	5	Did not advance			

Field events

Athlete	Event	Qualification		Final	
Athlete	Event	Result	Rank	Result	Rank
Tosin Oke	Triple jump	16.74	11 q	16.81	8

=== Women ===
Track and road events

Athlete	Event	Heat		Semifinal		Final	
Athlete	Event	Result	Rank	Result	Rank	Result	Rank
Blessing Okagbare	100 metres	11.07	1 Q	10.89	2 Q	11.02	8
Blessing Okagbare	200 metres	DNS	–	Did not advance			
Tosin Adeloye	400 metres	52.42	5	Did not advance			
Regina George	400 metres	51.74	4	Did not advance			
Patience Okon George	400 metres	50.87	3 Q	50.76 PB	4	Did not advance	
Lindsay Lindley	100 metres hurdles	13.30	6	Did not advance			
Amaka Ogoegbunam	400 metres hurdles	58.16	7	Did not advance			
Gloria Asumnu; Cecilia Francis; Stephanie Kalu; Deborah Oluwaseun Odeyemi	4 × 100 metres relay	43.89	8	—N/a		Did not advance	
Tosin Adeloye; Regina George; Patience Okon George; Funke Oladoye	4 × 400 metres relay	3:23.27 SB	1 Q	—N/a		3:25.11	5

Field events

Athlete	Event	Qualification		Final	
Athlete	Event	Result	Rank	Result	Rank
Doreen Amata	High jump	1.92	1 q	1.88	12

Combined events – Heptathlon

Athlete	Event	100H	HJ	SP	200 m	LJ	JT	800 m	Final	Rank
Uhunoma Osazuwa	Result	13.75	1.83	11.79	24.36	6.21 SB	36.88	2:21.36 PB	5951	18
Uhunoma Osazuwa	Points	1014	1016	647	946	915	608	805	5951	18
