= Czech Republic at the 2015 World Championships in Athletics =

- WA code: CZE
- National federation: Český atletický svaz

in Beijing
- Competitors: 25
- Medals Ranked 15th: Gold 1 Silver 0 Bronze 0 Total 1

World Championships in Athletics appearances
- 1993; 1995; 1997; 1999; 2001; 2003; 2005; 2007; 2009; 2011; 2013; 2015; 2017; 2019; 2022; 2023; 2025

Czech Republic competed at the 2015 World Championships in Athletics in Beijing, China, from 22–30 August 2015.

== Medalists ==
Medal	Athlete	Event	Date
Gold	Zuzana Hejnová	Women's 400 metres hurdles	26 August

== Results ==
(q – qualified, NM – no mark, SB – season best)

=== Men ===
Track and road events

Athlete	Event	Heat		Semifinal		Final	
Athlete	Event	Result	Rank	Result	Rank	Result	Rank
Pavel Maslák	400 metres	45.16	22	did not advance			
Jakub Holuša	1500 metres	3:43.66	30	did not advance			
Petr Svoboda	110 metres hurdles	DQ		13.67	23	did not advance	
Lukáš Gdula	50 kilometres walk	—N/a				DQ	

Field events

Athlete	Event	Qualification		Final	
Athlete	Event	Distance	Position	Distance	Position
Jaroslav Bába	High jump	2.31 SB	8 Q	2.29	7
Michal Balner	Pole vault	5.70	7 Q	5.65	7
Jan Kudlička	Pole vault	5.70	1 Q	5.50	13
Radek Juška	Long jump	7.98	12 q	7.57	11
Jan Marcell	Shot put	20.32	11 q	19.69	10
Tomáš Staněk	Shot put	19.64	19	did not advance	
Lukáš Melich	Hammer throw	72.12	20	did not advance	
Petr Frydrych	Javelin throw	74.24	30	did not advance	
Jakub Vadlejch	Javelin throw	78.95	20	did not advance	
Vítězslav Veselý	Javelin throw	83.63	4 Q	83.13	8

Combined events – Decathlon

Athlete	Event	100 m	LJ	SP	HJ	400 m	110H	DT	PV	JT	1500 m	Final	Rank
Adam Helcelet	Result	11.09	7.29	15.30 PB	2.04	49.66 SB	14.20 PB	42.90	4.90 SB	63.07 SB	4:37.65 PB	8234 SB	11
Adam Helcelet	Points	841	883	808	840	830	949	724	880	784	695	8234 SB	11

=== Women ===
Track and road events

Athlete	Event	Heat		Semifinal		Final	
Athlete	Event	Result	Rank	Result	Rank	Result	Rank
Zuzana Hejnová	400 metres hurdles	54.55	4 Q	54.24	1 Q	53.50 WL	1st place, gold medalist(s)
Denisa Rosolová	400 metres hurdles	55.33	9 Q	55.73	11	did not advance	
Lucie Sekanová	3000 metres steeplechase	9:45.72	27	—N/a		did not advance	
Anežka Drahotová	20 kilometres walk	—N/a				1:30.32	8
Lucie Pelantová	20 kilometres walk	—N/a				1:38.34	36

Field events

Athlete	Event	Qualification		Final	
Athlete	Event	Distance	Position	Distance	Position
Oldřiška Marešová	High jump	1.89	19	did not advance	
Jiřina Ptáčníková	Pole vault	No mark		did not advance	
Tereza Králová	Hammer throw	61.39	30	did not advance	
Barbora Špotáková	Javelin throw	65.02	3 Q	60.08	9

Combined events – Heptathlon

Athlete	Event	100H	HJ	SP	200 m	LJ	JT	800 m	Final	Rank
Eliška Klučinová	Result	14.06	1.86	13.79	25.39	6.10	51.09 PB	2:19.48	6247	13
Eliška Klučinová	Points	970	1054	780	851	880	881	831	6247	13
