= 2015 World Championships in Athletics – Men's 200 metres =

Men's 200 metres at the 2015 World Championships
- Venue: Beijing National Stadium
- Dates: 25 August (heats); 26 August (semifinals); 27 August (final)
- Competitors: 58 from 44 nations
- Winning time: 19.55

Medalists
gold medal	Usain Bolt	Jamaica
silver medal	Justin Gatlin	United States
bronze medal	Anaso Jobodwana	South Africa

Video on YouTube Official Video @3:35

The men's 200 metres at the 2015 World Championships in Athletics was held at the Beijing National Stadium on 25, 26 and 27 August. The winning margin was 0.19 seconds.

== Records ==
Prior to the competition, the records were as follows:

World record	Usain Bolt (JAM)	19.19	Berlin, Germany	20 August 2009
Championship record	Usain Bolt (JAM)	19.19	Berlin, Germany	20 August 2009
World Leading	Justin Gatlin (USA)	19.57	Eugene, OR, United States	28 June 2015
African record	Frankie Fredericks (NAM)	19.68	Atlanta, GA, United States	1 August 1996
Asian record	Shingo Suetsugu (JPN)	20.03	Yokohama, Japan	7 June 2003
North, Central American and Caribbean record	Usain Bolt (JAM)	19.19	Berlin, Germany	20 August 2009
South American record	Alonso Edward (PAN)	19.81	Berlin, Germany	20 August 2009
European record	Pietro Mennea (ITA)	19.72A	Mexico City, Mexico	12 September 1979
Oceanian record	Peter Norman (AUS)	20.06A	Mexico City, Mexico	15 October 1968
The following records were established during the competition:
World leading	Usain Bolt (JAM)	19.55	Beijing, China	27 August 2015

== Qualification standards ==
Entry standards
20.50

== Schedule ==
Date	Time	Round
25 August 2015	19:30	Heats
26 August 2015	20:30	Semifinals
27 August 2015	20:55	Final

All times are local times (UTC+8)

== Results ==
=== Heats ===
Qualification: First 3 in each heat (Q) and the next 3 fastest (q) advanced to the semifinals.

Rank	Heat	Name	Nationality	Time	Notes
1	1	Ramil Guliyev	Turkey	20.01	Q, NR
2	2	Alonso Edward	Panama	20.11	Q
3	5	Zharnel Hughes	Great Britain & N.I.	20.13	Q
4	6	Lykourgos-Stefanos Tsakonas	Greece	20.14	Q
5	5	Julian Forte	Jamaica	20.16	Q
6	5	Brendon Rodney	Canada	20.18	Q, PB
7	4	Justin Gatlin	United States	20.19	Q
8	2	Churandy Martina	Netherlands	20.22	Q, SB
8	7	Anaso Jobodwana	South Africa	20.22	Q
10	5	Akani Simbine	South Africa	20.23	q, PB
11	6	Warren Weir	Jamaica	20.24	Q, SB
12	7	Femi Ogunode	Qatar	20.25	Q
13	1	Kenji Fujimitsu	Japan	20.28	Q
13	3	Usain Bolt	Jamaica	20.28	Q
15	2	Christophe Lemaitre	France	20.29	Q
15	3	Roberto Skyers	Cuba	20.29	Q
17	5	Jeremy Dodson	Samoa	20.31	q, NR
18	2	Kei Takase	Japan	20.33	q
19	3	Yancarlos Martínez	Dominican Republic	20.34	Q
20	4	Abdul Hakim Sani Brown	Japan	20.35	Q
20	6	Daniel Talbot	Great Britain & N.I.	20.35	Q
22	1	Reynier Mena	Cuba	20.37	Q
23	7	Miguel Francis	Antigua and Barbuda	20.38	Q
24	1	Hua Wilfried Koffi	Ivory Coast	20.39	SB
25	4	Nickel Ashmeade	Jamaica	20.40	Q
26	2	Bruno de Barros	Brazil	20.42	
27	4	Carvin Nkanata	Kenya	20.43	
27	7	Aaron Brown	Canada	20.43	
29	4	Jeffrey John	France	20.48	
30	2	Tega Odele	Nigeria	20.49	
31	1	Mike Mokamba Nyang'au	Kenya	20.51	
31	3	Julian Reus	Germany	20.51	
31	1	Isiah Young	United States	20.51	
31	7	Kyle Greaux	Trinidad and Tobago	20.51	
35	3	Julius Morris	Montserrat	20.56	
36	7	Aldemir da Silva Junior	Brazil	20.59	
37	5	Serhiy Smelyk	Ukraine	20.60	
38	6	Robin Erewa	Germany	20.67	
39	4	Antoine Adams	Saint Kitts and Nevis	20.75	
40	6	Karol Zalewski	Poland	20.77	
41	5	Sibusiso Matsenjwa	Swaziland	20.78	SB
42	6	Adama Jammeh	Gambia	20.81	SB
43	3	Teray Smith	Bahamas	20.91	
44	5	Harold Houston	Bermuda	20.92	
45	3	Sydney Siame	Zambia	21.08	
46	2	Tatenda Tsumba	Zimbabwe	21.21	
47	1	Mohammed Abukhousa	Palestine	21.36	SB
48	6	Mosito Lehata	Lesotho	21.43	
49	1	Liaquat Ali	Pakistan	21.55	
50	2	Luka Rakić	Montenegro	21.86	
51	4	Phearath Nget	Cambodia	22.11	
52	3	Mauriel Carty	Anguilla	22.63	SB
53	4	Jerai Torres	Gibraltar	22.77	SB
54	2	Beouch Ngirchongor	Northern Mariana Islands	23.93	PB
	7	Xie Zhenye	China	DQ	20.35
	7	Álex Quiñónez	Ecuador	DQ	
	1	Ahmed Ali	Sudan	DQ	
	3	Rolando Palacios	Honduras	DQ	
	4	Mohammad Hossein Abareghi	Iran	DNS	
	6	Wallace Spearmon	United States	DNS	

=== Semifinals ===
Qualification: First 2 in each heat (Q) and the next 2 fastest (q) advanced to the final.

Rank	Heat	Name	Nationality	Time	Notes
1	2	Justin Gatlin	United States	19.87	Q
2	3	Usain Bolt	Jamaica	19.95	Q, SB
3	3	Anaso Jobodwana	South Africa	20.01	Q, PB
4	2	Alonso Edward	Panama	20.02	Q
5	2	Femi Ogunode	Qatar	20.05	q, NR
6	3	Ramil Guliyev	Turkey	20.10	q
7	1	Zharnel Hughes	Great Britain & N.I.	20.14	Q
7	3	Miguel Francis	Antigua and Barbuda	20.14	
9	1	Nickel Ashmeade	Jamaica	20.19	Q
10	1	Churandy Martina	Netherlands	20.20	SB
11	1	Lykourgos-Stefanos Tsakonas	Greece	20.22	
12	3	Roberto Skyers	Cuba	20.23	
13	3	Daniel Talbot	Great Britain & N.I.	20.27	PB
14	2	Yancarlos Martínez	Dominican Republic	20.31	
15	1	Christophe Lemaitre	France	20.34	
15	3	Kenji Fujimitsu	Japan	20.34	
17	1	Akani Simbine	South Africa	20.37	
18	1	Warren Weir	Jamaica	20.43	
19	1	Brendon Rodney	Canada	20.46	
20	2	Abdul Hakim Sani Brown	Japan	20.47	
21	2	Jeremy Dodson	Samoa	20.53	
22	2	Reynier Mena	Cuba	20.56	
23	2	Julian Forte	Jamaica	20.57	
24	3	Kei Takase	Japan	20.64	

=== Final ===
The final was held at 20:55.

Rank	Lane	Name	Nationality	Time	Notes
1st place, gold medalist(s)	6	Usain Bolt	Jamaica	19.55	WL
2nd place, silver medalist(s)	4	Justin Gatlin	United States	19.74	
3rd place, bronze medalist(s)	7	Anaso Jobodwana	South Africa	19.87	NR
4	9	Alonso Edward	Panama	19.87	SB
5	5	Zharnel Hughes	Great Britain & N.I.	20.02	PB
6	3	Ramil Guliyev	Turkey	20.11	
7	2	Femi Ogunode	Qatar	20.27	
8	8	Nickel Ashmeade	Jamaica	20.33	
