= 2015 European Athletics U23 Championships – Women's heptathlon =

The women's heptathlon event at the 2015 European Athletics U23 Championships was held in Tallinn, Estonia, at Kadriorg Stadium on 9 and 10 July.

== Medalists ==
Gold	Xénia Krizsán; Hungary
Silver	Lyubov Tkach; Russia
Bronze	Ivona Dadic; Austria

== Results ==
=== Final ===
9/10 July

The highest mark recorded in each event is highlighted in yellow

Rank	Name	Nationality	100m H	HJ	SP	200m	LJ	JT	800m	Points	Notes
1st place, gold medalist(s)	Xénia Krizsán	Hungary	13.67 (w: -0.3 m/s)	1.76	14.29	24.72 (w: 2.0 m/s)	6.00 (w: -0.7 m/s)	49.78	2:13.28	6303	SB
2nd place, silver medalist(s)	Lyubov Tkach	Russia	14.65 (w: -1.1 m/s)	1.73	14.24	24.45 (w: 2.0 m/s)	6.08 (w: 0.5 m/s)	45.85	2:16.35	6055	
3rd place, bronze medalist(s)	Ivona Dadic	Austria	14.08 (w: -1.1 m/s)	1.73	12.78	24.11 (w: 2.0 m/s)	6.08 (w: -1.4 m/s)	44.70	2:17.36	6033	NR NUR PB
4	Verena Preiner	Austria	14.23 (w: -1.1 m/s)	1.67	13.44	25.44 (w: 0.3 m/s)	5.75 (w: 0.7 m/s)	45.30	2:12.43	5840	PB
5	Grete Šadeiko	Estonia	14.36 (w: -0.3 m/s)	1.76	12.61	24.52 (w: 2.0 m/s)	5.78 (w: -0.1 m/s)	41.37	2:18.26	5813	PB
6	Lucia Mokrášová	Slovakia	14.01 (w: -0.3 m/s)	1.70	12.54	24.56 (w: 2.0 m/s)	5.93 (w: -0.6 m/s)	39.68	2:18.93	5784	SB
7	Elodie Jakob	Switzerland	13.79 (w: -0.3 m/s)	1.61	11.51	25.19 (w: 0.3 m/s)	5.91 (w: -2.8 m/s)	47.36	2:17.22	5746	PB
8	Jutta Heikkinen	Finland	14.45 (w: -1.1 m/s)	1.73	11.83	25.22 (w: 0.3 m/s)	5.83 (w: -0.1 m/s)	44.06	2:18.20	5715	PB
9	Miia Sillman	Finland	14.60 (w: -1.1 m/s)	1.76	12.49	25.75 (w: 0.3 m/s)	5.82 (w: -0.4 m/s)	43.00	2:30.72	5540	PB
10	Magdalena Sochoń	Poland	14.22 (w: -0.3 m/s)	1.61	11.69	24.56 (w: 2.0 m/s)	5.71 (w: -1.2 m/s)	35.09	2:12.04	5533	
11	Hertta Heikkinen	Finland	14.38 (w: -1.1 m/s)	1.67	11.95	25.37 (w: 0.3 m/s)	5.60 (w: -0.2 m/s)	36.98	2:19.32	5425	PB
12	Patricia Ortega	Spain	14.28 (w: -0.3 m/s)	1.70	10.99	25.45 (w: 2.0 m/s)	5.31 (w: -0.3 m/s)	32.07	2:20.96	5206	
	Frida Thorsås	Norway	16.78 (w: -1.1 m/s)	1.61	11.06	26.82 (w: 0.3 m/s)	3.93 (w: -1.7 m/s)			DNF	
	Malin Skogström	Sweden	14.14 (w: -0.3 m/s)	1.64	9.75	25.88 (w: 0.3 m/s)				DNF	

== Participation ==
According to an unofficial count, 14 athletes from 11 countries participated in the event.

- Austria (2)
- Estonia (1)
- Finland (3)
- Hungary (1)
- Norway (1)
- Poland (1)
- Russia (1)
- Slovakia (1)
- Spain (1)
- Sweden (1)
- Switzerland (1)
