= Laura Ikauniece =

Latvian heptathlete

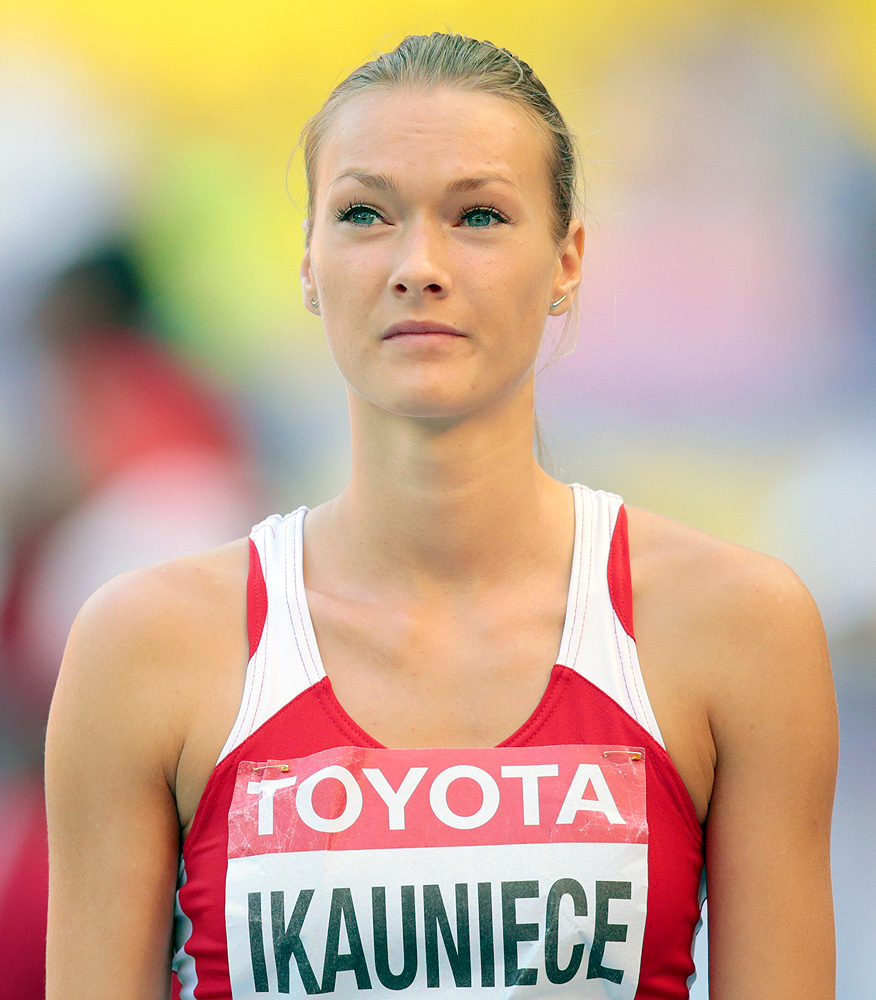

Personal information
- Nationality: Latvian
- Born: 31 May 1992 (age 34) Ventspils, Latvia
- Height: 1.79 m (5 ft 10 in)
- Weight: 60 kg (132 lb)

Sport
- Country: Latvia
- Sport: Track and field
- Event: Heptathlon
- Coached by: Andrei Nazarov(2016-present) Andis Austrups (til 2016)

Achievements and titles
- Personal best: Heptathlon: 6815 points
Medal record
Women's athletics
Representing Latvia
World Championships
Bronze medal – third place	2015 Beijing	Heptathlon
European Championships
Silver medal – second place	2012 Helsinki	Heptathlon

Laura Ikauniece (formerly Laura Ikauniece-Admidiņa; born 31 May 1992) is a Latvian athlete competing in heptathlon. She participated in two Olympic Games, finishing fourth in Rio de Janeiro in 2016. She won a silver medal at the 2012 European Athletics Championships, and a bronze medal at the 2015 World Athletics Championships. She set a Latvian record in the heptathlon (6,815 points) and a Latvian record in the indoor pentathlon (4,701 points).

== Early life ==
She was coached from a young age by Andis Austrups, and started working with him when she was nine years-old. She studied at the University of Latvia (UL) Faculty of Education, Psychology and Art (FEPA).

== Career ==
She won a silver medal at the 2009 World Youth Championships in Italy, reaching 5647 points. Later that year she competed in Finland at the European Youth Olympic Festival and won high jump bronze and only missed a medal by one centimetre in the long jump. The next year she finished 6th in the World Junior Championships reaching 5618 points. In 2011 she won a bronze medal at the European Athletics Junior Championships.

Competing at the Hypo Meeting heptathlon in Austria she reached a new personal record of 6,282 points in 2012. At the 2012 European Athletics Championships Ikauniece initially won a bronze medal, after a hard fight with fellow Latvian Aiga Grabuste, finishing 10 points in front of her. Later on she was awarded with silver medal, as a result of the disqualification of Ukrainian athlete Lyudmyla Yosypenko. At the 2012 London Olympics she finished with 6414 points in seventh place overall.

She achieved 6516 points at the 2015 World Championships, where she won a bronze medal. She set a new national record for the heptathlon at the HypoMeeting in Gotzis, Austria, in 2015, of 6622 points. She finished in fourth place in the heptathlon at the 2016 Olympic Games in Rio de Janeiro.

Her personal best and also the Latvian record is 6815 points, achieved in 2017 at Hypomeeting, Götzis. Thereafter her career was hampered by injuries, resulting in her requiring surgery on six occasions.

At the 2019 European Athletics Indoor Championships in Britain, she set a new indoor pentathlon national record of 4701 points to finish in fifth place.

In 2022, Ikaunieces returned to competition after a long rehabilitation from injury, did not qualify for the European Championships and did not compete in 2023.

== Personal life ==
Her mother Vineta Ikauniece set Latvian national records in all the sprint disciplines from 60 metres to 400 metres. In 2024, she announced via her social media that she was expecting her first child with partner and fellow athlete, Magnus Kirt. The pair had previously publicly announced their relationship on Valentine's Day in 2020. Their son was born on 19 October 2024.

She was previously married to fitness trainer Rolands Admidiņš.

== Achievements ==
Year	Tournament	Venue	Result	Points	Details
2009	World Youth Championships	Brixen, Italy	2nd	5647	14.22–1.82–9.71–24.75–5.67–42.53–2:20.94
2010	World Junior Championships	Moncton, Canada	6th	5618 pts	14.57–1.69–10.80–25.47–5.85–49.04–2:21.40
2011	European Junior Championships	Tallinn, Estonia	3rd	6063	13.97–1.78–12.09–24.93–5.90–50.70–2:16.31
2012	European Championships	Helsinki, Finland	2nd	6335	13.53–1.83–11.81–24.36–6.31–47.32–2:12.82
2012	Olympic Games	London, United Kingdom	9th	6414	13.71–1.83–12.64–24.16PB-6.13–51.27–2:12.13PB
2013	World Championships	Beijing, China	9th	6159	13.89–1.80–12.36–24.73–5.96–50.75–2:16.05
2014	European Championships	Moscow, Russia	6th	6310	13.61–1.82–12.58–24.75–6.20–51.30–2:16.90
2015	World Championships	Beijing, China	3rd	6516 NR	13.21PB–1.77–12.71–23.97–6.32PB–53.67–2:13.79
2016	Olympic Games	Rio de Janeiro, Brazil	4th	6617	13.33–1.77–13.52–23.76–6.12–55.93PB–2:09:43
2017	World Championships	London, United Kingdom	–	DNF	13.71–DNS

== Personal bests ==
=== Outdoor ===
Event	Record	Wind	Venue	Date
200 metres	23.49	-2.9	Götzis	27 May 2017
800 metres	2:09.43		Rio de Janeiro	13 August 2016
100 metres hurdles	13.07	+0.5	Götzis	28 May 2016
High jump	1.87		Ogre	15 June 2019
Long jump	6.64	+0.8	Götzis	28 May 2017
Shot put	14.03		Tallinn	19 July 2018
Javelin throw	56.32		Tallinn	19 May 2017
Heptathlon	6815		Götzis	28 May 2017

=== Indoor ===
Event	Record	Venue	Date
60 metres	7.60	Kuldiga	18 January 2014
800 metres	2:14.01	Emirates Arena, Glasgow (GBR)	1 March 2019
60 metres hurdles	8.29	Emirates Arena, Glasgow (GBR)	1 March 2019
High jump	1.85	Tallinn	25 February 2012
Long jump	6.49	Riga	9 March 2016
Shot put	13.91	Tallinn	3 February 2019
Pentathlon	4701	Emirates Arena, Glasgow (GBR)	1 March 2019

Awards
Preceded by Anastasija Grigorjeva	Latvian Sportsperswoman of the Year; 2015, 2016	Succeeded by Jeļena Ostapenko
Preceded by Zigismunds Sirmais	Latvian Rising Sportspersonality of the Year; 2012	Succeeded by Zemgus Girgensons
