= 2015 World Championships in Athletics – Women's 100 metres =

Women's 100 metres at the 2015 World Championships
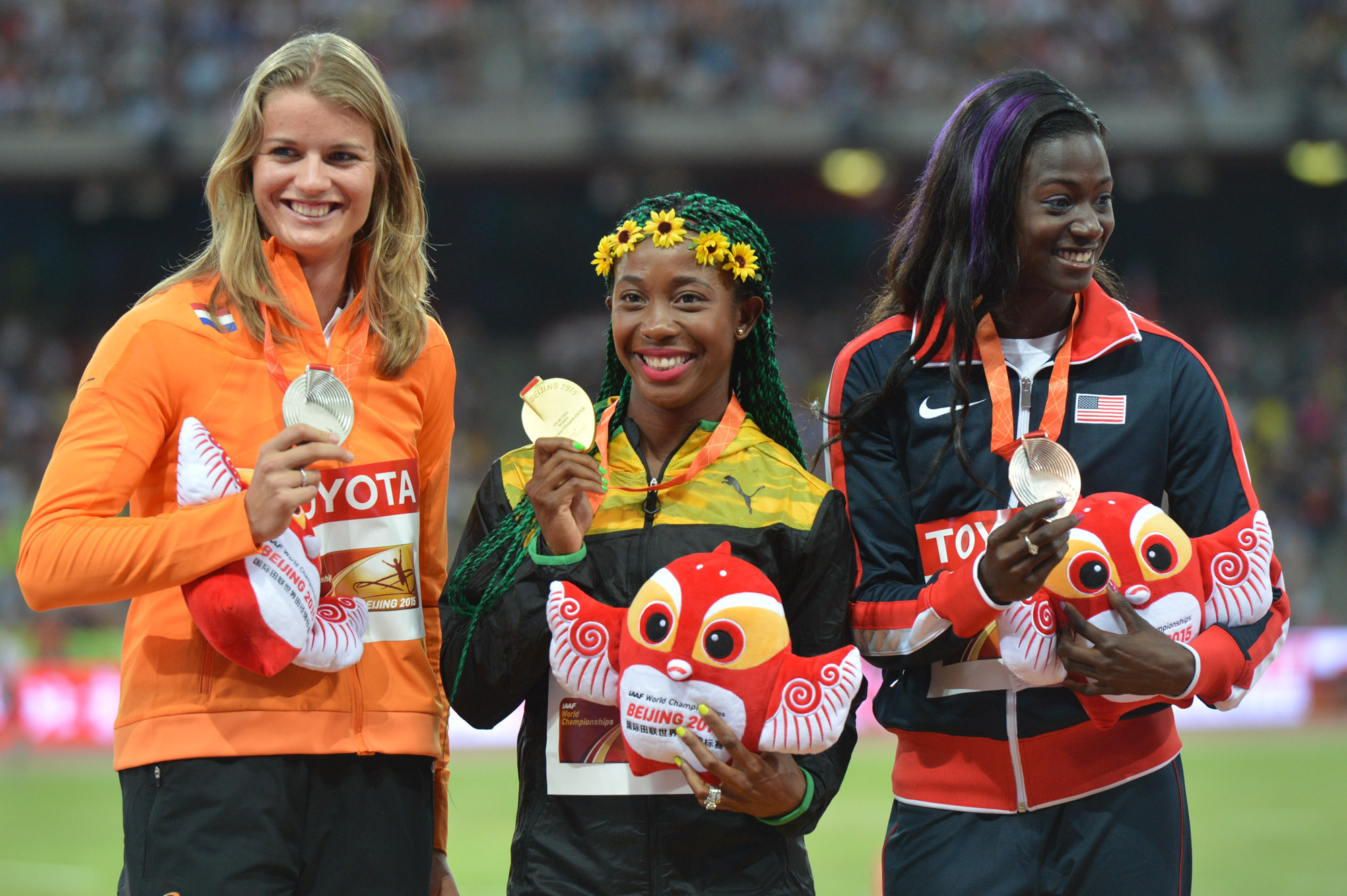
- Venue: Beijing National Stadium
- Dates: 23 August (heats); 24 August (semifinal & final)
- Competitors: 54 from 36 nations
- Winning time: 10.76

Medalists
| gold medal | Shelly-Ann Fraser-Pryce | Jamaica |
| silver medal | Dafne Schippers | Netherlands |
| bronze medal | Tori Bowie | United States |

The women's 100 metres at the 2015 World Championships in Athletics was held at the Beijing National Stadium on 23 and 24 August. Shelly-Ann Fraser-Pryce entered the competition as the defending champion and the world leading athlete that season with a time of 10.74 seconds.

== Summary ==
The semi-finals eliminated the second fastest woman in 2015, English Gardner, otherwise it was mostly the expected fastest athletes from the world list. The surprise was Dafne Schippers improving her own national record by almost a tenth of a second to 10.83 while winning the third semi-final. Previous to that, Schippers had one significant win in London at the end of July, a race that only included one other finalist, Blessing Okagbare, and had been soundly defeated by Fraser-Pryce, Gardner and Okagbare in Paris in early June. Schippers time won her a center lane position, towering next to Fraser-Pryce in the final.

In the final, the gun went off and as expected Fraser-Pryce, the "pocket rocket" was out in front, her first three steps clearly faster than the field. While Schippers had the second best reaction time of the field, she appeared to be slightly behind Natasha Morrison and Michelle-Lee Ahye with veteran Veronica Campbell-Brown out in second place behind her teammate. But as top end speed was reached, Schippers and Tori Bowie behind her began eating into the lead with every stride. She was unable to catch Fraser-Pryce who held her arms up in victory as she crossed the line, running out of time Schippers made a desperate early lean at the finish while Bowie over strided her last few steps also in desperation in third. Each of the first 5 were clearly separated by .05 of a second. Schippers 10.81 in second place improved upon her national record for the second time in the same day.

== Records ==
Prior to the competition, the records were as follows:

| World record | Florence Griffith-Joyner (USA) | 10.49 | Indianapolis, United States | 16 July 1988 |
| Championship record | Marion Jones (USA) | 10.70 | Seville, Spain | 28 August 1999 |
| World leading | Shelly-Ann Fraser-Pryce (JAM) | 10.74 | Paris, France | 4 July 2015 |
| African record | Blessing Okagbare (NGR) | 10.79 | London, United Kingdom | 27 July 2013 |
| Asian record | Li Xuemei (CHN) | 10.79 | Shanghai, China | 18 October 1997 |
| NACAC record | Florence Griffith-Joyner (USA) | 10.49 | Indianapolis, United States | 16 July 1988 |
| South American record | Ángela Tenorio (ECU) | 10.99 | Toronto, Canada | 22 July 2015 |
| European record | Christine Arron (FRA) | 10.73 | Budapest, Hungary | 19 August 1998 |
| Oceanian record | Melissa Breen (AUS) | 11.11 | Canberra, Australia | 9 February 2014 |

== Qualification standards ==
Entry standards
11.33

== Schedule ==
| Date | Time | Round |
|---|---|---|
| 23 August 2015 | 12:00 | Heats |
| 24 August 2015 | 19:40 | Semifinals |
| 24 August 2015 | 21:35 | Final |

All times are local times (UTC+8)

== Results ==
| KEY: | Q | Qualified | q | Fastest non-qualifiers | NR | National record | PB | Personal best | SB | Seasonal best |

=== Heats ===
Qualification: Best 3 (Q) and next 3 fastest (q) qualify for the next round.

Wind: Heat 1: +0.5 m/s, Heat 2: -1.3 m/s, Heat 3: -1.2 m/s Heat 4: +2.3 m/s, Heat 5: -1.6 m/s, Heat 6: +1.5 m/s, Heat 7: -0.5 m/s

| Rank | Heat | Name | Nationality | Time | Notes |
|---|---|---|---|---|---|
| 1 | 1 | Tori Bowie | United States | 10.88 | Q |
| 1 | 4 | Shelly-Ann Fraser-Pryce | Jamaica | 10.88w | Q |
| 3 | 4 | Marie-Josée Ta Lou | Ivory Coast | 10.95w | Q |
| 4 | 3 | Michelle-Lee Ahye | Trinidad and Tobago | 10.98 | Q |
| 5 | 5 | Dafne Schippers | Netherlands | 11.01 | Q |
| 6 | 1 | Veronica Campbell-Brown | Jamaica | 11.04 | Q |
| 7 | 2 | Blessing Okagbare | Nigeria | 11.07 | Q |
| 8 | 2 | Natasha Morrison | Jamaica | 11.08 | Q |
| 8 | 4 | Carina Horn | South Africa | 11.08w | Q |
| 10 | 3 | Ivet Lalova | Bulgaria | 11.09 | Q, SB |
| 11 | 3 | Murielle Ahouré | Ivory Coast | 11.10 | Q |
| 12 | 3 | Ezinne Okparaebo | Norway | 11.12 | q, SB |
| 13 | 6 | Kelly-Ann Baptiste | Trinidad and Tobago | 11.13 | Q |
| 14 | 7 | Rosângela Santos | Brazil | 11.14 | Q |
| 15 | 5 | Semoy Hackett | Trinidad and Tobago | 11.16 | Q, SB |
| 15 | 7 | English Gardner | United States | 11.16 | Q |
| 17 | 6 | Mujinga Kambundji | Switzerland | 11.17 | Q, NR |
| 18 | 6 | Sherone Simpson | Jamaica | 11.22 | Q |
| 19 | 7 | Chisato Fukushima | Japan | 11.23 | Q, SB |
| 20 | 2 | Viktoriya Zyabkina | Kazakhstan | 11.24 | Q |
| 21 | 1 | Asha Philip | Great Britain & N.I. | 11.28 | Q |
| 21 | 6 | Wei Yongli | China | 11.28 | q, PB |
| 23 | 5 | Jasmine Todd | United States | 11.29 | Q |
| 23 | 4 | Ramona Papaioannou | Cyprus | 11.29w | q |
| 23 | 4 | Rebekka Haase | Germany | 11.29w | |
| 26 | 6 | Khamica Bingham | Canada | 11.30 | |
| 27 | 3 | Crystal Emmanuel | Canada | 11.33 | |
| 28 | 1 | Gina Lückenkemper | Germany | 11.34 | |
| 29 | 5 | Olesya Povh | Ukraine | 11.40 | |
| 30 | 2 | Naomi Sedney | Netherlands | 11.41 | |
| 30 | 2 | Verena Sailer | Germany | 11.41 | |
| 32 | 7 | Maja Mihalinec | Slovenia | 11.42 | |
| 33 | 3 | Isidora Jiménez | Chile | 11.47 | |
| 33 | 5 | Tahesia Harrigan-Scott | British Virgin Islands | 11.47 | |
| 35 | 6 | Narcisa Landazuri | Ecuador | 11.48 | |
| 35 | 7 | Sheniqua Ferguson | Bahamas | 11.48 | |
| 37 | 1 | Olga Safronova | Kazakhstan | 11.49 | |
| 38 | 1 | Inna Eftimova | Bulgaria | 11.50 | |
| 39 | 4 | Nediam Vargas | Venezuela | 11.51w | |
| 40 | 5 | Kimberly Hyacinthe | Canada | 11.54 | |
| 41 | 2 | Melissa Breen | Australia | 11.61 | |
| 42 | 7 | Nataliya Pohrebnyak | Ukraine | 11.62 | |
| 42 | 7 | Andrea Purica | Venezuela | 11.62 | |
| 44 | 3 | Aziza Sbaity | Lebanon | 11.98 | |
| 45 | 6 | Hafsatu Kamara | Sierra Leone | 12.13 | |
| 46 | 5 | Adriana Alves | Angola | 12.19 | PB |
| 47 | 1 | Valentina Meredova | Turkmenistan | 12.25 | |
| 48 | 3 | Patricia Taea | Cook Islands | 12.34 | SB |
| 49 | 1 | Lidiane Lopes | Cape Verde | 12.43 | NR |
| 50 | 6 | Marlene Mevong | Equatorial Guinea | 12.56 | |
| 51 | 5 | Regine Tugade | Guam | 12.60 | |
| 52 | 2 | Lihen Jonas | Micronesia | 13.70 | |
| | 2 | Charlotte Wingfield | Malta | DQ | R162.7 |
| | 4 | Jamile Samuel | Netherlands | DQ | R162.7 |

=== Semifinals ===
Qualification: Best 2 (Q) and next 2 fastest (q) qualify for the next round.

Wind: Heat 1: +0.5 m/s, Heat 2: +0.9 m/s, Heat 3: -0.2 m/s

| Rank | Heat | Name | Nationality | Time | Notes |
|---|---|---|---|---|---|
| 1 | 1 | Shelly-Ann Fraser-Pryce | Jamaica | 10.82 | Q |
| 2 | 3 | Dafne Schippers | Netherlands | 10.83 | Q, NR |
| 3 | 2 | Tori Bowie | United States | 10.87 | Q |
| 4 | 1 | Blessing Okagbare | Nigeria | 10.89 | Q |
| 4 | 3 | Veronica Campbell-Brown | Jamaica | 10.89 | Q, SB |
| 6 | 2 | Kelly-Ann Baptiste | Trinidad and Tobago | 10.90 | Q |
| 7 | 2 | Natasha Morrison | Jamaica | 10.96 | q, PB |
| 8 | 3 | Michelle-Lee Ahye | Trinidad and Tobago | 10.97 | q, SB |
| 9 | 3 | Murielle Ahouré | Ivory Coast | 10.98 | |
| 10 | 1 | Marie-Josée Ta Lou | Ivory Coast | 11.04 | PB |
| 11 | 1 | Sherone Simpson | Jamaica | 11.06 | |
| 12 | 2 | Rosângela Santos | Brazil | 11.07 | |
| 12 | 2 | Mujinga Kambundji | Switzerland | 11.07 | NR |
| 14 | 3 | Ivet Lalova | Bulgaria | 11.13 | |
| 14 | 1 | Semoy Hackett | Trinidad and Tobago | 11.13 | SB |
| 14 | 1 | English Gardner | United States | 11.13 | |
| 17 | 3 | Carina Horn | South Africa | 11.15 | |
| 18 | 2 | Viktoriya Zyabkina | Kazakhstan | 11.19 | PB |
| 18 | 3 | Ezinne Okparaebo | Norway | 11.19 | |
| 20 | 1 | Asha Philip | Great Britain & N.I. | 11.21 | |
| 20 | 3 | Jasmine Todd | United States | 11.21 | |
| 22 | 1 | Wei Yongli | China | 11.27 | PB |
| 23 | 2 | Chisato Fukushima | Japan | 11.32 | |
| 24 | 2 | Ramona Papaioannou | Cyprus | 11.38 | |

=== Final ===
The final was started at 21:35. Wind: -0.3 m/s

| Rank | Name | Nationality | Time | Notes |
|---|---|---|---|---|
| 1st place, gold medalist(s) | Shelly-Ann Fraser-Pryce | Jamaica | 10.76 | |
| 2nd place, silver medalist(s) | Dafne Schippers | Netherlands | 10.81 | NR |
| 3rd place, bronze medalist(s) | Tori Bowie | United States | 10.86 | |
| 4 | Veronica Campbell-Brown | Jamaica | 10.91 | |
| 5 | Michelle-Lee Ahye | Trinidad and Tobago | 10.98 | |
| 6 | Kelly-Ann Baptiste | Trinidad and Tobago | 11.01 | |
| 7 | Natasha Morrison | Jamaica | 11.02 | |
| 8 | Blessing Okagbare | Nigeria | 11.02 | |
