= Xénia Krizsán =

Hungarian heptathlete

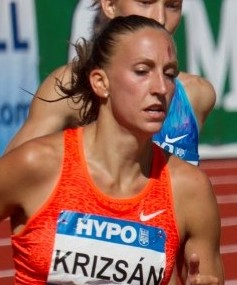

Personal information
- Born: 13 January 1993 (age 33) Budapest, Hungary

Sport
- Country: Hungary
- Sport: Athletics
- Event: Heptathlon

Achievements and titles
- Personal bests: 200 m: 24.72 (2015); 800 m: 2:11.18 (2016); 100 m hurdles: 13.51 (2016); High jump: 1.81 (2014); Long jump: 6.18 (2011); Shot put: 14.32 (2014); Javelin: 50.52 (2012); Heptathlon: 6322 (2015)
Medal record
Women's athletics
Representing Hungary
European Indoor Championships
Bronze medal – third place	2021 Toruń	Pentathlon
European U23 Championships
Gold medal – first place	2015 Tallinn	Heptathlon
World Junior Championships
Silver medal – second place	2012 Barcelona	Heptathlon

Xénia Krizsán (born 13 January 1993) is a Hungarian athlete who specialises in the heptathlon.

Krizsán won the silver medal at the 2012 World Junior Championships with a personal best of 5957 points.

== International competitions ==
Year	Competition	Venue	Position	Event	Notes
Representing Hungary
2009	World Youth Championships	Brixen, Italy	4th	Heptathlon	5353 pts
2010	World Junior Championships	Moncton, Canada	7th	Heptathlon	5594 pts, PB
2011	European Junior Championships	Tallinn, Estonia	7th	Heptathlon	5718 pts
2012	World Junior Championships	Barcelona, Spain	2nd	Heptathlon	5957 pts, PB
2013	European U23 Championships	Tampere, Finland	7th	Heptathlon	5770 pts
2014	European Championships	Zürich, Switzerland	9th	Heptathlon	6156 pts
2015	European U23 Championships	Tallinn, Estonia	1st	Heptathlon	6303 pts
2015	World Championships	Beijing, China	9th	Heptathlon	6322 pts
2016	Olympic Games	Rio de Janeiro, Brazil	16th	Heptathlon	6257 pts
2017	European Indoor Championships	Belgrade, Serbia	4th	Pentathlon	4631 pts
2017	World Championships	London, United Kingdom	9th	Heptathlon	6356 pts
2018	World Indoor Championships	Birmingham, United Kingdom	6th	Pentathlon	4559 pts
2018	European Championships	Berlin, Germany	7th	Heptathlon	6367 pts
2019	European Indoor Championships	Glasgow, United Kingdom	7th	Pentathlon	4608 pts
2021	European Indoor Championships	Toruń, Poland	3rd	Pentathlon	4644 pts
2021	Olympic Games	Tokyo, Japan	13th	Heptathlon	6295 pts
2022	World Championships	Eugene, United States	–	Heptathlon	DNF
2022	European Championships	Munich, Germany	5th	Heptathlon	6372 pts
2023	European Indoor Championships	Istanbul, Turkey	5th	Pentathlon	4493 pts
2023	World Championships	Budapest, Hungary	4th	Heptathlon	6479 pts
2024	European Championships	Rome, Italy	8th	Heptathlon	6218 pts
2024	Olympic Games	Paris, France	7th	Heptathlon	6386 pts
2025	World Indoor Championships	Nanjing, China	8th	Pentathlon	4414 pts
