= Nadine Broersen =

Dutch track and field athlete (born 1990)

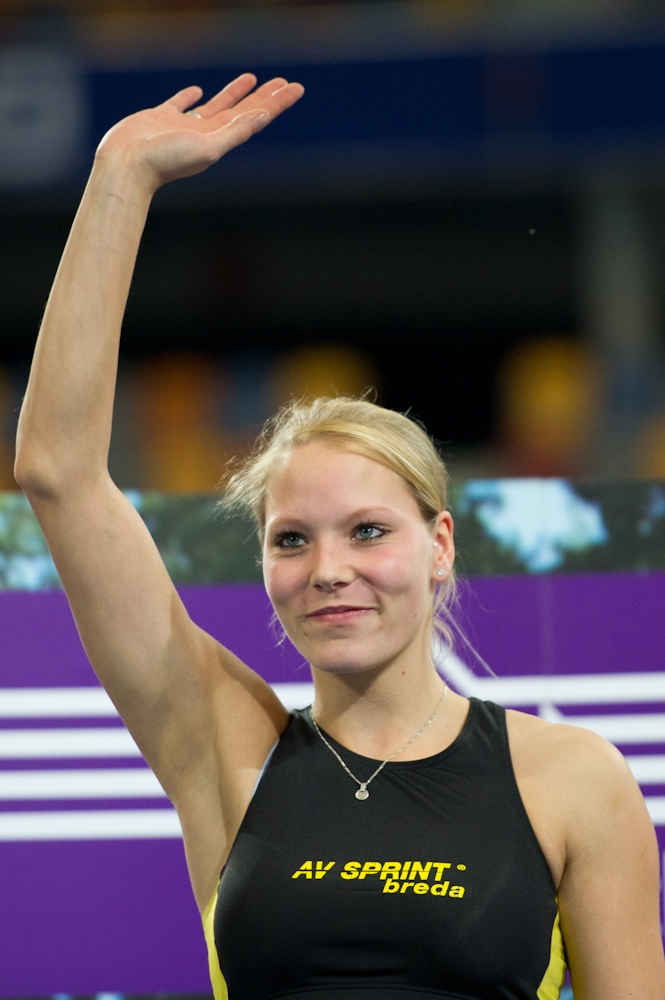
- Broersen after winning the 2011 Dutch indoor pentathlon title in February 2011

Personal information
- Born: April 29, 1990 (age 36) Hoorn, Netherlands
- Height: 1.71 m (5 ft 7 1/2 in)
- Weight: 63 kg (139 lb)

Sport
- Country: Netherland
- Sport: Athletics
- Event: Heptathlon
Medal record
Women's athletics
Representing Netherlands
World Indoor Championships
Gold medal – first place	2014 Sopot	Pentathlon
European Championships
Silver medal – second place	2014 Zurich	Heptathlon

Nadine Broersen (Dutch: [naːˈdinə ˈbruːrsə(n)]; born 29 April 1990) is a retired Dutch track and field athlete, specializing in the heptathlon and high jump. She was the 2014 World Indoor pentathlon champion. Broersen competes for the track and field club AV Sprint in Breda.

== Early career ==
Broersen is a member of the Dutch national combined events squad and trains at the Olympic Training centre in Papendal in the Netherlands since 2009. Because she was good in three essential events – 100 metres hurdles, high jump and the javelin throw – she was advised to specialize in the heptathlon, despite her fear for the 800 metres.

After decent results at the 2009 European Athletics Junior Championships, the 2011 European Athletics U23 Championships, and an 8th place at the prestigious Hypo-Meeting in Götzis (Austria) in 2012, Broersen was selected to compete at the 2012 Summer Olympics in London in the women's heptathlon event, where she finished 13th with a personal best score of 6319 points.

At the 2013 European Athletics Indoor Championships in Gothenburg (Sweden) she was on course for a medal in the pentathlon, but was disqualified for a lane violation in the final event, the 800m. However, she finished 2nd at the Hypo-Meeting behind Brianne Theisen from Canada. At the 2013 World Championships in Athletics in Moscow (Russia) she competed in the women's heptathlon, but did not start well, falling over the last hurdle in the 100 m hurdles. In the later disciplines however, she continued very strong and finished 10th, with her teammate Dafne Schippers finishing 3rd. Had she not fallen at the hurdles, she probably would have finished on the podium.

== 2014 World Indoor Champion ==
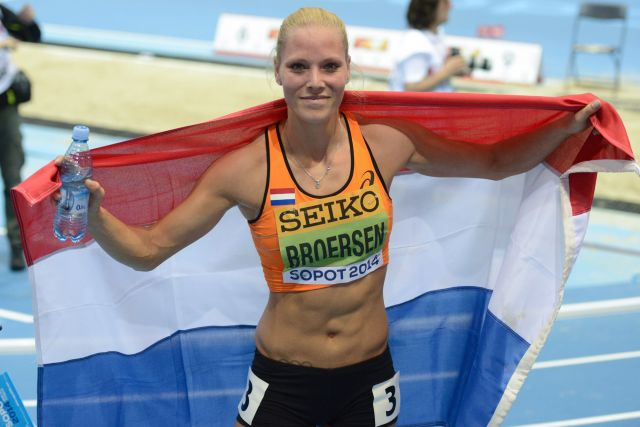
Nadine Broersen winning the 2014 IAAF World Indoor Championships in Sopot

On March 7, 2014, Broersen won gold at the World Indoor championships in Sopot (Poland) in the indoor pentathlon, improving the national record of Karin Ruckstuhl with a score of 4830 points. On the way to that result she also improved the national indoor record in the high jump, with a height of 1.93m. That year she finished 4th at Götzis, scoring 6536 points, which would have been a Dutch record, had Schippers not finished nine points ahead.

She set her personal best at 6539 points, winning the heptathlon in Toruń (Poland) in July 2014, just six points short of the national record set in March earlier that year by Schippers at Götzis. Later that year she won silver at the 2014 European Athletics Championships in Zurich (Switzerland) in the heptathlon behind France's Antoinette Nana Djimou, breaking the outdoor national record in the high jump with 1.94m. That year she won the 2014 IAAF Combined Events Challenge.

The next year, starting as one of the favourites at the 2015 European Athletics Indoor Championships, she had to give up due to an injured ankle incurred at the Dutch national indoor championships. Nevertheless, outdoor she finished 3rd in Gotzis and 4th at the 2015 World Championships in Athletics hepthatlon in Beijing (China). Before the final 800 m event, she had been in 2nd place overall after a good javelin throw.

In 2016, everything was focused on the 2016 Summer Olympics in Rio de Janeiro (Brazil). At the 2016 European Athletics Championships in Amsterdam in her home country, Broersen, who moved from ninth on the first day to fourth after winning the long jump and coming third in the javelin, but was unable to run the final 800 metres event due to an illness. Her teammate Anouk Vetter won the heptathlon event with a new national record of 6626 points. At the 2016 Summer Olympics she finished in a disappointing 13th place. Nevertheless, she made up the 2016 season by winning the heptathlon at the Décastar in Talence (France).

== Injuries and comeback ==
The 2017 season started with a 5th place at the 2017 European Athletics Indoor Championships pentathlon, but she had to abandon at the Hypo-Meeting in Götzis, sparing her ankle. At the World Championships heptathlon in London she had to abandon the event due to a hamstring injury, incurred at the long jump event. In Talence that year she failed to record a legal leap in the long jump and subsequently dropped out; the third incomplete heptathlon of the season.

In 2018 she could barely compete after she had torn the back cruciate ligament from her knee in November 2017 and a long rehabilitation followed. The 2019 season was the year of a comeback, despite an hamstring injury at national indoor pentathlon championship in February. At the Hypo-Meeting in Gotzis she finished 7th, and a month late she finished third at the Mehrkampf-Meeting Ratingen. At the 2019 World Athletics Championships in Doha she finished sixth.

== Competition record ==
Representing the Netherlands
Year	Competition	Venue	Position	Event	Notes
2009	European Junior Championships	Novi Sad, Serbia	5th	Heptathlon	5456 pts
2011	European U23 Championships	Ostrava, Czech Republic	9th	Heptathlon	5740 pts
2012	Hypo-Meeting	Götzis, Austria	8th	Heptathlon	6298 pts
2012	Olympic Games	London, United Kingdom	13th	Heptathlon	6319 pts
2013	European Indoor Championships	Gothenburg, Sweden	12th	Pentathlon	3707 pts
2013	Hypo-Meeting	Götzis, Austria	2nd	Heptathlon	6345 pts
2013	World Championships	Moscow, Russia	10th	Heptathlon	6224 pts
2014	World Indoor Championships	Sopot, Poland	1st	Pentathlon	4830 pts
2014	Hypo-Meeting	Götzis, Austria	4th	Heptathlon	6536 pts
2014	European Cup Combined Events Super League	Toruń, Poland	1st	Heptathlon	6539 pts (PB)
2014	European Championships	Zurich, Switzerland	2nd	Heptathlon	6498 pts
2015	European Indoor Championships	Prague, Czech Republic	–	Pentathlon	DNF
2015	Hypo-Meeting	Götzis, Austria	3rd	Heptathlon	6531 pts
2015	World Championships	Beijing, China	4th	Heptathlon	6491 pts
2016	European Championships	Amsterdam, Netherlands	−	Heptathlon	DNF
2016	Olympic Games	Rio de Janeiro, Brazil	13th	Heptathlon	6300 pts
2016	Décastar	Talence, France	1st	Heptathlon	6377 pts
2017	European Indoor Championships	Belgrade, Serbia	5th	Pentathlon	4582 pts
2017	World Championships	London, United Kingdom	–	Heptathlon	DNF
2019	Hypo-Meeting	Götzis, Austria	7th	Heptathlon	6297 pts
2019	Mehrkampf-Meeting	Ratingen, Germany	3rd	Heptathlon	6232 pts
2019	World Championships	Doha, Qatar	6th	Heptathlon	6392 pts
2021	European Indoor Championships	Toruń, Poland	10th	Pentathlon	3556 pts
2021	Olympic Games	Tokyo, Japan	–	Heptathlon	DNF

== Personal bests ==
Outdoor

Event	Result	Wind (m/s)	Venue	Date
100 m hurdles	13.39 s	0,0	Götzis, Austria	31 May 2014
High jump	1.94 m	—N/a	Zurich, Switzerland	14 August 2014
Shot put	15.14 m	—N/a	Leiden, Netherlands	17 June 2017
200 metres	24.57 s	+1,9	Götzis, Austria	31 May 2014
Long jump	6.39 m	0.0	Breda, Netherlands	28 June 2014
Javelin throw	54.97 m	—N/a	Götzis, Austria	27 May 2012
800 metres	2:11.11 m:s	—N/a	Götzis, Austria	1 June 2014
Heptathlon	6539 pts	—N/a	Toruń, Poland	7 July 2014

Indoor

Event	Result	Venue	Date
60 m hurdles	8.31 s	Prague, Czech Republic	6 March 2015
High jump	1.93 m	Sopot, Poland	7 March 2014
Shot put	14.93 m	Sheffield, United Kingdom	26 January 2014
Long jump	6.24 m	Apeldoorn, Netherlands	25 January 2015
800 metres	2:14.97 m:s	Sopot, Poland	7 March 2014
Pentathlon	4830 pts (NR)	Sopot, Poland	7 March 2014
