= Györgyi Zsivoczky-Farkas =

Hungarian heptathlete

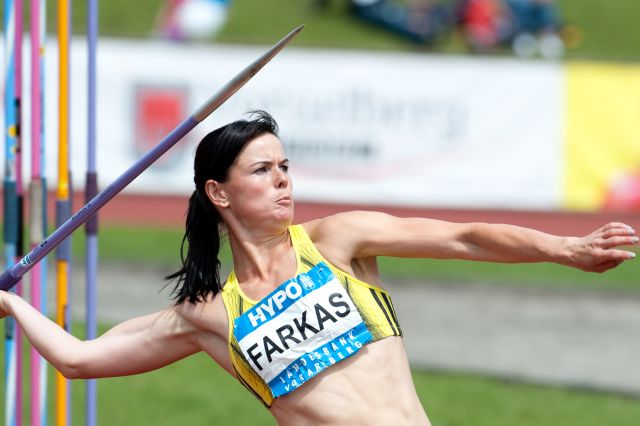
- Zsivoczky-Farkas in 2012

Personal information
- Born: Györgyi Farkas; 13 February 1985 (age 41)
- Height: 1.70 m (5 ft 7 in)
- Weight: 59 kg (130 lb)

Sport
- Country: Hungary
- Sport: Athletics
- Event: Heptathlon
Medal record
European Indoor Championships
Bronze medal – third place	2017 Belgrade	Pentathlon
- Updated on 4 August 2012

Györgyi Zsivoczky-Farkas (née Farkas; born 13 February 1985 in Budapest, Hungary) is a Hungarian heptathlete.

== Career ==
Her personal best score is 6389 achieved at Beijing on 23 August 2015.

She finished 28th in the 2008 Summer Olympics at Beijing with a score of 5760. Farkas finished 7th in the 10th IAAF World Junior Championships in Grosseto, Italy in July, 2004, with a score of 5550. At the 2012 Summer Olympics in London, she finished in 21st place, with a score of 6013.

She is married to another Hungarian combined events specialist, Attila Zsivoczky.

== Achievements ==
Year	Competition	Venue	Position	Event	Notes
Representing Hungary
2002	World Junior Championships	Kingston, Jamaica	10th	Heptathlon	5199 pts
2004	World Junior Championships	Grosseto, Italy	7th	Heptathlon	5550 pts
2005	European U23 Championships	Erfurt, Germany	16th	Heptathlon	5280 pts
2008	Olympic Games	Beijing, PR China	28th	Heptathlon	5760 pts
2009	Hypo-Meeting	Götzis, Austria	—	Heptathlon	DNF
2012	European Championships	Helsinki, Finland	14th	Heptathlon	5874 pts
2014	European Championships	Zürich, Switzerland	10th	Heptathlon	6151 pts
2015	European Indoor Championships	Prague, Czech Republic	6th	Pentathlon	4564 pts
2015	World Championships	Beijing, China	6th	Heptathlon	6389 pts
2016	World Indoor Championships	Portland, United States	5th	Pentathlon	4656 pts
2016	Olympic Games	Rio de Janeiro, Brazil	8th	Heptathlon	6442 pts
2017	European Indoor Championships	Belgrade, Serbia	3rd	Pentathlon	4723 pts
2017	World Championships	London, United Kingdom	17th	Heptathlon	6050 pts
2018	European Championships	Berlin, Germany	–	Heptathlon	DNF
