= Valérie Reggel =

Swiss heptathlete (born 1987)

Personal information
- Born: 3 January 1987 (age 38)

Sport
- Sport: Track and field
- Event: Heptathlon

Valérie Reggel (born 3 January 1987) is a Swiss athlete who specialises in the heptathlon. She competed in the heptathlon event at the 2015 World Championships in Athletics in Beijing, China.

Her personal bests in the combined events are 6,091 points in the heptathlon (Zürich 2014) and 3,925 points in the pentathlon (Magglingen 2007).

== Competition record ==
Year	Competition	Venue	Position	Event	Notes
Representing Switzerland
2006	World Junior Championships	Beijing, China	14th	Heptathlon	5244 pts
2014	European Championships	Zürich, Switzerland	12th	Heptathlon	6091 pts
2015	World Championships	Beijing, China	–	Heptathlon	DNF

== Personal bests ==
Outdoor
- 100 metres – 12.41 (+1.5 m/s) (Bern 2005)
- 200 metres – 24.30 (+2.0 m/s) (Götzis 2014)
- 400 metres – 55.99 (Langenthal 2013)
- 800 metres – 2:12.68 (Zürich 2014)
- 100 metres hurdles – 13.69 (Zug 2015)
- 400 metres hurdles – 58.89 (Luzern 2013)
- High jump – 1.70 (Zürich 2014)
- Long jump – 6.14 (-0.3 m/s) (Zürich 2014)
- Triple jump – 11.97 (-0.9 m/s) (Basel 2013)
- Shot put – 14.06 (Götzis 2015)
- Javelin throw – 44.76 (Götzis 2015)
- Heptathlon – 6091 (Zürich 2014)
Indoor
- 200 metres – 25.47 (Magglingen 2006)
- Pentathlon – 3925 (Magglingen 2007)
- 800 metres – 2:30.43 (St. Gallen 2010)
- 60 metres hurdles – 8.60 (Magglingen 2014)
- High jump – 1.63 (St. Gallen 2010)
- Long jump – 5.85 (Magglingen 2006)
- Triple jump – 12.15 (St. Gallen 2008)
- Shot put – 13.19 (Dornbirn 2014)
