= Anastasiya Mokhnyuk =

Ukrainian athlete (born 1991)

Personal information
- Nationality: Ukrainian
- Born: 1 January 1991 (age 35) Nova Kakhovka, Kherson Oblast, Ukraine
- Height: 1.75 m (5 ft 9 in)
- Weight: 71 kg (157 lb)

Sport
- Country: Ukraine
- Sport: Track and field
- Event: Heptathlon

Anastasiya Mokhnyuk (Ukrainian: Анастасія Мохнюк, born 1 January 1991) is a Ukrainian athlete who specialises in the heptathlon. She competed in the heptathlon event at the 2015 World Championships in Athletics in Beijing, China. She won the silver medal in the pentathlon at the 2016 IAAF World Indoor Championships.

On 14 April 2016 she tested positive for meldonium.
