= Ida Marcussen =

Norwegian heptathlete (born 1987)

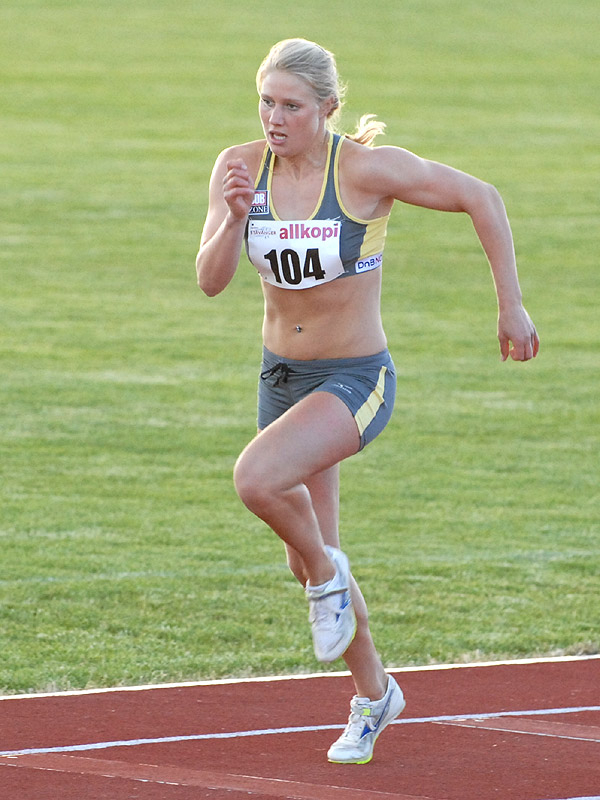
- Ida Marcussen during the 2007 Stavanger Games.

Personal information
- Born: 1 November 1987 (age 38)
- Height: 1.73 m (5 ft 8 in)
- Weight: 67 kg (148 lb)

Sport
- Country: Norway
- Sport: Athletics
- Event: Heptathlon
- Updated on 4 August 2012

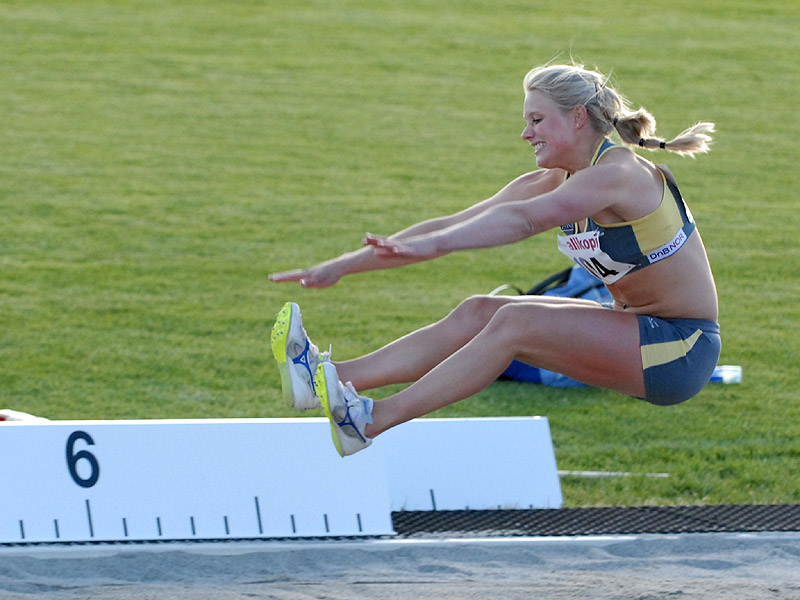
Ida Marcussen during the 2007 Stavanger Games.

Ida Marcussen (born 1 November 1987 in Kristiansand) is a retired Norwegian heptathlete. She represented IK Våg, having changed clubs from Kristiansands IF in 2006.

As a junior athlete she finished sixth at the 2005 European Junior Championships and won a silver medal at the 2006 World Junior Championships in Beijing. Her score of 6020 points from Beijing was only 65 points away from being a new Norwegian record.

In 2007 she entered her first senior championships at the 2007 World Championships in Osaka. After day one she was situated near the bottom of the results list; however, a strong performance during the second day saw her climb to eleventh place. She scored 6226 points, demolishing the Norwegian record in the event.

In 2008 she opened the season by setting a Norwegian indoor record in the pentathlon, with 4214 points. She competed at the international combined event meets in Götzis and Ratingen, setting new personal bests in the shot put, javelin and 800 metres. In August she entered the 2008 Olympic Games in Beijing. She started well, managing new personal best marks in the first two events, the 100 metres hurdles and the high jump. However, the rest of the competition was sub-par. In the end, she finished in twenty-first place after a decent 800 metres.

Her trainer was Lukas Udelhoven.

== Personal bests ==
- 200 metres - 24.57 s (Fana 2006)
- 800 metres - 2:09.74 min (Ratingen 2013)
- 100 metres hurdles - 13.96 s (Daegu 2011)
- High jump - 1.75 m (Font Romeu 2010)
- Long jump - 6.47 m (Osaka 2007)
- Shot put - 13.96 m (Götzis 2008)
- Javelin throw - 52.95 m (Götzis 2008)
- Heptathlon - 6226 pts (Osaka 2007) - Norwegian record.
- Pentathlon - 4316 pts (Gothenburg 2012)
