= Sri Lanka at the World Athletics Championships =

- WA code: SRI
- National federation: Sri Lanka Athletics
- Medals Ranked 0th: Gold 0 Silver 1 Bronze 1 Total 2

World Athletics Championships appearances (overview)
- 1983; 1987–1991; 1993; 1995; 1997; 1999; 2001; 2003; 2005; 2007; 2009; 2011; 2013; 2015; 2017; 2019; 2022; 2023; 2025

Sri Lanka has participated in the World Athletics Championships since 1983. Their first-ever medal was a silver and was won by Susanthika Jayasinghe at the 1997 World Championships in Women's 200 metres. She also won the bronze medal at the 2007 World Championships in Osaka.

== Medalists ==
Medal	Name	Year	Event
Silver	Susanthika Jayasinghe	1997 Athens	Women's 200 metres
Bronze	Susanthika Jayasinghe	2007 Osaka	Women's 200 metres

=== By event ===
Event	Gold	Silver	Bronze	Total
200 metres	0	1	1	2
Totals (1 entries)	0	1	1	2

=== By gender ===
Gender	Gold	Silver	Bronze	Total
Women	0	1	1	2
Men	0	0	0	0

== See also ==
- Sri Lanka at the Olympics
- Sri Lanka at the Paralympics
