= 2014 European Athletics Championships – Women's marathon =

Women's marathon at the European Athletics Championships

The women's marathon at the 2014 European Athletics Championships took place in Zürich on 16 August.

== Medalists ==
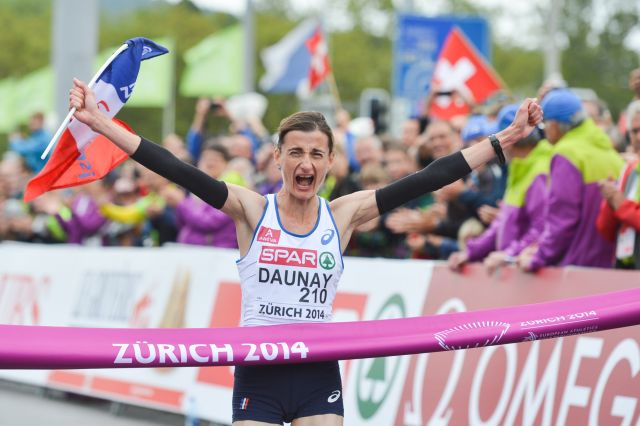
Winner Christelle Daunay

Gold	Christelle Daunay; France
Silver	Valeria Straneo; Italy
Bronze	Jessica Augusto; Portugal

== Records ==
Standing records prior to the 2014 European Athletics Championships
World record	Paula Radcliffe (GBR)	2:15:25	London, Great Britain	13 April 2003
European record	Paula Radcliffe (GBR)	2:15:25	London, Great Britain	13 April 2003
Championship record	Maria Guida (ITA)	2:26:05	Munich, Germany	10 August 2002
World Leading	Edna Ngeringwony Kiplagat (KEN)	2:20:21	London, Great Britain	13 April 2014
European Leading	Mariya Konovalova (RUS)	2:23:43	Nagoya, Japan	9 March 2014
Broken records during the 2014 European Athletics Championships
Championship record	Christelle Daunay (FRA)	2:25:14	Zürich, Switzerland	16 August 2014

== Schedule ==
Date	Time	Round
16 August 2014	09:00	Final

All times are local times (UTC+2)

== Results ==
Rank	Name	Nationality	Time	Note
1st place, gold medalist(s)	Christelle Daunay	France	2:25:14	CR
2nd place, silver medalist(s)	Valeria Straneo	Italy	2:25:27	
3rd place, bronze medalist(s)	Jessica Augusto	Portugal	2:25:41	
4	Lisa Christina Nemec	Croatia	2:28:36	
5	Elvan Abeylegesse	Turkey	2:29:46	
6	Anna Incerti	Italy	2:29:58	
7	Rasa Drazdauskaitė	Lithuania	2:30:32	
8	Jessica Draskau-Petersson	Denmark	2:30:53	PB
9	Maja Neuenschwander	Switzerland	2:31:08	
10	Fionnuala Britton	Ireland	2:31:46	
11	Natalya Puchkova	Russia	2:32:22	
12	Nadia Ejjafini	Italy	2:32:34	
13	Andrea Deelstra	Netherlands	2:32:39	PB
14	Emma Quaglia	Italy	2:32:45	SB
15	Filomena Costa	Portugal	2:32:50	
16	Deborah Toniolo	Italy	2:33:02	
17	Albina Mayorova	Russia	2:33:45	
18	Maryna Damantsevich	Belarus	2:33:57	
19	Miranda Boonstra	Netherlands	2:34:29	SB
20	Marisa Barros	Portugal	2:34:35	
21	Remalda Kergyte	Lithuania	2:35:13	PB
22	Mona Stockhecke	Germany	2:35:44	
23	Gulnara Vygovskaya	Russia	2:35:56	
24	Nicola Spirig	Switzerland	2:37:12	PB
25	Tetyana Vernyhor	Ukraine	2:38:01	
26	Patricia Morceli Buehler	Switzerland	2:38:41	SB
27	Zivile Balciunaite	Lithuania	2:39:53	
28	Katharina Heinig	Germany	2:40:11	
29	Liina Luik	Estonia	2:41:48	
30	Annelie Johansson	Sweden	2:42:04	PB
31	Nilay Esen	Turkey	2:42:05	
32	Frida Lunden	Sweden	2:42:18	PB
33	Martina Straehl	Switzerland	2:42:21	
34	Charlotte Karlsson	Sweden	2:42:29	PB
35	Nadezhda Leontyeva	Russia	2:42:41	
36	Sarah Mulligan	Ireland	2:42:43	
37	Stefanie Bouma	Netherlands	2:42:47	
38	Lena Eliasson	Sweden	2:43:12	
39	Ursula Spielmann-Jeitziner	Switzerland	2:43:20	
40	Rosaria Console	Italy	2:43:40	
41	Barbara Sanchez	Ireland	2:43:59	
42	Hanna Lindholm	Sweden	2:44:05	PB
43	Leila Luik	Estonia	2:45:59	
44	Magali Di Marco	Switzerland	2:46:53	
45	Martha Komu	France	2:47:34	
46	Lily Luik	Estonia	2:48:49	PB
47	Corinne Herbreteau-Cante	France	3:02:49	
DQ	Bahar Dogan	Turkey	~~2:47:11~~	
-	Alessandra Aguilar	Spain	DNF	
-	Sabrina Mockenhaupt	Germany	DNF	
-	Doroteia Peixoto	Portugal	DNF	
-	Evelin Talts	Estonia	DNF	
-	Ruth Van Der Meijden	Netherlands	DNF	

- CR - Championship Record; PB - Personal Best; SB - Season Best; DNF - Did Not Finish.

== Marathon Cup ==
The Women's Marathon doubled as the 2014 European Marathon Cup. Each country may enter up to six athletes and the results are determined by aggregating the times of the team's three best runners.

Rank	Country	Time
1st place, gold medalist(s)	Italy	7:27:59
2nd place, silver medalist(s)	Portugal	7:33:06
3rd place, bronze medalist(s)	Russia	7:42:03
4	Lithuania	7:45:38
5	Switzerland	7:47:01
6	Netherlands	7:49:55
7	Ireland	7:58:28
8	Sweden	8:06:51
9	France	8:15:37
10	Estonia	8:16:36
DQ	Turkey	~~7:59:02~~
