= Lidingöloppet =

Annual cross country running competition held in Lidingö, Sweden

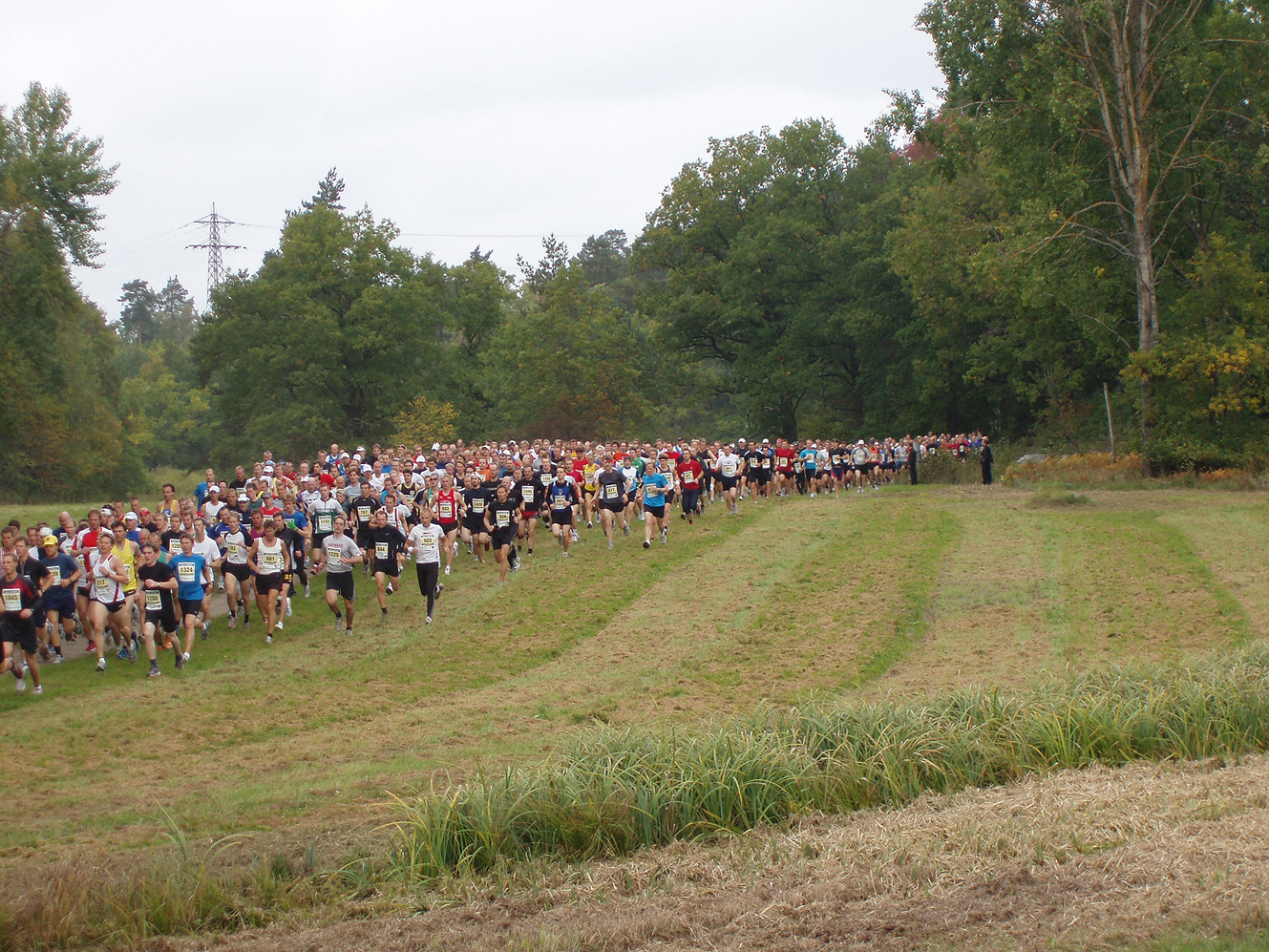
- Lidingöloppet, Saturday September 27, 2008. Starting group 1A, B och C, 30 km men/women, some minutes after the start 12:30 pm from Koltorps gärde.
- Date: September
- Location: Lidingö, Sweden
- Event type: Cross country running
- Distance: Long-distance
- Primary sponsor: TCS
- Established: 1965
- Course records: Men's: 1:33:33 (1998) (Kenya) Isaac Chemobo; Women's: 1:51:36 (2024) (Sweden) Carolina Wikström
- Website: Lidingöloppet
- Participants: 8,355 finishers (2022); 5,328 finishers (2021); 12,389 (2019)

Lidingöloppet is an annual cross country running competition held in Lidingö, Sweden. The 30 km run has about 15,000 participants per year and the shorter races several thousands, making it the largest cross-country event in the world. It is held the last weekend of September each year.

The initiative to arrange Lidingöloppet came from Karl Axel Karlberg and Sven Gärderud but the original idea to have a large competition for the average jogger comparable with Vasaloppet for cross country skiers, came from the sports magazine journalist Sven Lindhagen. In the first competition 1965, the number of participants was 644. The number of competitors grew rapidly as well as professional runners and has during the 2010s stabilized around 40,000 participants. In the 2022 competition the number of participants was 23,265. It is a tradition that long distance runners studying at Bosön sports training and education center participate at Lidingö. Tata Consultancy Services, a major IT company from India, is currently the primary sponsor of this event.

== Winners ==
Course records with green background.

=== Men 30 km ===
Year	Winner	Nation	Time (h:m:s)
1965	Berndt Ekström	Sweden	1:52:21
1966	Tim Johnston	United Kingdom	1:45:26
1967	Karl-Åke Asp	Sweden	1:50:44
1968	Rolf Hesselwall	Sweden	1:46:26
1969	Christopher Wade	Sweden	1:41:58
1970	Ingvald Midelf	Sweden	1:45:00
1971	Tapio Kantanen	Finland	1:41:45
1972	Reino Paukkonen	Finland	1:40:51
1973	Reino Paukkonen	Finland	1:38:21
1974	Rolf Hesselvall	Sweden	1:42:00
1975	Jukka Toivola	Finland	1:40:10
1976	Max Holmnäs	Sweden	1:42:54
1977	Jouni Kortelainen	Finland	1:42:18
1978	Lars Enkvist	Sweden	1:41:03
1979	Öivind Dahl	Norway	1:38:05
1980	Knut Kvalheim	Norway	1:37:51
1981	John Graham	United Kingdom	1:40:56
1982	Jarl Gaute Aase	Norway	1:38:23
1983	Öivind Dahl	Norway	1:39:34
1984	Knut Kvalheim	Norway	1:38:43
1985	Jarl Gaute Aase	Norway	1:38:25
1986	Suleiman Nyambui	Tanzania	1:36:38
1987	Tommy Ekblom	Finland	1:38:17
1988	Tommy Ekblom	Finland	1:37:26
1989	Douglas Wakiihuri	Kenya	1:36:10
1990	Simon Naali	Tanzania	1:37:45
1991	Boniface Merande	Kenya	1:38:41
1992	Benson Masya	Kenya	1:37:12
1993	Josphat Ndeti	Kenya	1:37:29
1994	Benson Masya	Kenya	1:37:02
1995	Paul Evans	United Kingdom	1:36:01
1996	William Musyoki	Kenya	1:35:14
1997	Isaac Chemobo	Kenya	1:35:16
1998	Isaac Chemobo	Kenya	1:33:33
1999	Barnabas Kosgei	Kenya	1:36:01
2000	Barnabas Kosgei	Kenya	1:35:51
2001	Francis Kirwa	Kenya	1:39:49
2002	Augustus Mbusya	Kenya	1:36:51
2003	Mustafa Mohamed	Sweden	1:37:29
2004	Mustafa Mohamed	Sweden	1:40:47
2005	Silas Sang	Kenya	1:37:39
2006	Johnstone Chebii	Kenya	1:39:18
2007	Joseph Kimisi	Kenya	1:40:44
2008	Mustafa Mohamed	Sweden	1:37:10
2009	Japhet Kipkorir	Kenya	1:39:42
2010	Japhet Kipkorir	Kenya	1:36:30
2011	Lewis Korir	Kenya	1:34:54
2012	Lewis Korir	Kenya	1:35:26
2013	Lewis Korir	Kenya	1:35:23
2014	Lewis Korir	Kenya	1:37:13
2015	William Morwabe	Kenya	1:37:37
2016	Japhet Kipkorir	Kenya	1:37:52
2017	Napoleon Solomon	Sweden	1:38:47
2018	Napoleon Solomon	Sweden	1:37:42
2019	Robel Fsiha	Sweden	1:37:55
2020	Linus Hultegård	Sweden	1:43:46
2021	Samuel Russom	Eritrea	1:36:56
2022	Samuel Tsegay	Sweden	1:38:00
2023	Diego Estrada	United States	1:39:11
2024	Ebba Tulu Chala	Sweden	1:38:19
2025	William Morwabe	Kenya	1:37:15
2026	Ebba Tulu Chala	Sweden	1:38:50

=== Women 30 km ===
Year	Winner	Nation	Time (h:m:s)
1996	Malin Ewerlöf-Krepp	Sweden	2:05:20
1997	Heléne Willix	Sweden	1:56:55
1998	Maria Andersson	Sweden	2:05:53
1999	Jennie Åkerberg	Sweden	2:03:15
2000	Annelie Södergårds	Sweden	2:10:26
2001	Malin Ewerlöf-Krepp	Sweden	2:02:04
2002	Lena Gavelin	Sweden	1:53:13
2003	Helena Olofsson	Sweden	1:58:26
2004	Lena Gavelin	Sweden	1:54:43
2005	Lena Gavelin	Sweden	1:58:39
2006	Lena Gavelin	Sweden	2:00:00
2007	Isabellah Andersson	Sweden	1:57:34
2008	Anna Rahm	Sweden	1:53:20
2009	Malin Ewerlöf-Krepp	Sweden	1:57:46
2010	Ulrika Johansson	Sweden	2:00:40
2011	Charlotte Karlsson	Sweden	2:02:55
2012	Sandra Eriksson	Finland	1:59:54
2013	Therese Olin	Sweden	1:57:50
2014	Annelie Johansson	Sweden	1:57:28
2015	Annelie Johansson	Sweden	1:58:15
2016	Maria Larsson	Sweden	1:56:54
2017	Maria Larsson	Sweden	1:55:19
2018	Sylvia Medugu	Kenya	1:53:00
2019	Sylvia Medugu	Kenya	1:51:57
2020	Hanna Kumlin	Sweden	2:04:43
2021	Sylvia Medugu	Kenya	1:55:03
2022	Sylvia Medugu	Kenya	1:54:57
2023	Carolina Johnson	Sweden	1:54:25
2024	Carolina Wikström	Sweden	1:51:36
2025	Carolina Johnson	Sweden	1:49:19
2026	Evelina Henriksson	Sweden	1:53:28

- Note: Although women were allowed to enter the 30 km before 1996, they had no competition class thus no winner was selected.

=== Women 10 km ===
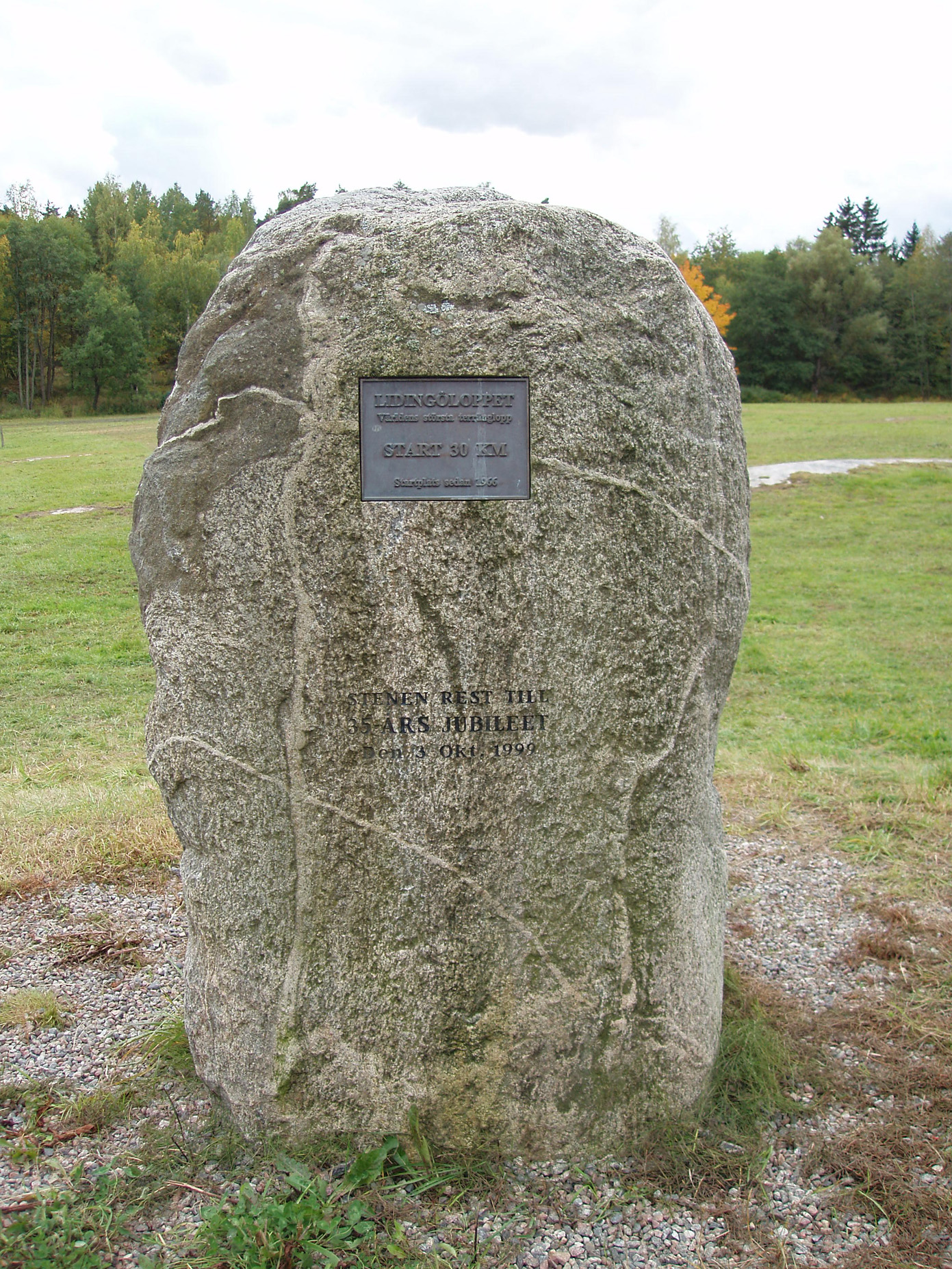
Stone commemorating the birth of Lidingöloppet 1965 at Koltorps gärde. The stone was erected in 1999. Coordinates GPS, WGS 84: 59°21′36.60″N 18°10′36.01″E.

Year	Winner	Nation	Time (m:s)
2002	Janet Ongera	Kenya	35:06
2003	Flomena Chepchirchir	Kenya	35:32
2004	Nancy Kiprop	Kenya	34:24
2005	Susanne Wigene	Norway	33:27
2006	Ida Nilsson	Sweden	34:22
2007	Tigist Tufa	Ethiopia	34:44
2008	Pauline Njeri	Kenya	34:16
2009	Benita Willis	Australia	34:19
2010	Isabellah Andersson	Sweden	35:03
2011	Isabellah Andersson	Sweden	35:26
2012	Perine Nengampi	Kenya	35:11
2013	Perine Nengampi	Kenya	34:13
2014	Ayantu Abera	Ethiopia	35:18
2015	Webelam Ayele	Ethiopia	34:29
2016	Sylvia Mmboga Medugu	Kenya	34:50
2017	Sylvia Mmboga Medugu	Kenya	33:54
2018	Alemtsehay Asefa	Ethiopia	35:06
2019	Elisabet Clausén	Sweden	37:13
2021	Sofia Öberg	Sweden	38:21
2022	Madeleine Larsson	Sweden	39:14

=== Women 15 km ===
Year	Name	Nation	Time
1967	Barbro Tano	Sweden	1:12:01
1968	Viola Ylipaa	Sweden	1:05:34
1969	Siv Larsson	Sweden	1:03:34
1970	Siv Larsson	Sweden	1:02:31
1971	Eva Olsson	Sweden	1:02:13
1972	Irja Paukkonen-Pettinen	Finland	1:01:02
1973	Inger Knutsson	Sweden	57:19
1974	Irja Paukkonen-Pettinen	Finland	1:01:17
1975	Inger Knutsson	Sweden	58:02
1976	Grete Waitz	Norway	54:39
1977	Grete Waitz	Norway	53:05
1978	Grete Waitz	Norway	51:52
1979	Grete Waitz	Norway	53:05
1980	Grete Waitz	Norway	51:03
1981	Grete Waitz	Norway	53:20
1982	Grete Waitz	Norway	52:08
1983	Grete Waitz	Norway	52:07
1984	Grete Waitz	Norway	53:52
1985	Grete Waitz	Norway	53:20
1986	Grete Waitz	Norway	53:12
1987	Ingrid Kristiansen	Norway	51:58
1988	Grete Waitz	Norway	54:39
1989	Angela Tooby	Wales	54:49
1990	Angela Tooby	Wales	54:45
1991	Yan-fang Wang	China	54:17
1992	Tegla Loroupe	Kenya	53:22
1993	Annemari Sandell	Finland	53:30
1994	Tegla Loroupe	Kenya	53:23
1995	Annemari Sandell	Sweden	52:34
1996	Sara Wedlund	Sweden	51:15
1997	Annemari Sandell	Finland	52:19
1998	Annemari Sandell	Finland	53:52
1999	Annemari Sandell	Finland	54:35
2000	Stine Larsen	Norway	54:47
2001	Gunhild Haugen	Norway	56:08
2023	Lovisa Kissa	Uganda	55:54
2024	Sara Schou Kristensen	Denmark	54:18
2025	Kristine Lande Dommersnes	Norway	53:04
2026	Francine Niyomukunzi	Burundi	51:25
