= Luyckx =

Luyckx (pronounced [lœyk(s)]) is a Dutch patronymic surname based on an archaic spelling of the given name Luuk/Luc, short forms of Lucas. The name has a myriad of spellings, all pronounced the same. While in Belgium Luyckx is by far the most common (3,433 people in 2008), in the Netherlands the forms Luijkx, Luijks, Luijk, Luik and Luijckx are more prevalent. For some families the name may be toponymic instead, referring to an origin in Luik, the Dutch name of Liège. This is generally the case for forms like Van Luijk, Van Luik and de Luyck. People with these surnames include:

- Albert Luykx (1919–1978), Belgian Nazi collaborator who fled to Ireland
- Alec Luyckx (born 1995), Belgian football player
- Bets Borm-Luijkx (1918–2015), Dutch politician
- Boniface Luykx (1915–2004), Belgian Norbertine priest and monastery founder
- Carstian Luyckx (1623–c.1675), Flemish still life painter and draughtsman
- Clifford Luyk (born 1941), Dutch-American born Spanish basketball player
- Fernand Luickx (1932–2007), Belgian painter
- Frans Luycx (1604–1668), Flemish portrait painter
- Kees Luijckx (born 1986), Dutch football defender
- Luc Luycx (born 1958), Belgian designer of the common side of the euro coins
- Marc Luyckx Ghisi (born 1942), Belgian philosopher and essayist
- Maxime Luycx (born 1982), Belgian field hockey player
- Patrick van Luijk (born 1984), Dutch sprinter
- Peter Luykx (born 1964), Belgian politician
- Teun Luijkx (born 1986), Dutch actor

== See also ==
- Luiken, Dutch surname of the same origin
- Luik, Estonian surname
