= Sri Lanka at the 2025 World Athletics Championships =

- Flag of Sri Lanka
- WA code: SRI

in Tokyo, Japan 13 September 2025 – 21 September 2025
- Competitors: 3 (2 men and 1 woman)
- Medals: Gold 0 Silver 0 Bronze 0 Total 0

World Athletics Championships appearances (overview)
- 1983; 1987–1991; 1993; 1995; 1997; 1999; 2001; 2003; 2005; 2007; 2009; 2011; 2013; 2015; 2017; 2019; 2022; 2023; 2025

Sri Lanka competed at the 2025 World Athletics Championships in Tokyo, Japan, from 13 to 21 September 2025.

== Results ==
Sri Lanka entered 2 athletes: 1 male and 1 female athlete.

Key

- Q = Qualified for the next round
- q = Qualified for the next round as a fastest loser or, in field events, by position without achieving the qualifying target
- NR = National record
- PB = Personal best
- SB = Season best
- N/A = Round not applicable for the event

=== Men ===
Field events

Athlete	Event	Qualification		Final	
Athlete	Event	Distance	Position	Distance	Position
Rumesh Tharanga Pathirage	Javelin throw	82.80	12 q	84.38	7
Sumeda Ranasinghe	Javelin throw	81.86	15	Did not advance	

=== Women ===
Track and road events

Athlete	Event	Heat		Semifinal		Final	
Athlete	Event	Result	Rank	Result	Rank	Result	Rank
Nadeesha Ramanayake	400 metres	53.63	8	Did not advance			
