= Luiken =

Luiken is a Dutch patronymic surname based on the archaic spelling Luik of the given name Luuk, a short form of Lucas, or on the equally archai name Lui (from Ludo or Ludolph). Among variants are Luijken, Luikens and Luyken. People with this surname include:

- Jan Luyken (1649–1712), Dutch poet, illustrator and engraver
- Johannes Gerardus Luyken (1742–1818), Dutch politician for the Batavian Republic
- Leda Luss Luyken (born 1952), Greek-American conceptual artist
- Nicole Luiken (born 1971), Canadian science fiction author
- Otto Luyken (1884–1953), German gardener
- Stefanie Luiken (born 1985), Dutch backstroke swimmer

== See also ==
- Luyckx, Dutch surname of the same origin
- Luik, Estonian surname
