= Sweden at the 2015 World Championships in Athletics =

- WA code: SWE
- National federation: Svenska Friidrottsförbundet
- Website: www.friidrott.se

in Beijing, China
- Competitors: 24
- Medals: Gold 0 Silver 0 Bronze 0 Total 0

World Championships in Athletics appearances (overview)
- 1976; 1980; 1983; 1987; 1991; 1993; 1995; 1997; 1999; 2001; 2003; 2005; 2007; 2009; 2011; 2013; 2015; 2017; 2019; 2022; 2023; 2025

Sweden competed at the 2015 World Championships in Athletics in Beijing, China, from 22–30 August 2015.

== Results ==
=== Men ===
Track and road events

Athlete	Event	Heat		Semifinal		Final	
Athlete	Event	Result	Rank	Result	Rank	Result	Rank
Andreas Almgren	800 metres	1:48.06	25	did not advance			
David Nilsson	Marathon	—N/a				2:31:24	36
Perseus Karlström	20 km race walk	—N/a				did not finish	
Anatole Ibáñez	20 km race walk	—N/a				1:26:34	40
Anatole Ibáñez	50 km race walk	—N/a				did not finish	
Anders Hansson	50 km race walk	—N/a				did not finish	

Field events

Athlete	Event	Qualification		Final	
Athlete	Event	Distance	Position	Distance	Position
Michel Tornéus	Long jump	NM		did not advance	
Axel Härstedt	Discus throw	60.52	23	did not advance	
Daniel Ståhl	Discus throw	62.66	9 q	64.73 SB	5
Kim Amb	Javelin throw	81.63	10 q	78.51	11

=== Women ===
Track and road events

Athlete	Event	Heat		Semifinal		Final	
Athlete	Event	Result	Rank	Result	Rank	Result	Rank
Abeba Aregawi	1500 metres	4:10.77	24 Q	4:15.90	14 Q	4:12.16	6
Elise Malmberg	400 metres hurdles	55.97	17 Q	56.58	23	did not advance	
Klara Bodinson	3000 metres steeplechase	9:50.13	30	—N/a		did not advance	
Charlotta Fougberg	3000 metres steeplechase	9:50.79	31	—N/a		did not advance	
Annelie Johansson	Marathon	—N/a				2:43:42	33
Charlotte Karlsson	Marathon	—N/a				2:47:40	44
Louise Wiker	Marathon	—N/a				2:49:57	48

Field events

Athlete	Event	Qualification		Final	
Athlete	Event	Distance	Position	Distance	Position
Erica Jarder	Long jump	6.70 SB	10 q	6.48	12
Khaddi Sagnia	Long jump	6.71	8 q	6.78 SB	7
Erika Kinsey	High jump	1.89	18	did not advance	
Sofie Skoog	High jump	1.89	14	did not advance	
Angelica Bengtsson	Pole vault	4.55	1 q	4.70 NR	4
Malin Dahlström	Pole vault	4.15	24	did not advance	
Michaela Meijer	Pole vault	4.55 PB	6 q	NM	
Tracey Andersson	Hammer throw	65.99	26	did not advance	
