= Luik =

Family name

== Places ==
- Liège, Belgian city known in the Dutch language as Luik

== People ==
Luik is an Estonian surname meaning "swan". It may refer to:

- Aivi Luik (born 1985), Australian football player
- Hans H. Luik (born 1961), Estonian journalist, theatre critic and media entrepreneur
- Helmuth Luik (1928–2009), Estonian chess player
- Jaan Luik (born 1953), Estonian sculptor
- John Luik (born 1950), American philosopher
- Jüri Luik (born 1966), Estonian politician and diplomat
- Karl Luik (1883–1948), Estonian politician
- Lauri Luik (born 1982), Estonian politician
- Liina Luik (born 1985), Estonian long-distance runner, one of triplet
- Lily Luik (born 1985), Estonian long-distance runner, one of triplet
- Leila Luik (born 1985), Estonian long-distance runner, one of triplet
- Margus Luik (born 1980), Estonian racewalker
- Sulev Luik (1954–1997), Estonian actor
- Terje Luik (born 1941), Estonian actress
- Viivi Luik (born 1946), Estonian author
- Vilma Luik (born 1959), Estonian actress

== See also ==
- Luick (surname)
