= Rajasekara =

Rajasekara is a surname. Notable people with the surname include:

- Niluka Geethani Rajasekara (born 1982), Sri Lankan long-distance runner
- M. Rajasekara Murthy (1922–2010), Indian politician
