= James Price (chemist) =

English chemist & alchemist (1757–1783)

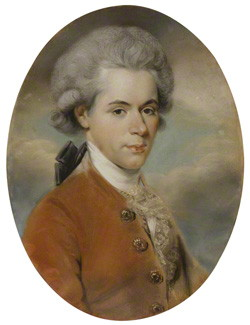
- Born: James Higginbotham; 1757; London, England
- Died: 31 July 1783 (aged 25–26); Guildford, England
- Education: Oxford University (M.A., 1777; M.D., 1782)
- Occupations: Chemist, alchemist

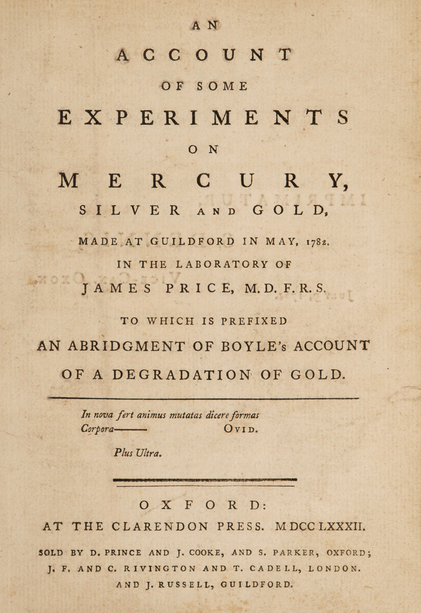
Title page of Price's pamphlet An Account of Some Experiments on Mercury, Silver and Gold, Made at Guildford in May, 1782, published in Oxford in 1782 and describing his experiments

James Price (1757 – 31 July 1783), born James Higginbotham, was an English chemist and alchemist who claimed to be able to turn mercury into silver or gold. When challenged to perform the conversion a second time in front of credible witnesses, he instead killed himself by drinking prussic acid (hydrogen cyanide).

== Early life ==
Born in London in 1757, his original surname was Higginbotham, but he changed it to Price following the wishes of a relative who had died and left him a legacy. He attended Oxford University and, although no records of his early education or his research at Oxford exist, had a successful career there. He became a Master of Arts in 1777 and the university made him a Doctor of Medicine in 1782, particularly for his work in the field of chemistry. In 1781, at the age of 24, he became a member of the Royal Society.

== Work on transmutation ==
In the following year, he began working on the transmutation of base metals into precious metals and since 6 May 1782, after revealing his findings to a few of his friends, he hosted a series of public experiments at his laboratory in Guildford. He claimed that he could produce precious metals by mixing borax, nitre, and a red or white powder of his own devising (which he called the powder of production) with fifty times its own weight in mercury and stirring the mixture in a crucible with an iron rod. Mixing in the red powder allegedly produced gold; the white powder, silver. He performed seven of the public demonstrations, the final one being on 25 May 1782, which were attended by peers, clergymen, lawyers, and chemists. Some of the gold that Price claimed was produced during the experiments was presented to King George III.

== Challenged by other Fellows ==
The Fellows of the Royal Society were less convinced, however, and asked him to repeat the experiments in the presence of some of the members of the society, which Price was reluctant to do. He claimed that his powders were exhausted and preparation of new samples would cost him time and money and be damaging to his health. He also protested that the cost of preparing the gold or silver by this method was not economical, as it cost £17 to make an ounce of gold, which was only valued at £4. The Royal Society insisted on the repetition of the experiments and reminded Price that, as a member, he was calling the honour of the society into question. Price rebuked them, claiming that his reputation and position in society should prevent any hint of suspicion from being cast upon the veracity of his claims, but he was eventually forced to submit.

== Events leading to suicide ==
In January 1783, Price returned to his laboratory in Guildford, ostensibly to start production of the miraculous powders. In fact, he set about the distillation of laurel water (which contained hydrogen cyanide, commonly known as prussic acid). He wrote his will at the same time, but it was another six months before he returned to London to invite members of the Royal Society to witness the experiment in his laboratory in Guildford.

Despite the claimed successes of his initial demonstrations and the furor they had caused, only three members turned up in Guildford on the appointed day. Although clearly disappointed by the poor turnout, Price welcomed the three men and then, stepping to one side, ended his life by drinking the flask of laurel water he had prepared. The three men immediately noticed a change in his appearance, but before they could do anything, Price had died of cyanide poisoning.
