= Luick =

Luick is a German surname. Notable people with the surname include:

- John Luick (1840–1938), American businessman
- Karl Luick (1865–1935), Austrian Anglicist, rector of the Wien University
- Larry Luick (born 1958), American politician
- William Henry Luick, American farmer and horticulturist, namesake of the historic William Henry Luick Farmhouse

== See also ==
- Luik (surname)
