= Jessica Draskau-Petersson =

Danish long-distance runner

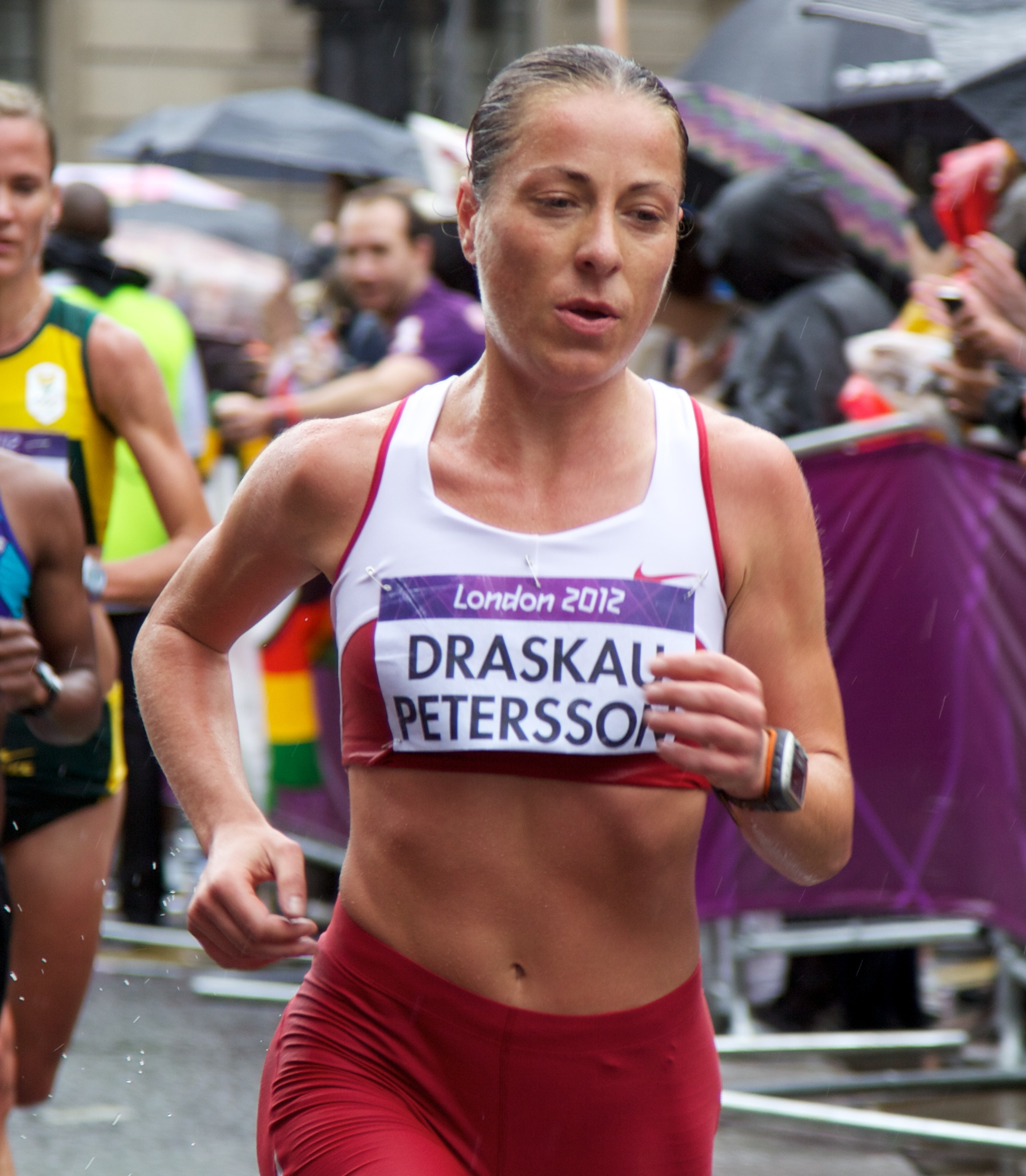

Personal information
- Born: 8 September 1977 (age 48)
- Height: 1.7 m (5 ft 7 in)
- Weight: 63 kg (139 lb)

Sport
- Country: Denmark
- Sport: Athletics
- Event: Marathon

Jessica Draskau Petersson (born 8 September 1977) is a Danish long-distance runner . Her fastest marathon time was set at the 2015 Bank of America Chicago marathon, where she ran a time of 2:30:07. She competed in the marathon at the 2012 Summer Olympics and 2016 Olympic Marathon in Rio She finished eighth in the marathon at the 2014 European Athletics Championships.

Petersson has an LLB from the University of East Anglia and a master's degree on traditional knowledge and international law from the University of Waikato in New Zealand.
