= Mare Dibaba =

Ethiopian long-distance runner

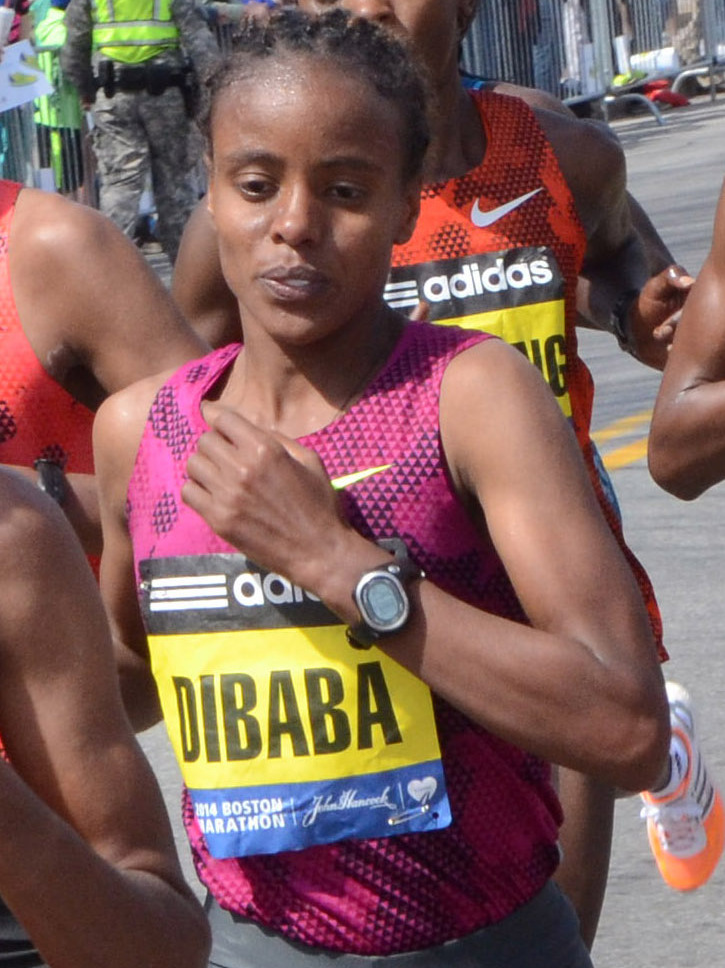
- Dibaba in the 2014 Boston Marathon

Personal information
- Born: 20 October 1989 (age 36) Oromia Region, Ethiopia
- Height: 1.51 m (4 ft 11 1/2 in)
- Weight: 38 kg (84 lb)

Sport
- Country: Ethiopia
- Sport: Athletics
- Event: Marathon
Medal record
Olympic Games
Bronze medal – third place	2016 Rio de Janeiro	Marathon
World Championships
Gold medal – first place	2015 Beijing	Marathon
All-Africa Games
Gold medal – first place	2011 Maputo	Half marathon

Mare Dibaba Hurrsa (born 20 October 1989) is an Ethiopian long-distance runner. She won the 2015 World Championships in Athletics in Beijing. Dibaba is not related to track Olympic champion, world record holder and compatriot Tirunesh Dibaba.

== Biography ==
Her first high-profile outing came at the Ethiopian 20 km championships in 2007 and she took sixth place, running for Oromia Police. She made her international debut at the 2008 Udine Half Marathon and the eighteen-year-old ran a personal best of 1:10:32 hours for second place behind Anikó Kálovics. Her next run came in November at the New Delhi Half Marathon, where she finished in eighth place but slightly improved her time to 1:10:28.

Mare briefly transferred to compete for Azerbaijan in 2009, running under the name Mare Ibrahimova, but after she was revealed to be overage for the European Athletics Junior Championships she returned to compete for her country of birth. Among her competitions representing Azerbaijan was a sixth-place finish at the 2009 Delhi Half Marathon, at which she much improved her time for the distance by crossing the line in 1:08:45 (an Azerbaijani record).

Having reverted to her Ethiopian citizenship, she further established herself at the Ras Al Khaimah Half Marathon, coming in second place behind Elvan Abeylegesse. She had led the race at the 20 km mark and her time of 1:03:47 for that point was the fastest recorded by any woman in 2010, while her half marathon time of 1:07:13 was the second fastest of the year. She made her marathon debut in March with a quick 2:25:38 time for third at the Rome Marathon. She won the Rabat Half Marathon in April and made her first appearances in the United States in August, winning the Crim 10-Miler and News and Sentinel Half Marathon. She was one of the leading names at the Frankfurt Marathon but, in spite of a personal best of 2:25:27, she managed only fifth place in the quick-paced race.

Mare managed third place at the Ras Al Khaimah Half Marathon in February 2011. Although she was the pre-race favourite at the Los Angeles Marathon in March, she was defeated by both Bezunesh Deba and Amy Hastings and came third with a comparatively slow time of 2:30:25 hours. A month later she won the Yangzhou Jianzhen International Half Marathon by a margin of one minute. She was the runner-up at the Bogota Half Marathon in August. Although she was not selected for the world championships team that year, she was chosen to represent her country at the 2011 All-Africa Games, where she won the half marathon gold medal in a Games record time of 1:10:47 hours. She improved her marathon best to 2:23:25 hours at the Toronto Waterfront Marathon in October, finishing as runner-up behind Koren Yal. A sixth-place finish followed at the Delhi Half Marathon.

At the 2012 Dubai Marathon she placed third, with a personal best time of 2:19:52 hours, making her the second fastest Ethiopian woman after the winner Aselefech Mergia. As a result, she was selected for the marathon team at the 2012 London Olympics, but she was slower in the Olympic marathon, running a time of 2:28:48 hours and finishing 23rd. Her last performance of the year was a runner-up finish at the Philadelphia Half Marathon.

In 2014, she won the Bank of America Chicago Marathon with a time of 2:25:37 hours. The win was announced 30 January 2015, as Rita Jeptoo was suspended retroactively for an EPO positive drug test to 25 September 2014, which would have made her ineligible for the Chicago Marathon that she finished first.

In 2015, she won the marathon at the World Championships in Beijing.

She was the heavy favourite for the Olympic marathon title but ended up winning bronze behind Jemima Sumgong and Eunice Kirwa, both Kenyan-born athletes.
