= Sairi Maeda =

Japanese long-distance runner

Personal information
- Native name: 前田 彩里
- Nationality: Japanese
- Born: 7 November 1991 (age 34)

Sport
- Country: Japan
- Sport: Track and field
- Event: Marathon

Sairi Maeda (前田 彩里, Maeda Sairi); (born 7 November 1991) is a Japanese long-distance runner. She competed in the marathon event at the 2015 World Championships in Athletics in Beijing, China.
