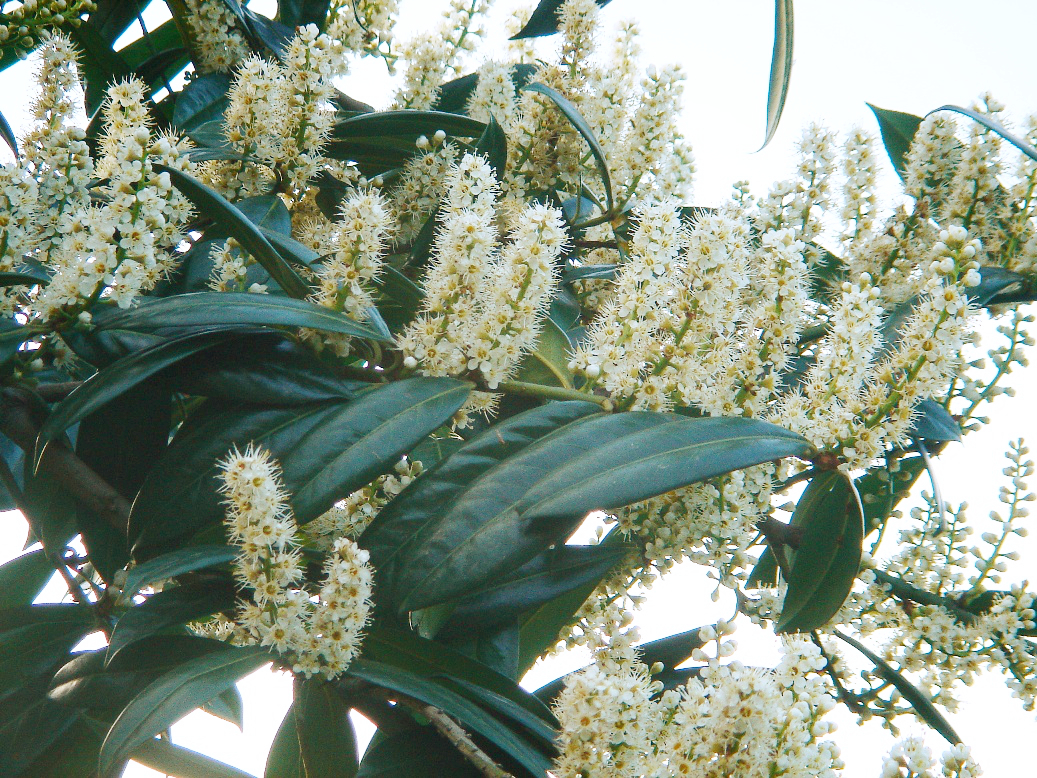
- Foliage and flowers

Conservation status
- Least Concern (IUCN 3.1)

Scientific classification
- Kingdom: Plantae
- Clade: Tracheophytes
- Clade: Angiosperms
- Clade: Eudicots
- Clade: Rosids
- Order: Rosales
- Family: Rosaceae
- Genus: Prunus
- Species: P. laurocerasus

Binomial name
- Prunus laurocerasus L.

Synonyms
- List: Cerasus laurocerasus (L.) Dum.Cours.; Cerasus laurocerasus (L.) Loisel.; Laurocerasus officinalis M.Roem.; Laurocerasus otinii Carrière; Laurocerasus vulgaris Carrière; Padus laurocerasus (L.) Mill.; Prunus grandifolia Salisb.

= Prunus laurocerasus =

Species of plant

Prunus laurocerasus, also known as cherry laurel, common laurel and sometimes English laurel in North America, is an evergreen species of cherry (Prunus), native to regions bordering the Black Sea in southwestern Asia and southeastern Europe, from Albania and Bulgaria east through Turkey to the Caucasus Mountains and northern Iran.

The common names of P. laurocerasus refer to the similarity of foliage and appearance to bay laurel (Laurus nobilis, the true laurel, in the family Lauraceae), and like the bay laurel, Prunus laurocerasus was used for making laurel wreaths, but the two plants are not closely related. It is not to be confused with its American relative Prunus caroliniana, which is also called cherry laurel.

== Description ==
Prunus laurocerasus is an evergreen shrub or small to medium-sized tree, growing to 5 to 15 metres (16 to 49 ft) tall, rarely to 18 metres (59 ft), with a trunk up to 60 cm broad. The leaves are dark green, leathery, shiny, (5–)10–25(–30) cm long and 4–10 cm broad, with a finely serrated margin. The leaves can have the scent of almonds when crushed. The flower buds appear in early spring and open in early summer in erect 7–15 cm racemes of 30–40 flowers, each flower 1 cm across, with five creamy-white petals and numerous yellowish stamens with a sweet smell. The fruit is a small cherry 1–2 cm broad, turning black when ripe in early autumn.

== Cultivation ==
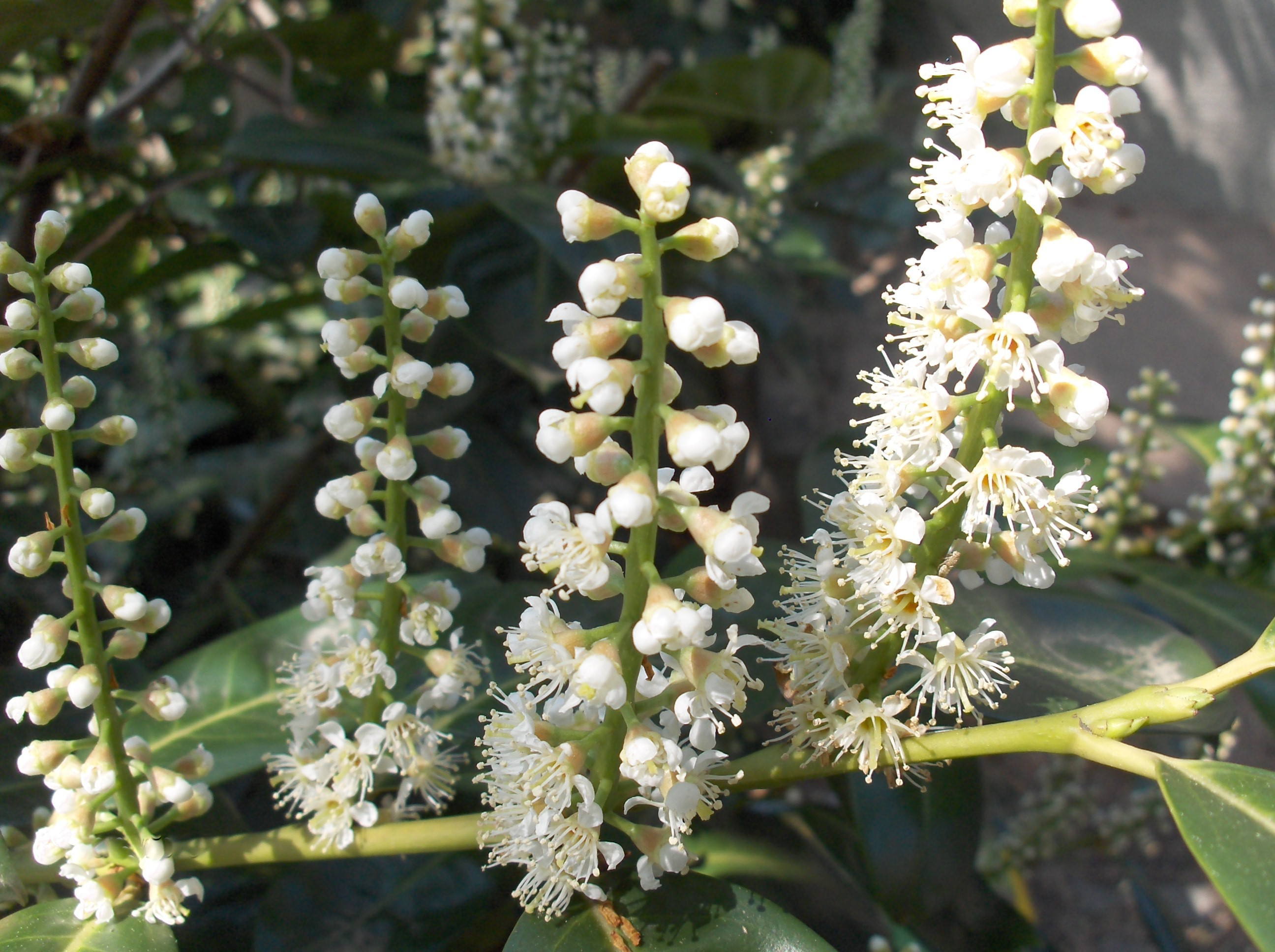
Flowers - Prunus laurocerasus

Prunus laurocerasus is a widely cultivated ornamental plant, used for planting in gardens and parks in temperate regions worldwide. It is often used for hedges, as a screening plant, and as a massed landscape plant. Most cultivars are tough shrubs that can cope with difficult growing conditions, including shaded and dry conditions, and which respond well to pruning.

=== Cultivars ===
Over 40 cultivars have been selected, including

- 'Aureovariegata', variegated, leaves with a yellow margin
- 'Magnifolia', vigorous, with great leaves up to 30-cm wide and 11-cm broad
- 'Otto Luyken' (named after Otto Luyken), half-dwarf, with small leaves 10-cm wide and 2–3-cm broad
- 'Schipkaensis'
- 'Zabeliana', selected for winter cold tolerance

The cultivar 'Otto Luyken' has gained the Royal Horticultural Society's Award of Garden Merit.

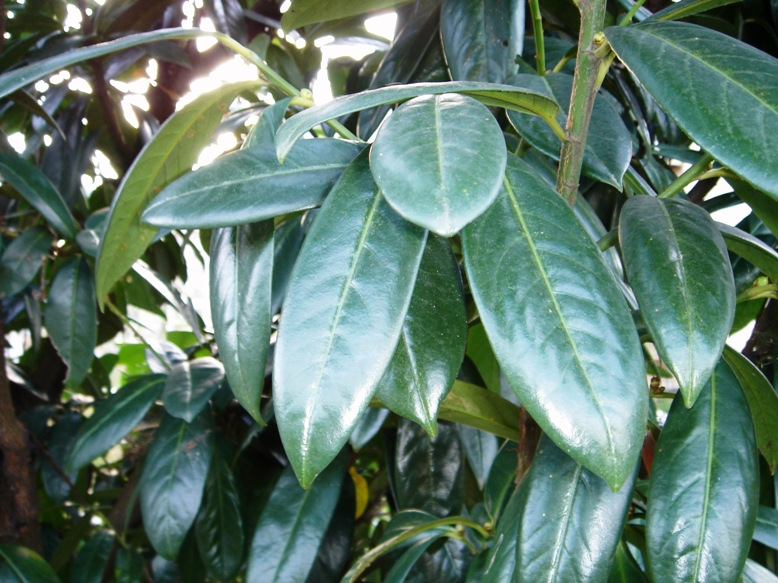
Leaves - Prunus laurocerasus

== Invasive species ==
It has become naturalised widely. In some regions (such as the United Kingdom, the Isle of Man and the Pacific Northwest of North America), this species can be an invasive plant. Its rapid growth, coupled with its evergreen habit and its tolerance of drought and shade, often allow it to out-compete and kill off native plant species. It is spread by birds, through the seeds in their droppings.

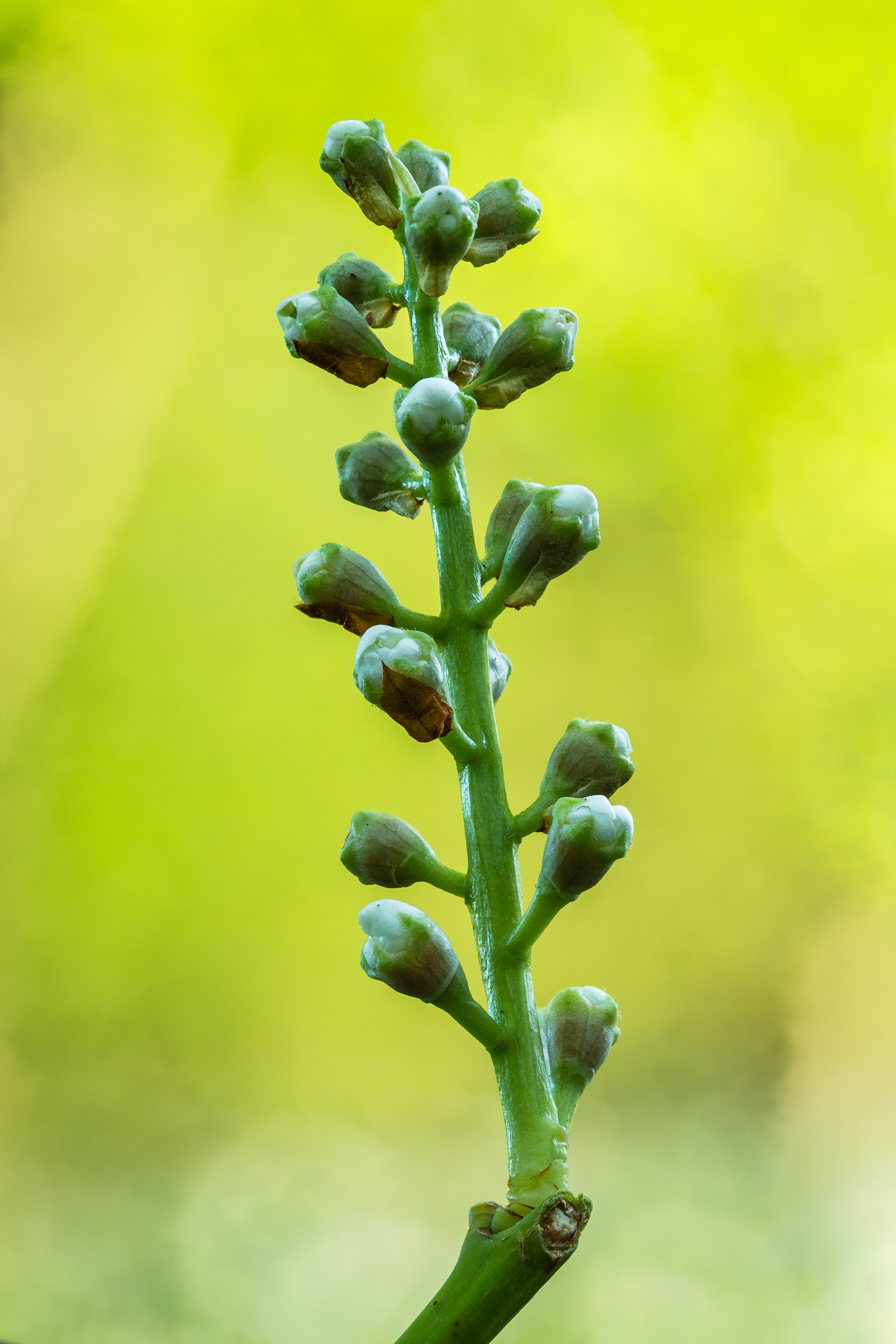
Developing flower buds – Prunus laurocerasus

== Habitat ==
The species is found in woods and in shrubbery places as an escape in Northern Ireland and commonly planted in parks and gardens.

The species that are mainly found in Turkey's Eastern Black Sea Region (mainly Trabzon and Giresun) are categorized as endemic plants.

== Other uses ==
The foliage is also used for cut greenery in floristry.

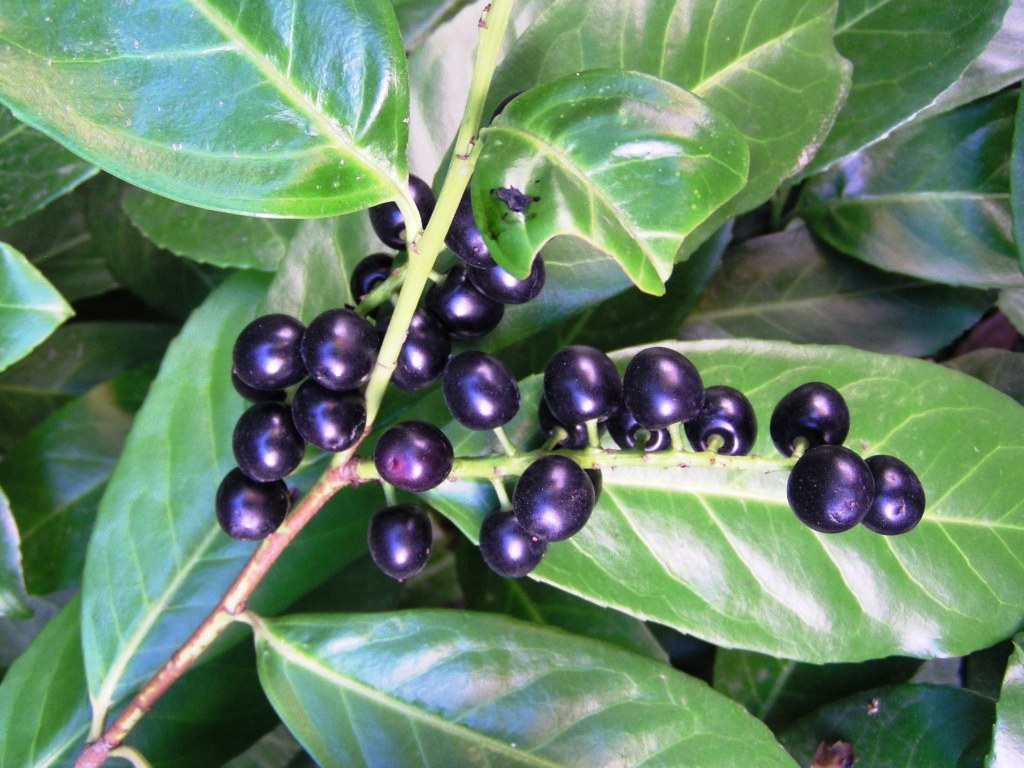
Prunus laurocerasus fruits.

The fruits are astringent but edible. They contain small amounts of hydrogen cyanide; any fruit tasting bitter (which indicates larger concentrations of hydrogen cyanide) should not be eaten. The seed inside the fruit (and the leaves) contain larger concentrations of hydrogen cyanide, and should never be eaten. The toxicity of the seed inside the fruit is similar to the cyanide toxicity of the seeds inside the common fruits apricot and peach.

== Toxicity ==
Leaves and seed may cause severe discomfort to humans if ingested. The seeds contained within the cherries are poisonous like the rest of the plant, containing cyanogenic glycosides and amygdalin. This chemical composition is what gives the smell of almonds when the leaves are crushed. Laurel water, a distillation made from the plant, contains prussic acid (hydrogen cyanide) and other compounds and is toxic.

== Wood ==
Cherry laurel wood contains a lot of water. It tends to gum up blades while cutting. It tends to split and distort while drying.

The freshly cut wood is creamy white and smells of almonds, It turns to orange and brown when dried.

Sections that are large enough in diameter may be used to turn bowls.

== Similar species ==
Prunus lusitanica, Portuguese laurel, is similar in appearance, but may be distinguished by its sharply toothed leaves and red petioles.
