= North Korea at the 2015 World Championships in Athletics =

- WA code: PRK

in Beijing
- Competitors: 3
- Medals: Gold 0 Silver 0 Bronze 0 Total 0

World Championships in Athletics appearances
- 1983; 1987–1997; 1999; 2001; 2003; 2005; 2007; 2009; 2011; 2013; 2015; 2017; 2019; 2022; 2023

North Korea competed at the 2015 World Championships in Athletics in Beijing, China, from 22–30 August 2015 in two events: men and women's marathon.

== Results ==
=== Men ===
Track and road events

Athlete	Event	Heat		Semifinal		Final	
Athlete	Event	Result	Rank	Result	Rank	Result	Rank
Pak Chol	Marathon	—				2:15:44 SB	11

=== Women ===
Track and road events

Athlete	Event	Heat		Semifinal		Final	
Athlete	Event	Result	Rank	Result	Rank	Result	Rank
Kim Hye-gyong	Marathon	—				DNF	
Kim Hye-song	Marathon	—				2:30:59	9
