= Inspire, Debate, Engage and Accelerate Action =

Inspire, Debate, Engage and Accelerate Action (IDEA), formerly known as European Political Strategy Centre (EPSC), is an advisory service of the European Commission reporting directly to the President of the European Commission and working under her authority. IDEA is composed of a professional staff of advisers, policy analysts and support staff in order to provide ideas and inspiration for the core priorities of the President; debate and engage around new evidence-based policy alternatives in the community of think tanks, research, and other institutions through active outreach; and accelerate the conversion of these ideas and engagements into concrete and bold action to help the EU Commission deliver to its citizens in a fast-changing context. The Centre has a head, currently Philippe Lamberts, who ranks as a Director-General designated by the President.

== History ==
=== Forward Studies Unit of the European Commission ===
The origins of what is today known as IDEA go back to 1989, when the Forward Studies Unit was established by the European Commission as a small 'think tank' staffed with EU officials reporting directly to President Jacques Delors.

The Unit's primary task was to monitor and evaluate European integration by studying long-term prospects and structural tendencies, basing itself particularly on a network of external contacts with research institutes specialised in long-term forecasting and planning.

==== Members of the Forward Studies Unit of the European Commission ====
- Marc Luyckx Ghisi
- Guy Spier
- Maria João Rodrigues

=== Group of Policy Advisers (GOPA) ===
In May 2000, Romano Prodi changed the Forward Studies Unit into the Group of Policy Advisers (GOPA) and entrusted it with four specific domains: economics, social affairs, foreign affairs, and dialogue with religions.

=== Bureau of European Policy Advisers (BEPA) ===
With the arrival of José Manuel Barroso as President of the European Commission in 2004, GOPA was restructured and rebranded as the Bureau of European Policy Advisers (BEPA).

=== European Political Strategy Centre (EPSC) ===
With the arrival of Jean-Claude Juncker as President of the European Commission in 2014, BEPA was restructured and rebranded as European Political Strategy Centre (EPSC).

== See also ==
- Codecision procedure
- Committee of Permanent Representatives (Coreper)
- European Research Advisory Board (EURAB)
