= 2015 World Championships in Athletics – Women's marathon =

Women's marathon at the 2015 World Championships
- Venue: Beijing National Stadium
- Dates: 30 August
- Competitors: 65 from 38 nations
- Winning time: 2:27:39

Medalists
gold medal	Mare Dibaba	Ethiopia
silver medal	Helah Kiprop	Kenya
bronze medal	Eunice Kirwa	Bahrain

The women's marathon at the 2015 World Championships in Athletics was held at the Beijing National Stadium on 30 August. The winning margin was one second which as of 2024 is the only time the women's marathon has been won by less than three seconds at these championships.

== Summary ==
Under overcast skies the race quickly formed two large packs of about 20 runners. For the next 25K, the lead pack remained about the same size with some runners bridging the gap in time for others to fall off the pace. Between 25K and 30K, the pack dropped to a dozen runners. Just after 31K, defending champion Edna Kiplagat accelerated. In the next 4K, the lead pack cut in half, the remaining athletes were three Kenyans, two Ethiopians and Eunice Kirwa wearing a Bahrain uniform, from Kenya. London Marathon champion Tigist Tufa was the first to fall back, then Kiplagat began to lose contact. But the four person pack remained tougher into the stadium. Four athletes to sprint it out on the track for three medals after running 26 miles. Mare Dibaba (no relation to the other famous Dibaba sisters) led the group toward the tunnel. As they started to speed up, Jemima Sumgong did not have another gear. Kirwa was perfectly positioned to strike but instead Helah Kiprop launched the attack from the back after looking like she was ready to drop off, long striding behind the diminutive Dibaba. 60 metres before the finish they were almost even, but Dibaba would not give that last few inches. Then Dibaba sped away to cross the line with almost 7 metres gap. The times had a second between first and second, a four-second gap amongst the medalists and a 7-second gap back to fourth place. On every count, the closest Marathon finish in World Championship history.

It was four Kenyan born athletes in places 2–5, Ethiopia and Japan placed three each in the top 14 places.

== Records ==
Prior to the competition, the records were as follows:

World record	Paula Radcliffe (GBR)	2:15:25	London, United Kingdom	13 April 2003
Championship record	Paula Radcliffe (GBR)	2:20:57	Helsinki, Finland	14 August 2005
World leading	Mare Dibaba (ETH)	2:19.52	Xiamen, China	3 January 2015
African record	Mary Jepkosgei Keitany (KEN)	2:18:37	London, United Kingdom	22 April 2012
Asian record	Mizuki Noguchi (JPN)	2:19:12	Berlin, Germany	25 September 2005
NACAC record	Deena Kastor (USA)	2:19:36	London, United Kingdom	23 April 2006
South American record	Inés Melchor (PER)	2:26:40	Berlin, Germany	28 September 2014
European record	Paula Radcliffe (GBR)	2:15:25	London, United Kingdom	13 April 2003
Oceanian record	Benita Willis (AUS)	2:22:36	Chicago, United States	22 October 2006

== Qualification standards ==
Time
2:44:00

== Schedule ==
Date	Time	Round
30 August 2015	07:30	Final

All times are local times (UTC+8)

== Results ==
The race was started at 07:30.

KEY:	NR	National record	PB	Personal best	SB	Seasonal best

Rank	Name	Nationality	Time	Notes
1st place, gold medalist(s)	Mare Dibaba	Ethiopia	2:27:35	
2nd place, silver medalist(s)	Helah Kiprop	Kenya	2:27:36	
3rd place, bronze medalist(s)	Eunice Kirwa	Bahrain	2:27:39	
4	Jemima Sumgong	Kenya	2:27:42	
5	Edna Kiplagat	Kenya	2:28:18	
6	Tigist Tufa	Ethiopia	2:29:12	
7	Mai Ito	Japan	2:29:48	
8	Tirfi Tsegaye	Ethiopia	2:30:54	
9	Kim Hye-song	North Korea	2:30:59	
10	Serena Burla	United States	2:31:06	SB
11	Rasa Drazdauskaitė	Lithuania	2:31:23	SB
12	Filomena Costa	Portugal	2:31:40	
13	Sairi Maeda	Japan	2:31:46	
14	Risa Shigetomo	Japan	2:32:37	
15	Alina Prokopeva	Russia	2:32:44	
16	Ding Changqin	China	2:33:04	
17	Alessandra Aguilar	Spain	2:33:42	
18	O. P. Jaisha	India	2:34:43	NR
19	Sudha Singh	India	2:35:35	PB
20	Visiline Jepkesho	Kenya	2:36:17	
21	Sinead Diver	Australia	2:36:38	SB
22	Katarína Berešová	Slovakia	2:37:24	
23	Sarah Klein	Australia	2:37:58	SB
24	Esther Erb	United States	2:38:15	SB
25	Lishan Dula	Bahrain	2:38:18	
26	Clara Canchanya	Peru	2:39:24	
27	Liina Luik	Estonia	2:39:42	PB
28	Wang Xueqin	China	2:41:42	
29	Anne-Mari Hyryläinen	Finland	2:41:59	
30	Kim Seongeun	South Korea	2:42:14	
31	Kateryna Karmanenko	Ukraine	2:43:12	SB
32	Yiu Kit Ching	Hong Kong	2:43:28	
33	Annelie Johansson	Sweden	2:43:42	
34	Nebiat Habtemariam	Eritrea	2:44:42	SB
35	Munkhzaya Bayartsogt	Mongolia	2:45:01	
36	Iuliia Andreeva	Kyrgyzstan	2:45:04	
37	He Yinli	China	2:45:05	
38	Lily Luik	Estonia	2:45:22	SB
39	Anita Kažemāka	Latvia	2:45:54	SB
40	Gulzhanat Zhanatbek	Kazakhstan	2:45:54	
41	Yeum Go-eun	South Korea	2:46:46	
42	Aster Tesfaye	Bahrain	2:46:54	
43	Sultan Haydar	Turkey	2:47:11	
44	Charlotte Karlsson	Sweden	2:47:40	
45	Hsu Yu-fang	Chinese Taipei	2:48:01	
46	Julia Degan	Australia	2:49:26	SB
47	Roselaine Benites	Brazil	2:49:28	
48	Louise Wiker	Sweden	2:49:57	
49	Niluka Geethani Rajasekara	Sri Lanka	2:50:40	
50	Mayada Al-Sayad	Palestine	2:53:39	
51	Dailín Belmonte	Cuba	2:56:18	SB
52	Hsieh Chien-ho	Chinese Taipei	2:58:25	
	Souad Aït Salem	Algeria	DNF	
	Hortensia Arzapalo	Peru	DNF	
	Michele Cristina das Chagas	Brazil	DNF	
	Barkahoum Drici	Algeria	DNF	
	Sitora Hamidova	Uzbekistan	DNF	
	Kim Hye-gyong	North Korea	DNF	
	Soumiya Labani	Morocco	DNF	
	Heather Lieberg	United States	DNF	
	Luvsanlkhündegiin Otgonbayar	Mongolia	DNF	
	Tanith Maxwell	South Africa	DNF	
	Beata Naigambo	Namibia	DNF	
	Irina Smolnikova	Kazakhstan	DNF	
	Paula Todoran	Romania	DNF	
	Lalita Babar	India	DNS	
	Olena Popova	Ukraine	DNS	
