= Reino Paukkonen =

Finnish long-distance runner

Personal information
- Nationality: Finnish
- Born: 20 September 1945 (age 80) Heinävesi, Finland

Sport
- Sport: Long-distance running
- Event: Marathon

Reino Paukkonen (born 20 September 1945) is a Finnish long-distance runner. He competed in the marathon at the 1972 Summer Olympics.
