= Sri Lanka at the 2019 World Athletics Championships =

Sri Lanka at the 2019 World Championships in Athletics
- WA code: SRI

in Doha, Qatar 27 September 2019 – 6 October 2019
- Competitors: 1 (1 woman) in 1 event
- Medals: Gold 0 Silver 0 Bronze 0 Total 0

World Championships in Athletics appearances
- 1983; 1987–1991; 1993; 1995; 1997; 1999; 2001; 2003; 2005; 2007; 2009; 2011; 2013; 2015; 2017; 2019; 2022; 2023; 2025

Sri Lanka competed at the 2019 World Championships in Athletics in Doha, Qatar, from 27 September to 6 October 2019. Hiruni Kesara Wijayaratne was the only athlete representing Sri Lanka, in the women's marathon event.

Hiruni Wijayaratne left the marathon race halfway at 22 km citing heat stroke and high temperature.

== Results ==
Key

- Q = Qualified for the next round
- q = Qualified for the next round as a fastest loser or, in field events, by position without achieving the qualifying target
- NR = National record
- PB = Personal best
- SB = Season best
- N/A = Round not applicable for the event

=== Women ===
Track and road events

Athlete	Event	Final	
Athlete	Event	Result	Rank
Hiruni Kesara Wijayaratne	marathon	DNF	DNF
