= Sri Lanka at the 2023 World Athletics Championships =

- Flag of Sri Lanka
- WA code: SRI

in Budapest, Hungary 19 August 2023 – 27 August 2023
- Competitors: 7 (6 men and 1 woman)
- Medals: Gold 0 Silver 0 Bronze 0 Total 0

World Athletics Championships appearances (overview)
- 1983; 1987–1991; 1993; 1995; 1997; 1999; 2001; 2003; 2005; 2007; 2009; 2011; 2013; 2015; 2017; 2019; 2022; 2023

Sri Lanka competed at the 2023 World Athletics Championships in Budapest, Hungary, from 19 to 27 August 2023.

== Results ==
Sri Lanka entered 7 athletes.

Key

- Q = Qualified for the next round
- q = Qualified for the next round as a fastest loser or, in field events, by position without achieving the qualifying target
- NR = National record
- PB = Personal best
- SB = Season best
- N/A = Round not applicable for the event

=== Men ===
Track and road events

| Athlete | Event | Heat | | Semifinal | | Final | |
| Athlete | Event | Result | Rank | Result | Rank | Result | Rank |
|---|---|---|---|---|---|---|---|
| Aruna Dharshana | 400 metres | 45.70 | 6 | Did not advance | | | |
| Aruna Dharshana; Kalinga Kumarage; Pabasara Niku; Rajitha Neranjan Rajakaruna | 4 × 400 metres relay | 3:03.25 | 8 | — | | Did not advance | |

=== Women ===
Field events

| Athlete | Event | Qualification | | Final | |
| Athlete | Event | Distance | Position | Distance | Position |
|---|---|---|---|---|---|
| Dilhani Lekamge | Javelin throw | 55.89 | 22 | Did not advance | |
