= Laurel water =

Solution of hydrogen cyanide

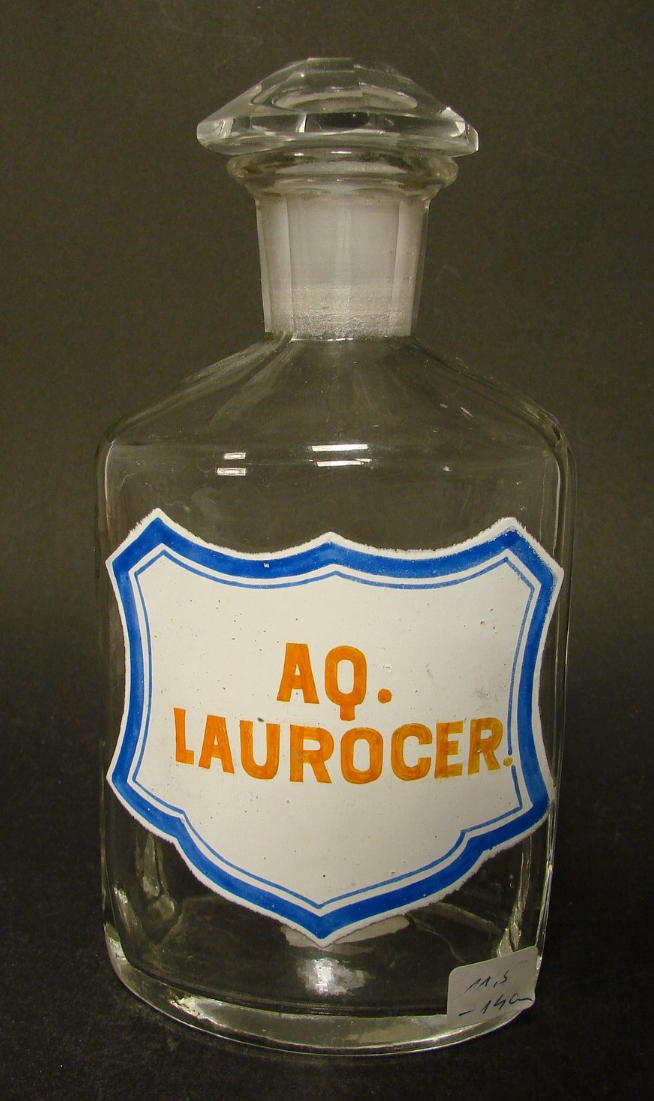
Pharmacy bottle from the early 20th century

Laurel water is distilled from the fresh leaves of the cherry laurel, and contains the poison prussic acid (hydrocyanic acid), along with other products carried over in the process.

== Pharmacological usage ==
Historically, the water (Latin aqua laurocerasi) was used for asthma, coughs, indigestion and dyspepsia, and as a sedative narcotic; however, since it is effectively a solution of hydrogen cyanide, of uncertain strength, it would be extremely dangerous to attempt medication with laurel water. The Roman emperor Nero is thought to have potentially used cherry laurel water to poison the wells of his enemies, based on extremely sparse evidence.
