= Otto Luyken =

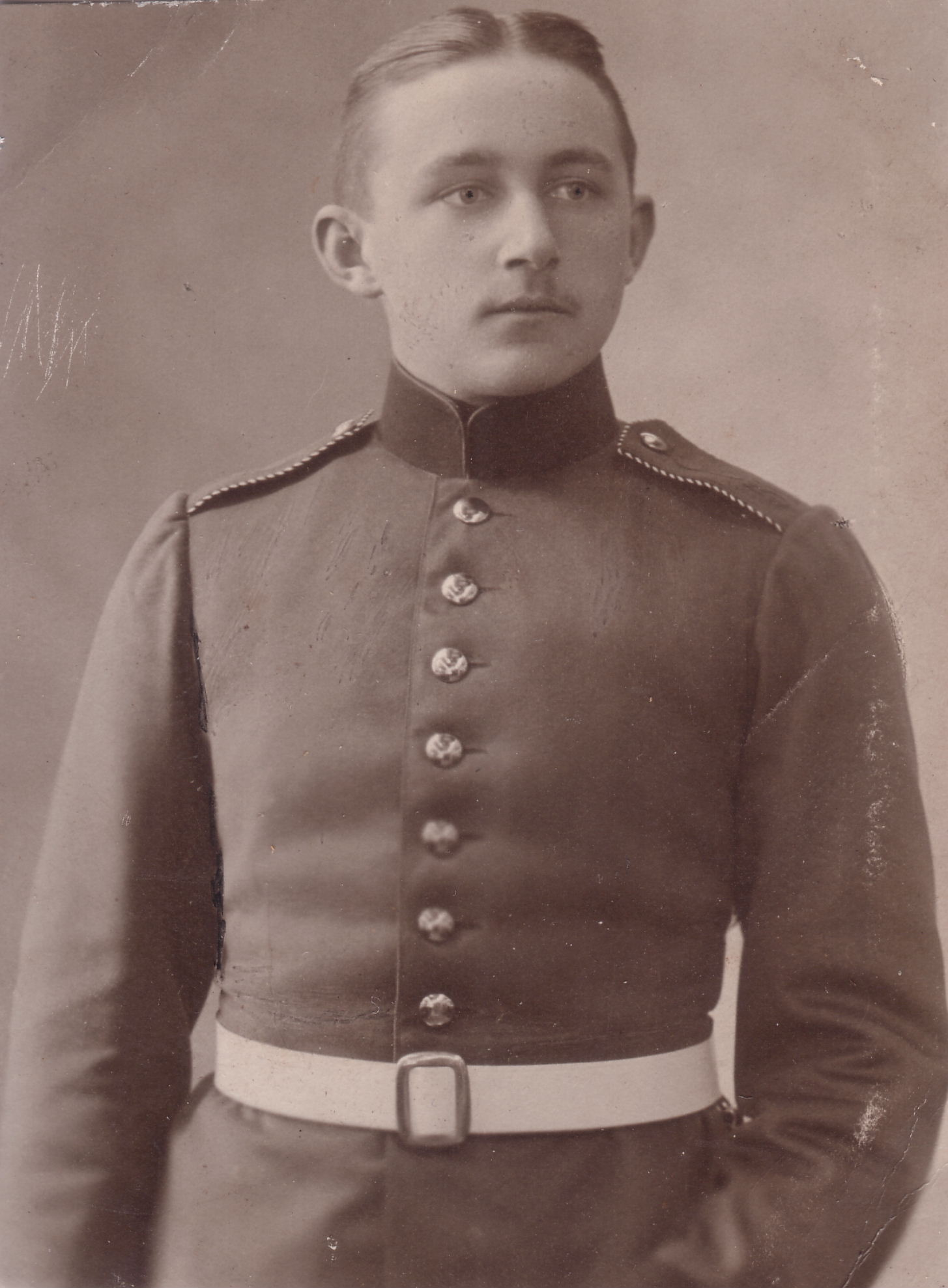
Otto Luyken in 1904 in Germany

Otto Luyken (4 November 1884 – 3 February 1953) was director of the "Hesse Tree Nurseries" (Baumschulen Hesse) in Weener, Germany. He bred the cherry laurel (Prunus laurocerasus) variety named after him.

== Life ==
Luyken was born in Siegen, Germany. His parents were Emil Luyken (1845-1906) and Johanna Hesse (1848-1934). He went to school in Siegen and then began an apprenticeship as gardener in Belgium and England. After participating in World War I he started working at the "Hesse Tree Nurseries" in Weener which were owned by his mother's parents, and later became the director. Under his management the establishment won a high prestige. During World War II he was drafted again to military service for a long time and came back sick. He suffered from a dilated lung, and died in Weener. After his death the tree nurseries could not be kept in family's ownership.

The "Baumschulen Hesse" were founded 1879 by Hermann A. Hesse (1852-1937). The "Otto Luyken" cherry laurel was selected by the nursery in 1940 and introduced to trade in 1953 (Otto's death year).

== Picture gallery ==
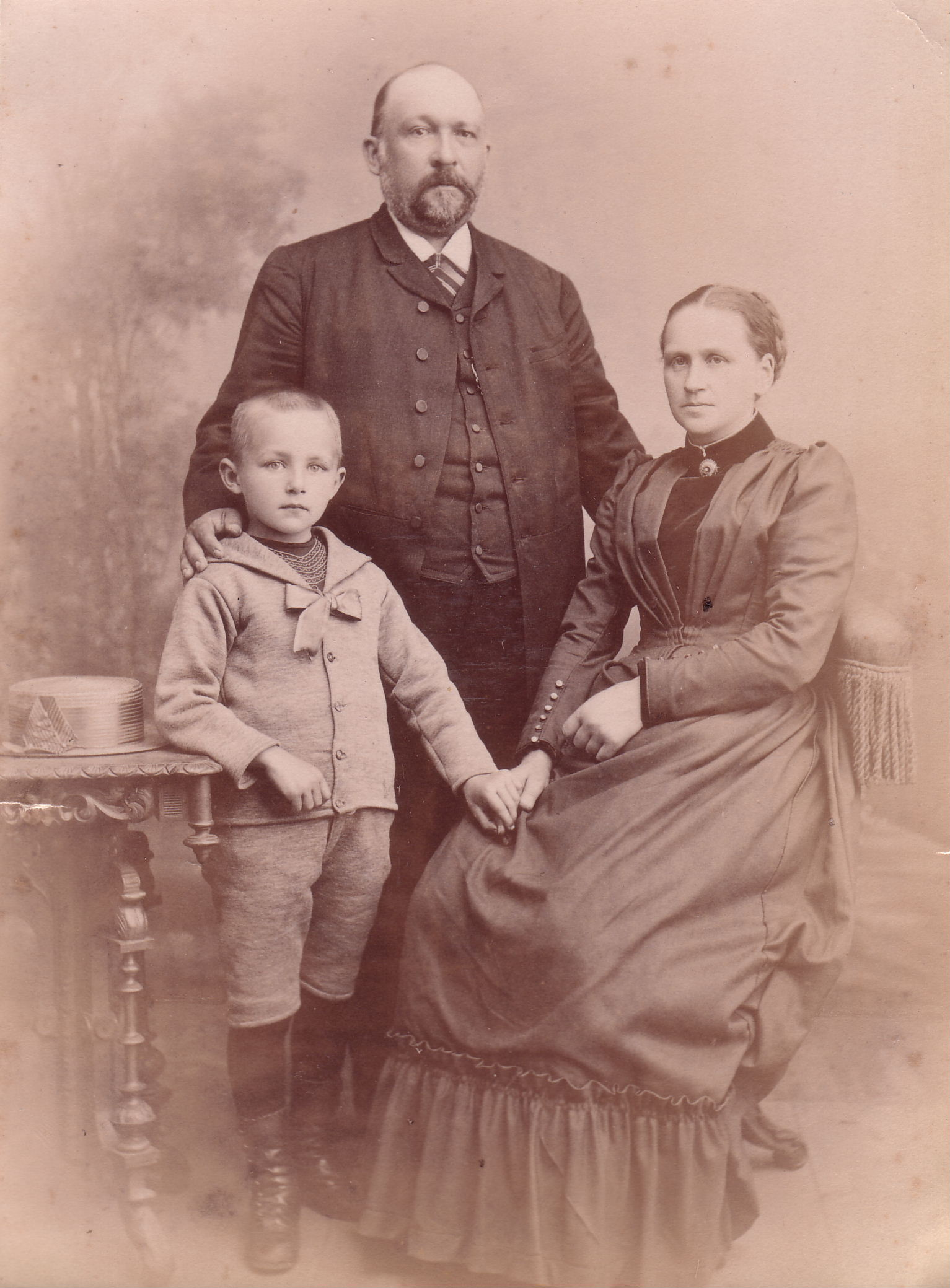
Otto Luyken with his parents ca. 1890

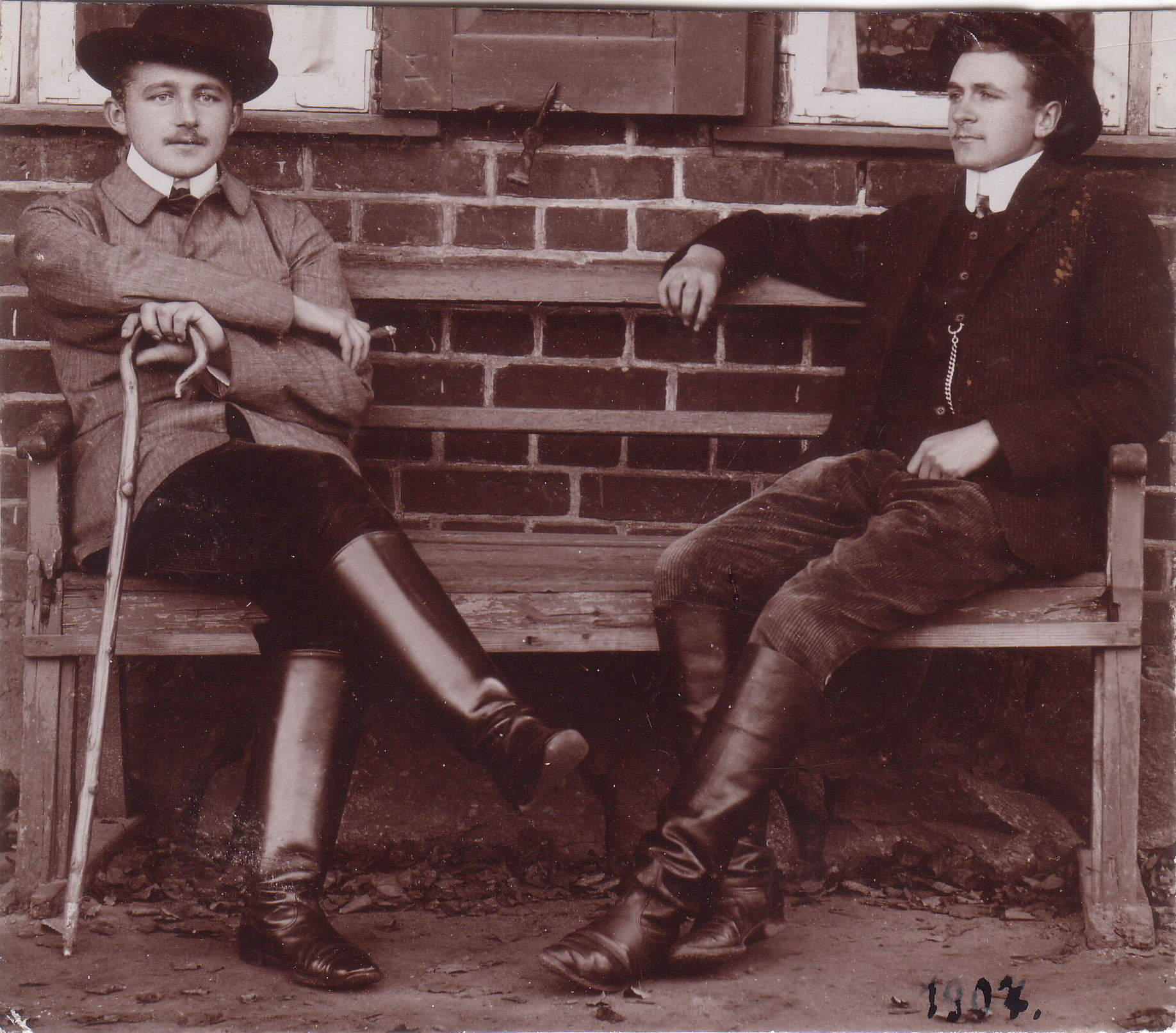
Otto Luyken (left) October 1907
