= Sri Lanka at the 2015 World Championships in Athletics =

- WA code: SRI

in Beijing
- Competitors: 2
- Medals: Gold 0 Silver 0 Bronze 0 Total 0

World Championships in Athletics appearances
- 1983; 1987–1991; 1993; 1995; 1997; 1999; 2001; 2003; 2005; 2007; 2009; 2011; 2013; 2015; 2017; 2019; 2022; 2023; 2025

Sri Lanka competed at the 2015 World Championships in Athletics in Beijing, China, from 22–30 August 2015.

== Results ==
Track and road events

(q – qualified, NM – no mark, SB – season best) Sri Lanka qualified two marathon runners.

| Athlete | Event | Final | |
| Athlete | Event | Result | Rank |
|---|---|---|---|
| Anuradha Cooray | Men's marathon | 2:25:04 | 29 |
| Niluka Geethani Rajasekara | Women's marathon | 2:50:40 | 49 |
