= William Henry Luick Farmhouse =

Historic house in Indiana, United States

- U.S. National Register of Historic Places
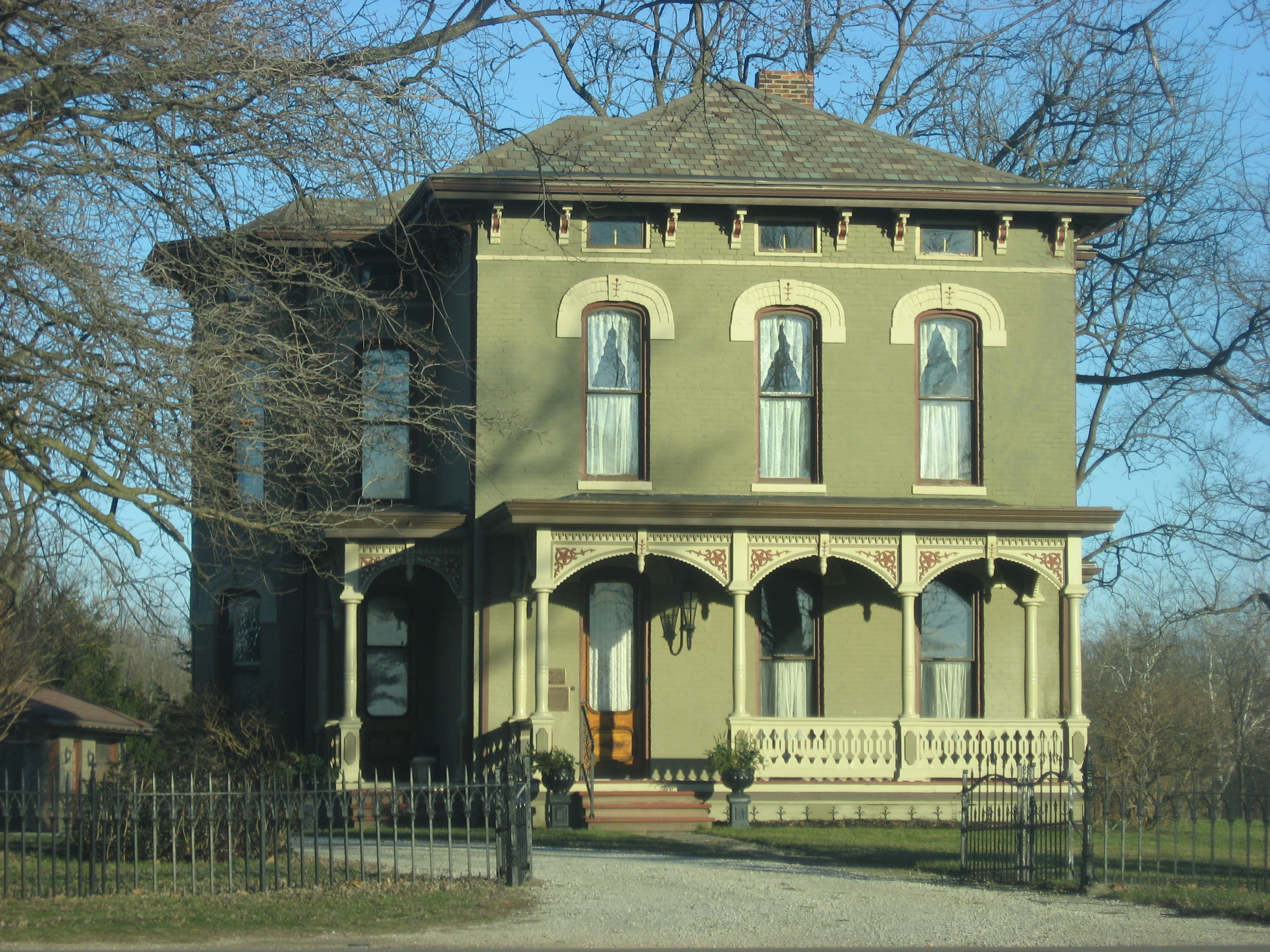
- William Henry Luick Farmhouse, January 2012

- Location within Indiana Location within the United States
- Location: 2304 Burlington Dr., Muncie, Indiana
- Coordinates: 40°10′30″N 85°20′43″W
- Area: 5 acres (2.0 ha)
- Built: 1882
- Architectural style: Italianate
- NRHP reference No.: 94000588
- Added to NRHP: June 10, 1994

William Henry Luick Farmhouse is a historic home located in Muncie, Indiana. It was built in 1882, and is a two-story, three-bay, Italianate style brick dwelling. It has a limestone faced fieldstone foundation, a reconstructed full-width front porch, and round arch windows.

The home is named for William Henry Luick, who lived in the home with his wife, Anna (née Mill), for many years. Originally from Winchester, Indiana, Luick was a farmer and horticulturist of German origin. During the Indiana gas boom, a gas well was discovered on the property.

It was added to the National Register of Historic Places in 1994.
