= Sri Lanka at the 2022 World Athletics Championships =

Sri Lanka at the 2022 World Championships in Athletics
- WA code: SRI
- National federation: Athletics Association Of Sri Lanka

in Eugene, Oregon, United States
- Competitors: 3 (1 man and 2 women)
- Medals: Gold 0 Silver 0 Bronze 0 Total 0

World Championships in Athletics appearances
- 1983; 1987–1991; 1993; 1995; 1997; 1999; 2001; 2003; 2005; 2007; 2009; 2011; 2013; 2015; 2017; 2019; 2022; 2023; 2025

Sri Lanka competed at the 2022 World Championships in Athletics in Eugene, Oregon, United States, from July 15−24, 2022.

Sri Lanka qualified three athletes (one man and two women).

== Results ==
Track and road events

Athlete	Event	Heat		Semifinal		Final	
Athlete	Event	Result	Rank	Result	Rank	Result	Rank
Yupun Abeykoon	Men's 100 metres	10.19	5	did not advance			
Gayanthika Abeyratne	Women's 800 metres	2:02.35	5	Did not advance			
Nilani Rathnayake	3000 metres steeplechase	9:54.10	13	—N/a		did not advance	

== Non-competing athlete ==
National record holder in the women's long jump Sarangi Silva qualified to compete after the withdrawal of a couple of athletes. Silva would have been the first Sri Lankan to compete in a jumping discipline at the World Athletics Championships for the country. However, Silva decided to decline her place to focus on the 2022 Commonwealth Games.

== See also ==
- Sri Lanka at the 2022 Commonwealth Games
