= Marc Luyckx Ghisi =

Belgian essayist

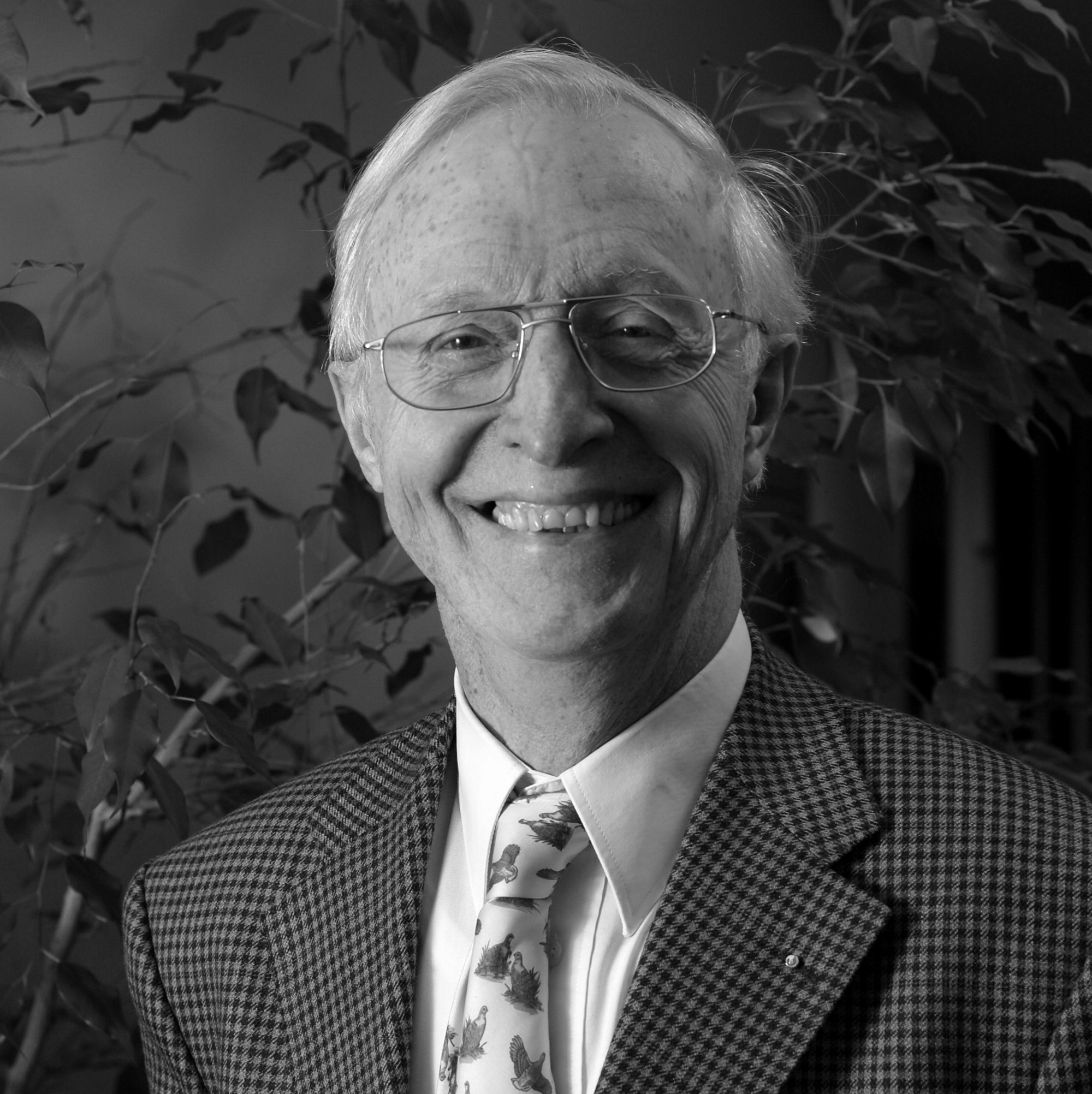
Marc Luyckx Ghisi

Marc Luyckx Ghisi was born 20 April 1942 in Louvain, Belgium. He lives with his wife Isabelle near Brussels. Initially, he studied mathematics, philosophy and theology (Ph.D.) and became a Catholic priest. He presented a doctorate in Rome (Pontifical Oriental Institute), in Russian and Greek theology, on Nikolai Berdyaev's early writings in Russian, since his discovery of Marxism until his conversion to orthodoxy" (Pontifical Oriental Institute, Rome). After his marriage, he was for ten years (1990-1999), member of the Forward Studies Unit of the European Commission, created by Jacques Delors, where he focused on the meaning of European integration and created the programme The soul of Europe. He had the opportunity to travel a lot and meet worldwide government officials and advisors in Europe, the U.S., China, Japan, or in India. Some were aware of the shift of civilization in which we are engaged globally, but these visionaries were a minority.

In the Forward Studies Unit he invited many thinkers such as US sociologist Paul H. Ray (cultural creatives), Edgar Morin (a leading French philosopher of the paradigm shift), Hazel Henderson (author of numerous books on the win-win economy and the new green sustainable economy), Rinaldo Brutoco (CEO of World Business Academy), Avon Mattison (founder of Pathways to Peace), Harlan Cleveland, (President of the World Academy of Art and Science), Prof. Ziauddin Sardar.

He was Dean of the Cotrugli Business School in Zagreb and Belgrade (2005-2009). For 8 years he has also been a member of the Auroville International Advisory Council in South India. He is a Fellow of the World Business Academy, a member of the Club of Rome-EU, a member of the World Futures Studies Federation and is Honorary President of Eurotas, European Transpersonal Association.

== Individual work ==
=== A Congress in the European Commission in 1998: The transmodern Hypothesis: A new dialogue between cultures seems possible ===
In May 1998, the "Forward Studies Unit" organized with the World Academy of Art and Science a Congress on "Civilizations and Governance", in the Brussels headquarters of the European Commission. We were presenting the hypothesis of a worldwide shift to a transmodern world. This hypothesis has been published in "World Affairs", in the "Integral Review" and in "Futures". And this seems to be worldwide. There are indications that the same shift to a transmodern vision of religion and culture is happening around the world: inside the Muslim world (Ziauddin Sardar), in China (Nicanor Perlas), and in South America (Leonardo Boff). And in this transmodern vision, a new type of dialogue between religions and civilizations is increasingly coming up, from the bottom of our societies. The minutes of this International Congress can be found on "The Future of Religions"

=== Willis Harman: The tool change is the vision of consciousness ===
As a member of the Forward Studies Unit, I had the great honour to meet with a genius thinker in the Silicon Valley: Willis Harman. According to Willis Harman in the late Middle Ages, the civilization shifted to the Renaissance because Copernicus proposed a new way of conceiving the Earth and the sky. Similarly today, the culture shift is happening around a new definition of consciousness and matter. We are leaving metaphysics "M1", which says that matter exists and that consciousness emanates from matter and some quantic scientists are already in a new metaphysics "M3" who discovers that consciousness is first and allows the emergence of matter. According to Harman, this conceptual earthquake, transforms the scientific method itself. And the "new science" is increasingly similar to the latest developments in quantum physics. Harman considers that this transmodern science resembles the vision of Humanity’s Perennial Wisdom and that opposition between science and philosophy will disappear slowly.

=== A New Economic Paradigm: The European Commission White Book of 1993 ===
In 1993, The European Commission published a White Paper on « Growth, Competitiveness, employment: The challenges of the 21st century». The Forward Studies Unit coordinated this study. It was announcing a shift to a post-industrial information society and was proposing very daring reforms in taxation, education, and of the European development model itself. This new vision proposed by Jacques Delors himself, has been politely refused by the EU Head of State, in the European Council of December 1993.

In 2000, seven years later, the Portuguese government proposed the EU leaders to launch the "Lisbon Strategy" aimed at bringing the EU in the new "knowledge society". Portuguese Prime Minister António Guterres, and Prof Maria Joao Rodrigues warned the EU Heads of State that this new strategy was a new economic paradigm.[13] This “paradigm shift” concept has been politely refused.

Indeed knowledge is different from industrial objects, the more you share it, the more you receive back. The knowledge economy is an economy of sharing that modifies the basic axioms of the industrial logic. It is post-capitalist (Peter Drucker), because the means of production are no longer the factory, but the humans who create knowledge. The analysis of this shift to the knowledge economy is also analyzed by Jeremy Rifkin in one of his latest books.

== Publications ==
=== In English ===
Marc Luyckx Ghisi, The knowledge society: a breakthrough toward genuine Sustainability, Arunachala Press, Stonehill foundation Publishing, Cochin, India, 2008, open source on http://www.marcluyckx.be

Marc Luyckx Ghisi, A win-Win strategy for the European Union in the Knowledge Society, in Paul Kidd, Ed., Cheshire Henbury, Macclesfield, UK, 2007, open source on http://www.marcluyckx.be

=== In French ===
Marc Luyckx Ghisi, Au-delà de la modernité du patriarcat et du capitalisme : la société réenchantée, L’Harmattan, Paris, 2001, open source on http://www.marcluyckx.be

Marc Luyckx Ghisi, Surgissement d’un nouveau monde : valeurs, visions, économie, politique, tout change… , L’Harmattan, Paris, 2013, open source on http://www.marcluyckx.be

=== In Italian ===
Marc Luyckx Ghisi, La società della conoscenza: valori visioni, economia, politica,... tutto sta cambiando, Editions (électronique) E-Bookizzati, Torino, 2011. https://web.archive.org/web/20140714134606/http://www.ebookizzati.it/ebook-marc-luyckx-ghisi-idaut30.html, open source on http://www.marcluyckx.be

Marc Luyckx Ghisi, Co-Creare la Nuova Civilità, Editions (électronique), open source on http://www.marcluyckx.be
