= Sri Lanka at the 2013 World Championships in Athletics =

- WA code: SRI
- National federation: Athletic Association of Sri Lanka
- Website: www.srilankaathletics.com

in Moscow
- Competitors: 8
- Medals: Gold 0 Silver 0 Bronze 0 Total 0

World Championships in Athletics appearances
- 1983; 1987–1991; 1993; 1995; 1997; 1999; 2001; 2003; 2005; 2007; 2009; 2011; 2013; 2015; 2017; 2019; 2022; 2023; 2025

Sri Lanka competed at the 2013 World Championships in Athletics in Moscow, Russia, from 10 to 18 August 2013. A team of 8 athletes was announced to represent the country in the event. The men's 4x400 relay team qualified for the event by meeting the qualification time and winning the bronze medal at the 2013 Asian Athletics Championships in Pune, India. Both Lakmali and Merill qualified for the event by breaking the national record in their respective events (and by exceeding the qualification standard).

== Results ==
(q – qualified, NM – no mark, SB – season best)

=== Men ===
Track and road events

Athlete	Event	Heats		Semifinals		Final	
Athlete	Event	Time	Rank	Time	Rank	Time	Rank
Dilhan Aloka; Chanaka Jayasekara; Dulan Priyashantha; Kalhara Seneviratne; Dasun De Silva; Anjana Gunaratne	4 × 400 metres relay	3:06.59	24			Did not advance	

- Athletes in italics did not race

=== Women ===
Track and road events

Athlete	Event	Heats		Semifinals		Final	
Athlete	Event	Time	Rank	Time	Rank	Time	Rank
Christine Sonali Merrill	400 metres hurdles	DQ		did not advance			

Field events

Athlete	Event	Preliminaries		Final	
Athlete	Event	Width Height	Rank	Width Height	Rank
Nadeeka Lakmali	Javelin throw	60.39 q	12	58.16	12
