= Niluka Geethani Rajasekara =

Sri Lankan long-distance runner

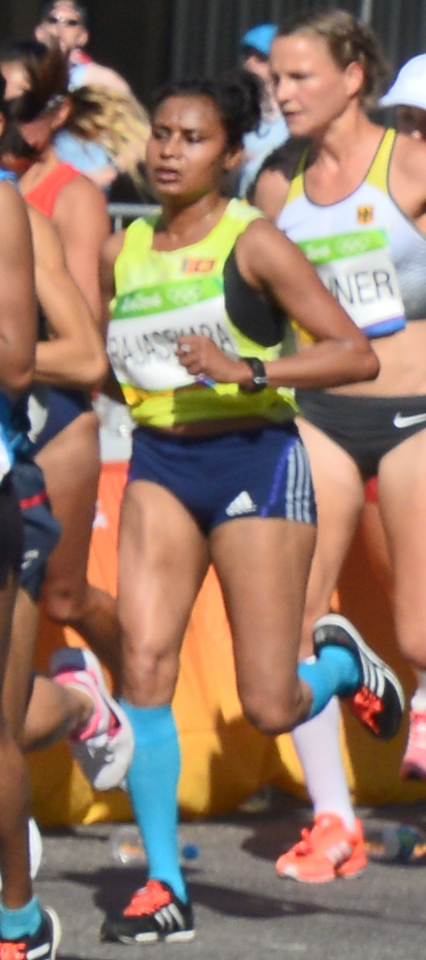

Personal information
- Full name: Bogaha Kotuwe Gedara Niluka Geethani Rajasekara
- Born: 17 March 1982 (age 44) Kandy, Sri Lanka

Sport
- Country: Sri Lanka
- Sport: Track and field
- Event: long-distance running
- Updated on 2 September 2015

Bogaha Kotuwe Gedara Niluka Geethani Rajasekara (born 17 March 1982) is a female Sri Lankan long-distance runner. With a time of 2 hours 40.07 minutes, and a new Sri Lankan record, at the 2015 Hong Kong marathon, Rajasekara achieved the qualifying standard for the marathon at the 2016 Summer Olympics. She competed in the marathon event at the 2015 World Championships in Athletics in Beijing, China, finishing 49th.

At the 2015 Hong Kong marathon on 25 January 2015 she ran a Sri Lankan record in the marathon in a time of 2 hours 40.07 minutes. At the 2016 Summer Olympics she finished 129th out of a field of 157.

== See also ==
- Sri Lanka at the 2015 World Championships in Athletics
