= Luuk =

Luuk may refer to:

Places:

- Luuk, Sulu, 4th class municipality in the province of Sulu, Philippines
- Liège, City in Belgium, known in Limburgish as Luuk

People:

- Kristian Luuk (born 1966), Swedish comedian and talk show-host of Estonian descent
- Luuk Balkestein (born 1954), retired Dutch football player
- Luuk de Jong (born 1990), Dutch footballer
- Luuk Folkerts (born 1963), Dutch politician and environmental consultant
- Luuk Gruwez (born 1953), Flemish poet
- Luuk Tinbergen (1915–1955), Dutch ornithologist and ecologist
- Luuk van Middelaar (born 1973), Dutch historian and liberal philosopher
- Luuk van Troost (born 1969), Dutch former cricketer, captained the national team

== See also ==
- Sen kväll med Luuk (Late night with Luuk) was one of Sweden's and TV4's most popular talk shows ever and started airing in 1996
