= Liina Luik =

Estonian long-distance runner

Personal information
- Born: 14 October 1985 (age 40)
- Education: University of Tartu Viljandi Culture Academy
- Height: 1.64 m (5 ft 4 1/2 in)
- Weight: 48 kg (106 lb)

Sport
- Country: Estonia
- Sport: Track and field
- Event: Marathon
- Club: Tartu Ulikooli Akadeemiline Spordiklubi
- Coached by: Harry Lemberg

Achievements and titles
- Personal best: 2:39:42 (2015)

Liina Luik (born 14 October 1985) is an Estonian long-distance runner. She competed in the marathon at the 2015 World Championships in Athletics in Beijing, China.

She is one of an identical triplet, sister of Lily and Leila. All three qualified to participate in the marathon event representing Estonia at the 2016 Summer Olympics in Rio de Janeiro. The triplets were professional dancers before Liina brought them to running.
