= Leila Luik =

Estonian long-distance runner

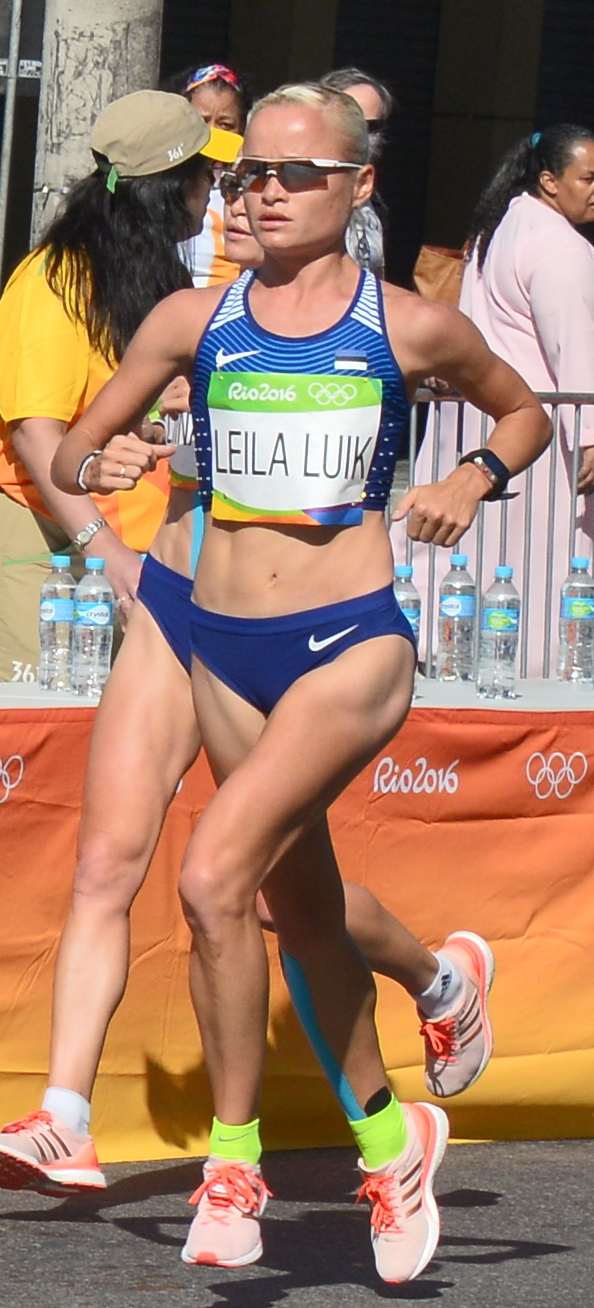
- Luik at the 2016 Olympics

Personal information
- Born: 14 October 1985 (age 40)
- Education: Tartu Health Care College
- Height: 1.65 m (5 ft 5 in)
- Weight: 48 kg (106 lb)

Sport
- Country: Estonia
- Sport: Track and field
- Event: Marathon
- Club: Tartu Ulikooli Akadeemiline Spordiklubi
- Coached by: Harry Lemberg

Achievements and titles
- Personal best: 2:37:11 (2013)

Leila Luik (born 14 October 1985) is an Estonian long-distance runner. She completed the Shanghai marathon with her personal best 2:37:11 in 2013. She qualified to the Rio Olympics 2016 running the Hamburg marathon in 2:42:11.

She is one of identical triplets, sister of Liina and Lily. All three qualified to participate in the marathon event representing Estonia at the 2016 Summer Olympics in Rio de Janeiro. The triplets were professional dancers before Liina brought them to running.
