= Sri Lanka at the 2011 World Championships in Athletics =

- WA code: SRI
- National federation: Athletic Association of Sri Lanka
- Website: www.aaofsrilanka.org

in Daegu
- Competitors: 2
- Medals: Gold 0 Silver 0 Bronze 0 Total 0

World Championships in Athletics appearances
- 1983; 1987–1991; 1993; 1995; 1997; 1999; 2001; 2003; 2005; 2007; 2009; 2011; 2013; 2015; 2017; 2019; 2022; 2023

Sri Lanka competed at the 2011 World Championships in Athletics from August 27 to September 4 in Daegu, South Korea. A team of two athletes was announced, however both athletes did not meet qualifying standards and are "wildcards".

The two athletes selected hold the national record in each of their respective events and were the only two Sri Lankan medalists at the 2011 Asian Championship in Kobe, Japan, both winning the bronze medal in their events.

== Results ==
=== Men ===
Athlete	Event	Heats		Semifinals		Final	
Athlete	Event	Time	Rank	Time	Rank	Time	Rank
Chaminda Wijekoon	1500 metres	3:39.61 NR	7 Q	3:44.81	12	Did not advance	

=== Women ===
Athlete	Event	Heats		Semifinals		Final	
Athlete	Event	Time	Rank	Time	Rank	Time	Rank
Christine Merrill	400 metres hurdles	57.05	27	Did not advance			
