= Annelie Johansson =

Swedish long-distance runner (born 1978)

Personal information
- Born: 21 December 1978 (age 47)

Sport
- Country: Sweden
- Sport: Track and field
- Event: Marathon

Annelie Johansson (born 21 December 1978) is a Swedish long-distance runner. She competed in the marathon event at the 2015 World Championships in Athletics in Beijing, China.
