= Charlotte Karlsson =

Swedish long-distance runner

Personal information
- Born: 18 August 1984 (age 41)

Sport
- Country: Sweden
- Sport: Track and field
- Event: Marathon

Charlotte Karlsson (born 18 August 1984) is a Swedish long-distance runner. She competed in the marathon event at the 2015 World Championships in Athletics in Beijing, China.
