= List of Santomean records in athletics =

The following are the national records in athletics in São Tomé and Príncipe maintained by São Tomé and Príncipe's national athletics federation: Federaçao Santomense de Atletismo (FSA).

== Outdoor ==
Key to tables: Awaiting ratification Record not kept by FSA

=== Men ===
Event	Record	Athlete	Date	Meet	Place	Ref.
100 m	10.61 (±0.0 m/s)	Yazaldes Nascimento	1 June 2007		Leiria, Portugal	
200 m	21.42	Odair Péricles Da Costa	18 June 1997		Barcelona, Spain	
400 m	46.07	Filipe Lomba	5 July 1987		Lisbon, Portugal	
800 m	1:52.8 h	António Cadio Paraiso	27 August 1981	Central African Games	Luanda, Angola	
1500 m	4:02.3 h	António Cadio Paraiso	2 January 1984		Luanda, Angola	
3000 m	9:05.9 h	Mário Pitra	29 May 1982		São Tomé, São Tomé and Príncipe	
5000 m	15:12.0 h	B. Hedges do Espirito Santo	24 February 2001		São Tomé, São Tomé and Príncipe	
10,000 m	33:30.0 h	Mário Pitra	5 June 1982		São Tomé, São Tomé and Príncipe	
Half marathon	1:15:14	Ilidio Vaz	5 December 2010	Macau Half Marathon	Macau	
Marathon	2:38:32	Mário Pitra	29 June 1980		Brazzaville, People's Republic of Congo	
110 m hurdles	15.06	Arlindo Pinheiro	14 July 2002		Lisbon, Portugal	
400 m hurdles	53.69	Arlindo Pinheiro	21 July 2001		Lisbon, Portugal	
3000 m steeplechase	10:08.0 h	Mário Pitra	25 August 1981	Central African Games	Luanda, Angola	
High jump	2.01 m	Hedson Trindade	18 July 2010		Leiria, Portugal	
Pole vault	4.10 m	Edgar Campre	25 June 2017		Abrantes, Portugal	
Pole vault	4.30 m	Celio Quaresma	25 June 2023		Lisbon, Portugal	
Long jump	7.02 m	Juary Tavares	6 June 2015		Lisbon, Portugal	
Triple jump	14.68 m (−0.1 m/s)	Frederico Eusébio	17 July 2010		Leiria, Portugal	
Shot put	13.07 m	Hedson Trindade	2 July 2008		Coimbra, Portugal	
Discus throw	35.14 m	Teotónio Menezes	24 May 1982		São Tomé, São Tomé and Príncipe	
Hammer throw	21.90 m	Contâncio Manuel	19 June 1982		São Tomé, São Tomé and Príncipe	
Javelin throw	55.79 m	Adeonaldo Freitas	6 May 2017		Leiria, Portugal	
Decathlon	4909 pts h	Carlos Amado	30–31 August 1996		Hässelby, Sweden	
Decathlon	100m / Long jump / Shot put / High jump / 400m / 110m H / Discus / Pole vault / Javelin / 1500m; 11.0 / 6.26 m / 10.12 m / 1.65 m / 51.8 / 20.9 / 23.74 m / 2.81 m / 32.44 m / 5:14.6					
5000 m walk (track)	23:11.52	Sidney Santos Jr.	14 January 2017		Setúbal, Portugal	
10,000 m walk (track)	49:08.58	Sidney Santos Jr.	15 June 2016		Faro, Portugal	
20 km walk (road)	1:44:12	Sidney Santos Jr.	17 December 2017		Leiria, Portugal	
50 km walk (road)						
4 × 100 m relay	43.4 h	São Tomé and Príncipe; Alve; Filipe; Raimundo; António Cadio Paraiso	10 July 1982		São Tomé, São Tomé and Príncipe	
4 × 400 m relay	3:20.7 h	São Tomé and Príncipe; Filipe Lomba; António Cadio Paraiso; Raimundo Victor Lima; S. Duarte	27 August 1981	Central African Games	Luanda, Angola	

=== Women ===
Event	Record	Athlete	Date	Meet	Place	Ref.
100 m	11.48 (−1.1 m/s)	Gorete Semedo	14 May 2022	Meeting Vitor Tavares	Faro, Portugal	
100 m	11.31 (+1.2 m/s)	Gorete Semedo	10 June 2022	Memorial Moniz Pereira	Lisbon, Portugal	
200 m	24.01 (−0.3 m/s)	Gorete Semedo	17 April 2021	Provas de Preparação	Lisbon, Portugal	
200 m	23.19 (+1.7 m/s)	Gorete Semedo	18 May 2024	Meeting Cidade de Lisboa	Lisbon, Portugal	
400 m	56.15	Severina Cravid	12 July 1997		Funchal, Portugal	
800 m	2:09.38	Euridice Semedo Borges	13 July 2000	African Championships	Algiers, Algeria	
1500 m	4:30.87	Euridice Semedo Borges	25 July 2000		Barcelona, Spain	
3000 m	9:56.5 h	Celma Bonfim da Graça	24 April 2016		Lisbon, Portugal	
5000 m	17:25.99	Celma Bonfim da Graça	19 August 2008	Olympic Games	Beijing, China	
10,000 m						
20 km (road)	1:15:30+	Celma Bonfim da Graça	20 March 2016	Lisbon Half Marathon	Lisbon, Portugal	
Half marathon	1:19:49	Celma Bonfim da Graça	20 March 2016	Lisbon Half Marathon	Lisbon, Portugal	
Marathon						
100 m hurdles	14.06	Naide Gomes (Note: Naide Gomes became a Portuguese citizen on 4 May 2001.)	29 July 2000		Funchal, Portugal	
400 m hurdles	1:01.36	Inicia Fonseca Coelho	1 July 1997		Mataró, Spain	
3000 m steeplechase	10:42.48	Celma Bonfim	31 May 2008		Lisbon, Portugal	
High jump	1.80 m	Naide Gomes	19 August 2000		Logroño, Spain	
Pole vault	2.80 m	Nair Varela	18 June 2005		Seixal, Portugal	
Long jump	6.72 m (+1.8 m/s)	Agate de Sousa	7 May 2022	Meeting Ibiza d'Atletisme Toni Bonet	Ibiza, Spain	
Long jump	6.81 m (+0.5 m/s)	Agate de Sousa	5 June 2022	Janusz Kusociński Memorial	Chorzów, Poland	
Long jump	7.03 m (+1.7 m/s)	Agate de Sousa	27 May 2023	Kurpfalz-Gala	Weinheim, Germany	
Triple jump	13.31 m (+1.9 m/s)	Lecabela Quaresma	2 June 2011	Meeting National D2	Bonneuil-sur-Marne, France	
Shot put	13.22 m	Naide Gomes	10 February 2001		Almada, Portugal	
Discus throw	34.10 m	Lecabela Quaresma	2 July 2006		Seixal, Portugal	
Hammer throw	33.40 m	Souskay Varela	11 June 2003		Lisbon, Portugal	
Javelin throw	42.86 m	Naide Gomes	13 July 2000	African Championships	Algiers, Algeria	
Heptathlon	5671 pts	Naide Gomes	19–20 August 2000		Logroño, Spain	
Heptathlon	100m H / High jump / Shot put / 200m / Long jump / Javelin / 800m; 14.48 / 1.80 m / 13.12 m / 25.87 / 6.07 m / 42.64 m / 2:33.66					
20 km walk (road)	2:04:06	Fumilay Da Fonseca	15 July 2004	African Championships	Brazzaville, Republic of the Congo	
50 km walk (road)						
4 × 100 m relay	51.9 h	São Tomé and Príncipe; Torres; L. Martins; T. de Conceição; Ivete dos Santos	10 July 1982		São Tomé, São Tomé and Príncipe	
4 × 400 m relay	4:06.14	São Tomé and Príncipe; Glória Santo; Lecabela Quaresma; Celma Bonfim; Ludmila Leal	13 July 2009	Lusophony Games	Lisbon, Portugal	

== Indoor ==
=== Men ===
Event	Record	Athlete	Date	Meet	Place	Ref.
60 m	6.95	Yazaldes Nascimento	5 February 2005		Espinho, Portugal	
60 m	6.95	Yazaldes Nascimento	18 February 2006		Espinho, Portugal	
200 m	22.09	Yazaldes Nascimento	19 February 2006		Espinho, Portugal	
400 m	49.68	Naiel Almeida	14 February 2009		Pombal, Portugal	
400 m	48.5 h	Filipe Lomba	20 February 1988		Braga, Portugal	
800 m	2:00.42	Pedro Semedo	29 January 2006		Espinho, Portugal	
1500 m	4:10.74	Homilzio Santos	17 January 2009		Espinho, Portugal	
3000 m						
60 m hurdles	8.46	Arlindo Leocadio Pinheiro	18 January 2003		Espinho, Portugal	
High jump	2.01 m (Note: Outdoor mark ratified as absolute record)	Hedson Trindade	31 January 2010		Pombal, Portugal	
Pole vault						
Long jump	6.66 m	Frederico Eusébio	5 February 2011		Pombal, Portugal	
Long jump	7.13 m	Jocimar Neto	2 March 2024	Portuguese U23 Championships	Pombal, Portugal	
Triple jump	14.85 m	Frederico Eusébio	6 February 2011		Pombal, Portugal	
Shot put	13.10 m	Hedson Trindade	6 January 2008	Portuguese Championships	Pombal, Portugal	
Heptathlon						
Heptathlon	60m / Long jump / Shot put / High jump / 60m H / Pole vault / 1000m					
5000 m walk	23:53.41	Sidney Santos Jr.	28 January 2017		Braga, Portugal	
4 × 400 m relay						

=== Women ===
Event	Record	Athlete	Date	Meet	Place	Ref.
60 m	7.33	Gorete Semedo	16 January 2022		Lisbon, Portugal	
200 m	24.85	Gorete Semedo	25 January 2020		Pombal, Portugal	
200 m	23.74	Gorete Semedo	27 February 2022		Pombal, Portugal	
400 m	57.66	Ludmila Leal	16 February 2008		Pombal, Portugal	
400 m	53.68	Gorete Semedo	10 February 2024	Portuguese Club Championships	Pombal, Portugal	
800 m	2:15.09	Celma Bonfim	16 February 2008		Pombal, Portugal	
1500 m	4:37.89	Celma Bonfim	2 February 2008		Espinho, Portugal	
3000 m	9:48.97	Celma Bonfim da Graça	3 February 2008		Espinho, Portugal	
60 m hurdles	8.67	Lecabela Quaresma	23 February 2014		Pombal, Portugal	
High jump	1.79 m	Naide Gomes	13 February 2000		Espinho, Portugal	
High jump	1.79 m	Naide Gomes	4 March 2001		Lisbon, Portugal	
Pole vault	2.78 m	Nair Varela	22 January 2006		Espinho, Portugal	
Long jump	6.68 m	Agate de Sousa	10 January 2021	Meeting Moniz Pereira	Lisbon, Portugal	
Triple jump	12.26 m	Lecabela Quaresma	10 January 2010	FPA Cup	Alpiarca, Portugal	
Shot put	13.22 m	Naide Gomes	10 February 2001		Almada, Portugal	
Pentathlon	3965 pts	Naide Gomes	24 February 2001		Espinho, Portugal	
Pentathlon	60m H / High jump / Shot put / Long jump / 800m; 8.83 / 1.71 m / 13.06 m / 5.96 m / 2:39.06					
3000 m walk						
4 × 400 m relay						
