= Athletics at the 2009 Lusofonia Games – Results =

These are the official results of the athletics competition at the 2009 Lusophone Games which took place on 12–13 and 19 July 2009 in Lisbon, Portugal. Several athletes, including many medalists were later disqualified for doping.

== Men's results ==
=== 100 meters ===
Heats – July 12
Wind:
Heat 1: +2.8 m/s, Heat 2: +2.4 m/s

Rank	Heat	Name	Nationality	Time	Notes
1	1	Francis Obikwelu	Portugal	10.38	Q
2	2	José Carlos Moreira	Brazil	10.41	Q
3	2	Holder da Silva	Guinea-Bissau	10.42	Q
4	1	Shehan Ambepitiya	Sri Lanka	10.43	Q
~~5~~	1	~~Jorge Célio Sena~~	~~Brazil~~	~~10.47~~	Q, DQ
6	2	Dany Gonçalves	Portugal	10.52	Q
7	2	Ashan Ranasinghe	Sri Lanka	10.53	q
8	1	Ancuiam Lopes	Guinea-Bissau	10.89	q
9	1	Pao Hin Fong	Macau	10.98	
10	1	Carlos Livramento	Cape Verde	11.32	
11	2	Ademir Barbosa	Cape Verde	11.42	
12	2	Bonifacio Esono Abaga	Equatorial Guinea	11.56	

Final – July 12
Wind:
+1.7 m/s

Rank	Lane	Name	Nationality	Time	Notes
1st place, gold medalist(s)	3	Francis Obikwelu	Portugal	10.18	
2nd place, silver medalist(s)	4	José Carlos Moreira	Brazil	10.33	
3rd place, bronze medalist(s)	8	~~Jorge Célio Sena~~	~~Brazil~~	~~10.35~~	DQ
4	5	Holder da Silva	Guinea-Bissau	10.36	
5	6	Shehan Ambepitiya	Sri Lanka	10.49	
6	7	Dany Gonçalves	Portugal	10.54	
7	1	Ashan Ranasinghe	Sri Lanka	10.55	
8	2	Ancuiam Lopes	Guinea-Bissau	11.18	

=== 200 meters ===
Heats – July 13
Wind:
Heat 1: +2.4 m/s, Heat 2: +2.3 m/s

Rank	Heat	Name	Nationality	Time	Notes
~~1~~	1	~~Bruno Barros~~	~~Brazil~~	~~20.98~~	Q, DQ
2	1	Holder da Silva	Guinea-Bissau	21.13	Q
3	2	Arnaldo Abrantes	Portugal	21.16	Q
4	2	Hugo Sousa	Brazil	21.52	Q
5	2	Shehan Ambepitiya	Sri Lanka	21.67	Q
6	1	Sumeda Mudiyanselage	Sri Lanka	21.70	Q
7	1	Ivo Vital	Portugal	21.78	q
8	2	Vasude Maschindranath	India	23.01	q
9	2	Amândio Jorge Gomes	Cape Verde	23.28	
10	1	Carlos Livramento	Cape Verde	23.40	
11	2	Ismael Bassanguê	Guinea-Bissau	23.53	
12	2	Reginaldo Nguba	Equatorial Guinea	24.51	
	1	Edson Dongoxe	Angola	DNS	

Final – July 13
Wind:
+2.4 m/s

Rank	Lane	Name	Nationality	Time	Notes
1st place, gold medalist(s)	6	Arnaldo Abrantes	Portugal	20.64	
2nd place, silver medalist(s)	5	~~Bruno Barros~~	~~Brazil~~	~~20.78~~	DQ
3rd place, bronze medalist(s)	3	Hugo Sousa	Brazil	20.90	
4	4	Holder da Silva	Guinea-Bissau	21.18	
5	7	Shehan Ambepitiya	Sri Lanka	21.40	
6	8	Sumeda Mudiyanselage	Sri Lanka	21.89	
7	1	Vasude Maschindranath	India	22.94	
	2	Ivo Vital	Portugal	DNS	

=== 400 meters ===
July 12

Rank	Lane	Name	Nationality	Time	Notes
1st place, gold medalist(s)	4	Eduardo Vasconcelos	Brazil	46.32	
2nd place, silver medalist(s)	5	João Pedro Ferreira	Portugal	47.00	
3rd place, bronze medalist(s)	6	Luís Ambrosio	Brazil	47.14	
4	3	António Rodrigues	Portugal	47.20	
5	8	Sumeda Mudiyanselage	Sri Lanka	47.75	
6	7	Naiel D'Almeida	São Tomé and Príncipe	49.32	
7	2	Sandro Rocha	Cape Verde	52.47	
8	1	Adilson Couto	Cape Verde	55.32	

=== 800 meters ===
July 12

Rank	Name	Nationality	Time	Notes
1st place, gold medalist(s)	Lutmar Paes	Brazil	1:48.89	
2nd place, silver medalist(s)	Rui Silva	Portugal	1:49.03	
3rd place, bronze medalist(s)	Renato Silva	Portugal	1:49.68	
4	Diego Gomes	Brazil	1:50.91	
5	Edelângelo Mendes	Cape Verde	2:01.76	
6	Raffik Baldé	Guinea-Bissau	2:03.33	
7	Gilsson Tavares	Cape Verde	2:10.95	
8	Dimas Silva Soares	Timor-Leste	2:20.92	
	Manuel André Antonio	Angola	DNS	
	José Carlos Campos	Angola	DNS	

=== 1500 meters ===
July 13

Rank	Name	Nationality	Time	Notes
1st place, gold medalist(s)	Chaminda Wijekoon	Sri Lanka	3:48.15	
2nd place, silver medalist(s)	Hélio Gomes	Portugal	3:48.91	
3rd place, bronze medalist(s)	Hudson de Souza	Brazil	3:49.26	
4	Bruno Albuquerque	Portugal	3:49.95	
5	Eder da Silva	Brazil	3:50.04	
6	Ruben Sança	Cape Verde	3:55.78	
7	José Carlos Campos	Angola	4:05.87	
8	Raffik Baldé	Guinea-Bissau	4:07.78	
9	Américo Lima Monteiro	Cape Verde	4:11.61	
10	Benjamin Ovono	Equatorial Guinea	4:29.40	
11	Ribeiro de Carvalho	Timor-Leste	4:39.31	

=== 5000 meters ===
July 12

Rank	Name	Nationality	Time	Notes
1st place, gold medalist(s)	Manuel Damião	Portugal	14:34.69	
2nd place, silver medalist(s)	Eduardo Mbengani	Portugal	14:35.76	
3rd place, bronze medalist(s)	Ubiratán dos Santos	Brazil	14:51.73	
4	Manuel Brito	Cape Verde	15:46.33	
5	Paulo Mota	Cape Verde	16:20.76	
6	Ribeiro de Carvalho	Timor-Leste	16:34.34	
7	Francisco dos Santos	Timor-Leste	17:07.60	

=== 10 kilometers ===
Rank	Name	Nationality	Time	Notes
1st place, gold medalist(s)	Rui Pedro Silva	Portugal	30:14	
2nd place, silver medalist(s)	Daniel Silva	Brazil	30:30	
3rd place, bronze medalist(s)	Ricardo Ribas	Portugal	30:46	
4	Artur Santiago	Angola	30:47	
5	Nelson Cruz	Cape Verde	31:54	
6	Adilson Varela	Cape Verde	32:26	
7	Benjamim Ovono	Equatorial Guinea	35:59	

=== 110 meters hurdles ===
July 12
Wind: +1.7 m/s

Rank	Lane	Name	Nationality	Time	Notes
1st place, gold medalist(s)	6	Anselmo da Silva	Brazil	13.97	
2nd place, silver medalist(s)	5	Luís Sá	Portugal	14.22	
3rd place, bronze medalist(s)	3	Rasul Dabó	Portugal	14.35	
4	4	Éder Antônio Souza	Brazil	14.84	
	7	Iong Kim Fai	Macau	DNF	
	8	Ricardo Fernandes	Cape Verde	DNF	
	2	Helton Leal	Cape Verde	DNS	

=== 400 meters hurdles ===
July 13

Rank	Lane	Name	Nationality	Time	Notes
1st place, gold medalist(s)	4	Raphael Fernandes	Brazil	50.61	
2nd place, silver medalist(s)	6	João Santos Neto	Brazil	51.09	
3rd place, bronze medalist(s)	3	Kurt Couto	Mozambique	51.10	
4	5	Bruno Gualberto	Portugal	52.15	
5	2	Rasul Dabó	Portugal	54.17	
6	1	Ricardo Fernandes	Cape Verde	56.40	
7	7	Michel Gomis	Guinea-Bissau	56.72	
8	8	Daniel Fortes	Cape Verde	1:00.05	

=== 3000 meters steeplechase ===
July 13

Rank	Name	Nationality	Time	Notes
1st place, gold medalist(s)	Alberto Paulo	Portugal	8:38.48	
2nd place, silver medalist(s)	Pedro Ribeiro	Portugal	8:39.90	
3rd place, bronze medalist(s)	Fernando Alex Fernandes	Brazil	9:32.90	
4	Elias de Deus	Timor-Leste	10:23.04	
5	Anastácio Quintas	São Tomé and Príncipe	11:12.07	

=== 4 x 100 meters relay ===
July 13

Rank	Lane	Nation	Competitors	Time	Notes
1st place, gold medalist(s)	6	~~Brazil~~	~~Vicente de Lima, José Carlos Moreira, Jorge Célio Sena, Bruno Barros~~	~~39.30~~	DQ
2nd place, silver medalist(s)	3	Portugal	Dany Gonçalves, Arnaldo Abrantes, Edi Sousa, Francis Obikwelu	39.31	
3rd place, bronze medalist(s)	7	Sri Lanka	Mohamed Safran, Ashan Ranasinghe, Jeewan Warnakulasuriya, Shehan Ambepitiya	40.58	
4	5	Guinea-Bissau	Suaido Almeida, Ancuiam Lopes, Ismael Bassanguê, Michel Gomis	44.79	
5	4	Cape Verde	Ademir Barbosa, Amândio Jorge Gomes, Carlos Livramento, Lúcio Rocha	44.94	

=== 4 x 400 meters relay ===
July 13

Rank	Nation	Competitors	Time	Notes
1st place, gold medalist(s)	Brazil	Luís Ambrosio, Wallace Vieira, Rodrigo Bargas, Eduardo Vasconcelos	3:07.76	
2nd place, silver medalist(s)	Portugal	Filipe Santos, António Rodrigues, Bruno Gualberto, João Pedro Ferreira	3:13.10	
3rd place, bronze medalist(s)	Sri Lanka	Mohamed Safran, Ashan Ranasinghe, Jeewan Warnakulasuriya, Shehan Ambepitiya	3:21.70	
4	Cape Verde	Ademir Barbosa, Amândio Jorge Gomes, Carlos Livramento, Lúcio Rocha	3:34.63	
	Guinea-Bissau		DNS	

=== High jump ===
July 13

Rank	Name	Nationality	1.94	2.00	2.06	2.12	2.16	2.21	Result	Notes
1st place, gold medalist(s)	Guilherme Cobbo	Brazil	–	–	o	xxo	o	xxx	2.16	
2nd place, silver medalist(s)	Paulo Gonçalves	Portugal	–	o	o	xo	xxx		2.12	
3rd place, bronze medalist(s)	Ulika da Costa	Angola	o	o	o	xxx			2.06	
4	Roman Guliy	Portugal	–	o	xo	xxx			2.06	
5	Hedson Trindade	São Tomé and Príncipe	o	o	xxx				2.00	
	Yannik Medina	Cape Verde	xxx						NM	
	José Rosa	Cape Verde	xxx						NM	

=== Long jump ===
July 13

Rank	Name	Nationality	#1	#2	#3	#4	#5	#6	Result	Notes
1st place, gold medalist(s)	Marcos Chuva	Portugal	x	8.09w	7.75w	7.00w	7.58	x	8.09w	
2nd place, silver medalist(s)	Marcos Caldeira	Portugal	7.38	7.78w	x	x	7.83w	7.69	7.83w	
3rd place, bronze medalist(s)	Rogério Bispo	Brazil	7.44	7.78w	7.76w	7.70w	x	5.79	7.78w	
4	Erivaldo Vieira	Brazil	x	7.49	5.96	x	7.63w	5.98w	7.63w	
5	Duane Barros Gomes	Cape Verde	6.51w	6.43w	5.83w	x	–	–	6.51w	
6	Lúcio Rocha	Cape Verde	5.80w	5.89	4.75w	–	–	–	5.89	

=== Triple jump ===
July 13

Rank	Name	Nationality	#1	#2	#3	#4	#5	#6	Result	Notes
1st place, gold medalist(s)	Nelson Évora	Portugal	x	16.71	17.15	x	x	-	17.15	
2nd place, silver medalist(s)	Jefferson Sabino	Brazil	x	x	x	x	x	16.84	16.84	
3rd place, bronze medalist(s)	Marcos Caldeira	Portugal	16.15	16.41w	x	x	-	15.79	16.41	
~~4~~	~~Leonardo Elisiario dos Santos~~	~~Brazil~~	~~15.51w~~	~~15.61~~	~~16.02~~	~~x~~	~~x~~	~~15.80~~	~~16.02~~	DQ
5	Si Kuan Wong	Macau	14.46	15.33	14.72	x	-	-	15.33	NR
6	Célio Khibo	Angola	14.35	14.61w	x	x	14.41	13.72w	14.61w	
	Adilson Couto	Cape Verde							DNS	
	Eritson Couto	Cape Verde							DNS	

=== Shot put ===
July 12

Rank	Name	Nationality	#1	#2	#3	#4	#5	#6	Result	Notes
1st place, gold medalist(s)	Marco Fortes	Portugal	18.25	19.74	x	19.40	19.29	19.38	19.74	
2nd place, silver medalist(s)	Gustavo de Mendonça	Brazil	16.90	17.89	x	16.65	17.52	x	17.89	
3rd place, bronze medalist(s)	Ronald Julião	Brazil	17.24	17.21	x	17.63	x	x	17.63	
4	António Vital e Silva	Portugal	17.14	x	x	x	x	x	17.14	
5	Hou Fei	Macau	14.28	14.63	14.40	x	14.16	x	14.63	NR
6	Hedson Trindade	São Tomé and Príncipe	12.28	12.24	12.19	x	12.23	x	12.28	
7	José Rosa	Cape Verde	10.81	10.22	10.90	10.32	x	10.54	10.90	
	Duane Barros Gomes	Cape Verde							DNS	

== Women's results ==
=== 100 meters ===
July 12
Wind: +2.0 m/s

Rank	Lane	Name	Nationality	Time	Notes
1st place, gold medalist(s)	3	Lucimar Moura	Brazil	11.30	
2nd place, silver medalist(s)	4	Sónia Tavares	Portugal	11.39	
3rd place, bronze medalist(s)	7	Carla Tavares	Portugal	11.52	
4	6	Evelyn dos Santos	Brazil	11.57	
5	5	Glória Santo	São Tomé and Príncipe	11.71	
6	8	Pramila Dona	Sri Lanka	12.13	
7	1	Cheong Im Wa	Macau	12.51	
8	2	Beatriz Mangue	Equatorial Guinea	14.01	

=== 200 meters ===
July 13
Wind: +4.0 m/s

Rank	Lane	Name	Nationality	Time	Notes
1st place, gold medalist(s)	6	Sónia Tavares	Portugal	23.64	
2nd place, silver medalist(s)	5	Evelyn dos Santos	Brazil	23.79	
3rd place, bronze medalist(s)	3	Vanda Gomes	Brazil	23.91	
4	7	Chandrika Mudiyanselage	Sri Lanka	24.03	
5	4	Carla Tavares	Portugal	24.08	
6	8	Pramila Dona	Sri Lanka	25.52	
7	2	Lam Ka Im	Macau	26.39	

=== 400 meters ===
July 12

Rank	Lane	Name	Nationality	Time	Notes
1st place, gold medalist(s)	4	Jailma Lima	Brazil	52.63	
2nd place, silver medalist(s)	6	Emmily Pinheiro	Brazil	53.29	
3rd place, bronze medalist(s)	5	Chandrika Mudiyanselage	Sri Lanka	53.41	
4	3	Maria Carmo Tavares	Portugal	54.32	
5	7	Vera Barbosa	Portugal	54.89	
6	8	Ludmila Leal	São Tomé and Príncipe	58.40	
7	2	Diana Moniz	Cape Verde	66.08	

=== 800 meters ===
July 13

Rank	Name	Nationality	Time	Notes
1st place, gold medalist(s)	Sandra Teixeira	Portugal	2:06.42	
2nd place, silver medalist(s)	Christiane dos Santos	Brazil	2:07.14	
3rd place, bronze medalist(s)	~~Josiane Tito~~	~~Brazil~~	~~2:07.15~~	DQ
4	Leonor Piuza	Mozambique	2:07.48	
5	Joana Costa	Portugal	2:09.84	
6	Neide Dias	Angola	2:11.86	
7	Adimilda de Sousa	São Tomé and Príncipe	2:38.9	
	Emilia Mikue Ondo	Equatorial Guinea	DQ	
	Diana Moniz	Cape Verde	DNF	

=== 1500 meters ===
July 12

Rank	Name	Nationality	Time	Notes
1st place, gold medalist(s)	Jéssica Augusto	Portugal	4:15.86	
2nd place, silver medalist(s)	Sabine Heitling	Brazil	4:17.68	
3rd place, bronze medalist(s)	Christiane dos Santos	Brazil	4:21.45	
4	Lídia Sousa	Portugal	4:30.12	
	Neide Dias	Angola	DNS	

=== 5000 meters ===
July 13

Rank	Name	Nationality	Time	Notes
1st place, gold medalist(s)	Sara Moreira	Portugal	15:45.05	
2nd place, silver medalist(s)	Leonor Carneiro	Portugal	16:15.40	
3rd place, bronze medalist(s)	Fabiana Cristine da Silva	Brazil	16:21.79	
4	Nadir de Siqueira	Brazil	17:29.76	
5	Celma Bonfim	São Tomé and Príncipe	18:05.17	
6	Juventina Napoleão	Timor-Leste	20:38.00	

=== 10 kilometers ===
Rank	Name	Nationality	Time	Notes
1st place, gold medalist(s)	Fernanda Ribeiro	Portugal	32:49	
2nd place, silver medalist(s)	Marisa Barros	Portugal	33:14	
3rd place, bronze medalist(s)	Adriana Aparecida da Silva	Brazil	35:36	
4	Michele das Chagas	Brazil	35:42	
5	Celma Bonfim	São Tomé and Príncipe	40:35	
6	Eva Pereira	Cape Verde	44:56	
7	Emilia Mikue Ondo	Equatorial Guinea	46:15	

=== 100 meters hurdles ===
July 12
Wind: +0.5 m/s

Rank	Lane	Name	Nationality	Time	Notes
1st place, gold medalist(s)	5	Fabiana Morães	Brazil	13.32	
2nd place, silver medalist(s)	4	Mónica Lopes	Portugal	13.66	
3rd place, bronze medalist(s)	3	Giselle Albuquerque	Brazil	13.73	
4	6	Patrícia Mamona	Portugal	13.90	
	7	Lecabela Quaresma	São Tomé and Príncipe	DNF	

=== 400 meters hurdles ===
July 13
Wind: +0.5 m/s

Rank	Lane	Name	Nationality	Time	Notes
1st place, gold medalist(s)	6	~~Lucimar Teodoro~~	~~Brazil~~	~~56.69~~	DQ
2nd place, silver medalist(s)	5	Patrícia Lopes	Portugal	57.05	
3rd place, bronze medalist(s)	4	~~Luciana França~~	~~Brazil~~	~~58.52~~	DQ
4	3	Leslie Delgado	Portugal	1:03.81	
	7	Juliene Afonso Varela	São Tomé and Príncipe	DNF	

=== 4 x 100 meters relay ===
July 13

Rank	Lane	Nation	Competitors	Time	Notes
1st place, gold medalist(s)	3	Brazil	Rosemar Coelho Neto, Lucimar Moura, Thaissa Presti, Evelyn dos Santos	44.08	
2nd place, silver medalist(s)	4	Portugal	Andreia Felisberto, Tânia Duarte, Carla Tavares, Sónia Tavares	45.05	

=== 4 x 400 meters relay ===
July 13

Rank	Nation	Competitors	Time	Notes
1st place, gold medalist(s)	Brazil	Geisa Coutinho, Emmily Pinheiro, Sheila Ferreira, Jailma Lima	3:34.16	
2nd place, silver medalist(s)	Portugal	Vera Barbosa, Patrícia Lopes, Joceline Monteiro, Maria Carmo Tavares	3:37.90	
3rd place, bronze medalist(s)	São Tomé and Príncipe	Glória Santo, Lecabela Quaresma, Celma Bonfim, Ludmila Leal	4:06.14	NR

=== High jump ===
July 12

Rank	Name	Nationality	1.64	1.70	1.74	1.78	1.81	1.84	Result	Notes
1st place, gold medalist(s)	~~Lucimara da Silva~~	~~Brazil~~	o	o	o	xo	o	xxx	~~1.81~~	DQ
2nd place, silver medalist(s)	Mônica de Freitas	Brazil	–	o	o	xxo	xxx		1.78	
3rd place, bronze medalist(s)	Marisa Anselmo	Portugal	–	xxo	xxx				1.74	
4	Liliana Viana	Portugal	o	xxx					1.64	

=== Long jump ===
July 12

Rank	Name	Nationality	#1	#2	#3	#4	#5	#6	Result	Notes
1st place, gold medalist(s)	Naide Gomes	Portugal	6.74w	4.31w	6.39	x	x	5.06	6.74w	
2nd place, silver medalist(s)	Keila Costa	Brazil	6.54w	6.49w	6.71w	-	6.60	x	6.71w	
3rd place, bronze medalist(s)	~~Fernanda Gonçalves~~	~~Brazil~~	~~x~~	~~x~~	~~6.14w~~	~~x~~	~~6.20~~	~~x~~	~~6.20~~	DQ
4	Chamila Nuwanage	Sri Lanka	5.23w	5.63	5.94w	5.61w	5.69w	5.96	5.96	
5	Ungndi Quiwacana	Portugal	5.83w	x	5.88w	5.79w	x	4.95w	5.88w	

=== Triple jump ===
July 13

Rank	Name	Nationality	#1	#2	#3	#4	#5	#6	Result	Notes
1st place, gold medalist(s)	Patrícia Mamona	Portugal	12.95w	13.79w	x	13.53	13.43	13.43	13.79w	
2nd place, silver medalist(s)	~~Fernanda Gonçalves~~	~~Brazil~~	~~13.30~~	~~x~~	~~x~~	~~13.11~~	~~x~~	~~13.41~~	~~13.41~~	DQ
3rd place, bronze medalist(s)	Tânia da Silva	Brazil	13.15w	x	x	13.13	13.15	13.23	13.23	
4	Lecabela Quaresma	São Tomé and Príncipe	13.04w	13.07	x	12.47	x	11.86	13.07	
5	Januária Pereira	Portugal	12.32	12.22w	12.75	x	12.43	12.45	12.75	

=== Shot put ===
July 13

Rank	Name	Nationality	#1	#2	#3	#4	#5	#6	Result	Notes
1st place, gold medalist(s)	Elisângela Adriano	Brazil	16.68	17.02	x	16.46	x	x	17.02	
2nd place, silver medalist(s)	Andréa Maria Britto	Brazil	x	16.15	15.90	x	15.98	16.26	16.26	
3rd place, bronze medalist(s)	Maria Antónia Borges	Portugal	15.24	x	x	x	15.14	x	15.24	
4	Vanda Rodrigues	Portugal	13.73	x	x	x	x	x	13.73	
5	Steffi Cardozo	India	12.85	12.75	12.56	x	12.90	12.61	12.90	
6	Cheila Miranda	Cape Verde	9.48	9.02	9.27	8.78	7.88	8.32	9.48	
7	Vânia Lima	Cape Verde	7.38	6.53	x	6.87	6.86	6.23	7.38	
