= 2021 European Athletics U23 Championships – Women's javelin throw =

Women's javelin throw at the 2021 European Athletics U23 Championships
- Venue: Kadriorg Stadium, Tallinn
- Dates: 9, 11 July
- Competitors: 23 from 16 nations
- Winning distance: 59.14

Medalists
gold medal	Aliaksandra Konshyna	Belarus
silver medal	Münevver Hancı	Turkey
bronze medal	Jöna Aigouy	France

The women's javelin throw event at the 2021 European Athletics U23 Championships was held in Tallinn, Estonia, at Kadriorg Stadium on 9 and 11 July.

== Records ==
Prior to the competition, the records were as follows:

European U23 record	Sara Kolak (CRO)	68.43	Lausanne, Switzerland	6 July 2017
Championship U23 record	Christin Hussong (GER)	65.60	Tallinn, Estonia	11 July 2015

== Results ==
=== Qualification ===
Qualification rule: 56.00 (Q) or the 12 best results (q) qualified for the final.

Rank	Group	Name	Nationality	#1	#2	#3	Results	Notes
1	B	Julia Ulbricht	Germany	54.02	55.77	x	55.77	q, PB
2	A	Rebekah Walton	Great Britain	54.27	47.35	–	54.27	q, PB
3	B	Jöna Aigouy	France	53.91	53.15	54.05	54.05	q
4	A	Sara Zabarino	Italy	52.60	54.01	53.57	54.01	q
5	A	Patricia Madl	Austria	52.52	50.91	53.77	53.77	q
6	B	Elina Kinnunen	Finland	53.73	49.14	x	53.73	q
7	B	Aliaksandra Konshyna	Belarus	53.72	51.84	x	53.72	q
8	B	Julia Valtanen	Finland	51.24	53.54	x	53.54	q
9	B	Hanna Kalinouskaya	Belarus	53.27	50.10	49.89	53.27	q
10	A	Münevver Hancı	Turkey	x	52.77	52.09	52.77	q
11	A	Roosa Ylönen	Finland	52.28	45.29	51.77	52.28	q
12	A	Karyna Butkevich	Belarus	44.70	52.00	51.01	52.00	q
13	B	Mirta Kulisic	Croatia	51.77	48.36	x	51.77	
14	B	Ioanna Malli	Greece	x	50.64	48.56	50.64	
15	B	Carolina Visca	Italy	49.29	x	49.95	49.95	
16	A	Emanuela Casadei	Italy	x	44.53	49.84	49.84	
17	A	Alina Shukh	Ukraine	49.64	49.61	47.24	49.64	
18	A	Ivana Koktavá	Czech Republic	46.60	48.93	49.62	49.62	
19	B	Małgorzata Maślak	Poland	48.66	x	x	48.66	
20	A	Melpomeni Grigoriadou	Greece	48.60	48.01	46.56	48.60	
21	B	Gedly Tugi	Estonia	47.78	x	x	47.78	
22	B	Liv Cantby	Denmark	47.72	45.63	47.27	47.72	
23	A	Fanni Máté	Hungary	46.65	46.82	45.96	46.82	

=== Final ===
Rank	Name	Nationality	#1	#2	#3	#4	#5	#6	Result	Notes
1st place, gold medalist(s)	Aliaksandra Konshyna	Belarus	53.13	53.22	59.14	56.18	53.67	53.79	59.14	PB
2nd place, silver medalist(s)	Münevver Hancı	Turkey	57.37	54.38	x	x	52.99	55.35	57.37	
3rd place, bronze medalist(s)	Jöna Aigouy	France	55.82	55.08	x	53.19	53.13	53.34	55.82	
4	Hanna Kalinouskaya	Belarus	47.49	49.38	52.49	x	53.91	45.97	53.91	
5	Rebekah Walton	Great Britain	53.46	50.81	x	x	50.28	47.98	53.46	
6	Patricia Madl	Austria	49.16	x	52.35	53.32	x	51.47	53.32	
7	Julia Ulbricht	Germany	51.63	x	53.27	x	x	x	53.27	
8	Julia Valtanen	Finland	47.39	48.16	52.92	x	x	48.93	52.92	
9	Sara Zabarino	Italy	47.60	52.01	50.80				52.01	
10	Elina Kinnunen	Finland	46.13	x	50.18				50.18	
11	Karyna Butkevich	Belarus	47.74	47.20	47.48				47.74	
12	Roosa Ylönen	Finland	47.71	46.99	46.87				47.71	
