= 2004 African Championships in Athletics – Women's 3000 metres steeplechase =

The women's 3000 metres steeplechase event at the 2004 African Championships in Athletics was held in Brazzaville, Republic of the Congo on July 16. This marked the first time that this event was held for women at the African Championships.

== Results ==
Rank	Name	Nationality	Time	Notes
1st place, gold medalist(s)	Bouchra Chaâbi	Morocco	9:53.46	
2nd place, silver medalist(s)	Nawal Baiby	Morocco	10:11.42	
3rd place, bronze medalist(s)	Tebogo Masehla	South Africa	10:34.40	
4	Celma Bonfim	São Tomé and Príncipe	11:57.94	NR
