= Athletics Federation of São Tomé and Príncipe =

Governing body of athletics in São Tomé and Príncipe

- Sport: Athletics
- Founded: 1980
- Affiliation: IAAF
- Affiliation date: 1981
- Regional affiliation: CAA
- President: António Menezes
- Secretary: Filipe Andrade Gomes
- (São Tomé and Príncipe)

The Athletics Federation of São Tomé and Príncipe (Federação Santomense de Atletismo) is the governing body for the sport of athletics in São Tomé and Príncipe. Current president is António Menezes.

== History ==
The Federação Santomense de Atletismo was founded in 1980, and was affiliated to the IAAF in the year 1981.

== Affiliations ==
- International Association of Athletics Federations (IAAF)
- Confederation of African Athletics (CAA)
- Asociación Iberoamericana de Atletismo (AIA; Ibero-American Athletics Association)

Moreover, it is part of the following national organisations:

- National Olympic Committee for São Tomé and Príncipe (Portuguese: Comité Olímpico de São Tomé e Príncipe)

== National records ==
The Federação Santomense de Atletismo maintains the national records.
