= 2018 IAAF World U20 Championships – Women's javelin throw =

Women's javelin throw at the 2018 World U20 Championships
- Venue: Ratina Stadium
- Dates: 10 July (qualification); 11 July (final)
- Competitors: 24 from 18 nations
- Winning distance: 55.95 m

Medalists
gold medal	Alina Shukh	Ukraine
silver medal	Tomoka Kuwazoe	Japan
bronze medal	Dana Baker	United States

The women's javelin throw (weigh 600 grams as senior level) at the 2018 IAAF World U20 Championships was held at Ratina Stadium on 10 and 11 July.

== Records ==
Standing records prior to the 2018 IAAF World U20 Championships in Athletics
World U20 Record	Yulenmis Aguilar (CUB)	63.86	Edmonton, Canada	2 August 2015
Championship Record	Vera Rebrik (UKR)	63.01	Bydgoszcz, Poland	10 July 2008
World U20 Leading	Tomoka Kuwazoe (JPN)	56.86	Hiratsuka, Japan	15 June 2018

== Results ==
=== Qualification ===
The qualification round took place on 10 July, in two groups, with Group A starting at 09:00 and Group B starting at 10:20. Athletes attaining a mark of at least 53.50 metres( Q ) or at least the 12 best performers ( q ) qualified for the final. The overall results were as follows:

Rank	Group	Name	Nationality	Round			Mark	Notes
Rank	Group	Name	Nationality	1	2	3	Mark	Notes
1	A	Sara Zabarino	Italy	51.81	51.18	53.99	53.99	Q, PB
2	B	Carolina Visca	Italy	48.47	53.05	53.49	53.49	q
3	A	Juleisy Angulo	Ecuador	52.62	x	49.97	52.62	q
4	A	Tomoka Kuwazoe	Japan	48.45	52.04	48.64	52.04	q
5	B	Alina Shukh	Ukraine	43.74	51.76	49.43	51.76	q
6	A	Münevver Hancı	Turkey	47.85	49.33	51.25	51.25	q
7	B	Dana Baker	United States	50.03	51.09	46.86	51.09	q
8	B	Li Hui-jun	Chinese Taipei	46.92	47.77	50.95	50.95	q
9	A	Zoja Šušteršic	Slovenia	50.64	50.36	50.83	50.83	q
10	B	Elina Kinnunen	Finland	45.47	50.23	47.48	50.23	q
11	B	Fabielle Ferreira	Brazil	50.16	48.81	48.67	50.16	q
12	A	Dai Qianqian	China	49.81	47.29	x	49.81	q
13	A	Roosa Ylönen	Finland	49.64	x	44.15	49.64	
14	A	Maura Fiamoncini	United States	48.91	x	45.36	48.91	
15	B	Sae Takemoto	Japan	48.80	47.94	46.94	48.80	
16	B	Jona Aigouy	France	45.98	48.67	45.38	48.67	
17	B	Talena Murray	Trinidad and Tobago	41.98	48.36	43.85	48.36	
18	A	Julia Ulbricht	Germany	47.00	x	47.88	47.88	
19	B	Keira McCarrell	Canada	44.63	x	47.85	47.85	
20	A	Oleksandra Zarytska	Ukraine	42.91	41.74	47.59	47.59	
21	B	Lara Ilievski	Australia	x	43.14	45.34	45.34	
22	A	Alexandra Roberts	Australia	39.84	42.48	45.04	45.04	
23	A	Joanna Hajdrowska	Poland	44.58	x	43.19	44.58	
24	B	Fanni Máté	Hungary	43.26	x	43.44	43.44	

=== Final ===
The final was held on 11 July at 18:50.

Rank	Name	Nationality	Round						Mark	Notes
Rank	Name	Nationality	1	2	3	4	5	6	Mark	Notes
1st place, gold medalist(s)	Alina Shukh	Ukraine	53.42	54.53	55.95	53.29	x	−	55.95	SB
2nd place, silver medalist(s)	Tomoka Kuwazoe	Japan	48.39	49.31	55.66	54.35	51.98	43.58	55.66	
3rd place, bronze medalist(s)	Dana Baker	United States	51.85	55.04	53.13	51.70	x	52.90	55.04	PB
4	Carolina Visca	Italy	52.35	x	53.75	x	x	53.84	53.84	
5	Sara Zabarino	Italy	51.43	52.98	50.24	50.00	50.23	51.21	52.98	
6	Dai Qianqian	China	49.29	47.35	52.95	50.66	x	49.07	52.95	
7	Elina Kinnunen	Finland	50.78	50.75	52.50	51.88	51.25	52.40	52.50	SB
8	Li Hui-jun	Chinese Taipei	48.62	51.49	49.78	47.19	50.78	49.07	51.49	
9	Zoja Šušteršic	Slovenia	47.39	50.59	50.00				50.59	
10	Fabielle Ferreira	Brazil	50.05	x	49.26				50.05	
11	Münevver Hancı	Turkey	46.51	47.89	48.97				48.97	
12	Juleisy Angulo	Ecuador	45.85	x	46.44				46.44	
