= 2017 European Athletics Indoor Championships – Women's pentathlon =

The women's pentathlon event at the 2017 European Athletics Indoor Championships was held on March 3, 2017.

== Medalists ==
Gold	Silver	Bronze
Nafissatou Thiam; Belgium	Ivona Dadic; Austria	Györgyi Zsivoczky-Farkas; Hungary

== Records ==
Standing records prior to the 2017 European Athletics Indoor Championships
World record	Natallia Dobrynska (UKR)	5013	Istanbul, Turkey	9 March 2012
European record	Natallia Dobrynska (UKR)	5013	Istanbul, Turkey	9 March 2012
Championship record	Katarina Johnson-Thompson (GBR)	5000	Prague, Czech Republic	6 March 2015
World Leading	Alina Shukh (UKR)	4550	Zaporizhia, Ukraine	27 January 2017
European Leading	Alina Shukh (UKR)	4550	Zaporizhia, Ukraine	27 January 2017

== Results ==
=== 60 metres hurdles ===
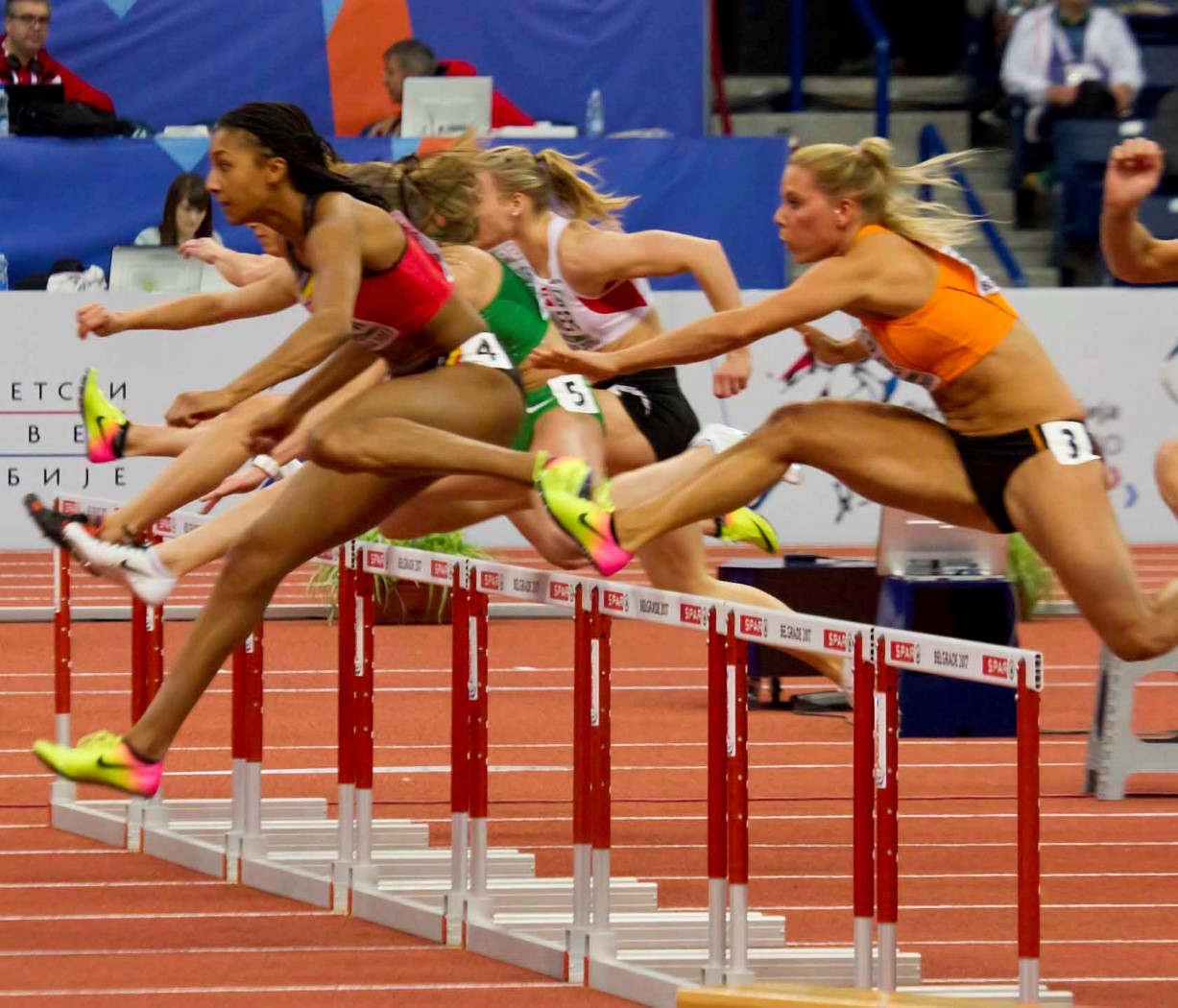
Heat 2

Rank	Heat	Lane	Athlete	Nationality	Time	Notes	Points
1	2	4	Nafissatou Thiam	Belgium	8.23	PB	1077
2	2	5	Xénia Krizsán	Hungary	8.30	PB	1061
3	2	6	Esther Turpin	France	8.34	PB	1052
4	2	3	Nadine Broersen	Netherlands	8.42		1035
5	2	2	Ivona Dadic	Austria	8.45	PB	1028
6	2	7	Verena Preiner	Austria	8.45		1028
7	2	8	Györgyi Zsivoczky-Farkas	Hungary	8.47	SB	1024
8	1	6	Lecabela Quaresma	Portugal	8.52	SB	1013
9	1	5	Lucia Slaničková	Slovakia	8.60	PB	995
10	2	1	Caroline Agnou	Switzerland	8.61		993
11	1	3	Laura Arteil	France	8.75		963
12	1	7	Yana Maksimava	Belarus	8.85		941
13	1	2	Bianca Salming	Sweden	8.87		937
14	1	8	Alina Shukh	Ukraine	8.99		912
	1	4	Hanna Haradskaya	Belarus	DQ		0

=== High jump ===
Rank	Athlete	Nationality	1.57	1.60	1.63	1.66	1.69	1.72	1.75	1.78	1.81	1.84	1.87	1.90	1.93	1.96	1.99	Result	Points	Notes	Total
1	Nafissatou Thiam	Belgium	–	–	–	–	–	–	–	–	–	o	o	xo	o	xo	xxx	1.96	1184	CR	2261
2	Yana Maksimava	Belarus	–	–	–	–	–	o	o	o	o	xxo	xxo	xxx				1.87	1067		2008
3	Ivona Dadic	Austria	–	–	–	o	o	xo	xo	xo	xxo	xo	xxo	xxx				1.87	1067	PB	2095
4	Alina Shukh	Ukraine	–	–	–	–	–	–	xo	o	xo	xo	xxx					1.84	1029		1941
5	Bianca Salming	Sweden	–	–	–	–	–	–	o	o	o	xxx						1.81	991		1928
6	Györgyi Zsivoczky-Farkas	Hungary	–	–	–	o	o	o	o	o	xo	xxx						1.81	991	SB	2015
7	Hanna Haradskaya	Belarus	–	–	–	–	–	o	xo	xo	xo	xxx						1.81	991		991
8	Nadine Broersen	Netherlands	–	–	–	–	xo	o	xo	xo	xo	xxx						1.81	991	SB	2026
9	Xénia Krizsán	Hungary	–	–	o	xo	o	o	xo	o	xxo	xxx						1.81	991	PB	2052
10	Lucia Slaničková	Slovakia	–	o	o	o	o	o	o	o	xxx							1.78	953	PB	1948
11	Lecabela Quaresma	Portugal	–	xo	o	xo	o	o	xxo	xxo	xxx							1.78	953	PB	1966
12	Verena Preiner	Austria	o	o	o	o	o	xo	xxx									1.72	879		1907
13	Caroline Agnou	Switzerland	–	o	o	o	o	xxx										1.69	842		1835
14	Esther Turpin	France	o	o	o	xxo	xo	xxx										1.69	842		1894
15	Laura Arteil	France	o	o	o	xxx												1.63	771		1734

=== Shot put ===
Rank	Athlete	Nationality	#1	#2	#3	Result	Notes	Points	Total
1	Nafissatou Thiam	Belgium	14.11	15.29	14.62	15.29		880	3141
2	Györgyi Zsivoczky-Farkas	Hungary	14.95	14.28	14.92	14.95	PB	858	2873
3	Nadine Broersen	Netherlands	14.59	14.59	x	14.59		833	2859
4	Laura Arteil	France	13.71	13.82	14.46	14.46	PB	825	2559
5	Lecabela Quaresma	Portugal	14.25	13.93	13.76	14.25		811	2777
6	Xénia Krizsán	Hungary	14.24	13.59	14.16	14.24		810	2862
7	Verena Preiner	Austria	13.67	14.14	13.90	14.14		803	2710
8	Yana Maksimava	Belarus	13.98	13.83	14.01	14.01		795	2803
9	Ivona Dadic	Austria	13.81	13.93	13.78	13.93	PB	789	2884
10	Bianca Salming	Sweden	13.30	13.59	x	13.59		767	2695
11	Caroline Agnou	Switzerland	13.22	13.38	12.83	13.38		753	2588
12	Alina Shukh	Ukraine	x	13.22	13.13	13.22		742	2683
13	Hanna Haradskaya	Belarus	11.44	13.12	x	13.12		735	1726
14	Esther Turpin	France	12.14	x	11.53	12.14		670	2564
15	Lucia Slaničková	Slovakia	10.34	11.30	10.68	11.30	PB	615	2563

=== Long jump ===
Rank	Athlete	Nationality	#1	#2	#3	Result	Notes	Points	Total
1	Ivona Dadic	Austria	5.98	6.41	6.38	6.41	PB	978	3862
2	Györgyi Zsivoczky-Farkas	Hungary	6.06	6.12	6.38	6.38	PB	969	3842
3	Nafissatou Thiam	Belgium	6.23	6.37	6.23	6.37	SB	965	4106
4	Lucia Slaničková	Slovakia	6.35	5.78	6.27	6.35	PB	959	3522
5	Nadine Broersen	Netherlands	6.03	x	6.19	6.19	SB	908	3767
6	Laura Arteil	France	5.98	5.98	6.14	6.14	PB	893	3452
7	Xénia Krizsán	Hungary	5.96	6.09	6.04	6.09		877	3739
8	Alina Shukh	Ukraine	x	5.90	5.88	5.90		819	3502
9	Esther Turpin	France	5.84	5.88	x	5.88		813	3377
10	Verena Preiner	Austria	5.86	5.79	5.63	5.86		807	3517
11	Caroline Agnou	Switzerland	5.64	5.84	5.85	5.85		804	3392
12	Lecabela Quaresma	Portugal	x	5.77	5.82	5.82		795	3572
13	Yana Maksimava	Belarus	5.62	x	5.69	5.69		756	3559
14	Bianca Salming	Sweden	x	5.67	x	5.67		750	3445
15	Hanna Haradskaya	Belarus	5.54	5.37	5.44	5.54		712	2438

=== 800 metres ===
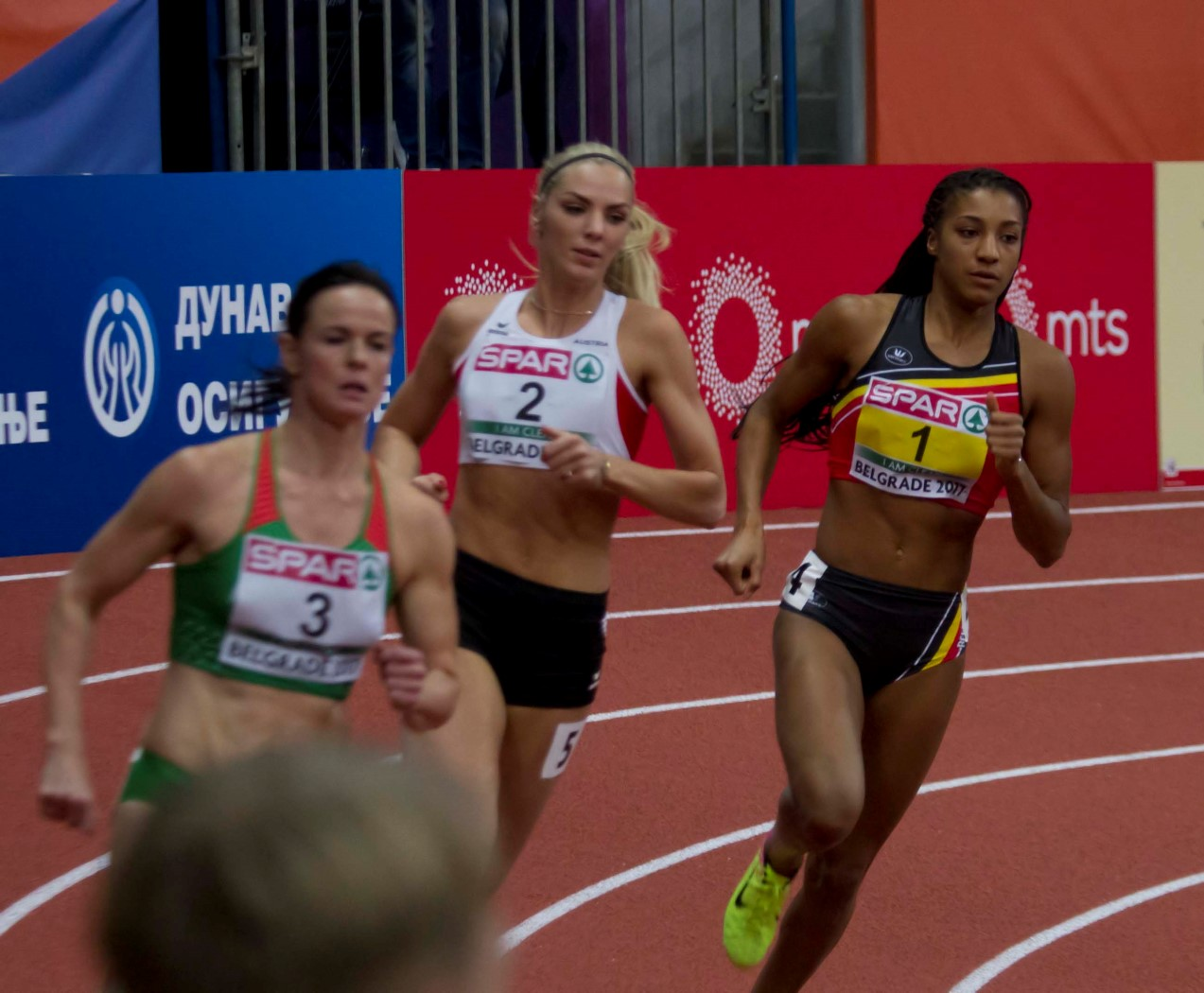
Heat 2

Rank	Heat	Athlete	Nationality	Time	Note	Points
1	1	Verena Preiner	Austria	2:10.26	PB	961
2	1	Bianca Salming	Sweden	2:11.44	PB	944
3	2	Ivona Dadic	Austria	2:14.13		905
4	2	Xénia Krizsán	Hungary	2:15.08	PB	892
5	1	Lucia Slaničková	Slovakia	2:15.40	PB	887
6	2	Györgyi Zsivoczky-Farkas	Hungary	2:15.86		881
7	2	Yana Maksimava	Belarus	2:16.00	SB	879
8	1	Alina Shukh	Ukraine	2:16.29	PB	875
9	2	Lecabela Quaresma	Portugal	2:16.49	PB	872
10	1	Laura Arteil	France	2:18.11	PB	849
11	2	Nadine Broersen	Netherlands	2:20.63		815
12	1	Caroline Agnou	Switzerland	2:23.44		777
13	1	Esther Turpin	France	2:24.29		766
14	2	Nafissatou Thiam	Belgium	2:24.44		764
15	1	Hanna Haradskaya	Belarus	2:25.26		753

== Final standings ==
Rank	Athlete	Nationality	Points	Note
1st place, gold medalist(s)	Nafissatou Thiam	Belgium	4870	WL
2nd place, silver medalist(s)	Ivona Dadic	Austria	4767	NR
3rd place, bronze medalist(s)	Györgyi Zsivoczky-Farkas	Hungary	4723	PB
4	Xénia Krizsán	Hungary	4631	PB
5	Nadine Broersen	Netherlands	4582	
6	Verena Preiner	Austria	4478	
7	Lecabela Quaresma	Portugal	4444	
8	Yana Maksimava	Belarus	4438	
9	Lucia Slaničková	Slovakia	4409	NR
10	Bianca Salming	Sweden	4389	PB
11	Alina Shukh	Ukraine	4377	
12	Laura Arteil	France	4301	PB
13	Caroline Agnou	Switzerland	4169	
14	Esther Turpin	France	4143	
15	Hanna Haradskaya	Belarus	3191	
