= Carolina Visca =

Italian javelin thrower

Personal information
- National team: Italian Team
- Born: Carolina Giovanna Visca; 31 May 2000 (age 26) Rome, Italy
- Height: 1.69 m (5 ft 7 in)
- Weight: 65 kg (143 lb)

Sport
- Country: Italy
- Sport: Athletics
- Event: Javelin throw
- Club: G.S. Fiamme Gialle
- Coached by: Alberto Visca

Achievements and titles
- Personal best: Javelin throw: 58.47 m (2019)
Medal record
European U18 Championships
Silver medal – second place	2016 Tbilisi	Javelin throw
European U20 Championships
Gold medal – first place	2019 Borås	Javelin throw
Silver medal – second place	2017 Grosseto	Javelin throw

Carolina Visca (born 31 May 2000) is an Italian female javelin thrower, born in Rome from Italian father (that is also her coach) and Colombian mother. who won several medals at youth level (Under-18, Under-20, Under-23).

In September 2018 in Pescara she established her personal best with the measure of 57.93 m, which is a new Italian U20 record. Visca is part of the Berkley Track and Field team since January 2023.

== Biography ==
On 10 July 2018 she qualifies for the final of the javelin throw at the 2018 IAAF World U20 Championships in Tampere, with the second best measure among the participating athletes, behind teammate Sara Zabarino. Than in final was 4th, just over a meter from the bronze medal and all the first three girls launched a measure lower than her season best. On 21 July 2019 she was qualified for the final with the second measure behind Julia Ulbricht. In the final became first yet from the second throw but in the last throw she take definitely the gold medal at European U20 championships in Borås. After only 1 week she take the U20NR with 58,47 and win the competition of Italian senior championship in Brixen. She won the Italian National title in 2023.

== Achievements ==
Year	Competition	Venue	Position	Event	Measure	Notes
2015	European Youth Olympic Festival	(Georgia (country)) Tbilisi	1st	Javelin throw	60.09 m	CR
2016	European U18 Championships	(Georgia (country)) Tbilisi	2nd	Javelin throw	59.10 m	
2017	European U20 Championships	(Italy) Grosseto	2nd	Javelin throw	53.65 m	
2018	Mediterranean U23 Championships	(Italy) Jesolo	2nd	Javelin throw	52.25 m	
2019	European U20 Championships	(Sweden) Borås	1st	Javelin throw	56.48 m	

== Personal bests ==
- Javelin throw: 58.47 m – (Italy) Brixen, 28 July 2019

== See also ==
- Italian all-time lists - Javelin throw
