= 2006 African Championships in Athletics – Women's 3000 metres steeplechase =

The women's 3000 metres steeplechase event at the 2006 African Championships in Athletics was held at the Stade Germain Comarmond in Mauritius on August 11, 2006.

== Results ==
Rank	Name	Nationality	Time	Notes
1st place, gold medalist(s)	Jeruto Kiptum	Kenya	10:00.02	
2nd place, silver medalist(s)	Habiba Ghribi	Tunisia	10:10.93	
3rd place, bronze medalist(s)	Bouchra Chaâbi	Morocco	10:11.52	
4	Netsanet Achamo	Ethiopia	10:17.89	
5	Hanane Ouhaddou	Morocco	10:18.38	
6	Tebogo Masehla	South Africa	10:19.30	
7	Beatrice Kibor	Kenya	10:33.02	
8	Nolene Conrad	South Africa	10:39.75	
	Dorcus Inzikuru	Uganda	DNS	
