= Ivona Dadic =

Austrian track and field athlete (born 1993)

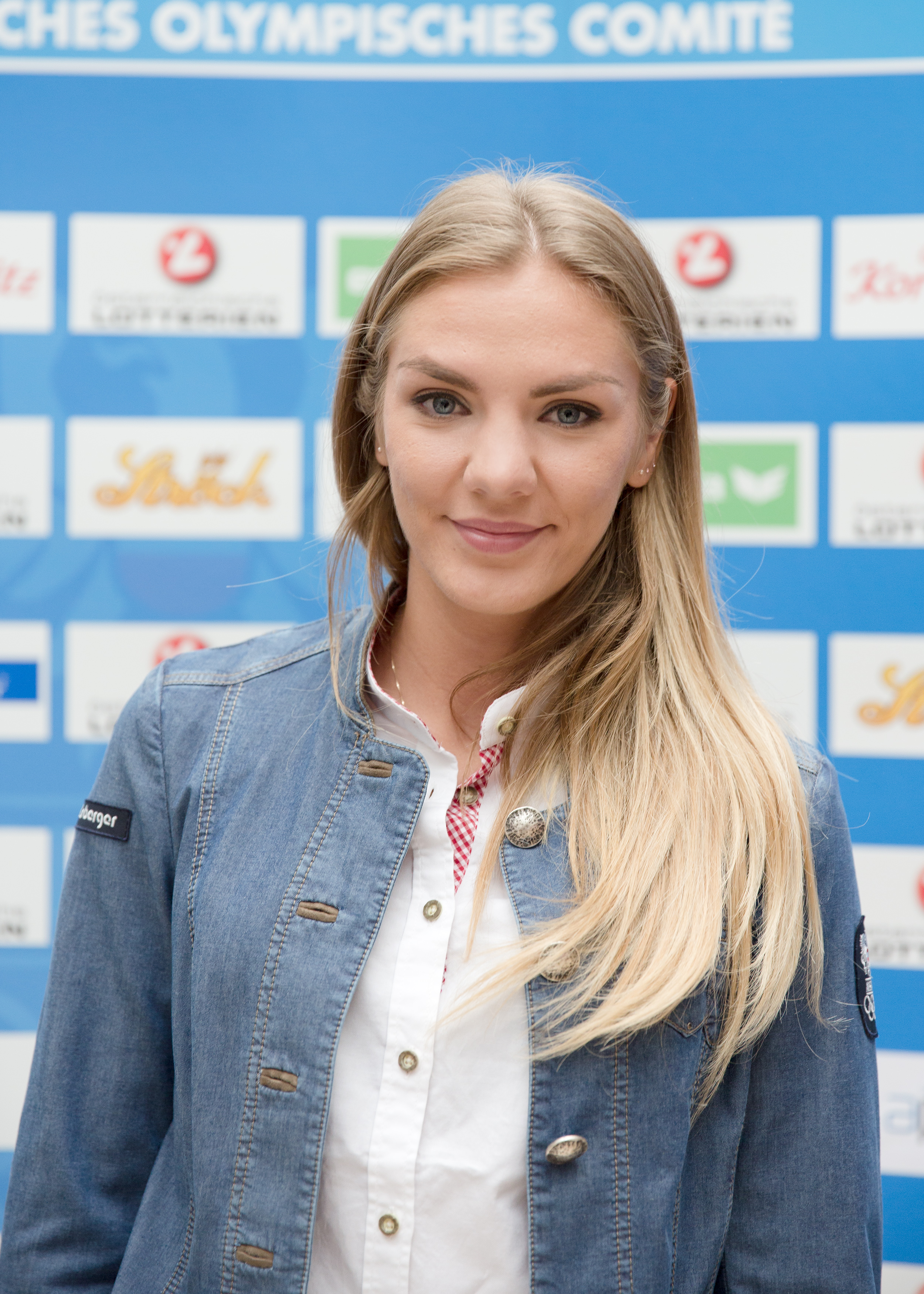
- Ivona Dadic (2016)

Personal information
- Nationality: Austrian
- Born: 29 December 1993 (age 32) Wels, Austria
- Height: 1.79 m (5 ft 10 in)
- Weight: 64 kg (141 lb)

Sport
- Country: Austria
- Sport: Athletics
- Event: Heptathlon
Medal record
Women's athletics
Representing Austria
World Indoor Championships
| Silver medal – second place | 2018 Birmingham | Pentathlon |
European Championships
| Bronze medal – third place | 2016 Amsterdam | Heptathlon |
European Indoor Championships
| Silver medal – second place | 2017 Belgrade | Pentathlon |
European U23 Championships
| Bronze medal – third place | 2015 Tallinn | Heptathlon |
- Updated on 2 March 2018

Ivona Dadic (born 29 December 1993) is an Austrian track and field athlete of Croatian descent. She competed at the 2012 Summer Olympics in the women's heptathlon event. At the 2020 Summer Olympics she finished 8th.

== Early life and career ==
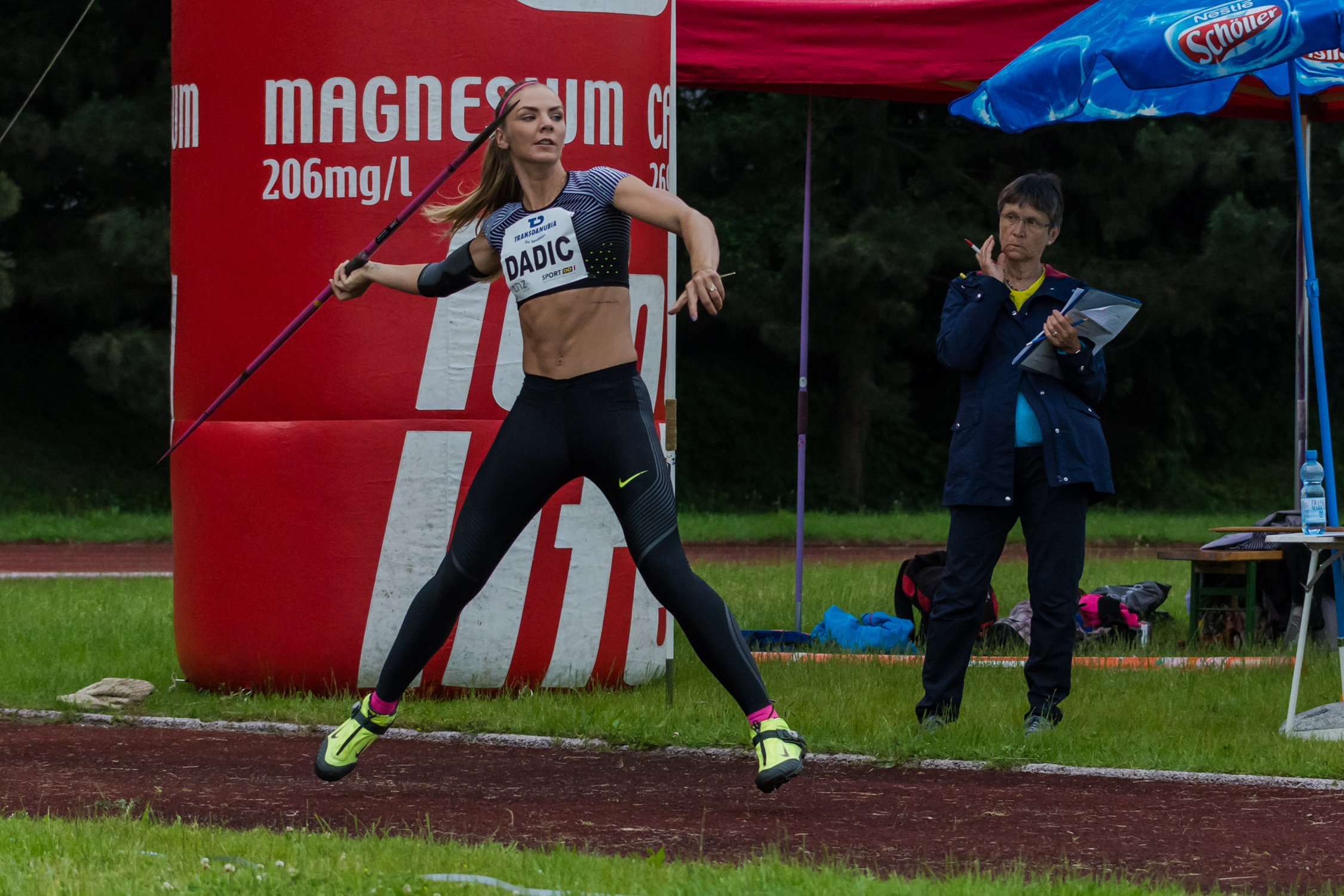
Ivona Dadic (Linz, 2016)

Ivona Dadić was born on 29 December 1993 in Wels, Austria to Nine and Danica Dadić, who are from Bugojno, Bosnia and Herzegovina. Dadić was raised as a Roman Catholic. At the age of nine she won her first competition. Her brother Ivan died in 2008 in car accident so she has a tattooed cross on her left hand with his name. In 2015 Dadić won a bronze medal at the 2015 European U23 Championships with 6033 points. One year later she won a bronze medal at the 2016 Amsterdam with 6408 points.

Dadić competed at the 2012 Olympic Games in London. She achieved three personal bests—in long jump, javelin, and the 800 meter—finishing 25th overall.

== Awards ==
- Večernjakova domovnica (Večernji list) - Best Sportswoman in Croatian diaspora

== Competition record ==
| Year | Competition | Venue | Position | Event | Notes |
Representing Austria
| 2011 | European Junior Championships | Tallinn, Estonia | 10th | Heptathlon | 5455 pts |
| 2012 | Summer Olympics | London, United Kingdom | 25th | Heptathlon | 5935 pts |
| 2013 | European U23 Championships | Tampere, Finland | 5th | Heptathlon | 5874 pts |
| 2015 | European U23 Championships | Tallinn, Estonia | 3rd | Heptathlon | 6033 pts (NR) |
| 2016 | European Championships | Amsterdam, The Netherlands | 3rd | Heptathlon | 6408 pts (NR) |
| 2016 | Olympic Games | Rio de Janeiro, Brazil | 21st | Heptathlon | 6155 pts |
| 2017 | European Indoor Championships | Belgrade, Serbia | 2nd | Pentathlon | 4767 pts (NR) |
| 2017 | World Championships | London, United Kingdom | 6th | Heptathlon | 6417 pts (NR) |
| 2018 | World Indoor Championships | Birmingham, United Kingdom | 2nd | Pentathlon | 4700 pts |
| 2018 | European Championships | Berlin, Germany | 4th | Heptathlon | 6552 pts |
| 2019 | European Indoor Championships | Glasgow, United Kingdom | 4th | Pentathlon | 4702 pts |
| 2019 | World Championships | Doha, Qatar | – | Heptathlon | DNF |
| 2021 | European Indoor Championships | Toruń, Poland | 4th | Pentathlon | 4587 pts |
| 2021 | Olympic Games | Tokyo, Japan | 8th | Heptathlon | 6403 pts |
| 2022 | European Championships | Munich, Germany | – | Heptathlon | DNF |

== Personal bests ==
Outdoor

- 200 m: 23.69 (July 2017)
- 800 m: 2:10.67 (May 2012)
- 100 m hurdles: 13.83 (July 2016)
- High jump: 1.83 (July 2017)
- Long jump: 6.49 (June 2016)
- Shot put: 14.44 (July 2017)
- Javelin throw: 52.48 (September 2015)
- Heptathlon: 6408 (July 2016) NR

Indoor

- 800 m: 2:13.15 (February 2018)
- 60 m hurdles: 8.32 (March 2018)
- High jump: 1.87 (March 2017)
- Long jump: 6.41 (March 2017)
- Shot put: 14.27 (March 2018)
- Pentathlon: 4767 (March 2017) NR

Awards
| Preceded by Vanessa Herzog | Austrian Sportswoman of the year 2020 | Succeeded by Anna Kiesenhofer |
