= 2021 European Athletics Indoor Championships – Women's pentathlon =

The women's pentathlon event at the 2021 European Athletics Indoor Championships was held on 5 March 2021.

== Medalists ==
Gold	Silver	Bronze
Nafissatou Thiam; Belgium	Noor Vidts; Belgium	Xénia Krizsán; Hungary

== Records ==
Standing records prior to the 2021 European Athletics Indoor Championships
World record	Natallia Dobrynska (UKR)	5013	Istanbul, Turkey	9 March 2012
European record	Natallia Dobrynska (UKR)	5013	Istanbul, Turkey	9 March 2012
Championship record	Katarina Johnson-Thompson (GBR)	5000	Prague, Czech Republic	6 March 2015
World Leading	Noor Vidts (BEL)	4665	Aubière, France	24 January 2021
European Leading	Noor Vidts (BEL)	4665	Aubière, France	24 January 2021

== Results ==
=== 60 metres hurdles ===
Rank	Heat	Lane	Athlete	Nationality	Time	Notes	Points
1	2	8	Holly Mills	Great Britain	8.22		1079
2	2	5	Annik Kälin	Switzerland	8.23		1077
3	2	4	Xénia Krizsán	Hungary	8.27	PB	1068
4	2	6	Noor Vidts	Belgium	8.27	PB	1068
5	1	5	Nafissatou Thiam	Belgium	8.31	SB	1059
6	2	3	María Vicente	Spain	8.31		1059
7	1	7	Ivona Dadic	Austria	8.38	SB	1044
8	1	3	Rita Nemes	Hungary	8.47		1024
9	1	6	Nadine Broersen	Netherlands	8.48		1021
10	1	4	Adrianna Sułek	Poland	8.51		1015
11	2	7	Célia Perron	France	8.57		1002
12	1	8	Paulina Ligarska	Poland	8.67		980

=== High jump ===
Rank	Athlete	Nationality	1.65	1.68	1.71	1.74	1.77	1.80	1.83	1.86	1.89	1.92	Result	Points	Note	Total
1	Nafissatou Thiam	Belgium	–	–	–	–	–	o	–	xo	xo	xxx	1.89	1093	SB	2152
2	Noor Vidts	Belgium	–	o	o	xo	o	xxo	o	xxx			1.83	1016	SB	2084
3	Paulina Ligarska	Poland	–	o	o	o	o	xo	xxx				1.80	978	=PB	1958
4	Adrianna Sułek	Poland	–	o	o	o	o	xxx					1.77	941		1956
5	Rita Nemes	Hungary	o	o	o	xo	o	xxx					1.77	941		1965
5	María Vicente	Spain	o	o	o	xo	o	xxx					1.77	941	SB	2000
7	Xénia Krizsán	Hungary	o	o	o	o	xo	xxr					1.77	941	SB	2009
8	Nadine Broersen	Netherlands	–	–	–	xo	xo	xxx					1.77	941		1962
9	Ivona Dadic	Austria	–	xxo	o	o	xxo	xxx					1.77	941	SB	1985
10	Holly Mills	Great Britain	o	o	xo	xo	xxx						1.74	903	SB	1982
11	Célia Perron	France	–	o	xo	xxx							1.71	867		1869
–	Annik Kälin	Switzerland	did not start													

=== Shot put ===
Rank	Athlete	Nationality	#1	#2	#3	Result	Points	Note	Total
1	Nafissatou Thiam	Belgium	14.17	15.16	15.06	15.16	872	SB	3024
2	Xénia Krizsán	Hungary	14.23	14.34	14.48	14.48	826	PB	2835
3	Nadine Broersen	Netherlands	13.93	14.04	x	14.04	797		2759
4	Noor Vidts	Belgium	12.64	13.45	13.83	13.83	783	SB	2867
5	Rita Nemes	Hungary	x	11.69	13.72	13.72	775		2740
6	Ivona Dadic	Austria	13.43	x	13.67	13.67	772		2757
7	Paulina Ligarska	Poland	13.05	13.59	11.41	13.59	767		2725
8	Holly Mills	Great Britain	12.45	13.22	12.60	13.22	742		2724
9	Adrianna Sułek	Poland	12.24	12.53	12.47	12.53	696		2652
10	María Vicente	Spain	11.55	12.35	12.40	12.40	688		2688
11	Célia Perron	France	11.17	11.22	11.73	11.73	643		2512
–	Annik Kälin	Switzerland	did not start						

=== Long jump ===
Rank	Athlete	Nationality	#1	#2	#3	Result	Points	Note	Total
1	Nafissatou Thiam	Belgium	x	6.60	6.54	6.60	1040	SB	4064
2	Noor Vidts	Belgium	6.47	6.33	4.39	6.47	997	PB	3864
3	Ivona Dadic	Austria	6.24	x	6.30	6.30	943	SB	3700
4	Célia Perron	France	5.71	6.15	5.91	6.15	896	=PB	3408
5	Paulina Ligarska	Poland	6.03	6.14	6.07	6.14	893	PB	3618
6	Holly Mills	Great Britain	6.10	6.09	6.08	6.10	880	PB	3604
7	Xénia Krizsán	Hungary	6.10	5.94	x	6.10	880	PB	3715
8	Rita Nemes	Hungary	5.97	x	x	5.97	840		3580
9	Adrianna Sułek	Poland	5.52	5.80	5.72	5.80	789		3441
–	Nadine Broersen	Netherlands	x	x	x	NM	0		2759
–	María Vicente	Spain	x	x	x	NM	0		2688
–	Annik Kälin	Switzerland	did not start						

=== 800 metres ===
Rank	Athlete	Nationality	Time	Notes	Points	Total
1	Xénia Krizsán	Hungary	2:12.49		929	4644
2	Noor Vidts	Belgium	2:12.59	PB	927	4791
3	Holly Mills	Great Britain	2:13.59		913	4517
4	Rita Nemes	Hungary	2:14.04		906	4486
5	Célia Perron	France	2:14.32		902	4310
6	Ivona Dadic	Austria	2:15.41	SB	887	4587
7	Paulina Ligarska	Poland	2:16.88	PB	866	4484
8	Nafissatou Thiam	Belgium	2:18.80	PB	840	4904
9	Nadine Broersen	Netherlands	2:21.97		797	3556
10	Adrianna Sułek	Poland	2:22.52		790	4231
	María Vicente	Spain	DNS		0	DNF

=== Final standings ===
The highest mark recorded in each event is highlighted in yellow

Rank	Athlete	Nationality	60mh	HJ	SP	LJ	800m	Total	Notes
1st place, gold medalist(s)	Nafissatou Thiam	Belgium	1059; 8.31	1093; 1.89	872; 15.16	1040; 6.60	840; 2:18.80	4904	WL, NR
2nd place, silver medalist(s)	Noor Vidts	Belgium	1068; 8.27	1016; 1.83	783; 13.83	997; 6.47	927; 2:12.59	4791	PB
3rd place, bronze medalist(s)	Xénia Krizsán	Hungary	1068; 8.27	941; 1.77	826; 14.48	880; 6.10	929; 2:12.49	4644	PB
4	Ivona Dadic	Austria	1044; 8.38	941; 1.77	772; 13.67	943; 6.30	887; 2:15.41	4587	SB
5	Holly Mills	Great Britain	1079; 8.22	903; 1.74	742; 13.22	880; 6.10	913; 2:13.59	4517	
6	Rita Nemes	Hungary	1024; 8.47	941; 1.77	775; 13.72	840; 5.97	906; 2:14.04	4486	
7	Paulina Ligarska	Poland	980; 8.67	978; 1.80	767; 13.59	893; 6.14	866; 2:16.88	4484	PB
8	Célia Perron	France	1002; 8.57	867; 1.71	643; 11.73	896; 6.15	902; 2:14.32	4310	
9	Adrianna Sułek	Poland	1015; 8.51	941; 1.77	696; 12.53	789; 5.80	790; 2:22.52	4231	
10	Nadine Broersen	Netherlands	1021; 8.48	941; 1.77	797; 14.04	0 NM	797; 2:21.97	3556	
	María Vicente	Spain	1059; 8.31	941; 1.77	688; 12.40	0 NM	DNS	DNF	
	Annik Kälin	Switzerland	1077; 8.23	DNS	DNS	DNS	DNS	DNF	
