= Bouchra Chaâbi =

Moroccan long-distance runner (born 1980)

Medal record

Women's athletics

Representing Morocco

African Championships
Gold medal – first place	2004 Brazzaville	3000 m st.
Bronze medal – third place	2000 Algiers	10,000 m
Bronze medal – third place	2006 Bambous	3000 m st.

Bouchra Chaabi (born 22 September 1980 in Bouguargouh) is a Moroccan long-distance runner who specializes in the 3000 metres steeplechase.

She made her Olympic debut at the 2000 Sydney Olympics, running in the 10,000 metres. That year she had been the bronze medallist in the event at the 2000 African Championships in Athletics. She made the top twenty in the short race at every IAAF World Cross Country Championships from 2002 to 2006. She also began to compete in the 3000 metres steeplechase and became continental champion with a gold medal victory at the 2004 African Championships in Athletics.

She won the Eurocross cross country running competition in 2004. Chaâbi went on to win a 5000 metres bronze medal at the 2004 Pan Arab Games later that year. She switched to the 3000 m steeplechase for the 2005 World Championships in Athletics and managed to finish tenth in the event final. That year, she was the 5000 m silver medallist at the 2005 Jeux de la Francophonie behind compatriot Zhor El Kamch. She took the steeplechase bronze medal at the 2006 African Championships in Athletics. She ran the 1500 metres at the 2007 World Championships in Athletics but was eliminated in the heats. She competed over the same distance for Morocco at the 2008 Summer Olympics, but did not progress past the first round yet again.

Her 2009 season was highlighted by a 5000 m gold medal and 10,000 m silver at the Jeux de la Francophonie. She managed second place at the 2010 Cross de la Constitución in December, finishing behind Mónica Rosa.

== Achievements ==
Year	Competition	Venue	Position	Event	Notes
Representing Morocco
2000	African Championships	Algiers, Algeria	3rd	10,000 m	34:08.79
2000	Olympic Games	Sydney, Australia	38th (q)	10,000 m	34:49.35
2002	African Championships	Radès, Tunisia	6th	5000 m	16:28.02
2004	African Championships	Brazzaville, Republic of the Congo	5th	1500 m	4:26.35
2004	African Championships	Brazzaville, Republic of the Congo	1st	3000 m st.	9:53.46
2004	Pan Arab Games	Algiers, Algeria	3rd	5000 m	16:21.17
2005	World Championships	Helsinki, Finland	10th	3000 m st.	9:47.62
2005	Jeux de la Francophonie	Niamey, Niger	2nd	5000 m	16:21.54
2006	African Championships	Bambous, Mauritius	3rd	3000 m st.	10:11.52
2007	Pan Arab Games	Cairo, Egypt	4th	1500 m	4:26.41
2007	Pan Arab Games	Cairo, Egypt	4th	5000 m	19:15.90
2009	Jeux de la Francophonie	Beirut, Lebanon	1st	5000 m	16:23.05
2009	Jeux de la Francophonie	Beirut, Lebanon	2nd	10,000 m	35:32.87

=== Personal bests ===
- 1500 metres – 4:03.62 min (2007)
- 3000 metres – 8:48.00 min (2006)
- 5000 metres – 15:21.32 min (2004)
- 10,000 metres – 32:17.7 min (2000)
- Half marathon – 1:17:45 hrs (2003)
- 3000 metres steeplechase – 9:30.35 min (2004)
