= Paulina Ligarska =

Polish athletics competitor

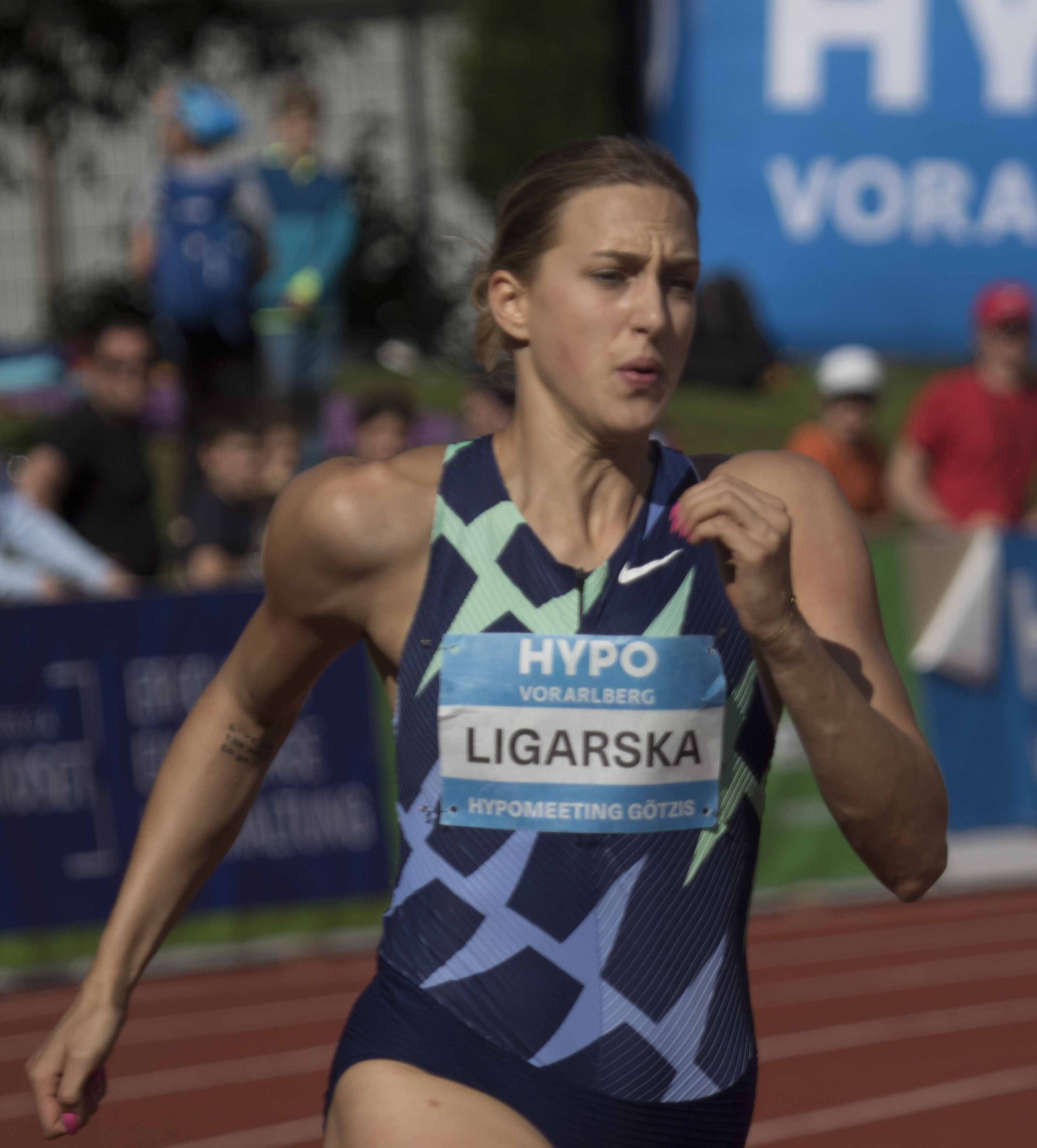

Personal information
- Born: 9 April 1996 (age 30) Kędzierzyn-Koźle, Poland

Sport
- Country: Poland
- Sport: Athletics
- Club: MMKS Kędzierzyn Koźle (2011–2012); LUKS Podium Kup (2013–2014); SKLA Sopot (od 2015)
- Coached by: Michał Modelski (2014–)

Paulina Ligarska (born 9 April 1996) is a Polish athlete competing in combined events. She represented her country at the 2022 World Championships finishing tenth.

== International competitions ==
Representing Poland
Year	Competition	Venue	Position	Event	Notes
2015	European Junior Championships	Eskilstuna, Sweden	8th	Heptathlon	5379 pts
2017	European U23 Championships	Bydgoszcz, Poland	10th	Heptathlon	5585 pts
2019	Universiade	Naples, Italy	6th	Heptathlon	5589 pts
2021	European Indoor Championships	Toruń, Poland	7th	Pentathlon	4484 pts
2022	World Championships	Eugene, United States	10th	Heptathlon	6093 pts
2022	European Championships	Munich, Germany	9th	Heptathlon	6090 pts
2023	World Championships	Budapest, Hungary	—	Heptathlon	DNF
2024	European Championships	Rome, Italy	12th	Heptathlon	6034 pts
2025	European Indoor Championships	Apeldoorn, Netherlands	5th	Pentathlon	4569 pts
2025	World Indoor Championships	Nanjing, China	13th	Pentathlon	3586 pts
2026	World Indoor Championships	Toruń, Poland	6th	Pentathlon	4557 pts

== Personal bests ==
Outdoor

- 200 metres – 24.65 (+1.5 m/s, Eugene 2022)
- 800 metres – 2:13.16 (Warsaw 2022)
- 100 metres hurdles – 13.93 (+1.9 m/s, Warsaw 2022)
- High jump – 1.83 (Grosseto 2022)
- Long jump – 6.10 (+0.6 m/s, Warsaw 2022)
- Shot put – 14.62 (Warsaw 2022)
- Javelin throw – 48.33 (Suwałki 2022)
- Heptathlon – 6241 (Warsaw 2022)

Indoor

- 800 metres – 2:13.85 (Toruń 2022)
- 60 metres hurdles – 8.62 (Toruń 2021)
- High jump – 1.86 (Toruń 2022)
- Long jump – 6.14 (Toruń 2021)
- Shot put – 14.35 (Spała 2021)
- Pentathlon – 4593 (Toruń 2022)
