= Caroline Agnou =

Swiss athlete (born 1996)

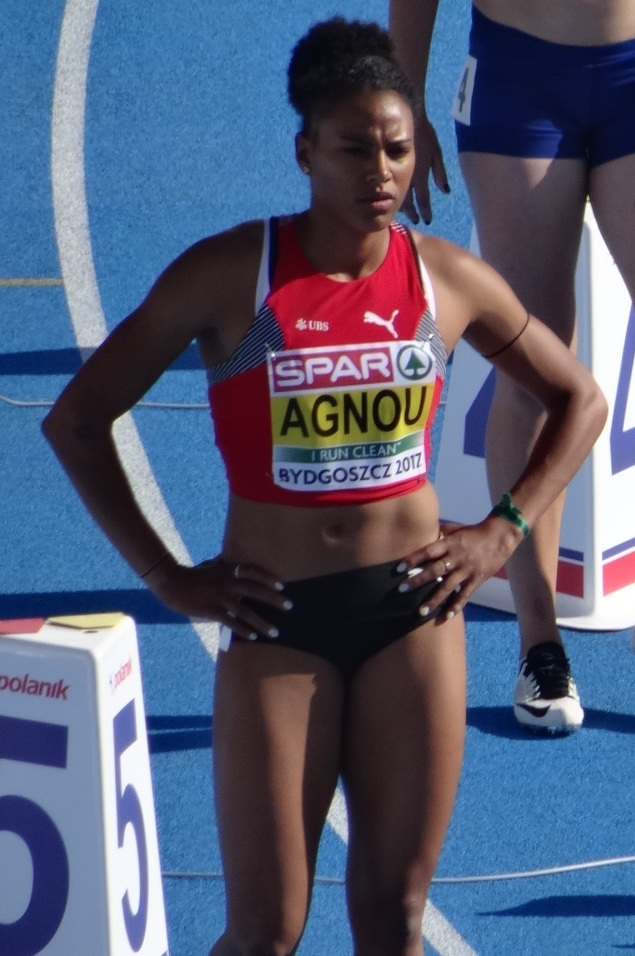
- Caroline Agnou in 2017

Personal information
- Born: 1996; Switzerland

Sport
- Sport: Track and field
- Event: Heptathlon
- Coached by: Hansruedi Kunz; Ousman Agnou

Caroline Agnou (born 26 May 1996) is a Swiss athlete who specialises in the heptathlon. She competed at the 2015 World Championships in Beijing, China, finishing 22nd. Earlier that year she won the gold at the 2015 European Junior Championships. Her personal best in heptathlon is 6123 points set in Eskilstuna in 2015. She has a Swiss-German mother and a Beninese father.

== Competition record ==
Year	Competition	Venue	Position	Event	Notes
Representing Switzerland
2014	World Junior Championships	Eugene, United States	11th	Heptathlon	5486 pts
2015	European Junior Championships	Eskilstuna, Sweden	1st	Heptathlon	6123 pts
2015	World Championships	Beijing, China	22nd	Heptathlon	5866 pts
2017	European Indoor Championships	Belgrade, Serbia	13th	Pentathlon	4169 pts
2017	European U23 Championships	Bydgoszcz, Poland	1st	Heptathlon	6330 pts
2017	World Championships	London, United Kingdom	21st	Heptathlon	6001 pts
2018	World Indoor Championships	Birmingham, United Kingdom	10th	Pentathlon	4397 pts
2019	Universiade	Naples, Italy	3rd	Heptathlon	5844 pts

== Personal bests ==
Outdoor

- 200 metres – 24.36 (-0.1 m/s) (Bydgoszcz 2017)
- 800 metres – 2:16.06 (Bydgoszcz 2017)
- 100 metres hurdles – 13.60 (-0.1 m/s) (Zürich 2017)
- High jump – 1.74 (Eskilstuna 2015)
- Long jump – 6.36 (+0.3 m/s) (Bydgoszcz 2017)
- Shot put – 14.77 (Bydgoszcz 2017)
- Javelin throw – 49.34 (Eskilstuna 2015)
- Heptathlon – 6330 (Bydgoszcz 2017)

Indoor

- 800 metres – 2:21.03 (Magglingen 2018)
- 60 metres hurdles – 8.42 (Magglingen 2018)
- High jump – 1.74 (Magglingen 2018)
- Long jump – 6.34 (Magglingen 2018)
- Shot put – 14.92 (Birmingham 2018)
- Pentathlon – 4440 (Magglingen 2018)
