= 2018 IAAF World Indoor Championships – Women's pentathlon =

Women's pentathlon at the 2018 IAAF World Indoor Championships
- Venue: Arena Birmingham
- Dates: 2 March
- Competitors: 12 from 10 nations
- Winning points: 4750

Medalists
gold medal	Katarina Johnson-Thompson	Great Britain
silver medal	Ivona Dadic	Austria
bronze medal	Yorgelis Rodríguez	Cuba

The women's pentathlon at the 2018 IAAF World Indoor Championships took place on 2 March 2018.

== Summary ==
No podium athletes returned from the previous championships, nor the 2017 World Championships or Olympics. The top returnee was sixth place Kendell Williams, while Katarina Johnson-Thompson and Yorgelis Rodríguez just missed the medals at the World Championships less than six months earlier.

Williams and her American teammate Erica Bougard dominated the first event, running the 60 meters hurdles in 8.08 and 8.07, respectively. Johnson-Thompson and Rodríguez came forward in the high jump clearing 1.91 m (6 ft 3 in) and 1.88m respectively. Johnson-Thompson took a 13 point lead over Bougard. Antoinette Nana Djimou had the best shot put by more than a metre over any of the leaders, 3 metres over Bougard, Williams and almost as much for Johnson-Thompson. Rodríguez took over the lead by 13 points over Johnson-Thompson, while Ivona Dadic moved into third just a point behind Johnson-Thompson. Back to another Johnson-Thompson specialty event, she long jumped 6.50 m (21 ft 3 3/4 in) to put 10 cm on Dadic and 35 cm on Rodríguez. A 2 cm superior jump by Eliška Klučinová was enough to displace Bougard from fourth place, both more than 100 points out of second place, still almost 40 points behind Rodríguez in third. In the final event, the 800 meters, Johnson-Thompson left no doubt, winning the race outright. More than a second behind her, Rodríguez did beat Dadic, but only by .12, not nearly enough to make up the 65 point deficit.

== Results ==
=== 60 metres hurdles ===
The 60 metres hurdles were started at 10:18.

Rank	Heat	Name	Nationality	Time	Points	Notes
1	2	Erica Bougard	United States	8.07	1113	
2	2	Kendell Williams	United States	8.08	1111	SB
3	2	Kateřina Cachová	Czech Republic	8.20	1084	
4	2	Antoinette Nana Djimou	France	8.29	1064	SB
5	1	Ivona Dadic	Austria	8.32	1057	PB
6	2	Katarina Johnson-Thompson	Great Britain	8.36	1048	SB
7	2	Xénia Krizsán	Hungary	8.38	1044	SB
8	1	Lecabela Quaresma	Portugal	8.51	1015	SB
9	1	Caroline Agnou	Switzerland	8.56	1004	
10	1	Yorgelis Rodríguez	Cuba	8.57	1002	PB
11	1	Eliška Klučinová	Czech Republic	8.65	984	
12	1	Alina Shukh	Ukraine	8.85	941	PB

=== High jump ===
The high jump was started at 11:54.

Rank	Group	Athlete	Nationality	1.64	1.67	1.70	1.73	1.76	1.79	1.82	1.85	1.88	1.91	1.94	Result	Points	Notes	Total
1	A	Katarina Johnson-Thompson	Great Britain	–	–	–	–	–	–	o	o	xo	xo	xxx	1.91	1119		2167
2	A	Yorgelis Rodríguez	Cuba	–	–	–	–	o	o	o	o	xo	xxx		1.88	1080	PB	2082
3	A	Erica Bougard	United States	–	–	–	o	–	o	o	xo	xxx			1.85	1041		2154
4	A	Eliška Klučinová	Czech Republic	–	–	o	o	o	o	o	xxx				1.82	1003		1987
5	A	Alina Shukh	Ukraine	–	–	–	o	xo	xo	o	xxx				1.82	1003		1944
6	A	Ivona Dadic	Austria	–	o	o	o	xo	xo	xxo	xxx				1.82	1003	SB	2060
6	B	Xénia Krizsán	Hungary	o	–	o	o	o	xxo	xxo	xxx				1.82	1003	PB	2047
8	B	Kendell Williams	United States	–	o	o	o	xo	xxx						1.76	928		2039
9	B	Lecabela Quaresma	Portugal	o	o	o	xxo	xo	xxx						1.76	928	SB	1943
10	B	Caroline Agnou	Switzerland	o	o	xo	xo	xxx							1.73	891		1895
11	B	Kateřina Cachová	Czech Republic	xxo	o	o	xxx								1.70	855		1939
12	B	Antoinette Nana Djimou	France	o	o	xo	xxx								1.70	855		1919

=== Shot put ===
The shot put was started at 13:29.

Rank	Athlete	Nationality	#1	#2	#3	Result	Points	Notes	Total
1	Antoinette Nana Djimou	France	x	15.52	14.21	15.52	896	PB	2815
2	Caroline Agnou	Switzerland	13.76	14.18	14.92	14.92	856	PB	2751
3	Eliška Klučinová	Czech Republic	14.56	14.28	14.76	14.76	845	SB	2832
4	Ivona Dadic	Austria	14.27	13.77	14.05	14.27	812	SB	2872
5	Yorgelis Rodríguez	Cuba	x	13.90	14.15	14.15	804	SB	2886
6	Lecabela Quaresma	Portugal	13.85	13.44	14.12	14.12	802	SB	2745
7	Alina Shukh	Ukraine	14.08	13.73	x	14.08	799	SB	2743
8	Xénia Krizsán	Hungary	13.88	13.50	13.40	13.88	786		2833
9	Katarina Johnson-Thompson	Great Britain	12.68	12.00	11.99	12.68	706	PB	2873
10	Erica Bougard	United States	11.89	11.85	12.31	12.31	682		2836
11	Kateřina Cachová	Czech Republic	11.17	12.07	12.18	12.18	673		2612
12	Kendell Williams	United States	x	11.58	12.13	12.13	670		2709

=== Long jump ===
The long jump was started at 18:00.

Rank	Athlete	Nationality	#1	#2	#3	Result	Points	Notes	Total
1	Katarina Johnson-Thompson	Great Britain	6.50	6.43	6.50	6.50	1007		3880
2	Ivona Dadic	Austria	6.29	6.29	6.40	6.40	975	SB	3847
3	Kendell Williams	United States	6.14	6.30	6.21	6.30	943		3652
4	Eliška Klučinová	Czech Republic	6.02	6.20	5.88	6.20	912		3744
5	Erica Bougard	United States	x	6.06	6.18	6.18	905		3741
6	Yorgelis Rodríguez	Cuba	x	6.15	x	6.15	896		3782
7	Antoinette Nana Djimou	France	6.04	6.11	6.13	6.13	890		3705
8	Alina Shukh	Ukraine	5.75	x	6.09	6.09	877		3620
9	Xénia Krizsán	Hungary	x	6.09	x	6.09	877		3620
10	Lecabela Quaresma	Portugal	6.01	x	x	6.01	853	SB	3598
11	Caroline Agnou	Switzerland	5.67	5.87	5.96	5.96	837		3588
12	Kateřina Cachová	Czech Republic	x	5.80	5.94	5.94	831		3443

=== 800 metres ===
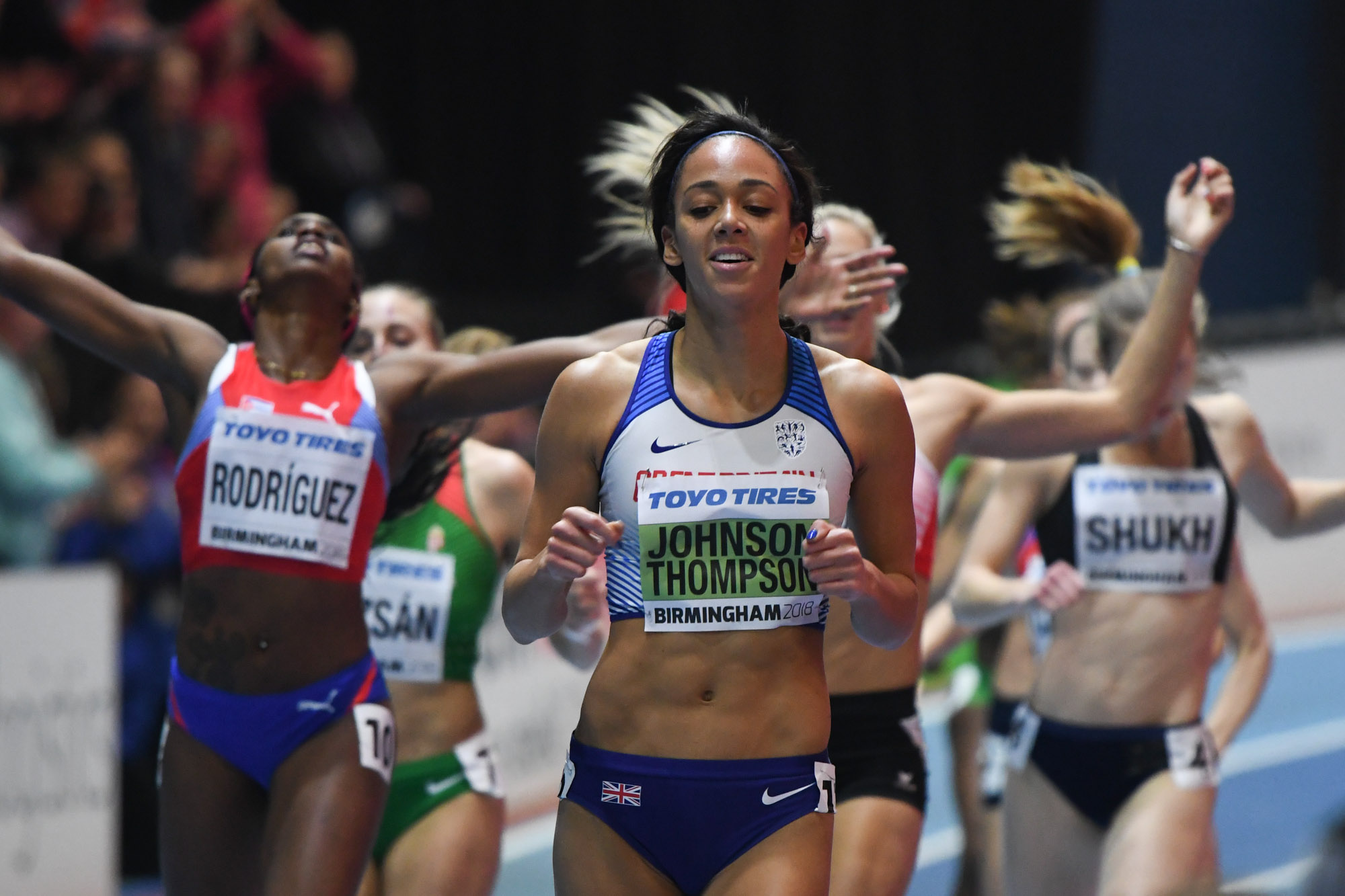
Katarina Johnson-Thompson confirms her victory by winning the final event

The 800 metres were started at 20:18.

Rank	Name	Nationality	Time	Points	Notes
1	Katarina Johnson-Thompson	Great Britain	2:16.63	870	
2	Yorgelis Rodríguez	Cuba	2:17.70	855	
3	Ivona Dadic	Austria	2:17.82	853	
4	Xénia Krizsán	Hungary	2:18.12	849	
5	Alina Shukh	Ukraine	2:18.36	846	
6	Kateřina Cachová	Czech Republic	2:18.90	839	
7	Eliška Klučinová	Czech Republic	2:19.16	835	
8	Erica Bougard	United States	2:19.51	830	
9	Lecabela Quaresma	Portugal	2:19.85	826	
10	Caroline Agnou	Switzerland	2:21.08	809	
11	Kendell Williams	United States	2:24.60	762	
	Antoinette Nana Djimou	France	DNF	0	

=== Final standings ===
After all events.

The highest mark recorded in each event is highlighted in yellow

Rank	Athlete	Nationality	60m H	HJ	SP	LJ	800m	Points	Notes
1st place, gold medalist(s)	Katarina Johnson-Thompson	Great Britain	8.36	1.91	12.68	6.50	2:16.63	4750	SB
2nd place, silver medalist(s)	Ivona Dadic	Austria	8.32	1.82	14.27	6.40	2:17.82	4700	SB
3rd place, bronze medalist(s)	Yorgelis Rodríguez	Cuba	8.57	1.88	14.15	6.15	2:17.70	4637	NR
4	Eliška Klučinová	Czech Republic	8.65	1.82	14.76	6.20	2:19.16	4579	
5	Erica Bougard	United States	8.07	1.85	12.31	6.18	2:19.51	4571	
6	Xénia Krizsán	Hungary	8.38	1.82	13.88	6.09	2:18.12	4559	
7	Alina Shukh	Ukraine	8.85	1.82	14.08	6.09	2:18.36	4466	
8	Lecabela Quaresma	Portugal	8.51	1.76	14.12	6.01	2:19.85	4424	SB
9	Kendell Williams	United States	8.08	1.76	12.13	6.30	2:24.60	4414	
10	Caroline Agnou	Switzerland	8.56	1.73	14.92	5.96	2:21.08	4397	
11	Kateřina Cachová	Czech Republic	8.20	1.70	12.18	5.94	2:18.90	4282	
12	Antoinette Nana Djimou	France	8.29	1.70	15.52	6.13	DNF	3705	
