= Agate de Sousa =

Portuguese long jumper (born 2000)

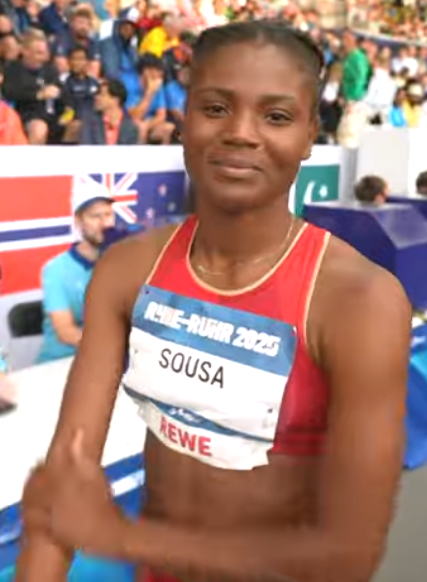
- At the 2025 Summer World University Games

Personal information
- Nationality: São Tomé and Príncipe (to 16 May 2024); Portugal (from 17 May 2024)
- Born: 5 June 2000 (age 26)
- Height: 172 cm (5 ft 8 in)
- Weight: 62 kg (137 lb)

Sport
- Sport: Athletics
- Events: Long jump Triple jump

Achievements and titles
- National finals: 2020 Portuguese Indoors; • Long jump, 3rd (bronze); 2020 Portuguese Ind. U23s; • Long jump, 1st (gold); 2020 Portuguese Champs; • Long jump, 2nd (silver); 2022 Portuguese Indoors; • Long jump, 2nd (silver); 2022 Portuguese U23s; • 100m, 1st (gold); • Long jump, 1st (gold); • 200m, 1st (gold); 2023 Portuguese Indoors; • Long jump, 2nd (silver); • Triple jump, 2nd (silver); 2023 Portuguese Champs; • Long jump, 1st (gold); • Triple jump, 1st (gold)
- Personal bests
Medal record
Women's athletics
Representing Portugal
World Indoor Championships
Gold medal – first place	2026 Toruń	Long jump
European Championships
Bronze medal – third place	2024 Rome	Long jump
Summer World University Games
Gold medal – first place	2025 Bochum	Long jump
- Updated on 15 January 2024

Agate de Sousa (born 5 June 2000) is a Santomean-Portuguese long jumper living in Portugal since 2019. Competing as a foreign national, she has won the 2023 Portuguese Athletics Federation Championships in both the long and triple jump, and she is the current Santomean national record holder in the long jump with her 7.03 metres best.

== Biography ==
Sousa began her international career as a 100 metres sprinter. She was slated to compete at the 2017 World U18 Championships in the 100 m, but she did not start.

At the 2019 African Games, de Sousa competed in both the 100 m and long jump. In the 100 m, she finished 26th overall, barely failing to qualify for the semifinals. However, in the long jump, de Sousa finished 7th overall, with her best jump of 6.05 metres coming from her first attempt. In mid-2019, de Sousa moved to Portugal, where she began competing at the Portuguese Athletics Federation Championships as a non-scoring foreign national.

de Sousa improved significantly over the next several years, with her first Santomean national record coming in 2021, jumping 6.68 m to break Naide Gomes's longstanding 2001 mark. During the 2021 indoor season, de Sousa was hampered by the fact that she could not leave Portugal for international competitions because she would not be allowed back in, as she was not a Portuguese citizen. She was able to compete in several European meetings starting in May 2021, and she would go on to further improve her long jump record to 7.03 metres at the B&S Kurpfalz Gala in May 2023 – becoming the fourth African woman ever to clear 7 metres.

As of 2023, de Sousa had begun the naturalization process to achieve dual citizenship between São Tomé and Príncipe and Portugal, opening up the possibility that she may switch nationality to Portugal as Naide Gomes did in June 2001. She became eligible for Portugal on 17 May 2024.

In 2026, Agate de Sousa was crowned world champion in the long jump. Agate won the gold medal in the women's long jump at the World Short Track and Field Championships in Torun, Poland. On her fifth jump, the jumper came close to her personal best, reaching 6.92 m, and secured the title with one try still to be made.

== Statistics ==
=== Best performances ===
Event	Mark	Place	Competition	Venue	Date	Ref
Long jump	7.03 m (+1.7 m/s)	1st place, gold medalist(s)	B&S Kurpfalz Gala	Weinheim, Germany	27 May 2023	
Triple jump	14.13 m	2nd place, silver medalist(s)	Portuguese Club Championships First Division	Pombal, Portugal	12 February 2023	
