= Athletics at the 2019 Summer Universiade – Women's heptathlon =

The women's heptathlon event at the 2019 Summer Universiade was held on 11 and 12 July at the Stadio San Paolo in Naples.

== Medalists ==
Gold	Silver	Bronze
Miia Sillman; Finland	Marthe Koala; Burkina Faso	Caroline Agnou; Switzerland

== Results ==
=== 100 metres hurdles ===
Wind:
Heat 1: +1.1 m/s, Heat 2: +1.2 m/s, Heat 3: -0.4 m/s

Rank	Heat	Name	Nationality	Time	Points	Notes
1	3	Marthe Koala	Burkina Faso	13.21	1093	
2	3	Emma Nwofor	Great Britain	13.72	1018	
3	3	Miia Sillman	Finland	13.84	1001	
4	3	Caroline Agnou	Switzerland	13.88	995	
5	3	Lilian Borja	Mexico	13.97	983	
6	3	Diane Marie-Hardy	France	14.23	946	
7	2	Hertta Heikkinen	Finland	14.31	935	
8	2	Lucy Turner	Great Britain	14.44	917	
9	2	Jestena Mattson	United States	14.44	917	
10	3	Eleonora Ferrero	Italy	14.48	912	
11	2	Paulina Ligarska	Poland	14.54	903	
12	1	Chen Cai-juan	Chinese Taipei	14.63	891	
13	1	Martina Corra	Argentina	14.80	868	
14	2	Tori West	Australia	14.90	855	
14	2	Bridget Deveau	Canada	14.99	843	
15	2	Skylar Sieben	Canada	15.17	819	
16	1	Dhanusha Manju Rukmini	India	15.33	799	
17	1	Rimpy Dabas	India	15.48	779	
18	1	Marite Ennuste	Estonia	15.97	718	
19	1	Anouchka	Madagascar	16.21	689	
20	1	Tjaša Potočar	Slovenia	16.42	664	

=== High jump ===
Rank	Group	Athlete	Nationality	1.35	1.38	1.41	1.44	1.47	1.50	1.53	1.56	1.59	1.62	1.65	1.68	1.71	1.74	1.77	1.80	1.83	1.86	Result	Points	Notes	Total
1	A	Miia Sillman	Finland	–	–	–	–	–	–	–	–	–	–	–	–	–	o	o	xo	o	xxx	1.83	1016		2017
2	A	Paulina Ligarska	Poland	–	–	–	–	–	–	–	–	–	o	o	o	o	xo	xxx				1.74	903		1806
3	A	Eleonora Ferrero	Italy	–	–	–	–	–	–	o	o	o	xo	o	o	xo	xxx					1.71	867		1779
4	A	Marthe Koala	Burkina Faso	–	–	–	–	–	–	–	–	–	o	xo	o	xxx						1.68	830		1923
5	A	Hertta Heikkinen	Finland	–	–	–	–	–	–	–	–	o	o	xxo	o	xxx						1.68	830		1765
6	A	Marite Ennuste	Estonia	–	–	–	–	–	–	–	–	o	o	o	xo	xxx						1.68	830		1548
6	A	Emma Nwofor	Great Britain	–	–	–	–	–	–	–	–	–	o	o	xo	xxx						1.68	830		1848
9	A	Tori West	Australia	–	–	–	–	–	–	–	–	–	xo	o	xo	xxx						1.68	830		1685
10	B	Chen Cai-juan	Chinese Taipei	–	–	–	–	–	–	–	–	xo	o	xo	xo	xxx						1.68	830		1721
11	B	Jestena Mattson	United States	–	–	–	–	–	–	–	–	o	xo	xo	xxo	xxx						1.68	830		1747
12	A	Caroline Agnou	Switzerland	–	–	–	–	–	–	xo	o	xo	xo	xo	xxx							1.65	795		1790
13	A	Lilian Borja	Mexico	–	–	–	–	–	–	–	–	–	o	xxo	xxx							1.65	795		1778
14	B	Skylar Sieben	Canada	–	–	–	–	–	o	o	o	xo	xxx									1.59	724		1543
14	B	Diane Marie-Hardy	France	–	–	–	–	–	o	o	o	xo	xxx									1.59	724		1670
16	B	Martina Corra	Argentina	–	–	–	–	o	o	xxx												1.50	621		1489
17	B	Rimpy Dabas	India	–	–	o	o	xo	xxo	xxx												1.50	621		1400
18	B	Bridget Deveau	Canada	–	–	–	o	o	xxx													1.47	588		1431
19	A	Anouchka	Madagascar	o	o	o	xo	o	xxx													1.47	588		1277
20	B	Lucy Turner	Great Britain	–	–	–	–	xo	xxx													1.47	588		1505
21	B	Tjaša Potočar	Slovenia	o	o	xo	xo	xxx														1.44	555		1219
22	B	Dhanusha Manju Rukmini	India	o	o	o	xxo	xxx														1.44	555		1354

=== Shot put ===
Rank	Group	Athlete	Nationality	#1	#2	#3	Result	Points	Notes	Total
1	A	Caroline Agnou	Switzerland	13.79	13.91	13.53	13.91	788		2578
2	A	Tori West	Australia	12.74	13.53	13.29	13.53	763		2448
3	A	Paulina Ligarska	Poland	13.31	13.50	13.27	13.50	761		2567
4	A	Miia Sillman	Finland	12.99	x	x	12.99	727		2744
5	A	Marthe Koala	Burkina Faso	12.03	x	12.73	12.73	709		2632
6	A	Diane Marie-Hardy	France	12.11	12.20	12.48	12.48	693		2363
7	A	Hertta Heikkinen	Finland	12.04	12.46	x	12.46	692		2457
8	B	Chen Cai-juan	Chinese Taipei	10.69	11.81	12.23	12.23	676		2397
9	A	Jestena Mattson	United States	11.35	11.55	x	11.55	631		2378
10	B	Marite Ennuste	Estonia	10.20	11.19	11.40	11.40	621		2169
11	A	Emma Nwofor	Great Britain	10.92	11.25	x	11.25	612		2460
12	B	Lilian Borja	Mexico	11.14	10.99	10.81	11.14	604		2382
13	B	Eleonora Ferrero	Italy	10.12	10.73	11.14	11.14	604		2383
14	B	Lucy Turner	Great Britain	10.83	x	10.79	10.83	584		2089
15	B	Skylar Sieben	Canada	10.02	10.57	x	10.57	567		2110
16	A	Bridget Deveau	Canada	10.57	x	9.76	10.57	567		1998
17	B	Martina Corra	Argentina	9.99	10.52	9.75	10.52	564		2053
18	B	Tjaša Potočar	Slovenia	9.38	9.55	8.79	9.55	500		1719
19	B	Rimpy Dabas	India	8.38	8.51	7.98	8.51	432		1832
20	B	Dhanusha Manju Rukmini	India	8.00	7.79	x	8.00	399		1753
21	B	Anouchka	Madagascar	5.84	6.29	7.12	7.12	343		1620

=== 200 metres ===
Wind:
Heat 1: +0.1 m/s, Heat 2: +0.4 m/s, Heat 3: +1.0 m/s

Rank	Heat	Name	Nationality	Time	Points	Notes	Total
1	3	Marthe Koala	Burkina Faso	23.83	997		3629
2	3	Hertta Heikkinen	Finland	24.36	946		3403
3	3	Jestena Mattson	United States	24.56	928		3306
4	3	Miia Sillman	Finland	24.83	902		3646
5	2	Caroline Agnou	Switzerland	24.97	890		3468
6	2	Paulina Ligarska	Poland	25.04	883		3450
6	3	Tori West	Australia	25.04	883		3331
8	3	Diane Marie-Hardy	France	25.13	875		3238
9	2	Skylar Sieben	Canada	25.23	866		2976
10	2	Emma Nwofor	Great Britain	25.27	862		3322
11	3	Lilian Borja	Mexico	25.29	860		3242
12	2	Eleonora Ferrero	Italy	26.11	788		3171
13	1	Martina Corra	Argentina	26.20	780		2833
14	2	Chen Cai-juan	Chinese Taipei	26.38	764		3161
15	1	Dhanusha Manju Rukmini	India	26.44	759		2512
16	2	Lucy Turner	Great Britain	26.54	751		2840
17	1	Anouchka	Madagascar	26.67	740		2360
18	1	Bridget Deveau	Canada	26.92	718		2716
19	1	Tjaša Potočar	Slovenia	26.94	717		2436
20	1	Rimpy Dabas	India	27.57	665		2497
21	1	Marite Ennuste	Estonia	28.23	613		2782

=== Long jump ===
Rank	Group	Athlete	Nationality	#1	#2	#3	Result	Points	Notes	Total
1	A	Marthe Koala	Burkina Faso	6.31	6.40	5.70	6.40	975		4604
2	A	Miia Sillman	Finland	x	6.18	6.00	6.18	905		4551
3	A	Hertta Heikkinen	Finland	5.96	5.77	5.74	5.96	837		4240
4	A	Eleonora Ferrero	Italy	5.51	5.86	5.67	5.86	807		3978
5	B	Emma Nwofor	Great Britain	5.76	5.69	5.58	5.76	777		4099
6	A	Jestena Mattson	United States	5.40	5.62	5.73	5.73	768		4074
7	B	Chen Cai-juan	Chinese Taipei	x	5.64	5.44	5.64	741		3902
8	A	Caroline Agnou	Switzerland	x	5.45	x	5.45	686		4154
9	B	Skylar Sieben	Canada	5.16	5.43	5.41	5.43	680		3656
10	A	Paulina Ligarska	Poland	3.79	5.42	5.38	5.42	677		4127
11	A	Lilian Borja	Mexico	5.31	5.26	5.36	5.36	660		3902
12	B	Bridget Deveau	Canada	5.15	5.36	5.19	5.36	660		3376
13	A	Tori West	Australia	5.14	5.27	5.22	5.27	634		3965
14	B	Marite Ennuste	Estonia	5.11	x	x	5.11	589		3371
15	B	Rimpy Dabas	India	x	5.00	4.95	5.00	559		3056
16	B	Anouchka	Madagascar	4.76	4.91	4.49	4.91	535		2895
17	B	Dhanusha Manju Rukmini	India	4.58	4.71	4.88	4.88	527		3039
18	B	Tjaša Potočar	Slovenia	4.49	4.54	4.76	4.76	495		2931
	A	Diane Marie-Hardy	France	x	x	x	NM	0		3238
	B	Martina Corra	Argentina	x	x	x	NM	0		2833
	A	Lucy Turner	Great Britain				DNS	0		DNF

=== Javelin throw ===
Rank	Athlete	Nationality	#1	#2	#3	Result	Points	Notes	Total
1	Tori West	Australia	52.28	53.27	51.28	53.27	924		4889
2	Miia Sillman	Finland	50.07	–	–	50.07	861		5412
3	Caroline Agnou	Switzerland	48.57	x	43.35	48.57	832		4986
4	Marthe Koala	Burkina Faso	40.64	42.95	x	42.95	724		5328
5	Lilian Borja	Mexico	37.07	37.58	39.66	39.66	661		4563
6	Hertta Heikkinen	Finland	39.14	x	x	39.14	651		4891
7	Bridget Deveau	Canada	x	38.80	36.08	38.80	644		4020
8	Martina Corra	Argentina	38.73	36.87	35.20	38.73	643		3476
9	Eleonora Ferrero	Italy	34.22	36.08	38.29	38.29	635		4613
10	Paulina Ligarska	Poland	36.88	37.47	34.89	37.47	619		4746
11	Jestena Mattson	United States	x	36.88	32.09	36.88	608		4682
12	Chen Cai-juan	Chinese Taipei	x	x	34.98	34.98	571		4473
13	Skylar Sieben	Canada	x	32.10	34.27	34.27	558		4214
14	Emma Nwofor	Great Britain	33.48	34.05	31.89	34.05	554		4653
15	Marite Ennuste	Estonia	33.66	x	–	33.66	546		3917
16	Dhanusha Manju Rukmini	India	20.96	28.04	26.19	28.04	440		3479
17	Rimpy Dabas	India	21.53	21.65	24.57	24.57	374		3430
18	Tjaša Potočar	Slovenia	22.32	22.37	x	22.37	333		3264
19	Anouchka	Madagascar	17.64	x	17.50	17.64	245		3140
	Diane Marie-Hardy	France				DNS	0		DNF

=== 800 metres ===
Rank	Heat	Name	Nationality	Time	Points	Notes
1	1	Lilian Borja	Mexico	2:15.57	1093	
2	2	Caroline Agnou	Switzerland	2:17.51	858	
3	2	Hertta Heikkinen	Finland	2:17.52	858	
4	2	Paulina Ligarska	Poland	2:18.57	843	
5	1	Skylar Sieben	Canada	2:20.04	823	
6	2	Miia Sillman	Finland	2:21.94	797	
7	2	Marthe Koala	Burkina Faso	2:22.27	793	
8	2	Eleonora Ferrero	Italy	2:25.70	748	
9	2	Emma Nwofor	Great Britain	2:26.72	735	
10	2	Tori West	Australia	2:27.49	725	
11	2	Jestena Mattson	United States	2:28.00	718	
12	1	Dhanusha Manju Rukmini	India	2:32.07	667	
13	1	Marite Ennuste	Estonia	2:33.96	644	
14	1	Chen Cai-juan	Chinese Taipei	2:35.65	624	
15	1	Anouchka	Madagascar	2:37.93	597	
16	1	Martina Corra	Argentina	2:38.98	585	
17	1	Rimpy Dabas	India	2:39.25	581	
18	1	Tjaša Potočar	Slovenia	2:43.47	534	
	1	Bridget Deveau	Canada	DQ	0	R163.3.a

=== Final standings ===
Official Video

The highest mark recorded in each event is highlighted in yellow

Rank	Athlete	Nationality	100m H	HJ	SP	200m	LJ	JT	800m	Points	Notes
1st place, gold medalist(s)	Miia Sillman	Finland	13.84	1.83	12.99	24.83	6.18	50.07	2:21.94	6209	
2nd place, silver medalist(s)	Marthe Koala	Burkina Faso	13.21	1.68	12.73	23.83	6.40	42.95	2:22.27	6121	
3rd place, bronze medalist(s)	Caroline Agnou	Switzerland	13.88	1.65	13.91	24.97	5.45	48.57	2:17.51	5844	
4	Hertta Heikkinen	Finland	14.31	1.68	12.46	24.36	5.96	39.14	2:17.52	5749	
5	Tori West	Australia	14.90	1.68	13.53	25.04	5.27	53.27	2:27.49	5614	
6	Paulina Ligarska	Poland	14.54	1.74	13.50	25.04	5.42	37.47	2:18.57	5589	
7	Lilian Borja	Mexico	13.97	1.65	11.14	25.29	5.36	39.66	2:15.57	5448	
8	Jestena Mattson	United States	14.44	1.68	11.55	24.56	5.73	36.88	2:28.00	5400	
9	Emma Nwofor	Great Britain	13.72	1.68	11.25	25.27	5.76	34.05	2:26.72	5388	
10	Eleonora Ferrero	Italy	14.48	1.71	11.14	26.11	5.86	38.29	2:25.70	5361	
11	Chen Cai-juan	Chinese Taipei	14.63	1.68	12.23	26.38	5.64	34.98	2:35.65	5097	
12	Skylar Sieben	Canada	15.17	1.59	10.57	25.23	5.43	34.27	2:20.04	5037	
13	Marite Ennuste	Estonia	15.97	1.68	11.40	28.23	5.11	33.66	2:33.96	4561	
14	Dhanusha Manju Rukmini	India	15.33	1.44	8.00	26.44	4.88	28.04	2:32.07	4146	
15	Martina Corra	Argentina	14.80	1.50	10.52	26.20	NM	38.73	2:38.98	4061	
16	Bridget Deveau	Canada	14.99	1.47	10.57	26.92	5.36	38.80	DQ	4020	
17	Rimpy Dabas	India	15.48	1.50	8.51	27.57	5.00	24.57	2:39.25	4011	
18	Tjaša Potočar	Slovenia	16.42	1.44	9.55	26.94	4.76	22.37	2:43.47	3798	
19	Anouchka	Madagascar	16.21	1.47	7.12	26.67	4.91	17.64	2:37.93	3737	
	Diane Marie-Hardy	France	14.23	1.59	12.48	25.13	NM	DNS	–	DNF	
	Lucy Turner	Great Britain	14.44	1.47	10.83	26.54	DNS	–	–	DNF	
