= Sara Zabarino =

Italian javelin thrower

Personal information
- National team: Italian Team
- Born: 1 August 1999 (age 26) Biella, Italy
- Height: 1.64 m (5 ft 5 in)
- Weight: 62 kg (137 lb)

Sport
- Country: Italy
- Sport: Athletics
- Event: Javelin throw
- Club: Acsi Italia Atletica
- Coached by: Massimiliano Remus

Achievements and titles
- Personal best: Javelin throw: 58.62 m (2019)
Medal record
European Throwing Cup (U23)
Gold medal – first place	2019 Šamorín	Javelin throw

Sara Zabarino (born 1 August 1999) is an Italian javelin thrower who won a gold medal at the 2019 European Throwing Cup at under-23 level with her new personal best, 58.62 m, that is the 10th best world performance of the year and 4th all-time in Italy lists.

Since August 2023, she has been a member of the track and field team at the University of Southern California, United States.

== Biography ==
On 10 July 2018 she qualified for the final of the javelin throw at the 2018 IAAF World U20 Championships in Tampere, with the best measure among the participating athletes. In the final she placed 5th, with a best of 52.98m.

== National records ==
- Javelin throw under-23: 58.62 m – (Slovakia) Šamorín, 10 March 2019

== Achievements ==
Year	Competition	Venue	Position	Event	Measure	Notes
2018	World U20 Championships	(Finland) Tampere	5th	Javelin throw	52.98 m	
2019	European Throwing Cup	(Slovakia) Šamorín	1st	Javelin throw (U23)	58.62 m	PB NUR
2021	2021 European Athletics U23 Championships	(Estonia) Tallinn	9th	Javelin throw	52.01 m	

== Personal bests ==
- Javelin throw: 58.62 m – (Slovakia) Šamorín, 10 March 2019

== See also ==
- Italian all-time lists - Javelin throw
