= Alina Shukh =

Ukrainian heptathlete (born 1999)

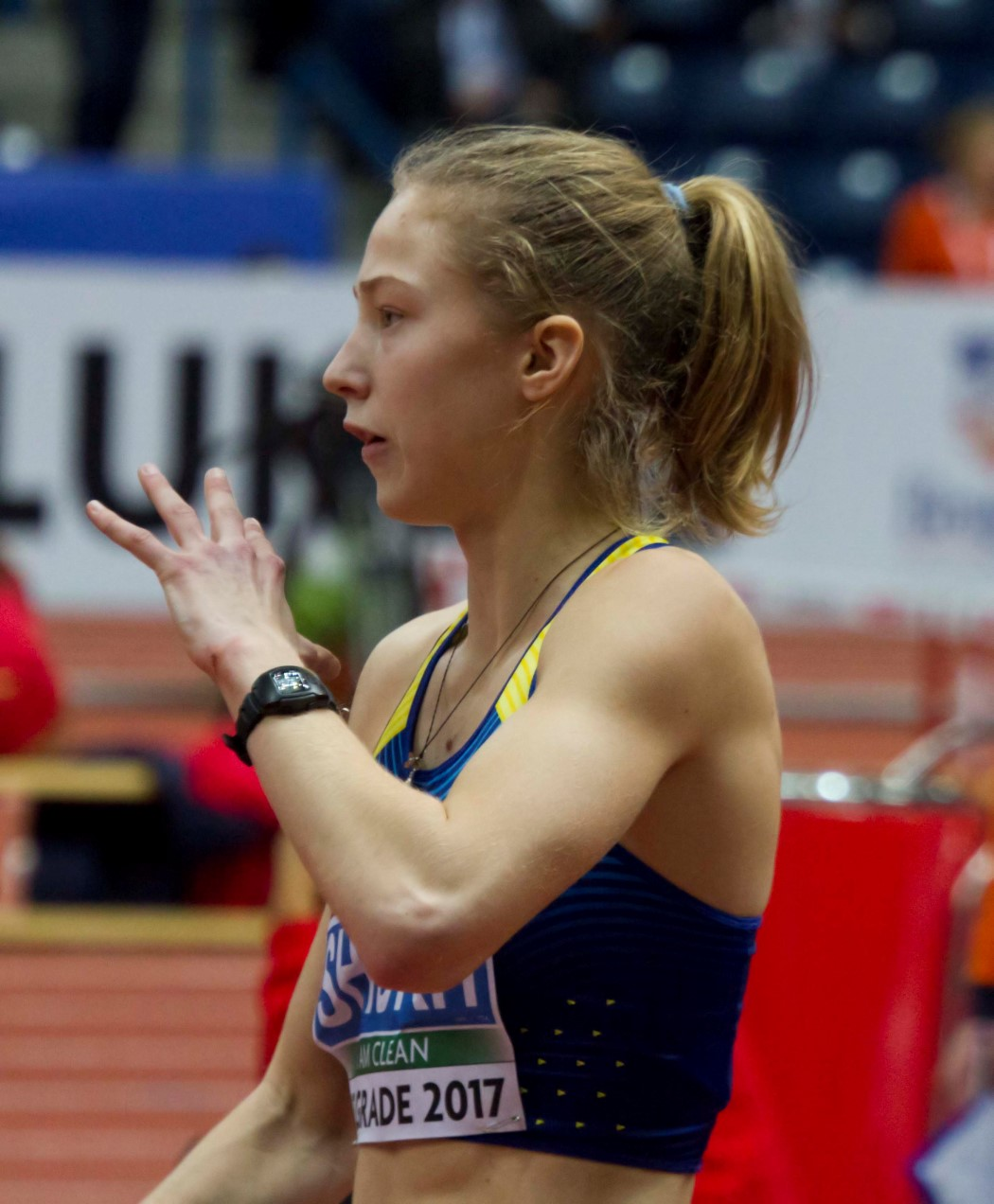
- Shukh in 2017

Personal information
- Born: 12 February 1999 (age 27) Brovary, Ukraine
- Height: 1.75 m (5 ft 9 in)

Sport
- Country: Ukraine
- Sport: Athletics
- Event(s): Heptathlon, Pentathlon, Javelin throw
- Coached by: Maya and Anatoliy Shukh
Medal record
Women's athletics
Representing Ukraine
World U20 Championships
Gold medal – first place	2018 Tampere	Javelin throw
European U20 Championships
Gold medal – first place	2017 Grosseto	Heptathlon
World U18 Championships
Bronze medal – third place	2015 Cali	Heptathlon
European U18 Championships
Gold medal – first place	2016 Tbilisi	Heptathlon

Alina Anatolyivna Shukh (Ukrainian: Аліна Анатоліївна Шух; born 12 February 1999) is a Ukrainian athlete specialising in the combined events. She won the gold medal in the javelin throw at the 2018 World Under-20 Championships. In the heptathlon, Shukh claimed gold at the 2017 European U20 Championships, bronze at the 2015 World U18 Championships and gold at the 2016 European U18 Championships.

She is the world junior record holder for the pentathlon with the third-best U20 mark in history (some results were not ratified as there was no post-competition doping control). Shukh is a five-time Ukrainian national champion.

She competed in the women's heptathlon at the 2017 World Championships in Athletics in London, placing 14th, and in the women's pentathlon at the 2018 World Indoor Championships held in Birmingham, finishing seventh.

== Statistics ==
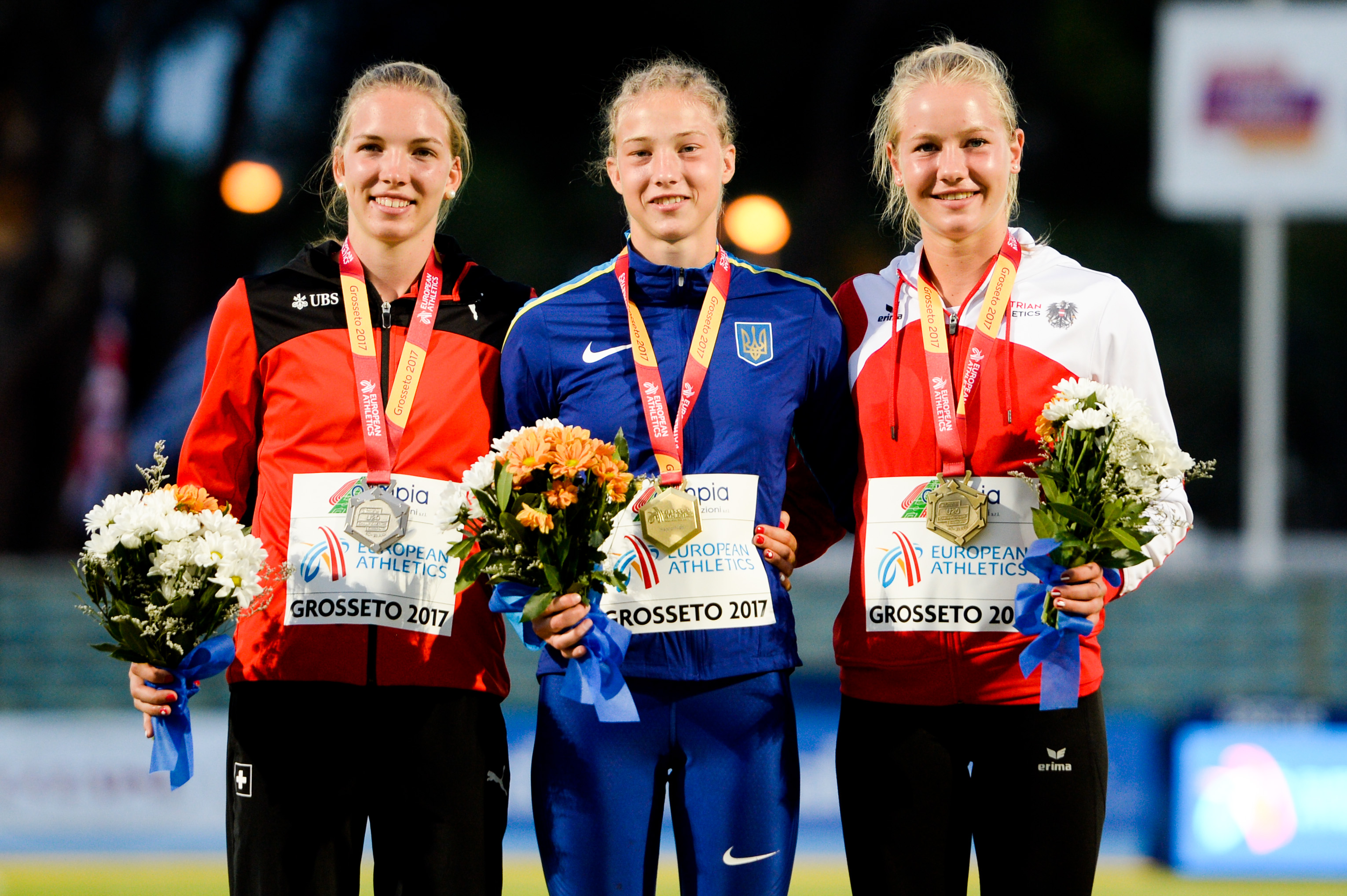
Shukh (C) with her gold on the women's heptathlon podium at the 2017 European Under-20 Championships in Grosseto

=== International competitions ===
Representing Ukraine
Year	Competition	Venue	Position	Event	Result
2015	World Youth Championships	Cali, Colombia	3rd	Heptathlon	5896 pts
2015	European Youth Olympic Festival	Tbilisi, Georgia	17th (h)	100 m hurdles (76.2 cm)	14.42
2016	European Youth Championships	Tbilisi, Georgia	6th	Javelin throw	54.00
2016	European Youth Championships	Tbilisi, Georgia	1st	Heptathlon	6186 pts WYB
2017	European Indoor Championships	Belgrade, Serbia	11th	Pentathlon	4377 pts
2017	European CE Team Championships Super League	Tallinn, Estonia	1st	Heptathlon	6208 pts NJR
2017	European U20 Championships	Grosseto, Italy	1st	Heptathlon	6381 pts WU20L
2017	World Championships	London, United Kingdom	14th	Heptathlon	6075 pts
2018	World Indoor Championships	Birmingham, United Kingdom	7th	Pentathlon	4466 pts
2018	World U20 Championships	Tampere, Finland	1st	Javelin throw	55.95 SB
2018	World U20 Championships	Tampere, Finland	–	Heptathlon	DNF
2018	European Championships	Berlin, Germany	15th	Heptathlon	5985 pts
2019	European Indoor Championships	Glasgow, United Kingdom	–	Pentathlon	DNF
2019	European U23 Championships	Gävle, Sweden	15th	Heptathlon	5530 pts

=== Personal bests ===
- Heptathlon – 6386 pts (Lutsk 2020)
- Heptathlon U18 – 6186 pts (Tbilisi 2016) NU18R
- Javelin throw – 56.54 m (Lutsk 2017)

Indoors

- Pentathlon – 4602 pts (Sumy 2020)
- Pentathlon U20 – 4542 pts (Lasnamäe 2017) WU20R

=== National titles ===
- Ukrainian Athletics Championships
  - Heptathlon: 2016, 2020
- Ukrainian Indoor Athletics Championships
  - Pentathlon: 2018, 2019, 2020
