= Filipe Lombá =

Portuguese sprinter

Personal information
- Nationality: Portuguese
- Born: 14 November 1959 (age 66) São Tomé

Sport
- Sport: Sprinting
- Event: 400 metres

Filipe Lombá (born 14 November 1959) is a Portuguese sprinter. He competed in the men's 400 metres at the 1988 Summer Olympics.
