= António Menezes =

Portuguese sailor

Personal information
- Full name: António Vasco de Mello da Silva César de Menezes
- Nationality: Portuguese
- Born: 5 April 1931; Lisbon, Portugal

Sport
- Sport: Sailing

António Menezes (born 5 April 1931) is a Portuguese sailor. He competed in the Dragon event at the 1968 Summer Olympics.
