= Bruno Barros =

Brazilian footballer (born 1982)

Bruno Barros di Pietro
Personal information
- Full name: Bruno Barros di Pietro
- Date of birth: 15 June 1982 (age 44)
- Place of birth: Teófilo Otoni, Brazil
- Height: 1.79 m (5 ft 10 in)
- Position: Left-back

Team information
- Current team: Paracatu (head coach)

Youth career
- 2001–2002: América Mineiro

Senior career*
Years	Team	Apps	(Gls)
2002–2005	América Mineiro		
2003	→ Monlevade (loan)		
2006	Londrina		
2006	Fortaleza	21	(0)
2007	CRB		
2008	Atlético Mineiro	2	(0)
2008–2010	Villa Rio		
2008	→ CRB (loan)	5	(0)
2009	→ América Mineiro (loan)	10	(0)
2009	→ ABC (loan)	15	(2)
2010	→ Anapolina (loan)	13	(1)
2011	América-TO	13	(2)
2011–2012	Villa Nova	4	(0)
2012	América-TO	4	(0)
2013	Nacional-MG	7	(0)
2014	América-TO	1	(0)
2014–2015	Tupi	12	(2)
2015	América-TO	16	(3)
2015	Villa Nova	5	(0)
2015	ASEEV	1	(0)
2016	Anápolis	6	(0)
2017–2018	América-TO	10	(0)

Managerial career
- 2018: América-TO (assistant)
- 2018–2019: América-TO
- 2019–2020: Betim
- 2020–2021: Aymorés
- 2021–2022: Uberaba
- 2022: Boston City Brasil
- 2023: América-TO
- 2024: Betim
- 2024–: Paracatu
- * Club domestic league appearances and goals

Bruno Barros di Pietro (born 15 June 1982), known as Bruno Barros, is a Brazilian football coach and former player who played as a left-back. He is the current head coach of Paracatu.

== Contract ==
- Villa Rio-RJ 1 January 2008 to 31 December 2011
