= Lecabela Quaresma =

Portuguese track and field athlete (born 1989)

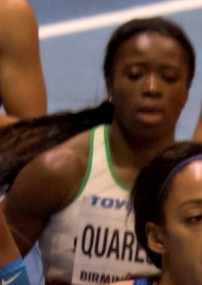
Quaresma in 2018

Lecabela Dias da Fonseca Quaresma (born 26 December 1989 in Água Grande) is a Portuguese track and field athlete who competes in the 100 metres hurdles and the combined events.

Earlier in her career she represented her birth country, São Tomé and Príncipe. She competed for that country in the 100 m hurdles event at the 2012 Summer Olympics. She was the flag bearer of São Tomé and Príncipe at the opening ceremony.

== Competition record ==
Year	Competition	Venue	Position	Event	Notes
Representing São Tomé and Príncipe
2008	World Junior Championships	Bydgoszcz, Poland	39th (h)	100 m hurdles	14.81 s (+1.2 m/s)
2009	Lusophony Games	Lisbon, Portugal	–	100 m hurdles	DNF
2009	Lusophony Games	Lisbon, Portugal	3rd	4 × 400 m relay	4:06.14
2009	Lusophony Games	Lisbon, Portugal	4th	Triple jump	13.07
2012	African Championships	Porto-Novo, Benin	14th (h)	100 m hurdles	15.59 s
2012	African Championships	Porto-Novo, Benin	6th	Triple jump	13.25 m
2012	Olympic Games	London, United Kingdom	42nd (h)	100 m hurdles	14.56 s
Representing Portugal
2014	Ibero-American Championships	São Paulo, Brazil	3rd	Heptathlon	5574 pts
2016	Ibero-American Championships	Rio de Janeiro, Brazil	4th	Heptathlon	5726 pts
2017	European Indoor Championships	Belgrade, Serbia	7th	Pentathlon	4444 pts
2017	World Championships	London, United Kingdom	22nd	Heptathlon	5788 pts
2018	World Indoor Championships	Birmingham, United Kingdom	8th	Pentathlon	4424 pts
2018	European Championships	Berlin, Germany	19th (q)	Triple jump	13.87 m
2018	European Championships	Berlin, Germany	16th	Heptathlon	5950 pts
2018	Ibero-American Championships	Trujillo, Peru	4th	Triple jump	13.24 m (w)

Olympic Games
Preceded by Celma Bonfim da Graça	Flagbearer for São Tomé and Príncipe; 2012 London	Succeeded by Buly Da Conceição Triste
