= Celma Bonfim da Graça =

São Toméan long-distance runner

Personal information
- Full name: Celma da Graça Soares Bonfim
- Nationality: Santomean
- Born: 23 December 1977 (age 48)
- Height: 1.70 m (5 ft 7 in)
- Weight: 50 kg (110 lb)

Sport
- Country: São Tomé and Príncipe
- Sport: Athletics
- Event: Long-distance running

Achievements and titles
- Personal best: 5000 m: 17:25.99 (2008)

Celma da Graça Soares Bonfim (born 23 December 1977) is a Santomean long-distance runner. Da Graça represented São Tomé and Príncipe at the 2008 Summer Olympics in Beijing, where she carried the nation's flag for her team during the opening ceremony. She ran in the first heat of the women's 5000 metres, against fifteen other athletes, including Ethiopia's Tirunesh Dibaba, who eventually won the gold medal in this event. She finished the race in last place by more than forty seconds behind Malawi's Lucia Chandamale, with her personal best and national record-breaking time of 17:25.99. Da Graça, however, failed to advance into the semi-finals, as she placed thirtieth overall, and was ranked farther below six mandatory slots for the next round. At the 2016 Summer Olympics, da Graça competed in the Women's 1500 metres, but finished 14th, last in her heat, with a time of 4:38.86, failing to advance to the semifinals.

At the 2006 Lusophony Games, Bonfim won a silver medal in the women's 5000 metres, with a time of 18:17.12. At the 2009 Lusophony Games, she competed in the Santomean team that won a bronze medal in the Women's 4x400 metres relay. She also finished fifth in the final of the 5,000 metres, with a time of 18:05.17.

At the 2004 African Championships in Athletics, Bonfim competed in the Women's 3000 metres steeplechase, where she finished fourth and last, with a time of 11:57.94. This was almost a minute and a half slower than the third-place finisher. However, she did set a national record.

Olympic Games
Preceded by Yazaldes Nascimento	Flagbearer for São Tomé and Príncipe; 2008 Beijing	Succeeded by Lecabela Quaresma
