= List of flag bearers for Ivory Coast at the Olympics =

Ivory Coast at the Olympics
- Flag of Ivory Coast
- IOC code: CIV
- NOC: Comité National Olympique de Côte d'Ivoire
- Medals: Gold 1 Silver 1 Bronze 3 Total 5

Summer appearances
- 1964; 1968; 1972; 1976; 1980; 1984; 1988; 1992; 1996; 2000; 2004; 2008; 2012; 2016; 2020; 2024

This is a list of flag bearers who have represented Ivory Coast at the Olympics.

Flag bearers carry the national flag of their country at the opening ceremony of the Olympic Games.

#	Event year	Season	Flag bearer	Sport
1	1964	Summer		
2	1968	Summer		
3	1972	Summer	Simbara Maki	Athletics
4	1976	Summer		
5	1984	Summer	Avognan Nogboun	Athletics
6	1988	Summer	René Djédjémél	Athletics
7	1992	Summer		
8	1996	Summer	Jean-Olivier Zirignon	Athletics
9	2000	Summer	Ibrahim Meité	Athletics
10	2004	Summer	Mariam Bah	Taekwondo
11	2008	Summer	Amandine Allou Affoue	Athletics
12	2012	Summer	Ben Youssef Meïté	Athletics
13	2016	Summer	Murielle Ahouré	Athletics
14	2020	Summer	Cheick Sallah Cissé	Taekwondo
14	2020	Summer	Marie-Josée Ta Lou	Athletics
15	2024	Summer	Cheick Sallah Cissé	Taekwondo
15	2024	Summer	Maboundou Koné	Athletics

== See also ==
- Ivory Coast at the Olympics
