= Taekwondo at the 2008 Summer Olympics – Women's 57 kg =

Taekwondo competition

Women's 57 kg at the Games of the XXIX Olympiad
- Venue: Beijing Science and Technology University Gymnasium
- Date: 21 August 2008
- Competitors: 16 from 16 nations

Medalists
1st place, gold medalist(s)		Lim Su-Jeong	South Korea
2nd place, silver medalist(s)		Azize Tanrıkulu	Turkey
3rd place, bronze medalist(s)		Diana López	United States
3rd place, bronze medalist(s)		Martina Zubčić	Croatia

The women's 57 kg competition in taekwondo at the 2008 Summer Olympics in Beijing took place on August 21 at the Beijing Science and Technology University Gymnasium.

== Competition format ==
The main bracket consisted of a single elimination tournament, culminating in the gold medal match. Two bronze medals were awarded at the taekwondo competitions. A repechage was used to determine the bronze medal winners. Every competitor who lost to one of the two finalists competed in the repechage, another single-elimination competition. Each semifinal loser faced the last remaining repechage competitor from the opposite half of the bracket in a bronze medal match.

== Schedule ==
All times are China standard time (UTC+8)

Date	Time	Round
Thursday, 21 August 2008	09:00; 15:00; 17:00; 20:00	Preliminary Round; Quarterfinals; Semifinals; Final

== Qualifying Athletes ==
Athlete	Country
Mariam Bah	Ivory Coast
Robin Cheong	New Zealand
Su Li-Wen	Chinese Taipei
Lim Su-Jeong	South Korea
Doris Patiño	Colombia
Veronica Calabrese	Italy
Nguyen Thi Hoai Thu	Vietnam
Bineta Diédhiou	Senegal
Diana López	United States
Chonnapas Premwaew	Thailand
Azize Tanrıkulu	Turkey
Elaine Teo	Malaysia
Martina Zubčić	Croatia
Bat-El Gatterer	Israel
Debora Nunes	Brazil
Lailatou Amadou Lele	Niger

== Results ==
Legend

- PTG — Won by points gap
- SUP — Won by superiority
- OT — Won on over time (Golden Point)

=== Main bracket ===
Preliminary round
1	Mariam Bah (CIV)	0
16	Robin Cheong (NZL)	1
8	Su Li-Wen (TPE)	0
9	Lim Su-Jeong (KOR)	1
5	Doris Patiño (COL)	0
12	Veronica Calabrese (ITA)	2
4	Nguyen Thi Hoai Thu (VIE)	0
13	Bineta Diédhiou (SEN)	1
6	Diana López (USA)	2
11	Chonnapas Premwaew (THA)	0
3	Azize Tanrıkulu (TUR)	7
14	Elaine Teo (MAS)	4
7	Martina Zubčić (CRO)	4
10	Bat-El Gatterer (ISR)	3
2	Debora Nunes (BRA)
15	Lailatou Amadou Lele (NIG)	DSQ

Quarterfinals
Robin Cheong (NZL)	1
Lim Su-Jeong (KOR)	4
Veronica Calabrese (ITA)	3
Bineta Diédhiou (SEN)	0
Diana López (USA)	1
Azize Tanrıkulu (TUR)	2
Martina Zubčić (CRO)	3
Debora Nunes (BRA)	2

Semifinals
Lim Su-Jeong (KOR)	5
Veronica Calabrese (ITA)	1
Azize Tanrıkulu (TUR)	5
Martina Zubčić (CRO)	3

Gold medal match
Lim Su-Jeong (KOR)	1
Azize Tanrıkulu (TUR)	0

=== Repechage ===
Round 1
Diana López (USA)	3
Elaine Teo (MAS)	0
Su Li-Wen (TPE)	1
Robin Cheong (NZL)	0

Bronze medal match
Diana López (USA)	3
Veronica Calabrese (ITA)	2
Martina Zubčić (CRO)	5
Su Li-Wen (TPE)	4
