= Croatia at the 2008 Summer Olympics =

- IOC code: CRO
- NOC: Croatian Olympic Committee
- Website: www.hoo.hr (in Croatian and English)

in Beijing
- Competitors: 99 in 15 sports
- Flag bearers: Ivano Balić (opening); Tamara Boroš (closing)
- Medals Ranked 56th: Gold 0 Silver 2 Bronze 3 Total 5

Summer Olympics appearances (overview)
- 1992; 1996; 2000; 2004; 2008; 2012; 2016; 2020; 2024

Other related appearances
- Austria (1900); Yugoslavia (1920–1988)

Croatia competed at the 2008 Summer Olympics in Beijing, People's Republic of China.

== Medalists ==
Medal	Name	Sport	Event
Silver	Filip Ude	Gymnastics	Men's pommel horse
Silver	Blanka Vlašić	Athletics	Women's high jump
Bronze	Snježana Pejčić	Shooting	Women's 10 m air rifle
Bronze	Sandra Šarić	Taekwondo	Women's 67 kg
Bronze	Martina Zubčić	Taekwondo	Women's 57 kg

== Athletics ==
Key

- Note–Ranks given for track events are within the athlete's heat only
- Q = Qualified for the next round
- q = Qualified for the next round as a fastest loser or, in field events, by position without achieving the qualifying target
- NR = National record
- N/A = Round not applicable for the event
- Bye = Athlete not required to compete in round

Men
Track & road events

Athlete	Event	Heat		Quarterfinal		Semifinal		Final	
Athlete	Event	Result	Rank	Result	Rank	Result	Rank	Result	Rank
Jurica Grabušić	110 m hurdles	14.18	7	Did not advance					

Field events

Athlete	Event	Qualification		Final	
Athlete	Event	Distance	Position	Distance	Position
András Haklits	Hammer throw	77.12	4 Q	76.58	10
Martin Marić	Discus throw	59.25	29	Did not advance	
Nedžad Mulabegović	Shot put	19.35	29	Did not advance	

Women
Track & road events

Athlete	Event	Heat		Semifinal		Final	
Athlete	Event	Result	Rank	Result	Rank	Result	Rank
Nikolina Horvat	400 m hurdles	56.65	6	Did not advance			
Vanja Perišić	800 m	~~2:06.82~~	DSQ*	Did not advance			

* Vanja Perišić of Croatia was later disqualified for failing an in-competition drugs test.

Field events

Athlete	Event	Qualification		Final	
Athlete	Event	Distance	Position	Distance	Position
Vera Begić	Discus throw	58.50	22	Did not advance	
Ivana Brkljačić	Hammer throw	68.38	16	Did not advance	
Sanja Gavrilović	Hammer throw	60.55	45	Did not advance	
Blanka Vlašić	High jump	1.93	6 Q	2.05	2nd place, silver medalist(s)

== Basketball ==
=== Men's tournament ===
Roster

The following is the Croatia roster in the men's basketball tournament of the 2008 Summer Olympics.

Croatia men's national basketball team – 2008 Summer Olympics roster
Players
Coaches

Pos.	No.	Name	Age – Date of birth	Height	Club	Ctr.
PG	4	Roko Ukić	23 – December 5, 1984	6 ft 5 in (1.96 m)	Toronto Raptors	(Canada)
G	5	Davor Kus	30 – July 21, 1978	6 ft 4 in (1.93 m)	Unicaja Málaga	(Spain)
PG	6	Marko Popović	26 – June 12, 1982	6 ft 1 in (1.85 m)	BC Žalgiris	(Lithuania)
SF	7	Marin Rozić	25 – February 14, 1983	6 ft 8 in (2.03 m)	KK Cibona	(Croatia)
F/C	8	Nikola Prkačin	32 – November 15, 1975	6 ft 10 in (2.08 m)	KK Cibona	(Croatia)
G/F	9	Marko Tomas	23 – January 3, 1985	6 ft 7 in (2.01 m)	Real Madrid	(Spain)
G	10	Zoran Planinić	25 – September 12, 1982	6 ft 6 in (1.98 m)	CSKA Moscow	(Russia)
C	11	Sandro Nicević	32 – June 16, 1976	6 ft 11 in (2.11 m)	Beşiktaş	(Turkey)
F	12	Damjan Rudež	22 – June 17, 1986	6 ft 10 in (2.08 m)	KK Union Olimpija	(Slovenia)
PF	13	Marko Banić	23 – August 31, 1984	6 ft 9 in (2.06 m)	iurbentia Bilbao	(Spain)
PF	14	Krešimir Lončar	25 – February 12, 1983	6 ft 11 in (2.11 m)	Lokomotiv Rostov	(Russia)
C	15	Stanko Barać	21 – August 13, 1986	7 ft 1 in (2.16 m)	TAU Ceramica	(Spain)

Head coach

- (Croatia) Jasmin Repeša

Assistant coach(es)

- (Croatia) Dražen Anzulović

Legend

- (C) Team captain
- Club – describes last
  club before the tournament
- Age – describes age
  on August 9, 2008

Group play

Pos	Team	Pld	W	L	PF	PA	PD	Pts	Qualification
1	Lithuania	5	4	1	425	400	+25	9 (Note: Head-to-head record: Lithuania 1–0 Argentina)	Quarterfinals
2	Argentina	5	4	1	425	361	+64	9	Quarterfinals
3	Croatia	5	3	2	399	380	+19	8 (Note: Head-to-head record: Croatia 1–0 Australia)	Quarterfinals
4	Australia	5	3	2	457	405	+52	8	Quarterfinals
5	Russia	5	1	4	387	406	−19	6	
6	Iran	5	0	5	323	464	−141	5	

Source: FIBA archive
Rules for classification: 1) points; 2) head-to-head points; 3) head-to-head goal average; 4) head-to-head number of points scored.
Notes:

10 August 2008
20:00

Report

Australia	82–97	Croatia
Scoring by quarter: 14–21, 17–26, 22–26, 29–24
Pts: Nielsen 13; Rebs: Anstey 7 Asts: Barlow 3		Pts: Prkačin, Banić 16; Rebs: Lončar 10; Asts: Popović 5

Wukesong Indoor Stadium, Beijing
Attendance: 11,083
Referees: Eddie Rush (USA)

12 August 2008
11:15

Report

Croatia	85–78	Russia
Scoring by quarter: 16–17, 26–19, 18–15, 25–27
Pts: Popović 22; Rebs: Barać 7 Asts: Popović, Lončar 3		Pts: Kirilenko 18; Rebs: Kirilenko 6 Asts: Kirilenko, Bikov 3

Wukesong Indoor Stadium, Beijing
Attendance: 11,083
Referees: Nikolaos Zavlanos (GRE)

14 August 2008
22:15

Report

Argentina	77–53	Croatia
Scoring by quarter: 21–13, 19–9, 19–16, 18–15
Pts: Nocioni 18; Rebs: Nocioni 8 Asts: Ginobili 8		Pts: Tomas, Banić 9 Rebs: Banić 6 Asts: Ukić 2

Wukesong Indoor Stadium, Beijing
Attendance: 11,083
Referees: Juan Carlos Arteaga (ESP)

16 August 2008
14:30

Report

Croatia	73–86	Lithuania
Scoring by quarter: 15–13, 30–29, 17–16, 11–28
Pts: Ukić 13; Rebs: Banić 7 Asts: Kus 3		Pts: Lukauskis 20; Rebs: K. Lavrinovič 7 Asts: Jasikevičius 6

Wukesong Indoor Stadium, Beijing
Attendance: 11,083
Referees: Nikolaos Zavlanos (GRE)

18 August 2008
09:00

Report

Iran	57–91	Croatia
Scoring by quarter: 8–19, 8–35, 23–16, 18–21
Pts: Nikkhah 25; Rebs: Haddadi 15; Asts: Haddadi 2		Pts: Rozić, Tomas 16; Rebs: Lončar, Barać 7 Asts: Ukić 8

Wukesong Indoor Stadium, Beijing
Attendance: 11,083
Referees: Carl Jungebrand (FIN)

Quarterfinals

20 August 2008
14:30

Report

Spain	72–59	Croatia
Scoring by quarter: 22–11, 15–15, 14–12, 21–21
Scoring by half: 37–26, 35–33
Pts: P. Gasol 20; Rebs: P. Gasol 10; Asts: Calderón, P. Gasol 2		Pts: Banić 15; Rebs: Banić, Planinić 5 Asts: Kus, Nicević 2

Wukesong Indoor Stadium, Beijing
Attendance: 11,083
Referees: Nikolaos Zavlanos (GRE)

== Boxing ==
Athlete	Event	Round of 32	Round of 16	Quarterfinals	Semifinals	Final	
Athlete	Event	Opposition Result	Opposition Result	Opposition Result	Opposition Result	Opposition Result	Rank
Marijo Šivolija	Light heavyweight	Tavui (SAM); W RSC	Kurbanov (TJK); L 1–8	Did not advance			
Marko Tomasović	Super heavyweight	—	Cammarelle (ITA); L 1–13	Did not advance			

== Canoeing ==
=== Slalom ===
Athlete	Event	Preliminary						Semifinal		Final			
Athlete	Event	Run 1	Rank	Run 2	Rank	Total	Rank	Time	Rank	Time	Rank	Total	Rank
Emir Mujčinović	Men's C-1	95.41	15	93.90	15	189.31	15	Did not advance					

=== Sprint ===
Athlete	Event	Heats		Semifinals		Final	
Athlete	Event	Time	Rank	Time	Rank	Time	Rank
Stjepan Janić	Men's K-1 500 m	1:37.724	3 QS	1:41.689	1 Q	1:38.729	9
Stjepan Janić	Men's K-1 1000 m	3:31.369	2 QS	3:33.942	2 Q	3:30.495	7

Qualification Legend: QS = Qualify to semi-final; QF = Qualify directly to final

== Cycling ==
=== Road ===
Athlete	Event	Time	Rank
Matija Kvasina	Men's road race	6:34:26	56
Matija Kvasina	Men's time trial	1:09:06	38
Vladimir Miholjević	Men's road race	Did not finish	
Radoslav Rogina	Men's road race	6:26:17	25

== Gymnastics ==
=== Artistic ===
Men

Athlete	Event	Qualification								Final							
Athlete	Event	Apparatus						Total	Rank	Apparatus						Total	Rank
Athlete	Event	F	PH	R	V	PB	HB	Total	Rank	F	PH	R	V	PB	HB	Total	Rank
Filip Ude	Floor	14.775	—					14.775	41	Did not advance							
Filip Ude	Pommel horse	—	15.475	—				15.475	3 Q	—	15.725	—				15.725	2nd place, silver medalist(s)

Women

Athlete	Event	Qualification						Final					
Athlete	Event	Apparatus				Total	Rank	Apparatus				Total	Rank
Athlete	Event	F	V	UB	BB	Total	Rank	F	V	UB	BB	Total	Rank
Tina Erceg	All-around	13.700	13.650	11.825	14.075	53.250	57	Did not advance					

== Handball ==
=== Men's tournament ===
Roster

The following is the Croatia roster in the men's handball tournament of the 2008 Summer Olympics.

Head coach: Lino Cervar

No.	Pos.	Name	Date of birth (age)	Height	App.	Goals	Club
1	GK	Venio Losert	25 July 1976 (aged 32)	1.91 m	149	0	(Spain) FC Barcelona Handbol
3	P	Renato Sulić	12 October 1979 (aged 28)	1.97 m	95	233	(Slovenia) RK Celje
4	CB	Ivano Balić	1 April 1979 (aged 29)	1.90 m	132	420	(Spain) SDC San Antonio
5	CB	Domagoj Duvnjak	1 June 1988 (aged 20)	1.97 m	19	34	(Croatia) RK Zagreb
6	LB	Blaženko Lacković	25 December 1980 (aged 27)	1.95 m	111	340	(Germany) SG Flensburg-Handewitt
9	P	Igor Vori	20 September 1980 (aged 27)	2.02 m	103	257	(Croatia) RK Zagreb
10	CB	Davor Dominiković	7 April 1978 (aged 30)	2.03 m	147	177	(Spain) SDC San Antonio
11	RW	Mirza Džomba	28 February 1977 (aged 31)	1.90 m	173	667	(Croatia) RK Zagreb
13	RW	Zlatko Horvat	25 September 1984 (aged 23)	1.79 m	35	65	(Croatia) RK Zagreb
14	CB	Drago Vuković	3 August 1983 (aged 25)	1.94 m	53	50	(Slovenia) RK Gorenje
17	LW	Goran Šprem	6 July 1979 (aged 29)	1.83 m	96	241	(Germany) HSG Nordhorn
19	RB	Petar Metličić	25 December 1976 (aged 31)	1.94 m	152	338	(Spain) BM Ciudad Real
23	LW	Ljubo Vukić	3 August 1982 (aged 26)	1.91 m	29	38	(Croatia) RK Zagreb
24	LB	Tonči Valčić	9 June 1978 (aged 30)	1.94 m	92	141	(Spain) CB Ademar León
25	GK	Mirko Alilović	15 September 1985 (aged 22)	2.00 m	25	0	(Spain) CB Ademar León

Group play

Team	Pld	W	D	L	GF	GA	GD	Pts	Qualification
France	5	4	1	0	148	115	+33	9	Qualified for the quarterfinals
Poland	5	3	1	1	147	128	+19	7	Qualified for the quarterfinals
Croatia	5	3	0	2	140	115	+25	6	Qualified for the quarterfinals
Spain	5	3	0	2	152	145	+7	6	Qualified for the quarterfinals
Brazil	5	1	0	4	129	153	−24	2	
China	5	0	0	5	104	164	−60	0	

10 August 2008; 09:00	Croatia	31 – 29	Spain	Olympic Sports Centre Gymnasium; Referees: Lemme, Ulrich (GER)
10 August 2008; 09:00	Lacković, Džomba 5	(16–11)	García 5	Olympic Sports Centre Gymnasium; Referees: Lemme, Ulrich (GER)
10 August 2008; 09:00	4× (yellow card) 4× (suspension)	Report	3× (yellow card) 3× (suspension)	Olympic Sports Centre Gymnasium; Referees: Lemme, Ulrich (GER)

12 August 2008; 09:00	Brazil	14 – 33	Croatia	Olympic Sports Centre Gymnasium; Referees: Gjeding, Hansen (DEN)
12 August 2008; 09:00	Ertel, Souza 3	(9–18)	Džomba 7	Olympic Sports Centre Gymnasium; Referees: Gjeding, Hansen (DEN)
12 August 2008; 09:00	3× (yellow card) 4× (suspension)	Report	2× (yellow card) 3× (suspension)	Olympic Sports Centre Gymnasium; Referees: Gjeding, Hansen (DEN)

14 August 2008; 20:45	France	23 – 19	Croatia	Olympic Sports Centre Gymnasium; Referees: Chernega, Paladenko (RUS)
14 August 2008; 20:45	Gille 7	(11–9)	Džomba 5	Olympic Sports Centre Gymnasium; Referees: Chernega, Paladenko (RUS)
14 August 2008; 20:45	3× (yellow card) 2× (suspension)	Report	3× (yellow card) 4× (suspension)	Olympic Sports Centre Gymnasium; Referees: Chernega, Paladenko (RUS)

16 August 2008; 19:00	Croatia	24 – 27	Poland	Olympic Sports Centre Gymnasium; Referees: Gjeding, Hansen (DEN)
16 August 2008; 19:00	Džomba 7	(12–13)	Tłuczyński 7	Olympic Sports Centre Gymnasium; Referees: Gjeding, Hansen (DEN)
16 August 2008; 19:00	3× (yellow card) 2× (suspension)	Report	2× (yellow card) 2× (suspension)	Olympic Sports Centre Gymnasium; Referees: Gjeding, Hansen (DEN)

18 August 2008; 15:45	Croatia	33 – 22	China	Olympic Sports Centre Gymnasium; Referees: Karbaschi, Kolahdouzan (IRI)
18 August 2008; 15:45	Šprem 8	(17–13)	Hao 6	Olympic Sports Centre Gymnasium; Referees: Karbaschi, Kolahdouzan (IRI)
18 August 2008; 15:45	2× (yellow card) 3× (suspension)	Report	3× (yellow card) 1× (suspension) 1× (red card)	Olympic Sports Centre Gymnasium; Referees: Karbaschi, Kolahdouzan (IRI)

Quarterfinal

20 August 2008; 18:00	Denmark	24 – 26	Croatia	Olympic Sports Centre Gymnasium; Referees: Breto, Huelin (ESP)
20 August 2008; 18:00	Christiansen 6	(14–12)	Šprem 7	Olympic Sports Centre Gymnasium; Referees: Breto, Huelin (ESP)
20 August 2008; 18:00	2× (yellow card) 2× (suspension)	Report	2× (yellow card) 4× (suspension)	Olympic Sports Centre Gymnasium; Referees: Breto, Huelin (ESP)

Semifinal

22 August 2008; 18:00	France	25 – 23	Croatia	Beijing National Indoor Stadium; Referees: Chernega, Poladenko (RUS)
22 August 2008; 18:00	Burdet, Narcisse 6	(12–11)	Horvat, Šprem 5	Beijing National Indoor Stadium; Referees: Chernega, Poladenko (RUS)
22 August 2008; 18:00	4× (yellow card) 4× (suspension)	Report	3× (yellow card) 3× (suspension)	Beijing National Indoor Stadium; Referees: Chernega, Poladenko (RUS)

Bronze medal game

24 August 2008; 13:30	Croatia	29 – 35	Spain	Beijing National Indoor Stadium; Referees: Din, Dinu (ROU)
24 August 2008; 13:30	Duvnjak 7	(14–12)	García, Prieto 7	Beijing National Indoor Stadium; Referees: Din, Dinu (ROU)
24 August 2008; 13:30	3× (yellow card) 4× (suspension)	Report	3× (yellow card) 5× (suspension)	Beijing National Indoor Stadium; Referees: Din, Dinu (ROU)

== Rowing ==
Men

Athlete	Event	Heats		Repechage		Semifinals		Final	
Athlete	Event	Time	Rank	Time	Rank	Time	Rank	Time	Rank
Nikša Skelin; Siniša Skelin	Pair	7:16.35	4 R	6:38.30	2 SA/B	7:14.50	6 FB	7:12.19	12
Ante Kušurin; Mario Vekić	Double sculls	6:27.38	2 SA/B	Bye		6:24.89	4 FB	DNS	12

Qualification Legend: FA=Final A (medal); FB=Final B (non-medal); FC=Final C (non-medal); FD=Final D (non-medal); FE=Final E (non-medal); FF=Final F (non-medal); SA/B=Semifinals A/B; SC/D=Semifinals C/D; SE/F=Semifinals E/F; QF=Quarterfinals; R=Repechage

== Sailing ==
Men

Athlete	Event	Race											Net points	Final rank
Athlete	Event	1	2	3	4	5	6	7	8	9	10	M*	Net points	Final rank
Luka Mratović	RS:X	29	32	~~34~~	33	34	34	20	23	32	29	EL	265	32
Luka Radelić	Laser	~~26~~	15	7	21	1	21	3	16	17	CAN	EL	101	12
Šime Fantela; Igor Marenić	470	18	6	9	~~30~~; ~~OCS~~	12	17	6	7	15	1	8	107	9
Marin Lovrović, Jr. Siniša Mikuličić	Star	~~15~~	5	14	13	4	14	4	14	15	15	EL	98	15

Women

Athlete	Event	Race											Net points	Final rank
Athlete	Event	1	2	3	4	5	6	7	8	9	10	M*	Net points	Final rank
Mateja Petronijević	Laser Radial	8	9	5	4	19	19	13	21	~~22~~	CAN	EL	98	11

Open

Athlete	Event	Race																Net points	Final rank
Athlete	Event	1	2	3	4	5	6	7	8	9	10	11	12	13	14	15	M*	Net points	Final rank
Ivan Kljaković Gašpić	Finn	7	10	10	8	~~16~~	9	1	13	18	CAN	CAN	—					76	8
Petar Cupać; Pavle Kostov	49er	14	16	16	18	~~20~~; ~~OCS~~	11	9	19	18	10	17	10	CAN	CAN	CAN	EL	158	17

M = Medal race; EL = Eliminated – did not advance into the medal race; CAN = Race cancelled; OCS = On the course side of the starting line

== Shooting ==
Men

Athlete	Event	Qualification		Final	
Athlete	Event	Points	Rank	Points	Rank
Josip Glasnović	Trap	119 S/O 3	6 Q	140 S/O 2	5
Petar Gorša	10 m air rifle	588	37	Did not advance	
Petar Gorša	50 m rifle prone	583	49	Did not advance	
Petar Gorša	50 m rifle 3 positions	1148	44	Did not advance	

Women

Athlete	Event	Qualification		Final	
Athlete	Event	Points	Rank	Points	Rank
Snježana Pejčić	10 m air rifle	399	3 Q	500.9	3rd place, bronze medalist(s)
Snježana Pejčić	50 m rifle 3 positions	576	26	Did not advance	
Suzana Cimbal Špirelja	10 m air rifle	393	30	Did not advance	
Suzana Cimbal Špirelja	50 m rifle 3 positions	580	12	Did not advance	

== Swimming ==
Men

Athlete	Event	Heat		Semifinal		Final	
Athlete	Event	Time	Rank	Time	Rank	Time	Rank
Duje Draganja	50 m freestyle	22.05	12 Q	21.85	10	Did not advance	
Duje Draganja	100 m freestyle	49.49	34	Did not advance			
Saša Imprić	200 m individual medley	2:01.83	29	Did not advance			
Gordan Kožulj	100 m backstroke	55.05	24	Did not advance			
Gordan Kožulj	200 m backstroke	1:57.81	8 Q	1:59.22	14	Did not advance	
Alexei Puninski	100 m butterfly	53.65	47	Did not advance			
Vanja Rogulj	100 m breaststroke	1:02.42	42	Did not advance			
Nikša Roki	200 m butterfly	1:59.58 NR	31	Did not advance			
Nikša Roki	400 m individual medley	4:22.44 NR	23	—		Did not advance	
Marko Strahija	100 m backstroke	55.89	34	Did not advance			
Dominik Straga	200 m freestyle	1:49.63 NR	37	Did not advance			
Mario Todorović	100 m butterfly	52.26 NR	20	Did not advance			
Duje Draganja; Gordan Kožulj; Vanja Rogulj; Mario Todorović	4 × 100 m medley relay	3:37.69	12	—		Did not advance	

Women

Athlete	Event	Heat		Semifinal		Final	
Athlete	Event	Time	Rank	Time	Rank	Time	Rank
Monika Babok	50 m freestyle	26.84	49	Did not advance			
Sanja Jovanović	100 m backstroke	1:01.30	22	Did not advance			
Sanja Jovanović	200 m backstroke	2:15.57	31	Did not advance			
Smiljana Marinović	100 m breaststroke	1:10.94	33	Did not advance			
Smiljana Marinović	200 m breaststroke	2:32.80	34	Did not advance			
Anja Trišić	200 m freestyle	2:03.57	42	Did not advance			

== Table tennis ==
Singles

Athlete	Event	Preliminary round	Round 1	Round 2	Round 3	Round 4	Quarterfinals	Semifinals	Final / BM	
Athlete	Event	Opposition Result	Opposition Result	Opposition Result	Opposition Result	Opposition Result	Opposition Result	Opposition Result	Opposition Result	Rank
Zoran Primorac	Men's singles	Bye		Gardos (AUT); W 4–2	Maze (DEN); W 4–2	Yang Z (SIN); W 4–2	Persson (SWE); L 1–4	Did not advance		
Tan Ruiwu	Men's singles	Bye		Kishikawa (JPN); W 4–1	Gao N (SIN); W 4–0	Li C (HKG); W 4–2	Wang Lq (CHN); L 0–4	Did not advance		
Andrea Bakula	Women's singles	Silva (MEX); W 4–0	Huang I-h (TPE); L 1–4	Did not advance						
Tamara Boroš	Women's singles	Bye		Stefanova (ITA); W 4–1	Li Jw (SIN); L 1–4	Did not advance				
Sandra Paović	Women's singles	Bye	Lay J F (AUS); W 4–3	Shen Yf (ESP); L 2–4	Did not advance					

Team

Athlete	Event	Group round		Semifinals	Bronze playoff 1	Bronze playoff 2	Bronze medal	Final	
Athlete	Event	Opposition Result	Rank	Opposition Result	Opposition Result	Opposition Result	Opposition Result	Opposition Result	Rank
Andrej Gaćina; Zoran Primorac; Tan Ruiwu	Men's team	Group B Germany; L 0 – 3 Singapore; W 3 – 1 Canada; W 3 – 0	2	Did not advance	Austria; L 1 – 3	Did not advance			
Andrea Bakula; Tamara Boroš; Sandra Paović	Women's team	Group A China; L 0 – 3 Austria; L 0 – 3 Dominican Republic; W 3 – 1	3	Did not advance					

== Taekwondo ==
Athlete	Event	Round of 16	Quarterfinals	Semifinals	Repechage	Bronze Medal	Final	
Athlete	Event	Opposition Result	Opposition Result	Opposition Result	Opposition Result	Opposition Result	Opposition Result	Rank
Martina Zubčić	Women's −57 kg	Gatterer (ISR); W 4–3	Nunes (BRA); W 3–2	Tanrıkulu (TUR); L 3–5	Bye	Su L-w (TPE); W 5–4	Did not advance	3rd place, bronze medalist(s)
Sandra Šarić	Women's −67 kg	Rivero (PHI); W 4–1	Hwang K-S (KOR); L 1–3	Did not advance	Al-Maktoum (UAE); W 4–0	Ocasio (PUR); W 5–1	Did not advance	3rd place, bronze medalist(s)

== Tennis ==
Athlete	Event	Round of 64	Round of 32	Round of 16	Quarterfinals	Semifinals	Final / BM	
Athlete	Event	Opposition Score	Opposition Score	Opposition Score	Opposition Score	Opposition Score	Opposition Score	Rank
Marin Čilić	Men's singles	Mónaco (ARG); W 6–4, 6–7^{(5–7)}, 6–3	González (CHI); L 4–6, 2–6	Did not advance				
Ivo Karlović	Men's singles	Withdrew due to illness on 8 August 2008						
Ivan Ljubičić	Men's singles	Withdrew due to injury on 9 August 2008						
Ivan Ljubičić; Marin Čilić	Men's doubles	Withdrew from the doubles tournament due to Ljubičić's recurring injury on 10 August 2008						

== Water polo ==
Croatia participated in the men's tournament, where the team finished in 6th place.

=== Men's tournament ===
Roster

The following is the Croatian roster in the men's water polo tournament of the 2008 Summer Olympics.

№	Name	Pos.	Height	Weight	Date of birth	Club
1	Frano Vićan	GK	1.92 m (6 ft 4 in)	94 kg (207 lb)	24 January 1976	(Croatia) VK Jug Dubrovnik
2	Damir Burić	CB	2.05 m (6 ft 9 in)	115 kg (254 lb)	2 December 1980	(Croatia) HAVK Mladost
3	Andro Bušlje	CB	1.99 m (6 ft 6 in)	105 kg (231 lb)	4 January 1986	(Croatia) VK Jug Dubrovnik
4	Zdeslav Vrdoljak	D	1.89 m (6 ft 2 in)	96 kg (212 lb)	15 March 1971	(Croatia) HAVK Mladost
5	Aljoša Kunac	CB	1.97 m (6 ft 6 in)	100 kg (220 lb)	18 August 1980	(Montenegro) Cattaro Kotor
6	Maro Joković	D	2.03 m (6 ft 8 in)	95 kg (209 lb)	1 October 1987	(Croatia) VK Jug Dubrovnik
7	Mile Smodlaka	CF	1.98 m (6 ft 6 in)	115 kg (254 lb)	1 January 1976	(Croatia) VK Jug Dubrovnik
8	Teo Đogaš	D	1.87 m (6 ft 2 in)	90 kg (200 lb)	19 February 1977	(Montenegro) Cattaro Kotor
9	Pavo Marković	D	1.90 m (6 ft 3 in)	92 kg (203 lb)	20 April 1985	(Croatia) VK Jug Dubrovnik
10	Samir Barač	D	1.88 m (6 ft 2 in)	95 kg (209 lb)	2 November 1973	(Croatia) Primorje EB
11	Igor Hinić	CF	2.02 m (6 ft 8 in)	110 kg (240 lb)	4 December 1975	(Croatia) HAVK Mladost
12	Miho Bošković	D	1.96 m (6 ft 5 in)	96 kg (212 lb)	11 January 1983	(Croatia) VK Jug Dubrovnik
13	Josip Pavić	GK	1.96 m (6 ft 5 in)	92 kg (203 lb)	15 January 1982	(Croatia) HAVK Mladost

Head coach: Ratko Rudić

Group play

Team	Pld	W	D	L	GF	GA	GD	Pts	Qualification
United States	5	4	0	1	37	31	+6	8	Qualified for the semifinals
Croatia	5	4	0	1	56	31	+25	8	Qualified for the quarterfinals
Serbia	5	3	0	2	50	38	+12	6	Qualified for the quarterfinals
Germany	5	2	0	3	33	44	−11	4	Will play for places 7–10
Italy	5	2	0	3	57	50	+7	4	Will play for places 7–12
China	5	0	0	5	25	64	−39	0	Will play for places 7–12

- United States is placed above Croatia due to their head-to-head record.

All times are China Standard Time (UTC+8).

10 August 2008; 15:20	Report	Croatia	11–7	Italy	Ying Tung Natatorium, Beijing; Referees: Simion (ROU), Antsiferov (RUS)
10 August 2008; 15:20	Report	Score by quarters: 3–3, 2–0, 4–1, 2–3			Ying Tung Natatorium, Beijing; Referees: Simion (ROU), Antsiferov (RUS)
10 August 2008; 15:20	Report	Bošković 3, Bušlje 2, Marković 2	Goals	Felugo 3, Calcaterra 2	Ying Tung Natatorium, Beijing; Referees: Simion (ROU), Antsiferov (RUS)

12 August 2008; 15:20	Report	Serbia	8–11	Croatia	Ying Tung Natatorium, Beijing; Referees: Turcotte (CAN), Klopper (NED)
12 August 2008; 15:20	Report	Score by quarters: 3–1, 1–4, 1–4, 3–2			Ying Tung Natatorium, Beijing; Referees: Turcotte (CAN), Klopper (NED)
12 August 2008; 15:20	Report	Šapić 4, Udovičić 2	Goals	Joković 3, Barač 3, Smodlaka 2	Ying Tung Natatorium, Beijing; Referees: Turcotte (CAN), Klopper (NED)

14 August 2008; 9:30	Report	Croatia	13–5	Germany	Ying Tung Natatorium, Beijing; Referees: Moliner Molins (ESP), Argyros (GRE)
14 August 2008; 9:30	Report	Score by quarters: 4–1, 3–2, 2–1, 4–1			Ying Tung Natatorium, Beijing; Referees: Moliner Molins (ESP), Argyros (GRE)
14 August 2008; 9:30	Report	Burić 3, Joković 2, Smodlaka 2, Marković 2, Bošković 2	Goals	Politze 2	Ying Tung Natatorium, Beijing; Referees: Moliner Molins (ESP), Argyros (GRE)

16 August 2008; 12:10	Report	Croatia	5–7	United States	Ying Tung Natatorium, Beijing; Referees: Simion (ROU), Antsiferov (RUS)
16 August 2008; 12:10	Report	Score by quarters: 2–2, 1–3, 0–0, 2–2			Ying Tung Natatorium, Beijing; Referees: Simion (ROU), Antsiferov (RUS)
16 August 2008; 12:10	Report	Đogaš 2	Goals	Azevedo 3	Ying Tung Natatorium, Beijing; Referees: Simion (ROU), Antsiferov (RUS)

18 August 2008; 16:40	Report	China	4–16	Croatia	Ying Tung Natatorium, Beijing
18 August 2008; 16:40	Report	Score by quarters: 0–4, 0–3, 1–1, 3–8			Ying Tung Natatorium, Beijing
18 August 2008; 16:40	Report	Wu 2	Goals	Barač 4, Joković 3, Đogaš 2, Marković 2, Hinić 2	Ying Tung Natatorium, Beijing

Quarterfinal

20 August 2008; 16:00	Report	Montenegro	7–6	Croatia	Ying Tung Natatorium, Beijing; Referees: Tulga (TUR), Bock (GER)
20 August 2008; 16:00	Report	Score by quarters: 3–1, 2–3, 1–0, 1–2			Ying Tung Natatorium, Beijing; Referees: Tulga (TUR), Bock (GER)
20 August 2008; 16:00	Report	N. Janović 2, Ivović 2, Gojković 2	Goals	Hinić 2	Ying Tung Natatorium, Beijing; Referees: Tulga (TUR), Bock (GER)

Classification round (5th–6th place)

24 August 2008; 13:00	Report	Croatia	9–11	Spain	Ying Tung Natatorium, Beijing; Referees: Chaney (USA), Kiszelly (HUN)
24 August 2008; 13:00	Report	Score by quarters: 2–0, 3–5, 1–3, 3–3			Ying Tung Natatorium, Beijing; Referees: Chaney (USA), Kiszelly (HUN)
24 August 2008; 13:00	Report	Bušlje 2, Đogaš 2	Goals	X. García 4, Minguell 3, F. Perrone 2	Ying Tung Natatorium, Beijing; Referees: Chaney (USA), Kiszelly (HUN)

== See also ==
- Croatia at the 2008 Summer Paralympics
