= Ivory Coast at the 2008 Summer Olympics =

- Flag of Ivory Coast
- IOC code: CIV
- NOC: National Olympic Committee of Ivory Coast

in Beijing
- Competitors: 21 in 5 sports
- Flag bearer: Affoue Amandine Allou
- Medals: Gold 0 Silver 0 Bronze 0 Total 0

Summer Olympics appearances (overview)
- 1964; 1968; 1972; 1976; 1980; 1984; 1988; 1992; 1996; 2000; 2004; 2008; 2012; 2016; 2020; 2024

The Ivory Coast was represented at the 2008 Summer Olympics in Beijing, China by the National Olympic Committee of Ivory Coast.

In total, 21 athletes including 19 men and two women represented the Ivory Coast in five different sports including athletics, canoeing, football, swimming and taekwondo.

== Competitors ==
In total, 21 athletes represented Ivory Coast at the 2008 Summer Olympics in Beijing, China across five different sports.

Sport	Men	Women	Total
Athletics	0	1	1
Canoeing	1	0	1
Football	18	0	18
Swimming	1	0	1
Taekwondo	1	1	2
Total	19	2	21

== Athletics ==
In total, one Ivorian athlete participated in the athletics events – Affoué Amandine Allou in the women's 100 m.

The heats for the women's 100 m took place on 16 August 2008. Allou finished fifth in her heat in a time of 11.75 seconds and she did not advance to the quarter-finals.

Athlete	Event	Heat		Quarterfinal		Semifinal		Final	
Athlete	Event	Result	Rank	Result	Rank	Result	Rank	Result	Rank
Affoué Amandine Allou	100 m	11.75	5	Did not advance					

== Canoeing ==
In total, one Ivorian athlete participated in the canoeing events – Kotoua Francis Abia in the men's K-1 500 m and the men's K-1 1,000 m.

The heats for the men's K-1 1,000 m took place on 18 August 2008. Abia finished eighth in his heat in a time of four minutes 14.411 seconds and he did not advance to the semi-final.

The heats for the men's K-1 500 m took place on 19 August 2008. Abia finished seventh in his heat in a time of two minutes 0.716 seconds and he did not advance to the semi-final.

Athlete	Event	Heats		Semifinals		Final	
Athlete	Event	Time	Rank	Time	Rank	Time	Rank
Kotoua Francis Abia	Men's K-1 500 m	2:00.716	7	Did not advance			
Kotoua Francis Abia	Men's K-1 1,000 m	4:14.411	8	Did not advance			

== Football ==
In total, 18 Ivorian athletes participated in the football events – Mamadou Bagayoko, Souleymane Bamba, Angoua Brou Benjamin, Sekou Cissé, Kafoumba Coulibaly, Franck Dja Djedje, Gervinho, Abraham Guié, Salomon Kalou, Hervé Kambou, Emmanuel Koné, Anthony Moura-Komenan, Christian Fabrice Okoua, Antoine N'Gossan, Vincent de Paul Angban, Mekeme Tamla Ladji, Diarrasouba Viera and Serge Wawa in the men's competition.

Group play

Pos	Team	Pld	W	D	L	GF	GA	GD	Pts	Qualification
1	Argentina	3	3	0	0	5	1	+4	9	Qualified for the quarterfinals
2	Ivory Coast	3	2	0	1	6	4	+2	6	Qualified for the quarterfinals
3	Australia	3	0	1	2	1	3	−2	1	
4	Serbia	3	0	1	2	3	7	−4	1	

7 August 2008
19:45

Ivory Coast	1–2	Argentina
Cissé 53'	Report	Messi 43'; Acosta 86'

Shanghai Stadium, Shanghai
Attendance: 43,266
Referee: Wolfgang Stark (Germany)
10 August 2008
19:45

Serbia	2–4	Ivory Coast
Mrdaković 16'; Rakić 90'	Report	Cissé 3'; Rajković 24' (o.g.); Kalou 70'; Gervinho 90+3'

Shanghai Stadium, Shanghai
Attendance: 38,320
Referee: Roberto Moreno (Panama)
13 August 2008
19:45

Ivory Coast	1–0	Australia
Kalou 81'	Report

Tianjin Olympic Center Stadium, Tianjin
Attendance: 50,437
Referee: Jair Marrufo (United States)

Quarterfinals

16 August 2008
21:00

Nigeria	2–0	Ivory Coast
Odemwingie 44'; Obinna 82' (pen.)	Report

Qinhuangdao Olympic Sports Center Stadium, Qinhuangdao
Attendance: 28,944
Referee: Masoud Moradi (Iran)

== Swimming ==
In total, one Ivorian athlete participated in the Swimming events – Kouassi Brou in the men's 50 m freestyle.

The heats for the men's 50 m freestyle took place on 14 August 2008. Brou finished eighth in his heat in a time of 26.08 seconds which was ultimately not fast enough to advance to the semi-finals.

Athlete	Event	Heat		Semifinal		Final	
Athlete	Event	Time	Rank	Time	Rank	Time	Rank
Kouassi Brou	50 m freestyle	26.08	76	Did not advance			

== Taekwondo ==
In total, two Ivorian athletes participated in the Taekwondo events – Mariam Bah in the women's −57 kg Category and Sebastien Konan in the men's −80 kg category.

The women's −57 kg category took place on 21 August 2008. In the first round, Bah lost to Robin Cheong of New Zealand.

The men's −80 kg category took place on 22 August 2008. In the first round, Konan lost to Mauro Sarmiento of Italy. In the repechage, he lost to Steven López of the United States.

Athlete	Event	Round of 16	Quarterfinals	Semifinals	Repechage	Bronze Medal	Final	
Athlete	Event	Opposition Result	Opposition Result	Opposition Result	Opposition Result	Opposition Result	Opposition Result	Rank
Sebastien Konan	Men's −80 kg	Sarmiento (ITA); L 1–4	Did not advance		S. López (USA); L 0–3	Did not advance		
Mariam Bah	Women's −57 kg	Cheong (NZL); L 0–1	Did not advance					
