= 2009 World Taekwondo Championships – Women's featherweight =

Women's featherweight at the 2009 World Championships
- Venue: Ballerup Super Arena
- Dates: 15 October 2009
- Competitors: 55 from 55 nations

Medalists
gold medal	Hou Yuzhuo	China
silver medal	Veronica Calabrese	Italy
bronze medal	Andrea Rica	Spain
bronze medal	Tseng Pei-hua	Chinese Taipei

The Women's featherweight is a competition featured at the 2011 World Taekwondo Championships, and was held at the Ballerup Super Arena in Copenhagen, Denmark on October 15. Featherweights were limited to a maximum of 57 kilograms in body mass.

== Results ==
Legend

- DQ — Won by disqualification

=== Finals ===
Semifinals		Final
Andrea Rica (ESP)	0
Veronica Calabrese (ITA)	1	Veronica Calabrese (ITA)	1
Tseng Pei-hua (TPE)	2	Hou Yuzhuo (CHN)	3
Hou Yuzhuo (CHN)	6

=== Top half ===
==== Section 1 ====
Round of 64
Pauline Koni (ZAM)	DQ
~~Cheryl-Ann Sankar (TRI)~~
Dilobar Saydullaeva (UZB)	1
Danielle Holmquist (USA)	8
Deborah Louz (NED)	DQ
~~Ekaterina Trubitsina (TJK)~~
~~Betty Marianne Nirina (MAD)~~
Timothea Diola (CYP)	DQ
Al-Yasar Matar (JOR)	6
Meera Chettri (IND)	0

Round of 32
Bineta Diédhiou (SEN)	DQ
~~Pauline Koni (ZAM)~~
Danielle Holmquist (USA)	12
Deborah Louz (NED)	2
Andrea Rica (ESP)	1
Timothea Diola (CYP)	0
Al-Yasar Matar (JOR)	2
Maéva Musso (FRA)	8

Round of 16
Bineta Diédhiou (SEN)	2
Danielle Holmquist (USA)	12
Andrea Rica (ESP)	5
Maéva Musso (FRA)	1

Quarterfinals
Danielle Holmquist (USA)	0
Andrea Rica (ESP)	2

==== Section 2 ====
Round of 64
Zeynep Kiraz (TUR)	3
Nidia Muñoz (CUB)	2
~~Cindy Mora (CRC)~~
Ekaterina Musikhina (RUS)	DQ
~~Estela Tiffer (NCA)~~
Cheong Hye-yoon (NZL)	DQ
Andrea Paoli (LIB)	12
Judith Onoria (UGA)	0
Lee Seung-mi (AZE)	12
Maria José Jara (CHI)	8
~~Cecilia Kanari (KEN)~~
Aminata Traoré (MLI)	DQ

Round of 32
Veronica Calabrese (ITA)	7
Zeynep Kiraz (TUR)	6
Ekaterina Musikhina (RUS)	0
Cheong Hye-yoon (NZL)	1
Andrea Paoli (LIB)	4
Lee Seung-mi (AZE)	6
Aminata Traoré (MLI)	11
Josseline Eyenga (CMR)	0

Round of 16
Veronica Calabrese (ITA)	5
Cheong Hye-yoon (NZL)	4
Lee Seung-mi (AZE)	11
Aminata Traoré (MLI)	2

Quarterfinals
Veronica Calabrese (ITA)	2
Lee Seung-mi (AZE)	1

=== Bottom half ===
==== Section 3 ====
Round of 64
Karla Alava (PHI)	DQ
~~Lisa Weinzierl (AUT)~~
Josipa Lozančić (BIH)	DQ
~~Nauli Dueñas (MEX)~~
Melvis Contreras (VEN)	0
Jennifer Köpf (GER)	7
Doris Patiño (COL)	DQ
~~Keshia Suhail (SRI)~~
Iuliia Podolian (UKR)	7
Sousan Hajipour (IRI)	6
Olivera Marković (SRB)	2
Nguyễn Thị Hoài Thu (VIE)	4

Round of 32
Tseng Pei-hua (TPE)	12
Karla Alava (PHI)	0
Josipa Lozančić (BIH)	3
Jennifer Köpf (GER)	4
Doris Patiño (COL)	4
Iuliia Podolian (UKR)	1
Nguyễn Thị Hoài Thu (VIE)	8
Samira Saadalla (EGY)	3

Round of 16
Tseng Pei-hua (TPE)	8
Jennifer Köpf (GER)	1
Doris Patiño (COL)	6
Nguyễn Thị Hoài Thu (VIE)	4

Quarterfinals
Tseng Pei-hua (TPE)	8
Doris Patiño (COL)	1

==== Section 4 ====
Round of 64
Kahina Keddar (ALG)	1
Jessica Jordan (AUS)	6
Edina Kotsis (HUN)	5
Aurora Román (PUR)	1
Rafaela Araújo (BRA)	1
Shannon Condie (CAN)	9
~~Line Møller Hansen (DEN)~~
Hou Yuzhuo (CHN)	DQ
Lee Mi-ran (KOR)	3
Katarzyna Wieczorek (POL)	0
Zarina Shamshatkyzy (KAZ)	3
Dinanyiris Furcal (DOM)	3

Round of 32
Bat-El Gatterer (ISR)	7
Jessica Jordan (AUS)	3
Edina Kotsis (HUN)	9
Shannon Condie (CAN)	3
Hou Yuzhuo (CHN)	9
Lee Mi-Ran (KOR)	2
Zarina Shamshatkyzy (KAZ)	1
Martina Zubčić (CRO)	4

Round of 16
Bat-El Gatterer (ISR)	3
Edina Kotsis (HUN)	7
Hou Yuzhuo (CHN)	5
Martina Zubčić (CRO)	4

Quarterfinals
Edina Kotsis (HUN)	0
Hou Yuzhuo (CHN)	1
