= Ivory Coast at the 2012 Summer Olympics =

- Flag of Ivory Coast
- IOC code: CIV
- NOC: Comité National Olympique de Côte d'Ivoire

in London
- Competitors: 10 in 6 sports
- Flag bearers: Ben Youssef Meité (opening); Philippe Kouassi (closing)
- Medals: Gold 0 Silver 0 Bronze 0 Total 0

Summer Olympics appearances (overview)
- 1964; 1968; 1972; 1976; 1980; 1984; 1988; 1992; 1996; 2000; 2004; 2008; 2012; 2016; 2020; 2024

Ivory Coast competed at the 2012 Summer Olympics in London, United Kingdom from 27 July to 12 August 2012. This was the nation's thirteenth appearance at the Olympics.

The Ivory Coast National Olympic Committee (French: Comité National Olympique de Côte d'Ivoire) sent a total of 10 athletes to the Games, 4 men and 6 women, to compete in 6 sports. For the third time in its history, Ivory Coast was represented by more female than male athletes at an Olympic event. Sprinter Ben Youssef Meité was the nation's first male flag bearer at the opening ceremony since 2000. Among the sports played by the athletes, Ivory Coast also marked its Olympic debut in archery.

Ivory Coast, however, failed to win a single Olympic medal in London. Sprinter and Olympic hopeful Murielle Ahouré qualified successfully for the final rounds in two of her events, but missed out of the nation's first medal since 1984, after finishing farther from the standings.

== Archery ==
Ivory Coast qualified one archer.

Athlete	Event	Ranking round		Round of 64	Round of 32	Round of 16	Quarterfinals	Semifinals	Final / BM	
Athlete	Event	Score	Seed	Opposition Score	Opposition Score	Opposition Score	Opposition Score	Opposition Score	Opposition Score	Rank
Philippe Kouassi	Men's individual	638	59	Prevost (FRA) (6); L 4–6	Did not advance					

== Athletics ==
Ivorian athletes have so far achieved qualifying standards in the following athletics events (up to a maximum of 3 athletes in each event at the 'A' Standard, and 1 at the 'B' Standard):

Key

- Note – Ranks given for track events are within the athlete's heat only
- Q = Qualified for the next round
- q = Qualified for the next round as a fastest loser or, in field events, by position without achieving the qualifying target
- NR = National record
- N/A = Round not applicable for the event
- Bye = Athlete not required to compete in round

Men

Athlete	Event	Heat		Quarterfinal		Semifinal		Final	
Athlete	Event	Result	Rank	Result	Rank	Result	Rank	Result	Rank
Ben Youssef Meité	100 m	Bye		10.06 NR	2 Q	10.13	5	Did not advance	
Ben Youssef Meité	200 m	DNS		—		Did not advance			

Women

Athlete	Event	Heat		Quarterfinal		Semifinal		Final	
Athlete	Event	Result	Rank	Result	Rank	Result	Rank	Result	Rank
Murielle Ahouré	100 m	Bye		10.99	1 Q	11.01	3 q	11.00	7
Murielle Ahouré	200 m	22.55	1 Q	—		22.49	2 Q	22.57	6
Rosvitha Okou	100 m hurdles	13.62	6	—		Did not advance			

== Judo ==
Athlete	Event	Round of 32	Round of 16	Quarterfinals	Semifinals	Repechage	Final / BM	
Athlete	Event	Opposition Result	Opposition Result	Opposition Result	Opposition Result	Opposition Result	Opposition Result	Rank
Kinapeya Kone	Men's −90 kg	Gerasimenko (SRB); L 0000–1000	Did not advance					

== Swimming ==
Ivory Coast has gained two "Universality places" from the FINA.

Men

Athlete	Event	Heat		Semifinal		Final	
Athlete	Event	Time	Rank	Time	Rank	Time	Rank
Kouassi Brou	50 m freestyle	25.82	44	Did not advance			

Women

Athlete	Event	Heat		Semifinal		Final	
Athlete	Event	Time	Rank	Time	Rank	Time	Rank
Assita Toure	50 m freestyle	33.09	66	Did not advance			

== Taekwondo ==
Ivory Coast qualified 1 athlete.

Athlete	Event	Round of 16	Quarterfinals	Semifinals	Repechage	Bronze medal	Final	
Athlete	Event	Opposition Result	Opposition Result	Opposition Result	Opposition Result	Opposition Result	Opposition Result	Rank
Ruth Gbagbi	Women's −67 kg	Hwang K-S (KOR); L 1–4	Did not advance		Fromm (GER); L 3–4	Did not advance		

== Wrestling ==
Ivory Coast qualified in the following events.

Key

- VT – Victory by Fall.
- PP - Decision by Points - the loser with technical points.
- PO - Decision by Points - the loser without technical points.

Women's freestyle

Athlete	Event	Qualification	Round of 16	Quarterfinal	Semifinal	Repechage 1	Repechage 2	Final / BM	
Athlete	Event	Opposition Result	Opposition Result	Opposition Result	Opposition Result	Opposition Result	Opposition Result	Opposition Result	Rank
Tanoh Rosalie Benie	−48 kg	Bye	Sambou (SEN); L 0–3 ^{PO}	Did not advance					19
