= Ivory Coast at the 1996 Summer Olympics =

- Flag of Ivory Coast
- IOC code: CIV
- NOC: Comité National Olympique de Côte d'Ivoire

in Atlanta
- Competitors: 11 in 4 sports
- Flag bearer: Jean-Olivier Zirignon
- Medals: Gold 0 Silver 0 Bronze 0 Total 0

Summer Olympics appearances (overview)
- 1964; 1968; 1972; 1976; 1980; 1984; 1988; 1992; 1996; 2000; 2004; 2008; 2012; 2016; 2020; 2024; 2028

Ivory Coast competed at the 1996 Summer Olympics in Atlanta, United States.

== Competitors ==
The following is the list of number of competitors in the Games.

Sport	Men	Women	Total
Athletics	5	0	5
Canoeing	2	0	2
Judo	1	1	2
Tennis	2	0	2
Total	10	1	11

== Results by event ==
=== Athletics ===
==== Men ====
Track and road events

Athletes	Events	Heat Round 1		Heat Round 2		Semifinal		Final	
Athletes	Events	Time	Rank	Time	Rank	Time	Rank	Time	Rank
Ahmed Douhou	100 metres	10.53	55	did not advance					
Jean-Olivier Zirignon	100 metres	22.69	106	did not advance					
Franck Waota	200 metres	20.78	29 q	21.14	36	did not advance			
Franck Waota; Ahmed Douhou; Eric Pacome N'Dri; Ibrahim Meité	4 x 100 metres relay	39.43	14 q	N/A		38.99	11	did not advance	

=== Canoeing ===
==== Sprint ====
Men

Athlete	Event	Heats		Repechage		Semifinals		Final	
Athlete	Event	Time	Rank	Time	Rank	Time	Rank	Time	Rank
Koutoua Abia	K-1 500 m	1:55.208	9	1:53.432	8	did not advance			
Miezan Edoukou	K-1 1000 m	4:31.680	8	4:44.155	7	did not advance			

=== Judo ===
Men

Athlete	Event	Result
David Kouassi	Lightweight	13

Women

Athlete	Event	Result
Marguerita Goua Lou	Heavyweight	14

=== Tennis ===
Men

Athlete	Event	Round of 64		Round of 32		Round of 16		Quarterfinals		Semifinals		Final		
Athlete	Event	Opposition	Score	Opposition	Score	Opposition	Score	Opposition	Score	Opposition	Score	Opposition	Score	Rank
Clement N'Goran; Claude N'Goran	Doubles	N/A		(Chinese Taipei) Chen, Lien (TPE)	W 6-2 6-2	(Netherlands) Eltingh, Haarhuis (NED)	L 4-6 4-6	did not advance						
