= Elaine Teo =

Malaysian Taekwondo practitioner

Personal information
- Full name: Elaine Teo Shueh Fhern
- Nationality: Malaysia
- Born: 5 February 1981 (age 45) Malacca, Malaysia
- Height: 1.65 m (5 ft 5 in)
- Weight: 53 kg (117 lb)

Sport
- Sport: Taekwondo
- Event(s): 48 kg, 57 kg
- Club: Traditional Taekwondo Sports Centre
Medal record
Women's taekwondo
Representing Malaysia
Universiade
Bronze medal – third place	2003 Daegu	55 kg
Bronze medal – third place	2005 Izmir	51 kg
Southeast Asian Games
Gold medal – first place	1999 Brunei	55 kg
Gold medal – first place	2001 Kuala Lumpur	55 kg
Gold medal – first place	2007 Bangkok	51 kg
Bronze medal – third place	2009 Vientiane	49 kg

Elaine Teo Shueh Fhern (born 5 February 1981) is a Malaysian Taekwondo exponent. She is a holder of a 4th dan Taekwondo Black Belt from Korea and 5th dan Malaysia. She has represented Malaysia from 1999-2011 in various international tournaments. Her experience as a professional Taekwondo exponent has placed her on the pedestal of honour nationally and internationally. One of her most memorable experience was being the first Taekwondo exponent in Malaysia to qualify twice for the Olympic Games (2004 & 2008).

She made her official debut for the 2004 Summer Olympics in Athens, where she competed in the women's flyweight category (49 kg). She lost the first preliminary match to Guatemala's Euda Carías by a superiority decision from the judges, with a score of 4–4.

At the 2008 Summer Olympics in Beijing, Teo qualified this time for the featherweight category (57 kg), because of an error in her entry form for the Asian Qualifiers. She lost the first preliminary match to Turkey's Azize Tanrıkulu, with a score of 4–7. Because Tanrıkulu advanced further into the final match against Lim Su-Jeong of South Korea, Teo offered another shot for a bronze medal triumph through the repechage bout, where she was eventually defeated by a tall American Taekwondo exponent Diana López, who was able to score only three points at the end of the match.

Teo also made her bid to qualify for the 2012 Summer Olympics in London; however, she was forced into a premature retirement after suffering a torn anterior cruciate ligament in her knee at the Asian Olympic Taekwondo Qualifier in Bangkok, Thailand at year 2011. For her contribution towards the development of Taekwondo internationally, Taekwondo Malaysia (TM/WTF) awarded Teo a "Commendation on Outstanding Contribution to Taekwondo.

Apart from her sports achievements, she is also the only Taekwondo athlete to have won the "2004 National Sportswoman of the year" by the Malaysian Ministry of Youth & Sports.

Furthermore, she was three time SEA Games Gold medalist in 1999, 2001 and 2007. She was the first athlete who won medal at Universiade Games in 2003. After that, once again she won a bronze medalists at 2005 World Universiade Games, Korea. Universiade.

She has a bachelor's degree holder of business administration. at Universiti Putra Malaysia in Selangor.
