= Ivory Coast at the 1992 Summer Olympics =

- Flag of Ivory Coast
- IOC code: CIV
- NOC: Comité National Olympique de Côte d'Ivoire

in Barcelona
- Competitors: 13 (8 men and 5 women) in 3 sports
- Medals: Gold 0 Silver 0 Bronze 0 Total 0

Summer Olympics appearances (overview)
- 1964; 1968; 1972; 1976; 1980; 1984; 1988; 1992; 1996; 2000; 2004; 2008; 2012; 2016; 2020; 2024

Ivory Coast competed at the 1992 Summer Olympics in Barcelona, Spain.

== Competitors ==
The following is the list of number of competitors in the Games.

Sport	Men	Women	Total
Athletics	4	5	9
Canoeing	2	0	2
Judo	2	0	2
Total	8	5	13

== Athletics ==
Men
Track and road events

Athlete	Event	Heats		Quarterfinal		Semifinal		Final	
Athlete	Event	Result	Rank	Result	Rank	Result	Rank	Result	Rank
Jean-Olivier Zirignon	100 metres	10.55	20 Q	10.54	24	Did not advance			
Ouattara Lagazane	200 metres	21.13	28 q	21.39	35	Did not advance			
Franck Waota; Jean-Olivier Zirignon; Gilles Bogui; Ouattara Lagazane	4 × 100 metres relay	40.02	13 q	—N/a		39.46	8 Q	39.31	8

Women
Track and road events

Athlete	Event	Heats		Quarterfinal		Semifinal		Final	
Athlete	Event	Result	Rank	Result	Rank	Result	Rank	Result	Rank
Patricia Foufoué Ziga	100 metres	11.77	35	Did not advance					
Olga Mutanda	200 metres	24.19	36	Did not advance					
Alimata Koné	400 metres	53.76	28 q	53.80	29	Did not advance			
Louise Ayétotché; Alimata Koné; Olga Mutanda; Patricia Foufoué Ziga	4 × 100 metres relay	DQ		—N/a				Did not advance	

Field events

Athlete	Event	Qualification		Final	
Athlete	Event	Distance	Position	Distance	Position
Lucienne N'Da	High jump	1.79	37	Did not advance	

== Canoeing ==
=== Sprint ===
Men

Athlete	Event	Heats		Repechage		Semifinals		Final	
Athlete	Event	Time	Rank	Time	Rank	Time	Rank	Time	Rank
Koutoua Abia; Drissa Traouré	K-2 500 metres	1:46.95	8 R	1:47.72	7	Did not advance			

== Judo ==
Men

Athlete	Event	Round of 64	Round of 32	Round of 16	Quarterfinals	Semifinals	Repechage			Final	
Athlete	Event	Round of 64	Round of 32	Round of 16	Quarterfinals	Semifinals	Round 1	Round 2	Round 3	Final	
Athlete	Event	Opposition Result	Opposition Result	Opposition Result	Opposition Result	Opposition Result	Opposition Result	Opposition Result	Opposition Result	Opposition Result	Rank
Moshe Pennavayre	78 kg	de Souza (ANG); L	Did not advance								
Isaac Angbo	86 kg	Bye	Franco (CUB); L	Did not advance							
