= Canoeing at the 2008 Summer Olympics – Qualification =

== Summary ==
Nation	Slalom				Flatwater												Total	
Nation	K-1 M	C-1 M	C-2 M	K-1 W	Men									Women			Boats	Athletes
Nation	K-1 M	C-1 M	C-2 M	K-1 W	K-1 500	K-1 1000	K-2 500	K-2 1000	K-4 1000	C-1 500	C-1 1000	C-2 500	C-2 1000	K-1 500	K-2 500	K-4 500	Boats	Athletes
Andorra				X													1	1
Angola										X	X						2	1
Argentina					X	X								X			3	2
Austria	X			X											X		3	4
Australia	X	X	X	X	X	X	X		X	X	X			X	X	X	13	16
Belarus							X		X	X	X	X	X	X			7	8
Belgium								X									1	2
Brazil				X						X	X						3	2
Bulgaria												X	X				2	2
Canada	X	X		X	X	X	X	X	X	X	X	X	X	X	X	X	15	21
Chile	X																1	1
China	X	X	X	X	X	X	X	X	X	X		X	X	X	X	X	15	23
Ivory Coast					X	X											2	1
Croatia		X			X	X											3	2
Cuba					X	X				X	X	X	X				6	4
Czech Republic	X	X	X	X											X		5	7
Denmark					X		X	X						X			4	4
Finland							X	X						X	X		4	4
France	X	X	X	X	X		X	X		X	X	X	X		X		12	15
Macedonia	X																1	1
Germany	X	X	X	X	X	X	X	X	X	X	X	X	X	X	X	X	16	22
Great Britain	X	X		X	X	X								X	X		7	7
Greece		X		X						X	X						4	3
Guam										X	X						2	1
Hungary					X	X	X	X	X	X	X	X	X	X	X	X	12	16
Ireland	X																1	1
Israel					X	X											2	1
Italy	X		X	X	X		X	X	X					X	X	X	10	16
Japan	X	X	X	X										X	X	X	7	9
Kazakhstan				X	X	X	X			X	X	X					7	7
Latvia							X	X		X	X						4	3
Lithuania							X					X					2	4
Mexico					X	X					X	X	X				5	3
Myanmar					X	X											2	1
Netherlands	X			X													2	2
New Zealand				X	X	X		X						X			5	5
Norway					X	X											2	1
Poland	X	X	X	X	X		X	X	X	X	X	X	X	X	X	X	15	21
Portugal					X	X								X	X		4	4
Romania										X	X	X	X				4	5
Russia		X	X	X	X	X			X	X	X	X	X	X			11	14
Samoa					X	X											2	1
São Tomé and Príncipe					X	X											2	1
Senegal					X	X								X			3	2
Seychelles					X	X											2	1
Slovakia	X	X	X	X					X	X	X				X		8	12
Slovenia	X					X								X			3	3
South Africa		X	X		X	X				X	X			X	X	X	9	10
South Korea														X			1	1
Spain	X	X		X			X			X	X			X	X	X	9	10
Sweden					X	X		X						X			4	3
Switzerland	X																1	1
Togo	X																1	1
Ukraine										X	X	X	X	X			5	6
United States	X	X	X	X	X	X								X			7	7
Uzbekistan										X	X						2	1
Venezuela							X	X						X			3	3
Total: 57 NOCs	21	16	12	21	29	26	16	14	10	22	22	15	13	25	17	10	289	330

== Slalom ==
An NOC may enter up to 1 boat in each slalom event at the Olympics. Qualification places are awarded to the NOC and not to the athletes.

Qualification timeline:

Event	Date	Venue
Senior World Championships	September 19–23, 2007	(Brazil) Foz do Iguaçu
African Championships	January 27, 2008	(Kenya) Masinga Dam
Oceania Championships	March 15–16, 2008	(Australia) Penrith
American Championships	April 25–27, 2008	(United States) Charlotte
European Championships	May 9–11, 2008	(Poland) Kraków
Asian Championships	May 17–18, 2008	(Thailand) Nakhon Nayok

Places:

Event	K-1 Men	C-1 Men	C-2 Men	K-1 Women
Senior World Championships	France; Germany; Great Britain; Italy; Spain; United States; Slovakia; Austria; Poland; Czech Republic; Switzerland; Slovenia; Ireland; Canada	Slovakia; France; Australia; Germany; Great Britain; Poland; Spain; Czech Republic; Russia	Slovakia; France; Italy; Germany; Czech Republic; China	Germany; Slovakia; Czech Republic; France; Great Britain; Austria; China; Andorra; Spain; Poland; Russia; Australia; Netherlands; United States; Japan
African Championships	Togo	South Africa	South Africa	~~Algeria~~*
Oceania Championships	Australia	~~New Zealand~~**	Australia	New Zealand
American Championships	Chile	United States; Canada**	United States	Canada; Brazil*
European Championships	Netherlands; Macedonia	Croatia; Greece	Poland; Russia	Greece; Italy
Asian Championships	Japan	Japan	Japan	Kazakhstan
Host Qualifiers	China	China	-	-
TOTAL	21	16	12	21

* Algeria received the African spot, but decided not to take place, leaving its place to Kenya, who chose not to participate, either. According to the classification rules, Brazil received the quota place as the next best country in the American qualification tournament.

** New Zealand received the spot, but decided not to take place, Canada received the quota place as the next best country in the American qualification tournament.

== Flatwater ==
An NOC may enter 1 boat in each flatwater competition. Qualification place is awarded to the NOC and not to the athletes. The Host Nation is awarded 1 boat in K-1 Men, K-1 Women and C-1 Men events and if they do not qualify through the world championships, the lowest ranked boat from the world championships will be replaced by the boat from the Host Nation.

=== First allocation ===
Qualification timeline:

Event	Date	Venue
Senior World Championships	August 8–12, 2007	(Germany) Duisburg
African Championships	January 24–27, 2008	(Kenya) Masinga Dam
Oceania Championships	March 12–16, 2008	(Australia) Penrith
Asian Championships	May 9–11, 2008	(Japan) Komatsu
European Championships	May 15–18, 2008	(Italy) Milan
American Championships	May 15–18, 2008	(Canada) Montreal

Minimum boat quota places:

Event	2007 World Championships	Continental qualification					Total
Men	2007 World Championships	Europe	America	Asia	Africa	Oceania	Total
K-1 500m	Canada; Great Britain; Poland; Germany; United States; Hungary; Croatia; South Africa	Denmark; Italy	Argentina	Kazakhstan	Seychelles	Australia	14
K-1 1000m	Great Britain; Canada; Norway; Australia; New Zealand; Hungary; South Africa; Slovenia	Germany; Sweden	United States	China	Senegal	Samoa	14
K-2 500m	Germany; Belarus; Hungary; Lithuania; Latvia; Canada	Spain; France	Venezuela	Kazakhstan	-	-	10
K-2 1000m	France; Poland; Hungary; Germany; Belgium; Finland; New Zealand	Denmark	Canada	China	-	-	10
K-4 1000m	Germany; Poland; Slovakia; Hungary; Belarus; Russia; Australia	Italy	Canada	China	-	-	10
Event	2007 World Championships	Continental qualification					Total
Men Canoe	2007 World Championships	Europe	America	Asia	Africa	Oceania	Total
C-1 500m	Spain; Germany; China; Poland; Canada; Romania	Russia; Ukraine	Cuba	Kazakhstan	South Africa	Australia	12
C-1 1000m	Hungary; Slovakia; Spain; Germany; Russia; Mexico	France; Poland	Canada	Uzbekistan	South Africa	Australia	12
C-2 500m	Hungary; Romania; Germany; Poland; China; Ukraine	Russia; Bulgaria	Canada	Kazakhstan	-	-	10
C-2 1000m	Germany; Cuba; Poland; Romania; Belarus; Hungary	Ukraine	Canada	China	-	-	9
Event	2007 World Championships	Continental qualification					Total
Women	2007 World Championships	Europe	America	Asia	Africa	Oceania	Total
K-1 500m	Hungary; Finland; Germany; Ukraine; United States; South Africa; Poland; Italy	Sweden; Great Britain	Canada	China	Senegal	New Zealand	14
K-2 500m	Germany; Hungary; France; Slovakia; Poland; Italy	Finland; Austria	Canada	China	-	-	10
K-4 500m	Germany; Hungary; Poland; China; Italy; Australia; South Africa	Spain	Canada	Japan	-	-	10

=== Second allocation ===
The IOC caps the total number of athletes in the flat water competition, which determines the minimum boat quota places listed above. However, an athlete may represent his NOC in more than one event, in which case an additional Athlete Quota Place becomes available. The additional entry is awarded to the next best ranked NOC at the corresponding Continental Qualification in which the NOC of the repeating athlete competes.

Second allocation after global qualification :

- K-1 500m Men: 4 Europe ( Russia, Sweden, France, Israel ), 1 America ( Mexico ), 1 Africa ( Ivory Coast )
- K-1 1000m Men: 3 Europe ( Russia, Portugal, Israel ), 1 America ( Cuba )
- K-2 500m Men: 1 Europe ( Italy )
- K-2 1000m Men: -
- K-4 1000m Men: -
- C-1 500m Men: 4 Europe ( Belarus, France, Greece, Latvia ), 1 America ( Brazil ), 1 Africa ( Angola )
- C-1 1000m Men: 1 Europe ( Greece ), 1 Oceania ( Guam )
- C-2 500m Men: 2 Europe ( Lithuania, France ), 1 America ( Mexico ), 1 Asia ( ~~Uzbekistan~~ )
- C-2 1000m Men: -
- K-1 500m Women: 5 Europe ( Slovenia, Denmark, Russia, Portugal, Belarus ), 1 Asia ( South Korea ), 2 America ( Argentina, Venezuela )
- K-2 500m Women: 4 Europe ( Spain, Czech Republic, Great Britain, Portugal )
- K-4 500m Women: -

=== Tripartite Commission Invitation ===
- K-1 500m Men & K-1 1000m Men: Myanmar, São Tomé and Príncipe

=== Additional ===
Athletes filling a quota place in one event may compete in other events as well

- K-1 500m Men: China, Cuba, New Zealand, Norway, Portugal, Samoa, Senegal
- K-1 1000m Men: Argentina, Ivory Coast, Croatia, Kazakhstan, Mexico, Seychelles
- K-2 500m Men: Australia, China, Denmark, Finland, Poland
- K-2 1000m Men: Italy, Latvia, Sweden, Venezuela
- K-4 1000m Men: -
- C-1 500m Men: Guam, Hungary, Slovakia, Uzbekistan
- C-1 1000m Men: Angola, Belarus, Brazil, Cuba, Kazakhstan, Latvia, Romania, Ukraine
- C-2 500m Men: Belarus, Cuba
- C-2 1000m Men: Bulgaria, France, Mexico, Russia
- K-1 500m Women: Australia, Spain, Japan
- K-2 500m Women: Australia, Japan, South Africa
- K-4 500m Women: -
