= Ivory Coast at the 2000 Summer Olympics =

- Flag of Ivory Coast
- IOC code: CIV
- NOC: Comité National Olympique de Côte d'Ivoire

in Sydney
- Competitors: 14 in 5 sports
- Flag bearer: Ibrahim Meité
- Medals: Gold 0 Silver 0 Bronze 0 Total 0

Summer Olympics appearances (overview)
- 1964; 1968; 1972; 1976; 1980; 1984; 1988; 1992; 1996; 2000; 2004; 2008; 2012; 2016; 2020; 2024

Ivory Coast competed at the 2000 Summer Olympics in Sydney, Australia. Nine athletes competed in seven events and won zero medals.

== Competitors ==
The following is the list of number of competitors in the Games.

Sport	Men	Women	Total
Athletics	4	4	8
Judo	0	3	3
Swimming	1	0	1
Taekwondo	1	0	1
Wrestling	1	–	1
Total	7	7	14

== Athletics ==
Key

- Note–Ranks given for track events are within the athlete's heat only
- Q = Qualified for the next round
- q = Qualified for the next round as a fastest loser or, in field events, by position without achieving the qualifying target
- NR = National record
- N/A = Round not applicable for the event
- Bye = Athlete not required to compete in round

Men
Track and road events

Athletes	Events	Heat Round 1		Heat Round 2		Semifinal		Final	
Athletes	Events	Time	Rank	Time	Rank	Time	Rank	Time	Rank
Ibrahim Meité	100 metres	10.24	6 q	10.40	31	did not advance			
Ahmed Douhou	200 metres	20.98	36	did not advance					
Éric Pacôme N'Dri; Ahmed Douhou; Yves Sonan; Ibrahim Meité	4 × 100 metres relay	39.06	11 Q	—		38.82	10	did not advance	

Women
Track and road events

Athletes	Events	Heat Round 1		Heat Round 2		Semifinal		Final	
Athletes	Events	Time	Rank	Time	Rank	Time	Rank	Time	Rank
Louise Ayétotché	100 metres	11.52	37	did not advance					
Louise Ayétotché	200 metres	22.85	8 Q	22.86	9 Q	22.76	9	did not advance	
Amandine Allou Affoué; Makaridja Sanganoko; Marie Gnahoré; Louise Ayétotché	4 × 100 metres relay	44.34	18	—		did not advance			

== Judo ==
Women

Athlete	Event	Round of 32	Round of 16	Quarterfinals	Semifinals	Repechage 1	Repechage 2	Repechage 3	Final / BM	
Athlete	Event	Opposition Result	Opposition Result	Opposition Result	Opposition Result	Opposition Result	Opposition Result	Opposition Result	Opposition Result	Rank
Rose Marie Kouaho	−57 kg	Lomba (BEL); L	did not advance							
Lea Zahoui Blavo	−70 kg	Marzuki (INA); W	Kuzina (RUS); L	did not advance						
Akissi Monney	−78 kg	Bye	Rakels (BEL); L	did not advance		Kienhuis (NED); L	did not advance			

== Swimming ==
Men

Athlete	Event	Heat		Semifinal		Final	
Athlete	Event	Time	Rank	Time	Rank	Time	Rank
Gregory Arkhurst	100 m freestyle	53.55	63	did not advance			

== Taekwondo ==
Athlete	Event	Round of 16	Quarterfinals	Semifinals	Repechage Quarterfinals	Repechage Semifinals	Final / BM	
Athlete	Event	Opposition Result	Opposition Result	Opposition Result	Opposition Result	Opposition Result	Opposition Result	Rank
N'Guessan Sebastien Konan	Men's −80 kg	Bye	Mokhosi (LES); W 4–3	Ebnoutalib (GER); L 3–4	—	Estrada (MEX); L 4–6	did not advance	

== Wrestling ==
Key:

- VT - Victory by Fall.
- PP - Decision by Points - the loser with technical points.
- PO - Decision by Points - the loser without technical points.

Freestyle

Athlete	Event	Elimination Pool				Quarterfinal	Semifinal	Final / BM	
Athlete	Event	Opposition Result	Opposition Result	Opposition Result	Rank	Opposition Result	Opposition Result	Opposition Result	Rank
Vincent Aka-Akesse	−85 kg	Khadem (IRI); L 0–4 ^{PO}	Kapuvári (HUN); L 0–6 ^{PO}	Ghiţă (ROU); L 0–10 ^{ST}	4	did not advance			20
