= Veronica Calabrese =

Italian taekwondo practitioner

Personal information
- Nationality: Italy
- Born: 7 November 1987 (age 38) Mesagne, Brindisi, Italy
- Height: 1.70 m (5 ft 7 in)
- Weight: 57 kg (126 lb)

Sport
- Sport: Taekwondo
- Event: 57 kg
- Club: Centro Sportivo Esercito
- Coached by: Yoon Soon-Cheul
Medal record
Women's taekwondo
Representing Italy
World Championships
Silver medal – second place	2009 Copenhagen	57 kg
European Championships
Bronze medal – third place	2006 Bonn	59 kg
Bronze medal – third place	2010 St. Petersburg	57 kg

Veronica Calabrese (born 7 November 1987 in Mesagne, Brindisi) is an Italian taekwondo practitioner. She won two bronze medals for the 57 and 59 kg classes at the European Taekwondo Championships (2006 in Bonn, and 2010 in St. Petersburg). She also captured a silver medal in the same division at the 2009 World Taekwondo Championships in Copenhagen, Denmark, losing out to China's Hou Yuzhuo. Calabrese is a member of the taekwondo team for Centro Sportivo Esercito, and is coached and trained by Yoon Soon-Cheul. She is engaged to two-time Olympic medalist Mauro Sarmiento.

Calabrese qualified for the women's 57 kg class at the 2008 Summer Olympics in Beijing, after placing second from the World Qualification Tournament in Manchester, England. She defeated Colombia's Doris Patiño and Senegal's Bineta Diedhiou in the first two rounds, before losing out the semi-final match to South Korean taekwondo jin and world champion Lim Su-Jeong, with a score of 1–5. Calabrese automatically qualified for the bronze medal bout, where she narrowly lost the medal to United States' Diana López, with a sudden death score of 2–3.
