= Débora Nunes =

Brazilian taekwondo practitioner

Personal information
- Full name: Débora Fernanda da Silva Nunes
- Nationality: Brazil
- Born: 19 June 1983 (age 43) Porto Alegre, Brazil
- Height: 1.75 m (5 ft 9 in)
- Weight: 57 kg (126 lb)

Sport
- Sport: Taekwondo
- Event: 57 kg

Débora Fernanda da Silva Nunes (born June 19, 1983 in Porto Alegre) is a Brazilian taekwondo practitioner. She competed for the women's featherweight category (57 kg) at the 2008 Summer Olympics in Beijing, after defeating tall American taekwondo jin Diana López for the gold medal at the Pan American Qualification Tournament in Cali, Colombia. She received an automatic free pass from the first round, after Niger's Lailatou Amadou Lele had been disqualified from the competition. She lost the quarterfinal match by a decisive point from Croatia's Martina Zubčić, with a score of 2–3.
