= Ivory Coast at the Olympics =

- Flag of Ivory Coast
- IOC code: CIV
- NOC: Comité National Olympique de Côte d'Ivoire
- Medals Ranked 105th: Gold 1 Silver 1 Bronze 3 Total 5

Summer appearances
- 1964; 1968; 1972; 1976; 1980; 1984; 1988; 1992; 1996; 2000; 2004; 2008; 2012; 2016; 2020; 2024

Ivory Coast (also known as Côte d'Ivoire, its official IOC name) has sent athletes to all Summer Olympic Games held since 1964 except for 1980 which it boycotted in protest of the Soviet invasion of Afghanistan. The country first won a silver medal in the men's 400 metres in 1984. In 2016, the country won its first gold and bronze medals in Taekwondo. No athletes from Côte d'Ivoire have competed in any Winter Olympic Games.

== Medal tables ==
=== Medals by Summer Games ===
Games	Athletes	Gold	Silver	Bronze	Total	Rank
1964 Tokyo	9	0	0	0	0	–
1968 Mexico City	10	0	0	0	0	–
1972 Munich	15	0	0	0	0	–
1976 Montreal	8	0	0	0	0	–
1980 Moscow	boycotted					
1984 Los Angeles	15	0	1	0	1	33
1988 Seoul	28	0	0	0	0	–
1992 Barcelona	13	0	0	0	0	–
1996 Atlanta	11	0	0	0	0	–
2000 Sydney	14	0	0	0	0	–
2004 Athens	5	0	0	0	0	–
2008 Beijing	22	0	0	0	0	–
2012 London	10	0	0	0	0	–
2016 Rio de Janeiro	12	1	0	1	2	51
2020 Tokyo	28	0	0	1	1	86
2024 Paris	12	0	0	1	1	84
2028 Los Angeles	future event					
2032 Brisbane	future event					
Total		1	1	3	5	105

=== Medals by sport ===
Sport	Gold	Silver	Bronze	Total
Taekwondo	1	0	3	4
Athletics	0	1	0	1
Totals (2 entries)	1	1	3	5

== List of medalists ==
Medal	Name	Games	Sport	Event
Silver	Gabriel Tiacoh	1984 Los Angeles	Athletics	Men's 400 metres
Bronze	Ruth Gbagbi	2016 Rio de Janeiro	Taekwondo	Women's 67 kg
Gold	Cheick Sallah Cisse	2016 Rio de Janeiro	Taekwondo	Men's 80 kg
Bronze	Ruth Gbagbi	2020 Tokyo	Taekwondo	Women's 67 kg
Bronze	Cheick Sallah Cisse	2024 Paris	Taekwondo	Men's +80 kg

== See also ==
- List of flag bearers for Ivory Coast at the Olympics
