= Su Li-wen =

Taiwanese taekwondo practitioner

Personal information
- Nationality: Taiwan
- Born: 13 December 1980 (age 45)
- Height: 1.71 m (5 ft 7 1/2 in)
- Weight: 57 kg (126 lb)

Sport
- Sport: Taekwondo
- Event: Lightweight / Featherweight
- Coached by: Lee Chia-Jung
Medal record
Women's taekwondo
Representing Chinese Taipei
World Championships
Silver medal – second place	2005 Madrid	Lightweight
Universiade
Gold medal – first place	2007 Bangkok	Lightweight
Asian Games
Gold medal – first place	2006 Doha	Lightweight

Su Li-wen (Chinese: 蘇麗文; pinyin: Sū Lìwén; born 13 December 1980) is a Taiwanese taekwondo practitioner. She won gold medals for the lightweight (63 kg) category at the 2006 Asian Games in Doha, Qatar, and at the 2007 Summer Universiade in Bangkok, Thailand.

Su represented Chinese Taipei at the 2008 Summer Olympics in Beijing, where she competed and played for the women's 57 kg category. She aggravated a left knee injury in her first round defeat to South Korea's Lim Su-Jeong, who scored only a single point. Because her opponent advanced further into the final for a gold medal match, Su qualified for the repechage bout, where she scored a single point and defeated New Zealand's Robin Cheong. In the bronze medal match, Su continued fighting despite falling to the mat for eleven times in visible pain, having suffered from a sustained foot injury, and being advised by her coach to stop. She tied with Croatia's Martina Zubčić for a score of 4–4 in the first three rounds, but lost a match by a decisive point in the fourth and final round. Su was carried from the mat by her coach, and was immediately taken to the hospital for treatment.

Su finished fifth in the women's taekwondo tournament, yet she was widely regarded as the nation's most outstanding athlete at the Olympics, lauded by fans and politicians for her fighting spirit and display of sportsmanship. President Ma Ying-jeou immediately called her to express his admiration of courage, fortitude, and perseverance she had demonstrated in the match.
