= Ivory Coast at the 1972 Summer Olympics =

- Flag of Ivory Coast
- IOC code: CIV
- NOC: Comité National Olympique de Côte d'Ivoire

in Munich
- Flag bearer: Simbara Maki
- Medals: Gold 0 Silver 0 Bronze 0 Total 0

Summer Olympics appearances (overview)
- 1964; 1968; 1972; 1976; 1980; 1984; 1988; 1992; 1996; 2000; 2004; 2008; 2012; 2016; 2020; 2024

Ivory Coast competed at the 1972 Summer Olympics in Munich, West Germany.

== Results by event ==
=== Athletics ===
Men's 100 metres

- La Eilsten

- First Heat — DNS (→ did not advance)

Men's 4 × 100 m Relay

- Kouakou Komenan, Amadou Meïté, Kouami N'Dri (Note: Kouami N'Dri, also a high jumper, also competed in the 4 × 100 metres relay at the 1968 Summer Olympics.), and Gaoussou Koné
