= Ivory Coast at the 1976 Summer Olympics =

- Flag of Ivory Coast
- IOC code: CIV
- NOC: Comité National Olympique de Côte d'Ivoire

in Montreal Canada
- Competitors: 5
- Medals: Gold 0 Silver 0 Bronze 0 Total 0

Summer Olympics appearances (overview)
- 1964; 1968; 1972; 1976; 1980; 1984; 1988; 1992; 1996; 2000; 2004; 2008; 2012; 2016; 2020; 2024

Ivory Coast competed at the 1976 Summer Olympics in Montreal, Quebec, Canada. Ivory Coast and Senegal were the only two African nations that attended these Games. Félix Houphouët-Boigny did not attend the Montreal Olympics in response of the African boycott of the games.

== Results by event ==
=== Athletics ===
Men's 4 × 100 m Relay

- Kraarsene Konan, Georges Kablan Degnan, Gastom Kouadio, and Amadou Meïté

- Heat — 40.23s
- Semi Finals — 40.64s (→ did not advance)

Men's Long Jump

- Kouakou Brou

- Qualification — 7.20m (→ did not advance)
