= Ivory Coast at the 1984 Summer Olympics =

- Flag of Ivory Coast
- IOC code: CIV
- NOC: Comité National Olympique de Côte d'Ivoire

in Los Angeles
- Competitors: 15
- Flag bearer: Avognan Nogboun
- Medals Ranked 33rd: Gold 0 Silver 1 Bronze 0 Total 1

Summer Olympics appearances (overview)
- 1964; 1968; 1972; 1976; 1980; 1984; 1988; 1992; 1996; 2000; 2004; 2008; 2012; 2016; 2020; 2024

Ivory Coast competed at the 1984 Summer Olympics in Los Angeles, United States. The nation returned to the Olympic Games after participating in the American-led boycott of the 1980 Summer Olympics. Gabriel Tiacoh won Ivory Coast's first ever Olympic medal.

== Medalists ==
Medal	Name	Sport	Event	Date
Silver	Gabriel Tiacoh	Athletics	Men's 400 metres	8 August

== Results by event ==
=== Athletics ===
Men's 400 metres

- Gabriel Tiacoh

- Heat — 45.96
- Quarterfinals — 45.15
- Semifinals — 44.64
- Final — 44.54 (→ Silver Medal)

=== Boxing ===
Men's Bantamweight (54 kg)

- Bararq Bahtobe

- First Round — Bye
- Second Round — Lost to Çemal Öner (Turkey), 1-4

=== Judo ===
Men's lightweight (71kg)

- Jean Claude N'Guessan

== Sources ==
- Perelman, Richard B., ed. (1985). Official Report of the Games of the XXIIIrd Olympiad Los Angeles 1984, Volume 2 Competition Summary and Results (PDF). Los Angeles Olympic Organizing Committee. ISBN 0-9614512-0-3. Archived from the original (PDF) on 2012-08-30.
- "Olympic Medal Winners". International Olympic Committee.
