= Ivory Coast at the 1968 Summer Olympics =

- Flag of Ivory Coast
- IOC code: CIV (CML used at these Games)
- NOC: Comité National Olympique de Côte d'Ivoire

in Mexico City
- Competitors: 10 in 2 sports
- Medals: Gold 0 Silver 0 Bronze 0 Total 0

Summer Olympics appearances (overview)
- 1964; 1968; 1972; 1976; 1980; 1984; 1988; 1992; 1996; 2000; 2004; 2008; 2012; 2016; 2020; 2024; 2028

Ivory Coast competed at the 1968 Summer Olympics in Mexico City, Mexico, under the IOC country code CML due to the Ivory Coast in Spanish being Costa de Marfil. It was their second appearance at the Olympics.

== Results by event ==
=== Athletics ===
Men's 100 metres

- Gaoussou Kone

- Round 1 — 10.3 s (→ 3rd in heat, advanced to round 2)
- Round 2 — 10.2 s (→ 3rd in heat, advanced to semi final)
- Semi final — 10.2 s (→ 5th in heat, did not advance)

Men's 400 metres

- Coulibaly Yoyaga

- Round 1 — 50.0 s (→ 8th in heat, did not advance)

Men's 100 metres hurdles

- Simbara Maki

- Round 1 — 14.3 s (→ 6th in heat, did not advance)

Men's 4x100 metres relay

- Atta Kouaukou
- N'Dri Kouame
- Boy Diby
- Gaoussou Kone

- Round 1 — 39.6 seconds (→ 5th in heat, advanced to semi final)
- Semi final — 39.6 seconds (→ 5th in heat, did not advance)

Men's discus throw

- Segui Kragbe

- Round 1 — 55.24 m (→ did not advance)

=== Canoeing ===
Men's K-1 1000 metres

- Jérôme Dogo Gaye otherwise Jérôme Dodo Gaye

- Heats — 4:31.2 min (→ 7th in heat, advanced to repechage)
- Repechage — 4:31.69 min (→ 4th in heat, did not advance)

Men's K-2 1000 metres

- Paul Gnamia and N'Gama N'Gama

- Heats — 3:50.8 min (→ 5th in heat, advanced to repechage)
- Repechage — 4:07.98 min (→ 3rd in heat, advanced to semi final)
- Semi final — 4:01.31 min (→ 5th in heat, did not advance)
