= Ivory Coast at the 1964 Summer Olympics =

- Flag of Ivory Coast
- IOC code: CIV (IVC used at these Games)
- NOC: Comité National Olympique de Côte d'Ivoire

in Tokyo
- Competitors: 9 in 2 sports
- Medals: Gold 0 Silver 0 Bronze 0 Total 0

Summer Olympics appearances (overview)
- 1964; 1968; 1972; 1976; 1980; 1984; 1988; 1992; 1996; 2000; 2004; 2008; 2012; 2016; 2020; 2024

Ivory Coast competed in the Summer Olympic Games for the first time at the 1964 Summer Olympics in Tokyo, Japan.

== Athletics ==
Men
Track & road events

Athlete	Event	Heat		Quarterfinal		Semifinal		Final	
Athlete	Event	Result	Rank	Result	Rank	Result	Rank	Result	Rank
Gaoussou Koné	100 m	10.5	1 Q	10.4	4 Q	10.4	2 Q	10.4	6
Yoyaga Coulibaly	400 m	48.8	7	did not advance					
Denos Adjima Beche	1500 m	3:53.5	7	did not advance					
Simara Demeble Maki	110 m hurdles	15.3	8	did not advance					
Jean Ekonian Toffey	3000 m steeplechase	9:47.4	9	did not advance					

Field events

Athlete	Event	Qualification		Final	
Athlete	Event	Result	Rank	Result	Rank
Segui Denis Kragbe	Shot put	16.59	20	did not advance	
Segui Denis Kragbe	Discus throw	46.43	23	did not advance	

== Boxing ==
Men

Athlete	Event	1 Round	2 Round	3 Round	Quarterfinals	Semifinals	Final
Athlete	Event	Opposition Result	Opposition Result	Opposition Result	Opposition Result	Opposition Result	Rank
Gabriel Achy Assi	Lightweight	BYE	Campbell Palmer (CAN); L 2–3	did not advance			
Boniface Hie Toh	Welterweight	—N/a	Hans-Erik Pedersen (DEN); L 2–3	did not advance			
Firmin Nguia	Light Heavyweight	—N/a	Frederick Casey (AUS); W 3–2	Frantisek Polacek (TCH); L RSC	did not advance		
