= Li-wun =

Li-wun or Li-wen (Chinese: 麗文) is a feminine given name. Notable people with the name include:

- Cheng Li-wun, Taiwanese politician
- Su Li-wen, Taiwanese taekwondo practitioner
