= Ivory Coast at the 2016 Summer Olympics =

- Flag of Ivory Coast
- IOC code: CIV
- NOC: Comité National Olympique de Côte d'Ivoire

in Rio de Janeiro
- Competitors: 12 in 6 sports
- Flag bearer: Murielle Ahouré
- Medals Ranked 51st: Gold 1 Silver 0 Bronze 1 Total 2

Summer Olympics appearances (overview)
- 1964; 1968; 1972; 1976; 1980; 1984; 1988; 1992; 1996; 2000; 2004; 2008; 2012; 2016; 2020; 2024

Ivory Coast, also known as Côte d'Ivoire and officially as the Republic of Côte d'Ivoire, competed at the 2016 Summer Olympics in Rio de Janeiro, Brazil, from 5 to 21 August 2016. This was the nation's fourteenth appearance at the Summer Olympics.

The Ivory Coast National Olympic Committee (French: Comité National Olympique de Côte d'Ivoire) selected a team of 12 athletes, five men and seven women, to compete in six different sports at these Games, overhauling the roster size set in London 2012 by two athletes. For the fourth time in the nation's Olympic history, Ivory Coast was represented by more female than male athletes.

More than half of the Ivorian roster were rookies at the Games, with archer Philippe Kouassi, taekwondo fighter Ruth Gbagbi, and sprinters Ben Youssef Meïté and Murielle Ahouré, top eight finalist in both 100 and 200 metres, returning for their second appearance from London 2012. As the most experienced member of the team, Ahouré was selected by the committee to carry the Ivorian flag in the opening ceremony.

Ivory Coast left Rio de Janeiro with two Olympic medals, adding them to the silver won by sprinter Gabriel Tiacoh in the men's 400 metres at Los Angeles 1984. These medals were awarded to Gbagbi (women's 67 kg) and fellow taekwondo fighter Cheick Sallah Cissé (men's 80 kg), who emerged himself as the Ivory Coast's first ever Olympic champion.

== Medallists ==
Medal	Name	Sport	Event	Date
Gold	Cheick Sallah Cisse	Taekwondo	Men's 80 kg	19 August
Bronze	Ruth Gbagbi	Taekwondo	Women's 67 kg	19 August

== Archery ==
Two Ivorian archers qualified each for both the men's and women's individual recurve by obtaining one of the three Olympic places available from the 2016 African Archery Championships in Windhoek, Namibia. However, the Ivorian National Committee revoked the entry of Carla Frangilli after the final deadline. According to reallocation procedures, the quota was assigned to Greece, and four-time Olympian Evangelia Psarra was selected.

Athlete	Event	Ranking round		Round of 64	Round of 32	Round of 16	Quarterfinals	Semifinals	Final / BM	
Athlete	Event	Score	Seed	Opposition Score	Opposition Score	Opposition Score	Opposition Score	Opposition Score	Opposition Score	Rank
Philippe Kouassi	Men's individual	634	57	Valladont (FRA); L 4–6	Did not advance					

== Athletics (track and field) ==
Ivorian athletes have so far achieved qualifying standards in the following athletics events (up to a maximum of 3 athletes in each event):

Key

- Note–Ranks given for track events are within the athlete's heat only
- Q = Qualified for the next round
- q = Qualified for the next round as a fastest loser or, in field events, by position without achieving the qualifying target
- NR = National record
- N/A = Round not applicable for the event
- Bye = Athlete not required to compete in round

Track & road events

Athlete	Event	Heat		Quarterfinal		Semifinal		Final	
Athlete	Event	Result	Rank	Result	Rank	Result	Rank	Result	Rank
Hua Wilfried Koffi	Men's 100 m	Bye		10.37	7	Did not advance			
Hua Wilfried Koffi	Men's 200 m	20.48	4	—		Did not advance			
Ben Youssef Meïté	Men's 100 m	Bye		10.03	1 Q	9.97 NR	2 Q	9.96 NR	6
Murielle Ahouré	Women's 100 m	Bye		11.17	2 Q	11.01	4	Did not advance	
Murielle Ahouré	Women's 200 m	22.52	2 Q	—		22.59	4	Did not advance	
Marie-Josée Ta Lou	Women's 100 m	Bye		11.01	2 Q	10.94	3 q	10.86	4
Marie-Josée Ta Lou	Women's 200 m	22.31	1 Q	—		22.28 PB	1 Q	22.21	4

== Fencing ==
Ivory Coast has entered one fencer into the Olympic competition for the first time. Gbahi-Gwladys Sakoa had received a spare Olympic berth freed up by South Africa, as the next highest-ranked fencer, not yet qualified, in the women's épée at the African Zonal Qualifier in Algiers, Algeria.

Athlete	Event	Round of 64	Round of 32	Round of 16	Quarterfinal	Semifinal	Final / BM	
Athlete	Event	Opposition Score	Opposition Score	Opposition Score	Opposition Score	Opposition Score	Opposition Score	Rank
Gbahi-Gwladys Sakoa	Women's épée	Bye	Sun Yw (CHN); L 11–15	Did not advance				

== Judo ==
Ivory Coast has qualified one judoka for the women's lightweight category (57 kg) at the Games. Zouleiha Abzetta Dabonne earned a continental quota spot from the African region as highest-ranked Ivorian judoka outside of direct qualifying position in the IJF World Ranking List of May 30, 2016.

Athlete	Event	Round of 32	Round of 16	Quarterfinals	Semifinals	Repechage	Final / BM	
Athlete	Event	Opposition Result	Opposition Result	Opposition Result	Opposition Result	Opposition Result	Opposition Result	Rank
Zouleiha Abzetta Dabonne	Women's −57 kg	Bye	Matsumoto (JPN); L 000–101	Did not advance				

== Swimming ==
Ivory Coast has received a Universality invitation from FINA to send two swimmers (one male and one female) to the Olympics.

Athlete	Event	Heat		Semifinal		Final	
Athlete	Event	Time	Rank	Time	Rank	Time	Rank
Thibaut Danho	Men's 100 m freestyle	52.78	54	Did not advance			
Talita Te Flan	Women's 800 m freestyle	9:07.21	27	—		Did not advance	

== Taekwondo ==
Ivory Coast entered three athletes into the taekwondo competition at the Olympics. Cheick Sallah Cisse qualified automatically for the men's welterweight category (80 kg) by finishing in the top 6 WTF Olympic rankings. Meanwhile, 2012 Olympian Ruth Gbagbi and debutant Mamina Koné secured the remaining spots on the Ivory Coast team by virtue of their top two finish respectively in the women's welterweight (67 kg) and heavyweight category (+67 kg) at the 2016 African Qualification Tournament in Agadir, Morocco.

Athlete	Event	Round of 16	Quarterfinals	Semifinals	Repechage	Final / BM	
Athlete	Event	Opposition Result	Opposition Result	Opposition Result	Opposition Result	Opposition Result	Rank
Cheick Sallah Cissé	Men's −80 kg	Paziński (POL); W 8–2	Güleç (GER); W 7–1	Oueslati (TUN); W 7–6	Bye	Muhammad (GBR); W 8–6	1st place, gold medalist(s)
Ruth Gbagbi	Women's −67 kg	El-Sawalhy (EGY); W 4–3	Niaré (FRA); L 4–5	Did not advance	Louissaint (HAI); W 7–2	Azizova (AZE); W 7–1	3rd place, bronze medalist(s)
Mamina Koné	Women's +67 kg	Épangue (FRA); L 1–3	Did not advance				
