= Lailatou Amadou Lele =

Nigerien taekwondo practitioner (born 1983)

- Born: 29 May 1983 (age 42)
- Citizenship: Nigerian
- Occupation: Taekwondo practitioner
- Notable work: Represented Niger at 2008 Summer Olympics

Lailatou Amadou Lele (born May 29, 1983) is a Nigerien taekwondo practitioner, who competed for the women's featherweight category (57 kg) at the 2008 Summer Olympics in Beijing. She was disqualified from the competition for unknown reasons, allowing her first opponent Debora Nunes of Brazil to be given an automatic free pass for the subsequent round.
