= Ron Atias =

Israeli taekwondo athlete

Personal information
- Nationality: Israeli
- Born: רון אטיאס; 19 April 1995 (age 31) Be'er Ya'akov, Israel
- Height: 1.70 m (5 ft 7 in)
- Weight: 58 kg (128 lb)

Sport
- Country: Israel
- Sport: Taekwondo
- Event: Flyweight (58 kg)
- Club: Sharabi Martial Arts
- Coached by: Adi Dadidov (head coach) and Yehiam Sharabi (coach)
Medal record
Representing Israel
Men's taekwondo
European Championships
Gold medal – first place	2009 Zagreb	Cadet 49 kg
Silver medal – second place	2011 Paphos	Junior 55 kg
Silver medal – second place	2016 Montreux	Flyweight (58 kg)

Ron Atias (Hebrew: רון אטיאס; born 19 April 1995) is an Israeli Olympic taekwondo athlete who represented Israel at the 2016 Summer Olympics.

== Taekwondo career ==
Atias, who started in the sport at the age of seven, trains in Ramla, Israel, which is his hometown. His club is Sharabi Martial Arts.

In 2008, he won a gold medal in the Youth Croatia Taekwondo Open in Zagreb. In 2009, Atias won a gold medal at the Cadet European Taekwondo Championships, in 2010 a gold medal at the senior Austrian Open in Innsbruck, and in 2011 a silver medal at the Junior European Taekwondo Championships. He was picked by the Olympic Committee of Israel as the best 2011 Israeli Young Athlete.

Atias then won gold medals at the youth 2012 Austrian Open and the 2013 senior Austrian Open. In 2014, as a senior, he won bronze medals in the Spanish Open, Israel Open, Serbia Open, and Croatia Open. In 2015, Atias won bronze medals in the Greece Open and the Israel Open.

In 2016, he won the gold medal in the 2016 European Taekwondo Olympic Qualification Tournament, in Istanbul, Turkey, over silver medalist Jesús Tortosa of Spain, who was world junior champion in 2014 in the under 51 kg division. That year Atias also won a silver medal in the under-58 kilogram event at the 2016 European Taekwondo Championships, which was held in Montreux, Switzerland, losing in the finals to world No. 2 Rui Braganca of Portugal.

=== Olympics ===
Atias represented Israel at the 2016 Summer Olympics on August 17 in taekwondo in the under-58 kilogram category. Atias is the first-ever Israeli male taekwondo athlete to compete in the Olympics. Former female Olympic taekwondo competitors for Israel were Maya Arusi (Athens, 2004) and Bat-El Gaterer (Beijing, 2008).
