= Maya Arusi =

Israel taekwondo practitioner

Personal information
- Native name: מאיה ערוסי
- Full name: Maya Arusi
- Nationality: Israel
- Born: 17 October 1982 (age 44) Petah Tikwah, Israel
- Height: 1.60 m (5 ft 3 in)
- Weight: 49 kg (108 lb)

Sport
- Sport: Taekwondo
- Event: 49 kg
- Club: Amos Lod
- Coached by: Alexei Orehov

Maya Arusi (Hebrew: מאיה ערוסי; born October 17, 1982, in Haifa) is an Israeli taekwondo practitioner, who competed in the women's flyweight category. She claimed two medals (a silver and a bronze) in the 51-kg division at the Trelleborg Open, and became the first Israeli athlete in history to compete in taekwondo in the Olympics at the 2004 Summer Olympics. Arusi trained throughout her career for Amos Lod Taekwondo Club, under head coach and master Alexei Orehov.

Arusi qualified as a lone taekwondo fighter for the Israeli squad in the women's flyweight class (49 kg) at the 2004 Summer Olympics in Athens, by placing second behind Spain's Brigitte Yagüe and granting a berth from the European Olympic Qualifying Tournament in Baku, Azerbaijan. Arusi suffered an immediate 1–5 defeat to Venezuela's Dalia Contreras in her opening match. With her Venezuelan opponent being beaten by Canada's Ivett Gonda in the quarterfinals, Arusi hindered her chances to compete for an Olympic bronze medal in the repechage.

She is one of three Israeli taekwondo Olympians, along with Bat El Gaterer (Beijing, 2008) and Ron Atias (Rio de Janeiro, 2016).
