= Ivory Coast at the 2024 Summer Olympics =

- IOC code: CIV
- NOC: Comité National Olympique de Côte d'Ivoire

in Paris, France 26 July 2024 – 11 August 2024
- Competitors: 12 (4 men and 8 women) in 4 sports
- Flag bearers (opening): Cheick Sallah Cissé & Maboundou Koné
- Flag bearers (closing): Arthur Cissé & Maboundou Koné
- Medals Ranked 84th: Gold 0 Silver 0 Bronze 1 Total 1

Summer Olympics appearances (overview)
- 1964; 1968; 1972; 1976; 1980; 1984; 1988; 1992; 1996; 2000; 2004; 2008; 2012; 2016; 2020; 2024

Ivory Coast, also known as Côte d'Ivoire and officially as the Republic of Côte d'Ivoire, competed at the 2024 Summer Olympics in Paris from 26 July to 11 August 2024. It was the nation's fifteenth appearance at the Summer Olympics except Moscow 1980, where it was among nations joining the American led-boycott.

== Medalists ==
Medal	Name	Sport	Event	Date
Bronze	Cheick Sallah Cissé	Taekwondo	Men's +80 kg	10 August

Medals by sport
Sport	1st place, gold medalist(s)	2nd place, silver medalist(s)	3rd place, bronze medalist(s)	Total
Taekwondo	0	0	1	1
Total	0	0	1	1

Medals by gender
Gender	1st place, gold medalist(s)	2nd place, silver medalist(s)	3rd place, bronze medalist(s)	Total
Female	0	0	0	0
Male	0	0	1	1
Mixed	0	0	0	0
Total	0	0	1	1

Medals by date
Date	1st place, gold medalist(s)	2nd place, silver medalist(s)	3rd place, bronze medalist(s)	Total
10 August	0	0	1	1
Total	0	0	1	1

== Competitors ==
The following is the list of number of competitors in the Games.

Sport	Men	Women	Total
Athletics	2	4	6
Fencing	1	1	2
Judo	0	1	1
Taekwondo	1	2	3
Total	4	8	12

== Athletics ==
Ivorian track and field athletes achieved the entry standards for Paris 2024, either by passing the direct qualifying mark (or time for track and road races) or by world ranking, in the following events (a maximum of 3 athletes each):

Key

- Note–Ranks given for track events are within the athlete's heat only
- Q = Qualified for the next round
- q = Qualified for the next round as a fastest loser or, in field events, by position without achieving the qualifying target
- NR = National record
- N/A = Round not applicable for the event
- Bye = Athlete not required to compete in round

Track & road events

Athlete	Event	Heat		Repechage		Semifinal		Final	
Athlete	Event	Result	Rank	Result	Rank	Result	Rank	Result	Rank
Arthur Cissé	Men's 100 m	10.31	5	—N/a		Did not advance			
Cheickna Traore	Men's 200 m	20.54	6 R	DNS		Did not advance			
Marie-Josée Ta Lou	Women's 100 m	10.81	1 Q	—N/a		11.01	2 Q	13.84	8
Marie-Josée Ta Lou	Women's 200 m	DNS		Did not advance					
Maboundou Koné	Women's 100 m	11.17	4	—N/a		Did not advance			
Maboundou Koné	Women's 200 m	22.87 SB	4 R	22.89	1 Q	22.65 SB	5	Did not advance	
Jessika Gbai	Women's 200 m	22.61	2 Q	—N/a		22.36 PB	3 q	22.70	8
Murielle Ahouré-Demps; Jessika Gbai; Maboundou Koné; Marie-Josée Ta Lou	Women's 4 × 100 m relay	DQ		—N/a				Did not advance	

== Fencing ==
Ivory Coast entered two fencers into the Olympic competition. Maxine Esteban secured qualified in the women's sabre event, as the highest ranked individual fencer in the African zone through the release of the FIE Official rankings; meanwhile Jérémy Keryhuel qualified for the games, following the triumph of winning the men's foil event, at the 2024 African Zonal Qualifying Tournament in Algiers, Algeria. This marked the nation's return to the sport for the first time since 2016.

Athlete	Event	Round of 32	Round of 16	Quarterfinal	Semifinal	Final / BM	
Athlete	Event	Opposition Score	Opposition Score	Opposition Score	Opposition Score	Opposition Score	Rank
Jérémy Keryhuel	Men's foil	Massialas (USA); L 3–15	Did not advance				
Maxine Esteban	Women's foil	Ranvier (FRA); L 7–15	Did not advance				

== Judo ==
Ivory Coast qualified one judoka for the following weight class at the Games. Zouleiha Dabonne (women's lightweight, 57 kg) got qualified via continental quota based on Olympic point rankings.

Athlete	Event	Round of 32	Round of 16	Quarterfinals	Semifinals	Repechage	Final / BM	
Athlete	Event	Opposition Result	Opposition Result	Opposition Result	Opposition Result	Opposition Result	Opposition Result	Rank
Zouleiha Dabonne	Women's −57 kg	Aminova (UZB); L 00–10	Did not advance					

== Taekwondo ==
Ivory Coast qualified three athletes to compete at the games. Rio 2016 gold medalist, Cheick Sallah Cissé and Ruth Gbagbi qualified for Paris 2024 by virtue of finishing within the top five in the Olympic rankings in their respective division, meanwhile Astan Bathily qualified for the games by virtue of the victory results in the semifinal round, at the 2024 African Qualification Tournament in Dakar, Senegal.

Athlete	Event	Round of 16	Quarterfinals	Semifinals	Repechage	Final / BM	
Athlete	Event	Opposition Result	Opposition Result	Opposition Result	Opposition Result	Opposition Result	Rank
Cheick Sallah Cissé	Men's +80 kg	Mehdipournejad (EOR); W 6–1, 13–1	Healy (USA); W 4–2, 1–0	Cunningham (GBR); L 6–11, 7–5, 5–5	Bye	Sansores (MEX); W 5–4, 5–6, 5–3	3rd place, bronze medalist(s)
Ruth Gbagbi	Women's −67 kg	Marton (HUN); L 3–6, 6–0, 2–3	Did not advance		Teachout (USA); L 3–0, 5–8, 3–9	Did not advance	
Astan Bathily	Women's +67 kg	Osipova (UZB); L 0–4, 7–2, 0–0	Did not advance		McGowan (GBR); L 0–1, 0–2	Did not advance	
