= Beijing Science and Technology University Gymnasium =

Indoor arena

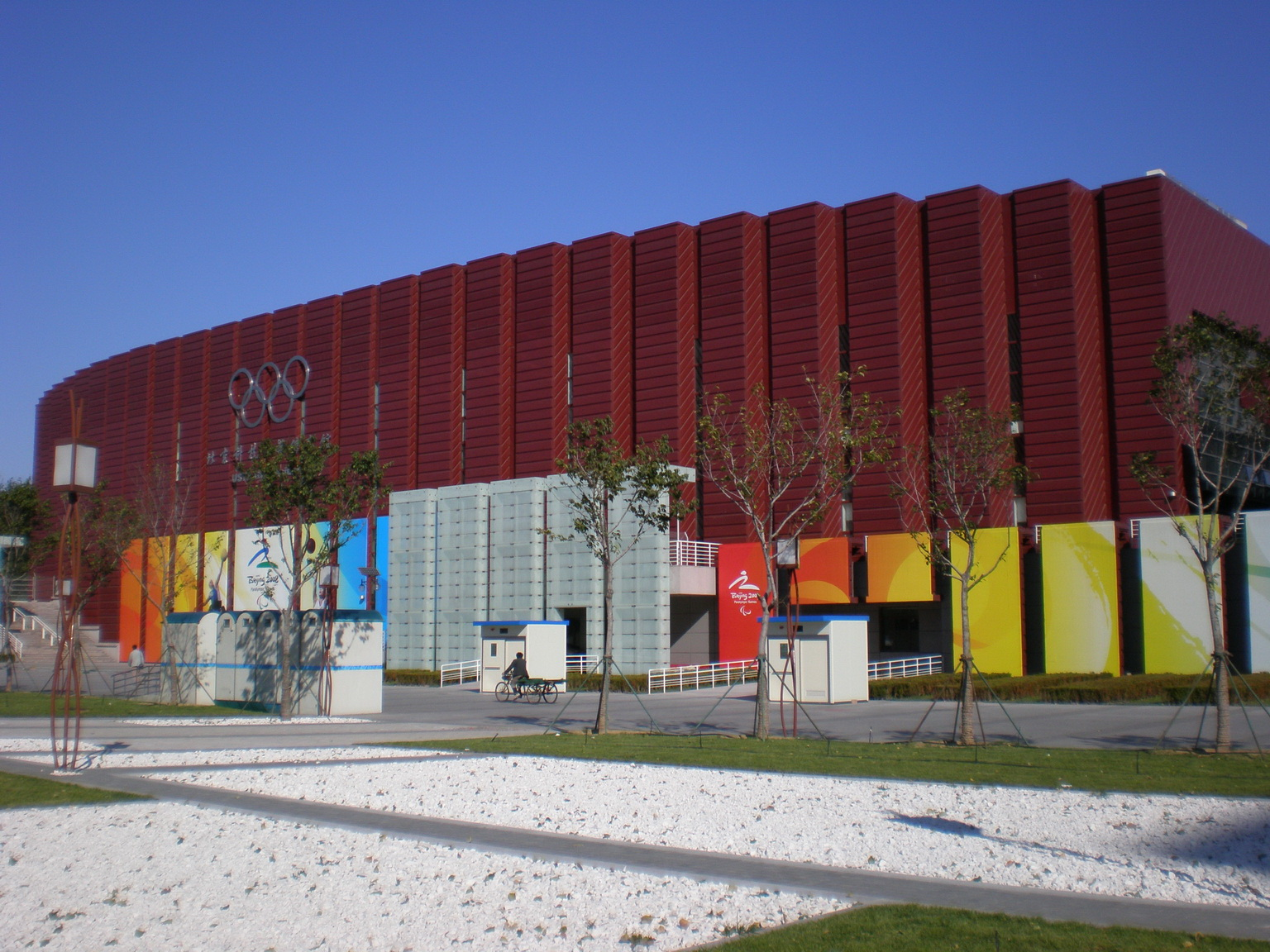
- The indoor arena at the 2008 Summer Paralympics
- Interactive map of Beijing Science and Technology University Gymnasium
- Location: University of Science and Technology Beijing
- Coordinates: 39°59′20″N 116°21′21″E
- Owner: University of Science and Technology Beijing
- Capacity: 8,024

Construction
- Built: 2005–2007
- Opened: 2007

Tenant
- University of Science and Technology Beijing

The Beijing Science and Technology University Gymnasium (simplified Chinese: 北京科技大学体育馆; traditional Chinese: 北京科技大學體育館; pinyin: Běijīng Kējì Dàxué Tǐyùguǎn) is an indoor arena located on the campus of the University of Science and Technology Beijing.

== Construction ==
The venue covers an area of 2.38 hectares and the total floor space of construction reaches 24,662 square metres. The seating capacity is 8,024 seats, including 3,956 temporary ones. It consists of a main gym and a comprehensive facility. Construction started in October 2005 and was completed in August 2007.

== Usage ==
During the 2008 Summer Olympics, it hosted the judo and taekwondo matches. During the 2008 Summer Paralympics, it hosted the preliminary rounds of wheelchair basketball and the wheelchair rugby competition.

After the Olympic Games, the gymnasium turned into a complex to host sport competitions, live performances, and cultural activities. It will also continue to serve the campus.
