= Andrea Rica =

Spanish taekwondo practitioner

Medal record

Representing Spain

Women's taekwondo

World Championships
Bronze medal – third place	2007 Beijing	Bantamweight
Bronze medal – third place	2009 Copenhagen	Featherweight

European Championships
Bronze medal – third place	2006 Bonn	Bantamweight
Bronze medal – third place	2012 Manchester	Featherweight

Andrea Rica Taboada (born December 7, 1984) is a female taekwondo practitioner from Spain.
