= Mariam Bah =

Ivorian taekwondo practitioner (born 1976)

Personal information
- Born: 6 July 1995 (age 31)
- Height: 1.67 m (5 ft 5 1/2 in)
- Weight: 57 kg (126 lb)

Sport
- Country: Ivory Coast
- Sport: Taekwondo
- Event: 57 kg

Mariam Bah (born 6 July 1976) is a two-time Olympic taekwondo competitor and a multiple-time medalist at the African Taekwondo Championships from Côte d'Ivoire. She first competed at the 2004 Summer Olympics in Athens, where she had an honor of carrying the national flag at the opening ceremony. Bah was eliminated in the first round after being defeated by Korea's Jang Ji-Won, with a score of 2–9. Because her opponent advanced into the final round and won the gold medal, Bah qualified for the repechage bout, where she was lost to Spain's Sonia Reyes in the first round. At her second Olympics in Beijing, Bah competed in the women's lightweight category (57 kg). In the first round, she fought against New Zealand's Robin Cheong, who made her debut at the Olympics. Neither of them had scored until Bah was given a defensive kick from her opponent. In the end, Bah was officially eliminated in the preliminary round of the competition.

Olympic Games
Preceded by Ibrahim Meité	Flagbearer for Ivory Coast; Athens 2004	Succeeded by Amandine Allou Affoue
