= Assita Toure =

Ivorian swimmer

Personal information
- Nationality: Ivorian
- Born: 24 November 1992 (age 32); Treichville, Ivory Coast

Sport
- Sport: Swimming

Assita Toure (born 24 November 1992) is an Ivorian swimmer. She was born in Treichville. She competed at the 2012 Summer Olympics in London.
