= Bat-El Gatterer =

Israeli taekwondo athlete

Personal information
- Nationality: Israeli
- Born: בת אל גטרר; February 4, 1988 (age 38) Kokhav Ya'akov, West Bank
- Height: 5 ft 7 in (170 cm)
- Weight: 121 lb (55 kg)

Sport
- Country: Israel
- Sport: Taekwondo
- Event: Featherweight (57 kg)
- Club: Ahi Yehuda, Jerusalem
- Coached by: Avi Kadouri & Noa Shmida
Medal record
Women's Taekwondo
Representing Israel
European Championships
Gold medal – first place	2010 St. Petersburg	Featherweight

Bat-El Gatterer (Hebrew: בת אל גטרר; born February 4, 1988) is an Israeli Olympic taekwondo athlete. She was the women's 2010 European featherweight champion.

== Biography ==
Gatterer was born in and lived in the Israeli settlement of Kokhav Ya'akov, on a hilltop in the West Bank. In 1984, the family moved to Kokhav Ya'akov, a 20-minute drive from Jerusalem, where she trains. She is the eldest of six children, and served in the Israel Defense Forces for two years. She is a religiously observant Jew.

=== Taekwondo career ===
Gatterer enrolled in her first fighting class at 9 years of age, and at 12 years of age she began studying taekwondo. She trains with the club Ahi Yehuda in Jerusalem. She also trains at Wingate Institute, near Netanya, Israel. She is coached by Avi Kadouri and Noa Shmida.

In 2007, she won a gold medal in the under-55 kg class at the Austrian Open in Innsbruck, Austria, and bronze medals at the Trelleborg Open in Trelleborg, Sweden, and the Belgian Open in Herentals, Belgium. She was ranked second in Europe in her weight class by the European Taekwondo Union.

In 2008, competing in the under-55 kg class she won gold medals at the Dutch Open in Eindhoven, The Netherlands, the German Open in Hamburg, Germany, and the Croatia Open in Zagreb, Croatia. She also won a bronze medal at the Austrian Open in Innsbruck, Austria, and a bronze medal in the under-57 kg weight class at the Olympic Games qualification competition in Istanbul, Turkey. Upon qualifying for the 2008 Summer Olympics, she said "I was a little surprised to have qualified. It is a great achievement and it is the dream of every sportsman, but people believed in me."

She competed, at 20 years of age, on behalf of Israel at the 2008 Summer Olympics in Beijing, China. She was defeated 4–3 by former European champion Martina Zubčić of Croatia. She finished tied for 11th place.

In 2009, competing in the under-57 kg class she won a gold medal at the British Open in Manchester, England.

She won the gold medal in the women's featherweight (−57 kg) division at the 2010 European Taekwondo Championships in St. Petersburg, Russia. Also in 2010, competing in the under-57 kg class she won a gold medal at the Dutch Open in Eindhoven, a silver medal in the Paris Open in Paris, France, and a bronze medal at the Belgian Open in Herentals. That year, she was ranked # 3 by the World Taekwondo Federation (WTF).

In 2011, competing in the under-57 kg class she won a gold medal at the Trelleborg Open in Trelleborg, and bronze medals at the German Open in Hamburg and the Croatia Open in Zagreb. In October 2011, she was ranked third in the world in her weight class by the WTF.

In 2012, she won gold medals in the Israel Open and the Croatia Open, a silver medal in the Trelleborg Open, and a bronze medal in the Austrian Open. in 2013, she won a gold medal at the Israel Open, a silver medal at the Dutch Open, and a bronze medal at the Croatia Open. In 2014, she won a gold medal at the Belgian Open, silver medals at the Israel Open and the Trelleborg Open, and bronze medals at the Austrian Open, Argentina Open, Costa Rica Open, and Ukraine Open.

She began 2015, competing in the under-62 kg class, by winning a silver medal at the Greek Open, and a bronze medal at the Ukraine Open.

She is one of three Israeli taekwondo Olympians, along with Maya Arusi (Athens, 2004) and Ron Atias (Rio de Janeiro, 2016).
