= Kouassi Brou =

Ivorian swimmer

Personal information
- Born: June 16, 1992 (age 34) Agnibilékrou, Ivory Coast

Sport
- Sport: Swimming

Kouassi Franck Olivier Brou (born 16 June 1992) is an Ivorian swimmer specializing in freestyle. He competed in the men's 50 m event at the 2012 Summer Olympics.
