= Azize Tanrıkulu =

Turkish taekwondo practitioner

Personal information
- Nationality: Turkish
- Born: 9 February 1986 (age 40) Bismil, Diyarbakir Province, Turkey

Sport
- Country: Turkey
- Sport: Taekwondo
- Events: Flyweight, Bantamweight
- Club: Istanbul BB SK
Medal record
Olympic Games
Silver medal – second place	2008 Beijing	–57 kg
European Championships
Gold medal – first place	2005 Riga	–63 kg
Universiade
Gold medal – first place	2005 Izmir	–63 kg
World Cup
Silver medal – second place	2006 Bangkok	–63 kg

Azize Tanrıkulu (born 9 February 1986) is a Kurdish Turkish taekwondo athlete, who competed in the Women's 57 kg class at the 2008 Summer Olympics held in Beijing, China and won the silver medal. She lost the final match against Lim Su-Jeong by 0–1. She is competing for the İstanbul Büyükşehir Belediyesi S.K. She studied at Akdeniz University.

She graduated from physical education and sports at Akdeniz University. Her brother, Bahri Tanrıkulu is Turkey National Team member in Taekwondo and Olympic silver medalist, and her sister-in-law is Tina Morgan, an Australian former Olympic taekwondo competitor.
