= Ibrahim Meité (sprinter) =

Ivorian sprinter

Personal information
- Born: 18 November 1976 (age 49)

Sport
- Sport: Track and field
Medal record
Representing Ivory Coast
African Championships
Gold medal – first place	1998 Dakar	4×100 m

Ibrahim Meité (born 18 November 1976) is a Côte d'Ivoire sprinter who specializes in the 100 and 200 metres.

== Biography ==
Meité finished seventh in 4 x 100 metres relay at the 1993 World Championships, together with teammates Ouattara Lagazane, Jean-Olivier Zirignon and Frank Waota.

Participating in the 2000 Summer Olympics, he achieved fourth place in his heat, thus failing to make it through to the second round.

His personal best time in the 200 m is 20.64 seconds, achieved in June 1994 in Narbonne. This is the current national record. He also co-holds the national 4 × 100 m relay record of 38.60 seconds with teammates Ahmed Douhou, Yves Sonan and Eric Pacome N'Dri, achieved at the 2001 World Championships in Edmonton.

Olympic Games
Preceded by Jean-Olivier Zirignon	Flagbearer for Ivory Coast; Sydney 2000	Succeeded by Mariam Bah
