= Lim Su-jeong (taekwondo) =

South Korean taekwondo practitioner

Medal record

Women's taekwondo

Representing South Korea

Olympic Games
Gold medal – first place	2008 Beijing	57 kg

World Championships
Gold medal – first place	2009 Copenhagen	Lightweight
Bronze medal – third place	2011 Gyeongju	Featherweight

Asian Games
Gold medal – first place	2002 Busan	Flyweight

Summer Universiade
Gold medal – first place	2007 Bangkok	Featherweight

Lim Su-jeong (Korean: 임수정; Hanja: 林秀貞; Korean pronunciation: [im.su.dʑʌŋ]; born August 20, 1986) is a female South Korean taekwondo practitioner.

== Asian Games ==
At the age of 16, she won the gold medal in flyweight (–51 kg) at the 2002 Asian Games, beating 2004 Olympic bronze medalist Yaowapa Boorapolchai of Thailand in the final.

In 2007, Lim won the gold medal in featherweight (–59 kg) at the 24th Summer Universiade in Bangkok, Thailand, defeating 2005 World Championship bronze medalist Chonnapas Premwaew of Thailand 8–1 in the final.

== Olympic Games ==
She qualified for the 2008 Beijing Olympics, finishing in first place in the –57 kg category at the World Qualification Tournament in Manchester, England. Lim won the gold medal in the women's 57 kg category at the 2008 Olympics, defeating Azize Tanrıkulu of Turkey.
