= Koutoua Abia =

Ivorian canoeist

Koutoua Francis Abia (born August 13, 1965) is an Ivorian sprint canoer who has competed since the early 1990s. At the 1992 Summer Olympics in Barcelona, he was eliminated in the repechages of the K-2 500 m event. Four years later in Atlanta, Abia was eliminated in the repechages of the K-1 500 m event. At his third and most recent Summer Olympics in Beijing, he was eliminated in the first round in both the K-1 500 m and the K-1 1000 m events.
