= Robin Cheong =

New Zealand taekwondo practitioner

Personal information
- Born: 16 December 1988 (age 36); Republic of Korea
- Height: 1.63 m (5 ft 4 in)

Sport
- Country: New Zealand
- Sport: Taekwondo
- Event: 57 kg
- Updated on 22 July 2012

Robin Haeyoun Cheong (born 16 December 1988 in Republic of Korea) is a New Zealand taekwondo athlete, who competed in the Women's 57 kg class at the 2008 Summer Olympics held in Beijing, China reaching quarter finals and eventually ranked 7th. She won gold medal that same year in the Beijing Olympic Selection competition.

Cheong is a 2010 SPARC Taekwondo High Performance Project recipient, allowing her to compete internationally as a preparation for the forthcoming 2012 London Olympic Games.

In 2008, she received the most prestigious University award – the New Zealand University Blue.

Cheong is a resident of Pinehill, Auckland. She is a member of Sejong Taekwondo club and is coached by Grandmaster Jin Keun Oh.

She qualified for the 2012 Summer Olympics, but was knocked out in the first round by Hedaya Malak.

== Achievements ==
Other Robin's competition results include:

- 2006 Oceania Taekwondo Championships – gold medal
- 2007 Oceania Olympic Qualification Championships – gold medal
- 2010 Canada Open Championships, Montreal, Canada – silver medal (World Taekwondo Federation division)
- 2010 Canada Open Championships, Montreal, Canada – gold medal (Olympic division)
- 2010 International Club Open, Yeongcheon, Republic of Korea – gold medal (Olympic division)
- 2010 4th Oceania Taekwondo Union Championships, Nouméa, New Caledonia – silver medal
- 2011 Olympic Games Qualification Tournament, Nouméa, New Caledonia – Gold Medal
