= Diana López (taekwondo) =

American taekwondo practitioner

Diana Lopez
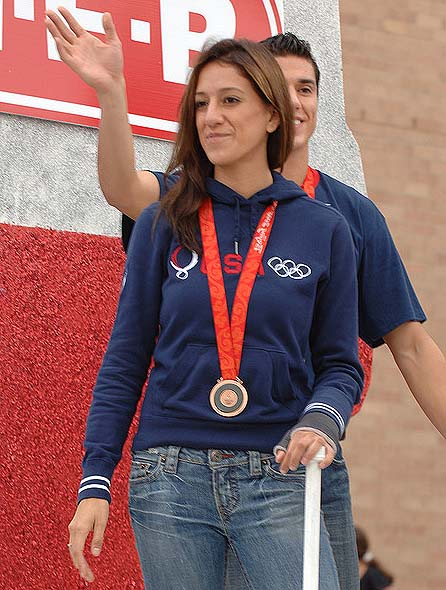
- Lopez in 2008
- Born: January 7, 1984 (age 42); Houston, Texas, U.S.
- Height: 5 ft 10 in (178 cm)

Diana Lopez (born January 7, 1984) is an American Olympic Taekwondo competitor from Sugar Land, Texas. She represented the United States at the 2008 Olympics in Beijing, where she won a bronze medal.

Lopez has three older brothers, Steven and Mark who are also Olympians and Jean Lopez who coached Lopez and her other two brothers. Her family is originally from Nicaragua.

In 2005, Diana and her brothers made history by becoming the first three siblings, in any sport, to win World titles at the same event, when they did so at the 2005 World Taekwondo Championships in Madrid, Spain and in 2008, Diana and her brothers made history again by becoming only the second set of three or more siblings to all qualify for the Olympics.

She graduated from Kempner High School in 2002, and is a student at the University of Houston–Downtown. On August 10, 2013, Lopez married strength and conditioning coach of the NBA's Houston Rockets Joe Rogowski.

== Competition record ==
- 2012 Olympic Trials (57 kg): 1ST
- 2008 Olympic Games (57 kg): BRONZE
- 2008 U.S. Olympic Trials (Feather): 1st
- 2007 Pan Am Olympic Qualifier: SILVER
- 2007 World Olympic Qualifier: Quarterfinals
- 2007 Olympic Trials (Bantam/Feather): 1st
- 2007 World Championships (Feather): BRONZE
- 2007 Sr. National Team Trials (Feather): 1st
- 2006 Pan Am Qualifier (Olympic Feather): GOLD
- 2006 Dutch Open (Feather): BRONZE
- 2006 Sr. National Team Trials (Feather): 1st
- 2005 U.S. Olympic Committee Female Athlete of the Month (April)
- 2005 World Taekwondo Championships GOLD
- 2005 German Open GOLD
- 2005 National Team Trials GOLD
- 2004 Olympic Alternate
- 2004 Dutch Open GOLD
- 2004 Senior Nationals BRONZE
- 2003 National Team Trials GOLD
- 2002 Brussels Indoor Open GOLD
- 2002 Dutch Open GOLD
- 2002 Pan American Championships GOLD
- 2002 World Cup BRONZE
- 2002 National Team Trials GOLD
- 2001 Junior Nationals GOLD
- 2001 US Open SILVER
- 2001 Mexico Open GOLD
- 2001 National Team Trials GOLD
- 2000 Junior Nationals GOLD
- 2000 Junior World Championships GOLD
- 2000 Olympic Team Trials BRONZE
- 2000 Fight Off for World Cup Team GOLD
- 2000 Korean Open BRONZE
- 2000 US Open Sr. Division BRONZE
- 1999 Junior Nationals GOLD
- 1998 Junior Nationals GOLD
- 1998 Junior World Championships GOLD
- 1998 US Open Jr. Division SILVER
- 1997 Junior Nationals GOLD
- 1996 Junior Nationals GOLD
- 1995 Junior Nationals GOLD
- 1994 Junior Nationals GOLD
- 1993 Junior Nationals GOLD
- 1992 Junior Nationals GOLD
- 1991 Junior Nationals GOLD
