= Martina Zubčić =

Croatian taekwondo athlete

Personal information
- Born: 3 June 1989 (age 37) Zagreb, Croatia
Medal record
Representing Croatia
Women's taekwondo
Olympic Games
Bronze medal – third place	2008 Beijing	57 kg
European Championships
Gold medal – first place	2005 Riga	Bantamweight
Bronze medal – third place	2006 Bonn	Featherweight
Silver medal – second place	2008 Rome	Featherweight
Bronze medal – third place	2016 Montreaux	Featherweight
Universiade
Bronze medal – third place	2009 Belgrade	Featherweight

Martina Zubčić (born 3 June 1989 in Zagreb) is a Croatian taekwondo athlete, who competed in the Women's 57 kg class at the 2008 Summer Olympics held in Beijing, China. She won the bronze medal.
