= Comité National Olympique de Côte d'Ivoire =

National Olympic Committee

National Olympic Committee of Ivory Coast
- Country: Ivory Coast
- [[|]]
- Code: CIV
- Recognized: 1963
- Continental Association: ANOCA
- Headquarters: Abidjan, Ivory Coast
- President: Lassana Palenfo
- Secretary General: Minatah Fofana
- Website: cno-civ.ci

The National Olympic Committee of Ivory Coast (French: Comité National Olympique de Côte d'Ivoire) (IOC code: CIV) is the National Olympic Committee representing Ivory Coast.

== See also ==
- Ivory Coast at the Olympics
