= Flag of Ivory Coast =

Republic of Côte d'Ivoire
- Use: National flag and ensign
- Proportion: 2:3
- Adopted: 3 December 1959; 66 years ago
- Design: A vertical tricolour of orange, white, and green

The national flag of Ivory Coast (or Côte d'Ivoire) is a vertical tricolour of orange, white, and green, with a 2:3 width-to-length ratio. It was adopted on 3 December 1959 with the passing of law no. 59-240 by the Ivorian Legislative Assembly, and is defined in Article 48 of the country's 2016 constitution. It is similar to the flag of Ireland, but with the tricolour reversed and with less oblong proportions.

The symbolism of the flag's colours and layout has been variously interpreted as representing aspects of the country's growth and geography. The president's office uses the meaning assigned by then state minister Jean Delafosse in a speech he gave after the flag was adopted. Delafosse stated that orange represents Ivorians' land, struggle, and blood; white represents peace and order; and green represents hope and a better future.

== Adoption ==
The results of the 1958 French constitutional referendum led to the French Fourth Republic being replaced with the Fifth Republic and the French Union with the French Community, under which most colonies became "autonomous states", including Ivory Coast on 4 December 1958. The new status allowed the adoption of a distinct flag for the first time, in place of the French flag. The orange, white, and green tricolour was adopted by law no. 59-240, passed by the Ivorian Legislative Assembly on 3 December 1959, just before the first anniversary of the country's autonomy. The French commissioner had suggested a red, white, and blue tricolour with stars, but Ivorians wanted a greater departure from the flag of their former colonial ruler. Conversely, the vexillologist Whitney Smith claimed that, in contrast to neighbouring post-colonial states, Ivory Coast rejected the pan-African colours of green, yellow, and red for its national flag because of its close ties to France.

Augustin Loubao's proposal (1960)

Prime Minister Félix Houphouët-Boigny declared full independence from France on 7 August 1960, and the Legislative Assembly sat as a constituent assembly to draft a constitution. Legislator Augustin Loubao proposed changing the orange band to red, to symbolise Ivorians' willingness to shed their blood to defend the new republic. Other legislators opposed the proposed change, and the existing flag was retained in Article 1 of the constitution adopted on 3 November 1960. It was retained as Article 29 of the 2000 constitution and Article 48 of the 2016 constitution.

== Design ==
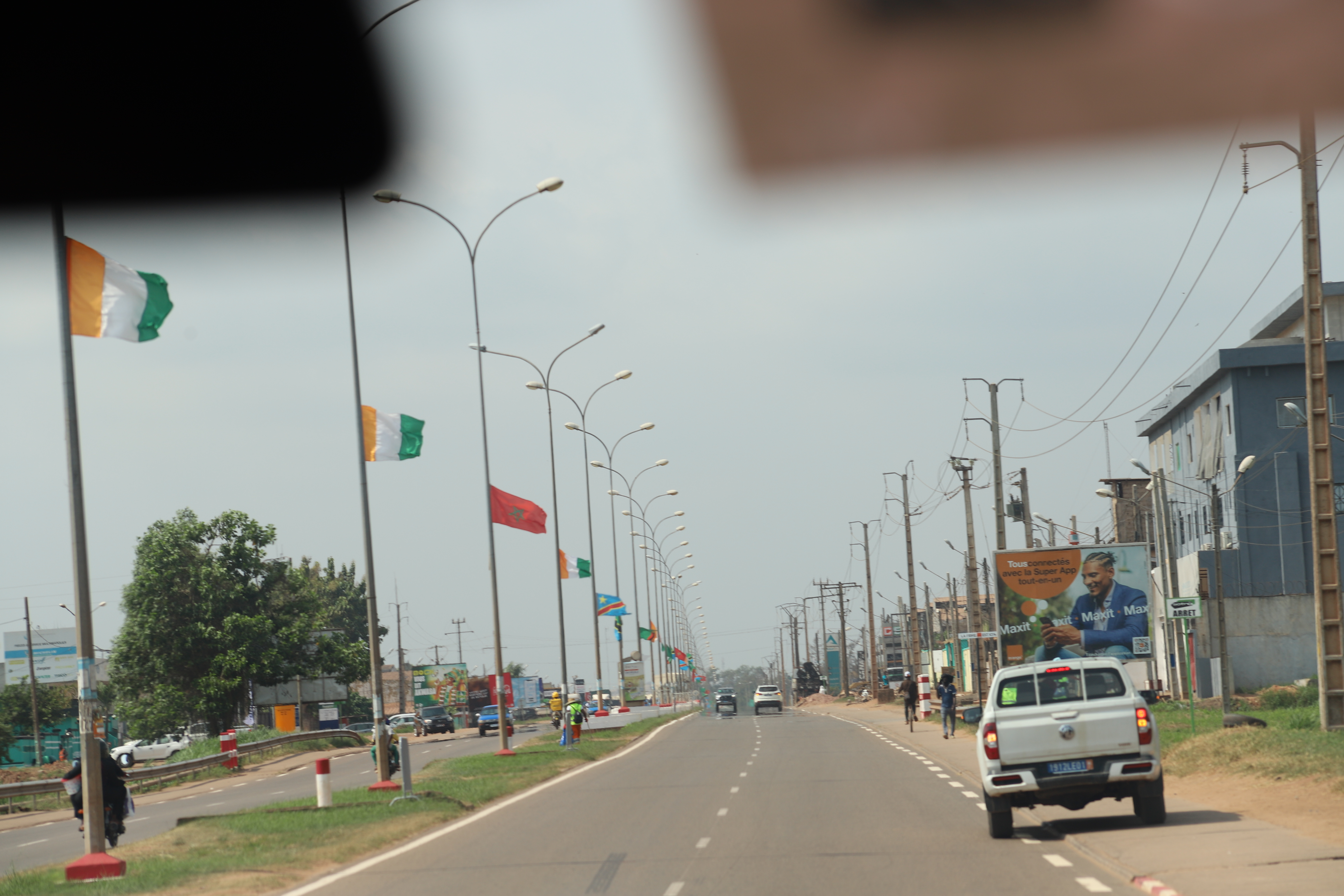
The Ivorian flag flying alongside those of other countries in San-Pédro

The design of the flag is defined in Article 48 of the Constitution of Ivory Coast (2016) as a "tricolour flag of orange, white, and green in vertical bands and of equal dimensions". (Note: Translated from French: "... le drapeau tricolore orange, blanc, vert, en bandes verticales et d'égales dimensions.") The width-to-length ratio of the flag is 2:3. The London Organising Committee of the Olympic and Paralympic Games (LOCOG) used Pantone codes PMS 151 for orange and PMS 347 for green in their manual for the 2012 Summer Olympics. The Millennium Challenge Corporation (MCC), a U.S. foreign aid agency, meanwhile uses hexadecimal colours #F39200 for orange and #009649 for green in its graphic guide.

Colours of the Ivorian flag according to LOCOG
	Orange	White	Green
CMYK	0/70/100/0	0/0/0/0	77/20/95/4
Hexadecimal	#FF8200	#FFFFFF	#009A44
Pantone	151	N/A	347
RGB	255/130/0	255/255/255	0/154/68

=== Symbolism ===
After the flag was officially adopted on 3 December 1959, Minister of State Jean Delafosse presented the flag to the Legislative Assembly and gave the following explanation of its significance:

L'Emblème National doit être le vivant Symbole de la Patrie. L'Orange rappelant la couleur de notre terre riche et généreuse, c'est le sens de notre lutte, le sang d'un peuple jeune dans sa lutte pour notre émancipation; le Blanc, la paix, mais la paix du droit; le Vert, l'espérance, certes pour d'autres, mais pour nous, la certitude d'un devenir meilleur.
The national [flag] must be the living symbol of the fatherland: orange recalling the colour of our rich and generous land, it is the meaning of our struggle, the blood of a young people in its struggle for our emancipation; white, peace, but the peace of law; green, hope, certainly for others, but for us, the certainty of a better future.

The office of the president of Ivory Coast repeats this anecdote and describes it as having "thus defined the meaning of [the flag]". Smith similarly wrote in the Encyclopædia Britannica that the "symbolism of the colours was said to be dynamic national growth (orange), peace developing out of the purity and unity of all citizens (white), and hope for the future (green)". However, when presenting the colours of the flag to the 1960 constitutional assembly, commissioner Mamadou Coulibaly gave a different explanation:

La bande Orange exprime l'éclat de l'épanouissement national, en même temps qu'elle fait penser aux Savanes du Nord. La bande Blanche magnifie la paix dans la pureté et l'union des cœurs et est le gage de notre succès et la bande Verte, expression de notre espérance dans l'avenir rappelle la luxuriante forêt vierge de Côte d'Ivoire, première grande source de la prospérité nationale.
The orange band expresses the brilliance of national blossoming, while also serving as a reminder of the northern savannas. The white band glorifies peace in the purity and union of hearts, and is the pledge of our success; and the green band, expression of our hope for the future, recalls the luxuriant virgin forest of Ivory Coast, the first great source of national prosperity.

Smith describes the added meaning of the savannas and forests as unofficial. The vertical alignment of the bands also symbolises Ivorian youth working towards a better future for their country, under the national motto "Unity, Discipline and Work" (L'Union, la Discipline et le Travail).

== Similarity to the flag of Ireland ==
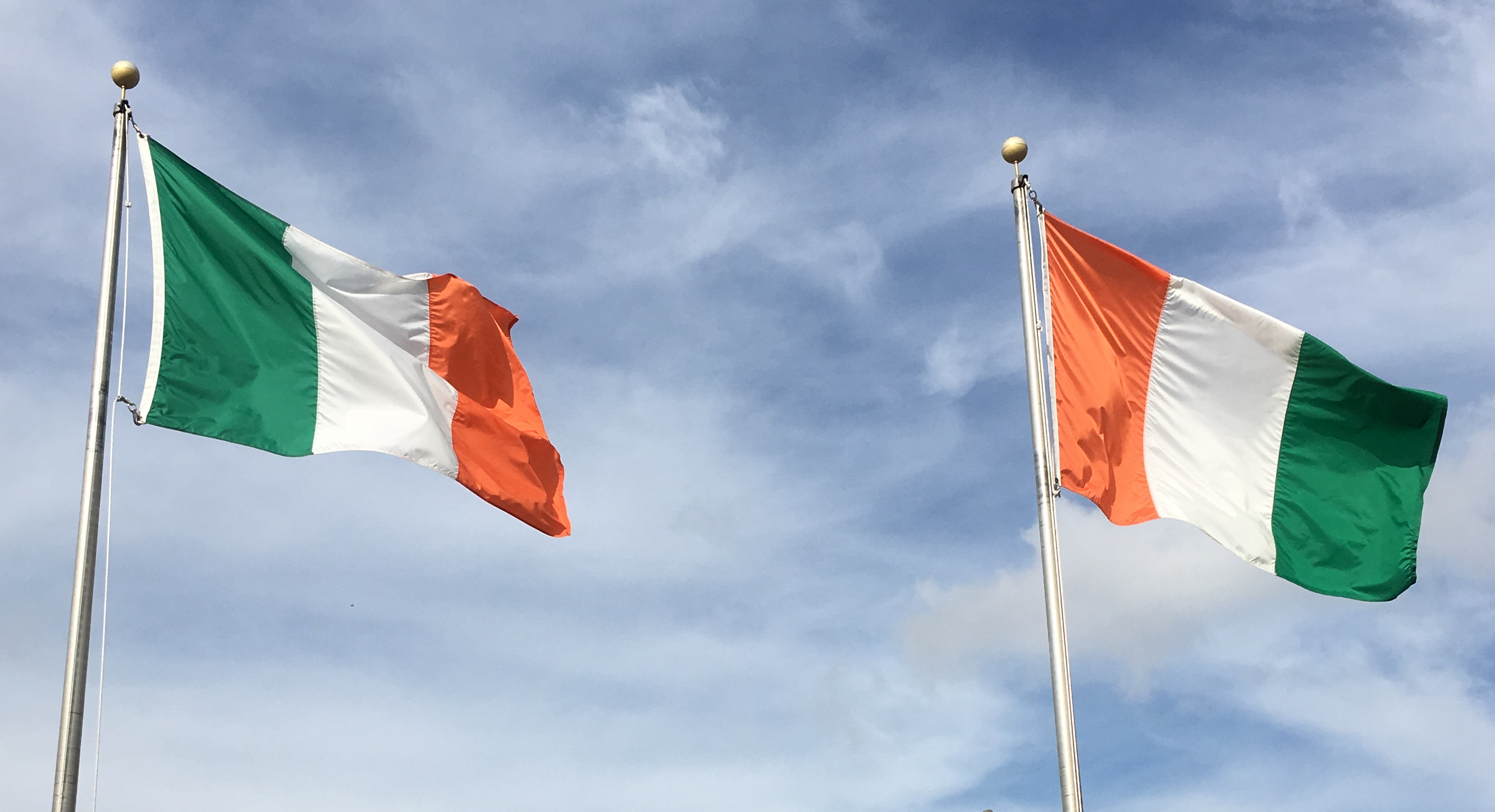
Contrasting flags: the flag of Ireland on the left and the flag of Ivory Coast on the right. (Note: The proportions of the Ivorian flag shown in this photograph are incorrect.)

The flag of Ivory Coast is similar to the flag of Ireland, which is the exact same tricolour but reversed (the green being on the hoist side) and with a width-to-length ratio of 1:2 rather than 2:3. Due to the similarity of the two flags, Ulster loyalists in Northern Ireland have sometimes desecrated the Ivorian flag, mistaking it for the Irish flag. For example, during Ulster celebrations of the Twelfth in 2013, large Ivorian flags were burned in a bonfire in Belfast instead of Irish ones. In 2014, a Belfast shop hanging the Ivorian flag as part of a FIFA World Cup display labelled it accordingly to avoid confusion with the Irish flag. Conversely, when Ivorian sprinter Murielle Ahouré-Demps celebrated winning gold at the 2018 World Indoor 60-meter dash, for lack of an Ivorian flag to wave, she borrowed an Irish flag from a spectator and reversed it.

== See also ==
- Coat of arms of Ivory Coast
