= 2013 World Youth Championships in Athletics – Girls' heptathlon =

Girls' heptathlon at the 2013 World Youth Championships in Athletics
- Venue: RSC Olimpiyskiy
- Dates: 12–13 July
- Competitors: 39
- Winning points: 5747 CR

Medalists
gold medal	Celina Leffler	Germany
silver medal	Emma Stenlöf	Sweden
bronze medal	Louisa Grauvogel	Germany

The girls' heptathlon at the 2013 World Youth Championships in Athletics was held on 12 and 13 July.

== Medalists ==
Gold	Silver	Bronze
Celina Leffler; Germany	Emma Stenlöf; Sweden	Louisa Grauvogel; Germany

== Results ==
=== 100 metres hurdles ===
Rank	Heat	Name	Nationality	Time	Points	Notes
1	5	Inge Drost	Netherlands	13.49	1052	
2	5	Emma Stenlöf	Sweden	13.90	993	
3	5	Meg Hemphill	Japan	13.91	991	PB
4	5	Aliyah Johnson	Australia	13.93	988	
5	5	Celina Leffler	Germany	14.01	977	
6	3	Alexa Harmon-Thomas	United States	14.08	967	PB
7	5	Andrea Medina	Spain	14.10	964	
8	4	Morgan Lake	Great Britain	14.12	961	PB
8	4	Fiorella Chiappe	Argentina	14.12	961	PB
10	1	Esther Turpin	France	14.16	956	SB
11	3	Kristella Jurkatamm	Estonia	14.28	939	PB
12	5	Louisa Grauvogel	Germany	14.32	934	
13	4	Yelizaveta Kolokolchikova	Russia	14.34	931	PB
14	4	Fiona Espagnet	France	14.36	928	
15	1	Jersy Díaz	Cuba	14.39	924	PB
16	3	Maria Pavlova	Russia	14.45	916	PB
17	4	Johanna Dyremark	Sweden	14.49	910	
18	4	Emília Del Hoyo	Spain	14.50	909	
19	3	Giulia Sportoletti	Italy	14.52	906	PB
20	3	Noor Vidts	Belgium	14.57	899	PB
21	5	Maria Huntington	Finland	14.59	897	
22	2	Anna Nečinová	Czech Republic	14.60	895	PB
23	4	Sanja Ristović	Serbia	14.63	891	
24	4	Lucia Quaglieri	Italy	14.69	883	
25	3	Alexandra Morrow	Canada	14.81	867	
26	3	Barbora Zatloukalová	Czech Republic	14.83	864	
27	3	Noémi Szücs	Hungary	14.85	862	
28	2	Weronika Grzelak	Poland	14.86	860	PB
28	2	Margot Meri	Estonia	14.86	860	PB
28	2	Naomi Urbano	Mexico	14.86	860	PB
31	2	Alysha Burnett	Australia	14.88	858	PB
32	2	Isabela Oliveira	Brazil	14.90	855	
33	2	Veranika Tsialpuk	Belarus	15.18	818	PB
34	2	Hrystina Volkova	Ukraine	15.19	817	
35	1	Robyn Buckingham	Canada	15.81	738	PB
36	1	Irina Velihanova	Turkmenistan	15.83	735	PB
37	1	Staša Trajkovič	Slovenia	15.93	723	
38	1	Ásgerður Jana Ágústsdóttir	Iceland	15.98	717	PB
39	1	Kamilė Žiliūtė	Lithuania	16.02	712	PB

=== High jump ===
Rank	Group	Name	Nationality	1.42	1.45	1.48	1.51	1.54	1.57	1.60	1.63	1.66	Mark	Points	Notes
Rank	Group	Name	Nationality	1.69	1.72	1.75	1.78	1.81	1.84	1.87	1.90	1.93	Mark	Points	Notes
1	B	Morgan Lake	Great Britain	–	–	–	–	–	–	–	–	–	1.90	1106	WYL
1	B	Morgan Lake	Great Britain	o	o	o	o	xo	xxo	xxo	o	xxx	1.90	1106	WYL
2	A	Emma Stenlöf	Sweden	–	–	–	–	–	–	–	–	xo	1.78	953	PB
2	A	Emma Stenlöf	Sweden	o	xxo	o	xo	xxx					1.78	953	PB
3	B	Alexa Harmon-Thomas	United States	–	–	–	–	–	–	–	–	o	1.75	916	
3	B	Alexa Harmon-Thomas	United States	–	o	o	xxx						1.75	916	
3	A	Alysha Burnett	Australia	–	–	–	–	–	–	–	–	o	1.75	916	
3	A	Alysha Burnett	Australia	o	o	o	xxx						1.75	916	
5	A	Johanna Dyremark	Sweden	–	–	–	–	o	o	o	o	o	1.72	879	PB
5	A	Johanna Dyremark	Sweden	xo	xo	xxx							1.72	879	PB
5	A	Noor Vidts	Belgium	–	–	–	–	–	–	–	–	o	1.72	879	SB
5	A	Noor Vidts	Belgium	xo	xo	xxx							1.72	879	SB
7	B	Andrea Medina	Spain	–	–	–	–	o	o	o	o	xo	1.72	879	PB
7	B	Andrea Medina	Spain	xo	xxo	xxx							1.72	879	PB
7	B	Maria Pavlova	Russia	–	–	–	–	–	–	o	o	o	1.72	879	PB
7	B	Maria Pavlova	Russia	xxo	xxo	xxx							1.72	879	PB
9	B	Weronika Grzelak	Poland	–	–	–	–	o	–	xxo	xo	xo	1.72	879	PB
9	B	Weronika Grzelak	Poland	o	xxo	xxx							1.72	879	PB
10	A	Fiorella Chiappe	Argentina	–	–	–	–	o	o	o	o	o	1.69	842	PB
10	A	Fiorella Chiappe	Argentina	o	xxx								1.69	842	PB
11	A	Aliyah Johnson	Australia	–	–	–	–	–	o	o	o	o	1.69	842	
11	A	Aliyah Johnson	Australia	xo	xxx								1.69	842	
12	A	Esther Turpin	France	–	–	o	xo	o	o	o	xo	xxo	1.69	842	PB
12	A	Esther Turpin	France	xxo	xxx								1.69	842	PB
13	B	Yelizaveta Kolokolchikova	Russia	–	–	–	–	–	–	–	o	xo	1.66	806	
13	B	Yelizaveta Kolokolchikova	Russia	xxx									1.66	806	
14	A	Veranika Tsialpuk	Belarus	–	–	–	–	–	o	o	o	xxx	1.63	771	
15	B	Celina Leffler	Germany	–	–	o	o	o	o	xo	o	xxx	1.63	771	PB
15	B	Naomi Urbano	Mexico	–	–	o	o	o	o	xo	o	xxx	1.63	771	SB
17	A	Giulia Sportoletti	Italy	–	–	–	–	o	o	o	xo	xxx	1.63	771	
18	B	Kristella Jurkatamm	Estonia	–	–	–	o	o	o	xo	xo	xxx	1.63	771	
18	A	Maria Huntington	Finland	–	–	–	–	o	o	xo	xo	xxx	1.63	771	
20	A	Fiona Espagnet	France	–	–	–	o	xxo	o	xxo	xo	xxx	1.63	771	
20	A	Robyn Buckingham	Canada	–	–	–	–	xxo	xo	xo	xo	xxx	1.63	771	PB
22	B	Louisa Grauvogel	Germany	–	–	o	o	o	o	o	xxo	xxx	1.63	771	
23	A	Inge Drost	Netherlands	–	o	o	o	o	o	xxo	xxo	xxx	1.63	771	PB
24	B	Margot Meri	Estonia	–	–	–	o	o	xo	xxo	xxo	xxx	1.63	771	
25	B	Emília Del Hoyo	Spain	–	o	–	o	o	o	o	xxx		1.60	736	
25	B	Hrystina Volkova	Ukraine	–	o	o	o	o	o	o	xxx		1.60	736	PB
27	B	Sanja Ristović	Serbia	–	–	o	o	o	o	xo	xxx		1.60	736	PB
28	B	Ásgerður Jana Ágústsdóttir	Iceland	–	–	o	–	xo	o	xo	xxx		1.60	736	
29	B	Staša Trajkovič	Slovenia	–	–	o	xo	xo	o	xo	xxx		1.60	736	
30	A	Jersy Díaz	Cuba	–	–	–	o	o	xo	xxo	xxx		1.60	736	
30	B	Kamilė Žiliūtė	Lithuania	–	o	o	–	xo	o	xxo	xxx		1.60	736	
32	A	Barbora Zatloukalová	Czech Republic	–	o	o	o	xo	xo	xxx			1.57	701	
33	A	Anna Nečinová	Czech Republic	o	o	o	o	o	xxo	xxx			1.57	701	
34	A	Alexandra Morrow	Canada	–	o	o	o	o	xxx				1.54	666	PB
35	A	Meg Hemphill	Japan	o	o	xo	o	o	xxx				1.54	666	PB
36	A	Lucia Quaglieri	Italy	o	o	xxo	o	o	xxx				1.54	666	PB
37	B	Noémi Szücs	Hungary	–	xo	xo	o	xxx					1.51	632	
38	B	Isabela Oliveira	Brazil	–	o	xxo	xxx						1.48	599	
39	B	Irina Velihanova	Turkmenistan	o	o	xxx							1.45	566	PB

=== Shot put ===
Rank	Group	Name	Nationality	#1	#2	#3	Result	Points	Notes
1	A	Morgan Lake	Great Britain	14.59	13.22	14.49	14.59	833	
2	B	Isabela Oliveira	Brazil	12.71	13.10	13.94	13.94	790	
3	A	Emma Stenlöf	Sweden	13.84	13.70	12.98	13.84	783	PB
4	A	Celina Leffler	Germany	13.51	x	x	13.51	761	
5	A	Barbora Zatloukalová	Czech Republic	x	12.63	13.20	13.20	741	PB
6	B	Maria Pavlova	Russia	13.19	12.92	13.08	13.19	740	PB
7	A	Andrea Medina	Spain	12.75	12.23	13.08	13.08	733	
8	B	Aliyah Johnson	Australia	13.01	12.69	12.67	13.01	728	PB
9	A	Noor Vidts	Belgium	12.89	12.69	12.98	12.98	726	
10	A	Anna Nečinová	Czech Republic	12.45	12.64	12.95	12.95	724	PB
11	B	Kristella Jurkatamm	Estonia	12.91	x	12.44	12.91	721	PB
12	B	Alysha Burnett	Australia	12.90	11.56	11.91	12.90	721	
13	B	Veranika Tsialpuk	Belarus	11.90	12.69	12.21	12.69	707	
14	B	Yelizaveta Kolokolchikova	Russia	12.62	x	–	12.62	702	
15	B	Ásgerður Jana Ágústsdóttir	Iceland	12.58	12.26	12.26	12.58	700	
16	A	Louisa Grauvogel	Germany	12.48	x	12.53	12.53	696	
17	B	Meg Hemphill	Japan	12.40	12.43	12.09	12.43	690	PB
18	B	Jersy Díaz	Cuba	12.35	12.00	10.97	12.35	684	
19	A	Giulia Sportoletti	Italy	12.32	12.23	11.34	12.32	682	
20	B	Esther Turpin	France	11.60	12.01	11.80	12.01	662	
21	B	Kamilė Žiliūtė	Lithuania	11.55	11.88	11.97	11.97	659	
22	B	Weronika Grzelak	Poland	11.05	10.00	11.95	11.95	658	PB
23	A	Fiorella Chiappe	Argentina	11.30	11.90	11.78	11.90	654	PB
24	A	Emília Del Hoyo	Spain	11.58	9.49	10.61	11.58	633	PB
25	B	Margot Meri	Estonia	11.15	11.56	11.18	11.56	632	
26	A	Inge Drost	Netherlands	11.28	9.86	11.44	11.44	624	
27	B	Staša Trajkovič	Slovenia	10.96	11.14	11.29	11.29	614	PB
28	B	Maria Huntington	Finland	10.66	10.27	11.23	11.23	610	
29	B	Sanja Ristović	Serbia	10.38	11.23	x	11.23	610	
30	A	Hrystina Volkova	Ukraine	10.61	11.01	11.16	11.16	606	PB
31	A	Lucia Quaglieri	Italy	10.92	10.70	11.16	11.16	606	
32	A	Johanna Dyremark	Sweden	x	11.10	9.76	11.10	602	
33	A	Irina Velihanova	Turkmenistan	10.62	x	11.01	11.01	596	PB
34	A	Robyn Buckingham	Canada	10.71	10.52	10.06	10.71	576	
35	B	Fiona Espagnet	France	9.89	10.58	10.41	10.58	567	
36	B	Alexa Harmon-Thomas	United States	10.44	10.08	–	10.44	558	
37	A	Alexandra Morrow	Canada	10.23	9.85	9.92	10.23	545	PB
38	A	Naomi Urbano	Mexico	9.90	10.17	9.27	10.17	541	
39	B	Noémi Szücs	Hungary	9.52	9.03	9.88	9.52	522	

=== 200 metres ===
Rank	Heat	Name	Nationality	Time	Points	Notes
1	5	Celina Leffler	Germany	24.48	935	
2	1	Inge Drost	Netherlands	24.83	902	PB
3	5	Louisa Grauvogel	Germany	25.07	880	
4	5	Johanna Dyremark	Sweden	25.33	857	PB
5	5	Andrea Medina	Spain	25.39	851	PB
6	1	Jersy Díaz	Cuba	25.52	840	PB
7	5	Morgan Lake	Great Britain	25.56	836	
8	5	Alexa Harmon-Thomas	United States	25.58	834	
9	5	Aliyah Johnson	Australia	25.70	824	
10	1	Meg Hemphill	Japan	25.71	823	PB
11	4	Kristella Jurkatamm	Estonia	25.77	817	SB
12	4	Emma Stenlöf	Sweden	25.80	815	
13	4	Noor Vidts	Belgium	25.82	813	PB
14	4	Fiona Espagnet	France	25.87	809	PB
15	3	Anna Nečinová	Czech Republic	25.97	800	PB
15	4	Fiorella Chiappe	Argentina	25.97	800	PB
17	4	Emília Del Hoyo	Spain	26.12	737	
18	4	Staša Trajkovič	Slovenia	26.16	738	
19	2	Barbora Zatloukalová	Czech Republic	26.22	778	PB
20	3	Maria Pavlova	Russia	26.30	771	SB
21	2	Weronika Grzelak	Poland	26.32	769	PB
22	4	Alexandra Morrow	Canada	26.34	768	
23	3	Lucia Quaglieri	Italy	26.35	767	
24	3	Noémi Szücs	Hungary	26.39	763	
25	1	Naomi Urbano	Mexico	26.40	763	SB
26	3	Alysha Burnett	Australia	26.46	757	
27	1	Maria Huntington	Finland	26.47	757	SB
28	2	Giulia Sportoletti	Italy	26.61	745	
29	3	Esther Turpin	France	26.77	731	
30	3	Hrystina Volkova	Ukraine	27.07	706	
31	2	Robyn Buckingham	Canada	27.09	704	
32	2	Isabela Oliveira	Brazil	27.10	704	
33	3	Sanja Ristović	Serbia	27.14	700	
34	1	Ásgerður Jana Ágústsdóttir	Iceland	27.28	689	PB
35	1	Veranika Tsialpuk	Belarus	27.37	681	PB
36	2	Kamilė Žiliūtė	Lithuania	27.51	670	
37	2	Margot Meri	Estonia	27.93	636	
38	2	Irina Velihanova	Turkmenistan	28.68	578	
	5	Yelizaveta Kolokolchikova	Russia	DNS	0	

=== Long jump ===
Rank	Group	Name	Nationality	#1	#2	#3	Result	Points	Notes
1	A	Celina Leffler	Germany	6.09	5.99	x	6.09	877	PB
2	B	Alysha Burnett	Australia	5.90	x	x	5.90	819	PB
3	A	Alexa Harmon-Thomas	United States	5.87	5.63	x	5.87	810	PB
4	B	Aliyah Johnson	Australia	5.75	5.76	5.83	5.83	798	
5	B	Weronika Grzelak	Poland	5.80	5.18	x	5.80	789	PB
6	B	Emília Del Hoyo	Spain	5.76	5.52	x	5.76	777	PB
7	A	Fiorella Chiappe	Argentina	5.74	x	x	5.74	771	
8	B	Maria Pavlova	Russia	5.67	5.52	5.73	5.73	768	
9	A	Esther Turpin	France	x	4.85	5.70	5.70	759	
10	A	Giulia Sportoletti	Italy	5.65	x	5.69	5.69	756	
11	A	Kristella Jurkatamm	Estonia	5.50	x	5.66	5.66	747	
12	B	Noémi Szücs	Hungary	5.40	x	5.65	5.65	744	PB
13	B	Johanna Dyremark	Sweden	5.63	5.40	x	5.63	738	PB
14	A	Fiona Espagnet	France	5.30	5.04	5.61	5.61	732	PB
15	A	Jersy Díaz	Cuba	5.42	x	5.60	5.60	729	
16	B	Barbora Zatloukalová	Czech Republic	5.48	x	5.54	5.54	712	PB
17	A	Louisa Grauvogel	Germany	x	5.53	x	5.53	709	
18	A	Inge Drost	Netherlands	5.52	5.26	5.44	5.52	706	PB
19	B	Staša Trajkovič	Slovenia	5.37	5.51	5.34	5.51	703	
20	B	Emma Stenlöf	Sweden	x	5.49	x	5.49	697	
21	B	Noor Vidts	Belgium	x	5.38	5.47	5.47	691	SB
22	A	Alexandra Morrow	Canada	5.25	5.35	5.47	5.47	691	PB
23	A	Sanja Ristović	Serbia	x	5.01	5.40	5.40	671	PB
24	A	Lucia Quaglieri	Italy	5.36	4.85	5.34	5.36	660	PB
25	B	Isabela Oliveira	Brazil	5.07	5.32	5.05	5.32	648	PB
26	B	Andrea Medina	Spain	x	5.28	x	5.28	637	
27	B	Hrystina Volkova	Ukraine	5.13	5.27	5.03	5.27	634	
28	A	Robyn Buckingham	Canada	5.07	5.19	5.21	5.21	617	PB
29	B	Naomi Urbano	Mexico	x	x	5.21	5.21	617	PB
30	A	Meg Hemphill	Japan	5.11	4.89	5.17	5.17	606	PB
31	A	Veranika Tsialpuk	Belarus	5.11	4.90	4.82	5.11	589	
32	A	Irina Velihanova	Turkmenistan	5.06	x	5.09	5.09	584	
33	B	Ásgerður Jana Ágústsdóttir	Iceland	5.02	x	x	5.02	565	
34	B	Kamilė Žiliūtė	Lithuania	x	4.99	4.89	4.99	557	
35	A	Margot Meri	Estonia	4.96	x	4.92	4.96	548	PB
36	B	Anna Nečinová	Czech Republic	4.30	x	4.78	4.78	500	
37	A	Morgan Lake	Great Britain	4.63	x	x	4.63	461	
	B	Yelizaveta Kolokolchikova	Russia				DNS	0	
	B	Maria Huntington	Finland				DNS	0	

=== Javelin throw ===
Rank	Group	Name	Nationality	#1	#2	#3	Result	Points	Notes
1	A	Meg Hemphill	Japan	37.08	38.46	46.61	46.61	795	PB
2	B	Alysha Burnett	Australia	42.77	44.87	42.36	44.87	761	PB
3	B	Louisa Grauvogel	Germany	42.30	44.65	42.59	44.65	757	PB
4	B	Kamilė Žiliūtė	Lithuania	32.65	x	44.35	44.35	751	PB
5	B	Giulia Sportoletti	Italy	41.53	37.33	x	41.53	697	PB
6	B	Celina Leffler	Germany	36.53	40.95	38.54	40.95	686	PB
7	B	Aliyah Johnson	Australia	35.31	39.05	40.73	40.73	681	PB
8	B	Barbora Zatloukalová	Czech Republic	38.43	35.11	39.46	39.46	657	PB
9	A	Emma Stenlöf	Sweden	36.79	x	38.81	38.81	644	PB
10	A	Veranika Tsialpuk	Belarus	36.96	32.72	38.78	38.78	644	PB
11	B	Margot Meri	Estonia	37.62	x	38.15	38.15	632	
12	A	Fiona Espagnet	France	37.80	33.91	33.27	37.80	625	PB
13	B	Robyn Buckingham	Canada	37.59	34.79	34.47	37.59	621	
14	B	Kristella Jurkatamm	Estonia	35.30	37.52	35.71	37.52	620	PB
15	B	Esther Turpin	France	x	x	37.24	37.24	614	
16	A	Hrystina Volkova	Ukraine	36.21	33.29	30.23	36.21	595	PB
17	A	Andrea Medina	Spain	34.31	30.10	36.18	36.18	594	PB
18	A	Irina Velihanova	Turkmenistan	35.99	34.17	31.55	35.99	591	PB
19	B	Lucia Quaglieri	Italy	30.30	34.40	35.65	35.65	584	
20	B	Anna Nečinová	Czech Republic	31.36	33.99	35.27	35.27	577	
21	B	Fiorella Chiappe	Argentina	30.76	33.38	34.75	34.75	567	
22	A	Inge Drost	Netherlands	34.44	x	29.56	34.44	561	PB
23	A	Maria Pavlova	Russia	33.67	x	33.18	33.67	546	PB
24	A	Noémi Szücs	Hungary	32.72	29.98	29.17	32.72	528	PB
25	A	Jersy Díaz	Cuba	32.15	31.24	28.66	32.15	517	
26	A	Alexandra Morrow	Canada	25.80	31.15	24.98	31.15	498	PB
27	B	Morgan Lake	Great Britain	x	30.81	x	30.81	498	
28	A	Johanna Dyremark	Sweden	30.65	29.18	29.36	30.65	489	
29	A	Naomi Urbano	Mexico	29.20	30.58	25.23	30.58	488	
30	B	Isabela Oliveira	Brazil	x	30.57	28.48	30.57	487	
31	A	Weronika Grzelak	Poland	x	30.15	x	30.15	479	
32	A	Staša Trajkovič	Slovenia	29.84	x	x	29.84	474	
33	A	Noor Vidts	Belgium	29.60	26.30	29.46	29.60	469	PB
34	A	Sanja Ristović	Serbia	28.82	25.30	x	28.82	454	
35	A	Emília Del Hoyo	Spain	28.16	x	27.27	28.16	442	
36	A	Alexa Harmon-Thomas	United States	x	x	21.58	21.58	318	
	B	Ásgerður Jana Ágústsdóttir	Iceland	x	x	x	NM	0	
	B	Maria Huntington	Finland				DNS	0	
	B	Yelizaveta Kolokolchikova	Russia				DNS	0	

=== 800 metres ===
Rank	Heat	Name	Nationality	Time	Points	Notes
1	3	Fiorella Chiappe	Argentina	2:14.87	895	PB
2	3	Meg Hemphill	Japan	2:15.70	883	PB
3	1	Naomi Urbano	Mexico	2:18.58	843	PB
4	4	Louisa Grauvogel	Germany	2:19.26	834	PB
5	3	Johanna Dyremark	Sweden	2:20.06	823	PB
6	3	Esther Turpin	France	2:20.37	818	PB
7	3	Noor Vidts	Belgium	2:20.85	812	PB
8	4	Inge Drost	Netherlands	2:21.52	803	
9	3	Giulia Sportoletti	Italy	2:21.70	801	PB
10	2	Alexa Harmon-Thomas	United States	2:21.99	797	PB
11	2	Lucia Quaglieri	Italy	2:23.27	780	PB
12	2	Emília Del Hoyo	Spain	2:24.16	768	PB
13	2	Jersy Díaz	Cuba	2:24.91	758	
14	1	Noémi Szücs	Hungary	2:25.13	755	PB
15	1	Robyn Buckingham	Canada	2:25.25	754	
16	4	Celina Leffler	Germany	2:26.32	740	
17	2	Hrystina Volkova	Ukraine	2:27.24	728	
18	3	Barbora Zatloukalová	Czech Republic	2:27.46	725	PB
19	4	Maria Pavlova	Russia	2:28.22	715	
20	3	Fiona Espagnet	France	2:28.25	715	PB
21	4	Emma Stenlöf	Sweden	2:29.03	705	
22	4	Andrea Medina	Spain	2:29.84	695	
23	1	Irina Velihanova	Turkmenistan	2:30.14	691	
24	4	Aliyah Johnson	Australia	2:30.53	686	
25	4	Kristella Jurkatamm	Estonia	2:30.76	683	PB
26	4	Alysha Burnett	Australia	2:31.56	673	
27	3	Weronika Grzelak	Poland	2:32.14	666	PB
28	1	Staša Trajkovič	Slovenia	2:33.85	645	PB
29	1	Ásgerður Jana Ágústsdóttir	Iceland	2:34.82	634	PB
30	2	Veranika Tsialpuk	Belarus	2:35.05	631	
31	1	Margot Meri	Estonia	2:36.19	617	PB
32	1	Sanja Ristović	Serbia	2:39.76	576	PB
33	2	Kamilė Žiliūtė	Lithuania	2:44.18	526	
34	2	Anna Nečinová	Czech Republic	2:44.99	517	
	1	Alexandra Morrow	Canada	DQ	0	
	2	Isabela Oliveira	Brazil	DNS	0	
	4	Morgan Lake	Great Britain	DNS	0	

=== Final results ===
Rank	Name	Nationality	100mh	HJ	SP	200m	LJ	JT	800m	Points	Notes
1st place, gold medalist(s)	Celina Leffler	Germany	977	771	761	935	877	686	740	5747	CR
2nd place, silver medalist(s)	Emma Stenlöf	Sweden	993	953	783	815	697	644	705	5590	PB
3rd place, bronze medalist(s)	Louisa Grauvogel	Germany	934	771	696	880	709	757	834	5581	
4	Aliyah Johnson	Australia	988	842	728	824	798	681	686	5547	PB
5	Alysha Burnett	Australia	858	916	721	757	819	761	673	5505	PB
6	Fiorella Chiappe	Argentina	961	842	654	800	771	567	895	5490	PB
7	Meg Hemphill	Japan	991	666	690	823	606	795	883	5454	PB
8	Inge Drost	Netherlands	1052	771	624	902	706	561	803	5419	PB
9	Esther Turpin	France	956	842	662	731	759	614	818	5382	PB
10	Giulia Sportoletti	Italy	906	771	682	745	756	697	801	5358	
11	Andrea Medina	Spain	964	879	733	851	637	594	695	5353	PB
12	Maria Pavlova	Russia	916	879	740	771	768	546	715	5335	PB
13	Kristella Jurkatamm	Estonia	939	771	721	817	747	620	683	5298	PB
14	Johanna Dyremark	Sweden	910	879	602	857	738	489	823	5298	PB
15	Noor Vidts	Belgium	899	879	726	813	691	469	812	5289	PB
16	Alexa Harmon-Thomas	United States	967	916	558	834	810	318	797	5200	PB
17	Jersy Díaz	Cuba	924	736	684	840	729	517	758	5188	
18	Barbora Zatloukalová	Czech Republic	864	701	741	778	712	657	725	5178	PB
19	Fiona Espagnet	France	928	771	567	809	732	625	715	5147	PB
20	Weronika Grzelak	Poland	860	879	658	769	789	479	666	5100	PB
21	Emília Del Hoyo	Spain	909	736	633	787	777	442	768	5052	PB
22	Lucia Quaglieri	Italy	883	666	606	767	660	584	780	4946	
23	Naomi Urbano	Mexico	860	771	541	763	617	488	843	4883	PB
24	Veranika Tsialpuk	Belarus	818	771	707	681	589	644	631	4841	PB
25	Hrystina Volkova	Ukraine	817	736	606	706	634	595	728	4822	PB
26	Noémi Szücs	Hungary	862	632	522	763	744	528	755	4806	PB
27	Robyn Buckingham	Canada	738	771	576	704	617	621	754	4781	
28	Anna Nečinová	Czech Republic	895	701	724	800	500	577	517	4714	
29	Margot Meri	Estonia	860	771	632	636	548	632	617	4696	
30	Staša Trajkovič	Slovenia	723	736	614	783	703	474	645	4678	
31	Sanja Ristović	Serbia	891	736	610	700	671	454	576	4638	
32	Kamilė Žiliūtė	Lithuania	712	736	659	670	557	751	526	4611	
33	Irina Velihanova	Turkmenistan	735	566	596	578	584	591	691	4341	PB
34	Ásgerður Jana Ágústsdóttir	Iceland	717	736	700	689	565	0	634	4041	
35	Alexandra Morrow	Canada	867	666	545	768	691	498	0	4035	PB
	Yelizaveta Kolokolchikova	Russia	931	806	702	DNS	DNS	DNS	DNS	DNF	
	Morgan Lake	Great Britain	961	1106	833	836	461	492	DNS	DNF	
	Maria Huntington	Finland	897	771	610	757	DNS	DNS	DNS	DNF	
	Isabela Oliveira	Brazil	855	599	790	704	648	487	DNS	DNF	
