= Ellenwood =

Ellenwood may refer to:

- Ellenwood, Georgia, an unincorporated community in Georgia, United States
- Georgia Ellenwood (born 1995), Canadian athlete
