= 2014 World Junior Championships in Athletics – Women's heptathlon =

The women's heptathlon at the 2014 World Junior Championships in Athletics was held at the Hayward Field on 22 and 23 July.

== Medalists ==
Gold	Morgan Lake; Great Britain
Silver	Yorgelis Rodríguez; Cuba
Bronze	Nadine Visser; Netherlands

== Records ==
Prior to the competition, the records were as follows:

World Junior Record	Carolina Klüft (SWE)	6542	Munich, Germany	10 August 2002
Championship Record	Carolina Klüft (SWE)	6470	Kingston, Jamaica	20 July 2002
World Junior Leading	Yorgelis Rodríguez (CUB)	6231	Havana, Cuba	22 February 2014

== Schedule ==
Date	Time	Round
22 July 2014	10:00	100 metres hurdles
22 July 2014	11:05	High jump
22 July 2014	18:05	Shot put
22 July 2014	19:25	200 metres
23 July 2014	11:45	Long jump
23 July 2014	13:40	Javelin throw
23 July 2014	19:10	800 metres

All times are local times (UTC-7)

== Results ==
KEY:	WHJB	World Heptathlon Junior Best	CHB	Championship Heptathlon Best	WJL	World Junior Leading	NJR	National Junior Record	PB	Personal Best	SB	Seasonal Best

=== 100 metres hurdles ===
The event commenced at 09:59 on 22 July. Wind: −0.8, +1.1, +0.3 m/s.

Rank	Heat	Lane	Name	Nationality	Time	Notes	Points
1	2	6	Nadine Visser	Netherlands	13.24	CHB, SB	1089
2	2	5	Ashlee Moore	United States	13.59	PB	1037
3	2	3	Esther Turpin	France	13.85	PB	1000
4	3	4	Elizaveta Kolokolchikova	Russia	13.98	PB	981
5	2	2	Louisa Grauvogel	Germany	14.02		976
5	2	7	Celina Leffler	Germany	14.02		976
7	2	8	Emma Stenlöf	Sweden	14.06		970
8	3	6	Sofia Linde	Sweden	14.09	SB	966
9	3	8	Kristella Jurkatamm	Estonia	14.15	PB	957
10	2	1	Yorgelis Rodríguez	Cuba	14.18		953
11	1	6	Mariia Pavlova	Russia	14.27	PB	941
12	3	3	Morgan Lake	Great Britain	14.29		938
13	1	8	Caroline Agnou	Switzerland	14.31	PB	935
14	2	4	Georgia Ellenwood	Canada	14.36		928
15	1	5	Casidhe Simmons	Australia	14.46	PB	914
16	3	7	Rimma Hordiienko	Ukraine	14.50		909
17	3	2	Fiorella Chiappe	Argentina	14.53		905
18	3	5	Shaina Burns	United States	14.58		898
19	3	1	Andrea Medina	Spain	14.62		892
20	1	2	Verena Preiner	Austria	14.71	PB	880
21	1	4	Noor Vidts	Belgium	14.87		859
22	1	7	Elina Kakko	Finland	14.98		844
23	1	3	Birgit Schönfelder	Austria	15.41		788
24	1	1	Irina Velihanova	Turkmenistan	16.85	SB	614

=== High jump ===
The event commenced at 11:03 on 22 July.

Rank	Group	Name	Nationality	1.49	1.52	1.55	1.58	1.61	1.64	1.67	1.70	1.73	1.76	1.79	1.82	1.85	1.88	1.91	1.94	1.97	Result	Notes	Points
1	B	Morgan Lake	Great Britain	–	–	–	–	–	–	–	–	–	o	xxo	o	o	o	o	xo	xxx	1.94	WHJB, =WJL, NJR	1158
2	B	Yorgelis Rodríguez	Cuba	–	–	–	–	–	–	–	o	–	o	o	o	xxx					1.82		1003
3	B	Mariia Pavlova	Russia	–	–	–	–	–	o	xo	o	o	xxo	xo	xo	xxx					1.82	PB	1003
4	B	Elina Kakko	Finland	–	–	–	–	–	–	o	o	o	xo	xo	xxx						1.79	SB	966
5	B	Emma Stenlöf	Sweden	–	–	–	–	–	o	o	o	o	o	xxx							1.76	SB	928
6	B	Sofia Linde	Sweden	–	–	–	–	–	–	o	o	o	xxx								1.73		891
7	B	Nadine Visser	Netherlands	–	–	–	–	–	xo	o	xxo	o	xxx								1.73		891
8	B	Georgia Ellenwood	Canada	–	–	–	–	–	xo	o	o	xo	xxx								1.73		891
8	B	Ashlee Moore	United States	–	–	–	–	o	–	o	xo	xo	xxx								1.73		891
10	B	Rimma Hordiienko	Ukraine	–	–	–	–	o	o	o	xxo	xxo	xxx								1.73		891
11	A	Fiorella Chiappe	Argentina	–	–	–	o	o	o	o	o	xxx									1.70	SB	855
12	A	Casidhe Simmons	Australia	–	–	–	–	o	o	xo	o	xxx									1.70		855
13	A	Shaina Burns	United States	–	–	o	–	xo	o	o	xo	xxx									1.70	PB	855
14	A	Birgit Schönfelder	Austria	–	–	–	o	o	xxo	o	xo	xxx									1.70	PB	855
15	B	Noor Vidts	Belgium	–	–	–	–	o	o	o	xxx										1.67		818
16	B	Elizaveta Kolokolchikova	Russia	–	–	–	–	–	xo	o	xxx										1.67		818
17	A	Louisa Grauvogel	Germany	–	o	o	o	o	o	xxo	xxx										1.67	PB	818
18	A	Kristella Jurkatamm	Estonia	–	–	–	o	o	xxo	xxo	xxx										1.67		818
19	A	Celina Leffler	Germany	–	o	xo	o	xo	xxo	xxx											1.64		783
20	A	Esther Turpin	France	o	xo	o	xo	o	xxx												1.61		747
21	A	Caroline Agnou	Switzerland	o	o	o	o	xxx													1.58		712
22	A	Andrea Medina	Spain	–	xo	o	xo	xxx													1.58		712
22	A	Verena Preiner	Austria	o	xo	o	xo	xxx													1.58	PB	712
24	A	Irina Velihanova	Turkmenistan	o	xxx																1.49		610

=== Shot put ===
The event commenced at 18:00 on 22 July.

Rank	Group	Name	Nationality	#1	#2	#3	Result	Notes	Points
1	A	Morgan Lake	Great Britain	14.17	13.84	12.85	14.17		805
2	A	Verena Preiner	Austria	12.93	12.84	13.65	13.65	PB	771
3	A	Shaina Burns	United States	12.76	13.59	13.29	13.59		767
4	A	Yorgelis Rodríguez	Cuba	13.16	12.98	13.00	13.16		738
5	A	Emma Stenlöf	Sweden	x	12.58	12.79	12.79		713
6	A	Celina Leffler	Germany	10.59	12.19	12.69	12.69	PB	707
7	A	Nadine Visser	Netherlands	x	12.68	12.62	12.68	PB	706
8	A	Noor Vidts	Belgium	12.22	11.86	12.68	12.68	PB	706
9	B	Elizaveta Kolokolchikova	Russia	11.93	12.66	x	12.66	PB	705
10	B	Casidhe Simmons	Australia	11.40	12.58	12.00	12.58	PB	700
11	A	Sofia Linde	Sweden	12.32	12.53	12.42	12.53		696
12	A	Caroline Agnou	Switzerland	12.39	x	x	12.39		687
13	B	Birgit Schönfelder	Austria	11.02	11.62	12.31	12.31	PB	682
14	A	Rimma Hordiienko	Ukraine	12.01	12.19	x	12.19		674
15	B	Louisa Grauvogel	Germany	11.53	11.27	12.12	12.12	PB	669
16	B	Kristella Jurkatamm	Estonia	12.05	x	x	12.05	SB	664
17	B	Mariia Pavlova	Russia	11.39	11.07	11.49	11.49		627
18	B	Elina Kakko	Finland	11.31	11.14	10.62	11.31		616
19	B	Esther Turpin	France	10.01	10.97	11.08	11.08	PB	600
20	B	Andrea Medina	Spain	10.61	10.75	11.03	11.03		597
21	B	Georgia Ellenwood	Canada	10.72	10.90	10.59	10.90		589
22	B	Fiorella Chiappe	Argentina	10.57	10.51	x	10.57		567
23	B	Ashlee Moore	United States	9.87	9.33	8.97	9.87		521
24	A	Irina Velihanova	Turkmenistan	6.15	9.42	9.41	9.42		492

=== 200 metres ===
The event commenced at 19:22 on 22 July. Wind: +1.2, +0.5, -0.5 m/s.

Rank	Heat	Lane	Name	Nationality	Time	Notes	Points
1	3	4	Celina Leffler	Germany	23.90	PB	990
2	3	5	Nadine Visser	Netherlands	24.15		966
3	3	7	Morgan Lake	Great Britain	24.64		920
4	3	8	Louisa Grauvogel	Germany	24.85		901
5	1	8	Georgia Ellenwood	Canada	24.86	PB	900
6	1	6	Casidhe Simmons	Australia	24.92	PB	894
7	3	6	Ashlee Moore	United States	25.05		882
8	3	1	Yorgelis Rodríguez	Cuba	25.22		867
9	3	3	Elizaveta Kolokolchikova	Russia	25.24		865
10	1	3	Esther Turpin	France	25.35	PB	855
11	1	1	Caroline Agnou	Switzerland	25.44		847
12	1	2	Emma Stenlöf	Sweden	25.50		841
13	2	4	Noor Vidts	Belgium	25.56	PB	836
14	2	3	Verena Preiner	Austria	25.69	PB	824
15	1	7	Fiorella Chiappe	Argentina	25.71		823
15	3	2	Andrea Medina	Spain	25.71		823
17	2	6	Rimma Hordiienko	Ukraine	26.07		791
18	1	4	Mariia Pavlova	Russia	26.08		790
19	2	1	Sofia Linde	Sweden	26.13		786
20	1	5	Kristella Jurkatamm	Estonia	26.25		775
21	2	2	Birgit Schönfelder	Austria	26.54		751
22	2	7	Elina Kakko	Finland	27.16		699
23	2	5	Irina Velihanova	Turkmenistan	29.21	SB	539
	2	8	Shaina Burns	United States	DQ R163.3(a)		0

=== Long jump ===
The event commenced at 11:43 on 23 July.

Rank	Group	Name	Nationality	#1	#2	#3	Result	Notes	Points
1	A	Yorgelis Rodríguez	Cuba	5.89	6.19	5.91	6.19		908
2	A	Celina Leffler	Germany	5.71	5.85	5.99	5.99		846
3	A	Nadine Visser	Netherlands	5.67	5.99	5.81	5.99		846
4	A	Morgan Lake	Great Britain	5.74	5.90	5.54	5.90		819
5	B	Ashlee Moore	United States	3.67	5.71	5.86	5.86	PB	807
6	A	Caroline Agnou	Switzerland	5.80	5.78	x	5.80		789
7	A	Elina Kakko	Finland	5.79	x	5.76	5.79		786
8	A	Kristella Jurkatamm	Estonia	5.46	5.79	5.36	5.79		786
9	A	Emma Stenlöf	Sweden	x	5.70	5.71	5.71		762
10	A	Sofia Linde	Sweden	5.42	5.63	5.70	5.70	SB	759
11	B	Louisa Grauvogel	Germany	5.61	5.54	5.70	5.70	PB	759
12	B	Georgia Ellenwood	Canada	5.70	x	5.61	5.70	SB	759
13	A	Mariia Pavlova	Russia	5.69	5.64	5.49	5.69		756
14	B	Noor Vidts	Belgium	5.37	x	5.67	5.67		750
15	B	Casidhe Simmons	Australia	5.58	5.62	5.66	5.66		747
16	A	Elizaveta Kolokolchikova	Russia	x	5.21	5.64	5.64		741
17	B	Birgit Schönfelder	Austria	5.58	5.55	5.56	5.58		723
18	B	Verena Preiner	Austria	x	5.56	x	5.56		717
19	B	Rimma Hordiienko	Ukraine	5.35	x	5.54	5.54		712
20	B	Esther Turpin	France	5.34	x	5.42	5.42		677
21	A	Fiorella Chiappe	Argentina	5.22	5.40	5.35	5.40		671
22	B	Shaina Burns	United States	5.38	x	x	5.38	PB	665
23	B	Irina Velihanova	Turkmenistan	5.10	4.77	4.89	5.10		587
	B	Andrea Medina	Spain				DNS		0

=== Javelin throw ===
The event commenced at 13:38 on 23 July.

Rank	Group	Name	Nationality	#1	#2	#3	Result	Notes	Points
1	A	Irina Velihanova	Turkmenistan	37.86	41.39	44.72	44.72	NJR	758
2	A	Yorgelis Rodríguez	Cuba	36.84	43.36	42.66	43.36		732
3	A	Caroline Agnou	Switzerland	39.09	43.06	37.64	43.06		726
4	A	Verena Preiner	Austria	42.33	40.58	43.04	43.04	PB	726
5	B	Kristella Jurkatamm	Estonia	41.18	42.33	42.11	42.33	PB	712
6	A	Morgan Lake	Great Britain	40.49	41.66	39.77	41.66	PB	699
7	A	Louisa Grauvogel	Germany	40.49	39.48	x	40.49	PB	677
8	B	Georgia Ellenwood	Canada	39.81	37.90	37.13	39.81	PB	664
9	B	Shaina Burns	United States	37.92	39.59	39.34	39.59	PB	659
10	A	Celina Leffler	Germany	37.72	39.55	x	39.55		659
11	A	Ashlee Moore	United States	34.57	x	39.35	39.35		655
12	B	Casidhe Simmons	Australia	34.60	x	39.20	39.20	PB	652
13	B	Sofia Linde	Sweden	32.47	36.89	38.89	38.89	SB	646
14	A	Nadine Visser	Netherlands	38.76	37.13	35.54	38.76		644
15	A	Emma Stenlöf	Sweden	36.43	37.84	32.87	37.84		626
16	B	Elina Kakko	Finland	34.99	37.23	34.91	37.23	PB	614
17	A	Birgit Schönfelder	Austria	31.64	x	36.66	36.66		603
18	A	Elizaveta Kolokolchikova	Russia	34.03	x	36.43	36.43		599
19	B	Esther Turpin	France	33.91	34.36	35.26	35.26		577
20	B	Noor Vidts	Belgium	32.04	33.22	32.27	33.22	PB	538
21	B	Fiorella Chiappe	Argentina	32.63	x	x	32.63		527
22	B	Mariia Pavlova	Russia	29.75	29.93	x	29.93		475
23	B	Rimma Hordiienko	Ukraine	26.07	28.59	-	28.59		450
	B	Andrea Medina	Spain				DNS		0

=== 800 metres ===
The event commenced at 19:06 on 23 July.

Rank	Heat	Lane	Name	Nationality	Time	Notes	Points
1	2	7	Verena Preiner	Austria	2:14.46	PB	900
2	2	8	Sofia Linde	Sweden	2:16.49	SB	872
3	2	3	Georgia Ellenwood	Canada	2:17.10	PB	863
4	1	6	Noor Vidts	Belgium	2:19.14	PB	835
5	1	7	Fiorella Chiappe	Argentina	2:19.16		835
6	1	1	Birgit Schönfelder	Austria	2:19.48		831
7	1	2	Esther Turpin	France	2:19.84	PB	826
8	3	6	Louisa Grauvogel	Germany	2:20.18		821
9	3	3	Morgan Lake	Great Britain	2:21.06	PB	809
10	3	2	Nadine Visser	Netherlands	2:21.26		806
11	3	4	Yorgelis Rodríguez	Cuba	2:21.39		805
12	2	1	Caroline Agnou	Switzerland	2:22.47	PB	790
13	3	1	Celina Leffler	Germany	2:22.90		785
14	2	6	Elizaveta Kolokolchikova	Russia	2:23.30	SB	779
15	2	4	Mariia Pavlova	Russia	2:23.42		778
16	2	2	Kristella Jurkatamm	Estonia	2:24.57	PB	762
17	1	5	Irina Velihanova	Turkmenistan	2:25.73	PB	747
18	1	4	Shaina Burns	United States	2:26.43		738
19	3	8	Emma Stenlöf	Sweden	2:27.71		722
20	3	7	Casidhe Simmons	Australia	2:29.66	PB	697
21	3	5	Ashlee Moore	United States	2:31.57		673
22	2	5	Elina Kakko	Finland	2:42.25		547
	1	3	Rimma Hordiienko	Ukraine	DNS		0

== Final standings ==
The combined summary was as follows:

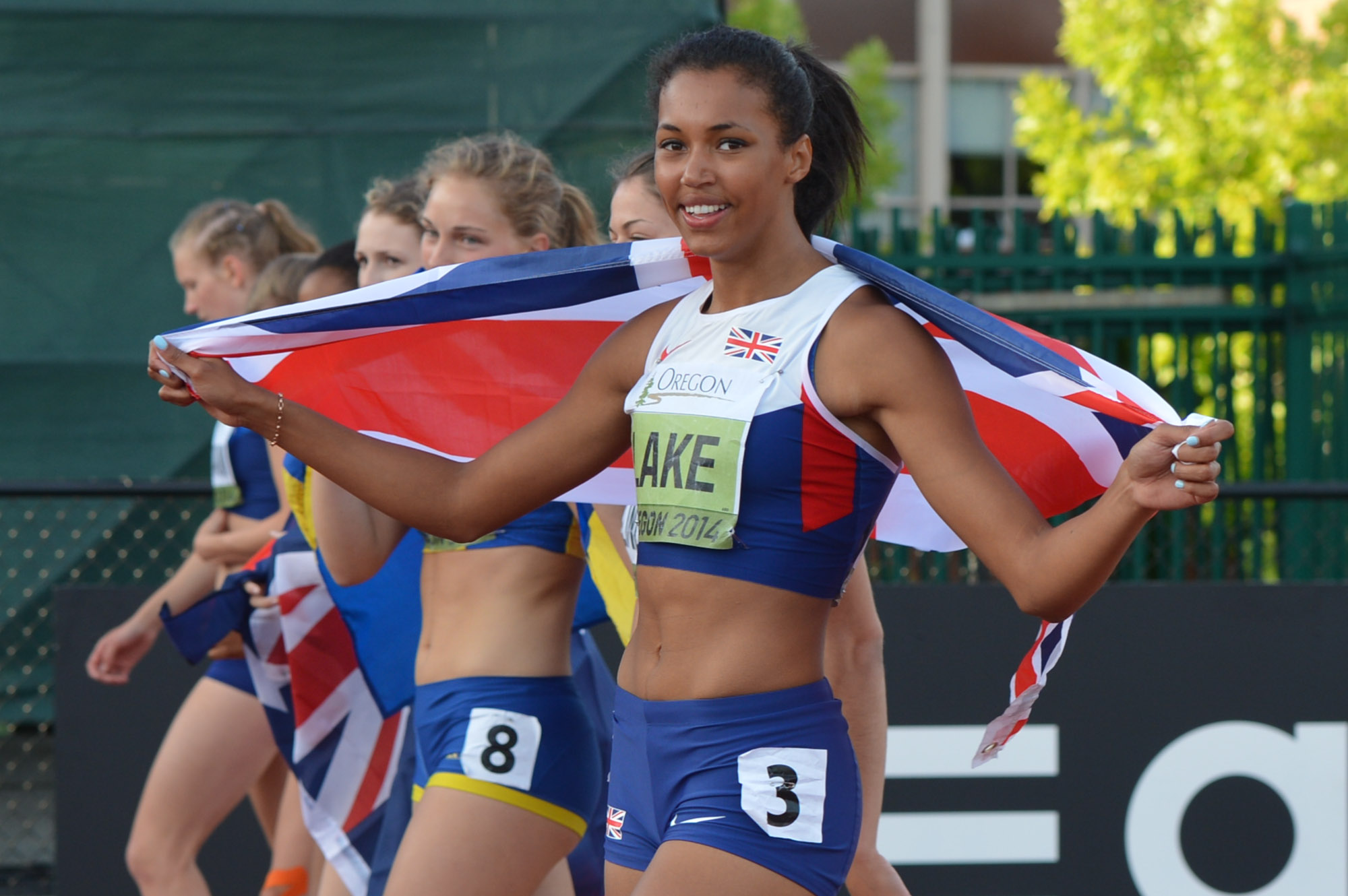
The winner Morgan Lake after the end of competition

Rank	Name	Nationality	Points	Notes
1st place, gold medalist(s)	Morgan Lake	Great Britain	6148	PB
2nd place, silver medalist(s)	Yorgelis Rodríguez	Cuba	6006	
3rd place, bronze medalist(s)	Nadine Visser	Netherlands	5948	
4	Celina Leffler	Germany	5746	
5	Louisa Grauvogel	Germany	5621	PB
6	Sofia Linde	Sweden	5616	
7	Georgia Ellenwood	Canada	5594	PB
8	Emma Stenlöf	Sweden	5562	
9	Verena Preiner	Austria	5530	PB
10	Elizaveta Kolokolchikova	Russia	5488	
11	Caroline Agnou	Switzerland	5486	
12	Kristella Jurkatamm	Estonia	5474	
13	Ashlee Moore	United States	5466	PB
14	Casidhe Simmons	Australia	5459	PB
15	Mariia Pavlova	Russia	5370	
16	Noor Vidts	Belgium	5342	
17	Esther Turpin	France	5282	
18	Birgit Schönfelder	Austria	5233	
19	Fiorella Chiappe	Argentina	5183	
20	Elina Kakko	Finland	5072	
21	Shaina Burns	United States	4582	
22	Irina Velihanova	Turkmenistan	4347	
	Rimma Hordiienko	Ukraine	DNF	
	Andrea Medina	Spain	DNF	
