= 2016 IAAF World Indoor Championships – Women's pentathlon =

Women's pentathlon at the 2016 IAAF World Indoor Championships
- Venue: Oregon Convention Center
- Dates: March 18
- Competitors: 12 from 9 nations
- Winning points: 4881

Medalists
gold medal	Brianne Theisen-Eaton	Canada
silver medal	Alina Fyodorova	Ukraine
bronze medal	Barbara Nwaba	United States

The women's pentathlon at the 2016 IAAF World Indoor Championships took place on March 18, 2016.

Returning silver medalist Brianne Theisen-Eaton came in with high expectations. She started the 60m hurdles with the fastest time of the day. Her high jump was the second best putting her firmly in the lead. In the shot put, Theisen-Eaton's 13.70 put her in the middle of the field, but paled in comparison to Alina Fyodorova's 15.44 personal best. And Anastasiya Mokhnyuk's 15.01 pushed both Ukrainian women ahead. In the Long Jump, extended her lead with a 6.66 personal best, while Fyodorova maintained second place. Going into the final event, the 800 metres, the medalists were apparently settled, Theisen-Eaton over a hundred points ahead of 4th place Györgyi Zsivoczky-Farkas but 36 points behind Fodorova and 140 points behind Mokhnyuk. Theisen-Eaton's faster 800 expected to overtake Fodorova for silver. In the race, Barbara Nwaba charged out to the lead with Theisen-Eaton marking her through 30 and 33 second laps. Even with the fast first half of the race, by the end of the third lap the lead pair had not dropped the pack enough to change the outcome. But Theisen-Eaton launched into a sprint that ultimately beat Nwaba to the finish line, a personal best 2:09.99 worth 965 points. Nwaba's 2:10.07 gave her enough of a gap on Zsivoczky-Farkas to get 4th place by 5 points. Further behind were Fodorova and even further to Mokhnyuk. Not only had Theisen-Eaton advanced to silver, she gained enough to get gold.

Less than a month after the event, Mokhnyuk tested positive for meldonium. The IAAF officially disqualified her in January 2019 and awarded the bronze medal Barbara Nwaba. Meldonium was only added to the list of prohibited substances on January 1, 2016. WADA is investigating whether a plethora of positive test results from early 2016 could be the residual result of usage prior to the ban.

== Results ==
=== 60 metres hurdles ===
The 60 metres hurdles were started at 11:15.

Rank	Heat	Name	Nationality	Time	Points	Notes
1	2	Brianne Theisen-Eaton	Canada	8.04	1120	PB
2	2	Anastasiya Mokhnyuk	Ukraine	8.11	1104	PB
3	1	Alina Fyodorova	Ukraine	8.27	1068	PB
4	2	Kendell Williams	United States	8.31	1059	
5	2	Kateřina Cachová	Czech Republic	8.34	1052	
6	1	Barbara Nwaba	United States	8.43	1032	SB
7	2	Makeba Alcide	Saint Lucia	8.47	1024	
8	1	Celina Leffler	Germany	8.49	1019	SB
9	1	Györgyi Zsivoczky-Farkas	Hungary	8.56	1004	
10	1	Georgia Ellenwood	Canada	8.64	987	
11	1	Morgan Lake	Great Britain	8.70	974	
12	2	Salcia Slack	Jamaica	8.72	969	

=== High jump ===
The high jump was started at 12:15.

Rank	Athlete	Nationality	1.64	1.67	1.70	1.73	1.76	1.79	1.82	1.85	1.88	1.91	Result	Points	Notes	Total
1	Morgan Lake	Great Britain	–	–	–	–	–	o	o	o	xo	xxx	1.88	1080		2054
2	Alina Fyodorova	Ukraine	o	o	o	o	o	o	o	o	xxx		1.85	1041	SB	2109
3	Györgyi Zsivoczky-Farkas	Hungary	–	–	o	xo	o	o	xo	o	xxx		1.85	1041	SB	2045
4	Brianne Theisen-Eaton	Canada	–	–	–	–	o	o	xo	xo	xxx		1.85	1041	SB	2161
5	Anastasiya Mokhnyuk	Ukraine	–	–	–	o	xo	o	o	xxo	xxx		1.85	1041	PB	2145
6	Kendell Williams	United States	–	–	xo	o	o	o	xxo	xxo	xxx		1.85	1041		2100
7	Barbara Nwaba	United States	–	–	o	o	o	o	xo	xxx			1.82	1003		2035
8	Kateřina Cachová	Czech Republic	o	o	o	o	o	xxo	xxx				1.79	966		2018
9	Georgia Ellenwood	Canada	–	–	o	xo	o	xxo	xxx				1.79	966		1953
10	Makeba Alcide	Saint Lucia	o	o	o	xxo	o	xxx					1.76	928		1952
11	Celina Leffler	Germany	xxo	o	xxo	xxx							1.70	855	SB	1874
	Salcia Slack	Jamaica	xxx										NM	0		969

=== Shot put ===
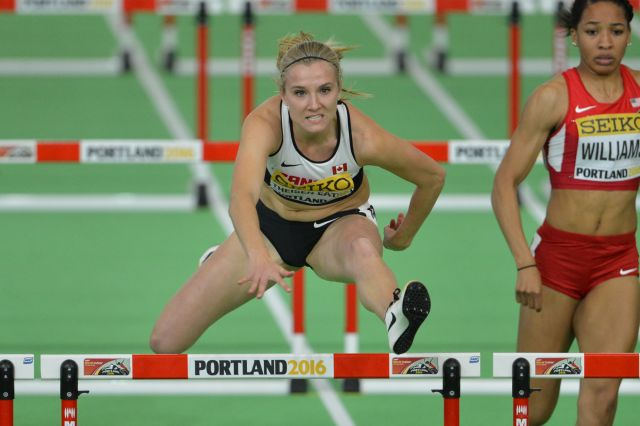
Gold medal winner, Brianne Theisen-Eaton, during the first event

The shot put was started at 14:25.

Rank	Athlete	Nationality	#1	#2	#3	Result	Points	Notes	Total
1	Alina Fyodorova	Ukraine	15.05	15.44	15.41	15.44	890		2999
2	Anastasiya Mokhnyuk	Ukraine	14.35	14.11	15.01	15.01	862	PB	3007
3	Barbara Nwaba	United States	15.00	–	–	15.00	861	PB	2896
4	Györgyi Zsivoczky-Farkas	Hungary	13.88	14.54	13.92	14.54	830	PB	2875
5	Brianne Theisen-Eaton	Canada	13.44	13.60	13.70	13.70	774	SB	2935
6	Morgan Lake	Great Britain	13.18	13.61	13.01	13.61	768	SB	2822
7	Makeba Alcide	Saint Lucia	13.46	13.20	x	13.46	758	NR	2710
8	Kendell Williams	United States	13.45	x	13.09	13.45	757		2857
9	Salcia Slack	Jamaica	13.14	13.24	x	13.24	743		1712
10	Celina Leffler	Germany	12.58	12.74	13.17	13.17	739		2613
11	Georgia Ellenwood	Canada	12.54	12.30	12.26	12.54	697		2650
12	Kateřina Cachová	Czech Republic	11.13	12.26	11.76	12.26	678	SB	2696

=== Long jump ===
The long jump was started at 17:15.

Rank	Athlete	Nationality	#1	#2	#3	Result	Points	Notes	Total
1	Anastasiya Mokhnyuk	Ukraine	6.37	6.66	6.37	6.66	1059	PB	4066
2	Brianne Theisen-Eaton	Canada	6.37	6.42	x	6.42	981	SB	3916
3	Alina Fyodorova	Ukraine	6.33	6.31	–	6.33	953	SB	3952
4	Kendell Williams	United States	x	6.30	6.10	6.30	943		3800
5	Györgyi Zsivoczky-Farkas	Hungary	6.28	x	x	6.28	937	SB	3812
6	Kateřina Cachová	Czech Republic	x	5.91	6.11	6.11	883		3579
7	Morgan Lake	Great Britain	6.03	5.88	5.95	6.03	859	SB	3681
8	Georgia Ellenwood	Canada	5.72	5.67	6.01	6.01	853		3503
9	Salcia Slack	Jamaica	x	5.93	x	5.93	828		2540
10	Makeba Alcide	Saint Lucia	5.58	5.86	5.89	5.89	816		3526
11	Barbara Nwaba	United States	5.84	x	5.76	5.84	801	SB	3697
12	Celina Leffler	Germany	5.64	5.83	5.75	5.83	798		3411

=== 800 metres ===
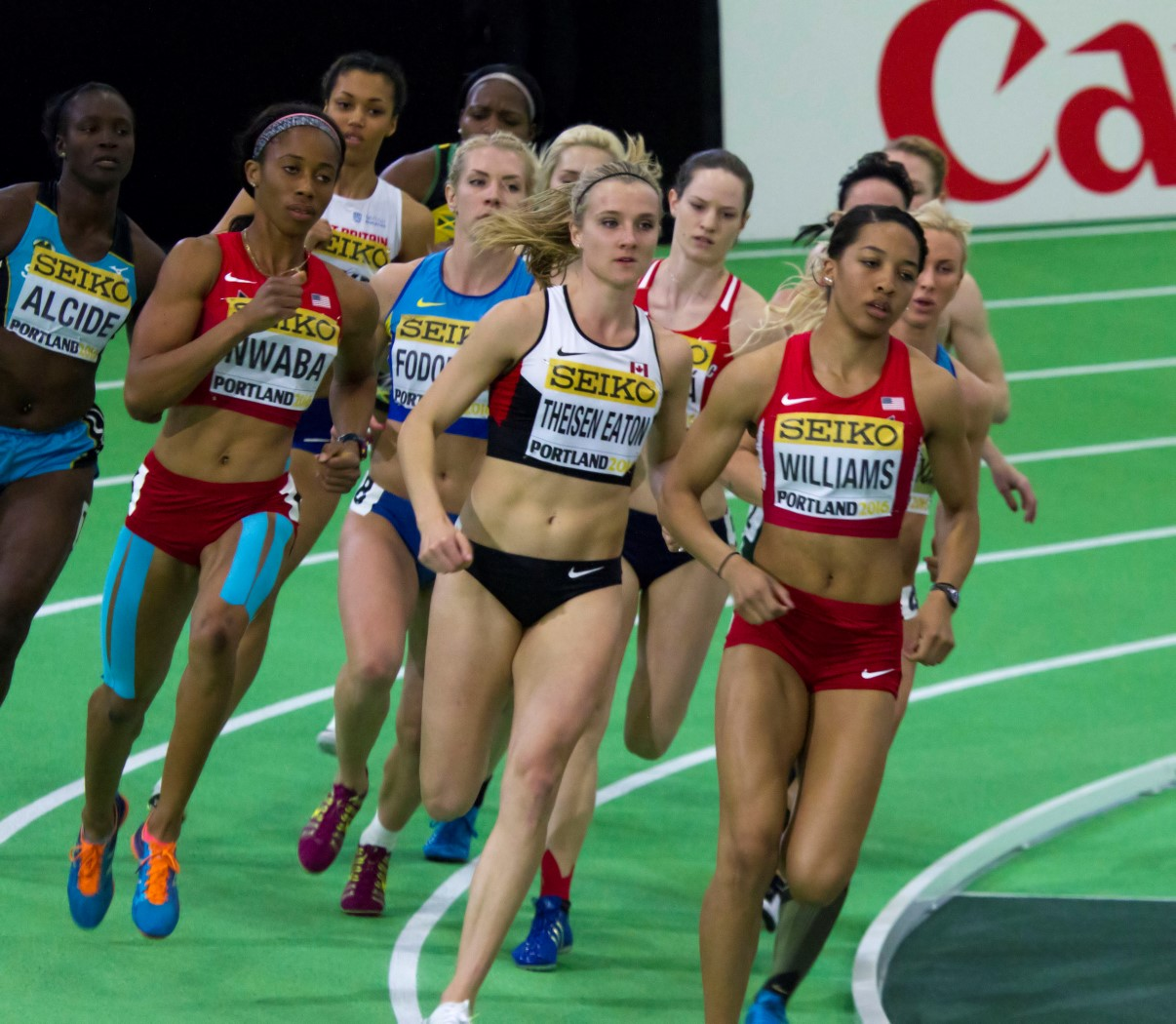
The competitors during the last event.

The 800 metres were started at 20:10.

Rank	Name	Nationality	Time	Points	Notes
1	Brianne Theisen-Eaton	Canada	2:09.99	965	SB
2	Barbara Nwaba	United States	2:10.07	964	SB
3	Györgyi Zsivoczky-Farkas	Hungary	2:18.48	844	SB
4	Makeba Alcide	Saint Lucia	2:18.65	842	SB
5	Salcia Slack	Jamaica	2:19.00	837	
6	Kateřina Cachová	Czech Republic	2:19.97	824	
7	Georgia Ellenwood	Canada	2:20.18	821	
8	Morgan Lake	Great Britain	2:20.40	818	
9	Alina Fyodorova	Ukraine	2:20.42	818	
10	Kendell Williams	United States	2:22.82	786	
11	Anastasiya Mokhnyuk	Ukraine	2:23.19	781	
12	Celina Leffler	Germany	2:24.01	770	

=== Final standing ===
After all events.

The highest mark recorded in each event is highlighted in yellow

Rank	Athlete	Nationality	60m H	HJ	SP	LJ	800m	Points	Notes
1st place, gold medalist(s)	Brianne Theisen-Eaton	Canada	8.04	1.85	13.70	6.42	2:09.99	4881	WL
2nd place, silver medalist(s)	Alina Fyodorova	Ukraine	8.27	1.85	15.44	6.33	2:20.42	4770	PB
3rd place, bronze medalist(s)	Barbara Nwaba	United States	8.43	1.82	15.00	5.84	2:10.07	4661	PB
4	Györgyi Zsivoczky-Farkas	Hungary	8.56	1.85	14.54	6.28	2:18.48	4656	SB
5	Kendell Williams	United States	8.31	1.85	13.45	6.30	2:22.82	4586	
6	Morgan Lake	Great Britain	8.70	1.88	13.61	6.03	2:20.40	4499	
7	Kateřina Cachová	Czech Republic	8.34	1.79	12.26	6.11	2:19.97	4403	
8	Makeba Alcide	Saint Lucia	8.47	1.76	13.46	5.89	2:18.65	4368	
9	Georgia Ellenwood	Canada	8.64	1.79	12.54	6.01	2:20.18	4324	
10	Celina Leffler	Germany	8.49	1.70	13.17	5.83	2:24.01	4181	
11	Salcia Slack	Jamaica	8.72	NM	13.24	5.93	2:19.00	3377	
DQ	Anastasiya Mokhnyuk	Ukraine	8.11	1.85	15.01	6.66	2:23.19	4847	PB
