= 2017 European Athletics U23 Championships – Women's heptathlon =

The women's heptathlon event at the 2017 European Athletics U23 Championships was held in Bydgoszcz, Poland, at Zdzisław Krzyszkowiak Stadium on 13 and 14 July.

== Medalists ==
Gold	Caroline Agnou; Switzerland
Silver	Verena Preiner; Austria
Bronze	Celina Leffler; Germany

== Results ==
=== Final standings ===
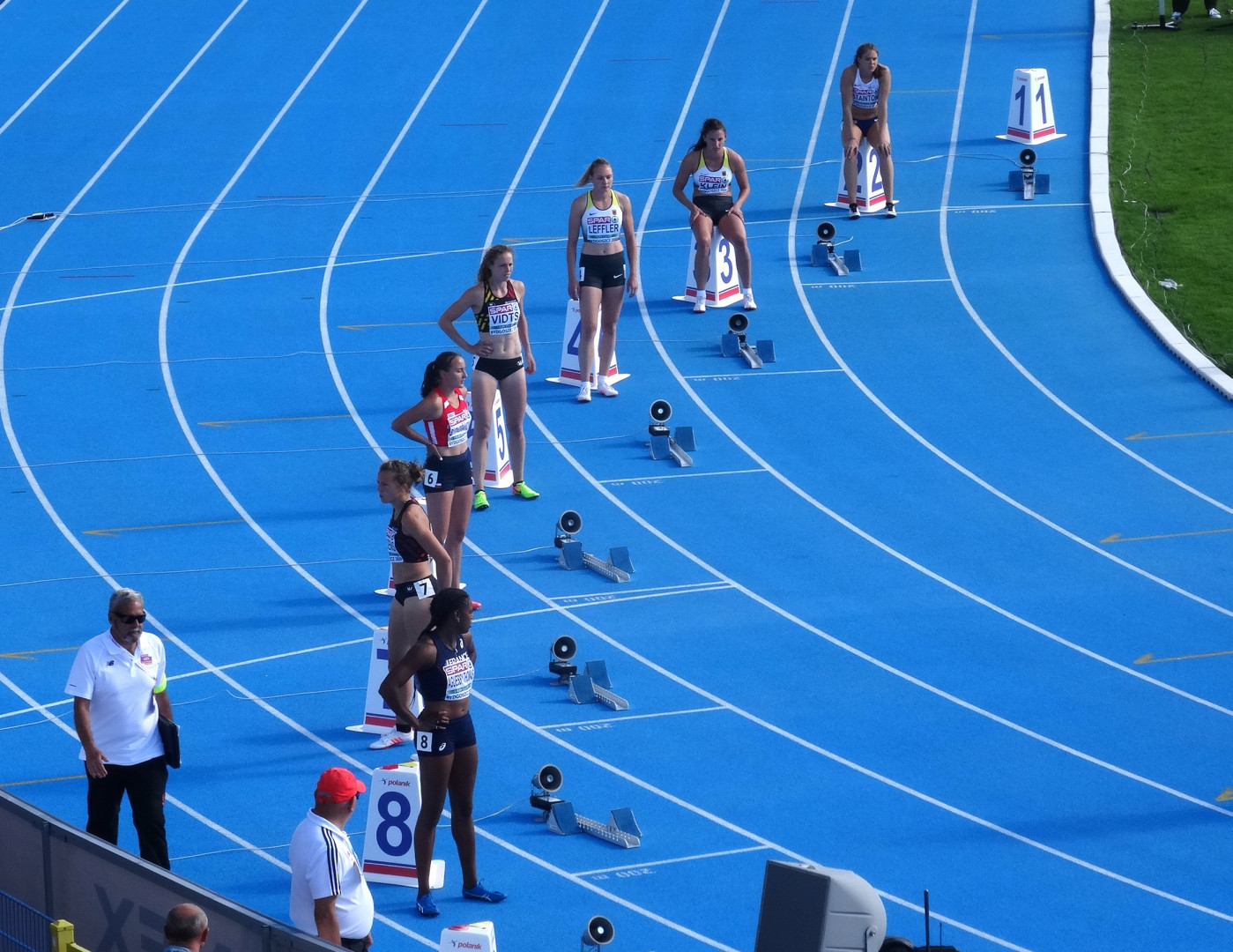
Athletes in the heat 1 of the 200m event

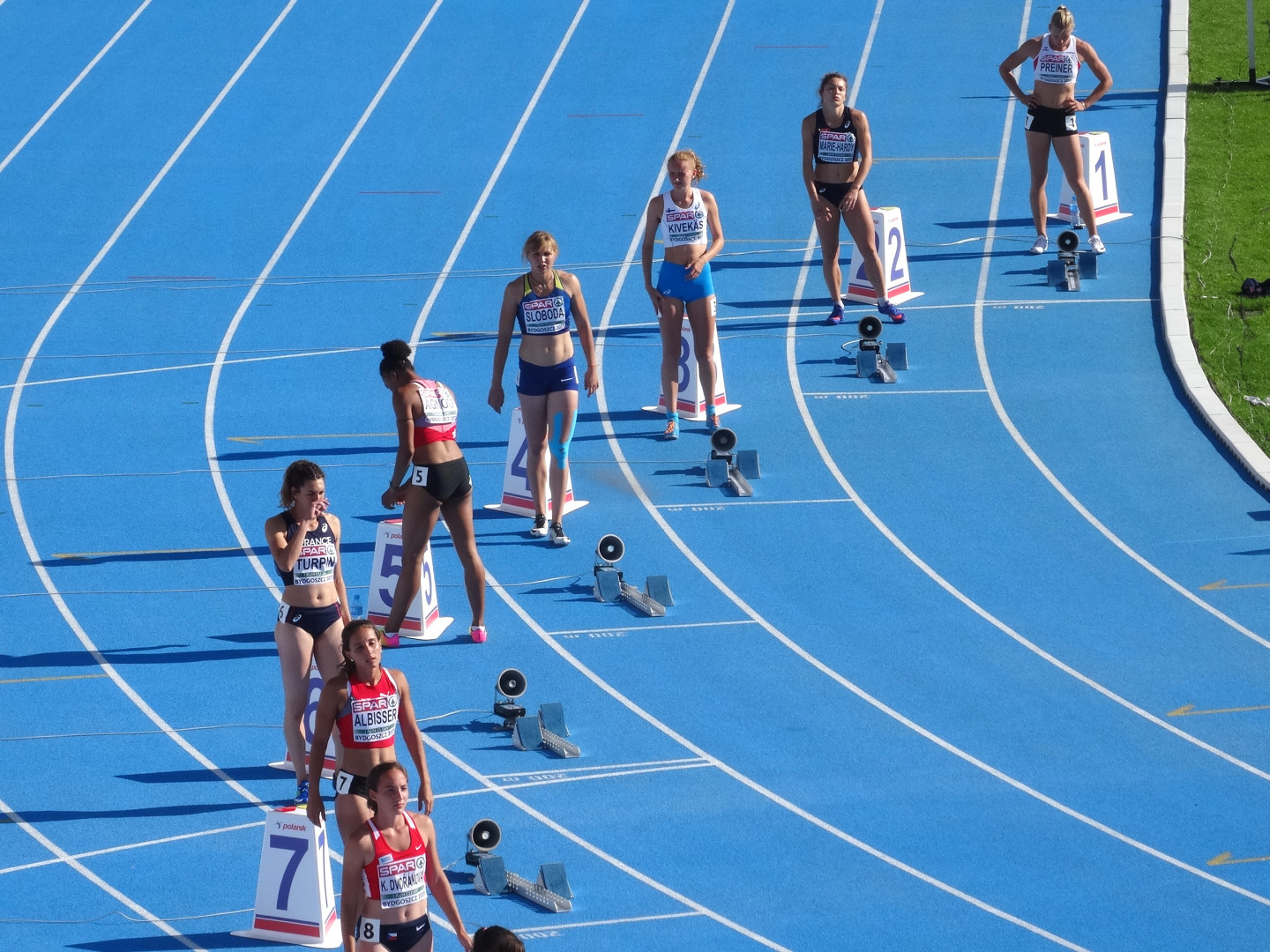
Athletes in the heat 2 of the 200m event

The highest mark recorded in each event is highlighted in yellow

Rank	Athlete	Nationality	100m H	HJ	SP	200m	LJ	JT	800m	Points	Notes
1st place, gold medalist(s)	Caroline Agnou	Switzerland	13.61	1.72	14.77	24.36	6.36	46.19	2:16.06	6330	NR
2nd place, silver medalist(s)	Verena Preiner	Austria	13.79	1.72	13.97	24.36	5.84	49.56	2:10.72	6232	NU23R
3rd place, bronze medalist(s)	Celina Leffler	Germany	13.74	1.75	14.09	23.99w	6.38	35.16	2:20.81	6070	PB
4	Esther Turpin	France	13.54	1.69	12.38	24.89	6.02	42.36	2:14.36	5940	PB
5	Noor Vidts	Belgium	13.89w	1.78	12.98	24.60w	6.20	32.72	2:15.42	5924	
6	Caroline Klein	Germany	14.03	1.75	12.45	25.33w	6.14	47.33	2:26.50	5876	
7	Katie Stainton	Great Britain	13.96w	1.66	11.61	24.16w	6.10	38.96	2:13.17	5836	
8	Daryna Sloboda	Ukraine	14.48w	1.69	13.85	25.01	5.90	36.89	2:11.02	5801	
9	Cassandre Aguessy-Thomas	France	13.87w	1.75	12.27	24.59w	6.20	37.07	2:25.21	5794	PB
10	Paulina Ligarska	Poland	14.87	1.72	12.84	25.50w	5.78	42.01	2:21.76	5585	PB
11	Malin Skogström	Sweden	13.87	1.69	11.34	25.28w	5.89	38.70	2:21.92	5574	PB
12	Rimma Hordiyenko	Ukraine	13.81w	1.75	13.21	25.53w	5.95	35.73	2:33.30	5573	
13	Yuliya Rout	Belarus	14.33w	1.78	12.65	24.98	6.01	31.70	2:30.45	5527	
14	Diane Marie-Hardy	France	14.31w	1.66	12.28	25.14	5.78	32.94	2:13.36	5526	
15	Celine Albisser	Switzerland	14.31w	1.66	11.64	24.83	5.85	32.84	2:16.48	5487	PB
16	Lovisa Östervall	Sweden	14.39	1.72	11.25	25.52w	5.76	39.79	2:22.83	5480	SB
17	Sveva Gerevini	Italy	14.34	1.54	12.10	24.42w	5.49	41.26	2:18.57	5437	PB
18	Barbora Zatloukalová	Czech Republic	14.69	1.60	11.95	25.32w	5.60	40.75	2:17.45	5404	SB
19	Barbora Dvořáková	Czech Republic	14.46w	1.63	10.72	23.89w	5.97	33.32	2:26.39	5372	
20	Andrea Medina	Spain	14.37w	1.66	11.29	24.87w	5.53	34.26	2:19.36	5345	
21	Kateřina Dvořáková	Czech Republic	13.79	1.66	10.17	24.51	5.90	31.01	2:26.99	5333	
22	Maria Huntington	Finland	14.00w	1.72	10.59	25.90w	5.64w	37.19	2:26.15	5327	
23	Lucia Quaglieri	Italy	14.26w	1.51	11.03	25.90w	5.57	35.17	2:16.86	5139	
24	Kristella Jurkatamm	Estonia	14.32w	1.54	11.01	26.50	5.66	40.90	2:26.18	5124	
25	Hanna-Mai Vaikla	Estonia	15.20	1.60	11.97	26.56	5.48	44.13	2:27.51	5124	
26	Beatrix Szabó	Hungary	15.14	1.63	10.50	26.55	5.92	30.27	2:22.08	5008	
27	Rafaela Vitorino	Portugal	14.89	1.72	10.69	26.10	5.65	29.51	2:31.48	4983	
28	Federica Palumbo	Italy	14.49w	1.66	10.44	DQ	5.34	33.24	2:22.24	4259	
	Saga Kivekäs	Finland	13.80	1.66	10.27	29.23	DNS	–	–	DNF	
	Hanne Maudens	Belgium	14.49w	1.72	11.82	24.83	DNS	–	–	DNF	
	Miia Sillman	Finland	14.51w	1.69	10.34	DNS	–	–	–	DNF	
