= 2018 European Athletics Championships – Women's heptathlon =

Women's heptathlon at the 2018 European Athletics Championships
- Venue: Olympic Stadium
- Location: Berlin
- Dates: August 9; August 10
- Competitors: 29 from 15 nations
- Winning points: 6816

Medalists
gold medal	Nafissatou Thiam	Belgium
silver medal	Katarina Johnson-Thompson	Great Britain
bronze medal	Carolin Schäfer	Germany

The women's heptathlon at the 2018 European Athletics Championships took place at the Olympic Stadium on 9 and 10 August.

== Records ==
Standing records prior to the 2018 European Athletics Championships
World record	Jackie Joyner-Kersee (USA)	7291 pts	Seoul, South Korea	24 September 1988
European record	Carolina Klüft (SWE)	7032 pts	Osaka, Japan	26 August 2007
Championship record	Jessica Ennis (GBR)	6823 pts	Barcelona, Spain	31 July 2010
World Leading	Nafissatou Thiam (BEL)	6806 pts	Götzis, Austria	27 May 2018
European Leading	Nafissatou Thiam (BEL)	6806 pts	Götzis, Austria	27 May 2018
Broken records during the 2018 European Athletics Championships
World leading	Nafissatou Thiam (BEL)	6816 pts	Berlin, Germany	10 August 2018
European Leading	Nafissatou Thiam (BEL)	6816 pts	Berlin, Germany	10 August 2018

== Schedule ==
All times are Brasilia Time (UTC-3)

Date	Time	Round
9 August 2018	10:00; 10:50; 19:15; 20:30	100 metres hurdles High jump Shot put 200 metres
10 August 2018	10:50; 12:50; 20:20	Long jump Javelin throw 800 metres

== Results ==
=== 100 metres hurdles ===
Rank	Heat	Name	Nationality	Time	Notes	Points
1	4	Louisa Grauvogel	Germany	12.97		1129
2	4	Kateřina Cachová	Czech Republic	13.29	=SB	1081
3	4	Carolin Schäfer	Germany	13.33		1075
4	4	Katarina Johnson-Thompson	Great Britain	13.34	SB	1074
5	4	Grit Šadeiko	Estonia	13.37	SB	1069
6	4	Esther Turpin	France	13.45		1058
7	4	Anouk Vetter	Netherlands	13.55		1043
8	3	Verena Preiner	Austria	13.58		1039
9	3	Maria Huntington	Finland	13.61		1034
10	3	Xénia Krizsán	Hungary	13.64	SB	1030
11	3	Mareike Arndt	Germany	13.64		1030
11	3	Ivona Dadic	Austria	13.66		1027
13	3	Rimma Hordiyenko	Ukraine	13.68		1024
14	4	Nafissatou Thiam	Belgium	13.69		1023
15	2	Diane Marie-Hardy	France	13.85		1000
16	2	Géraldine Ruckstuhl	Switzerland	13.90	SB	993
17	2	Györgyi Zsivoczky-Farkas	Hungary	13.91		991
18	2	Lucia Vadlejch	Slovakia	13.98	SB	981
19	1	Mari Klaup	Estonia	14.00	SB	978
20	2	Hanne Maudens	Belgium	14.04		973
21	1	Noor Vidts	Belgium	14.08	SB	967
22	2	Carmen Ramos	Spain	14.18		953
23	3	Lecabela Quaresma	Portugal	14.19		952
24	2	Annik Kälin	Switzerland	14.22		947
25	1	Alina Shukh	Ukraine	14.42		920
26	1	Sarah Lagger	Austria	14.46		914
27	1	Daryna Sloboda	Ukraine	14.46	SB	914
28	1	Lisa Linnell	Sweden	14.66		887
29	1	Bianca Salming	Sweden	14.69	SB	883

=== High jump ===
Rank	Group	Name	Nationality	1.55	1.58	1.61	1.64	1.67	1.70	1.73	1.76	1.79	1.82	1.85	1.88	1.91	1.94	Result	Points	Notes	Total
1	A	Katarina Johnson-Thompson	Great Britain	–	–	–	–	–	–	–	–	–	o	o	o	o	xxx	1.91	1119	=SB	2193
1	A	Nafissatou Thiam	Belgium	–	–	–	–	–	–	–	–	–	–	o	o	o	xxx	1.91	1119		2142
3	A	Kateřina Cachová	Czech Republic	–	–	–	o	o	xo	o	xo	o	xo	xo	xxx			1.85	1041	=PB	2122
4	A	Bianca Salming	Sweden	–	–	–	–	–	o	o	o	o	o	xxx				1.82	1003		1886
5	A	Ivona Dadic	Austria	–	–	–	o	o	o	o	xo	o	o	xxx				1.82	1003	SB	2030
6	A	Xénia Krizsán	Hungary	–	–	–	–	o	o	o	o	o	xxx					1.79	966	=SB	1996
6	A	Carolin Schäfer	Germany	–	–	–	–	–	o	o	o	o	xxx					1.79	966		2041
8	A	Rimma Hordiyenko	Ukraine	–	–	–	o	o	o	o	xo	o	xxx					1.79	966		1990
9	B	Lisa Linnel	Sweden	–	–	–	–	xo	o	xxo	xo	xo	xxx					1.79	966	PB	1853
10	A	Maria Huntington	Finland	–	–	–	o	o	o	o	o	xxo	xxx					1.79	966		2000
10	B	Lecabela Quaresma	Portugal	–	–	–	o	o	o	o	o	xxo	xxx					1.79	966	SB	1918
10	A	Géraldine Ruckstuhl	Switzerland	–	–	–	–	–	o	o	o	xxo	xxx					1.79	966	SB	1959
10	B	Noor Vidts	Belgium	–	–	–	o	o	o	o	o	xxo	xxx					1.79	966	SB	1933
14	B	Esther Turpin	France	–	–	–	o	o	o	o	xo	xxo	xxx					1.79	966	PB	2024
15	B	Anouk Vetter	Netherlands	–	–	–	–	o	o	o	o	xxx						1.76	928	SB	1971
15	A	Györgyi Zsivoczky-Farkas	Hungary	–	–	–	o	o	o	o	o	xxx						1.76	928		1919
17	A	Daryna Sloboda	Ukraine	–	–	–	o	o	o	o	xo	xxx						1.76	928		1842
18	A	Alina Shukh	Ukraine	–	–	–	–	o	xo	o	xo	xxx						1.76	928		1848
19	B	Louisa Grauvogel	Germany	–	–	–	o	o	o	xxo	xo	xxx						1.76	928	PB	2057
20	B	Sarah Lagger	Austria	–	–	–	o	o	o	o	xxo	xxx						1.76	928		1842
21	B	Verena Preiner	Austria	–	–	o	o	o	o	o	xxx							1.73	891	SB	1930
22	A	Mari Klaup	Estonia	–	–	–	o	xo	o	o	xxx							1.73	891		1869
23	A	Hanne Maudens	Belgium	–	–	–	–	o	o	xo	xxx							1.73	891		1864
24	B	Grit Šadeiko	Estonia	–	–	–	o	xo	xo	xo	xxx							1.73	891		1960
25	B	Annik Kälin	Switzerland	–	–	–	o	o	o	xxx								1.70	855		1802
26	B	Diane Marie-Hardy	France	–	o	o	o	xo	xo	xxx								1.70	855	PB	1855
27	B	Lucia Vadlejch	Slovakia	–	o	o	o	o	xxx									1.67	818		1799
28	B	Mareike Arndt	Germany	–	o	o	o	xxx										1.64	783		1813
29	B	Carmen Ramos	Spain	o	o	xxo	xxx											1.61	747		1700

=== Shot put ===
Rank	Group	Name	Nationality	#1	#2	#3	Result	Notes	Points	Total
1	A	Nafissatou Thiam	Belgium	14.81	14.82	15.35	15.35	PB	884	3026
2	A	Anouk Vetter	Netherlands	12.96	14.72	14.79	14.79		847	2818
3	A	Mareike Arndt	Germany	14.49	x	14.65	14.65		837	2650
4	B	Alina Shukh	Ukraine	14.43	13.61	x	14.43	PB	823	2671
5	B	Carolin Schäfer	Germany	x	13.20	14.12	14.12	SB	802	2843
6	A	Ivona Dadic	Austria	14.06	x	13.78	14.06		798	2828
7	A	Xénia Krizsán	Hungary	13.92	13.98	13.99	13.99		793	2789
8	B	Györgyi Zsivoczky-Farkas	Hungary	13.79	13.54	13.96	13.96		791	2710
9	B	Verena Preiner	Austria	13.65	13.56	13.76	13.76		778	2708
10	A	Lecabela Quaresma	Portugal	13.13	x	13.64	13.64		770	2688
11	B	Sarah Lagger	Austria	13.45	13.11	13.54	13.54		763	2605
12	B	Daryna Sloboda	Ukraine	13.49	x	x	13.49		760	2602
13	B	Bianca Salming	Sweden	x	13.41	13.31	13.41		755	2641
14	B	Katarina Johnson-Thompson	Great Britain	12.59	13.09	12.47	13.09	SB	733	2926
15	A	Rimma Hordiyenko	Ukraine	12.66	12.96	13.00	13.00		727	2717
16	A	Géraldine Ruckstuhl	Switzerland	12.94	12.66	12.96	12.96		725	2684
17	B	Hanne Maudens	Belgium	12.90	12.17	12.43	12.90		721	2585
18	A	Kateřina Cachová	Czech Republic	12.44	12.71	11.29	12.71	SB	708	2830
19	B	Diane Marie-Hardy	France	12.14	12.66	x	12.66		705	2560
20	B	Carmen Ramos	Spain	12.54	12.29	12.35	12.54		697	2397
21	B	Grit Šadeiko	Estonia	12.50	12.35	12.22	12.50		694	2654
22	A	Esther Turpin	France	12.18	12.42	x	12.42		689	2713
23	A	Lisa Linnel	Sweden	11.26	12.34	12.05	12.34		684	2537
24	A	Maria Huntington	Finland	11.49	12.14	11.87	12.14		670	2670
25	B	Lucia Vadlejch	Slovakia	11.04	12.00	11.77	12.00		661	2460
26	A	Louisa Grauvogel	Germany	x	11.97	11.87	11.97		659	2716
27	B	Noor Vidts	Belgium	10.96	11.42	11.83	11.83		650	2583
28	A	Mari Klaup	Estonia	10.18	11.21	11.49	11.49		627	2496
29	B	Annik Kälin	Switzerland	10.74	10.74	11.34	11.34		618	2420

=== 200 metres ===
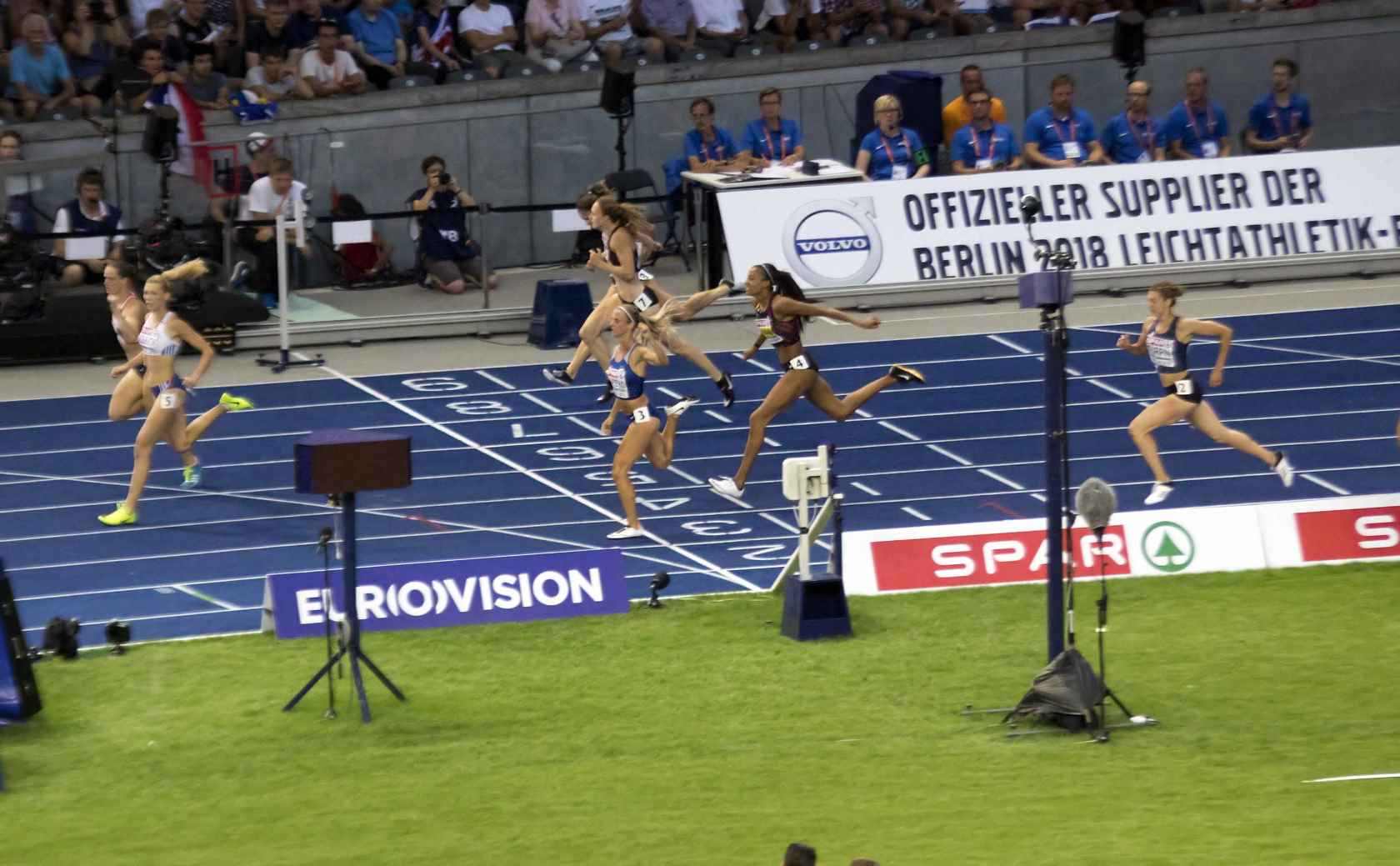
Heat 3

Rank	Heat	Name	Nationality	Time	Notes	Points	Total
1	4	Katarina Johnson-Thompson	Great Britain	22.88	CB	1091	4017
2	4	Louisa Grauvogel	Germany	23.10	PB	1069	3785
3	4	Mareike Arndt	Germany	23.61	PB	1018	3668
4	4	Ivona Dadic	Austria	23.61	PB	1018	3846
5	4	Carolin Schäfer	Germany	23.75		1005	3848
6	4	Anouk Vetter	Netherlands	23.97		984	3802
7	4	Hanne Maudens	Belgium	24.10	PB	971	3556
8	4	Verena Preiner	Austria	24.12		969	3677
9	3	Lucia Vadlejch	Slovakia	24.20	PB	962	3422
10	3	Kateřina Cachová	Czech Republic	24.25	SB	957	3787
11	3	Grit Šadeiko	Estonia	24.61		923	3577
12	3	Noor Vidts	Belgium	24.80		905	3488
13	3	Nafissatou Thiam	Belgium	24.81		904	3930
14	3	Diane Marie-Hardy	France	24.86		900	3460
15	2	Maria Huntington	Finland	25.01	PB	886	3556
16	2	Géraldine Ruckstuhl	Switzerland	25.04		883	3567
17	2	Xénia Krizsán	Hungary	25.05		882	3671
18	2	Annik Kälin	Switzerland	25.14		874	3294
19	2	Sarah Lagger	Austria	25.16		872	3477
20	3	Esther Turpin	France	25.16		872	3585
21	1	Daryna Sloboda	Ukraine	25.16	SB	872	3474
22	2	Carmen Ramos	Spain	25.18		870	3267
23	2	Rimma Hordiyenko	Ukraine	25.20		869	3586
24	1	Györgyi Zsivoczky-Farkas	Hungary	25.56		836	3546
25	1	Lecabela Quaresma	Portugal	25.61		832	3520
26	1	Lisa Linnel	Sweden	26.14		785	3322
27	1	Mari Klaup	Estonia	26.43		760	3256
28	1	Alina Shukh	Ukraine	26.57		748	3419
29	1	Bianca Salming	Sweden	26.58		747	3388

=== Long jump ===
Rank	Group	Name	Nationality	#1	#2	#3	Result	Notes	Points	Total
1	A	Katarina Johnson-Thompson	Great Britain	6.44	x	6.68	6.68		1066	5083
2	A	Nafissatou Thiam	Belgium	6.45	x	6.60	6.60		1040	4970
3	A	Hanne Maudens	Belgium	6.33	6.37	6.42	6.42		981	4537
4	A	Kateřina Cachová	Czech Republic	6.09	6.36	6.22	6.36	=SB	962	4749
5	A	Ivona Dadic	Austria	x	6.21	6.35	6.35	SB	959	4805
6	A	Anouk Vetter	Netherlands	x	6.20	6.30	6.30	SB	943	4745
7	A	Carolin Schäfer	Germany	6.24	19	x	6.24	SB	924	4772
8	A	Xénia Krizsán	Hungary	x	6.14	6.24	6.24	SB	924	4595
9	A	Lucia Vadlejch	Slovakia	5.88	6.20	6.14	6.20		912	4334
10	A	Daryna Sloboda	Ukraine	5.89	6.17	x	6.17		902	4376
11	B	Louisa Grauvogel	Germany	6.02	6.15	5.92	6.15	PB	896	4681
12	A	Sarah Lagger	Austria	x	6.14	5.35	6.14		893	4370
13	B	Lecabela Quaresma	Portugal	x	6.10	x	6.10		880	4400
14	B	Verena Preiner	Austria	5.71	6.09	x	6.09	PB	877	4554
15	A	Noor Vidts	Belgium	x	x	6.04	6.04		862	4350
16	A	Annik Kälin	Switzerland	5.95	5.92	x	5.95		834	4128
17	B	Mareike Arndt	Germany	x	5.91	5.91	5.91		822	4490
18	B	Géraldine Ruckstuhl	Switzerland	5.83	5.90	x	5.90		819	4386
19	B	Grit Šadeiko	Estonia	x	x	5.90	5.90		819	4396
20	A	Rimma Hordiyenko	Ukraine	x	5.89	5.87	5.89		816	4402
21	A	Esther Turpin	France	5.85	4.07	x	5.85		804	4389
22	B	Alina Shukh	Ukraine	5.78	5.81	5.38	5.81		792	4211
23	B	Diane Marie-Hardy	France	x	x	5.79	5.79		786	4246
24	B	Györgyi Zsivoczky-Farkas	Hungary	x	x	5.77	5.77		780	4326
25	B	Maria Huntington	Finland	5.66	x	x	5.66		747	4303
	B	Mari Klaup	Estonia	x	x	x	NM		0	3256
	B	Lisa Linnel	Sweden	x	x	–	NM		0	3322
	B	Carmen Ramos	Spain				DNS			
	B	Bianca Salming	Sweden				DNS			

=== Javelin throw ===
Rank	Group	Name	Nationality	#1	#2	#3	Result	Notes	Points	Total
1	B	Nafissatou Thiam	Belgium	46.36	53.55	57.91	57.91	CB	1014	5984
2	B	Géraldine Ruckstuhl	Switzerland	55.66	56.31	x	56.31	NU23R	983	5369
3	B	Carolin Schäfer	Germany	53.73	x	–	53.73	PB	932	5704
4	B	Anouk Vetter	Netherlands	45.26	50.08	51.25	51.25		884	5629
5	A	Alina Shukh	Ukraine	47.89	51.20	50.80	51.20		883	5094
6	B	Verena Preiner	Austria	48.79	47.16	x	48.79	SB	837	5391
7	A	Lucia Vadlejch	Slovakia	40.91	41.24	48.71	48.71	PB	835	5169
8	B	Grit Šadeiko	Estonia	46.33	48.11	47.49	48.11	SB	824	5220
9	B	Ivona Dadic	Austria	46.64	47.42	46.00	47.42		810	5615
10	B	Esther Turpin	France	46.65	x	44.00	46.65	PB	795	5184
11	B	Xénia Krizsán	Hungary	45.45	44.02	45.06	45.45		772	5367
12	A	Sarah Lagger	Austria	45.30	42.83	x	45.30		769	5139
13	A	Györgyi Zsivoczky-Farkas	Hungary	43.51	44.96	45.09	45.09		765	5091
14	B	Kateřina Cachová	Czech Republic	44.64	44.30	42.94	44.64	SB	757	5506
15	B	Louisa Grauvogel	Germany	35.39	43.29	40.45	43.29		731	5412
16	A	Mari Klaup	Estonia	42.96	–	–	42.96		724	3980
17	B	Mareike Arndt	Germany	42.58	41.77	41.32	42.58		717	5207
18	B	Katarina Johnson-Thompson	Great Britain	42.16	41.47	41.31	42.16	PB	709	5792
19	B	Maria Huntington	Finland	38.49	39.38	41.72	41.72		700	5003
20	B	Rimma Hordiyenko	Ukraine	x	5.89	5.87	41.67		699	5101
21	A	Annik Kälin	Switzerland	40.31	37.77	40.06	40.31	SB	673	4801
22	A	Daryna Sloboda	Ukraine	36.35	40.06	36.60	40.06		668	5044
23	A	Lecabela Quaresma	Portugal	39.27	x	38.29	39.27		653	5053
24	A	Hanne Maudens	Belgium	36.63	38.40	34.31	38.40		637	5174
25	A	Diane Marie-Hardy	France	x	22.20	35.14	35.14		574	4820
26	A	Noor Vidts	Belgium	24.81	–	23.88	24.81		379	4729
	A	Lisa Linnel	Sweden				DNS			
	A	Carmen Ramos	Spain				DNS			
	A	Bianca Salming	Sweden				DNS			

=== 800 metres ===
Rank	Heat	Name	Nationality	Time	Notes	Points	Total
1	2	Xénia Krizsán	Hungary	2:07.61		1000	6367
2	1	Diane Marie-Hardy	France	2:09.35	PB	974	5794
3	3	Katarina Johnson-Thompson	Great Britain	2:09.84	SB	967	6759
4	1	Daryna Sloboda	Ukraine	2:10.63		955	5999
5	3	Verena Preiner	Austria	2:11.29		946	6337
6	3	Ivona Dadic	Austria	2:11.87	SB	937	6552
7	2	Hanne Maudens	Belgium	2:12.41		930	6104
8	2	Sarah Lagger	Austria	2:13.14		919	6058
9	2	Esther Turpin	France	2:13.87		909	6093
10	3	Carolin Schäfer	Germany	2:14.65	SB	898	6602
11	1	Lecabela Quaresma	Portugal	2:14.70		897	5950
12	3	Kateřina Cachová	Czech Republic	2:14.91		894	6400
13	2	Alina Shukh	Ukraine	2:15.09		891	5985
14	3	Géraldine Ruckstuhl	Switzerland	2:15.13		891	6260
15	1	Noor Vidts	Belgium	2:16.69		869	5598
16	2	Grit Šadeiko	Estonia	2:18.78		840	6060
17	3	Nafissatou Thiam	Belgium	2:19.35		832	6816
18	2	Rimma Hordiyenko	Ukraine	2:22.23	PB	793	5894
19	3	Anouk Vetter	Netherlands	2:22.84	SB	785	6414
20	1	Annik Kälin	Switzerland	2:23.95		771	5572
21	1	Maria Huntington	Finland	2:27.25		728	5731
	2	Lucia Vadlejch	Slovakia	DQ	163.3 (a)	0	5169
	2	Mareike Arndt	Germany	DNS			
	3	Louisa Grauvogel	Germany	DNS			
	1	Mari Klaup	Estonia	DNS			
	1	Györgyi Zsivoczky-Farkas	Hungary	DNS			

Note: Mareike Arndt and Louisa Grauvogel were involved in a car crash between the second day sessions and were both taken to hospital, which forced them to withdraw from the last event.

=== Final standings ===
Rank	Name	Country	Points	Notes
1st place, gold medalist(s)	Nafissatou Thiam	Belgium	6816	WL
2nd place, silver medalist(s)	Katarina Johnson-Thompson	Great Britain	6759	PB
3rd place, bronze medalist(s)	Carolin Schäfer	Germany	6602	SB
4	Ivona Dadic	Austria	6552	NR
5	Anouk Vetter	Netherlands	6414	
6	Kateřina Cachová	Czech Republic	6400	PB
7	Xénia Krizsán	Hungary	6367	
8	Verena Preiner	Austria	6337	PB
9	Géraldine Ruckstuhl	Switzerland	6260	
10	Hanne Maudens	Belgium	6104	
11	Esther Turpin	France	6093	
12	Grit Šadeiko	Estonia	6060	
13	Sarah Lagger	Austria	6058	
14	Daryna Sloboda	Ukraine	5999	
15	Alina Shukh	Ukraine	5985	
16	Lecabela Quaresma	Portugal	5950	SB
17	Rimma Hordiyenko	Ukraine	5894	
18	Diane Marie-Hardy	France	5794	
19	Maria Huntington	Finland	5731	
20	Noor Vidts	Belgium	5598	
21	Annik Kälin	Switzerland	5572	
22	Lucia Vadlejch	Slovakia	5169	
	Mareike Arndt	Germany	DNF	
	Louisa Grauvogel	Germany	DNF	
	Mari Klaup	Estonia	DNF	
	Györgyi Zsivoczky-Farkas	Hungary	DNF	
	Lisa Linnel	Sweden	DNF	
	Carmen Ramos	Spain	DNF	
	Bianca Salming	Sweden	DNF	
