= Turkmenistan at the World Athletics Championships =

- WA code: TKM
- National federation: Amateur Athletic Federation of Turkmenistan

in Doha
- Competitors: 1
- Medals: Gold 0 Silver 0 Bronze 0 Total 0

World Athletics Championships appearances (overview)
- 1993; 1995; 1997; 1999; 2001; 2003; 2005; 2007; 2009; 2011; 2013; 2015; 2017; 2019; 2022; 2023; 2025

Turkmenistan competed at the 2019 World Championships in Athletics in Doha, Qatar, from 27 September-6 October 2019, with their sole athlete, Irina Velihanova, competing in the women's 100 m hurdles event.

== Background ==
Prior to 2019, Turkmenistan had competed at the IAAF World Athletics Championships on eleven occasions, participating since 1993 and failing to send a delegation in 1997 and 2013. Before 1993, the nation's athletes competed as part of the Soviet Union team. The country has not won any medals at the competition and as of 2017, none of the country's athletes have progressed beyond the first round.

== Results ==
Key

- Note–Ranks given for track events are within the athlete's heat only
- Q= Qualified for the next round
- q= Qualified for the next round as a fastest loser or, in field events, by position without achieving the qualifying target
- NR= National record
- PB= Personal best
- N/A = Round not applicable for the event
- Bye = Athlete not required to compete in round

=== Women ===
Track events

Athlete	Event	Heats		Semi-final		Final	
Athlete	Event	Distance	Position	Distance	Position	Distance	Position
Irina Velihanova	100 m hurdles	14.79	8	Did not advance			
