= Turkmenistan at the 2011 World Championships in Athletics =

- WA code: TKM
- National federation: Amateur Athletic Federation of Turkmenistan

in Daegu
- Competitors: 2
- Medals: Gold 0 Silver 0 Bronze 0 Total 0

World Championships in Athletics appearances (overview)
- 1993; 1995; 1997; 1999; 2001; 2003; 2005; 2007; 2009; 2011; 2013; 2015; 2017; 2019; 2022; 2023; 2025

Turkmenistan competed at the 2011 World Championships in Athletics from August 27 to September 4 in Daegu, South Korea. A team of two athletes was announced to represent the country in the event.

== Results ==
=== Men ===
Athlete	Event	Preliminaries		Heats		Semifinals		Final	
Athlete	Event	Time Width Height	Rank	Time Width Height	Rank	Time Width Height	Rank	Time Width Height	Rank
Amanmurad Hommadov	Hammer throw	62.97	35					Did not advance	

=== Women ===
Athlete	Event	Preliminaries		Heats		Semifinals		Final	
Athlete	Event	Time Width Height	Rank	Time Width Height	Rank	Time Width Height	Rank	Time Width Height	Rank
Maysa Rejepova	100 metres	13.43 (PB)	27	Did not advance					
