= Fiorella Chiappe =

Argentine athletics competitor

Personal information
- Full name: Fiorella Chiappe Madsen
- Born: January 1, 1996 (age 30)
- Education: Instituto Educativo Dr José Ingenieros
- Height: 1.74 m (5 ft 8 1/2 in)
- Weight: 58 kg (128 lb)

Sport
- Sport: Athletics
- Event(s): 400 m hurdles, heptathlon

Fiorella Chiappe y Madsen (born 1 January 1996, Barcelona, Spain) is an Argentine athlete specialising in the 400 metres hurdles. She won the gold medal in the 400 metres hurdles at the 2018 South American Games and holds the national record of 56.08. Previously she competed in the heptathlon winning, among others, a silver medal at the 2014 South American Games.

== International competitions ==
Year	Competition	Venue	Position	Event	Notes
Representing Argentina
2012	South American Youth Championships	Mendoza, Argentina	3rd	High jump	1.71 m
2012	South American Youth Championships	Mendoza, Argentina	5th	Long jump	5.60 m
2012	South American Youth Championships	Mendoza, Argentina	2nd	4 × 400 m relay	2:13.95
2013	World Youth Championships	Donetsk, Ukraine	6th	Heptathlon (youth)	5490 pts
2013	Pan American Junior Championships	Medellín, Colombia	4th	Heptathlon	5426 pts
2013	South American Junior Championships	Resistencia, Argentina	1st	Heptathlon	5452 pts
2014	South American Games	Santiago, Chile	2nd	Heptathlon	5568 pts
2014	World Junior Championships	Eugene, United States	19th	Heptathlon	5183 pts
2014	South American U23 Championships	Montevideo, Uruguay	2nd	Heptathlon	5207 pts
2015	South American Junior Championships	Cuenca, Ecuador	1st	Heptathlon	5242 pts
2015	Pan American Junior Championships	Edmonton, Canada	2nd	Heptathlon	5313 pts
2016	Ibero-American Championships	Rio de Janeiro, Brazil	–	Heptathlon	DNF
2016	South American U23 Championships	Lima, Peru	1st	Heptathlon	5149 pts
2017	South American Championships	Asunción, Paraguay	3rd	400 m hurdles	57.02
2017	South American Championships	Asunción, Paraguay	4th	4 × 400 m relay	3:40.56
2017	Universiade	Taipei, Taiwan	–	Heptathlon	DNF
2018	South American Games	Cochabamba, Bolivia	1st	400 m hurdles	56.39
2018	South American Games	Cochabamba, Bolivia	3rd	4 × 400 m relay	3:35.96
2018	Ibero-American Championships	Trujillo, Peru	1st	400 m hurdles	56.25
2018	Ibero-American Championships	Trujillo, Peru	2nd	4 × 400 m relay	3:36.99
2018	South American U23 Championships	Cuenca, Ecuador	1st	400 m hurdles	56.25
2018	South American U23 Championships	Cuenca, Ecuador	5th	4 × 400 m relay	3:45.67
2019	South American Championships	Lima, Peru	3rd	400 m hurdles	57.03
2019	South American Championships	Lima, Peru	3rd	4 × 400 m relay	3:36.76
2019	Pan American Games	Lima, Peru	15th (h)	400 m hurdles	61.42
2019	Pan American Games	Lima, Peru	8th	4 × 400 m relay	3:41.39
Representing Andorra
2025	Games of the Small States of Europe	Andorra la Vella, Andorra	4th	400 m	55.11
2025	Games of the Small States of Europe	Andorra la Vella, Andorra	5th	4 × 100 m relay	47.52
2025	Games of the Small States of Europe	Andorra la Vella, Andorra	2nd	4 × 400 m relay	3:40.58

== Personal bests ==
Outdoor

- 200 metres – 24.89 (-0.1 m/s, Rio de Janeiro 2016)
- 400 metres – 53.98 (Concepción del Uruguay 2018)
- 800 metres – 2:13.63 (Santiago de Chile 2014)
- 100 metres hurdles – 13.72 (+0.2 m/s, Buenos Aires 2017)
- 400 metres hurdles – 55.88 (Bruxelles Belgium 2018)
- High jump – 1.76 (Buenos Aires 2017)
- Long jump – 6.25 (+0.5 m/s, Buenos Aires 2017)
- Shot put – 11.33 (Buenos Aires 2017)
- Javelin throw – 35.98 (Santiago de Chile 2014)
- Heptathlon – 5815 (Buenos Aires 2017)
