= Maria Huntington =

Finnish long jumper and heptathlete

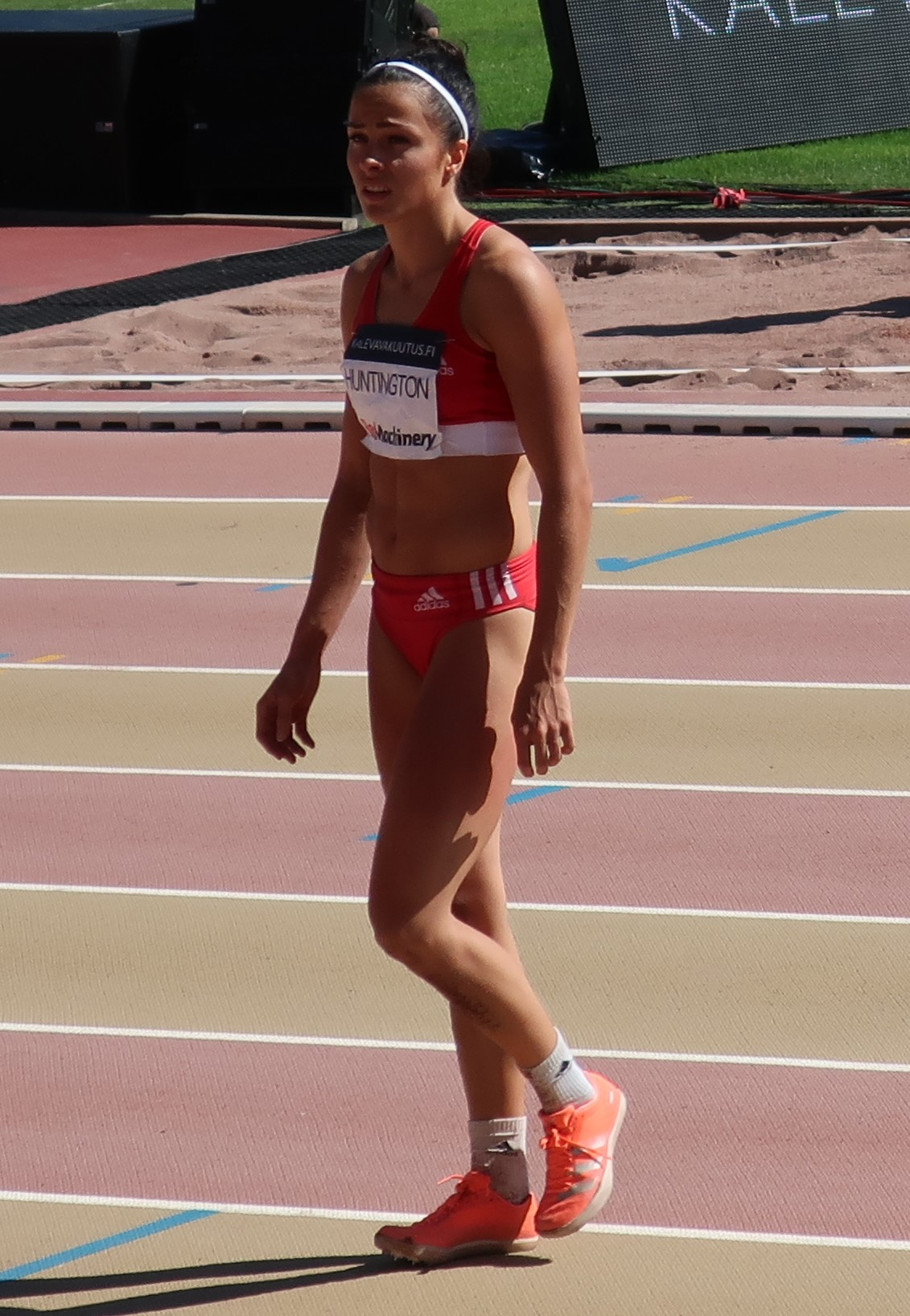
- Huntington in 2020

Personal information
- Born: March 13, 1997 (age 29)
- Height: 1.71 m (5 ft 7 1/2 in)
- Weight: 61 kg (134 lb)

Sport
- Country: Finland
- Sport: Athletics
- Event: Heptathlon

Achievements and titles
- Personal best: Heptathlon: 6,339 pts (2019)

Maria Huntington (born 13 March 1997) is a Finnish track and field athlete, specialising in heptathlon. She is coached by Matti Liimatainen.

== Early life ==
Huntington was born to a Finnish mother and an English father. She moved to Finland from England with her family when she was five years old. Huntington holds dual citizenship of Finland and the United Kingdom.

== Career ==
Huntington represented Finland in 2018 European Athletics Championships in heptathlon and finished 19th with a result of 5,731 points. She competed in the 2019 World Championships in Doha, where she withdrew from the heptathlon after the first day. In August 2021, Huntington finished in the 17th place in the hepathlon at the Tokyo Olympics with 6,135 points.

Huntington's heptathlon personal best is 6,339 points, achieved in Lappeenranta in August 2019.

In her podcast Timeout she announced her retirement due to pregnancy in January 2024.

== Competition record ==
Year	Competition	Venue	Position	Notes
Representing Finland
2015	European Junior Championships	Eskilstuna, Sweden	13th	5214 pts
2016	World U20 Championships	Bydgoszcz, Poland	DNF	
2017	European U23 Championships	Bydgoszcz, Poland	22nd	5327 pts
2018	European Championships	Berlin, Germany	19th	5731 pts
2019	European U23 Championships	Gävle, Sweden	DNF	DNF
2019	World Championships	Doha, Qatar	DNF	DNF
2021	Olympic Games	Tokyo, Japan	17th	6135 pts
