= Georgia Ellenwood =

Canadian heptathlete (born 1995)

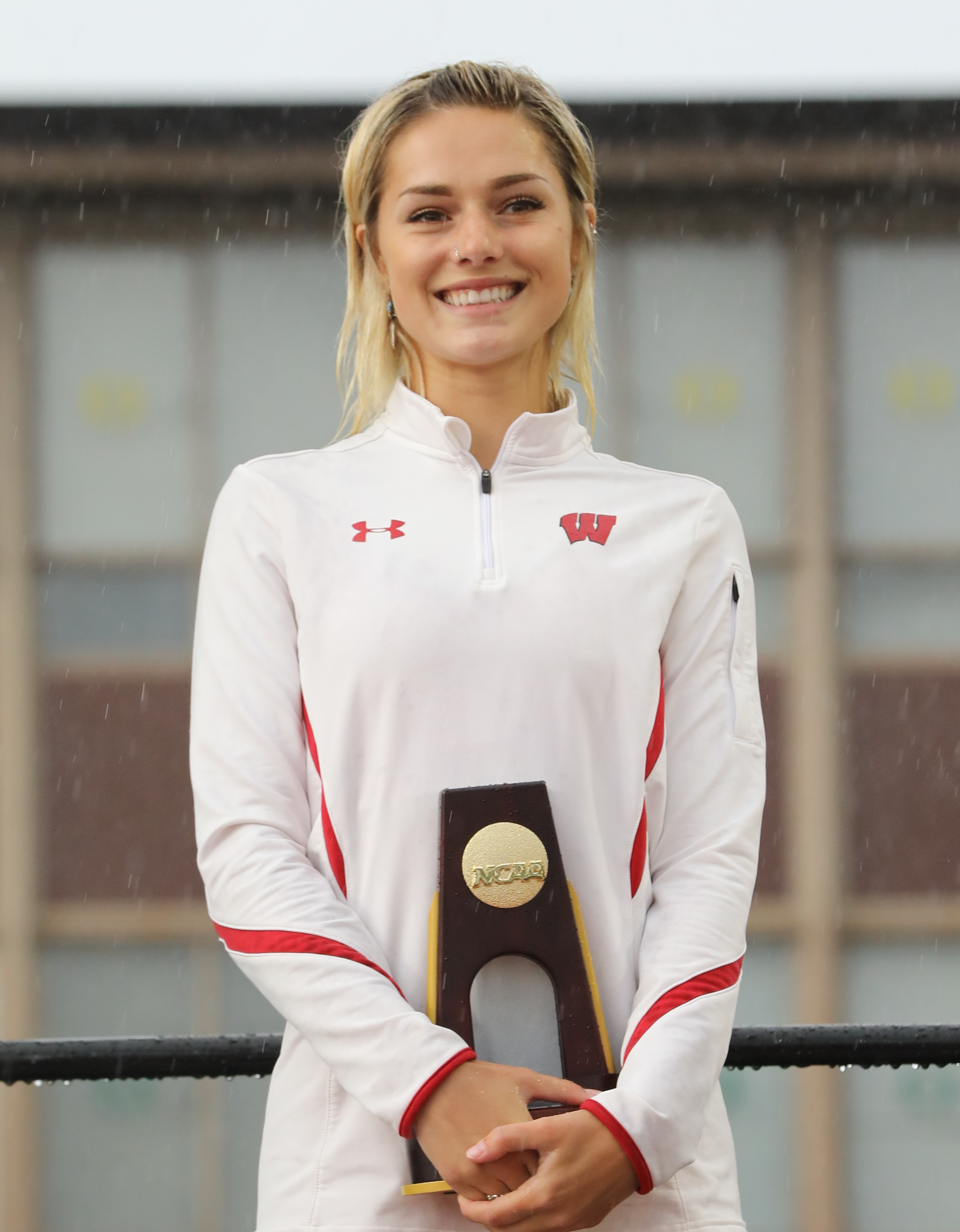
- Ellenwood after winning the heptathlon at the 2018 NCAA Division I Outdoor Track and Field Championships

Personal information
- Full name: Georgia Lorraine Ellenwood
- Born: August 5, 1995 (age 31) Vancouver, British Columbia, Canada
- Home town: Langley, British Columbia
- Education: University of Wisconsin
- Height: 170 cm (5 ft 7 in)

Sport
- Sport: Track and field
- Events: Heptathlon, pentathlon
- College team: Wisconsin Badgers
- Club: Under Armour
- Turned pro: 2018

Achievements and titles
- Personal best: Heptathlon: 6314 (Ratingen 2021)

Georgia Lorraine Ellenwood (born 5 August 1995) is a Canadian athlete who competes in combined events.

== Career ==
She represented Canada at the 2016 World Indoor Championships, finishing tenth, and also represented Canada at the 2020 Olympics in Tokyo. Georgia Ellenwood is an 8-time NCAA Division I All-American, 2018 Big Ten Conference Field athlete of the year after setting a new personal best and a Wisconsin Badgers school record. Ellenwood is a Langley Secondary School 2013 graduate. Ellenwood competed at the 2020 Summer Olympics.

== Competition record ==
Year	Competition	Venue	Position	Event	Notes
Representing Canada
2011	World Youth Championships	Lille, France	12th	Heptathlon (youth)	4952 pts
2012	World Junior Championships	Barcelona, Spain	18th	Heptathlon	5262 pts
2013	Pan American Junior Championships	Medellín, Colombia	3rd	Heptathlon	5493 pts
2014	World Junior Championships	Eugene, United States	7th	Heptathlon	5594 pts
2015	Universiade	Gwangju, South Korea	5th	Heptathlon	5665 pts
2016	World Indoor Championships	Portland, United States	9th	Pentathlon	4324 pts
2016	2016 Pan American Combined Events Cup	Ottawa, Canada	4th	Heptathlon	5814 pts
2016	NACAC U23 Championships	San Salvador, El Salvador	3rd	High jump	1.78 m
2016	NACAC U23 Championships	San Salvador, El Salvador	5th	Long jump	5.79 m
2018	2018 Pan American Combined Events Cup; Canadian Track and Field Championships	Ottawa, Canada	1st	Heptathlon	6026 pts
2021	Olympics	Tokyo, Japan	20th	Heptathlon	6077 points
2023	Pan American Games	Santiago, Chile	–	Heptathlon	DNF
Representing University of Wisconsin
2016	2016 NCAA Division I Outdoor Track and Field Championships	Eugene, United States	5th	Heptathlon	5935 pts
2017	2017 NCAA Division I Indoor Track and Field Championships	College Station, Texas	7th	Pentathlon	4162 pts
2018	2018 NCAA Division I Indoor Track and Field Championships	College Station, Texas	3rd	Pentathlon	4381 pts
2018	2018 NCAA Division I Outdoor Track and Field Championships	Eugene, United States	1st	Heptathlon	6146 pts

== Personal bests ==
Outdoor
- 200 metres – 24.22 (+1.4 m/s, Götzis 2021)
- 800 metres – 2:11.45 (Ratingen 2021)
- 100 metres hurdles – 13.40 (Ratingen 2021)
- High jump – 1.83 (Tokyo 2021)
- Long jump – 6.26 (Gotzis 2021)
- Shot put – 13.00 (Toronto 2021)
- Javelin Throw – 48.57 (Ratingen 2021)
- Heptathlon – 6314 (Ratingen 2021)
Indoor
- 800 metres – 2:14.28 (College Station 2018)
- 60 metres hurdles – 8.35 (Toronto 2022)
- High jump – 1.82 (Geneva, OH 2016)
- Long jump – 6.08 (Birmingham 2016)
- Shot put – 13.41 (Toronto 2021)
- Pentathlon – 4390 (Birmingham 2016)
