= Celina Leffler =

German athlete

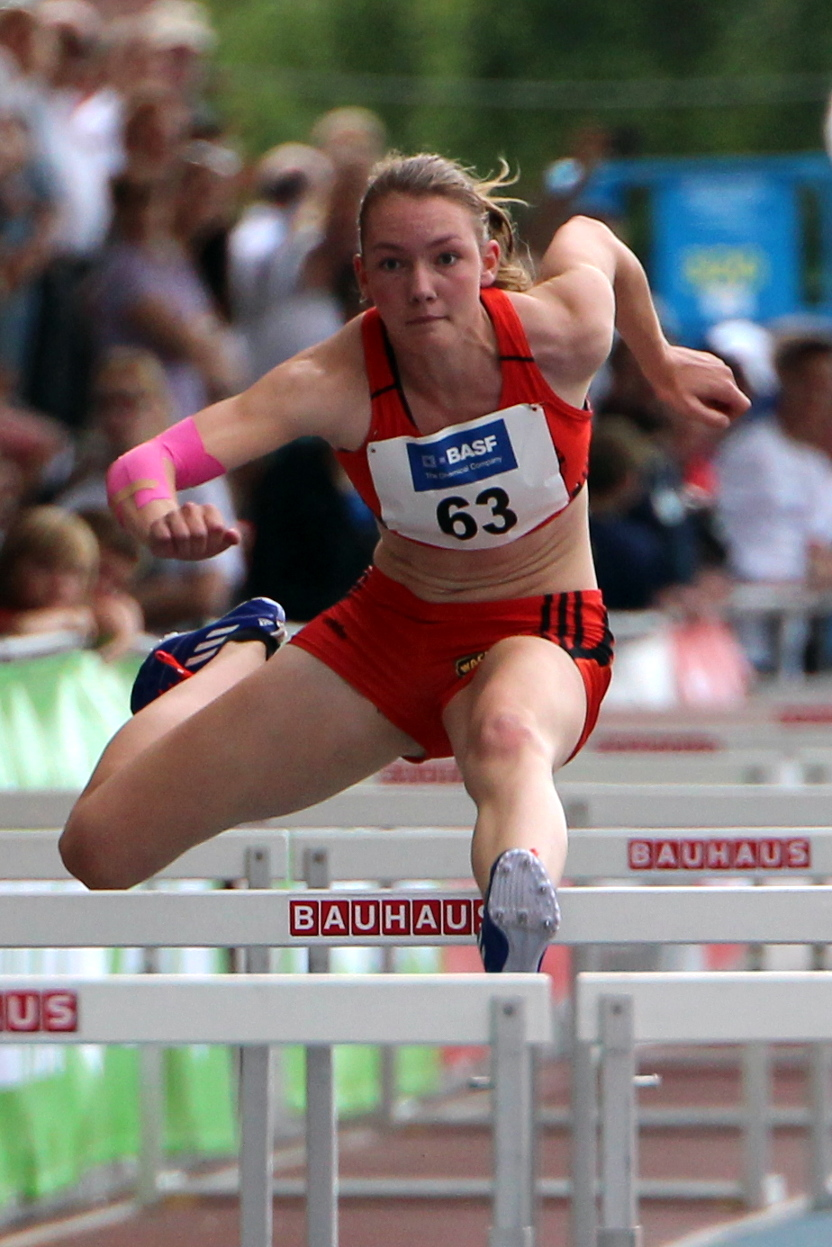

Personal information
- Born: 9 April 1996 (age 29) Lübeck, [Germany
- Height: 1.74 m (5 ft 9 in)
- Weight: 66 kg (146 lb)

Sport
- Country: Germany
- Sport: Athletics
- Event(s): Heptathlon, pentathlon
- Club: SSC Koblenz Karthause
- Coached by: Holger Klein

Celina Leffler (born 9 April 1996 in Lübeck) is a German former athlete competing in the combined events. She represented 2016 World Indoor Championships finishing eleventh. Earlier she won the gold medal at the 2013 World Youth Championships. She retired in 2019, intending to concentrate on studying medicine.

== Competition record ==
Year	Competition	Venue	Position	Event	Notes
Representing Germany
2013	World Youth Championships	Donetsk, Ukraine	1st	Heptathlon (youth)	5747 pts
2014	World Junior Championships	Eugene, United States	5th	Heptathlon	5746 pts
2016	World Indoor Championships	Portland, United States	11th	Pentathlon	4181 pts
2017	European U23 Championships	Bydgoszcz, Poland	3rd	Heptathlon	6070 pts

== Personal bests ==
Outdoor
- 100 metres – 11.72 (+1.1 m/s, Weinheim 2014)
- 200 metres – 23.90 (-0.5 m/s, Eugene 2014)
- 800 metres – 2:18.03 (Ulm 2014)
- 100 metres hurdles – 13.63 (+1.0 m/s, Jena 2015)
- High jump – 1.77 (Neuwied-Engers 2015)
- Long jump – 6.38 (+0.3 m/s, Bydgoszcz 2017)
- Shot put – 14.09 (Bydgoszcz 2017)
- Javelin throw – 43.73 (Neuwied-Engers 2015)
- Heptathlon – 6070 (Bydgoszcz 2017)
Indoor
- 800 metres – 2:22.19 (Hamburg 2016)
- 60 metres hurdles – 8.47 (Neubrandenburg 2015)
- High jump – 1.70 (Portland 2016)
- Long jump – 6.16 (Ludwigshafen 2015)
- Shot put – 14.35 (Hamburg 2016)
- Pentathlon – 4347 (Hamburg 2016)
