= Turkmenistan at the 2023 World Athletics Championships =

- Flag of Turkmenistan
- WA code: TKM

in Budapest, Hungary 19 August 2023 – 27 August 2023
- Competitors: 1 (1 man and 0 women)
- Medals: Gold 0 Silver 0 Bronze 0 Total 0

World Athletics Championships appearances (overview)
- 1993; 1995; 1997; 1999; 2001; 2003; 2005; 2007; 2009; 2011; 2013; 2015; 2017; 2019; 2022; 2023; 2025

Turkmenistan competed at the 2023 World Athletics Championships in Budapest, Hungary, which were held from 19 to 27 August 2023. The athlete delegation of the country was composed of one competitor, sprinter Alisher Sadulayev who competed in the men's 100 metres. He qualified for the Championships upon being selected by the Amateur Athletic Federation of Turkmenistan. In the preliminary round, he placed third in his heat and failed to advance further to the first round heats.

== Background ==
The 2023 World Athletics Championships in Budapest, Hungary, were held from 19 to 27 August 2023. The Championships were held at the National Athletics Centre. To qualify for the World Championships, athletes had to reach an entry standard (e.g. time or distance), place in a specific position at select competitions, be a wild card entry, or qualify through their World Athletics Ranking at the end of the qualification period.

As Turkmenistan did not meet any of the four standards, they could send either one male or one female athlete in one event of the Championships who has not yet qualified. The Amateur Athletic Federation of Turkmenistan selected sprinter Alisher Sadulayev, who would compete in the men's 100 metres. In the entry list for the Championships, he held a personal best of 10.74 seconds and a season's best of 10.81 seconds. Before the Championships, Sadulayev was coached by sprinter Valentina Meredova. He called his participation the "biggest start in my career".

== Results ==
Key

- Q = Qualified for the next round
- q = Qualified for the next round as a fastest loser or, in field events, by position without achieving the qualifying target
- NR = National record
- PB = Personal best
- SB = Season best
- N/A = Round not applicable for the event

=== Men ===
Sadulayev competed in the third preliminary round heat of the men's 100 metres on 19 August against seven other sprinters. There, he recorded a time of 10.90 seconds and placed third in his heat, failing to advance further as only the top two of each heat and the two next fastest sprinters would be able to.

Track and road events

Athlete	Event	Preliminary		Heat		Semifinal		Final	
Athlete	Event	Result	Rank	Result	Rank	Result	Rank	Result	Rank
Alisher Sadulayev	100 metres	10.90	3	Did not advance					
