= Esther Turpin =

French heptathlete (born 1996)

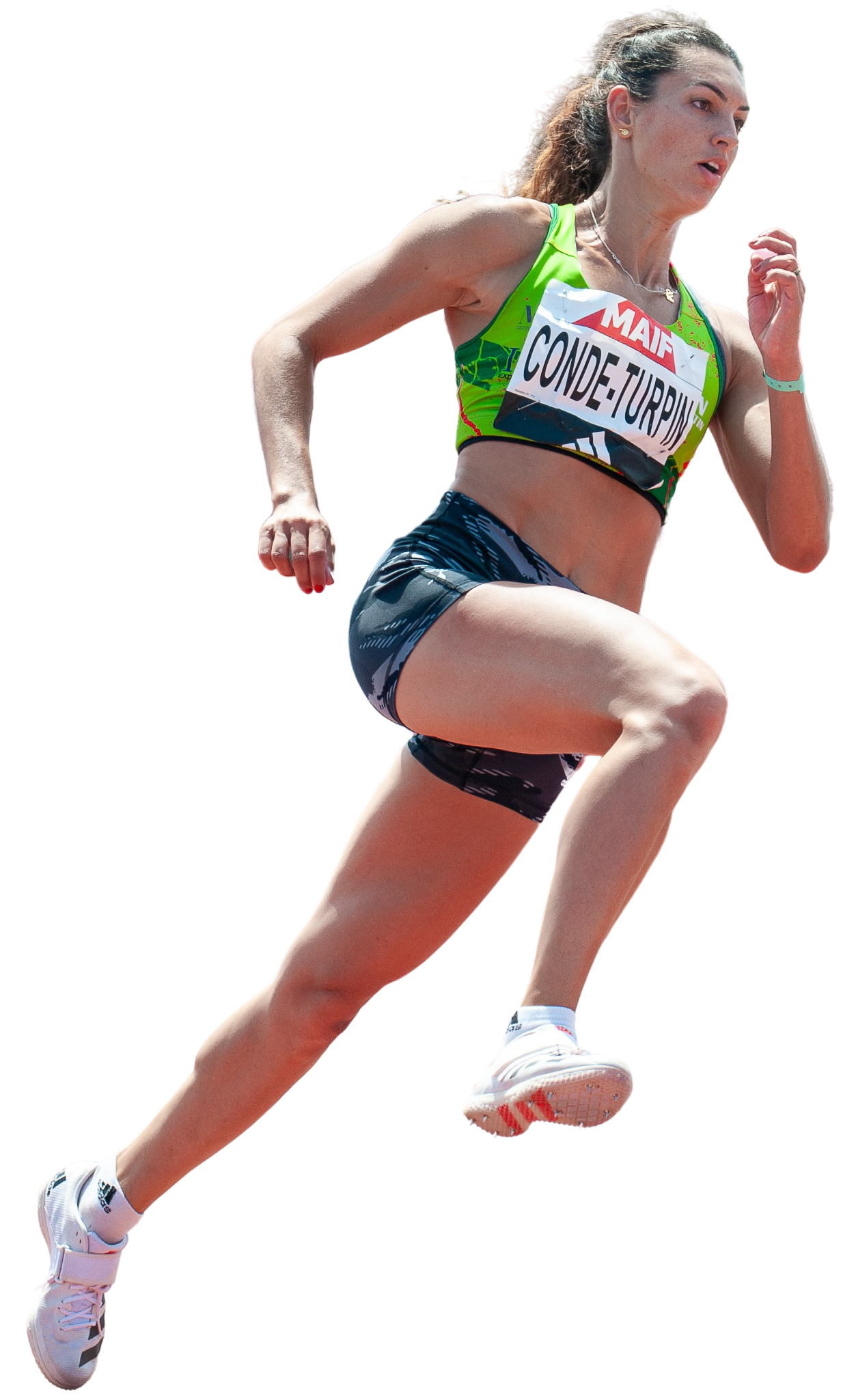
- Esther Condé Turpin in 2023

Personal information
- Born: 29 April 1996 (age 30) Saint-Joseph, Réunion
- Height: 1.75 m (5 ft 9 in)
- Weight: 62 kg (137 lb)

Sport
- Sport: Athletics
- Event: Heptathlon
- Club: Athlé Tarn Nord / Florentin Athlé

Esther Turpin (born 29 April 1996 in Saint-Joseph, Réunion) is a French athlete competing in the combined events.

== Biography ==
Esther Turpin's first club was AC Saint-Joseph (La Réunion France), where her older siblings were already involved in athletics. She turned to combined events, wanting to follow in the footsteps of her older sister, who competed in the heptathlon. In 2018, she was studying psychomotor therapy.

Esther won national titles in 2012, becoming the French cadet heptathlon champion, a title she retained the following year in the same category. She followed the same path in 2014, becoming the French junior heptathlon champion.

Her 2015 was less successful, as she failed to complete her combined events at the French junior championships in Tours (Metropolitan France).

She left for mainland France in September for RC Arras (Metropolitan France), with the goal of moving up a gear, particularly thanks to a higher athlete density than in Réunion Island.

She quickly returned to success and in 2016 she won the French Under-23 heptathlon champion title. This title was extended from the heptathlon to the pentathlon in 2017, to which she also won a silver medal at the French Elite Indoor Championships. Following her strong performances, she received an invitation from the European Federation to compete in the European Indoor Championships in Belgrade. She finished 14th with 4,143 points. That same year, at the European Under-23 Championships, she scored 5,940 points, finishing just off the podium.

Her 2018 season got off to a strong start; on February 17, she became the French Elite Pentathlon Champion in Liévin (Metropolitan France).

She was invited to compete in the highly regarded Götzis meeting (Austria). On this occasion, she improved her heptathlon record by more than 300 points, bringing it to 6,230 points, notably by beating her personal bests in the 100m hurdles, 200m, high jump, long jump, and 800m. At the end of the final event, she was voted the best rookie of the meeting. With this performance, she earned her ticket to the European Championships in Berlin where she finished 12th in the heptathlon, beating her personal best in the high jump with 1.79.

Previously, she won her first French Elite heptathlon title on July 8, 2018, at the Albi (Metropolitan France) with 6,100 points.

At the 2018 Décastar in Talence (Metropolitan France) in September, she finished 8th with 5,898 points.

Her participation as a guest at the Götzis International Meeting (Austria) at the end of May 2022 allowed her to cross the 6,000-point threshold.

She won her second French Elite heptathlon title on June 26, 2021, in Angers (Metropolitan France), with a total of 5,806 points.

She joined the Florentin Athlé club (Metropolitan France 81) in 2021.

This was followed by the 2022 French heptathlon vice-championship with 5,951 points on June 26, 2022, in Caen (Metropolitan France).

Since January 2023, she has been training at Azusa Pacific University in California (USA), where she continues to compete at the highest level.

At the end of July 2023, and for the third time in five years, she was crowned French heptathlon champion in Albi (Metropolitan France) with 6,182 points.

With 4,447 NCAA Division II points in the pentathlon on March 13, she became the 2025 United States champion.

She won her fourth French heptathlon title on August 3, 2025, in Talence (Metropolitan France) with 6,090 points.

== International competitions ==
| Year | Competition | Venue | Position | Event | Notes |
Representing France
| 2013 | World Youth Championships | Donetsk, Ukraine | 9th | Heptathlon (youth) | 5382 pts |
| 2014 | World Junior Championships | Eugene, United States | 17th | Heptathlon | 5282 pts |
| 2017 | European Indoor Championships | Belgrade, Serbia | 14th | Pentathlon | 4143 pts |
| 2017 | European U23 Championships | Bydgoszcz, Poland | 4th | Heptathlon | 5940 pts |
| 2018 | European Championships | Berlin, Germany | 11th | Heptathlon | 6093 pts |
| 2023 | World Championships | Budapest, Hungary | 18th | Heptathlon | 5256 pts |

== Personal bests ==
Outdoor

- 200 metres – 24.53 (+1.8 m/s, Albi 2018)
- 800 metres – 2:12.74 (Albi 2018)
- 100 metres hurdles – 13.19 (+0.6 m/s, Cergy-Pontoise 2018)
- High jump – 1.79 (Berlin 2018)
- Long jump – 6.32 (+1.3 m/s, Götzis 2018)
- Shot put – 13.21 (Götzis 2018)
- Javelin Throw – 46.65 (Berlin 2018)
- Heptathlon – 6230 (Götzis 2018)

Indoor

- 800 metres – 2:17.20 (Lyon 2018)
- 60 metres hurdles – 8.28 (Aubiére 2018)
- High jump – 1.71 (Lyon 2018)
- Long jump – 6.09 (Liévin 2018)
- Shot put – 13.22 (Liévin 2018)
- Pentathlon – 4364 (Liévin 2018)
