= Irina Velihanova =

Turkmenistani track and field athlete

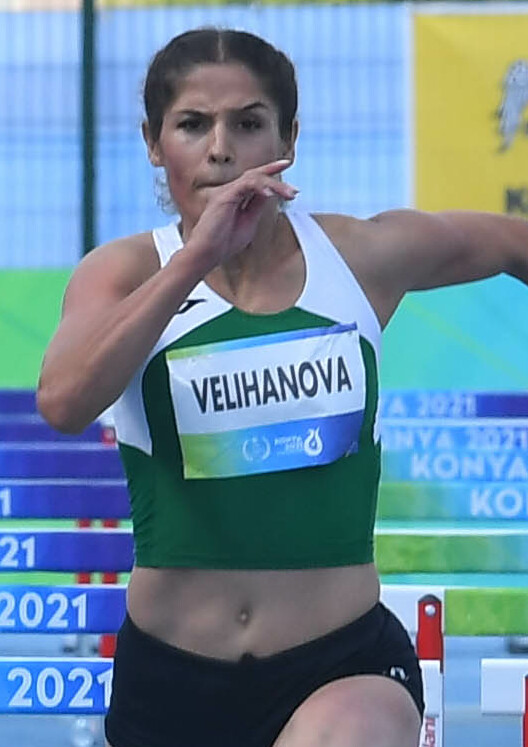

Personal information
- Born: 17 March 1996 (age 30)

Sport
- Country: Turkmenistan
- Sport: Track and field
Medal record
Women's track and field
Representing Turkmenistan
Asian Indoor Athletics Championships
| Bronze medal – third place | 2018 Tehran | Pentathlon |

Irina Velihanova (born 17 March 1996) is a Turkmenistani track and field athlete. In 2019, she competed in the women's 100 metres hurdles event at the 2019 World Athletics Championships held in Doha, Qatar. She did not qualify to compete in the semi-finals.

In 2018, she won the bronze medal in the women's pentathlon event at the 2018 Asian Indoor Athletics Championships held in Tehran, Iran.

In 2019, she competed in the women's heptathlon event at the 2019 Asian Athletics Championships held in Doha, Qatar.
