= List of flag bearers for São Tomé and Príncipe at the Olympics =

São Tomé and Príncipe at the Olympics
- IOC code: STP
- NOC: Comité Olímpico de São Tomé e Príncipe
- Medals: Gold 0 Silver 0 Bronze 0 Total 0

Summer appearances
- 1996; 2000; 2004; 2008; 2012; 2016; 2020; 2024

This is a list of flag bearers who have represented São Tomé and Príncipe at the Olympics.

Flag bearers carry the national flag of their country at the opening ceremony of the Olympic Games.

#	Event year	Season	Flag bearer	Sport
1	1996	Summer	Sortelina Pires	Athletics
2	2000	Summer	Naide Gomes	Athletics
3	2004	Summer	Fumilay Fonseca	Athletics
4	2008	Summer	Celma Bonfim da Graça	Athletics
5	2012	Summer	Lecabela Quaresma	Athletics
6	2016	Summer	Buly Da Conceição Triste	Canoeing
7	2020	Summer	Buly Da Conceição Triste	Canoeing
7	2020	Summer	D'Jamila Tavares	Athletics
8	2024	Summer	Roldeney de Oliveira	Judo
8	2024	Summer	Gorete Semedo	Athletics

== See also ==
- São Tomé and Príncipe at the Olympics
