= São Tomé and Príncipe at the 2020 Summer Olympics =

- IOC code: STP
- NOC: São Tomé and Príncipe Olympic Committee

in Tokyo, Japan July 23, 2021 – August 8, 2021
- Competitors: 3 in 2 sports
- Flag bearers (opening): D'Jamila Tavares; Buly Da Conceição Triste
- Flag bearer (closing): N/A
- Medals: Gold 0 Silver 0 Bronze 0 Total 0

Summer Olympics appearances (overview)
- 1996; 2000; 2004; 2008; 2012; 2016; 2020; 2024

São Tomé and Príncipe competed at the 2020 Summer Olympics in Tokyo, Japan. Originally scheduled to take place from 24 July to 9 August 2020, the Games have been postponed to 23 July to 8 August 2021, because of the COVID-19 pandemic. It was the nation's seventh consecutive appearance at the Summer Olympics.

== Background ==
The São Tomé and Príncipe Olympic Committee was formed in 1979 but was not fully recognised by the International Olympic Committee (IOC) until 1993. São Tomé and Príncipe made their Olympic debut at the 1996 Summer Olympics in Atlanta, Georgia, United States. They established themselves as regular entrants to the Olympics and have not missed a games since their debut. A record delegation of three athletes was sent to both the 2008 Summer Olympics in Beijing, China and the 2016 Summer Olympics in Rio de Janeiro, Brazil. The 2020 Summer Olympics in Tokyo, Japan marked their seventh consecutive appearance at the Olympics.

== Competitors ==
In total, three athletes represented São Tomé and Príncipe at the 2020 Summer Olympics in Tokyo, Japan across two different sports.

Sport	Men	Women	Total
Athletics	0	1	1
Canoeing	2	0	2
Total	2	1	3

== Athletics ==
São Tomé and Príncipe had received a universality slot from the World Athletics to send a female track and field athlete to the Olympics. In total, one São Toméan athlete participated in the athletics events – D'Jamila Tavares in the Women's 800 m.

Track & road events

Athlete	Event	Heat		Semifinal		Final	
Athlete	Event	Result	Rank	Result	Rank	Result	Rank
D'Jamila Tavares	Women's 800 m	2:16.72 PB	8	Did not advance			

== Canoeing ==
São Tomé and Príncipe qualified a single boat for the Games by winning the gold medal at the 2019 African Games in Rabat, Morocco. In total, two São Toméan athletes participated in the canoeing events – Roque Ramos and Buly Triste in the men's C-1 1,000 m and men's C-2 1,000 m.

Athlete	Event	Heats		Quarterfinals		Semifinals		Final	
Athlete	Event	Time	Rank	Time	Rank	Time	Rank	Time	Rank
Roque Ramos	Men's C-1 1,000 m	5:00.977	7 QF	5:10.506	8	Did not advance			
Buly Triste	Men's C-1 1,000 m	4:57.659	6 QF	4:55.527	7	Did not advance			
Roque Ramos; Buly Triste	Men's C-2 1,000 m	4:34.880	7 QF	4:44.055	5 FB	Bye		4:12.075	14

Qualification Legend: FA = Qualify to final (medal); FB = Qualify to final B (non-medal)
