= São Tomé and Príncipe at the 2019 African Games =

- Flag of São Tomé and Príncipe
- IOC code: STP
- NOC: Comité Olímpico de São Tomé e Príncipe

in Rabat, Morocco 19 August 2019 – 31 August 2019
- Competitors: 21 (16 men and 5 women) in 4 sports and 24 events
- Medals Ranked 25th: Gold 1 Silver 1 Bronze 1 Total 3

African Games appearances
- 2003; 2007; 2011; 2015; 2019; 2023

São Tomé and Príncipe competed at the 2019 African Games held from 19 to 31 August 2019 in Rabat, Morocco. In total, athletes representing São Tomé and Príncipe won one gold medal, one silver medal and one bronze medal and the country finished 25th in the medal table. All medals were won in canoeing.

== Medal summary ==
=== Medal table ===
Medal	Name	Sport	Event	Date
Gold	Buly Da Conceição Triste; Roque Fernandes Dos Ramos	Canoeing	Men's C-2 1000 metres	28 August
Silver	Buly Da Conceição Triste	Canoeing	Men's C-1 1000 metres	28 August
Bronze	Buly Da Conceição Triste	Canoeing	Men's C-1 200 metres	30 August

Medals by sport
Sport	1st place, gold medalist(s)	2nd place, silver medalist(s)	3rd place, bronze medalist(s)	Total
Canoeing	1	1	1	3
Total	1	1	1	3

== Athletics ==
In total, five athletes represented São Tomé and Príncipe in athletics.

Gorete Semedo competed in the women's 100 metres event and she reached the semifinals. She was disqualified in the semifinals after a false start. Gorete Semedo also competed in the women's 200 metres event and she finished in 28th place in the heats.

Agate de Sousa competed in the women's 100 metres and she finished in 26th place in the heats; she did not advance to the semifinals. She also competed in the women's long jump event and she finished in 7th place.

Esmaiel Freitas competed in the men's 200 metres event and he finished in 42nd place in the heats. He also competed in the men's 400 metres event where he finished in 41st place in the heats.

Gilberto Leite competed in the men's 800 metres event and he finished in 29th place in the heats.

Dúdú Cruz was scheduled to compete in the men's long jump event but he did not start.

== Canoeing ==
São Tomé and Príncipe competed in canoeing. Buly Da Conceição Triste won one gold medal, one silver medal and one bronze medal.

He won the gold medal in the men's C-2 1000 metres event (together with Roque Fernandes Dos Ramos), the silver medal in the men's C-1 1000 metres event and the bronze medal in the men's C-1 200 metres event. As a result of winning the gold medal in the men's C-2 1000 metres event São Tomé and Príncipe qualified one boat to compete in that event at the 2020 Summer Olympics.

== Chess ==
Four chess players represented São Tomé and Príncipe in chess and they took part in all five events. No medals were won.

== Taekwondo ==
Three athletes competed in Taekwondo.

Athlete	Event	Round of 32	Round of 16	Quarterfinals	Semifinals	Final	
Athlete	Event	Opposition Result	Opposition Result	Opposition Result	Opposition Result	Opposition Result	Rank
Heula Brandão L Dias	Women's –46 kg	—N/a	Soukaina (MAR); L WDR–58	did not advance			
António Da Graça Mendes	Men's –63 kg	—N/a	Moustapha (CHA); L 16–28	did not advance			
Wilson Silva Leal	Men's –87 kg	—N/a	Adoua (CHA); L 8–28	did not advance			
