= São Tomé and Príncipe at the 2012 Summer Olympics =

- IOC code: STP
- NOC: Comité Olímpico de São Tomé e Príncipe

in London
- Competitors: 2 in 1 sport
- Flag bearer: Lecabela Quaresma
- Medals: Gold 0 Silver 0 Bronze 0 Total 0

Summer Olympics appearances (overview)
- 1996; 2000; 2004; 2008; 2012; 2016; 2020; 2024

The African island nation of São Tomé and Príncipe competed at the 2012 Summer Olympics in London, held from 27 July to 12 August 2012. This was the nation's fifth appearance at the Olympics since its debut in 1996. Two track and field athletes, Christopher Lima da Costa and Lecabela Quaresma were selected to the team by wildcard places, without having qualified at any sporting event. Quaresma was selected as flag bearer for the opening and closing ceremonies. Neither of the two athletes progressed beyond the first round of their respective events.

== Background ==
São Tomé and Príncipe participated at five Summer Olympic games from its debut in the 1996 Summer Olympics in Atlanta and its appearance at the 2012 Summer Olympics in London. The highest number of São Tomé and Príncipe athletes participating in a summer games is three in the 2008 games in Beijing, China. No São Tomé and Príncipe athlete has ever won a medal at the Olympics. Two track and field athletes from São Tomé and Príncipe were selected to compete in the London games: Christopher Lima da Costa in the men's 100 m and Lecabela Quaresma in the women's 100 m hurdles.

== Athletics ==
Christopher Lima da Costa was the only male athlete representing São Tomé and Príncipe at the London Olympics. He had not previously competed at any Olympic games. He competed in the men's 100 metres race on August 4, competing against six other athletes in the first heat. He finished the race in 11.56 seconds (his personal best), finishing last of the seven entrants. Kilakone Siphonexay of Laos placed directly ahead of da Costa (11.30 seconds) in a heat led by Bruno Rojas of Bolivia (10.62 seconds). The Santomean athlete placed 73rd of the 75 athletes, and therefore did not advance to later rounds.

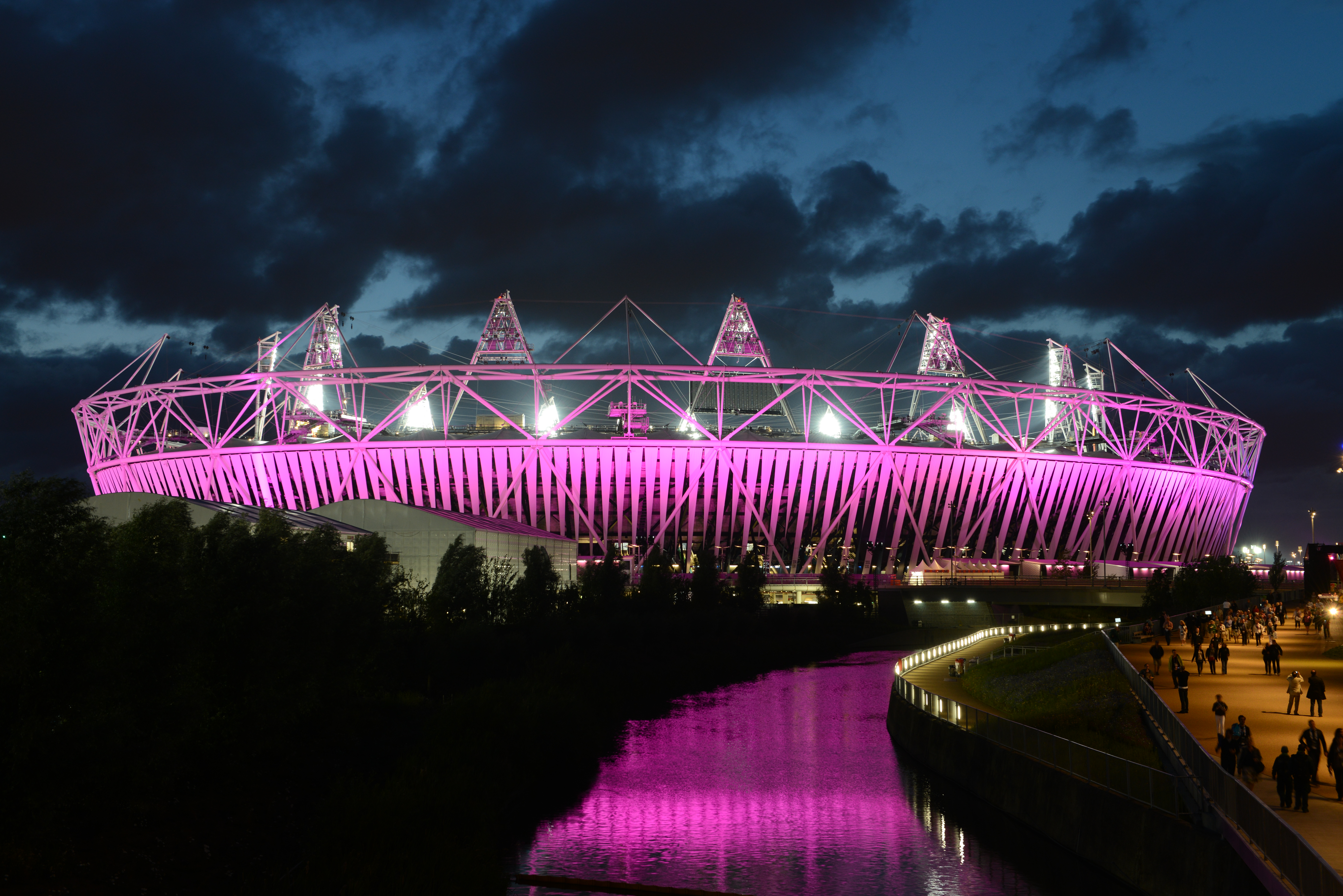
The London Olympic Stadium, where Costa and Quaresma competed in track and field events

Lecabela Quaresma competed on behalf of São Tomé and Príncipe at the London Olympic Games in the women's 100 metre hurdles. Quaresma became affiliated with sports organizations in Portugal and was 22 years old at the time of her competition at the London Olympics. She had not previously competed at any Olympic Games. Quaresma competed against seven other athletes in the second heat on August 6. Quaresma finished the race in 14.54 seconds, finishing last out of the six finishing athletes. (Note: Two athletes, Jessica Ennis and Latoya Greaves did not start.) She ranked behind Anastassiya Pilipenko of Kazakhstan (13.77 seconds) in a heat led by Beate Schrott of Austria (13.09 seconds) and Eline Berings of Belgium (13.46 seconds). Of the 46 finishing athletes, Quaresma placed 42nd and did not advance to later rounds.

Key

- Note–Ranks given for track events are within the athlete's heat only
- Q = Qualified for the next round
- q = Qualified for the next round as a fastest loser or, in field events, by position without achieving the qualifying target
- NR = National record
- N/A = Round not applicable for the event
- Bye = Athlete not required to compete in round

Athlete	Event	Heat		Quarterfinal		Semifinal		Final	
Athlete	Event	Result	Rank	Result	Rank	Result	Rank	Result	Rank
Christopher Lima da Costa	100 m	11.56	7	Did not advance					

Athlete	Event	Heat		Semifinal		Final	
Athlete	Event	Result	Rank	Result	Rank	Result	Rank
Lecabela Quaresma	100 m hurdles	14.54	6	Did not advance			
