= São Tomé and Príncipe at the 1996 Summer Olympics =

- IOC code: STP
- NOC: Comité Olímpico de São Tomé e Príncipe

in Atlanta
- Competitors: 2 in 1 sport
- Flag bearer: Sortelina Pires
- Medals: Gold 0 Silver 0 Bronze 0 Total 0

Summer Olympics appearances (overview)
- 1996; 2000; 2004; 2008; 2012; 2016; 2020; 2024; 2028

São Tomé and Príncipe sent a delegation to compete in the Olympic Games for the first time at the 1996 Summer Olympics in Atlanta, United States from 19 July to 4 August 1996. The delegation consisted of two 100 meters sprinters, Sortelina Pires and Odair Baia. Neither of them were able to advance from their heats.

== Background ==
The Comité Olímpico de São Tomé e Príncipe was recognized by the International Olympic Committee on 31 December 1992. Atlanta marked the island nation's debut in Olympic competition. The 1996 Summer Olympics were held from 19 July to 4 August 1996; 10,318 athletes represented 194 National Olympic Committees. The São Tomé and Príncipe delegation consisted of two sprinters, Sortelina Pires and Odair Baia. Pires was chosen as the flag bearer for the opening ceremony.

== Competitors ==
The following is the list of number of competitors in the Games.

Sport	Men	Women	Total
Athletics	1	1	2
Total	1	1	2

== Athletics ==
Odair Baia was 18 years old at the time of the Atlanta Olympics, and was making his Olympic debut. On 26 July, he took part in the heats of the men's 100 metres; assigned to heat eight, he finished ninth in his heat with a time of 11.05 seconds. Only the top 3 from a heat advanced, and he was eliminated. Sortelina Pires was 19 years old during these Olympics, and was also making her Olympic debut. In the women's 100 metres heats, also held on 26 July, she was part of the third heat. She finished with a time of 13.31 seconds, eighth in her heat in a format where only the top four from each heat, plus the next three fastest overall, were able to advance, meaning she was eliminated.

Athletes	Events	Heat Round 1		Heat Round 2		Semifinal		Final	
Athletes	Events	Time	Rank	Time	Rank	Time	Rank	Time	Rank
Odair Baia	Men's 100 metres	11.05	9	did not advance					
Sortelina Pires	Women's 100 metres	13.31	8	did not advance					

- Note: Ranks are given within an athlete's heat only.
