= São Tomé and Príncipe at the 2016 Summer Olympics =

- IOC code: STP
- NOC: Comité Olímpico de São Tomé e Príncipe

in Rio de Janeiro
- Competitors: 3 in 2 sports
- Flag bearer: Buly Triste
- Medals: Gold 0 Silver 0 Bronze 0 Total 0

Summer Olympics appearances (overview)
- 1996; 2000; 2004; 2008; 2012; 2016; 2020; 2024

São Tomé and Príncipe competed at the 2016 Summer Olympics in Rio de Janeiro, Brazil, from 5 to 21 August 2016. The country's participation at Rio de Janeiro marked its sixth consecutive appearance at the Summer Olympics. Three athletes from São Tomé and Princípe were selected for the Games. Romário Leitão and Celma Bonfim da Graça participated in athletics and Buly Triste in flatwater canoeing. Bonfim was the only female on the roster and the only member with prior Olympic experience (from Beijing 2008). Triste was the first male athlete to carry the São Tomé and Princípe flag at the opening ceremony. São Tomé and Princípe has yet to win its first Olympic medal.

== Background ==
São Tomé and Príncipe participated in six Summer Olympics between its debut in the 1996 Summer Olympics in Atlanta, United States and the 2016 Summer Olympics in Rio de Janeiro, Brazil. The highest number of São Toméans to participate at any single Summer Games was three in the 2008 Summer Olympics in Beijing, China, later equalled in 2016. No São Toméan has ever won a medal at the Summer Olympics. São Tomé and Principe has also never participated at any Winter Olympics.

Both São Toméan participants in athletics qualified for the Games through universality slots while Buly Triste qualified via the 2016 African Sprint Qualifier in Pretoria, South Africa. Triste was chosen to be São Tomé and Princípe's flag bearer during the Parade of Nations of the opening ceremony.

== Athletics ==
São Tomé and Príncipe received universality slots from IAAF to send two athletes (one male and one female) to the Olympics. Romário Leitão made his Olympic debut by competing in the Men's 5000 m event while Celma Bonfim da Graça made her second Olympic appearance, with the first being in Beijing 2008. At the 2008 Olympics, she was one of three athletes to compete for São Tomé and Príncipe. She ran the 5000 metres, finishing 16th (and last) in her heat, still achieving a national record with the time of 17:25.99 minutes with a split time of 2:16.10 minutes behind Lucia Chandamale of Malawi. In these Olympics, Bonfim ran the women's 1500 metres event and finished 14th in her heat with a time of 4:38.86 minutes, failing to qualify for the semifinals. Leitão ran the men's 5000 metres and came 25th in his heat with a time of 15:53.32 minutes. He placed one ahead of Zouhair Aouad who did not finish, and did not qualify for the finals.

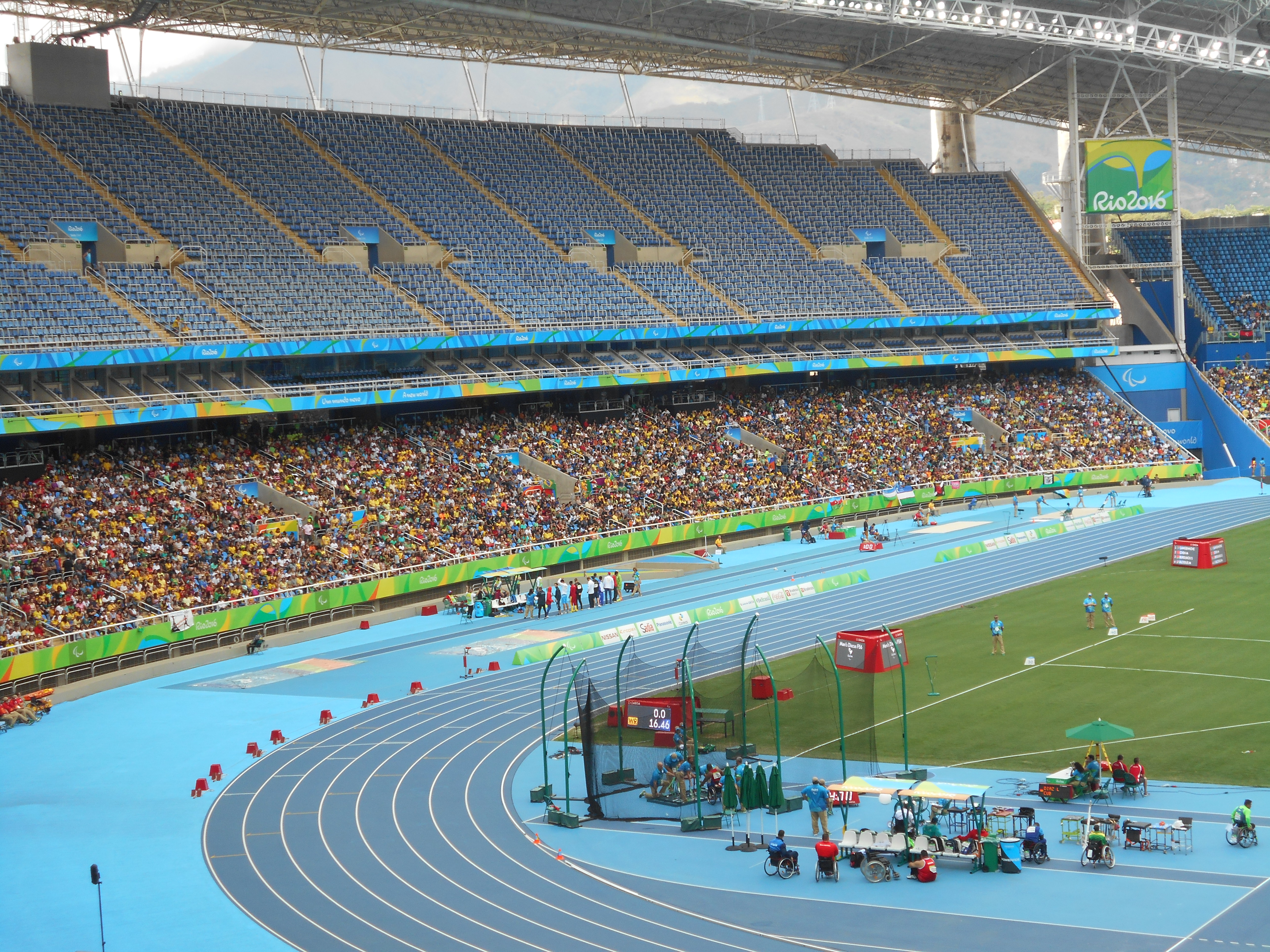
The Olympic Stadium of Rio, also known as Estádio Olímpico Nilton Santos in Portuguese. The venue held the nearly all of the track and field events.

Key

- Note–Ranks given for track events are within the athlete's heat only
- Q = Qualified for the next round
- q = Qualified for the next round as a fastest loser or, in field events, by position without achieving the qualifying target
- NR = National record
- N/A = Round not applicable for the event
- Bye = Athlete not required to compete in round

Track & road events

Athlete	Event	Heat		Semifinal		Final	
Athlete	Event	Time	Rank	Time	Rank	Time	Rank
Romário Leitão	Men's 5000 m	15:53.32	25	—		Did not advance	
Celma Bonfim da Graça	Women's 1500 m	4:38.86	14	Did not advance			

== Canoeing ==
São Tomé and Príncipe qualified one boat in the men's C-1 1000 metres for the Olympics at the 2016 African Championships, signifying the nation's return to the sport after an eight-year hiatus. Buly Triste made his debut in the men's 1000 metres one-man covered canoe event. He came 6th and last in his heat with a time of 4:54.516 minutes. He automatically qualified to the semifinals, but did not reserve a position in any of the finals after coming 7th with a time of 4:46.396 minutes, coming 16 seconds behind Angel Kodinov of Bulgaria.

Athlete	Event	Heats		Semifinals		Final	
Athlete	Event	Time	Rank	Time	Rank	Time	Rank
Buly Triste	Men's C-1 1000 m	4:54.516	6	4:46.396	7	Did not advance	

Qualification Legend: FA = Qualify to final (medal); FB = Qualify to final B (non-medal)
