= São Tomé and Príncipe at the 2008 Summer Olympics =

- IOC code: STP
- NOC: Comité Olímpico de São Tomé e Príncipe

in Beijing
- Competitors: 3 in 2 sports
- Flag bearer: Celma Bonfim da Graça
- Medals: Gold 0 Silver 0 Bronze 0 Total 0

Summer Olympics appearances (overview)
- 1996; 2000; 2004; 2008; 2012; 2016; 2020; 2024; 2028

São Tomé and Príncipe competed at the 2008 Summer Olympics in Beijing, China, from 8–24 August 2008. This marked the country's fourth entry in the Olympics, since its debut in the 1996 Summer Olympics in Atlanta, Georgia, United States. The country's delegation consisted of three competitors, competing in two disciplines: they were athletics competitors Naiel Santiago D'Almeida and Celma Bonfim da Graça, and canoeist Alcino Silva. None of the competitors made it to their event final, though Silva did advance to the semi-finals.

== Background ==
São Tomé and Príncipe participated in every Summer Olympic Games between its debut in the 1996 Summer Olympics in Atlanta and the 2008 Summer Olympics in Beijing. In Beijing, the nation was making its fourth appearance at the Olympics, having never competed in a Winter Olympic Games. With three competitors, this was the most participants ever sent to an Olympics by São Tomé and Príncipe. The country had never won a medal in Olympic competition. Long-distance runner Celma Bonfim da Graça was selected as the flagbearer for the parade of nations at the opening ceremony. An unknown assistant of the National Olympic Committee carried the flag in the closing ceremony.

== Athletics ==
Naiel Santiago D'Almeida was 21 years old at the time of the 2008 Olympics, and competing in his first Olympics. On 18 August 2008, he took part in the heats of the Men's 400 meters race. He was drawn into the 7th and final heat of the race, a race he finished in 49.08 seconds. This was last in his heat, and the second slowest time of all the competitors. As such, he failed to advance to the semi-finals.

Long-distance runner Celma Bonfim da Graça, who was making her Olympic debut, was 30 years old at the time, making her São Tomé and Príncipe's oldest competitor at these Games. At the time, she was the country's oldest Olympian ever, a record she would herself beat at the 2016 Summer Olympics in Rio de Janeiro. On 19 August 2008 she took part in the first heat of the women's 5,000 metres, a heat she finished in 17 minutes and 25.99 seconds. This was in 16th and last place of that race, and she did not qualify for the final.

=== Men ===
Athlete	Event	Heat		Semifinal		Final	
Athlete	Event	Result	Rank	Result	Rank	Result	Rank
Naiel Santiago D'Almeida	400 m	49.08	8	did not advance			

=== Women ===
Athlete	Event	Heat		Final	
Athlete	Event	Result	Rank	Result	Rank
Celma Bonfim da Graça	5000 m	17:25.99 NR	16	did not advance	

- Note–Ranks given for track events are within the athlete's heat only

=== Key ===
- NR = National record

== Canoeing ==
Sprint canoeist Alcino Silva was 17 years old at the time of the competition. On 18 August 2008 he took part in the Men's K-1 1,000 metres, he was drawn into in the second of three heats. He finished the race with a time of 4 minutes and 28.05, ninth and last in his heat. Only the top 7 of each heat were able to advance in the competition. The next day he took part in the heats of the Men's K-1 500 metres competition. He was placed into the third of four heats, and finished his heat in 6th (out of 7 competitors), with a time of 1 minute and 58 seconds. Being in the top 6 of his heat, Alcino advanced to the semi-finals. In the semi-finals, held on 21 August, he was drawn into heat three. This time, only the top three from each semi-final would be allowed to advance to the final. He finished 9th and last in his heat with a time of 2 minutes and 6 seconds, and was eliminated.

=== Key ===
- QS = Qualify to semifinal

Athlete	Event	Heats		Semifinals		Final	
Athlete	Event	Time	Rank	Time	Rank	Time	Rank
Alcino Silva	Men's K-1 500 m	1:58.178	6 QS	2:06.288	9	did not advance	
Alcino Silva	Men's K-1 1000 m	4:28.057	9	did not advance			

- Note–Ranks given are within the athlete's heat only
