= São Tomé and Príncipe at the 2004 Summer Olympics =

- IOC code: STP
- NOC: Comité Olímpico de São Tomé e Príncipe

in Athens
- Competitors: 2 in 1 sport
- Flag bearer: Fumilay Fonseca
- Medals: Gold 0 Silver 0 Bronze 0 Total 0

Summer Olympics appearances (overview)
- 1996; 2000; 2004; 2008; 2012; 2016; 2020; 2024

São Tomé and Príncipe competed at the 2004 Summer Olympics in Athens, Greece, which was held from 13 to 29 August 2004. The country's participation at Athens marked its third appearance in the Summer Olympics since its debut in the 1996 Summer Olympics.

Two track and field athletes, Yazaldes Nascimento and Fumilay Fonseca, were selected to represent the nation via wildcards, as the nation had no athletes that met either the "A" or "B" qualifying standards. Fonseca was selected as flag bearer for the opening ceremony. Fonseca was also notable for becoming the youngest ever athlete to represent São Tomé and Príncipe at the Summer Olympics, aged 16 years and 92 days. This is a record which still stands today.

Nascimento did not progress beyond the heats in the Men's 100 meters, and Fonseca finished last in her event, the 20 kilometers walk. This therefore meant that São Tomé and Príncipe won no medals in this Summer Olympics.

== Background ==
São Tomé and Príncipe participated in three Summer Olympic games between its debut in the 1996 Summer Olympics in Atlanta, United States and the 2004 Summer Olympics in Athens. No São Tomé and Príncipe athlete had ever won a medal at the Summer Olympics before the 2004 Athens Games.

The São Tomé and Príncipe National Olympic Committee (NOC) selected two athletes via wildcards. Usually a NOC would be able to select up to three athletes per event providing that each athlete passed the "A" standard time for that event. If no athletes met the "A" standard, then the NOC would be able to select one athlete for the event, providing that they pass the "B" standard time for the event in question. However, since São Tomé and Príncipe had no athletes that met either standard for any event, they were allowed to select their best two athletes, one of each gender, to represent the nation at the Games. This was to ensure that every nation had a minimum of two representatives in the Summer Olympics. The two athletes that were selected to compete in the Athens games were Yazaldes Nascimento in the Men's 100 meters and Fumilay Fonseca in the Women's 20 kilometers walk. Fonseca was selected as flag bearer for the opening ceremony.

== Athletics ==
Making his Summer Olympics debut, Yazaldes Nascimento qualified for the 2004 Athens Games as a wildcard, without competing in any notable sporting event. He competed on 21 August in Heat 1 against seven other athletes. He ran a time of 11.00 seconds, finishing last of the eight athletes competing. Singapore's Poh Seng Song placed ahead of him with a time of 10.75 seconds, in a heat led by Namibia's Frank Fredericks who posted a time of 10.12 seconds, 0.88 seconds quicker than Nascimento's time. Out of 84 athletes, Nascimento ranked 67th and was 0.65 seconds behind the slowest athlete that progressed to the quarter-finals. Therefore, that was the end of his competition. Competing at her first Summer Olympics, Fumilay Fonseca was notable for carrying the São Tomé and Príncipe flag at the opening ceremony and for becoming the youngest person to represent the nation aged 16 years and 92 days, a record that still stands today. She qualified for the 2004 Athens Games after being granted a wildcard place as she had not competed in any notable sporting event. She competed in the 20 kilometer walk on 23 August against 56 other athletes. She finished last of the 52 that finished with a time of 2 hours, 4 minutes and 54 seconds. Mauritius' Yolene Raffin ranked ahead of her with a time of 1 minute 49.28 seconds. By comparison, the woman who won the gold medal, Greece's Athanasia Tsoumeleka, posted a time of 1 minute and 29.12 seconds, 35.42 seconds faster than Fonseca's time.

Key

- Note–Ranks given for track events are within the athlete's heat only
- Q = Qualified for the next round
- q = Qualified for the next round as a fastest loser or, in field events, by position without achieving the qualifying target
- NR = National record
- N/A = Round not applicable for the event
- Bye = Athlete not required to compete in round

Men

Athlete	Event	Heat		Quarterfinal		Semifinal		Final	
Athlete	Event	Result	Rank	Result	Rank	Result	Rank	Result	Rank
Yazaldes Nascimento	100 m	11.00	8	Did not advance					

Women

Athlete	Event	Final	
Athlete	Event	Result	Rank
Fumilay Fonseca	20 km walk	2:04:54	52
