= Athletics at the 2012 Summer Olympics – Men's 100 metres =

Men's 100 metres at the Games of the XXX Olympiad
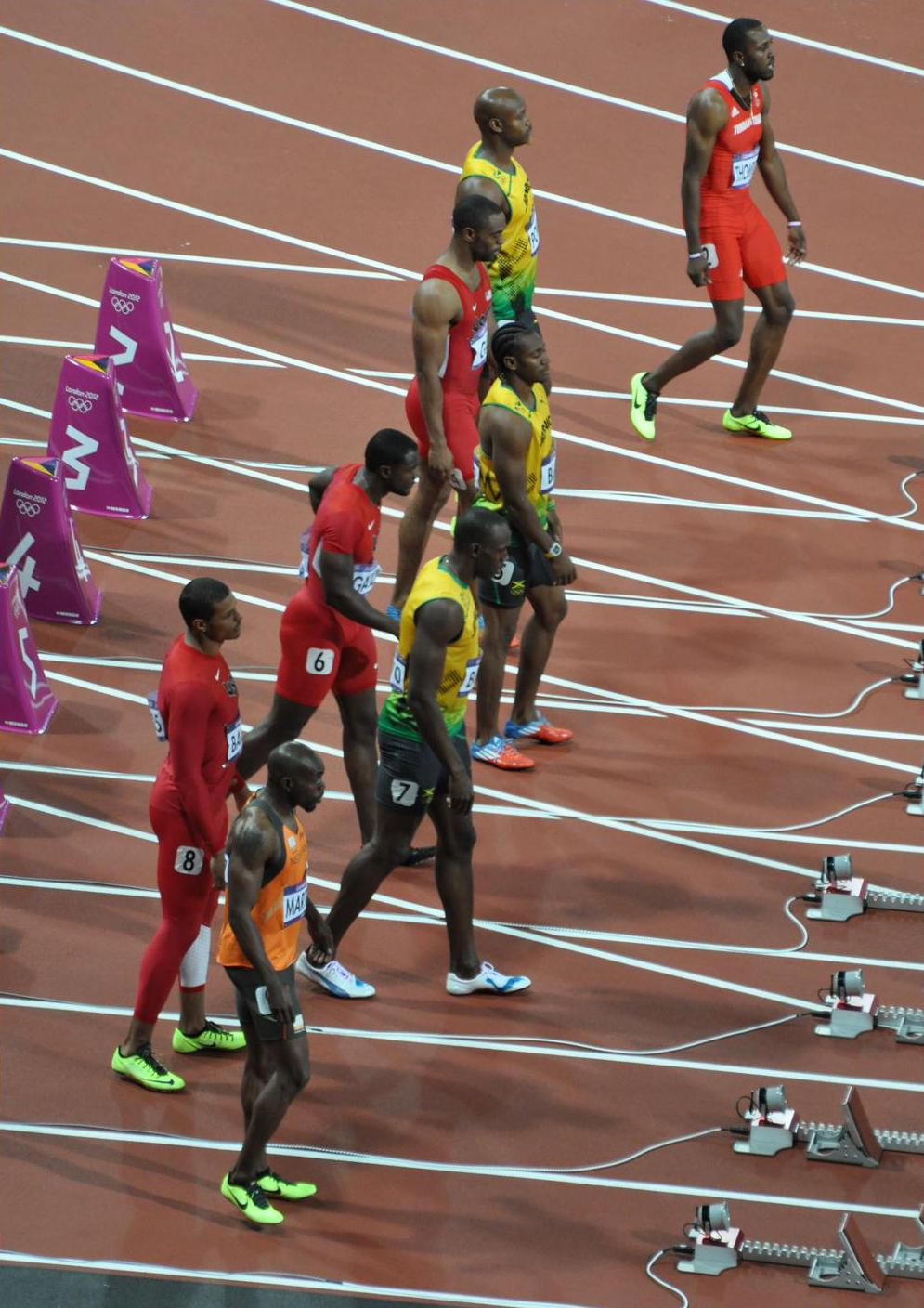
- The finalists awaiting starters orders
- Venue: Olympic Stadium
- Date: 4–5 August 2012
- Competitors: 74 from 61 nations
- Winning time: 9.63 s OR

Medalists
1st place, gold medalist(s)		Usain Bolt	Jamaica
2nd place, silver medalist(s)		Yohan Blake	Jamaica
3rd place, bronze medalist(s)		Justin Gatlin	United States

Official video

The men's 100 metres competition at the 2012 Summer Olympics in London, United Kingdom was held at the Olympic Stadium on 4–5 August 2012. Seventy-four athletes from 61 nations competed. Each nation was limited to 3 athletes per rules in force since the 1930 Olympic Congress. The competition comprised four rounds: a preliminary round for entrants without the minimum qualifying standard, a heats round, followed by three semi-finals of eight athletes each, which then reduced to eight athletes for the final.

== Summary ==
Leading up to this Olympics, defending champion Usain Bolt was the star of the sport, having set world records when winning the 100 metres and 200 metres in the previous Olympics and then improving both world records when winning the 100m and 200m at the 2009 world championships. In the 2011 world championships, the 100 metres was won by Yohan Blake after a false start by Bolt. Later in the season, Blake ran a new 200 metres personal best only .07 behind Bolt's world record. At the 2012 Jamaican Olympic Trials, Blake beat Bolt in both events.

The seven round one heats were won by three Jamaican and three American favorites and Dwain Chambers of Britain. Ryan Bailey was the fastest qualifier with a personal best 9.88.

In the first semi-final, Justin Gatlin ran the fastest semi-final in history 9.82, ahead of Churandy Martina 9.91and former world record holder Asafa Powell in 9.94. Suwaibou Sanneh improved his national record for Gambia at 10.18, set the day before. In the second semi-final, defending champion Usain Bolt ran a relaxed race, finishing in 9.87. Ryan Bailey was second in 9.96. In the third semi-final, Yohan Blake ran 9.85, with Tyson Gay in second at 9.90. The final qualifier was defending silver medalist Richard Thompson with 10.02.

In the final, Bolt, started slow out of the blocks and was behind Blake and Gatlin, but accelerated with 50 meters to go to win the gold medal. He was around five feet (1.5 meters) ahead of the competition at the finish line. Bolt set a new Olympic record (beating his own record set at the 2008 Olympic Games) of 9.64 seconds, later rounded down to 9.63 seconds. Blake edged past Gatlin, who in turn held off a closing Gay at the finish line.

Usain Bolt was the second athlete after Carl Lewis (1984, 1988) to retain the men's 100m championship. His winning time was the second fastest time ever behind his own world record. Yohan Blake finished second in 9.75 seconds. Blake's time was the fastest ever not to win a gold medal. 2004 Olympic champion Justin Gatlin won the bronze medal in 9.79 seconds. The race set a number of records, including: the first time that the top 3 finished under 9.80 seconds; the first time that the top 5 finished in under 9.90 seconds; the first time that the five fastest men in 100m history (Bolt, Gay, Blake, Powell and Gatlin) all competed; and 7 of the 8 men ran in under 10 seconds (Asafa Powell finished in (11.99) after an injury 60 meters into the race). Apart from Powell, each runner's time was the fastest-ever for his respective placing. Blake, Gatlin, Gay, and Bailey all ran times that would have won at least silver in any previous Olympic final. It is considered one of the most outstanding finishes of the men's 100 metres in Olympic history.

== Background ==
This was the twenty-seventh time the event was held, having appeared at every Olympics since the first in 1896. The field was star-studded: 2008 finalists returning were defending gold medalist Usain Bolt of Jamaica, silver medalist Richard Thompson of Trinidad and Tobago, fourth-place finisher Churandy Martina of the Netherlands (Netherlands Antilles in 2008), and fifth-place finisher Asafa Powell of Jamaica (who had now finished fifth twice in a row). The 2004 gold medalist, Justin Gatlin of the United States, returned, along with Tyson Gay and Ryan Bailey. Yohan Blake, the reigning world champion who had beat Bolt at the Jamaican Olympic trials, joined Bolt and Powell for Jamaica.

For the first time ever, no nation made its debut in the event. Lithuania returned for the first time since 1928. The United States made its 26th appearance in the event, most of any country, having missed only the boycotted 1980 Games.

== Qualification ==
A National Olympic Committee (NOC) could enter up to 3 qualified athletes in the men's 100 metres event if all athletes met the A standard, or 1 athlete if they met the B standard. The qualifying time standards could be obtained in various meets during the qualifying period that had the approval of the IAAF. For the sprints and short hurdles, including the 100 metres, only outdoor meets were eligible. The A standard for the 2012 men's 100 metres was 10.18 seconds; the B standard was 10.24 seconds. The qualifying period for was from 1 May 2011 to 8 July 2012. NOCs could also have an athlete enter the 100 metres through a universality place. NOCs could enter one male athlete in an athletics event, regardless of time, if they had no male athletes meeting the qualifying A or B standards in any men's athletic event.

== Competition format ==
The event saw its first significant format change since the introduction of the "fastest loser" system in 1968: the basic four round format introduced in 1920 was changed to a three-round format with preliminaries. The fastest entrants would now have to run only three times, not four. The preliminaries were reserved for the entrants using universality places (that is, not meeting the qualification standards). The changes also expanded the number of semifinals from 2 to 3 (and thus the number of semifinalists from 16 to 24), including using the "fastest loser" system in the semifinals for the first time.

The preliminary round consisted of 4 heats, each with 7 or 8 athletes. The top two runners in each heat advanced, along with the next two fastest runners overall. They joined the faster entrants in the first round of heats, which consisted of 7 heats of 8 athletes each. The top three runners in each heat, along with the next three fastest runners overall, moved on to the semifinals. The 24 semifinalists competed in three heats of 8, with the top two in each semifinal and the next two overall advancing to the eight-man final.

== Records ==
Prior to the competition, the existing World record, Olympic record, and world leading time were as follows:

World record	Usain Bolt (JAM)	9.58 s	Berlin, Germany	16 August 2009
Olympic record	Usain Bolt (JAM)	9.69 s	Beijing, China	16 August 2008
World leading	Yohan Blake (JAM)	9.75 s	Kingston, Jamaica	30 June 2012

The following new Olympic record was set during this competition:

Date	Event	Athlete	Time	Notes
5 August 2012	Final	Usain Bolt (JAM)	9.63 s	OR

The following new National records were set during this competition

Maldives national record	Azneem Ahmed (MDV)	10.79 s
Ivory Coast national record	Ben Youssef Meïté (CIV)	10.06 s
Gambia national record	Suwaibou Sanneh (GAM)	10.18 s
Netherlands national record	Churandy Martina (NED)	9.91 s

== Schedule ==
All times are British Summer Time (UTC+1).

Date	Time	
Saturday, 4 August 2012	10:00; 12:30	Preliminaries; Round 1
Sunday, 5 August 2012	19:45; 21:50	Semifinals; Finals

== Results ==
Official Video of Preliminary Round

=== Preliminaries ===
Qualification rule: The first two finishers in each heat (Q) plus the two fastest times of those who finished third or lower in their heat (q) qualified.

==== Preliminary heat 1 ====
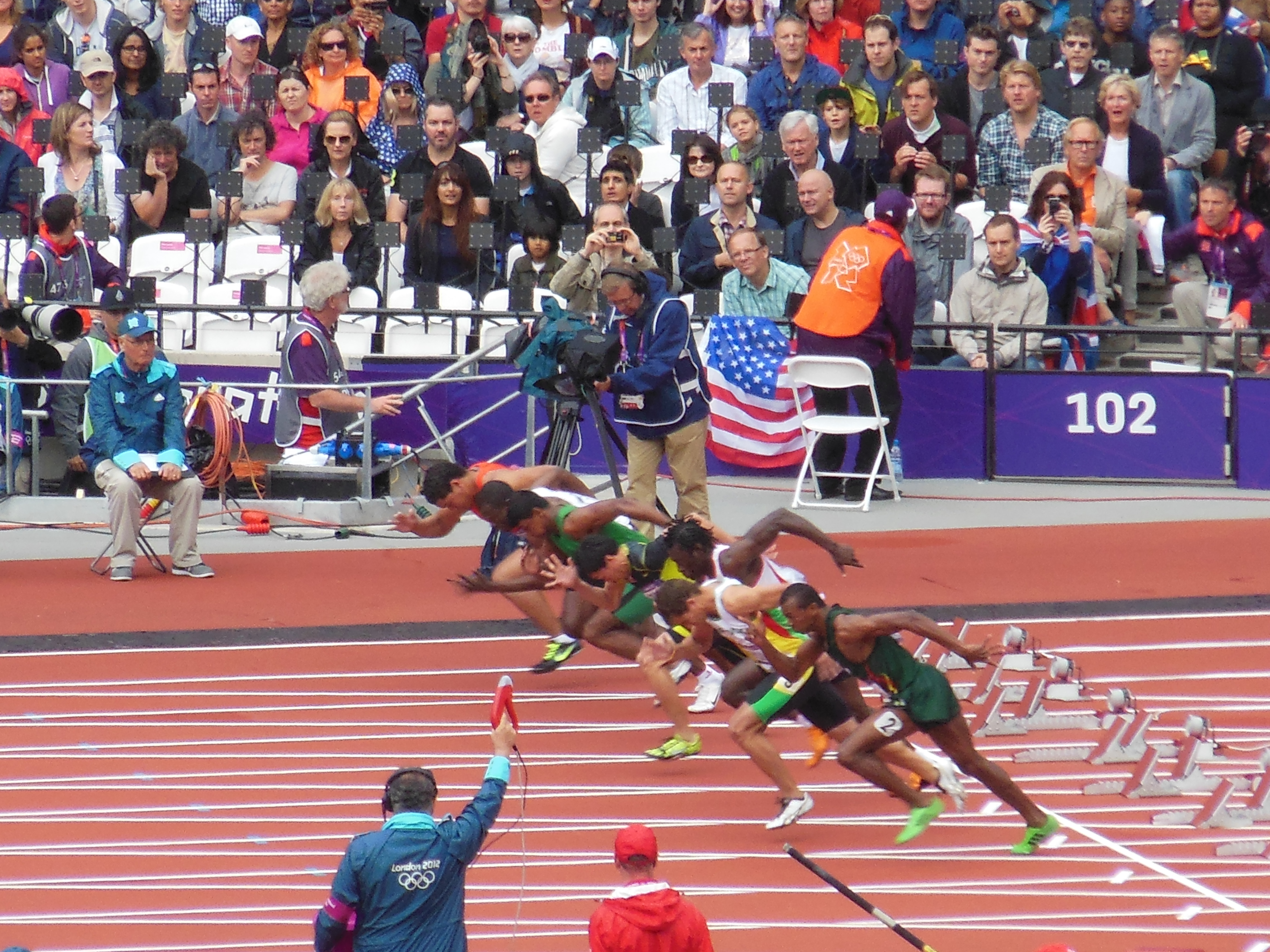
Heat 1

Rank	Lane	Athlete	Nation	Reaction	Time	Notes
1	3	Artur Bruno Rojas	Bolivia	0.162	10.62	Q
2	7	Devilert Arsene Kimbembe	Republic of the Congo	0.143	10.68	Q, SB
3	4	Holder da Silva	Guinea-Bissau	0.168	10.69	q, SB
4	8	Joseph Andy Lui	Tonga	0.184	11.17	
5	6	Mohan Khan	Bangladesh	0.149	11.25	PB
6	5	Kilakone Siphonexay	Laos	0.174	11.30	
7	2	Christopher Lima da Costa	São Tomé and Príncipe	0.195	11.56	PB
				Wind: +0.9 m/s		

==== Preliminary heat 2 ====
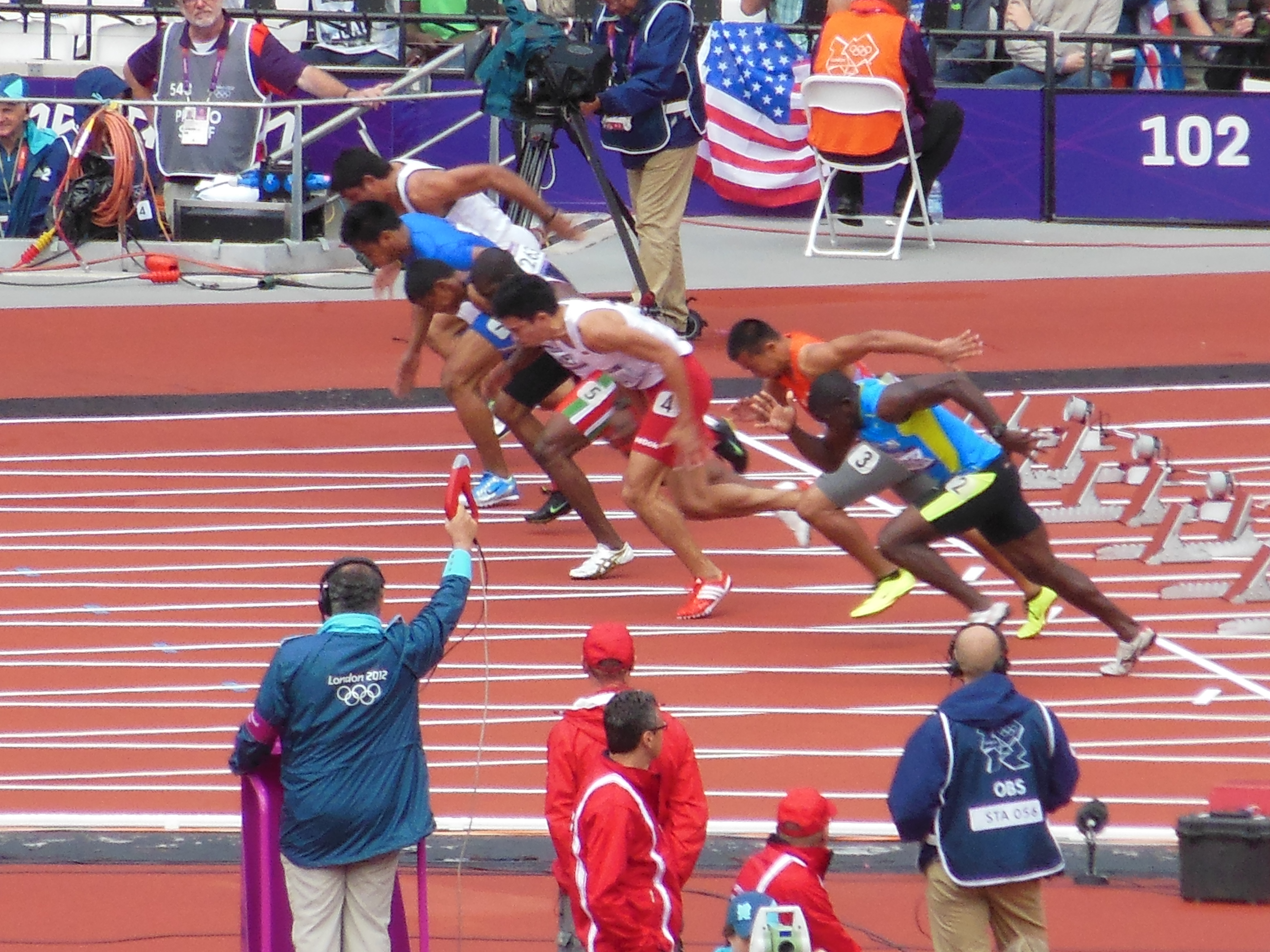
Heat 2

Rank	Lane	Athlete	Nation	Reaction	Time	Notes
1	5	Jurgen Themen	Suriname	0.158	10.55	Q
2	4	Fernando Lumain	Indonesia	0.155	10.80	Q, SB
3	2	Wilfried Bingangoye	Gabon	0.239	10.89	
4	8	Liaquat Ali	Pakistan	0.169	10.90	
5	6	Rodman Teltull	Palau	0.171	11.06	PB
6	7	Tavevele Noa	Tuvalu	0.180	11.55	
7	3	Timi Garstang	Marshall Islands	0.162	12.81	
				Wind: +0.9 m/s		

==== Preliminary heat 3 ====
Rank	Lane	Athlete	Nation	Reaction	Time	Notes
1	6	Béranger Aymard Bosse	Central African Republic	0.162	10.55	Q
2	8	Yeo Foo Ee Gary	Singapore	0.159	10.57	Q, PB
3	4	Azneem Ahmed	Maldives	0.153	10.79	q, NR
4	3	J'maal Alexander	British Virgin Islands	0.163	10.92	
5	5	John Howard	Federated States of Micronesia	0.203	11.05	
6	2	Chris Walasi	Solomon Islands	0.164	11.42	
7	7	Elama Fa’atonu	American Samoa	0.170	11.48	PB
				Wind: +1.7 m/s		

==== Preliminary heat 4 ====
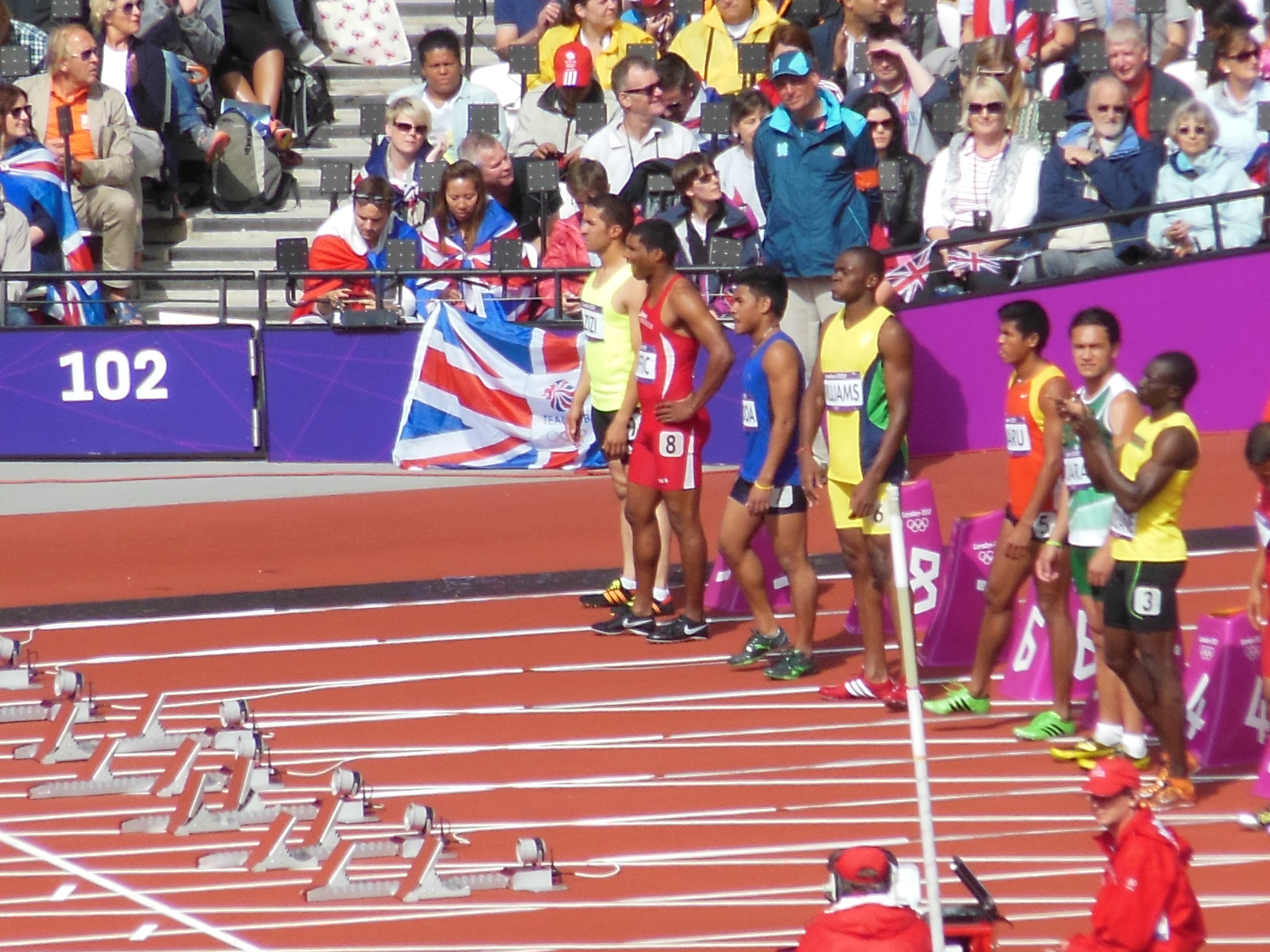
Heat 4

Rank	Lane	Athlete	Nation	Reaction	Time	Notes
1	3	Gérard Kobéané	Burkina Faso	0.194	10.42	Q, SB
2	8	Fabrice Coiffic	Mauritius	0.149	10.62	Q
3	6	Courtney Carl Williams	Saint Vincent and the Grenadines	0.164	10.80	PB
4	2	Rachid Chouhal	Malta	0.160	10.83	SB
5	5	Tilak Ram Tharu	Nepal	0.156	10.85	PB
6	9	Masoud Azizi	Afghanistan	0.167	11.19	
7	7	Nooa Takooa	Kiribati	0.155	11.53	PB
8	4	Patrick Tuara	Cook Islands	0.165	11.72	
				Wind: +0.5 m/s		

Official Video of the Quarterfinal Round

=== Round 1 ===
Qualification rule: The first three finishers in each heat (Q) plus the three fastest times of those who finished fourth or lower in their heat (q) qualified.

==== Heat 1 ====
Rank	Lane	Athlete	Nation	Reaction	Time	Notes
1	6	Tyson Gay	United States	0.147	10.08	Q
2	5	Richard Thompson	Trinidad and Tobago	0.151	10.14	Q
3	7	Gerald Phiri	Zambia	0.147	10.16	Q, SB
4	3	Jaysuma Saidy Ndure	Norway	0.166	10.28	
5	4	Ángel David Rodríguez	Spain	0.168	10.34	
6	2	Jurgen Themen	Suriname	0.169	10.53	
7	5	Isidro Montoya	Colombia	0.165	10.54	
8	1	Yeo Foo Ee Gary	Singapore	0.144	10.69	
				Wind: −1.4 m/s		

==== Heat 2 ====
Rank	Lane	Athlete	Nation	Reaction	Time	Notes
1	4	Justin Gatlin	United States	0.200	9.97	Q
2	6	Derrick Atkins	Bahamas	0.179	10.22	Q
3	5	Rondel Sorrillo	Trinidad and Tobago	0.148	10.23	Q
4	8	Dariusz Kuć	Poland	0.163	10.24	
5	9	Nilson André	Brazil	0.172	10.26	SB
6	7	Masashi Eriguchi	Japan	0.144	10.30	
7	3	Barakat Al-Harthi	Oman	0.152	10.41	
8	2	Fernando Lumain	Indonesia	0.162	10.90	
				Wind: +0.7 m/s		

==== Heat 3 ====
Rank	Lane	Athlete	Nation	Reaction	Time	Notes
1	7	Ryan Bailey	United States	0.177	9.88	Q, =PB
2	8	Ben Youssef Meïté	Ivory Coast	0.174	10.06	Q, NR
3	6	Justyn Warner	Canada	0.149	10.09	Q, PB
4	4	Kemar Hyman	Cayman Islands	0.150	10.16	q
5	9	Suwaibou Sanneh	The Gambia	0.176	10.21	q, NR
6	5	Rytis Sakalauskas	Lithuania	0.178	10.29	
7	3	Béranger Aymard Bosse	Central African Republic	0.170	10.53	
8	2	Artur Bruno Rojas	Bolivia	0.154	10.65	
				Wind: +1.5 m/s		

==== Heat 4 ====
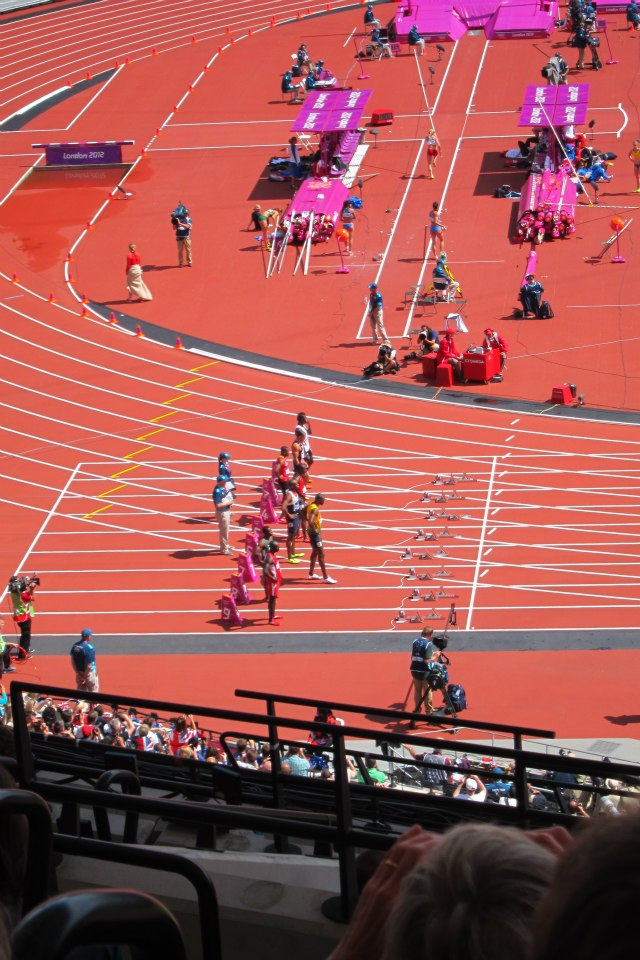
Qualification heat 4

Rank	Lane	Athlete	Nation	Reaction	Time	Notes
1	7	Usain Bolt	Jamaica	0.178	10.09	Q
2	5	Daniel Bailey	Antigua and Barbuda	0.162	10.12	Q
3	6	James Dasaolu	Great Britain	0.174	10.13	Q
4	3	Amr Ibrahim Mostafa Seoud	Egypt	0.164	10.22	
5	4	Jason Rogers	Saint Kitts and Nevis	0.177	10.30	
6	8	Ogho-Oghene Egwero	Nigeria	0.174	10.38	
7	2	Holder da Silva	Guinea-Bissau	0.182	10.71	
–	9	Idrissa Adam	Cameroon	0.206	DNF	
				Wind: +0.4 m/s		

==== Heat 5 ====
Rank	Lane	Athlete	Nation	Reaction	Time	Notes
1	7	Asafa Powell	Jamaica	0.166	10.04	Q
2	4	Adam Gemili	Great Britain	0.156	10.11	Q
3	6	Churandy Martina	Netherlands	0.168	10.20	Q
4	9	Reza Ghasemi	Iran	0.148	10.31	
5	5	Obinna Metu	Nigeria	0.153	10.35	
6	8	Ramon Gittens	Barbados	0.162	10.35	
7	2	Paul Williams	Grenada	0.168	10.65	
8	3	Devilert Arsene Kimbembe	Republic of the Congo	0.157	10.94	
				Wind: 0.0 m/s		

==== Heat 6 ====
Rank	Lane	Athlete	Nation	Reaction	Time	Notes
1	5	Yohan Blake	Jamaica	0.175	10.00	Q
2	7	Ryota Yamagata	Japan	0.149	10.07	Q, PB
3	3	Su Bingtian	China	0.162	10.19	Q, SB
4	6	Antoine Adams	Saint Kitts and Nevis	0.154	10.22	q
5	9	Peter Emelieze	Nigeria	0.153	10.22	SB
6	8	Jeremy Bascom	Guyana	0.135	10.31	
7	4	Marek Niit	Estonia	0.158	10.40	
8	2	Azneem Ahmed	Maldives	0.157	10.84	
				Wind: +1.3 m/s		

==== Heat 7 ====
Rank	Lane	Athlete	Nation	Reaction	Time	Notes
1	9	Dwain Chambers	Great Britain	0.157	10.02	Q, SB
2	6	Jimmy Vicaut	France	0.196	10.11	Q, SB
3	5	Keston Bledman	Trinidad and Tobago	0.195	10.13	Q
4	7	Warren Fraser	Bahamas	0.171	10.27	
5	8	Miguel López	Puerto Rico	0.145	10.31	
6	2	Gérard Kobéané	Burkina Faso	0.186	10.48	
7	3	Fabrice Coiffic	Mauritius	0.165	10.59	
–	4	Kim Collins	Saint Kitts and Nevis	—N/a		DNS
				Wind: +2.0 m/s		

Official Video of the Semifinal Round

=== Semifinals ===
Qualification rule: The first two finishers in each heat (Q) plus the two fastest times of those who finished third or lower in their heat (q) qualified.

==== Semifinal 1 ====
Rank	Lane	Athlete	Nation	Reaction	Time	Notes
1	7	Justin Gatlin	United States	0.187	9.82	Q
2	2	Churandy Martina	Netherlands	0.148	9.91	Q, NR
3	4	Asafa Powell	Jamaica	0.155	9.94	q
4	8	Keston Bledman	Trinidad and Tobago	0.175	10.04	
5	6	Ben Youssef Meïté	Ivory Coast	0.163	10.13	
6	5	Jimmy Vicaut	France	0.203	10.16	
7	9	James Dasaolu	Great Britain	0.174	10.18	
8	3	Suwaibou Sanneh	The Gambia	0.175	10.18	NR
				Wind: +0.7 m/s		

==== Semifinal 2 ====
Rank	Lane	Athlete	Nation	Reaction	Time	Notes
1	4	Usain Bolt	Jamaica	0.180	9.87	Q
2	7	Ryan Bailey	United States	0.155	9.96	Q
3	8	Richard Thompson	Trinidad and Tobago	0.158	10.02	q
4	5	Dwain Chambers	Great Britain	0.154	10.05	
5	9	Gerald Phiri	Zambia	0.165	10.11	SB
6	6	Daniel Bailey	Antigua and Barbuda	0.142	10.16	
7	2	Antoine Adams	Saint Kitts and Nevis	0.159	10.27	
8	3	Su Bingtian	China	0.157	10.28	
				Wind: +1.0 m/s		

==== Semifinal 3 ====
Rank	Lane	Athlete	Nation	Reaction	Time	Notes
1	6	Yohan Blake	Jamaica	0.176	9.85	Q
2	4	Tyson Gay	United States	0.151	9.90	Q
3	7	Adam Gemili	Great Britain	0.158	10.06	
4	8	Derrick Atkins	Bahamas	0.164	10.08	SB
5	9	Justyn Warner	Canada	0.135	10.09	=PB
6	5	Ryota Yamagata	Japan	0.158	10.10	
7	3	Rondel Sorrillo	Trinidad and Tobago	0.140	10.31	
–	2	Kemar Hyman	Cayman Islands	—N/a		DNS
				Wind: +1.7 m/s		

=== Final ===
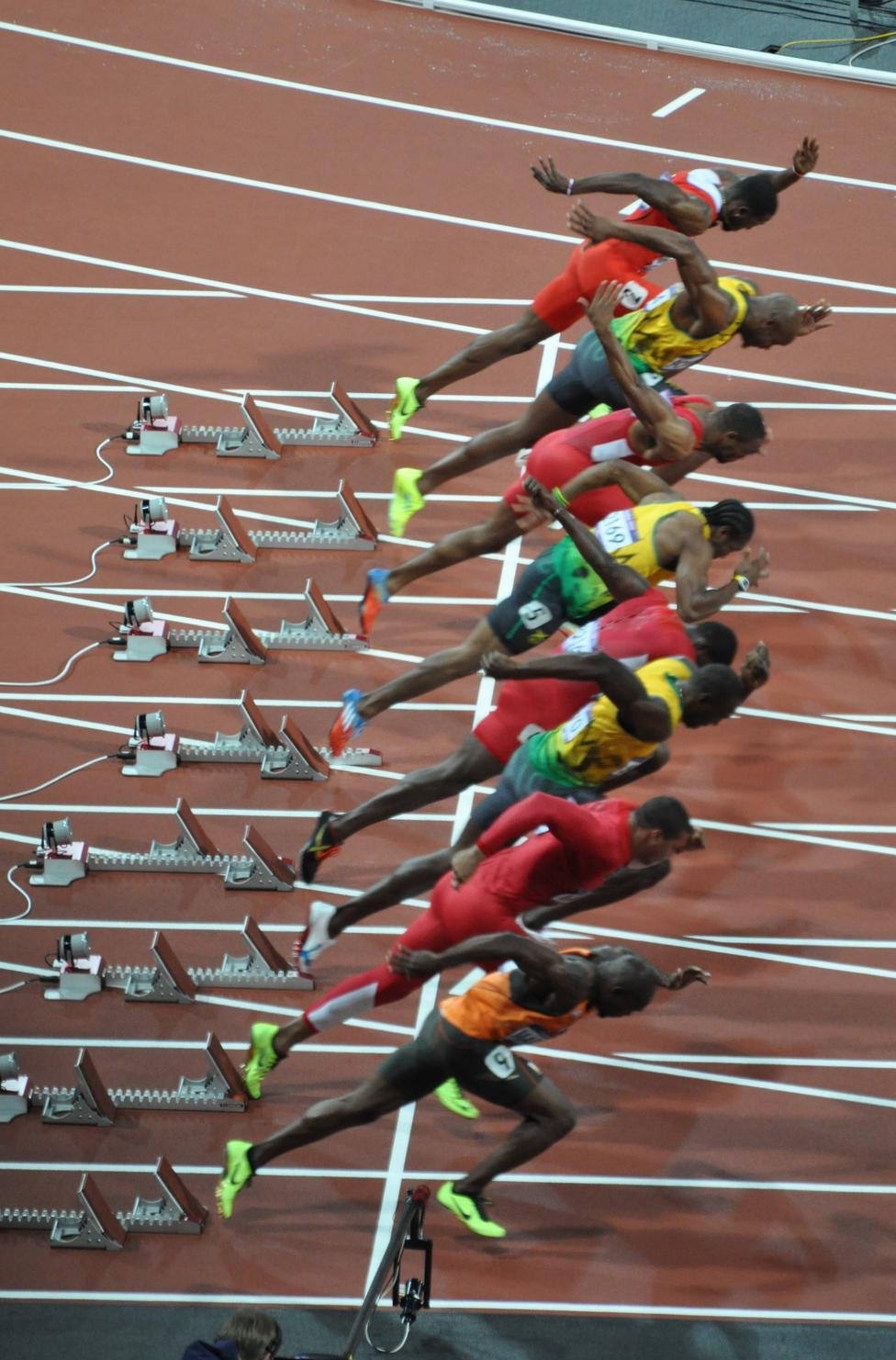
Start of the final; lane 9 is closest.

Rank	Lane	Athlete	Nation	Reaction	Time	Notes
1st place, gold medalist(s)	7	Usain Bolt	Jamaica	0.165	9.63	OR
2nd place, silver medalist(s)	5	Yohan Blake	Jamaica	0.179	9.75	=PB
3rd place, bronze medalist(s)	6	Justin Gatlin	United States	0.178	9.79	PB
4	8	Ryan Bailey	United States	0.176	9.88	=PB
5	9	Churandy Martina	Netherlands	0.139	9.94	
6	2	Richard Thompson	Trinidad and Tobago	0.160	9.98	
7	3	Asafa Powell	Jamaica	0.155	11.99	
–	4	Tyson Gay	United States	0.145	~~9.80~~	DQ
				Wind: +1.5 m/s		

== Incident ==
Just before the start of the final, a spectator threw a plastic beer bottle at the competitors in the starting blocks. Though the race was unaffected, he was arrested. The man, later identified as Ashley Gill-Webb, happened to be sitting next to Dutch judoka and bronze medalist Edith Bosch, who promptly struck him with her hand on the back of his head after the toss. LOCOG Chairman Sebastian Coe later stated: "I'm not suggesting vigilantism but it was actually poetic justice that they happened to be sitting next to a judo player". Gill-Webb later pleaded not guilty to a charge of using threatening words or behaviour with intent to cause harassment, alarm or distress at Stratford Magistrates' Court. In January 2013, he was found guilty and later sentenced to an eight-week community order and a £1,500 fine.
