= São Tomé and Príncipe at the 2024 Summer Olympics =

- IOC code: STP
- NOC: Comité Olímpico de São Tomé e Príncipe

in Paris, France 26 July 2024 – 11 August 2024
- Competitors: 3 (1 man and 2 women) in 3 sports
- Flag bearers: Roldeney de Oliveira and Gorete Semedo
- Medals: Gold 0 Silver 0 Bronze 0 Total 0

Summer Olympics appearances (overview)
- 1996; 2000; 2004; 2008; 2012; 2016; 2020; 2024

São Tomé and Príncipe competed at the 2024 Summer Olympics in Paris from 26 July to 11 August 2024. It was the nation's eighth Summer Olympics appearance since its official debut at the 1996 Summer Olympics in Atlanta. Three athletes from São Tomé and Princípe were selected for the Games. Gorete Semedo in athletics, Hermínia Teixeira in canoeing, and Roldeney de Oliveira in judo.

== Competitors ==
The following is the list of number of competitors in the Games.

| Sport | Men | Women | Total |
|---|---|---|---|
| Athletics | 0 | 1 | 1 |
| Canoeing | 0 | 1 | 1 |
| Judo | 1 | 0 | 1 |
| Total | 1 | 2 | 3 |

== Athletics ==
São Tomé and Príncipe sent one sprinter to compete at the 2024 Summer Olympics.

Key

- Note–Ranks given for track events are within the athlete's heat only
- Q = Qualified for the next round
- q = Qualified for the next round as a fastest loser or, in field events, by position without achieving the qualifying target
- NR = National record
- N/A = Round not applicable for the event
- Bye = Athlete not required to compete in round

Track events
| Athlete | Event | Preliminary | | Heat | | Semifinal | | Final | |
| Athlete | Event | Result | Rank | Result | Rank | Result | Rank | Result | Rank |
|---|---|---|---|---|---|---|---|---|---|
| Gorete Semedo | Women's 100 m | 11.44 | 1 Q | 11.43 | 6 | Did Not Advance | | | |

== Canoeing ==
São Tomé and Príncipe qualified one canoeist for the Games through the allocations of universality places.

| Athlete | Event | Heats | | Quarterfinals | | Semifinals | | Final | |
| Athlete | Event | Time | Rank | Time | Rank | Time | Rank | Time | Rank |
|---|---|---|---|---|---|---|---|---|---|
| Hermínia Teixeira | Women's C-1 200 m | 59.44 | 6 | 1:00.28 | 8 | Did not advance | | | |

Qualification Legend: FA = Qualify to final (medal); FB = Qualify to final B (non-medal)

== Judo ==
São Tomé and Príncipe sent one judoka to the Games, with qualification achieved through the allocations of universality places. 2024 also marked the nation's debut in judo.

| Athlete | Event | Round of 32 | Round of 16 | Quarterfinals | Semifinals | Repechage | Final / BM | |
| Athlete | Event | Opposition Result | Opposition Result | Opposition Result | Opposition Result | Opposition Result | Opposition Result | Rank |
|---|---|---|---|---|---|---|---|---|
| Roldeney de Oliveira | Men's –73 kg | Wandtke (GER); L 10–00 | Did not advance | | | | | |
