= Michele Zerial =

Italian canoeist (born 1987)

Michele Zerial (born 9 March 1987 in Trieste) is an Italian sprint canoeist who competed in the late 2000s. At the 2008 Summer Olympics in Beijing, he was eliminated in the semifinals of the K-1 500 m event.
