= São Tomé and Príncipe at the Olympics =

- IOC code: STP
- NOC: Comité Olímpico de São Tomé e Príncipe
- Medals: Gold 0 Silver 0 Bronze 0 Total 0

Summer appearances
- 1996; 2000; 2004; 2008; 2012; 2016; 2020; 2024

São Tomé and Príncipe has competed in 8 Summer Olympic Games since its debut in 1996. The nation has never competed in the Winter Olympic Games and has never won any medals at the Games of the Olympiad.

The National Olympic Committee for São Tomé and Príncipe was formed in 1979. The International Olympic Committee recognized them in 1993.

== Medal tables ==
=== Medals by Games ===
Games	Athletes	Gold	Silver	Bronze	Total	Rank
1996 Atlanta	2	0	0	0	0	–
2000 Sydney	2	0	0	0	0	–
2004 Athens	2	0	0	0	0	–
2008 Beijing	3	0	0	0	0	–
2012 London	2	0	0	0	0	–
2016 Rio de Janeiro	3	0	0	0	0	–
2020 Tokyo	3	0	0	0	0	–
2024 Paris	3	0	0	0	0	–
2028 Los Angeles	future event					
2032 Brisbane	future event					
Total		0	0	0	0	–

== See also ==
- List of flag bearers for São Tomé and Príncipe at the Olympics
- List of participating nations at the Summer Olympic Games
- List of participating nations at the Winter Olympic Games
