= São Tomé and Príncipe at the 2000 Summer Olympics =

- IOC code: STP
- NOC: Comité Olímpico de São Tomé e Príncipe

in Sydney
- Competitors: 2 in 1 sport
- Flag bearer: Naide Gomes
- Medals: Gold 0 Silver 0 Bronze 0 Total 0

Summer Olympics appearances (overview)
- 1996; 2000; 2004; 2008; 2012; 2016; 2020; 2024

São Tomé and Príncipe competed at the 2000 Summer Olympics in Sydney, Australia, which took place from 15 September to 1 October 2000. This marked the country's second appearance at the Summer Olympics, following its debut at the 1996 Summer Olympics. Its delegation consisted of two track and field athletes, Arlindo Pinheiro and Naide Gomes, who were selected to represent the country via wildcards, as the country had no athletes that met either the "A" or "B" qualifying standards. Pinheiro competed in the men's 110 m hurdles and Gomes competing in the women's 100 m hurdles, respectively. Gomes was selected as the flag bearer for the opening ceremony. Despite Pinheiro setting a national record with his time, ultimately, neither athlete progressed beyond the heats of their respective events.

== Background ==
São Tomé and Príncipe participated in two Summer Olympic games between its debut in the 1996 Summer Olympics in Atlanta, United States and the 2000 Summer Olympics. No São Tomé and Príncipe athlete had ever won a medal at the Summer Olympics prior to the Sydney Games.

The São Tomé and Príncipe National Olympic Committee (NOC) selected two athletes via wildcards. Usually a NOC would be able to select up to three athletes per event providing that each athlete passed the "A" standard time for that event. However, since São Tomé and Príncipe had no athletes that met either standard for any event, they were allowed to select their best two athletes, one of each gender, to represent the nation at the Games.

== Competitors ==
The following is the list of number of competitors in the Games.

Sport	Men	Women	Total
Athletics	1	1	2
Total	1	1	2

== Athletics ==
Arlindo Pinheiro was 29 years old at the time of his Olympic debut in Sydney. He competed in the heats of the men's 100 metres on 24 September. He was assigned to heat six and finished sixth with a time of 15.65 seconds, a national record for his country. Nonetheless, only the top three from a heat advanced, so he was eliminated.

=== Men ===
Athletes	Events	Heat Round 1		Heat Round 2		Semifinal		Final	
Athletes	Events	Time	Rank	Time	Rank	Time	Rank	Time	Rank
Arlindo Pinheiro	110 m hurdles	15.65 (NR)	6	Did not advance					

=== Women ===
Athletes	Events	Heat Round 1		Heat Round 2		Semifinal		Final	
Athletes	Events	Time	Rank	Time	Rank	Time	Rank	Time	Rank
Naide Gomes	100 m hurdles	14.43	8	Did not advance					

== Sources ==
- Wallechinsky, David (2004). The Complete Book of the Summer Olympics (Athens 2004 Edition). Toronto, Canada. ISBN 1-894963-32-6.
- International Olympic Committee (2001). The Results. Retrieved 12 November 2005.
- Sydney Organising Committee for the Olympic Games (2001). Official Report of the XXVII Olympiad Volume 1: Preparing for the Games. Retrieved 20 November 2005.
- Sydney Organising Committee for the Olympic Games (2001). Official Report of the XXVII Olympiad Volume 2: Celebrating the Games. Retrieved 20 November 2005.
- Sydney Organising Committee for the Olympic Games (2001). The Results. Retrieved 20 November 2005.
- International Olympic Committee Web Site
