= Canoeing at the 2008 Summer Olympics – Men's K-1 500 metres =

The men's K-1 500 metres competition in canoeing at the 2008 Summer Olympics took place at the Shunyi Olympic Rowing-Canoeing Park in Beijing. The K-1 event is raced in single-person kayaks. This would be the last time the event would take place at the Summer Olympics. On 13 August 2009, it was announced by the International Canoe Federation that the men's 500 m events would be replaced by 200 m events at the 2012 Summer Olympics with one of them being K-1 200 m for the women. The other events for men at 200 m will be C-1, C-2, and K-1.

Competition consists of three rounds: the heats, the semifinals, and the final. All boats compete in the heats. The top six finishers in each of the four heats advances directly to the semifinal along with the top three times. The top three finishers in each of the three semifinals advance to the final.

Heats took place on August 19, semifinal on August 21, and final on August 23.

== Schedule ==
All times are China Standard Time (UTC+8)

Date	Time	Round
Tuesday, August 19, 2008	15:30-16:10	Heats
Thursday, August 21, 2008	15:30-16:00	Semifinals
Saturday, August 23, 2008	15:30-15:45	Final

== Medalists ==
Gold	Silver	Bronze
Ken Wallace (AUS)	Adam van Koeverden (CAN)	Tim Brabants (GBR)

== Results ==
=== Heats ===
Qualification Rules: 1..6->Semifinals + 3 best next by time, Rest Out

==== Heat 1 ====
Rank	Athletes	Country	Time	Notes
1	Adam van Koeverden	Canada	1:35.554 WB	QS
2	Eirik Verås Larsen	Norway	1:36.439	QS
3	Michele Zerial	Italy	1:36.950	QS
4	Steven Ferguson	New Zealand	1:37.538	QS
5	Shaun Rubenstein	South Africa	1:37.687	QS
6	Dmitriy Torlopov	Kazakhstan	1:39.892	QS
7	Jorge Garcia	Cuba	1:42.803	QS
8	Rudolph Berking-Williams	Samoa	1:47.839	QS

==== Heat 2 ====
Rank	Athletes	Country	Time	Notes
1	Tim Brabants	Great Britain	1:36.338	QS
2	Anton Ryakhov	Russia	1:37.666	QS
3	Stjepan Janić	Croatia	1:37.724	QS
4	Arnaud Hybois	France	1:37.902	QS
5	Miguel Correa	Argentina	1:39.781	QS
6	Emanuel Silva	Portugal	1:42.513	QS
7	Tony Lespoir	Seychelles	1:53.248	

==== Heat 3 ====
Rank	Athletes	Country	Time	Notes
1	Ákos Vereckei	Hungary	1:36.099	QS
2	Ken Wallace	Australia	1:36.208	QS
3	Anders Gustafsson	Sweden	1:36.633	QS
4	Marek Twardowski	Poland	1:39.436	QS
5	Assane Dame Fall	Senegal	1:52.215	QS
6	Alcino Silva	São Tomé and Príncipe	1:58.178	QS
7	Kotoua Francis Abia	Ivory Coast	2:00.716	

==== Heat 4 ====
Rank	Athletes	Country	Time	Notes
1	Michael Kolganov	Israel	1:38.396	QS
2	Jonas Ems	Germany	1:38.819	QS
3	Rami Zur	United States	1:39.037	QS
4	Manuel Cortina Martínez	Mexico	1:40.626	QS
5	Kasper Bleibach	Denmark	1:42.529	QS
6	Pan Yao	China	1:44.757	QS
7	Myint Tayzar Phone	Myanmar	1:48.179	QS

=== Semifinals ===
Qualification Rules: 1..3->Final, Rest Out

==== Semifinal 1 ====
Rank	Athletes	Country	Time	Notes
1	Adam van Koeverden	Canada	1:42.438	QF
2	Anton Ryakhov	Russia	1:42.968	QF
3	Ken Wallace	Australia	1:43.340	QF
4	Shaun Rubenstein	South Africa	1:44.154	
5	Emanuel Silva	Portugal	1:45.985	
6	Rami Zur	United States	1:47.163	
7	Manuel Cortina Martínez	Mexico	1:48.333	
8	Jorge Garcia	Cuba	1:49.077	
9	Assane Dame Fall	Senegal	2:04.633	

==== Semifinal 2 ====
Rank	Athletes	Country	Time	Notes
1	Steven Ferguson	New Zealand	1:42.238	QF
2	Anders Gustafsson	Sweden	1:42.409	QF
3	Tim Brabants	Great Britain	1:42.530	QF
4	Michele Zerial	Italy	1:42.931	
5	Marek Twardowski	Poland	1:43.733	
6	Jonas Ems	Germany	1:44.717	
7	Miguel Correa	Argentina	1:46.422	
8	Pan Yao	China	1:55.242	
—	Rudolph Berking-Williams	Samoa	—	DNS

==== Semifinal 3 ====
Rank	Athletes	Country	Time	Notes
1	Stjepan Janić	Croatia	1:41.689	QF
2	Eirik Verås Larsen	Norway	1:41.927	QF
3	Ákos Vereckei	Hungary	1:42.155	QF
4	Michael Kolganov	Israel	1:43.145	
5	Arnaud Hybois	France	1:43.559	
6	Kasper Bleibach	Denmark	1:45.418	
7	Dmitriy Torlopov	Kazakhstan	1:47.573	
8	Myint Tayzar Phone	Myanmar	1:55.300	
9	Alcino Silva	São Tomé and Príncipe	2:06.288	

=== Final ===
Rank	Athletes	Country	Time	Notes
Gold medal	Ken Wallace	Australia	1:37.252	
Silver medal	Adam van Koeverden	Canada	1:37.630	
Bronze medal	Tim Brabants	Great Britain	1:37.671	
4	Eirik Verås Larsen	Norway	1:37.949	
5	Anton Ryakhov	Russia	1:38.187	
6	Ákos Vereckei	Hungary	1:38.318	
7	Anders Gustafsson	Sweden	1:38.447	
8	Steven Ferguson	New Zealand	1:38.512	
9	Stjepan Janić	Croatia	1:38.729	
