= João de Barros (athlete) =

São Tomé and Príncipe sprinter

Personal information
- Born: 25 May 1993 (age 33)

Sport
- Country: São Tomé and Príncipe
- Sport: Track and field
- Event: sprinter
- Updated on 29 August 2015

João de Barros (born 25 May 1993) is a male São Tomé and Príncipe sprinter. He competed in the 100 metres event at the 2015 World Championships in Athletics in Beijing, China.

== See also ==
- São Tomé and Príncipe at the 2015 World Championships in Athletics
