= Mohan Khan =

Bangladeshi sprinter

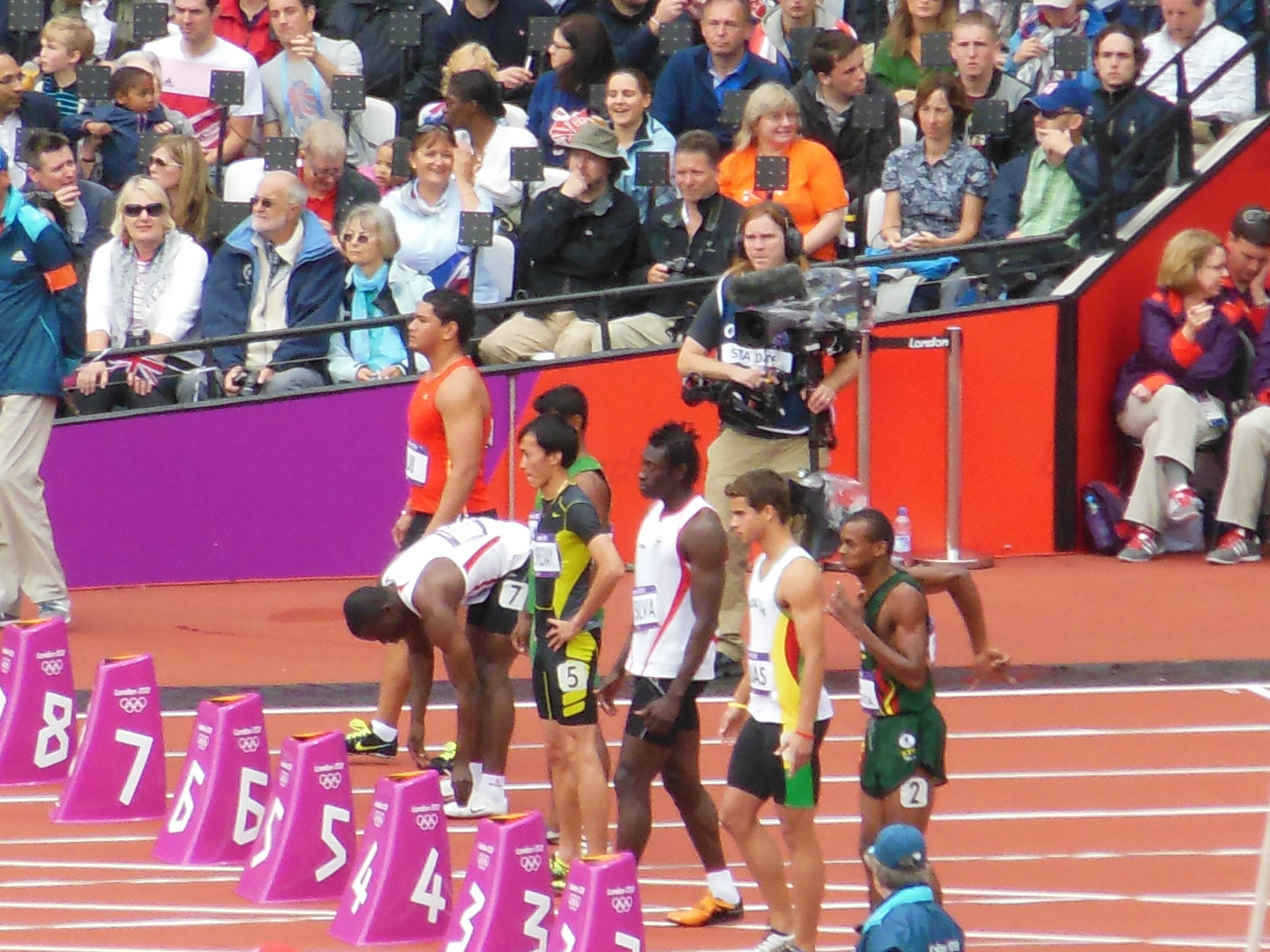
- Before the start of heat 1 of the 100 m at the 2012 Summer Olympics

Personal information
- Born: September 6, 1991 (age 34)

Sport
- Country: Bangladesh
- Sport: Athletics
- Event: 100 metres

Achievements and titles
- Personal best: 11.25 (2012)
- Updated on 15 August 2012

Mohan Kan (Bengali: মোহন খান; born September 6, 1991) is a sprinter from Bangladesh. He came 5th in Heat 1 of the 100 metres Preliminaries at the 2012 Summer Olympics and did not advance to the first round but did set a personal best time of 11.25 seconds.
