= Patrick Tuara =

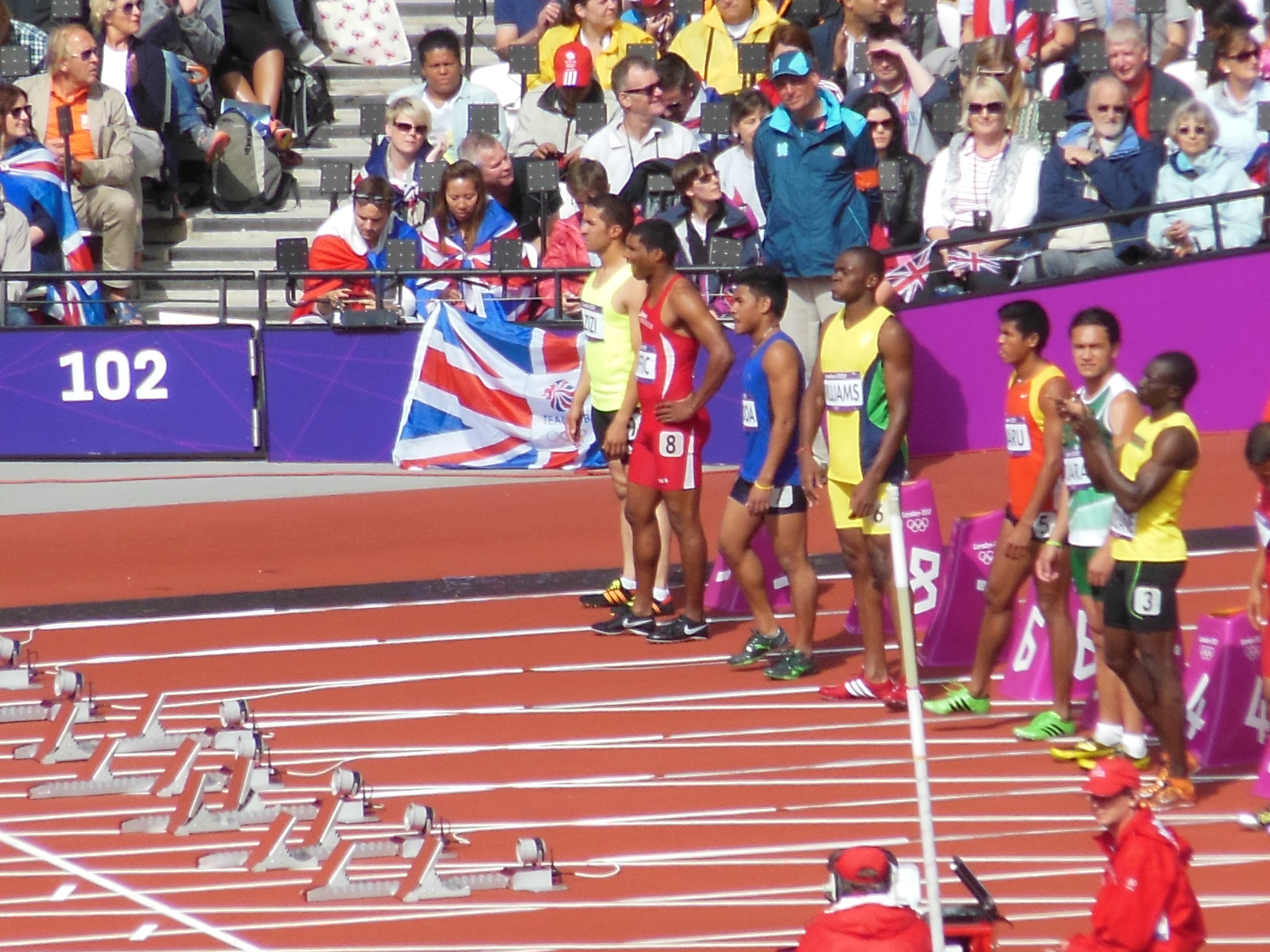
- Before the start of heat 4 of the 100 m at the 2012 Summer Olympics

Personal information
- Born: 23 March 1993 (age 33) Mangaia, Cook Islands
- Height: 1.68 m (5 ft 6 in)
- Weight: 79 kg (174 lb)

Sport
- Country: Cook Islands
- Sport: Athletics
- Event: 100 metres

Achievements and titles
- Personal best: 11.72s
- Updated on 12 August 2012

Patrick Tuara (born 23 March 1993) is a male sprinter from the Cook Islands who represented his country at the 2012 Summer Olympics in London. Participating in the men's 100 metre sprint, he finished eighth in the fourth preliminary heat with a personal best time of 11.72 seconds.

Tuara is from Mangaia.

In June 2012 he was selected for the Cook Islands team for the 2012 Olympic games. He subsequently competed in the 2012 Oceania Athletics Championships, setting a personal best in the 100 meters sprint.
