= Sortelina Pires =

São Tomé and Principe sprinter

Personal information
- Native name: Sortelina da Silva Pires
- Nationality: São Tomé and Príncipe
- Born: Sortelina da Silva; June 29, 1977 (age 48)
- Height: 165 cm (5 ft 5 in)
- Weight: 56 kg (123 lb)

Sport
- Country: São Tomé and Príncipe
- Sport: Athletics
- Updated on 17 October 2016

Sortelina da Silva Pires (born 29 June 1977) is a São Tomé and Principe sprint athlete, specializing in the 100 metres. She was the first woman to represent São Tomé and Principe at the Olympics.

She competed at the 1996 Summer Olympic Games in the women's 100 metres, where she finished eighth, last in her heat and 53rd overall, with a time of 13.31 seconds and failed to advance to the next round. Her time was almost a second and a half slower than the seventh-place finisher in her heat, Mirtha Brock of Colombia, and the fourth-slowest of anyone in the entire competition. She also served as the flag bearer for São Tomé and Principe during the opening ceremony.

Pires previously competed at the 1994 World Junior Championships in Athletics, where she finished seventh, last in her heat, in the Women's 100 metres, with a time of 13.19 seconds. As a result, she failed to advance to the quarterfinals. Pires' time was the third-worst in the competition, and 0.8 seconds behind the next-worst finisher in her heat. At the 1995 World Championships in Athletics, she competed in the Women's 100 metres, and again finished last in her heat, with a time of 13.16 seconds, failing to advance. Among athletes who finished the race, only three had a slower time than Pires. Rahela Markt, who finished in sixth place in the same heat, was over a full second faster.

As São Tomé and Principe made its Olympic debut in 1996, Pires is the first Santomean woman to compete at the Olympic Games as well as the first flagbearer for her country. Pires' personal best time in the 100 metres is 12.44 seconds, which she achieved in 1994.

Olympic Games
Preceded by First participation	Flagbearer for São Tomé and Príncipe; Atlanta 1996	Succeeded by Naide Gomes
