= Romário Leitão =

São Toméan long-distance runner

Romário Martins Leitão (born January 16, 1997) is an Olympic long distance runner from São Tomé and Príncipe. He competed at the 2016 Summer Olympics in the men's 5000 metres race, where he finished 25th in his heat. He did not advance to the final.
