= Alcino Silva =

São Tomé and Príncipe canoeist (born 1990)

Alcino Gomes da Silva, often known as Alcino Silva (born September 30, 1990), is a sprint canoer from São Tomé and Príncipe who competed in the late 2000s. Silva represented his country at the 2008 Summer Olympics in Beijing, where he competed in two kayak events and became the first Santomean athlete to compete at the Olympics in any sport other than track.

In the men's K-1 500 metres, Silva finished sixth in his heat with a time of 1:58.178. Although this was the second-slowest time, both in his heat and in the entire competition, it was enough to advance to the semifinals. However, he was eliminated at that stage after finishing ninth, last in his heat and among all semifinalists, with a time of 2:06.288, failing to advance to the final by a wide margin. All but one athlete finished at least ten seconds faster, and most finished at least 20 seconds faster. At the age of 17, Silva was the youngest competitor in the event, as well as the youngest athlete in the three-person Santomean delegation and the youngest male competitor ever to represent São Tomé and Príncipe at the Olympics.

In the K-1 1000 metres, where he was again the youngest competitor to participate, Silva finished ninth, last in his heat, with a time of 4:28.057. This was the slowest time in the entire competition by a wide margin. The next slowest, Kotoua Francis Abia of Ivory Coast, finished with a time of 4:14.411, almost 14 seconds ahead of Silva. As a result, he failed to advance to the semifinals.

Silva was also runner-up in the K-1 200 metres event at the 2009 African Canoe-Kayak Championships, finishing with a time of 41.62 seconds.
