= D'Jamila Tavares =

Athlete from Sao Tome & Principe

Personal information
- Nationality: São Tomé and Príncipe
- Born: 17 November 1994 (age 31) São Tomé

Sport
- Sport: Track and Field
- Event: 800m

D'Jamila Tavares (born 17 November 1994) is an athlete from São Tomé and Príncipe.

She trains at the Agua de Pena Sports Association on the Portuguese island of Madeira. Tavares was selected to compete in the women's 800 metres at the 2020 Summer Games and was given the honour of being the flag bearer for her nation in the opening ceremony.

Olympic Games
Preceded by Buly Da Conceição Triste	Flag bearer for São Tomé and Príncipe; Tokyo 2020 with Buly Da Conceição Triste	Succeeded by Roldeney de Oliveira; Gorete Semedo
