= Odair Baia =

São Tomé and Principe sprinter

Odair Pericles dos Ramos Jesús da Costa Baia (born 11 April 1978) is a São Tomé and Principe sprint athlete. He competed at the 1996 Summer Olympic Games in the men's 100 metres and finished ninth in his heat, failing to advance.

Baia also competed in the 100 metres at the 1994 World Athletics Junior Championships. He finished seventh in his heat, failing to advance. This tied for the best finish ever by an athlete from São Tomé and Principe at the World Athletics Junior Championships.
