= Canoeing at the 2019 African Games =

- Venue: Barrage Mohammed Ben Abdellah
- Location: Salé, Morocco
- Dates: 28 – 30 August

Canoeing at the 2019 African Games was held from 28 to 30 August 2019 in Salé, Morocco.

The event served as a qualifier for the 2020 Summer Olympics in Tokyo, Japan.

== Participating nations ==
- Algeria
- Angola
- Djibouti
- Egypt
- Ivory Coast
- Morocco
- Mozambique
- Nigeria
- São Tomé and Príncipe
- Senegal
- Seychelles
- South Africa
- Sudan
- Tunisia

== Medal summary ==
=== Men ===
Event	Gold	Silver	Bronze
C-1 200 metres	Ghailene Khattali; Tunisia	Joaquim Lobo; Mozambique	Buly Da Conceição Triste; São Tomé and Príncipe
C-1 1000 metres	Ghailene Khattali; Tunisia	Buly Da Conceição Triste; São Tomé and Príncipe	Sanda Benilson; Angola
C-2 200 metres	Mozambique (MOZ); Nordino Mussa; Tualibudine Mussa	Angola (ANG); Manuel Jose Miego Antonio; Aldair Domingos Paulo Neto	Tunisia (TUN); Ghailene Khattali; Mohamed Kendaoui
C-2 1000 metres	São Tomé and Príncipe (STP); Buly Da Conceição Triste; Roque Fernandes Dos Ramos	Angola (ANG); Manuel Jose Miego Antonio; Aldair Domingos Paulo Neto	Tunisia (TUN); Ghailene Khattali; Mohamed Kendaoui
K-1 200 metres	Chrisjan Coetzee; South Africa	Mohamed Ali Mrabet; Tunisia	Ali Ahmed; Egypt
K-1 1000 metres	Mohamed Ali Mrabet; Tunisia	Louis Hattingh; South Africa	Oussama Djabali; Algeria
K-2 200 metres	South Africa (RSA); Chrisjan Coetzee; Jarred Gibson	Egypt (EGY); Momen Mahran; Ali Ahmed	Tunisia (TUN); Outail Khatali; Mohamed Ali Mrabet
K-2 1000 metres	South Africa (RSA); Louis Hattingh; Jarred Gibson	Tunisia (TUN); Outail Khatali; Mohamed Ali Mrabet	Egypt (EGY); Ahmed Elbedwihy; Amr Abouzeid
K-4 500 metres	South Africa (RSA); Chrisjan Coetzee; Jarred Gibson; Louis Hattingh; Sifiso Masina	Egypt (EGY); Amr Abouzeid; Ali Ahmed; Ahmed Elbedwihy; Momen Mahran	Algeria (ALG); Abdelhamid Djellouli; Ayoub Haidra; Samir Laouar; Abderrahmane Ouldkaddour

=== Women ===
Event	Gold	Silver	Bronze
C-1 200 metres	Ayomide Emmanuel Bello; Nigeria	Oulimata Ba Fall; Senegal	Nedra Trabelsi; Tunisia
C-1 500 metres	Ayomide Emmanuel Bello; Nigeria	Nedra Trabelsi; Tunisia	Combe Seck; Senegal
C-2 200 metres	Nigeria (NGR); Ayomide Emmanuel Bello; Tubereferia Goodness Foloki	Senegal (SEN); Oulimata Ba Fall; Combe Seck	Tunisia (TUN); Ghada Belhaj; Nedra Trabelsi
C-2 500 metres	Nigeria (NGR); Ayomide Emmanuel Bello; Tubereferia Goodness Foloki	Senegal (SEN); Oulimata Ba Fall; Combe Seck	Tunisia (TUN); Ghada Belhaj; Nedra Trabelsi
K-1 200 metres	Esti van Tonder; South Africa	Khaoula Sassi; Tunisia	Samaa Ahmed; Egypt
K-1 500 metres	Esti van Tonder; South Africa	Khaoula Sassi; Tunisia	Samaa Ahmed; Egypt
K-2 200 metres	Morocco (MAR); Laila Bouchir; Chaymaa Guemra	Egypt (EGY); Samaa Ahmed; Farah Mohamed	South Africa (RSA); Bridgitte Hartley; Donna Hutton
K-2 500 metres	South Africa (RSA); Bridgitte Hartley; Donna Hutton	Tunisia (TUN); Afef Ben Ismail; Khaoula Sassi	Egypt (EGY); Habiba Ahmed; Farah Mohamed
K-4 500 metres	South Africa (RSA); Bridgitte Hartley; Donna Hutton; Nosipho Mthembu; Esti van Tonder	Egypt (EGY); Rawan Abouarram; Habiba Ahmed; Samaa Ahmed; Farah Mohamed	Morocco (MAR); Zina Aboudalal; Laila Bouchir; Chaymaa Guemra; Salma Khabot

== Medal table ==
* Host nation (Morocco)

Rank	Nation	Gold	Silver	Bronze	Total
1	South Africa (RSA)	8	1	1	10
2	Nigeria (NGR)	4	0	0	4
3	Tunisia (TUN)	3	6	6	15
4	São Tomé and Príncipe (STP)	1	1	1	3
5	Mozambique (MOZ)	1	1	0	2
6	Morocco (MAR)*	1	0	1	2
7	Egypt (EGY)	0	4	5	9
8	Senegal (SEN)	0	3	1	4
9	Angola (ANG)	0	2	1	3
10	Algeria (ALG)	0	0	2	2
Totals (10 entries)		18	18	18	54
