= Naiel Santiago D'Almeida =

Personal information
- Full name: Santiago
- Nickname: Santy24Fitt
- Nationality: São Tomé and Príncipe
- Born: 20 October 1986 (age 39)
- Height: 1.71 m (5 ft 7 1/2 in)
- Weight: 65 kg (143 lb)

Sport
- Sport: Athletics
- Event: 400 metres
- Now coaching: Coaching people at Jetts Gestel

Achievements and titles
- Personal best: 400 m: 48.85 s (2007)

Naiel Santiago D'Almeida (born October 20, 1986) is a Santomean sprinter, who specialized in the 400 metres. D'Almeida represented São Tomé and Príncipe at the 2008 Summer Olympics in Beijing, where he competed for the men's 400 metres. He ran in the seventh heat, against seven other athletes, including defending Olympic champion Jeremy Wariner of the United States. He finished the race in last place by two seconds behind Benin's Mathieu Gnanligo, with a time of 49.08 seconds. D'Almeida, however, failed to advance into the semi-finals, as he placed fifty-fourth overall, and was ranked farther below three mandatory slots for the next round.
