= Fumilay Fonseca =

São Toméan race walker

Fumilay Fonseca (born 24 May 1988) is a São Toméan race walker.

At the age of sixteen, she appeared at the 2004 Summer Olympics finishing at 52nd place with a time of 2:04.54 hours. It was described as "one of the worst times on record" and was about 15 minutes behind the next-to-last finisher. She was also the flag bearer for her country at the opening ceremony.

The next year she placed 24th at the 2005 World Youth Championships.
