= Roque Fernandes dos Ramos =

São Tomé and Príncipe canoeist

Personal information
- Nationality: São Tomé and Príncipe
- Born: 13 January 1998 (age 28)
- Height: 170 cm (5 ft 7 in)
- Weight: 70 kg (154 lb)

Sport
- Sport: Canoeing
- Event: Men's C-2 1000 metres
Medal record
African Games
Gold medal – first place	2019 Rabat	C-2 1000 m

Roque Fernandes dos Ramos (born 13 January 1998) is a São Tomé and Príncipe sprint canoeist. He competed in the 2020 Summer Olympics.
