= São Tomé and Príncipe Olympic Committee =

National Olympic Committee

- Country: São Tomé and Príncipe
- [[|]]
- Code: STP
- Recognized: 1993
- Continental Association: ANOCA
- Headquarters: São Tomé, São Tomé and Príncipe
- President: João Manuel da Costa Alegre Afonso
- Secretary General: Laureano Lima Ferreira Soares

The São Tomé and Príncipe Olympic Committee (Portuguese: Comité Olímpico de São Tomé e Príncipe) (IOC code: STP) is the National Olympic Committee representing São Tomé and Príncipe.

== See also ==
- São Tomé and Príncipe at the Olympics
