= Buly Da Conceição Triste =

São Tomé and Príncipe canoeist (born 1991)

Personal information
- Born: 4 July 1991 (age 35) São Tomé
- Height: 164 cm (5 ft 5 in)
- Weight: 58 kg (128 lb)

Sport
- Country: São Tomé and Príncipe
- Sport: Canoe sprint
Medal record
African Games
Gold medal – first place	2019 Rabat	C-2 1000 m
Silver medal – second place	2019 Rabat	C-1 1000 m
Bronze medal – third place	2019 Rabat	C-1 200 m

Buly Da Conceição Triste (born 4 July 1991) is a sprint canoeist from São Tomé and Príncipe. He competed at the 2016 Summer Olympics in the men's C-1 1000 metres event; his time of 4:46.396 in the semifinals did not qualify him for the finals. He was the flag bearer for São Tomé and Príncipe at the Parade of Nations.

He won a gold, a silver and a bronze medal at the 2019 African Games.

He competed at the 2020 Summer Olympics.

Olympic Games
Preceded by Lecabela Quaresma	Flag bearer for São Tomé and Príncipe; 2016 Rio de Janeiro Tokyo 2020 with D'Jamila Tavares	Succeeded by Roldeney de Oliveira; Gorete Semedo
