= Christopher Lima da Costa =

São Tomé and Príncipe sprinter

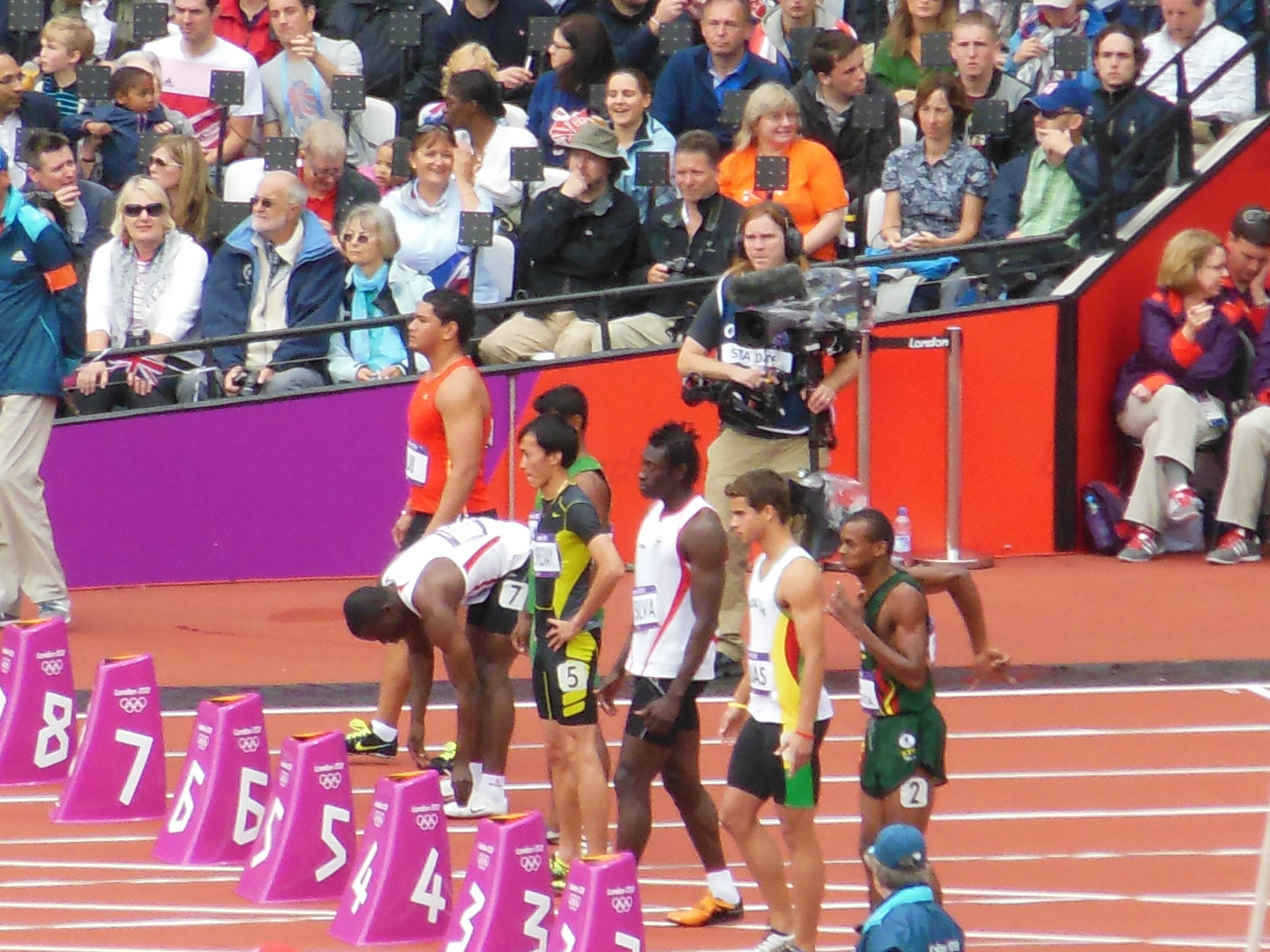
Da Costa (Lane 2) before the start of heat 1 of the 100 m at the 2012 Summer Olympics.

Christopher Lima da Costa (born 19 January 1988 in Libreville, Gabon) is a Gabonese-born São Toméan athlete. He competed in the 100 m event at the 2012 Summer Olympics but was eliminated in the preliminary round despite posting a personal best time of 11.56.

Da Costa also represented his country at the 100 metres in the 2011 World Championships in Athletics in Daegu and at the 100 metres in the 2013 World Championships in Athletics in Moscow. Both times he was eliminated in the preliminaries.
