= Gorete Semedo =

São Tomé and Príncipe sprinter

Personal information
- Full name: Gorete Borges Tavares Semedo
- Born: 5 October 1996 (age 29) São Tomé and Príncipe

Sport
- Country: São Tomé and Príncipe
- Sport: Track and field
- Events: 100 metres; 200 metres

Gorete Borges Tavares Semedo (born 5 October 1996) is a São Tomé and Príncipe track and field athlete competing in sprinting events. In 2017, she competed in the women's 100 metres event at the 2017 World Championships in Athletics held in London, United Kingdom. She did not advance to compete in the semi-finals.

== Career ==
In 2019, she represented São Tomé and Príncipe at the 2019 African Games held in Rabat, Morocco. She competed in both the women's 100 metres and women's 200 metres events. In the 100 metres event she reached the semi-finals where she was disqualified after a false start and in the 200 metres event she did not advance to compete in the semi-finals. In the same year, she also competed in the women's 100 metres event at the 2019 World Athletics Championships held in Doha, Qatar. She did not qualify to compete in the semi-finals.

Olympic Games
Preceded by Buly Da Conceição Triste; D'Jamila Tavares	Flag bearer for São Tomé and Príncipe; Paris 2024 with Roldeney de Oliveira	Succeeded by Incumbent
