= 2009 World Championships in Athletics – Women's heptathlon =

The Women's Heptathlon at the 2009 World Championships in Athletics was held at the Olympic Stadium on August 16 and August 17. A number of high-profile heptathletes did not feature at the competition, including defending champion Carolina Klüft and 2007 bronze medallist Kelly Sotherton, who were both injured, and Olympic silver medallist Hyleas Fountain, who failed to qualify at the national championships.

Nataliya Dobrynska, the 2008 Olympic champion, was highly favoured to win the event, while Great Britain's Jessica Ennis was predicted to improve upon her own world leading mark of 6587 points. Tatyana Chernova, Ukrainians Hanna Melnychenko and Lyudmyla Yosypenko, and Germans Jennifer Oeser and Lilli Schwarzkopf were cited as medal contenders.

After the first day, Ennis had built up a considerable lead, winning three of the four events and ending the day more than three hundred points ahead of second-ranked Dobrynska. Ennis' first day total of 4124 points was the third highest ever first day score in the heptathlon, behind Kluft and world record holder Jackie Joyner-Kersee. On the second day, unusually for a heptathlon competition, Linda Züblin set a Swiss record in the javelin throw. Ennis maintained her lead with competitive marks in the long jump and javelin throw (her weaker events) and she won the final 800 metres race, gaining her first major championship gold medal and setting a world leading mark and much improved personal best of 6731 points to win by 238 points. Olympic champion Dobrynska faded into fourth place on the final day, while Jennifer Oeser set a personal best for the silver medal and Kamila Chudzik took bronze, Poland's first ever heptathlon medal at the competition.

The competition represented a breakthrough for Ennis, who had missed the 2008 Beijing Olympics through injury and whose previous best result was fourth place at the 2007 World Championships. She was Great Britain's first gold medallist of the tournament, and she became the country's third woman multi-eventer to win a major global championship, after former Olympic champions Mary Peters and Denise Lewis.

== Medalists ==
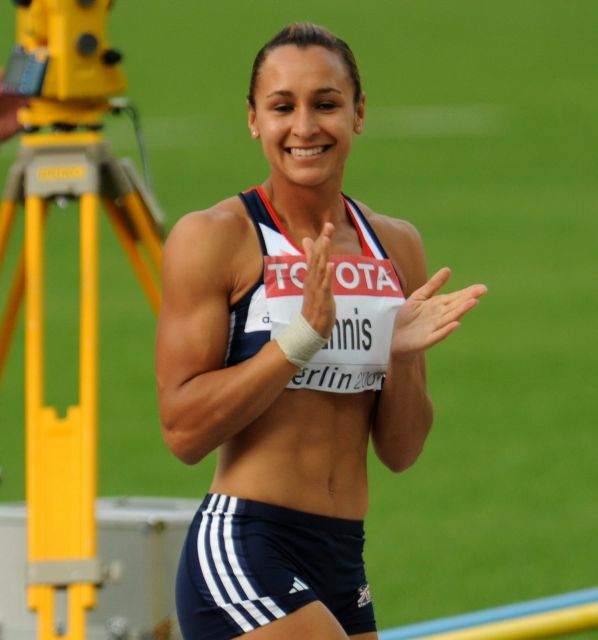
Jessica Ennis also had the world-leading mark before the Championships

Gold	Jessica Ennis; Great Britain & N.I. (GBR)
Silver	Jennifer Oeser; Germany (GER)
Bronze	Kamila Chudzik; Poland (POL)

== Records ==
Standing records prior to the 2009 World Athletics Championships
World record	Jackie Joyner-Kersee (USA)	7291	Seoul, South Korea	24 September 1988
Championship record	Jackie Joyner-Kersee (USA)	7128	Rome, Italy	1 September 1987
World leading	Jessica Ennis (GBR)	6587	Desenzano del Garda, Italy	10 May 2009
African record	Margaret Simpson (GHA)	6423	Götzis, Austria	29 May 2005
Asian record	Ghada Shouaa (SYR)	6942	Götzis, Austria	26 May 1996
North American record	Jackie Joyner-Kersee (USA)	7291	Seoul, South Korea	24 September 1988
South American record	Lucimara da Silva (BRA)	6076	Beijing, China	16 August 2008
European record	Carolina Klüft (SWE)	7032	Osaka, Japan	26 August 2007
Oceanian record	Jane Flemming (AUS)	6695	Auckland, New Zealand	28 January 1990

== Qualification standards ==
A standard	B standard
6100pts	5900pts

== Schedule ==
Date	Time	Round
August 15, 2009	10:10	100 metres hurdles
August 15, 2009	11:20	High jump
August 15, 2009	18:20	Shot put
August 15, 2009	21:10	200 metres
August 16, 2009	11:35	Long jump
August 16, 2009	18:05	Javelin throw
August 16, 2009	20:50	800 metres
August 16, 2009	20:50	Final standings

== Results ==
=== 100 metres hurdles ===
Rank	Heat	Name	Nationality	Time	Points	Notes
1	1	Jessica Ennis	Great Britain & N.I.	12.93	1135	
2	4	Antoinette Nana Djimou	France	13.44	1059	PB
3	1	Sara Aerts	Belgium	13.45	1058	
4	1	Kamila Chudzik	Poland	13.50	1050	SB
4	1	Diana Pickler	United States	13.50	1050	
6	4	Tatyana Chernova	Russia	13.58	1039	SB
7	1	Hanna Melnychenko	Ukraine	13.60	1036	
7	3	Louise Hazel	Great Britain & N.I.	13.60	1036	SB
9	1	Jennifer Oeser	Germany	13.62	1033	
10	4	Lyudmyla Yosypenko	Ukraine	13.64	1030	PB
11	1	Yvonne Wisse	Netherlands	13.66	1027	SB
12	3	Karolina Tymińska	Poland	13.67	1026	SB
13	4	Brianne Theisen	Canada	13.69	1023	PB
14	4	Linda Züblin	Switzerland	13.75	1014	SB
15	1	Aiga Grabuste	Latvia	13.78	1010	
15	4	Marisa De Aniceto	France	13.78	1010	
17	2	Bettie Wade	United States	13.79	1008	PB
18	2	Lilli Schwarzkopf	Germany	13.80	1007	SB
19	2	Nataliya Dobrynska	Ukraine	13.85	1000	SB
20	2	Sharon Day	United States	13.90	993	
21	3	Jessica Samuelsson	Sweden	13.96	984	SB
22	2	Kaie Kand	Estonia	13.99	980	
23	2	Aryiro Strataki	Greece	14.17	954	
24	4	Yuliya Tarasova	Uzbekistan	14.23	946	
25	3	Julia Mächtig	Germany	14.40	923	
25	3	Nadja Casadei	Sweden	14.40	923	
27	3	Ida Marcussen	Norway	14.51	907	
28	2	Sushmitha Singha Roy	India	14.55	902	
29	3	Eliška Klučinová	Czech Republic	14.89	856	

Key: PB = Personal best, SB = Seasonal best

=== High jump ===
Rank	Group	Name	Nationality	Result	Points	Notes
1	B	Jessica Ennis	Great Britain & N.I.	1.92	1132	SB
2	B	Sharon Day	United States	1.89	1093	
3	B	Lyudmyla Yosypenko	Ukraine	1.86	1054	
4	B	Julia Mächtig	Germany	1.83	1016	PB
4	B	Hanna Melnychenko	Ukraine	1.83	1016	
6	B	Nataliya Dobrynska	Ukraine	1.83	1016	SB
7	B	Jennifer Oeser	Germany	1.83	1016	SB
8	B	Bettie Wade	United States	1.80	978	
9	B	Marisa De Aniceto	France	1.77	941	
10	B	Diana Pickler	United States	1.77	941	
10	A	Antoinette Nana Djimou	France	1.77	941	SB
10	A	Brianne Theisen	Canada	1.77	941	PB
13	A	Kamila Chudzik	Poland	1.74	903	
14	B	Lilli Schwarzkopf	Germany	1.74	903	
15	B	Tatyana Chernova	Russia	1.74	903	
16	B	Eliška Klučinová	Czech Republic	1.71	867	
16	A	Kaie Kand	Estonia	1.71	867	
18	B	Aiga Grabuste	Latvia	1.71	867	
18	A	Louise Hazel	Great Britain & N.I.	1.71	867	PB
20	A	Karolina Tymińska	Poland	1.71	867	
21	A	Aryiro Strataki	Greece	1.71	867	
22	A	Yvonne Wisse	Netherlands	1.68	830	
22	A	Nadja Casadei	Sweden	1.68	830	
22	A	Jessica Samuelsson	Sweden	1.68	830	
25	B	Sara Aerts	Belgium	1.68	830	
26	A	Yuliya Tarasova	Uzbekistan	1.68	830	
27	A	Ida Marcussen	Norway	1.65	795	
28	A	Sushmitha Singha Roy	India	1.62	759	
29	A	Linda Züblin	Switzerland	1.62	759	

Key: PB = Personal best, SB = Seasonal best

=== Shot put ===
Rank	Group	Name	Nationality	Result	Points	Notes
1	B	Nataliya Dobrynska	Ukraine	15.82	916	SB
2	B	Julia Mächtig	Germany	15.21	875	
3	B	Kamila Chudzik	Poland	15.10	868	PB
4	B	Jennifer Oeser	Germany	14.29	813	PB
5	B	Jessica Ennis	Great Britain & N.I.	14.14	803	PB
6	B	Antoinette Nana Djimou	France	14.04	797	
7	B	Karolina Tymińska	Poland	13.75	777	
8	A	Hanna Melnychenko	Ukraine	13.70	774	SB
9	B	Jessica Samuelsson	Sweden	13.56	765	
10	B	Lilli Schwarzkopf	Germany	13.43	756	
11	A	Sharon Day	United States	13.42	755	PB
12	A	Eliška Klučinová	Czech Republic	13.40	754	
13	B	Aiga Grabuste	Latvia	13.26	745	
14	A	Linda Züblin	Switzerland	13.16	738	PB
15	A	Lyudmyla Yosypenko	Ukraine	13.01	728	
16	A	Aryiro Strataki	Greece	12.93	723	
17	B	Yuliya Tarasova	Uzbekistan	12.92	722	
18	B	Nadja Casadei	Sweden	12.92	722	
19	A	Kaie Kand	Estonia	12.83	716	
20	A	Ida Marcussen	Norway	12.71	708	
21	B	Yvonne Wisse	Netherlands	12.53	696	
22	A	Tatyana Chernova	Russia	12.43	690	
23	B	Diana Pickler	United States	12.40	688	
24	A	Marisa De Aniceto	France	12.21	675	
25	A	Louise Hazel	Great Britain & N.I.	11.62	636	
26	A	Sushmitha Singha Roy	India	11.15	605	
27	A	Brianne Theisen	Canada	11.07	600	
	B	Bettie Wade	United States	NM		
	A	Sara Aerts	Belgium	DNS		

Key: PB = Personal best, SB = Seasonal best

=== 200 metres ===
Rank	Heat	Name	Nationality	Time	Points	Notes
1	1	Jessica Ennis	Great Britain & N.I.	23.25	1054	SB
2	1	Lyudmyla Yosypenko	Ukraine	23.86	994	
3	1	Karolina Tymińska	Poland	23.87	993	
4	1	Hanna Melnychenko	Ukraine	24.11	970	PB
5	1	Tatyana Chernova	Russia	24.13	968	
6	3	Louise Hazel	Great Britain & N.I.	24.19	963	SB
7	3	Jennifer Oeser	Germany	24.30	952	PB
8	3	Kamila Chudzik	Poland	24.33	949	PB
9	3	Julia Mächtig	Germany	24.39	944	SB
10	3	Yuliya Tarasova	Uzbekistan	24.60	924	
11	1	Brianne Theisen	Canada	24.62	922	
12	1	Jessica Samuelsson	Sweden	24.71	914	
13	2	Diana Pickler	United States	24.75	910	SB
14	1	Yvonne Wisse	Netherlands	24.78	907	
15	4	Antoinette Nana Djimou	France	24.83	902	SB
16	2	Nadja Casadei	Sweden	24.92	894	PB
17	4	Bettie Wade	United States	24.98	889	SB
18	3	Nataliya Dobrynska	Ukraine	25.02	885	
19	3	Linda Züblin	Switzerland	25.04	883	
20	4	Sharon Day	United States	25.15	873	
21	2	Marisa De Aniceto	France	25.32	858	
22	4	Aiga Grabuste	Latvia	25.49	842	
23	2	Ida Marcussen	Norway	25.59	833	
24	4	Sushmitha Singha Roy	India	25.65	828	
25	2	Aryiro Strataki	Greece	25.93	803	
26	2	Kaie Kand	Estonia	26.07	791	
27	4	Eliška Klučinová	Czech Republic	26.17	782	
	2	Lilli Schwarzkopf	Germany	DNS		
	4	Sara Aerts	Belgium	DNS		

Key: PB = Personal best, SB = Seasonal best

=== Long jump ===
Rank	Group	Name	Nationality	Result	Points	Notes
1	B	Kamila Chudzik	Poland	6.55	1023	PB
2	B	Tatyana Chernova	Russia	6.50	1007	SB
3	B	Hanna Melnychenko	Ukraine	6.43	985	PB
4	B	Jennifer Oeser	Germany	6.42	981	
5	B	Nataliya Dobrynska	Ukraine	6.41	978	
6	A	Aiga Grabuste	Latvia	6.40	975	SB
7	B	Julia Mächtig	Germany	6.36	962	
8	A	Antoinette Nana Djimou	France	6.32	949	SB
9	B	Jessica Ennis	Great Britain & N.I.	6.29	940	
10	B	Diana Pickler	United States	6.24	924	SB
11	B	Yuliya Tarasova	Uzbekistan	6.23	921	
12	B	Lyudmyla Yosypenko	Ukraine	6.20	912	
13	B	Bettie Wade	United States	6.18	905	
14	B	Louise Hazel	Great Britain & N.I.	6.13	890	
15	A	Kaie Kand	Estonia	5.99	846	SB
16	A	Marisa De Aniceto	France	5.97	840	
17	A	Jessica Samuelsson	Sweden	5.90	819	
18	A	Aryiro Strataki	Greece	5.87	810	
19	B	Yvonne Wisse	Netherlands	5.87	810	
20	A	Brianne Theisen	Canada	5.82	795	
21	B	Nadja Casadei	Sweden	5.78	783	
21	A	Eliška Klučinová	Czech Republic	5.78	783	
23	A	Sharon Day	United States	5.69	756	
24	A	Linda Züblin	Switzerland	5.69	756	
25	A	Sushmitha Singha Roy	India	5.43	680	
	A	Ida Marcussen	Norway	NM		
	B	Karolina Tymińska	Poland	DNS		

Key: PB = Personal best, SB = Seasonal best

=== Javelin throw ===
Rank	Group	Name	Nationality	Result	Points	Notes
1	A	Linda Züblin	Switzerland	53.01	919	NR
2	A	Ida Marcussen	Norway	50.02	861	
3	A	Kamila Chudzik	Poland	48.72	835	
4	A	Marisa De Aniceto	France	48.39	829	PB
5	A	Antoinette Nana Djimou	France	47.93	820	
6	A	Lyudmyla Yosypenko	Ukraine	46.87	800	
7	B	Jennifer Oeser	Germany	46.70	796	SB
8	B	Sharon Day	United States	44.14	747	PB
9	A	Brianne Theisen	Canada	43.84	741	
10	A	Jessica Ennis	Great Britain & N.I.	43.54	735	
11	A	Aiga Grabuste	Latvia	43.52	735	
12	B	Louise Hazel	Great Britain & N.I.	43.51	735	
13	A	Nataliya Dobrynska	Ukraine	43.29	731	
14	B	Aryiro Strataki	Greece	42.87	722	
15	A	Hanna Melnychenko	Ukraine	42.24	710	
16	A	Tatyana Chernova	Russia	41.88	703	
17	A	Eliška Klučinová	Czech Republic	41.19	690	
18	B	Diana Pickler	United States	41.13	689	
19	B	Yuliya Tarasova	Uzbekistan	40.88	684	
20	A	Julia Mächtig	Germany	40.70	681	
21	B	Kaie Kand	Estonia	37.68	623	
22	B	Jessica Samuelsson	Sweden	37.15	613	SB
23	B	Bettie Wade	United States	36.70	604	PB
24	B	Sushmitha Singha Roy	India	36.03	591	
25	B	Yvonne Wisse	Netherlands	33.82	549	
26	B	Nadja Casadei	Sweden	32.30	520	

Key: NR = National record, PB = Personal best, SB = Seasonal best

=== 800 metres ===
Rank	Heat	Name	Nationality	Time	Points	Notes
1	3	Tatyana Chernova	Russia	2:09.11	978	SB
2	2	Jessica Samuelsson	Sweden	2:10.34	960	
3	2	Kaie Kand	Estonia	2:11.92	937	
4	4	Jessica Ennis	Great Britain & N.I.	2:12.22	932	
5	2	Brianne Theisen	Canada	2:12.62	927	PB
6	1	Nadja Casadei	Sweden	2:12.66	926	
7	4	Hanna Melnychenko	Ukraine	2:12.85	923	PB
8	4	Nataliya Dobrynska	Ukraine	2:13.22	918	
9	1	Ida Marcussen	Norway	2:13.81	910	
10	3	Sharon Day	United States	2:13.84	909	
11	4	Jennifer Oeser	Germany	2:14.34	902	
12	4	Lyudmyla Yosypenko	Ukraine	2:14.64	898	SB
13	3	Marisa De Aniceto	France	2:14.80	896	
14	1	Yvonne Wisse	Netherlands	2:15.58	885	
15	3	Diana Pickler	United States	2:15.60	884	PB
16	3	Louise Hazel	Great Britain & N.I.	2:15.85	881	PB
17	2	Aryiro Strataki	Greece	2:16.72	869	
18	2	Linda Züblin	Switzerland	2:17.01	865	
19	4	Julia Mächtig	Germany	2:17.07	864	
20	3	Aiga Grabuste	Latvia	2:17.43	859	SB
21	4	Antoinette Nana Djimou	France	2:17.72	855	SB
22	4	Kamila Chudzik	Poland	2:18.58	843	
23	1	Eliška Klučinová	Czech Republic	2:23.79	773	
24	1	Bettie Wade	United States	2:25.50	750	
25	2	Yuliya Tarasova	Uzbekistan	2:35.05	631	
26	1	Sushmitha Singha Roy	India	2:36.13	618	

Key: PB = Personal best, SB = Seasonal best

=== Final standings ===
Rank	Athlete	Country	Points	Notes
1st place, gold medalist(s)	Jessica Ennis	Great Britain & N.I.	6731	WL
2nd place, silver medalist(s)	Jennifer Oeser	Germany	6493	PB
3rd place, bronze medalist(s)	Kamila Chudzik	Poland	6471	SB
4	Nataliya Dobrynska	Ukraine	6444	
5	Lyudmyla Yosypenko	Ukraine	6416	PB
6	Hanna Melnychenko	Ukraine	6414	
7	Antoinette Nana Djimou	France	6323	PB
8	Tatyana Chernova	Russia	6288	
9	Julia Mächtig	Germany	6265	
10	Sharon Day	United States	6126	
11	Diana Pickler	United States	6086	
12	Marisa De Aniceto	France	6049	
13	Aiga Grabuste	Latvia	6033	
14	Louise Hazel	Great Britain & N.I.	6008	
15	Brianne Theisen	Canada	5949	
16	Linda Züblin	Switzerland	5934	
17	Jessica Samuelsson	Sweden	5885	
18	Kaie Kand	Estonia	5760	
19	Aryiro Strataki	Greece	5748	
20	Yvonne Wisse	Netherlands	5704	
21	Yuliya Tarasova	Uzbekistan	5658	
22	Nadja Casadei	Sweden	5598	
23	Eliška Klučinová	Czech Republic	5505	
24	Bettie Wade	United States	5134	
25	Ida Marcussen	Norway	5014	
26	Sushmitha Singha Roy	India	4983	
	Karolina Tymińska	Poland	DNF	
	Lilli Schwarzkopf	Germany	DNF	
	Sara Aerts	Belgium	DNF	

Key: DNF = Did not finish, PB = Personal best, SB = Seasonal best, WL = World leading (in a given season)
