= 2007 World Championships in Athletics – Women's heptathlon =

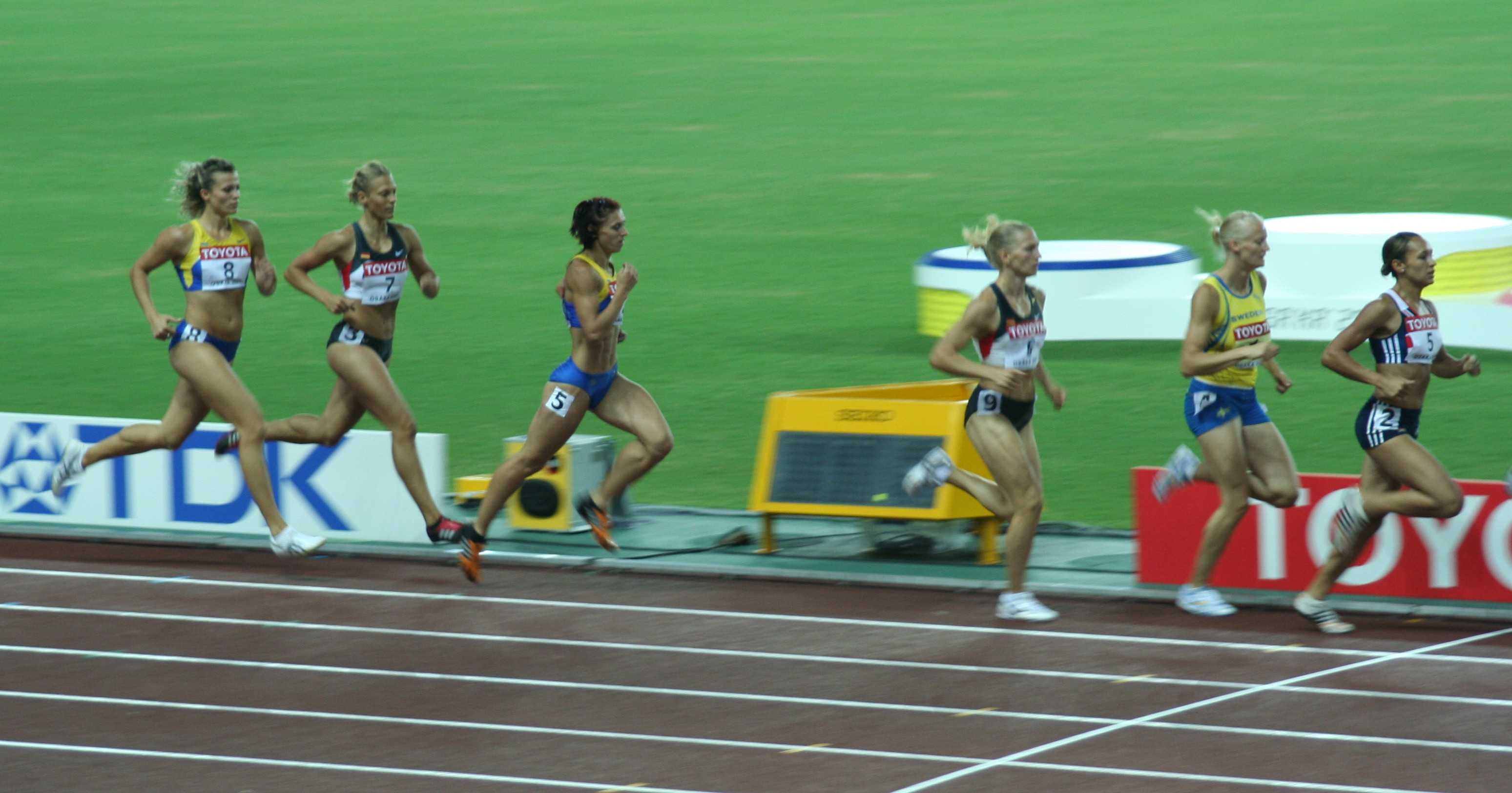
800 m event

The women's heptathlon event at the 2007 World Championships in Athletics took place from August 25–26, 2007 at the Nagai Stadium in Osaka, Japan. The competition is notable for having the highest number of competitors (39) in the World Championships history. The winning margin was 200 points.

== Medalists ==
| Gold | Carolina Klüft; Sweden (SWE) |
| Silver | Lyudmila Blonska; Ukraine (UKR) |
| Bronze | Kelly Sotherton; Great Britain & N.I. (GBR) |

== Schedule ==
August 25, 2007
1. 100 m hurdles
2. High Jump
3. Shot Put
4. 200 m

August 26, 2007
5. Long Jump
6. Javelin Throw
7. 800 m

== Records ==
Standing records prior to the 2003 World Athletics Championships
| World Record | Jackie Joyner-Kersee | United States | 7291 | September 24, 1988 | Seoul, South Korea |
| Event Record | Jackie Joyner-Kersee | United States | 7128 | September 1, 1987 | Rome, Italy |

== Overall results ==
Points table after final event :

| Rank | Athlete | Nation | Overall points | Overview by event (points on top, then result. Best performance in each event shown in green) | | | | | | |
| Rank | Athlete | Nation | Overall points | 100 mh | HJ | SP | 200 m | LJ | JT | 800 m |
|---|---|---|---|---|---|---|---|---|---|---|
| 1st place, gold medalist(s) | Carolina Klüft | Sweden | 7032 WL AR | 1102 pts 13.15 | 1171; 1.95 | 848; 14.81 | 1041; 23.38 | 1122; 6.85 | 821; 47.98 | 927; 2:12.56 |
| 2nd place, silver medalist(s) | Lyudmila Blonska | Ukraine | 6832 NR | 1087 pts 13.25 | 1132; 1.92 | 823; 14.44 | 972; 24.09 | 1132; 6.88 | 817; 47.77 | 869; 2:16.68 |
| 3rd place, bronze medalist(s) | Kelly Sotherton | Great Britain & N.I. | 6510 SB | 1093 pts 13.21 | 1054; 1.86 | 803; 14.14 | 1039; 23.40 | 1066; 6.68 | 513; 31.90 | 942; 2:11.58 |
| 4 | Jessica Ennis | Great Britain & N.I. | 6469 PB | 1129 pts 12.97 | 1093; 1.89 | 656; 11.93 | 1064; 23.15 | 953; 6.33 | 630; 38.07 | 944; 2:11.39 |
| 5 | Lilli Schwarzkopf | Germany | 6439 PB | 1044 pts 13.54 | 1016; 1.83 | 727; 13.00 | 879; 25.08 | 902; 6.17 | 946; 54.44 | 925; 2:12.76 |
| 6 | Austra Skujytė | Lithuania | 6380 SB | 931 pts 14.34 | 978; 1.80 | 997; 17.03 | 851; 25.39 | 937; 6.28 | 911; 52.63 | 775; 2:23.64 |
| 7 | Jennifer Oeser | Germany | 6378 PB | 1049 pts 13.51 | 1016; 1.83 | 808; 14.21 | 942; 24.41 | 927; 6.25 | 727; 43.10 | 909; 2:13.85 |
| 8 | Nataliya Dobrynska | Ukraine | 6327 SB | 994 pts 13.89 | 941; 1.77 | 949; 16.31 | 895; 24.91 | 887; 6.12 | 787; 46.22 | 874; 2:16.35 |
| 9 | Marie Collonvillé | France | 6244 SB | 1031 pts 13.63 | 1016; 1.83 | 669; 12.12 | 886; 25.01 | 1062; 6.67 | 654; 39.32 | 926; 2:12.68 |
| 10 | Anna Bogdanova | Russia | 6243 | 1020 pts 13.71 | 1016; 1.83 | 749; 13.33 | 887; 25.00 | 994; 6.46 | 666; 39.91 | 911; 2:13.72 |
| 11 | Ida Marcussen | Norway | 6226 NR | 956 pts 14.16 | 830; 1.68 | 727; 13.00 | 925; 24.59 | 997; 6.47 | 880; 51.02 | 911; 2:13.69 |
| 12 | Kylie Wheeler | Australia | 6184 SB | 997 pts 13.87 | 978; 1.80 | 727; 13.00 | 939; 24.44 | 981; 6.42 | 638; 38.49 | 924; 2:12.81 |
| 13 | Sonja Kesselschläger | Germany | 6149 | 1043 pts 13.55 | 978; 1.80 | 811; 14.25 | 842; 25.49 | 912; 6.20 | 723; 42.91 | 840; 2:18.81 |
| 14 | Jolanda Keizer | Netherlands | 6102 | 1003 pts 13.83 | 941; 1.77 | 809; 14.23 | 940; 24.43 | 819; 5.90 | 734; 43.48 | 856; 2:17.61 |
| 15 | Karolina Tymińska | Poland | 6092 | 966 pts 14.09 | 867; 1.71 | 744; 13.25 | 979; 24.02 | 956; 6.34 | 590; 35.97 | 990; 2:08.27 |
| 16 | Yvonne Wisse | Netherlands | 6056 | 1043 pts 13.55 | 978; 1.80 | 697; 12.54 | 943; 24.40 | 843; 5.98 | 624; 37.73 | 928; 2:12.52 |
| 17 | Aiga Grabuste | Latvia | 6019 PB | 1001 pts 13.84 | 941; 1.77 | 730; 13.04 | 889; 24.98 | 856; 6.02 | 778; 45.76 | 824; 2:19.97 |
| 18 | Aryiro Strataki | Greece | 5999 | 976 pts 14.02 | 830; 1.68 | 798; 14.06 | 863; 25.26 | 896; 6.15 | 758; 44.73 | 878; 2:16.06 |
| 19 | Olga Kurban | Russia | 5998 | 993 pts 13.90 | 867; 1.71 | 738; 13.16 | 938; 24.45 | 912; 6.20 | 678; 40.55 | 872; 2:16.48 |
| 20 | Linda Züblin | Switzerland | 5995 PB | 1031 pts 13.63 | 795; 1.65 | 690; 12.43 | 910; 24.75 | 843; 5.98 | 857; 49.85 | 869; 2:16.72 |
| 21 | Kamila Chudzik | Poland | 5926 | 941 pts 14.27 | 867; 1.71 | 748; 13.31 | 887; 25.00 | 801; 5.84 | 899; 52.03 | 783; 2:23.03 |
| 22 | Simone Oberer | Switzerland | 5922 | 1033 pts 13.62 | 978; 1.80 | 674; 12.20 | 827; 25.66 | 862; 6.04 | 679; 40.60 | 869; 2:16.67 |
| 23 | Yuki Nakata | Japan | 5869 SB | 1004 pts 13.82 | 903; 1.74 | 616; 11.31 | 861; 25.28 | 899; 6.16 | 730; 43.26 | 856; 2:17.61 |
| 24 | Irina Naumenko | Kazakhstan | 5848 SB | 947 pts 14.22 | 903; 1.74 | 721; 12.90 | 888; 24.99 | 915; 6.21 | 658; 39.53 | 816; 2:20.52 |
| 25 | Diana Pickler | United States | 5838 | 1074 pts 13.34 | 903; 1.74 | 610; 11.22 | 923; 24.61 | 853; 6.01 | 660; 39.62 | 815; 2:20.63 |
| 26 | Salla Rinne | Finland | 5813 | 1030 pts 13.64 | 903; 1.74 | 811; 14.25 | 818; 25.76 | 810; 5.87 | 822; 48.03 | 619; 2:36.05 |
| 27 | Sylvie Dufour | Switzerland | 5805 | 964 pts 14.10 | 903; 1.74 | 771; 13.65 | 846; 25.45 | 759; 5.70 | 662; 39.75 | 900; 2:14.46 |
| 28 | Vasiliki Delinikola | Greece | 5745 | 1014 pts 13.75 | 867; 1.71 | 756; 13.43 | 881; 25.06 | 840; 5.97 | 709; 42.19 | 678; 2:31.23 |
| 29 | Jessica Samuelsson | Sweden | 5745 | 954 pts 14.17 | 795; 1.65 | 765; 13.56 | 886; 25.01 | 813; 5.88 | 616; 37.30 | 916; 2:13.34 |
| 30 | Kaie Kand | Estonia | 5616 | 947 pts 14.22 | 830; 1.68 | 707; 12.69 | 811; 25.84 | 774; 5.75 | 635; 38.33 | 912; 2:13.63 |
| 31 | Lucimara da Silva | Brazil | 5601 | 1014 pts 13.75 | 903; 1.74 | 553; 10.36 | 874; 25.14 | 837; 5.96 | 626; 37.87 | 794; 2:22.16 |
| 32 | Gretchen Quintana | Cuba | 4954 | 1011 pts 13.77 | 830; 1.68 | 708; 12.71 | 960; 24.22 | 887; 6.12 | 558; 34.31 | 0 DQ |
| — | Virginia Johnson | United States | DNF | 1084 pts 13.27 | 724; 1.59 | 751; 13.36 | 1003; 23.77 | 915; 6.21 | | |
| — | Hyleas Fountain | United States | DNF | 1027 pts 13.66 | 941; 1.77 | 680; 12.29 | 968; 24.13 | 0 NM | | |
| — | Karin Ruckstuhl | Netherlands | DNF | 1083 pts 13.28 | 903; 1.74 | 793; 13.99 | 942; 24.41 | | | |
| — | Tatyana Chernova | Russia | DNF | 1020 pts 13.71 | 978; 1.80 | 760; 13.49 | 808; 25.88 | | | |
| — | Antoinette Nana Djimou Ida | France | DNF | 997 pts 13.87 | 867; 1.71 | 757; 13.44 | 850; 25.41 | | | |
| — | Margaret Simpson | Ghana | DNF | 1023 pts 13.69 | 903; 1.74 | | | | | |
| — | Hanna Melnychenko | Ukraine | DNF | 0 pts DNF | | | | | | |
