= United States at the 2007 World Championships in Athletics =

- WA code: USA
- National federation: USA Track & Field
- Website: usatf.org

in Osaka
- Medals Ranked 1st: Gold 14 Silver 5 Bronze 7 Total 26

World Championships in Athletics appearances (overview)
- 1976; 1980; 1983; 1987; 1991; 1993; 1995; 1997; 1999; 2001; 2003; 2005; 2007; 2009; 2011; 2013; 2015; 2017; 2019; 2022; 2023; 2025

The United States competed at the 2007 World Championships in Athletics.

== Events ==
Key

- Note–Ranks given for track events are within the athlete's heat only
- Q = Qualified for the next round
- q = Qualified for the next round as a fastest loser or, in field events, by position without achieving the qualifying target
- Bye = Athlete not required to compete in round

=== Men ===
==== Track and road events ====
Event	Athletes	Heats		Quarterfinal		Semifinal		Final	
Event	Athletes	Result	Rank	Result	Rank	Result	Rank	Result	Rank
100 m	Tyson Gay	10.19	2 Q	10.06	1 Q	10.00	1 Q	9.85	1st place, gold medalist(s)
100 m	Mark Jelks	13.64	8	Did not advance					
100 m	J-Mee Samuels	10.39	4 q	10.29	5	Did not advance			
200 m	Tyson Gay	20.46	1 Q	20.08	1 Q	20.00	1 Q	19.76	1st place, gold medalist(s)
200 m	Rodney Martin	20.44	1 Q	20.25	1 Q	20.18 SB	3 Q	20.06	4
200 m	Wallace Spearmon	20.45	3 Q	20.26	2 Q	20.05	2 Q	20.05	3rd place, bronze medalist(s)
400 m	Lionel Larry	DNF		—N/a		Did not advance			
400 m	LaShawn Merritt	45.78	1 Q	—N/a		44.31	1 Q	43.96 PB	2nd place, silver medalist(s)
400 m	Angelo Taylor	45.13	2 Q	—N/a		44.45	1 Q	44.32	3rd place, bronze medalist(s)
400 m	Jeremy Wariner	45.10	1 Q	—N/a		44.33	1 Q	43.45 WL	1st place, gold medalist(s)
800 m	Khadevis Robinson	1:45.78	4 q	—N/a		1:45.45	4	Did not advance	
800 m	Nicholas Symmonds	1:46.16	2 Q	—N/a		1:46.41	6	Did not advance	
800 m	Duane Solomon	1:48.95	7	—N/a		Did not advance			
1500 m	Alan Webb	3:40.73	2 Q	—N/a		3:41.08	5 Q	3:35.69	8
1500 m	Leonel Manzano	3:45.97	13	—N/a		Did not advance			
1500 m	Bernard Lagat	3:41.68	3 Q	—N/a		3:42.39	1 Q	3:34.77	1st place, gold medalist(s)
5000 m	Bernard Lagat	13:46.57	3 Q	—N/a				13:45.87	1st place, gold medalist(s)
5000 m	Matt Tegenkamp	13:35.05	2 Q	—N/a				13:46.78	4
5000 m	Adam Goucher	13:41.65	8 q	—N/a				13:53.17	11
10.000 m	Abdi Abdirahman	—N/a						27:56.62	7
10.000 m	Galen Rupp	—N/a						28:41.71	11
10.000 m	Dathan Ritzenhein	—N/a						28:28.59	9
110 m hurdles	Terrence Trammell	13.40	1 Q	—N/a		13.23	1 Q	12.99	2nd place, silver medalist(s)
110 m hurdles	David Payne	13.27	2 Q	—N/a		13.19	1 Q	13.02 PB	3rd place, bronze medalist(s)
110 m hurdles	David Oliver	13.66	5 q	—N/a		13.42	4	Did not advance	
400 m hurdles	Bershawn Jackson	48.87	2 Q	—N/a		48.95	3	Did not advance	
400 m hurdles	James Carter	49.52	1 Q	—N/a		48.30	2 Q	48.40	4
400 m hurdles	Kerron Clement	49.07	1 Q	—N/a		48.60	1 Q	47.71 WL	1st place, gold medalist(s)
400 m hurdles	Derrick Williams	49.65	1 Q	—N/a		48.43	4 q	52.97	7
3000 m steeplechase	Joshua McAdams	8:32.46	5	—N/a				Did not advance	
3000 m steeplechase	Aaron Aguayo	8:30.86	10	—N/a				Did not advance	
3000 m steeplechase	Thomas Brooks	8:56.20	11	—N/a				Did not advance	
4 × 100 m relay	Tyson Gay; Mark Jelks; J-Mee Samuels; LeRoy Dixon; Darvis Patton; Leonard Scott	38.10	2 Q	—N/a				37.78	1st place, gold medalist(s)
4 × 100 m relay	Jeremy Wariner; Angelo Taylor; LaShawn Merritt; Lionel Larry; Darold Williamson; Jamaal Torrance	3:01.46	1 Q	—N/a				2:55.56	1st place, gold medalist(s)
Marathon	Mbarak Hussein	—N/a						2:23:04 SB	21
Marathon	Simeon Sawe	—N/a						DNS	
Marathon	Fernando Cabada	—N/a						2:35:48 SB	50
Marathon	Mike Morgan	—N/a						2:23:28 SB	23
Marathon	Kyle O'Brien	—N/a						2:28:28 SB	32
20 km walk	Kevin Eastler	—N/a						1:28:29	28
20 km walk	Timothy Seaman	—N/a						1:33:58	31
50 km walk	Kevin Eastler	—N/a						4:31:52	31

==== Field events ====
Event	Athletes	Qualification		Final	
Event	Athletes	Result	Rank	Result	Rank
High Jump	Jim Dilling	2.19	34	Did not advance	
High Jump	Jamie Nieto	2.26	16	Did not advance	
High Jump	Jesse Williams	2.23	26	Did not advance	
Pole Vault	Brad Walker	5.70	7 q	5.86	1st place, gold medalist(s)
Pole Vault	Jeff Hartwig	5.55	15	Did not advance	
Pole Vault	Jacob Pauli	5.55	15	Did not advance	
Long Jump	Dwight Phillips	8.22	2 Q	8.30	3rd place, bronze medalist(s)
Long Jump	Miguel Pate	8.10	q	7.94	10
Long Jump	Trevell Quinley	7.99	q	NM	
Triple Jump	Walter Davis	17.10	3	17.33	3rd place, bronze medalist(s)
Triple Jump	Aarik Wilson	17.06	2	17.31	5
Triple Jump	Lawrence Willis	16.55	8	Did not advance	
Triple Jump	Kenta Bell	16.22	15	Did not advance	
Shot Put	Adam Nelson	20.81	3 Q	21.61 SB	2nd place, silver medalist(s)
Shot Put	Reese Hoffa	20.89	2 Q	22.04	1st place, gold medalist(s)
Shot Put	Dan Taylor	18.45	33	Did not advance	
Shot Put	Noah Bryant	18.58	28	Did not advance	
Discus throw	Michael Robertson	60.39	20	Did not advance	
Discus throw	Ian Waltz	62.67	13	Did not advance	
Discus throw	Jarred Rome	61.87	15	Did not advance	
Hammer throw	A. G. Kruger	73.19	17	Did not advance	
Hammer throw	Kidwe Johnson	NM		Did not advance	
Javelin throw	Breaux Greer	86.78	1Q	86.21	3rd place, bronze medalist(s)
Javelin throw	Eric Brown	73.07	30	Did not advance	

==== Decathlon ====
Bryan Clay	Decathlon			
Bryan Clay	Event	Results	Points	Rank
	100 m	10.44	989	1
	Long jump	7.65	972	1
	Shot put	15.51	821	?
	High jump	1.97	776	?
	400 m	-	-	-
	110 m hurdles	-	-	-
	Discus throw	-	-	-
	Pole vault	-	-	-
	Javelin throw	-	-	-
	1500 m	-	-	-
Total			DNF	

Tom Pappas	Decathlon			
Tom Pappas	Event	Results	Points	Rank
	100 m	10.96	870	?
	Long jump	7.44	920	?
	Shot put	16.31	870	?
	High jump	2.03	831	?
	400 m	49.22	851	?
	110 m hurdles	14.84	869	?
	Discus throw	-	-	-
	Pole vault	-	-	-
	Javelin throw	-	-	-
	1500 m	-	-	-
Total			DNF	

Paul Terek	Decathlon			
Paul Terek	Event	Results	Points	Rank
	100 m			
	Long jump			
	Shot put			
	High jump			
	400 m			
	110 m hurdles			
	Discus throw			
	Pole vault			
	Javelin throw			
	1500 m			
Total				

Jake Arnold	Decathlon			
Jake Arnold	Event	Results	Points	Rank
	100 m			
	Long jump			
	Shot put			
	High jump			
	400 m			
	110 m hurdles			
	Discus throw			
	Pole vault			
	Javelin throw			
	1500 m			
Total				

=== Women ===
==== Track and road events ====
Event	Athletes	Heats		Quarterfinal		Semifinal		Final	
Event	Athletes	Result	Rank	Result	Rank	Result	Rank	Result	Rank
100 m	Lauryn Williams	11.41	2 Q	11.16	2 Q	11.09 SB	2 Q	11.01	2nd place, silver medalist(s)
100 m	Torri Edwards	11.14	1 Q	11.13	1 Q	11.02	1 Q	11.05	4
100 m	Carmelita Jeter	11.07	1 Q	11.17	3 Q	11.08	4 Q	11.02	3rd place, bronze medalist(s)
100 m	Mechelle Lewis	11.16	1 Q	11.25	3 Q	11.16	5	Did not advance	
200 m	Allyson Felix	22.50	1 Q	22.61	1 Q	22.21	1 Q	21.21 WL	1st place, gold medalist(s)
200 m	Sanya Richards	22.74	1 Q	22.31	1 Q	22.50	1 Q	22.70	5
200 m	Torri Edwards	22.90	2 Q	22.62	2 Q	22.51 SB	3 Q	22.65	4
200 m	LaShauntea Moore	22.93	1 Q	22.71	2 Q	22.73	4 Q	22.97	7
400 m	De'Hashia Trotter	51.27	1 Q	—N/a		50.31	3 q	50.17	5
400 m	Natasha Hastings	51.07	3 Q	—N/a		51.45	7	Did not advance	
400 m	Mary Wineberg	51.25	2 Q	—N/a		50.27	2 Q	50.96	8
800 m	Alysia Johnson	2:02.11	4	—N/a		Did not advance			
800 m	Hazel Clark	2:00.61	5 q	—N/a		2:02.92	8	Did not advance	
800 m	Alice Schmidt	2:02.49	5	—N/a		Did not advance			
1500 m	Treniere Clement	4:10.85	3 Q	—N/a		4:08.32	9	Did not advance	
1500 m	Christin Wurth	4:20.21	11	—N/a		Did not advance			
1500 m	Erin Donohue	4:10.89	4 Q	—N/a		4:16.41	8	Did not advance	
5000 m	Shalane Flanagan	15:07.47	5 Q	—N/a				15:03.86	8
5000 m	Jennifer Rhines	15:14.30	5 Q	—N/a				15:03.09	7
5000 m	Michelle Sikes	15:54.06	9	—N/a				Did not advance	
10,000 m	Deena Kastor	—N/a						32:24.58	6
10,000 m	Kara Goucher	—N/a						32:02.05	3rd place, bronze medalist(s)
10,000 m	Katie McGregor	—N/a						32:44.76	13
100 m hurdles	Michelle Perry	12.72	1 Q	—N/a		12.55	1 Q	12.46	1st place, gold medalist(s)
100 m hurdles	Virginia Powell	12.76	2 Q	—N/a		12.67	4 Q	12.55	6
100 m hurdles	Lolo Jones	12.86	1 Q	—N/a		12.68	4 Q	12.62	6
100 m hurdles	Nichole Denby	12.91	3 Q	—N/a		12.80 SB	5	Did not advance	
400 m hurdles	Tiffany Williams	54.24	1 Q	—N/a		54.15	3 q	54.63	7
400 m hurdles	Sheena Johnson	56.30	3 Q	—N/a		54.55	5	Did not advance	
400 m hurdles	Nicole Leach	56.95	4 Q	—N/a		56.10	6	Did not advance	
3000 m steeplechase	Jennifer Simpson	9:51.04	7	—N/a				Did not advance	
3000 m steeplechase	Anna Willard	9:48.62	8	—N/a				Did not advance	
3000 m steeplechase	Lindsey Anderson	9:57.00	10	—N/a				Did not advance	
4 × 100 m relay	Torri Edwards; Lauryn Williams; Carmelita Jeter*; Allyson Felix; Mechelle Lewis*; Mikele Barber	42.24 WL	1 Q	—N/a				41.98 WL	1st place, gold medalist(s)
4 × 100 m relay	De'Hashia Trotter; Natasha Hastings*; Mary Wineberg; Sanya Richards; Monique Hennagan*; Me'Lisa Barber	3:23.37 WL	1 Q	—N/a				3:18.55 WL	1st place, gold medalist(s)
Marathon	Mary Akor	—N/a						2:47:06	42
Marathon	Zoila Gomez	—N/a						2:44:49	35
Marathon	Ann Alyanak	—N/a						2:42:23	31
Marathon	Samia Akbar	—N/a						2:56:27 SB	49
Marathon	Dana Coons	—N/a						2:46:12 SB	38
20 km walk	Teresa Vaill	—N/a						DQ	

==== Field events ====
Event	Athletes	Qualification		Final	
Event	Athletes	Result	Rank	Result	Rank
High Jump	Amy Acuff	1.94	9 Q	1.94	12
High Jump	Erin Aldrich	1.88	24	Did not advance	
Pole Vault	Jennifer Stuczynski	4.55	1 Q	4.50	10
Pole Vault	Nikole McEwen	4.35	17	Did not advance	
Pole Vault	Jillian Schwartz	4.50 SB	15	Did not advance	
Long Jump	Tianna Madison	6.59	12 q	6.47	10
Long Jump	Grace Upshaw	6.47	19	Did not advance	
Long Jump	Brittney Reese	6.83	6 Q	6.60	8
Long Jump	Rose Richmond	6.45	22	Did not advance	
Triple Jump	Shani Marks	13.90	18	Did not advance	
Shot Put	Kristin Heaston	17.40	17	Did not advance	
Shot Put	Jillian Camarena	16.95	21	Did not advance	
Shot Put	Sarah Stevens	16.87	22	Did not advance	
Discus throw	Suzy Powell	59.57	15	Did not advance	
Discus throw	Rebecca Breisch	58.42	19	Did not advance	
Discus throw	Cecilia Barnes	53.02	26	Did not advance	
Hammer throw	Brittany Riley	55.72	38	Did not advance	
Hammer throw	Kristal Yush	64.63	26	Did not advance	
Hammer throw	Jessica Cosby	67.90	15	Did not advance	
Javelin throw	Dana Pounds	55.00	26	Did not advance	

==== Heptathlon ====
Hyleas Fountain	Heptathlon			
Hyleas Fountain	Event	Results	Points	Rank
	100 m hurdles			
	High jump			
	Shot put			
	200 m			
	Long jump			
	Javelin throw			
	800 m			
Total				

Diana Pickler	Heptathlon			
Diana Pickler	Event	Results	Points	Rank
	100 m hurdles			
	High jump			
	Shot put			
	200 m			
	Long jump			
	Javelin throw			
	800 m			
Total				

Virginia Johnson	Heptathlon			
Virginia Johnson	Event	Results	Points	Rank
	100 m hurdles			
	High jump			
	Shot put			
	200 m			
	Long jump			
	Javelin throw			
	800 m			
Total				
