= Athletics at the 2008 Summer Olympics – Women's heptathlon =

Women's heptathlon at the Games of the XXIX Olympiad
- Venue: Beijing National Stadium
- Dates: August 15–16
- Competitors: 43 from 28 nations
- Winning points: 6733

Medalists
1st place, gold medalist(s)		Nataliya Dobrynska	Ukraine
2nd place, silver medalist(s)		Hyleas Fountain	United States
3rd place, bronze medalist(s)		Kelly Sotherton	Great Britain

The women's heptathlon at the 2008 Summer Olympics took place between August 15 and 16 at the Beijing National Stadium.

The qualifying standards were 6,000 points (A standard) and 5,800 points (B standard).

== Schedule ==
All times are China standard time (UTC+8)

Date	Time	Round
Friday, 15 August 2008	9:00; 10:30; 19:00; 21:30	100 metres hurdles High jump Shot put 200 metres
Saturday, 16 August 2008	09:50; 19:00; 21:35	Long jump Javelin throw 800 metres

== Records ==
Prior to this competition, the existing world and Olympic records were as follows:

World record	Jackie Joyner-Kersee (USA)	7291 points	Seoul, South Korea	24 September 1988
Olympic record	Jackie Joyner-Kersee (USA)	7291 points	Seoul, South Korea	24 September 1988

No new world or Olympic records were set for this event.

== Overall results ==
Key

The highest mark recorded in each event is highlighted in yellow

Rank	Athlete	Country	Overall points	100 m H	HJ	SP	200 m	LJ	JT	800 m
1st place, gold medalist(s)	Nataliya Dobrynska	Ukraine	6733 (PB)	1059; 13.44 s	978; 1.80 m	1015; 17.29 m	944; 24.39 s	1049; 6.63 m	833; 48.60 m	855; 2:17.72 min
2nd place, silver medalist(s)	Hyleas Fountain	United States	6619	1158; 12.78 s	1093; 1.89 m	751; 13.36 m	1058; 23.21 s	969; 6.38 m	704; 41.93 m	886; 2:15.45 min
3rd place, bronze medalist(s)	Kelly Sotherton	Great Britain	6517	1097; 13.18 s	1016; 1.83 m	785; 13.87 m	1040; 23.39 s	953; 6.33 m	622; 37.66 m	1004; 2:07.34 min
4	Jessica Zelinka	Canada	6490 (NR)	1129; 12.97 s	941; 1.77 m	780; 13.79 m	1016; 23.64 s	887; 6.12 m	742; 43.91 m	995; 2:07.95 min
5	Anna Bogdanova	Russia	6465 (PB)	1111; 13.09 s	1054; 1.86 m	799; 14.08 m	958; 24.24 s	991; 6.45 m	579; 35.41 m	973; 2:09.45 min
6	Karolina Tyminska	Poland	6428 (PB)	1033; 13.62 s	941; 1.77 m	799; 14.08 m	1040; 23.39 s	1017; 6.53 m	590; 35.97 m	1008; 2:07.08 min
7	Lilli Schwarzkopf	Germany	6379	1017; 13.73 s	978; 1.80 m	835; 14.61 m	885; 25.02 s	837; 5.96 m	897; 51.88 m	951; 2:10.91 min
8	Jolanda Keizer	Netherlands	6370 (PB)	993; 13.90 s	1016; 1.83 m	871; 15.15 m	984; 23.97 s	896; 6.15 m	720; 42.76 m	890; 2:15.21 min
9	Kylie Wheeler	Australia	6369 (PB)	1024; 13.68 s	1093; 1.89 m	731; 13.06 m	954; 24.28 s	883; 6.11 m	741; 43.81 m	943; 2:11.49 min
10	Jennifer Oeser	Germany	6360	1040; 13.57 s	978; 1.80 m	769; 13.62 m	917; 24.67 s	899; 6.16 m	812; 47.53 m	945; 2:11.33 min
11	Marie Collonvillé	France	6302 (SB)	1040; 13.57 s	1054; 1.86 m	689; 12.42 m	881; 25.06 s	915; 6.21 m	785; 46.14 m	938; 2:11.81 min
12	Olga Kurban	Russia	6192	1011; 13.77 s	941; 1.77 m	783; 13.84 m	948; 24.34 s	874; 6.08 m	722; 42.85 m	913; 2:13.59 min
13	Hanna Melnychenko	Ukraine	6165	1047; 13.52 s	978; 1.80 m	739; 13.18 m	947; 24.35 s	975; 6.40 m	589; 35.89 m	890; 2:15.23 min
14	Kamila Chudzik	Poland	6157	1008; 13.79 s	941; 1.77 m	817; 14.34 m	854; 25.36 s	840; 5.97 m	900; 52.05 m	797; 2:21.97 min
15	Sonja Kesselschlager	Germany	6140	1050; 13.50 s	941; 1.77 m	816; 14.33 m	841; 25.50 s	862; 6.04 m	750; 44.28 m	880; 2:15.94 min
16	Lucimara da Silva	Brazil	6076	1043; 13.55 s	1016; 1.83 m	634; 11.59 m	928; 24.56 s	905; 6.18 m	674; 40.34 m	876; 2:16.20 min
17	Antoinette Nana Djimou Ida	France	6055	1000; 13.85 s	867; 1.71 m	735; 13.12 m	896; 24.90 s	899; 6.16 m	847; 49.32 m	811; 2:20.96 min
18	Aiga Grabuste	Latvia	6050 (PB)	1010; 13.78 s	941; 1.77 m	707; 12.70 m	914; 24.71 s	962; 6.36 m	649; 39.02 m	867; 2:16.87 min
19	Liu Haili	China	6041 (PB)	1041; 13.56 s	941; 1.77 m	708; 12.71 m	936; 24.47 s	874; 6.08 m	702; 41.79 m	839; 2:18.84 min
20	Ida Marcussen	Norway	6015	968; 14.07 s	867; 1.71 m	725; 12.97 m	885; 25.02 s	868; 6.06 m	809; 47.37 m	893; 2:14.96 min
21	Rebecca Wardell	New Zealand	5989	968; 14.07 s	867; 1.71 m	813; 14.28 m	920; 24.64 s	801; 5.84 m	708; 42.14 m	912; 2:13.65 min
22	Niina Kelo	Finland	5911 (SB)	985; 13.95 s	795; 1.65 m	849; 14.82 m	806; 25.90 s	777; 5.76 m	889; 51.48 m	810; 2:20.97 min
23	Argyro Strataki	Greece	5893	971; 14.05 s	830; 1.68 m	742; 13.22 m	844; 25.47 s	840; 5.97 m	767; 45.20 m	899; 2:14.57 min
24	Gretchen Quintana	Cuba	5830	1011; 13.77 s	830; 1.68 m	734; 13.10 m	948; 24.34 s	856; 6.02 m	632; 38.14 m	819; 2:20.31 min
25	Yuliya Tarasova	Uzbekistan	5785	974; 14.03 s	867; 1.71 m	701; 12.60 m	946; 24.36 s	825; 5.92 m	731; 43.31 m	741; 2:26.19 min
26	Pramila Aiyappa	India	5771	983; 13.97 s	903; 1.74 m	639; 11.66 m	894; 24.92 s	883; 6.11 m	692; 41.27 m	777; 2:23.46 min
27	Györgyi Farkas	Hungary	5760	887; 14.66 s	903; 1.74 m	665; 12.06 m	788; 26.10 s	877; 6.09 m	734; 43.45 m	906; 2:14.05 min
28	Shobha Javur	India	5749	1033; 13.62 s	795; 1.65 m	732; 13.07 m	922; 24.62 s	807; 5.86 m	735; 43.50 m	725; 2:27.50 min
29	Linda Züblin	Switzerland	5743	993; 13.90 s	759; 1.62 m	684; 12.34 m	888; 24.99 s	771; 5.74 m	806; 47.19 m	842; 2:18.68 min
30	Julie Hollman	Great Britain	5729	918; 14.43 s	941; 1.77 m	691; 12.45 m	850; 25.41 s	890; 6.13 m	650; 39.08 m	789; 2:22.54 min
31	Susmita Singha Roy	India	5705	963; 14.11 s	867; 1.71 m	613; 11.27 m	948; 24.34 s	843; 5.98 m	663; 39.79 m	808; 2:21.14 min
32	Kaie Kand	Estonia	5677 (SB)	913; 14.47 s	795; 1.65 m	721; 12.91 m	844; 25.47 s	774; 5.75 m	716; 42.51 m	916; 2:13.36 min
33	Yana Maksimava	Belarus	4806	880; 14.71 s	903; 1.74 m	767; 13.60 m	802; 25.94 s	0 NM	651; 39.14 m	803; 2:21.55 min
—	Laurien Hoos	Netherlands	DNF	1047; 13.52 s	795; 1.65 m	860; 14.98 m	927; 24.57 s	771; 5.74 m	832; 48.54 m	DNS
—	Jackie Johnson	United States	DNF	1091; 13.22 s	941; 1.77 m	649; 11.82 m	911; 24.74 s	813; 5.88 m	DNS	DNS
—	Viktorija Žemaitytė	Lithuania	DNF	917; 14.44 s	903; 1.74 m	795; 14.01 m	881; 25.06 s	0 NM	DNS	DNS
—	Austra Skujytė	Lithuania	DNF	914; 14.46 s	941; 1.77 m	997; 17.02 m	850; 25.40 s	0 NM	DNS	DNS
—	Wassana Winatho	Thailand	DNF	988; 13.93 s	830; 1.68 m	DNS	DNS	DNS	DNS	DNS
—	Denisa Ščerbová	Czech Republic	DNF	995; 13.88 s	795; 1.65 m	DNS	DNS	DNS	DNS	DNS
—	Diana Pickler	United States	DNF	939; 14.28 s	DNS	DNS	DNS	DNS	DNS	DNS
—	Irina Naumenko	Kazakhstan	DNF	0 DNF	DNS	DNS	DNS	DNS	DNS	DNS
DSQ	Lyudmila Blonska	Ukraine	~~6700~~*	~~1078~~; 13.31 s	~~1054~~; 1.86 m	~~813~~; 14.29 m	~~967~~; 24.14 s	~~1001~~; 6.48 m	~~814~~; 47.60 m	~~973~~; 2:09.44 min
DSQ	Tatyana Chernova	Russia	~~6591~~*	~~1028~~; 13.65 s	~~1016~~; 1.83 m	~~719~~; 12.88 m	~~986~~; 23.95 s	~~997~~; 6.47 m	~~829~~; 48.37 m	~~1016~~; 2:06.50 min

* Ukraine's Lyudmila Blonska originally won the silver medal, but was disqualified after she tested positive for methyltestosterone. Russia's Tatyana Chernova, who inherited the bronze medal following Blonska's disqualification was herself disqualified after a retest of her 2008 drug sample was found to contain metabolites of turinabol.
