= United States at the 2009 World Championships in Athletics =

- WA code: USA
- National federation: USA Track & Field
- Website: www.usatf.org

in Berlin
- Competitors: 160
- Medals Ranked 1st: Gold 10 Silver 6 Bronze 6 Total 22

World Championships in Athletics appearances (overview)
- 1976; 1980; 1983; 1987; 1991; 1993; 1995; 1997; 1999; 2001; 2003; 2005; 2007; 2009; 2011; 2013; 2015; 2017; 2019; 2022; 2023; 2025

United States competed at the 2009 World Championships in Athletics in Berlin. A team of over 100 athletes was announced in preparation for the competition. Team USA athletes honoured Jesse Owens' memory by displaying the letters JO on their competition singlets. Selected athletes achieved one of the competition's qualifying standards. The squad included reigning champions, such as: Tyson Gay, Allyson Felix, Michelle Perry, Reese Hoffa, Dwight Phillips, Brad Walker, Bernard Lagat, Kerron Clement, and Jeremy Wariner. Furthermore, outside the reigning champions, there were a number of past medallists and world leaders in the squad. With such strength in depth in a large squad, the United States was expected to maintain its dominance of the competition, in which it has not been beaten on total gold medals since 1987. Olympic champion Bryan Clay missed the competition due to injury.

The United States team again topped the medals table; its total of 10 gold medals was almost equal to that of second and third place's totals combined.

== Team selection ==
Track and road events

Event	Athletes	
Event	Men	Women
100 meters	Tyson Gay; Michael Rodgers; Darvis Patton; Monzavous Edwards	Carmelita Jeter; Muna Lee; Lauryn Williams
200 meters	Tyson Gay; Shawn Crawford; Charles Clark; Wallace Spearmon	Allyson Felix; Muna Lee; Marshevet Hooker; Charonda Williams
400 meters	Jeremy Wariner; LaShawn Merritt; Gil Roberts; Lionel Larry	Sanya Richards; Debbie Dunn; Jessica Beard
800 meters	Nick Symmonds; Khadevis Robinson; Ryan Brown	Hazel Clark; Geena Gall; Maggie Vessey
1500 meters	Bernard Lagat; Lopez Lomong; Leonel Manzano; Dorian Ulrey	Shannon Rowbury; Christin Wurth-Thomas; Anna Willard
5000 meters	Bernard Lagat; Matt Tegenkamp; Chris Solinsky; Evan Jager	Jen Rhines; Julie Culley
10,000 meters	Galen Rupp; Dathan Ritzenhein; Tim Nelson	Amy Yoder Begley; Shalane Flanagan; Katie McGregor
Marathon	Dan Browne; Nate Jenkins; Justin Young; Matt Gabrielson; Edwardo Torres	Kara Goucher; Desiree Davila; Paige Higgins; Zoila Gomez; Tera Moody
100 meter hurdles	—	Michelle Perry; Dawn Harper; Ginnie Powell; Damu Cherry
110 meter hurdles	David Payne; Terrence Trammell; Aries Merritt	—
400 meter hurdles	Kerron Clement; Bershawn Jackson; Johnny Dutch; Angelo Taylor	Lashinda Demus; Sheena Tosta; Tiffany Ross-Williams
3000 m steeplechase	Joshua McAdams; Dan Huling; Kyle Alcorn	Jennifer Simpson; Bridget Franek; Lindsey Anderson
20 km race walk		Teresa Vaill
50 km race walk		—
4×100 meter relay	Tyson Gay; Michael Rodgers; Darvis Patton; Monzavous Edwards; Travis Padgett; Shawn Crawford; Terrence Trammell; Wallace Spearmon	Carmelita Jeter; Muna Lee; Lauryn Williams; Alexandria Anderson; Jessica Young; Shalonda Solomon; Marshevet Hooker; Charonda Williams; Allyson Felix
4×400 meter relay	Jeremy Wariner; LaShawn Merritt; Gil Roberts; Lionel Larry; David Neville; Kerron Clement; Bershawn Jackson; Angelo Taylor	Sanya Richards; Debbie Dunn; Jessica Beard; Natasha Hastings; Lashinda Demus; Allyson Felix

Field and combined events

Event	Athletes	
Event	Men	Women
Pole vault	Brad Walker; Jeremy Scott; Derek Miles; Toby Stevenson	Jenn Stuczynski; Chelsea Johnson; Stacy Dragila
High jump	Tora Harris; Andra Manson; Keith Moffatt	Chaunte Howard; Amy Acuff; Sharon Day
Long jump	Dwight Phillips; Brian Johnson; Miguel Pate	Brittney Reese; Brianna Glenn; Funmi Jimoh
Triple jump	Brandon Roulhac; Walter Davis; Kenta Bell	Shakeema Welsch; Erica McLain; Shani Marks
Shot put	Reese Hoffa; Christian Cantwell; Dan Taylor; Adam Nelson	Michelle Carter; Jillian Camarena; Kristin Heaston
Discus throw	Casey Malone; Jarred Rome; Ian Waltz	Stephanie Brown Trafton; Aretha Thurmond; Becky Breisch
Hammer throw	A.G. Kruger; Jake Freeman; Michael Mai	Jessica Cosby; Amber Campbell; Erin Gilreath
Javelin throw	Chris Hill; Mike Hazle; Sean Furey	Kara Patterson; Rachel Yurkovic
Heptathlon	—	Diana Pickler; Sharon Day; Bettie Wade
Decathlon	Trey Hardee; Ashton Eaton; Jake Arnold	—
