= Lilli Schwarzkopf =

German heptathlete

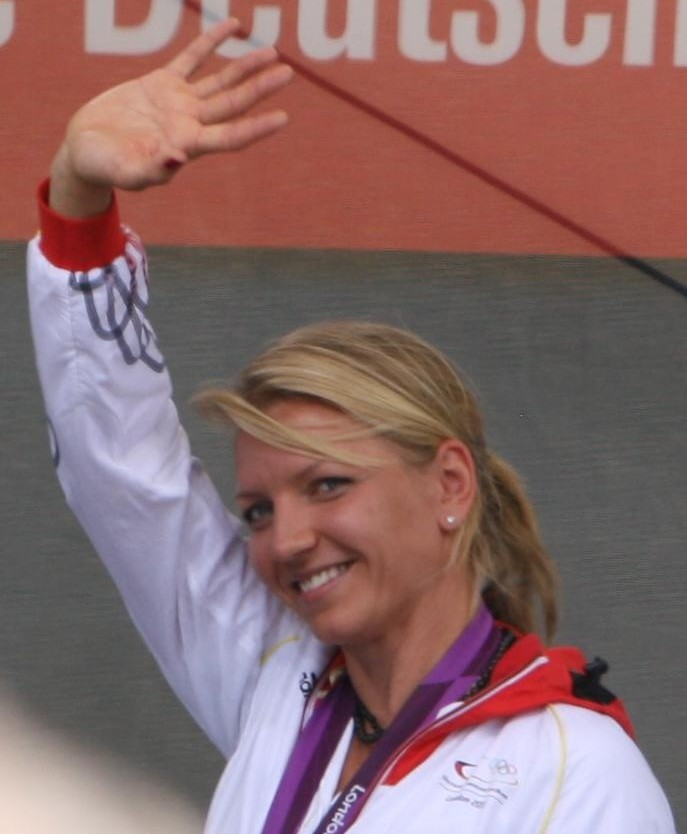
- Schwarzkopf in Hamburg, 2012.

Personal information
- Full name: Lilli Schwarzkopf
- Born: 28 August 1983 (age 43) Novopokrovka, Kirghiz SSR, Soviet Union
- Height: 1.73 m (5 ft 8 in)
- Weight: 65 kg (143 lb)
- Website: lilli-schwarzkopf.de

Sport
- Country: Germany
- Sport: Athletics
- Event: Heptathlon

Achievements and titles
- Personal bests: 200 m: 24.72 (July 2011); 800 m: 2:09.63 (June 2006); 100 m hurdles: 13.26 (August 2012); High jump: 1.84 (June 2014); Long jump: 6.34 (June 2007); Shot put: 14.89 (August 2011); Javelin: 55.25 (June 2009); Heptathlon: 6649 (August 2012)
Medal record
Heptathlon
Representing Germany
Olympic Games
Silver medal – second place	2012 London	Heptathlon
European Championships
Bronze medal – third place	2006 Gothenburg	Heptathlon

Lilli Schwarzkopf (born 28 August 1983 in Novopokrovka, Kirghiz SSR) is a German heptathlete.

Her first major global competition was the 2005 World Championships in Athletics, where she finished in 13th place. She won the bronze medal at the 2006 European Athletics Championships in Gothenburg. She followed this up on the world stage with a fifth-place finish at the 2007 World Championships and eighth place at the 2008 Summer Olympics. She failed to finish the heptathlon at the 2009 World Championships in Athletics in Berlin and chose to omit the 2010 European Athletics Championships to focus on her studies but came back to place sixth at the 2011 World Championships in Daegu.

Schwarzkopf won the silver medal in the heptathlon at the 2012 Summer Olympics. Initially after the 800 metres, Schwarzkopf was disqualified for breaking lane, but this later turned out to be a mistake, Kristina Savitskaya in the neighbouring lane having done so, and Schwarzkopf was re-instated.
