= Jessica Samuelsson =

Jessica Samuelsson may refer to:

- Jessica Samuelsson (heptathlete) (born 1985), Swedish heptathlete
- Jessica Samuelsson (footballer) (born 1992), Swedish footballer
