= 2007 European Athletics U23 Championships – Women's heptathlon =

The women's heptathlon event at the 2007 European Athletics U23 Championships was held in Debrecen, Hungary, at Gyulai István Atlétikai Stadion on 14 and 15 July.

== Medalists ==
Gold	Viktorija Žemaitytė; Lithuania
Silver	Jolanda Keizer; Netherlands
Bronze	Julia Mächtig; Germany

== Results ==
=== Final ===
14-15 July

The highest mark recorded in each event is highlighted in yellow

Rank	Name	Nationality	100m H	HJ	SP	200m	LJ	JT	800m	Points	Notes
1st place, gold medalist(s)	Viktorija Žemaitytė	Lithuania	14.06 (w: -0.5 m/s)	1.85	13.70	24.67 (w: -0.1 m/s)	5.86 (w: -0.5 m/s)	49.24	2:16.99	6219	
2nd place, silver medalist(s)	Jolanda Keizer	Netherlands	14.03 (w: -0.5 m/s)	1.76	14.50	24.88 (w: -0.1 m/s)	6.39 w (w: 2.4 m/s)	44.94	2:17.47	6219	
3rd place, bronze medalist(s)	Julia Mächtig	Germany	14.40 (w: -0.5 m/s)	1.73	14.77	24.32 (w: -0.1 m/s)	6.39 (w: 1.1 m/s)	40.72	2:15.24	6151	
4	Kamila Chudzik	Poland	14.05 (w: -1.7 m/s)	1.76	13.76	25.20 (w: -0.6 m/s)	6.16 (w: 1.4 m/s)	49.51	2:21.69	6097	
5	Marina Goncharova	Russia	14.21 (w: 0.2 m/s)	1.64	13.91	25.05 (w: -0.8 m/s)	6.45 w (w: 2.2 m/s)	40.89	2:12.57	6004	
6	Bregje Crolla	Netherlands	14.38 (w: 0.2 m/s)	1.76	12.92	25.43 (w: -0.8 m/s)	5.48 (w: -0.4 m/s)	54.25	2:13.54	5973	
7	Antoinette Nana Djimou	France	14.01 (w: -1.7 m/s)	1.73	13.22	24.52 (w: -0.6 m/s)	5.88 (w: -0.1 m/s)	46.87	2:20.52	5970	
8	Ida Marcussen	Norway	14.48 (w: -0.5 m/s)	1.64	13.41	24.72 (w: -0.6 m/s)	5.98 (w: 0.1 m/s)	48.31	2:12.53	5961	
9	Maren Schwerdtner	Germany	13.91 (w: -1.7 m/s)	1.73	14.07	24.58 (w: -0.1 m/s)	5.83 (w: -0.3 m/s)	44.83	2:24.04	5934	
10	Blandine Maisonnier	France	14.23 (w: -1.7 m/s)	1.76	11.27	24.78 (w: -0.1 m/s)	6.50 w (w: 2.9 m/s)	35.39	2:13.52	5894	
11	Linda Züblin	Switzerland	14.07 (w: -1.7 m/s)	1.64	12.50	24.72 (w: -0.1 m/s)	6.18 (w: 1.7 m/s)	46.76	2:20.39	5878	
12	Marisa De Aniceto	France	14.18 (w: -1.7 m/s)	1.79	11.80	25.27 (w: -0.8 m/s)	5.70 (w: 1.5 m/s)	45.17	2:12.88	5878	
13	Jessica Samuelsson	Sweden	14.47 (w: -0.5 m/s)	1.70	14.30	24.67 (w: -0.6 m/s)	5.53 (w: 1.4 m/s)	37.58	2:12.25	5761	
14	Ulrike Hartz	Germany	14.34 (w: 0.2 m/s)	1.70	12.78	24.70 (w: -0.1 m/s)	5.90 (w: 2.0 m/s)	44.24	2:27.73	5704	
15	Cecilia Ricali	Italy	14.19 (w: -0.5 m/s)	1.76	11.12	25.44 (w: -0.8 m/s)	5.82 (w: 1.3 m/s)	36.90	2:11.98	5669	
16	Elisa Kirvesniemi	Finland	14.34 (w: 0.2 m/s)	1.61	12.15	25.48 (w: -0.8 m/s)	5.92 (w: -1.0 m/s)	38.06	2:12.83	5571	
17	Louise Hazel	United Kingdom	13.76 (w: -1.7 m/s)	1.67	11.85	24.87 (w: -0.6 m/s)	5.93 (w: 2.0 m/s)	32.65	DNF	4736	
18	Iryna Ilkevych	Ukraine	14.53 (w: 0.2 m/s)	1.76	11.15	24.99 (w: -0.6 m/s)	5.96 (w: 1.7 m/s)	32.86	DNF	4694	
	Kristín Birna Ólafsdóttir	Iceland	14.69 (w: 0.2 m/s)	1.64	11.00	26.22 (w: -0.8 m/s)	5.20 (w: -1.0 m/s)	NM		DNF	

== Participation ==
According to an unofficial count, 19 athletes from 14 countries participated in the event.

- Finland (1)
- France (3)
- Germany (3)
- Iceland (1)
- Italy (1)
- Lithuania (1)
- Netherlands (2)
- Norway (1)
- Poland (1)
- Russia (1)
- Sweden (1)
- Switzerland (1)
- Ukraine (1)
- United Kingdom (1)
