= 2009 European Athletics Indoor Championships – Women's pentathlon =

The Women's pentathlon event at the 2009 European Athletics Indoor Championships was held on March 6.

== Medalists ==
Gold	Silver	Bronze
Anna Bogdanova; Russia	Jolanda Keizer; Netherlands	Antoinette Nana Djimou Ida; France

== Results ==
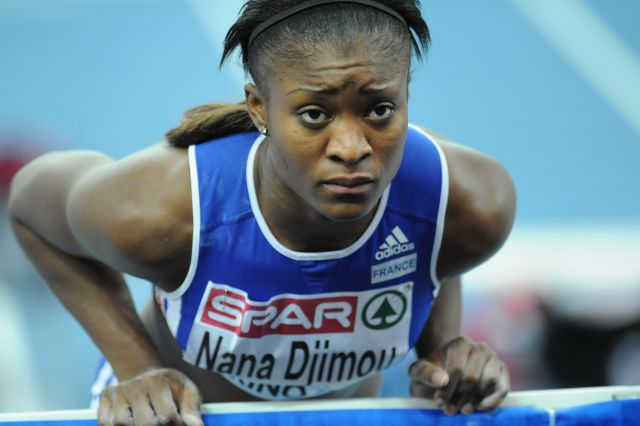
Antoinette Nana Djimou won the bronze medal for France.

The highest mark recorded in each event is highlighted in yellow

Rank	Athlete	Nationality	60m H	HJ	SP	LJ	800m	Points	Notes
1st place, gold medalist(s)	Anna Bogdanova	Russia	8.19	1.86	14.83	6.39	2:21.84	4761	
2nd place, silver medalist(s)	Jolanda Keizer	Netherlands	8.66	1.83	15.46	6.20	2:18.63	4644	PB
3rd place, bronze medalist(s)	Antoinette Nana Djimou Ida	France	8.38	1.77	14.16	6.44	2:18.80	4618	PB
4	Olga Kurban	Russia	8.31	1.74	14.07	6.14	2:12.95	4576	SB
5	Karolina Tymińska	Poland	8.62	1.71	14.25	6.22	2:10.69	4542	SB
6	Viktorija Žemaitytė	Lithuania	8.77	1.86	14.39	6.13	2:22.29	4516	PB
7	Christine Schulz	Germany	8.51	1.77	14.43	5.96	2:18.45	4461	
8	Yvonne Wisse	Netherlands	8.35	1.71	12.73	6.02	2:12.80	4406	
9	Francesca Doveri	Italy	8.43	1.71	12.24	6.24	2:15.62	4384	
10	Denisa Rosolová	Czech Republic	8.35	1.74	11.74	6.27	2:18.18	4379	SB
11	Kamila Chudzik	Poland	8.43	1.71	13.60	6.08	2:23.07	4322	SB
12	Sonja Kesselschläger	Germany	8.51	1.68	14.03	6.01	2:19.75	4321	SB
13	Kaie Kand	Estonia	8.56	1.80	13.04	NM	2:11.80	3650	
	Aiga Grabuste	Latvia	DNF	1.74	13.74	6.23	DNS	DNF	
	María Peinado	Spain	8.65	1.62	13.34	5.83	DNS	DNF	
