= Switzerland at the 2009 World Championships in Athletics =

- WA code: SUI

in Berlin
- Competitors: 11
- Medals: Gold 0 Silver 0 Bronze 0 Total 0

World Championships in Athletics appearances
- 1976; 1980; 1983; 1987; 1991; 1993; 1995; 1997; 1999; 2001; 2003; 2005; 2007; 2009; 2011; 2013; 2015; 2017; 2019; 2022; 2023; 2025

Switzerland compete at the 2009 World Championships in Athletics from 15–23 August. A team of 11 athletes was announced for the competition.

== Team selection ==
Track and road events

Event	Athletes	
Event	Men	Women
100 metres	Cédric Nabe Mongha	
200 metres	Marco Cribari; Marc Schneeberger	
400 metres		
800 metres		
1500 metres		
5000 metres		
10000 metres		
Marathon		Patricia Morceli-Bieri
100 metres hurdles	—	Lisa Urech
110 metres hurdles		—
400 metres hurdles		
3000 m steeplechase		
20 km race walk		Marie Polli
50 km race walk		—
4×100 metres relay		
4×400 metres relay		

Field and combined events

Event	Athletes	
Event	Men	Women
Pole vault		Nicole Büchler
High jump		
Long jump		
Triple jump		
Shot put		
Discus throw	Daniel Schärer	
Hammer throw		
Javelin throw	Stefan Müller	
Heptathlon	—	Linda Züblin
Decathlon	Simon Walter	—

== Results ==
=== Men ===
Track and road events

Event	Athletes	Heat Round 1		Heat Round 2		Semifinal		Final	
Event	Athletes	Result	Rank	Result	Rank	Result	Rank	Result	Rank
100 m	Cédric Nabe	10.51	51	did not advance					
200 m	Marco Cribari	20.80	14 Q	20.81	21	did not advance			
200 m	Marc Schneeberger	20.76	13 Q	20.91	24	did not advance			

Field events

Event	Athletes	Qualification		Final	
Event	Athletes	Result	Rank	Result	Rank
Discus throw	Daniel Schärer	58.50	27	did not advance	
Javelin throw	Stefan Müller	72.83	35	did not advance	
Decathlon	Simon Walter			7649	30

=== Women ===
Track and road events

Event	Athletes	Heat Round 1		Heat Round 2		Semifinal		Final	
Event	Athletes	Result	Rank	Result	Rank	Result	Rank	Result	Rank
100 m hurdles	Lisa Urech	13.36	28			did not advance			
Marathon	Patricia Morceli-Bieri							2:39:37	37
20 kilometres walk	Marie Polli							1:36:44	25

Field and combined events

Event	Athletes	Qualification		Final	
Event	Athletes	Result	Rank	Result	Rank
Pole vault	Nicole Büchler	4.50 NR	15	did not advance	
Heptathlon	Linda Züblin			5934	16
