= 2007 European Athletics Indoor Championships – Women's pentathlon =

The Women's pentathlon event at the 2007 European Athletics Indoor Championships was held on March 2.

== Medalists ==
Gold	Silver	Bronze
Carolina Klüft; Sweden	Kelly Sotherton; Great Britain	Karin Ruckstuhl; Netherlands

== Results ==
The highest mark recorded in each event is highlighted in yellow

Rank	Athlete	Nationality	60m H	HJ	SP	LJ	800m	Points	Notes
1st place, gold medalist(s)	Carolina Klüft	Sweden	8.20	1.88	14.43	6.59	2:13.04	4944	SB
2nd place, silver medalist(s)	Kelly Sotherton	Great Britain	8.23	1.88	14.57	6.51	2:12.54	4927	NR
3rd place, bronze medalist(s)	Karin Ruckstuhl	Netherlands	8.30	1.88	13.83	6.50	2:16.65	4801	NR
4	Austra Skujytė	Lithuania	8.82	1.85	16.48	6.21	2:16.21	4740	NR
5	Nataliya Dobrynska	Ukraine	8.49	1.85	15.76	6.23	2:18.37	4739	NR
6	Jessica Ennis	Great Britain	8.22	1.91	13.28	6.19	2:17.03	4716	PB
7	Karolina Tymińska	Poland	8.73	1.70	14.19	6.27	2:12.31	4494	SB
8	Aryiro Strataki	Greece	8.53	1.76	14.05	5.96	2:16.64	4442	
9	Julia Mächtig	Germany	8.87	1.73	13.89	6.28	2:17.18	4414	
10	Hanna Melnychenko	Ukraine	8.45	1.82	12.12	6.23	2:23.52	4397	
11	Antoinette Nana Djimou	France	8.33	1.76	14.30	5.86	2:25.44	4355	PB
12	Olga Levenkova	Russia	8.64	1.76	12.81	5.98	2:18.51	4317	
13	Anna Bogdanova	Russia	8.71	1.85	13.16	5.92	2:29.66	4272	
14	Kaie Kand	Estonia	8.79	1.73	12.17	5.92	2:13.52	4256	
15	Alena-Maria Padi	Greece	8.73	1.73	10.91	6.09	2:12.76	4249	
