= Kamila Chudzik =

Polish heptathlete (born 1986)

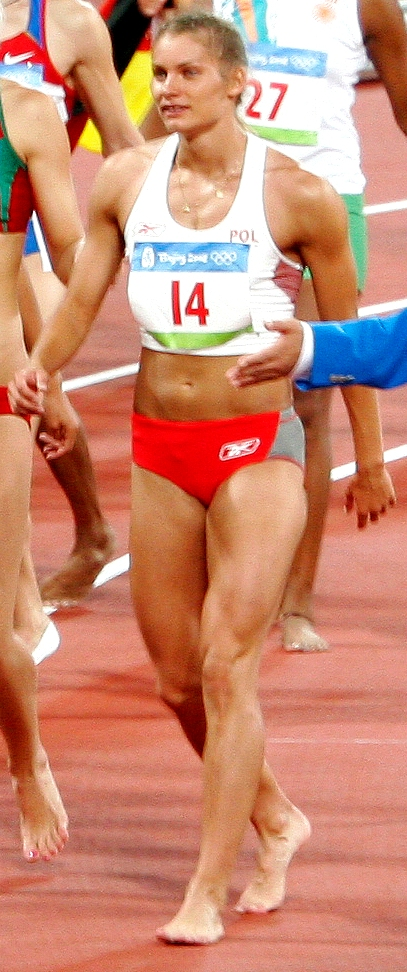

Medal record

Women's Athletics

Representing Poland

World Championships
Bronze medal – third place	2009 Berlin	Heptathlon

Kamila Chudzik (born 12 September 1986 in Kielce) is a retired Polish heptathlete. She won a bronze medal at the Berlin World Championship in August 2009. That success was followed by a series of injuries which effectively ended her career. She officially retired in 2015.

== Competition record ==
Year	Competition	Venue	Position	Event	Notes
Representing Poland
2007	European U23 Championships	Debrecen, Hungary	4th	Heptathlon	6097 pts
2007	World Championships	Osaka, Japan	21st	Heptathlon	5926 pts
2008	Olympic Games	Beijing, China	15th	Heptathlon	6157 pts
2009	European Indoor Championships	Turin, Italy	11th	Pentathlon	4322 pts
2009	World Championships	Berlin, Germany	3rd	Heptathlon	6471 pts

== Personal bests ==
Outdoor

- 200 metres – 24.33 (-0.2 m/s) (Berlin 2009)
- 800 metres – 2:17.41 (Zielona Góra 2008)
- 100 metres hurdles – 13.46 (+0.8 m/s) (Zielona Góra 2008)
- High jump – 1.81 m (Toruń 2007)
- Long jump – 6.55 m (+1.1 m/s) (Bydgoszcz 2009)
- Shot put – 15.10 m (Berlin 2009)
- Javelin throw – 55.15 m (Zielona Góra 2008)
- Heptathlon – 6494 pts (Zielona Góra 2008)

Indoor

- 800 metres – 2:20.85 (Spała 2008)
- 60 metres hurdles – 8.43 (Turin 2009)
- High jump – 1.71 m (Turin 2009)
- Long jump – 6.40 m (Spała 2008)
- Shot put – 15.28 m (Spała 2008)
- Pentathlon – 4537 pts (Spała 2008)

== Awards ==
For her sport achievements, she received:
Golden Cross of Merit in 2009.
