= 2004 World Junior Championships in Athletics – Women's heptathlon =

The women's heptathlon event at the 2004 World Junior Championships in Athletics was held in Grosseto, Italy, at Stadio Olimpico Carlo Zecchini on 16 and 17 July.

== Medalists ==
| Gold | Justine Robbeson; South Africa |
| Silver | Viktorija Žemaitytė; Lithuania |
| Bronze | Julia Mächtig; Germany |

== Results ==
=== Final ===
16/17 July

The highest mark recorded in each event is highlighted in yellow

| Rank | Name | Nationality | 100m H | HJ | SP | 200m | LJ | JT | 800m | Points | Notes |
|---|---|---|---|---|---|---|---|---|---|---|---|
| 1st place, gold medalist(s) | Justine Robbeson | South Africa | 13.56 (w: 1.7 m/s) | 1.62 | 13.02 | 25.12 (w: -1.4 m/s) | 6.14 | 54.16 | 2:35.20 | 5868 | |
| 2nd place, silver medalist(s) | Viktorija Žemaitytė | Lithuania | 14.39 (w: 1.7 m/s) | 1.80 | 13.23 | 25.46 (w: -1.4 m/s) | 5.82 | 42.51 | 2:21.07 | 5810 | |
| 3rd place, bronze medalist(s) | Julia Mächtig | Germany | 14.94 (w: 0.6 m/s) | 1.74 | 12.83 | 25.36 (w: -0.3 m/s) | 5.88 | 39.88 | 2:16.03 | 5679 | |
| 4 | Antoinette Nana Djimou Ida | France | 13.99 (w: 1.7 m/s) | 1.65 | 11.94 | 25.34 (w: -0.3 m/s) | 5.78 | 43.18 | 2:18.10 | 5649 | |
| 5 | Kathrin Geissler | Germany | 13.97 (w: 1.7 m/s) | 1.80 | 10.35 | 24.36 (w: -1.4 m/s) | 6.11 | 28.86 | 2:18.48 | 5641 | |
| 6 | Marina Goncharova | Russia | 14.79 (w: 0.6 m/s) | 1.68 | 12.07 | 25.67 (w: -1.4 m/s) | 5.82 | 43.02 | 2:15.40 | 5599 | |
| 7 | Györgyi Farkas | Hungary | 14.24 (w: 0.6 m/s) | 1.74 | 10.52 | 26.01 (w: -0.3 m/s) | 5.78 | 40.84 | 2:16.22 | 5550 | |
| 8 | Jessica Ennis | Great Britain | 13.57 (w: 0.6 m/s) | 1.80 | 10.52 | 24.23 (w: -0.3 m/s) | 5.59 | 28.04 | 2:19.16 | 5542 | |
| 9 | Cecilia Ricali | Italy | 14.18 (w: 0.6 m/s) | 1.74 | 10.45 | 25.74 (w: -0.3 m/s) | 5.78 | 33.57 | 2:14.72 | 5459 | |
| 10 | Nadezhda Sergeeva | Russia | 14.36 (w: 1.7 m/s) | 1.62 | 12.76 | 25.17 (w: -0.3 m/s) | 5.68 | 32.14 | 2:15.35 | 5427 | |
| 11 | Gayle Hunter | United States | 13.69 (w: 1.7 m/s) | 1.71 | 9.82 | 24.97 (w: -1.4 m/s) | 5.97 | 33.81 | 2:27.57 | 5411 | |
| 12 | Ellen Sprunger | Switzerland | 14.86 (w: 0.6 m/s) | 1.59 | 11.55 | 24.90 (w: -1.4 m/s) | 5.52 | 39.55 | 2:19.32 | 5309 | |
| 13 | Diane Barras | France | 13.97 (w: 0.6 m/s) | 1.68 | 10.64 | 25.82 (w: -1.4 m/s) | 5.85 | 31.49 | 2:24.80 | 5265 | |
| 14 | Yuliya Tarasova | Uzbekistan | 14.85 (w: 1.7 m/s) | 1.68 | 11.70 | 25.90 (w: -1.4 m/s) | 5.72 | 37.85 | 2:47.55 | 5019 | |
| 15 | Bregje Crolla | Netherlands | 15.22 (w: 1.7 m/s) | 1.56 | 10.64 | 27.33 (w: -0.3 m/s) | 5.07 | 47.93 | 2:18.61 | 4998 | |
| | Nadina Marsh | Jamaica | 13.98 (w: 0.6 m/s) | 1.68 | 10.91 | 25.72 (w: -0.3 m/s) | 5.88 | NM | DNS | DNF | |

== Participation ==
According to an unofficial count, 16 athletes from 13 countries participated in the event.

- France (2)
- Germany (2)
- Hungary (1)
- Italy (1)
- Jamaica (1)
- Lithuania (1)
- Netherlands (1)
- Russia (2)
- South Africa (1)
- Switzerland (1)
- United Kingdom (1)
- United States (1)
- Uzbekistan (1)
