= Julia Mächtig =

German heptathlete

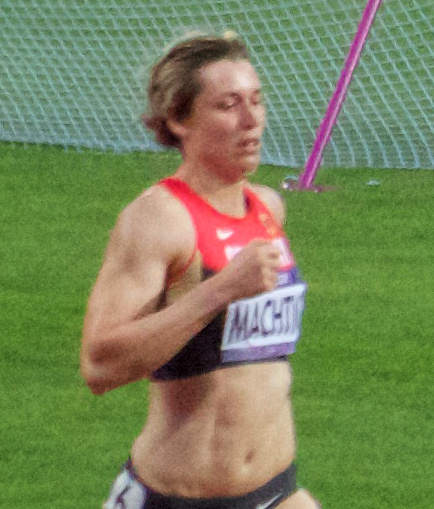
- Mächtig competing at the 2012 Olympics in London.

Personal information
- Nationality: German
- Born: 1 January 1986 (age 40) Rostock, East Germany
- Height: 1.87 m (6 ft 1 1/2 in)
- Weight: 80 kg (176 lb)

Sport
- Country: Germany
- Sport: Athletics
- Event(s): Heptathlon, long jump
- Coached by: Klaus Baarck
- Updated on 4 August 2012

Julia Mächtig (born 1 January 1986 in Rostock) is a German heptathlete. She has a personal best of 6430 points for the event.

She began competing in heptathlon competitions from a young age. She placed eighth at the 2003 World Youth Championships in Athletics then won her first international medals as a junior athlete, taking bronze at the 2004 World Junior Championships and silver at the 2005 European Athletics Junior Championships. She won the German senior long jump title in 2006. In the 2007 season she won her first national heptathlon title and placed third at the 2007 European Athletics U23 Championships. She also made her senior international debut at the 2007 European Athletics Indoor Championships, where she came ninth in the women's pentathlon.

Mächtig represented Germany at the World Championships in Athletics in 2009, 2011 and 2013. She placed ninth with 6265 points on her debut outing, but was less successful in 2011 with her 17th-place finish. In 2012 she won the Mehrkampf-Meeting Ratingen with a personal best score of 6341 points, which included a long jump best of 6.49 metres. In 2013, she improved her personal best at the Ratingen meet.

== Achievements ==
Year	Competition	Venue	Position	Event	Notes
Representing Germany
2004	World Junior Championships	Grosseto, Italy	3rd	Heptathlon	5679 pts
2006	Hypo-Meeting	Götzis, Austria	17th	Heptathlon	5862 pts
2007	European Indoor Championships	Moscow, Russia	9th	Pentathlon	4414 pts
2007	Hypo-Meeting	Götzis, Austria	12th	Heptathlon	6077 pts
2007	European U23 Championships	Debrecen, Hungary	3rd	Heptathlon	6151 pts
2008	Hypo-Meeting	Götzis, Austria	8th	Heptathlon	6282 pts
2009	Hypo-Meeting	Götzis, Austria	5th	Heptathlon	6320 pts
2009	World Championships	Berlin, Germany	9th	Heptathlon	6265 pts
2011	World Championships	Daegu, South Korea	17th	Heptathlon	6095 pts
