= Viktorija Žemaitytė =

Lithuanian heptathlete (born 1985)

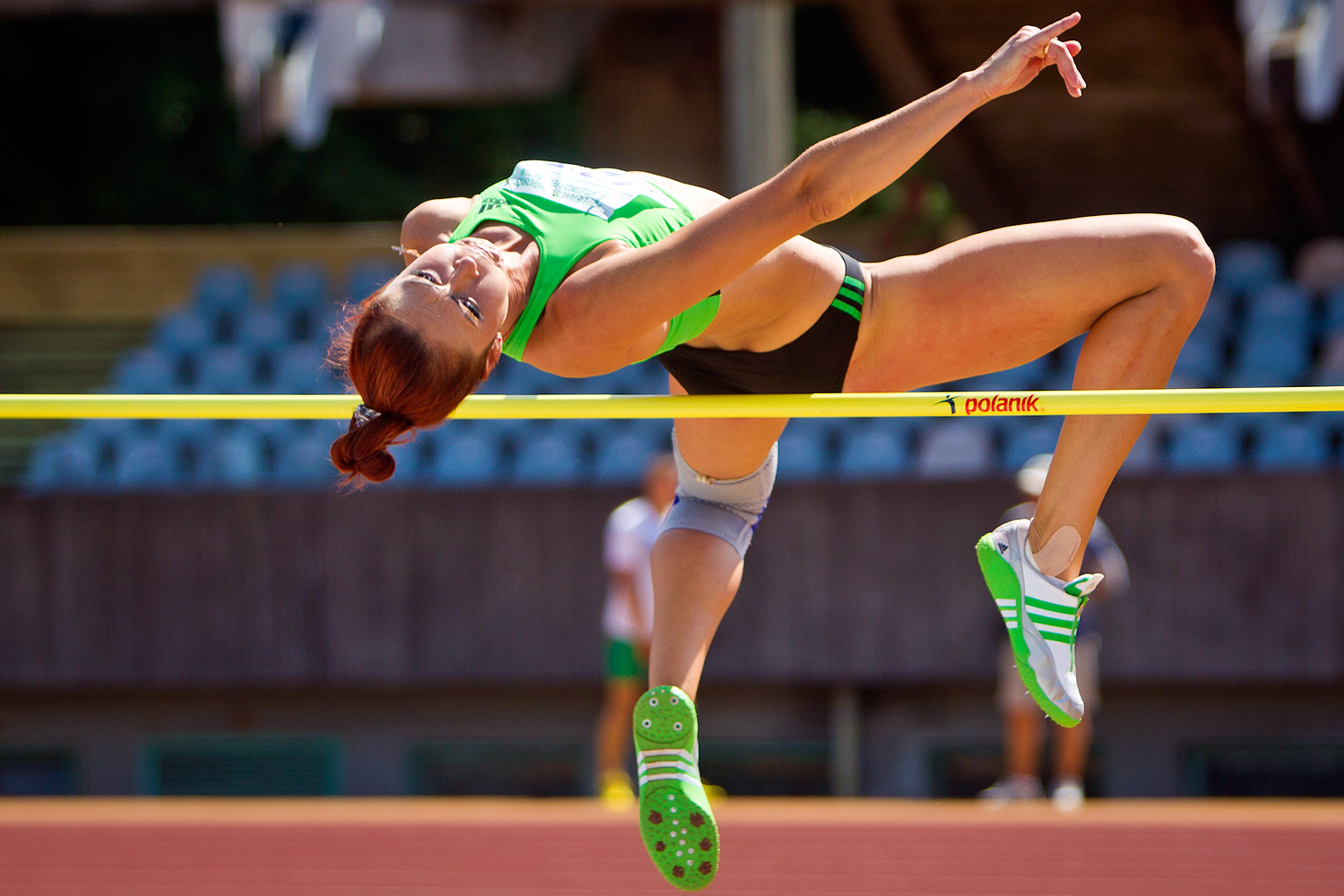

Personal information
- Born: 11 March 1985 (age 40) Kaunas, Lithuanian SSR, Soviet Union

Viktorija Žemaitytė (born 11 March 1985) is a Lithuanian track and field athlete. She represented Lithuania in the heptathlon at the 2008 Summer Olympics.

== Achievements ==
Year	Competition	Venue	Position	Event	Notes
Representing Lithuania
2001	World Youth Championships	Debrecen, Hungary	10th	Heptathlon	4950 pts
2003	European Junior Championships	Tampere, Finland	5th	Heptathlon	5539 pts
2004	World Junior Championships	Grosseto, Italy	2nd	Heptathlon	5810 pts
2005	European U23 Championships	Erfurt, Germany	4th	Heptathlon	5913 pts
2005	Universiade	İzmir, Turkey	6th	Heptathlon	5745 pts
2006	European Championships	Gothenburg, Sweden	23rd	Heptathlon	5694 pts
2007	European U23 Championships	Debrecen, Hungary	1st	Heptathlon	6219 pts
2007	Universiade	Bangkok, Thailand	1st	Heptathlon	5971 pts
2008	Olympic Games	Beijing, China	–	Heptathlon	DNF
2009	European Indoor Championships	Turin, Italy	6th	Pentathlon	4516 pts
2011	Universiade	Shenzhen, China	2nd	Heptathlon	5958 pts
