= Jolanda Keizer =

Dutch heptathlete

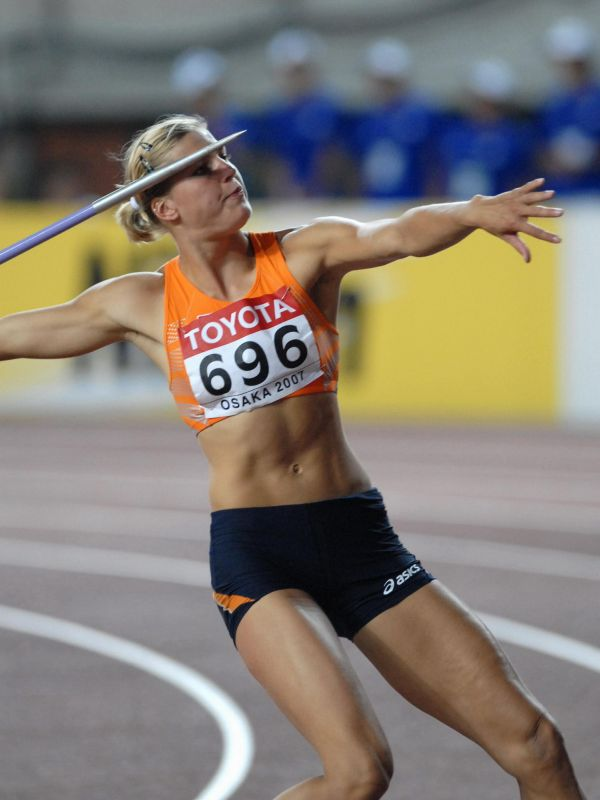
- Jolanda Keizer at the 2007 World Championships in Osaka

Personal information
- Full name: Jolanda Keizer
- Born: April 5, 1985 (age 41) Amsterdam, Netherlands
- Years active: 2000-present
- Height: 1.83 m (6 ft 0 in)
- Weight: 69 kg (152 lb)

Achievements and titles
- Personal best(s): heptathlon – 6370 (2008) pentathlon - 4644 (2009)
- Updated on 14 August 2009

Jolanda Keizer (Dutch: [joːˈlɑndaː ˈkɛizər]; born 5 April 1985) is a Dutch heptathlete.

== Achievements ==
Year	Competition	Venue	Position	Event	Notes
Representing the Netherlands
2005	European U23 Championships	Erfurt, Germany	6th	Heptathlon	5760 pts
2007	European U23 Championships	Debrecen, Hungary	2nd	Heptathlon	6219 pts
2007	World Championships	Osaka, Japan	14th	Heptathlon	6102 pts
2008	Hypo-Meeting	Götzis, Austria	25th	Heptathlon	5014 pts
2008	Olympic Games	Beijing, China	8th	Heptathlon	6370 pts
2009	European Indoor Championships	Turin, Italy	2nd	Pentathlon	4644 pts

Awards
Preceded by Lornah Kiplagat	Women's Dutch Athlete of the Year; 2009	Succeeded by Yvonne Hak
