= Kaie Kand =

Estonian heptathlete

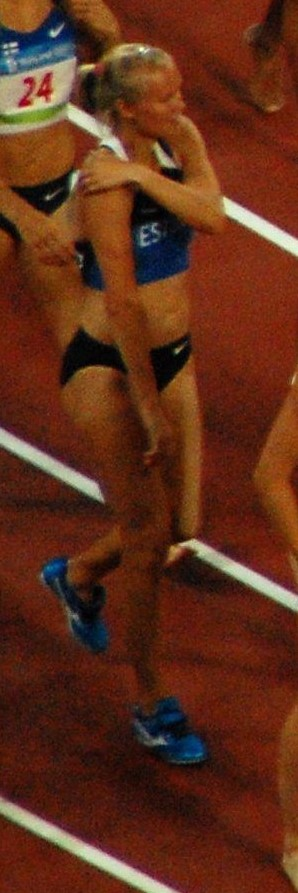

Personal information
- Born: 31 March 1984 (age 41)

Kaie Kand (born 31 March 1984 in Orissaare) is a retired Estonian heptathlete. Her personal best score is 5979 points, achieved in May 2009 in Götzis. In 2009, she set an Estonian national indoor record in the pentathlon (4580 points). Her coach was Remigija Nazarovienė.

== Achievements ==
Year	Competition	Venue	Position	Event	Result
Representing Estonia
2005	European U23 Championships	Erfurt, Germany	14th	Heptathlon	5441 pts
2006	European Championships	Gothenburg, Sweden	25th	Heptathlon	5613 pts
2007	World Championships	Osaka, Japan	30th	Heptathlon	5616 pts
2007	European Indoor Championships	Birmingham, England	14th	Pentathlon	4256 pts
2008	Olympic Games	Beijing, China	32nd	Heptathlon	5677 pts
2009	World Championships	Berlin, Germany	18th	Heptathlon	5760 pts
2009	European Indoor Championships	Turin, Italy	13th	Pentathlon	3650 pts
2011	European Indoor Championships	Paris, France	8th	Pentathlon	4399 pts
