= 2008 IAAF World Indoor Championships – Women's pentathlon =

At the 2008 IAAF World Indoor Championships, Tia Hellebaut won the women's pentathlon with 3016 points, placing first in the high jump and second in the long jump.

== Medalists ==
Gold
Tia Hellebaut	Belgium
Silver
Kelly Sotherton	United Kingdom
Bronze
Anna Bogdanova	Russia

== 60 metres Hurdles ==
Pos	Lane	Name	Country	Mark	React	Points
1	5	Kelly Sotherton	United Kingdom	8.25	0.212	1073
2	6	Anna Bogdanova	Russia	8.39	0.220	1041
3	2	Tia Hellebaut	Belgium	8.54	0.238	1008
4	3	Lyudmila Blonska	Ukraine	8.57	0.247	1002
5	8	Nataliya Dobrynska	Ukraine	8.63 SB	0.272	989
6	4	Tatyana Chernova	Russia	8.64 PB	0.256	987
7	1	Karolina Tymińska	Poland	8.65	0.275	984
8	7	Austra Skujytė	Lithuania	8.84 SB	0.242	944

== High Jump ==
Pos	Name	Country	Mark	Attempts														Points
Pos	Name	Country	Mark	1.63	1.66	1.69	1.72	1.75	1.78	1.81	1.84	1.87	1.90	1.93	1.96	1.99	2.02	Points
1	Tia Hellebaut	Belgium	1.99 SB	-	-	-	-	-	-	-	O	-	XO	-	O	O	XXX	1224
2	Anna Bogdanova	Russia	1.84 SB	-	-	-	O	O	O	O	O	XXX						1029
3	Tatyana Chernova	Russia	1.81 PB	-	-	-	O	O	XO	O	XXX							991
4	Kelly Sotherton	United Kingdom	1.81 SB	-	-	-	O	O	O	XO	XXX							991
5	Austra Skujytė	Lithuania	1.81	-	-	O	XXO	O	XXO	XXO	XXX							991
6	Lyudmila Blonska	Ukraine	1.78 SB	-	-	-	-	XO	XO	XXX								953
7	Nataliya Dobrynska	Ukraine	1.78 SB	-	-	O	O	O	XXX									916
8	Karolina Tymińska	Poland	1.72 PB	O	O	O	O	XXX										879

== Shot Put ==
Pos	Name	Country	Mark	Attempts			Points
Pos	Name	Country	Mark	1	2	3	Points
1	Nataliya Dobrynska	Ukraine	17.18 PB	16.51	17.18	X	1008
2	Austra Skujytė	Lithuania	17.00 PB	16.83	17.00	16.75	995
3	Kelly Sotherton	United Kingdom	14.57 PB	14.06	14.57	14.37	832
4	Anna Bogdanova	Russia	14.56 PB	14.48	14.56	14.14	831
5	Karolina Tymińska	Poland	14.30	14.30	X	X	814
6	Lyudmila Blonska	Ukraine	14.12 PB	13.94	14.12	X	802
7	Tia Hellebaut	Belgium	13.85 PB	13.85	13.75	13.69	784
8	Tatyana Chernova	Russia	13.11 PB	12.62	X	13.11	735

== Long Jump ==
Pos	Name	Country	Mark	Attempts			Points
Pos	Name	Country	Mark	1	2	3	Points
1	Kelly Sotherton	United Kingdom	6.45 SB	X	X	6.45	991
2	Tia Hellebaut	Belgium	6.41 SB	X	6.23	6.41	978
3	Anna Bogdanova	Russia	6.38	6.38	6.30	6.34	969
4	Nataliya Dobrynska	Ukraine	6.31 SB	6.18	6.30	6.31	946
5	Lyudmila Blonska	Ukraine	6.31	X	6.24	6.31	946
6	Tatyana Chernova	Russia	6.28 PB	6.06	5.89	6.28	937
7	Austra Skujytė	Lithuania	6.22 SB	6.22	X	6.15	918
8	Karolina Tymińska	Poland	6.22	6.22	X	-	918

== 800 metres ==
Pos	Name	Country	Mark	Points
1	Karolina Tymińska	Poland	2:08.64	985
2	Kelly Sotherton	United Kingdom	2:09.95 PB	965
3	Tatyana Chernova	Russia	2:14.96 PB	893
4	Anna Bogdanova	Russia	2:15.67	883
5	Nataliya Dobrynska	Ukraine	2:15.69 PB	883
6	Tia Hellebaut	Belgium	2:16.42 SB	873
7	Austra Skujytė	Lithuania	2:21.23 SB	807
8	Lyudmila Blonska	Ukraine	2:23.92 SB	771

== Summary ==
Pos	Name	Country	Total	60mH	HJ	SP	LJ	800m
Gold medal	Tia Hellebaut	Belgium	4867 WL	1008	1224	784	978	873
Silver medal	Kelly Sotherton	United Kingdom	4852 SB	1073	991	832	991	965
Bronze medal	Anna Bogdanova	Russia	4753	1041	1029	831	969	883
4	Nataliya Dobrynska	Ukraine	4742	989	916	1008	946	883
5	Austra Skujytė	Lithuania	4655 SB	944	991	995	918	807
6	Karolina Tymińska	Poland	4580	984	879	814	918	985
7	Tatyana Chernova	Russia	4543	987	991	735	937	893
8	Lyudmila Blonska	Ukraine	4474	1002	953	802	946	771
