= Sharon Day-Monroe =

American heptathlete and high jumper

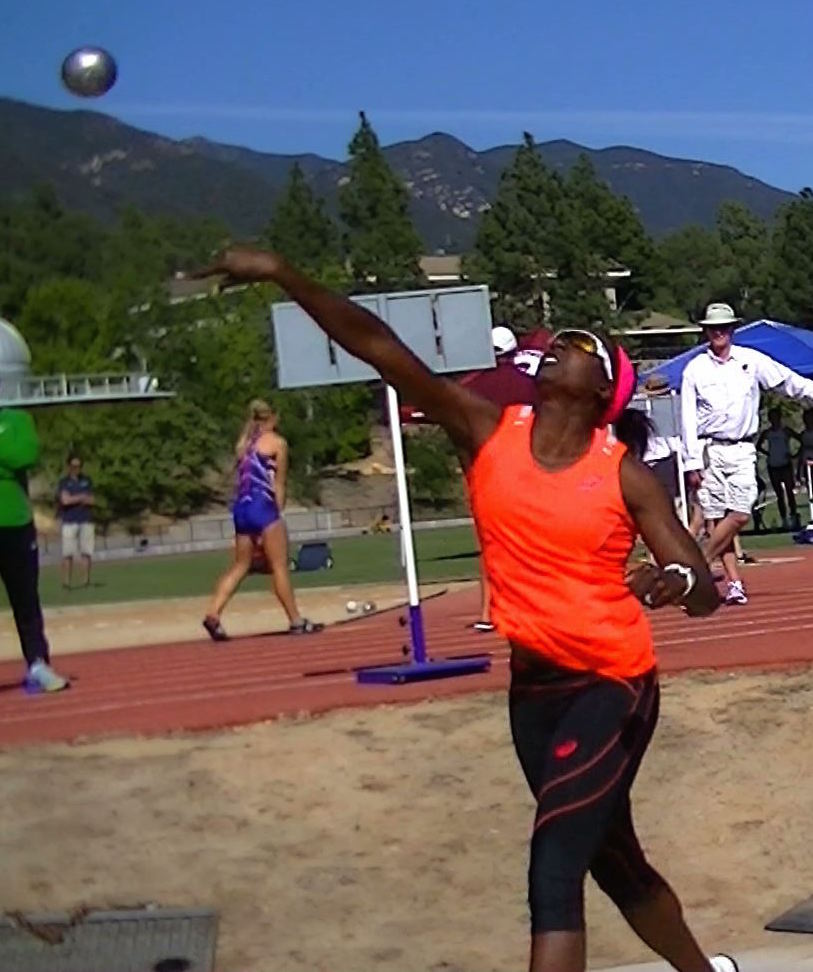
- Sharon Day-Monroe at the 2015 Sam Adams Multi-Event Meet at Westmont College in Montecito, California

Personal information
- National team: United States
- Born: Sharon Day; June 9, 1985 (age 41) Brooklyn, New York, U.S.
- Height: 1.75 m (5 ft 9 in)
- Weight: 73 kg (161 lb)

Sport
- Country: United States
- Sport: Athletics
- Event: Heptathlon
- University team: Cal Poly Mustangs
- Club: ASICS
- Team: USA
- Turned pro: 2008
- Coached by: Jack Hoyt (2006–2015) Danny Williams (2014–2017) Les Courtemanche (2017–2018)
- Retired: 2018

Achievements and titles
- Olympic finals: 2008, 2012
- Highest world ranking: 5th (Heptathlon, 2013)
- Personal bests: 1st: 2005 NCAA Outdoor Championships (High Jump, Collegiate National Title) / U.S. Record-Holder, Indoor Pentathlon from 2014 to 2023
Medal record
Women's athletics
Representing United States
Pan American Junior Championships
Gold medal – first place	2003 Bridgetown	High jump
IAAF World Junior Championships
Bronze medal – third place	2004 Grosseto	High jump

Sharon Day-Monroe (née Day; born June 9, 1985) is an American heptathlete, pentathlete and high jumper. She is the 2011, 2013, and 2014 national heptathlon champion.

Day-Monroe was also the 2012–2015 national indoor pentathlon champion, a two-time Olympian (part of Team USA in 2008 and 2012), held the U.S. national pentathlon scoring record from 2014 until 2023, and is the first athlete to win four consecutive national championships in the pentathlon. She was signed with ASICS as a professional.

== Early life ==
Day originally excelled in the high jump. As a junior athlete, she was the 2003 Pan American Junior champion in the high jump, and in 2004, she won the bronze medal at the World Junior Championships, clearing 1.91 meters.

While at Costa Mesa High School she was the CIF California State Meet champion two years in a row, and was coached in the high jump by her father, Eugene Day. Day's mother, Yolanda Day, was also an elite high jumper, and her sister, Jasmin Day, competed in the high jump for the University of Arizona. During her junior year, she defeated senior Chaunte Howard.

== Collegiate records and championships ==
Day attended Cal Poly in San Luis Obispo, where she won the 2005 NCAA Women's Outdoor Track and Field Championship while setting the then-school record in the high jump at the time, with a clearance of 6–4.

She later improved upon her own school record for the high jump, clearing 6 feet, 4.75 inches in May 2008. Day-Monroe also holds the school record in the heptathlon, which she attempted at the end of her college career, after also being a standout soccer player in the fall. As a forward in soccer for the Mustangs from 2003 to 2005 and 2007, Day tallied 27 career goals and 14 assists in 79 appearances.

Day suffered a plant foot fracture in 2005 that required two surgeries and a year of rehabilitation. All of the heptathlon events except the high jump were taught to Day by her coach, Jack Hoyt. Day had not competed in the long jump, hurdles, shot put, javelin, 200 meters, or 800 meters prior to spring 2007, but she trained for these events after her soccer season.

== Career personal bests (outdoor) ==
Event	Performance (Metric)	Ft.–Ins.	Location	Date
Heptathlon	6,550 points		Des Moines	June 21, 2013
200-metre dash	24.02 (+1.0 m/s)		Des Moines	June 20, 2013
800 metres	2:08.94		Moscow	August 16, 2013
100m hurdles	13.31 (+1.4 m/s)		Eugene	June 27, 2015
High jump	1.95	6–4.75	Northridge	May 17, 2008
High jump	1.95	6–4.75	Eugene	June 25, 2009
Long jump	6.15 (+1.7 m/s)	20–2.25	Walnut	April 20, 2012
Javelin throw	52.78	173–2	Pomona	June 2, 2018
Shot put	15.62	51–3	Eugene	June 27, 2015

== Professional national and global events ==
=== 2007 Outdoor championship ===
Day-Monroe earned a silver medal in the high jump, clearing 1.89m (or 6–2.25).

=== 2008 U.S. Outdoor championship ===
She earned the bronze medal in the high jump, clearing 1.91m (6–3.25).

    1.79 1.84 1.89 1.91 1.93
       O    O   XO   XO  XXX

=== 2008 Beijing Olympics ===
At the 2008 Summer Olympics, she high-jumped 1.85m to finish 24th in qualifying.

=== 2009 U.S. Outdoor championship ===
Day-Monroe earned a silver medal, scoring 6,177 points.

=== 2009 World Championship ===
At the 2009 World Championships in Athletics in Berlin, she competed in both the high jump, finishing 17th, and the heptathlon, finishing 10th as the top American finisher (scoring 6,126 points).

=== 2010 U.S. Outdoor championships ===
Day-Monroe won the silver, scoring 6,006 points.

=== 2011 U.S. Outdoor championships ===
Day-Monroe won the heptathlon by scoring 6,058 points.

=== 2011 World Championship ===
She finished 18th at the 2011 World Championships in Daegu, South Korea while scoring 6,043 points.

=== 2012 Indoor Championships ===
Day-Monroe won the pentathlon by scoring 4,567 points.

Event	Performance	English Conversion	Points
60m hurdles	8.46		1,026
High Jump	1.85m	6-00.75	1,041
Shot Put	13.29m	43-07 ¼	747
Long Jump	5.89m	19-04	816
800m	2:11.89		937

=== 2012 U.S. Olympic Trials ===
Day-Monroe trained at the time with then-UCLA coach Jack Hoyt, and volunteered as an assistant coach with the UCLA team. While winning the Sam Adams Multi-Event meet at Westmont College in Montecito, California, Day achieved the "A" standard for the 2012 Olympics. She won the silver with 6,343 points

=== 2012 London Olympics ===
She finished 16th in the heptathlon at the 2012 Olympics in London, with 6,232 points.

=== 2013 USA Indoor championships ===
Day-Monroe won the pentathlon for the second consecutive year, scoring 4,478 points.

Event	Performance	English Conversion	Points
60m hurdles	8.57		1,002
High Jump	1.82m	5-11 ½	1,003
Shot Put	15.07m	49-5 ½	866
Long Jump	5.82m	19-1 ¼	795
800m	2:20.86		812

=== 2013 USA Outdoor championships ===
Day-Monroe won the heptathlon with 6,550 points.

=== 2013 Moscow World Championships ===
At the 2013 World Championships in Moscow, she finished sixth in the heptathlon, scoring 6,407 points.

=== 2014 USATF Indoor Championship and American Record ===
Day-Monroe broke the American pentathlon record at the USA Indoor Track & Field Championships in the Albuquerque Convention Center. It was the third consecutive national indoor championship for Day-Monroe, who finished with a score of 4,805. The national scoring record stood until 2023 when Anna Hall surpassed it.

Day-Monroe's total was 238 points ahead of her previous career best, and eclipsed the old record which had been shared by DeDee Nathan (set on March 5, 1999) and Hyleas Fountain (tied on March 10, 2013), by a margin of 52 points. Day-Monroe set a personal best of 8.44 seconds in the 60-meter hurdles, then cleared 1.88 meters (or 6 feet, 2 inches) to win the high jump, and proceeded to put forth marks of 15.59 meters (or 51–1.75) in the shot put and 6.09m (19–11.75) in the long jump. Needing a time of 2:16.87 in the 800 meters to break the record, Day-Monroe closed by finishing in 2:13.19. For her record performance, she was named USATF's Athlete of the Week.

Her mark was the world-leading performance of 2014 until the World Indoor Championships, where it was surpassed by Nadine Broersen. Day-Monroe finished with 4,718 points at Worlds, including a field-leading 2:09.80 time in the 800m.

Event	Mark	Points
2014 IAAF World Indoor Championships
60 hurdles	8.43	1,032 points
High Jump	1.84	1,029 points
Shot Put	14.95	858 points
Long Jump	5.94	831 points
800 meters	2:09.80	968 points

=== 2014 USATF Outdoor Championship ===
Day-Monroe won the heptathlon with 6,470 points.

Event	Performance	Wind	English conversion	Points
100 meters hurdles	13.42	0.9		1,062
High Jump	1.84m		6-00.50	1,029
Shot Put	15.45m		50–08.25	891
200 meters	24.40	2.6		943
Long Jump	5.85m	1.8	19–02.50	804
Javelin	46.84m		153-08	799
800 meters	2:11.54			942

=== 2015 USA Indoor championships ===
Day-Monroe won the pentathlon, her fourth consecutive indoor championship, in scoring 4,654 points.

Event	Performance	English Conversion	Points
60m hurdles	8.56		1,004
High Jump	1.83m	6-0	1,016
Shot Put	15.41m	50-6 ¾	888
Long Jump	5.94m	19-6	831
800m	2:13.45		915
4654 points

=== 2015 USATF Outdoor Championship ===
Day-Monroe was runner-up in the heptathlon with 6,458 points.

Event	Performance	Wind	English conversion	Points
100 meters hurdles	13.31	1.4		1,078
High Jump	1.76m		5-09.25	928
Shot Put	15.45m		50–08.25	891
200 meters	24.32	0.7		950
Long Jump	6.05m	0.9	19–10.25	865
Javelin	44.90m		147-04	762
800 meters	2:09.41			973

=== 2015 Beijing World Championships ===
She placed 14th in the heptathlon at the 2015 World Championships in Athletics, with 6,246 Points.

Event	Points	Performance	Wind
100 Metres Hurdles	Points: 1,062	Mark: 13.42	Wind m/s: -0.7
High Jump	Points: 941	Mark: 1.77	Wind m/s:
Shot Put	Points: 851	Mark: 14.85	Wind m/s:
200 Metres	Points: 882	Mark: 25.05	Wind m/s: -1.3
Long Jump	Points: 786	Mark: 5.79	Wind m/s: +1.0
Javelin Throw	Points: 783	Mark: 46.02	Wind m/s:
800 Metres	Points: 941	Mark: 2:11.61	Wind m/s:

=== 2016 United States Olympic Trials ===
Day-Monroe finished fourth in the heptathlon with 6,385 points.

Event	Performance	Wind	English conversion	Points
100 meters hurdles	13.60	-0.2		1,036
High Jump	1.81m		5–11.25	991
Shot Put	15.19m		49–10.0	874
200 meters	24.73	0.7		912
Long Jump	5.99m	2.4	19–08.00	846
Javelin	49.19m		161-05	844
800 meters	2:10.87			952

=== 2017 Indoor Championships ===
Day-Monroe earned a silver medal in the pentathlon, scoring 4,404 points at 2017 USA Indoor Track and Field Championships.

Event	Performance	English Conversion	Points
60m hurdles	8.552		1,004
High Jump	1.75m	5-08.75	916
Shot Put	14.44m	47–04.50	823
Long Jump	5.85m	19–02.50	804
800m	2:17.55		857
