= Linda Züblin =

Swiss heptathlete

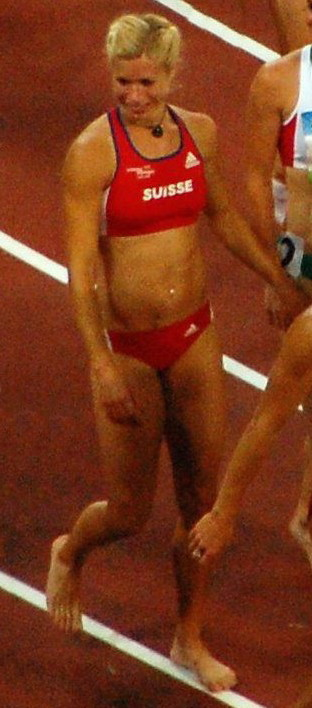
Züblin in 2008

Linda Züblin (born 21 March 1986) is a Swiss heptathlete, who competed for her country at the 2008 Summer Olympics.

== Achievements ==
Year	Competition	Venue	Position	Event	Notes
Representing Switzerland
2007	Hypo-Meeting	Götzis, Austria	17th	Heptathlon	5938 pts
2007	European U23 Championships	Debrecen, Hungary	11th	Heptathlon	5878 pts
2007	World Championships	Osaka, Japan	20th	Heptathlon	5995 pts
2008	Hypo-Meeting	Götzis, Austria	22nd	Heptathlon	6018 pts
2008	Olympic Games	Beijing, PR China	30th	Heptathlon	5743 pts
2009	Hypo-Meeting	Götzis, Austria	10th	Heptathlon	5957 pts
2009	World Championships	Berlin, Germany	16th	Heptathlon	5934 pts
