= Novopokrovka, Kyrgyzstan =

Novopokrovka Новопокровка
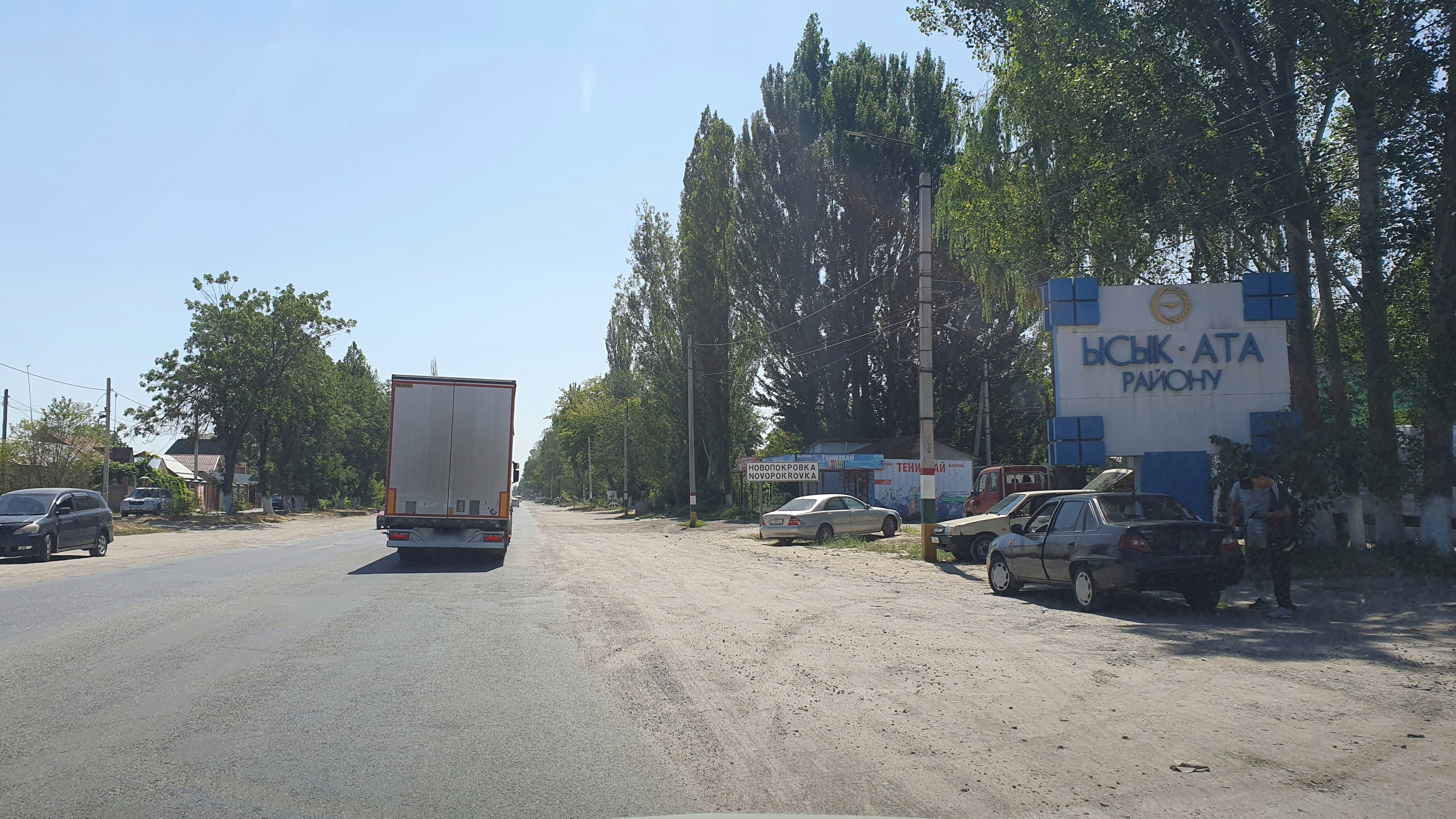

- Location within Kyrgyzstan
- Coordinates: 42°52′15″N 74°45′03″E
- Country: Kyrgyzstan
- Region: Chüy Region
- District: Ysyk-Ata District
- Elevation: 735 m (2,411 ft)

Population (2021)
  - Total: 21,619

Novopokrovka is a village in the Ysyk-Ata District of Chüy Region of Kyrgyzstan. Divided over two rural communities, its total population was 21,619 in 2021.

== Population ==
Historical population
| Year | Pop. | ±% p.a. |
|---|---|---|
| 1993 | 12,644 | — |
| 2009 | 19,135 | +2.62% |
| 2021 | 21,619 | +1.02% |
Note: resident population; Sources:
