= Norway at the 2009 World Championships in Athletics =

- WA code: NOR
- National federation: Norges Friidrettsforbund
- Website: www.friidrett.no/t2.aspx?p=44098

in Berlin
- Competitors: 14
- Medals: Gold 1 Silver 1 Bronze 0 Total 2

World Championships in Athletics appearances (overview)
- 1980; 1983; 1987; 1991; 1993; 1995; 1997; 1999; 2001; 2003; 2005; 2007; 2009; 2011; 2013; 2015; 2017; 2019; 2022; 2023; 2025

Norway competed at the 2009 World Championships in Athletics from 15 to 23 August. A team of 14 athletes was announced in preparation for the competition. Selected athletes have achieved one of the competition's qualifying standards. Javelin thrower Andreas Thorkildsen is the defending olympic and European champion, and has won silver in the last two World Championships in Athletics.

== Team selection ==
Track and road events

Event	Athletes	
Event	Men	Women
100 metres	Jaysuma Saidy Ndure	Ezinne Okparaebo
100 metres hurdles		Christina Vukicevic
3000 m steeplechase	Bjørnar Ustad Kristensen	Silje Fjørtoft; Karoline Bjerkeli Grøvdal
20 kilometres walk	Erik Tysse	Kjersti Tysse Plätzer
50 kilometres walk	Erik Tysse; Trond Nymark	—

Field and combined events

Event	Athletes	
Event	Men	Women
High jump		Stine Kufaas
Long jump		Margrethe Renstrøm
Discus throw	Gaute Myklebust	
Javelin throw	Andreas Thorkildsen	
Heptathlon		Ida Marcussen
