= Sushmitha Singha Roy =

Indian heptathlete

Personal information
- Full name: Sushmitha Singha Roy
- Nationality: India
- Born: 26 March 1984 (age 42) Midnapore, India
- Height: 1.75 m (5 ft 9 in)
- Weight: 66 kg (146 lb)

Sport
- Sport: Athletics
- Event: Heptathlon
- Club: Indian Railways

Achievements and titles
- Personal bests: Heptathlon: 6,027 points (2008)
Medal record
Women's athletics
Representing India
Asian Championships
Silver medal – second place	2005 Incheon	Heptathlon
Bronze medal – third place	2007 Amman	Heptathlon

Sushmitha Singha Roy (born 26 March 1984 in Midnapore) is an Indian heptathlete. She had won a silver and a bronze medal for her respective category at the IAAF Asian Championships (2005 in Incheon, South Korea, and 2007 in Amman, Jordan).

Singha Roy qualified for the women's heptathlon at the 2008 Summer Olympics in Beijing, after attaining a B-standard of 5,866 points from the Indian Federation Cup in Bhopal. She initially placed thirty-third out of forty-three heptathletes in the event, with a total score of 5,705 points, but was elevated to a single higher position, when Ukraine's Lyudmila Blonska stripped of her silver medal for failing the doping test on methyltestosterone.

The following year, Singha Roy suffered numerous setbacks in her sporting career. She finished last out of twenty-six athletes at the 2009 IAAF World Championships in Berlin, Germany, with a total tally of 4,983 points, which was farther from her personal best of 6,027, set at a national meet in Bangalore. She also missed out the 2009 Asian Championships in Guangzhou, China, and the Open National Championships in Bhopal, because of her left hamstring injury.

Singha Roy eventually came out of rehabilitation in time for her preparation and training to the 2010 Commonwealth Games in Delhi, representing the host nation India. Singha Roy nearly missed out of the podium after finishing sixth in the women's heptathlon with a total score of 5,120 points.
