= Jessica Samuelsson (heptathlete) =

Swedish heptathlete

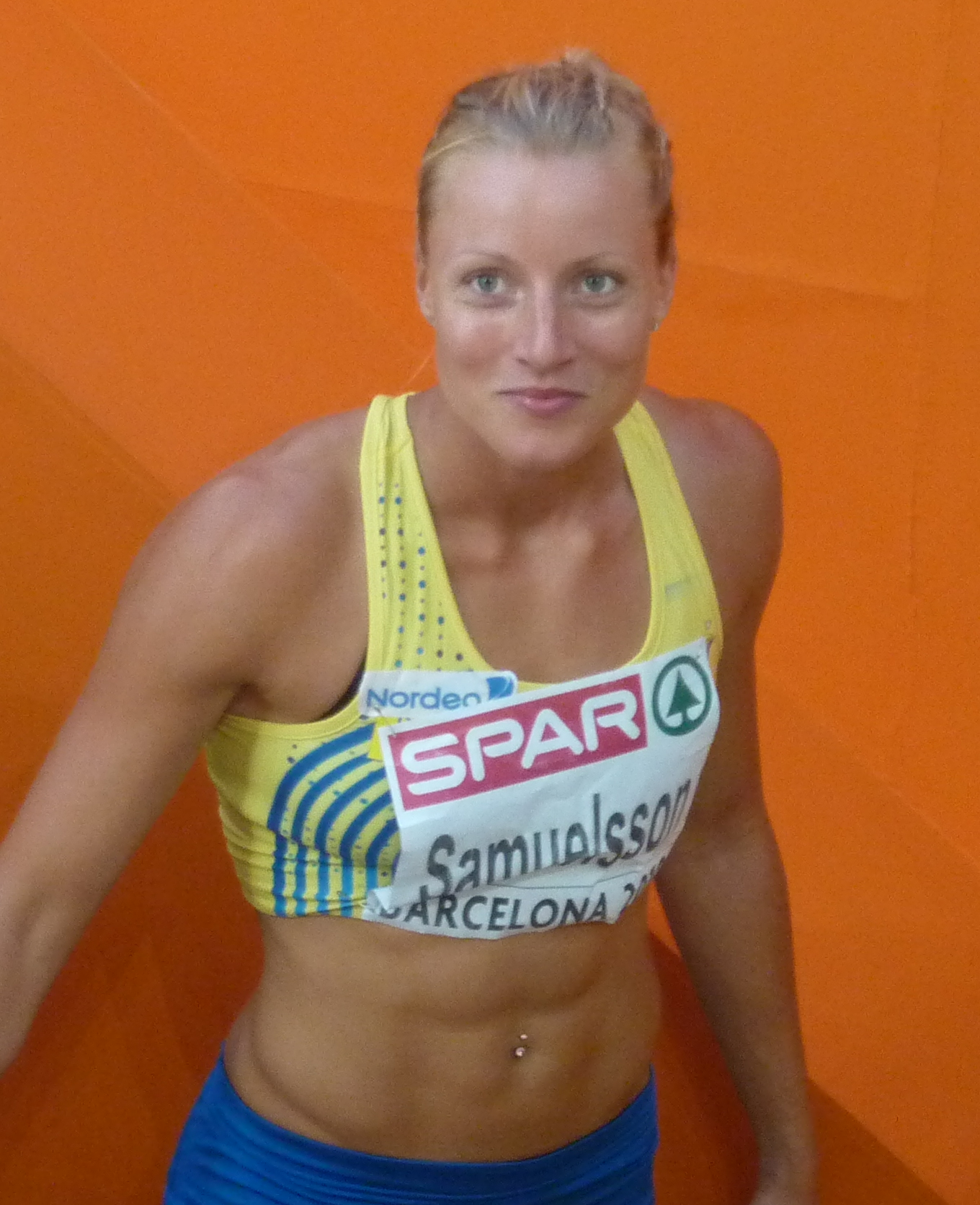
- Jessica Samuelsson

Personal information
- Born: 14 March 1985 (age 40)
- Height: 1.76 m (5 ft 9 1/2 in)
- Weight: 67 kg (148 lb)

Sport
- Country: Sweden
- Sport: Athletics
- Event: Heptathlon
- Coached by: Stefan Olsson
- Updated on 4 August 2012

Jessica Samuelsson (born 14 March 1985) is a Swedish former heptathlete. She represented her country at the 2012 Summer Olympics, where she placed 12th, as well as three World Championships. Her only major international medal came from the 2009 Summer Universiade where she won gold.

== Achievements ==
Year	Competition	Venue	Position	Event	Notes
Representing Sweden
2005	European U23 Championships	Erfurt, Germany	8th	Heptathlon	5633 pts
2007	European U23 Championships	Debrecen, Hungary	13th	Heptathlon	5761 pts
2007	World Championships	Osaka, Japan	29th	Heptathlon	5745 pts
2008	Hypo-Meeting	Götzis, Austria	15th	Heptathlon	6111 pts
2009	Hypo-Meeting	Götzis, Austria	13th	Heptathlon	5879 pts
2009	Universiade	Belgrade, Serbia	1st	Heptathlon	6004 pts
2009	World Championships	Berlin, Germany	17th	Heptathlon	5885 pts
2010	European Championships	Barcelona, Spain	9th	Heptathlon	6146 pts
2011	European Indoor Championship	Paris, France	5th	Pentathlon	4497 pts
2011	World Championships	Daegu, South Korea	16th	Heptathlon	6119 pts
2012	European Championships	Helsinki, Finland	5th	Heptathlon	6262 pts (PB)
2012	Olympic Games	London, United Kingdom	12th	Heptathlon	6300 pts (PB)
2014	European Championships	Zürich, Switzerland	–	Heptathlon	DNF
