= Anna Bogdanova =

Russian heptathlete

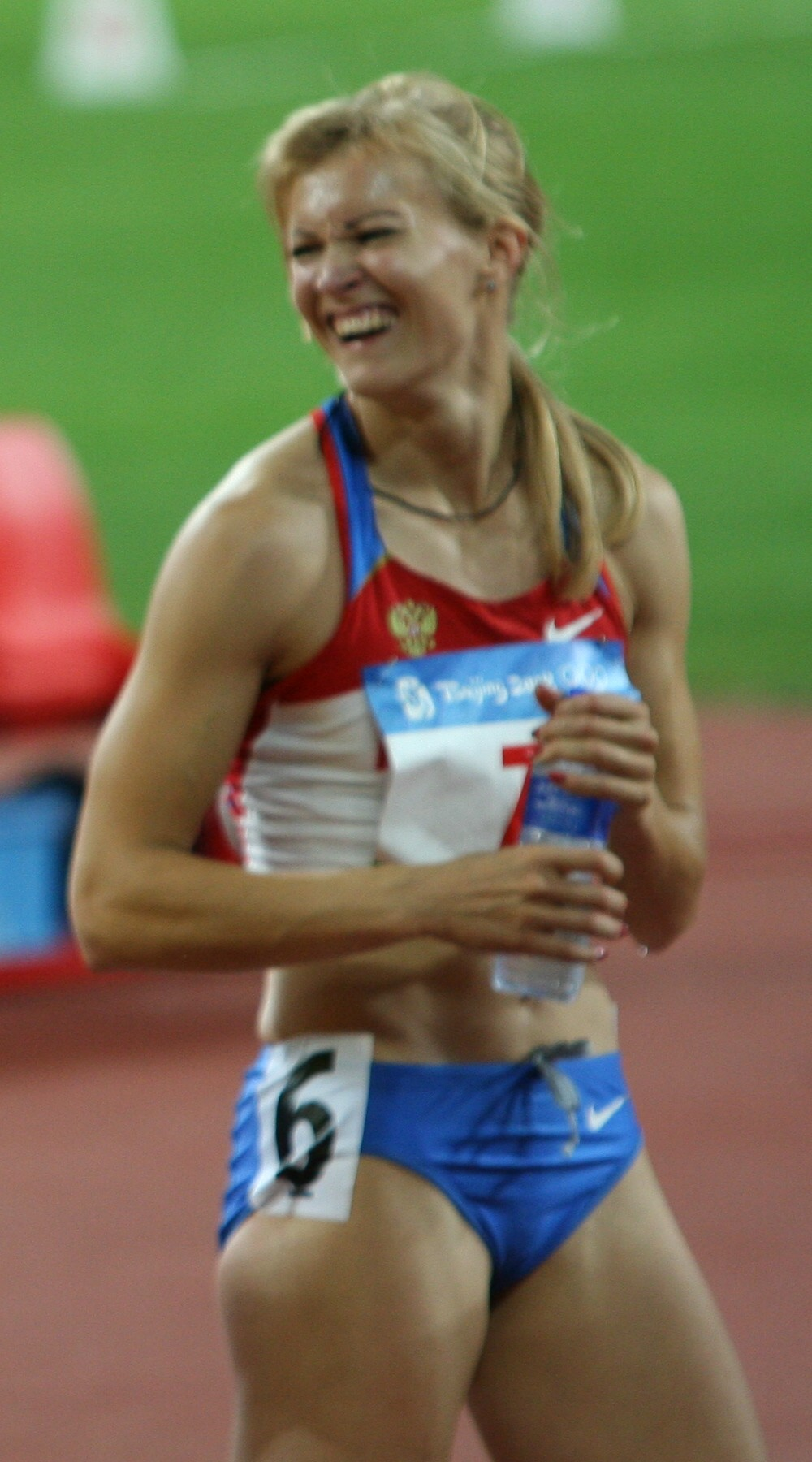
- Bogdanova at the 2008 Olympics

Medal record

Women's athletics

Representing Russia

World Indoor Championships
Bronze medal – third place	2008 Valencia	Pentathlon

European Indoor Championships
Gold medal – first place	2009 Torino	Pentathlon

Anna Bogdanova (born 21 October 1984) is a Russian heptathlete. Bogdanova was the bronze medallist at the 2008 IAAF World Indoor Championships and placed sixth at the 2008 Summer Olympics. She won at the European Athletics Indoor Championships the following year. In professional competitions she placed third at the 2008 Hypo-Meeting.

== International competitions ==
Representing Russia
Year	Competition	Venue	Position	Event	Result	Notes
2007	European Indoor Championships	Birmingham, United Kingdom	13th	Pentathlon	4272	
2007	World Championships	Osaka, Japan	10th	Heptathlon	6243	
2008	World Indoor Championships	Valencia, Spain	3rd	Pentathlon	4753	
2008	Olympic Games	Beijing, China	5th	Heptathlon	6465	Originally 7th before Lyudmila Blonska and Tatyana Chernova's disqualifications

== See also ==
- List of IAAF World Indoor Championships medalists (women)
- List of European Athletics Indoor Championships medalists (women)
