= Lionel Larry =

American sprinter (born 1986)

Personal information
- Born: September 14, 1986 (age 39) Compton, California, United States

Sport
- Sport: Track and field
Medal record
Representing the United States
World Championships
Gold medal – first place	2009 Berlin	4 × 400 m relay

Lionel Larry (born September 14, 1986) is an American sprinter who specializes in the 400 meters. Collegiately, he ran for the University of Southern California.

Larry won a gold medal at the 2009 World Championships after running in the preliminary heat of the 4 × 400 meter relay.
