= Marisa De Aniceto =

French track and field athlete

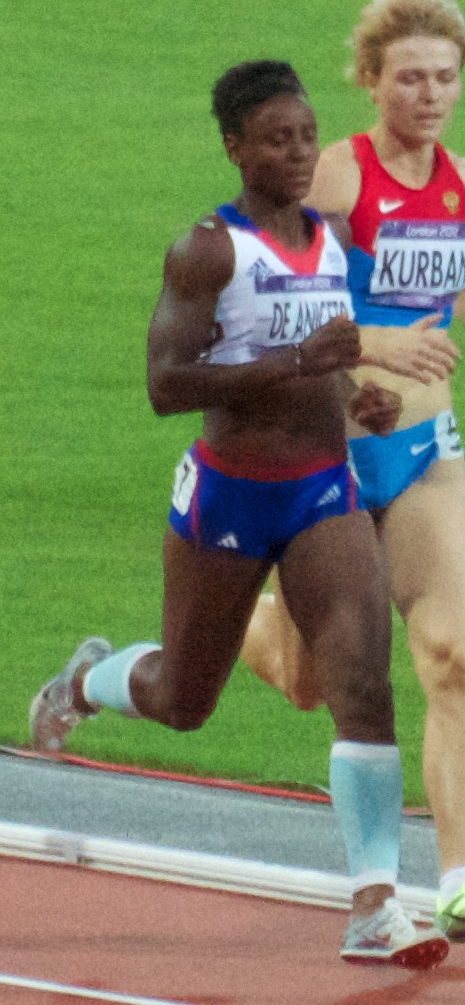
- Marisa De Aniceto at the 2012 Olympics

Personal information
- Nationality: France
- Born: 11 November 1986 (age 39) Luanda, Angola
- Height: 1.62 m (5 ft 4 in)
- Weight: 52 kg (115 lb)

Sport
- Sport: Athletics
- Event: Heptathlon
- Club: Montpellier Agglomération Athletic Méditerranée
- Coached by: Gerard Blanchier
- Updated on 31 March 2016

Marisa De Aniceto (born 11 November 1986 in Luanda) is a French track and field athlete. She competed at the 2012 Summer Olympics in the women's heptathlon event placing 21st.

== Biographie ==
In 2009, Marisa produced a score of 6080 points to win the French 2009 National Championships at Valence.

De Aniceto scored 6935 points at a women's decathlon in 2002 to set an under-17 world best in the event.

In May 2012, Marisa De Aniceto won the track meet at Tenerife and raised her personal best to 6182 points, meeting the standard for qualifying for the London Olympics.

== Prize List ==
International Places
Date	Competition	Location	Result	Points
2003	World Cadette Championships	Sherbrooke	1st	5458 pts
2005	World Junior Championships	Kaunas	11th	5037 pts
2007	European U23 Championships	Debrecen	12th	5878 pts
2009	Cup of Europe for combined events	Szczecin	5th	5982 pts
2009	World Championships	Berlin	11th	6049 pts
2010	Cup of Europe for combined events	Tallinn	2nd	6010 pts
2011	Cup of Europe for combined events	Toruń	8th	5696 pts
2012	London Olympics	London	21st	6030 pts

== Records ==
Personal Bests
Event	Performance	Location	Date
Heptathlon	6182 pts	Tenerife	27 May 2012
