= Diana Pickler =

American heptathlete

Diana Lynn Pickler (born December 9, 1983) is an American heptathlete from Shreveport, Louisiana. She has represented her country at the Olympic and World Championship levels and was the 2009 US heptathlon champion. Her twin sister, Julie Pickler, is also a track and field athlete.

== Career ==
Spending her amateur career with Washington State University, she won her first major national honours in 2001, taking the national junior championship in the heptathlon. Track and Field News rated her as the country's top junior heptathlete that year. She represented the United States at the 2002 World Junior Championships in Athletics but finished in 15th place with 4539 points, well below her season's best of 5365.

The 2003 and 2004 seasons were uneventful but she matured as a senior athlete the following two seasons, taking sixth place in the NCAA championships in 2005 and improving to third place in 2006. She also finished fifth at the national outdoor championships that year. The 2007 season represented a significant progression: her personal best reached over 6000 points for the first time and she was ranked as the number one American heptathlete by Track and Field News. She was runner-up at the national outdoor championships, and also runner-up in the indoor championships in the pentathlon. She was part of the American team for the 2007 World Championships and, although she finished 25th, it was the best performance by an American in the event.

After taking third at the 2008 Olympic trials with a personal best of 6,257 points, she represented the United States at the 2008 Summer Olympics. However, she strained her hamstring in the first event (100 meter hurdles) and failed to finish the competition. At the 2009 national championships, an injury to the favourite Hyleas Fountain resulted in Pickler's first senior national title. She took first place with event bests in the 800 meters and shot put, and a personal heptathlon best of 6290 points, finishing ahead of Sharon Day and Bettie Wade.

== Other appearances ==
Pickler appeared at the 7th KUNOICHI competition (known in the US as Women of Ninja Warrior) in the summer of 2007, but failed on the Log Jam in the first stage when her foot hit the water as she tried to climb back onto a log after losing her balance.

== Statistics ==
=== Personal bests ===
Event	Best	Venue	Year	Notes
100 meter hurdles	13.25 secs	Sacramento, California, United States	June 7, 2007	
High jump	1.84 m	Austin, Texas, United States	April 4, 2007	
Shot put	13.49 m	Eugene, Oregon, United States	June 27, 2009	
200 meters	24.07 secs	Indianapolis, Indiana, United States	June 21, 2007	
Long jump	6.36 m	Desenzano, Italy	May 11, 2008	
Javelin	44.03 m	Palo Alto, California, United States	May 6, 2007	
800 meters	2:16.59 mins	Eugene, Oregon, United States	June 28, 2009	
Heptathlon	6257 pts	Eugene, Oregon, United States	June 28, 2009	

- All information taken from IAAF profile.

=== Competition record ===
Year	Competition	Venue	Position	Event	Notes
Representing the United States
2002	World Junior Championships	Kingston, Jamaica	15th	Heptathlon	4539 pts
2007	World Championships	Osaka, Japan	25th	Heptathlon	5838 pts
2008	Olympic Games	Beijing, China	—	Heptathlon	DNF

== KUNOICHI record ==
- 7th competition (99) - Failed Log Jam - First Stage
