= Argyro Strataki =

Greek heptathlete (born 1975)

Argyro Strataki (Greek: Αργυρώ Στρατάκη, born 3 August 1975 in Heraklion) is a Greek former heptathlete. She represented her country at the Olympic Games in 2004 and 2008. She was also a four-time participant at the World Championships in Athletics and a three-time competitor at the European Athletics Championships. Her personal best for the heptathlon is 6235 points – a Greek record.

Her sole major international medal was a silver at the 2005 Mediterranean Games. Strataki won six Greek title in the heptathlon from 1998 to 2006, She was also a five-time winner of the women's pentathlon at the Greek Indoor Championships.

== International competitions ==
Year	Competition	Venue	Position	Notes
Representing Greece
2002	European Championships	Munich, Germany	16th	Heptathlon
2003	World Championships	Paris, France	9th	Heptathlon
2004	Olympic Games	Athens, Greece	15th	Heptathlon
2005	Mediterranean Games	Almería, Spain	2nd	Heptathlon
2005	World Championships	Helsinki, Finland	17th	Heptathlon
2006	European Championships	Gothenburg, Sweden	9th	Heptathlon
2007	European Indoor Championships	Birmingham, United Kingdom	8th	Pentathlon
2007	World Championships	Osaka, Japan	18th	Heptathlon

== Personal bests ==
- Heptathlon - 6235 pts (2006)
- 200 metres - 24.35 s (2004)
- 800 metres - 2:14.77 min (2006)
- 100 metres hurdles - 13.51 s (2003)
- High jump - 1.79 m (2003)
- Long jump - 6.34 m (2006)
- Shot put - 14.08 m (2003)
- Javelin throw - 46.88 m (2004)
