= Hyleas Fountain =

American heptathlete (born 1981)

Personal information
- Nationality: American
- Born: Hyleas Fountain; January 14, 1981 (age 45)
- Height: 1.70 m (5 ft 7 in)
- Weight: 64 kg (141 lb)

Sport
- Country: United States
- Sport: Athletics
- Event(s): Heptathlon, 60 metres hurdles, Long Jump
- College team: University of Georgia
- Coached by: Lynn Smith
Medal record
Olympic Games
Silver medal – second place	2008 Beijing	Heptathlon
- Updated on 4 August 2012

Hyleas Fountain (born January 14, 1981) is an American heptathlete. She was the silver medalist in the event at the 2008 Beijing Olympics.

== Career ==
=== Early years ===
Fountain was born in Columbus, Georgia, and was a member of the 1992 Harrisburg Parks and Recreation track club under coach Horace Camero, until 1994 Greater Paxtonia Track Club under coach Darnell L Williams. She attended Central Dauphin East High School in Harrisburg, Pennsylvania, where she was under the coaching of Al Moten, Fred Leuschner, Jim Seidler, and Braden Cook. She then continued her career at Barton Community College (Kansas) under Coach Lance Brauman of PURE Athletics Inc and then going to the University of Georgia under coach Wayne Norton. Fountain has won NCAA championships in both the heptathlon and long jump.

=== 2005-2006 ===
She finished 12th at the 2005 World Championships and eighth at the 2006 World Indoor Championships.

=== 2008 ===
In 2008, Fountain qualified for the 2008 Summer Olympics by winning the U.S. Olympic Trials with a personal best score of 6667 points in the heptathlon. Fountain set personal bests in five of the seven heptathlon events at the Trials.

At the Olympics themselves, she originally finished in the bronze medal position. However, after the silver medallist Lyudmila Blonska tested positive on her drug test, Fountain was elevated to the silver medal position.

=== 2009-2010 ===
Fountain seemed sure to qualify for the 2009 World Championships in Athletics after gaining a significant lead in the heptathlon at the US Championships (5193 points after five events). However, she injured her neck in the high jump event and aggravated the injury after a personal best long jump, thus ruling her out of the US and World Championships.

She finished fourth in the pentathlon at the 2010 IAAF World Indoor Championships, setting a personal record of 4753 points as well as setting indoor bests in the shot put, high jump and 800 meters. Later that year she took on reigning world champion Jessica Ennis in a three-event challenge at the Adidas Grand Prix. Although Fountain won only one of the events, she won the competition by merit of having the greatest points total.

=== 2011 ===
She led the 2011 World Championships in Daegu, South Korea after 2 events, but then fell away and pulled out of the final event (800 meters) without announcing why.

=== 2012 ===
Qualified for the 2012 London Olympics on June 30, 2012.

In the Heptathlon at the London 2012 Olympics, Hyleas was competitive up until a disappointing Long Jump, where she began to suffer from lower back pains. She continued into the Javelin but was only able to make a non-competitive performance. She did not compete in the 800 metres and while finishing with the highest incomplete score, officially registered a DNF.

== Personal bests (outdoor) ==
Event	Performance	Location	Date
Heptathlon	6735	Des Moines	06-26-2010
200 meters	23.21 (0.3 m/s)	Beijing	08-15-2008
800 meters	2:15.32	Talence	09-14-2008
100 meters hurdles	12.70 (1.3 m/s)	London	08-03-2012
High jump	1.90	Des Moines	06-25-2010
Long jump	6.89 (0.6 m/s)	Luzern	07-15-2009
Javelin throw	48.15	Eugene	06-28-2008
Shot put	13.81	Eugene	06-27-2009

Last updated 14 January 2015.
