= List of awards and nominations received by Jessica Ennis-Hill =

Jessica Ennis-Hill awards and nominations
Awards and nominations
Award	Wins	Nominations
BBC Sports Personality of the Year Awards	1	4
British AWA Awards	7	0
British SJA Awards	6	2
British Athletics Yearly Awards	2	0
Commonwealth Sports Awards	1	0
European Athletics Yearly Awards	2	2
World Athletics Yearly Awards	0	3
World Laureus Sports Awards	1	3
Other Awards	30	8

Totals (Note: Certain award groups do not simply award one winner. They acknowledge several different recipients, have runners-up, and have third place. Since this is a specific recognition and is different from losing an award, runner-up mentions are considered wins in this award tally. For simplification and to avoid errors, each award in this list has been presumed to have had a prior nomination.)
- Wins: 50
- Nominations: 22

This is a list of awards and nominations received by the British track and field athlete Jessica Ennis-Hill.

A former world and Commonwealth Sportswoman of the Year, Ennis is also a former European Athlete (both at senior & under-23 level) of the Year. She is a joint-record four-time British Sportswoman (tied with Paula Radcliffe) and record six-time British Athlete of the Year as well.

== Athletics Weekly ==
Year	Category	Nominated for	Result	Ref.
2015	International Female	Heptathlon	Won	
2015	British Female	Heptathlon	Won	
2016	British Female	Heptathlon	Won	

== British Athletics / UKA ==
Year	Category	Nominated for	Result	Ref.
2010	The Best British Athletic Performance of 2010	Heptathlon and Pentathlon	Won	
2012	British Olympic Athlete of the Year	Heptathlon and Pentathlon	Won	

== British Athletics Writers' Association ==
Year	Category	Nominated for	Result	Ref.
2009	Best Performance	Heptathlon	Won	
2009	Athlete of the Year	Heptathlon and Pentathlon	Won	
2010	Athlete of the Year	Heptathlon and Pentathlon	Won	
2011	Athlete of the Year	Heptathlon and Pentathlon	Won	
2012	Athlete of the Year	Heptathlon and Pentathlon	Won	
2015	Athlete of the Year	Heptathlon	Won	
2016	Athlete of the Year	Heptathlon	Won	

== British Broadcasting Corporation ==
=== BBC Sports Personality of the Year ===
Year	Category	Nominated for	Result	Ref.
2009	Sports Personality of the Year	Track and field	3rd	
2010	Sports Personality of the Year	Track and field	3rd	
2012	Sports Personality of the Year	Track and field	2nd	
2015	Sports Personality of the Year	Track and field	3rd	
2017	Lifetime Achievement	Track and field	Won	

=== BBC Yorkshire ===
Year	Category	Nominated for	Result	Ref.
2007	Best Senior Female Performance	Track and field	Won	
2009	Yorkshire Sports Personality of the Year	Track and field	Won	

=== BBC's Sports Relief ===
Year	Category	Nominated for	Result	Ref.
2016	Britain's Favourite Sporting Hero	Track and field	Won	
2016	Scotland's Favourite Sporting Hero	Track and field	2nd	

== BEDSA / Sporting Equals ==
Year	Category	Nominated for	Result	Ref.
2016	Sportswoman of the Year	Track and field	Won	
2017	Sportswoman of the Year	Track and field	Nominated	

== BT Sport ==
=== Action Woman Awards ===
Year	Category	Nominated for	Result	Ref.
2015	Action Woman of the Year	Track and field	Nominated	

=== Industry Awards ===
Year	Category	Nominated for	Result	Ref.
2017	Outstanding Contribution to Sport	Track and field	Won	

== Commonwealth Sports Awards ==
Year	Category	Nominated for	Result	Ref.
2010	Outstanding Female Athlete	Track and field	Won	

== Cosmopolitan Ultimate Women Awards ==
Year	Category	Nominated for	Result	Ref.
2009	Ultimate Sports Star	Track and field	Won	
2010	Ultimate Sports Star	Track and field	Won	
2012	Ultimate Olympian	Track and field	Won	

== Dame Marea Hartman Award ==
Year	Category	Nominated for	Result	Ref.
2010	Outstanding English Female Athlete of the Year	Heptathlon	Won	

== European Athletics ==
=== Yearly awards ===
Year	Category	Nominated for	Result	Ref.
2007	Rising Star	Heptathlon and Pentathlon	Won	
2010	Athlete of the Year	Heptathlon and Pentathlon	2nd place	
2012	Athlete of the Year	Heptathlon and Pentathlon	Won	
2015	Athlete of the Year	Heptathlon	Nominated	

=== Monthly awards ===
Year	Month	Category	Nominated for	Result	Ref.
2009	May	European Athlete of the Month	Heptathlon	Won	
2010	January	European Athlete of the Month	Pentathlon	Won	
2010	March	European Athlete of the Month	Pentathlon	Won	
2010	May	European Athlete of the Month	Heptathlon	Won	
2011	January	European Athlete of the Month	Pentathlon	Won	
2012	May	European Athlete of the Month	Heptathlon	Won	
2016	June	European Athlete of the Month	Heptathlon	Won	

== Glamour Awards ==
Year	Category	Nominated for	Result	Ref.
2011	Sportswoman of the Year	Track and field	Won	
2015	Sports Person of the Year	Track and field	Nominated	

== Harper's Bazaar's Women of the Year Awards ==
Year	Category	Nominated for	Result	Ref.
2012	British Ambassadors of the Year (Note: Award shared with Victoria Pendleton and Ellie Simmonds.)	London Olympics & Paralympics	Won	

== Jaguar Academy of Sport Awards ==
Year	Category	Nominated for	Result	Ref.
2010	British Sporting Performance of the Year	Track and field	Nominated	
2010	Most Inspirational Sportswoman of the Year	Track and field	Won	
2012	Most Inspirational Sportswoman of the Year	Track and field	Won	

== Laureus World Sports Awards ==
Year	Category	Nominated for	Result	Ref.
2010	Comeback of the Year	Track and field	Nominated	
2011	Sportswoman of the Year	Track and field	Nominated	
2013	Sportswoman of the Year	Track and field	Won	
2016	Comeback of the Year	Track and field	Nominated	

== Lottoland ==
Year	Category	Nominated for	Result	Ref.
2023	The 20 Most Inspirational Sportswomen	Track and field	Won	

== MBNA Northern Sports Awards ==
Year	Category	Nominated for	Result	Ref.
2011	Sportswoman of the Year (Note: Inaugural winner of the award.)	Heptathlon	Won	

== MOBO Awards ==
Year	Category	Nominated for	Result	Ref.
2024	Paving The Way	Herself	Won	

== The Guardian ==
Year	Category	Nominated for	Result	Ref.
2014	50 Most Influential Women in British Sport	Track and field	3rd	

=== The Observer Sport monthly awards ===
Year	Category	Nominated for	Result	Ref.
2009	Sportsperson of the year	Track and field	Won	

== SJA British Sports Awards ==
Year	Category	Nominated for	Result	Ref.
2009	Sportswoman of the Year	Track and field	Won	
2010	Sportswoman of the Year	Track and field	Won	
2011	Sportswoman of the Year	Track and field	Nominated	
2012	Sportswoman of the Year	Track and field	Won	
2012	Outstanding Performance	Track and field	Won	
2015	Sportswoman of the Year	Track and field	Won	
2016	Sportswoman of the Year	Track and field	Nominated	
2020	Greatest Sportswoman	Track and field	Won	

== Sunday Times Sportswomen Awards ==
Year	Category	Nominated for	Result	Ref.
2009	Sportswoman of the Year	Track and field	2nd place	
2010	Sportswoman of the Year	Track and field	Nominated	
2012	Sportswoman of the Year	Track and field	Won	
2015	Sportswoman of the Year	Track and field	Won	

== William Hill Sportswoman Award ==
Year	Category	Nominated for	Result	Ref.
2011	Sportswoman of the Year	Track and field	Nominated	
2012	Sportswoman of the Year	Track and field	Won	

== Women's Health ==
Year	Category	Nominated for	Result	Ref.
2012	The 20 Most Inspirational Sportswomen	Track and field	Won	

== World Athletics / IAAF ==
Year	Category	Nominated for	Result	Ref.
2010	Female Athlete of the Year	Heptathlon and Pentathlon	Nominated	
2012	Female Athlete of the Year	Heptathlon and Pentathlon	Nominated	
2015	Female Athlete of the Year	Heptathlon	Longlisted	

== Yorkshire Society ==
Year	Category	Nominated for	Result	Ref.
2009	Sporting Achievement	Track and field	Won	

== Other awards ==
=== Hall of Fames ===
- BUCS Hall of Fame, inducted in 2019. (Note: First ever inductee.)
- England Athletics Hall of Fame, inducted in 2018.
- English Institute of Sport Hall of Fame (Note: Had a third accolade added in December 2015 (a commemorative photo).)

=== Other accolades ===
- In 2009, received a Gold Badge, and in 2015, received a Sport Badge from Blue Peter.
- In April 2010, received the Ian Wooldridge Award.
- In 2011, unveiled on the Sheffield Legends 'Walk of Fame'.
- In July 2011, a lifesize model of Ennis was unveiled at Madame Tussaud's in London.
- In September 2012, Sheffield City Council voted unanimously to award her the Freedom of the City of Sheffield.
- In October 2012, unveiled on Sheffield Winter Garden 'Wall of Fame' in 2012.
- In November 2012, new sports hall at Chesterfield College named after and opened by Ennis.
- In 2016, was included on the list for the entertainment section of Forbes Magazine's 30 under 30 list for Europe in January.
- In 2017, unveiled on the first British Universities and Colleges Sport (BUCS) 'Walk of Fame' in 217.
- In 2024, a permanent commemorative paving stone was unveiled outside the English Institute of Sport in her honour.
