= Athletics at the 2006 Commonwealth Games – Women's heptathlon =

Women's heptathlon at the Commonwealth Games

The women's heptathlon event at the 2006 Commonwealth Games was held on March 21–22.

== Medalists ==
Gold	Silver	Bronze
Kelly Sotherton; England	Kylie Wheeler; Australia	Jessica Ennis; England

== Results ==
=== 100 metres hurdles ===
Wind:
Heat 1: +2.0 m/s, Heat 2: +0.5 m/s

Rank	Heat	Name	Nationality	Time	Points	Notes
1	1	Jessica Zelinka	Canada	13.08	1112	PB
2	1	Kelly Sotherton	England	13.29	1081	PB
3	1	Jessica Ennis	England	13.32	1077	
4	1	Kylie Wheeler	Australia	13.63	1031	PB
5	1	Janice Josephs	South Africa	13.65	1028	SB
6	2	Julie Hollman	England	13.85	1000	SB
7	1	Javur Shobha	India	13.94	987	
8	2	Sarah Cowley	New Zealand	13.96	984	PB
9	2	Susmita Singha Roy	India	14.01	977	PB
10	2	Soma Biswas	India	14.02	976	SB
11	2	Rebecca Wardell	New Zealand	14.20	950	
12	2	Jane Jamieson	Australia	14.23	946	SB

=== High jump ===
Rank	Athlete	Nationality	1.43	1.46	1.49	1.52	1.55	1.58	1.61	1.64	1.67	1.70	1.73	1.76	1.79	1.82	1.85	1.88	1.91	1.94	Result	Points	Notes	Overall
1	Jessica Ennis	England	–	–	–	–	–	–	–	–	–	o	o	o	o	o	o	o	xo	xxx	1.91	1119	PB	2196
2	Kelly Sotherton	England	–	–	–	–	–	–	–	–	–	o	o	o	o	xo	xo	xxx			1.85	1041		2122
3	Kylie Wheeler	Australia	–	–	–	–	–	–	–	–	o	–	o	o	xo	o	xxx				1.82	1003		2034
4	Julie Hollman	England	–	–	–	–	–	–	–	–	o	o	o	o	o	xo	xxx				1.82	1003		2003
5	Jane Jamieson	Australia	–	–	–	–	–	–	o	–	o	o	xxo	o	xxo	xo	xxx				1.82	1003		1949
6	Jessica Zelinka	Canada	–	–	–	–	–	–	–	o	o	o	xo	xxo	xxx						1.76	928	SB	2040
7	Susmita Singha Roy	India	–	–	–	–	–	–	o	o	o	o	xxx								1.70	855		1832
8	Sarah Cowley	New Zealand	–	–	–	–	–	o	–	o	o	xxo	xxx								1.70	855		1839
9	Janice Josephs	South Africa	–	–	–	–	–	o	o	o	xxo	xxo	xxx								1.70	855		1883
10	Soma Biswas	India	–	–	–	–	o	o	xxo	o	xxx										1.64	783	SB	1759
11	Rebecca Wardell	New Zealand	–	–	o	o	xo	o	xo	xo	xxx										1.64	783	PB	1733
12	Javur Shobha	India	o	o	o	o	o	xo	xxx												1.58	712		1699

=== Shot put ===
Rank	Athlete	Nationality	#1	#2	#3	Result	Points	Notes	Overall
1	Jessica Zelinka	Canada	14.18	x	12.95	14.18	806	PB	2846
2	Kelly Sotherton	England	13.40	13.32	13.74	13.74	777		2899
3	Jane Jamieson	Australia	13.23	13.31	13.10	13.31	748	SB	2697
4	Rebecca Wardell	New Zealand	13.14	13.16	x	13.16	738	PB	2471
5	Kylie Wheeler	Australia	11.80	11.91	13.04	13.04	730		2764
6	Javur Shobha	India	12.24	12.12	12.37	12.37	686		2385
7	Soma Biswas	India	11.96	12.35	12.35	12.35	684		2443
8	Jessica Ennis	England	11.66	11.87	11.62	11.87	653		2849
9	Janice Josephs	South Africa	11.79	11.40	x	11.79	647		2530
10	Julie Hollman	England	11.09	x	11.63	11.63	637		2640
11	Sarah Cowley	New Zealand	10.60	x	x	10.60	569		2408
12	Susmita Singha Roy	India	10.53	10.38	x	10.53	564		2396

=== 200 metres ===
Wind:
Heat 1: +0.9 m/s, Heat 2: +0.6 m/s

Rank	Heat	Name	Nationality	Time	Points	Notes	Overall
1	1	Janice Josephs	South Africa	23.42	1037	SB	3567
2	1	Kelly Sotherton	England	23.56	1023	PB	3922
3	1	Jessica Ennis	England	23.80	1000	PB	3849
4	1	Jessica Zelinka	Canada	23.80	978	PB	3824
5	1	Kylie Wheeler	Australia	24.46	937		3701
6	2	Julie Hollman	England	24.82	937		3543
7	2	Rebecca Wardell	New Zealand	25.05	937		3353
8	1	Javur Shobha	India	25.12	876		3261
9	2	Soma Biswas	India	25.47	876	SB	3287
10	2	Sarah Cowley	New Zealand	26.00	797		3205
11	2	Jane Jamieson	Australia	26.63	743		3440
	2	Susmita Singha Roy	India	DQ	0		2396

=== Long jump ===
Rank	Athlete	Nationality	#1	#2	#3	Result	Points	Notes	Overall
1	Kylie Wheeler	Australia	6.18	6.18	6.52	6.52	1014	SB	4715
2	Kelly Sotherton	England	6.37	x	6.51	6.51	1010		4932
3	Janice Josephs	South Africa	6.20	6.22	6.12	6.22	918	SB	4485
4	Julie Hollman	England	x	x	6.17	6.17	902		4445
5	Jessica Ennis	England	6.05	6.15	6.11	6.15	896		4745
6	Susmita Singha Roy	India	5.91	5.95	x	5.95	834		3230
7	Javur Shobha	India	5.52	5.80	5.49	5.80	789		4050
8	Jessica Zelinka	Canada	x	x	5.78	5.78	783		4607
9	Rebecca Wardell	New Zealand	5.38	5.50	5.77	5.77	780		4133
10	Jane Jamieson	Australia	5.75	5.67	x	5.75	774		4214
11	Soma Biswas	India	5.51	5.61	5.60	5.61	732		4019
12	Sarah Cowley	New Zealand	x	5.53	5.26	5.53	709		3914

=== Javelin throw ===
Rank	Athlete	Nationality	#1	#2	#3	Result	Points	Notes	Overall
1	Rebecca Wardell	New Zealand	48.48	42.01	46.41	48.48	831	PB	4964
2	Jane Jamieson	Australia	42.31	45.98	42.65	45.98	782	SB	4996
3	Janice Josephs	South Africa	40.40	42.42	43.77	43.77	740	PB	5225
4	Julie Hollman	England	37.60	42.80	x	42.80	721	PB	5166
5	Soma Biswas	India	41.99	41.34	37.41	41.99	706		4725
6	Javur Shobha	India	39.21	40.92	41.52	41.52	696		4746
7	Jessica Zelinka	Canada	x	x	39.22	39.22	652		5259
8	Kylie Wheeler	Australia	37.88	33.73	34.70	37.88	627	PB	5342
9	Jessica Ennis	England	31.01	36.39	33.17	36.39	598	PB	5343
10	Susmita Singha Roy	India	33.12	x	31.35	33.12	536		3766
11	Kelly Sotherton	England	30.70	31.98	32.04	32.04	515		5447
	Sarah Cowley	New Zealand	x	x	x	NM	0		3914

=== 800 metres ===
Rank	Heat	Name	Nationality	Time	Points	Notes
1	2	Janice Josephs	South Africa	2:10.61	956	PB
2	2	Kylie Wheeler	Australia	2:10.62	956	SB
3	2	Jessica Zelinka	Canada	2:10.75	954	PB
4	2	Kelly Sotherton	England	2:11.08	949	
5	2	Jessica Ennis	England	2:12.66	926	
6	1	Rebecca Wardell	New Zealand	2:15.80	881	PB
7	1	Soma Biswas	India	2:18.24	848	
8	2	Julie Hollman	England	2:19.09	836	
9	1	Sarah Cowley	New Zealand	2:20.25	820	
10	1	Javur Shobha	India	2:22.71	787	
11	1	Susmita Singha Roy	India	2:33.11	654	
	1	Jane Jamieson	Australia	DNS	0	

=== Final standings ===
The highest mark recorded in each event is highlighted in yellow

Rank	Athlete	Nationality	100m H	HJ	SP	200m	LJ	JT	800m	Points	Notes
1st place, gold medalist(s)	Kelly Sotherton	England	13.29	1.85	13.74	23.56	6.51	32.04	2:11.08	6396	
2nd place, silver medalist(s)	Kylie Wheeler	Australia	13.63	1.82	13.04	24.46	6.52	37.88	2:10.62	6298	PB
3rd place, bronze medalist(s)	Jessica Ennis	England	13.32	1.91	11.87	23.80	6.15	36.39	2:12.66	6269	PB
4	Jessica Zelinka	Canada	13.08	1.76	14.18	24.03	5.78	39.22	2:10.75	6213	PB
5	Janice Josephs	South Africa	13.65	1.70	11.79	23.42	6.22	43.77	2:10.61	6181	PB
6	Julie Hollman	England	13.85	1.82	11.63	24.82	6.17	42.80	2:19.09	6002	
7	Rebecca Wardell	New Zealand	14.20	1.64	13.16	25.05	5.77	48.48	2:15.80	5845	PB
8	Soma Biswas	India	14.02	1.64	12.35	25.47	5.61	41.99	2:18.24	5573	SB
9	Javur Shobha	India	13.94	1.58	12.37	25.12	5.80	41.52	2:22.71	5533	
10	Sarah Cowley	New Zealand	13.96	1.70	10.60	26.00	5.53	NM	2:20.25	4734	
11	Susmita Singha Roy	India	14.01	1.70	10.53	DQ	5.95	33.12	2:33.11	4420	
	Jane Jamieson	Australia	14.23	1.82	13.31	26.63	5.75	45.98	DNS	DNF	
