= Jessica Ennis-Hill =

British track and field athlete (born 1986)

Dame Jessica Ennis-Hill DBE
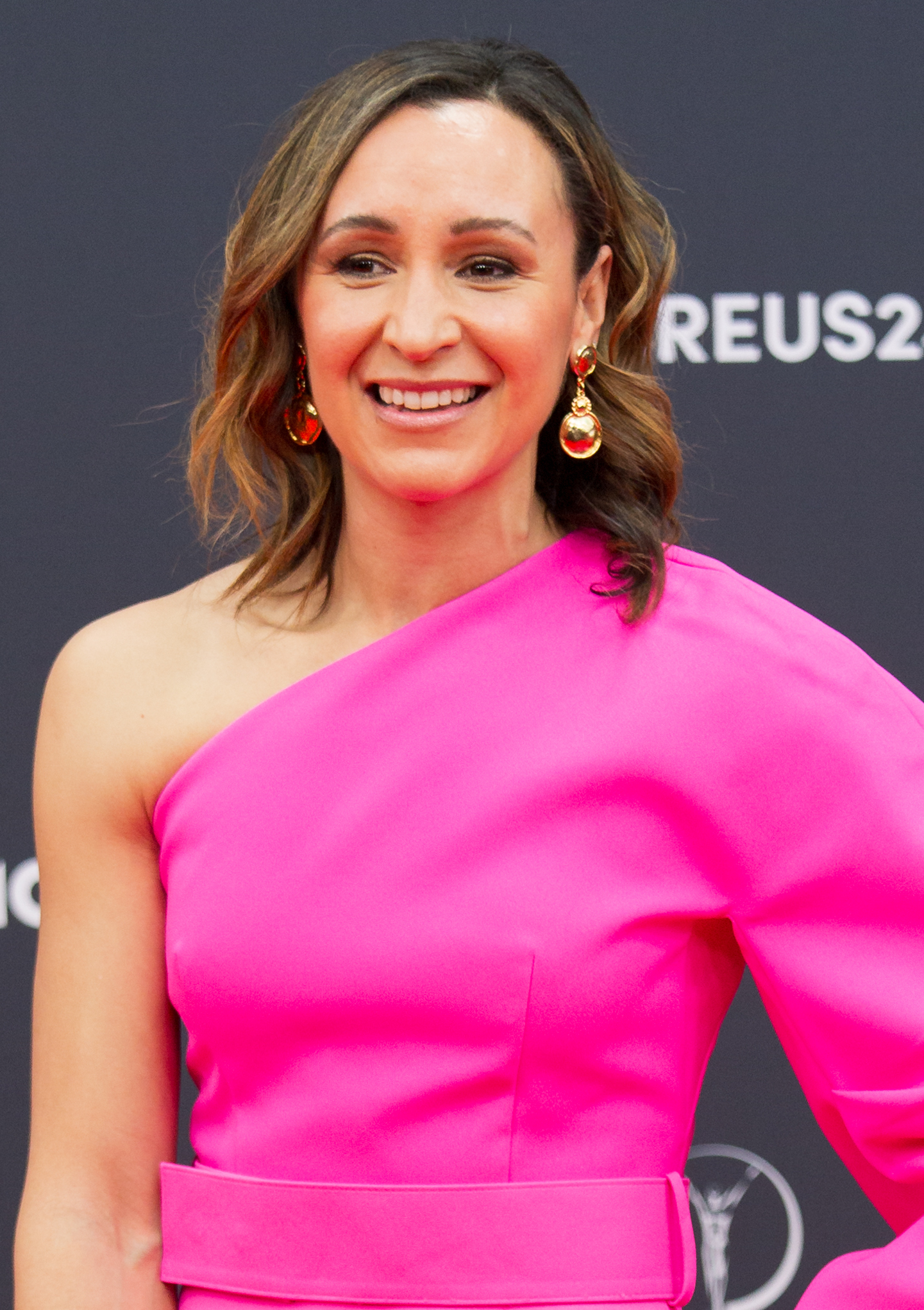
- Ennis-Hill at the 25th Laureus World Sports Awards in 2024

Personal information
- Born: Jessica Ennis; 28 January 1986 (age 40) Sheffield, South Yorkshire, England
- Education: University of Sheffield
- Height: 1.65 m (5 ft 5 in)
- Weight: 57 kg (126 lb)
- Spouse: Andy Hill (m. 2013)
- Ennis-Hill's voice from the BBC programme Woman's Hour (8 November 2012)

Sport
- Country: Great Britain; England
- Sport: Athletics
- Events: Heptathlon, Pentathlon, 100 m hurdles
- Club: City of Sheffield Athletic Club
- Turned pro: 2005
- Coached by: Antonio 'Tony' Minichiello
- Retired: 2016

Achievements and titles
- Olympic finals: 2012, Gold; 2016, Silver
- World finals: 2007, 4th 2009, Gold; 2011, Gold; 2015, Gold
- Highest world ranking: Heptathlon: 1 (2009, 2010, 2012)
- Personal bests: Heptathlon: 6955 points Pentathlon: 4965 points
Medal record
Women's athletics
Event	1st	2nd	3rd
Olympic Games	1	1	0
World Championships	3	0	0
World Indoor Championships	1	1	0
European Championships	1	0	0
Commonwealth Games	0	0	1
European Cup Combined Events	2	0	0
Universiade	0	0	1
European U23 Championships	0	0	1
European Junior Championships	1	0	0
Commonwealth Youth Games	0	2	0
Total	9	4	3
Representing Great Britain
Olympic Games
Gold medal – first place	2012 London	Heptathlon
Silver medal – second place	2016 Rio de Janeiro	Heptathlon
World Championships
Gold medal – first place	2009 Berlin	Heptathlon
Gold medal – first place	2011 Daegu	Heptathlon
Gold medal – first place	2015 Beijing	Heptathlon
World Indoor Championships
Gold medal – first place	2010 Doha	Pentathlon
Silver medal – second place	2012 Istanbul	Pentathlon
European Championships
Gold medal – first place	2010 Barcelona	Heptathlon
Universiade
Bronze medal – third place	2005 İzmir	Heptathlon
European U23 Championships
Bronze medal – third place	2007 Debrecen	100 m hurdles
European Jnr Championships
Gold medal – first place	2005 Kaunas	Heptathlon
Representing England
Commonwealth Games
Bronze medal – third place	2006 Melbourne	Heptathlon
Commonwealth Youth Games
Silver medal – second place	2004 Bendigo	100 m hurdles
Silver medal – second place	2004 Bendigo	High jump

Dame Jessica Ennis-Hill (née Ennis; born 28 January 1986) is a British retired athlete who specialised in the heptathlon and 100 metres hurdles. As a competitor in heptathlon, she is the 2012 Olympic champion, a three-time world champion (2009, 2011, 2015), and the 2010 European champion. She is also the 2010 World Indoor pentathlon champion. A member of the City of Sheffield & Dearne athletic club, she is a former British national record holder for the heptathlon. She is also a former British record holder in the 100 metres hurdles, the high jump and the indoor pentathlon.

Since retiring from athletic competition, Ennis-Hill has appeared as an athletics commentator and studio pundit for the BBC. She has also worked as an entrepreneur and created several fitness apps specialising in women's health and training.

== Early life and family ==
Born in Sheffield on 28 January 1986, Ennis-Hill is one of two daughters of Vinnie Ennis and Alison Powell. She has a younger sister, Carmel. Her father is a Jamaican self-employed painter and decorator, who was born in Linstead in the parish of St. Catherine and migrated to Sheffield, England at 13 years old. Her English mother is a social worker from Derbyshire. Her father did some sprinting at school, whilst her mother favoured the high jump.

They introduced her to athletics by taking her to a Start:Track event at the Don Valley Stadium during the 1996 school summer holidays. She won her first athletics prize, a pair of trainers. There she met Toni Minichiello, who was to become her coach.

Ennis-Hill took to the sport immediately and joined the City of Sheffield and Dearne Athletic Club the following year, at the age of 11. In November 2000, at the age of 14, she won the Sheffield Federation for School Sports Whitham Award for the best performance by a Sheffield athlete at the National Schools Championships, where she won the high jump competition. Growing up in the Highfield area of Sheffield, Ennis attended Sharrow Primary School and King Ecgbert School in Dore, where she took her GCSEs and moved on to the sixth form, where she studied three A-Levels, before going on to study psychology at the University of Sheffield, graduating in 2007 with a 2:2.

Ennis's full-time coach throughout her career was UK Athletics national coach for combined events Antonio 'Toni' Minichiello, who coached her since she was eleven years old. She also received specialist javelin coaching from World Championships bronze medallist and European Championships silver medallist Mick Hill.

=== Junior competitions ===
Ennis took part in athletics from a young age. She competed in the high jump and pentathlon at the English Schools AAA Junior Girls in 1999, and was 2nd with a PB score, she then won the AAA Girls title in the high jump the following year at the age of fourteen, clearing 1.70 metres. In 2000, she won the Sheffield Federation for School Sports Whitham Award. In 2001, she was runner-up at the high jump and heptathlon events in the English Schools AAA Intermediate section and won the high jump in 2002 with a jump of 1.80 metres. Ennis established herself as one of Britain's top junior athletes at the AAA U20 Championships in 2003 as she took the indoor pentathlon title and outdoor 100 m hurdles title.

Ennis competed at the 2003 World Youth Championships in Sherbrooke, Quebec, Canada in July, where after leading at the end of the first day she finished in fifth position with 5,311 points.

The following year Ennis competed in the 2004 World Junior Championships in Grosseto, Italy, where she finished eighth with 5,542 points, again after leading at the end of the first day. Ennis won two silver medals, in the 100 m hurdles and the high jump, at the 2004 Commonwealth Youth Games in Bendigo, Australia, held in November and December 2004, and won the heptathlon at the July 2005 European Athletics Junior Championships in Kaunas, Lithuania, with a British junior record score of 5,891 points. She was the first Briton to win the heptathlon title.

== Professional athletics career ==
One of Ennis's first victories as a senior came in February 2004, when she was eighteen years old. She won the 60 m hurdles at the Northern Senior Indoor Championships in a time of 8.60 seconds. Two weeks earlier she had won three Northern Junior Indoor Championship titles: the 60 m sprint, the 60 m hurdles and the high jump. Also in February Ennis finished third in the 60 m hurdles at the AAA Indoor Championships in Sheffield in a time of 8.43 seconds. At the July 2005 AAA Championships Ennis competed in the 100 m hurdles, in which she recorded a personal best time of 13.26 seconds, and the high jump.

Ennis's first senior international competition was the 2005 Universiade, held in August in İzmir, Turkey, where she won a bronze medal in the heptathlon with a new personal best of 5,910 points, behind winner Lyudmila Blonska and second-placed Simeone Oberer.

=== 2006: First senior competition medal ===
Ennis won a bronze medal for England at the 2006 Commonwealth Games in Melbourne, Australia with a personal best score of 6,269 points, improving her previous best total by more than 350 points. Her high jump of 1.91 metres would have been enough to take the individual event gold medal. She achieved personal bests in the high jump, the 200 m and the javelin. Before the competition her aim was merely to score over 6,000 points. The competition was won by Kelly Sotherton with 6,396 points, with Kylie Wheeler second on 6,298 points.

At the AAA Championships in July, Ennis competed in the 100 m hurdles, in which she recorded a personal best time of 13.19 seconds in the heats. In July, Ennis helped the Great Britain women's team to a fourth-place finish in the overall competition at the European Cup Combined Events Super League competition in Arles, France with a combined points total of 17,454. Ennis finished fourth in the individual standings with a points total of 6,170.

Later in 2006 Ennis improved her personal best with a score of 6,287 points when finishing eighth at the 2006 European Championships in Gothenburg, Sweden. Ennis produced personal bests in the shot put, the 200 m and the javelin.

=== 2007: World Championships breakthrough ===
In January, Ennis set a new personal best of 8.24 seconds in the 60 m hurdles at the Loughborough indoor meeting, whilst in February, at the UK Indoor City Challenge Cup in Sheffield, she set personal bests of 7.43 seconds in the 60 m and 6.19 metres in the long jump.

Ennis finished sixth in the pentathlon at the European Indoor Championships in Birmingham, improving her personal best score by more than 300 points to 4,716. In May, she broke the British under-23 heptathlon record, set by Denise Lewis in 1994, by winning in Desenzano, Italy, with a score of 6,388 points. In doing so, Ennis equalled the British high jump record of 1.95 metres and recorded personal bests in the 100 metres hurdles (13.12 seconds) and the long jump (6.40 metres).

At the European U-23 Championships in Debrecen, Hungary in July, Ennis won a bronze medal in the 100 metres hurdles in a time of 13.09 seconds, behind winner Nevin Yanit and Christina Vukicevic. Later in July, Ennis beat Kelly Sotherton into second place in the European Cup Combined Events Super League competition in Szczecin, Poland, scoring 6,399 points, a personal best, beating her own British under-23 record. Ennis also led GB women to first place in the team competition. She set two lifetime bests in the process in the 800 metres and the javelin. At the end of July, Ennis won the 100 metres hurdles in a time of 13.25 seconds at the Norwich Union World Trials & British Championships.

In August, Ennis finished fourth at the 2007 World Championships in Athletics in Osaka, Japan, behind the winner Carolina Klüft, Lyudmyla Blonska and Kelly Sotherton, recording the fastest times in the three track events, including a personal best of 12.97 seconds in the 100 metres hurdles. Ennis finished second overall in the 2007 World Combined Events Challenge, a competition based on points accumulated at any three of the year's thirteen qualifying events, behind Blonska. The following year Blonska was banned for life for her second career doping offence. In September, Ennis won the inaugural "European Athletics Rising Star" Award.

=== 2008: Injury setback ===
In January, Ennis set new indoor personal bests of 8.18 seconds in the 60 metres hurdles and 6.33 metres in the long jump at the Norwich Union International Match at Kelvin Hall in Glasgow. At the Norwich Union Trials and UK Championships in Sheffield in early February, which she entered despite deciding not to compete in the World Indoor Championships in Valencia, Spain, Ennis finished third in the 60 metres hurdles in a time of 8.20 seconds and won the high jump with 1.92 metres.

Ennis withdrew from the heptathlon competition at the Hypo-Meeting in Götzis, Austria after the first day's events citing pain in her right foot. A scan later revealed the injury as stress fractures of the navicular and a metatarsal of the right foot. As a consequence she missed that year's Olympic Games in Beijing and the rest of the 2008 season.

=== 2009: First world title ===
After a twelve-month lay-off due to injury, Ennis returned to competition at the World Combined Events Challenge in Desenzano del Garda in May, winning the event with a personal best score of 6,587 points, including an 800 metres personal best, also breaking Liliana Năstase's 16-year-old meeting record in the process. Ennis's foot injury meant she had to change her take-off leg in the long jump from right to left. At the UK Championships in Birmingham in July Ennis won the high jump and 100 metres hurdles.

In August, Ennis won the gold medal at the 2009 World Championships in Berlin with a personal best points total of 6,731, 238 points ahead of silver medallist Jennifer Oeser of Germany and Poland's Kamila Chudzik. She led the competition from the first event and posted a personal best of 14.14 metres in the shot put, whilst her first day points total of 4,124 points was the third-best first-day heptathlon score ever, behind world record holder Jackie Joyner-Kersee and European record holder Carolina Klüft. Ennis's World Championships points total of 6,731, 238 points was the highest heptathlon score in 2009.

Ennis was chosen as the "British Athlete of the Year" by the British Athletics Writers' Association (BAWA) and "Sportswoman of the Year" award by the Sports Journalists' Association. Ennis also came third in the 2009 BBC Sports Personality of the Year, behind Formula One world champion Jenson Button and winner Ryan Giggs of Manchester United. Sheffield City Council held a reception for Ennis in the city's Peace Gardens, at which she was presented with a Mulberry designer handbag and a canteen of Sheffield cutlery.

=== 2010: World indoor and European outdoor titles ===
In January 2010, Ennis opened her indoor season with three personal bests at Loughborough University Open meeting, then set two more personal bests at the Northern Senior Indoor Championships.

She was named team captain for the GB & NI team that won the Aviva International Match at Kelvin Hall in Glasgow. Ennis caused a surprise in winning the 60 metres hurdles in a British record time of 7.95 seconds, two hundredths of a second ahead of world indoor champion, and a rival captain (of the US), Lolo Jones.

Afterwards Jones, who hadn't lost in over two years in her event, expressed shock at being beaten by a multi-eventer, saying; "I'm looking forward to not letting heptathletes beat me when I'm only working on one thing. That's kind of crazy." At the same meeting Ennis set a new indoor personal best in the high jump of 1.94 metres.

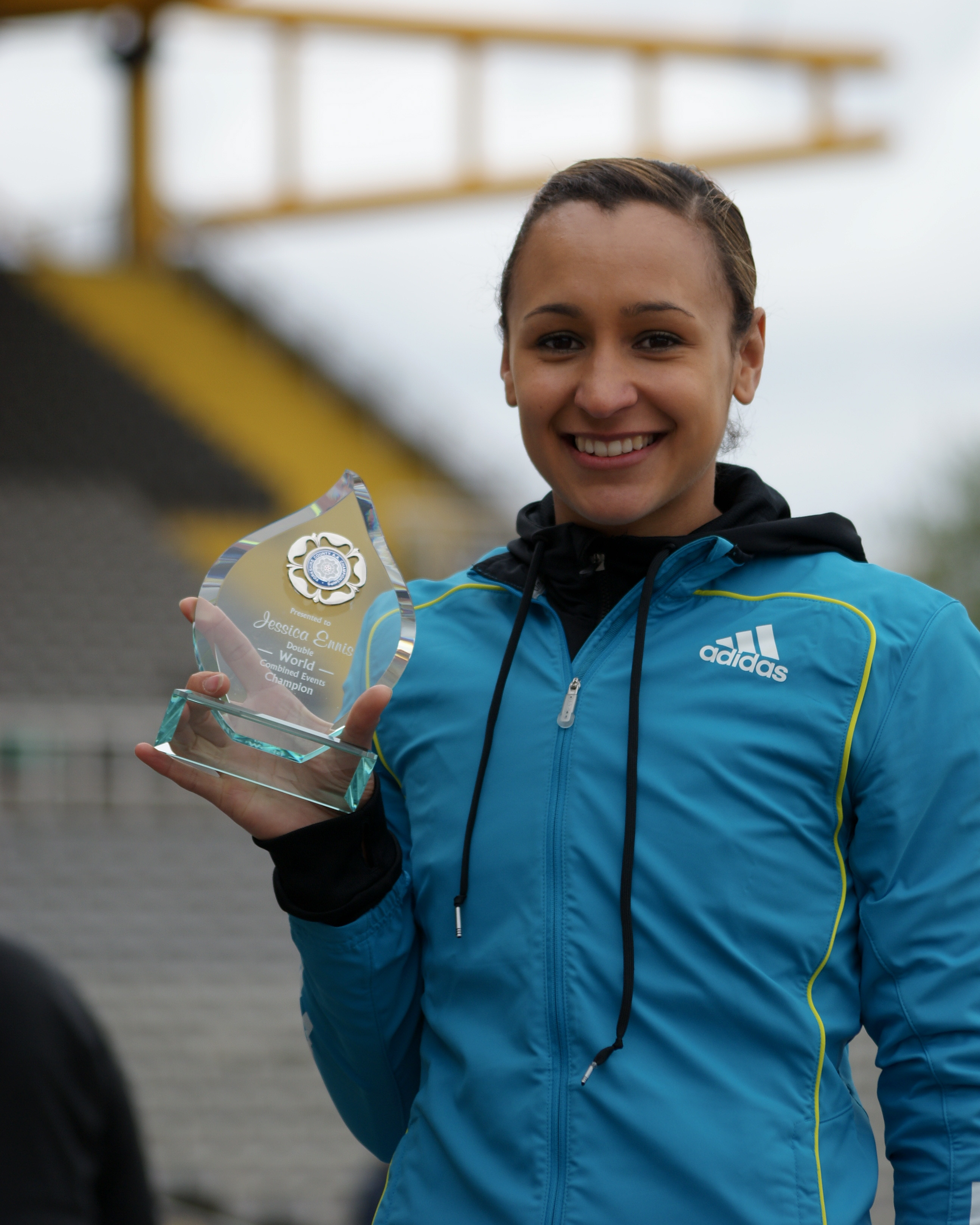
Jessica Ennis with Double World Championship Award

At the World Indoor Championships in Doha, Qatar, Ennis became the World Indoor Champion for the pentathlon with a new British, Commonwealth and Championship Record score of 4,937 points, finishing ahead of all three Beijing heptathlon medal winners, Nataliya Dobrynska, Hyleas Fountain and Tatyana Chernova. As a consequence Ennis became the first British woman to win world titles both indoors and outdoors.

In May, Ennis beat Christine Ohuruogu across the rarely contested 150 metres at the Great CityGames (0.05 short of the British record time). Later that month, Ennis returned to the 2010 Hypo-Meeting in Götzis, Austria, where she injured her ankle in 2008, winning the heptathlon with 6,689 points, with a new shot put personal best of 14.25 metres. At the Adidas Grand Prix Diamond League meeting in New York in Ennis set a personal best of 6.51 metres in the long jump.

Awarded the GB & NI captaincy again, Ennis won the heptathlon gold medal at the 2010 European Championships with a personal best and European Championship Record score of 6,823 points, eight points short of Denise Lewis's British and Commonwealth Records. Her European Championships points total of 6,823 proved to be the highest heptathlon score of 2010. She recorded a personal best in the javelin of 46.71 metres.

As in 2009, Ennis was named "British Athlete of the Year" by the BAWA and "Sportswoman of the Year" by the SJA. She was also named "Outstanding Female Athlete" at the Commonwealth Sports Awards, despite not competing in the 2010 Commonwealth Games in Delhi, won "The Best British Athletic Performance of 2010" at the UK Athletics Awards, and was awarded the Dame Marea Hartman Award, given annually to the outstanding English female athlete of the year.

Ennis was nominated for a Laureus World Sports Award for Comeback of the Year after she missed the 2008 Olympics with injury, but returned to become world champion in 2009 (lost out to Belgian tennis player Kim Clijsters), and for the World and European Athlete of the Year awards (both won by Croatian high jumper Blanka Vlasic). She was a three-time European Athlete of the Month winner.

Ennis came third for the second year in succession in the BBC Sports Personality of the Year, behind the winner, jump jockey Tony McCoy, and darts player Phil Taylor. She was also awarded a LittD Honorary Doctorate from the University of Sheffield for her contribution to sport.

Despite ending her season in early August to maximize her recovery time ahead of 2011, Ennis still finished ranked first in the world for heptathlon and indoor pentathlon, and ranked first in Britain for the 60 metres hurdles, 100 metres hurdles, high jump, and long jump.

=== 2011: Second world title ===
In her first competition of 2011 at the Northern Athletics Senior Indoor Championships at the English Institute of Sport in Sheffield in mid January Ennis set an indoor personal best of 14.11 metres in the shot put a record she improved by 50 centimetres a week later at an indoor meeting in Loughborough.

Later that month at the annual International in Glasgow, Ennis won the 60 metres hurdles in a time of 7.97 seconds, again beating Lolo Jones.

At the Indoor UK Trials and Championships in Sheffield Ennis pulled out of the high jump, and the rest of the meeting, after clearing 1.88 metres, citing "tightness" in her ankle. As a consequence she withdrew from the 2011 European Indoor Championships. The injury was diagnosed as inflammation of the plantaris muscle.

In May Ennis won the heptathlon at the Hypo-Meeting in Götzis, Austria, for the second consecutive year, recording 6,790 points, 101 more than in 2010 and 33 points below her personal best, beating Russia's Tatyana Chernova by 251 points. Ennis recorded personal best times in the 200 metres (23.11 seconds) and the 800 metres (2 minutes 8.46 seconds). It was a result that meant Ennis had extended her unbeaten record in multi-events competition to two years.

At the UK Trials and Championships at the Alexander Stadium in Birmingham Ennis competed in five events, equalling her outdoor personal best in the shot put (14.25 metres) and winning the high jump. Later at Loughborough Ennis recorded a personal best of 12.79 seconds in the 100 metres hurdles.

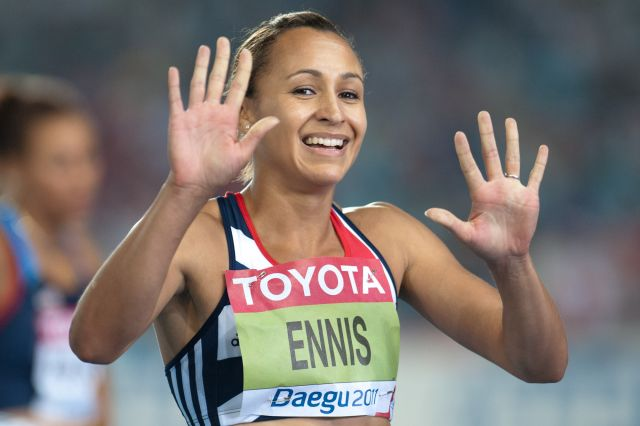
Ennis during the 2011 World Athletics Championships in Daegu

At the 2011 World Athletics Championships in Daegu, South Korea, Ennis originally finished second to Tatyana Chernova, with a score of 6,751 points, 129 points behind Chernova and 72 points below her own personal best of 6,823 points. Ennis beat Chernova in five of the seven events, but Chernova scored 251 more points in the javelin (52.95 metres, compared with Ennis's best throw of 39.95 metres). Ennis registered personal bests of 14.67 metres in the shot put and 2 minutes 7.81 seconds in the 800 metres, whilst also equalling her best of 6.51 metres in the long jump. It was Ennis's first defeat in multi-event competition in over two years, but Chernova was later disqualified for failing retrospective drug testing. In 2016, Ennis was upgraded to the gold medal by the Court of Arbitration for Sport after Chernova was stripped of her title.

Ennis was appointed Member of the Order of the British Empire (MBE) in the 2011 Birthday Honours for services to athletics.

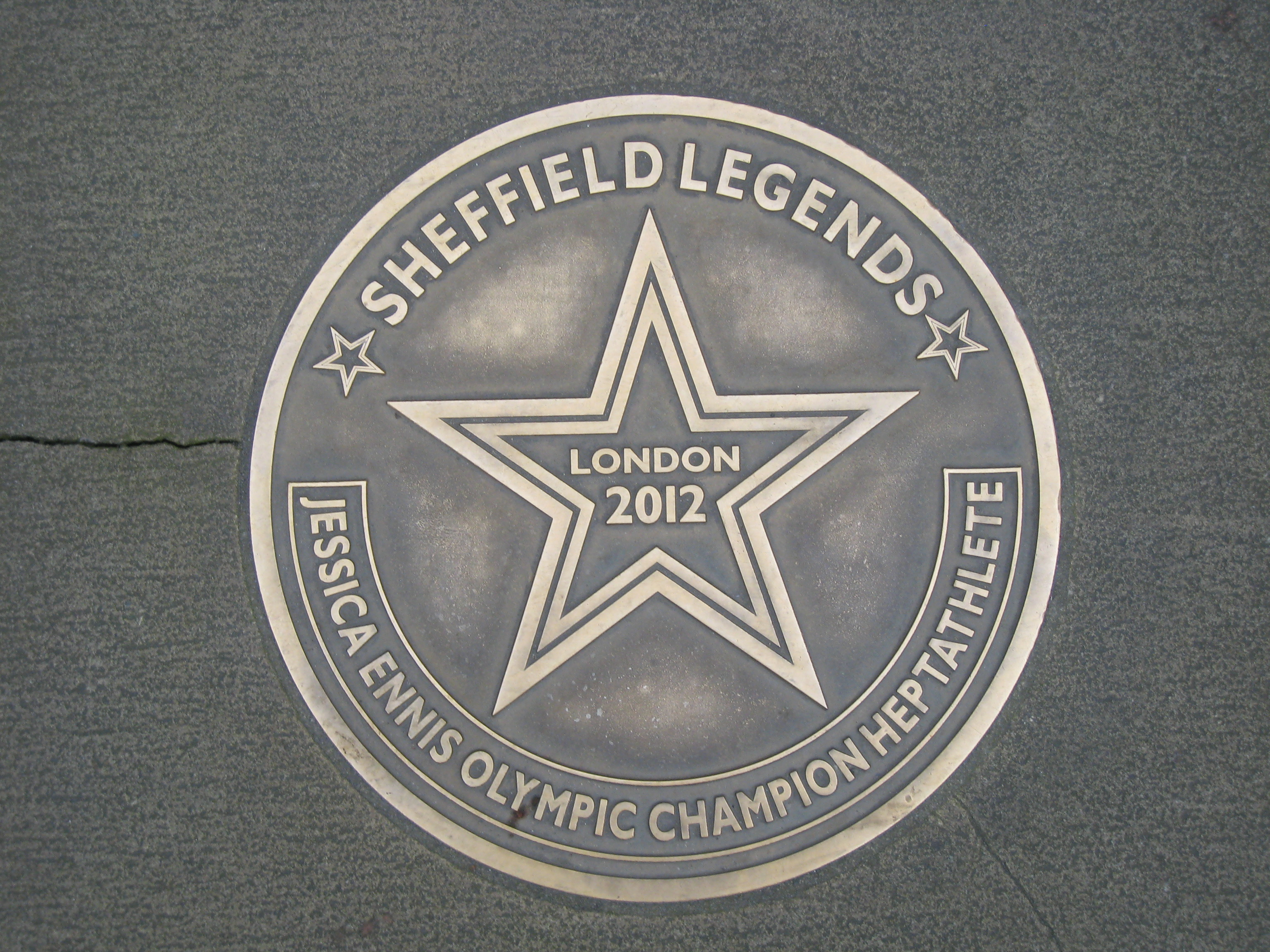
Walk of Fame

In June 2011 Ennis was inducted into the Sheffield Legends 'Walk of Fame', alongside other well-known people born in or connected with Sheffield, who are honoured by plaques set in the pavement outside the Town Hall. The following month a lifesize model of Ennis was shown at Madame Tussaud's in London. In October Ennis was voted "British Athlete of the Year" for the third consecutive year by the British Athletic Writers' Association.

=== 2012: Olympic champion ===
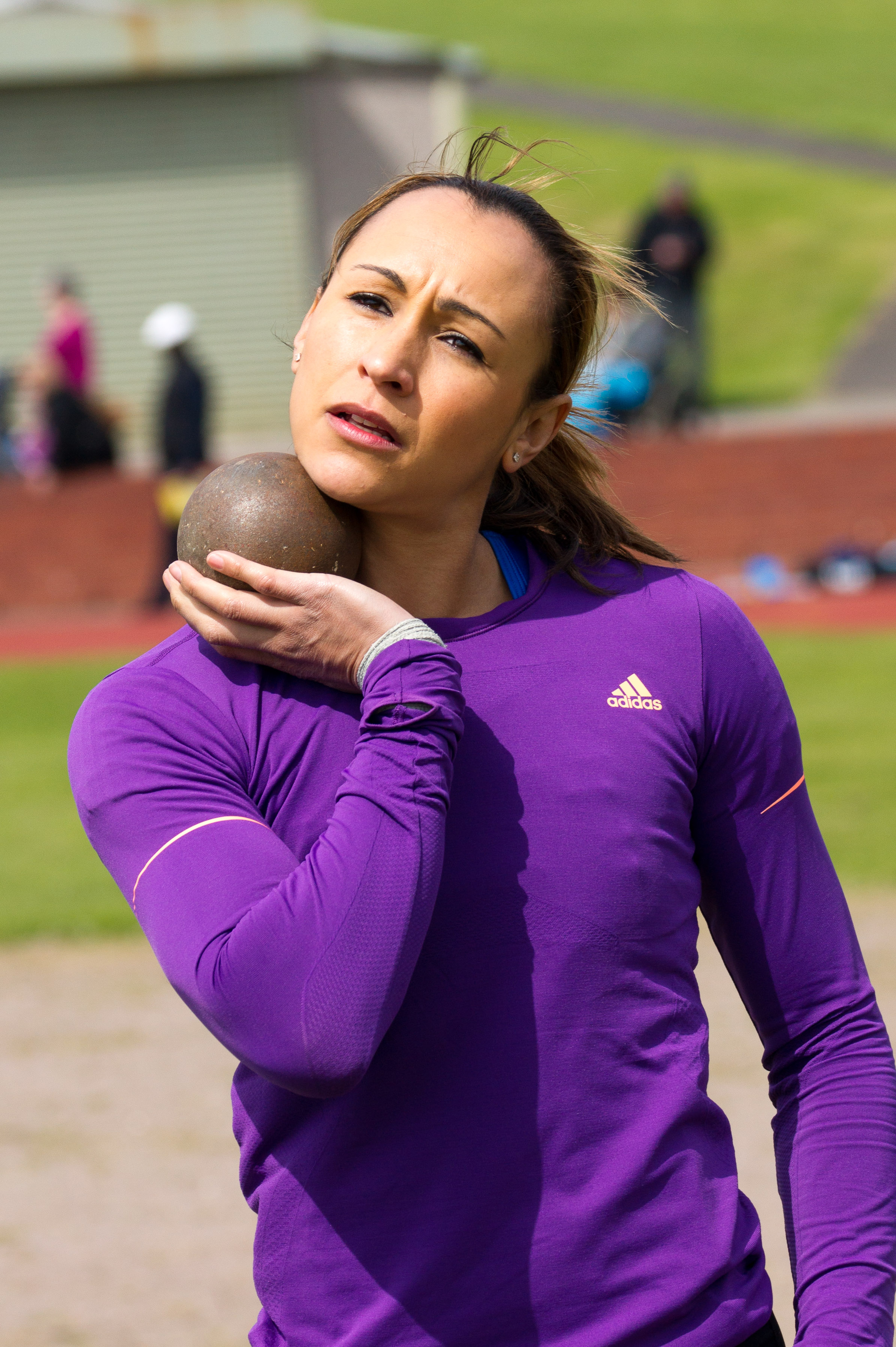
Competing at the Yorkshire Track and Field Championships 2012 at the Dorothy Hyman Sports Centre, Cudworth, South Yorkshire

At the 2012 British Indoor Athletics Championships at the English Institute of Sport in early February, Ennis won the high jump, clearing 1.91 metres, and finished sixth in the shot put, with a best throw of 14.09 metres. The following day, Ennis won the 60 metres hurdles in an equal personal best time of 7.95 seconds.

Ennis recorded two indoor personal bests at the Birmingham Indoor Grand Prix on 18 February; 7.87 seconds in the 60 metres hurdles and 6.47 metres in the long jump and finished second at the World Indoor Championships in Istanbul in March, behind Nataliya Dobrynska. In finishing second, Ennis recorded a personal best and national record of 4,965 points, also recording indoor personal bests in the shot put (14.79 metres) and 800 metres (2:08.09).

Her 4,965 points total put her third on the world's all-time list for the indoor pentathlon. Her time of 7.91 seconds would have won her the 60m hurdles silver medal.

In May, Ennis ran 12.75 seconds in the 100 metres hurdles at the Powerade Great CityGames in Manchester, beating 2008 Olympic gold medallist Dawn Harper and 2011 World Championship silver medallist Danielle Carruthers. The event was notable for there being only nine hurdles instead of the regulation ten due to an administrative error. Ennis broke Denise Lewis's British heptathlon record at the Hypo Meeting in Götzis, Austria, recording a total of 6,906 points, thus becoming the eighth woman to score over 6,900 points. Ennis's performance included personal bests in the 200 metres (22.88 seconds) and javelin (47.11 metres), whilst she equalled her personal best in the long jump (6.51 metres). Ennis beat Tatyana Chernova by 132 points.

Ennis participated in three events at the UK Trials at the Alexander Stadium, Birmingham, winning the high jump with a season's best of 1.89 metres, the 100 metres hurdles in 12.92 seconds, beating Tiffany Porter into second place, and finishing sixth in the long jump with 6.27 metres.

In August, Ennis won the gold medal in the heptathlon at the London Olympics with a British and Commonwealth record score of 6,955 points, beating silver medallist Lilli Schwarzkopf by 306 points and bronze medallist Tatyana Chernova by a further 21 points. At the end of the first day, Ennis had scored 4,158 points, her highest ever first-day total, and was 184 points ahead of her nearest competitor Austra Skujyte. Ennis' first-day score included two personal bests: 12.54 seconds in the 100 metres hurdles and 22.83 seconds in the 200 metres. Her time in the 100 metres hurdles was a new British record and also the fastest time ever run in a heptathlon. It also equalled Dawn Harper's winning time for the women's 100 metres hurdles final in the 2008 Olympics. Ennis achieved another personal best of 47.49 metres in the javelin and won the final event, the 800 metres, in a time of 2:08.65. The following day, Ennis announced she would not compete in the 100 metres hurdles individual event. Her time in the heptathlon 100 metres hurdles would have gained her fourth place in the individual final, and her time in the 200 metres would have placed her seventh in the individual event.

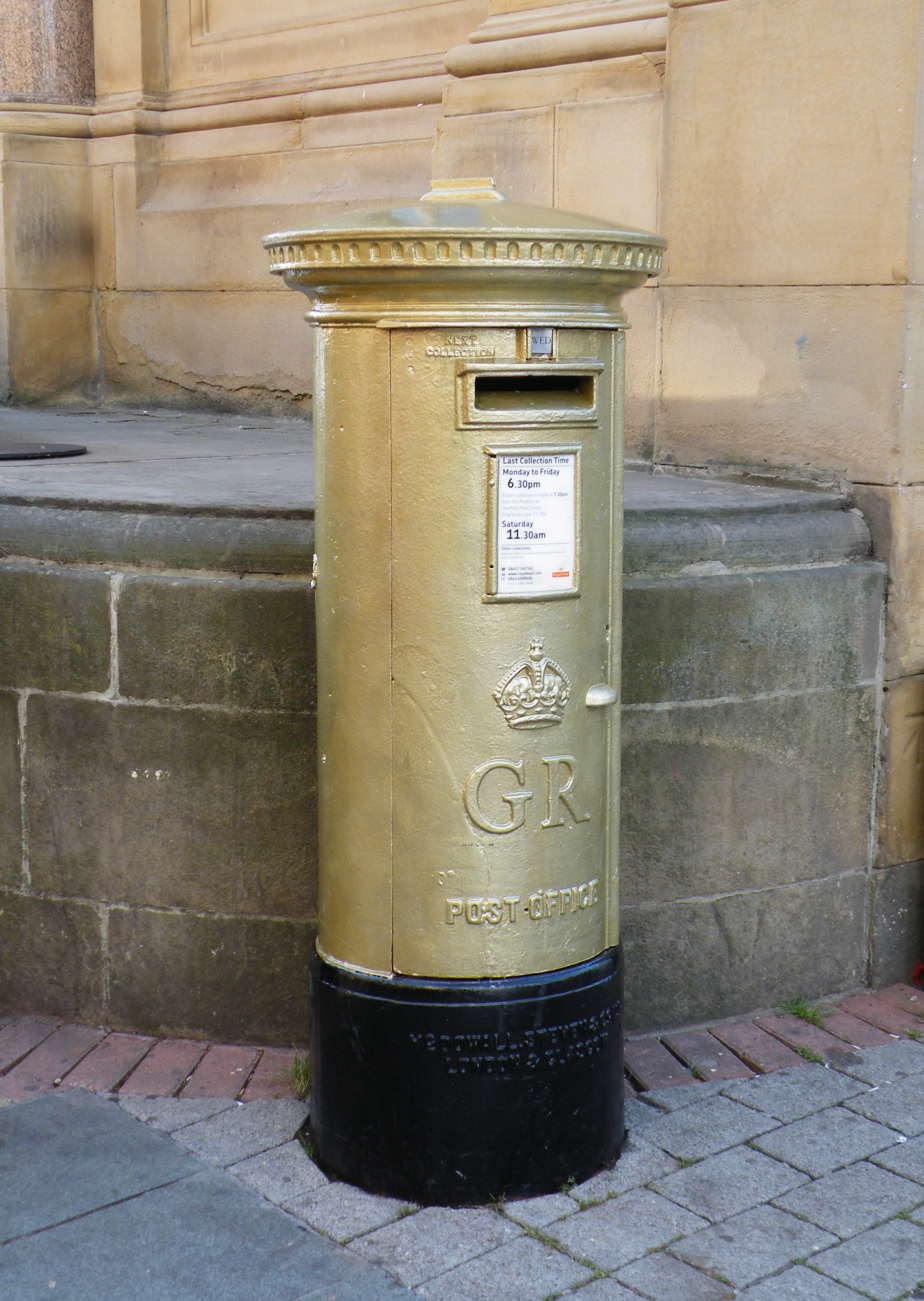
Ennis' Gold Post Box at Barker's Pool, Sheffield

Ennis, along with other British 2012 Olympic gold medal winners, was featured on a special Royal Mail commemorative postage stamp and had a post box on the corner of Division Street and Holly Street in Sheffield painted gold in her honour. The postbox was vandalised within hours but repaired immediately by Royal Mail.

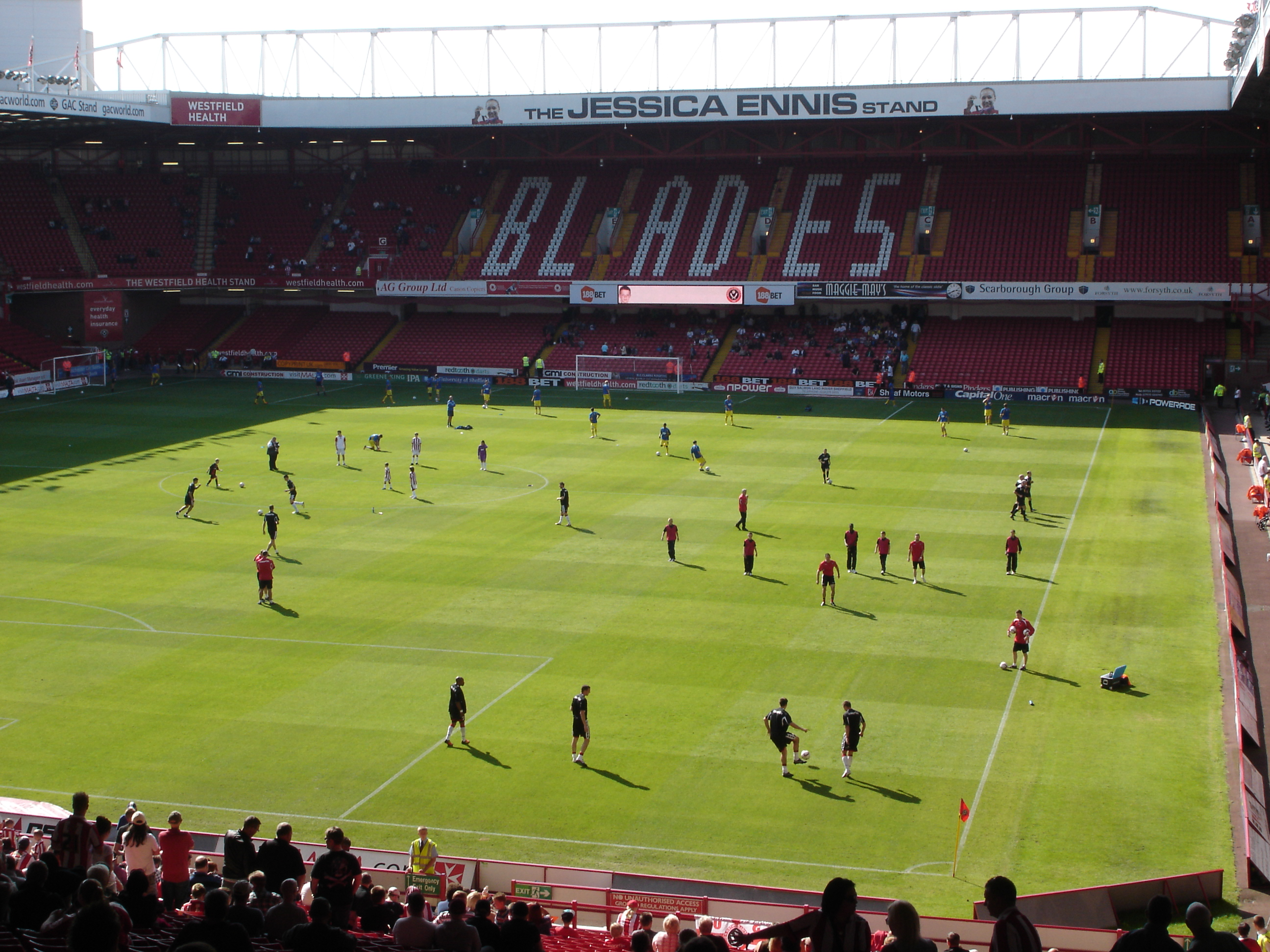
The Jessica Ennis Stand at Bramall Lane

Ennis was honoured in various ways. Sheffield artist/cartoonist Pete McKee paid tribute to her in a painting showing her driving an open-top sports car. Prints were to be sold for the benefit of the Sheffield Children's Hospital charity, of which Ennis is a patron. She was featured on the cover of a special Olympic edition of The Beano as Ennis the Menace. Sheffield United announced that the Bramall Lane stand at their Bramall Lane stadium would be renamed The Jessica Ennis Stand. Henderson's Relish produced a special limited edition bottle of the condiment with a gold label instead of the usual orange. The label also made use of the company's slogan in relation to Ennis: "Congratulations Jessica – Strong and Northern".

In early September, Sheffield City Council voted unanimously to award her the Freedom of the City of Sheffield. Ennis was honoured on a 'Wall of Fame' in Sheffield Winter Garden bearing the names of sportspeople from the city who competed in the 2012 Olympics and Paralympics.

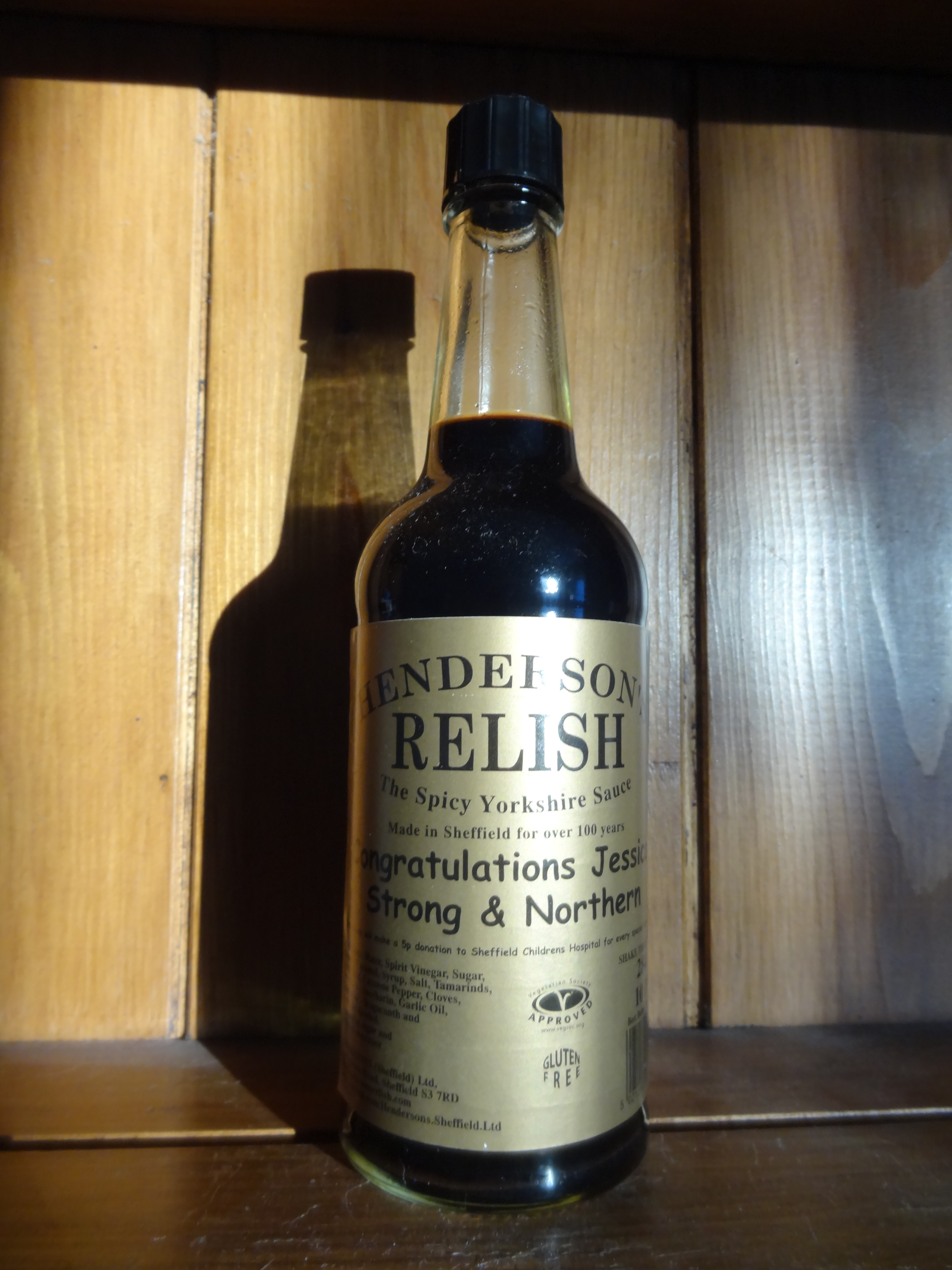
Henderson's Relish brought out to commemorate Jessica Ennis's Olympic Games gold medal

In mid August, Ennis was welcomed back to Sheffield by an estimated twenty thousand people in Barker's Pool in the city centre. Afterwards a civic reception was held at the City Hall.

After winning "European Athlete of the Month" for May, Ennis was selected as EAA "European Female Athlete of the Year" in October. Sebastian Coe collected the award on Ennis's behalf as she was unable to attend the ceremony in Malta due to training commitments. In October, she was also voted "British Olympic Athlete of the Year" in a public poll run by UK Athletics. Ennis obtained 48 per cent of the vote, narrowly beating Mo Farah. In the same month, Ennis won "British Athlete of the Year" from the British Athletics Writers' Association for a fourth successive year, "Ultimate Olympian" at Cosmopolitan's Ultimate Woman of the Year Awards 2012, and also received nominations for IAAF "Female Athlete of the Year" and Sports Journalists' Association "Sportswoman of the Year". She then made the final shortlist of three for IAAF "Female Athlete of the Year", alongside Allyson Felix and Valerie Adams. The award went to Felix.

In November, Ennis was named the Sunday Times "Sportswoman of the Year", and along with Victoria Pendleton and Ellie Simmonds won "British Ambassadors of the Year" at Harper's Bazaar's Women of the Year Awards 2012. The same month, Ennis was nominated for William Hill "Sportswoman of the Year". Also in November, Ennis's long-time coach Toni Minichiello was named "Coach of the Year" by Sports Coach UK, a body that supports sports training across the country. In December, she was voted "Sportswoman of the Year" by the Sports Journalists' Association.

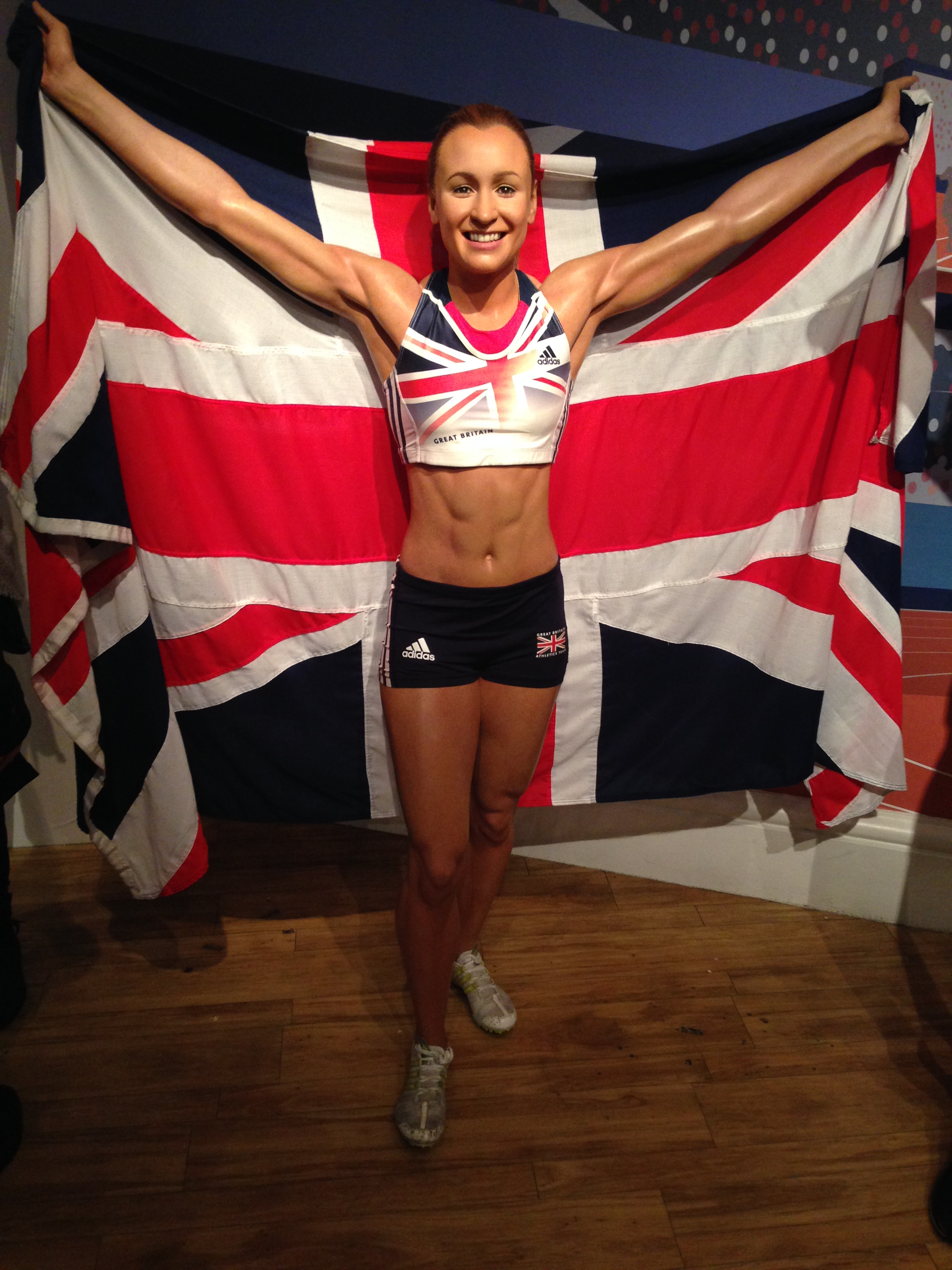
Wax statue of Ennis-Hill at Madame Tussauds, London

Ennis was voted into the top three for the BBC Sports Personality of the Year for the third time, as runner-up to Bradley Wiggins. Ennis was appointed Commander of the Order of the British Empire (CBE) in the 2013 New Year Honours for services to athletics. Ennis was named as the World Sportswoman of the year at the Laureus World Sport Awards.

Ennis's autobiography, Unbelievable – From My Childhood Dreams to Winning Olympic Gold, was published on 8 November by Hodder and Stoughton, and the same day she was guest of honour at the Christmas lights switch-on at a charity event at Meadowhall Shopping Centre, which raised over £8,000 for her nominated charity, the Sheffield Children's Hospital Make It Better appeal. In the book, Ennis wrote that in 2010 UK Athletics head coach Charles Van Commenee put pressure on her and Toni Minichiello to move their training base to London, but both "believed in what we were doing in Sheffield and ... stayed strong".

In early November, Minichiello announced that Ennis would compete in the heptathlon at the 2014 Commonwealth Games in Glasgow, a competition Ennis has not previously won, having taken the bronze medal in 2006 and not entering in 2010. The same month, Ennis reiterated her desire to switch to the 100 metres hurdles in the long term, but added that it would not be before the 2013 World Championships in Athletics in Moscow, where she would attempt to regain the heptathlon world title.

Ennis finished the year with the world leading points total for the heptathlon, and the Commonwealth's leading points total for the pentathlon. She also recorded the fastest European times for the 60 metres hurdles and the 100 metres hurdles, and the leading height in Britain for the high jump.

=== 2013–14: Injury struggles and pregnancy layoff ===
The year began with uncertainty over the future of Ennis's coach Toni Minichiello and her primary training facility, the Don Valley Stadium in Sheffield. Minichiello's contract as the UK Athletics national coach for combined events expired at the end of 2012 and was not renewed as he was not prepared to move to Loughborough as part of the organisation's high-performance programme, whilst Sheffield City Council considered closing the Don Valley Stadium due to budget cuts. On 1 March, Sheffield Council voted to close the stadium.

Ennis did not compete in the 2013 indoor season, with her main focus of the year being the outdoor World Championships in Moscow. At a ceremony at Sheffield Town Hall at the end of March, Ennis received a scroll from John Campbell, the Lord Mayor of Sheffield, recognising her award of the Freedom of the City.

Ennis made her season debut at an invitation meeting at Leeds Metropolitan University on 20 April. She won the javelin competition with a best throw of 44.56 metres. An ankle injury prevented her from competing in June, and she pulled out of meetings in Edinburgh, Oslo and Tallinn. She also missed the British Championships in mid July.

Ennis-Hill returned to action in a meeting at Loughborough where she recorded a javelin personal best of 48.33 metres. She also competed in the long jump, reverting to the right-foot take off she used before her 2008 injury. Afterwards she still complained of pain in her ankle. At the London Anniversary Games she finished fourth in the 100 metres hurdles in 13.08 seconds and eighth in the long jump, recording 6.16 metres but four days later decided not to compete at the World Championships as she had not fully recovered from injury.

Ennis-Hill's pregnancy caused her to miss the 2014 season, but she was still voted 'the most inspirational figure by under-25-year olds in the UK' in a poll conducted by the organisation UK Youth for its Starbucks Youth Action programme. She returned to full-time training in October.

=== 2015: Comeback and third world title ===
Ennis-Hill made her comeback in the Great City Games in Manchester in May, finishing third in the 100 metres hurdles. She then finished fourth in her first heptathlon since the London Olympics at the Hypo-Meeting in Götzis, Austria, comfortably achieving the qualifying standard for the 2016 Rio de Janeiro Olympic Games. The competition was won by Canada's Brianne Theisen-Eaton. After competing in three events at the Anniversary Games at the London Olympic Stadium, Ennis-Hill declared herself fit for the 2015 World Athletics Championships in Beijing, where she won the heptathlon with a total of 6,669 points. After building a large lead over the first six events, she won her heat in the 800 m to place 115 points ahead of Theisen-Eaton.

In July it was announced that a re-test of a blood sample given in 2009 by Tatyana Chernova showed the presence of a prohibited anabolic steroid. The Russian Anti-Doping Agency annulled two years' worth of Chernova's results, but the period of annulment ended 16 days before the 2011 Daegu World Championships, where she won the gold medal. Silver medallist Ennis-Hill appealed to the IAAF that Chernova's results annulment should extend to that competition. In turn the IAAF similarly appealed to the Court of Arbitration for Sport. Ennis-Hill was retrospectively awarded the gold in 2013.

In September Ennis-Hill was nominated for the European Athlete of the Year award, which was won by Dutch sprinter Dafne Schippers. In November Ennis-Hill won the Sunday Times and Sky Sports Sportswoman of the Year award for a second time, was voted BAWA Athlete of the Year for a record equalling fifth time (tied with Paula Radcliffe), and was nominated for IAAF Athlete of the Year. In December Ennis-Hill was selected as Sports Journalists' Association Sportswoman of the Year for a joint-record fourth time (again tied with Radcliffe), and was voted the best British and International Female Athlete in 2015 by the Athletics Weekly readers. She also finished third in the 2015 BBC Sports Personality of the Year, behind Rugby League player Kevin Sinfield and winner Andy Murray. It was the fourth time she had been voted in the top three of the award.

=== 2016: Olympic silver and retirement ===
An achilles tendon injury kept Ennis-Hill out of the 2016 indoor season. She returned to action at the end of May but did not compete in the Hypo-Meeting in Götzis, Austria. She chose to miss the pre-Olympics Team GB holding camp in Belo Horizonte because of fears about the Zika virus but stated that she would compete at the Rio Olympics, Ennis-Hill won her first heptathlon of the season at the Combined Events Challenge in Ratingen, Germany, with 6,733 points, the second-best score of the year. She also recorded a personal best of 6.63 metres in the long jump.

In August, Ennis-Hill was defending her Olympic title in the heptathlon at the 2016 Olympic Games, but was beaten into the silver medal position by Nafissatou Thiam of Belgium, who recorded five personal bests in the seven events.

Ennis-Hill was voted as Great Britain's favourite sporting hero in a poll conducted by Sport Relief in January. She was included on the list for the entertainment section of Forbes Magazine's "30 under 30" list for Europe in January. In February, Ennis-Hill was voted Sportswoman of the Year at the British Ethnic Diversity Sports Awards. She was nominated for a Laureus World Sports Award for Comeback of the Year for a second time in March. On 13 October 2016, Ennis-Hill announced her retirement from athletics.

== Post-retirement ==
On 29 November 2016, the Court of Arbitration for Sport ruled that Tatyana Chernova was to be stripped of her gold medal from the 2011 World Championships for a doping violation as a result of anomalies in her biological passport. As a result, Ennis-Hill was promoted to receive the gold medal, retrospectively winning her third World title, and equalling the record for World Championship titles won by Carolina Klüft, and the five global multi-event titles achieved by Klüft and by Jackie Joyner-Kersee.

Ennis-Hill was appointed Dame Commander of the Order of the British Empire (DBE) in the 2017 New Year Honours for services to athletics.

Ahead of the 2017 World Athletics Championships in London, Ennis-Hill filmed a special programme for the BBC, entitled 'Jessica Ennis-Hill and the Next Generation', in which she met some of the rising stars of British athletics. Later that year, Ennis-Hill became the second woman (and the first British woman) to win the BBC Sports Personality of the Year Lifetime Achievement Award.

=== Philanthropy and entrepreneurially ===
In 2016, Ennis signed a book deal with Hodder Children’s Books, an imprint of the Hachette Children’s Group. She co-wrote the seven-book series called Evie's Magic Bracelet with children’s author Elen Caldecott. The first book in the series, The Silver Unicorn, was released in March 2017.

In 2019, Ennis-Hill launched Jennis, an app-based training programme. In 2021, she added a new product called CycleMapping, which helps women map their training to their menstrual cycle. With her new product, she ventured into a new joint-partnership with the Ladies European Tour (LET) in 2023. In 2023, the St. George's Society of New York awarded her their Anglo-American Cultural Award.

=== Media and television work ===
Ennis has been a regular guest analyst for BBC's athletics coverage, including the Olympic Games in 2020 and 2024, World Championships in 2019, 2022 and 2023, and the Commonwealth Games in 2018 and 2022.

== Personal life ==
Ennis-Hill lives in Sheffield. She married Andy Hill, a construction site manager, in Derbyshire in May 2013, and said she would be known as Jessica Ennis-Hill.

On 10 January 2014, she announced she would be unable to compete in the 2014 Commonwealth Games because she was pregnant with her first child. She gave birth to her son Reggie in July 2014. On 16 March 2017, Ennis-Hill announced she was pregnant for a second time. She gave birth to her daughter Olivia on 23 September 2017.

She is a fan of Sheffield United, which named one stand of the Bramall Lane stadium in her honour in 2012. In November 2014, she stated that she would want her name removed from the stand if the club was to re-sign the convicted rapist and former player, Ched Evans. As a result, Ennis-Hill received rape threats via Twitter. South Yorkshire Police said on 14 November that they were investigating the tweets. In October 2016 the charges against Evans were dropped, he was found not guilty of the offence and he restarted his playing career. The club renamed the stand after a sponsor in 2015.

Ennis-Hill is an ambassador for the Jaguar Academy of Sport and a patron of both the Sheffield Children's Hospital charity and Barrie Wells' sports foundation. She is a columnist for The Times newspaper and advertises Aviva, Powerade, BP, Adidas, Omega watches, Olay Essentials and Santander UK.

On 18 July 2021, Ennis-Hill guested on the broadcast of BBC Radio 4's Desert Island Discs. Her book choice was The Wonders of Life by Brian Cox. Her luxury item was her family photo album, and her Castaway's favourite disc—Unfinished Sympathy by Massive Attack.

== Achievements ==
All information from World Athletics profile unless otherwise noted.

=== International competitions ===
Year	Competition	Venue	Position	Event	Result
2003	World Youth Championships	Sherbrooke, Canada	5th	Heptathlon	5311 pts
2004	World Junior Championships	Grosseto, Italy	8th	Heptathlon	5542 pts
2004	Commonwealth Youth Games	Bendigo, Australia	2nd	100 m hurdles	14.50
2004	Commonwealth Youth Games	Bendigo, Australia	2nd	High jump	1.75 m
2005	European Junior Championships	Kaunas, Lithuania	1st	Heptathlon	5891 pts
2005	Universiade	İzmir, Turkey	3rd	Heptathlon	5910 pts
2006	European Championships	Gothenburg, Sweden	8th	Heptathlon	6287 pts
2006	European Cup Combined Events	Arles, France	4th	Heptathlon	6170 pts
2006	European Cup Combined Events	Arles, France	4th	Team	17,454 pts
2006	Commonwealth Games	Melbourne, Australia	3rd	Heptathlon	6269 pts
2007	European Indoor Championships	Birmingham, United Kingdom	6th	Pentathlon	4716 pts
2007	European Cup Combined Events	Szczecin, Poland	1st	Heptathlon	6399 pts
2007	European Cup Combined Events	Szczecin, Poland	1st	Team	18,329 pts
2007	European U23 Championships	Debrecen, Hungary	3rd	100 m hurdles	13.09
2007	World Championships	Osaka, Japan	4th	Heptathlon	6469 pts
2009	World Championships	Berlin, Germany	1st	Heptathlon	6731 pts
2010	World Indoor Championships	Doha, Qatar	1st	Pentathlon	4937 pts
2010	European Championships	Barcelona, Spain	1st	Heptathlon	6823 pts
2011	World Championships	Daegu, South Korea	1st	Heptathlon	6751 pts
2012	World Indoor Championships	Istanbul, Turkey	2nd	Pentathlon	4965 pts
2012	Olympic Games	London, United Kingdom	1st	Heptathlon	6955 pts
2015	World Championships	Beijing, China	1st	Heptathlon	6669 pts
2016	Olympic Games	Rio de Janeiro, Brazil	2nd	Heptathlon	6775 pts

=== Circuit wins ===
IAAF Combined Events Challenge

- Multistars: 2007, 2009 (MR)
- Hypo-Meeting: 2010, 2011, 2012
- Mehrkampf-Meeting Ratingen: 2016

European Athletics Promotion

- Loughborough Open
  - 100 m hurdles: 2011 (MR)
  - Long jump: 2009 (MR), 2012, 2013

=== National championships ===
Year	Competition	Venue	Position	Event	Result
2005	AAA Indoor Championships	English Institute of Sport	3rd	Pentathlon	4089 pts
2005	AAA Championships	Manchester Regional Arena	3rd	100 m hurdles	13.26
2005	AAA Championships	Manchester Regional Arena	6th	High jump	1.80 m
2006	AAA Indoor Championships	English Institute of Sport	4th	60 m hurdles	8.32
2006	AAA Indoor Championships	English Institute of Sport	6th	Long jump	6.21 m
2006	AAA Championships	Manchester Regional Arena	4th	100 m hurdles	13.33
2006	AAA Championships	Manchester Regional Arena	3rd	High jump	1.82 m
2007	British Indoor Championships	English Institute of Sport	3rd	60 m hurdles	8.18
2007	British Indoor Championships	English Institute of Sport	3rd	Long jump	6.15 m
2007	British Indoor Championships	English Institute of Sport	11th	Shot put	12.38 m
2007	British Championships	Manchester Regional Arena	1st	100 m hurdles	13.25
2007	British Championships	Manchester Regional Arena	1st	High jump	1.87 m
2008	British Indoor Championships	English Institute of Sport	3rd	60 m hurdles	8.20
2008	British Indoor Championships	English Institute of Sport	1st	High jump	1.92 m
2009	British Championships	Alexander Stadium	1st	100 m hurdles	12.87
2009	British Championships	Alexander Stadium	1st	High jump	1.91 m
2011	British Indoor Championships	English Institute of Sport	1st	High jump	1.88 m
2011	British Indoor Championships	English Institute of Sport	7th	Shot put	13.86 m
2011	British Championships	Alexander Stadium	2nd	100 m hurdles	12.96
2011	British Championships	Alexander Stadium	1st	High jump	1.89 m
2011	British Championships	Alexander Stadium	3rd	Long jump	6.44 m
2011	British Championships	Alexander Stadium	7th	Shot put	14.25 m
2011	British Championships	Alexander Stadium	10th	Javelin throw	42.93 m
2012	British Indoor Championships	English Institute of Sport	1st	60 m hurdles	7.95
2012	British Indoor Championships	English Institute of Sport	1st	High jump	1.91 m
2012	British Indoor Championships	English Institute of Sport	6th	Shot put	14.09 m
2012	British Championships	Alexander Stadium	1st	100 m hurdles	12.92
2012	British Championships	Alexander Stadium	1st	High jump	1.89 m
2012	British Championships	Alexander Stadium	6th	Long jump	6.27 m
2015	British Championships	Alexander Stadium	3rd	100 m hurdles	13.10
2015	British Championships	Alexander Stadium	12th	Javelin	39.84 m

=== Detailed results ===
Competition	100 m hurdles	High jump	Shot put	200 metres	Long jump	Javelin	800 metres	Heptathlon total
2003 World Youth Championships	13.86 sec	1.75 m	10.13 m	23.73 sec	5.47 m	25.52 m	2:18.21	5311 pts
2004 World Junior Championships	13.57 sec	1.80 m	10.52 m	24.23 sec	5.59 m	28.04 m	2:19.16	5542 pts
2005 European Junior Championships	13.46 sec	1.79 m	11.40 m	24.29 sec	6.19 m	32.55 m	2:17.23	5891 pts
2005 Summer Universiade	13.56 sec	1.87 m	12.26 m	24.43 sec	6.22 m	28.94 m	2:21.08	5910 pts
2006 Commonwealth Games	13.32 sec	1.91 m	11.87 m	23.80 sec	6.15 m	36.39 m	2:12.66	6269 pts
2006 European Championships	13.33 sec	1.86 m	12.72 m	23.56 sec	6.19 m	36.65 m	2:13.45	6287 pts
2007 World Championships	12.97 sec	1.89 m	11.93 m	23.15 sec	6.33 m	38.07 m	2:11.39	6469 pts
2009 World Championships	12.93 sec	1.92 m	14.14 m	23.25 sec	6.29 m	43.54 m	2:12.22	6731 pts
2010 European Championships	12.95 sec	1.89 m	14.05 m	23.21 sec	6.43 m	46.71 m	2:10.18	6823 pts
2011 World Championships	12.94 sec	1.86 m	14.67 m	23.27 sec	6.51 m	39.95 m	2:07.81	6751 pts
2012 Olympic Games	12.54 sec	1.86 m	14.28 m	22.83 sec	6.48 m	47.49 m	2:08.65	6955 pts
2015 World Championships	12.91 sec	1.86 m	13.73 m	23.42 sec	6.43 m	42.51 m	2:10.13	6669 pts
2016 Olympic Games	12.84 sec	1.89 m	13.86 m	23.49 sec	6.34 m	46.06 m	2:09.07	6775 pts

Competition	60 m hurdles	High jump	Shot put	Long jump	800 metres	Pentathlon total
2007 European Indoor Championships	8.22 sec	1.91 m	13.28 m	6.19 m	2:17.03	4716 pts
2010 World Indoor Championships	8.04 sec	1.90 m	14.01 m	6.44 m	2:12.55	4937 pts
2012 World Indoor Championships	7.91 sec	1.87 m	14.79 m	6.19 m	2:08.09	4965 pts

=== Personal bests ===
By clearing 1.95 metres in the high jump, Ennis achieved a foot (30 cm) above her own height of 1.65 metres which only ten women have ever managed. It also set a joint British outdoor record at the time shared with Diana Davies, Susan Moncrieff and Debbie Marti until it was broken in August 2014 by Isobel Pooley at 1.96m (now held by Katarina Johnson-Thompson at 1.98m)

Her personal best of 12.54 seconds in the 100 metres hurdles is the world best time in the heptathlon and matches the winning time for the women's 100 metres hurdles as an individual event at the 2008 Beijing Olympics. At the time it set a new British record in the individual event.

Ennis was the British record holder for the heptathlon until 2019 with a score of 6,955 points, breaking Olympic gold-medallist Denise Lewis's previous record of 6,831 points. Were Ennis to equal all of her personal bests in a single heptathlon competition, she would achieve a total of 7,175 points; Lewis's equivalent personal best total would be 7,039 points.

Outdoor personal bests

Event	Record	Points	Venue	Date	Notes
100 metres hurdles	12.54 secs	1,195	London, England	3 August 2012	2012 Summer Olympics. World heptathlon record. British record until broken by Tiffany Porter in September 2014.
High jump	1.95 m	1,171	Desenzano del Garda, Italy	5 May 2007	Joint British record at the time (see above)
Shot put	14.67 m	839	Daegu, South Korea	29 August 2011	
200 metres	22.83 secs	1,096	London, England	3 August 2012	
Long jump	6.63 m	1,049	Ratingen, Germany	26 June 2016	
Javelin	48.33 m	828	Loughborough, England	23 July 2013	
800 metres	2:07.81	997	Daegu, South Korea	30 August 2011	
Heptathlon	6,955 pts	7,175 (potential)	London, England	4 August 2012	2012 Summer Olympics. British and Commonwealth record until broken by Katarina Johnson-Thompson in October 2019

Indoor Personal Bests

Event	Record	Venue	Date	Notes
60 metres	7.36 secs	Sheffield, England	16 January 2010	
60 metres hurdles	7.87 secs	Birmingham, England	18 February 2012	
High jump	1.94 m	Glasgow, Scotland	30 January 2010	Joint 2nd highest ever by a British high jumper indoors at the time
Shot put	14.79 m	Istanbul, Turkey	9 March 2012	
Long Jump	6.47 m	Birmingham, England	18 February 2012	
800 metres	2:08.09	Istanbul, Turkey	9 March 2012	
Pentathlon	4,965 pts	Istanbul, Turkey	9 March 2012	British and Commonwealth record until broken by Katarina Johnson-Thompson in March 2015

Progression of best heptathlon score

Date	Competition	Venue	Points
15 July 2001	AAA Junior Championships	Bedford, England	4,711
5 August 2001	v France, Germany, Italy, Switzerland	Bedford, England	4,801
23 June 2002	AAA Junior Championships	Wrexham, Wales	4,837
4 August 2002	v Switzerland, France, Germany	Pratteln, Switzerland	5,194
13 July 2003	World Youth Championships	Quebec, Canada	5,311
9 May 2004	Multistars Meeting	Desenzano, Italy	5,364
17 July 2004	World Junior Championships	Grosseto, Italy	5,542
5 May 2005	Multistars Meeting	Salò, Italy	5,827
24 July 2005	European Junior Championships	Kaunas, Lithuania	5,891
16 August 2005	Summer Universiade	İzmir, Turkey	5,910
22 March 2006	Commonwealth Games	Melbourne, Australia	6,269
8 August 2006	European Championships	Gothenburg, Sweden	6,287
6 May 2007	Multistars Meeting	Desenzano, Italy	6,388
8 July 2007	European Cup Combined Events	Szczecin, Poland	6,399
26 August 2007	World Championships	Osaka, Japan	6,469
10 May 2009	Multistars Meeting	Desenzano, Italy	6,587
16 August 2009	World Championships	Berlin, Germany	6,731
31 July 2010	European Championships	Barcelona, Spain	6,823
27 May 2012	Hypo Meeting	Götzis, Austria	6,906
4 August 2012	Olympic Games	London, England	6,955

== See also ==
- List of awards and nominations received by Jessica Ennis-Hill
- High Jump Differentials – Women
- 2012 Summer Olympics and Paralympics gold post boxes
