= BT Sport Action Woman Awards =

The BT Sport Action Woman Awards are a series of monthly and yearly awards presented by BT Sport to the sports-woman or female sports team, usually British, who has been adjudged to have been the best of that month or year. The public vote for the winner from a list of nominations picked by BT Sport.

== Action Woman of the Year ==
BT Sport Action Woman of the Year
- Country: United Kingdom
- Presented by: BT Sport
- First award: 2013

The BT Sport Action Woman of the Year Award is decided based on a public vote, which features a list of ten nominations picked by BT Sport. Every nominee is backed by their own ambassador, whether it be from the world of sport or entertainment. The first winner of the award in 2013 was announced and presented with the award on The Clare Balding Show in January 2014. The 2014 award winner was announced and presented with it at the first BT Sport Action Woman of the Year Awards ceremony held at the BT Sport studios in December 2014. The same will happen in 2015.

=== 2013 ===
Year	Winner	Runner-up	Third place	Other Nominations	Ref
2013	Rachel Atherton (Downhill mountain biking)	Natasha Dowie (Association football)	Non Stanford (Triathlon)	Ellie Simmonds (Swimming); Heather Knight (Cricket); Sophie Christiansen (Equestrian); Charley Hull (Golf); Katie Summerhayes (Skiing); Christine Ohuruogu (Track and field); Laura Robson (Tennis)	

=== 2014 ===
Year	Winner	Runner-up	Third place	Other Nominations	Ref
2014	Charlotte Dujardin (Equestrian)	Shauna Coxsey (Rock climbing)	Jo Pavey (Track and field)	Charlotte Edwards (Cricket); Jordanne Whiley (Tennis); Fara Williams (Association football); Emily Scarratt (Rugby union); Helen Glover and Heather Stanning (Rowing); Claudia Fragapane (Artistic gymnastics); Lizzy Yarnold (Skeleton)	

=== 2015 ===
Year	Winner	Runner-up	Third place	Other Nominations	Ref
2015	England national team (Association football)	England national team (Field hockey)	Rachel Atherton (Downhill mountain biking)	Jessica Ennis-Hill (Track and field); England national team (Association football); Nicola Adams (Amateur boxing); Oxford Boat Race crew (Rowing); Rachel Atherton (Downhill mountain biking); Sarah Outen (Adventure); England national team (Field hockey); Georgina Hermitage (Track and field); Johanna Konta (Tennis); Lizzie Armistead (Road cycling)	

=== 2016 ===
Year	Winner	Runner-up	Third place	Other Nominations	Ref
2016	Rachel Atherton (Downhill mountain biking)	Charlotte Dujardin (Dressage rider)	Maddie Hinch (Field hockey)	Sarah Storey (Road and track cycling); Kadeena Cox (Track and field & track cycling); Laura Kenny (Track cycling); Nicola Adams (Boxing); Jade Jones (Taekwondo); Hannah Cockroft (Track and field); Jo Konta (Tennis)	

=== 2017 ===
Year	Winner	Runner-up	Third place	Other Nominations	Ref
2017	Jodie Taylor (Association football)	Mallory Franklin (Canoeing)	Jo Konta (Tennis)	Hannah Cockroft (Track and field); Tammy Beaumont (Cricket); Elise Christie (Short-track speed skating); Anya Shrubsole (Cricket); Katy McLean (Rugby union)	

=== 2018 ===
Year	Winner	Runner-up	Third place	Other Nominations	Ref
2018	Dina Asher Smith (Track and field)			Lizzy Yarnold (Skeleton); Fran Kirby (Football); Lucy Bronze (Football); Georgia Hall (Golf); Vicky Holland (Triathlon); Laura Kenny (Track cycling); Menna Fitzpatrick (Alpine skiing); Jen Kehoe (Alpine skiing)	

== Action Woman of the Month ==
BT Sport Action Woman of the Month
- Country: United Kingdom
- Presented by: BT Sport
- First award: 2014

The BT Sport Action Woman of the Month Award is decided based on a public vote, which features a list of usually five nominations picked by BT Sport. Each winner is announced and presented with their award on The Clare Balding Show.

=== 2014 ===
Month	Winner	Other Nominations	Ref
January			
February		Lizzy Yarnold (Skeleton); Eve Muirhead (Curling); Jenny Jones (Snowboarding); Susie Wolff (Formula one); Joanna Rowsell (Track cycling)	
March		Kelly Gallagher (Alpine skiing); Charlotte Evans (Skiing); Laura Massaro (Squash); Katarina Johnson-Thompson (Track and field); Charley Hull (Golf); Quevega (National hunt racing)	
April		Zoe Smith (Weightlifting); Charlotte Evans (Skiing); Jazz Carlin (Swimming); Charlotte Dujardin (Equestrian); Lizzie Armitstead (Road cycling)	
May		Heather Watson (Tennis); Shauna Coxsey (Rock climbing); Becky Downie (Artistic gymnastics); Morgan Lake (Track and field); Helena Costa (Association football)	
June		Helen Glover and Heather Stanning (Rowing); Jo Harten (Netball); Dina Asher-Smith (Track and field); Katie Ormerod (Snowboarding); The Elena Baltacha Foundation	
July		Libby Clegg (Track and field); Claudia Fragapane (Artistic gymnastics); Shona Richards (Track and field); Jordanne Whiley (Tennis); Kat Copeland and Imogen Walsh (Rowing)	
August		Emily Scarratt (Rugby union); Eniola Aluko (Association football); Jo Pavey (Track and field); Zara Phillips (Equestrian); Great Britain 4 × 100 m relay team (Track and field)	
September		Joanne Eccles (Equestrian); Samantha Murray (Modern pentathlon); Emma Pooley (Road cycling); Tiffany Porter (Track and field); The Members of the Royal & Ancient; Golf Club at St Andrews (Golf)	
October			
November			
December			

=== 2015 ===
Month	Winner	Other Nominations	Ref
January		Katie Summerhayes (Skiing); Heather Watson (Tennis); Stephanie Roche (Association football); Sarah Outen (Adventure)	
February		Katarina Johnson-Thompson (Track and field); Jade Jones (Taekwondo); Sarah Storey (Track and Road cycling); Samantha Murray (Modern pentathlon); Katy McLean (Rugby union)	
March		Lizzy Yarnold (Skeleton); Heather Watson (Tennis); Zoe Gillings (Snowboarding); Nina Carberry (National hunt racing); Bethany Firth (Swimming)	
April		Anastasia Chitty (Rowing); Ellie and Becky Downie (Artistic gymnastics); Jazmin Carlin (Swimming); Charlotte Dujardin (Equestrian); Dani King (Road cycling)	
May		Dina Asher-Smith (Track and field); Rachel Atherton (Downhill mountain biking); Pamela Cookey (Netball); Bianca Walkden (Taekwondo); Great Britain 4 × 400 m relay team (Track and field)	
June		Samantha Davies (Yachting); Great Britain national team (Field hockey); Kat Copeland and Charlotte Taylor (Rowing); Nicola Adams (Amateur boxing); Hannah Barnes (Road cycling)	
July		England national team (Association football); Tully Kearney (Swimming); Jordanne Whiley (Tennis); Shu Pillinger (Ultra cycling); Shara Proctor (Track and field)	
August		Jessica Ennis-Hill (Track and field); Bianca Walkden (Taekwondo); Victoria Pendleton (Amateur jockey); Maddie Hinch (Field hockey); Rachel Atherton (Downhill mountain biking)	
September		Danielle Carter (Association football); Non Stanford and Vicky Holland (Triathlon); Johanna Konta (Tennis); Lizzie Armistead (Road cycling); Abbey Ling, Charlotte Kerwood and Kirsty Barr (Trap shooting)	
October			
November			
December			

== See also ==
- List of sports awards honoring women
- Sunday Times and Sky Sports Sportswomen of the Year Awards
- BBC Sports Personality of the Year
- BBC Scotland Sports Personality of the Year
- BBC Wales Sports Personality of the Year
