= William Hill Sportswoman of the Year =

Award

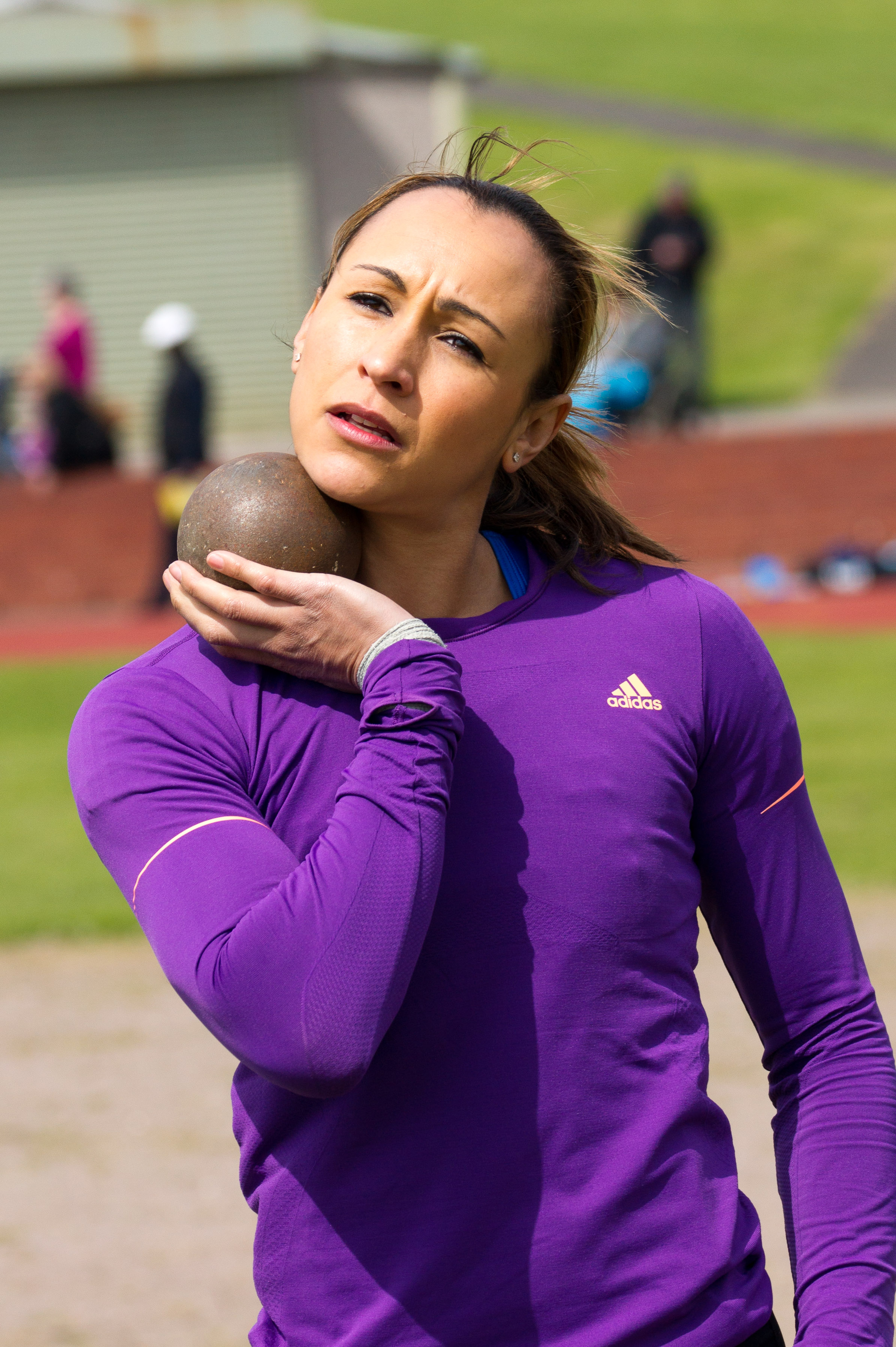
- The last recipient Jessica Ennis-Hill
- Country: Great Britain
- Presented by: William Hill
- First award: 2011
- Final award: 2012
- Last winner: Jessica Ennis-Hill (2012)

Highlights
- Most awards: Hayley Turner, Jessica Ennis-Hill (1)

The William Hill Sportswoman of the Year Award was an award, which was first handed out in 2011, after William Hill decided to launch an award with a women-only shortlist to vote for after the BBC failed to announce any female nominations for the 2011 BBC Sports Personality of the Year Award, which caused somewhat of a public outcry.

No award has been given out since 2012.

== Winners and nominees ==
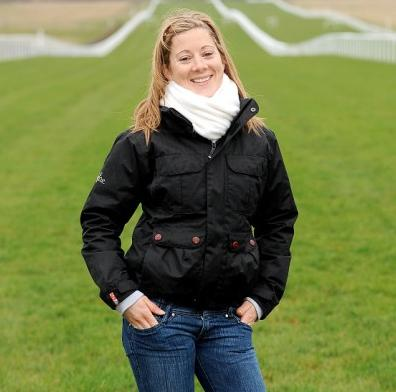
Hayley Turner won the first award.

=== 2011 ===
Hayley Turner	Horse racing
Rebecca Adlington	Swimming
Charlotte Edwards	Cricket
Jessica Ennis	Athletics
Tamsin Greenway	Netball
Helen Jenkins	Triathlon
Sarah Stevenson	Taekwondo
Kelly Smith	Football
Beth Tweddle	Artistic gymnastics
Chrissie Wellington	Ironman Triathlon

=== 2012 ===
Jessica Ennis	Athletics
Hannah Cockroft	Athletics
Beth Tweddle	Artistic gymnastics
Hayley Turner	Horse racing
Ellie Simmonds	Swimming
Victoria Pendleton	Track cycling
Steph Houghton	Football
Laura Trott	Track cycling
Sarah Storey	Track and Road cycling
Laura Robson	Tennis

== See also ==
- List of sports awards honoring women
