= Toni Minichiello =

British athletics coach

Antonio 'Toni' Minichiello (born 1966) is an athletics commentator and former coach. He was coach to British athletics champion Jessica Ennis-Hill until her retirement. The pair met at the Don Valley athletics stadium when Ennis was at a summer holiday camp as a teenager. Since then Ennis has gone on to win numerous athletic medals, including the gold medal at the London 2012 Olympic Games.

Minichiello was born in Sheffield to Italian parents who were originally from Avellino, near Naples. They had originally met and married in Bedford before moving to Sheffield, where Minichiello's father was a steelworker. Toni Minichiello was formerly married to bobsledder Nicola Minichiello.

Minichiello coached Jessica Ennis from the age of 13.

== Awards ==
Minichiello won the BBC Sports Personality of the Year Coach Award in 2012 after guiding Ennis to Olympic gold in the Heptathlon at the London 2012 Olympic games.

He also won the Coach of the Year at the UK Coaching Awards.

== Lifetime ban ==
On 9 August 2022, UK Athletics announced that Minichiello had been banned for life from training athletes due to sexually inappropriate behaviour, emotional abuse and bullying. An investigation had been launched after complaints were received from multiple female athletes and coaches.
