= Rebecca Wardell =

Olympic heptathlete (born 1977)

Personal information
- Full name: Rebecca Jane Wardell
- Born: 21 December 1977 (age 48) Oamaru, New Zealand
- Height: 1.74 m (5 ft 9 in)
- Weight: 66 kg (146 lb)

Sport
- Country: New Zealand
- Sport: Athletics
- Updated on 24 April 2013

Rebecca Wardell (born 21 December 1977) is a New Zealand athlete who competes in the combined events.

She has competed in the women's heptathlon at the 2006 Commonwealth Games at Melbourne, the 2008 Summer Olympics at Beijing, and the 2010 Commonwealth Games at Delhi.

Wardell completed a master's degree in transport engineering at the University of Canterbury. Wardell now works at the International Olympic Committee in the Sports Department.

== Competition record ==
Year	Competition	Venue	Position	Event	Notes
Representing New Zealand
2003	World Championships	Paris, France	20th (h)	400 m hurdles	56.51
2005	Universiade	İzmir, Turkey	9th	Heptathlon	5566 pts
2006	Commonwealth Games	Melbourne, Australia	7th	Heptathlon	5845 pts
2008	Olympic Games	Beijing, China	22nd	Heptathlon	5989 pts
2010	Commonwealth Games	Delhi, India	–	Heptathlon	DNF
