= Athletics at the 2005 Summer Universiade – Women's heptathlon =

The women's heptathlon event at the 2005 Summer Universiade was held on 15–16 August in İzmir, Turkey.

== Results ==
The highest mark recorded in each event is highlighted in yellow

Rank	Athlete	Nationality	100m H	HJ	SP	200m	LJ	JT	800m	Points	Notes
1st place, gold medalist(s)	Lyudmyla Blonska	Ukraine	13.47	1.78	13.03	24.25	6.38	44.57	2:15.97	6297	
2nd place, silver medalist(s)	Simone Oberer	Switzerland	13.93	1.84	11.89	25.57	6.42	38.72	2:16.92	5996	
3rd place, bronze medalist(s)	Jessica Ennis	Great Britain	13.56	1.87	12.26	24.43	6.22	28.94	2:21.08	5910	NJR
4	Katja Keller	Germany	14.04	1.78	12.47	25.67	6.05	43.47	2:19.84	5869	
5	Yvonne Wisse	Netherlands	13.74	1.81	12.43	24.53	5.80	32.57	2:16.55	5811	
6	Viktorija Žemaitytė	Lithuania	14.42	1.78	12.54	25.38	6.04	39.86	2:22.07	5745	
7	Niina Kelo	Finland	14.32	1.66	14.39	26.15	5.54	48.88	2:23.37	5672	
8	Olga Levenkova	Russia	14.21	1.69	12.02	25.42	5.89	37.73	2:16.08	5620	
9	Rebecca Wardell	New Zealand	14.04	1.54	12.29	24.78	5.71	45.97	2:22.06	5566	SB
10	Vasiliki Delinikola	Greece	13.69	1.72	12.20	25.12	5.87	39.62	2:36.83	5532	
11	Silke Bachmann	Germany	15.01	1.72	11.34	26.00	5.52	52.37	2:27.43	5471	
12	Amandine Constantin	France	13.95	1.81	10.32	25.26	5.49	32.80	2:38.64	5205	
13	Cheilín Povea	Cuba	14.29	1.72	9.28	24.52	5.54	23.65	2:15.68	5182	
14	Sema Aydemir	Turkey	15.22	1.57	9.32	26.23	5.19	31.15	2:28.70	4595	
15	Maija Kovalainen	Finland	14.33	1.69	12.59	25.57	NM	39.44	2:45.86	4474	
16	Anu Teesaar	Estonia	15.10	1.66	12.77	27.53	5.32	NM	2:42.07	4211	
17	Ginna von Quednow	Guatemala	17.86	NM	8.62	28.25	4.70	35.18	2:45.28	3122	
	Signe Vest Petersen	Denmark	15.21	1.63	12.31	27.99	DNS	–	–	DNF	
	Öznur Gültekin	Turkey	14.59	1.57	8.92	26.11	DNS	–	–	DNF	
	Coralys Ortiz	Puerto Rico	18.43	1.57	DNS	–	–	–	–	DNF	
