= Sunday Times Sportswomen of the Year Awards =

The Sunday Times Sportswomen of the Year Awards are an awards ceremony that takes place annually, organised by The Sunday Times newspaper.

== History ==
Established in 1988 by the then Editor, Andrew Neil, the Awards are a recognition of the tremendous contribution made by Britain's most prominent sportswomen. The ceremony, which has been held in various locations across London, is among the most prestigious and influential in the British sporting calendar.

Previous winners of the main award, The Sunday Times Sportswoman of the Year, include Paula Radcliffe, Pippa Funnell, Denise Lewis, Dame Kelly Holmes, Zara Phillips and Victoria Pendleton. Sarah Stevenson, the 2011 world Taekwondo champion, was crowned the overall winner in December 2011.

The Awards are supported by the Women's Sport and Fitness Foundation, the Sport and Recreation Alliance, UK Sport and Sport England.

Sky Sports announced in September 2013 that they would partner the Sunday Times Sportwomen of the Year Awards until 2015. It was an extension on the channels support of women's sport and their commitment towards its year-round coverage of women's sport.

== Previous winners ==
Previous winners of The Sunday Times Sportswoman of the Year Award are:

- 1988 Olive Jones
- 1989 Kim Thomas
- 1990 Denise Smith
- 1991 Sally Gunnell
- 1992 Tanni Grey-Thompson
- 1993 Sally Gunnell
- 1994 Denise Lewis
- 1995 Lynn Simpson
- 1996 Laura Davies
- 1997 Alison Nicholas
- 1998 Denise Lewis
- 1999 Paula Radcliffe
- 2000 Denise Lewis
- 2001 Ellen MacArthur
- 2002 Paula Radcliffe
- 2003 Pippa Funnell
- 2004 Dame Kelly Holmes
- 2005 Zara Phillips
- 2006 No award
- 2007 Victoria Pendleton
- 2008 Nicole Cooke
- 2009 Chrissie Wellington
- 2010 Maggie Alphonsi
- 2011 Sarah Stevenson
- 2012 Jessica Ennis
- 2013 Christine Ohuruogu
- 2014 Charlotte Dujardin
- 2015 Dame Jessica Ennis-Hill
- 2016 Laura Kenny
- 2017 Elise Christie
- 2018 Dina Asher-Smith
- 2019 Dina Asher-Smith
- 2020 Hollie Doyle
- 2021 Emma Raducanu
- 2022 Eilish McColgan
- 2023 Mary Earps
- 2024 Keely Hodgkinson
- 2025 Ellie Kildunne

Multiple Winners

Rank	Sportswoman	Total Awards
1	Denise Lewis	3
2	Sally Gunnell	2
2	Paula Radcliffe	2
2	Dame Jessica Ennis-Hill	2
2	Dina Asher-Smith	2

2022 Sunday Times Sportswoman of the Year Awards

Sportswoman of the Year: Eilish McColgan

Team of the Year: England women's national football team

Young Sportswoman of the Year: Jessica Gadirova

Disability Sportswoman of the Year: Maisie Summers-Newton

Helen Rollason Award for Inspiration:

Community Award:

Lifetime Achievement Award:

2017 Sunday Times Sportswoman of the Year Awards

Sportswoman of the Year: Elise Christie

Team of the Year: England women's cricket team

Young Sportswoman of the Year: Ellie Downie

Disability Sportswoman of the Year: Hannah Cockroft

Helen Rollason Award for Inspiration: Anoushé Husain

Community Award: Margaret Palmer

Lifetime Achievement Award: Caz Walton

2016 Sunday Times Sportswoman of the Year Awards

Sportswoman of the Year: Laura Kenny

Olympian of the Year: Helen Glover & Heather Stanning

Paralympian of the Year: Kadeena Cox

Young Sportswoman of the Year: Siobhan-Marie O'Connor

Helen Rollason Award for Inspiration: Hannah Francis

Lifetime Achievement Award: Professor Celia Brackenridge

Community Award: Kirsty Cameron

2015 Sunday Times & Sky Sports Sportswoman of the Year Awards

Sportswoman of the Year: Jessica Ennis-Hill

Team of the Year: England women's national hockey team

Young Sportswoman of the Year: Dina Asher-Smith

Disability Sportswoman of the Year: Jordanne Whiley

Helen Rollason Award for Inspiration: Annie Zaidi

Lifetime Achievement Award: Enid Bakewell

2014 Sunday Times & Sky Sports Sportswoman of the Year Awards

Sportswoman of the Year: Charlotte Dujardin

Young Sportswoman of the Year: Claudia Fragapane

Team of the Year: England rugby union team

Disability Sportswoman of the Year: Stephanie Slater

Community Award: Sue Frett

Lifetime Achievement Award: Louise Martin

Helen Rollason Award for Inspiration: Mel Woodards

2013 Sunday Times & Sky Sports Sportswoman of the Year Awards

Venue: Sky Sports studios

Sportswoman of the Year: Christine Ohuruogu

Young Sportswoman of the Year: Becky James

Team of the Year: England national netball team

Disability Sportswoman of the Year: Amy Marren

Community Award: Rimla Akhtar

The Helen Rollason Award for Inspiration: Sarah Winckless

Lifetime Achievement Award: Sarah Springman

2012 Sunday Times Sportswomen of the Year Awards

Venue: The Sunday Times offices

Sportswoman of the Year: Jessica Ennis

Young Sportswoman of the Year: Laura Robson and Heather Watson

Olympian of the Year: Katherine Grainger

Paralympian of the Year: Sarah Storey

Young Olympian of the Year: Jade Jones

Young Paralympian of the Year: Ellie Simmonds

Team of the Year: GB team pursuit cycling squad (Dani King, Laura Trott and Joanna Rowsell)

Community Award: Di Redfern

Coach of the Year: Jenny Archer

The Helen Rollason Award for Inspiration: Claire Lomas

Lifetime Achievement Award: Baroness Sue Campbell

2011 Sunday Times Sportswomen of the Year awards

Venue: The Sunday Times offices

Sportswoman of the Year: Sarah Stevenson

Runner-up: Hayley Turner

Team of the Year: Europe's Solheim Cup team, captained by Alison Nicholas

Young Sportswoman of the Year: Lucy Garner

Disabled Sportswoman of the Year: Anne Dunham

2010 Sunday Times Sportswomen of the Year awards

Venue: British Olympic Association offices

Sportswoman of the Year: Maggie Alphonsi

Runner-up: Beth Tweddle

Third place: Amy Williams

Team of the Year: Katherine Grainger and Anna Watkins

Young Sportswoman of the Year: Francesca Halsall

Disabled Sportswoman of the Year: Danielle Brown

2009 Sunday Times Sportswomen of the Year awards

Venue: David Beckham Academy

Sportswoman of the Year: Chrissie Wellington

Runner-up: Jessica Ennis

Third place: Victoria Pendleton

Team of the Year: England women's cricket team

CCPR Lifetime Achievement Award: Rachael Heyhoe-Flint

Sport England Community Club Volunteer Award: Cathy Rooney

WSFF Sponsorship of the Year: McDonald's 'Mums on the Ball' campaign

Disabled Sportswoman of the Year: Sarah Storey

Sports Businesswoman Award: Karen Earl

UK Sport Young Sportswoman of the Year: Holly Colvin

The Helen Rollason Award for Inspiration: Dee Caffari

PE Teacher of the Year Award: Caroline Sidell, South Bromsgrove High, Worcestershire

Sports Leader of the Year: Hope Powell

2008 Sunday Times Sportswomen of the Year Awards

Venue: Lord's cricket ground

Sportswoman of the Year: Nicole Cooke

Runner-up: Victoria Pendleton

Third place: Hayley Turner

Team of the Year England women's cricket team

UK Sport Olympian of the Year: Rebecca Adlington

Paralympian of the Year: Eleanor Simmonds

CCPR Unsung Hero Award: Wendy Coles

David Lloyd Leisure PE Teacher of the Year: Cheryl Buckley (Baxter College, Kidderminster, Worcestershire)

MCC Young Sportswoman of the Year: Laura Robson

Sport England Community Club Volunteer Award: Kay Stokes

The Helen Rollason Award for Inspiration: Julie Shard

WSFF Sponsorship of the Year: The Co-operative (Netball Olympic bid)

2007 Sunday Times Sportswomen of the Year Awards

Venue: Lord's cricket ground

Sportswoman of the Year: Victoria Pendleton

Runner-up: Katherine Grainger

Third place: Christine Ohuruogu

Pindar Team of the Year: Arsenal Ladies

Sony Ericsson Lifetime Achievement Award: Billie Jean King

Unsung Hero Award: Cherry Alexander

MCC Young Sportswoman of the Year: Shanaze Reade

The Champions Award: Nicole Arthur

University Sporting Achievement of the Year: Jessica Ennis

PE Teacher of the Year: Helen Finbow (Woodhey High School, Ramsbottom, Greater Manchester)

The Helen Rollason Award for Inspiration: Joanna Gardiner, University of Brighton

Sony Ericsson Overseas Sportswoman of the Year Award: Carolina Klüft

== See also ==
- List of sports awards honoring women
