= Great CityGames =

The Great CityGames is a major street athletics event held twice annually in Manchester, Newcastle and Gateshead.

The former is held in conjunction to the Great Manchester Run, a major 10k generally held on the Sunday. The first event was in May 2009.

The latter is held in conjunction to the Great North Run, a major half marathon attracting world-famous athletes. The first event was in September 2009.

The event was originally designed to promote the Great Runs, however, the Games soon became a major British athletics event, attracting famous athletes such as Usain Bolt, David Rudisha and Kim Collins.

== Events at the Manchester Games ==
=== Men's ===
Event	17	16	15	14	13	12	11	10	09
60m									•
100m	•	•	•	•	•	•		•	
Club 100m	•								
Junior 100m		•							
T44 100m	•								
150m	•	•	•	•	•	•	•	•	•
Junior 150m			•						
200m									
T44 200m									
500m		•							
Mile		•			•	•	•		•
2 miles							•	•	
110m hurdles	•	•	•	•	•	•	•	•	
200m hurdles	•		•	•					
Shot put									•
Long jump	•	•	•	•	•	•	•	•	•
Pole vault					•			•	•
Total	7	7	7	5	6	5	5	6	6

=== Women's ===
Event	17	16	15	14	13	12	11	10	09
100m	•	•			•	•	•		
Club 100m	•								
Junior 100m		•							
T44 100m	•								
150m		•	•		•	•	•	•	•
Junior 150m			•						
200m				•					
500m		•							
Mile		•			•	•	•	•	•
2 miles									•
100m hurdles	•	•	•	•	•	•	•	•	
200m hurdles			•	•					
Long jump			•						
T44 long jump					•				
Pole vault	•	•	•	•		•	•		
Total	5	6	6	4	5	5	5	3	3

=== Mixed ===
Event	17	16	15	14	13	12	11	10	09
2x200m			•						
Total			1						
