= Laureus World Sports Award for Comeback of the Year =

Annual award

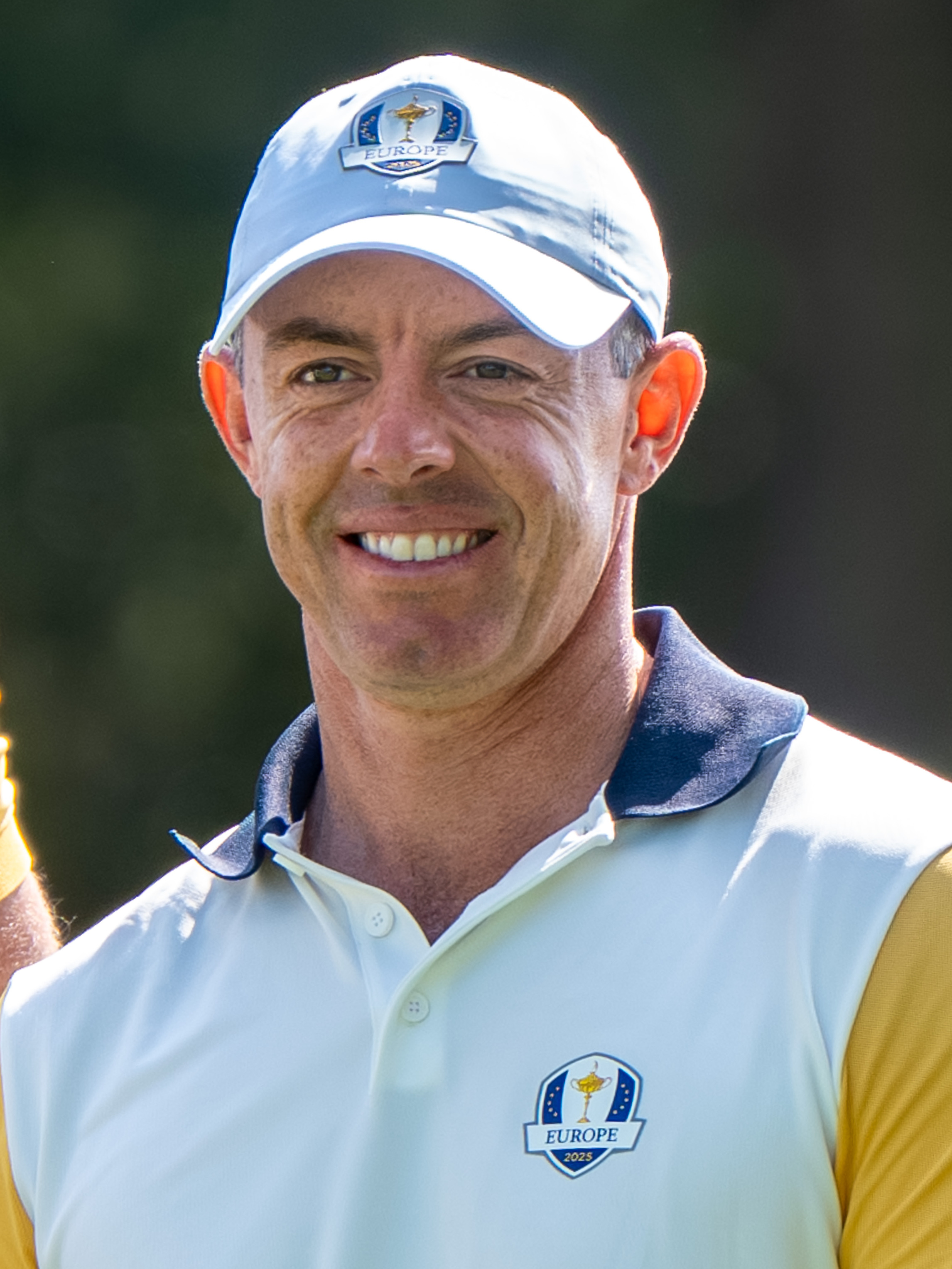
- Awarded for: "sportsperson or team who has overcome injury, illness, adversity, disappointment or failure and risen back to triumph in the sporting arena. The Award may also mark a historic fightback by an individual or a team in a sporting event or series of sports events."
- Location: Madrid (2026)
- Presented by: Laureus Sport for Good Foundation
- First award: 2000
- Currently held by: (United Kingdom) Rory McIlroy (2026)
- Website: Official website

The Laureus World Sports Award for Comeback of the Year is an annual award to honor an individual or team who have made a comeback in sports. First presented in 2000, it is one of the seven awards presented during the annual Laureus World Sports Awards of the Laureus Sport for Good Foundation, a global organisation involved in more than 150 charity projects supporting 500,000 young people. The awards are considered highly prestigious and are frequently referred to as the sporting equivalent of the Oscars.

Each year, a panel composed of the "world's leading sports editors, writers and broadcasters" makes a shortlist of candidates, of which one winner is chosen by the Laureus World Sports Academy. At the ceremony, which was first held on 25 May 2000 in Monte Carlo and since at various locations around the world, the winner receives a Laureus statuette created by Cartier.

The first winner of the award was American road cyclist Lance Armstrong, who had recovered from testicular cancer to win the 1999 Tour de France. After Armstrong admitted to doping in 2013, Laureus rescinded his awards and nominations. As of 2023, the award has been won by a different individual sportsperson every year (seven to women, 17 to men), although eleven teams have been nominated – the England men's cricket team (2005), Miami Heat (2007), the Great Britain national rugby league team (2008), Crusaders (2012), Queensland Reds (2012), European Ryder Cup Team (2013), Germany Men's Olympic Eights Team (2013), Oracle Team USA (2014), FC Barcelona (2018), Chapecoense (2018) and Liverpool F.C. (2022). Tennis players dominate the winners list, with seven awards, while athletes, golfers and rugby union players have won twice. The 2026 winner of the award was the Northern Irish professional golfer Rory McIlroy.

== List of winners and nominees ==
Key
*	Indicates individual whose award or nomination was later rescinded

Laureus World Sports Award for Comeback of the Year winners and nominees
Year	Image	Winner	Nationality	Sport	Nominees	Refs
2000	Lance Armstrong in 2001	Lance Armstrong*	USA	Cycling	Andre Agassi (USA) – tennis Ludmila Engquist (SWE) – athletics	
2001	Jennifer Capriati in 2004	Jennifer Capriati	USA	Tennis	Heike Drechsler (GER) – athletics Janica Kostelić (CRO) – alpine skiing Mario Lemieux (CAN) – ice hockey Dara Torres (USA) – swimming	
2002	Goran Ivanisevic in 2004	Goran Ivanišević	CRO	Tennis	John Daly (USA) – golf Michael Jordan (USA) – basketball Bernhard Langer (GER) – golf Mario Lemieux (CAN) – ice hockey	
2003	Ronaldo in 2005	Ronaldo	BRA	Football	Janica Kostelić (CRO) – alpine skiing Hermann Maier (AUT) – alpine skiing Pete Sampras (USA) – tennis Franziska van Almsick (GER) – swimming	
2004	Hermann Maier in 2006	Hermann Maier	AUT	Alpine skiing	Fred Couples (USA) – golf Inge de Bruijn (NED) – swimming Peter Forsberg (SWE) – ice hockey Martina Navratilova (USA) – tennis Alex Zanardi (ITA) – auto racing	
2005	Alex Zanardi in 2007	Alex Zanardi	ITA	Auto racing	John Daly (USA) – golf England Men's Cricket Team (ENG) – cricket Tadahiro Nomura (JPN) – judo Paula Radcliffe (ENG) – athletics Shane Warne (AUS) – cricket	
2006	Martina Hingis in 2006	Martina Hingis	SUI	Tennis	Kajsa Bergqvist (SWE) – athletics Kim Clijsters (BEL) – tennis Antoine Dénériaz (FRA) – alpine skiing Jonah Lomu (NZL) – rugby union Colin Montgomerie (SCO) – golf	
2007	Serena Williams in 2007	Serena Williams	USA	Tennis	Drew Brees (USA) – American football Ben Curtis (USA) – golf Roy Jones Jr. (USA) – boxing Miami Heat (USA) – basketball Zinedine Zidane (FRA) – football	
2008	Paula Radcliffe in 2008	Paula Radcliffe	GBR	Athletics	Christine Ohuruogu (GBR) – athletics Great Britain national rugby league team (GBR) – rugby league Jana Rawlinson (AUS) – athletics Steve Stricker (USA) – golf Jonny Wilkinson (GBR) – rugby union	
2009	Vitali Klitschko in 2009	Vitali Klitschko	UKR	Boxing	Anna Meares (AUS) – cycling Greg Norman (AUS) – golf Matthias Steiner (GER) – weightlifting Maarten van der Weijden (NED) – swimming Tiger Woods (USA) – golf	
2010	Kim Clijsters in 2010	Kim Clijsters	BEL	Tennis	Lance Armstrong* (USA) – cycling Jessica Ennis (GBR) – athletics Brett Favre (USA) – American football Blanka Vlašić (CRO) – athletics Tom Watson (USA) – golf	
2011	Valentino Rossi in 2010	Valentino Rossi	ITA	MotoGP	Carolina Klüft (SWE) – athletics Merlene Ottey (SLO) – athletics Tyson Gay (USA) – athletics Justine Henin (BEL) – tennis Paula Creamer (USA) – golf	
2012	Darren Clarke in 2009	Darren Clarke	GBR	Golf	Crusaders (NZL) – rugby union Eric Abidal (FRA) – football Queensland Reds (AUS) – rugby union Liu Xiang (CHN) – athletics Sergio García (ESP) – golf	
2013	Felix Sanchez in 2013	Félix Sánchez	DOM	Athletics	Anna Meares (AUS) – cycling Ernie Els (RSA) – golf Europe Ryder Cup Team (Europe) – golf Germany Men's Olympic Eights Team (GER) – rowing Tirunesh Dibaba (ETH) – athletics	
2014	Rafael Nadal in 2014	Rafael Nadal	ESP	Tennis	Yelena Isinbayeva (RUS) – athletics Oracle Team USA (USA) – sailing Tony Parker (FRA) – basketball Ronaldinho (BRA) – football Tiger Woods (USA) – golf	
2015	Schalk Burger in 2008	Schalk Burger	RSA	Rugby union	Francesco Acerbi (ITA) – football Diego Milito (ARG) – football Jo Pavey (GBR) – athletics Pierre Vaultier (FRA) – snowboarding Oliver Wilson (GBR) – golf	
2016	Dan Carter in 2011	Dan Carter	NZL	Rugby union	Jessica Ennis-Hill (GBR) – athletics Mick Fanning (AUS) – surfing Michael Phelps (USA) – swimming David Rudisha (KEN) – athletics Lindsey Vonn (USA) – alpine skiing	
2017	Michael Phelps in 2017	Michael Phelps	USA	Swimming	Ruth Beitia (ESP) – athletics Juan Martín del Potro (ARG) – tennis Fabienne St Louis (MUS) – triathlon Nick Skelton (GBR) – equestrian Aksel Lund Svindal (NOR) – alpine skiing	
2018	Federer in 2016	Roger Federer	SUI	Tennis	FC Barcelona (ESP) – football Justin Gatlin (USA) – athletics Sally Pearson (AUS) – athletics Valentino Rossi (ITA) – MotoGP; Chapecoense (BRA) – football	
2019	Woods in 2018	Tiger Woods	USA	Golf	Vinesh Phogat (IND) – freestyle wrestling Yuzuru Hanyu (JPN) – figure skating Mark McMorris (CAN) – snowboarding Lindsey Vonn (USA) – alpine skiing Bibian Mentel-Spee (NED) – para-snowboarding	
2020	Flörsch in 2016	Sophia Flörsch	GER	Auto racing	Andy Murray (GBR) – tennis Christian Lealiifano (AUS) – rugby union Kawhi Leonard (USA) – basketball Liverpool F.C. (GBR) – football Nathan Adrian (USA) – swimming	
2021	–	Max Parrot	CAN	Snowboarding	Daniel Bard (USA) – baseball Kento Momota (JPN) – badminton Alex Morgan (USA) – football Mikaela Shiffrin (USA) – alpine skiing Alex Smith (USA) – American football	
2022	Brown in 2020	Sky Brown	GBR	Skateboarding	Simone Biles (USA) – gymnastics Mark Cavendish (GBR) – cycling Tom Daley (GBR) – diving Marc Márquez (ESP) – MotoGP; Annemiek van Vleuten (NED) – cycling	
2023	Eriksen in 2014	Christian Eriksen	DEN	Football	Annemiek van Vleuten (NLD) – cycling Francesco Bagnaia (ITA) – MotoGP; Jakob Ingebrigtsen (NOR) – athletics Klay Thompson (USA) – basketball Tiger Woods (USA) – golf	
2024	Simone Biles	Simone Biles	USA	Gymnastics	Katarina Johnson-Thompson (GBR) – athletics Siya Kolisi (RSA) – rugby sevens Sébastien Haller (CIV) – association football Jamal Murray (CAN) – basketball Marketa Vondrousova (CZE) – tennis	
2025	Rebeca Andrade	Rebeca Andrade	BRA	Gymnastics	Caeleb Dressel (USA) – swimming Lara Gut-Behrami (SUI) – alpine skiing Marc Márquez (ESP) – MotoGP; Rishabh Pant (IND) – cricket Ariarne Titmus (AUS) – swimming	
2026		Rory McIlroy	GBR	Golf	Amanda Anisimova (USA) – tennis Egan Bernal (COL) – cycling Yulimar Rojas (VEN) – athletics Leah Williamson (GBR) – football Simon Yates (GBR) – cycling	

== Statistics ==
Statistics are correct as of 2026 awards.

Winners by nationality
Country	Winners	Nominations
USA	5	35
GBR	4	17
BRA	2	3
ITA	2	3
SUI	2	0
GER	1	5
ESP	1	5
CAN	1	4
CRO	1	3
BEL	1	2
NZL	1	2
RSA	1	2
AUT	1	1
DOM	1	0
UKR	1	0
DEN	1	0
AUS	0	10
FRA	0	5
NED	0	4
SWE	0	4
JPN	0	3
ARG	0	2
ENG	0	2
IND	0	2
CHN	0	1
CIV	0	1
COL	0	1
CZE	0	1
ETH	0	1
Europe	0	1
KEN	0	1
MUS	0	1
NOR	0	1
RUS	0	1
SCO	0	1
SLO	0	1
SUI	0	1
VEN	0	1

Winners by sport
Sport	Winners	Nominations
Tennis	8	9
Golf	3	17
Athletics	2	21
Football	2	10
Rugby union	2	5
Gymnastics	2	2
Alpine skiing	1	9
Swimming	1	8
MotoGP	1	3
Auto racing	1	2
Snowboarding	1	2
Boxing	1	1
Skateboarding	1	1
Cycling	0	6
Basketball	0	4
American football	0	3
Cricket	0	3
Ice hockey	0	3
Badminton	0	1
Baseball	0	1
Diving	0	1
Figure skating	0	1
Freestyle wrestling	0	1
Judo	0	1
Para-snowboarding	0	1
Rowing	0	1
Rugby league	0	1
Sailing	0	1
Surfing	0	1
Triathlon	0	1
Weightlifting	0	1
