= UK Sport =

Government sport agency

Coordinates: 51°31′24″N 0°7′29″W

- Predecessor: Sports Council of Great Britain
- Formation: 6 January 1997; 29 years ago
- Purpose: Investing into Olympic and Paralympic sport in the UK
- Headquarters: London, WC1
- Chair: Nick Webborn
- CEO: Sally Munday
- Parent organization: Department for Culture, Media and Sport
- Affiliations: British Olympic Association; British Paralympic Association; English Institute of Sport; UK Anti-Doping; The National Lottery
- Staff: 90
- Website: uksport.gov.uk

UK Sport is the government agency responsible for investing money sourced from the National Lottery and the government, into Olympic and Paralympic sport in the United Kingdom. It is an executive non-departmental public body sponsored by the Department for Culture, Media and Sport.

It was created in 1997, following a "rock bottom" showing at the 1996 Summer Olympics where Team GB won just one solitary gold medal. Team GB and Paralympics GB went on to place third in the medal table at London 2012 and second in the table at Rio 2016.

== Funding ==
UK Sport currently invests around £345m in summer Olympic and Paralympic sports and £24m in winter Olympic and Paralympic sports. These investments are spread over a four-year cycle ahead of the Tokyo and Beijing Olympic and Paralympic Games respectively.

The investments are made through Athlete Performance Awards which are paid directly to the athlete and contribute to their living and sporting costs and through central funding to sport National Governing Bodies to invest in coaches, facilities and sports science and medicine.

== See also ==
- English Institute of Sport
- Sport in the United Kingdom
