= UK Sports Institute =

- Formation: 14 May 2002; 24 years ago
- Type: Government agency
- Legal status: Company limited by guarantee (No. 4420052)
- Purpose: Development of sport in England
- Headquarters: Head Office
- Location(s): The Manchester Institute of Health and Performance 299 Alan Turing Way Manchester M11 3BS
- Region served: England
- National Director: Nigel Walker
- Main organ: Board
- Parent organization: Department for Culture, Media and Sport
- Affiliations: British Olympic Association; UK Sport; Sport England; The National Lottery
- Staff: 250
- Website: uksportsinstitute.co.uk
- Formerly called: English Institute of Sport

The UK Sports Institute, previously known as the English Institute of Sport (EIS), established in May 2002, is an organisation which provides sport science and medical support services to elite athletes through a nationwide network of expertise and facilities, working with Olympic and Paralympic summer and winter sports, as well as English and a number of professional sports.

== Structure ==
A grant funded organisation through UK Sport, Olympic and Paralympic sports are able to engage with EIS services through their Programme funding from UK Sport, English sports through their Sport England funding and professional sports through their respective funding bodies.

The UK Sports Institute also works with a range of other sports organisations, including national governing bodies of sport, professional sports teams, and individual athletes.

== Centres ==
It is headquartered in Manchester, with regional centers in Bath, Bisham Abbey, Loughborough, London, and Sheffield.

Services are delivered from nine UK Sports Institute High Performance Centres across the country, as well as at a number of additional partner sites.

EIS High Performance Centres
Lilleshall National Sports Centre
Loughborough University
National Water Sports Centre, Holme Pierrepont, Nottingham
Alexander Stadium, Birmingham
Manchester Institute of Health and Performance
Bisham Abbey National Sports Centre
University of Bath
English Institute of Sport, Sheffield

== See also ==
- UK Sport
- Sport in England
- Scottish Institute of Sport
- Sport Wales National Centre
- Sports Institute for Northern Ireland
