= Kylie Wheeler =

Australian heptathlete

Personal information
- Born: 17 January 1980 (age 46)
Medal record
Women's Athletics
Representing Australia
Commonwealth Games
Silver medal – second place	2002 Manchester	Heptathlon
Silver medal – second place	2006 Melbourne	Heptathlon
Universiade
Gold medal – first place	2003 Daegu	Heptathlon

Kylie Wheeler (born 17 January 1980 in Subiaco) is an Australian retired heptathlete.

Wheeler is a six-times Australia national champion in heptathlon in 2003, 2004, 2005, 2006, 2007 and 2008. Wheeler also won a silver medal in the Athletics at the 2002 Commonwealth Games and 2006 Commonwealth Games and won the event also at the 2003 Summer Universiade.

She announced her retirement from the sport in order to follow other commitments and interests outside athletics in May 2009. She is now Head Athletics Coach at Guildford Grammar.
