= Garrick Cowley =

- Born: Garrick James Cowley; 23 April 1982 (age 44) Rotorua, New Zealand
- Height: 1.83 m (6 ft 0 in)
- Weight: 105.5 kg (16 st 9 lb)
- Notable relatives: Sarah Cowley (sister); Angus Ross (brother-in-law)

Rugby union career
- Position: Scrum-Half
- Current team: Exeter Chiefs
Senior career
Years	Team	Apps	(Points)
- Bay Of Plenty
2006–2009	Bressane		
2009–2010	Esher		
2010–2011	Exeter Chiefs		
2011–	Valley RFC Hong Kong		
International career
Years	Team	Apps	(Points)
2005–	Samoa	4	(4)

Garrick Cowley is a rugby union player. He previously played for Exeter Chiefs in the Aviva Premiership. He signed with Esher in the summer of 2010.

== Personal life ==
Cowley was born to a Samoan father and his mother was a Pākehā European New Zealander. His sister, Sarah Cowley is a track and field athlete who represented New Zealand at the 2012 Summer Olympics in the women's heptathlon event.
