= Kristina Savitskaya =

Russian track and field athlete

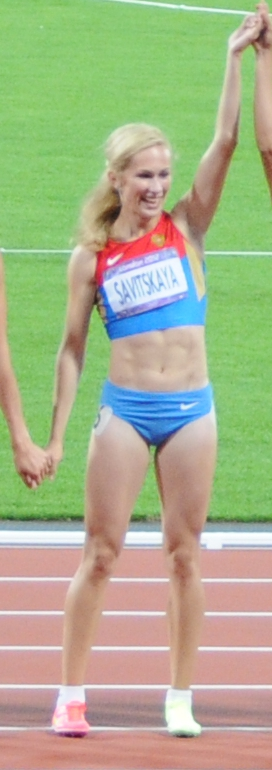
- Savitskaya at the 2012 Summer Olympics

Personal information
- Born: June 10, 1991 (age 35)
- Height: 1.80 m (5 ft 11 in)
- Weight: 72 kg (159 lb)

Sport
- Country: Russia
- Sport: Women's athletics
- Event: Heptathlon
- Coached by: Vladimir Slushkin
- Updated on 4 August 2012

Kristina Savitskaya (Russian: Кристина Савицкая born 10 June 1991) is a Russian track and field athlete. She competed at the 2012 Summer Olympics in the women's heptathlon event. In the 800 m event of the heptathlon, her foot crossed the lane-marking line too early, but this led to a mistaken disqualification of Lilli Schwarzkopf in the neighbouring lane. However, the disqualification was rescinded when Schwarzkopf pointed out the error. Savitskaya's final place was corrected from seventh to eighth.

She won the national title at the Russian Athletics Championships in 2012 and 2013.

== International competitions ==
Representing Russia
Year	Competition	Venue	Position	Event	Result	Notes
2011	European U23 Championships	Ostrava, Czech Republic	7th	Heptathlon	5834	
2012	Olympic Games	London, United Kingdom	6th	Heptathlon	6452	Originally 8th (Tatyana Chernova and Lyudmyla Yosypenko disqualified)
2013	Universiade	Kazan, Russia	4th	Heptathlon	6096	Originally 5th (Tatyana Chernova disqualified)
2013	World Championships	Moscow, Russia	—	Heptathlon	DNF	Did not start 800 m
