= Athletics at the 2009 Summer Universiade – Women's heptathlon =

The women's heptathlon event at the 2009 Summer Universiade was held on 10–11 July.

== Medalists ==
Gold	Silver	Bronze
Jessica Samuelsson; Sweden	Jana Korešová; Czech Republic	Cristina Bárcena; Spain

== Results ==
=== 100 metres hurdles ===
Wind:
Heat 1: +0.2 m/s, Heat 2: -1.3 m/s

Rank	Heat	Name	Nationality	Time	Points	Notes
1	1	Jana Korešová	Czech Republic	13.43	1060	
2	1	Cristina Bárcena	Spain	13.68	1024	
3	1	Sofia Ifantidou	Greece	13.85	1000	
4	1	Jessica Samuelsson	Sweden	14.01	977	
5	1	Tatiana Vtorushina	Russia	14.09	966	
6	2	Ellen Sprunger	Switzerland	14.14	959	
7	1	Megan Wheatley	Australia	14.16	956	
8	2	Sarah Cowley	New Zealand	14.31	935	
9	2	Olga Zaynutdinova	Russia	14.38	925	
10	2	Lauren Foote	Australia	14.79	870	
11	2	Ana Ugarković	Serbia	15.18	818	
12	2	Nahomi Rivera	Puerto Rico	15.47	781	

=== High jump ===
Rank	Group	Athlete	Nationality	1.46	1.49	1.52	1.55	1.58	1.61	1.64	1.67	1.70	1.73	1.76	1.79	1.82	1.85	Result	Points	Notes	Overall
1	A	Lauren Foote	Australia	–	–	–	–	–	–	–	–	o	–	o	o	o	xxx	1.82	1003	SB	1873
2	A	Sarah Cowley	New Zealand	–	–	–	–	–	–	–	–	o	o	o	xxo	xxo	xxx	1.82	1003		1938
3	A	Jana Korešová	Czech Republic	–	–	–	–	–	o	o	o	o	o	o	xxx			1.76	928	PB	1988
4	A	Jessica Samuelsson	Sweden	–	–	–	–	–	–	o	o	o	o	xo	xxx			1.76	928	PB	1905
5	A	Cristina Bárcena	Spain	–	–	–	–	–	–	xo	o	o	xo	xxx				1.73	891		1915
6	A	Tatiana Vtorushina	Russia	–	–	–	–	–	–	xo	o	xo	xo	xxx				1.73	891		1857
7	B	Olga Zaynutdinova	Russia	–	–	–	xo	o	o	o	o	xo	x					1.70	855	SB	1780
8	B	Ellen Sprunger	Switzerland	–	–	–	o	o	o	o	xxo	xxx						1.67	818	SB	1777
9	B	Megan Wheatley	Australia	–	–	–	–	o	o	xo	xxo	xxx						1.67	818		1774
10	B	Sofia Ifantidou	Greece	–	–	o	o	o	o	xxx								1.61	747		1747
11	B	Nahomi Rivera	Puerto Rico	o	xo	o	xo	o	xxo	xxx								1.61	747		1528
	B	Ana Ugarković	Serbia															DNS	0		DNF

=== Shot put ===
Rank	Athlete	Nationality	#1	#2	#3	Result	Points	Notes	Overall
1	Olga Zaynutdinova	Russia	13.65	13.82	13.99	13.99	793		2573
2	Jessica Samuelsson	Sweden	13.04	13.20	x	13.20	741		2646
3	Megan Wheatley	Australia	12.90	13.06	13.03	13.06	731		2505
4	Tatiana Vtorushina	Russia	12.88	x	x	12.88	719		2576
5	Cristina Bárcena	Spain	12.64	12.30	x	12.64	704		2619
6	Sofia Ifantidou	Greece	12.39	11.76	12.27	12.39	687		2434
7	Ellen Sprunger	Switzerland	11.64	11.38	12.15	12.15	671		2448
8	Lauren Foote	Australia	10.92	11.48	12.02	12.02	662		2535
9	Sarah Cowley	New Zealand	x	11.04	11.76	11.76	645		2583
10	Nahomi Rivera	Puerto Rico	11.10	x	10.90	11.10	602		2130
11	Jana Korešová	Czech Republic	9.47	x	10.18	10.18	541		2529

=== 200 metres ===
Wind:
Heat 1: +1.1 m/s, Heat 2: +0.8 m/s

Rank	Heat	Name	Nationality	Time	Points	Notes	Overall
1	1	Ellen Sprunger	Switzerland	23.93	987		3435
2	1	Jessica Samuelsson	Sweden	24.20	962		3608
3	1	Cristina Bárcena	Spain	24.43	940	SB	3559
4	1	Jana Korešová	Czech Republic	24.65	919		3448
5	1	Olga Zaynutdinova	Russia	25.16	872		3445
6	1	Megan Wheatley	Australia	25.22	867		3372
7	2	Lauren Foote	Australia	25.41	850		3385
8	2	Sofia Ifantidou	Greece	25.50	841		3275
9	2	Tatiana Vtorushina	Russia	25.54	838		3414
10	2	Sarah Cowley	New Zealand	25.83	812		3395
11	2	Nahomi Rivera	Puerto Rico	26.82	727	SB	2857

=== Long jump ===
Rank	Athlete	Nationality	#1	#2	#3	Result	Points	Notes	Overall
1	Jana Korešová	Czech Republic	x	5.98	6.27	6.27	934		4382
2	Olga Zaynutdinova	Russia	x	6.00	6.06	6.06	868		4313
3	Tatiana Vtorushina	Russia	5.89	5.74	5.63	5.89	816		4230
4	Jessica Samuelsson	Sweden	5.80	x	5.85	5.85	804		4412
5	Megan Wheatley	Australia	5.65	5.74	5.80	5.80	789		4161
6	Sofia Ifantidou	Greece	5.72	5.74	x	5.74	771		4046
7	Lauren Foote	Australia	5.66	x	5.67	5.67	750		4135
8	Cristina Bárcena	Spain	5.49	5.66	x	5.66	747		4306
9	Ellen Sprunger	Switzerland	5.59	5.48	5.62	5.62	735		4170
10	Nahomi Rivera	Puerto Rico	5.14	5.25	5.20	5.25	628		3485
11	Sarah Cowley	New Zealand	x	5.16	x	5.16	603		3998

=== Javelin throw ===
Rank	Athlete	Nationality	#1	#2	#3	Result	Points	Notes	Overall
1	Sofia Ifantidou	Greece	48.69	49.85	49.77	49.85	857		4903
2	Nahomi Rivera	Puerto Rico	43.84	43.41	44.24	44.24	749		4234
3	Lauren Foote	Australia	36.47	38.27	41.24	41.24	691		4826
4	Ellen Sprunger	Switzerland	40.68	40.36	38.62	40.68	680		4850
5	Megan Wheatley	Australia	35.86	40.04	36.61	40.04	668		4829
6	Cristina Bárcena	Spain	35.27	39.88	36.26	39.88	665		4971
7	Tatiana Vtorushina	Russia	32.82	36.45	28.56	36.45	599		4829
8	Olga Zaynutdinova	Russia	x	35.76	35.53	35.76	586		4899
9	Jana Korešová	Czech Republic	35.64	35.13	33.50	35.64	584		4966
10	Jessica Samuelsson	Sweden	33.17	35.60	x	35.60	583		4995
	Sarah Cowley	New Zealand				DNS	0		DNF

=== 800 metres ===
Rank	Name	Nationality	Time	Points	Notes
1	Jessica Samuelsson	Sweden	2:07.03	1009	
2	Jana Korešová	Czech Republic	2:08.27	990	
3	Ellen Sprunger	Switzerland	2:13.29	917	
4	Megan Wheatley	Australia	2:16.81	867	
5	Cristina Bárcena	Spain	2:17.54	857	
6	Olga Zaynutdinova	Russia	2:18.97	838	
7	Sofia Ifantidou	Greece	2:19.23	834	
8	Lauren Foote	Australia	2:23.80	773	
9	Tatiana Vtorushina	Russia	2:25.54	750	
10	Nahomi Rivera	Puerto Rico	2:30.30	689	

=== Final standings ===
The highest mark recorded in each event is highlighted in yellow

Rank	Athlete	Nationality	100m H	HJ	SP	200m	LJ	JT	800m	Points	Notes
1st place, gold medalist(s)	Jessica Samuelsson	Sweden	14.01	1.76	13.20	24.20	5.85	35.60	2:07.03	6004	SB
2nd place, silver medalist(s)	Jana Korešová	Czech Republic	13.43	1.76	10.18	24.65	6.27	35.64	2:08.27	5956	PB
3rd place, bronze medalist(s)	Cristina Bárcena	Spain	13.68	1.73	12.64	24.43	5.66	39.88	2:17.54	5828	
4	Ellen Sprunger	Switzerland	14.14	1.67	12.15	23.93	5.62	40.68	2:13.29	5767	
5	Olga Zaynutdinova	Russia	14.38	1.70	13.99	25.16	6.06	35.76	2:18.97	5737	SB
6	Sofia Ifantidou	Greece	13.85	1.61	12.39	25.50	5.74	49.85	2:19.23	5737	
7	Megan Wheatley	Australia	14.16	1.67	13.06	25.22	5.80	40.04	2:16.81	5696	
8	Lauren Foote	Australia	14.79	1.82	12.02	25.41	5.67	41.24	2:23.80	5599	
9	Tatiana Vtorushina	Russia	14.09	1.73	12.88	25.54	5.89	36.45	2:25.54	5579	
10	Nahomi Rivera	Puerto Rico	15.47	1.61	11.10	26.82	5.25	44.24	2:30.30	4923	
	Sarah Cowley	New Zealand	14.31	1.82	11.76	25.83	5.16	DNS	–	DNF	
	Ana Ugarković	Serbia	15.18	DNS	–	–	–	–	–	DNF	
