= Teina =

Teina is a given name. Notable persons with the name include:

- Teina Bishop (born 1959), Cooks Islands politician
- Teina Clark (born 1988), Australian rugby player
- Teina Maraeura (1950–2023), French Polynesian politician
- Teina Pora (born 1975), New Zealand man falsely accused of murder
- Teina Teiti (born 1983), Cook Islands sprinter
