= Angus Ross =

Angus Ross may refer to:

- Angus Ross (historian) (1911–2000), professor of history at the University of Otago, New Zealand
- Angus Ross (darts player) (1953–2016), Scottish darts player
- Angus Ross (bobsleigh) (born 1968), New Zealand Olympic representative
