= Sarah Cowley (athlete) =

New Zealand track and field athlete

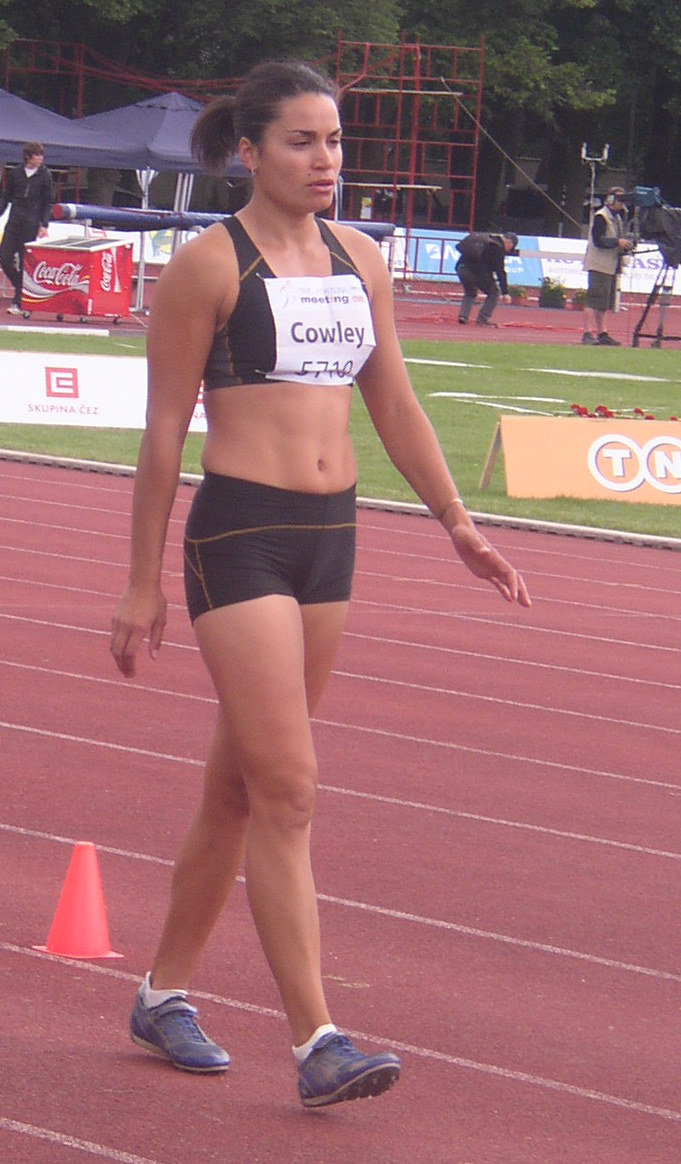
- Sarah Cowley at TNT – Fortuna Meeting in Kladno

Personal information
- Born: 3 February 1984 (age 42) Rotorua, New Zealand
- Height: 1.76 m (5 ft 9 1/2 in)
- Weight: 67 kg (148 lb)
- Spouse: Angus Ross
- Relative: Garrick Cowley (brother)

Sport
- Country: New Zealand
- Sport: Athletics
- Event: Heptathlon
- Coached by: Elena Vinogradova
Medal record
Women's athletics
Representing New Zealand
Oceania Youth Championships
Gold medal – first place	2000 Adelaide	100 m hurdles
Gold medal – first place	2000 Adelaide	High jump
- Updated on 17 May 2013

Sarah Cowley (married name Cowley-Ross, born 3 February 1984) is a New Zealand track and field athlete. She competed at the 2012 Summer Olympics in the women's heptathlon event. She will be reporting from the Tokyo Olympics for TVNZ.

== Personal life ==
Cowley was born to a Samoan father and a Pākehā European New Zealand mother. Her brother Garrick Cowley is a rugby union player who has played for the Samoa national rugby union team.

== Achievements ==
Year	Competition	Venue	Position	Event	Notes
Representing New Zealand
2000	Oceania Youth Championships	Adelaide, Australia	1st	100 m hurdles	15.01 (wind: 1.7 m/s)
2000	Oceania Youth Championships	Adelaide, Australia	1st	High jump	1.71 m
2000	World Junior Championships	Santiago, Chile	9th (h)	4 × 100 m relay	45.71
2005	Universiade	İzmir, Turkey	12th	Long jump	5.50 m
2006	Commonwealth Games	Melbourne, Australia	10th	Heptathlon	4734 pts
2009	Universiade	Belgrade, Serbia	–	Heptathlon	DNF
2011	Universiade	Shenzhen, China	18th	Heptathlon	4662 pts
2012	Olympic Games	London, United Kingdom	26th	Heptathlon	5873 pts
2014	Commonwealth Games	Glasgow, United Kingdom	9th	High jump	1.86 m
