= Chantae McMillan =

American heptathlete (born 1988)

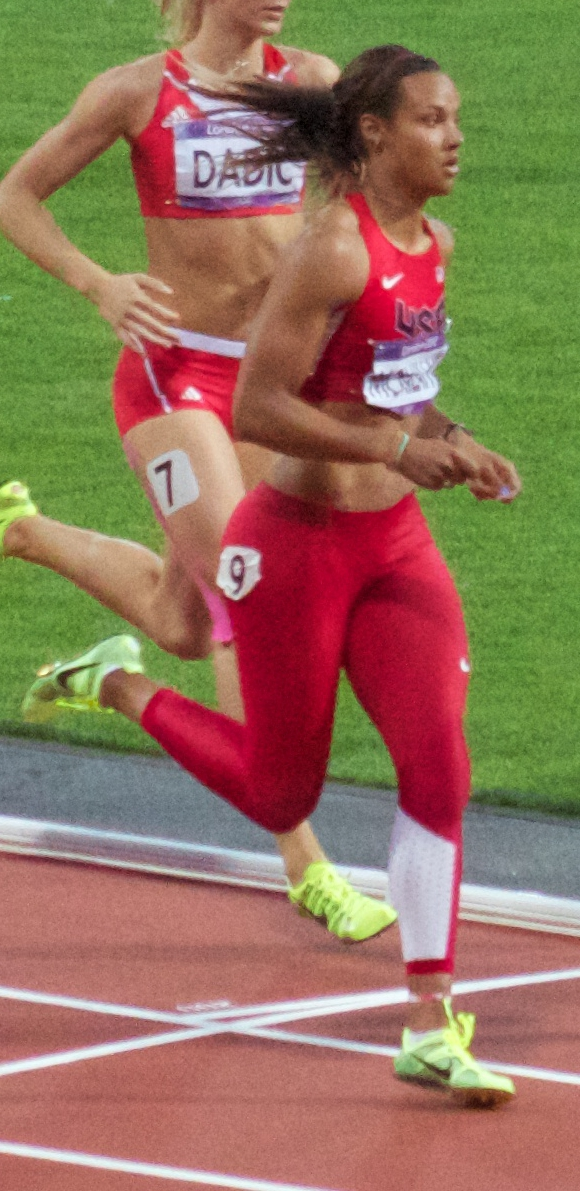
- McMillan competing at the 2012 Olympics

Personal information
- Born: May 1, 1988 (age 38) Fort Campbell, Kentucky, U.S.
- Height: 5 ft 8 in (1.73 m)
- Weight: 152 lb (69 kg)

Sport
- Country: United States
- Sport: Athletics
- Events: Heptathlon, pentathlon, Javelin
- Turned pro: 2011
- Coached by: Kibwe Johnson

Achievements and titles
- Personal bests: Heptathlon: 6326 points Eugene (USA); July 10, 2016; Pentathlon: 4396 points College Station (USA); March 11, 2011

Chantae McMillan (born May 1, 1988) is an American heptathlete who competed at the 2012 Summer Olympics in London.

== Prep career ==
Chantae McMillan attended Rolla High School in Rolla, Missouri, where she competed in the long jump and graduated in 2006. McMillan earned High School All-America accolades by finishing third in the long jump with a leap of 19 ft 4ins at the 2005 Nike Outdoor Nationals.

McMillan placed at the long jump at the Missouri State High School Activities Association outdoor Class 4 state track and field meet all four years. McMillan finished second to Leandra McGruder and earned a silver medal in the long jump as a senior in 2006 (18-9), winning titles as a junior in 2005 (19-5 1/2) and as a sophomore in 2004 (18-11) and earned a silver medal in the long jump as a freshman in 2003 (18-2 1/2).

McMillan won her only triple jump appearance at the state meet as a junior (38-7).

== NCAA ==
McMillan then went to the University of Nebraska–Lincoln. In summer 2007, she became a competitor in combined events (pentathlon and heptathlon). She compiled 4 Big XII Championships and set two school records, graduating as the most accomplished heptathlete in Nebraska Cornhuskers track and field history. McMillan placed fourth in Heptathlon at 2010 NCAA Division I Outdoor Track and Field Championships scoring 5583 points. She placed second in the Pentathlon as a senior at the 2011 NCAA Division I Indoor Track and Field Championships behind Brianne Theisen-Eaton.

== Professional ==
Chantae McMillan placed third scoring 6003 points at 2011 USA Outdoor Track and Field Championships behind Sharon Day 6058 points and Ryann Krais 6030 points.

McMillan qualified for the 2012 London Olympics at the U.S. Olympic trials on June 30, 2012. She placed third at the trials with a score of 6188 points. At the trials, McMillan set personal bests in 100 meter hurdles, 200 meters, shot put, javelin, and 800 meters and achieved the Olympic A standard. At the 2012 Olympics, she finished in 28th place.

On June 20, 2015, McMillan scored 5601 points to place fifth overall in women's heptathlon at the Pan American Combined Events Cup.

In 2015, McMillan posed nude for ESPN’s The Body Issue magazine and was one of the six athletes to be featured on a cover that year. The cover featuring McMillan was nominated for American Society of Magazine Editors’ best cover awards and won the Reader’s Choice Award. The cover also won the Best Cover and Reader’s Choice Award for the Best Sports and Fitness category.

In the 2015–2016 school year, McMillan trained and coached at University of Dayton in preparation for U.S. Olympic trials on July 10, 2016. McMillan placed fifth scoring a personal best 6326 points at the U.S. Olympic trials on July 10, 2016.

== Television ==
Chantae McMillan competed on the NBC television series The Titan Games, and progressed through the competition to become a Titan by beating two-time Olympic gold medallist Claressa Shields. McMillian defended her Titan win against episode competitors once, before being dethroned by Dani Speegle.

== Personal life ==
McMillan is married to Devon Langhorst, a US Army helicopter pilot. Together, they have two sons: Otto, born in October 2018, and Ellis, born in October 2022; and a daughter: McCall, born in January 2025.
