= Brianne Theisen-Eaton =

Canadian athlete (born 1988)

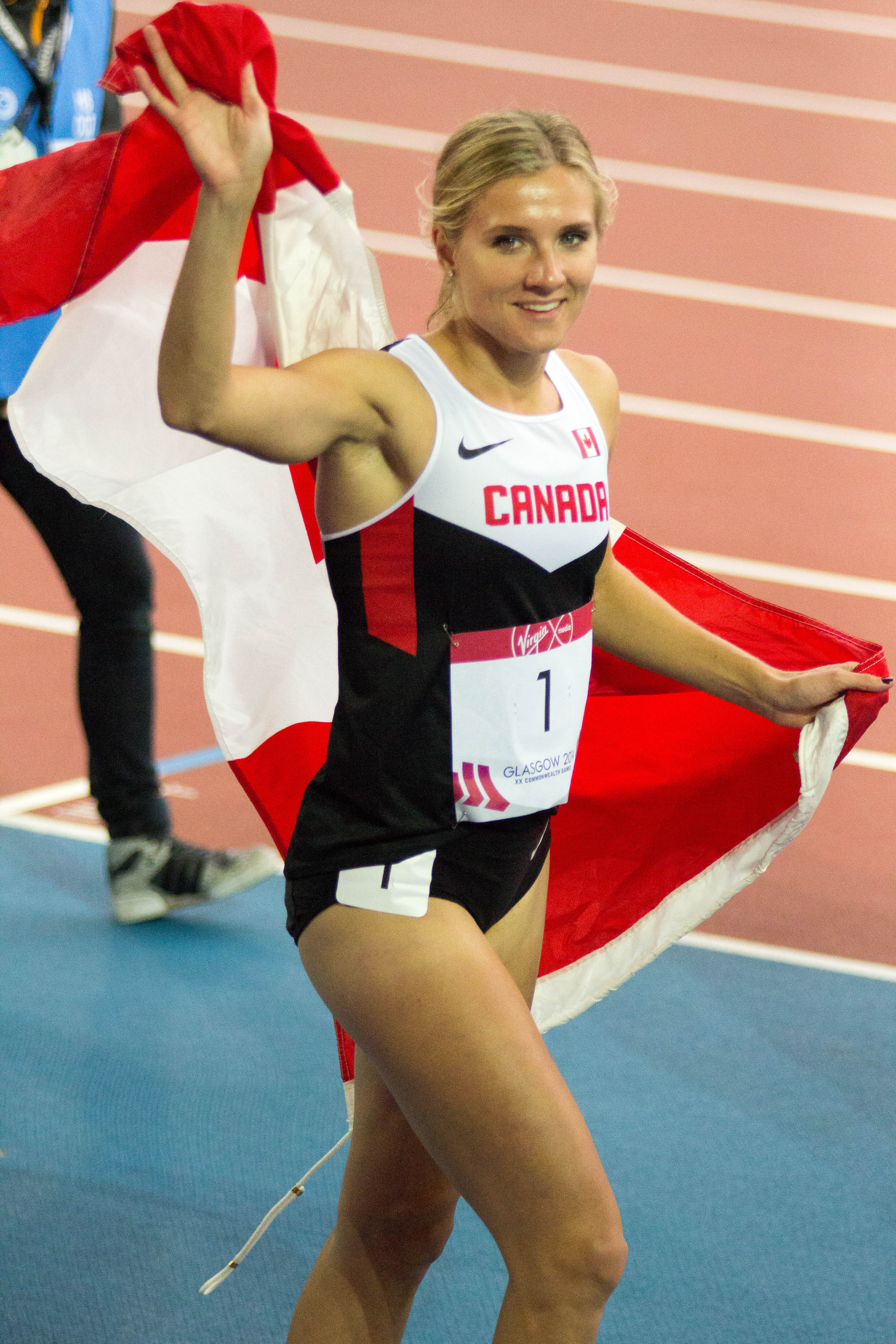
- Theisen-Eaton at the 2014 Commonwealth Games

Personal information
- Nationality: Canadian
- Born: 18 December 1988 (age 37) Saskatoon, Saskatchewan, Canada
- Height: 175 cm (5 ft 9 in)
- Weight: 64 kg (141 lb)

Sport
- Country: Canada
- Sport: Athletics
- Events: Heptathlon, pentathlon

Achievements and titles
- Personal bests: Heptathlon: 6,808 points NR, Götzis, 2015; Pentathlon: 4,881 points NR, Portland, 2016
Medal record
Event	1st	2nd	3rd
Olympic Games	0	0	1
World Championships	0	2	0
World Indoor Championships	1	1	0
Commonwealth Games	1	0	0
Pan American Games	0	0	1
Total	2	3	2
Olympic Games
Bronze medal – third place	2016 Rio de Janeiro	Heptathlon
World Championships
Silver medal – second place	2013 Moscow	Heptathlon
Silver medal – second place	2015 Beijing	Heptathlon
World Indoor Championships
Gold medal – first place	2016 Portland	Pentathlon
Silver medal – second place	2014 Sopot	Pentathlon
Commonwealth Games
Gold medal – first place	2014 Glasgow	Heptathlon
Pan American Games
Bronze medal – third place	2015 Toronto	4×400 m relay

Brianne Theisen-Eaton, née Theisen, (18 December 1988) is a retired Canadian track and field athlete who competed in the heptathlon and women's pentathlon. She won the bronze medal at the 2016 Summer Olympics. Theisen-Eaton holds the Canadian record for the heptathlon with 6,808 points, as well as the indoor pentathlon with a score of 4768 points. Theisen-Eaton is a heptathlon silver medallist from the 2013 World Championships and 2015 World Championships, as well as a pentathlon silver medalist from the 2014 World Indoor Championships. She is the first and only Canadian woman to podium in the multi-events at the World Championships. Theisen-Eaton won Commonwealth Games gold in the heptathlon at Glasgow 2014 and was the 2016 World Indoor Champion in the pentathlon. She also won a bronze medal as part of the women's 4 x 400 m relay at the 2015 Pan American Games in Toronto.

A national junior champion in 2006, she took the heptathlon gold medal at the Pan American Junior Championships the following year. She enrolled at the University of Oregon and broke a number of school records in her first three years, winning back-to-back NCAA heptathlon titles in 2009 and 2010. She also won twice at the NCAA Indoor Championship, including a collegiate pentathlon record in 2011. She and her husband, Ashton Eaton, announced their retirement from track and field on 3 January 2017.

== Career ==
=== Early life ===
Theisen-Eaton was raised in Humboldt, Saskatchewan and attended Humboldt Collegiate Institute. While in high school, she took part in track and field, volleyball, and soccer. She found her niche in the track and field combined events and represented Canada at the 2005 World Youth Championships in Athletics, finishing seventeenth in the girl's heptathlon. She was the national junior champion in the heptathlon in 2006 and took part in the 2006 World Junior Championships in Athletics in Beijing. In her senior year in high school, she won the gold medal at the 2007 Pan American Junior Championships.

=== College ===
Theisen-Eaton received a sports scholarship at the University of Oregon, where she started a major in business administration in late 2007. In her first year, she was the runner-up at the Pac-10 championships and came fourth in the heptathlon at the NCAA Women's Outdoor Track and Field Championship. Theisen began her second year with a third-place finish in the pentathlon at the NCAA Women's Indoor Track and Field Championship. The outdoor season saw her establish herself among the world elite in the heptathlon. She won the Pac-10 title, then set a personal record of 6086 points to win her first NCAA outdoor title, before finally going on to take the national heptathlon title that summer. This earned her a spot on the national team to make her senior international debut at the 2009 World Championships in Athletics. As Canada's only representative in the event, she came in fifteenth place. In addition to her athletic breakthrough, she also received a mention for All-Academic honours that year.

Theisen continued her strong college form into the following year, winning her first pentathlon title at the 2010 NCAA Indoors with 4396 points and repeating as the Pac-10 Outdoor heptathlon champion. She also took a second consecutive victory at the NCAA Outdoors, improving her personal record to 6094 points. This total ranked her within the top twenty athletes in her discipline worldwide that year. At the NCAA Outdoors, she had her second win of the competition when she helped the Oregon women's team to the 4×400-meter relay title. That year, she also led Oregon to a decathlon/heptathlon double at the Texas Relays, as she claimed the win alongside her schoolmate Ashton Eaton to whom she was engaged. They married in July 2013.

In 2011, she won at the NCAA Indoor Championships for a second time and broke Jacquelyn Johnson's collegiate record mark with a total of 4540 points from five events. She suffered an injury in the outdoor season that year and missed ten months as a result. She returned at the Texas A&M Challenge in January 2012 and recorded a score of 4555 points to win the meet. This was a new collegiate and Canadian national record for the event, beating Jill Ross-Giffen's previous score, and Theisen improved her personal bests in the shot put (12.87 m) and high jump (1.88 m) events. A third NCAA Indoor title came two months later with a winning score of 4536 points, which included a 60 m hurdles best of 8.25 seconds. She also repeated as the heptathlon champion and her personal best score of 6440 points included four new bests in individual events (hurdles, shot put, long jump and javelin).

=== Professional ===
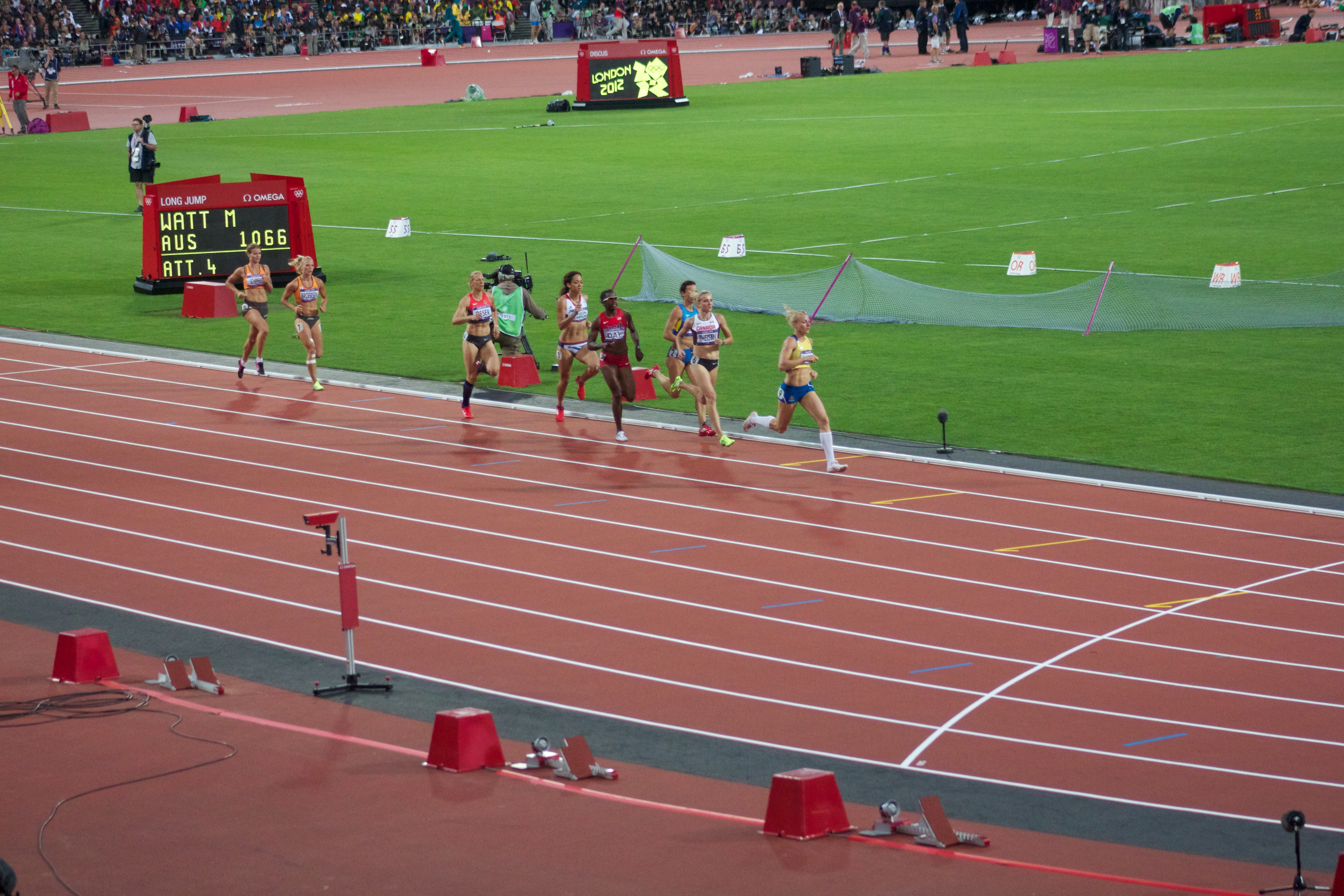
Theisen-Eaton (2nd from the right) competing at the 2012 Summer Olympics in London in the 800 m portion of the heptathlon.

Theisen placed second at the Canadian Track and Field Championships and went on to finish eleventh in the heptathlon at the 2012 London Olympics. A score of 6376 points at the 2013 Hypo Meeting was enough to win the high-profile event ahead of Tatyana Chernova, and she formed a rare Canadian combined events double alongside the men's winner Damian Warner. The 2013 World Championships in Athletics was a wide open event in the heptathlon in that two of the world's best competitors in Chernova and Jessica Ennis-Hill both missed the competition as a result of injuries. Despite putting up a personal best 6,530 points, she had to settle for silver, just 56 points behind eventual World Champion Hanna Melnichenko. After Gotzis, this was the second major competition in a row where the Canadian men and women multi-eventers had a double medal meeting after Warner won bronze at the world championships; however, a double gold for the power couple of Eaton and Eaton-Theisen was narrowly missed. She commented on her achievement saying "I'm at peace getting silver knowing I gave it 110 per cent. Ashton and I talked about both being on the podium here. I watched Ashton the last couple of years winning his medals and could only imagine what that actually felt like." In her last outing that year, she was third at the Decastar meet in France.

At the 2014 World Indoor Championships in Poland, Theisen captured silver in pentathlon with a personal best score of 4768, breaking her own national record. She next competed at the 2014 Commonwealth Games in Glasgow where she went on to win the gold medal in the women's heptathlon event ahead of compatriot Jessica Zelinka. After she said, "So this gold medal makes me really happy. I always said I don't think I would get choked up but I had to fight back a few tears [on the podium]. It's just representing your country and knowing everybody back home is happy and watching and supporting you. It feels really good."

=== 2015 World Championship silver ===
Theisen-Eaton did not compete in the Heptathlon at the 2015 Pan American Games in her home country of Canada. Instead she chose to compete in the long jump event in Toronto. There she finished fourth, just one centimetre off the podium. She also participated in the women's 4 × 400 m relay, this time helping the team to a bronze medal.

She went into the 2015 World Championships in Athletics as the favourite to win, having achieved higher scores than rival Jessica Ennis-Hill since Hill's return from pregnancy. Despite this, Hill won by 115pts with a season's best 6,669. Theisen-Eaton was disappointed with her silver medal saying "I'm disappointed. I went in as the favourite and I didn't compete how I had to to win gold. And that was my own fault. So I am disappointed with it, but there are some lessons that I have learned from it that hopefully I can take into next year...I mean, I scored 250 points less than I already have this year, and had I just done the same thing I had done already previously this year, it would have got me a gold."

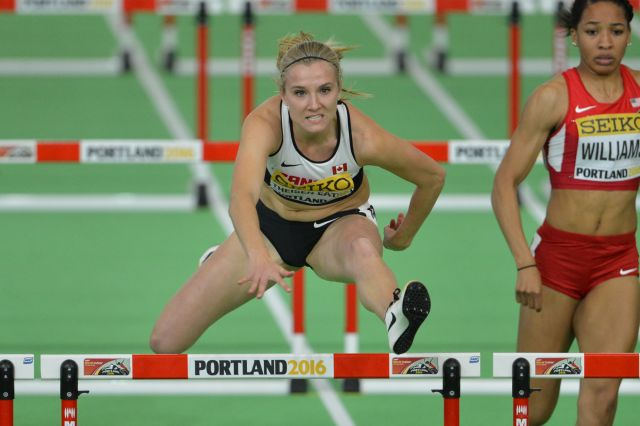
Theisen-Eaton competes in the hurdles event at the 2016 World Indoor Championship in Portland, Oregon.

=== 2016 World Indoor Champion and Olympics ===
The following season Theisen-Eaton followed up her outdoor disappointment with a world title in the indoor pentathlon. She won the title as world champion in the pentathlon, though rival Ennis-Hill was absent. In the process of her win she set a world leading score and North American record for the pentathlon. During the beginning of the outdoor season, at the 2016 Hypomeeting, Theisen-Eaton continued her momentum, winning another event that was again missing Ennis-Hill. Theisen-Eaton finished with a world-leading 6765 points.

Theisen-Eaton competed for Canada in the heptathlon at the 2016 Summer Olympics. After the first day she trailed in sixth place, despite going into the Olympics with the world leading score. During the second day she performed well in the long-jump and javelin events, getting near personal bests which put her into the third-place position going into the final event, the 800 metres. She would finish third in her heat and win the bronze medal scoring 6653 behind winner Nafissatou Thiam, with Jessica Ennis-Hill finishing second. She said of day two that "I'm happy with today, really happy with today. I never would have guessed after that kind of first day I would end up with a medal and actually [my] score wasn't half bad either."

== International competitions ==
Year	Competition	Venue	Position	Event	Notes
Representing Canada
2005	World Youth Championships	Marrakesh, Morocco	17th	Girl's heptathlon	4805 pts
2006	World Junior Championships	Beijing, China	17th	Heptathlon	5149 pts
2007	Pan American Junior Championships	São Paulo, Brazil	1st	Heptathlon	5413 pts
2009	World Championships	Berlin, Germany	15th	Heptathlon	5949 pts
2012	Olympic Games	London, United Kingdom	10th	Heptathlon	6383 pts
2013	World Championships	Moscow, Russia	2nd	Heptathlon	6530 pts
2014	World Indoor Championships	Sopot, Poland	2nd	Pentathlon	4768 pts
2015	World Championships	Beijing, China	2nd	Heptathlon	6554 pts
2016	World Indoor Championships	Portland, United States	1st	Pentathlon	4881 pts
2016	Olympic Games	Rio de Janeiro, Brazil	3rd	Heptathlon	6653 pts

== National titles ==
- Canadian Track and Field Championships
  - Heptathlon: Three time champion
- NCAA Indoor Championships
  - Pentathlon: 2010, 2011, 2012
- NCAA Outdoor Championships
  - Heptathlon: 2009, 2010, 2012)
  - 4 × 400 m relay: 2010

== Personal bests ==
Heptathlon
Event	Performance	Place	Date
100 metres hurdles	12.93	Götzis	28 May 2016
High jump	1.89 m	Götzis	30 May 2015
Shot put	13.99 m	Portland	30 July 2015
200 metres	23.33	Götzis	28 May 2016
Long jump	6.72 m	Götzis	31 May 2015
Javelin throw	47.36 m	Rio de Janeiro	13 August 2016
800 metres	2:09.03	Moscow	13 August 2013
Heptathlon	6808 pts NR	Götzis	31 May 2015

Indoor Pentathlon
Event	Performance	Place	Date
60 metres hurdles	8.04	Portland	18 March 2016
High jump	1.88 m	College Station	27 January 2012
Shot put	13.86 m	Sopot	7 March 2014
Long jump	6.42 m	Portland	18 March 2016
800 metres	2:09.99	Portland	18 March 2016
Pentathlon	4881 pts NR	Portland	18 March 2016

== Personal life ==
She married American decathlete Ashton Eaton in July 2013. The pair met while competing together at the University of Oregon. The two of them starred in a Visa Inc. advertisement that aired during the 2016 Summer Olympics, which poked fun at their romance despite representing different countries. They have two children.

== See also ==
- List of Canadian records in athletics
