= Athletics at the 2013 Summer Universiade – Women's heptathlon =

The women's heptathlon event at the 2013 Summer Universiade was held on 10–11 July.

== Medalists ==
Gold	Silver	Bronze
Laura Ikauniece; Latvia	Györgyi Zsivoczky-Farkas; Hungary	Eliška Klučinová; Czech Republic

== Results ==
=== 100 metres hurdles ===
Wind:
Heat 1: +1.8 m/s, Heat 2: +0.8 m/s, Heat 3: +1.6 m/s

Rank	Heat	Name	Nationality	Time	Points	Notes
~~1~~	2	Tatyana Chernova	Russia	~~13.63~~	~~1031~~	DQ
1	3	Laura Ikauniece	Latvia	13.85	1000	
2	3	Lene Myrmel	Norway	13.87	997	
3	1	Györgyi Zsivoczky-Farkas	Hungary	13.97	983	
3	3	Kristina Savitskaya	Russia	13.97	983	
5	2	Eliška Klučinová	Czech Republic	14.12	961	
6	3	Mari Klaup	Estonia	14.21	949	
7	1	Rachael McIntosh	Canada	14.29	938	
8	2	Ida Marcussen	Norway	14.30	936	
9	1	Jeong Yeon-jin	South Korea	14.33	932	
10	2	Laura Ginés	Spain	14.58	898	
11	1	Ana María Porras	Costa Rica	14.74	876	
12	3	Sophie Stanwell	Australia	14.78	871	
13	1	Judit Nagy	Romania	14.87	859	
14	2	Bianca Erwee	South Africa	14.94	850	
15	2	Dee-Ann Rogers	Anguilla	14.97	846	
16	2	Corlia Kruger	Namibia	15.81	738	
17	3	Kateřina Cachová	Czech Republic	17.11	584	
18	1	Razia Razia	Pakistan	18.98	392	

=== High jump ===
Rank	Group	Athlete	Nationality	1.29	1.32	1.50	1.53	1.56	1.59	1.62	1.65	1.68	1.71	1.74	1.77	1.80	1.83	1.86	1.89	Result	Points	Notes	Total
1	A	Eliška Klučinová	Czech Republic	–	–	–	–	–	–	–	–	o	o	o	o	o	xo	xxo	xxx	1.86	1054		2015
~~1~~	B	Tatyana Chernova	Russia	–	–	–	–	–	–	–	–	–	o	o	o	xo	o	xxo	xxx	~~1.86~~	~~1054~~	DQ	~~2085~~
2	B	Kateřina Cachová	Czech Republic	–	–	–	–	–	–	–	o	–	o	o	o	xo	o	xxx		1.83	1016		1600
3	B	Györgyi Zsivoczky-Farkas	Hungary	–	–	–	–	–	–	–	o	–	o	o	o	xo	xxo	xxx		1.83	1016		1999
4	A	Laura Ikauniece	Latvia	–	–	–	–	–	–	–	–	o	o	o	o	o	xxx			1.80	978		1978
5	A	Mari Klaup	Estonia	–	–	–	–	–	–	–	–	o	o	xo	o	xxo	xxx			1.80	978		1927
6	A	Kristina Savitskaya	Russia	–	–	–	–	–	–	–	–	o	xo	o	o	xxx				1.77	941		1924
7	B	Bianca Erwee	South Africa	–	–	–	–	–	–	o	o	o	o	o	xxx					1.74	903		1753
8	A	Laura Ginés	Spain	–	–	–	–	o	o	o	o	o	o	xxx						1.71	867		1765
9	B	Ida Marcussen	Norway	–	–	–	–	–	–	o	o	xo	xo	xxx						1.71	867		1803
10	A	Sophie Stanwell	Australia	–	–	–	–	–	–	o	o	xo	xxx							1.68	830		1701
11	A	Rachael McIntosh	Canada	–	–	–	–	–	–	o	o	xxxx								1.65	795		1733
12	B	Judit Nagy	Romania	–	–	–	–	o	–	xo	o	xxxx								1.65	795		1654
13	A	Lene Myrmel	Norway	–	–	–	o	o	o	xxo	xo	xxxx								1.65	795		1792
14	A	Jeong Yeon-jin	South Korea	–	o	–	o	xo	o	xo	xxo	xxx								1.65	795		1727
15	B	Corlia Kruger	Namibia	–	–	o	o	o	–	o	xxx									1.62	759		1497
16	B	Dee-Ann Rogers	Anguilla	–	–	–	o	o	xxo	o	xxx									1.62	759		1605
17	B	Ana María Porras	Costa Rica	–	–	o	o	o	o	xxx										1.59	724		1600
18	A	Razia Razia	Pakistan	o	xxx															1.29	399		791

=== Shot put ===
Rank	Group	Athlete	Nationality	#1	#2	#3	Result	Points	Notes	Total
1	B	Kristina Savitskaya	Russia	13.10	12.65	14.42	14.42	822		2746
~~2~~	A	Tatyana Chernova	Russia	~~13.46~~	~~13.40~~	~~13.92~~	~~13.92~~	~~789~~	DQ	~~2874~~
2	B	Laura Ginés	Spain	x	13.74	x	13.74	777		2542
3	A	Györgyi Zsivoczky-Farkas	Hungary	12.78	13.51	13.60	13.60	767		2766
4	B	Eliška Klučinová	Czech Republic	13.40	13.39	13.57	13.57	765		2780
5	A	Ida Marcussen	Norway	12.82	13.28	13.22	13.28	746		2549
6	B	Laura Ikauniece	Latvia	12.88	11.91	11.90	12.88	719		2697
7	A	Judit Nagy	Romania	12.50	12.02	12.22	12.50	694		2348
8	B	Rachael McIntosh	Canada	11.65	11.96	12.38	12.38	686		2419
9	B	Mari Klaup	Estonia	12.29	x	11.84	12.29	680		2607
10	B	Sophie Stanwell	Australia	10.73	11.03	10.96	11.03	597		2298
11	A	Bianca Erwee	South Africa	10.96	10.49	10.36	10.96	592		2345
12	A	Kateřina Cachová	Czech Republic	10.71	10.16	10.12	10.71	576		2176
13	B	Lene Myrmel	Norway	10.66	10.30	9.80	10.66	573		2365
14	A	Ana María Porras	Costa Rica	x	10.61	7.30	10.61	569		2169
15	B	Jeong Yeon-jin	South Korea	9.33	8.61	9.17	9.33	486		2213
16	A	Corlia Kruger	Namibia	x	x	8.89	8.89	457		1954
17	A	Dee-Ann Rogers	Anguilla	7.81	8.83	6.70	8.83	388		1993
18	B	Razia Razia	Pakistan	6.96	7.18	6.98	7.18	347		1138

=== 200 metres ===
Wind:
Heat 1: +0.8 m/s, Heat 2: -0.2 m/s, Heat 3: +2.7 m/s

Rank	Heat	Name	Nationality	Time	Points	Notes	Total
1	1	Sophie Stanwell	Australia	23.90	990		3288
~~2~~	2	Tatyana Chernova	Russia	~~23.93~~	~~987~~	DQ	~~3861~~
2	1	Laura Ikauniece	Latvia	24.08	973		3670
3	1	Kateřina Cachová	Czech Republic	24.61	923		3099
4	3	Eliška Klučinová	Czech Republic	24.71	914		3694
5	3	Ida Marcussen	Norway	24.98	889		3438
6	3	Kristina Savitskaya	Russia	25.12	876		3622
7	1	Györgyi Zsivoczky-Farkas	Hungary	25.43	848		3614
8	2	Laura Ginés	Spain	25.44	847		3389
9	2	Rachael McIntosh	Canada	25.58	834		3253
10	3	Judit Nagy	Romania	25.71	823		3171
11	1	Mari Klaup	Estonia	25.74	820		3427
12	3	Bianca Erwee	South Africa	25.75	819		3164
13	2	Dee-Ann Rogers	Anguilla	25.91	805		2798
14	2	Lene Myrmel	Norway	25.94	802		3167
15	1	Ana María Porras	Costa Rica	26.42	761		2930
16	3	Jeong Yeon-jin	South Korea	26.72	735		2948
17	3	Corlia Kruger	Namibia	27.13	701		2655
18	2	Razia Razia	Pakistan	29.25	536		1674

=== Long jump ===
Rank	Group	Athlete	Nationality	#1	#2	#3	Result	Points	Notes	Total
~~1~~	B	Tatyana Chernova	Russia	~~6.31~~	~~6.48~~	~~x~~	~~6.48~~	~~1001~~	DQ	~~4862~~
1	B	Györgyi Zsivoczky-Farkas	Hungary	6.32	5.97	x	6.32	949		4563
2	A	Laura Ikauniece	Latvia	6.11w	6.09	6.20	6.20	912		4582
3	A	Kristina Savitskaya	Russia	5.77	6.00w	6.19	6.19	908		4530
4	A	Sophie Stanwell	Australia	5.86	6.03	x	6.03	859		4147
5	B	Ida Marcussen	Norway	6.00	5.69	5.99	6.00	850		4288
6	A	Eliška Klučinová	Czech Republic	5.97w	5.85w	5.95w	5.97w	840		4534
7	A	Mari Klaup	Estonia	x	5.73	x	5.73	768		4195
8	B	Bianca Erwee	South Africa	5.69	5.52	5.72	5.72	765		3929
9	A	Rachael McIntosh	Canada	5.67	5.66	5.69	5.69	756		4009
10	B	Dee-Ann Rogers	Anguilla	5.52	5.17	x	5.52	706		3504
11	A	Lene Myrmel	Norway	5.52	x	x	5.52	706		3873
12	A	Jeong Yeon-jin	South Korea	5.49	x	5.49w	5.49	697		3645
13	B	Ana María Porras	Costa Rica	5.44	5.31	5.41	5.44	683		3613
14	A	Laura Ginés	Spain	5.19	5.22	5.33	5.33	651		4040
15	B	Corlia Kruger	Namibia	5.03	4.94	x	5.03	567		3222
16	A	Razia Razia	Pakistan	4.13w	4.27	4.10	4.27	371		2045
	B	Kateřina Cachová	Czech Republic				DNS	0		DNF
	B	Judit Nagy	Romania				DNS	0		DNF

=== Javelin throw ===
Rank	Group	Athlete	Nationality	#1	#2	#3	Result	Points	Notes	Total
1	B	Mari Klaup	Estonia	47.68	50.14	49.27	50.14	863		5058
2	B	Ida Marcussen	Norway	43.92	49.63	45.22	49.63	853		5141
3	B	Györgyi Zsivoczky-Farkas	Hungary	46.69	49.23	46.43	49.23	845		5408
4	B	Laura Ikauniece	Latvia	48.67	46.33	46.58	48.67	834		5416
~~5~~	B	Tatyana Chernova	Russia	~~47.90~~	~~x~~	~~x~~	~~47.90~~	~~819~~	DQ	~~5681~~
5	B	Kristina Savitskaya	Russia	43.36	41.21	41.30	43.36	732		5262
6	B	Eliška Klučinová	Czech Republic	43.33	39.40	43.16	43.33	731		5265
7	A	Rachael McIntosh	Canada	32.42	37.29	39.69	39.69	661		4670
8	A	Bianca Erwee	South Africa	39.44	38.33	34.82	39.44	657		4586
9	B	Laura Ginés	Spain	36.62	38.36	35.38	38.36	636		4676
10	A	Lene Myrmel	Norway	34.43	31.45	35.37	35.37	579		4452
11	B	Sophie Stanwell	Australia	31.87	32.09	28.87	32.09	516		4663
12	A	Jeong Yeon-jin	South Korea	x	x	31.30	31.30	501		4146
13	A	Corlia Kruger	Namibia	24.24	x	x	24.24	368		3590
14	A	Ana María Porras	Costa Rica	24.09	x	x	24.09	365		3978
15	A	Razia Razia	Pakistan	17.63	23.98	x	23.98	363		2408
16	A	Dee-Ann Rogers	Anguilla	21.18	x	x	21.18	311		3815

=== 800 metres ===
Rank	Heat	Name	Nationality	Time	Points	Notes
~~1~~	2	Tatyana Chernova	Russia	~~2:11.58~~	~~942~~	DQ
1	2	Ida Marcussen	Norway	2:12.70	925	
2	2	Rachael McIntosh	Canada	2:13.18	919	
3	2	Laura Ikauniece	Latvia	2:14.10	905	
4	2	Györgyi Zsivoczky-Farkas	Hungary	2:17.26	861	
5	1	Lene Myrmel	Norway	2:17.29	861	
6	2	Eliška Klučinová	Czech Republic	2:17.40	859	
7	1	Sophie Stanwell	Australia	2:17.70	855	
8	2	Kristina Savitskaya	Russia	2:19.26	834	
9	1	Bianca Erwee	South Africa	2:22.87	785	
10	2	Laura Ginés	Spain	2:23.03	783	
11	2	Mari Klaup	Estonia	2:23.31	779	
12	1	Ana María Porras	Costa Rica	2:24.40	765	
13	1	Jeong Yeon-jin	South Korea	2:25.82	746	
14	1	Corlia Kruger	Namibia	2:33.02	656	
15	1	Dee-Ann Rogers	Anguilla	2:33.52	649	
16	1	Razia Razia	Pakistan	3:01.84	348	

=== Final standings ===
The highest mark recorded in each event is highlighted in yellow

Rank	Athlete	Nationality	100m H	HJ	SP	200m	LJ	JT	800m	Points	Notes
~~1~~	Tatyana Chernova	Russia	~~13.63~~	~~1.86~~	~~13.92~~	~~23.93~~	~~6.48~~	~~47.90~~	~~2:11.58~~	~~6623~~	DQ
1st place, gold medalist(s)	Laura Ikauniece	Latvia	13.85	1.80	12.88	24.08	6.20	48.67	2:14.10	6321	
2nd place, silver medalist(s)	Györgyi Zsivoczky-Farkas	Hungary	13.97	1.83	13.60	25.43	6.32	49.23	2:17.26	6269	
3rd place, bronze medalist(s)	Eliška Klučinová	Czech Republic	14.12	1.86	13.57	24.71w	5.97w	43.33	2:17.40	6124	
4	Kristina Savitskaya	Russia	13.97	1.77	14.42	25.12w	6.19	43.36	2:19.26	6096	
5	Ida Marcussen	Norway	14.30	1.71	13.28	24.98w	6.00	49.63	2:12.70	6066	
6	Mari Klaup	Estonia	14.21	1.80	12.29	25.74	5.73	50.14	2:23.31	5837	
7	Rachael McIntosh	Canada	14.29	1.65	12.38	25.58	5.69	39.69	2:13.18	5589	
8	Sophie Stanwell	Australia	14.78	1.68	11.03	23.90	6.03	32.09	2:17.70	5518	
9	Laura Ginés	Spain	14.58	1.71	13.74	25.44	5.33	38.36	2:23.03	5459	
10	Bianca Erwee	South Africa	14.94	1.74	10.96	25.75w	5.72	39.44	2:22.87	5371	
11	Lene Myrmel	Norway	13.87	1.65	10.66	25.94	5.52	35.37	2:17.29	5313	
12	Jeong Yeon-jin	South Korea	14.33	1.65	9.33	26.72w	5.49	31.30	2:25.82	4892	
13	Ana María Porras	Costa Rica	14.74	1.59	10.61	26.42	5.44	24.09	2:24.40	4743	
14	Dee-Ann Rogers	Anguilla	14.97	1.62	7.83	25.91	5.52	21.18	2:33.52	4464	
15	Corlia Kruger	Namibia	15.81	1.62	8.89	27.13w	5.03	24.24	2:33.02	4246	
16	Razia Razia	Pakistan	18.98	1.29	7.18	29.25	4.27	23.98	3:01.84	2756	
	Judit Nagy	Romania	14.87	1.65	12.50	25.71w	DNS	–	–	DNF	
	Kateřina Cachová	Czech Republic	17.11	1.83	10.71	24.61	DNS	–	–	DNF	
