= Sofia Yfantidou =

Greek athlete (born 1985)

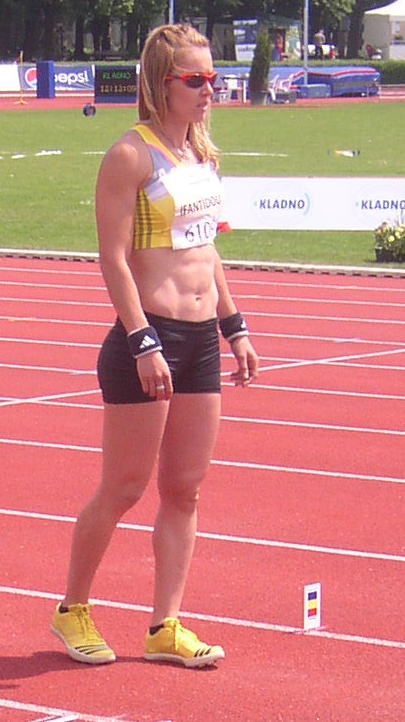
- Sofia Yfantidou at the 2013 TNT Express Meeting in Kladno

Personal information
- Born: January 10, 1985 (age 41) Veria, Greece
- Height: 1.62 m (5 ft 4 in)
- Weight: 54 kg (119 lb)

Sport
- Country: Greece
- Sport: Athletics
- Event(s): Heptathlon, Pentathlon

Achievements and titles
- Personal best(s): 6,113points 4,338 points
Medal record
Mediterranean Games
Silver medal – second place	Mersin 2013	Heptathlon
- Updated on 8 June 2015

Sofia Yfantidou (Greek: Σοφία Υφαντίδου; also transcribed in English Ifadidou; born 10 January 1985) is a Greek track and field athlete. She competed at the 2012 Summer Olympics in the women's heptathlon event. She finished 24th, with 5947 points, achieving an Olympic record (OHB) at the heptathlon event of javelin throw with 56.96 metres.

== Competition record ==
Year	Competition	Venue	Position	Event	Notes
Representing Greece
2007	European U23 Championships	Debrecen, Hungary	7th	Javelin	52.25 m
2009	Universiade	Belgrade, Serbia	6th	Heptathlon	5737
2010	European Championships	Barcelona, Spain	15th	Heptathlon	6004 PB
2012	European Championships	Helsinki, Finland	—	Heptathlon	DNF
2012	Olympic Games	London, United Kingdom	24th	Heptathlon	5947
2013	Mediterranean Games	Mersin, Turkey	2nd	Heptathlon	5752 pts
2013	World Championships	Moscow, Russia	23rd	Heptathlon	5894 SB
2015	World Championships	Beijing, China	19th	Heptathlon	5951 pts
2016	European Championships	Amsterdam, Netherlands	8th	Heptathlon	6025 pts SB
2016	Olympic Games	Rio de Janeiro, Brazil	27th	Heptathlon	5613 pts
2018	European Championships	Berlin, Germany	22nd (q)	Javelin	52.26 m

== Personal bests ==
- Heptathlon: 6,113 pts (2015)
- 200 metres: 25.30 sec
- 800 metres: 2:16.75 sec
- 100 m hurdles: 13.54 sec
- High jump: 1.72 m
- Long jump: 6.14 m
- Shot put: 13.65 m (2015)
- Javelin throw: 59.29 m* (2017)

(*) Fourth among Greek javelin throwers, behind Mirela Maniani, Aggeliki Tsiolakoudi & Savva Lika.
