= 2000 Oceania Youth Athletics Championships =

V Oceania Youth Athletics Championships
- Dates: August 24–26
- Host city: Adelaide, South Australia, Australia
- Venue: Santos Stadium
- Level: Youth
- Events: 33 (17 boys, 16 girls)
- Participation: 97 (51 boys, 46 girls) athletes from 18 nations

The 2000 Oceania Youth Athletics Championships were held at the Santos Stadium in Adelaide, Australia, between August 24–26, 2000. They were held together with the 2000 Oceania Open Championships. A total of 33 events were contested, 17 by boys and 16 by girls.

== Medal summary ==
Medal winners can be found on the Athletics Weekly website. Complete results can be found on the webpages of the World Junior Athletics History, and the Cool Running New Zealand newsgroup.

=== Boys under 18 (Youth) ===
Event	Gold		Silver		Bronze	
100 metres (wind: 3.7m/s)	Teina Teiti (COK)	11.01 w	Albert Thomas (AUS)	11.23 w	Eddie Matthies (PNG)	11.31 w
200 metres (wind: 0.5m/s)	Teina Teiti (COK)	22.63	Albert Thomas (AUS)	22.70	Nathan Morath (NZL)	22.92
400 metres	Nathan Morath (NZL)	50.58	Dominique Bouillant (NCL)	52.15	(French Polynesia) /Roger Lau Fat (TAH)	53.25
800 metres	Michael Stringer (NZL)	1:58.34	Setefano Mika (SAM)	2:01.14	Linton Mani Oeta (SOL)	2:01.55
1500 metres	Setefano Mika (SAM)	4:20.93	Henry Foufaka (SOL)	4:23.79	Satini Tyrell (SAM)	4:23.83
3000 metres	Henry Foufaka (SOL)	9:20.79	Bongi Maki (PNG)	10:09.11	Keith Sepety (FSM)	10:17.75
2000 metres steeplechase	Henry Foufaka (SOL)	6:41.89				
110 metres hurdles (wind: 2.7m/s)	Matt Stratton (NZL)	14.54 w	(French Polynesia) /Matorai Dehors (TAH)	16.89 w	Satini Tyrell (SAM)	17.23 w
400 metres hurdles	Matt Stratton (NZL)	57.81	Darrell Bradford (GUM)	58.75	(French Polynesia) /Roger Lau Fat (TAH)	1:00.54
High jump	Glen Petersen (AUS)	2.01	Antonio Mohamed (FIJ); Daniel Sandol (PNG)	1.95		
Pole vault	Warren Tavergeux (NCL)	4.00	Dominique Bouillant (NCL)	3.20		
Long jump	Eroni Tuivanuavou (FIJ)	7.06 (wind: 1.1m/s)	Glen Petersen (AUS)	6.90 (wind: 1.8m/s)	Albert Thomas (AUS)	6.80 (wind: 1.7m/s)
Triple jump	Simon Benari (PNG)	12.70 (wind: 0.7m/s)	Taia Maerennang (KIR)	12.56 (wind: -0.5m/s)	Alfred Reiher (KIR)	12.17 w (wind: 2.4m/s)
Shot put	David McGrath (NZL)	15.49	Sam Hanzel (AUS)	15.31	Rangi Ivaiti (COK)	14.87
Hammer throw	Sam Hanzel (AUS)	42.71	Fereti Leavasa (SAM)	27.97		
Javelin throw	Jarrod Bannister (AUS)	66.15	Dale Morris (AUS)	51.88	Rangi Ivaiti (COK)	51.09
800 metres Medley relay (100m x 100m x 200m x 400m)	New Zealand	1:40.97	Australia	1:42.16	Papua New Guinea	1:44.23

=== Girls under 18 (Youth) ===
Event	Gold		Silver		Bronze	
100 metres (wind: 3.3m/s)	Rebecca James (AUS)	12.31 w	Erica Prescott (NZL)	12.66 w	Lynette Bureng (PNG)	12.74 w
200 metres (wind: 0.8m/s)	Kate Johnstone (NZL)	25.62	Rebecca James (AUS)	25.89	Anna Spriggens (NZL)	26.47
400 metres	Kate Johnstone (NZL)	57.49	Anna Spriggens (NZL)	59.05	Jodie Parravicini (AUS)	59.87
800 metres	Melanie Aldridge (AUS)	2:23.63	Miriam Goiye (PNG)	2:28.97		
1500 metres	Rowan Baird (AUS)	4:46.36	Riana Dinsmore (AUS)	4:50.42	Miriam Goiye (PNG)	5:15.28
3000 metres	Jacqui Falconer (NZL)	10:10.65	Rowan Baird (AUS)	10:10.81	Riana Dinsmore (AUS)	10:32.22
100 metres hurdles (wind: 1.7m/s)	Sarah Cowley (NZL)	15.01	(French Polynesia) /Vairea Burns (TAH)	16.03	(French Polynesia) /Temoemoe Faremiro (TAH)	16.58
High jump	Sarah Cowley (NZL)	1.71	Rebecca James (AUS)	1.66	(French Polynesia) /Vaimiti Chonsui (TAH)	1.50
Pole vault	Nikki Beckett (NZL)	3.40	(French Polynesia) /Temoemoe Faremiro (TAH)	2.52	(French Polynesia) /Lucie Tepea (TAH)	2.02
Long jump	Kate Malcolm (NZL)	5.33 (wind: 0.4m/s)	Melesia Mafile'o (TGA)	5.26 (wind: 0.9m/s)	(French Polynesia) /Temoemoe Faremiro (TAH)	5.18 (wind: 0.6m/s)
Triple jump	Kate Malcolm (NZL)	11.09 (wind: 0.3m/s)	Melesia Mafile'o (TGA)	10.87 (wind: 0.3m/s)	(French Polynesia) /Vairea Burns (TAH)	10.44 (wind: 0.9m/s)
Shot put	Tereapii Tapoki (COK)	12.57	Adituivuna Cula (FIJ)	11.88	Clara Planas (NMI)	8.45
Discus throw	Tereapii Tapoki (COK)	38.23	Clara Planas (NMI)	17.43		
Hammer throw	Clara Planas (NMI)	21.44				
Javelin throw	Tracey Hawken (AUS)	35.33	Melesia Mafile'o (TGA)	33.09	Illyana Tauarea (COK)	31.46
800 metres Medley relay (100m x 100m x 200m x 400m)	New Zealand	1:49.46	Australia	1:55.39	Papua New Guinea	1:55.83

== Medal table (unofficial) ==
* Host nation (Australia)

Rank	Nation	Gold	Silver	Bronze	Total
1	New Zealand (NZL)	15	2	2	19
2	Australia (AUS)*	7	11	3	21
3	Cook Islands (COK)	4	0	3	7
4	Solomon Islands (SOL)	2	1	1	4
5	Papua New Guinea (PNG)	1	3	5	9
6	Samoa (SAM)	1	2	2	5
7	Fiji (FIJ)	1	2	0	3
7	New Caledonia (NCL)	1	2	0	3
9	Northern Mariana Islands (NMI)	1	1	1	3
10	French Polynesia (TAH)	0	3	7	10
11	Tonga (TON)	0	3	0	3
12	Kiribati (KIR)	0	1	1	2
13	Guam (GUM)	0	1	0	1
14	Federated States of Micronesia (FSM)	0	0	1	1
Totals (14 entries)		33	32	26	91

== Participation (unofficial) ==
An unofficial count yields the number of about 97 athletes from 18 countries:

- American Samoa (4)
- Australia (14)
- Cook Islands (8)
- Fiji (6)
- Guam (1)
- Kiribati (4)
- Marshall Islands (3)
- Federated States of Micronesia (6)
- Nauru (8)
- New Caledonia (3)
- New Zealand (11)
- Northern Mariana Islands (3)
- Palau (1)
- Papua New Guinea (9)
- Samoa (6)
- Solomon Islands (2)
- (French Polynesia) /Tahiti (7)
- Tonga (1)
