= Athletics at the 2012 Summer Olympics – Women's heptathlon =

Women's heptathlon at the Games of the XXX Olympiad
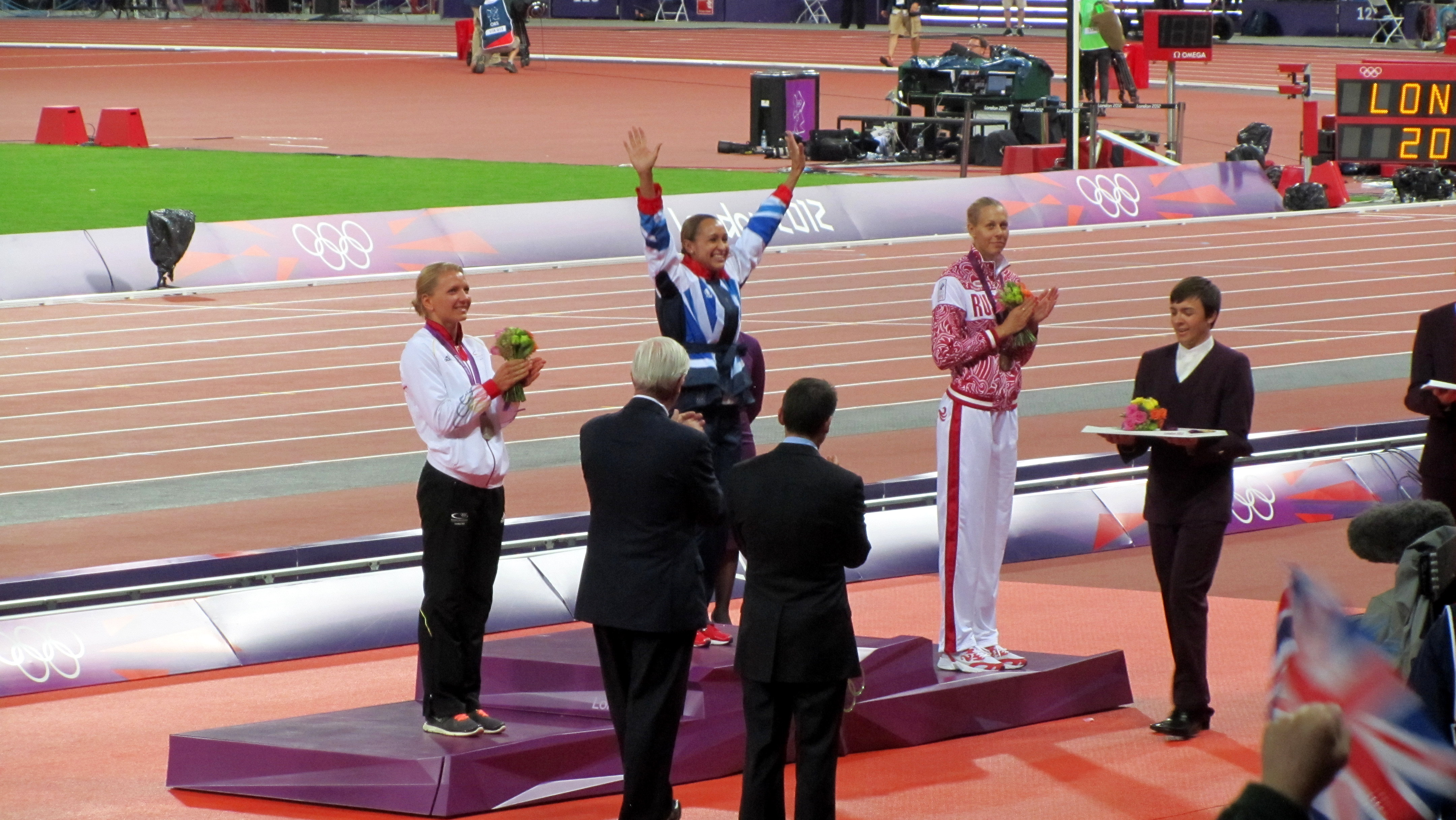
- Podium
- Venue: Olympic Stadium
- Date: 3–4 August
- Competitors: 39 from 25 nations
- Winning points: 6955

Medalists
| 1st place, gold medalist(s) | | Jessica Ennis | Great Britain |
| 2nd place, silver medalist(s) | | Lilli Schwarzkopf | Germany |
| 3rd place, bronze medalist(s) | | Austra Skujytė | Lithuania |

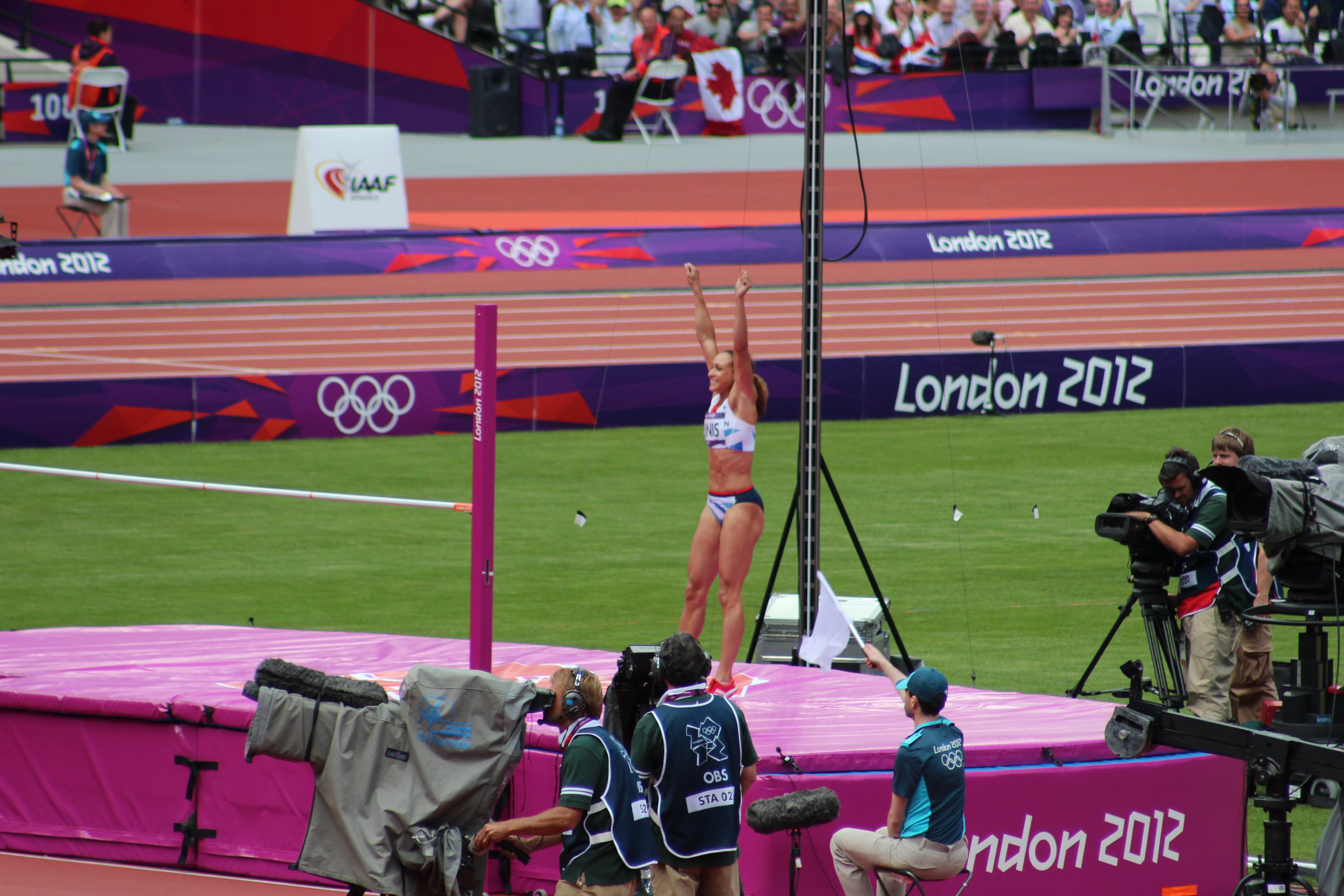
Winner Jessica Ennis

Official Video 800 Highlights, Interviews full 100 metres hurdles Day 1 Highlights full 200m Long Jump and Javelin Highlights full 800m

The Women's heptathlon competition at the 2012 Summer Olympics in London, United Kingdom. The event was held at the Olympic Stadium on 3–4 August.

The gold medal was won by Jessica Ennis. She bettered Eunice Barber's World Heptathlon Best in the 100 metres hurdles by 0.08 seconds. Many others in the field also achieved their personal bests in the same event.

2004 silver medalist Austra Skujytė outperformed Ennis by 6 cm in the high jump, clearing 1.92m, and in the shot put, where both athletes scored personal bests.

In the 200 metres, Ennis regained the lead, tying with Dafne Schippers at 22.83 seconds, a personal best for both. Ennis ended this first day with a lead of 175 points.

On the second day, Ennis initially struggled with the long jump but figured out her marks eventually posting a respectable 6.48m. Reigning World Champion Tatyana Chernova had the best mark in the event with 6.54m. Sofia Ifadidou came first in the javelin, setting a new Olympic best of 56.96m while Ennis was over 7 metres behind. Ennis went into the 800 metres with almost a 200-point lead over the slower Skujytė. Confident of a win, she led the race, completing her opening lap in 1:01.89. She paid for that fast pace, being overtaken by Lilli Schwarzkopf and Chernova who were battling over the silver medal but on the home stretch, Ennis again showed her superiority, passing them both to win in 2:08.65. Chernova won the battle but could not make up the 35-point differential, so Schwarzkopf took silver and Chernova the bronze. Initially after the 800 metres, Schwarzkopf was disqualified for breaking lane, but this later turned out to be a mistake, Kristina Savitskaya in the neighbouring lane having done so, and Schwarzkopf was re-instated.

Ennis's final score was 6955 points, a British and Commonwealth record.

In 2013, Chernova was suspended over doping violations back to 2009. Subsequently, the IAAF filed a case with the Court of Arbitration questioning the selective suspension periods of her and five other Russian athletes that made them eligible between 2011 and 2013.

== Competition format ==
The heptathlon consists of seven track and field events, with a points system that awards higher scores for better results in each of the seven events. The seven event scores are summed to give a total for the heptathlon.

== Records ==
Prior to the competition, the existing World and Olympic records were as follows.

| World record | Jackie Joyner-Kersee (USA) | 7291 pts | Seoul, South Korea | 23–24 September 1988 |
| Olympic record | Jackie Joyner-Kersee (USA) | 7291 pts | Seoul, South Korea | 23–24 September 1988 |
| 2012 World leading | Jessica Ennis (GBR) | 6906 pts | Götzis, Austria | 26–27 May 2012 |
Broken records during the 2012 Summer Olympics
| 2012 World leading | Jessica Ennis (GBR) | 6955 pts | London, United Kingdom | 3–4 August 2012 |
| World Heptathlon Best; 100m hurdles | Jessica Ennis (GBR) | 12.54 NR, WHB | London, United Kingdom | 3 August 2012 |
| World Heptathlon Best; Shot put | Austra Skujytė (LTU) | 17.31 WHB | London, United Kingdom | 3 August 2012 |
| Olympic Heptathlon Best; Javelin throw | Sofia Ifadidou (GRE) | 56.96 OHB | London, United Kingdom | 4 August 2012 |

== Schedule ==
All times are British Summer Time (UTC+1)

| Date | Time | Round |
|---|---|---|
| Friday, 3 August 2012 | 10:05; 11:15; 19:00; 20:45 | 100 metres hurdles High jump Shot put 200 metres |
| Saturday, 4 August 2012 | 10:05; 11:40; 20:35 | Long jump Javelin throw 800 metres |

== Detailed results ==
| KEY: | WHB | World Heptathlon Best | OHB | Olympic Heptathlon Best | NR | National Record | PB | Personal Best | SB | Seasonal Best | DQ | Disqualified | DNS | Did not start | DNF | Did not finish |

=== 100 metres hurdles ===
Wind: +0.7, −0.2, +2.0, +0.9, +1.3 m/s.

| Rank | Heat | Athlete | Nationality | Result | Points | Notes |
|---|---|---|---|---|---|---|
| 1 | 5 | Jessica Ennis | Great Britain | 12.54 | 1195 | WHB, NR |
| 2 | 5 | Jessica Zelinka | Canada | 12.65 | 1178 | PB |
| 3 | 5 | Hyleas Fountain | United States | 12.70 | 1170 | PB |
| 4 | 5 | Sara Aerts | Belgium | 12.94 | 1133 | PB |
| 5 | 5 | Antoinette Nana Djimou Ida | France | 12.96 | 1130 | PB |
| 6 | 1 | Karolina Tymińska | Poland | 13.22 | 1091 | |
| 7 | 4 | Lyudmyla Yosypenko | Ukraine | 13.25 | 1087 | PB |
| 8 | 4 | Lilli Schwarzkopf | Germany | 13.26 | 1086 | |
| 9 | 5 | Brianne Theisen | Canada | 13.30 | 1080 | |
| 10 | 3 | Hanna Melnychenko | Ukraine | 13.32 | 1077 | SB |
| 11 | 3 | Ellen Sprunger | Switzerland | 13.35 | 1072 | PB |
| 12 | 4 | Kristina Savitskaya | Russia | 13.37 | 1069 | PB |
| 13 | 3 | Jennifer Oeser | Germany | 13.42 | 1062 | SB |
| 14 | 5 | Uhunoma Osazuwa | Nigeria | 13.46 | 1056 | |
| 15 | 5 | Tatyana Chernova | Russia | 13.48 | 1053 | |
| 16 | 3 | Louise Hazel | Great Britain | 13.48 | 1053 | SB |
| 17 | 4 | Dafne Schippers | Netherlands | 13.48 | 1053 | |
| 18 | 4 | Katarina Johnson-Thompson | Great Britain | 13.48 | 1053 | =PB |
| 19 | 4 | Chantae McMillan | United States | 13.49 | 1052 | |
| 20 | 4 | Grit Šadeiko | Estonia | 13.50 | 1050 | |
| 21 | 4 | Olga Kurban | Russia | 13.56 | 1041 | |
| 22 | 3 | Sharon Day | United States | 13.57 | 1040 | PB |
| 23 | 2 | Nataliya Dobrynska | Ukraine | 13.57 | 1040 | SB |
| 24 | 3 | Jessica Samuelsson | Sweden | 13.58 | 1039 | PB |
| 25 | 2 | Nadine Broersen | Netherlands | 13.64 | 1030 | PB |
| 26 | 3 | Aiga Grabuste | Latvia | 13.65 | 1028 | SB |
| 27 | 3 | Laura Ikauniece | Latvia | 13.71 | 1020 | |
| 28 | 2 | Marisa De Aniceto | France | 13.74 | 1015 | SB |
| 29 | 2 | Sofia Ifadidou | Greece | 13.82 | 1004 | |
| 30 | 2 | Sarah Cowley | New Zealand | 13.95 | 985 | |
| 31 | 1 | Yana Maksimava | Belarus | 13.97 | 983 | PB |
| 32 | 1 | Austra Skujytė | Lithuania | 14.00 | 978 | SB |
| 33 | 2 | Eliška Klučinová | Czech Republic | 14.01 | 977 | PB |
| 34 | 1 | Ida Marcussen | Norway | 14.08 | 967 | =SB |
| 35 | 2 | Irina Karpova | Kazakhstan | 14.21 | 949 | |
| 36 | 1 | Györgyi Farkas | Hungary | 14.33 | 932 | |
| 37 | 1 | Julia Mächtig | Germany | 14.54 | 903 | |
| 38 | 1 | Ivona Dadic | Austria | 14.58 | 898 | PB |
| — | 2 | Margaret Simpson | Ghana | DNS | 0 | |

=== High jump ===
| Rank | Group | Name | Nationality | 1.56 | 1.59 | 1.62 | 1.65 | 1.68 | 1.71 | 1.74 | 1.77 | 1.80 | 1.83 | 1.86 | 1.89 | 1.92 | 1.95 | Result | Points | Notes | Overall | Overall Rank |
|---|---|---|---|---|---|---|---|---|---|---|---|---|---|---|---|---|---|---|---|---|---|---|
| 1 | A | Austra Skujytė | Lithuania | – | – | – | – | – | o | o | o | o | xo | xxo | xxo | o | xxx | 1.92 | 1132 | PB | 2110 | 4 |
| 2 | A | Katarina Johnson-Thompson | Great Britain | – | – | – | – | – | o | o | o | xo | o | xo | xo | xxx | | 1.89 | 1093 | PB | 2146 | 3 |
| 3 | A | Yana Maksimava | Belarus | – | – | – | – | – | – | o | o | o | o | xo | xxo | xxx | | 1.89 | 1093 | | 2076 | 11 |
| 4 | A | Hyleas Fountain | United States | – | – | – | – | – | – | o | o | o | o | o | xxx | | | 1.86 | 1054 | | 2224 | 2 |
| 5 | A | Nadine Broersen | Netherlands | – | – | – | – | – | – | o | o | xo | o | xxo | xxx | | | 1.86 | 1054 | SB | 2084 | 10 |
| 5 | A | Jessica Ennis | Great Britain | – | – | – | – | – | – | o | o | xo | o | xxo | xxx | | | 1.86 | 1054 | | 2249 | 1 |
| 7 | A | Lilli Schwarzkopf | Germany | – | – | – | – | – | xo | o | o | xo | o | xxx | | | | 1.83 | 1016 | =PB | 2102 | 7 |
| 7 | A | Kristina Savitskaya | Russia | – | – | – | – | – | o | xo | xo | o | o | xxx | | | | 1.83 | 1016 | | 2085 | 9 |
| 9 | A | Laura Ikauniece | Latvia | – | – | – | – | – | – | o | xo | o | xo | xxx | | | | 1.83 | 1016 | | 2036 | 15 |
| 10 | A | Nataliya Dobrynska | Ukraine | – | – | – | – | – | o | xo | o | xo | xo | xxx | | | | 1.83 | 1016 | | 2056 | 12 |
| 11 | A | Brianne Theisen | Canada | – | – | – | – | – | o | o | o | xo | xxo | xxx | | | | 1.83 | 1016 | | 2096 | 8 |
| 12 | B | Lyudmyla Yosypenko | Ukraine | – | – | – | – | o | o | xo | o | xo | xxo | xxx | | | | 1.83 | 1016 | SB | 2103 | 6 |
| 13 | A | Jennifer Oeser | Germany | – | – | – | – | – | – | o | o | o | xxx | | | | | 1.80 | 978 | | 2040 | 14 |
| 13 | A | Hanna Melnychenko | Ukraine | – | – | – | – | – | o | o | o | o | xxx | | | | | 1.80 | 978 | | 2055 | 13 |
| 13 | A | Eliška Klučinová | Czech Republic | – | – | – | – | – | o | o | o | o | xxx | | | | | 1.80 | 978 | | 1955 | 25 |
| 16 | A | Tatyana Chernova | Russia | – | – | – | – | – | – | o | o | xo | xxx | | | | | 1.80 | 978 | | 2031 | 16 |
| 17 | B | Ivona Dadic | Austria | – | – | o | o | o | o | o | xo | xo | xxx | | | | | 1.80 | 978 | | 1876 | 33 |
| 18 | A | Sarah Cowley | New Zealand | – | – | – | – | – | – | o | o | xxo | xxx | | | | | 1.80 | 978 | | 1963 | 24 |
| 19 | A | Antoinette Nana Djimou Ida | France | – | – | – | – | – | o | o | xo | xxo | xxx | | | | | 1.80 | 978 | | 2108 | 5 |
| 20 | A | Olga Kurban | Russia | – | – | – | – | – | o | o | xxo | xxo | xxx | | | | | 1.80 | 978 | | 2019 | 18 |
| 21 | B | Györgyi Farkas | Hungary | – | – | – | o | – | xo | xo | xo | xxo | xxx | | | | | 1.80 | 978 | | 1910 | 30 |
| 21 | B | Dafne Schippers | Netherlands | – | – | – | o | o | o | xo | xxo | xxo | xxx | | | | | 1.80 | 978 | PB | 2031 | 17 |
| 23 | B | Aiga Grabuste | Latvia | – | – | – | – | o | o | o | xo | xxx | | | | | | 1.77 | 941 | SB | 1969 | 23 |
| 24 | B | Jessica Samuelsson | Sweden | – | – | o | o | o | o | xxo | xo | xx– | – | r | | | | 1.77 | 941 | =PB | 1980 | 22 |
| 25 | A | Sharon Day | United States | – | – | – | – | – | – | xo | xxo | xxx | | | | | | 1.77 | 941 | | 1981 | 21 |
| 26 | A | Uhunoma Osazuwa | Nigeria | – | – | – | – | o | o | xxo | xxo | xxx | | | | | | 1.77 | 941 | | 1997 | 20 |
| 27 | B | Grit Šadeiko | Estonia | – | – | – | o | o | o | xo | xxx | | | | | | | 1.74 | 903 | | 1953 | 26 |
| 28 | B | Ellen Sprunger | Switzerland | – | – | xo | o | xo | xo | xxx | | | | | | | | 1.71 | 867 | | 1939 | 27 |
| 29 | B | Marisa De Aniceto | France | – | – | o | o | xo | xxo | xxx | | | | | | | | 1.71 | 867 | SB | 1882 | 31 |
| 30 | B | Irina Karpova | Kazakhstan | – | – | – | o | o | xxx | | | | | | | | | 1.68 | 830 | | 1779 | 36 |
| 30 | B | Sofia Ifadidou | Greece | o | o | o | o | o | xxx | | | | | | | | | 1.68 | 830 | | 1834 | 34 |
| 30 | B | Jessica Zelinka | Canada | – | – | – | o | o | xxx | | | | | | | | | 1.68 | 830 | | 2008 | 19 |
| 30 | B | Ida Marcussen | Norway | – | – | o | o | o | xxx | | | | | | | | | 1.68 | 830 | | 1797 | 35 |
| 34 | B | Julia Mächtig | Germany | – | – | – | xo | o | xxx | | | | | | | | | 1.68 | 830 | | 1733 | 38 |
| 35 | B | Chantae McMillan | United States | o | o | o | o | xo | xxx | | | | | | | | | 1.68 | 830 | | 1882 | 32 |
| 36 | B | Karolina Tymińska | Poland | – | – | xo | o | xxo | xxx | | | | | | | | | 1.68 | 830 | | 1921 | 29 |
| 37 | B | Sara Aerts | Belgium | – | – | o | xo | xxx | | | | | | | | | | 1.65 | 795 | SB | 1928 | 28 |
| 38 | B | Louise Hazel | Great Britain | o | o | xxx | | | | | | | | | | | | 1.59 | 724 | | 1777 | 37 |

=== Shot put ===
| Rank | Group | Name | Nationality | #1 | #2 | #3 | Result | Points | Notes | Overall | Overall Rank |
|---|---|---|---|---|---|---|---|---|---|---|---|
| 1 | A | Austra Skujytė | Lithuania | 15.96 | X | 17.31 | 17.31 | 1016 | WHB, SB | 3126 | 1 |
| 2 | A | Nataliya Dobrynska | Ukraine | X | X | 15.05 | 15.05 | 864 | | 2920 | 5 |
| 3 | A | Julia Mächtig | Germany | 14.99 | X | X | 14.99 | 860 | | 2593 | 33 |
| 4 | A | Chantae McMillan | United States | 14.24 | 14.03 | 14.92 | 14.92 | 856 | | 2738 | 23 |
| 5 | A | Jessica Zelinka | Canada | 14.03 | 14.81 | 13.70 | 14.81 | 848 | SB | 2856 | 10 |
| 6 | B | Kristina Savitskaya | Russia | 14.77 | 14.20 | X | 14.77 | 845 | | 2930 | 4 |
| 7 | A | Lilli Schwarzkopf | Germany | 13.94 | 13.86 | 14.77 | 14.77 | 845 | SB | 2947 | 3 |
| 8 | B | Sara Aerts | Belgium | 13.60 | 14.43 | X | 14.43 | 823 | PB | 2751 | 21 |
| 9 | A | Sharon Day | United States | 13.72 | 13.91 | 14.28 | 14.28 | 813 | =PB | 2794 | 17 |
| 10 | A | Jessica Ennis | Great Britain | 13.85 | 14.28 | 13.02 | 14.28 | 813 | | 3062 | 2 |
| 11 | A | Antoinette Nana Djimou Ida | France | 13.10 | 14.26 | 13.89 | 14.26 | 811 | | 2919 | 6 |
| 12 | A | Jessica Samuelsson | Sweden | 14.18 | 14.11 | 13.71 | 14.18 | 806 | | 2786 | 18 |
| 13 | A | Tatyana Chernova | Russia | 13.56 | X | 14.17 | 14.17 | 805 | SB | 2836 | 13 |
| 14 | B | Jennifer Oeser | Germany | 13.67 | 14.16 | 13.81 | 14.16 | 805 | SB | 2845 | 12 |
| 15 | A | Yana Maksimava | Belarus | 13.88 | 13.77 | 14.09 | 14.09 | 800 | | 2876 | 9 |
| 16 | A | Lyudmyla Yosypenko | Ukraine | 13.90 | X | 13.40 | 13.90 | 787 | | 2890 | 7 |
| 17 | A | Karolina Tymińska | Poland | 13.31 | 13.74 | 13.46 | 13.74 | 777 | | 2698 | 26 |
| 18 | A | Olga Kurban | Russia | 13.71 | 13.25 | 13.26 | 13.71 | 775 | | 2794 | 16 |
| 19 | A | Dafne Schippers | Netherlands | 13.33 | 13.67 | X | 13.67 | 772 | | 2803 | 15 |
| 20 | B | Nadine Broersen | Netherlands | 12.16 | 13.24 | 13.57 | 13.57 | 765 | | 2849 | 11 |
| 21 | B | Györgyi Farkas | Hungary | 13.55 | 13.49 | X | 13.55 | 764 | | 2674 | 28 |
| 22 | A | Aiga Grabuste | Latvia | 12.28 | 13.52 | X | 13.52 | 762 | | 2731 | 24 |
| 23 | B | Ida Marcussen | Norway | 12.70 | 13.17 | 13.46 | 13.46 | 758 | SB | 2555 | 35 |
| 24 | B | Marisa De Aniceto | France | 12.23 | 12.52 | 13.09 | 13.09 | 733 | PB | 2615 | 32 |
| 25 | A | Hanna Melnychenko | Ukraine | 12.85 | 12.75 | 12.96 | 12.96 | 725 | | 2780 | 19 |
| 26 | B | Sofia Ifadidou | Greece | 12.78 | 12.96 | X | 12.96 | 725 | | 2559 | 34 |
| 27 | A | Eliška Klučinová | Czech Republic | 12.93 | X | X | 12.93 | 723 | | 2678 | 27 |
| 28 | B | Brianne Theisen | Canada | 12.89 | 12.62 | 12.84 | 12.84 | 720 | PB | 2816 | 14 |
| 29 | B | Louise Hazel | Great Britain | 11.69 | 12.41 | 12.81 | 12.81 | 715 | | 2492 | 37 |
| 30 | B | Uhunoma Osazuwa | Nigeria | 12.21 | 12.77 | 12.05 | 12.77 | 712 | | 2709 | 25 |
| 31 | B | Laura Ikauniece | Latvia | 11.67 | 11.48 | 12.64 | 12.64 | 704 | | 2740 | 22 |
| 32 | B | Ellen Sprunger | Switzerland | 11.48 | 11.58 | 12.62 | 12.62 | 702 | | 2641 | 31 |
| 33 | B | Grit Šadeiko | Estonia | 12.43 | 12.19 | X | 12.43 | 690 | | 2643 | 30 |
| 34 | B | Sarah Cowley | New Zealand | 12.23 | 11.97 | 12.37 | 12.37 | 686 | | 2649 | 29 |
| 35 | B | Ivona Dadic | Austria | 12.19 | 11.13 | X | 12.19 | 674 | | 2550 | 36 |
| 36 | B | Hyleas Fountain | United States | 11.99 | 11.84 | 11.40 | 11.99 | 660 | | 2884 | 8 |
| 37 | A | Irina Karpova | Kazakhstan | 11.68 | X | 11.39 | 11.68 | 640 | | 2419 | 38 |
| 38 | B | Katarina Johnson-Thompson | Great Britain | 11.29 | 10.88 | 11.32 | 11.32 | 616 | | 2762 | 20 |

=== 200 metres ===
Wind: +0.8, +0.9, +0.3, +0.6, -0.3 m/s.

| Rank | Heat | Athlete | Nationality | Result | Points | Notes | Overall | Overall Rank |
|---|---|---|---|---|---|---|---|---|
| 1 | 5 | Dafne Schippers | Netherlands | 22.83 | 1096 | | 3899 | 6 |
| 2 | 5 | Jessica Ennis | Great Britain | 22.83 | 1096 | PB | 4158 | 1 |
| 3 | 5 | Jessica Zelinka | Canada | 23.32 | 1047 | PB | 3903 | 3 |
| 4 | 3 | Ellen Sprunger | Switzerland | 23.59 | 1020 | PB | 3661 | 23 |
| 5 | 4 | Hyleas Fountain | United States | 23.64 | 1016 | SB | 3900 | 5 |
| 6 | 5 | Tatyana Chernova | Russia | 23.67 | 1013 | | 3849 | 9 |
| 7 | 4 | Lyudmyla Yosypenko | Ukraine | 23.68 | 1012 | =PB | 3902 | 4 |
| 8 | 1 | Karolina Tymińska | Poland | 23.71 | 1009 | | 3707 | 21 |
| 9 | 5 | Katarina Johnson-Thompson | Great Britain | 23.73 | 1007 | PB | 3769 | 14 |
| 10 | 5 | Olga Kurban | Russia | 23.88 | 992 | | 3786 | 13 |
| 11 | 4 | Hanna Melnychenko | Ukraine | 24.09 | 972 | PB | 3752 | 16 |
| 12 | 3 | Laura Ikauniece | Latvia | 24.16 | 965 | PB | 3705 | 22 |
| 13 | 4 | Grit Šadeiko | Estonia | 24.25 | 957 | | 3600 | 26 |
| 14 | 4 | Jessica Samuelsson | Sweden | 24.25 | 957 | | 3743 | 17 |
| 15 | 4 | Ivona Dadic | Austria | 24.29 | 953 | | 3503 | 28 |
| 16 | 5 | Brianne Theisen | Canada | 24.35 | 947 | | 3763 | 15 |
| 17 | 4 | Sharon Day | United States | 24.36 | 946 | | 3740 | 18 |
| 18 | 3 | Jennifer Oeser | Germany | 24.39 | 944 | SB | 3789 | 12 |
| 19 | 3 | Kristina Savitskaya | Russia | 24.46 | 937 | PB | 3867 | 7 |
| 20 | 2 | Louise Hazel | Great Britain | 24.48 | 935 | SB | 3427 | 34 |
| 21 | 4 | Uhunoma Osazuwa | Nigeria | 24.62 | 922 | | 3631 | 24 |
| 22 | 2 | Nataliya Dobrynska | Ukraine | 24.69 | 915 | SB | 3835 | 10 |
| 23 | 3 | Antoinette Nana Djimou Ida | France | 24.72 | 913 | | 3832 | 11 |
| 24 | 2 | Lilli Schwarzkopf | Germany | 24.77 | 908 | SB | 3855 | 8 |
| 25 | 3 | Eliška Klučinová | Czech Republic | 25.00 | 887 | | 3565 | 27 |
| 26 | 1 | Nadine Broersen | Netherlands | 25.13 | 875 | PB | 3724 | 20 |
| 27 | 2 | Ida Marcussen | Norway | 25.15 | 873 | | 3428 | 33 |
| 28 | 3 | Chantae McMillan | United States | 25.25 | 864 | | 3602 | 25 |
| 29 | 1 | Marisa De Aniceto | France | 25.26 | 863 | SB | 3478 | 31 |
| 30 | 2 | Julia Mächtig | Germany | 25.38 | 852 | | 3445 | 32 |
| 31 | 2 | Irina Karpova | Kazakhstan | 25.42 | 849 | | 3268 | 36 |
| 32 | 2 | Austra Skujytė | Lithuania | 25.43 | 848 | | 3974 | 2 |
| 33 | 1 | Yana Maksimava | Belarus | 25.43 | 848 | SB | 3724 | 19 |
| 34 | 2 | Sarah Cowley | New Zealand | 25.60 | 833 | | 3482 | 30 |
| 35 | 1 | Györgyi Farkas | Hungary | 25.72 | 822 | | 3496 | 29 |
| 36 | 1 | Sofia Ifadidou | Greece | 25.91 | 805 | | 3364 | 35 |
| — | 5 | Sara Aerts | Belgium | DNF | 0 | | 2751 | 37 |
| — | 3 | Aiga Grabuste | Latvia | DNS | 0 | | DNF | — |

=== Long jump ===
| Rank | Group | Name | Nationality | #1 | #2 | #3 | Result | Points | Notes | Overall | Overall Rank |
|---|---|---|---|---|---|---|---|---|---|---|---|
| 1 | B | Tatyana Chernova | Russia | 6.44 | 6.54 | 6.40 | 6.54 | 1020 | | 4869 | 3 |
| 2 | B | Jessica Ennis | Great Britain | 5.95 | 6.40 | 6.48 | 6.48 | 1001 | | 5159 | 1 |
| 3 | B | Hanna Melnychenko | Ukraine | 6.40 | X | 6.30 | 6.40 | 975 | | 4727 | 9 |
| 4 | B | Lyudmyla Yosypenko | Ukraine | 6.20 | 6.31 | 6.09 | 6.31 | 946 | SB | 4848 | 4 |
| 5 | A | Lilli Schwarzkopf | Germany | 6.30 | X | 6.30 | 6.30 | 943 | SB | 4798 | 6 |
| 6 | B | Dafne Schippers | Netherlands | 6.27 | 6.28 | X | 6.28 | 937 | | 4836 | 5 |
| 7 | B | Austra Skujytė | Lithuania | X | 6.25 | 6.17 | 6.25 | 927 | | 4901 | 2 |
| 8 | A | Kristina Savitskaya | Russia | 6.21 | X | X | 6.21 | 915 | | 4782 | 7 |
| 9 | B | Katarina Johnson-Thompson | Great Britain | 6.03 | 6.19 | 6.01 | 6.19 | 908 | | 4677 | 12 |
| 10 | A | Jessica Samuelsson | Sweden | 6.10 | 6.03 | 6.18 | 6.18 | 905 | =SB | 4648 | 14 |
| 11 | B | Laura Ikauniece | Latvia | 6.10 | 6.08 | 6.13 | 6.13 | 890 | | 4595 | 16 |
| 12 | B | Eliška Klučinová | Czech Republic | 6.10 | 5.79 | 6.13 | 6.13 | 890 | | 4455 | 23 |
| 13 | B | Antoinette Nana Djimou Ida | France | 5.96 | 6.13 | 6.07 | 6.13 | 890 | | 4722 | 11 |
| 14 | A | Grit Šadeiko | Estonia | 5.97 | 6.11 | X | 6.11 | 883 | SB | 4483 | 21 |
| 15 | B | Jennifer Oeser | Germany | X | 6.07 | 6.00 | 6.07 | 871 | | 4660 | 13 |
| 16 | A | Györgyi Farkas | Hungary | 5.88 | 5.45 | 6.07 | 6.07 | 871 | =SB | 4367 | 25 |
| 17 | B | Hyleas Fountain | United States | X | 6.05 | X | 6.05 | 865 | | 4765 | 8 |
| 18 | A | Brianne Theisen | Canada | 5.96 | 6.01 | 4.86 | 6.01 | 853 | PB | 4616 | 15 |
| 19 | A | Ivona Dadic | Austria | 6.00 | 5.90 | 5.92 | 6.00 | 850 | | 4353 | 26 |
| 20 | A | Sarah Cowley | New Zealand | 5.56 | X | 6.00 | 6.00 | 850 | | 4332 | 27 |
| 21 | A | Yana Maksimava | Belarus | X | 5.88 | 5.99 | 5.99 | 846 | | 4570 | 18 |
| 22 | A | Nadine Broersen | Netherlands | X | 5.94 | X | 5.94 | 831 | | 4555 | 19 |
| 23 | A | Jessica Zelinka | Canada | 5.85 | 5.87 | 5.91 | 5.91 | 822 | SB | 4725 | 10 |
| 24 | A | Ellen Sprunger | Switzerland | 5.61 | 5.88 | 5.76 | 5.88 | 813 | | 4474 | 22 |
| 25 | A | Sharon Day | United States | X | 5.83 | 5.85 | 5.85 | 804 | | 4544 | 20 |
| 26 | B | Olga Kurban | Russia | 5.72 | X | 5.83 | 5.83 | 798 | | 4584 | 17 |
| 27 | B | Ida Marcussen | Norway | X | 5.82 | X | 5.82 | 795 | | 4223 | 30 |
| 28 | A | Sofia Ifadidou | Greece | 5.81 | 5.53 | X | 5.81 | 792 | | 4156 | 32 |
| 29 | A | Louise Hazel | Great Britain | 5.45 | 5.56 | 5.77 | 5.77 | 780 | SB | 4207 | 31 |
| 30 | A | Marisa De Aniceto | France | X | 5.76 | X | 5.76 | 777 | | 4255 | 29 |
| 31 | B | Uhunoma Osazuwa | Nigeria | X | 5.74 | X | 5.74 | 771 | | 4402 | 24 |
| 32 | A | Irina Karpova | Kazakhstan | 5.70 | 5.46 | X | 5.70 | 759 | | 4027 | 34 |
| 33 | A | Chantae McMillan | United States | 5.10 | 5.21 | 5.37 | 5.37 | 663 | | 4265 | 28 |
| 34 | B | Julia Mächtig | Germany | X | X | 4.06 | 4.06 | 322 | | 3767 | 35 |
| 35 | B | Nataliya Dobrynska | Ukraine | X | X | 3.70 | 3.70 | 242 | | 4077 | 33 |
| — | B | Karolina Tymińska | Poland | X | X | X | NM | 0 | | 3707 | 36 |
| — | A | Sara Aerts | Belgium | — | — | — | DNS | 0 | | DNF | — |

=== Javelin throw ===
| Rank | Group | Name | Nationality | #1 | #2 | #3 | Result | Points | Notes | Overall | Overall Rank |
|---|---|---|---|---|---|---|---|---|---|---|---|
| 1 | B | Sofia Ifadidou | Greece | 54.54 | 56.96 | 54.79 | 56.96 | 995 | OHB, PB | 5151 | 25 |
| 2 | B | Antoinette Nana Djimou Ida | France | 55.87 | 53.78 | 51.48 | 55.87 | 974 | PB | 5696 | 4 |
| 3 | B | Marisa De Aniceto | France | 49.23 | 51.98 | 50.98 | 51.98 | 899 | PB | 5154 | 24 |
| 4 | B | Nadine Broersen | Netherlands | 50.16 | 51.98 | 48.63 | 51.98 | 899 | | 5454 | 12 |
| 5 | B | Lilli Schwarzkopf | Germany | 49.37 | 51.73 | X | 51.73 | 894 | | 5692 | 5 |
| 6 | B | Laura Ikauniece | Latvia | 48.09 | 48.44 | 51.27 | 51.27 | 885 | | 5480 | 9 |
| 7 | B | Austra Skujytė | Lithuania | 48.64 | X | 51.13 | 51.13 | 882 | SB | 5783 | 2 |
| 8 | B | Chantae McMillan | United States | 45.12 | 49.56 | 49.78 | 49.78 | 856 | | 5121 | 26 |
| 9 | B | Lyudmyla Yosypenko | Ukraine | 49.63 | 47.70 | X | 49.63 | 853 | SB | 5701 | 3 |
| 10 | B | Jessica Ennis | Great Britain | 46.61 | 45.99 | 47.49 | 47.49 | 812 | PB | 5971 | 1 |
| 11 | A | Louise Hazel | Great Britain | 39.90 | 42.17 | 47.38 | 47.38 | 809 | PB | 5016 | 30 |
| 12 | B | Jennifer Oeser | Germany | 44.59 | 46.61 | 46.29 | 46.61 | 795 | | 5455 | 11 |
| 13 | A | Györgyi Farkas | Hungary | 43.74 | 43.49 | 46.52 | 46.52 | 793 | SB | 5160 | 23 |
| 14 | B | Brianne Theisen | Canada | 46.47 | 45.12 | 45.13 | 46.47 | 792 | PB | 5408 | 14 |
| 15 | B | Tatyana Chernova | Russia | 46.29 | 45.09 | 44.76 | 46.29 | 788 | | 5657 | 6 |
| 16 | A | Jessica Zelinka | Canada | 40.22 | 41.82 | 45.75 | 45.75 | 778 | | 5503 | 8 |
| 17 | B | Eliška Klučinová | Czech Republic | 45.65 | X | X | 45.65 | 776 | | 5231 | 21 |
| 18 | B | Ellen Sprunger | Switzerland | 40.98 | 41.24 | 45.63 | 45.63 | 776 | | 5250 | 20 |
| 19 | B | Julia Mächtig | Germany | X | 43.79 | 44.40 | 44.40 | 752 | | 4519 | 33 |
| 20 | A | Grit Šadeiko | Estonia | 44.12 | X | 43.31 | 44.12 | 747 | | 5230 | 22 |
| 21 | A | Sharon Day | United States | 42.54 | 43.90 | 43.66 | 43.90 | 742 | | 5286 | 17 |
| 22 | A | Hanna Melnychenko | Ukraine | 43.86 | 40.05 | 41.01 | 43.86 | 742 | SB | 5469 | 10 |
| 23 | B | Kristina Savitskaya | Russia | 39.41 | 30.04 | 43.70 | 43.70 | 738 | | 5520 | 7 |
| 24 | A | Yana Maksimava | Belarus | 40.60 | 42.33 | 42.24 | 42.33 | 712 | SB | 5282 | 18 |
| 25 | B | Ida Marcussen | Norway | 42.26 | 42.23 | X | 42.26 | 711 | | 4934 | 31 |
| 26 | A | Jessica Samuelsson | Sweden | 38.15 | 39.93 | 42.02 | 42.02 | 706 | PB | 5354 | 15 |
| 27 | A | Sarah Cowley | New Zealand | 41.90 | 39.32 | 36.05 | 41.90 | 704 | PB | 5036 | 29 |
| 28 | A | Ivona Dadic | Austria | 41.82 | 36.11 | X | 41.82 | 702 | PB | 5055 | 28 |
| 29 | A | Olga Kurban | Russia | 38.58 | 34.34 | 40.36 | 40.36 | 674 | | 5258 | 19 |
| 30 | A | Katarina Johnson-Thompson | Great Britain | X | 24.84 | 38.37 | 38.37 | 636 | | 5313 | 16 |
| 31 | A | Dafne Schippers | Netherlands | 34.63 | 35.86 | 36.63 | 36.63 | 603 | | 5439 | 13 |
| 32 | A | Irina Karpova | Kazakhstan | 35.75 | 34.11 | 30.99 | 35.75 | 586 | | 4613 | 32 |
| 33 | A | Hyleas Fountain | United States | X | 21.60 | X | 21.60 | 319 | | 5084 | 27 |
| — | A | Nataliya Dobrynska | Ukraine | — | — | — | DNS | 0 | | DNF | — |
| — | A | Karolina Tymińska | Poland | — | — | — | DNS | 0 | | DNF | — |
| — | A | Uhunoma Osazuwa | Nigeria | — | — | — | DNS | 0 | | DNF | — |

=== 800 metres ===
| Rank | Heat | Athlete | Nationality | Result | Points | Notes |
|---|---|---|---|---|---|---|
| 1 | 4 | Jessica Ennis | Great Britain | 2:08.65 | 984 | SB |
| 2 | 4 | Jessica Zelinka | Canada | 2:09.15 | 977 | SB |
| 3 | 3 | Brianne Theisen | Canada | 2:09.27 | 975 | PB |
| 4 | 4 | Tatyana Chernova | Russia | 2:09.56 | 971 | |
| 5 | 4 | Lilli Schwarzkopf | Germany | 2:10.50 | 957 | SB |
| 6 | 3 | Katarina Johnson-Thompson | Great Britain | 2:10.76 | 954 | PB |
| 7 | 3 | Sharon Day | United States | 2:11.31 | 946 | PB |
| 8 | 3 | Jessica Samuelsson | Sweden | 2:11.31 | 946 | |
| 9 | 4 | Laura Ikauniece | Latvia | 2:12.13 | 934 | PB |
| 10 | 4 | Kristina Savitskaya | Russia | 2:12.27 | 932 | PB |
| 11 | 3 | Hanna Melnychenko | Ukraine | 2:12.90 | 923 | SB |
| 12 | 4 | Lyudmyla Yosypenko | Ukraine | 2:13.28 | 917 | SB |
| 13 | 2 | Yana Maksimava | Belarus | 2:13.37 | 916 | SB |
| 14 | 1 | Ida Marcussen | Norway | 2:13.62 | 912 | |
| 15 | 3 | Dafne Schippers | Netherlands | 2:15.52 | 885 | PB |
| 16 | 1 | Ivona Dadic | Austria | 2:15.90 | 880 | |
| 17 | 4 | Antoinette Nana Djimou Ida | France | 2:15.94 | 880 | PB |
| 18 | 2 | Eliška Klučinová | Czech Republic | 2:16.08 | 878 | SB |
| 19 | 2 | Marisa De Aniceto | France | 2:16.20 | 876 | SB |
| 20 | 3 | Nadine Broersen | Netherlands | 2:16.98 | 865 | PB |
| 21 | 2 | Ellen Sprunger | Switzerland | 2:17.54 | 857 | |
| 22 | 2 | Györgyi Farkas | Hungary | 2:17.83 | 853 | |
| 23 | 1 | Louise Hazel | Great Britain | 2:18.78 | 840 | |
| 24 | 1 | Sarah Cowley | New Zealand | 2:19.01 | 837 | |
| 25 | 2 | Olga Kurban | Russia | 2:19.82 | 826 | |
| 26 | 1 | Julia Mächtig | Germany | 2:20.34 | 819 | |
| 27 | 4 | Austra Skujytė | Lithuania | 2:20.59 | 816 | |
| 28 | 2 | Sofia Ifadidou | Greece | 2:22.03 | 796 | |
| 29 | 2 | Grit Šadeiko | Estonia | 2:23.01 | 783 | |
| 30 | 1 | Irina Karpova | Kazakhstan | 2:28.93 | 706 | |
| 31 | 1 | Chantae McMillan | United States | 2:40.55 | 567 | |
| — | 3 | Jennifer Oeser | Germany | DNF | 0 | |
| — | 1 | Hyleas Fountain | United States | DNS | 0 | |

== Overall results ==
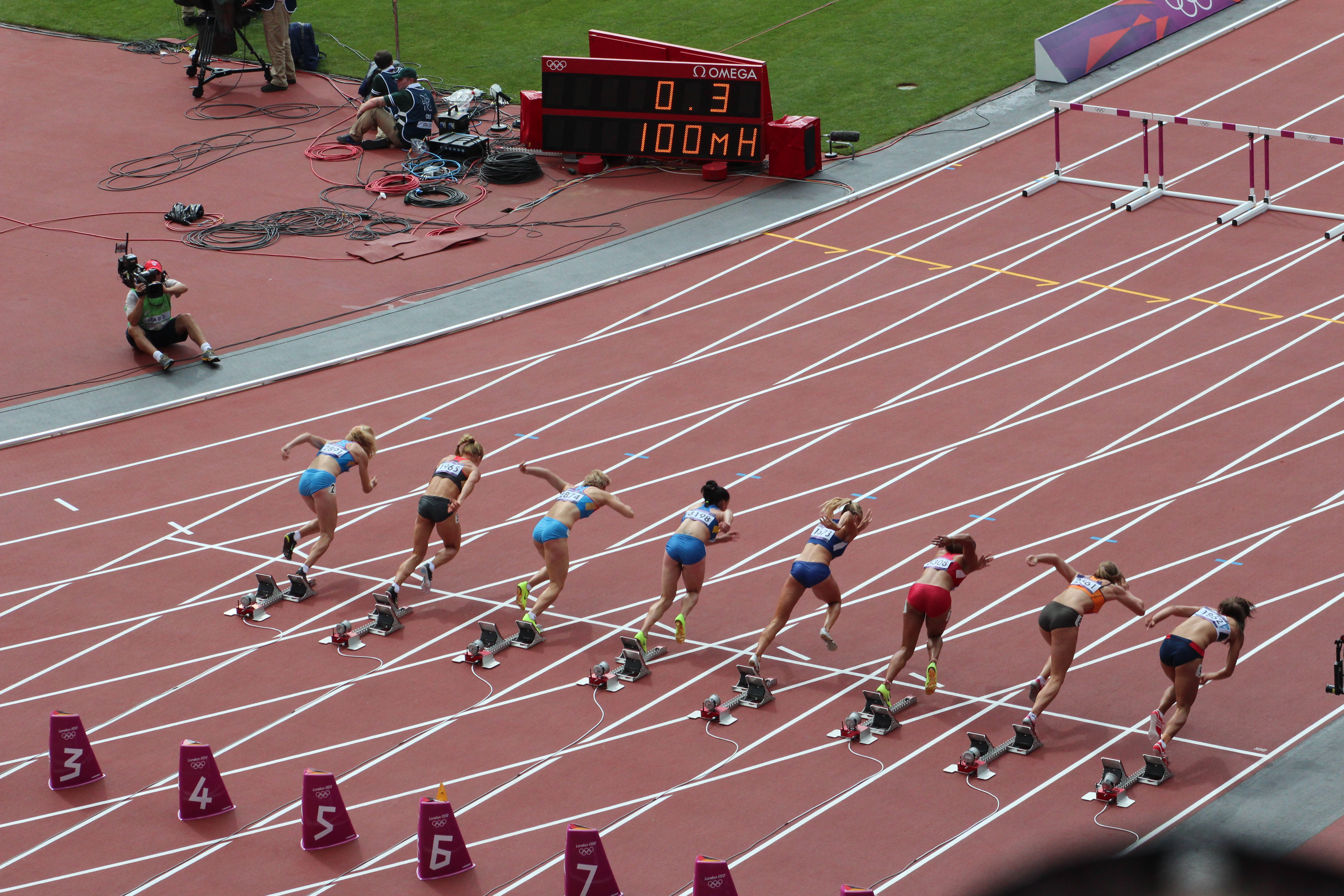
Start of heat 4 in 100 m hurdles

The final results of the event are in the following table.

Key

♦ The highest mark recorded in each event is highlighted in yellow with a diamond symbol.

| Rank | Athlete | Points | 100 h | HJ | SP | 200 m | LJ | JT | 800 m |
|---|---|---|---|---|---|---|---|---|---|
| 1st place, gold medalist(s) | Jessica Ennis (GBR) | 6955 (WL, NR) | 1195; 12.54 s ^{♦} | 1054; 1.86 m | 813; 14.28 m | 1096; 22.83 s ^{♦} | 1001; 6.48 m ^{♦} | 812; 47.49 m | 984; 2:08.65 ^{♦} |
| 2nd place, silver medalist(s) | Lilli Schwarzkopf (GER) | 6649 (PB) | 1086; 13.26 s | 1016; 1.83 m | 845; 14.77 m | 908; 24.77 s | 943; 6.30 m | 894; 51.73 m | 957; 2:10.50 |
| 3rd place, bronze medalist(s) | Austra Skujytė (LTU) | 6599 (PB) | 978; 14.00 s | 1132; 1.92 m ^{♦} | 1016; 17.31 m ^{♦} | 848; 25.43 s | 927; 6.25 m | 882; 51.13 m | 816; 2:20.59 |
| 4 | Antoinette Nana Djimou Ida (FRA) | 6576 (PB) | 1130; 12.96 s | 978; 1.80 m | 811; 14.26 m | 913; 24.72 s | 890; 6.13 m | 974; 55.87 m | 912; 2:13.62 |
| 5 | Jessica Zelinka (CAN) | 6480 | 1178; 12.65 s | 830; 1.68 m | 848; 14.81 m | 1047; 23.32 s | 822; 5.91 m | 778; 45.75 m | 977; 2:09.15 |
| 6 | Kristina Savitskaya (RUS) | 6452 | 1069; 13.37 s | 1016; 1.83 m | 845; 14.77 m | 937; 24.46 s | 915; 6.21 m | 738; 43.70 m | 932; 2:12.27 |
| 7 | Laura Ikauniece (LAT) | 6414 (=NR) | 1020; 13.71 s | 1016; 1.83 m | 704; 12.64 m | 965; 24.16 s | 890; 6.13 m | 885; 51.27 m | 934; 2:12.13 |
| 8 | Hanna Melnychenko (UKR) | 6392 | 1077; 13.32 s | 978; 1.80 m | 725; 12.96 m | 972; 24.09 s | 975; 6.40 m | 742; 43.86 m | 923; 2:12.90 |
| 9 | Brianne Theisen (CAN) | 6383 | 1080; 13.30 s | 1016; 1.83 m | 720; 12.89 m | 947; 24.35 s | 853; 6.01 m | 792; 46.47 m | 975; 2:09.27 |
| 10 | Dafne Schippers (NED) | 6324 | 1053; 13.48 s | 978; 1.80 m | 772; 13.67 m | 1096; 22.83 s ^{♦} | 937; 6.28 m | 603; 36.63 m | 885; 2:15.52 |
| 11 | Nadine Broersen (NED) | 6319 (PB) | 1030; 13.64 s | 1054; 1.86 m | 765; 13.57 m | 875; 25.13 s | 831; 5.94 m | 899; 51.98 m | 865; 2:16.98 |
| 12 | Jessica Samuelsson (SWE) | 6300 (PB) | 1039; 13.58 s | 941; 1.77 m | 806; 14.18 m | 957; 24.25 s | 905; 6.18 m | 706; 42.02 m | 946; 2:11.31 |
| 13 | Katarina Johnson-Thompson (GBR) | 6267 (NJ) | 1053; 13.48 s | 1093; 1.89 m | 616; 11.32 m | 1007; 23.73 s | 908; 6.19 m | 636; 38.37 m | 954; 2:10.76 |
| 14 | Sharon Day (USA) | 6232 | 1040; 13.57 s | 941; 1.77 m | 813; 14.28 m | 946; 24.36 s | 804; 5.85 m | 742; 43.90 m | 946; 2:11.31 |
| 15 | Yana Maksimava (BLR) | 6198 (PB) | 983; 13.97 s | 1093; 1.89 m | 800; 14.09 m | 848; 25.43 s | 846; 5.99 m | 712; 42.33 m | 916; 2:13.37 |
| 16 | Eliška Klučinová (CZE) | 6109 | 977; 14.01 s | 978; 1.80 m | 723; 12.93 m | 887; 25.00 s | 890; 6.13 m | 776; 45.65 m | 878; 2:16.08 |
| 17 | Ellen Sprunger (SUI) | 6107 | 1072; 13.35 s | 867; 1.71 m | 702; 12.62 m | 1020; 23.59 s | 813; 5.88 m | 776; 45.63 m | 857; 2:17.54 |
| 18 | Olga Kurban (RUS) | 6084 | 1041; 13.46 s | 978; 1.80 m | 775; 13.71 m | 992; 23.88 s | 798; 5.83 m | 674; 40.36 m | 826; 2:19.82 |
| 19 | Marisa De Aniceto (FRA) | 6030 | 1015; 13.74 s | 867; 1.71 m | 733; 13.09 m | 863; 25.26 s | 777; 5.76 m | 899; 51.98 m | 876; 2:16.20 |
| 20 | Györgyi Farkas (HUN) | 6013 | 932; 14.33 s | 978; 1.80 m | 764; 13.55 m | 822; 25.72 s | 871; 6.07 m | 793; 46.52 m | 853; 2:17.83 |
| 21 | Grit Šadeiko (EST) | 6013 | 1050; 13.50 s | 903; 1.74 m | 690; 12.43 m | 957; 24.25 s | 883; 6.11 m | 747; 44.12 m | 783; 2:23.01 |
| 22 | Sofia Ifadidou (GRE) | 5947 | 1004; 13.82 s | 830; 1.68 m | 725; 12.96 m | 805; 25.91 s | 792; 5.81 m | 995; 56.96 m ^{♦} | 796; 2:22.03 |
| 23 | Ivona Dadic (AUT) | 5935 | 898; 14.58 s | 978; 1.80 m | 674; 12.19 m | 953; 24.29 s | 850; 6.00 m | 702; 41.82 m | 880; 2:15.90 |
| 24 | Sarah Cowley (NZL) | 5873 | 985; 13.95 s | 978; 1.80 m | 686; 12.37 m | 833; 25.60 s | 850; 6.00 m | 704; 41.90 m | 837; 2:19.01 |
| 25 | Louise Hazel (GBR) | 5856 | 1053; 13.48 s | 724; 1.59 m | 715; 12.81 m | 935; 24.48 s | 780; 5.77 m | 809; 47.38 m | 840; 2:18.78 |
| 26 | Ida Marcussen (NOR) | 5846 | 967; 14.08 s | 830; 1.68 m | 811; 14.26 m | 873; 25.15 s | 795; 5.82 m | 711; 42.26 m | 912; 2:13.62 |
| 27 | Chantae McMillan (USA) | 5688 | 1052; 13.49 s | 830; 1.68 m | 856; 14.92 m | 864; 25.25 s | 663; 5.37 m | 856; 49.78 m | 567; 2:40.55 |
| 28 | Jennifer Oeser (GER) | 5455 | 1062; 13.42 s | 978; 1.80 m | 805; 14.16 m | 944; 24.39 s | 871; 6.07 m | 795; 46.61 m | 0 DNF |
| 29 | Julia Mächtig (GER) | 5338 | 903; 14.54 s | 830; 1.68 m | 860; 14.99 m | 852; 25.38 s | 322; 4.06 m | 752; 44.40 m | 819; 2:20.34 |
| 30 | Irina Karpova (KAZ) | 5319 | 949; 14.21 s | 830; 1.68 m | 640; 11.68 m | 849; 25.42 s | 759; 5.70 m | 586; 35.75 m | 706; 2:28.93 |
| — | Hyleas Fountain (USA) | DNF | 1170; 12.70 s | 1054; 1.86 m | 660; 11.99 m | 1016; 23.64 s | 865; 6.05 m | 319; 21.60 m | DNS |
| — | Uhunoma Osazuwa (NGR) | DNF | 1056; 13.46 s | 941; 1.77 m | 712; 12.77 m | 922; 24.62 s | 771; 5.74 m | DNS | DNS |
| — | Karolina Tymińska (POL) | DNF | 1091; 13.22 s | 830; 1.68 m | 777; 13.74 m | 1009; 23.71 s | NM | DNS | DNS |
| — | Nataliya Dobrynska (UKR) | DNF | 1040; 13.57 s | 1016; 1.83 m | 864; 15.05 m | 915; 24.69 s | 242; 3.70 m | DNS | DNS |
| — | Sara Aerts (BEL) | DNF | 1133; 12.94 s | 795; 1.65 m | 823; 14.43 m | DNF | DNS | DNS | DNS |
| — | Aiga Grabuste (LAT) | DNF | 1028; 13.65 s | 941; 1.77 m | 762; 13.52 m | DNS | DNS | DNS | DNS |
| — | Margaret Simpson (GHA) | DNS | DNS | DNS | DNS | DNS | DNS | DNS | DNS |
| DQ | Tatyana Chernova (RUS) | DQ; ~~6628~~ | 1053; 13.48 s | 978; 1.80 m | 805; 14.17 m | 1013; 23.67 s | 1020; 6.54 m^{♦} | 788; 46.29 m | 971; 2:09.56 |
| DQ | Lyudmyla Yosypenko (UKR) | DQ; ~~6618~~ | 1087; 13.25 s | 1016; 1.83 m | 787; 13.90 m | 1012; 23.68 s | 946; 6.31 m | 853; 49.63 m | 917; 2:13.28 |
