= Jana Korešová =

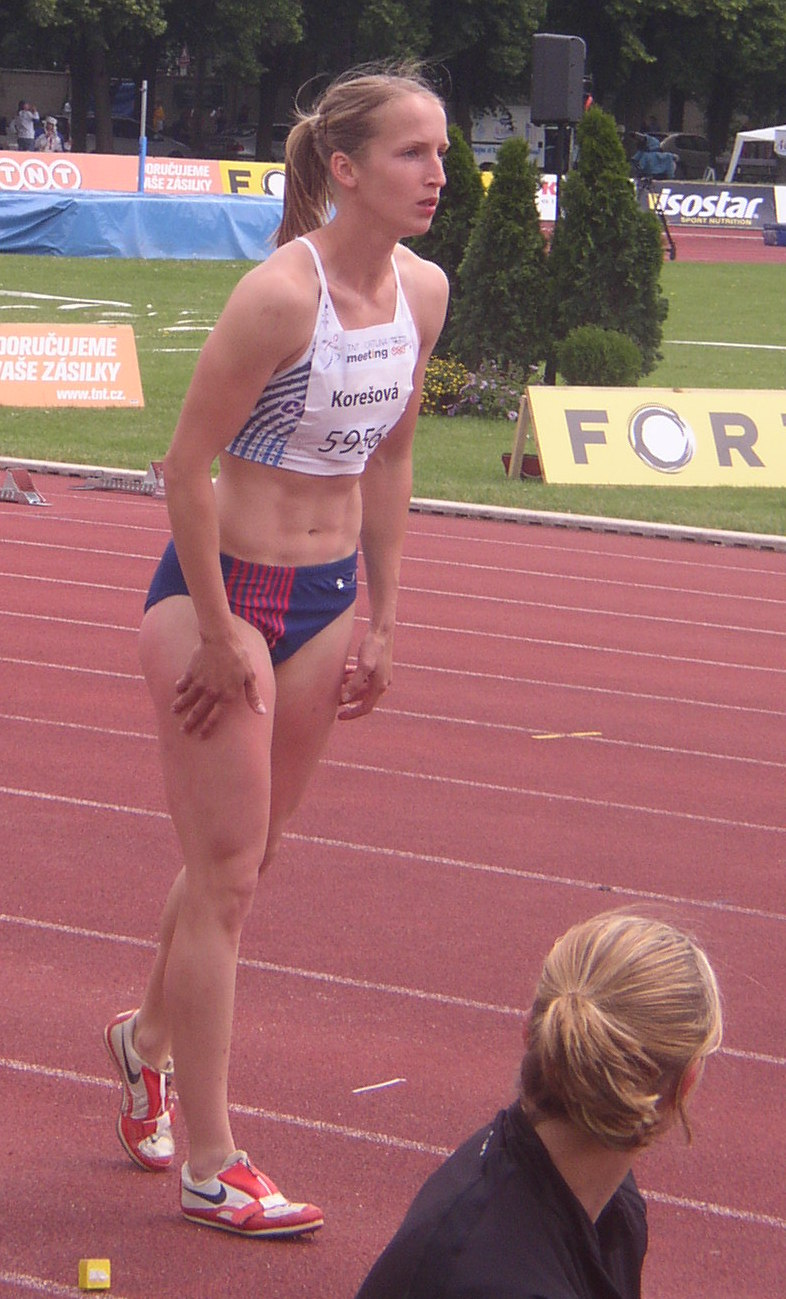
- Korešová in 2010

Personal information
- Born: 8 April 1981 (age 45) Prague, Czech Republic

Sport
- Country: Czech Republic
- Sport: Track and field
- Event: Heptathlon
Medal record
Track and field
Representing Czech Republic
Summer Universiade
Silver medal – second place	2009 Belgrade	Heptathlon

Jana Korešová (born 8 April 1981) is a Czech former track and field athlete who competed in the heptathlon and long jump at international elite competitions. She is a Summer Universiade silver medalist in the heptathlon and a 12-time Czech champion in the long jump and pentathlon.
