= Angus Ross (bobsleigh) =

New Zealand bobsledder (born 1968)

Personal information
- Full name: Andrew Angus Ross
- Born: 4 October 1968 (age 57) Christchurch, New Zealand
- Spouse: Sarah Cowley
- Relative: Garrick Cowley (brother-in-law)

Sport
- Country: New Zealand
- Sport: Bobsleigh

Andrew Angus Ross (born 4 October 1968) is a New Zealand bobsledder. He competed at the 1998 Winter Olympics and the 2002 Winter Olympics.
