= Teina Teiti =

Cook Island sprinter

Teina Teiti (born 2 April 1983) is a sprint athlete, who competed for the Cook Islands.

Teiti was just 17 years old when he competed in the 100 metres at the 2000 Summer Olympics. He ran a time off 11.22 seconds and finished 7th in his heat, failing to qualify for the next round.

He competed in the 2000 Oceania Youth Athletics Championships.
