= Tatyana Chernova =

Russian heptathlete (born 1988)

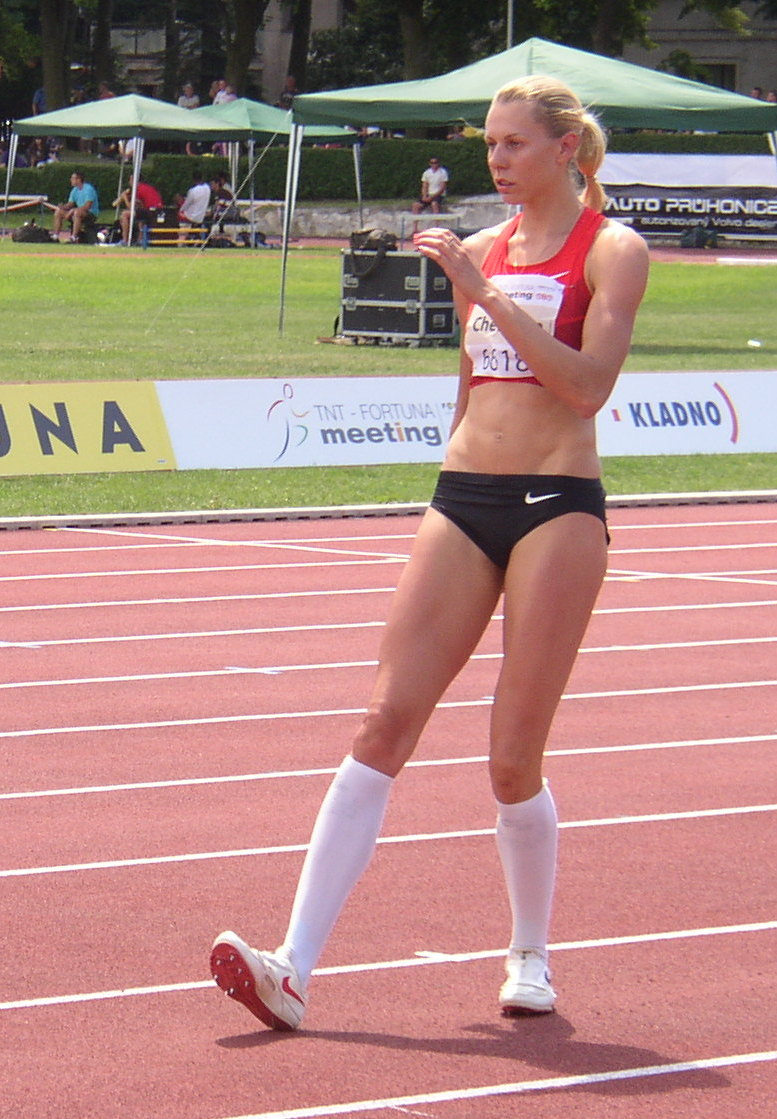
- Chernova in 2011

Personal information
- Nationality: Russian
- Born: 29 January 1988 (age 38) Krasnodar, Russian SFSR, Soviet Union
- Height: 1.89 m (6 ft 2 1/2 in)
- Weight: 63 kg (139 lb)

Sport
- Sport: Heptathlon
Medal record
Representing Russia
Olympic Games
Disqualified	2008 Beijing	Heptathlon
Disqualified	2012 London	Heptathlon
World Championships
Disqualified	2011 Daegu	Heptathlon
World Indoor Championships
Disqualified	2010 Doha	Pentathlon
Universiade
Disqualified	2013 Kazan	Heptathlon

Tatyana Sergeyevna Chernova (Russian: Татьяна Серге́евна Чернова; born 29 January 1988 in Krasnodar) is a Russian former heptathlete.

She was originally awarded the bronze medals at the 2008 and 2012 Summer Olympics before being stripped of them for doping. A serial offender, all of her athletics results from 17 August 2008 to 5 February 2016 were disqualified due to doping.

== Career ==
Chernova showed her promise in combined events at a young age and won gold medals at the 2005 World Youth Championships in Athletics and the 2006 World Junior Championships in Athletics. In 2007 she scored a total of 6768 points – the highest score ever reached by a junior, although it is classed as wind-assisted for record purposes. In her senior global debut at the 2007 World Championships in Athletics she failed to finish the competition.

Chernova rebounded the following year at the 2008 IAAF World Indoor Championships, where she was seventh in the women's pentathlon. Later that summer she won the Hypo-Meeting with a personal best score of 6618 points and managed a performance of 6591 points at the 2008 Summer Olympics. She originally finished fourth, but following the disqualification of Lyudmyla Blonska for doping, she was upgraded to the bronze medal, her first major senior medal. She failed to build upon this in 2009 and ended the year with a season's best of 6386 points, having finished eighth at the 2009 World Championships in Athletics.

At the start of the 2010 season, she was originally awarded the bronze medal in the pentathlon at the 2010 IAAF World Indoor Championships, finishing behind Jessica Ennis and Nataliya Dobrynska. Chernova represented Russia at the 2010 European Athletics Championships and finished fourth in the heptathlon with 6512 points. She was the winner of the 2010 Décastar event, recording 6453 points, and this moved her into first place in the IAAF Combined Events Challenge rankings.

Chernova began the 2011 season with a personal best of 6773 points at the TNT – Fortuna Meeting. This was a meeting record and represented an improvement of more than 150 points over her previous best. She ran a personal best in the 100 metres hurdles (13.32 seconds), but her consistency over all seven events was the reason for the improvement.

Prior to the 2011 World Championships in Athletics, it was reigning champion Jessica Ennis who was ranked number one that year, followed by Chernova. At the championships in Daegu, Chernova equalled her bests in the 200 metres and the 100 m hurdles, and set an outright best in the shot put. On the final day, a strong performance in the javelin throw (52.95 m) helped Chernova overhaul and establish a significant lead over second place Ennis. She finished third in the 800 metres final, but still maintained her lead and initially became the heptathlon world champion with a personal best total of 6880 points. Chernova won the Decastar Meeting a month later to take a consecutive series win on the IAAF Challenge circuit, having amassed 20,332 points over three competitions.

== Doping ==
After retesting of samples from the 2009 IAAF World Championships, Chernova was found to have been doping. Her results from 15 August 2009 to 14 August 2011 were annulled, and she was suspended for two years from 22 July 2013. On March 25, 2015, the IAAF filed an appeal with the Court of Arbitration in Lausanne, Switzerland, questioning the selective disqualification of the suspension periods of six other athletes disqualified around the same time. Chernova's case also involved strange gaps in her suspension periods, including opening up her eligibility two weeks before the World Championship gold medal and initiating another disqualification period less than two weeks after she won the Universiade gold medal.

On 29 November 2016, it was announced that she had been further disqualified from all results between 15 August 2011 and 22 July 2013, including her 2011 World Championships gold and 2012 Olympics bronze.

On 24 April 2017, Chernova was disqualified and stripped of her bronze medal at the 2008 Summer Olympics due to doping. This meant that she no longer had medals from any major championships.

== Achievements ==
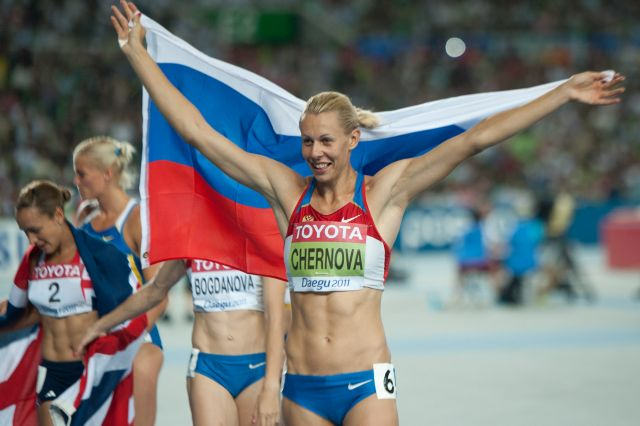
Chernova at the 2011 World Championships in Athletics

Year	Competition	Venue	Position	Event	Notes
Representing Russia
2005	World Youth Championships	Marrakesh, Morocco	1st	Heptathlon	5875 pts
2006	World Junior Championships	Beijing, China	1st	Heptathlon	6227 pts
2007	World Championships	Osaka, Japan	—	Heptathlon	DNF
2008	World Indoor Championships	Valencia, Spain	7th	Pentathlon	4543 pts
2008	Hypo-Meeting	Götzis, Austria	1st	Heptathlon	6618 pts PB
2008	Olympic Games	Beijing, China	DSQ (3rd)	Heptathlon	
2009	Hypo-Meeting	Götzis, Austria	7th	Heptathlon	6243 pts
2009	World Championships	Berlin, Germany	DSQ (8th)	Heptathlon	
2010	World Indoor Championships	Doha, Qatar	DSQ (3rd)	Pentathlon	
2010	European Championships	Barcelona, Spain	DSQ (4th)	Heptathlon	
2011	World Championships	Daegu, South Korea	DSQ (1st)	Heptathlon	~~6880 pts PB~~
2012	Olympic Games	London, United Kingdom	DSQ (3rd)	Heptathlon	
2013	Universiade	Kazan, Russia	DSQ (1st)	Heptathlon	
