= Kelly Sotherton =

British heptathlete (born 1976)

Kelly Sotherton MBE
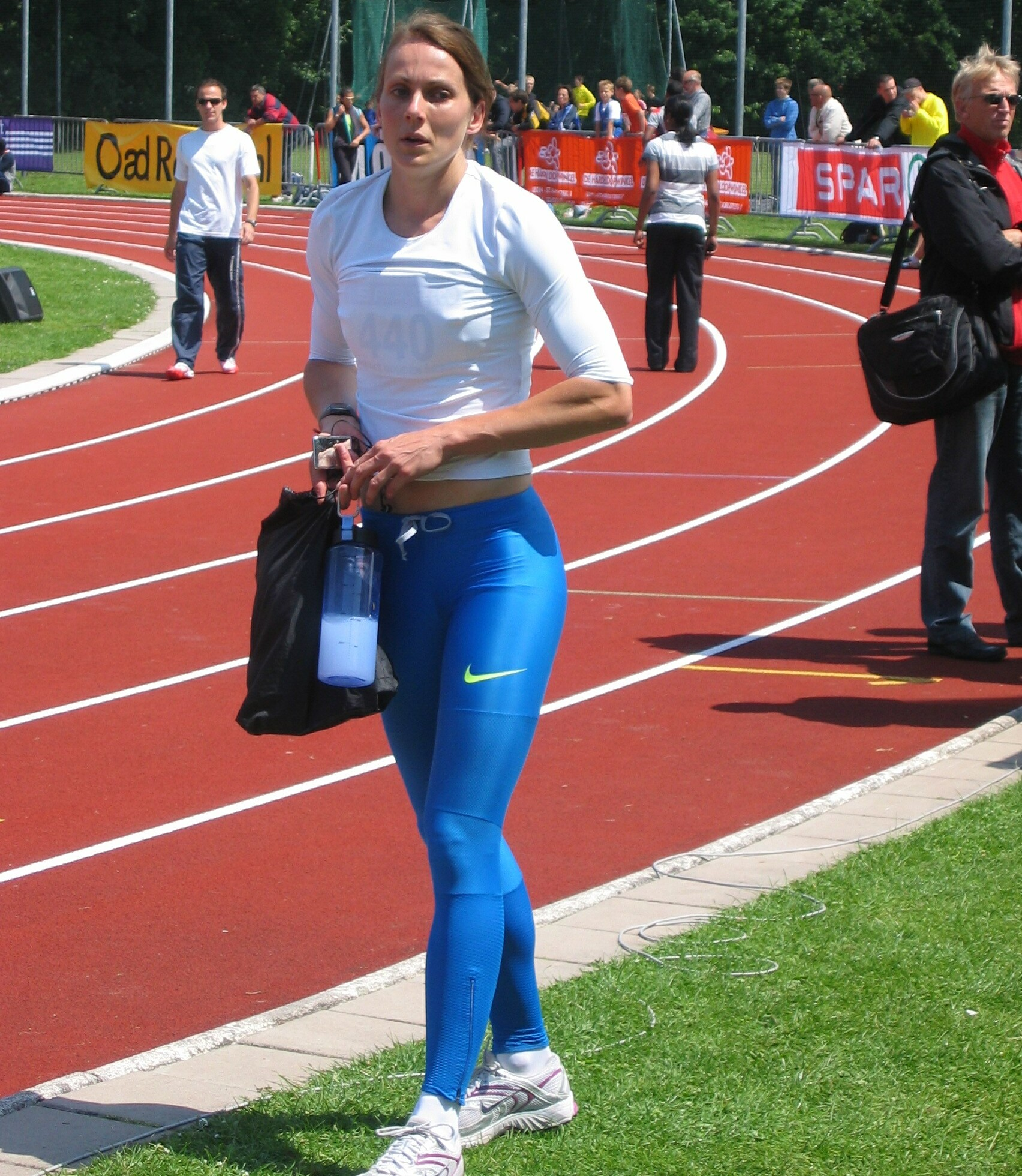

Personal information
- Full name: Kelly Jade Sotherton
- Nationality: United Kingdom
- Born: 13 November 1976 (age 49) Newport, Isle of Wight
- Height: 178 cm (5 ft 10 in)
- Weight: 68 kg (150 lb)

Sport
- Country: United Kingdom
- Sport: Athletics
- Event(s): Heptathlon; Long Jump; 400 m
- Club: Birchfield Harriers
- Coached by: Aston Moore, Charles Van Commenee

Achievements and titles
- Olympic finals: 3rd (2004) 3rd (2008)- hept 3rd (2008)- 4 × 400 m
- World finals: 5th (2005)3rd (2007)2nd (2008)
- Regional finals: 7th (2006) 2nd (2005/2007)
- Highest world ranking: 1 (Mar 2006)
Medal record
Women's athletics
Representing Great Britain
Olympic Games
Bronze medal – third place	2004 Athens	Heptathlon
Bronze medal – third place	2008 Beijing	Heptathlon
Bronze medal – third place	2008 Beijing	4 × 400 m relay
World Championships
Bronze medal – third place	2007 Osaka	Heptathlon
World Indoor Championships
Silver medal – second place	2008 Valencia	Pentathlon
European Indoor Championships
Silver medal – second place	2005 Madrid	Pentathlon
Silver medal – second place	2007 Birmingham	Pentathlon
Silver medal – second place	2011 Paris	4 × 400 m relay
Representing England
Commonwealth Games
Gold medal – first place	2006 Melbourne	Heptathlon
Representing Isle of Wight
Island Games
Gold medal – first place	1997 Jersey	100 m
Gold medal – first place	1997 Jersey	100 m Hurdles
Gold medal – first place	1997 Jersey	Long Jump
Gold medal – first place	1997 Jersey	High Jump
Gold medal – first place	1997 Jersey	4 × 100 m Relay
Gold medal – first place	1997 Jersey	4 × 400 m Relay
Gold medal – first place	1999 Gotland	100 m
Gold medal – first place	1999 Gotland	Long Jump
Silver medal – second place	1999 Gotland	200 m
Bronze medal – third place	1999 Gotland	4 × 100 m Relay
Bronze medal – third place	1999 Gotland	4 × 400 m Relay

Kelly Jade Sotherton MBE (born 13 November 1976) is a British former heptathlete, long jumper and relay runner. In the heptathlon she was the bronze medallist at the 2004 Summer Olympics and, following the disqualification of two other athletes, also at the 2008 Summer Olympics, as well as being part of the bronze medal-winning team in the Women's 4 × 400 m relay at the 2008 Summer Olympics (again, initially finishing 5th but upgraded after various subsequent doping disqualifications). As such she is one of only five women to win multiple medals in Olympic heptathlon. She also won a bronze at the 2007 World Championships in Athletics. Representing England, Sotherton is a one-time Commonwealth Games champion, as the heptathlon gold medallist at the 2006 Commonwealth Games.

Indoors, Sotherton was a World silver medallist, and twice European silver medallist in pentathlon, in which she was ranked seventh all-time in 2022.

Several of Sotherton's medals arrived after other athletes had been caught doping - at the time, Sotherton's reputation was more of near misses than medal success. As the scale of her accomplishments at global level (5 global medals in four years) became clear in hindsight, Sotherton was increasingly recognised as fully part of a notable line of world class British pentathletes/heptathletes that included Olympic gold medalists Mary Rand, Mary Peters, Commonwealth Games champions Judy Simpson, and Louise Hazel and three modern champions across multiple events, Denise Lewis (Olympic, double-Commonwealth gold), Jessica Ennis-Hill (Olympic, European and triple-World gold) and Katarina Johnson-Thompson (double-World, double-Commonwealth gold), her multiple global medals and Commonwealth title between 2004 and 2008 bridging the gap between the Olympic triumphs of Lewis and Ennis-Hill.

In November 2010, she announced her decision to retire from the heptathlon, due to foot and back injuries. After considering switching to cycling, she then chose instead to focus on the 400 m winning her only National title in 2011. Sotherton's funding from UK Athletics was cut in 2011, but while she returned to heptathlon training, she failed to qualify for the 2012 Summer Olympics ahead of reigning Commonwealth champion Louise Hazel, World (and eventual Olympic) champion Ennis Hill or future World and Commonwealth champion Katarina Johnson-Thompson and Sotherton retired from elite competitive athletics for the final time shortly thereafter.

== Early life and education ==
Sotherton was born in Newport, Isle of Wight on 13 November 1976. She began her athletics career in the sports day at Caversham House Primary School in Ryde, Isle of Wight. She was subsequently educated at Bishop Lovett Middle School, Ryde High School and Brunel University.

== Career ==
As a teenager, Sotherton played netball for the Isle of Wight, and won two English Schools' championships in the heptathlon. She moved to the Midlands in 1998, to become a member of Birchfield Harriers athletics club. She made her senior British team debut in 2002.

=== 2004 ===
She gained international recognition in 2004 when she unexpectedly won a bronze medal at the Summer Olympics in Athens behind Carolina Klüft (gold) and Austra Skujytė (silver), scoring 6424 points and finishing ahead of defending Olympic champion Lewis, who dropped out due to injury.

She was famously criticised for settling for the bronze medal instead of chasing the silver in the final event, the 800 m, by her coach Charles van Commenee.

=== 2005 ===
In March 2005 she competed in the European Indoor Championships, where she took silver once again behind Klüft. At Götzis, Austria in May Sotherton was again beaten into second, behind the Swede, but she did record a personal best of 6547 points. At the AAA's National Championship in July, Sotherton competed in four individual events and took her first senior national title, winning the long jump with a jump of 6.48 metres.

At the 2005 World Championships Sotherton had held a medal position going into the sixth event, despite some below average performances, but a disastrous javelin saw her drop out of contention. Sotherton did manage to knock nearly 2.5 seconds off her personal best to win the final 800 m, but despite closing the overall gap on those ahead she only finished fifth.

=== 2006 ===
In March 2006 Sotherton competed for England in the heptathlon at the Commonwealth Games in Melbourne. She took gold with a score of 6396, ahead of Kylie Wheeler of Australia (silver) and her teammate Jessica Ennis (bronze). In August 2006 she competed for Great Britain and Northern Ireland in the heptathlon at the 2006 European Athletics Championships in Gothenburg. She came seventh ahead of her teammate Jessica Ennis, after a disappointing javelin event caused her to drop from second.

=== 2007 ===
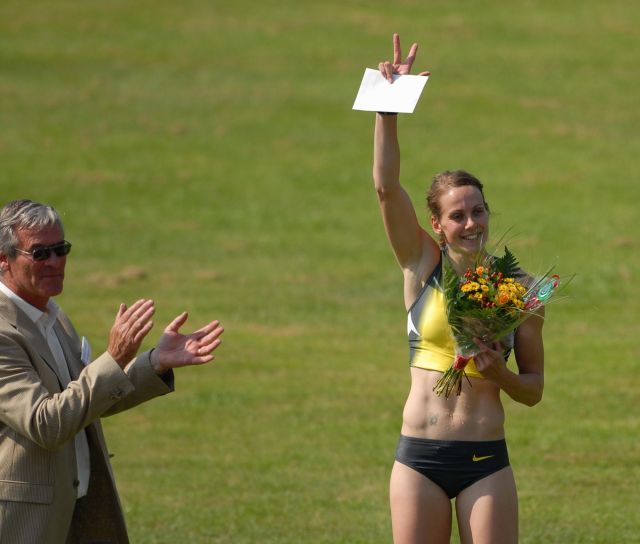
Kelly Sotherton at an athletics meeting in The Netherlands, 2007

2007 saw Great Britain host the European Indoor Championships, in Birmingham. Klüft led after the hurdles, but Sotherton and compatriot Jessica Ennis trailed closely behind. The high jump saw Ennis take the lead over Klüft and Sotherton, with a jump of 1.91, but Sotherton set a personal best for indoors of 1.88. Seven points separated Klüft and Sotherton. In the shot put, Sotherton took a two-point lead ahead of defending champion Klüft. The long jump saw Klüft take a 24-point lead over the Briton. In the 800 m, a strong event for Sotherton, she needed to take 1.6 seconds from Klüft to see her beaten for the first time since 2002. Sotherton set a personal best 2:12.54, but Klüft also underscored her previous mark to win by 17 points. This was her smallest winning margin ever. Sotherton took silver, and Karin Ruckstuhl the bronze. In one of the best pentathlons of all time, many athletes set national records and Klüft and Sotherton rose to second and fourth on the all-time lists respectively. Sotherton also set a Commonwealth record by 200 points.

In 2007, the World Championships were held in the Japanese city of Osaka. Sotherton started the first day with a personal best of 13.21 seconds in the 100 metres hurdles. She then came within a centimetre of her personal best in the high jump with a 1.86 m performance. A season's best of 14.14 m followed in the shot put and Sotherton ended the day with a second personal best in the 200 m, with 23.40. On the second day, Sotherton hit 6.68 m in the long jump, to stay in medal contention, but again the javelin saw a weak performance, with Sotherton throwing just 31.90, finishing last. However, Sotherton put in a strong performance in the 800 m, running 2:11.58 to just beat teammate Jessica Ennis to the bronze medal, with 6,510 points.

Event	Result	Position	Points	Overall Position	Extra
100 metres hurdles	13.21 secs (PB)	3rd (PB)	1093	3rd
High jump	1.86 m	4th	1054	4th
Shot put	14.14 m (SB)	9th	803	3rd
200 metres	23.40 secs (PB)	3rd	1039	3rd
Long jump	6.68 m (PB)	3rd	1066	3rd
Javelin	31.90 m (SB)	32nd	513	4th
800 metres	2:11.58	3rd	942	3rd
Heptathlon			6510	3rd	Klüft set a European Record of 7,032 to win.

=== 2008–09 ===
In February 2008, Sotherton competed in a three-event triathlon, at the Indoor Grand Prix, in Birmingham, against a field including Carolina Klüft. Sotherton started with a below-par performance in the long jump, allowing Klüft to take the lead. Sotherton then won the 60 m hurdles in a personal best of 8.17 seconds. Despite running a personal best (and the fastest time by a Briton that season) of 52.47 seconds in the 400 m, Sotherton took second behind Klüft, who won by 18 points.

After Klüft pulled out of the World Indoor Championships in Valencia, Sotherton became favourite for the gold medal. She lived up to expectation in the 60 m hurdles, winning in 8.25 seconds. However, Sotherton put in a below-par performance in the high jump, achieving only 1.81 m, against Tia Hellebaut's 1.99 m., and Sotherton slipped to third and then to fifth after the shot put. Sotherton then won the long jump with 6.45 m, moving into second, behind Hellebaut, who set a Belgian record of 6.41 m. Hellebaut held a considerable lead entering the final event, the 800 m. Sotherton needed to beat the Belgian by 7.7 seconds to win gold. Sotherton set a personal best of 2:09.95, with Hellebaut collapsing over the line in 2:16.42, 6.47 seconds behind Sotherton, and the Briton had to again settle for silver.

After Klüft's retirement from heptathlon in 2008, Sotherton had been tipped by many people to take gold at the 2008 Olympics, including Klüft herself. However, after a disappointing performance she could only manage 5th place in the competition. Lyudmila Blonska was later disqualified for failing a doping test and Sotherton was upgraded to fourth. She had previously labelled Blonska a cheat, and questioned the validity of Blonska's silver medal at the World Championships in 2007. In December 2017 Tatyana Chernova was disqualified from 3rd place in the competition for doping, promoting Sotherton to the bronze medal. She was also part of the 4 × 400 m relay team which finished fifth in the final although the team was later upgraded to bronze medal position following disqualification for doping offences of the teams finishing in third and fourth place.

Sotherton received her bronze medal from the 4 × 400 metre relay at the London Anniversary Games on 21 July 2018 along with her teammates. She then received her second bronze medal from the Heptathlon two months later on 13 September at the Team GB ball in London.

The following year, Sotherton struggled with injuries and although she was selected for the 2009 European Indoor Championships she had to withdraw due to heel problems. Despite recovering from this injury, her 2010 season was also ruined by injury as her back problems recurred.

=== 2011 ===
Sotherton completed "the first step of her reinvention as a 400 m specialist", with a victory in the 400 m final in 53.46 sec, at the English Institute of Sport - Sheffield indoor arena on 13 February 2011. Overcome at her win, she explained a temporary breakdown at trackside; " When I prolapsed the disc in my back it was career-threatening. I had to make a decision whether to end my career or try something new." It was Sotherton's first national title in a track event.

=== 2012 ===
On Sunday 27 May 2012, Sotherton announced her retirement from the sport after failing to recover from back surgery in time for the London 2012 games.

== Post-retirement ==
Since retiring in 2012, Sotherton has been on UKsport international leaderships programme and ACGP (corporate governance practitioner). She appears in the media, commentating and guesting on various productions including those by Talksport and BBC Radio 5 Live, and undertakes public speaking engagements. She coaches and mentors in Athletics, and is part of the Sports People's Think Tank alongside footballer Jason Roberts.

She participated in the 2013 London Marathon in aid of Age UK, the Deloitte Ride Across Britain from Lands End to John O'Groats, the Prudential London Triathlon, and a marathon row for cancer research.

Sotherton was appointed Member of the Order of the British Empire (MBE) in the 2020 New Year Honours for services to track and field athletics and the promotion of women's sport.

Sotherton is a performance coach and specialises in running. She has worked with Wasps Rugby and Warwickshire CC. In February 2020, it was announced that Sotherton would lead the Athletics Team at the 2022 Birmingham Commonwealth Games, her home city.

== Personal bests ==
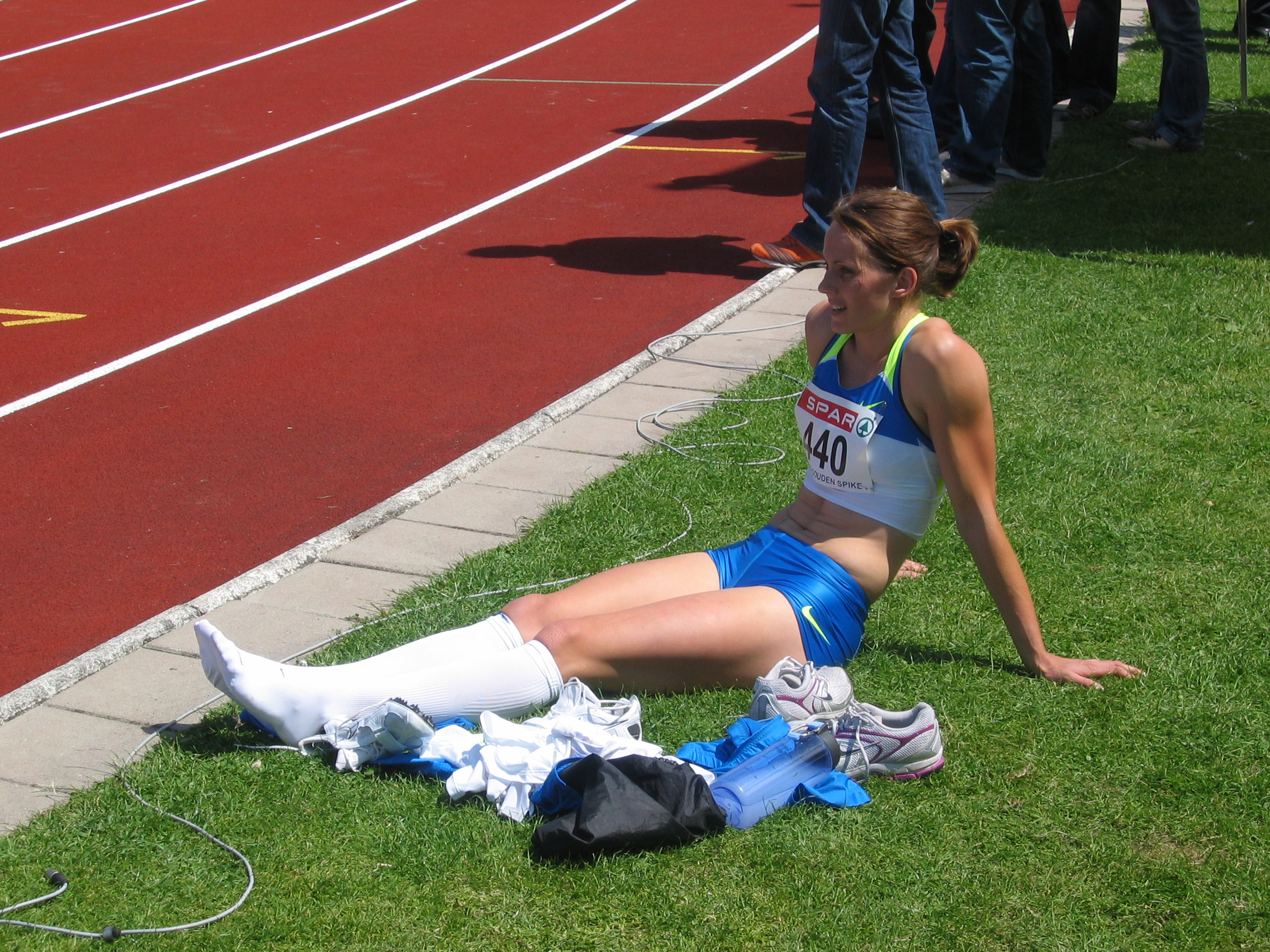

Event	Data
100 m	11.80 secs
200 m	23.39 secs
400 m	52.19 secs
800 m	2mins 07.34 secs
100 m hurdles	13.18 secs
High jump (indoor)	1.88 m
Long jump	6.79 m
Shot put	14.66 m
Javelin	40.81 m
Pentathlon (indoor)	4927 points
Heptathlon	6547 points

== International competitions ==
Year	Competition	Venue	Position	Event	Notes
Representing Isle of Wight
1997	Island Games	Jersey, Channel Islands	1st	100 m	GR (12.02 seconds)
1997	Island Games	Jersey, Channel Islands	1st	100 m hurdles	GR (14.39 seconds)
1997	Island Games	Jersey, Channel Islands	1st	Long jump	GR (5.84 m)
1997	Island Games	Jersey, Channel Islands	1st	High jump	1.70 m
1997	Island Games	Jersey, Channel Islands	1st	4 × 100 m relay	49.24 sec
1997	Island Games	Jersey, Channel Islands	1st	4 × 400 m relay	4 min 3.46 sec
1999	Island Games	Gotland, Sweden	1st	100 m	12.45 seconds
1999	Island Games	Gotland, Sweden	1st	Long jump	5.76 m
1999	Island Games	Gotland, Sweden	2nd	200 m	26.07 seconds
1999	Island Games	Gotland, Sweden	3rd	4 × 100 m relay	50.27 sec
1999	Island Games	Gotland, Sweden	3rd	4 × 400 m relay	4 min 6.44 sec
Representing Great Britain or England
1997	European U23 Championships	Turku, Finland	10th	Heptathlon	5585 pts
2002	Commonwealth Games	Manchester, England	7th	Heptathlon	5728 pts
2004	European Indoor Cup	Leipzig, Germany	4th	Long jump	6.38 m
2004	European Cup	Bydgoszcz, Poland	2nd	Long jump	6.68 m
2004	Summer Olympics	Athens, Greece	3rd	Heptathlon	6424 pts
2005	European Indoor Championship	Madrid, Spain	2nd	Pentathlon	4733 pts
2005	World Championships	Helsinki, Finland	7th	Long jump	6.42 m w
2005	World Championships	Helsinki, Finland	5th	Heptathlon	6325 pts
2006	Commonwealth Games	Melbourne, Australia	1st	Heptathlon	6396 pts
2006	European Cup	Málaga, Spain	4th	Long jump	6.50 m
2006	European Championships	Gothenburg, Sweden	7th	Heptathlon	6290 pts
2006	European Championships	Gothenburg, Sweden	15th (qualifiers)	Long jump	6.40 m
2006	World Athletics Final	Stuttgart, Germany	7th	Long jump	5.85 m
2007	European Indoor Championships	Birmingham, United Kingdom	2nd	Pentathlon	4927 pts
2007	World Championships	Osaka, Japan	3rd	Heptathlon	6510 pts
2008	World Indoor Championships	Valencia, Spain	2nd	Pentathlon	4852 pts
2008	Summer Olympics	Beijing, China	3rd	Heptathlon	6517 pts
2008	Summer Olympics	Beijing, China	3rd	4 × 400 m relay	3:22.68
