= 2006 European Athletics Championships – Women's heptathlon =

Women's heptathlon at the European Athletics Championships

The women's heptathlon at the 2006 European Athletics Championships were held at the Ullevi on August 7 and August 8.

Biggest drama occurred on the first day as Eunice Barber, who was leading after high jump, had to stop because of injury. After that no one could challenge Klüft, who took first gold medal for hosts. Battle for silver was exciting to the end. Schwarzkopf was better than Ruckstuhl in 800 metres, but not enough.

== Medalists ==
| Gold | Silver | Bronze |
|---|---|---|
| Carolina Klüft; Sweden | Karin Ruckstuhl; Netherlands | Lilli Schwarzkopf; Germany |

== Schedule ==
| Date | Time | Round |
|---|---|---|
| August 7, 2006 | 10:10 | 100 metres hurdles |
| August 7, 2006 | 11:15 | High jump |
| August 7, 2006 | 17:30 | Shot put |
| August 7, 2006 | 19:40 | 200 metres |
| August 8, 2006 | 11:35 | Long jump |
| August 8, 2006 | 16:35 | Javelin throw |
| August 8, 2006 | 19:55 | 800 metres |
| August 8, 2006 | | Final standings |

== Results ==
=== 100 metres hurdles ===
| Rank | Heat | Athlete | Nationality | Time | Points | Notes |
|---|---|---|---|---|---|---|
| 1 | 1 | Eunice Barber | France | 13.11 | 1108 | |
| 2 | 1 | Karin Ruckstuhl | Netherlands | 13.17 | 1099 | PB |
| 3 | 1 | Kelly Sotherton | United Kingdom | 13.22 | 1091 | PB |
| 4 | 1 | Jessica Ennis | United Kingdom | 13.33 | 1075 | |
| 5 | 1 | Carolina Klüft | Sweden | 13.35 | 1072 | |
| 6 | 1 | Louise Hazel | United Kingdom | 13.44 | 1059 | PB |
| 7 | 2 | Salla Käppi | Finland | 13.57 | 1040 | PB |
| 8 | 4 | Esenija Volžankina | Latvia | 13.58 | 1039 | |
| 9 | 4 | Denisa Ščerbová | Czech Republic | 13.59 | 1037 | |
| 10 | 1 | Vasilikí Delinikóla | Greece | 13.61 | 1034 | |
| 11 | 3 | Simone Oberer | Switzerland | 13.64 | 1030 | PB |
| 12 | 2 | Olga Levenkova | Russia | 13.65 | 1028 | |
| 12 | 2 | Jennifer Oeser | Germany | 13.65 | 1028 | PB |
| 12 | 2 | Lilli Schwarzkopf | Germany | 13.65 | 1028 | |
| 15 | 2 | Nataliya Dobrynska | Ukraine | 13.66 | 1027 | PB |
| 16 | 3 | Argiro Strataki | Greece | 13.68 | 1024 | PB |
| 17 | 2 | Hanna Melnychenko | Ukraine | 13.69 | 1023 | |
| 18 | 1 | Lyudmyla Blonska | Ukraine | 13.71 | 1020 | |
| 19 | 3 | Antoinette Nana Djimou Ida | France | 13.82 | 1004 | |
| 20 | 4 | Niina Kelo | Finland | 13.90 | 993 | SB |
| 21 | 2 | Elisa Trevisan | Italy | 13.92 | 990 | |
| 22 | 3 | Maija Kovalainen | Finland | 13.93 | 988 | SB |
| 23 | 3 | Yuliya Ignatkina | Russia | 13.95 | 985 | |
| 24 | 4 | Marie Collonvillé | France | 13.97 | 983 | SB |
| 25 | 2 | María Peinado | Spain | 14.10 | 964 | |
| 26 | 3 | Sylvie Dufour | Switzerland | 14.16 | 956 | |
| 27 | 4 | Kaie Kand | Estonia | 14.17 | 954 | |
| 28 | 4 | Svetlana Gnezdilov | Israel | 14.18 | 953 | |
| 29 | 4 | Natalya Roshchupkina | Russia | 14.43 | 918 | |
| 30 | 4 | Viktorija Žemaitytė | Lithuania | 14.59 | 897 | |
| | 3 | Karolina Tymińska | Poland | | | DNF |
| | 3 | Jessica Samuelsson | Sweden | | | DNS |

=== High jump ===
| Rank | Group | Athlete | Nationality | Result | Points | Notes |
|---|---|---|---|---|---|---|
| 1 | A | Carolina Klüft | Sweden | 1.89 | 1093 | |
| 2 | A | Eunice Barber | France | 1.89 | 1093 | |
| 3 | A | Nataliya Dobrynska | Ukraine | 1.86 | 1054 | PB |
| 4 | A | Jessica Ennis | United Kingdom | 1.86 | 1054 | |
| 5 | A | Jennifer Oeser | Germany | 1.86 | 1054 | PB |
| 6 | A | Karin Ruckstuhl | Netherlands | 1.83 | 1016 | SB |
| 7 | B | Viktorija Žemaitytė | Lithuania | 1.80 | 978 | |
| 8 | A | Lilli Schwarzkopf | Germany | 1.80 | 978 | |
| 9 | A | Yuliya Ignatkina | Russia | 1.80 | 978 | |
| 10 | A | Lyudmyla Blonska | Ukraine | 1.80 | 978 | |
| 11 | A | Simone Oberer | Switzerland | 1.80 | 978 | |
| 12 | A | Natalya Roshchupkina | Russia | 1.80 | 978 | |
| 12 | A | Marie Collonvillé | France | 1.80 | 978 | SB |
| 14 | A | Kelly Sotherton | United Kingdom | 1.77 | 941 | |
| 15 | B | Denisa Ščerbová | Czech Republic | 1.77 | 941 | |
| 16 | A | Hanna Melnychenko | Ukraine | 1.77 | 941 | |
| 17 | A | Olga Levenkova | Russia | 1.77 | 941 | |
| 18 | B | Argiro Strataki | Greece | 1.77 | 941 | |
| 19 | B | Kaie Kand | Estonia | 1.74 | 903 | |
| 19 | B | Sylvie Dufour | Switzerland | 1.74 | 903 | |
| 21 | A | Vasilikí Delinikóla | Greece | 1.74 | 903 | |
| 21 | B | Salla Käppi | Finland | 1.74 | 903 | SB |
| 23 | B | Maija Kovalainen | Finland | 1.74 | 903 | SB |
| 24 | B | Louise Hazel | United Kingdom | 1.71 | 867 | PB |
| 25 | B | Esenija Volžankina | Latvia | 1.68 | 830 | |
| 26 | B | Elisa Trevisan | Italy | 1.68 | 830 | |
| 27 | B | Antoinette Nana Djimou Ida | France | 1.65 | 795 | SB |
| 27 | B | Niina Kelo | Finland | 1.65 | 795 | |
| 29 | B | Svetlana Gnezdilov | Israel | 1.59 | 724 | |
| 30 | B | María Peinado | Spain | 1.56 | 689 | |
| | B | Karolina Tymińska | Poland | | | DNS |
| | B | Jessica Samuelsson | Sweden | | | DNS |

=== Shot put ===
| Rank | Group | Athlete | Nationality | Result | Points | Notes |
|---|---|---|---|---|---|---|
| 1 | A | Carolina Klüft | Sweden | 14.56 | 831 | |
| 2 | A | Maija Kovalainen | Finland | 14.51 | 828 | SB |
| 3 | A | Kelly Sotherton | United Kingdom | 14.27 | 812 | PB |
| 4 | A | Nataliya Dobrynska | Ukraine | 14.22 | 809 | |
| 5 | A | Niina Kelo | Finland | 14.20 | 807 | |
| 6 | A | Lilli Schwarzkopf | Germany | 14.05 | 797 | |
| 7 | A | Lyudmyla Blonska | Ukraine | 13.72 | 775 | |
| 8 | A | Olga Levenkova | Russia | 13.63 | 769 | |
| 9 | A | Jennifer Oeser | Germany | 13.57 | 765 | |
| 10 | B | Salla Käppi | Finland | 13.55 | 764 | PB |
| 11 | A | Yuliya Ignatkina | Russia | 13.38 | 753 | |
| 12 | A | Argiro Strataki | Greece | 13.28 | 746 | |
| 13 | A | Karin Ruckstuhl | Netherlands | 13.25 | 744 | |
| 14 | B | Vasilikí Delinikóla | Greece | 13.21 | 741 | PB |
| 15 | B | Viktorija Žemaitytė | Lithuania | 13.12 | 735 | |
| 16 | A | Natalya Roshchupkina | Russia | 13.04 | 730 | |
| 17 | A | Elisa Trevisan | Italy | 12.97 | 725 | |
| 18 | B | Sylvie Dufour | Switzerland | 12.94 | 723 | |
| 19 | B | Jessica Ennis | United Kingdom | 12.72 | 709 | PB |
| 20 | B | Antoinette Nana Djimou Ida | France | 12.65 | 704 | |
| 21 | B | Hanna Melnychenko | Ukraine | 12.45 | 691 | |
| 22 | B | Kaie Kand | Estonia | 12.37 | 686 | |
| 23 | A | María Peinado | Spain | 12.36 | 685 | |
| 24 | B | Marie Collonvillé | France | 12.09 | 667 | |
| 25 | B | Simone Oberer | Switzerland | 12.09 | 667 | |
| 26 | B | Svetlana Gnezdilov | Israel | 11.68 | 640 | |
| 27 | B | Esenija Volžankina | Latvia | 11.62 | 636 | |
| 28 | B | Louise Hazel | United Kingdom | 11.62 | 636 | |
| 29 | B | Denisa Ščerbová | Czech Republic | 10.74 | 578 | |
| | A | Karolina Tymińska | Poland | | | DNS |
| | B | Eunice Barber | France | | | DNS |
| | B | Jessica Samuelsson | Sweden | | | DNS |

=== 200 metres ===
| Rank | Heat | Athlete | Nationality | Time | Points | Notes |
|---|---|---|---|---|---|---|
| 1 | 4 | Jessica Ennis | United Kingdom | 23.56 | 1023 | PB |
| 2 | 4 | Kelly Sotherton | United Kingdom | 23.57 | 1022 | |
| 3 | 4 | Carolina Klüft | Sweden | 23.86 | 994 | |
| 4 | 4 | Denisa Ščerbová | Czech Republic | 23.94 | 986 | |
| 5 | 4 | Esenija Volžankina | Latvia | 24.07 | 974 | |
| 6 | 4 | Louise Hazel | United Kingdom | 24.12 | 969 | PB |
| 7 | 4 | Karin Ruckstuhl | Netherlands | 24.22 | 960 | |
| 8 | 3 | Hanna Melnychenko | Ukraine | 24.49 | 934 | PB |
| 9 | 4 | Lyudmyla Blonska | Ukraine | 24.61 | 923 | |
| 10 | 2 | Antoinette Nana Djimou Ida | France | 24.67 | 917 | SB |
| 11 | 3 | Olga Levenkova | Russia | 24.78 | 907 | |
| 12 | 3 | Argiro Strataki | Greece | 24.85 | 901 | |
| 13 | 3 | Natalya Roshchupkina | Russia | 24.86 | 900 | |
| 14 | 3 | Yuliya Ignatkina | Russia | 24.95 | 891 | |
| 15 | 2 | Nataliya Dobrynska | Ukraine | 24.96 | 890 | |
| 16 | 3 | Lilli Schwarzkopf | Germany | 24.99 | 888 | |
| 17 | 2 | Vasilikí Delinikóla | Greece | 25.05 | 882 | |
| 17 | 3 | Elisa Trevisan | Italy | 25.05 | 882 | |
| 19 | 2 | Jennifer Oeser | Germany | 25.10 | 878 | |
| 20 | 1 | Simone Oberer | Switzerland | 25.19 | 869 | SB |
| 21 | 2 | Viktorija Žemaitytė | Lithuania | 25.44 | 847 | |
| 22 | 1 | Svetlana Gnezdilov | Israel | 25.49 | 842 | |
| 23 | 1 | Maija Kovalainen | Finland | 25.51 | 841 | |
| 24 | 1 | Salla Käppi | Finland | 25.56 | 836 | SB |
| 25 | 1 | Sylvie Dufour | Switzerland | 25.63 | 830 | |
| 26 | 1 | Niina Kelo | Finland | 25.65 | 828 | PB |
| 27 | 2 | Kaie Kand | Estonia | 25.70 | 824 | |
| 28 | 1 | María Peinado | Spain | 25.96 | 801 | |
| | 2 | Marie Collonvillé | France | | | DNF |

=== Long jump ===
| Rank | Group | Athlete | Nationality | Result | Points | Notes |
|---|---|---|---|---|---|---|
| 1 | A | Carolina Klüft | Sweden | 6.65 | 1056 | |
| 2 | A | Kelly Sotherton | United Kingdom | 6.51 | 1010 | |
| 3 | A | Karin Ruckstuhl | Netherlands | 6.51 | 1010 | |
| 4 | A | Nataliya Dobrynska | Ukraine | 6.35 | 959 | |
| 5 | A | Esenija Volžankina | Latvia | 6.30 | 943 | |
| 6 | B | Jennifer Oeser | Germany | 6.28 | 937 | PB |
| 7 | A | Lyudmyla Blonska | Ukraine | 6.27 | 934 | |
| 8 | B | Maija Kovalainen | Finland | 6.25 | 927 | PB |
| 9 | A | Simone Oberer | Switzerland | 6.22 | 918 | |
| 10 | A | Argiro Strataki | Greece | 6.21 | 915 | |
| 11 | A | Yuliya Ignatkina | Russia | 6.19 | 908 | |
| 11 | B | Jessica Ennis | United Kingdom | 6.19 | 908 | SB |
| 13 | B | Lilli Schwarzkopf | Germany | 6.18 | 905 | |
| 14 | A | Olga Levenkova | Russia | 6.13 | 890 | |
| 15 | A | Denisa Ščerbová | Czech Republic | 6.12 | 887 | |
| 16 | B | Louise Hazel | United Kingdom | 6.05 | 865 | |
| 17 | B | Salla Käppi | Finland | 6.01 | 853 | SB |
| 18 | A | Hanna Melnychenko | Ukraine | 6.00 | 850 | |
| 18 | B | Elisa Trevisan | Italy | 6.00 | 850 | |
| 20 | B | Niina Kelo | Finland | 5.99 | 846 | PB |
| 21 | B | Natalya Roshchupkina | Russia | 5.84 | 801 | |
| 22 | B | María Peinado | Spain | 5.78 | 783 | |
| 23 | B | Antoinette Nana Djimou Ida | France | 5.76 | 777 | |
| 24 | B | Svetlana Gnezdilov | Israel | 5.76 | 777 | |
| 25 | B | Kaie Kand | Estonia | 5.67 | 750 | |
| 26 | B | Vasilikí Delinikóla | Greece | 5.66 | 747 | |
| 27 | B | Viktorija Žemaitytė | Lithuania | 5.56 | 717 | |
| 28 | A | Sylvie Dufour | Switzerland | 5.51 | 703 | |
| | A | Marie Collonvillé | France | | | DNS |

=== Javelin throw ===
| Rank | Group | Athlete | Nationality | Result | Points | Notes |
|---|---|---|---|---|---|---|
| 1 | B | Lilli Schwarzkopf | Germany | 51.36 | 886 | |
| 2 | B | Niina Kelo | Finland | 49.43 | 849 | |
| 3 | B | Jennifer Oeser | Germany | 48.52 | 831 | PB |
| 4 | B | Lyudmyla Blonska | Ukraine | 48.32 | 828 | PB |
| 5 | B | Carolina Klüft | Sweden | 46.94 | 801 | |
| 6 | B | Vasilikí Delinikóla | Greece | 43.83 | 741 | |
| 7 | B | Argiro Strataki | Greece | 43.65 | 737 | |
| 8 | A | Viktorija Žemaitytė | Lithuania | 43.45 | 734 | PB |
| 9 | B | Nataliya Dobrynska | Ukraine | 43.35 | 732 | |
| 10 | A | Natalya Roshchupkina | Russia | 43.05 | 726 | SB |
| 11 | B | Salla Käppi | Finland | 42.89 | 723 | |
| 12 | B | Antoinette Nana Djimou Ida | France | 42.82 | 721 | |
| 13 | B | Yuliya Ignatkina | Russia | 42.59 | 717 | |
| 14 | B | Maija Kovalainen | Finland | 42.19 | 709 | |
| 15 | B | Sylvie Dufour | Switzerland | 42.17 | 709 | |
| 16 | A | Esenija Volžankina | Latvia | 41.72 | 700 | |
| 17 | A | Simone Oberer | Switzerland | 40.38 | 675 | SB |
| 18 | B | Karin Ruckstuhl | Netherlands | 39.54 | 658 | |
| 19 | B | Elisa Trevisan | Italy | 39.38 | 655 | |
| 20 | A | Olga Levenkova | Russia | 39.22 | 652 | |
| 21 | A | Hanna Melnychenko | Ukraine | 39.13 | 651 | |
| 22 | A | Louise Hazel | United Kingdom | 38.60 | 640 | |
| 23 | A | Jessica Ennis | United Kingdom | 36.65 | 603 | SB |
| 24 | A | Svetlana Gnezdilov | Israel | 35.86 | 588 | SB |
| 25 | A | Kaie Kand | Estonia | 34.65 | 565 | |
| 26 | A | Kelly Sotherton | United Kingdom | 30.05 | 478 | |
| | A | Marie Collonvillé | France | | | DNS |
| | A | Denisa Ščerbová | Czech Republic | | | DNS |
| | B | María Peinado | Spain | | | DNS |

=== 800 metres ===
| Rank | Heat | Athlete | Nationality | Time | Points | Notes |
|---|---|---|---|---|---|---|
| 1 | 2 | Natalya Roshchupkina | Russia | 2:11.58 | 942 | |
| 2 | 3 | Lilli Schwarzkopf | Germany | 2:11.85 | 938 | |
| 3 | 3 | Karin Ruckstuhl | Netherlands | 2:11.97 | 936 | PB |
| 4 | 3 | Kelly Sotherton | United Kingdom | 2:11.98 | 936 | |
| 5 | 1 | Kaie Kand | Estonia | 2:12.30 | 931 | |
| 5 | 2 | Olga Levenkova | Russia | 2:12.30 | 931 | SB |
| 7 | 3 | Jessica Ennis | United Kingdom | 2:13.45 | 915 | |
| 8 | 2 | Simone Oberer | Switzerland | 2:13.81 | 910 | SB |
| 9 | 1 | Svetlana Gnezdilov | Israel | 2:14.00 | 907 | |
| 10 | 1 | Sylvie Dufour | Switzerland | 2:14.30 | 903 | SB |
| 11 | 3 | Lyudmyla Blonska | Ukraine | 2:14.55 | 899 | |
| 12 | 3 | Carolina Klüft | Sweden | 2:14.95 | 893 | |
| 13 | 3 | Nataliya Dobrynska | Ukraine | 2:15.57 | 885 | SB |
| 14 | 3 | Jennifer Oeser | Germany | 2:15.66 | 883 | |
| 15 | 3 | Argiro Strataki | Greece | 2:15.86 | 881 | |
| 16 | 1 | Louise Hazel | United Kingdom | 2:17.45 | 858 | PB |
| 17 | 2 | Esenija Volžankina | Latvia | 2:17.58 | 857 | PB |
| 18 | 2 | Hanna Melnychenko | Ukraine | 2:17.93 | 852 | PB |
| 19 | 1 | Antoinette Nana Djimou Ida | France | 2:18.30 | 847 | SB |
| 20 | 2 | Yuliya Ignatkina | Russia | 2:18.80 | 840 | |
| 21 | 2 | Niina Kelo | Finland | 2:18.92 | 838 | PB |
| 22 | 1 | Viktorija Žemaitytė | Lithuania | 2:22.76 | 786 | |
| 23 | 1 | Elisa Trevisan | Italy | 2:24.69 | 761 | |
| 24 | 1 | Vasilikí Delinikóla | Greece | 2:25.42 | 751 | |
| 25 | 2 | Salla Käppi | Finland | 2:27.09 | 730 | SB |
| 26 | 2 | Maija Kovalainen | Finland | 2:31.17 | 678 | |

=== Final standings ===
| Rank | Athlete | Nationality | Points | Notes |
|---|---|---|---|---|
| 1st place, gold medalist(s) | Carolina Klüft | Sweden | 6740 | CR |
| 2nd place, silver medalist(s) | Karin Ruckstuhl | Netherlands | 6423 | NR |
| 3rd place, bronze medalist(s) | Lilli Schwarzkopf | Germany | 6420 | PB |
| 4 | Jennifer Oeser | Germany | 6376 | PB |
| 5 | Lyudmyla Blonska | Ukraine | 6357 | |
| 6 | Nataliya Dobrynska | Ukraine | 6356 | SB |
| 7 | Kelly Sotherton | United Kingdom | 6290 | |
| 8 | Jessica Ennis | United Kingdom | 6287 | PB |
| 9 | Argiro Strataki | Greece | 6145 | |
| 10 | Olga Levenkova | Russia | 6118 | |
| 11 | Yuliya Ignatkina | Russia | 6072 | |
| 12 | Simone Oberer | Switzerland | 6047 | SB |
| 13 | Natalya Roshchupkina | Russia | 5995 | |
| 14 | Esenija Volžankina | Latvia | 5979 | |
| 15 | Niina Kelo | Finland | 5956 | PB |
| 16 | Hanna Melnychenko | Ukraine | 5942 | |
| 17 | Louise Hazel | United Kingdom | 5894 | PB |
| 18 | Maija Kovalainen | Finland | 5874 | PB |
| 19 | Salla Käppi | Finland | 5849 | PB |
| 20 | Vasilikí Delinikóla | Greece | 5799 | |
| 21 | Antoinette Nana Djimou Ida | France | 5765 | |
| 22 | Sylvie Dufour | Switzerland | 5727 | |
| 23 | Viktorija Žemaitytė | Lithuania | 5694 | |
| 24 | Elisa Trevisan | Italy | 5693 | |
| 25 | Kaie Kand | Estonia | 5613 | |
| 26 | Svetlana Gnezdilov | Israel | 5431 | |
| | Denisa Ščerbová | Czech Republic | | DNF |
| | María Peinado | Spain | | DNF |
| | Marie Collonvillé | France | | DNF |
| | Eunice Barber | France | | DNF |
| | Karolina Tymińska | Poland | | DNF |
| | Jessica Samuelsson | Sweden | | DNS |
