= 2003 European Athletics U23 Championships – Women's discus throw =

The women's discus throw event at the 2003 European Athletics U23 Championships was held in Bydgoszcz, Poland, at Zawisza Stadion on 19 and 20 July.

== Medalists ==
| Gold | Nataliya Fokina; Ukraine |
| Silver | Jana Tucholke; Germany |
| Bronze | Olga Chernogorova; Belarus |

== Results ==
=== Final ===
20 July

| Rank | Name | Nationality | Attempts | | | | | | Result | Notes |
| Rank | Name | Nationality | 1 | 2 | 3 | 4 | 5 | 6 | Result | Notes |
|---|---|---|---|---|---|---|---|---|---|---|
| 1st place, gold medalist(s) | Nataliya Fokina | Ukraine | 54.57 | x | 58.66 | 58.01 | 59.30 | x | 59.30 | CR |
| 2nd place, silver medalist(s) | Jana Tucholke | Germany | x | 56.11 | 57.90 | 58.24 | x | 57.81 | 58.24 | |
| 3rd place, bronze medalist(s) | Olga Chernogorova | Belarus | 56.05 | 54.20 | 56.57 | 54.00 | 54.59 | x | 56.57 | |
| 4 | Vera Begić | Croatia | 52.57 | x | 48.83 | 53.34 | x | 51.45 | 53.34 | |
| 5 | Laura Bordignon | Italy | 49.83 | 51.77 | 47.37 | 52.83 | x | 52.97 | 52.97 | |
| 6 | Dace Ruskule | Latvia | 51.24 | 52.31 | 49.67 | 49.04 | 46.02 | x | 52.31 | |
| 7 | Sabine Rumpf | Germany | 52.30 | 51.68 | 51.68 | 48.65 | 51.71 | 49.49 | 52.30 | |
| 8 | Claire Smithson | Great Britain | 50.26 | 51.97 | x | 51.26 | 47.86 | 49.07 | 51.97 | |
| 9 | Marija Kurtović | Croatia | 48.95 | 51.44 | x | | | | 51.44 | |
| 10 | Ildikó Varga | Hungary | 49.87 | 51.38 | 51.40 | | | | 51.40 | |
| 11 | Dragana Tomašević | Serbia and Montenegro | x | x | 51.27 | | | | 51.27 | |
| 12 | Hanna Golub | Belarus | x | x | 49.48 | | | | 49.48 | |

=== Qualifications ===
19 July
Qualifying 54.50 or 12 best to the Final

| Rank | Name | Nationality | Result | Notes |
|---|---|---|---|---|
| 1 | Jana Tucholke | Germany | 56.00 | Q |
| 2 | Nataliya Fokina | Ukraine | 54.65 | Q |
| 3 | Vera Begić | Croatia | 54.62 | Q |
| 4 | Olga Chernogorova | Belarus | 54.44 | q |
| 5 | Dragana Tomašević | Serbia and Montenegro | 54.44 | q |
| 6 | Dace Ruskule | Latvia | 53.12 | q |
| 7 | Laura Bordignon | Italy | 52.10 | q |
| 8 | Sabine Rumpf | Germany | 51.80 | q |
| 9 | Ildikó Varga | Hungary | 51.36 | q |
| 10 | Claire Smithson | Great Britain | 50.30 | q |
| 11 | Marija Kurtović | Croatia | 49.80 | q |
| 12 | Hanna Golub | Belarus | 49.77 | q |
| 13 | Agnieszka Krawczuk | Poland | 48.93 | |
| 14 | Volha Hancharenka | Belarus | 48.47 | |
| 15 | Katja Strandman | Finland | 46.52 | |
| 16 | Claudia Villeneuve | France | 45.53 | |
| 17 | Reetta Laitinen | Finland | 44.15 | |

== Participation ==
According to an unofficial count, 17 athletes from 12 countries participated in the event.

- Belarus (3)
- Croatia (2)
- Finland (2)
- France (1)
- Germany (2)
- Great Britain (1)
- Hungary (1)
- Italy (1)
- Latvia (1)
- Poland (1)
- Serbia and Montenegro (1)
- Ukraine (1)
