= Athletics at the 2002 Commonwealth Games – Women's heptathlon =

Women's heptathlon at the Commonwealth Games

The women's heptathlon event at the 2002 Commonwealth Games was held on 26–27 July.

== Medalists ==
Gold	Silver	Bronze
Jane Jamieson; Australia	Kylie Wheeler; Australia	Margaret Simpson; Ghana

== Results ==
=== 100 metres hurdles ===
Rank	Heat	Name	Nationality	Time	Points	Notes
1	2	Margaret Simpson	Ghana	13.81	1005	
2	1	Kerry Jury	England	13.82	1004	
3	1	Kelly Sotherton	England	13.89	994	
4	2	Kylie Wheeler	Australia	13.95	985	
5	1	Clare Thompson	Australia	14.05	971	
6	1	Julie Hollman	England	14.26	942	
7	2	Nicole Haynes	Canada	14.36	928	
8	2	Stéphanie Domaingue	Mauritius	14.43	918	
9	1	Jane Jamieson	Australia	14.44	917	
10	2	Kimberley Goodall	Guernsey	16.33	674	

=== High jump ===
Rank	Athlete	Nationality	1.44	1.47	1.50	1.53	1.56	1.59	1.62	1.65	1.68	1.71	1.74	1.77	1.80	1.83	1.86	1.89	Result	Points	Notes	Overall
1	Jane Jamieson	Australia	–	–	–	–	–	–	o	–	o	o	o	o	o	xo	xo	xxx	1.86	1054	PB	1971
2	Margaret Simpson	Ghana	–	–	–	–	–	–	–	o	xo	o	o	o	o	xxx			1.80	978	PB	1983
3	Julie Hollman	England	–	–	–	–	–	–	o	o	o	xo	o	o	xxx				1.77	941		1883
4	Kerry Jury	England	–	–	–	–	–	–	o	o	o	o	xxo	xo	xxx				1.77	941		1945
5	Kylie Wheeler	Australia	–	–	–	–	–	–	–	o	o	o	xo	xxo	xxx				1.77	941		1926
6	Clare Thompson	Australia	–	–	–	–	–	–	–	o	o	o	xo	xxx					1.74	903		1874
7	Nicole Haynes	Canada	–	–	–	–	–	–	o	o	o	o	xxx						1.71	867		1795
8	Kelly Sotherton	England	–	–	–	–	–	–	o	o	xxo	xo	xxx						1.71	867		1861
9	Stéphanie Domaingue	Mauritius	–	–	–	–	o	o	xxo	xxx									1.62	759		1677
10	Kimberley Goodall	Guernsey	o	o	o	xo	xxo	xxx											1.56	689	PB	1363

=== Shot put ===
Rank	Athlete	Nationality	#1	#2	#3	Result	Points	Notes	Overall
1	Jane Jamieson	Australia	13.73	13.67	13.69	13.73	776		2747
2	Nicole Haynes	Canada	13.63	x	x	13.63	769		2564
3	Clare Thompson	Australia	13.37	12.29	x	13.37	752	PB	2626
4	Kylie Wheeler	Australia	11.88	11.79	12.61	12.61	702	PB	2628
5	Kelly Sotherton	England	11.80	12.03	12.01	12.03	663		2524
6	Julie Hollman	England	11.78	x	11.64	11.78	647		2530
7	Margaret Simpson	Ghana	10.78	x	11.10	11.10	602		2585
8	Kerry Jury	England	10.35	x	10.68	10.68	574		2519
9	Stéphanie Domaingue	Mauritius	10.47	x	x	10.47	560	PB	2237
10	Kimberley Goodall	Guernsey	8.08	9.06	8.94	9.06	468		1831

=== 200 metres ===
Rank	Heat	Name	Nationality	Time	Points	Notes	Overall
1	2	Kelly Sotherton	England	23.83	997		3521
2	2	Kylie Wheeler	Australia	24.27	955		3583
3	2	Kerry Jury	England	24.64	920		3439
4	1	Margaret Simpson	Ghana	24.87	899		3484
5	2	Julie Hollman	England	24.97	890		3420
6	1	Jane Jamieson	Australia	25.13	875		3622
7	2	Clare Thompson	Australia	25.32	858		3484
8	1	Kimberley Goodall	Guernsey	25.54	838		2669
9	1	Nicole Haynes	Canada	25.59	833		3397
10	1	Stéphanie Domaingue	Mauritius	26.79	729		2966

=== Long jump ===
Rank	Athlete	Nationality	#1	#2	#3	Result	Points	Notes	Overall
1	Kylie Wheeler	Australia	6.18	x	6.13	6.18	905	PB	4488
2	Kelly Sotherton	England	5.93	6.06	6.07	6.07	871		4392
3	Julie Hollman	England	x	6.03	5.81	6.03	859		4279
4	Nicole Haynes	Canada	x	5.74	5.87	5.87	810		4207
5	Clare Thompson	Australia	5.85	5.76	x	5.85	804		4288
6	Jane Jamieson	Australia	5.52	5.84	5.78	5.84	801		4423
7	Margaret Simpson	Ghana	5.60	5.80	x	5.80	789		4273
8	Stéphanie Domaingue	Mauritius	5.78	5.58	5.47	5.78	783		3749
9	Kimberley Goodall	Guernsey	5.51	5.53	5.58	5.58	723		3392
10	Kerry Jury	England	5.29	5.42	5.49	5.49	697		4136

=== Javelin throw ===
Rank	Athlete	Nationality	#1	#2	#3	Result	Points	Notes	Overall
1	Jane Jamieson	Australia	47.37	48.01	46.41	48.01	822		5245
2	Margaret Simpson	Ghana	x	46.93	48.00	48.00	821		5094
3	Clare Thompson	Australia	44.04	43.08	x	44.04	745	PB	5033
4	Nicole Haynes	Canada	x	37.52	43.36	43.36	732		4939
5	Julie Hollman	England	38.56	39.54	35.55	39.54	658	PB	4937
6	Stéphanie Domaingue	Mauritius	36.89	x	34.98	36.89	608		4357
7	Kylie Wheeler	Australia	32.76	32.73	35.90	35.90	589	PB	5077
8	Kerry Jury	England	34.33	31.35	34.06	34.33	559		4695
9	Kimberley Goodall	Guernsey	26.31	32.00	29.56	32.00	515	PB	3907
10	Kelly Sotherton	England	27.69	26.82	27.35	27.69	433		4825

=== 800 metres ===
Rank	Name	Nationality	Time	Points	Notes
1	Kelly Sotherton	England	2:14.29	903	
2	Julie Hollman	England	2:15.31	888	
3	Kylie Wheeler	Australia	2:15.57	885	
4	Kimberley Goodall	Guernsey	2:16.11	877	
5	Kerry Jury	England	2:17.41	859	
6	Clare Thompson	Australia	2:19.24	834	
7	Nicole Haynes	Canada	2:20.68	814	
8	Jane Jamieson	Australia	2:20.72	814	
9	Margaret Simpson	Ghana	2:20.85	812	
10	Stéphanie Domaingue	Mauritius	2:26.37	739	

=== Final standings ===
The highest mark recorded in each event is highlighted in yellow

Rank	Athlete	Nationality	100m H	HJ	SP	200m	LJ	JT	800m	Points	Notes
1st place, gold medalist(s)	Jane Jamieson	Australia	14.44	1.86	13.73	25.13	5.84	48.01	2:20.72	6059	SB
2nd place, silver medalist(s)	Kylie Wheeler	Australia	13.95	1.77	12.61	24.27	6.18	35.90	2:15.57	5962	PB
3rd place, bronze medalist(s)	Margaret Simpson	Ghana	13.81	1.80	11.10	24.87	5.80	48.00	2:20.85	5906	
4	Clare Thompson	Australia	14.05	1.74	13.37	25.32	5.85	44.04	2:19.24	5867	SB
5	Julie Hollman	England	14.26	1.77	11.78	24.97	6.03	39.54	2:15.31	5825	
6	Nicole Haynes	Canada	14.36	1.71	13.63	25.59	5.87	43.36	2:20.68	5753	SB
7	Kelly Sotherton	England	13.89	1.71	12.03	23.83	6.07	27.69	2:14.29	5728	
8	Kerry Jury	England	13.82	1.77	10.68	24.64	5.49	34.33	2:17.41	5554	
9	Stéphanie Domaingue	Mauritius	14.43	1.62	10.47	26.79	5.78	36.89	2:26.37	5096	
10	Kimberley Goodall	Guernsey	16.33	1.56	9.06	25.54	5.58	32.00	2:16.11	4784	
