= 2000 World Junior Championships in Athletics – Women's discus throw =

The women's discus throw event at the 2000 World Junior Championships in Athletics was held in Santiago, Chile, at Estadio Nacional Julio Martínez Prádanos on 18 and 19 October.

== Medalists ==
Gold	Xu Shaoyang; China
Silver	Jana Tucholke; Germany
Bronze	Olga Goncharenko; Belarus

== Results ==
=== Final ===
19 October

Rank	Name	Nationality	Attempts						Result	Notes
Rank	Name	Nationality	1	2	3	4	5	6	Result	Notes
1st place, gold medalist(s)	Xu Shaoyang	China	52.98	48.73	50.48	52.67	51.98	54.41	54.41	
2nd place, silver medalist(s)	Jana Tucholke	Germany	x	44.79	50.18	49.72	53.97	53.10	53.97	
3rd place, bronze medalist(s)	Olga Goncharenko	Belarus	x	x	49.32	53.04	x	53.64	53.64	
4	Julia Bremser	Germany	51.69	52.09	48.42	51.11	x	53.06	53.06	
5	Vera Begić	Croatia	50.32	50.57	x	50.75	52.28	52.10	52.28	
6	Natalya Fokina	Ukraine	51.44	50.06	50.28	50.52	50.98	50.26	51.44	
7	Claire Smithson	United Kingdom	43.82	50.18	46.86	x	x	46.35	50.18	
8	Briona Reynolds	United States	46.05	47.88	41.32				47.88	
9	Deborah Lovely	Australia	x	47.34	x				47.34	
10	Ildikó Varga	Hungary	43.77	47.30	x				47.30	
11	Gheorghita Bosneaga	Romania	46.12	x	46.42				46.42	
	Seema Antil	India	52.52	51.15	53.28	x	54.14	55.27	DQ	IAAF rule 32.2

=== Qualifications ===
18 October

==== Group A ====
Rank	Name	Nationality	Attempts			Result	Notes
Rank	Name	Nationality	1	2	3	Result	Notes
1	Jana Tucholke	Germany	50.46	x	50.32	50.46	q
2	Briona Reynolds	United States	49.99	44.36	50.13	50.13	q
3	Xu Shaoyang	China	43.05	x	50.05	50.05	q
4	Deborah Lovely	Australia	49.04	47.76	45.72	49.04	q
5	Dace Ruskule	Latvia	47.98	45.13	47.60	47.98	
6	Emma Carpenter	United Kingdom	47.30	x	43.74	47.30	
7	Marija Kurtović	Croatia	43.33	47.27	44.37	47.27	
8	Laura Bordignon	Italy	46.88	46.26	44.88	46.88	
9	Agnete Johansen	Norway	45.89	46.09	45.97	46.09	
10	Claudia Villeneuve	France	45.12	45.96	45.74	45.96	
11	Fernanda Resende	Brazil	43.42	43.88	x	43.88	
	Seema Antil	India	50.65	54.83	-	DQ	IAAF rule 32.2 Q

==== Group B ====
Rank	Name	Nationality	Attempts			Result	Notes
Rank	Name	Nationality	1	2	3	Result	Notes
1	Olga Goncharenko	Belarus	x	53.26	-	53.26	Q
2	Vera Begić	Croatia	50.62	52.90	-	52.90	Q
3	Julia Bremser	Germany	51.64	-	-	51.64	Q
4	Natalya Fokina	Ukraine	50.08	50.55	51.10	51.10	Q
5	Gheorghita Bosneaga	Romania	x	44.90	48.95	48.95	q
6	Ildikó Varga	Hungary	45.46	48.55	45.99	48.55	q
7	Claire Smithson	United Kingdom	48.18	47.41	48.21	48.21	q
8	Ahu Sulak	Turkey	x	44.96	43.68	44.96	
9	Chafree Bain	Bahamas	41.53	x	x	41.53	
10	Renata de Figueiredo	Brazil	x	41.12	x	41.12	
11	Stacy Martin	United States	40.04	x	x	40.04	
12	Suzanne Kragbé	Côte d'Ivoire	x	39.29	x	39.29	

== Participation ==
According to an unofficial count, 24 athletes from 19 countries participated in the event.

- Australia (1)
- Bahamas (1)
- Belarus (1)
- Brazil (2)
- China (1)
- Côte d'Ivoire (1)
- Croatia (2)
- France (1)
- Germany (2)
- Hungary (1)
- India (1)
- Italy (1)
- Latvia (1)
- Norway (1)
- Romania (1)
- Turkey (1)
- Ukraine (1)
- United Kingdom (2)
- United States (2)
