= 1998 World Junior Championships in Athletics – Women's discus throw =

The women's discus throw event at the 1998 World Junior Championships in Athletics was held in Annecy, France, at Parc des Sports on 31 July and 1 August.

== Medalists ==
Gold	Liu Fengying; China
Silver	Mélina Robert-Michon; France
Bronze	Lăcrămioara Ionescu; Romania

== Results ==
=== Final ===
1 August

Rank	Name	Nationality	Attempts						Result	Notes
Rank	Name	Nationality	1	2	3	4	5	6	Result	Notes
1st place, gold medalist(s)	Liu Fengying	China	59.21	60.66	59.91	58.60	59.19	58.65	60.66	
2nd place, silver medalist(s)	Mélina Robert-Michon	France	51.90	53.47	x	55.01	x	x	55.01	
3rd place, bronze medalist(s)	Lăcrămioara Ionescu	Romania	53.87	52.55	52.92	52.81	54.64	50.89	54.64	
4	Ileana Brindusoiu	Romania	51.51	51.51	49.39	53.01	50.67	53.20	53.20	
5	Katja Kròl	Germany	50.93	53.17	52.90	51.16	x	47.05	53.17	
6	Anaelys Fernández	Cuba	51.61	52.27	51.17	49.78	x	50.85	52.27	
7	Olga Tarantayeva	Russia	x	51.88	50.81	51.58	x	x	51.88	
8	Mandy Borschowa	United States	37.32	40.43	49.97	42.91	x	x	49.97	
9	Katrina Steele	Australia	49.73	48.38	48.35				49.73	
10	Krista Keir	United States	49.14	46.01	x				49.14	
11	Debra Turnbull	Australia	48.04	47.58	x				48.04	
12	Vera Begić	Croatia	43.19	x	46.34				46.34	

=== Qualifications ===
31 Jul

==== Group A ====
Rank	Name	Nationality	Attempts			Result	Notes
Rank	Name	Nationality	1	2	3	Result	Notes
1	Katja Kròl	Germany	53.49	-	-	53.49	Q
2	Liu Fengying	China	x	52.11	-	52.11	Q
3	Olga Tarantayeva	Russia	51.86	-	-	51.86	Q
4	Ileana Brindusoiu	Romania	49.83	47.10	49.86	49.86	q
5	Mandy Borschowa	United States	x	x	49.84	49.84	q
6	Debra Turnbull	Australia	47.23	49.46	49.15	49.46	q
7	Vera Begić	Croatia	45.16	47.10	45.01	47.10	q
8	Tanya Thomas	Jamaica	38.37	41.26	45.13	45.13	
9	Amélie Perrin	France	42.61	x	43.82	43.82	

==== Group B ====
Rank	Name	Nationality	Attempts			Result	Notes
Rank	Name	Nationality	1	2	3	Result	Notes
1	Mélina Robert-Michon	France	53.67	-	-	53.67	Q
2	Lăcrămioara Ionescu	Romania	52.94	-	-	52.94	Q
3	Anaelys Fernández	Cuba	x	52.36	-	52.36	Q
4	Katrina Steele	Australia	51.53	-	-	51.53	Q
5	Krista Keir	United States	49.61	x	x	49.61	q
6	Venera Getova	Bulgaria	45.36	x	46.71	46.71	
7	Lauren Keightley	United Kingdom	44.62	41.10	x	44.62	
8	Wioletta Potępa	Poland	x	41.24	40.76	41.24	
9	Roselyn Hamero	Philippines	x	35.28	35.76	35.76	

== Participation ==
According to an unofficial count, 18 athletes from 14 countries participated in the event.

- Australia (2)
- Bulgaria (1)
- China (1)
- Croatia (1)
- Cuba (1)
- France (2)
- Germany (1)
- Jamaica (1)
- Philippines (1)
- Poland (1)
- Romania (2)
- Russia (1)
- United Kingdom (1)
- United States (2)
