= Athletics at the 2005 Summer Universiade – Women's discus throw =

The women's discus throw event at the 2005 Summer Universiade was held on 17–18 August in İzmir, Turkey.

== Medalists ==
Gold	Silver	Bronze
Wioletta Potępa; Poland	Song Aimin; China	Dragana Tomašević; Serbia and Montenegro

== Results ==
=== Qualification ===
Rank	Group	Athlete	Nationality	Result	Notes
1	B	Song Aimin	China	60.71	Q
2	A	Dragana Tomašević	Serbia and Montenegro	60.15	Q
3	A	Wioletta Potępa	Poland	56.97	Q
4	A	Liu Linpeng	China	56.93	Q
5	B	Darya Pishchalnikova	Russia	54.86	q
6	A	Jana Tucholke	Germany	54.27	q
7	A	Olga Chernogorova	Belarus	54.20	q
8	B	Sabine Rumpf	Germany	53.90	q
9	B	Natalya Fokina-Semenova	Ukraine	52.56	q
10	B	Laura Bordignon	Italy	51.67	q
11	B	Vera Begić	Croatia	51.20	q
12	B	Ahu Sulak	Turkey	51.15	q
13	A	Suzan Balkesen	Turkey	50.29	
14	B	Niina Kelo	Finland	49.99	
15	A	Svetlana Saykina	Russia	48.46	
16	B	Novelle Murray	Canada	46.92	
17	B	Dwi Ratnawati	Indonesia	46.78	
18	?	Mojca Črnigoj	Slovenia	45.90	
19	?	Cristiana Checchi	Italy	45.70	
20	?	Leung Yee Mei	Hong Kong	35.91	
	?	Mukasami Mwanangombe	Zambia	NM	

=== Final ===
Rank	Athlete	Nationality	#1	#2	#3	#4	#5	#6	Result	Notes
1st place, gold medalist(s)	Wioletta Potępa	Poland	59.98	x	62.10	57.70	x	–	62.10	
2nd place, silver medalist(s)	Song Aimin	China	x	61.74	x	60.44	59.88	58.51	61.74	
3rd place, bronze medalist(s)	Dragana Tomašević	Serbia and Montenegro	58.09	59.92	59.08	59.56	x	x	59.92	
4	Liu Linpeng	China	51.24	55.73	58.88	56.05	58.14	54.66	58.88	PB
5	Sabine Rumpf	Germany	54.91	55.63	58.22	57.92	x	54.23	58.22	
6	Darya Pishchalnikova	Russia	x	53.74	55.51	x	57.24	57.52	57.52	
7	Jana Tucholke	Germany	x	56.65	57.37	x	x	x	57.37	
8	Natalya Fokina-Semenova	Ukraine	54.76	x	54.74	56.47	56.05	55.76	56.47	
9	Olga Chernogorova	Belarus	x	54.57	x				54.57	
10	Vera Begić	Croatia	52.32	53.29	x				53.29	
11	Laura Bordignon	Italy	x	x	50.76				50.76	
12	Ahu Sulak	Turkey	50.48	x	x				50.48	
