= Vera Begić =

Croatian discus thrower

- Begić in 2009

Personal information
- Born: 17 March 1982 (age 44) Rijeka, Croatia (then part of Yugoslavia)
- Height: 1.68 m (5 ft 6 in)
- Weight: 70 kg (154 lb)

Sport
- Country: Croatia
- Club: Kvarner-Autotrans, Rijeka
- Coached by: Petar Kurtović; Sandor Varga (2005-2009)

Achievements and titles
- Personal bests: 61.52 m (May 2009 Bar, Montenegro)
Medal record
Representing Croatia
World Youth Games
| Silver medal – second place | 1998 Moscow | Discus throw |
Mediterranean Games
| Silver medal – second place | 2009 Pescara | Discus throw |
European Winter Throwing Cup
| Bronze medal – third place | 2009 Los Realejos | Discus throw |
Mediterranean Games
| Bronze medal – third place | 2005 Almería | Discus throw |
European Junior Championships
| Silver medal – second place | 2001 Grosseto | Discus throw |

Vera Begić (born 17 March 1982) is a Croatian athlete specialized in discus throwing discipline. Since Vera's mother Jadranka Antunović also was a successful athlete and member of the national team in Yugoslavia (long jump, pentathlon), Vera has been connected to athletics from the early childhood. At the age of 12 she decided to take the discus throwing for her preferred athletic discipline, and soon achieved very good results in the junior level of competition.

Vera broke the Croatian record for 21 times, ten of these in senior category, and she was champion of Croatia for twelve continuous years. Her personal best result of 61.52 m was achieved in May 2009 (Bar, Montenegro).

Vera Begić Blečić caused a deadly accident on 15 August 2018 while driving under the influence of alcohol (1,9 blood alcohol level - BAC) and driving the wrong way on the highway for more than 9 km she struck one car but continued driving until hitting another car with a couple and 10y old child inside. After the accident she exited the car walked to the victim's car and even though she heard cries for help she just returned to her car and waited for the police. The father of the 10y I.S. died in this accident the mother and child were injured. In October 2019 she was sentenced to 4 years of prison (the maximum penalty for this is 15y).

== Other activity ==
Vera has achieved the Master of Laws degree; she can communicate in fluent English and can also speak Russian, Hungarian and Italian.

== Achievements ==
| Year | Competition | Venue | Position | Notes |
Representing Croatia
| 1998 | World Youth Games | Moscow, Russia | 2nd | 48.70 m |
| 1998 | World Junior Championships | Annecy, France | 12th | 46.34 m |
| 1999 | World Youth Championships | Bydgoszcz, Poland | 4th | 48.80 m |
| 2000 | World Junior Championships | Santiago, Chile | 5th | 52.28 m |
| 2001 | European Junior Championships | Grosseto, Italy | 2nd | 55.02 m |
| 2001 | Universiade | Beijing, China | 14th (q) | 50.69 m |
| 2001 | Mediterranean Games | Radès, Tunisia | 5th | 52.18 m |
| 2002 | European Championships | Munich, Germany | – | NM |
| 2003 | European U-23 Championships | Bydgoszcz, Poland | 4th | 53.34 m |
| 2003 | Universiade | Daegu, South Korea | 11th | 52.22 m |
| 2004 | Olympic Games | Athens, Greece | 29th (q) | 57.31 m |
| 2005 | European Cup Winter Throwing | Mersin, Turkey | 8th | 56.08 m |
| 2005 | Mediterranean Games | Almería, Spain | 3rd | 56.53 m |
| 2005 | Universiade | İzmir, Turkey | 10th | 53.29 m |
| 2006 | European Championships | Gothenburg, Sweden | 14th | 55.61 m |
| 2007 | Universiade | Bangkok, Thailand | 4th | 55.26 m |
| 2008 | European Cup Winter Throwing | Split, Croatia | 5th | 57.98 m |
| 2008 | Olympic Games | Beijing, China | 22nd (q) | 58.50 m |
| 2009 | European Cup Winter Throwing | Los Realejos, Spain | 3rd | 59.27 m |
| 2009 | World Championships | Berlin, Germany | 24th (q) | 58.25 m |
| 2009 | Universiade | Belgrade, Serbia | 4th | 59.30 m |
| 2009 | Mediterranean Games | Pescara, Italy | 2nd | 60.29 m |
| 2010 | European Championships | Barcelona, Spain | 16th (q) | 55.04 m |
