= 2001 European Athletics U23 Championships – Women's discus throw =

The women's discus throw event at the 2001 European Athletics U23 Championships was held in Amsterdam, Netherlands, at Olympisch Stadion on 14 and 15 July.

== Medalists ==
Gold	Mélina Robert-Michon; France
Silver	Ileana Brindusoiu; Romania
Bronze	Olga Goncharenko; Belarus

== Results ==
=== Final ===
15 July

Rank	Name	Nationality	Attempts						Result	Notes
Rank	Name	Nationality	1	2	3	4	5	6	Result	Notes
1st place, gold medalist(s)	Mélina Robert-Michon	France	51.92	x	55.47	x	58.52	58.02	58.52	CR
2nd place, silver medalist(s)	Ileana Brindusoiu	Romania	54.77	58.25	57.38	55.41	x	54.46	58.25	
3rd place, bronze medalist(s)	Olga Goncharenko	Belarus	57.71	53.39	x	55.38	54.77	56.88	57.71	
4	Lăcrămioara Ionescu	Romania	57.43	56.23	57.15	54.89	53.64	54.61	57.43	
5	Wioletta Potępa	Poland	56.55	54.01	54.12	52.70	x	x	56.55	
6	Jana Tucholke	Germany	53.17	52.56	54.58	56.19	55.43	51.37	56.19	
7	Ilona Rutjes	Netherlands	51.05	52.22	54.80	53.06	55.15	50.79	55.15	
8	Adina Mocanu	Romania	51.59	x	54.42	49.74	52.68	x	54.42	
9	Katja Krol	Germany	51.12	52.73	54.36				54.36	
10	Amélie Perrin	France	47.74	52.07	53.23				53.23	
11	Ina Reiber	Germany	x	52.99	52.61				52.99	
12	Dace Ruskule	Latvia	49.41	47.81	52.79				52.79	

=== Qualifications ===
14 July
Qualifying 55.00 or 12 best to the Final

==== Group A ====
Rank	Name	Nationality	Result	Notes
1	Wioletta Potępa	Poland	54.27	q
2	Dace Ruskule	Latvia	52.73	q
3	Ina Reiber	Germany	51.71	q
4	Amélie Perrin	France	51.18	q
5	Adina Mocanu	Romania	50.85	q
6	Niina Kelo	Finland	50.19	
7	Ildikó Varga	Hungary	48.28	

==== Group B ====
Rank	Name	Nationality	Result	Notes
1	Mélina Robert-Michon	France	57.56	Q
2	Ileana Brindusoiu	Romania	55.91	Q
3	Lăcrămioara Ionescu	Romania	55.78	Q
4	Jana Tucholke	Germany	55.13	Q
5	Katja Krol	Germany	54.86	q
6	Olga Goncharenko	Belarus	53.97	q
7	Ilona Rutjes	Netherlands	52.88	q
8	Rebecca Roles	Great Britain	48.52	

== Participation ==
According to an unofficial count, 15 athletes from 10 countries participated in the event.

- Belarus (1)
- Finland (1)
- France (2)
- Germany (3)
- Great Britain (1)
- Hungary (1)
- Latvia (1)
- Netherlands (1)
- Poland (1)
- Romania (3)
