= Jesenija Volžankina =

Latvian heptathlete

Jesenija Volžankina (born 26 November 1983) is a retired Latvian heptathlete.

She finished thirteenth in the heptathlon at the 2006 European Championships. She also competed in the long jump at the 2005 European Indoor Championships and the 2006 European Championships without reaching the final.

Her personal best heptathlon score was 5996 points, achieved in July 2006 in Monzón. Her personal best long jump was 6.54 metres, achieved in August 2006 in Tallinn.
