= Amélie Perrin =

French hammer thrower

Personal information
- Born: 30 March 1980 (age 46) Dreux, Eure-et-Loir
- Height: 1.72 m (5 ft 8 in)
- Weight: 98 kg (216 lb)

Sport
- Country: France
- Sport: Athletics
- Updated on 27 June 2013

Amélie Perrin (born 30 March 1980 in Dreux, Eure-et-Loir) is a female hammer thrower from France. Her personal best throw is 71.38 metres, achieved in July 2006 in Sotteville-lès-Rouen.

== Personal bests ==
- Discus throw: 56.05 m – (France) Salon-de-Provence, 26 May 2002
- Hammer throw: 71.38 m – (France) Sotteville-lès-Rouen, 2 July 2006

== Achievements ==
Year	Competition	Venue	Position	Event	Notes
Representing France
1997	European Youth Olympic Festival	Lisbon, Portugal	3rd	Discus	47.66 m
1998	World Junior Championships	Annecy, France	16th (q)	Discus	43.82 m
1999	European Junior Championships	Riga, Latvia	5th	Discus	49.60 m
1999	European Junior Championships	Riga, Latvia	16th (q)	Hammer	51.46 m
2001	European U23 Championships	Amsterdam, Netherlands	10th	Discus	53.23 m
2001	European U23 Championships	Amsterdam, Netherlands	20th (q)	Hammer	56.33 m
2005	Mediterranean Games	Almería, Spain	6th	Hammer	64.88 m
2005	Jeux de la Francophonie	Niamey, Niger	2nd	Hammer	64.02 m
2006	European Championships	Gothenburg, Sweden	7th	Hammer	62.36 m
2007	World Championships	Osaka, Japan	20th (q)	Hammer	66.67 m
2008	Olympic Games	Beijing, PR China	—	Hammer	NM
2009	ALBA Games	La Habana, Cuba	3rd	Hammer	66.86 m
2009	Mediterranean Games	Pescara, Italy	6th	Hammer	66.09 m
2009	Jeux de la Francophonie	Beirut, Lebanon	3rd	Hammer	66.17 m
