= Niina Kelo =

Finnish heptathlete

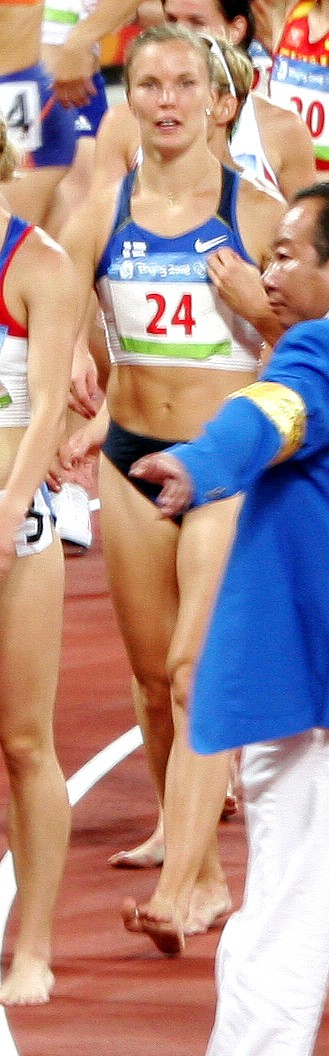
- Niina Kelo at the 2008 Olympics

Personal information
- Full name: Niina Anneli Kelo
- Born: 26 March 1980 (age 46) Järvenpää, Finland
- Height: 1.78 m (5 ft 10 in)

Sport
- Country: Finland
- Sport: Athletics
- Event: Heptathlon

Achievements and titles
- Olympic finals: 23rd at the 2008 Summer Olympics
- Regional finals: 15th at the 2006 and 2012 European Championships
- Personal bests: 200 m: 25.65 (August 2006); 800 m: 2:18.92 (August 2006); 100 m hurdles: 13.90 (August 2006); High jump: 1.68 (July 2006); Long jump: 5.99 (August 2006); Shot put: 15.19 (August 2004); Javelin: 54.47 (June 2011); Heptathlon: 5956 (August 2006)

Niina Anneli Kelo (born 26 March 1980) is a Finnish athlete who specialises in the heptathlon.

Kelo represented Finland at the 2008 Summer Olympics where she finished 23rd in the heptathlon, scoring a season best of 5911 points.

== Achievements ==
| Year | Competition | Venue | Position | Event | Notes |
Representing Finland
| 2001 | European U23 Championships | Amsterdam, Netherlands | 13th (q) | Discus | 50.19 m |
| 2003 | Universiade | Daegu, South Korea | 13th | Heptathlon | 5434 |
| 2005 | Universiade | İzmir, Turkey | 14th (q) | Discus throw | 49.99 m |
| 2006 | European Championships | Gothenburg, Sweden | 15th | Heptathlon | 5956, PB |
| 2008 | Olympic Games | Beijing, China | 23rd | Heptathlon | 5911, SB |
| 2012 | European Championships | Helsinki, Finland | 15th | Heptathlon | 5692 |
