= Jana Tucholke =

German discus thrower

Jana Tucholke (born 20 May 1981 in Leipzig) is a German retired discus thrower. She set her personal best (62.31 metres) on 12 May 2007, at a meet in Leipzig.

== Achievements ==
Year	Competition	Venue	Position	Notes
Representing Germany
2000	World Junior Championships	Santiago, Chile	2nd	53.97 m
2001	European U23 Championships	Amsterdam, Netherlands	6th	56.19 m
2002	European Championships	Munich, Germany	11th	56.53 m
2002	World Cup	Madrid, Spain	6th	57.94 m
2003	European U23 Championships	Bydgoszcz, Poland	2nd	58.24 m
2003	Universiade	Daegu, South Korea	6th	55.71 m
2005	Universiade	İzmir, Turkey	7th	57.37 m
