= Wioletta Potępa =

Polish discus thrower (born 1980)

Wioletta Potępa (born 13 December 1980 in Ciechanów) is a Polish former discus thrower. Her personal best throw is 66.01 metres, achieved in May 2006 in Halle. She retired in August 2012.

== Competition record ==
Year	Competition	Venue	Position	Event	Notes
Representing Poland
1997	European Junior Championships	Ljubljana, Slovenia	9th	Shot put	14.78 m
1998	World Junior Championships	Annecy, France	6th	Shot put	15.24 m
1998	World Junior Championships	Annecy, France	17th (q)	Discus	41.24 m
1999	European Junior Championships	Riga, Latvia	1st	Discus throw	53.93 m
2001	European U23 Championships	Amsterdam, Netherlands	5th	Discus throw	56.55 m
2003	Universiade	Daegu, South Korea	4th	Discus throw	57.79 m
2004	Olympic Games	Athens, Greece	16th (q)	Discus throw	60.50 m
2005	Universiade	İzmir, Turkey	1st	Discus throw	62.10 m
2005	World Athletics Final	Monte Carlo, Monaco	6th	Discus throw	57.93 m
2006	European Championships	Gothenburg, Sweden	5th	Discus throw	61.78 m
2006	World Athletics Final	Stuttgart, Germany	6th	Discus throw	60.12 m
2006	World Cup	Athens, Greece	5th	Discus throw	60.82
2008	Olympic Games	Beijing, China	19th (q)	Discus throw	59.44 m
2009	World Championships	Berlin, Germany	17th (q)	Discus throw	59.54 m
2010	European Championships	Barcelona, Spain	12th	Discus throw	55.48 m
