= Charles van Commenee =

Dutch athletics coach

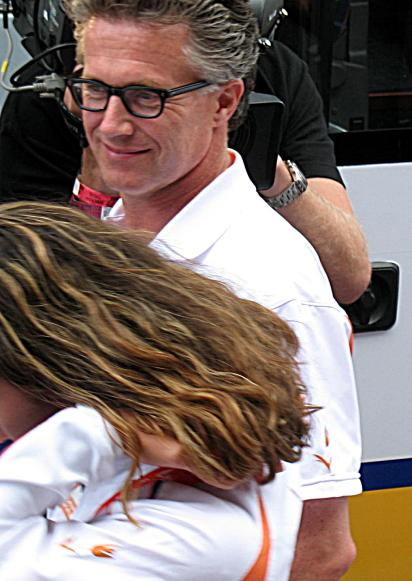
Charles van Commenee at the welcoming of the Netherlands team at the 2008 Summer Olympics

Charles van Commenee, written in Dutch as van Commenée, (born 22 June 1958) is a Dutch athletics coach. He began his professional career as a technical director with the Dutch athletics federation before moving to take up a similar role for the British athletics team in 2001. After a term as Performance Director for the Dutch Olympic Committee, he served as Head Coach of British Athletics from 2008 to 2012. Additionally, he has personally coached athletes to international medals, including Denise Lewis, Kelly Sotherton and Huang Zhihong.

== Early career ==
Charles van Commenee was born in Amsterdam, Holland, the son of Otto (a heavy industry worker) and Ineke (a woman of Indo Eurasian heritage). He grew up in Osdorp, a borough of the city, and from an early age he was instilled with a strong work ethic. As a young man he was interested in athletics, competing in the decathlon at club level, but several injuries forced him to give up the sport.

Van Commenee first became involved in coaching at the age of eighteen; he began teaching children while studying for a degree in physical education. After completing his military service in 1981, he dedicated himself to coaching full-time and in 1987 he was appointed as the coach for the Dutch javelin team. Building upon his coaching success, in 1992 he was promoted to technical director of combined events and throws by the Dutch athletics federation. He took on other coaching responsibilities, including a brief stay in China where he met shot put thrower Huang Zhihong. He began coaching her in 1993 and at the 1995 World Championships she took the silver medal. Though this was a significant achievement for the veteran athlete, Van Commenee said that he was as much a personal mentor for Huang as he was a coach. She had moved away from home to attend a sports institute at the age of twelve and had not experienced life outside of the centre. Van Commenee had helped her adapt to living on her own and supporting herself, at the same time as he helped her to a World Championship medal.

The coach showed his stubborn and determined temperament when in 1996 he withdrew from managing the Dutch Olympic team because he felt that one of his trainees, Sharon Jaklofsky, was receiving unfair treatment. His trip to the 1996 Atlanta Olympics was self-funded and he took Jaklofsky out of the Dutch camp for training every day. She reached the finals of the competition but faulted three times, failing to record a mark.

== British coaching ==
Van Commenee first met British heptathlon athlete Denise Lewis in 1994 at an athletics meeting in Valladolid, Spain. Her coach Darrell Bunn could not attend the meeting and Van Commenee was asked to help her through the event. Impressed with his work, Lewis moved to Amsterdam to train with Van Commenee in 1997. The pairing was fruitful for both athlete and coach; under the supervision of Van Commenee, Lewis went on become heptathlon champion at both the Commonwealth Games and European Championships in 1998 and won silver at the 1999 World Championships. At the 2000 Sydney Olympics she took the gold in the heptathlon, becoming the first of Van Commenee's charges to win an Olympic gold medal. However, her victory was not easily forthcoming; during the Olympic events Van Commenee was critical of her performances, urging her ever more to try harder. Despite the fact that Lewis was suffering injuries, she managed to win the event. She put much of her success and drive to win down to the fact that Van Commenee had been so strict:

"His virtues are two-fold really. As a person he's actually much more sensitive than people might believe. And as a coach, he is driven. Athletes, not least me, would really just love to go our merry way. He doesn't let you. We've had a lot of difficulties in the three years we've been together and he gets you right at the right time. My self-discipline is down to him."

— Denise Lewis, The Daily Telegraph

Van Commenee also worked with less prominent athletes, helping them improve their performances through sheer hard work—he coached Lieja Koeman at the Olympics and although the shot putter was ranked 23rd in the world she managed to finish ninth in the competition. In recognition of his achievements, he was named as the 2000 Amsterdam Coach of the Year. Following his success with Lewis, in 2001 he was appointed by UK Athletics as the technical director for the jumps and combined events. As director he took on responsibilities for British athletes including Dean Macey, Ashia Hansen and Jonathan Edwards, though they all retained personal coaches. In 2003 he asked Kelly Sotherton to join his training group and she agreed. Although she was ranked 57th in the world for the heptathlon, she won the bronze medal at the 2004 Athens Olympics. However, this was still not enough for Van Commenee and he branded her "a wimp" for not managing to finish in second place. Later on, he expressed regret over the timing of the comment but Sotherton stood by her coach regardless, stating: "People always go on about that quote, but they have to remember that Charles was the one who got me in the position to be an Olympic medallist...I don't think any other coach could have got me to where he did."

In 2004 the position of performance director became available at UK Athletics. Van Commenee was considered for the job but ultimately decided to leave the UK in favour of becoming technical director of the Netherlands athletics team. After a successful period in the Netherlands, where he took them to their second-highest ever Olympic medal tally at the 2008 Beijing Olympics, he returned to the UK to take up the position of national head coach from September 2008.

Charles van Commenee stepped down as UK Athletics head coach after the team failed to meet his medal target at the 2012 Olympics in London.
