= Laura Bordignon =

Italian discus thrower and shot putter

Personal information
- Nationality: Italian
- Born: 26 March 1981 (age 45) Bassano del Grappa, Italy

Sport
- Country: Italy
- Sport: Athletics
- Event(s): Discus throw Shot put
- Club: G.S. Fiamme Azzurre

Achievements and titles
- Personal bests: Shot put 16.75 m (2005); Discus throw: 59.21 m (2008)
Medal record
Mediterranean Games
Silver medal – second place	2005 Almeria	Discus throw
World Youth Games
Bronze medal – third place	1998 Moscow	Shot put

Laura Bordignon (born 26 March 1981 in Bassano del Grappa) is an Italian discus thrower and shot putter.

== Biography ==
She won one medal, at senior level, at the International athletics competitions. She has 23 caps in national team from 2003 to 2012.

== Achievements ==
Year	Competition	Venue	Position	Event	Notes
Representing Italy
1998	World Youth Games	(Russia) Moscow	3rd	Shot put	14.43 m
2000	World Junior Championships	Santiago, Chile	16th (q)	Discus	46.88 m
2003	European U23 Championships	Bydgoszcz, Poland	5th	Discus	52.97 m
2005	European Cup (1st league)	(Italy) Florence	6th	Discus throw	57.23 m
2005	Mediterranean Games	(Spain) Almeria	2nd	Discus throw	57.98 m
2006	European Cup (Super league)	(Czech Republic) Prague	3rd	Discus throw	55.58 m
2009	European Team Championships	(Portugal) Leiria	6th	Discus throw	56.45 m
2009	Summer Universiade	(Serbia) Belgrade	5th	Discus throw	57.05 m

== National titles ==
Laura Bordignon has won 11 times the individual national championship.

- 5 wins in the discus throw (2006, 2008, 2009, 2010, 2011)
- 6 wins in the discus throw at the Italian Winter Throwing Championships (2008, 2009, 2010, 2011, 2012, 2014)

== See also ==
- Italian all-time lists - Discus throw
