= Natalia Semenova =

Ukrainian discus thrower (born 1982)

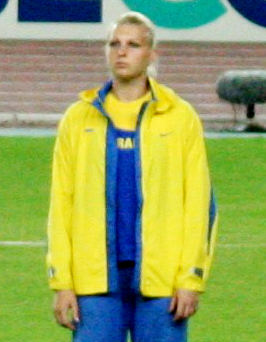
- Natalya Fokina-Semenova in 2007

Personal information
- Born: 7 July 1982 (age 44)
- Height: 1.78 m (5 ft 10 in)
- Weight: 90 kg (198 lb)

Sport
- Country: Ukraine
- Sport: Athletics
- Event: Discus
- Updated on 14 August 2012

Natalia Semenova (born 7 July 1982) is a Ukrainian discus thrower.

Her personal best throw is 64.70 m achieved in Kyiv in 2008.

== Competition record ==
| Year | Competition | Venue | Position | Notes |
Representing Ukraine
| 2000 | World Junior Championships | Santiago, Chile | 6th | 51.44 m |
| 2003 | European U23 Championships | Bydgoszcz, Poland | 1st | 59.30 m |
| 2003 | Universiade | Daegu, South Korea | 1st | 63.11 m (PB) |
| 2004 | Olympic Games | Athens, Greece | 24th (q) | 58.28 m |
| 2005 | World Championships | Helsinki, Finland | 9th | 58.44 m |
| 2005 | Universiade | İzmir, Turkey | 8th | 56.47 m |
| 2006 | European Championships | Gothenburg, Sweden | 9th | 59.99 m |
| 2007 | World Championships | Osaka, Japan | 8th | 61.17 m |
| 2008 | Olympic Games | Athens, Greece | 14th (q) | 60.18 m |
| 2011 | World Championships | Daegu, South Korea | 16th (q) | 58.27 m |
| 2012 | European Championships | Helsinki, Finland | 3rd | 62.91 m |
| 2012 | Olympic Games | London, United Kingdom | 18th (q) | 60.61 m |
| 2013 | World Championships | Moscow, Russia | 23rd (q) | 55.79 m |
| 2014 | European Championships | Zurich, Switzerland | 21st (q) | 46.57 m |
| 2015 | World Championships | Beijing, China | 12th | 59.54 m |
| 2016 | European Championships | Amsterdam, Netherlands | 6th | 62.21 m |
| 2016 | Olympic Games | Rio de Janeiro, Brazil | 15th (q) | 58.41 m |
| 2017 | World Championships | London, United Kingdom | 25th (q) | 55.83 m |
| 2019 | World Championships | Doha, Qatar | 25th (q) | 54.68 m |
| 2021 | Olympic Games | Tokyo, Japan | 31st (q) | 54.28 m |
