= Athletics at the 2003 Summer Universiade – Women's discus throw =

The women's discus throw event at the 2003 Summer Universiade was held on 28 August in Daegu, South Korea.

== Results ==
Rank	Athlete	Nationality	#1	#2	#3	#4	#5	#6	Result	Notes
1st place, gold medalist(s)	Natalya Fokina	Ukraine	59.70	59.36	59.14	57.01	63.11	58.43	63.11	
2nd place, silver medalist(s)	Li Yanfeng	China	59.92	61.12	59.72	x	58.56	58.72	61.12	
3rd place, bronze medalist(s)	Xu Shaoyang	China	x	58.64	54.72	x	55.76	x	58.64	
4	Wioletta Potępa	Poland	x	55.61	55.15	57.79	55.91	54.95	57.79	
5	Elizna Naudé	South Africa	53.28	56.40	x	54.93	54.86	55.07	56.40	
6	Jana Tucholke	Germany	54.08	54.70	55.71	x	x	x	55.71	
7	Debbie Pickersgill	Australia	55.25	49.59	53.56	53.75	53.31	53.82	55.25	
8	Olga Chernogorova	Belarus	50.95	x	53.84	51.89	52.73	53.57	53.84	
9	Anita Hietalahti	Finland	52.99	52.25	53.58				53.58	
10	Lyudmila Rublevskaya	Russia	52.93	53.57	x				53.57	
11	Vera Begić	Croatia	x	52.22	49.09				52.22	
12	Maria Pettersson	Sweden	50.86	51.30	x				51.30	
13	Lee Yun-Kyoung	South Korea	43.95	46.22	43.19				46.22	
14	Brigitte Traoré	Burkina Faso	30.74	46.16	45.73				46.16	
15	Tereapii Tapoki	Cook Islands	x	45.48	42.40				45.48	
16	Maranelle du Toit	South Africa	45.46	45.34	43.59				45.46	
17	Vika Koloa	Tonga	x	28.27	x				28.27	
