= Anaelys Fernández =

Cuban discus thrower (born 1979)

Personal information
- Born: December 15, 1979 (age 46)

Sport
- Country: Cuba
- Sport: Athletics
Medal record
Representing Cuba
Pan American Games
Silver medal – second place	2003 Santo Domingo	Discus throw
Bronze medal – third place	1999 Winnipeg	Discus throw
- Updated on 26 May 2013

Anaelys Fernández (born December 15, 1979) is a retired discus thrower from Cuba. Her personal best throw is 62.09 metres, achieved on June 13, 2003, in Havana.

== Biography ==
She finished in sixth place at the 1998 World Junior Championships in Athletics in Annecy, France. She won the discus throw bronze medal at the 1999 Pan American Games and improved to take the silver medal at the 2003 edition. She is a two-time Cuban champion in the event, having won in 1999 and 2003.

== Achievements ==
Year	Competition	Venue	Position	Event	Notes
Representing Cuba
1997	Pan American Junior Championships	La Habana, Cuba	4th	Discus	49.24 m
1998	World Junior Championships	Annecy, France	6th	Discus	52.27 m
1999	Pan American Games	Winnipeg, Canada	3rd	Discus	56.32 m
2003	Pan American Games	Santo Domingo, Dominican Republic	2nd	Discus	61.26 m
2005	ALBA Games	La Habana, Cuba	2nd	Discus	55.82 m
