= Kerry Jury =

English heptathlete

Personal information
- Nationality: British (English)
- Born: 19 November 1968 (age 57) Worcester, England

Sport
- Sport: Athletics
- Event: heptathlon
- Club: Wakefield AC

Kerry Louise Jury (born 1968) is a female former athlete who competed for England.

== Biography ==
Jury finished third behind Emma Beales in the heptathlon event at the 1995 AAA Championships but the following year she became the British heptathlon champion at the 1996 AAA Championships.

Jury represented England in the heptathlon event, at the 1998 Commonwealth Games in Kuala Lumpur, Malaysia.

In September 2002, Jury scored 6145 points at a women's decathlon in Jarrow, placing her among the top 90 performers all-time in the event as of 2025.
