= Liu Fengying =

Chinese discus thrower (born 1979)

Liu Fengying (Chinese: 刘凤英; pinyin: Liú Fèngyīng; born 26 January 1979) is a Chinese discus thrower.

She won the 1998 World Junior Championships and finished second at the 1998 Asian Games behind fellow Chinese Luan Zhili.

Her personal best was 65.20 metres, achieved in June 1997 in Chengdu. The Chinese, and Asian, record is currently held by Xiao Yanling with 71.68 metres.

She is now a faculty member of Guangzhou Sport University.
