= Lyudmyla Blonska =

Ukrainian heptathlete

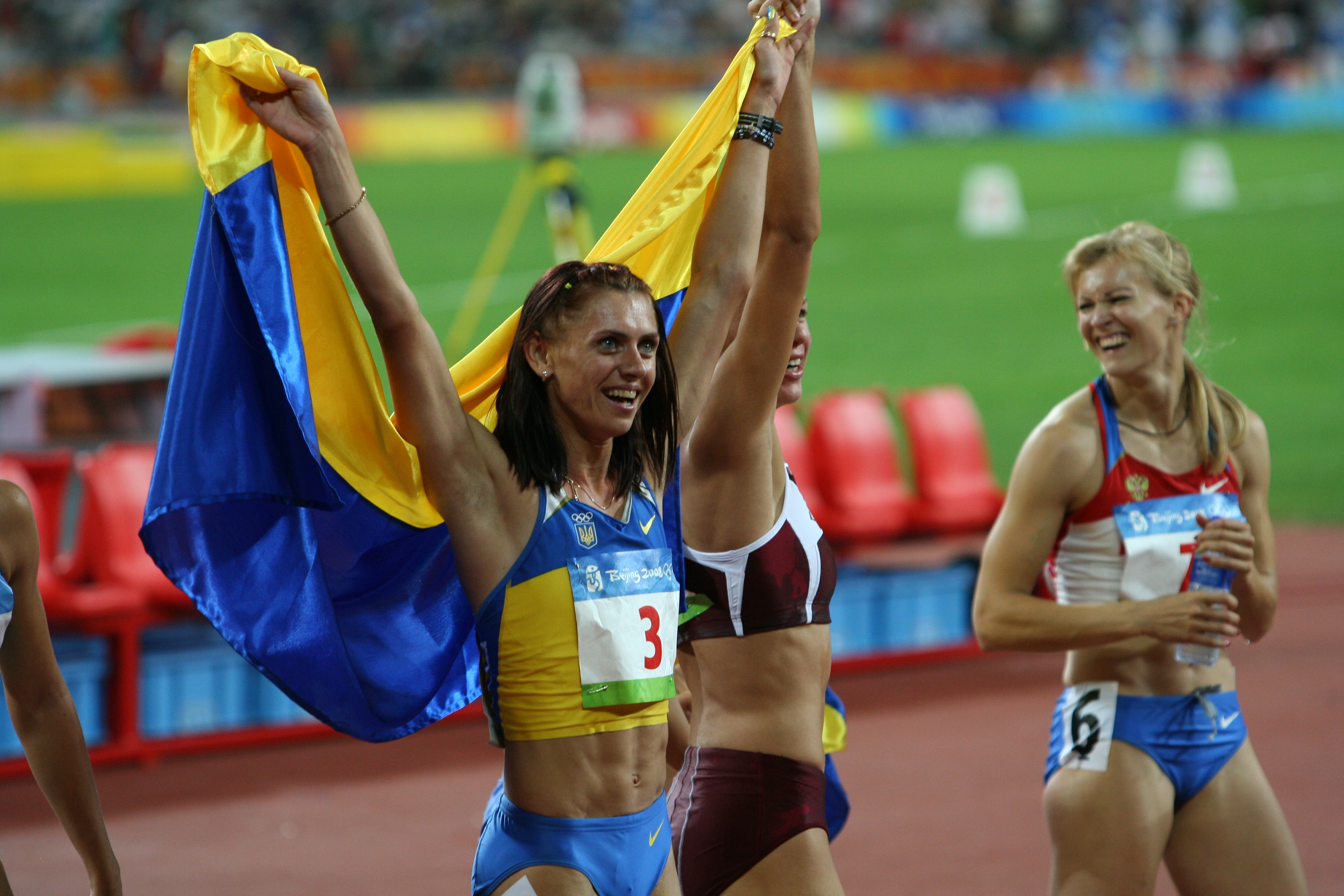
- Blonska at the 2008 Olympics

Personal information
- Native name: Людмила Леонідівна Блонська
- Full name: Lyudmyla Leonidivna Blonska
- Born: 9 November 1977 (age 48) Simferopol, Crimean Oblast, Ukrainian SSR, Soviet Union
- Height: 1.75 m (5 ft 9 in)
Medal record
Women's athletics
Representing Ukraine
Olympic Games
| Disqualified | 2008 Beijing | Heptathlon |
World Championships
| Silver medal – second place | 2007 Osaka | Heptathlon |
World Indoor Championships
| Gold medal – first place | 2006 Moscow | Pentathlon |
Universiade
| Gold medal – first place | 2005 Izmir | Heptathlon |

Lyudmyla Leonidivna Blonska, née Shevchuk (Ukrainian: Людмила Леонідівна Блонська (Шевчук)), sometimes known as Lyudmila Blonskaya, (born November 9, 1977) is a Ukrainian former heptathlete, pentathlete, and long jumper. She was given a lifetime ban from competition after failing a drug test at the 2008 Summer Olympics, her second doping offense.

== Personal life ==
Blonska was born as Lyudmyla Leonidivna Shevchuk on 9 November 1977 in Simferopol, Crimea, Ukrainian SSR. In 2000, she graduated from the Kharkiv Institute as a trainer and teacher of physical culture. She then moved to Brovary with fellow athlete Serhiy Blonskyy, whom she married. They have two children: Iryna (born 15 May 2001) and Oleksandr (born 23 June 2004).

== Career ==
Blonska practiced rhythmic gymnastics from age five to ten. She then switched to basketball and later judo and cycle racing. At age 14 she was introduced to athletics by a local coach.

In 1993, Blonska participated in the Ukrainian Youth Championships in Odesa, entering the heptathlon competition for the first time. She recalled crying out of fear before the 800m event, but then falling in love with heptathlon after scoring good results.

In 1995, after finishing school, Blonska moved to the capital, Kyiv, to begin training as member of the Ukrainian youth team. Five months later she received an invitation to study at the Institute of Sports and Physical Culture in Kharkiv. She found herself without a trainer and had to coach herself for a year and a half, while working at night to make ends meet.

In 1998, Blonska achieved third place in the national championships with 5554 points and, in 1999, improved her personal best (PB) to 5765.

In May 2002, a year after becoming a mother, Blonska won the national championship with a PB of 6039 and qualified for the European Championships in Munich. There she finished thirteenth and soon thereafter tested positive for steroids. She served a two-year ban before returning to the sport.

Blonska won the gold medal at the 2005 Summer Universiade and finished fifth at the 2006 European Championships. She won the gold medal at the 2006 World Indoor Championships in the pentathlon.

Blonska's personal best heptathlon score is 6832 points, a Ukrainian record, achieved in August 2007 in Osaka where she won the silver medal. Just prior to the 2008 Olympics, she finished eighth in pentathlon at the World Indoor Championships.

At the 2008 Olympics, Blonska won silver in the women's heptathlon, but she was quickly disqualified and lost her medal after she tested positive for the anabolic steroid methyltestosterone. She had qualified for the long jump final, but the International Olympic Committee decided to expel her from the Games completely. As this was her second doping offence, she was given a lifetime ban from competitive athletics. Her husband/coach was also banned for life.

== See also ==
- Doping at the Olympic Games
- List of doping cases in athletics
