= 1998 World Youth Games =

International multi-sport event

- Official logo
- Host city: Moscow
- Nations: 140 (estimated)
- Athletes: 7,500 (estimated)
- Opening: 11 July
- Closing: 19 July
- Opened by: Boris Yeltsin; President of Russia
- Main venue: Luzhniki Stadium

The 1998 World Youth Games was an international multi-sport event. More than 7,500 young athletes representing 140 countries of the world participated in this event. The Games took place in Moscow, Russia, from 11–19 July 1998.

== Ceremony ==
The opening ceremony was held in Luzhniki Stadium (Стадион "Лужники"). It included 32 International Olympic Committee (IOC) members, 43 National Olympic Committee (NOC) presidents, Boris Yeltsin – then current president of the Russian Federation, Yuri Luzhkov – mayor of Moscow, with the presence of 80,000 spectators. Two Russian cosmonauts greeted all the spectators directly from Orbital Station Mir. The mayor of Moscow and the IOC president addressed the spectators, and Boris Yeltsin declared the World Youth Games opened.

== Participants and sports ==
More than 7,500 young athletes under 17 years of age representing 140 countries competed in a variety of sports that included basketball, football, volleyball, handball, tennis and table tennis, track and field athletics, swimming, synchronized swimming, gymnastics and modern rhythmic gymnastics, fencing, judo and Greco-Roman wrestling.

- Athletics ()

== Objective ==
The main objectives of the first World Youth Games were to involve the young participants in the Olympic movement and promote the Olympic spirit of friendship and mutual understanding among peoples, preparing their psychological and aptitude conditions for international starts and also selecting young talents for the participation in future Olympic Games.

Beginning from 2010, the Youth Olympic Games were to be held every four years in staggered summer and winter events complementing the Olympic Games, thus rendering the World Youth Games obsolete.

== Mascot ==
The motto of the World Youth Games was "the open world for childhood" and its mascot was Mishka (Мишка) – the Russian Bear that was also the mascot of the XXII Summer Olympic Games in Moscow 1980.

== Initiation ==
On 27 November 1995, a small government delegation from Moscow visited the headquarters of the International Olympic Committee in Lausanne, Switzerland, in order to rally support for the organisation of a major international youth competition under IOC patronage in the Russian capital. Moscow's delegation argued that the city had a strong experience of staging sport events. The IOC granted its patronage to the “World Youth Games” and an agreement was signed in April 1997 between the IOC, the city of Moscow and the Russian Olympic Committee, setting out the event.

== Sports ==
The festival of 32 demonstration (non-Olympic) sports

| Sports | NOC | Boys | Girls | Total |
|---|---|---|---|---|
| Basketball | 25 | 190 | 191 | 381 |
| Freestyle Wrestling | 51 | 235 | — | 235 |
| Greek-Roman Wrestling | 46 | 227 | — | 227 |
| Volleyball | 22 | 191 | 190 | 381 |
| Handball | 13 | 112 | 98 | 210 |
| Artistic Gymnastics | 59 | 162 | 147 | 309 |
| Rhythmic Gymnastics | 48 | — | 184 | 184 |
| Judo | 70 | 281 | 174 | 455 |
| Athletics | 87 | 382 | 296 | 678 |
| Swimming | 62 | 255 | 173 | 428 |
| Synchronized Swimming | 23 | — | 137 | 137 |
| Tennis | 56 | 98 | 74 | 172 |
| Table Tennis | 55 | 162 | 111 | 273 |
| Fencing | 50 | 200 | 118 | 318 |
| Football | 16 | 288 | — | 288 |
| Total | 131* | 2783 | 1893 | 4676 |

- Six of the NOC delegations had only observers.
1. Athletics at the 1998 World Youth Games

== Medals ==
Athletes from 68 countries won 523 medals.

== Nations ==
- Albania
- Algeria
- Angola
- Argentina
- Armenia
- Australia
- Austria
- Azerbaijan
- Bangladesh
- Barbados
- Belarus
- Belgium
- Bolivia
- Bosnia and Herzegovina
- Botswana
- Brazil
- Bulgaria
- Burundi
- Cambodia
- Canada
- Central African Republic
- Cape Verde
- Colombia
- Chile
- People's Republic of China
- Chinese Taipei
- Costa Rica
- Croatia
- Cuba
- Cyprus
- Czech Republic
- Egypt
- Estonia
- Ethiopia
- Finland
- France
- Gabon
- Gambia
- Georgia
- Germany
- Gibraltar
- Ghana
- Greece
- Great Britain
- Guam
- Guatemala
- Guinea-Bissau
- Guyana
- Honduras
- Hong Kong
- Hungary
- India
- Iran
- Iraq
- Ireland
- Italy
- Israel
- Jamaica
- Japan
- Jordan
- Kazakhstan
- Kenya
- Korea Republic
- Kyrgyzstan
- Laos
- Latvia
- Lebanon
- Lesotho
- Libya
- Lithuania
- Luxembourg
- Macedonia
- Malaysia
- Malawi
- Maldives
- Mali
- Mauritius
- Mexico
- Moldova
- Monaco
- Mongolia
- Mozambique
- Namibia
- Nigeria
- Netherlands
- Nepal
- New Zealand
- North Korea
- Norway
- Oman
- Palestine
- Peru
- Philippines
- Poland
- Portugal
- Puerto Rico
- Qatar
- Romania
- Russia
- Rwanda
- São Tomé and Príncipe
- Saudi Arabia
- Seychelles
- Singapore
- Slovakia
- Slovenia
- South Africa
- Spain
- Sri Lanka
- Suriname
- Sweden
- Switzerland
- Syria
- Tajikistan
- Tanzania
- Togo
- Trinidad and Tobago
- Turkey
- Turkmenistan
- Uganda
- Ukraine
- United Arab Emirates
- United States of America
- Uruguay
- Uzbekistan
- Venezuela
- Vietnam
- Yemen
- FR Yugoslavia
- Zambia
- Zimbabwe

== Infrastructure ==
After the agreement was signed, Moscow started its infrastructure preparations. It undertook 2 major projects. The first was the renovation of the Luzhniki Sports Arena, which was completed in September 1997 at Moscow's 850th anniversary. The stadium was built in 1955, and in 1980 it became the heart of the XXII Summer Olympic Games. The other major project was the construction of the Olympic village. This contraction was placed under the control of the city administration and it was based on the plan of the 1980 Olympic Village. The Village constituted of five 19-to-25 story buildings, a complex-sport gymnasium, a cycling track and a massive cafeteria. In addition, its landscape included artificial hills and a lake. Later, this complex-building became one of the most prestigious residential areas in the city.

== See also ==
- Youth Olympic Games
