= Louise Hazel =

British heptathlete

Louise Hazel OLY
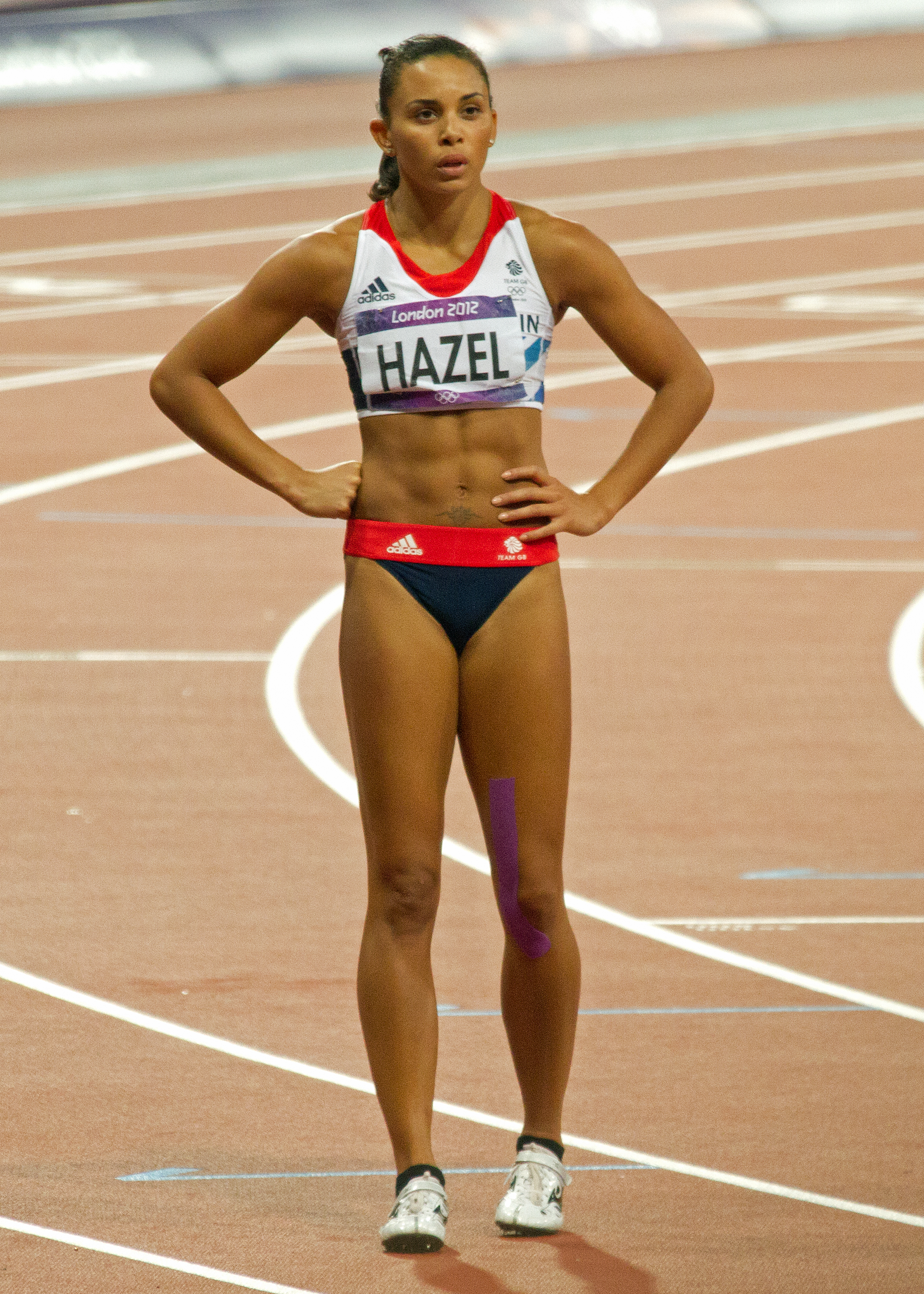
- Hazel in 2012

Personal information
- Nationality: United Kingdom
- Born: Louise Victoria Hazel; 6 October 1985 (age 41) Southwark, London, England
- Height: 1.67 m (5 ft 6 in)
- Weight: 56 kg (123 lb)

Sport
- Country: Great Britain (GBR); England (ENG)
- Sport: Athletics
- Event: Heptathlon
- Club: Birchfield Harriers

Achievements and titles
- Personal best: 6156 (2010)
Medal record
Women's athletics
Representing England
Commonwealth Games
Gold medal – first place	2010 Delhi	Heptathlon

Louise Victoria Hazel (born 6 October 1985) is an English track and field athlete from March, Cambridgeshire, who specialises in the multi-event heptathlon. She has competed in four major international championships. The first was in 2006 when she came 17th at the European Championships and the second was three years later when she finished 14th at the World Championships. During 2009 she was ranked 2nd best in the country and 9th best of all time. In the 2010 Commonwealth Games she won the gold medal for the England team, with a personal best of 6156 points. At the 2011 Mehrkampf-Meeting Ratingen she scored 6166 points but this included wind-assisted performances and she also competed at the 2012 Summer Olympics. In July 2012 she appeared with Tasha Danvers, Mark Foster and Derek Redmond on the Channel 4 programme Come Dine with Me prior to her Olympics competition, and won the show.

In September 2013 she announced her retirement from heptathlon, although she could compete in other events. In January 2014 she announced that she would come out of retirement to defend her title at the 2014 Commonwealth Games in Glasgow after Jessica Ennis-Hill announced that she would miss the Games due to pregnancy, but in June 2014 Hazel stated that she had decided to abandon her comeback due to her training schedule being disrupted by a flare-up of ulcerative colitis.

== Early life ==
Hazel was born in Southwark, London and enjoyed sports as a child. Encouraged by her father she began training at age 10 at the local athletics club. She was educated at Neale-Wade Community College in Cambridgeshire and graduated with a BA in French from the University of Birmingham. While at university she joined the renowned Birchfield Harriers Athletics Club.

== Advocacy ==
Hazel is an ambassador for the British Heart Foundation.

== Competition record ==
=== 2010 Commonwealth Games ===
Event	Result	Position	Points	Overall	Notes
100 metre hurdles	13.25 secs	2nd	1,087	2nd	(1,087) Personal Best
High jump	1.69 m	7th	842	4th	(1,929)
Shot put	12.54 m	5th	697	5th	(2,626)
200 metres	24.10 secs	2nd	971	3rd	(3,597) Personal Best
Long jump	6.44 m	1st	988	1st	(4,585) Personal Best. Lead by 74 points
Javelin	44.42 m	1st	752	1st	(5,337) Personal Best. Lead by 126 points
800 metres	2:20.33	4th	819	1st	(6,156) Won by 56 points
Heptathlon			6,156	1st	Commonwealth Games Gold Medalist.

=== 2011 World Championships ===
Event	Result	Position	Points	Overall	Notes
100 metre hurdles	13.24 secs	5th	1,089	5th	(1,089) Personal Best
High jump	1.74 m	20th	903	16th	(1,992) Personal Best
Shot put	12.36 m	22nd	685	18th	(2,677)
200 metres	24.25 secs	7th	957	16th	(3,634)
Long jump	6.25 m	10th	927	13th	(4,561)
Javelin	41.75 m	17th	701	16th	(5,262)
800 metres	2:15.44	16th	887	15th	(6,149)
Heptathlon			6,149	15th	

=== 2012 Olympic Games ===
Event	Result	Position	Points	Overall	Notes
100 metre hurdles	13.48 secs	=15th	1,053	=15th	(1,053)
High jump	1.59 m	38th	724	37th	(1,777)
Shot put	12.81 m	29th	715	37th	(2,492)
200 metres	24.48 secs	20th	935	34th	(3,427)
Long jump	5.77 m	29th	780	31st	(4,207)
Javelin	47.38 m	11th	809	30th	(5,016) Personal Best
800 metres	2:18:78	23rd	840	27th	(5,856)
Heptathlon			5,856	27th	

== Other ventures ==
In 2015 Hazel competed on The Chase and a celebrity Christmas special edition of Ninja Warrior UK.

In 2017 Hazel appeared on a charity edition of MTVs The Challenge, titled The Challenge: Champs vs. Pros. She competed to raise money for Save the Children. In 2018, she returned to the MTVs The Challenge spinoff, titled The Challenge: Champs vs. Stars.
