= Dace Ruskule =

Latvian discus thrower (born 1981)

Personal information
- Full name: Dace Ruskule
- Nationality: Latvia
- Born: 20 September 1981 (age 44) Bauska, Latvian SSR, Soviet Union
- Height: 1.80 m (5 ft 11 in)
- Weight: 81 kg (179 lb)

Sport
- Sport: Athletics
- Event: Discus throw
- College team: Nebraska Cornhuskers (USA)
- Club: Bauska LSPA
- Coached by: Guntars Gailītis

Achievements and titles
- Personal best: Discus throw: 59.68 (2004)

Dace Ruskule (born September 20, 1981) is a retired Latvian discus thrower. She represented her nation Latvia at the 2004 Summer Olympics, and later became a titleholder in women's discus throw at the 2006 NCAA Track and Field Championships in Sacramento, California, representing her collegiate team Nebraska Cornhuskers in the United States.

Ruskule qualified for the women's discus throw at the 2004 Summer Olympics in Athens, by achieving a personal best of 59.68 from the Latvian Championships in Riga. She threw a discus with a satisfying distance of 57.43 metres on her second attempt in the prelims, but fell short to compete for the final round with a twenty-eighth overall place effort.
