= 2024 European Athletics Championships – Women's heptathlon =

Women's heptathlon at the 2024 European Athletics Championships
- Venue: Stadio Olimpico
- Location: Rome
- Dates: 7 June; 8 June
- Competitors: 24 from 14 nations
- Winning points: 6848 WL

Medalists
gold medal	Nafissatou Thiam	Belgium
silver medal	Auriana Lazraq-Khlass	France
bronze medal	Noor Vidts	Belgium

The women's heptathlon at the 2024 European Athletics Championships took place at the Stadio Olimpico on 7 and 8 June.

== Records ==
Standing records prior to the 2024 European Athletics Championships
World record	Jackie Joyner-Kersee (USA)	7291 pts	Seoul, South Korea	24 September 1988
European record	Carolina Klüft (SWE)	7032 pts	Osaka, Japan	26 August 2007
Championship record	Jessica Ennis (GBR)	6823 pts	Barcelona, Spain	31 July 2010
World Leading	Anouk Vetter (NED)	6642 pts	Götzis, Austria	19 May 2024
Europe Leading	Anouk Vetter (NED)	6642 pts	Götzis, Austria	19 May 2024

== Schedule ==
Date	Time	Round
7 June 2024	9:40	100 metres hurdles
7 June 2024	11:35	High jump
7 June 2024	18:40	Shot put
7 June 2024	21:45	200 metres
8 June 2024	12:10	Long jump
8 June 2024	18:05	Javelin throw
8 June 2024	21:55	800 metres

All times are local times (UTC+2)

== Results ==
=== 100 metres hurdles ===
Wind:
Heat 1: -0.3 m/s, Heat 2: -0.1 m/s, Heat 3: +0.7 m/s

Rank	Heat	Name	Nationality	Time	Notes	Points
1	3	Annik Kälin	Switzerland	13.14		1103
2	3	Noor Vidts	Belgium	13.16	PB	1100
2	3	Lovisa Karlsson	Sweden	13.16		1100
4	3	Beatrice Juškevičiūtė	Lithuania	13.18		1097
5	2	Sveva Gerevini	Italy	13.35	PB	1072
5	1	Auriana Lazraq-Khlass	France	13.35	PB	1072
7	2	Carolin Schäfer	Germany	13.39	SB	1066
8	3	Jana Koščak	Croatia	13.40	SB	1065
9	2	Isabel Posch	Austria	13.56	SB	1041
10	2	Sophie Weißenberg	Germany	13.58	SB	1039
11	3	Saga Vanninen	Finland	13.60		1036
12	2	Xénia Krizsán	Hungary	13.62	SB	1033
13	3	Katarina Johnson-Thompson	Great Britain	13.66	SB	1027
14	2	Jade O'Dowda	Great Britain	13.70	SB	1021
15	1	Rita Nemes	Hungary	13.71		1020
16	2	Nafissatou Thiam	Belgium	13.74	SB	1015
17	2	Sofie Dokter	Netherlands	13.77		1011
18	1	Verena Mayr	Austria	13.93		988
19	1	Paulina Ligarska	Poland	13.96		984
19	1	Yuliya Loban	Ukraine	13.96	SB	984
21	1	Szabina Szűcs	Hungary	14.04		973
22	1	Vanessa Grimm	Germany	14.09		966
23	1	Bianca Salming	Sweden	14.48	SB	912
	3	Marijke Esselink	Netherlands	DNS		

=== High jump ===
Rank	Group	Name	Nationality	1.56	1.59	1.62	1.65	1.68	1.71	1.74	1.77	1.80	1.83	1.86	1.89	1.92	1.95	1.98	Result	Points	Notes	Total
	A	Nafissatou Thiam	Belgium	-	-	-	-	-	-	-	-	o	o	o	o	o	o	xr	1.95	1171	SB	2186
	A	Katarina Johnson-Thompson	Great Britain	-	-	-	-	-	-	-	o	o	o	xxx					1.83	1016		2043
	A	Jade O'Dowda	Great Britain	-	-	-	o	o	o	xxo	xxo	xxo	xxo	r					1.83	1016	SB	2037
	A	Sofie Dokter	Netherlands	-	-	-	-	-	o	o	xxo	o	xxx						1.80	978		1989
	B	Sveva Gerevini	Italy	-	-	o	o	o	o	xo	xo	o	xxx						1.80	978	PB	2050
	A	Noor Vidts	Belgium	-	-	-	-	o	o	o	o	xo	xxx						1.80	978		2078
	A	Jana Košćak	Croatia	-	-	-	o	-	o	o	xo	xxo	xxx						1.80	978		2043
	A	Bianca Salming	Sweden	-	-	-	-	o	o	o	o	xxx							1.77	941		1853
	B	Auriana Lazraq-Khlass	France	-	-	-	xo	o	o	xo	o	xxx							1.77	941	=PB	2013
	A	Rita Nemes	Hungary	-	-	-	o	o	o	xxo	xxo	xxx							1.77	941		1961
	B	Lovisa Karlsson	Sweden	-	-	o	-	o	xo	xo	xxx								1.74	903	SB	2003
	B	Xénia Krizsán	Hungary	-	xo	o	o	xo	xo	xo	r								1.74	903	SB	1936
	A	Szabina Szűcs	Hungary	-	o	o	o	o	xo	xxo	xxx								1.74	903		1876
	B	Carolin Schäfer	Germany	-	-	-	o	o	o	xxx									1.71	867	SB	1933
	B	Vanessa Grimm	Germany	-	-	o	o	xo	o	xxx									1.71	867		1833
	B	Verena Mayr	Austria	-	-	o	xo	o	o	xxx									1.71	867		1855
	B	Annik Kälin	Switzerland				o	xxo	o	xxx									1.71	867	SB	1970
	B	Paulina Ligarska	Poland	-	-	-	o	o	xxo	xxx									1.71	867		1851
	B	Yuliya Loban	Ukraine	-	-	o	o	o	xxo	xxx									1.71	867		1851
	A	Saga Vanninen	Finland	-	-	-	-	xxo	xxx										1.68	830		1866
	B	Isabel Posch	Austria	o	o	o	xo	xxo	xxx										1.68	830	SB	1871
	B	Beatrice Juškevičiūtė	Lithuania	o	o	o	o	xxx											1.65	795		1892
	A	Sophie Weißenberg	Germany	-	-	-	-	-	xxo	xxx									1.71	867		1906
	B	Marijke Esselink	Netherlands																			

=== Shot put ===
Rank	Group	Name	Nationality	#1	#2	#3	Result	Notes	Points	Total
1	B	Auriana Lazraq-Khlass	France	15.27	r		15.27	879	PB	2892
2	A	Nafissatou Thiam	Belgium	14.98	15.06	14.26	15.06	865	SB	3051
3	A	Noor Vidts	Belgium	14.07	14.79	13.91	14.79	847	PB	2925
4	A	Paulina Ligarska	Poland	13.92	14.51	13.64	14.51	828		2679
5	A	Xénia Krizsán	Hungary	13.57	14.03	13.78	14.03	796	SB	2732
6	A	Rita Nemes	Hungary	13.55	12.92	13.86	13.86	785		2746
7	B	Sophie Weißenberg	Germany	x	12.96	13.84	13.84	783	SB	2689
8	B	Sofie Dokter	Netherlands	13.71	13.57	13.58	13.71	775		2764
9	A	Annik Kälin	Switzerland	13.28	13.61	x	13.61	768		2738
10	A	Vanessa Grimm	Germany	13.59	x	x	13.59	767		2600
11	B	Beatrice Juškevičiūtė	Lithuania	x	13.33	12.81	13.33	749		2641
12	A	Bianca Salming	Sweden	x	13.22	13.09	13.22	742		2595
13	A	Yuliya Loban	Ukraine	12.86	12.65	13.05	13.05	731		2582
14	B	Jade O'Dowda	Great Britain	12.44	12.11	12.82	12.82	715		2752
15	B	Szabina Szűcs	Hungary	12.58	12.24	12.60	12.60	701		2577
16	B	Isabel Posch	Austria	12.32	12.50	x	12.50	694		2565
17	B	Katarina Johnson-Thompson	Great Britain	11.69	12.44	12.14	12.44	690		2733
18	B	Sveva Gerevini	Italy	12.37	x	12.30	12.37	686		2736
19	B	Lovisa Karlsson	Sweden	10.93	11.15	12.28	12.28	680		2683
20	B	Jana Košćak	Croatia	11.90	11.67	12.16	12.16	672		2715
	A	Carolin Schäfer	Germany	x	x	x	NM	0		1933
	A	Saga Vanninen	Finland				DNS			
	A	Verena Mayr	Austria				DNS			
	B	Marijke Esselink	Netherlands				DNS			

=== 200 metres ===
Wind:
Heat 1: +0.8 m/s, Heat 2: +0.3 m/s, Heat 3: +0.1 m/s

Rank	Heat	Name	Nationality	Time	Notes	Points	Total
1	3	Sophie Weißenberg	Germany	23.53		1026	3715
2	3	Auriana Lazraq-Khlass	France	23.56	PB	1023	3915
3	3	Sofie Dokter	Netherlands	23.72	SB	1008	3772
4	1	Sveva Gerevini	Italy	23.81	PB	999	3735
5	2	Noor Vidts	Belgium	23.85	SB	995	3920
6	3	Annik Kälin	Switzerland	23.96		985	3723
7	2	Lovisa Karlsson	Sweden	23.99	PB	982	3665
8	3	Isabel Posch	Austria	24.06	SB	975	3540
9	3	Beatričė Juškevičiūtė	Lithuania	24.09		972	3613
10	2	Nafissatou Thiam	Belgium	24.81	SB	904	3955
11	2	Jade O'Dowda	United Kingdom	24.82	SB	903	3655
12	2	Vanessa Grimm	Germany	24.94		892	3492
13	2	Paulina Ligarska	Poland	24.96		890	3569
14	1	Szabina Szűcs	Hungary	24.97	SB	890	3467
15	2	Jana Koščak	Croatia	25.12		876	3591
16	1	Xénia Krizsán	Hungary	25.23	SB	866	3598
17	1	Rita Nemes	Hungary	25.38	SB	852	3598
18	1	Bianca Salming	Sweden	26.74		734	3329
	1	Yuliya Loban	Ukraine	DNS			
	1	Verena Mayr	Austria	DNS			
	2	Saga Vanninen	Finland	DNS			
	3	Carolin Schäfer	Germany	DNS			
	3	Katarina Johnson-Thompson	United Kingdom	DNS			

=== Long jump ===
Rank	Group	Name	Nationality	#1	#2	#3	Result	Notes	Points	Total
1	A	Annik Kälin	Switzerland	6.84	6.69	6.72	6.84	CHB	1119	4842
2	A	Nafissatou Thiam	Belgium	6.59	6.45	x	6.59	SB	1036	4991
3	A	Jade O'Dowda	Great Britain	6.44	x	6.48	6.48	SB	1001	4656
4	A	Noor Vidts	Belgium	6.33	6.46	x	6.46		994	4914
5	A	Sophie Weißenberg	Germany	6.41	6.29	x	6.41	SB	978	4693
6	A	Lovisa Karlsson	Sweden	6.40	x	x	6.40		975	4640
7	B	Auriana Lazraq-Khlass	France	5.93	6.35	x	6.35	SB	959	4874
8	B	Sveva Gerevini	Italy	6.33	x	x	6.33	SB	953	4688
9	B	Rita Nemes	Hungary	6.30	6.31	x	6.31	PB	946	4544
10	B	Xénia Krizsán	Hungary	5.89	6.07	6.31	6.31	SB	946	4544
11	B	Sofie Dokter	Netherlands	6.30	x	6.26	6.30		943	4715
12	A	Szabina Szűcs	Hungary	6.18	6.23	6.09	6.23		921	4388
13	A	Jana Košćak	Croatia	x	6.19	6.21	6.21		915	4506
14	B	Vanessa Grimm	Germany	x	x	6.13	6.13		890	4382
15	A	Isabel Posch	Austria	6.00	6.08	x	6.08		874	4414
16	B	Paulina Ligarska	Poland	5.74	6.07	x	6.07	SB	871	4440
17	B	Beatričė Juškevičiūtė	Lithuania	5.92	5.39	6.00	6.00		850	4463
	B	Bianca Salming	Sweden	DNS						

=== Javelin throw ===
Rank	Group	Name	Nationality	#1	#2	#3	Result	Notes	Points	Total
1	A	Nafissatou Thiam	Belgium	53.00	50.40	51.50	53.00	SB	918	5909
2	B	Auriana Lazraq-Khlass	France	43.83	48.23	44.44	48.23	PB	826	5700
3	A	Sofie Dokter	Netherlands	41.98	45.85	47.17	47.17	PB	805	5520
4	A	Vanessa Grimm	Germany	45.56	r		45.56	SB	774	5156
5	A	Annik Kälin	Switzerland	42.61	45.46	x	45.46		772	5614
6	B	Isabel Posch	Austria	45.08	43.59	42.02	45.08	SB	765	5179
7	A	Xénia Krizsán	Hungary	44.57	x	44.98	44.98	SB	763	5307
8	B	Sveva Gerevini	Italy	34.25	43.65	x	43.65	PB	737	5425
9	B	Jana Košćak	Croatia	41.00	42.66	x	42.66	SB	718	5224
10	A	Rita Nemes	Hungary	41.84	40.00	42.56	42.56		716	5260
11	B	Jade O'Dowda	Great Britain	41.54	42.33	41.64	42.33	SB	712	5368
12	B	Noor Vidts	Belgium	42.12	40.93	42.07	42.12	PB	708	5622
13	A	Beatričė Juškevičiūtė	Lithuania	39.55	41.47	41.07	41.47		696	5159
14	A	Paulina Ligarska	Poland	40.64	40.56	38.98	40.64		680	5120
15	B	Szabina Szűcs	Hungary	39.26	–	x	39.26		653	5041
16	B	Lovisa Karlsson	Sweden	37.85	x	37.16	37.85		626	5266
	A	Sophie Weißenberg	Germany	DNS						

=== 800 metres ===
Rank	Name	Nationality	Time	Notes	Points	Total
1	Noor Vidts	Belgium	2:09.35	SB	974	6596
2	Sveva Gerevini	Italy	2:10.75	SB	954	6379
3	Jade O'Dowda	Great Britain	2:11.30	PB	946	6314
4	Nafissatou Thiam	Belgium	2:11.79	PB	939	6848
5	Auriana Lazraq-Khlass	France	2:12.07	PB	935	6635
6	Szabina Szűcs	Hungary	2:12.80		924	5965
7	Rita Nemes	Hungary	2:13.50		914	6174
8	Paulina Ligarska	Poland	2:13.52	SB	914	6034
9	Xénia Krizsán	Hungary	2:13.74	SB	911	6218
10	Sofie Dokter	Netherlands	2:14.63		898	6418
11	Lovisa Karlsson	Sweden	2:15.94	PB	880	6146
12	Vanessa Grimm	Germany	2:15.94		880	6036
13	Annik Kälin	Switzerland	2:16.17	SB	876	6490
14	Beatričė Juškevičiūtė	Lithuania	2:16.88		866	6025
15	Isabel Posch	Austria	2:22.06	SB	796	5975
16	Jana Košćak	Croatia	2:25.31		753	5977

== Final standings ==
The final standings were as follows:

The highest mark recorded in each event is highlighted in yellow

Rank	Name	Country	100mh	HJ	SP	200m	LJ	JT	800m	Points	Notes
1st place, gold medalist(s)	Nafissatou Thiam	Belgium	1015; 13.74	1171; 1.95	865; 15.06	904; 24.81	1036; 6.59	918; 53.00	939; 2:11.79	6848	CR
2nd place, silver medalist(s)	Auriana Lazraq-Khlass	France	1072; 13.35	941; 1.77	879; 15.27	1023; 23.56	959; 6.35	826; 48.23	935; 2:12.07	6635	PB
3rd place, bronze medalist(s)	Noor Vidts	Belgium	1100; 13.16	978; 1.80	847; 14.79	995; 23.85	994; 6.46	708; 42.12	974; 2:09.35	6596	PB
4	Annik Kälin	Switzerland	1103; 13.14	867; 1.71	768; 13.61	985; 23.96	1119; 6.84	772; 45.46	876; 2:16.17	6490	
5	Sofie Dokter	Netherlands	1011; 13.77	978; 1.80	775; 13.71	1008; 23.72	943; 6.30	805; 47.17	898; 2:14.63	6418	EU23L
6	Sveva Gerevini	Italy	1072; 13.35	978; 1.80	686; 12.37	999; 23.81	953; 6.33	737; 43.65	954; 2:10.75	6379	NR
7	Jade O'Dowda	Great Britain	1021; 13.70	1016; 1.83	715; 12.82	903; 24.82	1001; 6.48	712; 42.33	946; 2:11.30	6314	PB
8	Xénia Krizsán	Hungary	1033; 13.62	903; 1.74	796; 14.03	866; 25.23	946; 6.31	763; 44.98	911; 2:13.74	6218	SB
9	Rita Nemes	Hungary	1020; 13.71	941; 1.77	785; 13.86	852; 25.38	946; 6.31	716; 42.56	914; 2:13.50	6174	
10	Lovisa Karlsson	Sweden	1100; 13.16	903; 1.74	680; 12.28	982; 23.99	975; 6.40	626; 37.85	880; 2:15.84	6146	PB
11	Vanessa Grimm	Germany	966; 14.09	867; 1.71	767; 13.59	892; 24.94	890; 6.13	774; 45.56	880; 2:15.94	6036	
12	Paulina Ligarska	Poland	984; 13.96	867; 1.71	828; 14.51	890; 24.96	871; 6.07	680; 40.64	914; 2:13.52	6034	
13	Beatričė Juškevičiūtė	Lithuania	1097; 13.18	795; 1.65	749; 13.33	972; 24.09	850; 6.00	696; 41.47	866; 2:16.88	6025	
14	Jana Košćak	Croatia	1065; 13.40	978; 1.80	672; 12.16	876; 25.12	915; 6.21	718; 42.66	753; 2:25.31	5977	WU20L
15	Isabel Posch	Austria	1041; 13.56	830; 1.68	694; 12.50	975; 24.06	874; 6.08	765; 45.08	796; 2:22.06	5975	SB
16	Szabina Szűcs	Hungary	973; 14.04	903; 1.74	701; 12.60	890; 24.97	921; 6.23	653; 39.26	924; 2:12.80	5965	
	Sophie Weißenberg	Germany	1039; 13.58	867; 1.71	783; 13.84	1026; 23.53	978; 6.41	DNS			DNF
	Bianca Salming	Sweden	912; 14.48	941; 1.77	742; 13.22	734; 26.74	DNS				DNF
	Katarina Johnson-Thompson	Great Britain	1027; 13.66	1016; 1.83	690; 12.44	DNS					DNF
	Yuliya Loban	Ukraine	974; 13.96	867; 1.71	731; 13.05	DNS					DNF
	Carolin Schäfer	Germany	1066; 13.39	867; 1.71	NM	DNS					DNF
	Saga Vanninen	Finland	1036; 13.60	830; 1.68	DNS						DNF
	Verena Mayr	Austria	988; 13.93	867; 1.71	DNS						DNF
	Marijke Esselink	Netherlands	DNS								
