= 2025 European Athletics Indoor Championships – Women's pentathlon =

Women's pentathlon at the 2025 European Athletics Indoor Championships
- Venue: Omnisport Apeldoorn
- Location: Apeldoorn, Netherlands
- Dates: 9 March 2025
- Competitors: 14 from 12 nations
- Winning mark: 4922 points

Medalists
gold medal	Saga Vanninen	Finland
silver medal	Sofie Dokter	Netherlands
bronze medal	Katherine O'Connor	Ireland

The women's pentathlon at the 2025 European Athletics Indoor Championships was held on the short track of Omnisport in Apeldoorn, Netherlands, on 9 March 2025. This was the 17th time the event is contested at the European Athletics Indoor Championships. Athletes can qualify by achieving the entry standard or by their World Athletics Ranking in the event.

The 60 metres hurdles, high jump and shot put are scheduled for 9 March during the morning session. The long jump and 800 metres are scheduled for 9 March during the evening session.

== Background ==
The women's pentathlon was contested 16 times before 2025, at every previous edition of the European Athletics Indoor Championships since 1992. The 2025 European Athletics Indoor Championships will be held in Omnisport Apeldoorn in Apeldoorn, Netherlands. The removable indoor athletics track was retopped for these championships in September 2024.

Nafissatou Thiam is the world and European record holder in the event, with a score of 5055 points, set at the 2023 championships.

Records before the 2025 European Athletics Indoor Championships
Record	Athlete (nation)	Score (pts)	Location	Date
World record	Nafissatou Thiam (BEL)	5055	Istanbul, Turkey	3 March 2023
European record	Nafissatou Thiam (BEL)	5055	Istanbul, Turkey	3 March 2023
Championship record	Nafissatou Thiam (BEL)	5055	Istanbul, Turkey	3 March 2023
World leading	Saga Vanninen (FIN)	4843	Tallinn, Estonia	2 February 2025
European leading	Saga Vanninen (FIN)	4843	Tallinn, Estonia	2 February 2025

== Qualification ==
For the women's pentathlon, the qualification period runs from 25 February 2024 until 23 February 2025. Athletes can qualify by achieving the entry standards of 4600 points or by achieving the entry standard of 6650 points outdoor in the heptathlon. Athletes can also qualify by virtue of their World Athletics Ranking for the event. There is a target number of 14 athletes.

== Results ==
=== 60 metres hurdles ===
The 60 metres hurdles was held on 9 March, starting at 9:00 (UTC+1) in the morning.

Rank	Heat	Athlete	Nationality	Time	Notes	Points
1	2	Beatrice Juškevičiūtė	Lithuania	8.18		1088
2	2	Saga Vanninen	Finland	8.19	PB	1086
3	2	Lovisa Karlsson	Sweden	8.20		1084
4	1	Sofie Dokter	Netherlands	8.26	PB	1070
5	2	Sveva Gerevini	Italy	8.26	PB	1070
6	1	Emma Oosterwegel	Netherlands	8.27	PB	1068
7	1	Jade O'Dowda	Great Britain	8.30	PB	1061
8	2	Kate O'Connor	Ireland	8.31	PB	1059
9	2	Marijke Esselink	Netherlands	8.42		1035
10	2	Célia Perron	France	8.46		1026
11	1	Yuliya Loban	Ukraine	8.48	SB	1021
12	2	Sandrina Sprengel	Germany	8.50		1017
13	1	Paulina Ligarska	Poland	8.56		1004
14	1	Verena Mayr	Austria	8.66	SB	982

=== High jump ===
The high jump was held on 9 March, starting at 9:50 (UTC+1) in the morning.

Rank	Athlete	Nationality	1.60	1.63	1.66	1.69	1.72	1.75	1.78	1.81	1.84	1.87	1.90	Result	Points	Note	Total
1	Jade O'Dowda	Great Britain	−	o	o	o	xo	o	o	xo	xo	xxo	xxr	1.87	1067	PB	2128
2	Sofie Dokter	Netherlands	−	−	−	o	o	o	xo	xo	o	xxx		1.84	1029	SB	2099
3	Kate O'Connor	Ireland	−	−	o	o	o	xxo	o	xxo	xo	xxx		1.84	1029	PB	2088
4	Saga Vanninen	Finland	−	−	−	o	o	o	o	xo	xr			1.81	991	PB	2077
5	Célia Perron	France	−	−	−	o	o	xxo	xo	xxx				1.78	953	=SB	1979
6	Paulina Ligarska	Poland	−	−	o	o	o	o	xxx					1.75	916		1920
7	Sveva Gerevini	Italy	o	o	o	o	o	xxx						1.72	879		1949
8	Emma Oosterwegel	Netherlands	o	o	xo	o	xo	xxx						1.72	879	SB	1947
9	Verena Mayr	Austria	−	o	o	xxo	xo	xxx						1.72	879	SB	1861
10	Sandrina Sprengel	Germany	−	−	o	o	xxx							1.69	842	SB	1859
11	Marijke Esselink	Netherlands	o	o	o	xxo	xxx							1.69	842	=SB	1877
12	Beatrice Juškevičiūtė	Lithuania	o	o	xo	xxo	xxx							1.69	842	SB	1930
13	Lovisa Karlsson	Sweden	o	o	o	xxx								1.66	806		1890
13	Yuliya Loban	Ukraine	o	o	o	xxx								1.66	806		1827

=== Shot put ===
The shot put was held on 9 March, starting at 12:21 (UTC+1) in the afternoon.

Rank	Athlete	Nationality	#1	#2	#3	Result	Points	Note	Total
1	Saga Vanninen	Finland	14.49	15.26	15.56	15.56	898	SB	2975
2	Yuliya Loban	Ukraine	x	14.98	x	14.98	860	SB	2687
3	Paulina Ligarska	Poland	14.10	14.48	x	14.48	826	SB	2746
4	Kate O'Connor	Ireland	14.08	14.32	13.95	14.32	815		2903
5	Sandrina Sprengel	Germany	13.60	14.22	13.95	14.22	809	PB	2668
6	Beatrice Juškevičiūtė	Lithuania	13.98	13.60	13.61	13.98	793	SB	2723
7	Sofie Dokter	Netherlands	13.86	12.90	13.33	13.86	785	SB	2884
8	Verena Mayr	Austria	13.71	13.80	13.75	13.80	781		2642
9	Jade O'Dowda	Great Britain	13.46	13.26	12.88	13.46	758	PB	2886
10	Marijke Esselink	Netherlands	x	12.66	13.46	13.46	758		2635
11	Emma Oosterwegel	Netherlands	11.95	x	13.22	13.22	742		2689
12	Sveva Gerevini	Italy	12.91	x	13.00	13.00	727	PB	2676
13	Lovisa Karlsson	Sweden	12.78	12.68	12.66	12.78	713		2603
14	Célia Perron	France	11.80	11.98	12.20	12.20	674		2653

=== Long jump ===
The long jump was held on 9 March, starting at 15:10 (UTC+1) in the afternoon.

Rank	Athlete	Nationality	#1	#2	#3	Result	Points	Note	Total
1	Sofie Dokter	Netherlands	6.35	6.61	x	6.61	1043	PB	3927
2	Saga Vanninen	Finland	6.18	6.52	6.28	6.52	1014	PB	3989
3	Jade O'Dowda	Great Britain	6.43	6.33	x	6.43	985	=SB	3871
4	Kate O'Connor	Ireland	6.05	6.27	4.59	6.27	934	PB	3837
5	Sandrina Sprengel	Germany	4.45	x	6.27	6.27	934		3602
6	Lovisa Karlsson	Sweden	x	6.23	6.11	6.23	921		3524
7	Sveva Gerevini	Italy	6.11	6.20	5.87	6.20	912	SB	3588
8	Paulina Ligarska	Poland	6.15	6.14	x	6.15	896	PB	3642
9	Beatrice Juškevičiūtė	Lithuania	x	5.88	5.62	5.88	813	SB	3536
10	Yuliya Loban	Ukraine	5.86	5.86	5.59	5.86	807		3494
11	Emma Oosterwegel	Netherlands	x	5.74	5.86	5.86	807		3496
12	Célia Perron	France	x	x	5.78	5.78	783		3436
13	Verena Mayr	Austria	5.68	5.70	x	5.70	759		3401
14	Marijke Esselink	Netherlands	5.68	x	5.45	5.68	753	SB	3388

=== 800 metres ===
The 800 metres was held on 9 March, starting at 18:03 (UTC+1) in the evening.

Rank	Athlete	Nationality	Time	Notes	Points	Total
1	Kate O'Connor	Ireland	2:11.42	PB	944	4781
2	Saga Vanninen	Finland	2:12.20		933	4922
3	Paulina Ligarska	Poland	2:12.59		927	4569
4	Célia Perron	France	2:12.65		926	4362
5	Emma Oosterwegel	Netherlands	2:14.24	PB	904	4400
6	Sofie Dokter	Netherlands	2:14.53	SB	899	4826
7	Sveva Gerevini	Italy	2:14.58		899	4487
8	Jade O'Dowda	Great Britain	2:15.91	SB	880	4751
9	Beatrice Juškevičiūtė	Lithuania	2:16.10	PB	877	4413
10	Sandrina Sprengel	Germany	2:17.83	PB	853	4455
11	Lovisa Karlsson	Sweden	2:19.29	PB	833	4357
12	Marijke Esselink	Netherlands	2:22.28		793	4181
13	Yuliya Loban	Ukraine	2:23.00	SB	783	4277

=== Final standings ===
The highest mark recorded in each event is highlighted in yellow

Rank	Athlete	Nationality	60mh	HJ	SP	LJ	800m	Total	Notes
1st place, gold medalist(s)	Saga Vanninen	Finland	8.19	1.81	15.56	6.52	2:12.20	4922	EU23R, WL, NR
2nd place, silver medalist(s)	Sofie Dokter	Netherlands	8.26	1.84	13.86	6.61	2:14.53	4826	PB
3rd place, bronze medalist(s)	Kate O'Connor	Ireland	8.31	1.84	14.32	6.27	2:11.42	4781	NR
4	Jade O'Dowda	Great Britain	8.30	1.87	13.46	6.43	2:15.91	4751	PB
5	Paulina Ligarska	Poland	8.56	1.75	14.48	6.15	2:12.59	4569	
6	Sveva Gerevini	Italy	8.26	1.72	13.00	6.20	2:14.58	4487	
7	Sandrina Sprengel	Germany	8.50	1.69	14.22	6.27	2:17.83	4455	=PB
8	Beatrice Juškevičiūtė	Lithuania	8.18	1.69	13.98	5.88	2:16.10	4413	PB
9	Emma Oosterwegel	Netherlands	8.27	1.72	13.22	5.86	2:14.24	4400	PB
10	Célia Perron	France	8.46	1.78	12.20	5.78	2:12.65	4362	
11	Lovisa Karlsson	Sweden	8.20	1.66	12.78	6.23	2:19.29	4357	
12	Yuliya Loban	Ukraine	8.48	1.66	14.98	5.86	2:23.00	4277	SB
13	Marijke Esselink	Netherlands	8.42	1.69	13.46	5.68	2:22.28	4181	SB
	Verena Mayr	Austria	8.66	1.72	13.80	5.70	DNS	DNF	
