= 2025 European Athletics U23 Championships – Women's heptathlon =

Women's heptathlon at the 2025 European Athletics U23 Championships
- Venue: Fana Stadion
- Location: Bergen, Norway
- Dates: 19 July; 20 July
- Competitors: 19 from 13 nations
- Winning score: 6563 pts CR, NR

Medalists
| gold medal | Saga Vanninen | Finland |
| silver medal | Abigail Pawlett | Great Britain |
| bronze medal | Serina Riedel | Germany |

The women's heptathlon event at the 2025 European Athletics U23 Championships was held in Bergen, Norway, at Fana Stadion on 19 and 20 July.

== Records ==
Prior to the competition, the records were as follows:

| Record | Athlete (nation) | Points | Location | Date |
|---|---|---|---|---|
| European U23 record | Carolina Klüft (SWE) | 7001 | Paris, France | 24 August 2003 |
| Championship U23 record | Aiga Grabuste (LAT) | 6396 | Kaunas, Lithuania | 19 July 2009 |

== Results ==
=== Final standings ===
The highest mark recorded in each event is highlighted in yellow

| Rank | Athlete | Nationality | 100m H | HJ | SP | 200m | LJ | JT | 800m | Points | Notes |
|---|---|---|---|---|---|---|---|---|---|---|---|
| 1st place, gold medalist(s) | Saga Vanninen | Finland | 13.25 | 1.80 | 15.09 | 24.45 | 6.49 | 43.74 | 2:11.00 | 6563 | CR, NR |
| 2nd place, silver medalist(s) | Abigail Pawlett | Great Britain | 13.06 | 1.71 | 14.53 | 23.23 | 6.21 | 40.67 | 2:17.51 | 6320 | PB |
| 3rd place, bronze medalist(s) | Serina Riedel | Germany | 13.76 | 1.71 | 13.02 | 24.11 | 6.52 | 44.42 | 2:18.95 | 6183 | |
| 4 | Anastasia Ntragkomirova | Greece | 14.19 | 1.77 | 15.57 | 25.42 | 6.14 | 48.82 | 2:30.76 | 6054 | NU23R |
| 5 | Liana Trümpi | Switzerland | 14.57 | 1.74 | 13.24 | 24.42 | 6.31 | 41.43 | 2:19.85 | 5953 | |
| 6 | Karla Schärfe | Denmark | 14.06 | 1.80 | 13.08 | 26.36 | 5.58 | 53.38 | 2:24.06 | 5865 | |
| 7 | Sofia Cosculluela | Spain | 13.56 | 1.62 | 13.08 | 24.53 | 6.09 | 40.77 | 2:20.07 | 5845 | |
| 8 | Maëva Bastien | France | 13.73 | 1.80 | 13.32 | 24.77 | 5.95 | 29.67 | 2:16.29 | 5831 | PB |
| 9 | Vilma Itälinna | Finland | 13.67 | 1.71 | 12.12 | 23.76 | 6.11 | 32.85 | 2:19.73 | 5807 | PB |
| 10 | Betty Jensen | Denmark | 14.08 | 1.65 | 13.47 | 24.46 | 5.91 | 38.24 | 2:16.75 | 5782 | |
| 11 | Adéla Tkáčová | Czech Republic | 13.87 | 1.65 | 10.68 | 24.16 | 5.85 | 42.96 | 2:15.34 | 5747 | PB |
| 12 | Melissa Wullschleger | Switzerland | 13.50 | 1.62 | 14.07 | 24.60 | 5.70 | 39.02 | 2:21.44 | 5744 | |
| 13 | Laura van den Brande | Belgium | 14.12 | 1.74 | 12.44 | 25.38 | 5.97 | 39.22 | 2:19.15 | 5733 | |
| 14 | Hanna van Baast | Netherlands | 13.50 | 1.74 | 11.59 | 24.50 | 5.81 | 39.29 | 2:26.86 | 5699 | PB |
| 15 | Linda Bichsel | Switzerland | 13.61 | 1.65 | 12.24 | 24.14 | 5.47 | 35.38 | 2:22.82 | 5529 | |
| 16 | Sennah Vanhoeijen | Belgium | 14.61 | 1.68 | 13.33 | 25.66 | 5.72 | 42.18 | 2:26.97 | 5505 | |
| 17 | Marie Jung | Germany | 14.12 | 1.65 | 11.21 | 25.34 | 5.73 | 37.62 | 2:19.63 | 5440 | |
| 18 | Carmen Nowicka | Poland | 13.98 | 1.62 | 11.64 | 24.93 | 5.89 | 31.37 | 2:18.55 | 5432 | |
| 19 | Marta Sivina | Latvia | 14.23 | 1.62 | 12.44 | 25.05 | 5.51 | 35.21 | 2:18.97 | 5394 | |
