= Sarolta Kriszt =

Hungarian heptathlete

Personal information
- Full name: Sarolta Maria Kriszt
- Born: 28 October 2006 (age 19)

Sport
- Sport: Athletics
- Event: Heptathlon

Achievements and titles
- Personal bests: Heptathlon: 6407 (Birmingham, 2026) NU20R; 400m: 52.56 (Budapest, 2024) NU20R; 400mH: 57.82 (Budapest, 2023) NU18R
Medal record
Women's athletics
Representing Hungary
European U20 Championships
Silver medal – second place	2025 Tampere	Heptathlon
European U18 Championships
Silver medal – second place	2022 Jerusalem	Heptathlon
European Youth Olympic Festival
Gold medal – first place	2023 Maribor	Heptathlon

Sarolta Maria Kriszt (born 28 October 2006) is a Hungarian multi-event athlete. In 2024, she became Hungarian national champion in the 400 metres at the Hungarian Athletics Championships. She was the silver medalist in the heptathlon at the 2025 European Athletics U20 Championships and 2022 European Athletics U18 Championships.

== Biography ==
She is a member of MATE-GEAC athletics club where she is coached by Katalin Körmendy. In July 2022, Kriszt won silver in the heptathlon at the 2022 European Athletics U18 Championships in Jerusalem, Israel finishing behind Croatian Jana Kosčak, at the age of 16 years-old.

=== 2023 ===
In February 2023 in Budapest, she became the Hungarian national youth record holder in the indoor pentathlon and the 60 metres hurdles, running 8.48 seconds and achieving a tally of 4228 points to become junior national pentathlon champion. She won the gold medal in the heptathlon at the 2023 European Youth Summer Olympic Festival in Maribor, Slovenia. She was named in the Hungarian relay pool for the 4 x 400 metres at the 2023 World Athletics Championships in Budapest.

=== 2024 ===
She was one of three recipients selected for Szentkirályi Talent Program funding in June 2024. That month, at the age of 17 years-old she was the youngest member of the Hungarian team selected for the 2024 European Athletics Championships in Rome, Italy. She ran in the women's 4 × 400 m relay at the Championships. Later that same month she won the 400 metres at the Hungarian Athletics Championships in Budapest. She competed in the heptathlon for Hungary at the 2024 World Athletics U20 Championships in Lima, Peru in August 2024 but crashed-out in the first event, the 100 metres hurdles.

=== 2025 ===
She finished in tenth place overall in the heptathlon at the Hypo-Meeting in Götzis, Austria, on 1 June 2025. She won the silver medal behind Jana Koščak of Croatia in the heptathlon at the 2025 European Athletics U20 Championships in Tampere, Finland in August 2025 with 6251 points.

=== 2026 ===
In May 2026, she competed at the Hypo-Meeting in Götzis, placing twelfth overall with 6213 points. In August, she competed at the 2026 European Athletics Championships in Birmingham, England, placing sixth overall in heptathlon.

== Personal life ==
She is from Gödöllő in Pest County, Budapest.
