= 2026 European Athletics Championships – Women's heptathlon =

Women's heptathlon at the 2026 European Athletics Championships
- Venue: Alexander Stadium
- Location: Birmingham, United Kingdom
- Dates: 14–15 August 2026
- Winning time: 6751 points

Medalists
gold medal	Kate O'Connor	Ireland
silver medal	Emma Oosterwegel	Netherlands
bronze medal	Sofie Dokter	Netherlands

The women's heptathlon at the 2026 European Athletics Championships is scheduled to take place in Birmingham, United Kingdom, on 14 and 15 August 2026.

== Background ==
Records before the 2026 European Athletics Championships
Record	Athlete (nation)	Score	Location	Date
World record	Jackie Joyner-Kersee (USA)	7291 pts	Seoul, South Korea	24 September 1988
World leading	Annik Kälin (SUI)	6819 pts	Ratingen, Germany	28 June 2026
Championship record	Nafissatou Thiam (BEL)	6848 pts	Rome, Italy	8 June 2024
European record	Carolina Klüft (SWE)	7032 pts	Osaka, Japan	26 August 2007
European leading	Annik Kälin (SUI)	6819 pts	Ratingen, Germany	28 June 2026

== Qualification ==
The qualification period was from 27 January 2025 to 26 July 2026. Athletes qualified by the entry standard of 6320 points or more, or by their position on the World Athletics Rankings for the event. The target number was 24 athletes.

Qualification standings per 31 July 2026
QP	CP	Country	Athlete	Status	Details
1	1	Switzerland	Annik Kälin	Qualified by Entry Standard	6819 - Stadionring, Ratingen (GER) - 28 JUN 2026
2	1	Ireland	Kate O'Connor	Qualified by Entry Standard	6714 - National Stadium, Tokyo (JPN) - 20 SEP 2025
3	1	Netherlands	Emma Oosterwegel	Qualified by Entry Standard	6705 - Mösle-Stadium, Götzis (AUT) - 31 MAY 2026
4	2	Netherlands	Sofie Dokter	Qualified by Entry Standard	6627 - Mösle-Stadium, Götzis (AUT) - 31 MAY 2026
5	1	Great Britain & N.I.	Katarina Johnson-Thompson	Qualified by Entry Standard	6581 - National Stadium, Tokyo (JPN) - 20 SEP 2025
6	1	Germany	Sophie Weißenberg	Qualified by Entry Standard	6449 - Mösle-Stadium, Götzis (AUT) - 31 MAY 2026
7	2	Germany	Sandrina Sprengel	Qualified by Entry Standard	6434 - National Stadium, Tokyo (JPN) - 20 SEP 2025
8	1	Poland	Adrianna Sułek-Schubert	Qualified by Entry Standard	6433 - Stadion Miejski, Nakło nad Notecią (POL) - 12 JUL 2026
9	1	Italy	Sveva Gerevini	Qualified by Entry Standard	6413 - Mösle-Stadium, Götzis (AUT) - 31 MAY 2026
10	2	Great Britain & N.I.	Jade O'Dowda	Qualified by Entry Standard	6391 - National Stadium, Tokyo (JPN) - 20 SEP 2025
11	3	Germany	Vanessa Grimm	Qualified by Entry Standard	6381 - Mösle-Stadium, Götzis (AUT) - 31 MAY 2026
12	1	Hungary	Szabina Szűcs	Qualified by Entry Standard	6340 - UTE Atlétikai Stadion, Budapest (HUN) - 14 JUN 2026
13	1	Lithuania	Beatričė Juškevičiūtė	Qualified by Entry Standard	6323 - Hilmer Lodge Stadium, Walnut, CA (USA) - 16 APR 2026
14	1	Belgium	Noor Vidts	Qualified by World Rankings	10th - 1202 points
15	1	Spain	María Vicente	Qualified by World Rankings	17th - 1168 points
16	1	Sweden	Lovisa Karlsson	Qualified by World Rankings	20th - 1160 points
17	1	Portugal	Jéssica Barreira	Qualified by World Rankings	21st - 1155 points
18	2	Hungary	Sarolta Kriszt	Qualified by World Rankings	23rd - 1150 points
19	1	Croatia	Jana Koščak	Qualified by World Rankings	24th - 1150 points
reserve	4	Germany	Anna-Elisabeth Ehlers	Qualified by World Rankings	26th - 1148 points
20	2	Sweden	Erika Wärff	Qualified by World Rankings	27th - 1144 points
21	1	Austria	Verena Mayr	Qualified by World Rankings	28th - 1141 points
22	2	Spain	Sofia Cosculluela	Qualified by World Rankings	29th - 1138 points
23	1	Greece	Anastasia Ntragkomirova	Qualified by World Rankings	30th - 1137 points
24	1	Czech Republic	Adéla Tkáčová	Qualified by World Rankings	35th - 1125 points
reserve	1	Ukraine	Tetyana Bilyk	Next best by World Rankings	37th - 1116 points
reserve	2	Austria	Sarah Lagger	Next best by World Rankings	44th - 1107 points
reserve	2	Ireland	Anna Mccauley	Next best by World Rankings	56th - 1087 points

== Schedule ==
Date	Time	Round
14 August 2026	10:35	100 metres hurdles
14 August 2026	11:25	High jump
14 August 2026	19:35	Shot put
14 August 2026	20:55	200 metres
15 August 2026	10:25	Long jump
15 August 2026	11:55	Javelin throw
15 August 2026	19:45	800 metres

All times are local times (UTC+1)

== Results ==
=== 100 metres hurdles ===
Wind:
Heat 1: −0.6 m/s, Heat 2: +1.3 m/s, Heat 3: +3.3 m/s

Rank	Heat	Lane	Name	Nationality	Time	Notes	Points
1	3	2	Annik Kälin	Switzerland	12.59		1187
2	3	5	Emma Oosterwegel	Netherlands	12.98		1127
3	3	9	Sofie Dokter	Netherlands	13.01		1123
4	3	4	Lovisa Karlsson	Sweden	13.03		1120
5	3	7	Jéssica Barreira	Portugal	13.09		1111
6	2	3	Beatričė Juškevičiūtė	Lithuania	13.09	SB	1111
7	2	5	Sveva Gerevini	Italy	13.16	PB	1100
8	2	7	Sophie Weißenberg	Germany	13.19	PB	1096
9	3	8	Jade O'Dowda	Great Britain & N.I.	13.21		1093
10	3	3	Adrianna Sułek-Schubert	Poland	13.29		1081
11	2	9	Kate O'Connor	Ireland	13.30	PB	1080
12	2	4	Sarolta Kriszt	Hungary	13.38	SB	1068
13	3	6	Noor Vidts	Belgium	13.38		1068
14	1	4	María Vicente	Spain	13.38	SB	1068
15	2	6	Sofia Cosculluela	Spain	13.42		1062
16	2	8	Vanessa Grimm	Germany	13.47		1055
17	1	2	Szabina Szűcs	Hungary	13.60	SB	1036
18	1	9	Adéla Tkáčová	Czech Republic	13.67		1026
19	1	7	Erika Wärff	Sweden	13.83		1003
20	1	3	Katarina Johnson-Thompson	Great Britain & N.I.	14.00	SB	978
21	2	2	Sandrina Sprengel	Germany	14.03		974
22	1	8	Anastasia Ntragkomirova	Greece	14.18	SB	953
23	1	5	Verena Mayr	Austria	14.27		941
24	1	6	Jana Koščak	Croatia	14.30	SB	936

=== High jump ===
Rank	Group	Name	Nationality	1.56	1.59	1.62	1.65	1.68	1.71	1.74	1.77	1.80	1.83	1.86	1.89	Result	Points	Notes	Total
1	A	Adrianna Sułek-Schubert	Poland	−	−	−	−		o	o	xo	o	xxo	o	xxx	1.86	1054	SB	2135
2	A	Kate O'Connor	Ireland	−	−	−	−	o	o	o	o	o	o	xxo	xxx	1.86	1054	=PB	2134
3	A	Jana Koščak	Croatia	−	−	−	−	−	o	o	o	xo	xo	xxx		1.83	1016	SB	1952
4	A	Katarina Johnson-Thompson	Great Britain & N.I.	−	−	−	−	−	o	o	o	xo	xxo	xxx		1.83	1016	SB	1994
5	B	Sophie Weißenberg	Germany	−	−	−	−	−	xo	o	xo	o	r			1.80	978	SB	2074
6	A	María Vicente	Spain	−	−	−	o	o	o	xo	xo	xxx				1.77	941	=SB	2009
6	B	Noor Vidts	Belgium	−	−	−	o	o	o	xo	xo	xxx				1.77	941	SB	2009
8	A	Sofie Dokter	Netherlands	−	−	−	−	−	o	o	xxx					1.74	903		2026
9	A	Anastasia Ntragkomirova	Greece	−	−	−	o	o	o	xo	xxx					1.74	903		1856
9	A	Szabina Szűcs	Hungary	−	−	−	o	−	o	xo	xxx					1.74	903		1939
11	B	Sveva Gerevini	Italy	−	−	o	o	xo	o	xo	xxx					1.74	903	=SB	2003
12	A	Emma Oosterwegel	Netherlands	−	−	−	o	o	o	xxo	xxx					1.74	903		2030
13	A	Erika Wärff	Sweden	−	−	−	xo	o	o	xxo	xxx					1.74	903		1906
14	B	Annik Kälin	Switzerland	−	−	o	o	o	o	xxx						1.71	867		2054
14	B	Sarolta Kriszt	Hungary	−	o	o	o	o	o	xxx						1.71	867	SB	1935
14	A	Jade O'Dowda	Great Britain & N.I.	−	−	−	o	o	o	xxx						1.71	867		1960
14	A	Sandrina Sprengel	Germany	−	−	−	o	o	o	xxx						1.71	867		1841
18	B	Verena Mayr	Austria	−	o	o	o	o	xxo	xxx						1.71	867	=SB	1808
18	B	Adéla Tkáčová	Czech Republic	−	o	o	o	o	xxo	xxx						1.71	867		1893
20	A	Vanessa Grimm	Germany	−	−	−	xo	o	xxo	xxx						1.71	867		1922
21	B	Lovisa Karlsson	Sweden	−	xo	o	o	xxo	xxo	xxx						1.71	867		1987
22	B	Beatričė Juškevičiūtė	Lithuania	−	o	o	xxo	xxx								1.65	795		1906
23	B	Jéssica Barreira	Portugal	o	xo	xo	xxo	xxx								1.65	795		1906
23	B	Sofia Cosculluela	Spain	o	o	xxo	xxo	xxx								1.65	795		1857

=== Shot put ===
Rank	Group	Name	Nationality	#1	#2	#3	Result	Notes	Points	Total
1	A	Jéssica Barreira	Portugal	14.71	14.79	15.02	15.02		862	2768
2	A	Anastasia Ntragkomirova	Greece	14.98	14.76	x	14.98		860	2716
3	A	Vanessa Grimm	Germany	14.94	14.84	x	14.94		857	2779
4	A	Sofie Dokter	Netherlands	14.75	14.63	x	14.75	PB	844	2870
5	A	Adrianna Sułek-Schubert	Poland	14.65	x	x	14.65		837	2972
6	A	Verena Mayr	Austria	14.23	14.18	14.63	14.63	=SB	836	2644
7	A	Sandrina Sprengel	Germany	14.30	x	14.11	14.30		814	2655
8	A	Emma Oosterwegel	Netherlands	13.90	13.52	14.26	14.26		811	2841
9	A	Noor Vidts	Belgium	13.94	14.25	13.61	14.25		811	2820
10	B	Sophie Weißenberg	Germany	12.79	13.58	14.04	14.04	SB	797	2871
11	A	Kate O'Connor	Ireland	13.46	x	13.96	13.96		791	2925
12	A	Erika Wärff	Sweden	13.69	13.92	13.46	13.92		789	2695
13	A	Beatričė Juškevičiūtė	Lithuania	13.70	x	12.91	13.70		774	2680
14	B	Jade O'Dowda	United Kingdom	13.69	12.94	13.27	13.69		773	2733
15	B	Annik Kälin	Switzerland	13.39	13.47	13.59	13.59		767	2821
16	B	Sarolta Kriszt	Hungary	12.54	x	13.26	13.26	PB	745	2680
17	B	Lovisa Karlsson	Sweden	12.36	12.77	13.25	13.25		744	2731
18	B	Szabina Szűcs	Hungary	12.91	13.23	13.13	13.23		743	2682
19	B	María Vicente	Spain	12.93	12.70	13.09	13.09		733	2742
20	B	Sveva Gerevini	Italy	12.84	12.39	12.89	12.89		720	2723
21	B	Katarina Johnson-Thompson	United Kingdom	12.79	x	12.33	12.79		713	2707
22	B	Adéla Tkáčová	Czech Republic	11.11	11.50	12.24	12.24		677	2570
23	B	Jana Koščak	Croatia	12.21	x	x	12.21	SB	675	2627
24	B	Sofia Cosculluela	Spain	11.11	11.42	11.88	11.88		653	2510

=== 200 metres ===
Wind:
Heat 1: +1.8 m/s, Heat 2: +3.4 m/s, Heat 3: +2.4 m/s

Rank	Heat	Lane	Name	Nationality	Time	Notes	Points	Total
1	3	1	Sofie Dokter	Netherlands	23.05		1074	3944
2	3	2	Sophie Weißenberg	Germany	23.39		1040	3911
3	3	3	Adéla Tkáčová	Czech Republic	23.39		1040	3610
4	3	4	Annik Kälin	Switzerland	23.54		1025	3846
5	3	5	Emma Oosterwegel	Netherlands	23.55		1024	3865
6	3	6	Sarolta Kriszt	Hungary	23.58		1021	3701
7	2	1	María Vicente	Spain	23.71		1009	3751
8	2	2	Beatričė Juškevičiūtė	Lithuania	23.73		1007	3687
9	3	7	Sveva Gerevini	Italy	23.78		1002	3725
10	2	3	Kate O'Connor	Ireland	23.79		1001	3926
11	2	4	Adrianna Sułek-Schubert	Poland	23.84		996	3968
12	2	5	Sofia Cosculluela	Spain	23.94		986	3496
13	1	1	Noor Vidts	Belgium	24.14	SB	967	3787
14	2	6	Lovisa Karlsson	Sweden	24.30		952	3683
15	2	7	Jéssica Barreira	Portugal	24.33		949	3717
16	1	2	Sandrina Sprengel	Germany	24.34		948	3603
17	3	8	Katarina Johnson-Thompson	Great Britain & N.I.	24.46		937	3644
18	1	3	Jade O'Dowda	Great Britain & N.I.	24.51		932	3665
19	2	8	Szabina Szűcs	Hungary	24.57		927	3609
20	1	4	Vanessa Grimm	Germany	24.63		921	3700
21	1	5	Erika Wärff	Sweden	24.85		901	3596
22	1	6	Verena Mayr	Austria	25.53	SB	839	3483
	1		Jana Koščak	Croatia	Did not start			DNF
	1		Anastasia Ntragkomirova	Greece	Did not start			DNF

=== Long jump ===
Rank	Group	Name	Nationality	#1	#2	#3	Result	Notes	Points	Total
1	A	Annik Kälin	Switzerland	x	6.81	6.67	6.81		1109	4955
2	A	Sophie Weißenberg	Germany	6.56	x	6.11	6.56		1027	4938
3	A	Kate O'Connor	Ireland	6.55	6.26	x	6.55	PB	1023	4949
4	A	Sofie Dokter	Netherlands	x	6.39	6.51	6.51		1010	4954
5	A	Emma Oosterwegel	Netherlands	5.78	6.18	6.50	6.50	PB	1007	4872
6	A	Sarolta Kriszt	Hungary	6.44	6.21	6.17	6.44		988	4689
7	B	María Vicente	Spain	6.08	6.30	6.42	6.42	SB	981	4732
8	A	Sofia Cosculluela	Spain	6.21	6.39	6.17	6.39		972	4468
9	A	Jade O'Dowda	Great Britain & N.I.	6.35	6.11	6.25	6.35		959	4624
10	B	Beatričė Juškevičiūtė	Lithuania	6.00	x	6.33	6.33	PB	953	4640
11	B	Sveva Gerevini	Italy	5.83	5.85	6.25	6.25		927	4652
12	B	Adrianna Sułek-Schubert	Poland	x	x	6.23	6.23		921	4889
13	B	Noor Vidts	Belgium	6.15	x	6.22	6.22	SB	918	4705
14	B	Sandrina Sprengel	Germany	6.00	6.20	6.07	6.20		912	4515
15	A	Lovisa Karlsson	Sweden	x	6.08	5.98	6.08		874	4557
16	A	Jéssica Barreira	Portugal	6.06	x	x	6.06		868	4585
17	B	Adéla Tkáčová	Czech Republic	5.97	5.85	6.00	6.00		850	4460
18	B	Erika Wärff	Sweden	5.95	5.80	x	5.95		834	4430
19	B	Verena Mayr	Austria	5.82	5.87	5.70	5.87	SB	810	4293
20	B	Vanessa Grimm	Germany	5.72	x	5.84	5.84		801	4501
21	B	Katarina Johnson-Thompson	Great Britain & N.I.	5.77	r		5.77		780	4424
	A	Szabina Szűcs	Hungary	x	x	x	NM		0	3609

=== Javelin throw ===
Rank	Name	Nationality	#1	#2	#3	Result	Notes	Points	Total
1	Emma Oosterwegel	Netherlands	50.01	51.49	x	51.49		889	5761
2	Jéssica Barreira	Portugal	51.19	x	47.86	51.19		883	5468
3	Kate O'Connor	Ireland	50.16	49.96	x	50.16		863	5812
4	Erika Wärff	Sweden	47.14	46.86	43.32	47.14		805	5235
5	Beatričė Juškevičiūtė	Lithuania	44.10	47.10	x	47.10	SB	804	5444
6	Sarolta Kriszt	Hungary	46.67	43.71	45.29	46.67		796	5485
7	Sofie Dokter	Netherlands	43.67	46.20	45.35	46.20	SB	787	5741
8	Sveva Gerevini	Italy	45.32	45.41	x	45.41		771	5423
9	Annik Kälin	Switzerland	44.39	41.84	42.06	44.39		752	5707
10	Sophie Weißenberg	Germany	44.34	43.04	43.43	44.34		751	5689
11	María Vicente	Spain	40.84	39.59	44.02	44.02	SB	745	5477
12	Vanessa Grimm	Germany	43.87	x	43.64	43.87	SB	742	5243
13	Sofia Cosculluela	Spain	30.42	42.94	40.16	42.94		724	5192
14	Verena Mayr	Austria	40.01	41.47	42.10	42.10		708	5001
15	Jade O'Dowda	Great Britain & N.I.	39.30	39.77	41.56	41.56		697	5321
16	Sandrina Sprengel	Germany	40.22	x	40.84	40.84		683	5198
17	Noor Vidts	Belgium	35.00	37.34	40.33	40.33		674	5379
18	Szabina Szűcs	Hungary	39.44	34.54	x	39.44		657	4266
19	Lovisa Karlsson	Sweden	38.57	38.89	x	38.89		646	5203
20	Katarina Johnson-Thompson	Great Britain & N.I.	36.69	36.92	36.26	36.92	SB	608	5032
21	Adrianna Sułek-Schubert	Poland	x	36.19	x	36.19		594	5483
22	Adéla Tkáčová	Czech Republic	30.11	x	-	30.11		479	4939

=== 800 metres ===
Rank	Heat	Name	Nationality	Time	Notes	Points
1	2	Emma Oosterwegel	Netherlands	2:10.87		952
2	2	Sveva Gerevini	Italy	2:11.11		948
3	2	Kate O'Connor	Ireland	2:11.74		939
4	2	Annik Kälin	Switzerland	2:12.87		923
5	2	Sofie Dokter	Netherlands	2:12.90		923
6	2	Sarolta Kriszt	Hungary	2:12.93		922
7	1	Adéla Tkáčová	Czech Republic	2:13.07		920
8	1	Noor Vidts	Belgium	2:14.01		907
9	1	Verena Mayr	Austria	2:14.16	SB	905
10	2	María Vicente	Spain	2:14.81	SB	895
11	2	Adrianna Sułek-Schubert	Poland	2:15.05		892
12	1	Vanessa Grimm	Germany	2:16.17		876
13	1	Jade O'Dowda	Great Britain & N.I.	2:16.62		870
14	2	Beatričė Juškevičiūtė	Lithuania	2:17.05		864
15	1	Sandrina Sprengel	Germany	2:17.41		859
16	1	Lovisa Karlsson	Sweden	2:20.23		820
17	1	Sofia Cosculluela	Spain	2:21.20		807
18	2	Sophie Weißenberg	Germany	2:21.22		807
19	1	Erika Wärff	Sweden	2:23.46		777
20	1	Katarina Johnson-Thompson	Great Britain & N.I.	2:24.92	SB	758
21	2	Jéssica Barreira	Portugal	2:26.18		742
	1	Szabina Szűcs	Hungary	Did not start		

=== Overall standings ===
The standings were as follows (after 6 out of 7 events):

The highest mark recorded in each event is highlighted in yellow

Place	Athlete	Nation	100mh	HJ	SP	200m	LJ	JT	800m	Points	Notes
1st place, gold medalist(s)	Kate O'Connor	Ireland	1080; 13.30	1054; 1.86	791; 13.96	1001; 23.79	1023; 6.55	863; 50.16	939; 2:11.74	6751	NR
2nd place, silver medalist(s)	Emma Oosterwegel	Netherlands	1127; 12.98	903; 1.74	811; 14.26	1024; 23.55	1007; 6.50	889; 51.49	952; 2:10.87	6713	PB
3rd place, bronze medalist(s)	Sofie Dokter	Netherlands	1123; 13.01	903; 1.74	844; 14.75	1074; 23.05	1010; 6.51	787; 46.20	923; 2:12.90	6664	PB
4	Annik Kälin	Switzerland	1187; 12.59	867; 1.71	767; 13.59	1025; 23.54	1109; 6.81	752; 44.39	923; 2:12.87	6630	
5	Sophie Weißenberg	Germany	1096; 13.19	978; 1.80	797; 14.04	1040; 23.39	1027; 6.56	751; 44.34	807; 2:21.22	6496	PB
6	Sarolta Kriszt	Hungary	1068; 13.38	867; 1.71	745; 13.26	1021; 23.58	988; 6.44	796; 46.67	922; 2:12.93	6407	PB
7	Adrianna Sułek-Schubert	Poland	1081; 13.29	1054; 1.86	837; 14.65	996; 23.84	921; 6.23	594; 36.19	892; 2:15.05	6375	
8	María Vicente	Spain	1068; 13.38	941; 1.77	733; 13.09	1009; 23.71	981; 6.42	745; 44.02	895; 2:14.81	6372	NR
9	Sveva Gerevini	Italy	1100; 13.16	903; 1.74	720; 12.89	1002; 23.78	927; 6.25	771; 45.41	948; 2:11.11	6371	
10	Beatričė Juškevičiūtė	Lithuania	1111; 13.09	795; 1.65	774; 13.70	1007; 23.73	953; 6.33	804; 47.10	864; 2:17.05	6308	
11	Noor Vidts	Belgium	1068; 13.38	941; 1.77	811; 14.25	967; 24.14	918; 6.22	674; 40.33	907; 2:14.01	6286	
12	Jéssica Barreira	Portugal	1111; 13.09	795; 1.65	862; 15.02	949; 24.33	868; 6.06	883; 51.19	742; 2:26.18	6210	
13	Jade O'Dowda	United Kingdom	1093; 13.21	867; 1.71	773; 13.69	932; 24.51	959; 6.35	697; 41.56	870; 2:16.62	6191	
14	Vanessa Grimm	Germany	1055; 13.47	867; 1.71	857; 14.94	921; 24.63	801; 5.84	742; 43.87	876; 2:16.17	6119	
15	Sandrina Sprengel	Germany	974; 14.03	867; 1.71	814; 14.30	948; 24.34	912; 6.20	683; 40.84	859; 2:17.41	6057	
16	Lovisa Karlsson	Sweden	1120; 13.03	867; 1.71	744; 13.25	952; 24.30	874; 6.08	646; 38.89	820; 2:20.23	6023	
17	Erika Wärff	Sweden	1003; 13.83	903; 1.74	789; 13.92	901; 24.85	834; 5.95	805; 47.14	777; 2:23.46	6012	
18	Sofia Cosculluela	Spain	1062; 13.42	795; 1.65	653; 11.88	986; 23.94	972; 6.39	724; 42.94	807; 2:21.20	5999	
19	Verena Mayr	Austria	941; 14.27	867; 1.71	836; 14.63	839; 25.53	810; 5.87	708; 42.10	905; 2:14.16	5906	SB
20	Adéla Tkáčová	Czech Republic	1026; 13.67	867; 1.71	677; 12.24	1040; 23.39	850; 6.00	479; 30.11	920; 2:13.07	5859	
21	Katarina Johnson-Thompson	United Kingdom	978; 14.00	1016; 1.83	713; 12.79	937; 24.46	780; 5.77	608; 36.92	758; 2:24.92	5790	SB
	Szabina Szűcs	Hungary	1036; 13.60	903; 1.74	743; 13.23	927; 24.57	0 NM	657; 39.44	DNS	DNF	
	Jana Koščak	Croatia	936; 14.30	1016; 1.83	675; 12.21	DNS				DNF	
	Anastasia Ntragkomirova	Greece	953; 14.18	903; 1.74	860; 14.98	DNS				DNF	
