= Jéssica Barreira =

Portuguese athlete (born 1997)

Personal information
- Nationality: Portuguese
- Born: 29 January 1997 (age 29)

Sport
- Sport: Athletics
- Event: Heptathlon

Achievements and titles
- Personal bests: Heptathlon: 6311 (Lisbon, 2026) NR
Medal record
Women's athletics
Representing Portugal
Ibero-American Championships
Gold medal – first place	2026 Lima	Heptathlon

Jéssica Barreira (born 29 January 1997) is a Portuguese multi-event athlete.

== Biography ==
From Lisbon, Barreira has been a member of Sporting CP since 2009. She represented Portugal at the 2014 Summer Youth Olympics. She became Portuguese champion in the javelin throw in 2018. The following year, she placed second in the long jump and javelin competitions at the Portuguese Championships. Barreira attended college in the United States at Arizona State University and competed for ASU from 2016 through 2019.

Barreira competed in Greece in May 2024, where she scored 5732 points to finish runner-up in the heptathlon in Milos. In June, Barreira won the 2024 Portuguese national title in heptathlon at the Portuguese Athletics Championships, with a tally of 5818 points.

In March 2026, Barreira competed for Portugal at the 2026 European Throwing Cup in Nicosia, Cyprus. Later that month, she represented Portugal in the 60 metres hurdles at the 2026 World Athletics Indoor Championships in Toruń, Poland. In April, Barreira moved to third on the Portuguese all-time list for the heptathlon with a score of 6077 points while competing in Brescia, Italy, her first time exceeding 6000 points in the event. Barreira won the gold medal in the heptathlon with 6126 points at the 2026 Ibero-American Championships in Athletics in Lima, Peru, in May 2026. In August, she competed at the 2026 European Athletics Championships in Birmingham, England, placing twelfth overall in heptathlon.
