= Erika Wärff =

Swedish heptathlete (born 2000)

Personal information
- Born: 16 July 2000 (age 26)

Sport
- Sport: Athletics
- Event: Heptathlon

Achievements and titles
- Personal bests: Heptathlon: 6271 (2026); Pentathlon: 4302 (2026)

Erika Wärff (born 16 July 2000) is a Swedish multi-event athlete. She has won Swedish national titles in heptathlon and pentathlon.

== Biography ==
From Heleneholm, Wärff competed for Malmö AI before becoming a member of athletics club IFK Växjö in 2022 with head coach Agne Bergvall. However, her next few years she was interrupted in her career by multiple injuries.

In June 2025, Wärff set a new personal best in heptathlon with 6119 points in winning the Nordic Combined Events Championships in Göteborg, moving to fifth on the Swedish all-time list. In August, she won the heptathlon at the Swedish Athletics Championships with 5947 points in Karlstad, finishing ahead of Lovisa Karlsson. In February 2026, she won the pentathlon at the Swedish Indoor Athletics Championships with a personal best 4302 points.

In May 2026, she set a new personal best in the heptathlon at the Hypo-Meeting in Götzis, with 6271 points, moving to third on the Swedish all-time list. On the opening day of the competition she had set personal bests in three events, running 13.63 for the 100 metres hurdles before improving her personal best in high jump to 1.83 metres before setting another personal best when she ran the 200 metres in 24.70 seconds. In July, she placed third at the World Athletics Combined Events Tour Gold meeting in Nakło nad Notecią. In August, she competed at the 2026 European Athletics Championships in Birmingham, England, placing seventeenth overall in heptathlon.
