= Sandrina Sprengel =

German athlete (born 2004)

Personal information
- Born: 12 March 2004 (age 22)

Sport
- Sport: Athletics
- Event: Heptathlon

Achievements and titles
- Personal bests: Heptathlon: 6434 (Tokyo, 2025); Pentathlon: 4475 (Toruń, 2026)
Medal record
Women's athletics
Representing Germany
World U20 Championships
Bronze medal – third place	2022 Cali	Heptathlon
European U20 Championships
Gold medal – first place	2023 Jerusalem	Heptathlon

Sandrina Sprengel (born 12 March 2004) is a German multi-event athlete. A former European under-20 champion, she won the heptathlon at the German Athletics Championships in 2025 and placed fifth at the 2025 World Athletics Championships.

== Biography ==
She is a member of LG Steinlach-Zollern. She won a bronze medal in the heptathlon at the 2022 World Athletics U20 Championships in Cali, Colombia in August 2022, behind gold medal winner Saga Vanninen and compatriot Serina Riedel. Her performance included lifetime bests in the 100 m hurdles, 200 metres, and the high jump.

She won the gold medal in the heptathlon at the 2023 European Athletics U20 Championships in Jerusalem, Israel, ahead of compatriot Pia Meßing, scoring 5,928 points.

She won the heptathlon at the Stadtwerke Ratingen Mehrkampf-Meeting, part of the World Athletics Combined Events Tour Gold, in June 2024, having scored 6260 points in total.

She placed seventh in the pentathlon at the 2025 European Athletics Indoor Championships in Apeldoorn, Netherlands with a total of 4455 points.

She won the heptathlon at the 2025 German Athletics Championships in Dresden with a lifetime best score of 6315 points. In September 2025, she competed at the 2025 World Athletics Championships in Tokyo, Japan, placing fifth overall with a personal best tally of 6434 points.

Sprengel placed third in the pentathlon at the German Indoor Combined Events Championships in February 2026, with a total of 4292 points. The following month, she set a personal best score of 4475 points in finishing in pentathlon at the 2026 World Athletics Indoor Championships in Poland. In May 2026, she competed at the Hypo-Meeting in Götzis, placing eighth overall with 6328 points. In August, she competed at the 2026 European Athletics Championships in Birmingham, England, placing fifteenth overall in heptathlon.
