= Athletics at the 2020 Summer Olympics – Women's heptathlon =

Women's heptathlon at the Games of the XXXII Olympiad
- Olympic Athletics
- Venue: Japan National Stadium
- Dates: 4 August 2021; 5 August 2021
- Competitors: 24 from 17 nations
- Winning points: 6791

Medalists
1st place, gold medalist(s)		Nafissatou Thiam	Belgium
2nd place, silver medalist(s)		Anouk Vetter	Netherlands
3rd place, bronze medalist(s)		Emma Oosterwegel	Netherlands

The women's heptathlon event at the 2020 Summer Olympics took place on 4 and 5 August 2021 at the Japan National Stadium. 24 athletes competed.

== Background ==
This was the 10th appearance of the event, having appeared in every Summer Olympics since 1984.

== Qualification ==
A National Olympic Committee (NOC) could enter up to 3 qualified athletes in the women's heptathlon event if all athletes meet the entry standard or qualify by ranking during the qualifying period. (The limit of 3 has been in place since the 1930 Olympic Congress.) The qualifying standard is 6420 points. This standard was "set for the sole purpose of qualifying athletes with exceptional performances unable to qualify through the IAAF World Rankings pathway." The world rankings, based on the average of the best five results for the athlete over the qualifying period and weighted by the importance of the meet, will then be used to qualify athletes until the cap of 24 is reached.

The qualifying period was originally from 1 January 2019 to 29 June 2020. Due to the COVID-19 pandemic, the period was suspended from 6 April 2020 to 30 November 2020, with the end date extended to 29 June 2021. The qualifying time standards could be obtained in various meets during the given period that have the approval of the IAAF. Both outdoor and indoor meets are eligible. The most recent Area Championships may be counted in the ranking, even if not during the qualifying period.

NOCs cannot use their universality place in the heptathlon.

== Competition format ==
The heptathlon consisted of seven track and field events, with a points system that awarded higher scores for better results in each of the seven components. The athletes all competed in one competition with no elimination rounds.

== Records ==
Prior to this competition, the existing world, Olympic, and area records were as follows.

World record	Jackie Joyner-Kersee (USA)	7291	Seoul, South Korea	23–24 September 1988
Olympic record	Jackie Joyner-Kersee (USA)	7291	Seoul, South Korea	23–24 September 1988

Area	Distance (m)	Athlete	Nation
Africa (records)	6423	Margaret Simpson	Ghana
Asia (records)	6942	Ghada Shouaa	Syria
Europe (records)	7032	Carolina Klüft	Sweden
North, Central America and Caribbean (records)	7291 WR	Jackie Joyner-Kersee	United States
Oceania (records)	6695	Jane Flemming	Australia
South America (records)	6346	Evelis Aguilar	Colombia

== Schedule ==
All times are Japan Standard Time (UTC+9)

The women's heptathlon took place over two consecutive days, with 4 events on the first day and 3 events on the second day.

Date	Time	Round
Wednesday, 4 August 2021	9:00 19:30	100 metres hurdles High jump Shot put 200 metres
Thursday, 5 August 2021	9:00 19:00	Long jump Javelin throw 800 metres

== Detailed results ==
=== 100 metres hurdles ===
Rank	Heat	Athlete	Nation	Time	Points	Notes
1	3	Kendell Williams	United States	12.97	1129	
2	3	Marthe Koala	Burkina Faso	13.07	1114	
3	3	Anouk Vetter	Netherlands	13.09	1111	PB
4	3	Erica Bougard	United States	13.14	1103	
5	2	Noor Vidts	Belgium	13.17	1099	PB
6	2	Maria Huntington	Finland	13.20	1094	SB
7	3	Zheng Ninali	China	13.27 (.261)	1084	PB
8	1	Katarina Johnson-Thompson	Great Britain	13.27 (.265)	1084	SB
9	2	Carolin Schäfer	Germany	13.29	1081	SB
10	3	Odile Ahouanwanou	Benin	13.31	1078	
11	1	Emma Oosterwegel	Netherlands	13.36	1071	PB
12	2	María Vicente	Spain	13.44	1059	
13	2	Georgia Ellenwood	Canada	13.47	1055	
14	3	Annie Kunz	United States	13.49	1052	
15	1	Nafissatou Thiam	Belgium	13.54	1044	SB
16	3	Xénia Krizsán	Hungary	13.58 (.575)	1039	
17	2	Adrianna Sułek	Poland	13.58 (.579)	1039	
18	2	Ivona Dadic	Austria	13.61	1034	
19	2	Verena Mayr	Austria	13.65	1028	
20	1	Nadine Broersen	Netherlands	13.74	1015	
21	1	Vanessa Grimm	Germany	13.88	995	
22	1	Evelis Aguilar	Colombia	13.89	994	
23	1	Ekaterina Voronina	Uzbekistan	14.19	952	PB
–	1	Yorgelis Rodríguez	Cuba			DNF

=== High jump ===
Rank	Group	Athlete	Nation	1.56	1.59	1.62	1.65	1.68	1.71	1.74	1.77	1.80	1.83	1.86	1.89	1.92	1.95	Height	Points	Notes	Overall	Overall rank
1	B	Nafissatou Thiam	Belgium	–	–	–	–	–	–	–	–	o	o	o	o	o	xxx	1.92	1132	SB	2176	1
2	B	Katarina Johnson-Thompson	Great Britain	–	–	–	–	–	–	–	o	xo	xxo	o	xxx			1.86	1054	SB	2138	3
2	B	Erica Bougard	United States	–	–	–	–	–	o	o	o	xo	xo	o	xxx			1.86	1054		2157	2
4	A	Ivona Dadic	Austria	–	–	–	–	o	o	o	o	o	o	xxx				1.83	1016	=PB	2050	12
4	A	Georgia Ellenwood	Canada	–	–	–	–	o	o	o	o	xo	o	xxx				1.83	1016	PB	2071	8
4	A	Noor Vidts	Belgium	–	–	–	–	o	o	o	o	o	o	xxx				1.83	1016	SB	2115	4
4	B	Adrianna Sułek	Poland	–	–	–	–	–	xo	o	xo	xo	xo	xxx				1.83	1016		2055	11
8	A	Carolin Schäfer	Germany	–	–	–	–	o	o	o	o	o	xxx					1.80	978	SB	2059	10
8	A	Emma Oosterwegel	Netherlands	–	–	–	o	o	o	o	o	o	xxx					1.80	978	PB	2049	13
8	A	Anouk Vetter	Netherlands	–	–	–	o	o	o	o	o	xo	xxx					1.80	978	SB	2089	6
8	B	Kendell Williams	United States	–	–	–	–	–	o	o	o	xo	xxx					1.80	978		2107	5
8	B	Zheng Ninali	China	–	–	–	–	–	o	–	xo	o	xxx					1.80	978		2062	9
8	B	Nadine Broersen	Netherlands	–	–	–	–	–	–	o	o	o	xxx					1.80	978	=SB	1993	17
8	B	Annie Kunz	United States	–	–	–	–	–	o	o	o	xo	xxx					1.80	978		2030	14
8	B	Maria Huntington	Finland	–	–	–	–	–	–	o	xo	xo	xxx					1.80	978		2072	7
16	A	María Vicente	Spain	–	–	o	o	o	o	o	o	xxx						1.77	941	=PB	2000	16
16	A	Verena Mayr	Austria	–	–	–	–	o	o	xo	o	xxx						1.77	941	SB	1969	19
16	A	Vanessa Grimm	Germany	–	–	o	o	o	xo	xo	xxo	xxx						1.77	941	=PB	1936	21
16	B	Ekaterina Voronina	Uzbekistan	–	–	–	–	o	–	o	o	xxx						1.77	941		1893	22
20	B	Xénia Krizsán	Hungary	–	–	–	o	–	xo	o	xxx							1.74	903		1942	20
20	A	Odile Ahouanwanou	Benin	–	–	–	o	–	o	xxo	xxx							1.74	903		1981	18
20	A	Marthe Koala	Burkina Faso	–	–	o	o	o	o	xxo	xxx							1.74	903		2017	15
23	A	Evelis Aguilar	Colombia	–	o	o	o	xo	xxx									1.68	830		1824	23
–	B	Yorgelis Rodríguez	Cuba																	DNS		

=== Shot put ===
Rank	Group	Athlete	Nation	#1	#2	#3	Distance	Points	Notes	Overall	Overall rank
1	B	Odile Ahouanwanou	Benin	15.45	x	14.20	15.45	891		2872	6
2	B	Anouk Vetter	Netherlands	13.96	15.29	14.74	15.29	880	SB	2969	2
3	B	Annie Kunz	United States	15.04	15.15	14.83	15.15	871		2901	4
4	B	Nafissatou Thiam	Belgium	14.82	x	14.80	14.82	849		3025	1
5	B	Vanessa Grimm	Germany	14.25	x	14.52	14.52	829		2765	16
6	B	Nadine Broersen	Netherlands	10.90	14.01	14.50	14.50	827	SB	2820	11
7	A	Noor Vidts	Belgium	13.59	14.33	13.35	14.33	816	PB	2931	3
8	A	Ivona Dadic	Austria	14.10	x	x	14.10	801	SB	2851	8
9	A	Carolin Schäfer	Germany	13.99	13.70	13.59	13.99	793	SB	2852	9
10	B	Xénia Krizsán	Hungary	13.78	13.60	x	13.78	779		2721	19
11	A	Ekaterina Voronina	Uzbekistan	12.92	13.09	13.76	13.76	778	SB	2671	22
12	B	Verena Mayr	Austria	13.40	13.59	x	13.59	767		2736	18
13	A	Zheng Ninali	China	12.05	13.55	x	13.55	764		2826	10
14	B	Evelis Aguilar	Colombia	13.34	13.42	12.95	13.42	755		2579	23
15	A	Katarina Johnson-Thompson	Great Britain	11.94	13.31	12.86	13.31	748	SB	2886	5
16	B	Emma Oosterwegel	Netherlands	12.06	x	13.28	13.28	746		2795	12
17	A	Adrianna Sułek	Poland	12.80	x	x	12.80	714		2769	14
18	A	María Vicente	Spain	12.40	12.70	12.49	12.70	707		2707	21
19	A	Erica Bougard	United States	12.37	12.29	12.69	12.69	707	SB	2864	7
20	B	Marthe Koala	Burkina Faso	12.54	x	x	12.54	697		2714	20
21	A	Maria Huntington	Finland	x	x	12.49	12.49	694		2766	15
22	A	Kendell Williams	United States	12.41	12.34	x	12.41	688		2795	12
23	A	Georgia Ellenwood	Canada	x	10.90	12.39	12.39	687		2758	17
–	B	Yorgelis Rodríguez	Cuba	–	–	–	–	–	DNS		

=== 200 metres ===
Rank	Heat	Athlete	Nation	Time	Points	Notes	Overall	Overall rank
1	3	María Vicente	Spain	23.50	1029		3736	12
2	1	Noor Vidts	Belgium	23.70	1010	PB	3941	2
3	3	Anouk Vetter	Netherlands	23.81	999		3968	1
4	3	Odile Ahouanwanou	Benin	23.85	995	PB	3867	5
5	3	Kendell Williams	United States	24.00	981		3776	9
6	3	Evelis Aguilar	Colombia	24.05	976		3555	21
7	1	Erica Bougard	United States	24.08	973	SB	3837	6
8	3	Annie Kunz	United States	24.12	969		3870	4
9	3	Adrianna Sułek	Poland	24.16	965		3734	13
10	2	Emma Oosterwegel	Netherlands	24.25	957	PB	3752	11
11	1	Carolin Schäfer	Germany	24.33	949	SB	3801	7
12	1	Ivona Dadic	Austria	24.33	949	SB	3800	8
13	2	Maria Huntington	Finland	24.50	933		3699	14
14	2	Georgia Ellenwood	Canada	24.51	932		3690	15
15	1	Verena Mayr	Austria	24.55	929	SB	3665	16
16	2	Zheng Ninali	China	24.56	928		3754	10
17	1	Ekaterina Voronina	Uzbekistan	24.67	917	PB	3588	20
18	2	Nafissatou Thiam	Belgium	24.90	896		3921	3
19	2	Xénia Krizsán	Hungary	24.96	890		3611	19
20	2	Vanessa Grimm	Germany	25.03	884		3649	18
21	1	Nadine Broersen	Netherlands	25.57	835	SB	3655	17
	2	Yorgelis Rodríguez	Cuba			DNS		
	3	Marthe Koala	Burkina Faso			DNS		
	1	Katarina Johnson-Thompson	Great Britain			DQ	2886	22

=== Long jump ===
Rank	Group	Athlete	Nation	#1	#2	#3	Distance	Points	Notes	Overall	Overall rank
1	B	Nafissatou Thiam	Belgium	x	6.47	6.60	6.60	1040		4961	2
2	B	Kendell Williams	United States	x	6.50	6.57	6.57	1030		4806	5
3	B	Anouk Vetter	Netherlands	x	6.42	6.47	6.47	997		4965	1
4	B	Noor Vidts	Belgium	6.25	6.29	6.32	6.32	949		4890	3
4	B	Annie Kunz	United States	5.99	x	6.32	6.32	949		4819	4
6	B	Evelis Aguilar	Colombia	6.16	6.29	6.17	6.29	940		4495	17
6	B	Emma Oosterwegel	Netherlands	6.08	6.00	6.29	6.29	940		4692	8
8	B	María Vicente	Spain	6.18	6.06	x	6.18	905		4641	10
9	A	Verena Mayr	Austria	6.12	5.14	6.08	6.12	887		4552	15
9	A	Zheng Ninali	China	5.88	5.87	6.12	6.12	887		4641	10
11	A	Ekaterina Voronina	Uzbekistan	5.98	6.11	5.94	6.11	883		4471	19
11	A	Ivona Dadic	Austria	x	6.11	5.62	6.11	883	SB	4683	9
13	B	Maria Huntington	Finland	x	6.10	x	6.10	880		4579	13
14	A	Odile Ahouanwanou	Benin	5.47	6.07	5.34	6.07	871	=PB	4738	6
15	B	Erica Bougard	United States	5.76	6.06	5.84	6.06	868		4705	7
16	A	Vanessa Grimm	Germany	x	5.94	5.86	5.94	831		4480	18
17	A	Adrianna Sułek	Poland	5.93	x	5.55	5.93	828		4562	14
18	B	Xénia Krizsán	Hungary	x	5.72	5.88	5.88	813		4424	20
19	A	Georgia Ellenwood	Canada	x	5.86	x	5.86	807		4497	16
20	A	Carolin Schäfer	Germany	5.69	5.73	5.78	5.78	783	SB	4584	12
–	–	Marthe Koala	Burkina Faso	–	–	–	–	–	DNS		
–	A	Katarina Johnson-Thompson	Great Britain	–	–	–	–	–	DNS		
–	A	Nadine Broersen	Netherlands	–	–	–	–	–	DNS		
–	–	Yorgelis Rodríguez	Cuba	–	–	–	–	–	DNS		

=== Javelin throw ===
Rank	Group	Athlete	Nation	#1	#2	#3	Distance	Points	Notes	Overall	Overall rank
1	A	Nafissatou Thiam	Belgium	49.63	54.68	50.93	54.68	951	SB	5912	1
2	B	Emma Oosterwegel	Netherlands	50.98	51.29	54.60	54.60	949	PB	5641	4
3	B	Carolin Schäfer	Germany	52.96	54.10	48.93	54.10	940	PB	5524	7
4	B	Anouk Vetter	Netherlands	51.20	44.87	47.23	51.20	883		5848	2
5	B	Xénia Krizsán	Hungary	50.59	50.59	49.48	50.59	872		5296	15
6	B	Ekaterina Voronina	Uzbekistan	49.88	47.42	49.15	49.88	858		5329	12
7	B	Kendell Williams	United States	44.36	48.78	47.58	48.78	836	PB	5642	3
8	A	Ivona Dadic	Austria	47.41	44.66	48.40	48.40	829	SB	5512	8
9	A	Erica Bougard	United States	46.60	x	45.14	46.60	794		5499	9
10	A	Verena Mayr	Austria	39.66	44.95	44.71	44.95	763		5315	13
11	A	Evelis Aguilar	Colombia	41.82	42.58	44.85	44.85	761		5256	16
12	A	Vanessa Grimm	Germany	44.16	43.28	44.75	44.75	759		5239	19
13	B	Georgia Ellenwood	Canada	44.11	x	x	44.11	746		5243	18
14	B	Odile Ahouanwanou	Benin	43.96	42.97	x	43.96	743		5481	10
15	A	Maria Huntington	Finland	37.87	42.91	x	42.91	723		5302	14
16	A	Annie Kunz	United States	39.90	40.38	42.77	42.77	721		5540	6
17	B	Zheng Ninali	China	42.60	x	x	42.60	717		5358	11
18	A	Noor Vidts	Belgium	40.84	39.31	41.80	41.80	702	PB	5592	5
19	B	María Vicente	Spain	30.73	x	37.04	37.04	611		5252	17
20	A	Adrianna Sułek	Poland	36.84	36.58	34.20	36.84	607		5169	20
–	B	Nadine Broersen	Netherlands	–	–	–	–	–	DNS		
–	–	Marthe Koala	Burkina Faso	–	–	–	–	–	DNS		
–	A	Katarina Johnson-Thompson	Great Britain	–	–	–	–	–	DNS		
–	–	Yorgelis Rodríguez	Cuba	–	–	–	–	–	DNS		

=== 800 metres ===
Rank	Heat	Athlete	Nation	Time	Points	Notes	Overall	Overall rank
1	1	Xénia Krizsán	Hungary	2:07.65	999	SB	6295	13
2	1	Adrianna Sułek	Poland	2:07.92	995	(.917), PB	6164	16
2	1	Verena Mayr	Austria	2:07.92	995	(.920), SB	6310	11
4	2	Noor Vidts	Belgium	2:09.05	979	PB	6571	4
5	1	Ekaterina Voronina	Uzbekistan	2:09.73	969	PB	6298	12
6	1	Zheng Ninali	China	2:10.35	960	PB	6318	10
7	1	Evelis Aguilar	Colombia	2:10.45	958	SB	6214	14
8	2	Emma Oosterwegel	Netherlands	2:11.09	949	PB	6590	3
9	2	Carolin Schäfer	Germany	2:14.82	895	SB	6419	7
10	2	Ivona Dadic	Austria	2:15.10	891	SB	6403	8
11	2	Erica Bougard	United States	2:15.92	880		6379	9
12	2	Annie Kunz	United States	2:15.93	880		6420	6
13	2	Nafissatou Thiam	Belgium	2:15.98	879	SB	6791	1
14	1	Vanessa Grimm	Germany	2:16.27	875		6114	19
15	2	Kendell Williams	United States	2:16.91	866		6508	5
16	1	María Vicente	Spain	2:16.99	865	SB	6117	18
17	2	Anouk Vetter	Netherlands	2:18.72	841	SB	6689	2
18	1	Georgia Ellenwood	Canada	2:19.21	834		6077	20
19	1	Maria Huntington	Finland	2:19.28	833	PB	6135	17
20	2	Odile Ahouanwanou	Benin	2:29.05	705		6186	15

== Overall results ==
Key

The highest mark recorded in each event is highlighted in yellow.

Key:	OR	Olympic record	AR	Area record	NR	National record	PB	Personal best	SB	Seasonal best	DNS	Did not start	DNF	Did not finish

Rank	Athlete	Nation	Overall points	100 h	HJ	SP	200 m	LJ	JT	800 m
1st place, gold medalist(s)	Nafissatou Thiam	Belgium	6791 SB	1044 13.54	1132 1.92	849 14.82	896 24.90	1040 6.60	951 54.68	879 2:15.98
2nd place, silver medalist(s)	Anouk Vetter	Netherlands	6689 NR	1111 13.09	978 1.80	880 15.29	999 23.81	997 6.47	883 51.20	841 2:18.72
3rd place, bronze medalist(s)	Emma Oosterwegel	Netherlands	6590 PB	1071 13.36	978 1.80	746 13.28	957 24.25	940 6.29	949 54.60	949 2:11.09
4	Noor Vidts	Belgium	6571 PB	1099 13.17	1016 1.83	816 14.33	1010 23.70	949 6.32	702 41.80	979 2:09.05
5	Kendell Williams	United States	6508	1129 12.97	978 1.80	688 12.41	981 24.00	1030 6.57	836 48.78	866 2:16.91
6	Annie Kunz	United States	6420	1052 13.49	978 1.80	871 15.15	969 24.12	949 6.32	721 42.77	880 2:15.93
7	Carolin Schäfer	Germany	6419 SB	1081 13.29	978 1.80	793 13.99	949 24.33	783 5.78	940 54.10	895 2:14.82
8	Ivona Dadic	Austria	6403 SB	1034 13.61	1016 1.83	801 14.10	949 24.33	883 6.11	829 48.40	891 2:15.10
9	Erica Bougard	United States	6379	1103 13.14	1054 1.86	707 12.69	973 24.08	868 6.06	794 46.60	880 2:15.92
10	Zheng Ninali	China	6318	1084 13.27	978 1.80	764 13.55	928 24.56	887 6.12	717 42.60	960 2:10.35
11	Verena Mayr	Austria	6310 SB	1028 13.65	941 1.77	767 13.59	929 24.55	887 6.12	763 44.95	995 2:07.92
12	Ekaterina Voronina	Uzbekistan	6298	952 14.19	941 1.77	778 13.76	917 24.67	883 6.11	858 49.88	969 2:09.73
13	Xénia Krizsán	Hungary	6295	1039 13.58	903 1.74	779 13.78	890 24.96	813 5.88	872 50.59	999 2:07.65
14	Evelis Aguilar	Colombia	6214	994 13.89	830 1.68	755 13.42	976 24.05	940 6.29	761 44.85	958 2:10.45
15	Odile Ahouanwanou	Benin	6186	1078 13.31	903 1.74	891 15.45	995 23.85	871 6.07	743 43.96	705 2:29.05
16	Adrianna Sułek	Poland	6164	1039 13.58	1016 1.83	714 12.80	965 24.16	828 5.93	607 36.84	995 2:07.92
17	Maria Huntington	Finland	6135	1094 13.20	978 1.80	694 12.49	933 24.50	880 6.10	723 42.91	833 2:19.28
18	María Vicente	Spain	6117	1059 13.44	941 1.77	707 12.70	1029 23.50	905 6.18	611 37.04	865 2:16.99
19	Vanessa Grimm	Germany	6114	995 13.88	941 1.77	829 14.52	884 25.03	831 5.94	759 44.75	875 2:16.27
20	Georgia Ellenwood	Canada	6077	1055 13.47	1016 1.83	687 12.39	932 24.51	807 5.86	746 44.11	834 2:19.21
–	Nadine Broersen	Netherlands	DNF	1015 13.74	978 1.80	827 14.50	835 25.57	DNS	DNS	DNS
–	Katarina Johnson-Thompson	Great Britain	DNF	1084 13.27	1054 1.86	748 13.31	DQ	DNS	DNS	DNS
–	Marthe Koala	Burkina Faso	DNF	1114 13.07	903 1.74	697 12.54	DNS	DNS	DNS	DNS
–	Yorgelis Rodríguez	Cuba	DNF	DNF	DNS	DNS	DNS	DNS	DNS	DNS
