= Verena Mayr =

Austrian athlete (born 1995)

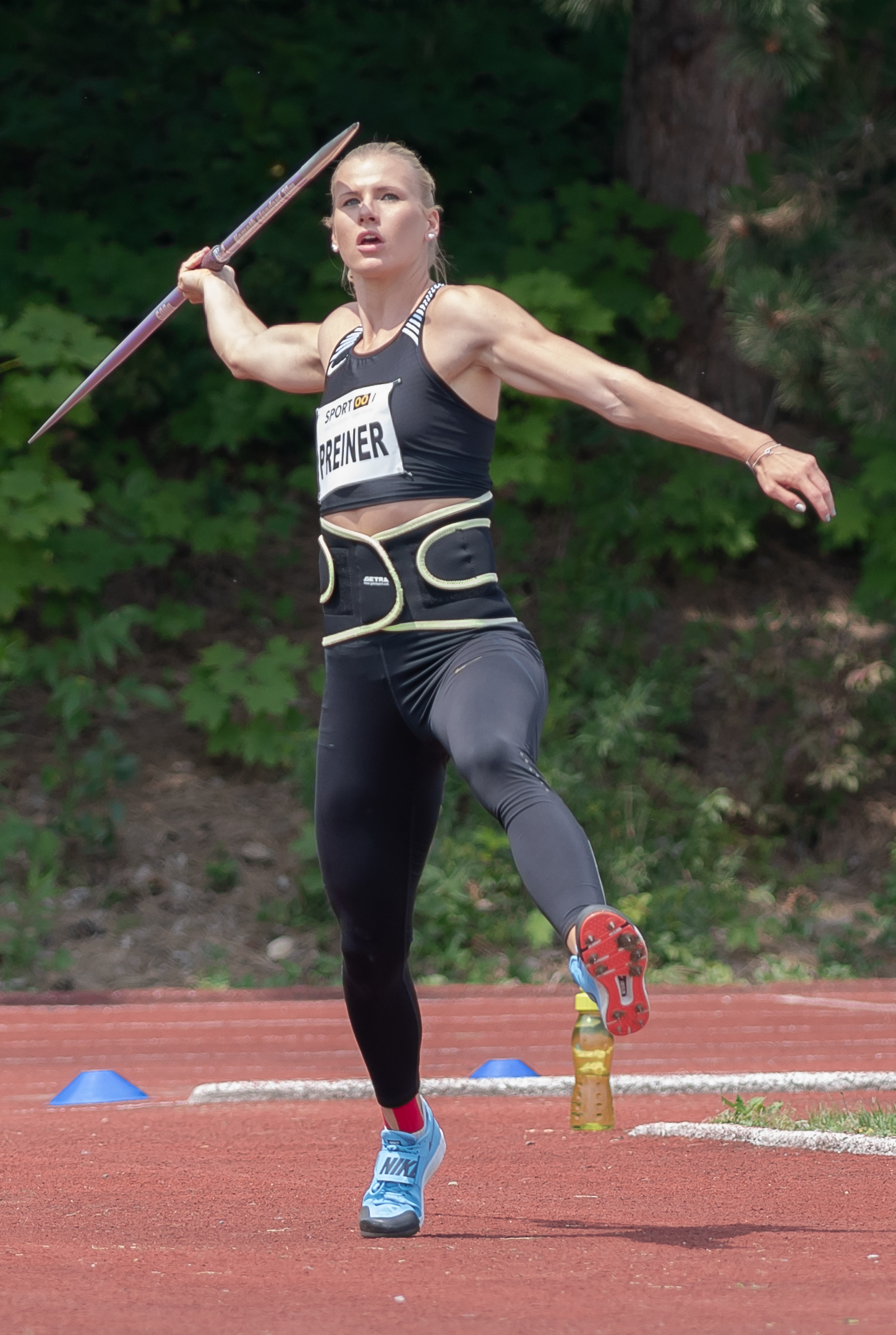
- Preiner in 2018

Personal information
- Born: Verena Preiner; 1 February 1995 (age 31) Ebensee, Austria
- Education: Johannes Kepler University Linz
- Height: 1.77 m (5 ft 10 in)
- Weight: 65 kg (143 lb)

Sport
- Country: Austria
- Sport: Athletics
- Events: Heptathlon, Pentathlon
Medal record
Women's athletics
Representing Austria
World Championships
Bronze medal – third place	2019 Doha	Heptathlon
European U23 Championships
Silver medal – second place	2017 Bydgoszcz	Heptathlon
Universiade
Gold medal – first place	2017 Taipei	Heptathlon

Verena Mayr (née Preiner; born 1 February 1995) is an Austrian athlete competing in the combined events. She won the bronze medal in the heptathlon at the 2019 World Athletics Championships. In 2017, Mayr took a silver in the heptathlon at the European Under-23 Championships and a gold at the Summer Universiade.

She represented Austria at the 2020 Tokyo Olympics, placing eleventh in the heptathlon. Mayr is the Austrian record holder in the event and won 11 national titles (mostly for the combined events).

== Statistics ==
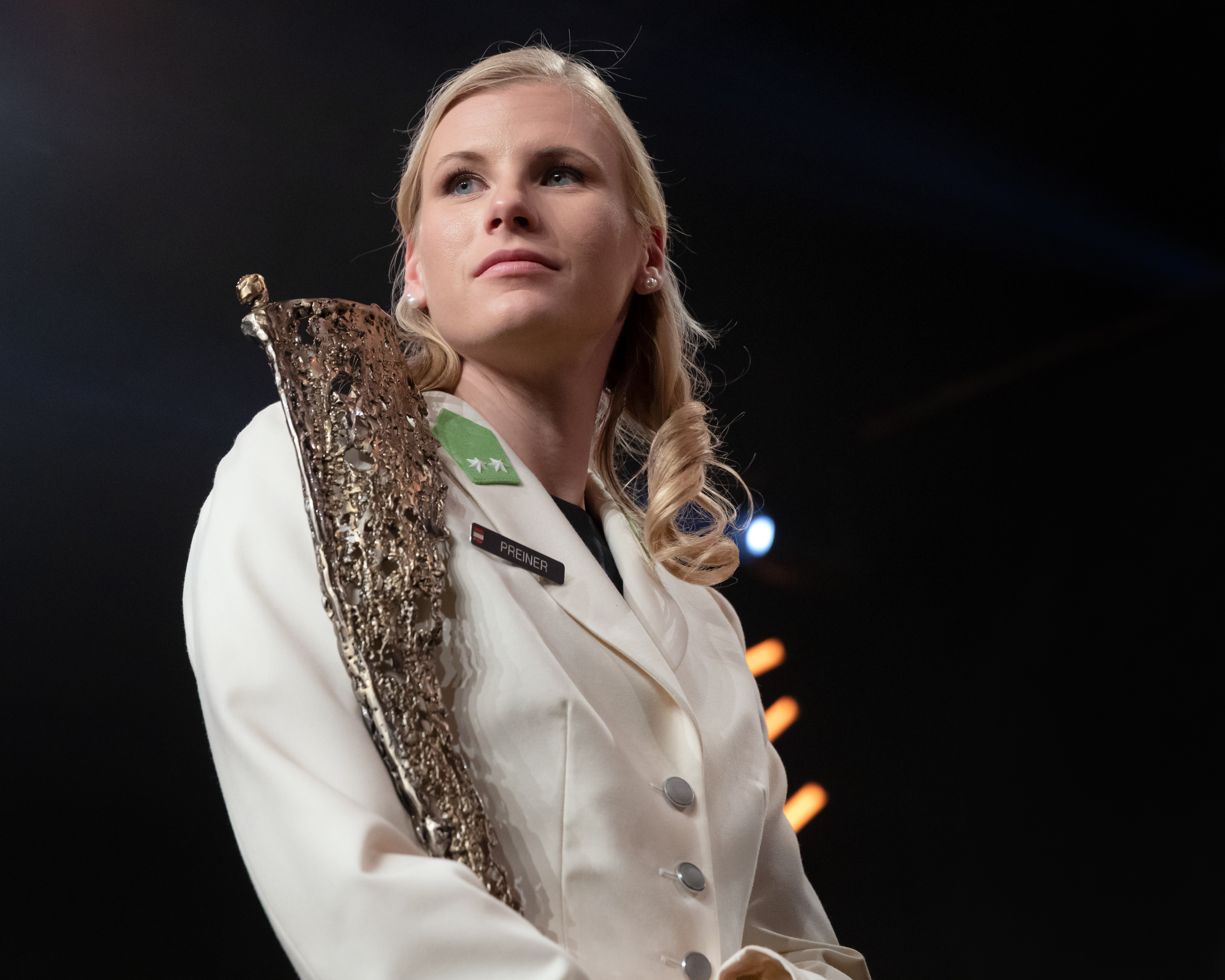
Preiner receiving Newcomer of the Year award at the 2019 Austrian Sports Personality of the Year gala.

=== International competitions ===
Representing Austria
Year	Competition	Venue	Position	Event	Result	Notes
2011	World Youth Championships	Villeneuve-d'Ascq, France	23rd	Heptathlon	4650 pts	
2014	World Junior Championships	Eugene, OR, United States	9th	Heptathlon	5530 pts	PB
2015	European U23 Championships	Tallinn, Estonia	– (f)	4 × 400 m relay	DQ	
2015	European U23 Championships	Tallinn, Estonia	4th	Heptathlon	5840 pts	PB
2016	European Championships	Amsterdam, Netherlands	7th	Heptathlon	6050 pts	PB
2017	European Indoor Championships	Belgrade, Serbia	6th	Pentathlon	4478 pts	
2017	European U23 Championships	Bydgoszcz, Poland	2nd	Heptathlon	6232 pts	NU23R
2017	World Championships	London, United Kingdom	–	Heptathlon	DNF	
2017	Universiade	Taipei, Taiwan	1st	Heptathlon	6224 pts	
2018	European Championships	Berlin, Germany	8th	Heptathlon	6337 pts	PB
2019	European Indoor Championships	Glasgow, United Kingdom	6th	Pentathlon	4637 pts	PB
2019	World Championships	Doha, Qatar	3rd	Heptathlon	6560 pts	
2021	Olympic Games	Tokyo, Japan	11th	Heptathlon	6310 pts	SB
2024	World Indoor Championships	Glasgow, United Kingdom	5th	Pentathlon	4466 pts	
2024	European Championships	Rome, Italy	–	Heptathlon	DNF	
2025	European Indoor Championships	Apeldoorn, Netherlands	–	Pentathlon	DNF	
2026	European Championships	Birmingham, United Kingdom	19th	Heptathlon	5906 pts	

=== Personal bests ===
- Heptathlon – 6591 pts (Ratingen 2019) NR
  - 100 m hurdles – 13.25 s (+0.6 m/s, Doha 2019)
  - High jump – 1.80 m (Ratingen 2019)
  - Shot put – 15.07 m (Maria Enzersdorf 2020)
  - 200 metres – 23.66 s (+0.2 m/s, St. Pölten 2016)
  - Long jump – 6.36 m (+0.4 m/s, Doha 2019)
  - Javelin throw – 49.58 m (Ratingen 2019)
  - 800 metres – 2:07.74 min (Ratingen 2019)

Indoors

- Pentathlon – 4637 pts (Glasgow 2019)
  - 60 m hurdles – 8.38 s (Glasgow 2019)
  - High jump – 1.75 m (Glasgow 2019)
  - Shot put – 14.90 m (Linz 2020)
  - Long jump – 6.21 m (Linz 2020)
  - 800 metres – 2:09.45 min (Linz 2019)
- 60 metres – 7.75 s (Linz 2018)

=== Circuit wins and titles, National titles ===
- IAAF Combined Events Challenge Overall winner: 2019
  - 2019: Meeting Arona, Mehrkampf-Meeting (NR)
- Austrian Athletics Championships
  - 400 m hurdles: 2016
  - Shot put: 2020, 2021
  - Heptathlon: 2014, 2015, 2016
- Austrian Indoor Athletics Championships
  - Long jump: 2022
  - Shot put: 2016
  - Pentathlon: 2014, 2015, 2019
