= Sofie Dokter =

Dutch track and field athlete (born 2002)

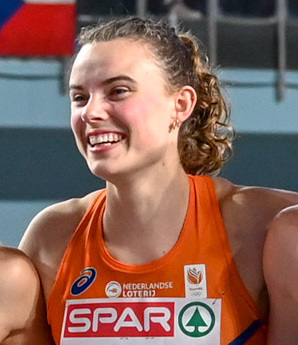
- Sofie Dokter in 2023

Personal information
- Born: 19 December 2002 (age 23) Groningen, Netherlands
- Height: 1.80 m (5 ft 11 in)

Sport
- Sport: Athletics
- Event: Combined events
Medal record
Women's athletics
Representing Netherlands
World Indoor Championships
Gold medal – first place	2026 Toruń	Pentathlon
Bronze medal – third place	2024 Glasgow	Pentathlon
European Championships
Bronze medal – third place	2026 Birmingham	Heptathlon
European Indoor Championships
Silver medal – second place	2025 Apeldoorn	Pentathlon
European U23 Championships
Silver medal – second place	2023 Espoo	Heptathlon
European U20 Championships
Silver medal – second place	2021 Tallinn	Heptathlon

Sofie Dokter (pronounced [soːˈfi ˈdɔktər]; born 19 December 2002) is a Dutch track and field athlete who competes in the combined events. She is the reigning World Indoor Champion in the pentathlon, having won the title at the 2026 World Indoor Championships. She was a bronze medalist at the 2024 World Athletics Indoor Championships and the silver medalist in the pentathlon at the 2025 European Indoor Championships. She won the bronze medal in heptathlon at the 2026 European Championships.

She was a silver medalist in the heptathlon at the 2021 European Athletics U20 Championships and the 2023 European Athletics U23 Championships. In 2024 became a three time national champion in the pentathlon. In 2022, she was also national champion in the heptathlon.

== Early life and background ==
Dokter was born in Groningen. Her father Erik and mother Hendrike were keen proponents of athletics. Sofie first took part in an athletics event aged four and first attended athletics club aged six. Her younger sister Julia Dokter is also a track and field athlete.

Dokter is a student at Wageningen University as of 2022.

== Career ==
=== 2021 ===
In her last junior year, Dokter was a silver medalist in the heptathlon at the 2021 European Athletics U20 Championships held in Tallinn.

=== 2022 ===
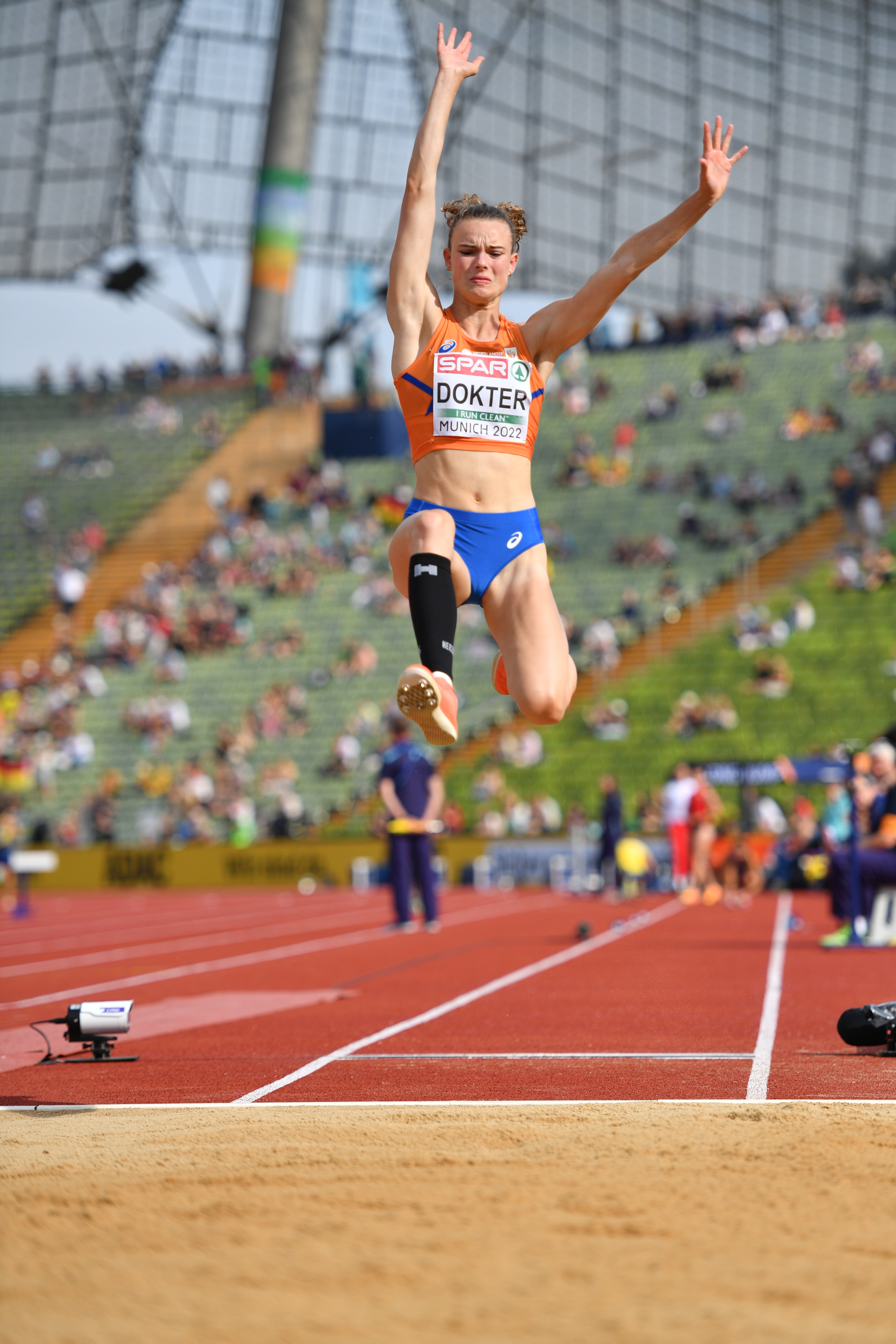
Dokter during the heptathlon long jump at the 2022 European Championships in München

In her first senior year, Dokter became 2022 Dutch national champion indoors and out. That year, she was named ‘rookie of the meet’ at the Hypo-Meeting in Götzis, where she broke the 6,000 point barrier for the first time in the heptathlon.

Dokter was selected to represent the Netherlands at the 2022 European Athletics Championships where she competed in the heptathlon. Of the three Dutch women who started, she was the only woman who finished the event, finishing thirteenth overall.

=== 2023 ===
In February 2023 Dokter scored 4603 in the pentathlon to win the Dutch national title. She became an automatic qualifier for the 2023 European Athletics Indoor Championships held in Istanbul. She finished fourth overall at the end of the pentathlon.

In May 2023 she finished seventh overall in the heptathlon at the Hypo-Meeting in Gotzis. In July 2023, she won silver at the 2023 European Athletics U23 Championships in Espoo, Finland in the Heptathlon.

She was selected for the 2023 World Athletics Championships in Budapest, and finished eleventh in the heptathlon.

=== 2024 ===
In February 2024, Dokter won the Dutch Indoor Combined Events Championships in Apeldoorn, with 4553 points. On 1 March 2024, she was a bronze medalist at the 2024 World Athletics Indoor Championships. Her tally included a huge personal best in the final event, the 800 metres of 2:11.89 min and a final tally of 4.571 points.

In June 2024, she finished in fifth place overall in the heptathlon at the 2024 European Athletics Championships in Rome, and in August she achieved sixth place overall in the Paris 2024 Summer Olympics with a new personal best of 6,452 points.

=== 2025 ===
She finished third in the high jump at the Dutch Indoor Athletics Championships with a clearance of 1.82 metres. She was selected for the 2025 European Athletics Indoor Championships in Apeldoorn, where she won the silver medal with a personal best pentathlon tally of 4826 points, only four points away from the Dutch national record of Nadine Broersen.

She finished in second place overall in the heptathlon at the Hypo-Meeting in Götzis, Austria, on 1 June 2025 with a tally of 6576 points. She placed sixth overall in September competing at the 2025 World Championships in Tokyo, Japan.

=== 2026 ===
Dokter won the gold medal in pentathlon at the 2026 World Athletics Indoor Championships in Poland in March 2026, achieving a personal best score of 4888 points to win ahead of the heptathlon gold and silver medalists from the 2025 World Championships, Anna Hall and Kate O'Connor. Dokter led from the second event onwards, having cleared 1.87 metres, and also produced the best mark in the long jump of 6.52 m, with 8.19 in the 60 m hurdles, and 13.92m in the shot put. With a seven-second advantage over Hall heading into the 800 m, Doktor ran 2:12.27 to trail Hall home less than six behind her to secure the victory.

In May, Dokter set three personal best on the opening day of the Hypo-Meeting in Götzis, running 13.27 seconds in the 100m hurdles, reaching 14.70m in the shot put, and running 23.13 in the 200m. By the end of the second day she had secured an overall personal best of 6627 points, placing third overall.

On 15 August, Dokter won her first senior medal outdoors in heptathlon, winning the bronze medal with 6,664 points at the 2026 European Athletics Championships in Birmingham, England.

== Competition results ==
All information from World Athletics profile.

=== International competitions ===
Representing the Netherlands
Year	Competition	Venue	Position	Event	Result	Notes
2021	European U20 Championships	Tallinn, Estonia	2nd	Heptathlon	5878 pts	
2022	European Championships	Munich, Germany	13th	Heptathlon	5811 pts	
2023	European Indoor Championships	Istanbul, Turkey	4th	Pentathlon	4499 pts	
2023	European U23 Championships	Espoo, Finland	2nd	Heptathlon	6256 pts	
2023	World Championships	Budapest, Hungary	11th	Heptathlon	6192 pts	
2024	World Indoor Championships	Glasgow, Great Britain	3rd	Pentathlon	4571 pts	
2024	European Championships	Rome, Italy	5th	Heptathlon	6418 pts	PB
2024	Olympic Games	Paris, France	6th	Heptathlon	6452 pts	PB
2025	European Indoor Championships	Apeldoorn, Netherlands	2nd	Pentathlon	4826 pts	PB
2025	World Championships	Tokyo, Japan	6th	Heptathlon	6432 pts	
2026	World Indoor Championships	Toruń, Poland	1st	Pentathlon	4888 pts	NR
2026	European Championships	Birmingham, United Kingdom	3rd	Heptathlon	6664 pts	

== Personal bests ==
Information from her World Athletics profile unless otherwise noted.

=== Individual events ===
Personal best results for individual events
Event	Result	Venue	Date	Notes
200 metres	23.13 s	Götzis, Austria	30 May 2026	(Wind: 0.0 m/s)
200 metres	23.05 s w	Birmingham, United Kingdom	14 August 2026	(Wind: +2.4 m/s)
800 metres	2:10.88 min	Götzis, Austria	1 June 2025	
800 metres short track	2:11.89 min i	Glasgow, United Kingdom	1 March 2024	
60 metres hurdles	8.19 s i	Toruń, Poland	22 March 2026	
100 metres hurdles	13.27 s	Götzis, Austria	30 May 2026	(Wind: +1.0 m/s)
100 metres hurdles	13.01 s w	Birmingham, United Kingdom	14 August 2026	(Wind: +3.3 m/s)
High jump	1.89 m	Espoo, Finland	13 July 2023	
Long jump	6.61 m i	Apeldoorn, Netherlands	9 March 2025	
Shot put	14.75 m	Birmingham, United Kingdom	14 August 2026	
Javelin throw	47.17 m	Rome, Italy	8 June 2024	

=== Combined events ===
Personal best results for combined events
Event	Result	Venue	Date	Notes
Heptathlon	6664 pts	Birmingham, United Kingdom	14–15 August 2026	
Heptathlon	100m H (wind) / High jump / Shot put / 200m (wind) / Long jump (wind) / Javelin / 800m; 13.01 s (+3.3 m/s) / 1.74 m / 14.75 m / 23.05 s (+2.4 m/s) / 6.51 m (+1.7 m/s) / 46.20 m / 2:12.90 min			
Pentathlon short track	4888 pts i	Toruń, Poland	22 March 2026	NR
Pentathlon short track	60m H / High jump / Shot put / Long jump / 800m; 8.26 s i / 1.84 m i / 13.86 m i / 6.61 m i / 2:14.53 min i			

=== Team events ===
Personal best results for team events
Event	Result	Venue	Date	Notes
4 × 100 metres relay	46.30 s	The Hague, Netherlands	19 May 2024	Teamed with Emy Guikema, Annabel Paul, and Lea Jurdzinski of Rotterdam Atletiek.
