= Vanessa Grimm (athlete) =

German heptathlete

- Vanessa Grimm in 2023

Personal information
- Nationality: German
- Born: 22 April 1997 (age 29)

Sport
- Sport: Track and Field
- Event: Heptathlon

Achievements and titles
- Personal best: Heptathlon: 6381 (Götzis 2026)

Vanessa Grimm (born 22 April 1997) is a German multi-event athlete. She competed in the heptathlon at the 2023 World Athletics Championships and the 2020 Olympic Games, and in the pentathlon at the 2025 World Athletics Indoor Championships.

== Biography ==
Grimm won the German national indoor pentathlon title in Leverkusen in February 2020. Grimm recorded a personal best heptathlon score of 6316 on 30 May 2021 at the Mösle-Stadium, Götzis, Austria. She also competed in the heptathlon at the delayed 2020 Summer Olympics held in Tokyo in 2021.

She recorded a third place finish at the Hypo-Meeting in Götzis in May 2022 with 6,323 points. However, she missed a lot of competitive action in 2022, including a home European Championships and the 2022 World Championships, due to a cruciate ligament tear in her knee which occurred in June of that year. She returned to action in early 2023 during the indoor season after opting not to have surgery on her knee. Selected for the 2023 World Athletics Championships in Budapest, she finished in 14th place overall.

Competing in Tallinn in February 2024, she set a new personal best for the pentathlon of 4494 points. It was her first indoor competition for three years. Competing in Götzis in May 2024, she scored 6,307 points for the heptathlon. The following month at the 2024 European Athletics Championships in Rome, she placed eleventh overall in the Women's heptathlon with 6036 points.

She was selected for the 2025 World Athletics Indoor Championships in Nanjing in March 2025, where she placed fourth overall in the pentathlon. In September 2025, she competed at the 2025 World Championships in Tokyo, Japan. She placed seventh in the season-long World Athletics Combined Events Tour for 2025.

At the Hypo-Meeting in May 2026, Grimm set a new heptathlon personal best of 6381 points, placing sixth overall. In August, she competed at the 2026 European Athletics Championships in Birmingham, England, placing fourteenth overall in heptathlon.

== Personal life ==
From Hofgeismar in Northern Hesse, Grimm moved to Frankfurt in 2015 to pursue athletics. She is a member of Königsteiner LV. She also works as a police officer in Frankfurt.
