= Abigail Pawlett =

British athlete (born 2003)

Abi Pawlett
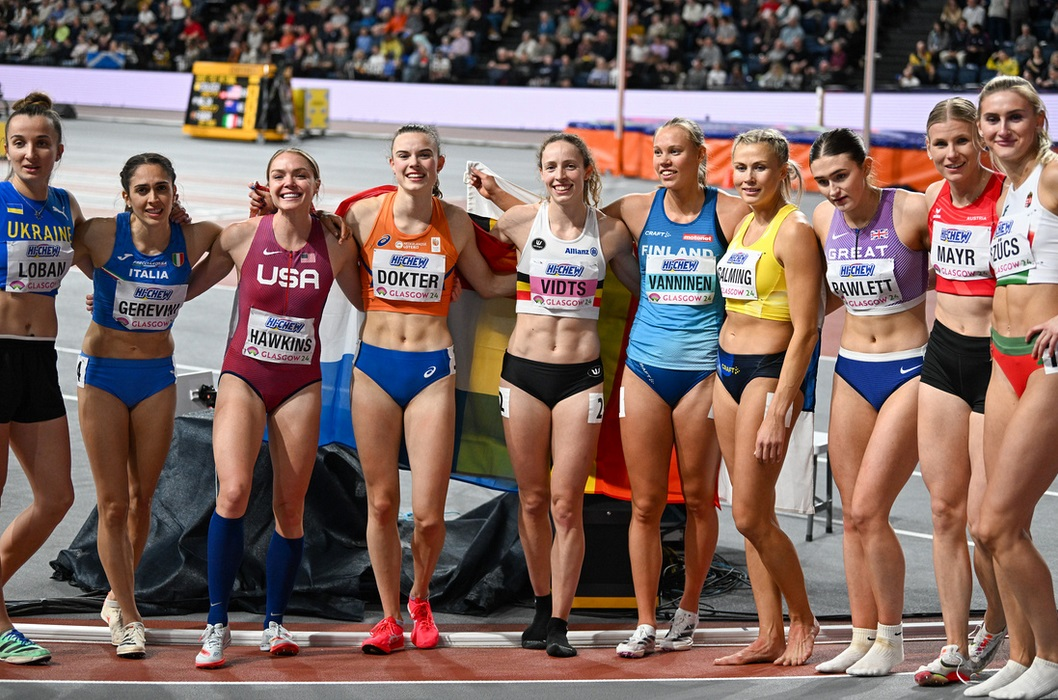
- Abigail Pawlett in 2024

Personal information
- Nationality: British (Welsh)
- Born: 14 January 2003 (age 23)

Sport
- Sport: Athletics
- Events: Heptathlon, Pentathlon, 100 metres hurdles
- Club: Trafford AC
- Coached by: Ashley Bryant

Achievements and titles
- Personal bests: Heptathlon: 6320 (Bergen, 2025); Pentathlon: 4675 (Toruń, 2026)
Medal record
Women's athletics
Representing Great Britain
European U23 Championships
Silver medal – second place	2025 Bergen	Heptathlon

Abigail Pawlett (born 14 January 2003) is a British multi-event athlete. She won the 2025 British Indoor Championships in the 60 metres hurdles, and competed in the heptathlon at the 2025 World Championships, having won a silver medal in the event at the 2025 European U23 Championships.

== Early life ==
From Chester, she attended Tarporley High School. She started athletics at eight years-old at West Cheshire Athletics Club. She broke the British Indoor Under-17 heptathlon record in 2019 and broke the north-west girls’ heptathlon record as an Under-17 athlete, which had been held previously by Katarina Johnson-Thompson.

== Career ==
Pawlett races for Trafford AC. In 2021 won the U20 heptathlon at the England Athletics Combined Events Championships in May 2021. Subsequently, she competed in Tallinn at the 2021 European Athletics U20 Championships in heptathlon.

In June 2023, she made her debut in a senior British vest, selected for the British team for the 2023 European Athletics Team Championships held in Chorzów, Silesia, Poland between 20 and 25 June 2023, in the 100 metres hurdles.

=== 2024 ===
Having won England combined events gold in every age group previously, in January 2024, she became the English national indoors pentathlon senior champion. During the competition she broke a 25 year-old English national record held by Julia Bennett in the 800 metres and a championship record tally of 4325 points. On 17 February 2024, she qualified for the final at the British national indoor championships in the 60 metres hurdles event, running 8.24 in the final in Birmingham to finish second behind Cindy Sember. On the same day she competed in the long jump and finished seventh overall. She was subsequently selected for the 2024 World Athletics Indoor Championships in Glasgow, in which she finished ninth overall.

Pawlett set a new heptathlon personal best of 6011 points at Hypo-Meeting in Götzis in May 2024. In November 2024, she was named by British Athletics on the Olympic Futures Programme for 2025.

=== 2025 ===
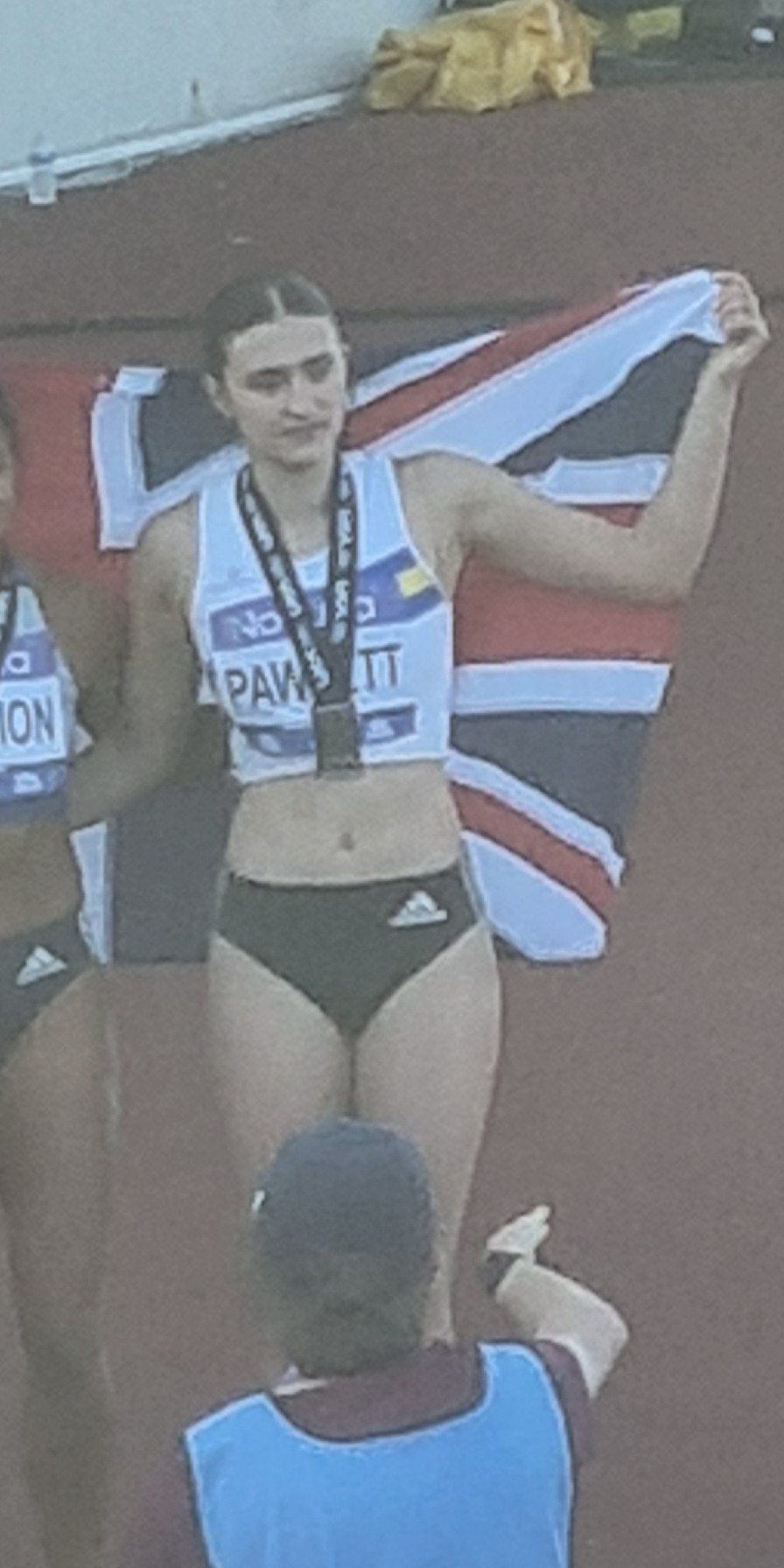
Pawlett at the 2025 UK Championships

Pawlett won the 60 metres hurdles at the 2025 British Indoor Athletics Championships in Birmingham in February 2025. Competing as a Wales international, Pawlett finished third in the long jump at the Loughborough International with a personal best 6.17m in May 2025. She also set a personal best at the event in the 100 metres hurdles, with a time of 12.97 seconds.

Pawlett lowered her 100m hurdles personal best time to 12.94 seconds at the 2025 Hypo-Meeting in Götzis on 31 May 2025. She also ran a personal best 23.06 seconds for the 200 metres on that day before finishing in eighth place overall with an overall personal best sscore of 6315 points. She was selected for the 100m hurdles at the 2025 European Athletics Team Championships in Madrid in June 2025. She won a silver medal in the heptathlon with a lifetime best of 6320 points for the British team at the 2025 European Athletics U23 Championships in Bergen, Norway. On 2 August, she finished second in the 100 metres hurdles at the 2025 UK Athletics Championships in Birmingham, in 13.12 seconds.

In September 2025, she competed in the heptathlon at the 2025 World Championships in Tokyo, Japan. Although she fell in the 100m hurdles, she completed the race, and went on to clear a personal best 1.80m in the high jump and won her 200m heat. However, suffering from delayed concussion from the fall in the hurdles she ultimately had to withdraw from the competition. In October 2025, she was named on the British Athletics Olympic Futures Programme for 2025/26.

=== 2026 ===
Pawlett set a championship record to win the 60 metres hurdles in 8.14 seconds at the Welsh Indoor Championships in Cardiff on 7 February 2026. The following week, Pawlett retained her 60 metres hurdles title at the 2026 British Indoor Athletics Championships in Birmingham on 14 February 2026, running a new personal best in each round; with 8.08 seconds in her heat, and 8.06 in her semi-final, and 8.05 in the final. Pawlett set a pentathlon personal best of 4675 points at the Copernicus Cup in Toruń, on the 2026 World Athletics Indoor Tour, on 22 February.

In July 2026, she competed in the 200 metres at the 2026 Commonwealth Games in Glasgow, Scotland. In October 2026, she was moved up to the confirmation level in the 2026-27 Olympic World Class Programme awarded by UK Athletics.

== Personal life ==
Pawlett began at Loughborough University in 2022. Her sister Emily competed as a youth international for England in netball.
