= Adéla Tkáčová =

Czech heptathlete (born 2005)

Personal information
- Born: 1 March 2005 (age 21)

Sport
- Country: Czech Republic
- Sport: Athletics
- Events: Heptathlon, pentathlon

Adéla Tkáčová (born 1 March 2005) is a Czech athlete competing in the combined events.

In 2022, she finished fourth in the heptathlon at the European U18 Championships and competed in the medley relay, where her team reached the final before being disqualified. She followed this up in 2023 by placing fourth in the heptathlon at the European U20 Championships and winning a bronze medal as part of the 4 × 100 m relay team. In 2024, she earned a bronze medal in the heptathlon at the World U20 Championships, and in 2025, she placed 11th in the heptathlon at the European U23 Championships.

Transitioning into the senior ranks, she competed in the heptathlon at the 2026 European Championships in Birmingham.
