= Emma Oosterwegel =

Dutch heptathlete (born 1998)

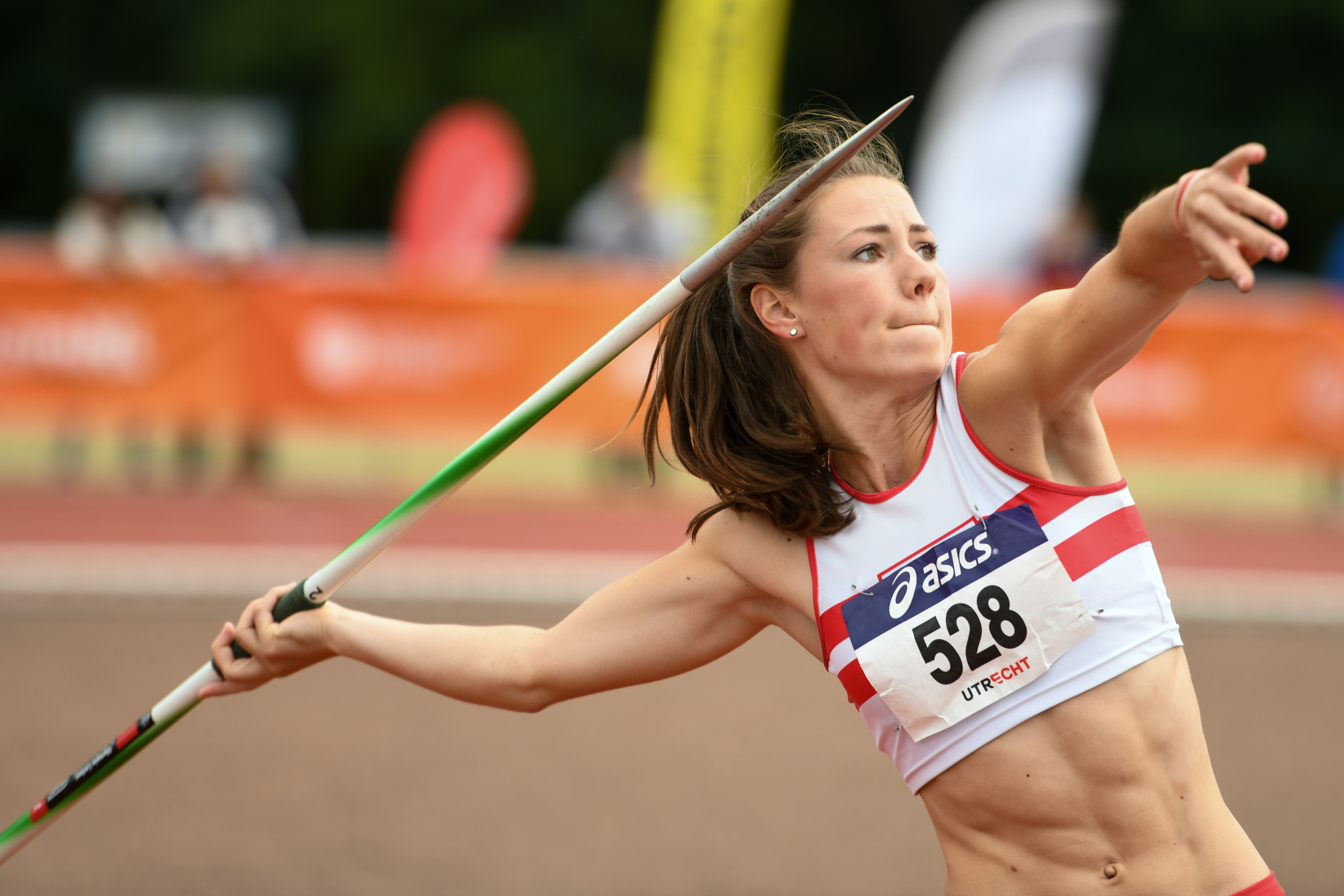
- Oosterwegel in 2018

Personal information
- Born: 29 June 1998 (age 28) Deventer, Netherlands
- Height: 1.80 m (5 ft 11 in)

Sport
- Country: Netherlands
- Sport: Athletics
- Event: Heptathlon
- Club: AV Daventria 1906
- Coached by: Ronald Vetter, Elliott Thijssen, Kees Betlem
Medal record
Women's athletics
Representing Netherlands
Olympic Games
Bronze medal – third place	2020 Tokyo	Heptathlon
European Championships
Silver medal – second place	2026 Birmingham	Heptathlon

Emma Oosterwegel (Dutch: [ˈɛmaː ˈʔoːstərˌʋeːɣəl]; born 29 June 1998) is a Dutch track and field athlete competing in the combined events. She won the bronze medal in the heptathlon at the delayed 2020 Tokyo Olympics and silver at the 2026 European Championships.

Oosterwegel has won four Dutch national titles, mostly in the pentathlon.

She was born in Deventer, and is a Soil, Water and Atmosphere student at Wageningen University.

== Statistics ==
=== International competitions ===
Representing the Netherlands
Year	Competition	Venue	Position	Event	Result
2013	European Youth Olympic Festival	Utrecht, Netherlands	13th (q)	Javelin throw (500 g)	42.80 m
2016	World U20 Championships	Bydgoszcz, Poland	18th (q)	Javelin throw	49.73 m
2016	World U20 Championships	Bydgoszcz, Poland	13th	Heptathlon	5461 pts
2017	European U20 Championships	Grosseto, Italy	8th	Javelin throw	48.08 m
2019	European U23 Championships	Gävle, Sweden	4th	Heptathlon	6072 pts
2019	World Championships	Doha, Qatar	7th	Heptathlon	6250 pts PB
2021	Olympic Games	Tokyo, Japan	3rd	Heptathlon	6590 pts PB
2022	World Championships	Eugene, OR, United States	7th	Heptathlon	6440 pts SB
2022	European Championships	Munich, Germany	–	Heptathlon	DNF
2023	World Championships	Budapest, Hungary	5th	Heptathlon	6464 pts
2024	Olympic Games	Paris, France	7th	Heptathlon	6386 pts
2025	European Indoor Championships	Apeldoorn, Netherlands	9th	Pentathlon	4400 pts
2025	World Championships	Tokyo, Japan	9th	Heptathlon	6381 pts
2026	European Championships	Birmingham, United Kingdom	2nd	Heptathlon	6713 pts

=== Personal bests ===
- Heptathlon – 6705 pts (Götzis 2026)
  - 100 m hurdles – 13.21 s (+0.6 m/s, Götzis 2026)
  - High jump – 1.80 m (Tokyo 2021)
  - Shot put – 14.54 m (Paris 2024)
  - 200 metres – 23.65 s (Götzis 2026)
  - Long jump – 6.40 m (+0.9 m/s, Leiden 2021)
  - Javelin throw – 55.47 m (Talence 2022)
  - 800 metres – 2:08.67 min (Paris 2024)
- 100 metres – 12.47 (+1.8 m/s, Grootebroek 2020)

Indoors

- Pentathlon – 4400 pts (Apeldoorn 2025)
  - 60 m hurdles – 8.27 s (Apeldoorn 2025)
  - High jump – 1.80 m (Apeldoorn 2020)
  - Shot put – 14.45 m (Apeldoorn 2021)
  - Long jump – 6.25 m (Apeldoorn 2026)
  - 800 metres – 2:14.24 min (Apeldoorn 2025)

=== National titles ===
- Dutch Athletics Championships
  - Javelin throw: 2016
- Dutch Indoor Athletics Championships
  - Pentathlon: 2018, 2019, 2020
