= Lovisa Karlsson (heptathlete) =

Swedish athlete (born 2000)

Personal information
- Born: 15 January 2000 (age 26)

Sport
- Sport: Athletics
- Events: Heptathlon, Pentathlon

Achievements and titles
- Personal bests: Heptathlon: 6218 (Nakło nad Notecią, 2026); Pentathlon 4365 (Aubiere, 2025)

Lovisa Karlsson (born 15 January 2000) is a Swedish multi-event athlete. She has won Swedish national titles in the heptathlon, pentathlon, 60 and 100 metres hurdles, and the long jump. She has competed at the European Championships and European Indoor Championships.

== Biography ==
She is a member of Högby IF on the island of Öland in Sweden. She won her first Swedish national pentathlon title in February 2022 at the Swedish Indoor Combined Events Championships. She won the Swedish national title in the heptathlon for the first time in July 2023 at the Swedish Athletics Championships.

She finished seventh overall in the 2024 World Athletics Combined Events Tour. Her performances included fourth place finishes at the events in Brescia and Talence. She qualified for the heptathlon at the 2024 European Athletics Championships in Rome. She finished in tenth place overall, achieving a personal best total of 6146 points. That tally included personal bests in both the 200 and 800 meters and moved her to fourth on the Swedish all-time list. She was nominated for the Breakthrough of the Year award by Swedish Athletics in January 2025.

Competing in Aubiere, France in January 2025, she set a pentathlon personal best with a score of 4365 points. It included personal bests in the 60m hurdles (8.12) and 800m (2:20.78). In March 2025, she was selected for the pentathlon at the 2025 European Athletics Indoor Championships in Apeldoorn, Netherlands, in which she placed eleventh overall with a tally of 4357 points.

She scored 6061 points to win the International Meeting of Arona in Spain, the second Gold leg of the World Athletics Combined Events Tour, in June 2025. In August, she placed second in the heptathlon at the Swedish Athletics Championships finishing behind Erika Wärff.

In April 2026, she won the Meeting Internazionale Multistars in Brescia, Italy with a personal best score of 6190 points. In July, she set a new personal best of 6218 points at the World Athletics Combined Events Tour Gold meeting in Nakło nad Notecią. In August, she competed at the 2026 European Athletics Championships in Birmingham, England, placing sixteenth overall in heptathlon.
