= Sofia Cosculluela =

Spanish athlete (born 2004)

Personal information
- Full name: Sofia Cosculluela Ordogh
- Nationality: Spanish
- Born: 26 January 2004 (age 22)

Sport
- Sport: Athletics
- Event: Heptathlon

Achievements and titles
- Personal bests: Heptathlon:: 6182 (Eugene, 2026)
Medal record
Women's athletics
Representing Spain
European U20 Championships
Silver medal – second place	2021 Tallinn	4 × 400 m relay

Sofia Cosculluela Ordogh (born 26 January 2004) is a Spanish multi-event athlete. She won the heptathlon competitions at the Spanish Athletics Championships in 2024 and the 2026 NCAA Outdoor Championships.

== Biography ==
Cosculluela was born in Madrid and has a background in sprinting. Competing at the 2021 European Athletics U20 Championships in Tallinn, Estonia, Cosculluela won the silver medal with the Spain women’s 4 x 400 metres relay team alongside Carmen Avilés, Berta Segura and Lucia Pinacchio. That summer, she also broke the Spanish U18 heptathlon record, although her progress was stymied the following year by injury.

In June 2024 at the age of 20, Cosculluela won the heptathlon at the senior Spanish Athletics Championships in La Nucia with 6017 points to became the third Spanish woman to break the 6,000-point barrier, following María Vicente and Claudia Conte. Her performances included 6.23 metres in the long jump, the longest jump in a women's combined event at a Spanish Championship and a personal best in the javelin of 42.98 meters.

As a freshman at the University of Washington in the United States, Cosculluela finished in sixth place overall in heptathlon with 5,856 points at the 2025 NCAA Championships. In April 2026, Cosculluela set a new personal best in the heptathlon with a tally of 6093 points while again competing in the United States. On 13 June, Cosculluela scored a personal best 6,182 points to win the women's heptathlon at the 2026 NCAA Outdoor Championships. In August, she competed at the 2026 European Athletics Championships in Birmingham, England, placing eighteenth overall in heptathlon.
