= Anastasia Ntragkomirova =

Greek athlete

Personal information
- Nationality: Greek
- Born: 22 January 2003 (age 23)

Sport
- Sport: Athletics
- Events: Heptathlon, Pentathlon, Shot put
- Coached by: George Boskariov

Achievements and titles
- Personal bests: 6.163pts , 4.176pts, 15.72m

Anastasia Ntragkomirova (Note: Greek: Αναστασία Ντραγκομίροβα, Bulgarian: Анастасия Драгомирова, romanized: Anastasiya Dragomirova) (born 22 January 2003) is a Greek multi-event athlete.

== Biography ==
Born in 2003 in Thessaloniki, Ntragkomirova was raised in Nea Kallikrateia, Halkidiki. She is of Bulgarian descent. She started in athletics at an early age, and joined the Kentavros Halkidiki club. She is coached by Giorgos Botskariov. In 2017, at the age of 14 years-old, she achieved 6.25 metres in the long jump in competition in Sparta. However, she had to have reconstructive knee surgery in 2020.

Ntragkomirova placed sixth overall in the shot put at the 2021 World Athletics U20 Championships in Nairobi, Kenya with a best distance of 14.57 metres. She returned to the heptathlon for the first time after her knee surgery at the 2023 European Athletics U23 Championships in Espoo, Finland. She placed third in the U23 shot put at the 2024 European Throwing Cup. with a best distance of 15.46 metres.

Ntragkomirova won the heptathlon at the 2024 Balkan Athletics Championships. She broke the Greek U23 national record for heptathlon three times in 2025. She retained her title the following year in Volos at the 2025 Balkan Athletics Championships with 6163 points, winning 6 out of 7 events, and moving to second on the Greek all-time list behind the mark set by Argyro Strataki in 2006. She placed fourth overall in the heptathlon at the 2025 European Athletics U23 Championships in Bergen, Norway, with 6045 points.

On 22 March 2026, she represented Greece at the 2026 World Athletics Indoor Championships in Toruń, Poland, in the pentathlon. In August, she competed at the 2026 European Athletics Championships in Birmingham, England, in heptathlon.

== Competition record ==
Representing Greece
Year	Competition	Venue	Position	Notes
2026	World Indoor Championships	Torun, Poland	11th	4.120 p
