= Saga Vanninen =

Finnish heptathlete

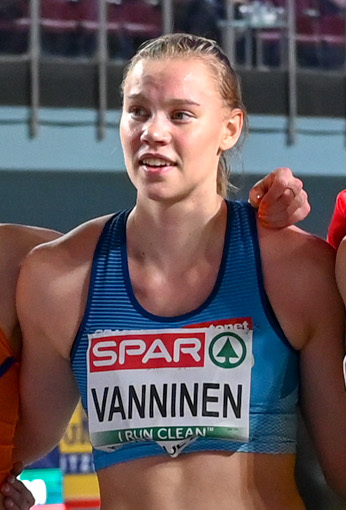
- Vanninen in 2023

Personal information
- Born: 4 May 2003 (age 23) Tampere, Finland

Sport
- Country: Finland
- Sport: Athletics
- Event(s): Heptathlon, Pentathlon
- Club: Tampereen Pyrintö
- Coached by: Erki Nool
Medal record
Women's athletics
Representing Finland
World Indoor Championships
Gold medal – first place	2025 Nanjing	Pentathlon
Silver medal – second place	2024 Glasgow	Pentathlon
European Indoor Championships
Gold medal – first place	2025 Apeldoorn	Pentathlon
World U20 Championships
Gold medal – first place	2021 Nairobi	Heptathlon
Gold medal – first place	2022 Cali	Heptathlon
European U23 Championships
Gold medal – first place	2025 Bergen	Heptathlon
Gold medal – first place	2023 Espoo	Heptathlon
European U20 Championships
Gold medal – first place	2021 Tallinn	Heptathlon

Saga Vanninen (born 4 May 2003) is a Finnish athlete competing in the combined events and the 2025 World and European indoor pentathlon champion. She also won gold medals in the heptathlon at the 2021 and 2022 World Under-20 Championships, and at the 2021 European U20 Championships.

Since 2024, Vanninen has been coached by Estonian Olympic champion Erki Nool.

== Achievements ==
=== International competitions ===
Representing Finland
Year	Competition	Venue	Position	Event	Notes	
2019	European Youth Olympic Festival	Baku, Azerbaijan	1st	Heptathlon	5913 pts	FR NU18R
2021	European U20 Championships	Tallinn, Estonia	1st	Heptathlon	6271 pts	WU20L NU20R
2021	World U20 Championships	Nairobi, Kenya	1st	Heptathlon	5997 pts	
2022	World U20 Championships	Cali, Colombia	1st	Heptathlon	6084 pts	
2022	European Championships	Munich, Germany	10th	Heptathlon	6045 pts	
2023	European Indoor Championships	Istanbul, Turkey	7th	Pentathlon	4440 pts	
2023	European U23 Championships	Espoo, Finland	15th (q)	Long jump	6.19 m	
2023	European U23 Championships	Espoo, Finland	1st	Heptathlon	6317 pts	
2023	World Championships	Budapest, Hungary	9th	Heptathlon	6289 pts	
2024	World Indoor Championships	Glasgow, United Kingdom	2nd	Pentathlon	4677 pts	NR
2024	European Championships	Rome, Italy	–	Heptathlon	DNF	
2024	Olympic Games	Paris, France	15th	Heptathlon	6163 pts	
2025	European Indoor Championships	Apeldoorn, Netherlands	1st	Pentathlon	4922 pts	EU23R WL NR
2025	World Indoor Championships	Nanjing, China	1st	Pentathlon	4821 pts	
2025	European U23 Championships	Bergen, Norway	1st	Heptathlon	6563 pts	NR
2025	World Championships	Tokyo, Japan	7th	Heptathlon	6396 pts	

=== Personal bests ===
- Heptathlon – 6563 pts (bergen 2025)
- Heptathlon U18 – 5913 pts (Baku 2019) NU18R
- Pentathlon - 4922 pts (Appledoorn 2025)

=== National titles ===
- Finnish Athletics Championships
  - Long jump: 2023
- Finnish Indoor Athletics Championships
  - 60 metres hurdles: 2022
