= Beatričė Juškevičiūtė =

Lithuanian heptathlete

Beatrice Juškevičiūtė
Personal information
- Born: 10 January 2000 (age 26) Kaunas, Lithuania
- Home town: Nashville, Tennessee
- Education: Cornell University ’22 BS Biology (Human Ecology); Vanderbilt University ’23 MA Medicine, Health, and Society
- Height: 168 cm (5 ft 6 in)

Sport
- Country: Lithuania
- Sport: Athletics
- Event(s): Heptathlon, Pentathlon
- Coached by: Justin Byron, Althea Thomas

Achievements and titles
- Personal best: Heptathlon: 6323 (2026)
Medal record
Women's athletics
Representing the Lithuania

Beatrice Juškevičiūtė (born 10 January 2000) is a Lithuanian athlete competing in the combined events. Juškevičiūtė competed at the heptathlon at the 2024 European Athletics Championships and in the pentathlon at the 2025 European Athletics Indoor Championships. In 2023, she became an NCAA silver medalist.

== Early career ==
Beatričė Juškevičiūtė won her first national title at the 2020 Lithuanian Athletics Championships, in the heptathlon in August 2020, winning with a tally of 5687 points in Palanga. She won the 100 metres hurdles at the 2021 Lithuanian Athletics Championships in a time of 14.01 seconds, at the same venue.

== NCAA career ==
Beatrice Juskeviciute competed for Vanderbilt University. Juskeviciute is a 7-time All-American, a silver medal at the 2023 NCAA Division I Outdoor Track and Field Championships in Austin, Texas, finishing with 6177 points foe the runner-up spot behind Estonian Pippi Lotta Enok. Juskeviciute won 5 Ivy League championship titles and the 2023 SEC Heptathlon Championship. The following month, Juskeviciute won the Lithuanian heptathlon title by more than 1,000 points, totalling 5,905 points which included a 13.33 seconds personal best for the 100 metres hurdles.

Representing Vanderbilt University
Year	Competition	Venue	Position	Event	Time
2023	NCAA Division I Outdoor Track and Field Championships	Austin, Texas	2nd	Heptathlon	6117 points
2023	SEC Outdoor Track and Field Championships	Baton Rouge, Louisiana	1st	Heptathlon	6079 points
2023	NCAA Division I Indoor Track and Field Championships	Albuquerque, New Mexico	6th	Pentathlon	4282 points
2023	SEC Indoor Track and Field Championships	Fayetteville, Arkansas	2nd	Pentathlon	4271 points

Representing Cornell University
Year	Competition	Venue	Position	Event	Time
2022	NCAA Division I Outdoor Track and Field Championships	Eugene, Oregon	7th	Heptathlon	5721 points
2022	Ivy League Outdoor Track and Field Championships	Yale University; New Haven, Connecticut	1st	Heptathlon	5594 points
2022	NCAA Division I Indoor Track and Field Championships	Birmingham, Alabama	11th	Pentathlon	4116 points
2022	Ivy League Indoor Track and Field Championships	Fort Washington Avenue Armory; New York, New York	1st	Pentathlon	4116 points
2021	NCAA Division I Outdoor Track and Field Championships	Eugene, Oregon	8th	Heptathlon	5694 points
2020	NCAA Division I Indoor Track and Field Championships	Birmingham, Alabama	All-American	Pentathlon	Cancelled
2020	Ivy League Indoor Track and Field Championships	Cornell University; Ithica, New York	1st	Pentathlon	4073 points
2019	NCAA Division I Outdoor Track and Field Championships	Austin, Texas	9th	Heptathlon	5438 points
2019	Ivy League Outdoor Track and Field Championships	Princeton University	1st	Heptathlon	5404 points
2019	Ivy League Indoor Track and Field Championships	Harvard University	1st	Pentathlon	3889 points

== Professional career ==
In May 2024, Juškevičiūtė broke Lithuanian national record in the 100 m hurdles race (12.87 s), becoming the first Lithuanian athlete to finish this race in less than 13 seconds. She placed thirteenth overall in the heptathlon at the 2024 European Athletics Championships in Rome, Italy. In June 2024, she won the Lithuanian national title in the 100 metres hurdles in 12.95 seconds. At the same championships two days later she also won the heptathlon national title.

She finished eighth overall in the pentathlon at the 2025 European Athletics Indoor Championships in Apeldoorn, Netherlands in March 2025.

She scored 6295 points for a lifetime best performance in the heptathlon at the 65th Mt. SAC Relays, California, in April 2025. She finished fourth at Décastar in July 2025. In April 2026, she set a new heptathlon personal best of 6323 points at Mt. Sac Relays.

Beatrice Juskeviciute has worked at Vanderbilt University Medical Center since 2024.
