= Jana Koščak =

Croatian athlete (born 2006)

Personal information
- Born: 19 May 2006 (age 20) Varaždin, Croatia

Sport
- Country: Croatia
- Sport: Athletics
- Events: Heptathlon, Pentathlon

Achievements and titles
- Personal bests: Heptathlon: 6293 NR (Gotzis 2023) Indoors; Pentathlon: 4478 NR (Tallinn 2025)
Medal record
Women's athletics
Representing Croatia
World U20 Championships
Gold medal – first place	2024 Lima	Heptathlon
European U20 Championships
Gold medal – first place	2025 Tampere	Heptathlon
European U18 Championships
Gold medal – first place	2022 Jerusalem	Heptathlon
European Youth Olympic Festival
Gold medal – first place	2022 Banská Bystrica	High jump

Jana Koščak (born 19 May 2006) is a Croatian multi-event track and field athlete. In 2022, she became the European under-18 champion in Pentathlon and Heptathlon. In 2024, she became World U20 Champion in the Heptathlon. She is the Croatian senior national record holder in the heptathlon and pentathlon.

== Biography ==
From Varaždin, Koščak secured five personal bests in winning the 2022 European Athletics U18 Championships Heptathlon event, held in Jerusalem in July 2022. Her points tally placed her fifth on the European U18 all-time list.

In January 2023 Koscak cleared 1.90m in the high jump to break the Croatian indoor U18 record held previously by Blanka Vlašić. A month later in Tallinn at the Tallinn Indoor Meeting, Koscak set a new European youth best in the pentathlon, scoring 4232. Later that month in Zagreb, Koscak scored 4585 points for the girls pentathlon which was reported as an under-18 world record score.

In May 2023 she was awarded “rookie of the meet” when she finished ninth overall competing with senior women at the Hypo-Meeting in Gotzis. It was her senior athletics debut, and she secured a new Croatian senior national record in the heptathlon of 6293 points, surpassing the tally of 5615 set by her sister Klara Koščak in May 2021.

In February 2024, she set a new national record score in the pentathlon of 4436 points, in Tallinn. She won the gold medal in the heptathlon at the 2024 World Athletics U20 Championships in Lima, Peru in August 2024.

In February 2025, she scored 4478 points in the pentathlon to break her own Croatian record at the World Athletics Combined Events Tour Silver meeting in Tallinn, Estonia. She won gold in the heptathlon at the 2025 European Athletics U20 Championships in Tampere, Finland in August 2025, equalling her national record points tally of 6293. Her efforts included a heptathlon championship best of 1.92m in the high jump, surpassing the previous best of 1.90m set by Sibylle Thiele in 1983. In September 2025, she was nominated for the European Athletics female rising star award.

In August 2026, she competed at the 2026 European Athletics Championships in Birmingham, England, in heptathlon.

== Personal life ==
From Varaždin, she is coached by her father Patrik Koščak. Her sister Klara is also a competitor in athletics.
