= 2022 European Athletics Championships – Women's heptathlon =

Women's heptathlon at the 2022 European Athletics Championships
- Venue: Olympiastadion
- Location: Munich
- Dates: 17–18 August
- Competitors: 23 from 16 nations
- Winning points: 6628

Medalists
gold medal	Nafissatou Thiam	Belgium
silver medal	Adrianna Sułek	Poland
bronze medal	Annik Kälin	Switzerland

The women's heptathlon at the 2022 European Athletics Championships is taking place at the Olympiastadion on 17 and 18 August.

== Records ==
Standing records prior to the 2022 European Athletics Championships
World record	Jackie Joyner-Kersee (USA)	7291 pts	Seoul, South Korea	24 September 1988
European record	Carolina Klüft (SWE)	7032 pts	Osaka, Japan	26 August 2007
Championship record	Jessica Ennis (GBR)	6823 pts	Barcelona, Spain	31 July 2010
World Leading	Nafissatou Thiam (BEL)	6947 pts	Eugene, United States	18 July 2022
European Leading	Nafissatou Thiam (BEL)	6947 pts	Eugene, United States	18 July 2022

== Schedule ==
Date	Time	Round
17 August 2022	10:46; 11:35; 19:49; 21:17	100 metres hurdles High jump Shot put 200 metres
18 August 2022	09:25; 11:36; 21:55	Long jump Javelin throw 800 metres

All times are local times (UTC+2)

== Results ==
=== 100 metres hurdles ===
Rank	Heat	Name	Nationality	Time	Notes	Points
1	3	Annik Kälin	Switzerland	13.23		1090
2	3	Noor Vidts	Belgium	13.26		1081
3	3	Nafissatou Thiam	Belgium	13.34		1074
4	3	Anouk Vetter	Netherlands	13.37		1069
5	2	Carolin Schäfer	Germany	13.39	SB	1066
6	3	Léonie Cambours	France	13.52		1047
7	1	Ivona Dadic	Austria	13.70	SB	1021
8	2	Jade O'Dowda	Great Britain	13.72		1018
8	2	Sophie Weißenberg	Germany	13.72		1018
10	2	Sveva Gerevini	Italy	13.73		1017
11	2	Holly Mills	Great Britain	13.74		1015
11	2	Saga Vanninen	Finland	13.74		1015
13	3	Xénia Krizsán	Hungary	13.77		1011
14	2	Sofie Dokter	Netherlands	13.81		1005
15	1	María Vicente	Spain	13.84	SB	1001
16	1	Dorota Skřivanová	Czech Republic	13.92		990
17	3	Adrianna Sułek	Poland	13.94		987
18	1	Claudia Conte	Spain	14.10		964
19	1	Paulina Ligarska	Poland	14.22		947
20	1	Yuliya Loban	Ukraine	14.36		928
21	1	Bianca Salming	Sweden	14.37		927
	2	Emma Oosterwegel	Netherlands	DNF		0
	1	Kate O'Connor	Ireland	DNS		

=== High jump ===
Rank	Group	Name	Nationality	1.62	1.65	1.68	1.71	1.74	1.77	1.80	1.83	1.86	1.89	1.92	1.95	1.98	2.01	Result	Points	Notes	Total
1	A	Nafissatou Thiam	Belgium	–	–	–	–	–	–	o	o	o	o	xo	o	o	xxr	1.98	1211	CB	2285
2	A	Adrianna Sułek	Poland	–	–	–	–	o	o	o	o	xo	o	xxx				1.89	1093		2080
3	A	Bianca Salming	Sweden	–	–	–	o	o	xo	o	xo	xxo	xxx					1.86	1054	SB	1981
4	A	Noor Vidts	Belgium	–	–	o	o	o	xo	xo	xo	xxx						1.83	1016		2097
5	A	Sophie Weißenberg	Germany	–	–	–	o	xo	o	xo	xxx							1.80	978	=SB	1996
6	A	Sofie Dokter	Netherlands	–	–	o	xxo	o	xo	xo	xxx							1.80	978		1983
7	B	Jade O'Dowda	Great Britain	o	o	o	xo	o	o	xxo	r							1.80	978	PB	1996
8	A	Claudia Conte	Spain	–	–	–	o	o	xo	xxo	xxx							1.80	978		1942
9	A	Paulina Ligarska	Poland	–	–	o	o	xxo	o	xxx								1.77	941		1888
10	A	Dorota Skřivanová	Czech Republic	–	–	o	xo	o	xo	xxx								1.77	941		1931
11	A	Léonie Cambours	France	–	–	–	o	xxo	xo	xxx								1.77	941		1988
12	B	Ivona Dadic	Austria	o	o	o	xo	o	xxo	xxx								1.77	941	SB	1962
13	B	Xénia Krizsán	Hungary	o	o	xo	xo	o	xxo	xxx								1.77	941	SB	1952
14	B	Annik Kälin	Switzerland	–	o	o	xo	o	xxx									1.74	903		1993
14	B	María Vicente	Spain	–	o	o	xo	o	xxx									1.74	903	SB	1904
16	B	Yuliya Loban	Ukraine	o	xo	o	xo	o	xxx									1.74	903	=SB	1831
17	B	Carolin Schäfer	Germany	–	o	o	o	xo	xxx									1.74	903	SB	1969
17	B	Saga Vanninen	Finland	–	o	o	o	xo	xxx									1.74	903		1918
19	B	Holly Mills	Great Britain	–	o	xo	o	xxo	xxx									1.74	903		1918
20	A	Anouk Vetter	Netherlands	–	–	o	o	xxx										1.71	867		1936
21	B	Sveva Gerevini	Italy	o	o	o	xo	xxx										1.71	867	=PB	1884
	B	Kate O'Connor	Ireland	DNS																	
	B	Emma Oosterwegel	Netherlands	DNS																	

=== Shot put ===
Rank	Group	Name	Nationality	#1	#2	#3	Result	Notes	Points	Total
1	A	Anouk Vetter	Netherlands	15.68	15.08	x	15.68		907	2843
2	A	Saga Vanninen	Finland	15.08	14.80	14.73	15.08	PB	866	2784
3	A	Nafissatou Thiam	Belgium	14.95	14.89	14.81	14.95		858	3143
4	A	Ivona Dadic	Austria	x	14.28	14.31	14.31		815	2777
5	A	Bianca Salming	Sweden	14.26	13.74	13.86	14.26		811	2792
6	A	Adrianna Sułek	Poland	13.33	14.18	13.95	14.18	PB	806	2886
7	A	Xénia Krizsán	Hungary	14.02	x	x	14.02		795	2747
8	A	Yuliya Loban	Ukraine	13.49	13.82	13.99	13.99		793	2624
9	A	Noor Vidts	Belgium	13.49	13.80	13.86	13.86		785	2882
10	A	Paulina Ligarska	Poland	13.23	13.78	13.26	13.78		779	2667
11	B	Carolin Schäfer	Germany	12.94	13.68	13.67	13.68		773	2742
12	B	Annik Kälin	Switzerland	13.56	13.18	13.12	13.56		765	2758
13	B	María Vicente	Spain	12.37	11.54	13.53	13.53	PB	763	2667
14	B	Sophie Weißenberg	Germany	13.26	x	x	13.26		745	2741
15	B	Dorota Skřivanová	Czech Republic	12.33	12.82	13.24	13.24		743	2674
16	B	Holly Mills	Great Britain	13.23	13.02	12.25	13.23		743	2661
17	B	Jade O'Dowda	Great Britain	11.91	12.32	12.98	12.98		726	2722
18	B	Sofie Dokter	Netherlands	12.78	12.60	12.60	12.78		713	2696
19	B	Sveva Gerevini	Italy	11.82	12.12	12.15	12.15	SB	671	2555
20	B	Léonie Cambours	France	11.33	11.76	11.95	11.95		658	2646
21	B	Claudia Conte	Spain	11.51	11.19	–	11.51		629	2571
	B	Kate O'Connor	Ireland	DNS						
	A	Emma Oosterwegel	Netherlands	DNS						

=== 200 metres ===
Rank	Heat	Name	Nationality	Time	Notes	Points	Total
1	3	Anouk Vetter	Netherlands	24.00		981	3824
2	3	Annik Kälin	Switzerland	24.14		967	3725
2	3	Noor Vidts	Belgium	24.14		967	3849
4	2	Carolin Schäfer	Germany	24.16	SB	965	3707
4	3	Sophie Weißenberg	Germany	24.16		965	3706
5	3	María Vicente	Spain	24.18		963	3630
6	3	Sveva Gerevini	Italy	24.30		952	3507
7	2	Dorota Skřivanová	Czech Republic	24.45		938	3612
8	3	Adrianna Sułek	Poland	24.54		929	3815
9	3	Sofie Dokter	Netherlands	24.57		927	3623
10	2	Nafissatou Thiam	Belgium	24.64		920	4063
11	1	Paulina Ligarska	Poland	24.72		913	3580
12	2	Léonie Cambours	France	24.73		912	3558
13	1	Xénia Krizsán	Hungary	24.74		911	3658
14	2	Jade O'Dowda	Great Britain	24.80		905	3627
15	2	Saga Vanninen	Finland	25.01		886	3670
16	2	Holly Mills	Great Britain	25.11		877	3538
17	1	Yuliya Loban	Ukraine	25.68		825	3449
18	1	Bianca Salming	Sweden	26.04		794	3586
	1	Ivona Dadic	Austria	DQ		0	2777
	1	Claudia Conte	Spain	DNS			
	1	Kate O'Connor	Ireland	DNS			
	2	Emma Oosterwegel	Netherlands	DNS			

=== Long jump ===
Rank	Group	Name	Nationality	#1	#2	#3	Result	Notes	Points	Total
1	B	Annik Kälin	Switzerland	x	6.73	x	6.73	PB	1082	4807
2	B	Adrianna Sułek	Poland	x	x	6.55	6.55	PB	1023	4838
3	B	Sophie Weißenberg	Germany	6.11	6.01	6.35	6.35		959	4665
4	B	Noor Vidts	Belgium	6.31	6.21	x	6.31		946	4795
5	B	Jade O'Dowda	Great Britain	6.27	x	x	6.27		934	4561
5	B	Anouk Vetter	Netherlands	x	6.27	x	6.27		934	4758
7	A	Sveva Gerevini	Italy	5.90	6.21	x	6.21	PB	915	4422
8	A	Xénia Krizsán	Hungary	6.15	x	x	6.15		896	4554
9	B	Nafissatou Thiam	Belgium	6.08	x	x	6.08		874	4937
10	A	Paulina Ligarska	Poland	6.00	x	5.87	6.00		850	4430
11	A	Yuliya Loban	Ukraine	x	6.00	5.82	6.00	PB	850	4299
12	A	Saga Vanninen	Finland	5.86	x	5.99	5.99		846	4516
13	A	Bianca Salming	Sweden	x	5.83	5.45	5.83	SB	798	4384
14	A	Sofie Dokter	Netherlands	5.82	x	x	5.82		795	4418
14	A	Carolin Schäfer	Germany	5.82	x	x	5.82		795	4502
16	B	Holly Mills	Great Britain	5.72	x	x	5.72		765	4503
	B	Léonie Cambours	France	x	x	x	NM		0	3558
	B	María Vicente	Spain	x	x	x	NM		0	3630
	A	Dorota Skřivanová	Czech Republic	x	x	x	NM		0	3612
	A	Ivona Dadic	Austria	DNS						

=== Javelin throw ===
Rank	Group	Name	Nationality	#1	#2	#3	Result	Notes	Points	Total
1	B	Xénia Krizsán	Hungary	50.38	48.28	–	50.38	SB	867	5421
2	B	Carolin Schäfer	Germany	50.18	48.57	50.03	50.18	SB	864	5366
3	B	Bianca Salming	Sweden	50.15	47.66	x	50.15	SB	863	5247
4	B	Nafissatou Thiam	Belgium	x	48.89	44.81	48.89		839	5776
5	B	Sophie Weißenberg	Germany	45.86	46.73	44.78	46.73		797	5462
6	B	Annik Kälin	Switzerland	46.45	46.72	46.55	46.72		797	5604
7	A	Yuliya Loban	Ukraine	44.77	42.73	43.38	44.77		759	5058
8	B	Saga Vanninen	Finland	42.56	43.95	43.70	43.95		743	5259
9	B	Paulina Ligarska	Poland	43.94	42.68	x	43.94		743	5173
10	A	Adrianna Sułek	Poland	40.39	41.61	42.86	42.86	PB	722	5560
11	A	Noor Vidts	Belgium	38.06	39.14	41.82	41.82	PB	702	5497
12	B	Jade O'Dowda	Great Britain	41.04	41.21	38.41	41.21		691	5252
13	A	Sveva Gerevini	Italy	40.64	37.94	x	40.64	SB	680	5102
14	A	Léonie Cambours	France	35.31	35.16	36.35	36.35		597	4155
15	A	Sofie Dokter	Netherlands	35.82	35.45	24.13	35.82		587	5005
	A	Holly Mills	Great Britain	DNS						
	A	Dorota Skřivanová	Czech Republic	DNS						
	B	Anouk Vetter	Netherlands	DNS						
	A	María Vicente	Spain	DNS						

=== 800 metres ===
Rank	Name	Nationality	Time	Notes	Points	Total
1	Adrianna Sułek	Poland	2:09.49		972	6532
2	Noor Vidts	Belgium	2:09.63		970	6467
3	Xénia Krizsán	Hungary	2:10.90	SB	951	6372
4	Bianca Salming	Sweden	2:11.85	SB	938	6185
5	Jade O'Dowda	Great Britain	2:12.03	PB	935	6187
6	Sveva Gerevini	Italy	2:12.65		926	6028
7	Paulina Ligarska	Poland	2:13.32		917	6090
8	Annik Kälin	Switzerland	2:13.73	PB	911	6515
9	Carolin Schäfer	Germany	2:17.55		857	6223
10	Nafissatou Thiam	Belgium	2:17.95		852	6628
11	Sofie Dokter	Netherlands	2:21.29		806	5811
12	Léonie Cambours	France	2:22.20		794	4949
13	Yuliya Loban	Ukraine	2:22.62		788	5846
14	Saga Vanninen	Finland	2:22.76	PB	786	6045
	Sophie Weißenberg	Germany	DNS			

== Final standings ==
Rank	Name	Country	100mh	HJ	SP	200m	LJ	JT	800m	Points	Notes
1st place, gold medalist(s)	Nafissatou Thiam	Belgium	1074; 13.34	1211; 1.98	858; 14.98	920; 24.64	874; 6.08	839; 48.89	852; 2:17.95	6628	
2nd place, silver medalist(s)	Adrianna Sułek	Poland	987; 13.94	1093; 1.89	806; 14.18	929; 24.54	1023; 6.55	722; 42.86	972; 2:09.49	6532	
3rd place, bronze medalist(s)	Annik Kälin	Switzerland	1090; 13.23	903; 1.74	765; 13.56	967; 24.14	1082; 6.73	797; 46.72	911; 2:13.73	6515	NR
4	Noor Vidts	Belgium	1081; 13.29	1016; 1.83	785; 13.86	967; 24.14	946; 6.31	702; 41.82	970; 2:09.63	6467	
5	Xénia Krizsán	Hungary	1011; 13.77	941; 1.77	795; 14.02	911; 24.74	896; 6.15	867; 50.38	951; 2:10.90	6372	SB
6	Carolin Schäfer	Germany	1066; 13.39	903; 1.74	773; 13.68	965; 24.16	795; 5.82	864; 50.18	854; 2:17.55	6223	SB
7	Jade O'Dowda	Great Britain	1018; 13.72	978; 1.80	726; 12.98	905; 24.80	934; 6.27	691; 41.21	935; 2:12.03	6187	
8	Bianca Salming	Sweden	927; 14.37	1054; 1.86	811; 14.26	794; 26.04	798; 5.83	863; 50.15	938; 2:11.85	6185	PB
9	Paulina Ligarska	Poland	947; 14.22	941; 1.77	779; 13.78	913; 24.72	850; 6.00	743; 43.94	917; 2:13.32	6090	
10	Saga Vanninen	Finland	1015; 13.74	903; 1.74	866; 15.08	886; 25.01	846; 5.99	743; 43.95	786; 2:22.76	6045	
11	Sveva Gerevini	Italy	1017; 13.73	867; 1.71	671; 12.15	952; 24.30	915; 6.21	680; 40.64	926; 2:12.65	6028	PB
12	Yuliya Loban	Ukraine	928; 14.36	903; 1.74	793; 13.99	825; 25.68	850; 6.00	759; 44.77	788; 2:22.62	5846	SB
13	Sofie Dokter	Netherlands	1005; 13.81	978; 1.80	713; 12.78	927; 24.57	795; 5.82	587; 35.82	806; 2:21.29	5811	
14	Léonie Cambours	France	1047; 13.52	941; 1.77	658; 11.95	912; 24.73	0 NM	597; 36.35	794; 2:22.20	4949	
	Sophie Weißenberg	Germany	1018; 13.72	978; 1.80	745; 13.26	965; 24.16	959; 6.35	797; 46.73	DNS	DNF	
	Holly Mills	Great Britain	1015; 13.74	903; 1.74	743; 13.23	877; 25.11	765; 5.72	DNS		DNF	
	Dorota Skřivanová	Czech Republic	990; 13.92	941; 1.77	743; 13.24	938; 24.45	0 NM	DNS		DNF	
	Anouk Vetter	Netherlands	1069; 13.37	867; 1.71	907; 15.68	981; 24.00	934; 6.27	DNS		DNF	
	María Vicente	Spain	1001; 13.84	903; 1.74	763; 13.53	963; 24.18	0 NM	DNS		DNF	
	Ivona Dadic	Austria	1021; 13.70	941; 1.77	815; 14.31	DQ	DNS			DNF	
	Claudia Conte	Spain	964; 14.10	978; 1.80	629; 11.51	DNS				DNF	
	Emma Oosterwegel	Netherlands	DNF	DNS						DNF	
	Kate O'Connor	Ireland	DNS							DNS	
