= 2023 European Athletics Indoor Championships – Women's pentathlon =

Women's pentathlon at the 2023 European Athletics Indoor Championships
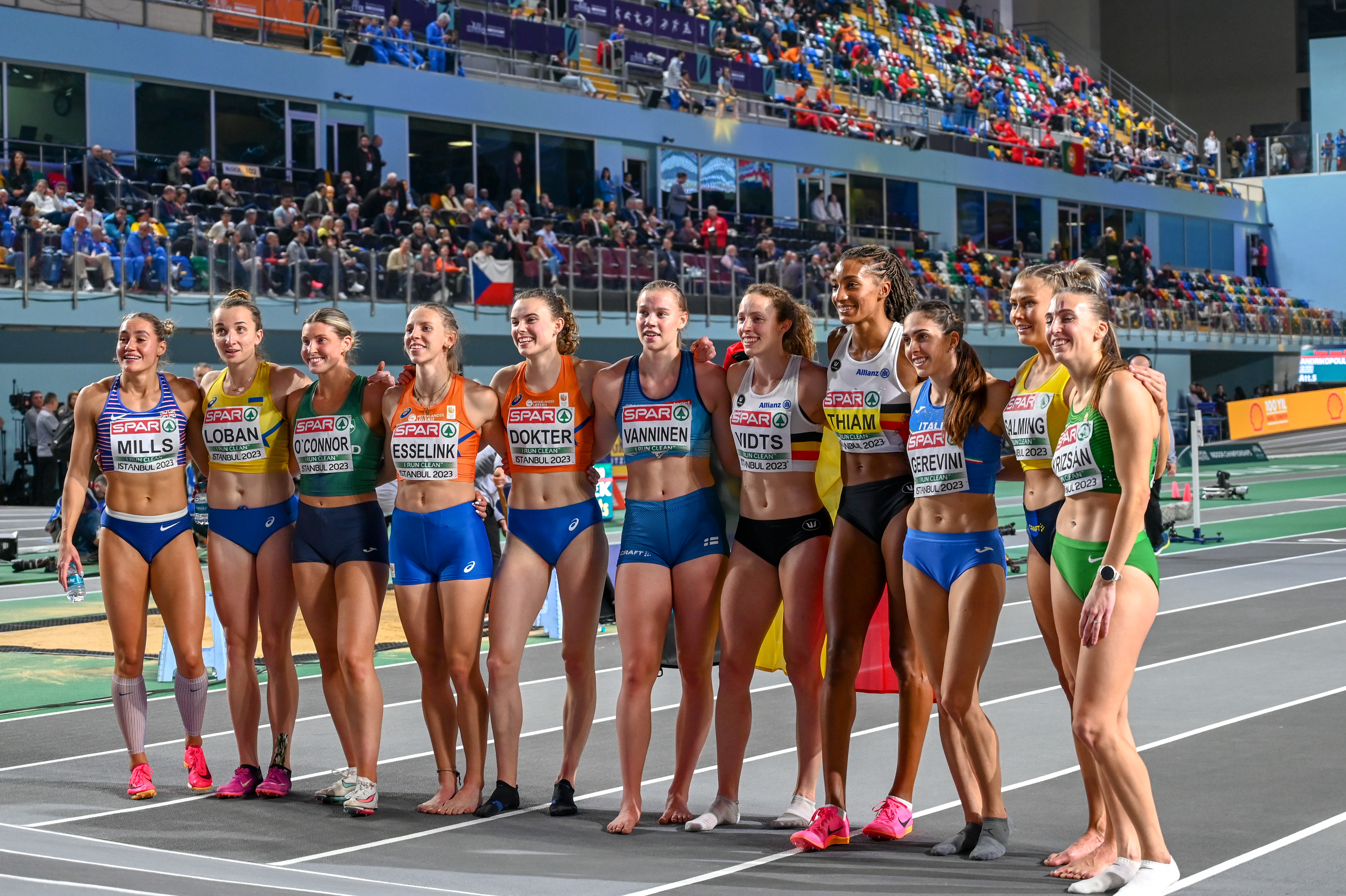
- The pentathletes after the final event.
- Venue: Ataköy Athletics Arena
- Location: Istanbul, Turkey
- Dates: 3 March 2023
- Competitors: 13 from 11 nations
- Winning mark: 5055 pts WR

Medalists
gold medal	Nafissatou Thiam	Belgium
silver medal	Adrianna Sulek	Poland
bronze medal	Noor Vidts	Belgium

The women's pentathlon event at the 2023 European Athletics Indoor Championships was held on 3 March 2023.

== Records ==
Standing records prior to the 2023 European Athletics Indoor Championships
World record	Natallia Dobrynska (UKR)	5013	Istanbul, Turkey	9 March 2012
European record	Natallia Dobrynska (UKR)	5013	Istanbul, Turkey	9 March 2012
Championship record	Katarina Johnson-Thompson (GBR)	5000	Prague, Czech Republic	6 March 2015
World Leading	Anna Hall (USA)	5004	Albuquerque, United States	16 February 2023
European Leading	Adrianna Sułek (POL)	4860	Toruń, Poland	18 February 2023

== Results ==
=== 60 metres hurdles ===
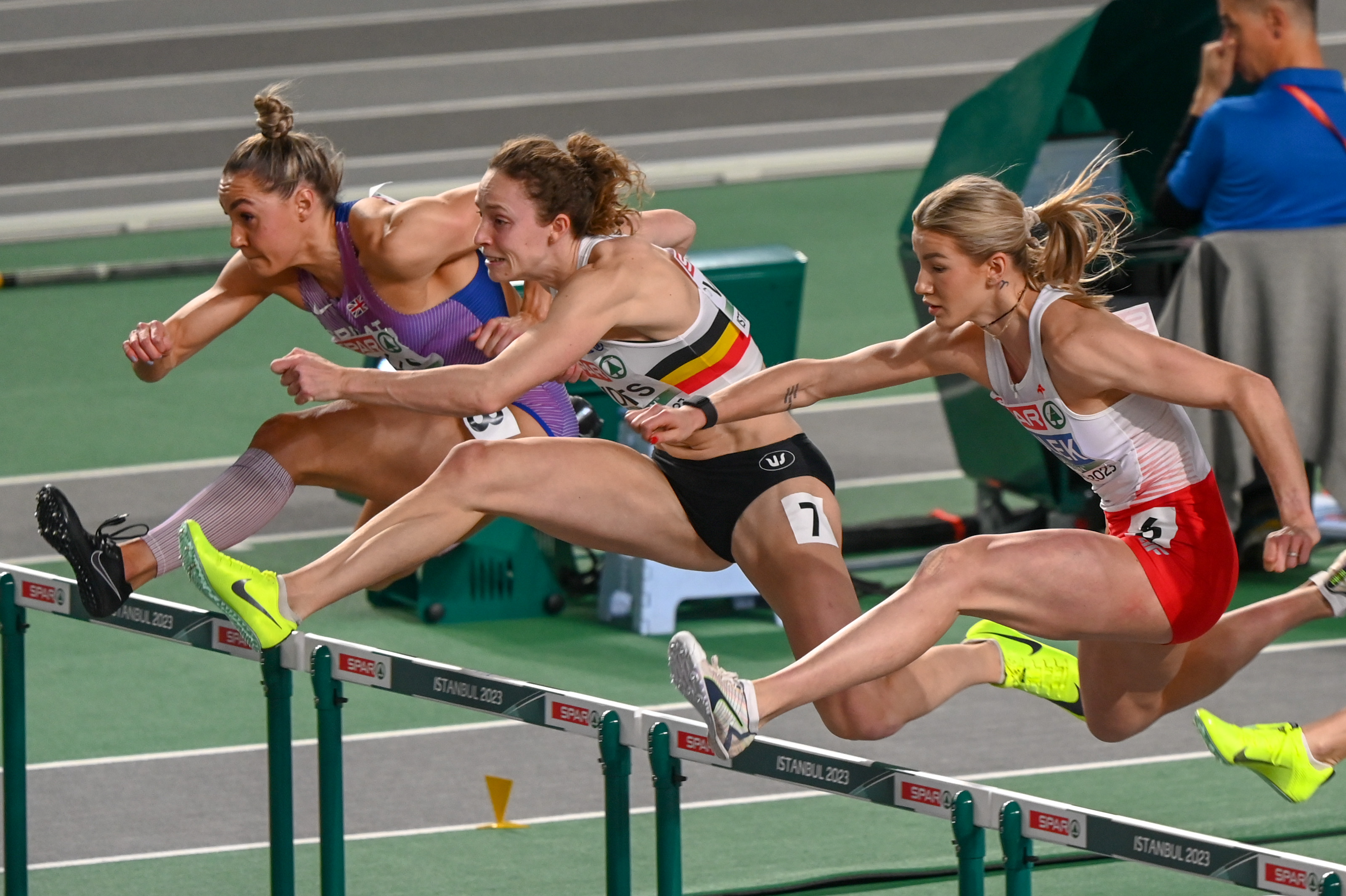
Noor Vidts won the opening event

Rank	Heat	Lane	Athlete	Nationality	Time	Notes	Points
1	2	7	Noor Vidts	Belgium	8.21	SB	1082
2	2	6	Adrianna Sułek	Poland	8.21	PB	1082
3	2	3	Nafissatou Thiam	Belgium	8.23	=PB	1077
4	2	8	Holly Mills	Great Britain	8.34	SB	1052
5	2	2	Saga Vanninen	Finland	8.35		1050
6	1	6	Sofie Dokter	Netherlands	8.37		1046
7	1	5	Marijke Esselink	Netherlands	8.39		1041
8	1	4	Sveva Gerevini	Italy	8.43		1032
9	2	5	Xénia Krizsán	Hungary	8.46		1026
10	2	4	Léonie Cambours	France	8.52		1013
11	1	2	Yuliya Loban	Ukraine	8.56		1004
12	1	7	Kate O'Connor	Ireland	8.64		987
13	1	3	Bianca Salming	Sweden	9.04		902

=== High jump ===
Rank	Athlete	Nationality	1.62	1.65	1.68	1.71	1.74	1.77	1.80	1.83	1.86	1.89	1.92	1.95	Result	Points	Note	Total
1	Nafissatou Thiam	Belgium	–	–	–	–	–	–	o	o	o	o	xxo	xxx	1.92	1132	SB	2209
2	Adrianna Sułek	Poland	–	–	–	–	o	o	o	o	o	xo	xxx		1.89	1093	=PB	2175
3	Noor Vidts	Belgium	–	–	o	o	o	o	o	xo	xxx				1.83	1016	SB	2098
4	Sofie Dokter	Netherlands	–	–	o	o	xo	o	xo	xxo	xxx				1.83	1016		2062
5	Holly Mills	Great Britain	–	–	o	xo	xo	o	xxx						1.77	941	PB	1993
6	Yuliya Loban	Ukraine	o	o	o	xo	xxo	xo	xxx						1.77	941	SB	1945
7	Bianca Salming	Sweden	–	xo	o	xo	xo	xxo	xxx						1.77	941		1843
8	Sveva Gerevini	Italy	o	o	xo	xxo	xxo	xxx							1.74	903	PB	1935
8	Kate O'Connor	Ireland	–	xo	o	xxo	xxo	xxx							1.74	903		1890
10	Xénia Krizsán	Hungary	o	xo	o	xo	xxx								1.71	867		1893
12	Léonie Cambours	France	o	–	xxo	xxo	xxx								1.71	867		1880
13	Saga Vanninen	Finland	o	o	o	xxx									1.68	830		1880

=== Shot put ===
Rank	Athlete	Nationality	#1	#2	#3	Result	Points	Note	Total
1	Nafissatou Thiam	Belgium	14.80	15.49	15.54	15.54	897	PB	3106
2	Saga Vanninen	Finland	14.97	15.20	x	15.20	874		2754
3	Yuliya Loban	Ukraine	14.51	13.93	x	14.51	828	=SB	2773
4	Kate O'Connor	Ireland	14.02	14.37	14.24	14.37	819	PB	2709
5	Noor Vidts	Belgium	13.94	14.12	14.01	14.12	802	SB	2900
6	Xénia Krizsán	Hungary	13.69	14.06	13.32	14.06	798	SB	2691
7	Adrianna Sułek	Poland	13.89	x	13.65	13.89	787	PB	2962
8	Bianca Salming	Sweden	13.74	x	13.58	13.74	777		2620
9	Marijke Esselink	Netherlands	13.38	13.65	x	13.65	771	PB	2679
10	Sofie Dokter	Netherlands	12.99	13.47	13.10	13.47	759	PB	2821
11	Holly Mills	Great Britain	12.63	12.99	x	12.99	772		2720
12	Sveva Gerevini	Italy	11.20	11.34	12.20	12.20	674		2609
–	Léonie Cambours	France	did not start						

=== Long jump ===
Rank	Athlete	Nationality	#1	#2	#3	Result	Points	Note	Total
1	Adrianna Sułek	Poland	6.52	6.37	6.62	6.62	1046	PB	4008
2	Nafissatou Thiam	Belgium	6.36	6.52	6.59	6.59	1036	SB	4142
3	Noor Vidts	Belgium	6.23	6.44	6.55	6.55	1023	SB	3923
4	Sveva Gerevini	Italy	6.08	5.87	x	6.08	874		3483
5	Saga Vanninen	Finland	5.85	6.07	5.96	6.07	871		3625
6	Xénia Krizsán	Hungary	5.85	6.05	5.98	6.05	865		3556
7	Sofie Dokter	Netherlands	x	6.04	6.00	6.04	862		3683
8	Kate O'Connor	Ireland	5.78	5.91	5.58	5.91	822		3531
9	Holly Mills	Great Britain	5.65	5.71	5.85	5.85	804		3524
10	Marijke Esselink	Netherlands	5.65	x	5.82	5.82	795	SB	3474
11	Bianca Salming	Sweden	x	5.48	3.05	5.48	694		3314
12	Yuliya Loban	Ukraine	3.98	4.71	5.38	5.38	665		3438

=== 800 metres ===
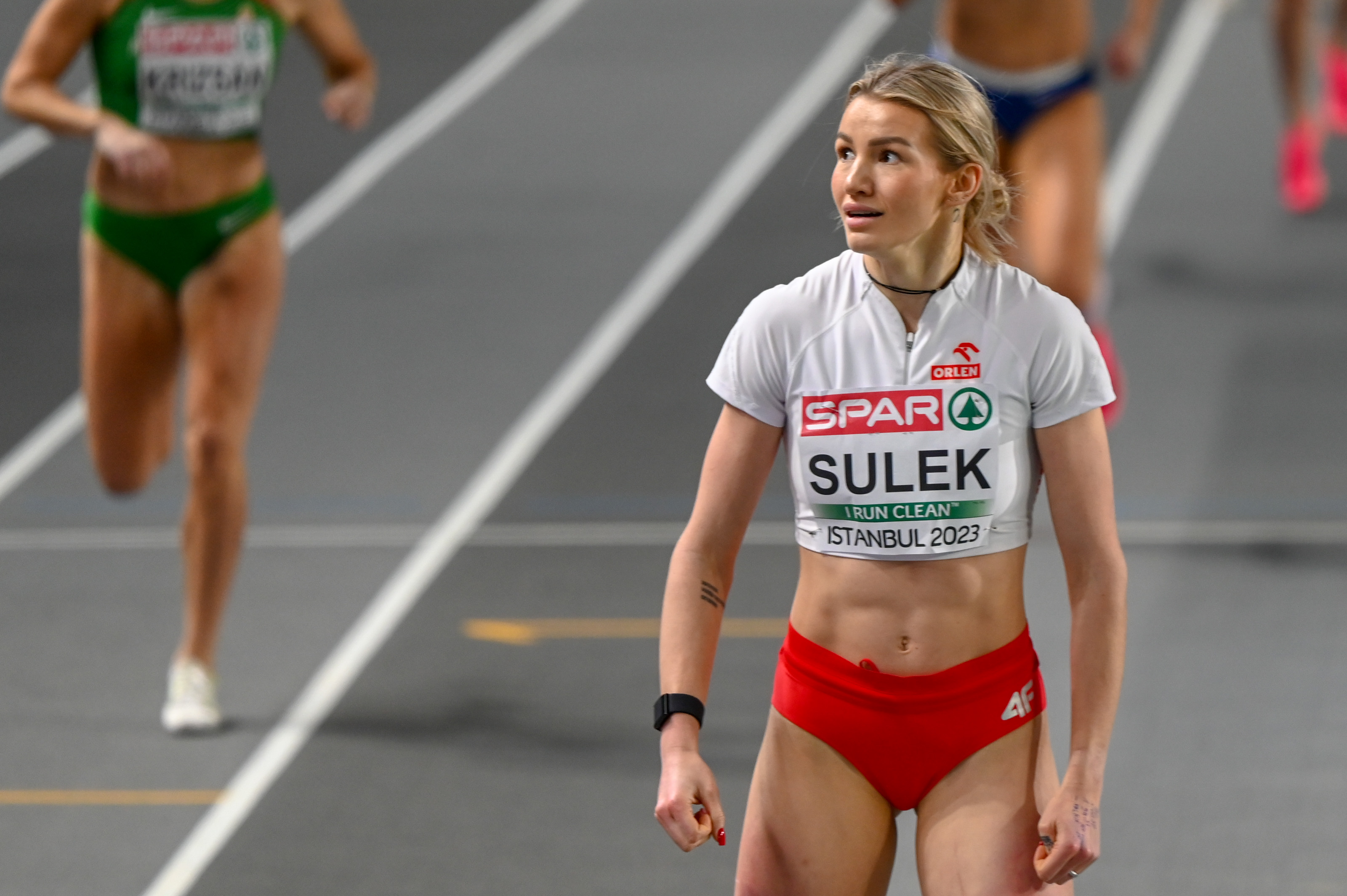
Adrianna Sułek won the 800 metres setting a new pentathlon world record for a short while.

Rank	Lane	Athlete	Nationality	Time	Notes	Points	Total
1	2	Adrianna Sułek	Poland	2:07.17	CB	1006	5014
2	6	Xénia Krizsán	Hungary	2:11.87	SB	937	4493
3	8	Holly Mills	Great Britain	2:12.58	SB	927	4451
4	1	Nafissatou Thiam	Belgium	2:13.60	PB	913	5055
5	3	Noor Vidts	Belgium	2:14.52	SB	900	4823
6	9	Sveva Gerevini	Italy	2:15.88		800	4363
7	12	Bianca Salming	Sweden	2:16.12		877	4191
8	10	Marijke Esselink	Netherlands	2:19.87	PB	825	4299
9	7	Kate O'Connor	Ireland	2:20.08		822	4353
10	4	Sofie Dokter	Netherlands	2:20.53		816	4499
11	5	Saga Vanninen	Finland	2:20.64	PB	815	4440
12	11	Yuliya Loban	Ukraine	2:33.25		653	4091

=== Final standings ===
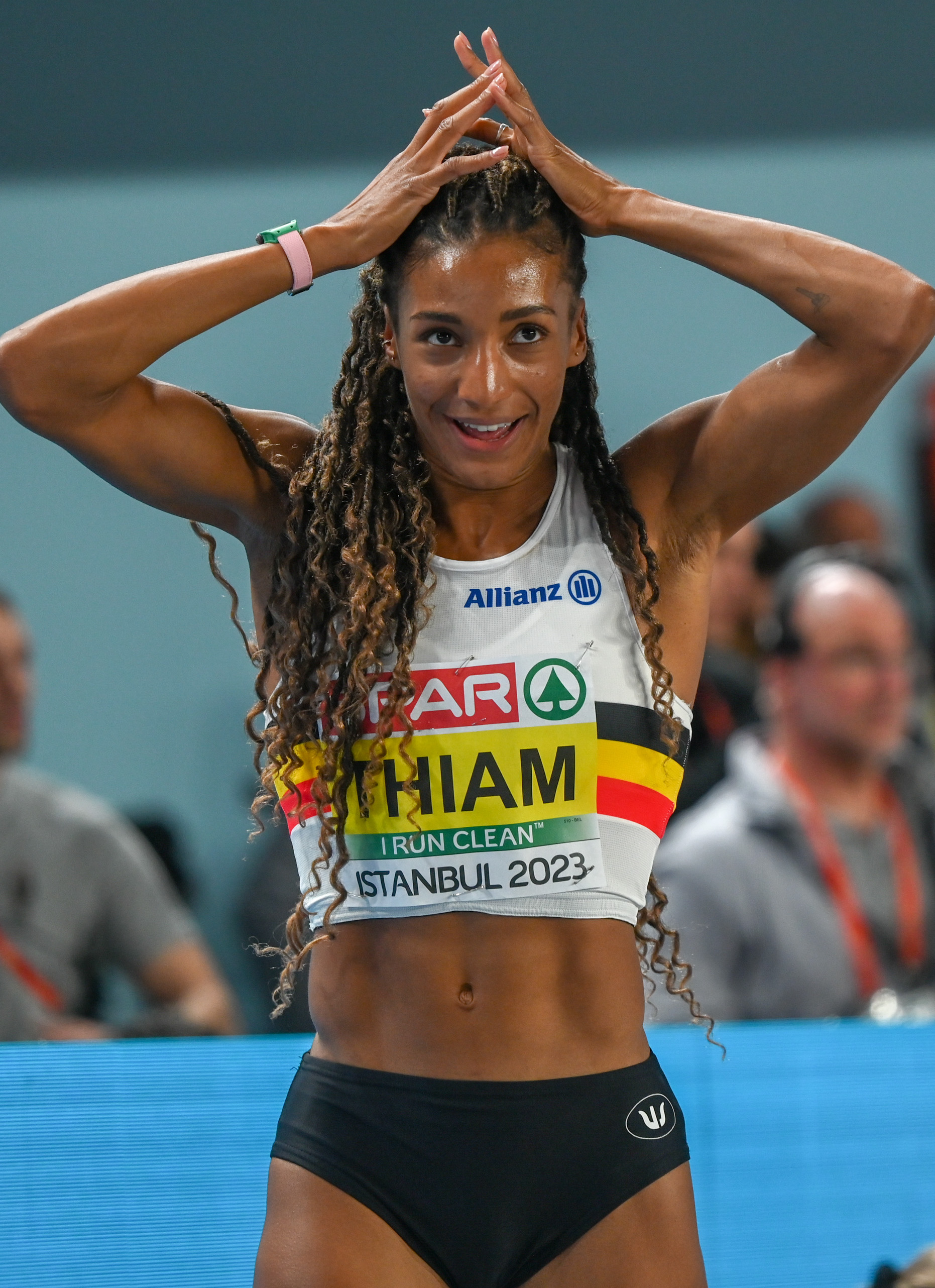
Nafissatou Thiam won gold setting the new world record

The highest mark recorded in each event is highlighted in yellow

Rank	Athlete	Nationality	60mh	HJ	SP	LJ	800m	Total	Notes
1st place, gold medalist(s)	Nafissatou Thiam	Belgium	1077; 8.23	1132; 1.92	897; 15.54	1036; 6.59	913; 2:13.60	5055	WR
2nd place, silver medalist(s)	Adrianna Sułek	Poland	1082; 8.21	1093; 1.89	787; 13.89	1046; 6.62	1006; 2:07.17	5014	NR
3rd place, bronze medalist(s)	Noor Vidts	Belgium	1082; 8.21	1016; 1.83	802; 14.12	1023; 6.55	900; 2:14.52	4823	SB
4	Sofie Dokter	Netherlands	1046; 8.37	1016; 1.83	759; 13.47	862; 6.04	816; 2:20.53	4499	SB
5	Xénia Krizsán	Hungary	1026; 8.46	867; 1.71	798; 14.06	865; 6.05	937; 2:11.87	4493	
6	Holly Mills	Great Britain	1052; 8.34	941; 1.77	727; 12.99	804; 5.85	927; 2:12.58	4451	SB
7	Saga Vanninen	Finland	1050; 8.35	830; 1.68	874; 15.20	871; 6.07	815; 2:20.64	4440	
8	Sveva Gerevini	Italy	1032; 8.43	903; 1.74	674; 12.20	874; 6.08	880; 2:15.88	4363	
9	Kate O'Connor	Ireland	987; 8.64	903; 1.74	819; 14.37	822; 5.91	822; 2:20.08	4353	
10	Marijke Esselink	Netherlands	1041; 8.39	867; 1.71	771; 13.65	795; 5.82	825; 2:19.87	4299	PB
11	Bianca Salming	Sweden	902; 9.04	941; 1.77	777; 13.74	694; 5.48	877; 2:16.12	4191	
12	Yuliya Loban	Ukraine	1004; 8.56	941; 1.77	828; 14.51	665; 5.38	653; 2:33.25	4091	
	Léonie Cambours	France	1013; 8.52	867; 1.71	DNS	DNS	DNS	DNF	
