= Wiesław Czapiewski Memorial =

Annual athletics competition in Poland

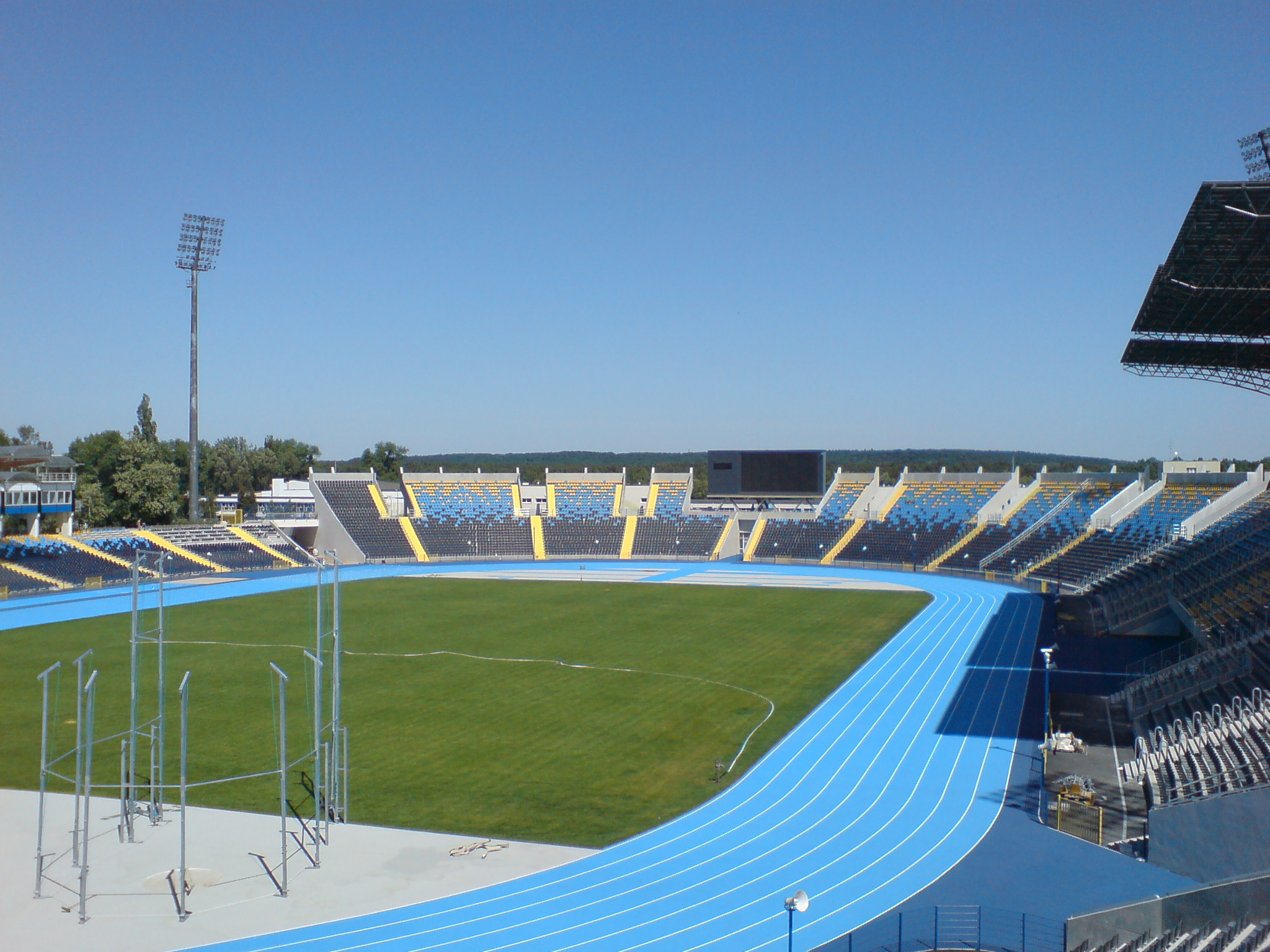
- Stadion Miejski im. Zdzisława Krzyszkowiaka, where the event was held in 2022 and 2023
- Location: Stadion Miejski; Nakło nad Notecią, Poland
- Event type: Combined events
- World Athletics Cat.: A (World Athletics Combined Events Tour Gold)
- Distance: Decathlon; Heptathlon
- Established: 2022

The Wiesław Czapiewski Memorial is an annual combined events competition currently held in Nakło nad Notecią, Poland and formerly held in Bydgoszcz. As of 2024, it is a World Athletics Combined Events Tour Gold level meeting – the highest-level circuit of international decathlon and heptathlon competitions.

== History ==
The meeting was founded in 2022, named after Polish combined events coach and competitor Wiesław Czapiewski who died in 2019. The inaugural women's winner, Adrianna Sułek, was coached by Czapiewski.

For its first two years, the meeting was held in Stadion Miejski im. Zdzisława Krzyszkowiaka in Bydgoszcz, Poland. Starting in 2024, the competition moved to Stadion Miejski, Nakło nad Notecią.

== Winners ==
Decathlon series are listed in event order: 100 m, long jump, shot put, high jump, 400 m, 110 m hurdles, discus throw, pole vault, javelin throw and 1500 m. Heptathlon series are listed in event order: 100 m hurdles, high jump, shot put, 200 m, long jump, javelin throw and 800 m.

Wiesław Czapiewski Memorial winners
Ed.	Date	Cat.	Winner	Score	Series	R
1st	14–15 May 2022	Men	Ondřej Kopecký (CZE)	8041 pts	11.06 (−0.5 m/s); 7.47 m (+1.7 m/s); 13.46 m; 1.89 m; 48.54 14.35 (+2.4 m/s); 44.06 m; 5.10 m; 57.86 m; 4:43.42	
1st	14–15 May 2022	Women	Adrianna Sułek (POL)	6290 pts	13.70 (−0.3 m/s); 1.87 m; 13.20 m; 24.34 (+0.2 m/s) 6.14 m (+0.3 m/s); 40.37 m; 2:11.25	
2nd	22–23 July 2023	Men	Kai Kazmirek (GER)	8038 pts	11.08 (+0.5 m/s); 7.02 m (+1.8 m/s); 14.42 m; 1.97 m; 48.69 14.58 (−0.8 m/s); 42.92 m; 5.00 m; 60.92 m; 4:39.34	
2nd	22–23 July 2023	Women	Sarah Lagger (AUT)	6089 pts	14.28 (−1.2 m/s); 1.74 m; 14.21 m; 25.63 (+0.2 m/s) 6.09 m (+0.7 m/s); 47.44 m; 2:13.01	
3rd	31 August–1 September 2024	Men	Felix Wolter (GER)	8068 pts	10.63 (+2.5 m/s); 7.64 m (+2.8 m/s); 13.49 m; 1.94 m; 48.39 14.52 (−1.1 m/s); 44.06 m; 4.70 m; 56.43 m; 4:43.61	
3rd	31 August–1 September 2024	Women	Adrianna Sułek-Schubert (POL)	6007 pts	13.44 (+1.4 m/s); 1.77 m; 13.75 m; 24.28 (+1.8 m/s) 5.79 m (−0.5 m/s); 37.81 m; 2:16.95	
4th	26–27 July 2025	Men	Ondřej Kopecký (CZE)	8254 pts	11.14 (+0.4 m/s); 7.36 m (+1.4 m/s); 14.35 m; 1.91 m; 49.34 14.14 (+0.2 m/s); 49.10 m; 5.10 m; 58.66 m; 4:30.95	
4th	26–27 July 2025	Women	Adrianna Sułek-Schubert (POL)	6287 pts	13.38 (+0.2 m/s); 1.77 m; 13.98 m; 24.00 (+0.8 m/s) 6.22 m (+0.4 m/s); 38.50 m; 2:11.22	
5th	11–12 July 2026	Men	Yariel Soto (PUR)	8124 pts	10.87 (+1.8 m/s); 7.80 m (+1.6 m/s); 13.45 m; 1.91 m; 48.69 14.90 (+2.4 m/s); 45.08 m; 4.80 m; 55.04 m; 4:23.61	
5th	11–12 July 2026	Women	Adrianna Sułek-Schubert (POL)	6449 pts ^{w}	13.09 (+1.4 m/s); 1.80 m; 13.69 m; 23.84 (+1.4 m/s) 6.21 m (+4.4 m/s); 43.49 m; 2:11.58	

Meeting record

^{w} = wind-assisted score

== Records ==
Event	Athlete	Record	Date	Ref.
Men's decathlon	Ondřej Kopecký (CZE)	8254 points	27 July 2025	
100 m (wind-legal)	Finley Gaio (SUI)	10.68 (+0.5 m/s)	22 July 2023	
100 m (wind-assisted)	Felix Wolter (GER)	10.63 (+2.5 m/s)	31 August 2024	
Long jump	Yariel Soto (PUR)	7.80 m (+1.6 m/s)	11 July 2026	
Shot put	Edgaras Benkunskas (LTU)	15.66 m	11 July 2026	
High jump	Tejaswin Shankar (IND)	2.18 m	26 July 2025	
400 m	Max Attwell (AUS)	47.50	26 July 2025	
110 m hurdles	Finley Gaio (SUI)	13.84 (±0.0 m/s)	23 July 2023	
Discus throw	Edgaras Benkunskas (LTU)	49.89 m	1 September 2024	
Pole vault	Ondřej Kopecký (CZE)	5.10 m	15 May 2022	
Javelin throw	Adam Sebastian Helcelet (CZE)	66.19 m	23 July 2023	
1500 m	Max Attwell (AUS)	4:17.85	27 July 2025	
Women's heptathlon (wind-assisted)	Adrianna Sułek-Schubert (POL)	6449 points ^{w} (Note: Sułek-Schubert also recorded a wind-legal long jump of 6.16m (+1.2). Substituting that attempt for her official scoring mark would produce a hypothetical total of 6433 points, but this is not recognised as an official heptathlon result.)	12 July 2026	
Women's heptathlon (wind-legal)	Adrianna Sułek-Schubert (POL)	6290 points	15 May 2022	
100 m hurdles	Lovisa Karlsson (SWE)	13.03 (+1.4 m/s)	11 July 2026	
High jump	Adrianna Sułek-Schubert (POL)	1.87 m	14 May 2022	
Shot put	Vanessa Grimm (GER)	14.91 m	26 July 2025	
200 m	Adéla Tkáčová (CZE)	23.27 (+1.4 m/s)	11 July 2026	
Long jump	Lovisa Karlsson (SWE)	6.45 m (+1.4 m/s)	12 July 2026	
Javelin throw	Bianca Salming (SWE)	49.90 m	27 July 2025	
800 m	Edyta Bielska (POL)	2:07.48	15 May 2022	
