= 2016 IAAF World U20 Championships – Women's heptathlon =

The women's heptathlon event at the 2016 IAAF World U20 Championships was held at Zdzisław Krzyszkowiak Stadium on 21 and 22 July.

== Medalists ==
| Gold | Sarah Lagger; Austria |
| Silver | Adriana Rodríguez; Cuba |
| Bronze | Hanne Maudens; Belgium |

== Records ==
Standing records prior to the 2016 IAAF World U20 Championships in Athletics
| World Junior Record | Carolina Klüft (SWE) | 6542 | Munich, Germany | 10 August 2002 |
| Championship Record | Carolina Klüft (SWE) | 6470 | Kingston, Jamaica | 20 July 2002 |
| World Junior Leading | Alina Shukh (UKR) | 6099 | Lutsk, Ukraine | 19 June 2016 |

== Results ==
=== Final standings ===
The highest mark recorded in each event is highlighted in yellow

| Rank | Athlete | Nationality | 100m H | HJ | SP | 200m | LJ | JT | 800m | Points | Notes |
|---|---|---|---|---|---|---|---|---|---|---|---|
| 1st place, gold medalist(s) | Sarah Lagger | Austria | 14.25 | 1.77 | 13.09 | 24.93 | 5.95 | 43.65 | 2:15.99 | 5960 | NU20R |
| 2nd place, silver medalist(s) | Adriana Rodríguez | Cuba | 13.69 | 1.80 | 12.65 | 23.95 | 5.96 | 37.36 | 2:23.27 | 5925 | PB |
| 3rd place, bronze medalist(s) | Hanne Maudens | Belgium | 14.75 | 1.77 | 11.49 | 24.58 | 6.34 | 40.29 | 2:15.70 | 5881 | PB |
| 4 | Bianca Salming | Sweden | 14.62 | 1.83 | 13.29 | 26.13 | 5.81 | 44.39 | 2:17.69 | 5840 | PB |
| 5 | Lovisa Östervall | Sweden | 13.97 | 1.80 | 10.39 | 24.88 | 6.09 | 36.90 | 2:19.94 | 5723 | PB |
| 6 | Nina Schultz | Canada | 14.13 | 1.77 | 11.53 | 24.79 | 5.57 | 42.84 | 2:24.74 | 5639 | PB |
| 7 | Karin Strametz | Austria | 13.74 | 1.62 | 10.82 | 24.66 | 5.84 | 39.69 | 2:18.61 | 5579 | |
| 8 | Emma Fitzgerald | United States | 14.36 | 1.71 | 10.47 | 25.68 | 5.74 | 50.63 | 2:25.23 | 5577 | PB |
| 9 | Lisa Maihöfer | Germany | 14.33 | 1.80 | 11.08 | 24.95 | 5.79 | 34.72 | 2:22.75 | 5540 | PB |
| 10 | Elisa Pineau | France | 14.89 | 1.77 | 13.23 | 25.72 | 5.96 | 35.94 | 2:25.56 | 5539 | PB |
| 11 | Amanda Marie Frøynes | Norway | 14.92 | 1.71 | 10.34 | 25.86 | 5.78 | 44.35 | 2:15.97 | 5493 | PB |
| 12 | Paola Sarabia | Spain | 14.79 | 1.77 | 10.83 | 25.33 | 5.98 | 37.71 | 2:23.74 | 5491 | |
| 13 | Emma Oosterwegel | Netherlands | 14.52 | 1.68 | 11.65 | 25.62 | 5.27 | 51.51 | 2:26.84 | 5461 | |
| 14 | Carmen Ramos | Spain | 14.46 | 1.65 | 11.60 | 25.00 | 5.44 | 41.39 | 2:19.02 | 5445 | |
| 15 | Alysha Burnett | Australia | 14.55 | 1.74 | 12.55 | 25.80 | 5.64 | 41.74 | 2:32.99 | 5416 | |
| 16 | Kaylee Hinton | United States | 14.12 | 1.74 | 10.37 | 24.95 | 5.66 | 33.23 | 2:25.17 | 5349 | PB |
| 17 | Celeste Mucci | Australia | 13.77 | 1.65 | 11.70 | 25.45 | 5.66 | 39.14 | 2:40.86 | 5254 | |
| 18 | Mareike Rösing | Germany | 14.53 | 1.74 | 10.55 | 25.39 | 5.68 | 33.49 | 2:27.02 | 5252 | |
| 19 | Barbora Zatloukalová | Czech Republic | 14.52 | 1.68 | 9.17 | 25.18 | 5.43 | 36.83 | 2:22.68 | 5155 | |
| 20 | Marijke Esselink | Netherlands | 14.54 | 1.65 | 11.02 | 25.76 | 5.40 | 37.07 | 2:29.85 | 5089 | |
| 21 | Weronika Grzelak | Poland | 14.44 | 1.77 | 12.14 | 24.88 | 5.85 | 38.69 | DQ | 4872 | |
| 22 | Jessica Rautelin | Finland | 14.15 | 1.65 | 11.89 | 25.29 | 5.77 | 38.55 | DQ | 4685 | |
| | Maria Huntington | Finland | 14.26 | 1.68 | 10.88 | 25.92 | DNS | – | – | DNF | |
| | Elizabeth Morland | Ireland | 13.84 | 1.68 | DNS | – | – | – | – | DNF | |
