= 2019 European Athletics U23 Championships – Women's heptathlon =

The women's heptathlon event at the 2019 European Athletics U23 Championships was held in Gävle, Sweden, at Gavlehof Stadium Park on 11 and 12 July.

== Records ==
Prior to the competition, the records were as follows:

| European U23 record | Carolina Klüft (SWE) | 7001 | Paris, France | 24 August 2003 |
| Championship U23 record | Aiga Grabuste (LAT) | 6396 | Kaunas, Lithuania | 19 July 2009 |

== Results ==
=== Final standings ===
The highest mark recorded in each event is highlighted in yellow

| Rank | Athlete | Nationality | 100m H | HJ | SP | 200m | LJ | JT | 800m | Points | Notes |
|---|---|---|---|---|---|---|---|---|---|---|---|
| 1st place, gold medalist(s) | Géraldine Ruckstuhl | Switzerland | 14.22 | 1.76 | 14.58 | 25.22 | 5.87 | 54.82 | 2:12.05 | 6274 | SB |
| 2nd place, silver medalist(s) | Sophie Weißenberg | Germany | 14.21 | 1.82 | 14.18 | 24.67 | 6.04 | 47.92 | 2:20.39 | 6175 | |
| 3rd place, bronze medalist(s) | Hanne Maudens | Belgium | 14.06 | 1.73 | 13.36 | 24.17 | 6.22 | 37.40 | 2:08.79 | 6093 | SB |
| 4 | Emma Oosterwegel | Netherlands | 14.21 | 1.70 | 13.47 | 25.61 | 5.86 | 52.04 | 2:12.68 | 6072 | |
| 5 | Sarah Lagger | Austria | 14.39 | 1.73 | 15.23 | 25.61 | 5.81 | 47.23 | 2:14.23 | 6026 | |
| 6 | Adrianna Sułek | Poland | 14.07 | 1.82 | 12.06 | 24.29 | 5.80 | 42.50 | 2:17.28 | 5954 | |
| 7 | Bianca Salming | Sweden | 15.03 | 1.88 | 13.56 | 27.08 | 5.48 | 48.25 | 2:18.37 | 5754 | |
| 8 | Amanda Marie Grefstad | Norway | 14.70 | 1.73 | 11.59 | 25.89 | 5.77 | 45.70 | 2:12.05 | 5706 | |
| 9 | Claudia Conte | Spain | 14.69 | 1.79 | 11.45 | 26.04 | 5.63 | 46.60 | 2:16.10 | 5677 | |
| 10 | Vanessa Grimm | Germany | 14.28 | 1.64 | 13.79 | 25.10 | 5.70 | 41.34 | 2:20.45 | 5649 | |
| 11 | Jana Novotná | Czech Republic | 14.19 | 1.76 | 10.51 | 25.26 | 5.88 | 38.55 | 2:17.64 | 5614 | |
| 12 | Margit Kalk | Estonia | 14.32 | 1.64 | 12.11 | 24.98 | 5.86 | 43.25 | 2:22.32 | 5603 | PB |
| 13 | Kateřina Dvořáková | Czech Republic | 14.14 | 1.76 | 11.42 | 25.19 | 5.63 | 34.65 | 2:17.33 | 5542 | |
| 14 | Cassandre Aguessy Thomas | France | 14.54 | 1.76 | 12.63 | 24.98 | 5.48 | 37.39 | 2:21.69 | 5535 | |
| 15 | Alina Shukh | Ukraine | 15.03 | 1.79 | 13.50 | 27.73 | 5.60 | 44.28 | 2:19.22 | 5530 | |
| 16 | Iryna Rofe-Beketova | Ukraine | 14.27 | 1.73 | 13.33 | 26.41 | 5.79 | 40.71 | 2:28.57 | 5521 | |
| 17 | Célia Perron | France | 14.16 | 1.70 | 10.91 | 25.80 | 5.61 | 38.47 | 2:12.49 | 5514 | |
| 18 | Kristine Deruma | Latvia | 15.90 | 1.70 | 12.54 | 25.77 | 5.61 | 37.79 | 2:27.10 | 5183 | |
| 19 | Lydia Boll | Switzerland | 15.10 | 1.58 | 11.60 | 26.00 | 5.35 | 39.58 | 2:19.25 | 5122 | |
| 20 | Lovisa Östervall | Sweden | 14.73 | 1.73 | 11.15 | 25.95 | 5.56 | 38.45 | | 4531 | |
| | Emilie Berge | Norway | 14.50 | 1.61 | 12.01 | 26.52 | 5.34 | 35.90 | DNS | DNF | |
| | Irma Gunnarsdóttir | Iceland | 15.42 | 1.52 | 12.25 | 26.30 | 5.43 | DNS | – | DNF | |
| | Elizabeth Morland | Ireland | 14.44 | 1.73 | 12.28 | 25.85 | DNS | – | – | DNF | |
| | Ida Eikeng | Norway | 13.93 | 1.61 | 13.13 | DNS | – | – | – | DNF | |
| | Maria Huntington | Finland | 13.89 | 1.85 | 11.87 | DNS | – | – | – | DNF | |
| | Soléne Ndama | France | 13.38 | NM | – | – | – | – | – | DNF | |
