= 2022 World Athletics Combined Events Tour =

- Edition: 24th
- Dates: 18 December 2021 – 18 September 2022; 30 April – 18 September (Gold)
- Meetings: 15 (Total); 6 (Gold)

The 2022 World Athletics Combined Events Tour was the 24th edition of the global series of combined track and field event meetings organised by the World Athletics. This was the first season to feature three-tier World Tour format, dividing the meetings into 3 competition sub groups: Gold, Silver and Bronze Level.

The winners were Lindon Victor from Grenada and Adrianna Sułek from Poland.

== Rules ==
Athletes were ranked by their best three World Athletics ranking points scores achieved during the period of 1 October 2021 – 30 September 2022. Ranking points were allowed to be collected on both outdoor (decathlon/heptathlon) and indoor (heptathlon/pentathlon) events. While at least two of the scores had to come from the Combined Events Tour meetings, one could have came from major competitions on the International Calendar.

The total prize money was US$202,000, split evenly between male and female athletes. The male and female winners each received $30,000, while second and third placed athletes were entitled to $20,000 and $15,000 respectively. Smaller prizes were given to the rest of the top eight finishers.

== Calendar ==
The calendar featured 6 Gold, 2 Silver, 6 Bronze Level and also one Challenger meeting.

Gold Level

Date	Event	Location	Country	Results	Ref.
30 April – 1 May	Multistars	Stadio Zecchini, Grosseto	Italy		
7–8 May	Mehrkampf-Meeting Ratingen	Stadionring, Ratingen	Germany		
14–15 May	Wiesław Czapiewski Memorial	Zdzislaw Krzyszkowiak Stadium, Bydgoszcz	Poland		
28–29 May	Hypo-Meeting	Mösle-Stadium, Götzis	Austria	Results	
4–5 June	Meeting Internacional Arona	Antonio Domínguez Stadium, Arona	Spain		
17–18 September	Décastar	Stade Pierre Paul Bernard, Talence	France		
