= Léonie Cambours =

French athletics competitor

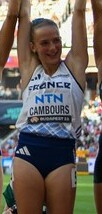
- Cambours in 2023

Personal information
- Born: 31 July 2000 (age 25)

Sport
- Country: France
- Sport: Track and field
Medal record
French Athletics Championships
Bronze medal – third place	2020 Albi	High jump

Léonie Cambours (born 31 July 2000) is a French athletics competitor. She competed in the women's pentathlon at the 2022 World Athletics Indoor Championships held in Belgrade, Serbia.

She won the bronze medal in the women's high jump event at the French Athletics Championships held in Albi, France.

== International competitions ==
Year	Competition	Venue	Position	Event	Notes
Representing France
2021	European U23 Championships	Tallinn, Estonia	–	Heptathlon (U23)	DNF
2021	European U23 Championships	Tallinn, Estonia	15th (q)	Long jump	6.07 m
2022	World Indoor Championships	Belgrade, Serbia	7th	Pentathlon	4442 pts
2022	European Championships	Munich, Germany	14th	Heptathlon	4949 pts
2023	European Indoor Championships	Istanbul, Turkey	–	Pentathlon	DNF
2023	World Championships	Budapest, Hungary	15th	Heptathlon	5939 pts
