= Annik Kälin =

Swiss pentathlete

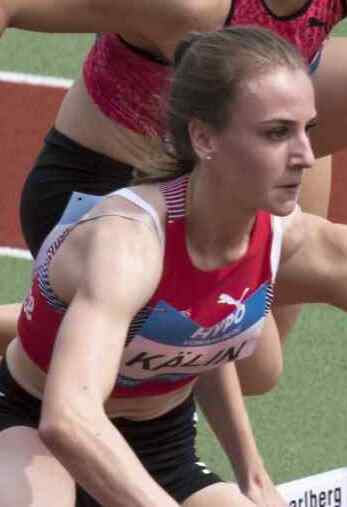
- Kälin in 2018

Personal information
- Born: 27 April 2000 (age 26) Einsiedeln, Switzerland
- Height: 1.71 m (5 ft 7 in)

Sport
- Sport: Athletics
- Event: Heptathlon
Medal record
Women's athletics
Representing Switzerland
World Indoor Championships
Silver medal – second place	2025 Nanjing	Long jump
European Championships
Bronze medal – third place	2022 Munich	Heptathlon
European Indoor Championships
Silver medal – second place	2025 Apeldoorn	Long jump

Annik Kälin (born 27 April 2000) is a Swiss athlete who competes in the heptathlon and pentathlon.

== International competitions ==
Year	Competition	Venue	Position	Event	Notes
Representing Switzerland
2016	European Youth Championships	Tbilisi, Georgia	12th	Long jump	5.31 m
2016	European Youth Championships	Tbilisi, Georgia	20th	Heptathlon	5114 pts
2017	European U20 Championships	Grosseto, Italy	15th (sf)	100 m hurdles	14.47 s
2017	European U20 Championships	Grosseto, Italy	17th (q)	Long jump	6.05 m
2018	World U20 Championships	Tampere, Finland	6th	Heptathlon	5664 pts
2018	European Championships	Berlin, Germany	21st	Heptathlon	5572 pts
2019	European U20 Championships	Borås, Sweden	3rd	Heptathlon	6069 pts
2021	European Indoor Championships	Toruń, Poland	–	Pentathlon	DNF
2022	World Championships	Eugene, United States	6th	Heptathlon	6464 pts
2022	European Championships	Munich, Germany	3rd	Heptathlon	6515 pts
2023	European Indoor Championships	Istanbul, Turkey	6th	Long jump	6.61 m
2023	World Championships	Budapest, Hungary	–	Heptathlon	DNF
2024	World Indoor Championships	Glasgow, United Kingdom	6th	Long jump	6.75 m
2024	European Championships	Rome, Italy	6th	Long jump	6.82 m
2024	European Championships	Rome, Italy	4th	Heptathlon	6490 pts
2024	Olympic Games	Paris, France	4th	Heptathlon	6639 pts
2025	European Indoor Championships	Apeldoorn, Netherlands	2nd	Long jump	6.90 m
2025	World Indoor Championships	Nanjing, China	2nd	Long jump	6.83 m
2025	World Championships	Tokyo, Japan	25th (q)	Long jump	6.36 m
2026	World Indoor Championships	Toruń, Poland	16th	Long jump	6.31 m
2026	European Championships	Birmingham, United Kingdom	4th	Heptathlon	6630 pts
