= Yuliya Loban =

Ukrainian hepathlete

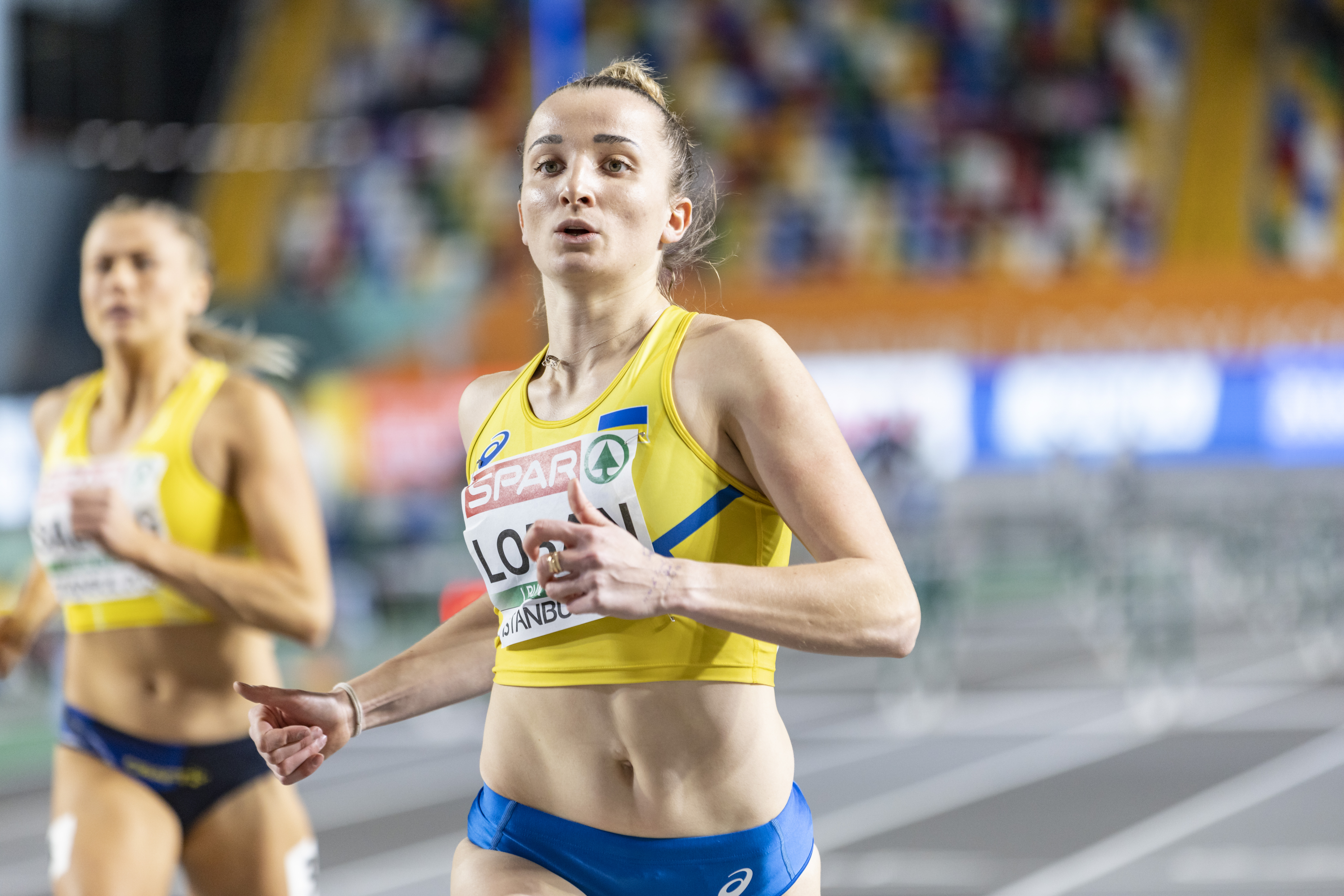
- Yuliya Loban in 2023

Personal information
- Born: 7 August 2000 (age 24)

Sport
- Sport: Athletics
- Event(s): Heptathlon, pentathlon

Yuliya Loban (Ukrainian: Юлія Лобан; born 7 August 2000) is a Ukrainian athlete competing in the combined events. She won a silver medal at the 2021 World University Games (held in 2023).

== International competitions ==
Year	Competition	Venue	Position	Event	Notes
Representing Ukraine
2019	European U20 Championships	Borås, Sweden	12th	Heptathlon	5281 pts
2021	European U23 Championships	Tallinn, Estonia	10th	Heptathlon	5638 pts
2022	World Indoor Championships	Belgrade, Serbia	10th	Pentathlon	4192 pts
2022	Balkan Championships	Craiova, Romania	1st	Heptathlon	5681 pts
2022	European Championships	Munich, Germany	12th	Heptathlon	5846 pts
2023	European Indoor Championships	Istanbul, Turkey	12th	Pentathlon	4091 pts
2023	World University Games	Chengdu, China	2nd	Heptathlon	6063 pts
2024	World Indoor Championships	Glasgow, United Kingdom	6th	Pentathlon	4402 pts
2024	European Championships	Rome, Italy	–	Heptathlon	DNF
2025	European Indoor Championships	Apeldoorn, Netherlands	12th	Pentathlon	4277 pts
2025	World Indoor Championships	Nanjing, China	12th	Pentathlon	4124 pts

== Personal bests ==
- 200 metres – 24.77 (+0.7 m/s, Götzis 2023)
- 800 metres – 2:16.32 (Chengdu 2023)
- 800 metres short track – 2:18.44 (Tallinn (i) 2024)
- 60 metres hurdles – 8.40 (Kyiv (i) 2023)
- 100 metres hurdles – 13.82 (+0.2 m/s, Götzis 2023)
- High Jump – 1.78 (Tallinn (i) 2022)
- Long Jump – 6.14 (Kyiv (i) 2024)
- Shot Put – 15.50 (Bakhmut 2021)
- Javelin Throw – 46.44 (Kyiv 2023)
- Heptathlon – 6065 (Götzis 2023)
- Pentathlon short track – 4537 (Tallinn (i) 2024)
