= Claudia Conte =

Spanish athletics competitor

Personal information
- Full name: Claudia Conte Martínez
- Born: 14 November 1999 (age 26) Benicàssim, Spain
- Height: 1.70 m (5 ft 7 in)
- Weight: 59 kg (130 lb)

Sport
- Sport: Athletics
- Event: Heptathlon
- Club: Playas de Castellón
- Coached by: Manuela Alonso

Claudia Conte Martínez (born 14 November 1999) is a Spanish heptathlete. She won a silver medal at the 2021 European U23 Championships.

== International competitions ==
Year	Competition	Venue	Position	Event	Notes
Representing Spain
2018	World U20 Championships	Tampere, Finland	10th	Heptathlon	5590 pts
2019	European U23 Championships	Gävle, Sweden	9th	Heptathlon	5677 pts
2021	European U23 Championships	Tallinn, Estonia	2nd	Heptathlon	6186 pts
2022	World Indoor Championships	Belgrade, Serbia	6th	Pentathlon	4499 pts
2022	World Championships	Eugene, United States	9th	Heptathlon	6194 pts
2022	European Championships	Munich, Germany	–	Heptathlon	DNF

== Personal bests ==
Outdoor

- 200 metres – 24.77 (+1.5 m/s, Eugene 2022)
- 800 metres – 2:09.93 (Arona 2021)
- 100 metres hurdles – 13.65 (+1.4 m/s, Eugene 2022)
- High jump – 1.88 (Arona 2021)
- Long jump – 6.33 (+0.5 m/s, Castellón 2022)
- Shot put – 12.99 (Arona 2022)
- Javelin throw – 49.89 (Getafe 2021)
- Heptathlon – 6194 (Eugene 2022)

Indoor

- 800 metres – 2:12.73 (Aubiére 2022)
- 60 metres hurdles – 8.59 (Ourense 2022)
- High jump – 1.83 (Belgrade 2022)
- Long jump – 6.13 (Belgrade 2022)
- Shot put – 12.73 (Belgrade 2022)
- Pentathlon – 4499 (Belgrade 2022)
