= 2021 European Athletics U23 Championships – Women's heptathlon =

Women's heptathlon at the 2021 European Athletics U23 Championships
- Venue: Kadriorg Stadium, Tallinn
- Dates: 8–9 July
- Competitors: 21 from 14 nations
- Winning points: 6305

Medalists
gold medal	Adrianna Sułek	Poland
silver medal	Claudia Conte	Spain
bronze medal	Holly Mills	Great Britain

The women's heptathlon event at the 2021 European Athletics U23 Championships was held in Tallinn, Estonia, at Kadriorg Stadium on 8 and 9 July.

== Records ==
Prior to the competition, the records were as follows:

European U23 record	Carolina Klüft (SWE)	7001	Paris, France	24 August 2003
Championship U23 record	Aiga Grabuste (LAT)	6396	Kaunas, Lithuania	19 July 2009

== Results ==
=== Final standings ===
The highest mark recorded in each event is highlighted in yellow

Rank	Athlete	Nationality	100m H	HJ	SP	200m	LJ	JT	800m	Points	Notes
1st place, gold medalist(s)	Adrianna Sułek	Poland	13.43	1.84	13.16	23.69	6.03	40.89	2:12.79	6305	
2nd place, silver medalist(s)	Claudia Conte	Spain	13.92	1.84	11.63	24.89	6.19	47.04	2:12.93	6186	PB
3rd place, bronze medalist(s)	Holly Mills	Great Britain	13.40	1.72	13.62	24.06	6.20	37.38	2:16.07	6095	
4	Sarah Lagger	Austria	14.05	1.75	13.82	25.39	5.88	47.99	2:15.51	6040	
5	Kristīne Blaževiča	Latvia	13.85	1.75	12.39	24.96	6.19	41.39	2:13.64	6007	PB
6	Jade O'Dowda	Great Britain	13.81	1.69	12.86	24.56	6.14	42.13	2:13.94	6002	
7	Julia Słocka	Poland	14.07	1.72	12.68	24.71	5.68	46.24	2:22.45	5798	
8	Louise Maraval	France	13.80	1.63	11.54	23.80	6.08	33.94	2:15.09	5725	
9	Edyta Bielska	Poland	14.38	1.69	11.58	25.00	5.76	42.93	2:12.75	5713	PB
10	Yuliya Loban	Ukraine	14.37	1.69	14.05	25.62	5.68	40.69	2:21.24	5638	
11	Sandra Röthlin	Switzerland	14.09	1.63	12.77	25.12	5.63	40.68	2:15.95	5622	
12	Auriana Lazraq-Khlass	France	14.23	1.69	11.40	25.15	6.19	31.34	2:19.56	5521	
13	Elise Hoel Ulseth	Norway	14.11	1.66	11.14	25.94	5.80	41.21	2:25.50	5405	
14	Katre Sofia Palm	Estonia	14.19	1.66	11.56	25.56	5.62	31.60	2:28.94	5174	
15	Lydia Boll	Switzerland	14.11	1.66	NM	25.12	5.90	45.72	2:16.54	5112	
	Léonie Cambours	France	14.23	1.75	13.26	24.35	NM	33.14	DNS	DNF	
	Marta Giaele Giovannini	Italy	13.85	1.63	10.07	25.04	5.88	DNS		DNF	
	Beatričė Juškevičiūtė	Lithuania	14.27	1.63	13.84	25.00	NM	DNS		DNF	
	Kate O'Connor	Ireland	14.19	1.72	14.00	25.49	5.48	DNS		DNF	
	Jodie Smith	Great Britain	13.88	1.66	10.73	24.95	DNS			DNF	
	Klara Rådbo	Sweden	14.29	NM	DNS					DNF	
