= 2018 IAAF World U20 Championships – Women's heptathlon =

Women's heptathlon at the 2018 World U20 Championships
- Venue: Ratina Stadium
- Dates: 12–13 July
- Competitors: 26 from 19 nations
- Winning points: 6253

Medalists
gold medal	Niamh Emerson	Great Britain
silver medal	Sarah Lagger	Austria
bronze medal	Adrianna Sułek	Poland

The women's heptathlon at the 2018 IAAF World U20 Championships was held at Ratina Stadium on 12 and 13 July.

== Records ==
Standing records prior to the 2018 IAAF World U20 Championships in Athletics
World U20 Record	Carolina Klüft (SWE)	6542	Munich, Germany	10 August 2002
Championship Record	Carolina Klüft (SWE)	6470	Kingston, Jamaica	20 July 2002
World U20 Leading	Alina Shukh (UKR)	6177	Götzis, Austria	27 May 2018

== Results ==
The highest mark recorded in each event is highlighted in yellow

Rank	Athlete	Nationality	100m H	HJ	SP	200m	LJ	JT	800m	Points	Notes
1st place, gold medalist(s)	Niamh Emerson	Great Britain	13.76	1.89	12.27	24.80	6.31	39.02	2:09.74	6253	WU20L
2nd place, silver medalist(s)	Sarah Lagger	Austria	14.21	1.77	14.38	24.86	6.15	45.76	2:11.53	6225	NU20R
3rd place, bronze medalist(s)	Adrianna Sułek	Poland	13.80	1.62	13.21	24.02	6.06	39.35	2:12.38	5939	NU20R
4	Adriana Rodríguez	Cuba	13.55	1.74	12.56	23.90	6.31	34.74	2:24.52	5910	
5	Celeste Mucci	Australia	13.29	1.77	11.12	24.88	6.13	44.28	2:29.30	5865	
6	Annik Kälin	Switzerland	13.90	1.77	11.40	25.54	6.11	37.73	2:24.46	5664	
7	Jade O'Dowda	Great Britain	14.04	1.71	12.33	25.03	6.10	35.05	2:21.74	5660	PB
8	Ida Eikeng	Norway	13.55	1.71	11.66	24.18	5.64	45.81	2:35.45	5658	
9	Anna Hall	United States	14.13	1.83	10.64	24.60	5.74	32.44	2:15.19	5655	PB
10	Claudia Conte	Spain	14.47	1.77	11.55	25.68	5.81	40.12	2:20.40	5590	NU20R
11	Ida Thunberg	Sweden	13.93	1.62	12.20	25.39	5.92	47.06	2:31.77	5571	
12	Andrea Obetzhofer	Austria	14.28	1.68	13.54	25.04	5.49	42.41	2:29.06	5531	
13	Jana Novotná	Czech Republic	14.00	1.71	10.60	25.05	5.76	38.27	2:20.55	5523	
14	Camryn Newton-Smith	Australia	14.21	1.65	11.34	25.59	5.66	44.97	2:23.11	5487	PB
14	Marijke Esselink	Netherlands	13.93	1.68	12.27	25.37	5.48	41.80	2:26.21	5487	
16	Sterling Lester	United States	13.65	1.68	10.72	23.87	5.50	26.01	2:11.08	5478	PB
17	Darya Dikhanova	Ukraine	13.92	1.74	10.25	24.87	5.37	29.53	2:15.45	5355	
18	Sanni Pajasmaa	Finland	14.49	1.65	12.67	25.34	5.64	34.50	2:24.81	5329	PB
19	Johanna Siebler	Germany	14.29	1.53	13.34	26.26	5.61	43.19	2:28.12	5296	PB
20	Anna Øbakke Lange	Denmark	15.76	1.56	13.10	25.81	5.59	44.03	2:23.12	5234	NU20R
21	Agathe Guillemot	France	14.62	1.65	10.84	25.27	5.41	28.56	2:09.37	5231	
22	Urtė Bačianskaitė	Lithuania	15.16	1.62	13.87	26.45	5.49	39.92	2:31.79	5157	
23	Margit Kalk	Estonia	14.93	1.65	11.16	25.97	5.47	40.21	2:26.79	5148	
24	Mathilde Rey	Switzerland	14.54	1.71	12.04	25.83	5.52	41.55	DQ	4649	PB
	Erika Wärff	Sweden	15.18	1.77	12.86	26.50	DNS	–	–	DNF	
	Alina Shukh	Ukraine	14.68	DNS	–	–	–	–	–	DNF	
