= Noor Vidts =

Belgian heptathlete (born 1996)

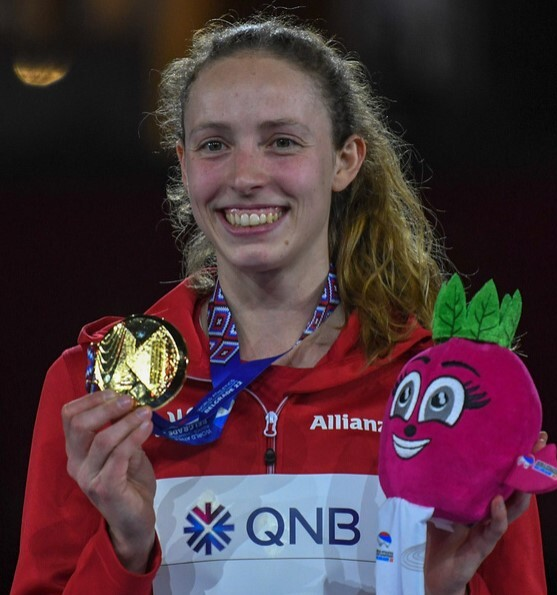
- Vidts at the 2022 World Indoor Championships in Belgrade

Personal information
- Born: 30 May 1996 (age 30) Vilvoorde, Belgium
- Education: Catholic University of Leuven
- Height: 1.76 m (5 ft 9 in)

Sport
- Country: Belgium
- Sport: Athletics
- Events: Heptathlon, Pentathlon
- Club: Vilvoorde Atletiekclub
- Coached by: Fernando Oliva

Achievements and titles
- Personal bests: Heptathlon: 6707 (Paris 2024); Indoors; Pentathlon: 4929 (Belgrade 2022)
Medal record
Women's athletics
Representing Belgium
Olympic Games
Bronze medal – third place	2024 Paris	Heptathlon
European Championships
Bronze medal – third place	2024 Rome	Heptathlon
World Indoor Championships
Gold medal – first place	2022 Belgrade	Pentathlon
Gold medal – first place	2024 Glasgow	Pentathlon
European Indoor Championships
Silver medal – second place	2021 Torun	Pentathlon
Bronze medal – third place	2023 Istanbul	Pentathlon

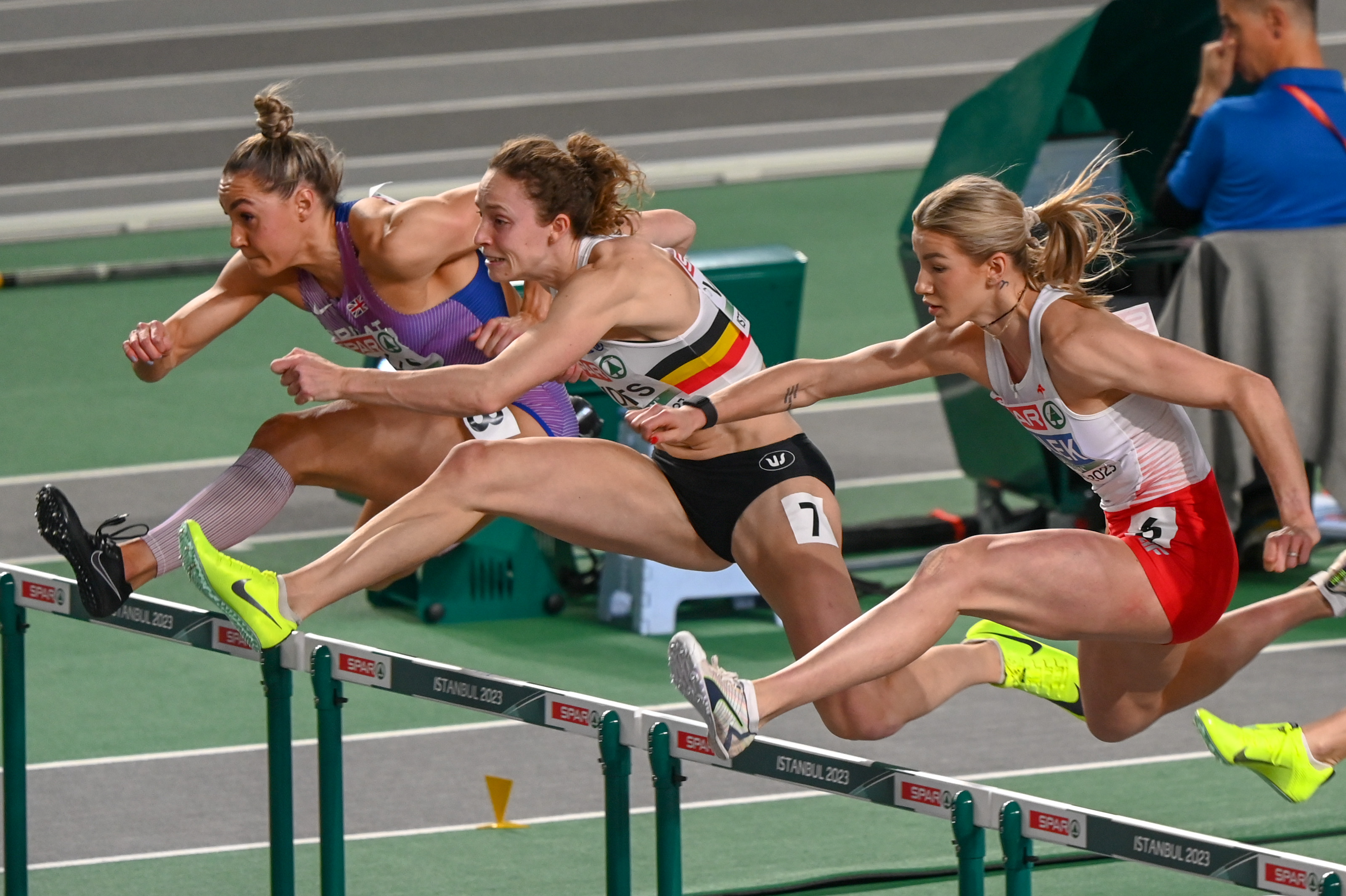
Vidts (centre) hurdles at the 2023 European Indoor Championships in Istanbul

Noor Vidts (born 30 May 1996) is a Belgian athlete competing in the combined events. She won the gold medal in the pentathlon at the 2022 and 2024 World Indoor Championships. Vidts won the bronze medal in the heptathlon at the 2024 Paris Olympics, having placed fourth in the event at the Tokyo Olympics held in 2021. She earned silver and bronze for the pentathlon at the 2021 and 2023 European Indoor Championships respectively.

At the 2022 World Indoor Championships held in Belgrade, Serbia, Vidts set a Belgian pentathlon record, slicing 24 points off Nafissatou Thiam's previous best. She won four national titles.

She won her first medal at a major outdoor championship, the bronze in the heptathlon, at the 2024 European Athletics Championships in Rome, Italy.

== Personal life ==
Vidts is married to Belgian judoka Jorre Verstraeten.

== Achievements ==
=== International competitions ===
Representing Belgium
Year	Competition	Venue	Position	Event	Result
2013	World Youth Championships	Donetsk, Ukraine	15th	Heptathlon (U18)	5289 pts
2014	World Junior Championships	Eugene, United States	16th	Heptathlon	5342 pts
2015	European Junior Championships	Eskilstuna, Sweden	4th	Heptathlon	5652 pts
2017	European U23 Championships	Bydgoszcz, Poland	5th	Heptathlon	5924 pts
2017	Universiade	Taipei, Taiwan	3rd	Heptathlon	5728 pts
2018	European Championships	Berlin, Germany	20th	Heptathlon	5598 pts
2019	World Championships	Doha, Qatar	15th	Heptathlon	5989 pts
2021	European Indoor Championships	Toruń, Poland	2nd	Pentathlon	4791 pts
2021	Olympic Games	Tokyo, Japan	4th	Heptathlon	6571 pts
2022	World Indoor Championships	Belgrade, Serbia	1st	Pentathlon	4929 pts NR
2022	World Championships	Eugene, United States	5th	Heptathlon	6559 pts
2022	European Championships	Munich, Germany	4th	Heptathlon	6467 pts
2023	European Indoor Championships	Istanbul, Turkey	3rd	Pentathlon	4823 pts
2023	World Championships	Budapest, Hungary	6th	Heptathlon	6450 pts
2024	World Indoor Championships	Glasgow, Scotland	1st	Pentathlon	4773 pts
2024	European Championships	Rome, Italy	3rd	Heptathlon	6596 pts
2024	Olympic Games	Paris, France	3rd	Heptathlon	6707 pts PB
2026	European Championships	Birmingham, United Kingdom	11th	Heptathlon	6286 pts

=== Personal bests ===
- Heptathlon – 6707 pts (Paris 2024)
  - 100 m hurdles – 13.10 s (−0.1 m/s, Paris 2024)
  - High jump – 1.84 m (La Nucia 2019)
  - Shot put – 14.79 m (Rome 2024)
  - 200 metres – 23.70 s (+1.5 m/s, Tokyo 2021)
  - Long jump – 6.46 m (Rome 2024)
  - Javelin throw – 45.00 m (Paris 2024)
  - 800 metres – 2:06.38 min (Paris 2024)
- 100 metres – 12.14 s (+0.6 m/s, Ninove 2017)

Indoors

- Pentathlon – 4929 pts (Belgrade 2022)
  - 60 m hurdles – 8.15 s (Belgrade 2022)
  - High jump – 1.84 m (Antequera 2019)
  - Shot put – 14.26 m (Glasgow 2024)
  - Long jump – 6.60 m (Belgrade 2022)
  - 800 metres – 2:08.81 min (Belgrade 2022)
- 60 metres indoor – 7.82 s (Ghent 2018)

=== National titles ===
- Belgian Athletics Championships
  - Heptathlon: 2019, 2020
- Belgian Indoor Athletics Championships
  - Pentathlon: 2017, 2018
