= Athletics at the 2024 Summer Olympics – Women's heptathlon =

Women's heptathlon at the Games of the XXXIII Olympiad
- Olympic Athletics
- Venue: Stade de France, Paris, France
- Date: August 8 and 9 2024
- Competitors: 23 from 14 nations
- Winning points: 6880

Medalists
1st place, gold medalist(s)		Nafissatou Thiam	Belgium
2nd place, silver medalist(s)		Katarina Johnson-Thompson	Great Britain
3rd place, bronze medalist(s)		Noor Vidts	Belgium

The women's heptathlon at the 2024 Summer Olympics was held in Paris, France, on 8 and 9 August 2024. This was the 11th time that the event was contested at the Summer Olympics. Nafissatou Thiam became the first women ever to win the gold medal in heptathlon three Olympics in a row.

== Summary ==
This was the 11th appearance of the heptathlon event, having appeared in every Olympic athletics programme since 1984. The event featured the entire podium from the previous edition, as well as the podium from the two most recent world championships. Reigning Olympic champion Nafissatou Thiam was aiming to become the first woman to successfully win three Olympic heptathlon titles. Reining world champion Katarina Johnson-Thompson was looking to win her first Olympic medal, after finishing off the podium in the past three editions. Other medal contenders were double world indoor champion Noor Vidts, who finished fourth in the previous edition, returning Olympic silver medalist Anouk Vetter and multiple world-medalists Anna Hall.

=== Day one ===
In the first event, the 100 m hurdles, Annik Kälin of Switzerland recorded the fastest time. Her time of 12.87 s was a personal best. Additionally, Kälin was the only athlete to record a time under 13 seconds. The top 3 was rounded out by American Taliyah Brooks and Noor Vidts, the latter also running a personal best. Johnson-Thompson, finishing in eight, recorded a season's best.

Drama came in the second event, the high jump, for American Chari Hawkins, who had three failed attempts at her opening height of 1.71 m. This meant that she had scored 0 points in the event and that winning a medal became virtually impossible for her. Nevertheless, she decided to continue her heptathlon after this event. For the longest time, it was a three-way battle between Thiam, Johnson-Thompson and Hall. Thiam was the first of the three to go clear at 1.92 m. Johnson-Thompson and Hall both recorded two failures on their first two attempts. On her third attempt, Johnson-Thompson cleared the bar, whereas Hall did not. This meant that Johnson-Thompson would continue with Thiam on the next height, 1.95 m. Ultimately, both women recorded three failures at this height, meaning both women were awarded the same amount of points. Lower in the standings, Kälin and Vetter both recorded season's bests.

The heptathlon continued in the shot put. Thiam extended her winning streak, recording a season's best of 15.54 m, almost half a meter clear of second place finisher Vetter. Vetter recorded a distance of 15.07, which was the only other distance to cross the 15 m mark. Vidts finished in third, with a distance of 14.57 m. Emma Oosterwegel, in fourth, and Johnson-Thompson, in fifth, both recorded personal bests.

The final event of the first day was the 200 metres. The event was won by Johnson-Thompson, who recorded a time of 23.44 s. Italian Sveva Gerevini and Dutchwoman Sofie Dokter rounded out the top 3. Thiam, who finished in 13th, recorded a seasons-best.

After the first day, Johnson-Thompson had the lead with 4055 points, 48 points ahead of second-placer Thiam. Hall rounded out the top 3, with a total of 3956 points.

=== Day two ===
The second day started with the long jump. The event was won by Martha Araújo, who took the win with a jump of 6.61 m in her final attempt. Kälin finished in second, just two centimetres behind the Colombian. Thiam, Vidts and Johnson-Thompson all followed, with just 1 centimetre separating the three of them. Vetter attained a small injury during the event, deciding to withdraw from the heptathlon after this event.

The penultimate event was the javelin throw. In the absence of Vetter, Thiam won the javelin throw, recording a season's best. Vetter's teammate Oosterwegel and Irish athlete Kate O'Connor rounded out the top 3. A bit lower down in the standings, Hall and Vidts both recorded personal bests.

The final event was the 800 metres. Prior to the event, Thiam had a 121-point lead over Johnson-Thompson. Despite this, the fight for the gold was going to be close, as Johnson-Thompson was a significantly better 800 meter-runner than Thiam. Vidts, Kälin and Hall were in 3rd, 4th and 5th place respectively.

At the gun, Hall immediately went to the front, creating a 5-meter gap with the rest of the field. Behind her, a chasing group formed of Johnson-Thompson, Vidts and Thiam respectively. At the bell, Hall recorded the fastest split time of 58.8 s. Johnson-Thompson and Vidts were behind her, recording a time of just over 1 minute. Thiam had fallen further to the back, meanwhile Hungarian Xénia Krizsán had joined Johnson-Thompson and Vidts in the chasing group. At the finish line, Hall claimed victory in the event. Johnson-Thompson finished right behind her in second, after distancing herself from the rest of the chasing group in the home stretch. After that, Vidts and Krizsán crossed the finish line. Thiam ended up finishing a few seconds later, in 9th place. Due to the fast-paced races, 9 out of the 10 first finishers recorded personal bests, with event winner Hall being the sole exception.

After the scores of the final event were calculated and added up, Thiam emerged victorious, with a total of 6880 points. Johnson-Thompson finished in second, just 32 points behind Thiam. With this victory, Thiam became the most successful athlete in Olympic heptathlon history, as she is now the only athlete with 3 gold medals in the event. Johnson-Thompson's silver medal meant she won her first Olympic medal at her fourth Olympics. Vidts claimed the bronze medal in a personal best of 6707 points, also winning her first Olympic medal. Rounding out the top 5 were Kälin and Hall.

== Records ==
Prior to the competition, the existing world, Olympic, and area records were as follows:

Record	Athlete (nation)	Score (pts)	Location	Date
World record	Jackie Joyner-Kersee (USA)	7291	Seoul, South Korea	23-24 September 1988
Olympic record	Jackie Joyner-Kersee (USA)	7291	Seoul, South Korea	23-24 September 1988
World leading	Nafissatou Thiam (BEL)	6848	Rome, Italy	8-9 June 2024

Area	Score (pts)	Athlete	Nation
Africa (records)	6423	Margaret Simpson	Ghana
Asia (records)	6942	Ghada Shouaa	Syria
Europe (records)	7032	Carolina Klüft	Sweden
North, Central America and Caribbean (records)	7291 WR	Jackie Joyner-Kersee	United States
Oceania (records)	6695	Jane Flemming	Australia
South America (records)	6346	Evelis Aguilar	Colombia

== Qualification ==
For the women's heptathlon event, the qualification period is between 1 July 2023 and 30 June 2024.

== Schedule ==
All times are Central European Summer Time (UTC+2)

The women's heptathlon took place over two consecutive days, with 4 events on the first day and 3 events on the second day.

Date	Time	Round
8 August 2024	10:05; 11:05; 19:35; 20:55	100 metres hurdles High jump Shot put 200 metres
9 August 2024	10:05; 11:20; 20:15	Long jump Javelin throw 800 metres

== Results ==
=== 100 metres hurdles ===
Wind:
Heat 1: +0.1 m/s, Heat 2: 0.0 m/s, Heat 3: -0.1 m/s

German athlete Sophie Weißenberg was injured during warmup and had to withdraw from competition.

Rank	Heat	Name	Nationality	Time	Points	Notes
1	3	Annik Kälin	Switzerland	12.87	1144	PB
2	3	Taliyah Brooks	United States	13.00	1124	SB
3	3	Noor Vidts	Belgium	13.10	1109	PB
4	3	Martha Araújo	Colombia	13.15	1102	
5	3	Chari Hawkins	United States	13.16	1100	
6	1	Adrianna Sułek-Schubert	Poland	13.32	1077	SB
7	3	Anna Hall	United States	13.36	1071	
8	1	Katarina Johnson-Thompson	Great Britain	13.40	1065	SB
9	3	Sveva Gerevini	Italy	13.40	1065	
10	2	Emma Oosterwegel	Netherlands	13.41	1063	SB
11	2	Carolin Schäfer	Germany	13.42	1062	
12	2	Camryn Newton-Smith	Australia	13.46	1056	
13	2	Anouk Vetter	Netherlands	13.49	1052	
14	1	Jade O'Dowda	Great Britain	13.53	1046	SB
15	3	Auriana Lazraq-Khlass	France	13.54	1044	
16	2	Nafissatou Thiam	Belgium	13.56	1041	
17	1	Sofie Dokter	Netherlands	13.57	1040	SB
18	1	Xénia Krizsán	Hungary	13.61	1034	SB
19	2	Saga Vanninen	Finland	13.61	1034	
20	1	Tori West	Australia	13.62	1033	PB
21	1	Rita Nemes	Hungary	13.82	1004	
22	1	Kate O'Connor	Ireland	14.08	967	
–	2	Sophie Weißenberg	Germany	DNS		

=== High jump ===
Key

- o = Height cleared
- x = Height failed
- – = Height passed
- r = Retired
- SB = Season's best
- PB = Personal best
- NR = National record
- AR = Area record
- OR = Olympic record
- WR = World record
- WL = World lead
- NM = No mark
- DNS = Did not start
- DQ = Disqualified

Rank	Group	Name	Nation	1.56	1.59	1.62	1.65	1.68	1.71	1.74	1.77	1.80	1.83	1.86	1.89	1.92	1.95	Result	Points	Notes	Overall points	Overall rank
1	B	Nafissatou Thiam	Belgium	–	–	–	–	–	–	–	–	o	–	o	o	o	xxx	1.92	1132		2173	2
2	B	Katarina Johnson-Thompson	Great Britain	–	–	–	–	–	–	–	o	o	o	xo	xo	xxo	xxx	1.92	1132	SB	2197	1
3	B	Anna Hall	United States	–	–	–	–	–	o	o	o	xo	o	xo	xo	xxx		1.89	1093	SB	2164	3
4	B	Sofie Dokter	Netherlands	–	–	–	–	–	o	o	o	o	xxo	xo	xxr			1.86	1054	SB	2094	5
5	B	Noor Vidts	Belgium	–	–	–	–	o	o	o	o	xxo	o	xxx				1.83	1016		2125	4
6	B	Jade O'Dowda	Great Britain	–	–	–	–	o	o	o	o	o	xxx					1.80	978		2024	9
7	B	Camryn Newton-Smith	Australia	–	–	–	o	o	o	o	xxo	o	xxx					1.80	978		2034	8
8	B	Taliyah Brooks	United States	–	–	–	–	–	o	o	xo	xxx						1.77	941		2065	6
8	B	Adrianna Sułek-Schubert	Poland	–	–	–	–	–	o	o	xo	xxx						1.77	941		2018	10
10	A	Kate O'Connor	Ireland	–	–	o	o	o	o	o	xxo	xxr						1.77	941	SB	1908	19
11	A	Xénia Krizsán	Hungary	–	–	o	o	o	xo	o	xxo	xxr						1.77	941	SB	1975	11
11	A	Rita Nemes	Hungary	–	–	–	o	o	xo	o	xxo	xxx						1.77	941		1945	16
13	A	Annik Kälin	Switzerland	–	–	o	o	o	o	o	xxx							1.74	903	SB	2047	7
14	B	Saga Vanninen	Finland	–	–	o	o	xo	o	o	xxx							1.74	903		1937	17
14	A	Anouk Vetter	Netherlands	–	–	–	xo	o	o	o	xxx							1.74	903	SB	1955	15
16	B	Sveva Gerevini	Italy	–	–	o	o	o	xxo	xo	xxx							1.74	903		1968	13
17	A	Emma Oosterwegel	Netherlands	–	–	o	o	xxo	xo	xo	xxx							1.74	903	SB	1966	14
18	A	Carolin Schäfer	Germany	–	–	–	o	o	o	xxx								1.71	867		1929	18
18	A	Tori West	Australia	–	–	–	–	o	o	xxx								1.71	867		1900	20
20	A	Martha Araújo	Colombia	o	o	o	o	xo	o	xxx								1.71	867		1969	12
21	A	Auriana Lazraq-Khlass	France	–	–	–	o	o	xxx									1.68	830		1874	21
–	B	Chari Hawkins	United States	–	–	–	–	–	xxx									NM	0		1100	22
–	B	Sophie Weißenberg	Germany																	DNS		

=== Shot put ===
Rank	Group	Athlete	Nation	#1	#2	#3	Distance	Points	Notes	Overall	Overall rank
1	B	Nafissatou Thiam	Belgium	x	15.20	15.54	15.54	897	SB	3070	1
2	B	Anouk Vetter	Netherlands	13.88	14.04	15.07	15.07	866		2821	8
3	B	Noor Vidts	Belgium	14.34	14.23	14.57	14.57	832		2957	4
4	A	Emma Oosterwegel	Netherlands	13.28	14.54	14.46	14.54	830	PB	2796	10
5	A	Katarina Johnson-Thompson	Great Britain	13.38	12.65	14.44	14.44	823	PB	3020	2
6	B	Saga Vanninen	Finland	13.98	14.19	13.67	14.19	807		2744	18
7	A	Martha Araújo	Colombia	14.15	13.68	13.69	14.15	804	PB	2773	11
8	B	Anna Hall	United States	13.42	14.11	x	14.11	801		2965	3
9	B	Carolin Schäfer	Germany	13.80	13.88	14.02	14.02	795		2724	16
10	B	Annik Kälin	Switzerland	14.02	13.79	x	14.02	795		2842	6
11	A	Sofie Dokter	Netherlands	12.91	13.97	13.10	13.97	792	PB	2886	5
12	A	Adrianna Sułek-Schubert	Poland	13.94	x	x	13.94	790	SB	2808	9
13	A	Xénia Krizsán	Hungary	13.89	13.89	x	13.89	787		2762	13
14	B	Kate O'Connor	Ireland	13.79	13.30	13.32	13.79	780		2688	18
15	B	Auriana Lazraq-Khlass	France	13.69	x	x	13.69	773		2647	20
16	B	Rita Nemes	Hungary	13.64	13.27	13.33	13.64	770		2715	17
17	B	Chari Hawkins	United States	13.64	13.32	13.01	13.64	770		1100	22
18	B	Taliyah Brooks	United States	13.58	12.73	12.77	13.58	766		2831	7
19	A	Camryn Newton-Smith	Australia	12.44	13.11	12.53	13.11	735		2769	12
20	A	Jade O'Dowda	Great Britain	x	13.05	13.10	13.10	734		2758	14
21	A	Tori West	Australia	12.52	12.81	12.68	12.81	715		2615	21
22	A	Sveva Gerevini	Italy	12.80	12.20	11.98	12.80	714	PB	2682	19
–	A	Sophie Weißenberg	Germany	–	–	–	–	–	DNS		

=== 200 metres ===
Wind:
Heat 1: +0.2, Heat 2: +0.4, Heat 3: -0.5

Rank	Heat	Athlete	Nation	Time	Points	Notes	Overall	Overall rank
1	3	Katarina Johnson-Thompson	Great Britain	23.44	1035		4055	1
2	2	Sveva Gerevini	Italy	23.58	1021	PB	3703	13
3	3	Sofie Dokter	Netherlands	23.73	1007		3893	5
4	2	Carolin Schäfer	Germany	23.85	995	SB	3719	11
5	2	Noor Vidts	Belgium	23.86	994		3951	4
6	3	Auriana Lazraq-Khlass	France	23.87	993		3640	18
7	3	Annik Kälin	Switzerland	23.88	992		3834	6
8	2	Anna Hall	United States	23.89	991		3956	3
9	3	Taliyah Brooks	United States	24.02	979		3810	7
10	1	Adrianna Sułek-Schubert	Poland	24.20	962	SB	3770	8
11	2	Emma Oosterwegel	Netherlands	24.35	947	SB	3743	10
12	3	Anouk Vetter	Netherlands	24.36	946		3767	9
13	1	Nafissatou Thiam	Belgium	24.46	937	SB	4007	2
14	2	Martha Araújo	Colombia	24.46	937		3710	12
15	2	Chari Hawkins	United States	24.49	934		2804	22
16	3	Tori West	Australia	24.73	912		3527	21
17	1	Saga Vanninen	Finland	24.74	911	SB	3655	16
18	2	Camryn Newton-Smith	Australia	24.76	909		3678	14
19	1	Kate O'Connor	Ireland	24.77	908	SB	3596	19
20	1	Xénia Krizsán	Hungary	24.92	894	SB	3656	15
21	1	Jade O'Dowda	Great Britain	24.97	890		3648	17
22	1	Rita Nemes	Hungary	25.61	832		3547	20
–	3	Sophie Weißenberg	Germany	–	–	DNS		

=== Long jump ===
Rank	Group	Athlete	Nation	#1	#2	#3	Distance	Points	Notes	Overall	Overall rank
1	B	Martha Araújo	Colombia	6.21	6.25	6.61	6.61	1043	PB	4753	7
2	B	Annik Kälin	Switzerland	x	6.59	6.41	6.59	1036		4870	3
3	B	Nafissatou Thiam	Belgium	6.05	6.41	6.41	6.41	978		4985	2
4	B	Noor Vidts	Belgium	6.40	6.10	6.16	6.40	975		4926	4
5	B	Katarina Johnson-Thompson	Great Britain	4.65	6.04	6.40	6.40	975		5030	1
6	B	Jade O'Dowda	Great Britain	6.33	6.33	6.31	6.33	953		4601	11
7	A	Sofie Dokter	Netherlands	6.26	x	6.08	6.26	930		4823	6
8	A	Adrianna Sułek-Schubert	Poland	6.09	x	6.22	6.22	918	SB	4688	12
9	B	Taliyah Brooks	United States	5.72	x	6.15	6.15	896		4706	10
10	B	Anouk Vetter	Netherlands	6.12	6.10	6.12	6.12	887		4654	21
11	B	Sveva Gerevini	Italy	6.08	x	5.94	6.08	874		4577	15
12	A	Xénia Krizsán	Hungary	x	5.86	6.03	6.03	859		4515	9
13	A	Anna Hall	United States	5.93	5.80	5.72	5.93	828		4784	5
14	A	Chari Hawkins	United States	x	5.90	5.66	5.90	819		3623	22
15	A	Rita Nemes	Hungary	5.88	5.72	5.84	5.88	813		4360	19
16	B	Saga Vanninen	Finland	5.85	5.82	4.95	5.85	804		4459	13
17	A	Kate O'Connor	Ireland	5.67	5.75	5.79	5.79	786		4382	14
18	A	Camryn Newton-Smith	Australia	5.41	5.78	5.46	5.78	783		4461	16
19	A	Emma Oosterwegel	Netherlands	5.57	5.65	5.68	5.68	753		4496	8
20	B	Auriana Lazraq-Khlass	France	x	x	5.59	5.59	726		4366	18
21	A	Carolin Schäfer	Germany	5.52	x	5.52	5.52	706		4425	17
22	A	Tori West	Australia	5.41	5.39	5.25	5.41	674		4201	20
		Sophie Weißenberg	Germany	–	–	–	–		DNS		

=== Javelin throw ===
Rank	Group	Athlete	Nation	#1	#2	#3	Distance	Points	Notes	Overall	Overall rank
1	B	Nafissatou Thiam	Belgium	54.04	x	52.56	54.04	939	SB	5924	1
2	B	Emma Oosterwegel	Netherlands	51.78	48.97	52.39	52.39	906		5402	8
3	B	Kate O'Connor	Ireland	50.36	50.17	46.63	50.36	867		5249	14
4	A	Xénia Krizsán	Hungary	48.19	45.24	49.52	49.52	851	SB	5366	9
5	B	Tori West	Australia	48.79	x	41.83	48.79	837		5038	20
6	B	Annik Kälin	Switzerland	48.14	42.37	45.85	48.14	824	SB	5694	3
7	A	Saga Vanninen	Finland	46.81	47.00	46.00	47.00	802	SB	5261	13
8	B	Carolin Schäfer	Germany	46.45	46.32	45.75	46.45	791		5216	17
9	A	Anna Hall	United States	x	45.99	44.60	45.99	783	PB	5567	5
10	B	Martha Araújo	Colombia	x	40.66	45.67	45.67	776		5529	7
11	A	Katarina Johnson-Thompson	Great Britain	44.64	x	45.49	45.49	773	SB	5803	2
12	B	Auriana Lazraq-Khlass	France	43.61	43.25	45.37	45.37	771		5137	18
13	A	Noor Vidts	Belgium	43.54	43.83	45.00	45.00	763	PB	5689	4
14	A	Camryn Newton-Smith	Australia	38.95	44.77	44.02	44.77	759		5220	16
15	B	Chari Hawkins	United States	44.30	42.40	x	44.30	750		4373	21
16	A	Jade O'Dowda	Great Britain	44.05	43.38	41.94	44.05	745	SB	5346	11
17	A	Rita Nemes	Hungary	43.64	42.70	42.27	43.64	737		5097	19
18	B	Sofie Dokter	Netherlands	41.23	42.26	42.46	42.46	715		5538	6
19	A	Sveva Gerevini	Italy	37.74	39.68	36.30	39.68	661		5238	15
20	A	Taliyah Brooks	United States	37.84	38.76	38.22	38.76	644		5350	10
21	A	Adrianna Sułek-Schubert	Poland	35.60	x	36.63	36.63	603		5291	12
	B	Anouk Vetter	Netherlands	–	–	–	–		DNS	DNF	
		Sophie Weißenberg	Germany	–	–	–	–		DNS		

=== 800 metres ===
Rank	Heat	Athlete	Nation	Time	Points	Notes	Overall	Overall rank
1	2	Anna Hall	United States	2:04.39	1048	=SB	6615	5
2	2	Katarina Johnson-Thompson	Great Britain	2:04.90	1041	PB	6844	2
3	2	Xénia Krizsán	Hungary	2:06.27	1020	PB	6386	7
4	2	Noor Vidts	Belgium	2:06.38	1018	PB	6707	3
5	2	Emma Oosterwegel	Netherlands	2:08.67	984	PB	6386	7
6	1	Sveva Gerevini	Italy	2:08.84	982	PB	6220	13
7	1	Auriana Lazraq-Khlass	France	2:09.45	973	PB	6110	16
8	1	Rita Nemes	Hungary	2:10.10	963	PB	6060	18
9	2	Nafissatou Thiam	Belgium	2:10.62	956	PB	6880	1
10	2	Annik Kälin	Switzerland	2:11.33	945	PB	6639	4
11	1	Adrianna Sułek-Schubert	Poland	2:12.06	935	SB	6226	12
12	1	Jade O'Dowda	Great Britain	2:12.12	934		6280	10
13	1	Kate O'Connor	Ireland	2:13.25	918	SB	6167	14
14	2	Sofie Dokter	Netherlands	2:13.52	914		6452	6
15	2	Taliyah Brooks	United States	2:13.95	908		6258	11
16	1	Saga Vanninen	Finland	2:14.36	902	PB	6163	15
17	1	Chari Hawkins	United States	2:15.76	882		5255	21
18	1	Carolin Schäfer	Germany	2:16.78	868	SB	6084	17
19	2	Martha Araújo	Colombia	2:17.55	857	PB	6386	7
20	1	Tori West	Australia	2:20.97	810		5848	20
21	1	Camryn Newton-Smith	Australia	2:24.63	762		5982	19
		Anouk Vetter	Netherlands	–	–	DNS	DNF	
		Sophie Weißenberg	Germany	–	–	DNS		

== Overall results ==
Key

The highest mark recorded in each event is highlighted in yellow.

Key:	OR	Olympic record	AR	Area record	NR	National record	PB	Personal best	SB	Seasonal best	DNS	Did not start	DNF	Did not finish	NM	No Mark

Rank	Athlete	Nation	Overall points	100 h	HJ	SP	200 m	LJ	JT	800 m
1st place, gold medalist(s)	Nafissatou Thiam	Belgium	6880 (SB)	1041; 13.56 s	1132; 1.92 m	897; 15.54 m	937; 24.46 s	978; 6.41 m	939; 54.04 m	956; 2:10.62 s
2nd place, silver medalist(s)	Katarina Johnson-Thompson	Great Britain	6844 (SB)	1065; 13.40 s	1132; 1.92 m	823; 14.44 m	1035; 23.44 s	975; 6.40 m	773; 45.49 m	1041; 2:04.90 s
3rd place, bronze medalist(s)	Noor Vidts	Belgium	6707 (PB)	1109; 13.10 s	1016; 1.83 m	832; 14.57 m	994; 23.86 s	975; 6.40 m	763; 45.00 m	1018; 2:06.38 s
4	Annik Kälin	Switzerland	6639 (NR)	1144; 12.87 s	903; 1.74 m	795; 14.02 m	992; 23.88 s	1036; 6.59 m	824; 48.14 m	945; 2:11.33 s
5	Anna Hall	United States	6615 (SB)	1071; 13.36 s	1093; 1.89 m	801; 14.11 m	991; 23.89 s	828; 5.93 m	783; 45.99 m	1048; 2:04.39 s
6	Sofie Dokter	Netherlands	6452 (PB)	1040; 13.57 s	1054; 1.86 m	792; 13.97 m	1007; 23.73 s	930; 6.26 m	715; 42.46 m	914; 2:13.52 s
7	Martha Araújo	Colombia	6386 (AR)	1102; 13.15 s	867; 1.71 m	804; 14.15 m	937; 24.46 s	1043; 6.61 m	776; 45.67 m	857; 2:17.55 s
7	Emma Oosterwegel	Netherlands	6386 (SB)	1063; 13.41 s	903; 1.74 m	830; 14.54 m	947; 24.35 s	753; 5.68 m	906; 52.39 m	984; 2:08.67 s
7	Xénia Krizsán	Hungary	6386 (SB)	1034; 13.61 s	941; 1.77 m	787; 13.89 m	894; 24.92 s	859; 6.03 m	851; 49.52 m	1020; 2:06.27 s
10	Jade O'Dowda	Great Britain	6280	1046; 13.53 s	978; 1.80 m	734; 13.10 m	890; 24.97 s	953; 6.33 m	745; 44.05 m	934; 2:12.12 s
11	Taliyah Brooks	United States	6258	1124; 13.00 s	941; 1.77 m	766; 13.58 m	979; 24.02 s	896; 6.15 m	644; 38.76 m	908; 2:13.95 s
12	Adrianna Sułek-Schubert	Poland	6226 (SB)	1077; 13.32 s	941; 1.77 m	790; 13.94 m	962; 24.20 s	918; 6.22 m	603; 36.63 m	935; 2:12.06 s
13	Sveva Gerevini	Italy	6220	1065; 13.40 s	903; 1.74 m	714; 12.80 m	1021; 23.58 s	874; 6.08 m	661; 39.68 m	982; 2:08.84 s
14	Kate O'Connor	Ireland	6167	967; 14.08 s	941; 1.77 m	780; 13.79 m	908; 24.77 s	786; 5.79 m	867; 50.36 m	918; 2:13.25 s
15	Saga Vanninen	Finland	6163 (SB)	1034; 13.61 s	903; 1.74 m	807; 14.19 m	911; 24.74 s	804; 5.85 m	802; 47.00 m	902; 2:14.36 s
16	Auriana Lazraq-Khlass	France	6110	1044; 13.54 s	830; 1.68 m	773; 13.69 m	993; 23.87 s	726; 5.59 m	771; 45.37 m	973; 2:09.45 s
17	Carolin Schäfer	Germany	6084 (SB)	1062; 13.42 s	867; 1.71 m	795; 14.02 m	995; 23.85 s	706; 5.52 m	791; 46.45 m	868; 2:16.78 s
18	Rita Nemes	Hungary	6060	1004; 13.82 s	941; 1.77 m	770; 13.64 m	832; 25.61 s	813; 5.88 m	737; 43.64 m	963; 2:10.10 s
19	Camryn Newton-Smith	Australia	5982	1056; 13.46 s	978; 1.80 m	735; 13.11 m	909; 24.76 s	783; 5.78 m	759; 44.77 m	762; 2:24.63 s
20	Tori West	Australia	5848	1033; 13.62 s	867; 1.71 m	715; 12.81 m	912; 24.73 s	674; 5.41 m	837; 48.79 m	810; 2:20.97 s
21	Chari Hawkins	United States	5255	1100; 13.16 s	0 NM	770; 13.64 m	934; 24.49 s	819; 5.90 m	750; 44.30 m	882; 2:15.76 s
–	Anouk Vetter*	Netherlands	4654* (DNF)	1052; 13.49 s	903; 1.74 m	866; 15.07 m	946; 24.36 s	887; 6.12 m	DNS	DNS
–	Sophie Weißenberg**	Germany	DNS	DNS	DNS	DNS	DNS	DNS	DNS	DNS

* – Anouk Vetter retired after long jump and did not participate in the remaining events.
** – Sophie Weißenberg was injured in the warmups before the 100 metres hurdles and did not participate in any events.
