= Adriana Rodríguez =

Cuban athletics competitor

Personal information
- Full name: Adriana Rodríguez Fuentes
- Born: 12 July 1999 (age 26)

Sport
- Sport: Athletics
- Event(s): Heptathlon, long jump
Medal record
Representing Cuba
Pan American Games
Gold medal – first place	2019 Lima	Heptathlon
World U20 Championships
Silver medal – second place	2016 Bydgoszcz	Heptathlon
World Youth Championships
Silver medal – second place	2015 Cali	Heptathlon

Adriana Rodríguez Fuentes (Note: In this Spanish name, the first or paternal surname is Rodríguez and the second or maternal family name is Fuentes.) (born 12 July 1999) is a Cuban athlete competing in the heptathlon and long jump. She represented her country in the latter at the 2019 World Championships in Doha without reaching the final. Earlier that year she won a heptathlon gold at the 2019 Pan American Games.

== International competitions ==
Year	Competition	Venue	Position	Event	Notes
Representing Cuba
2015	World Youth Championships	Cali, Colombia	2nd	Heptathlon (youth)	5720 pts
2016	World U20 Championships	Bydgoszcz, Poland	2nd	Heptathlon	5925 pts
2017	Pan American U20 Championships	Trujillo, Peru	1st	Heptathlon	5733 pts
2018	World U20 Championships	Tampere, Finland	4th	Heptathlon	5910 pts
2018	Central American and Caribbean Games	Barranquilla, Colombia	6th	200 m	23.63 s
2018	Central American and Caribbean Games	Barranquilla, Colombia	5th	4 × 100 m relay	44.44 s
2019	Pan American Games	Lima, Peru	6th	Long jump	6.49 m
2019	Pan American Games	Lima, Peru	1st	Heptathlon	6113 pts
2019	World Championships	Doha, Qatar	13th (h)	4 × 400 m relay	3:29.84 min
2019	World Championships	Doha, Qatar	25th (q)	Long jump	6.39 m
2022	Ibero-American Championships	La Nucía, Spain	–	Long jump	NM
2023	Central American and Caribbean Games	San Salvador, El Salvador	5th	Long jump	6.38 m
2023	Central American and Caribbean Games	San Salvador, El Salvador	–	Heptathlon	DNF

== Personal bests ==
Outdoors

- 100 metres – 11.39 (+0.4 m/s, Camagüey 2018)
- 200 metres – 23.63 (+0.6 m/s, Barranquilla 2018)
- 400 metres – 54.14 (Havana 2019)
- 800 metres – 2:18.49 (Lima 2019)
- 100 metres hurdles – 13.32 (+0.1 m/s, Havana 2019)
- High jump – 1.80 (Bydgoszcz 2016)
- Long jump – 6.70 (-0.8 m/s, Cáceres 2019)
- Shot put – 13.29 (Götzis 2018)
- Javelin throw – 37.36 (Bydgoszcz 2016)
- Heptathlon – 6113 (Lima 2019)
