= Adrianna Sułek-Schubert =

Polish heptathlete (born 1999)

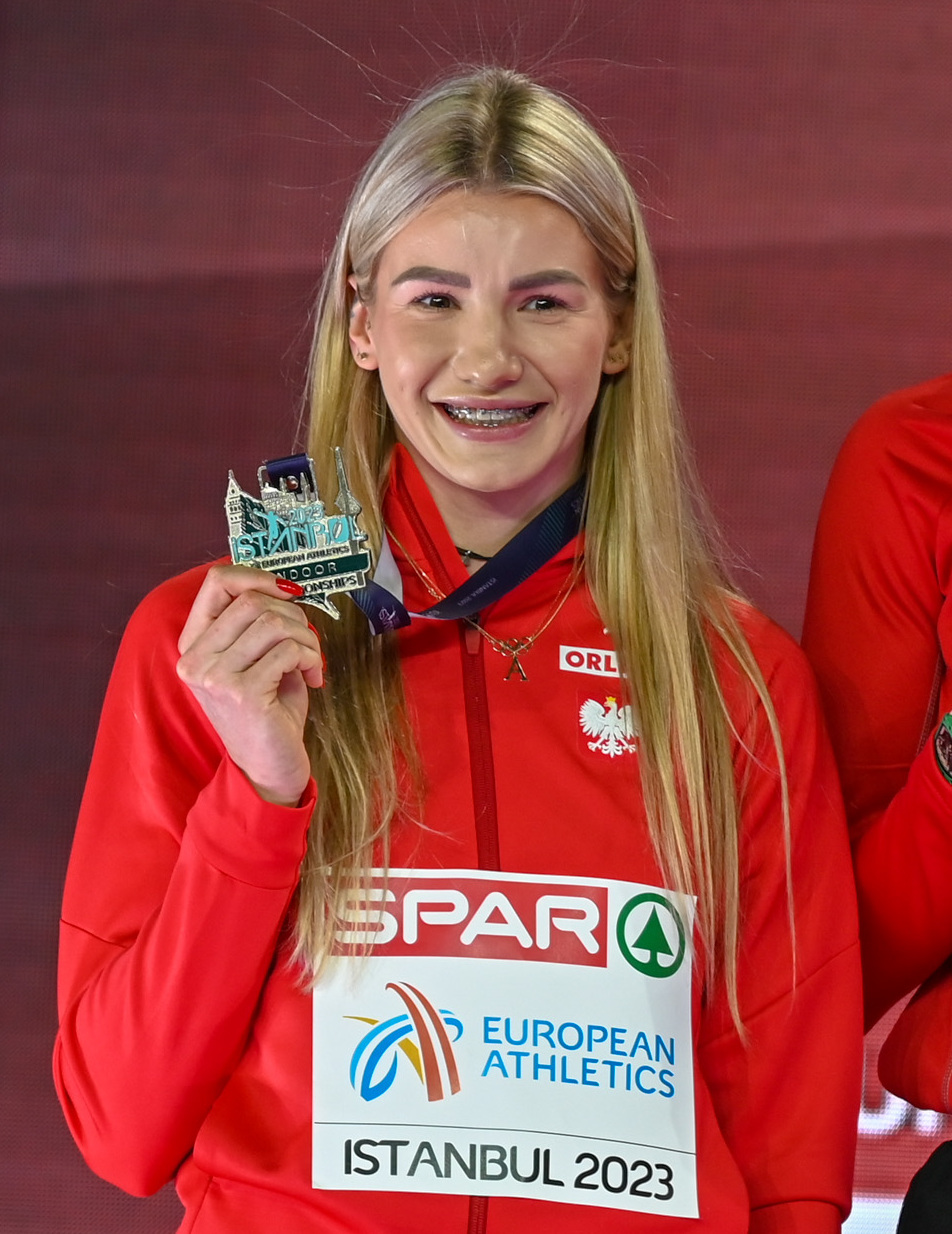
- Sułek at the 2023 European Indoor Championships in Istanbul

Personal information
- Born: 3 April 1999 (age 27) Bydgoszcz, Poland
- Height: 1.72 m (5 ft 8 in)

Sport
- Country: Poland
- Sport: Athletics
- Events: Heptathlon, pentathlon
- Club: Brda Bydgoszcz
- Coached by: Marek Rzepka (2022–); Marek Kubiszewski (2021); Wiesław Czapiewski (–2019)

Achievements and titles
- Personal bests: Heptathlon: 6672 NR (Eugene 2022); Indoors; Pentathlon: 5014 NR (Istanbul 2023)
Medal record
Women's athletics
Representing Poland
World Indoor Championships
Silver medal – second place	2022 Belgrade	Pentathlon
European Championships
Silver medal – second place	2022 Munich	Heptathlon
European Indoor Championships
Silver medal – second place	2023 Istanbul	Pentathlon
European U23 Championships
Gold medal – first place	2021 Tallinn	Heptathlon
World U20 Championships
Bronze medal – third place	2018 Tampere	Heptathlon

Adrianna Sułek-Schubert (pronounced: [adrˈjan.na ˈsu.wɛk]; born 3 April 1999) is a Polish athlete competing in the combined events. She won the silver medal in the pentathlon at the 2022 World Indoor Championships. Sułek placed fourth in the heptathlon at the 2022 World Championships, and won the silver medal at the 2022 European Championships and 2023 European Indoor Championships. She is also a two-time Olympian and competed at the 2020 and 2024 Summer Olympics.

Sułek was the heptathlon 2018 World Under-20 Championships bronze medallist and the 2021 European U23 champion. She is the Polish record holder for both the heptathlon and pentathlon, and has won seven individual national titles.

== Early life and background ==
Adrianna Sułek was brought up by her mother, a Polish philologist, in Ostromecko near Bydgoszcz. She started out playing volleyball and competed in 2014 as a middle attacker at Pałac Bydgoszcz club. After she had been given an ultimatum to play as a libero because of her height, she switched to track and field, competing for Zawisza Bydgoszcz and coached by Wiesław Czapiewski who died in 2019.

Sułek graduated from XI Sports High School in Bydgoszcz and, as of 2022, was a student of Journalism and Social Communication at Maria Curie-Skłodowska University in Lublin.

== Career ==
=== 2016–2022 ===
Sułek made her international debut in 2016, finishing 14th in the heptathlon at the European Under-18 Championships held in Tbilisi, Georgia.

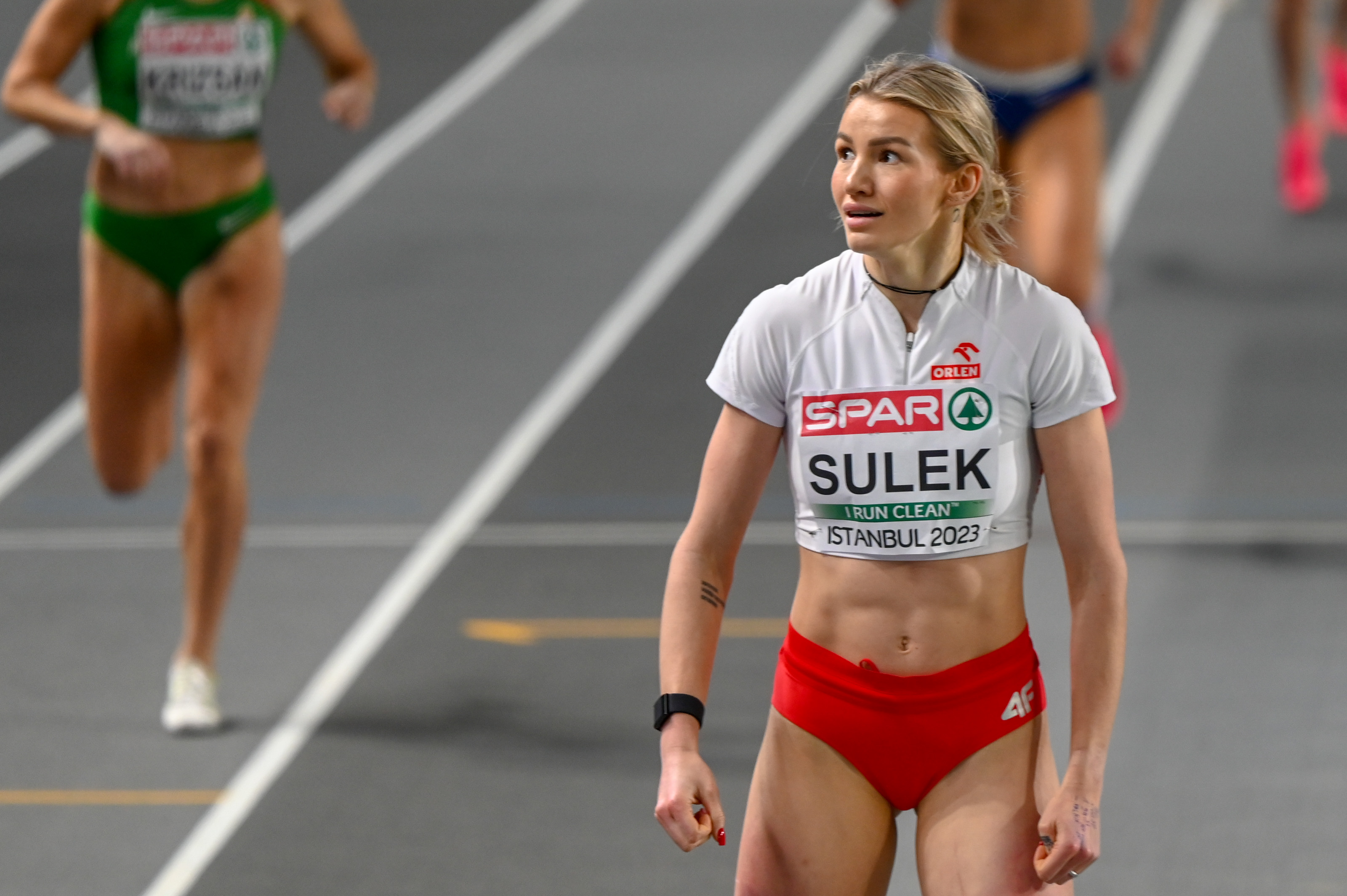
Sułek won the 800 m run, becoming the pentathlon world record holder for a short while at Istanbul 2023.

After her bronze in the event at the 2018 World Under-20 Championships and European U23 gold in 2021, she had a breakthrough 2022 season. At the World Indoor Championships in Belgrade in March, the 22-year-old won the silver medal in the pentathlon, breaking Urszula Włodarczyk's 24-year-old Polish national record by 43 points with her score of 4851 points. In July, she placed fourth in the heptathlon at the World Championships held in Eugene, Oregon, totalling 6672 points and beating Małgorzata Nowak's Polish record dating back to 1985 by 56 pts. She wrapped up her long season the following month by taking silver at the Munich European Championships, where she lost injured (biceps femoris problems) only to two-time Olympic champion Nafissatou Thiam. Sułek set in this competition personal bests in three disciplines. She achieved altogether four heptathlons over 6400 points that year to secure her first overall World Combined Events Tour victory, becoming only the second Polish athlete after Włodarczyk in 1998 to do so.

=== 2023–present ===
In March 2023, Sułek broke for the first time the pentathlon 5000-point barrier to set her second Polish record that year in the event. She established personal bests in four events and scored 5014 pts at the European Indoor Championships held in Istanbul, Turkey, beating the world record set in 2012 in the same Ataköy Arena by Ukraine's Nataliya Dobrynska (5013 pts). Finishing first the 800 m run, the final of the five events in pentathlon, Sułek held the new world record for about six seconds only and had to settle for silver, however, as Thiam set even better mark of 5055 pts.

== Personal life ==
She is married to a former Polish hurdler, Kacper Schubert. In February 2024 she gave birth to their first child.

== Achievements ==
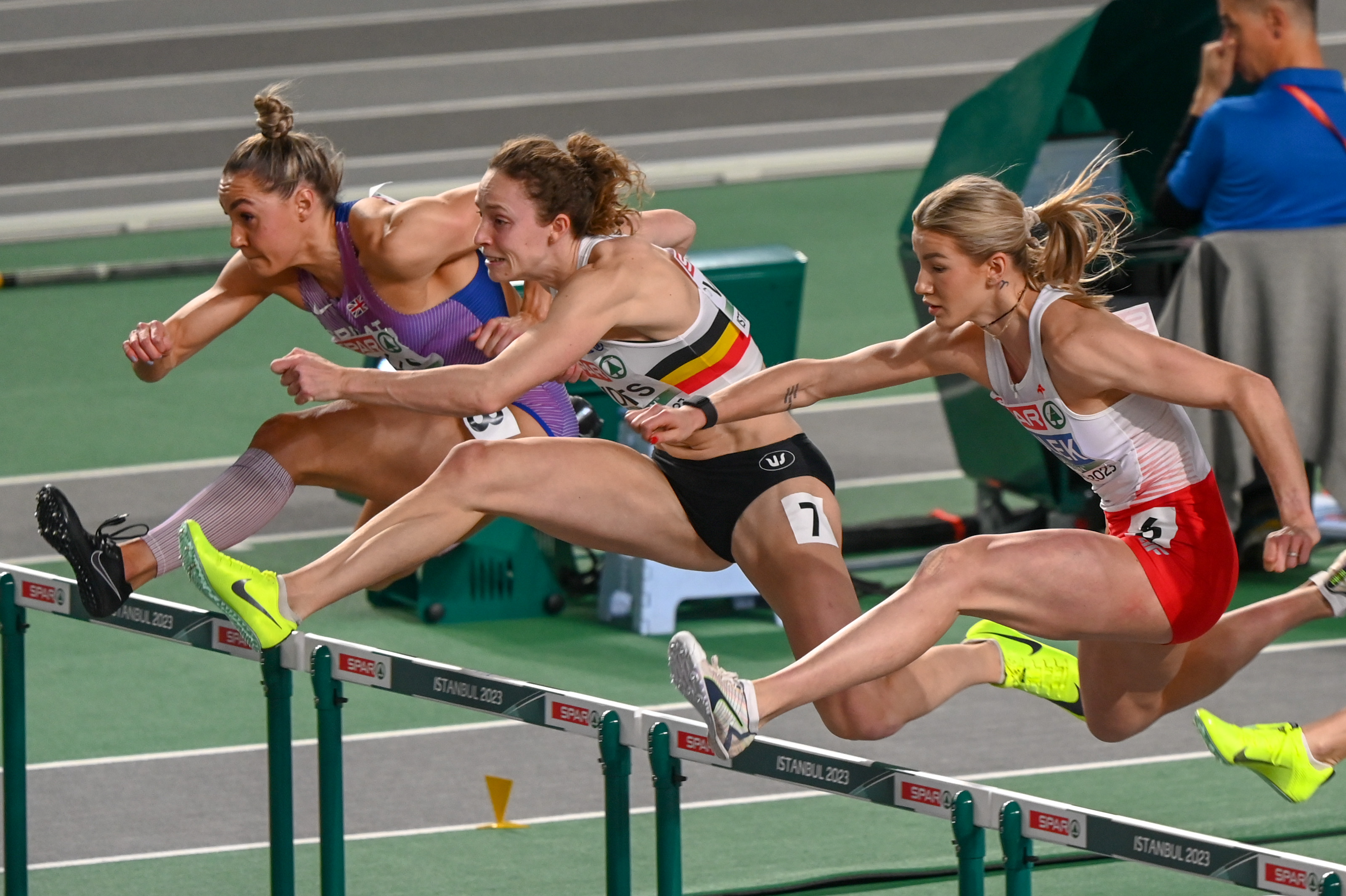
Adrianna Sułek (R) hurdles at the 2023 European Indoor Championships in Istanbul.

=== International competitions ===
Representing Poland
Year	Competition	Venue	Position	Event	Result
2016	European U18 Championships	Tbilisi, Georgia	14th	Heptathlon	5282 pts
2017	European U20 Championships	Grosseto, Italy	7th	Heptathlon	5784 pts
2018	World U20 Championships	Tampere, Finland	3rd	Heptathlon	5939 pts
2019	European U23 Championships	Gävle, Sweden	6th	Heptathlon	5954 pts
2021	European Indoor Championships	Toruń, Poland	9th	Pentathlon	4231 pts
2021	European U23 Championships	Tallinn, Estonia	1st	Heptathlon	6305 pts
2021	Olympic Games	Tokyo, Japan	16th	Heptathlon	6164 pts
2022	World Indoor Championships	Belgrade, Serbia	2nd	Pentathlon	4851 pts NR
2022	World Championships	Eugene, OR, United States	4th	Heptathlon	6672 pts NR
2022	European Championships	Munich, Germany	2nd	Heptathlon	6532 pts
2023	European Indoor Championships	Istanbul, Turkey	2nd	Pentathlon	5014 pts NR
2024	Olympic Games	Paris, France	12th	Heptathlon	6226 pts
2025	World Championships	Tokyo, Japan	15th	Heptathlon	6105 pts
2026	World Indoor Championships	Toruń, Poland	4th	Pentathlon	4638 pts
2026	European Championships	Birmingham, United Kingdom	7th	Heptathlon	6375 pts

=== Personal bests ===
Outdoor
Event	Performance	Points	Venue	Date	Notes
100 m hurdles	13.08 s	1112	Warsaw, Poland	18 June 2022	
High jump	1.92 m	1132	Götzis, Austria	28 May 2022	
Shot put	14.44 m	823	Götzis, Austria	27 May 2023	
200 metres	23.77 s	1003	Eugene, OR, United States	17 July 2022	
Long jump	6.55 m	1023	Munich, Germany	18 August 2022	
Javelin throw	42.86 m	722	Munich, Germany	18 August 2022	
800 metres	2:07.18	1006	Eugene, OR, United States	18 July 2022	
Heptathlon	6672 pts	PB total: 6821	Eugene, OR, United States	18 July 2022	NR

Indoor
Event	Performance	Points	Venue	Date	Notes
60 m hurdles	8.21 s	1082	Istanbul, Turkey	3 March 2023	
High jump	1.89 m	1093	Toruń, Poland	5 March 2022	
Shot put	14.89 m	854	Toruń, Poland	22 March 2026	
Long jump	6.62 m	1046	Istanbul, Turkey	3 March 2023	
800 metres	2:07.17	1006	Istanbul, Turkey	3 March 2023	
Pentathlon	5014 pts	PB total: 5014	Istanbul, Turkey	3 March 2023	NR, 2nd of all time
Pentathlon U20	4385 pts		Toruń, Poland	17 February 2018	NU20R

=== Circuit wins and titles, National titles ===
- World Athletics Combined Events Tour Overall winner: 2022
  - 2022: Wiesław Czapiewski Memorial
- Polish Athletics Championships
  - Heptathlon: 2019, 2021, 2022
  - 4 × 100 m relay: 2019
- Polish Indoor Athletics Championships
  - Pentathlon: 2018, 2019, 2022, 2023
