= Sarah Lagger =

Austrian heptathlete

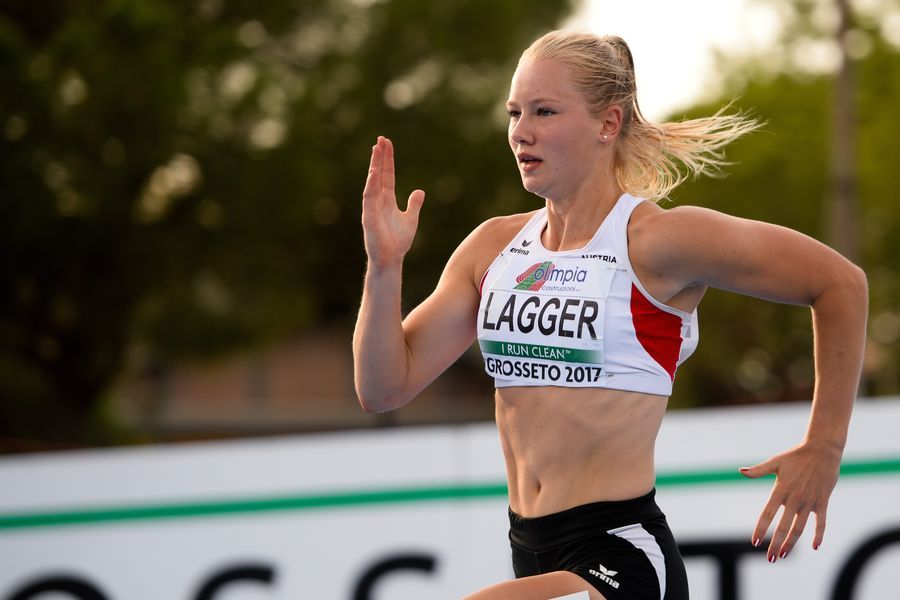
- Sarah Lagger in 2017

Personal information
- Born: 3 September 1999 (age 26) Spittal an der Drau, Austria
- Height: 1.75 m (5 ft 9 in)
- Weight: 60 kg (132 lb)

Sport
- Sport: Athletics
- Event: Heptathlon
- Club: TGW Zehnkampf-Union
- Coached by: Georg Werthner

Sarah Lagger (born 3 September 1999 in Spittal an der Drau) is an Austrian track and field athlete competing in the combined events. As a junior she won a gold medal in the heptathlon at the 2016 World U20 Championships and a silver at the 2018 edition.

== International competitions ==
Year	Competition	Venue	Position	Event	Notes
Representing Austria
2015	World Youth Championships	Cali, Colombia	2nd	Heptathlon (youth)	5992 pts
2016	European Youth Championships	Tbilisi, Georgia	2nd	Heptathlon (youth)	6175 pts
2016	World U20 Championships	Bydgoszcz, Poland	1st	Heptathlon	5960 pts
2017	European U20 Championships	Grosseto, Italy	13th (q)	Long jump	6.17 m
2017	European U20 Championships	Grosseto, Italy	3rd	Heptathlon	6083 pts
2018	World U20 Championships	Tampere, Finland	2nd	Heptathlon	6225 pts
2018	European Championships	Berlin, Germany	13th	Heptathlon	6058 pts
2019	European U23 Championships	Gävle, Sweden	5th	Heptathlon	6026 pts
2021	European U23 Championships	Tallinn, Estonia	4th	Heptathlon	6040 pts
2022	World Indoor Championships	Belgrade, Serbia	8th	Pentathlon	4391 pts
2023	World Championships	Budapest, Hungary	17th	Heptathlon	5910 pts

== Personal bests ==
Outdoor

- 200 metres – 24.53 (-0.5 m/s, Cali 2015)
- 800 metres – 2:11.53 (Tampere 2018)
- 100 metres hurdles – 13.98 (+0.9 m/s, Linz 2017)
- High jump – 1.79 (Wels 2015)
- Long jump – 6.31 (+0.6 m/s, Kapfenberg 2015)
- Shot put – 15.23 (Gävle 2019)
- Javelin throw – 50.32 (Eisenstadt 2020)
- Heptathlon – 6225 (Tampere 2018)

Indoor

- 60 metres – 7.81 (Linz 2017)
- 800 metres – 2:14.05 (Vienna 2018)
- 60 metres hurdles – 8.50 (Linz 2018)
- High jump – 1.77 (Linz 2018)
- Long jump – 6.18 (Vienna 2019)
- Shot put – 14.98 (Linz 2020)
- Pentathlon – 4372 (Linz 2019)
