= Holly Mills =

British long jumper and heptathlete (born 2000)

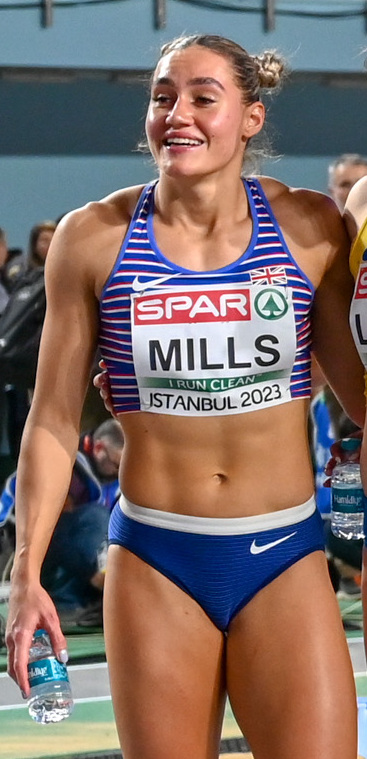
- Holly Mills in 2023

Personal information
- Nationality: England
- Born: 15 April 2000 (age 26)

Sport
- Country: Great Britain
- Club: Andover Athletics Club
Medal record
Women's athletics
Representing Great Britain
European U23 Championships
Bronze medal – third place	2021 Tallinn	Heptathlon
European U20 Championships
Bronze medal – third place	2019 Borås	Long jump
European U18 Championships
Gold medal – first place	2016 Tbilisi	Long jump
Representing England
Commonwealth Youth Games
Gold medal – first place	2017 Nassau	Long jump

Holly Mills (born 15 April 2000) is an English sportswoman. Originally a long jumper and heptathlete, she finished fourth both in the pentathlon at the 2022 World Indoor Championships and in the heptathlon at the 2022 Commonwealth Games. Mills won bronze medals for the heptathlon at the 2021 European Under-23 Championships and for the long jump at the 2019 European U20 Championships.

She was the long jump 2016 European U18 and 2017 Commonwealth Youth Games champion. In 2020, she won the British national pentathlon title.

Following a series of major injuries, including a ruptured Achilles tendon, hindered her competitive capabilities, Mills retired from track and field athletics, and transitioned to endurance triathlon, including Ironman distance events.

== Statistics ==
=== Personal bests ===
- Heptathlon – 6260 pts (Götzis 2022)
  - 100 metres hurdles – 13.21 (-1.1 m/s, Lana 2021)
  - 200 metres – 24.13 (+1.7 m/s, Mannheim 2019)
  - 800 metres – 2:08.07 (Götzis 2022)
  - High jump – 1.85 (Arona 2021)
  - Long jump – 6.51 (+0.6 m/s, Mannheim 2019)
  - Shot put – 13.78 (London 2021)
  - Javelin throw – 39.07 (Götzis 2022)

Indoors

- Pentathlon – 4673 pts (Belgrade 2022)
  - 60 metres hurdles – 8.15 (Belgrade 2022)
  - 800 metres – 2:09.97 (Belgrade 2022)
  - High jump – 1.77 (Istanbul 2023)
  - Long jump – 6.37 (Tallinn 2022)
  - Shot put – 14.03 (Manchester 2021)
  - Long jump – 5.85m (European Indoor Championships 2023)

=== National titles ===
- British Indoor Athletics Championships
  - Pentathlon: 2020
