= Bianca Salming =

Swedish heptathlete (born 1998)

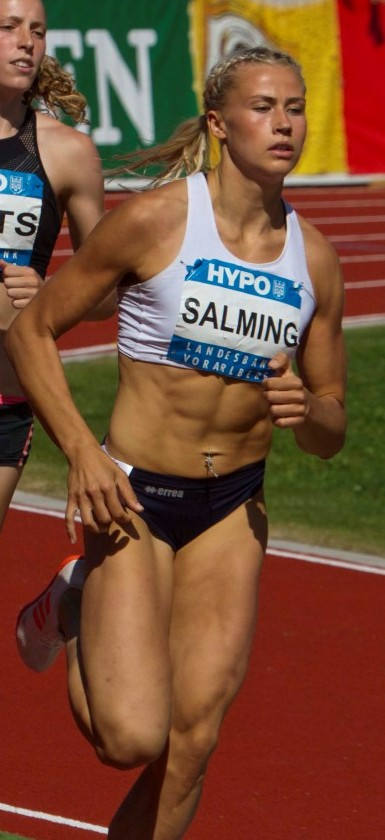
- Bianca Salming running in the 800 meters event at the Hypo-Meeting in Götzis, Austria in May 2017

Personal information
- Born: 22 November 1998 (age 26)

Sport
- Country: Sweden
- Sport: heptathlon
- Team: Turebergs FK

Bianca Emmelie Elisabeth Salming (born 22 November 1998) is a Swedish athlete who competes in heptathlon. She has won several Swedish Championship gold as a youth. She has competed for Täby IS. Since 2017 she competes for Turebergs FK. She also competes in long jump.

== Career ==
She placed fourth in heptathlon at the Junior World Championship in 2016.

She competed for Sweden in the 2018 European Athletics Championships in Berlin, and in the 2022 European Athletics Championships in Munich where she got 8th position in heptathlon.

== Personal life ==
Salming grew up in Vaxholm and currently resides in Stockholm. She is the daughter of late ice hockey player Börje Salming.
