= 2014 IAAF Combined Events Challenge =

The 2014 IAAF Combined Events Challenge was a series of combined events for decathletes and heptathletes consisting of five stand alone challenge events, a series of continental combined events championships, and the combined events portions of a series of international athletics championships and multi-sports games. The challenge is organised under the auspices of the world governing body of athletics, the International Association of Athletics Federations (IAAF).

Elite level competitors were crowned champions based on the aggregate points scored in three of the events. The total prize money available is US$202,000, split evenly between male and female athletes. The male and female winners each receive $30,000, while second and third placed athletes are entitled to $20,000 and $15,000 respectively. Smaller prizes are given to the rest of the top eight finishers.

== Calendar ==
The 2014 challenge takes in five challenge events, a number of regional combined events championships, and the combined events portions of a series of regional and international athletics championships.

Date	Event	Location	Status
3–4 April	Oceania Combined Events Championships	(Australia) Melbourne	Continental championships
2–3 May	Multistars	(Italy) Florence	Challenge event
31 May-1 June	40th Hypo-Meeting	(Austria) Götzis	Challenge event
14–15 June	TNT – Fortuna Meeting	(Czech Republic) Kladno	Challenge event
26–29 June	United States Championships	(United States) Sacramento	National championships
28–29 June	Erdgas Mehrkampf-Meeting	(Germany) Ratingen	Challenge event
5–6 July	European Cup Combined Events	(Ukraine) Donetsk (Poland) Toruń	Continental championships
17–18 July	Pan American Combined Events Cup	(Canada) Ottawa	Continental championships
27 July – 2 August	Commonwealth Games	(Scotland) Glasgow	International games
12–14 August	African Athletics Championships	(Morocco) Marrakesh	Continental championships
12–17 August	European Athletics Championships	(Switzerland) Zurich	Continental championships
20-21 September	Décastar	(France) Talence	Challenge event
26 September – 3 October	Asian Games	(Switzerland) Zurich	Continental games

== Results ==
=== Medal summary ===
==== Men ====
Event	Gold	Silver	Bronze
(Australia) Melbourne	Jake Stein (AUS)	Stephen Cain (AUS)	Kyle Cranston (AUS)
(Italy) Florence	Eelco Sintnicolaas (NED)	Ashley Bryant (GBR)	Pieter Braun (NED)
(Austria) Götzis	Trey Hardee (USA)	Kai Kazmirek (GER)	Rico Freimuth (GER)
(Czech Republic) Kladno	Oleksiy Kasyanov (UKR)	Adam Helcelet (CZE)	Eduard Mikhan (BLR)
(United States) Sacramento	Trey Hardee (USA)	Wesley Bray (USA)	Thomas Fitzsimons (USA)
(Germany) Ratingen	Rico Freimuth (GER)	Kévin Mayer (FRA)	Arthur Abele (GER)
(Poland) Toruń	Eelco Sintnicolaas (NED)	Eduard Mikhan (BLR)	Ingmar Vos (NED)
(Portugal) Ribeira Brava	Adam Helcelet (CZE)	Jiří Sýkora (CZE)	Fabian Rosenquist (SWE)
(Portugal) Ribeira Brava	Niels Pittomvils (BEL)	Ionel Irinel Cojan (ROU)	Michael Bowler (IRL)
(Canada) Ottawa	Yordani García (CUB)	José Angel Mendieta (CUB)	James Turner (CAN)
(United Kingdom) Glasgow	Damian Warner (CAN)	Ashley Bryant (GBR)	Kurt Felix (GRN)
(Morocco) Marrakesh	Larbi Bourrada (ALG)	Guillaume Thierry (MRI)	Atsu Nyamadi (GHA)
(Switzerland) Zurich	Andrei Krauchanka (BLR)	Kevin Mayer (FRA)	Ilya Shkurenyov (RUS)
(France) Talence	Mikk Pahapill (EST)	Oleksiy Kasyanov (UKR)	Yordani García (CUB)
(South Korea) Incheon	Keisuke Ushiro (JPN)	Leonid Andreev (UZB)	Akihiko Nakamura (JPN)

==== Women ====
Event	Gold	Silver	Bronze
(Australia) Melbourne	Sophie Stanwell (AUS)	Portia Bing (NZL)	Ashleigh Hamilton (AUS)
(Italy) Florence	Morgan Lake (GBR)	Katsiaryna Netsviatayeva (BLR)	Jessica Zelinka (CAN)
(Austria) Götzis	Katarina Johnson-Thompson (GBR)	Brianne Theisen Eaton (CAN)	Dafne Schippers (NED)
(Czech Republic) Kladno	Eliška Klučinová (CZE)	Katsiaryna Netsviatayeva (BLR)	Lucia Mokrášová (SVK)
(United States) Sacramento	Sharon Day-Monroe (USA)	Barbara Nwaba (USA)	Erica Bougard (USA)
(Germany) Ratingen	Lilli Schwarzkopf (GER)	Claudia Rath (GER)	Karolina Tymińska (POL)
(Poland) Toruń	Nadine Broersen (NED)	Antoinette Nana Djimou (FRA)	Yana Maksimava (BLR)
(Portugal) Ribeira Brava	Eliška Klučinová (CZE)	Alina Fyodorova (UKR)	Anastasiya Mokhnyuk (UKR)
(Portugal) Ribeira Brava	Sofia Yfantidou (GRE)	Lucia Mokrášová (SVK)	Sveinbjörg Zophoníasdóttir (ISL)
(Canada) Ottawa	Jillian Drouin (CAN)	Natasha Jackson (CAN)	Lindsay Schwartz (USA)
(United Kingdom) Glasgow	Brianne Theisen-Eaton (CAN)	Jessica Zelinka (CAN)	Jessica Taylor (GBR)
(Morocco) Marrakesh	Marthe Koala (BUR)	Elizabeth Dadzie (GHA)	Biance Erwee (RSA)
(Switzerland) Zurich	Antoinette Nana Djimou (FRA)	Nadine Broersen (NED)	Nafissatou Thiam (BEL)
(France) Talence	Carolin Schäfer (GER)	Anastasiya Mokhnyuk (UKR)	Yana Maksimava (BLR)
(Japan) Incheon	Ekaterina Voronina (UZB)	Wang Qingling (CHN)	Yuliya Tarasova (UZB)

== Overall ==
These are the overall rankings for all athletes who participated in three or more events.

=== Men ===
Rank	Athlete	Points
1st place, gold medalist(s)	Hans Van Alphen (BEL)	25259
2nd place, silver medalist(s)	Pascal Behrenbruch (GER)	25117
3rd place, bronze medalist(s)	Oleksiy Kasyanov (UKR)	24822
4	Eelco Sintnicolaas (NED)	24481
5	Dmitry Karpov (KAZ)	24271
6	Adam Helcelet (CZE)	24106
7	Yordanis Garcia (CUB)	24022
8	Ashley Bryant (GBR)	23194
9	Einar Daði Lárusson (ISL)	23141
10	Ali Kamé (MAD)	22080
11	Guillaume Thierry (MRI)	21593

=== Women ===
Rank	Athlete	Points
1st place, gold medalist(s)	Nadine Broersen (NED)	19717
2nd place, silver medalist(s)	Antoinette Nana Djimou (FRA)	19510
3rd place, bronze medalist(s)	Austra Skujytė (LTU)	19408
4	Laura Ikauniece-Admidiņa (LAT)	19031
5	Jessica Samuelsson (SWE)	18790
6	Sharon Day-Monroe (USA)	18731
7	Eliška Klučinová (CZE)	18543
8	Katarina Johnson-Thompson (GBR)	18522
9	Yana Maksimava (BLR)	18341
10	Györgyi Zsivoczky-Farkas (HUN)	17917
11	Ida Marcussen (NOR)	17795
12	Julia Machtig (GER)	17793
13	Marisa De Aniceto (FRA)	16335
