= 2019 IAAF Combined Events Challenge =

- Edition: 22nd
- Dates: 27 April–4 October
- Meetings: 11

The 2019 IAAF Combined Events Challenge was the 22nd edition of the global series of combined track and field event meetings organised by the International Association of Athletics Federations (IAAF). It featured decathlon for men and heptathlon for women. A total of eleven meetings were in the 2019 series, starting at the Multistars meet on 27 April and finishing at the 2019 World Athletics Championships on 4 October.

Athletes scored points based on their performances at meetings in the series, with the overall winners being the athletes with the highest aggregate score over three meetings. The total prize money was US$202,000, split evenly between male and female athletes. The male and female winners each received $30,000, while second and third placed athletes were entitled to $20,000 and $15,000 respectively. Smaller prizes were given to the rest of the top eight finishers. The overall winners were Damian Warner of Canada with 25,753 points in the decathlon and Austrian Verena Preiner with 19,623 points in the heptathlon.

== Calendar ==
The 2019 challenge included eleven meetings, covering invitational meetings, as well as national, regional and international championships and games.

Date	Event	Location	Country	Type	Results	Ref.
27–28 April	Multistars	Lana	Italy	Invitational	Results	
25–26 May	Hypo-Meeting	Götzis	Austria	Invitational	Results	
8–9 June	Meeting Internacional Arona	Arona	Spain	Invitational	Results	
22–23 June	Décastar	Talence	France	Invitational	Results	
29–30 June	Mehrkampf-Meeting Ratingen	Ratingen	Germany	Invitational	Results	
5–7 July	European Combined Events Team Championships (Super League, 1st League, and 2nd League)	Ribeira Brava/Lutsk	Portugal/Ukraine	Continental championships	Results	
25–28 July	USA Championships	Des Moines	United States	National championships	Results	
6–8 August	Pan American Games	Lima	Peru	Continental games	Decathlon/Heptathlon	
2–4 October	World Championships	Doha	Qatar	World championships	Decathlon/Heptathlon	

== Results ==
=== Men ===
Meet	First		Second		Third	
Multistars	Jan Doležal (CZE)	8117	Kristjan Rosenberg (EST)	7950	Mathias Brugger (GER)	7927
Hypo-Meeting	Damian Warner (CAN)	8711	Lindon Victor (GRN)	8473	Maicel Uibo (EST)	8353
Meeting Arona	Martin Roe (NOR)	8037	Kristjan Rosenberg (EST)	7878	Risto Lillemets (EST)	7853
Décastar	Pierce LePage (CAN)	8453	Zach Ziemek (USA)	8344	Thomas van der Plaetsen (BEL)	8214
Mehrkampf-Meeting Ratingen	Kai Kazmirek (GER)	8444	Basile Rolnin (FRA)	8205	Fredriech Pretorius (RSA)	7872
ECETC Super League	Vital Zhuk (BLR)	8237	Maicel Uibo (EST)	8181	Jorge Ureña (ESP)	8073
ECETC 1st League	Jiří Sýkora (CZE)	8104	Jan Doležal (CZE)	8083	Fredrik Samuelsson (SWE)	7925
ECETC 2nd League	Niels Pittomvils (BEL)	7837	Michael Bowler (IRL)	7379	Sander Maes (BEL)	7303
USA Championships	Devon Williams (USA)	8295	Solomon Simmons (USA)	8227	Harrison Williams (USA)	8188
Pan American Games	Damian Warner (CAN)	8513	Lindon Victor (GRN)	8240	Pierce LePage (CAN)	8161
World Championships	Niklas Kaul (GER)	8691	Maicel Uibo (EST)	8604	Damian Warner (CAN)	8529

=== Women ===
Meet	First		Second		Third	
Multistars	Annie Kunz (USA)	5971	Kate O'Connor (IRL)	5881	Riley Cooks (USA)	5873
Hypo-Meeting	Katarina Johnson-Thompson (GBR)	6813	Laura Ikauniece-Admidiņa (LAT)	6476	Xénia Krizsán (HUN)	6469
Meeting Arona	Verena Preiner (AUT)	6472	Noor Vidts (NED)	6194	Vanessa Chefer Spínola (BRA)	5955
Décastar	Nafissatou Thiam (BEL)	6819	Xénia Krizsán (HUN)	6619	Laura Ikauniece-Admidiņa (LAT)	6518
Mehrkampf-Meeting Ratingen	Verena Preiner (AUT)	6591	Ivona Dadic (AUT)	6461	Nadine Broersen (NED)	6232
ECETC Super League	Daryna Sloboda (UKR)	6165	Katie Stainton (GBR)	6029	Marijke Esselink (NED)	5905
ECETC 1st League	Kateřina Cachová (CZE)	6034	Jutta Heikkinen (FIN)	5795	Paulina Ligarska (POL)	5589
ECETC 2nd League	Noor Vidts (NED)	6027	Lucia Vadlejch (SVK)	5755	Maria Run Gunnlaugsdóttir (ISL)	5562
USA Championships	Erica Bougard (USA)	6663	Kendell Williams (USA)	6610	Chari Hawkins (USA)	6 230
Pan American Games	Adriana Rodríguez (CUB)	6113	Annie Kunz (USA)	5990	Martha Araújo (COL)	5925
World Championships	Katarina Johnson-Thompson (GBR)	6981	Nafissatou Thiam (BEL)	6677	Verena Preiner (AUT)	6560

== Points rankings ==
The following are the rankings of all athletes who competed at three series meets or more.

=== Men ===
Rank	Athlete	Nation	Meets	Total
1	Damian Warner	Canada	3	25753
2	Maicel Uibo	Estonia	3	25138
3	Pierce LePage	Canada	3	25059
4	Janek Õiglane	Estonia	3	24343
5	Tim Nowak	Germany	3	24215
6	Kai Kazmirek	Germany	3	24082
7	Martin Roe	Norway	4	23977
8	Kristjan Rosenberg	Estonia	3	23861
9	Fredrik Samuelsson	Sweden	3	23807
10	Paweł Wiesiołek	Poland	3	23788
11	Vital Zhuk	Belarus	4	23439
12	Risto Lillemets	Estonia	3	22942
13	Andrew Murphy	Great Britain	3	22145
14	Lindon Victor	Grenada	3	16713
15	Ilya Shkurenyov	Authorised Neutral Athletes	3	16476
16	Devon Williams	United States	3	16219
17	Mathias Brugger	Germany	3	15987
18	Bastien Auzeil	France	3	15304

=== Women ===
Rank	Athlete	Nation	Meets	Total
1	Verena Preiner	Austria	3	19623
2	Erica Bougard	United States	3	19507
3	Kendell Williams	United States	3	19437
4	Nadine Broersen	Netherlands	3	18921
5	Annie Kunz	United States	5	18318
6	Chari Hawkins	United States	3	18275
7	Noor Vidts	Belgium	3	18210
8	Riley Cooks	United States	4	17707
9	Vanessa Chefer Spínola	Brazil	3	17499
10	Allison Halverson	United States	3	17487
11	Carmen Ramos	Spain	3	16318
24	Kateřina Cachová	Czech Republic	3	12021
28	Grit Šadeiko	Estonia	3	11365
29	Marthe Koala	Burkina Faso	3	11330
