= World Athletics Combined Events Tour =

Annual track and field competition

- Current season, competition or edition: 2026 World Athletics Combined Events Tour
- Sport: Decathlon and heptathlon
- Founded: 1998
- Organizing body: World Athletics
- Most recent champions: (Estonia) Johannes Erm (men) (United States) Michelle Atherley (women) (2024)
- Website: Combined Events

The World Athletics Combined Events Tour (formerly IAAF Combined Events Challenge and World Athletics Challenge – Combined Events) is an annual series of combined track and field events meetings, organised since 1998 by World Athletics, with heptathlon for women and decathlon for men. The winners are decided by totalling the number of points that the athletes have scored in each of three combined events competitions during the season. Points scored are determined by the World Athletics combined events scoring tables. The series includes annual independent combined events meetings as well as championship level combined events competitions, such as the World Athletics Championships and Olympic Games. It is the premier seasonal competition for decathletes and heptathletes, as combined events are not held for the Diamond League.

The total prize money available is US$202,000, split evenly between male and female athletes. The male and female winners each receive $30,000, while second and third placed athletes are entitled to $20,000 and $15,000 respectively. Smaller prizes are given to the rest of the top eight finishers.

All events of the 2020 season were cancelled due to the COVID-19 pandemic.

== Editions ==
World Athletics Combined Events Tour editions
Ed.	Year	Start date	End date	Meets (Gold/total)	Ref.
1	1998				
2	1999				
3	2000	13 May	28 September		
4	2001	12 May	16 September	9	
5	2002	11 May	10 October	12	
6	2003	10 May	14 October	9	
7	2004	8 May	26 September	9	
8	2005	7 May	18 September	11	
9	2006	20 March	17 September	12	
10	2007	5 May	23 September	13	
11	2008	30 April	14 September	10	
12	2009	9 May	13 November	12	
13	2010	8 May	25 November	12	
14	2011	16 April	18 September	11	
15	2012	13 April	16 September	11	
16	2013	2 May	15 September	14	
17	2014	3 April	1 October	13	
18	2015	8 May	20 September	12	
19	2016	31 March	18 September	11	
20	2017	28 April	17 September	8	
21	2018	27 April	16 September	8	
22	2019	27 April	4 October	11	
23	2021	24 April	5 August	6	
24	2022	18 December	18 September	6 / 15	
25	2023	28 January	24 September	5 / 12	
26	2024	27 January	15 September	6 / 13	
27	2025	25 January	10 August	4 / 12	
28	2026	31 January	19 September	4 / 13	

== Meetings ==
=== Gold level ===
Since the 2022 season the Tour calendar has been expanded and divided into three levels – Gold, Silver and Bronze.

World Athletics Combined Events Tour meetings
#	Meeting	Place	Country	98	99	00	01	02	03	04	05	06	07	08	09	10	11	12	13	14	15	16	17	18	19	21	22	23	24	25	26
1	Hypo-Meeting	Götzis	Austria	X	X	X	X	X	X	X	X	X	X	X	X	X	X	X	X	X	X	X	X	X	X	X	G	G	G	G	G
2	Décastar	Talence	France	X	X	X	X	X	X	X	X	X	X	X	X	X	X	X	X	X	X	X	X	X	X		G	G	G	G	G
3	Mehrkampf-Meeting Ratingen	Ratingen	Germany	X	X	X	X	X	X	X	X	X	X	X	X	X	X	X	X	X	X	X	X	X	X	X	G	G	G		G
4	Multistars	Brescia ^{a}	Italy		X	X	X	X	X	X	X	X	X	X	X	X	X	X	X	X	X	X	X	X	X	X	G	G	G	B	S
5	Meeting International d'Arles	Arles	France						X	X	X	X	X	X	X																
6	TNT – Fortuna Meeting	Kladno	Czech Republic													X	X	X	X	X	X	X	X								
7	Meeting Internacional Arona	Arona	Spain																						X	X	G	X^{b}	G	G	B
8	Wiesław Czapiewski Memorial	Nakło nad Notecią ^{c}	Poland																								G	G	G	G	G
9	Meeting de la Réunion	Réunion	France																							X					

^{a} The Multistars meet was held in Desenzano del Garda until 2012 and in 2023, 2013–2018 in Florence, 2019–2021 in Lana, 2022 in Grosseto and 2024–2026 in Brescia.
^{b} 2023 was not part of the Combined Events Tour.
^{c} 2022–2023 was held in Bydgoszcz.

=== International competitions ===
- Summer Olympic Games
- World Athletics Championships
- Commonwealth Games
- Jeux de la Francophonie
- Mediterranean Games
- Universiade
- African Combined Events Championships
- Asian Athletics Championships
- Asian Games
- European Athletics Championships
- European Combined Events Team Championships
- Pan American Combined Events Cup
- Oceania Combined Events Championships
- USA Outdoor Track and Field Championships

== Results ==
=== Men ===
Year	Gold		Silver		Bronze	
1998	Erki Nool; Estonia	25967	Jón Arnar Magnússon; Iceland	25708	Roman Šebrle; Czech Republic	25604
1999	Tomáš Dvořák; Czech Republic	26476	Roman Šebrle; Czech Republic	25184	Chris Huffins; United States	25067
2000	Erki Nool; Estonia	26089	Tomáš Dvořák; Czech Republic	26018	Roman Šebrle; Czech Republic	25591
2001	Tomáš Dvořák; Czech Republic	25943	Erki Nool; Estonia	25839	Lev Lobodin; Russia	25044
2002	Roman Šebrle; Czech Republic	26301	Tom Pappas; United States	25506	Lev Lobodin; Russia	25179
2003	Tom Pappas; United States	26119	Roman Šebrle; Czech Republic	26047	Laurent Hernu; France	2424
2004	Roman Šebrle; Czech Republic	25952	Bryan Clay; United States	25602	Dmitriy Karpov; Kazakhstan	25336
2005	Roman Šebrle; Czech Republic	25381	Bryan Clay; United States	25199	Attila Zsivoczky; Hungary	25185
2006	Dmitriy Karpov; Kazakhstan	25145	Roman Šebrle; Czech Republic	25029	Attila Zsivoczky; Hungary	24950
2007	Roman Šebrle; Czech Republic	25261	Maurice Smith; Jamaica	25220	Aleksey Drozdov; Russia	24972
2008	Andrei Krauchanka; Belarus	25448	Leonel Suárez; Cuba	25344	Aleksandr Pogorelov; Russia	24804
2009	Trey Hardee; United States	25567	Yordanis García; Cuba	25231	Oleksiy Kasyanov; Ukraine	25056
2010	Romain Barras; France	25063	Leonel Suárez; Cuba	24857	Jake Arnold; United States	24627
2011	Leonel Suárez; Cuba	25172	Eelco Sintnicolaas; Netherlands	24772	Mikk Pahapill; Estonia	24746
2012	Hans Van Alphen; Belgium	25259	Pascal Behrenbruch; Germany	25117	Oleksiy Kasyanov; Ukraine	24822
2013	Andrei Krauchanka; Belarus	25084	Damian Warner; Canada	24980	Pascal Behrenbruch; Germany	24768
2014	Rico Freimuth; Germany	24981	Eelco Sintnicolaas; Netherlands	24795	Yordanis García; Cuba	24423
2015	Ilya Shkurenyov; Russia	25259	Michael Schrader; Germany	25252	Damian Warner; Canada	25247
2016	Kai Kazmirek; Germany	25221	Jeremy Taiwo; United States	24928	Adam Helcelet; Czech Republic	24498
2017	Rico Freimuth; Germany	25592	Damian Warner; Canada	25152	Kai Kazmirek; Germany	24986
2018	Arthur Abele; Germany	25222	Pieter Braun; Netherlands	24412	Martin Roe; Norway	24376
2019	Damian Warner; Canada	25753	Maicel Uibo; Estonia	25138	Pierce LePage; Canada	25059
2021	Kai Kazmirek; Germany	24500	Adam Helcelet; Czech Republic	24087	Martin Roe; Norway	23934
2022	Lindon Victor; Grenada	3608	Simon Ehammer; Switzerland	3578	Marcus Nilsson; Sweden	3436
2023	Karel Tilga; Estonia	3622	Sander Skotheim; Norway	3572	Lindon Victor; Grenada	3539
2024	Johannes Erm; Estonia	3661	Sander Skotheim; Norway	3624	Heath Baldwin; USA	3614

=== Women ===
Year	Gold		Silver		Bronze	
1998	Urszula Włodarczyk; Poland	19235	Irina Belova; Russia	19146	Remigija Nazarovienė; Lithuania	19053
1999	Eunice Barber; France	19880	Sabine Braun; Germany	19271	Irina Belova; Russia	19115
2000	Sabine Braun; Germany	19151	Natalya Roshchupkina; Russia	19127	Natallia Sazanovich; Belarus Urszula Włodarczyk; Poland	19047
2001	Yelena Prokhorova; Russia	19624	Natalya Roshchupkina; Russia	19357	Natallia Sazanovich; Belarus	19264
2002	Sabine Braun; Germany	18987	Shelia Burrell; United States	18747	Austra Skujytė; Lithuania	18570
2003	Carolina Klüft; Sweden	20295	Yelena Prokhorova; Russia	19019	Larissa Netšeporuk; Estonia	18482
2004	Carolina Klüft; Sweden	20541	Kelly Sotherton; United Kingdom	19072	Nataliya Dobrynska; Ukraine	18825
2005	Carolina Klüft; Sweden	20399	Eunice Barber; France	20388	Kelly Sotherton; United Kingdom	19150
2006	Carolina Klüft; Sweden	20124	Lyudmyla Blonska; Ukraine	19232	Lilli Schwarzkopf; Germany	19168
2007	Lyudmyla Blonska; Ukraine	19895	Jessica Ennis; United Kingdom	19256	Austra Skujytė; Lithuania	18994
2008	Hyleas Fountain; United States	19759	Tatyana Chernova; Russia	19575	Nataliya Dobrynska; Ukraine	19430
2009	Nataliya Dobrynska; Ukraine	19487	Jennifer Oeser; Germany	19255	Hanna Melnychenko; Ukraine	19239
2010	Jennifer Oeser; Germany	19303	Nataliya Dobrynska; Ukraine	19110	Eliška Klučinová; Czech	18608
2011	Jennifer Oeser; Germany	19594	Nataliya Dobrynska; Ukraine	19408	Karolina Tymińska; Poland	19361
2012	Antoinette Nana Djimou; France	19510	Austra Skujytė; Lithuania	19408	Laura Ikauniece-Admidiņa; Latvia	19031
2013	Hanna Melnychenko; Ukraine	19310	Brianne Theisen-Eaton; Canada	19158	Claudia Rath; Germany	19014
2014	Nadine Broersen; Netherlands	19573	Carolin Schäfer; Germany	19164	Lilli Schwarzkopf; Germany	18973
2015	Laura Ikauniece-Admidiņa; Latvia	19422	Claudia Rath; Germany	19189	Anouk Vetter; Netherlands	19112
2016	Carolin Schäfer; Germany	19573	Anouk Vetter; Netherlands	19302	Barbara Nwaba; United States	19163
2017	Carolin Schäfer; Germany	20199	Anouk Vetter; Netherlands	19496	Yorgelis Rodríguez; Cuba	19166
2018	Carolin Schäfer; Germany	19608	Erica Bougard; United States	19399	Kateřina Cachová; Czech Republic	19025
2019	Verena Preiner; Austria	19623	Erica Bougard; United States	19507	Kendell Williams; United States	19437
2021	Kendell Williams; United States	19574	María Vicente; Spain	18695	Vanessa Grimm; Germany	18661
2022	Adrianna Sułek; Poland	3498	Annik Kälin; Switzerland	3463	Emma Oosterwegel; Netherlands	3409
2023	Emma Oosterwegel; Netherlands	3454	Sophie Weissenberg; Germany	3433	Saga Vanninen; Finland	3399
2024	Michelle Atherley; United States	3466	Taliyah Brooks; United States	3421	Emma Oosterwegel; Netherlands	3421

== See also ==
- World Athletics Race Walking Tour
- IAAF World Cross Challenge
