= Šadeiko =

Family name

Šadeiko is a surname. Notable people with the surname include:

- Grete Šadeiko (born 1993), Estonian heptathlete, sister of Grit;
- Grit Šadeiko (born 1989), Estonian heptathlete.
