= 2023 World Athletics Combined Events Tour =

2024 World Athletics Combined Events Tour
- Dates: 28 January – 24 September; 29 April – 24 September (Gold)
- Meetings: 12 (Total); 5 (Gold)

The 2023 World Athletics Combined Events Tour was the 25th edition of the global series of combined track and field event meetings organised by World Athletics. This was the second season to feature the three-tier World Tour format, dividing the meetings into three competition sub-groups: Gold, Silver and Bronze.

== Rules ==
Athletes were ranked by their best three World Athletics ranking points scores achieved during the season. Ranking points were allowed to be collected on both outdoor (decathlon/heptathlon) and indoor (heptathlon/pentathlon) events. While at least two of the scores had to come from Combined Events Tour meetings, one could come from any other competition on the International Calendar.

The total prize money was US$202,000, split evenly between male and female athletes. The male and female winners each received $30,000, while second and third placed athletes were entitled to $20,000 and $15,000 respectively. Smaller prizes were given to the rest of the top eight finishers.

== Calendar ==
The calendar featured 5 Gold, 3 Silver, and 4 Bronze level meetings.

Date	Meeting	Location	Country
Gold (5)
29–30 APR 2023	Multistars	Stadio Tre Stelle, Desenzano del Garda	Italy
27–28 MAY 2023	Hypo-Meeting	Mösle-Stadium, Götzis	Austria
17–18 JUN 2023	Stadtwerke Ratingen Mehrkampf-Meeting	Stadionring, Ratingen	Germany
22–23 JUL 2023	Wiesław Czapiewski Memorial	Zdzisław Krzyszkowiak Stadium, Bydgoszcz	Poland
23–24 SEP 2023	Décastar	Stade Pierre Paul Bernard, Talence	France
Silver (3)
28–29 JAN 2023	X-Athletics	Stadium Jean-Pellez, Aubiére	France
04–05 FEB 2023	Indoor Combined Events Tallinn	Lasnamäe Kergejõustikuhall, Tallinn	Estonia
12–13 APR 2023	Mt. SAC Relays	Hilmer Lodge Stadium, Walnut, CA	United States
Bronze (4)
06–07 MAY 2023	Kinami Michitaka Memorial Athletics Meet	Yanmar Stadium Nagai, Osaka	Japan
17–18 MAY 2023	Portarathlon	Municipal Stadium, Naxos	Greece
27–28 MAY 2023	Meeting Elite Défi Athlon de Montpellier	Stade Philippides, Montpellier	France
10–11 JUN 2023	Sweden Combined Events Challenge	Ryavallen, Borås	Sweden
