= Multistars =

- Date: late April – early May
- Location: Centro Gabre Gabric, Brescia, Italy
- Event type: Athletics
- Established: 1988
- Website: multistars.it

Multistars is an annual international Combined track and field events competition held in Desenzano del Garda, Italy in late April or early May as part of the IAAF World Combined Events Challenge. International athletes compete in the decathlon for men and heptathlon for women. Established in 1988 the meeting took place in Desenzano del Garda until 2012. From 2013 to 2018 the event moved to Luigi Ridolfi Stadium in Florence before it moved once again to Lana. In 2022 the meeting took place at the Stadio Olimpico Carlo Zecchini in Grosseto bevor it moved back in 2023 to its inaugural location, the Stadio Tre Stelle Francesco Ghizzi. The 2024 through 2026 editions took place in Centro Gabre Gabric, Brescia.

The 2013 edition was capped by other invitational competitions. With a time of 39.09 Yadisleidy Pedroso set a new Italian best in 300m hurdles.

The 2020 edition was cancelled due to the COVID-19 pandemic.

== Past winners ==
Key: Meet record

Edition	Men's decathlon	Points	Women's heptathlon	Points
1988	Sasa Karan (YUG)	7554 pts	Christine Hoss (FRG)	5547 pts
1989	Alex Kruger (GBR)	7637 pts	Kim Hagger (GBR)	6047 pts
1990	Miguel Valle (CUB)	7385 pts	Liliana Năstase (ROM)	6342 pts
1991	Robert Změlík (TCH)	8297 pts	Liliana Năstase (ROM)	6482 pts
1992	Robert Změlík (TCH)	8086 pts	Liliana Năstase (ROM)	6565 pts
1993	Sheldon Blockburger (USA)	8296 pts	Svetla Dimitrova (BUL)	6470 pts
1994	Sándor Munkácsi (HUN)	7895 pts	Svetlana Buraga (BLR)	6284 pts
1995	Indrek Kaseorg (EST)	7998 pts	Irina Vostrikova (RUS)	6106 pts
1996	Robert Změlík (CZE)	8232 pts	Karin Periginelli (ITA)	5887 pts
1997	Beniamino Poserina (ITA)	8069 pts	Urszula Włodarczyk (POL)	6063 pts
1998	Oleksandr Yurkov (UKR)	8034 pts	Irina Vostrikova (RUS)	6162 pts
1999	Oleksandr Yurkov (UKR)	8215 pts	Gertrud Bacher (ITA)	6185 pts
2000	Jiří Ryba (CZE)	8339 pts	Svetlana Kazanina (KAZ)	6111 pts
2001	Indrek Kaseorg (EST)	7834 pts	Svetlana Kazanina (KAZ)	6159 pts
2002	Jaakko Ojaniemi (FIN)	8092 pts	Julie Hollman (GBR)	6093 pts
2003	Dmitriy Karpov (KAZ)	8253 pts	Margaret Simpson (GHA)	5952 pts
2004	Claston Bernard (JAM)	8050 pts	Marie Collonvillé (FRA)	6228 pts
2005	Phil McMullen (USA)	8107 pts	Margaret Simpson (GHA)	6006 pts
2006	Chris Boyles (USA)	7855 pts	Karolina Tymińska (POL)	6178 pts
2007	Paul Terek (USA)	8134 pts	Jessica Ennis (GBR)	6388 pts
2008	Frédéric Xhonneux (BEL)	8142 pts	Marie Collonvillé (FRA)	6256 pts
2009	Jake Arnold (USA)	7994 pts	Jessica Ennis (GBR)	6587 pts
2010	Jake Arnold (USA)	7994 pts	Marina Goncharova (RUS)	6008 pts
2011	Luiz Alberto de Araújo (BRA)	7858 pts	Margaret Simpson (GHA)	6270 pts
2012	Dmitriy Karpov (KAZ)	8172 pts	Sofia Yfantidou (GRE)	6109 pts
2013	Andrei Krauchanka (BLR)	8390 pts	Anouk Vetter (NED)	5872 pts
2014	Eelco Sintnicolaas (NED)	8161 pts	Morgan Lake (GBR)	5896 pts
2015	Paweł Wiesiołek (POL)	7863 pts	Sofia Yfantidou (GRE)	5900 pts
2016	Lars Vikan Rise (NOR)	7868 pts	Vanessa Spínola (BRA)	6100 pts
2017	Jefferson Santos (BRA)	7728 pts	Evelis Aguilar (COL)	6228 pts
2018	Martin Roe (NOR)	8228 pts	Erica Bougard (USA)	6327 pts
2019	Jan Doležal (CZE)	8117 pts	Annie Kunz (USA)	5971 pts
2021	Martin Roe (NOR)	8055 pts	María Vicente (ESP)	6304 pts
2022	Markus Rooth (NOR)	8307 pts	Annik Kälin (SUI)	6398 pts
2023	Karel Tilga (EST)	8482 pts	Taliyah Brooks (USA)	6330 pts
2024	Jente Hauttekeete (BEL)	8020 pts	Taliyah Brooks (USA)	6330 pts
2025	Lewis Church (GBR)	8067 pts	Julia Słocka (POL)	5840 pts
2026	Simon Ehammer (SUI)	8361 pts	Lovisa Karlsson (SWE)	6190 pts

== Medalists since 2009 ==
=== Men ===
Year	Gold		Silver		Bronze	
2009	Jake Arnold (USA)	7994	Roland Schwarzl (AUT)	7913	Willem Coertzen (RSA)	7907
2010	Jake Arnold (USA)	8141	Leonel Suárez (CUB)	8112	Yordanis García (CUB)	8048
2011	Luiz Alberto de Araújo (BRA)	7858	Brent Newdick (NZL)	7780	Hamdi Dhouibi (TUN)	7731
2012	Dmitriy Karpov (KAZ)	8172	Ashley Bryant (GBR)	7689	Einar Lárusson (ISL)	7590
2013	Andrei Krauchanka (BLR)	8390	Ashley Bryant (GBR)	7985	Paweł Wiesiołek (POL)	7727
2014	Eelco Sintnicolaas (NED)	8161	Ashley Bryant (GBR)	7802	Pieter Braun (NED)	7773
2015	Paweł Wiesiołek (POL)	7863	Liam Ramsay (GBR)	7752	Simone Cairoli (ITA)	7611
2016	Lars Vikan Rise (NOR)	7868	Martin Roe (NOR)	7855	Miller Moss (USA)	7712
2017	Jefferson Santos (BRA)	7728	Simone Cairoli (ITA)	7535	Gael Querin (FRA)	7363
2018	Martin Roe (NOR)	8228	Yury Yaremich (BLR)	7985	Taavi Tšernjavski (EST)	7873
2019	Jan Dolezal (CZE)	8117	Kristjan Rosenberg (EST)	7950	Mathias Brugger (GER)	7927
2021	Martin Roe (NOR)	8055	Adam Helcelet (CZE)	8025	Fredrick Samuelson (SWE)	7815
2022	Markus Rooth (NOR)	8307	Sander Skotheim (NOR)	8298	Dario Dester (ITA)	8109
2023	Karel Tilga (EST)	8482	Fredrik Samuelsson (SWE)	8070	Devon Williams (USA)	7956
2024	Jente Hauttekeete (BEL)	8020	Risto Lillemets (EST)	7971	Téo Bastien (FRA)	7963
2025	Lewis Church (GBR)	8067	Simon Ehammer (SUI)	7899	Antoine Ferranti (FRA)	7885
2026	Simon Ehammer (SUI)	8361	José Fernando Ferreira (BRA)	8057	Julio Angulo (COL)	8005

=== Women ===
Year	Gold		Silver		Bronze	
2009	Jessica Ennis (GBR)	6587	Hanna Melnychenko (UKR)	6077	Yuliya Tarasova (UZB)	5989
2010	Marina Goncharova (RUS)	6008	Margaret Simpson (GHA)	5929	Hanna Melnychenko (UKR)	5895
2011	Margaret Simpson (GHA)	6270	Marina Goncharova (RUS)	5995	Francesca Doveri (ITA)	5988
2012	Sofia Yfantidou (GRE)	6109	Blandine Maisonnier (FRA)	6082	Katarina Johnson-Thompson (GBR)	6007
2013	Anouk Vetter (NED)	5872	Jo Rowland (GBR)	5638	Nadine Visser (NED)	5577
2014	Morgan Lake (GBR)	5896	Katsiaryna Netsviatayeva (BLR)	5868	Jessica Zelinka (CAN)	5660
2015	Sofia Yfantidou (GRE)	5900	Katsiaryna Netsviatayeva (BLR)	5806	Uhunoma Osazuwa (NGR)	5794
2016	Vanessa Chefer Spínola (BRA)	6100	Portia Bing (NZL)	5987	Sofia Yfantidou (GRE)	5953
2017	Evelis Aguilar (COL)	6228	Yana Maksimava (BLR)	5901	Tamara de Sousa (BRA)	5866
2018	Erica Bougard (USA)	6327	Alex Gochenour (USA)	6063	Lecabela Quaresma (POR)	5886
2019	Annie Kunz (USA)	5971	Kate O'Connor (IRE)	5881	Riley Cooks (USA)	5873
2021	María Vicente (ESP)	6304	Kate O'Connor (IRE)	6297	Marthe Koala (BUR)	6238
2022	Annik Kälin (SUI)	6398	Sveva Gerevini (ITA)	6011	Claudia Conte (ESP)	5914
2023	Taliyah Brooks (USA)	6330	Jade O'Dowda (GBR)	6178	Chari Hawkins (USA)	6036
2024	Taliyah Brooks (USA)	6330	Kate O'Connor (IRL)	6104	Katelyn Adel (SUI)	6082
2025	Julia Słocka (POL)	5840	Liana Trümpi (SUI)	5822	Betty Jensen (DEN)	5818
2026	Lovisa Karlsson (SWE)	6190	Jéssica Barreira (POR)	6077	Mathilde Rey (SUI)	5876

== Records ==
Event	Athlete	Record	Date	Ref.
Men's decathlon	Karel Tilga (EST)	8482 pts	29–30 April 2023	
100 m	Chris Huffins (USA)	10.40 (+0.5 m/s)	8 May 1999	
Long jump	Simon Ehammer (SUI)	7.86 m (+0.1 m/s)	25 April 2026	
Shot put	José Lemos (COL)	16.62 m	27 April 2019	
High jump	Chris Boyles (USA)	2.18 m	7 May 2005	
400 m	David Hall (GBR)	46.46	15 May 2015	
110 m hurdles	Simon Ehammer (SUI)	13.74 (−0.8 m/s)	26 April 2026	
Discus throw	Brian Brophy (USA)	52.02 m	16 May 1993	
Pole vault	Paul Terek (USA)	5.42 m	11 May 2003	
Javelin throw	Ashley Bryant (GBR)	70.42 m	3 May 2013	
1500 m	Joseph Detmer (USA)	4:05.31	11 May 2008	
Women's heptathlon	Jessica Ennis (GBR)	6589 pts	2009	
100 m hurdles	Liliana Nastase (ROM)	12.91	16 May 1992	
High jump	Jessica Ennis (GBR)	1.95 m	5 May 2007	
Shot put	Vera Yepimashko (BLR)	16.68 m	8 May 2004	
200 m	Yasmina Azzizi (ALG)	23.38	16 May 1992	
Long jump	Liliana Nastase (ROM)	6.71 m	17 May 1992	
Javelin throw	Sofia Yfantidou (GRE)	55.81 m	29 April 2017	
Javelin throw (old model)	Nathalie Teppe (FRA)	59.26 m	16 May 1993	
800 m	Monica Westen (SWE)	2:05.20	17 May 1992	
