= 2022 Hypo-Meeting =

- Venue: Mösle Stadium
- Location: Götzis, Austria
- Dates: May 28–May 29
- Website: https://meeting-goetzis.at/en/

Champions
- Men: (Canada) Damian Warner (8797)
- Women: (Netherlands) Anouk Vetter (6693)

The 47th edition of the annual Hypo-Meeting took place on May 28 and May 29, 2022, in Götzis, Vorarlberg (Austria). The track and field competition, featuring a men's decathlon and a women's heptathlon event was part of the 2022 World Athletics Combined Events Tour.

== Men's decathlon ==
=== Records ===
World Record	Kevin Mayer (FRA)	9126	16 September 2018	Talence, France
Event Record	Roman Šebrle (CZE)	9026	27 May 2001	Götzis, Austria

=== Results ===
The best mark recorded in each event is highlighted in yellow

Rank	Athlete	Decathlon										Points
Rank	Athlete	100	LJ	SP	HJ	400	110H	DT	PV	JT	1500	Points
1	Damian Warner (CAN)	10.14	7.93	14.92	2.03	47.92	13.48	48.24	4.90	58.62	4:38.65	8797 SB
2	Lindon Victor (GRN)	10.72	7.42	16.28	2.00	48.85	14.66	54.85	4.70	63.93	4:55.00	8447 SB
3	Simon Ehammer (SUI)	10.46	8.45 NR	14.42	2.03	48.44	13.75	36.98	5.10	55.98	5:08.51	8377 NR
4	Niklas Kaul (GER)	11.18	7.28	14.59	1.91	48.62	14.59	45.09	4.80	69.29	4:16.31	8303 SB
5	Kai Kazmirek (GER)	10.91	7.56	14.16	2.03	48.28	14.56	43.83	5.00	59.86	4:39.41	8272 SB
6	Rik Taam (NED)	10.62	7.15	13.90	1.97	47.28	14.45	42.73	4.90	56.60	4:21.28	8246 PB
7	Maicel Uibo (EST)	11.21	7.17	14.33	2.06	51.72	14.95	47.81	5.30	58.32	4:43.89	8067 SB
8	Hunter Price (USA)	11.00	7.41	14.38	2.09	49.65	14.35	41.22	4.40	58.37	4:38.62	7996 SB
9	Finley Gaio (SUI)	10.54	7.70	14.30	1.88	48.50	13.86	39.67	4.80	45.80	4:45.96	7949 PB
10	Malik Diakite (GER)	11.06	7.58	13.65	1.91	47.42	14.98	41.03	4.40	53.82	4:29.28	7832
11	František Doubek (CZE)	10.79	7.14	13.45	1.97	49.18	15.08	42.31	4.60	56.87	4:36.09	7817 SB
12	Sven Roosen (NED)	10.90	7.19	13.73	1.88	48.07	14.72	41.07	4.30	55.10	4:22.85	7784 SB
13	Jack Flood (USA)	11.04	7.10	13.33	2.03	50.13	14.14	40.32	4.50	50.05	4:38.62	7683
14	Fran Bonifačić (CRO)	11.43	6.90	14.07	1.82	52.66	15.36	41.05	4.70	55.04	4:31.14	7343 SB
15	Risto Lillemets (EST)	10.83	7.25	14.97	2.00	49.76	14.47	43.89	NM	58.93	4:33.22	7295 SB
16	Jan Mitche (AUT)	10.97	6.58	14.67	1.94	50.65	14.53	38.65	4.00	49.86	4:45.61	7279 PB
DNF	Arthur Abele (GER)	11.06	7.05	14.89	1.82	50.20	14.30	44.32	NM	59.82	DNS	DNF
DNF	Hans-Christian Hausenberg (EST)	10.68	7.85	13.32	1.85	DNS						DNF
DNF	Paweł Wiesiołek (POL)	11.01	7.34	14.59	1.91	DNS						DNF
DNF	Tim Nowak (GER)	11.36	7.11	14.11	2.03	DNS						DNF
DNF	Baptiste Thiery (FRA)	10.79	7.01	11.64	1.76	DNS						DNF
DNF	Niels Pittomvils (BEL)	11.37	6.94	14.94	DNS							DNF
DNF	Pierce Lepage (CAN)	10.35	7.49	DNS								DNF
DNS	Joseph Delgado (USA)											DNS

== Women's heptathlon ==
=== Records ===
World Record	Jackie Joyner-Kersee (USA)	7291	September 24, 1988	Seoul, South Korea
Event Record	Nafissatou Thiam (BEL)	7013	May 28, 2017	Götzis, Austria

=== Results ===
The best mark recorded in each event is highlighted in yellow

Rank	Athlete	Heptathlon							Points
Rank	Athlete	100H	HJ	SP	200m	LJ	JT	800m	Points
1	Anouk Vetter (NED)	13.28	1.74	14.88	23.76	6.47	59.81	2:21.56	6693 NR, WL
2	Adriana Sulek (POL)	13.61	1.92	13.79	23.86	6.28	38.66	2:13.80	6429 PB
3	Vanessa Grimm (GER)	13.95	1.80	14.96	24.62	6.31	44.44	2:15.83	6323 PB
4	Annik Kälin (SUI)	13.48	1.74	13.78	23.89	6.41	45.74	2:20.35	6301
5	Emma Oosterwegel (NED)	13.83	1.77	13.33	24.75	6.01	52.53	2:14.50	6265 SB
6	Holly Mills (GBR)	13.41	1.77	13.36	24.47	6.25	39.07	2:08.07	6260 PB
7	Katarina Johnson Thompson (GBR)	13.80	1.77	12.87	23.51	6.37	40.78	2:19.34	6174 SB
8	Odile Ahouanwanou (BEN)	13.52	1.74	15.27	24.26	6.11	45.24	2:26.51	6173 SB
9	Sophie Weißenberg (GER)	13.56	1.80	12.53	23.67	6.20	46.32	2:26.88	6161
10	Saga Vanninen (FIN)	13.67	1.74	14.58	25.14	6.15	46.70	2:24.08	6097 SB
11	Sofie Dokter (NED)	13.64	1.74	13.27	23.91	6.18	40.50	2:18.71	6090 PB
12	Paulina Ligarska (POL)	14.36	1.77	13.84	25.08	5.99	45.22	2:15.24	6034 PB
13	Laura Ikauniece (LAT)	14.22	1.71	13.70	25.00	5.75	53.93	2:18.33	6031 SB
14	Esther Turpin (FRA)	13.31	1.68	13.41	24.73	5.92	42.47	2:14.46	6015 SB
15	Ekaterina Voronina (UZB)	14.42	1.77	13.37	25.18	5.82	47.10	2:14.35	5984 SB
16	Chiara-Belinda Schuler (AUT)	14.20	1.65	13.41	25.25	6.02	49.31	2:23.21	5847 PB
17	Yuliya Loban (UKR)	14.05	1.74	14.58	25.49	5.59	45.13	2:22.01	5837 SB
18	Liisa-Maria Lusti (EST)	14.01	1.86	10.68	24.63	6.18	38.68	2:24.50	5836 NJR
19	Céline Albisser (SUI)	14.25	1.65	12.32	24.35	6.06	36.20	2:14.45	5731 SB
20	Adriana Rodríguez (CUB)	14.62	1.74	13.29	25.66	5.55	44.34	2:24.18	5603 SB
DNF	Chari Hawkins (USA)	13.37	1.77	13.25	24.34	5.95	40.15	DNS	DNF
DNF	Kendell Williams (USA)	13.13	1.80	13.20	23.77	6.47	NM	DNS	DNF
DNF	Kate O'Connor (IRL)	13.94	1.68	13.63	25.13	DNS			DNF
