= 2019 Décastar =

The 2019 Décastar was the 43rd edition of the annual two-day track and field meeting for combined track and field events. It took place on 22 and 23 June 2019 in Talence, France. The competition, featuring a decathlon (men) and a heptathlon (women) event, was part of the 2019 IAAF World Combined Events Challenge.

== Men's decathlon ==
=== Schedule ===
22 June
1. 100 m
2. Long jump
3. Shot put
4. High jump
5. 400 m

23 June
6. 110 m hurdles
7. Discus throw
8. Pole vault
9. Javelin throw
10. 1.500 m

=== Results ===
Rank	Athlete	Nation	Score
1st place, gold medalist(s)	Pierce LePage	Canada	8453 pts
2nd place, silver medalist(s)	Zach Ziemek	United States	8344 pts
3rd place, bronze medalist(s)	Thomas van der Plaetsen	Belgium	8214 pts
4	Leonel Suárez	Cuba	7965 pts
5	Jérémy Lelièvre	France	7778 pts
6	Bastien Auzeil	France	7671 pts
7	Benjamin Hougardy	Belgium	7561 pts
8	Maxime Maugein	France	7398 pts
9	Vital Zhuk	Belarus	7144 pts
—	Romain Martin	France	DNF
—	Kevin Mayer	France	DNF
—	Ilya Shkurenyov	Russia	DNF

== Women's heptathlon ==
=== Schedule ===
22 June
1. 100 m hurdles
2. High jump
3. Shot put
4. 200 m

23 June
5. Long jump
6. Javelin throw
7. 800 m

=== Results ===
Rank	Athlete	Nation	Score
1st place, gold medalist(s)	Nafissatou Thiam	Belgium	6819 pts
2nd place, silver medalist(s)	Xénia Krizsán	Hungary	6619 pts
3rd place, bronze medalist(s)	Laura Ikauniece	Latvia	6518 pts
4	Solène Ndama	France	6290 pts
5	Marthe Koala	Burkina Faso	6235 pts
6	Odile Ahouanwanou	Benin	6200 pts
7	Grit Šadeiko	Estonia	6162 pts
8	Lecabela Quaresma	Portugal	5932 pts
9	Riley Cooks	United States	5902 pts
10	Esther Turpin	France	5808 pts
11	Yuki Yamasaki	Japan	5680 pts
12	Antoinette Nana Djimou	France	5679 pts
—	Anouk Vetter	Netherlands	DNF
