= 2012 World Junior Championships in Athletics – Women's heptathlon =

The women's heptathlon at the 2012 World Junior Championships in Athletics was held at the Estadi Olímpic Lluís Companys on 12 and 13 July.

== Medalists ==
Gold	Yorgelis Rodríguez; Cuba
Silver	Xénia Krizsán; Hungary
Bronze	Tamara de Sousa; Brazil

== Records ==
Prior to the competition, the existing world junior and championship records were as follows.

World Junior Record	Carolina Klüft (SWE)	6542	Munich, Germany	10 August 2002
Championship Record	Carolina Klüft (SWE)	6470	Kingston, Jamaica	20 July 2002
World Junior Leading	Katarina Johnson-Thompson (GBR)	6248	Kladno, Czech Republic	10 June 2012

== Results ==
=== 100 metres hurdles ===
Rank	Heat	Lane	Name	Nationality	Time	Notes	Points
1	4	8	Erica Bougard	United States	13.73		1017
2	4	6	Kendell Williams	United States	13.74		1015
3	4	3	Nadine Visser	Netherlands	13.76		1013
4	4	9	Sofia Linde	Sweden	13.86		998
5	3	6	Lucia Mokrášová	Slovakia	13.99	PB	980
6	4	4	Qingling Wang	China	14.09		966
6	4	7	Melissa-Maree Farrington	Australia	14.09		966
8	4	2	Yorgelis Rodríguez	Cuba	14.10		964
9	3	5	Elodie Jakob	Switzerland	14.12	SB	961
10	4	5	Tamara de Sousa	Brazil	14.13		960
11	3	2	Portia Bing	New Zealand	14.14	PB	959
12	3	8	Katy Marchant	Great Britain	14.15	PB	957
13	3	3	Emma Buckett	Great Britain	14.18		953
14	1	8	Yusleidys Mendieta	Cuba	14.23	PB	946
15	3	4	Xénia Krizsán	Hungary	14.25		943
16	2	7	Grete Šadeiko	Estonia	14.30	PB	936
17	3	9	Patricia Ortega	Spain	14.36	PB	928
18	2	8	Nafissatou Thiam	Belgium	14.44	PB	917
19	1	7	Frida Thorsås	Norway	14.53	PB	905
20	2	6	Ivona Dadic	Austria	14.55	PB	902
21	2	4	Nataliya Bashly	Ukraine	14.64	PB	890
22	2	5	Tania Mayer	Switzerland	14.68	PB	884
23	2	3	Henna Palosaari	Finland	14.72		879
24	1	9	Georgia Ellenwood	Canada	14.76	PB	874
25	1	4	Maria Run Gunnlaugsdóttir	Iceland	14.90	SB	855
26	2	9	Jutta Heikkinen	Finland	14.91	PB	854
27	1	3	Kristella Jurkatamm	Estonia	15.01	PB	840
28	1	5	Kateryna Tabashnyk	Ukraine	15.38		792
29	1	6	Laura Arteil	France	18.41		447
	3	7	Anouk Vetter	Netherlands	DNF		0

=== High jump ===
Rank	Group	Name	Nationality	1.51	1.54	1.57	1.60	1.63	1.66	1.69	1.72	1.75	1.78	1.81	1.84	1.87	Result	Notes	Points
1	A	Kateryna Tabashnyk	Ukraine	-	-	-	-	-	-	o	-	o	o	o	xo	xxx	1.84		1029
2	A	Yorgelis Rodríguez	Cuba	-	-	-	-	-	o	-	xxo	xo	o	o	xxx		1.81		991
2	A	Nafissatou Thiam	Belgium	-	-	-	-	-	xo	o	xo	o	xo	o	xxx		1.81		991
4	A	Kendell Williams	United States	-	-	-	-	o	o	xo	o	o	o	xxo	xxx		1.81		991
5	A	Xénia Krizsán	Hungary	-	-	-	o	o	o	o	o	xo	o	xxx			1.78	SB	953
6	A	Tamara de Sousa	Brazil	-	-	-	xo	o	o	o	o	o	xxx				1.75	PB	916
7	A	Lucia Mokrášová	Slovakia	-	-	-	o	o	o	xo	xo	o	xxx				1.75	PB	916
8	A	Anouk Vetter	Netherlands	-	-	-	-	o	-	o	-	xo	xxx				1.75	PB	916
9	A	Portia Bing	New Zealand	-	-	o	-	o	o	o	o	xxo	x				1.75	PB	916
10	A	Sofia Linde	Sweden	-	-	-	o	xo	o	o	o	xxx					1.72		879
11	A	Grete Šadeiko	Estonia	-	-	-	-	xo	o	xo	o	xxx					1.72		879
12	A	Ivona Dadic	Austria	-	-	-	-	o	o	xxo	xxo	xxx					1.72		879
13	B	Erica Bougard	United States	-	o	o	o	o	xxo	xo	xxo	xxx					1.72	PB	879
14	B	Nadine Visser	Netherlands	-	-	o	o	xo	xo	xxo	xxo	x					1.72	PB	879
15	A	Qingling Wang	China	-	o	o	o	xo	xxo	o	xxx						1.69		842
16	A	Emma Buckett	Great Britain	-	-	o	o	o	xxo	xo	xxx						1.69		842
17	B	Yusleidys Mendieta	Cuba	-	-	-	o	-	o	-	xxx						1.66	SB	806
18	B	Georgia Ellenwood	Canada	-	o	o	o	xxo	o	xxx							1.66	PB	806
19	B	Kristella Jurkatamm	Estonia	-	o	o	o	o	xo	xxx							1.66		806
19	B	Maria Run Gunnlaugsdóttir	Iceland	-	o	o	o	o	xo	xxx							1.66	PB	806
19	B	Jutta Heikkinen	Finland	-	-	o	o	o	xo	xxx							1.66		806
22	B	Patricia Ortega	Spain	o	-	o	xo	o	xxx								1.63	PB	771
22	A	Melissa-Maree Farrington	Australia	-	-	o	xo	o	xxx								1.63		771
24	B	Henna Palosaari	Finland	-	o	o	xo	xo	xxx								1.63		771
25	B	Katy Marchant	Great Britain	-	o	o	xo	xxo	xxx								1.63		771
26	B	Laura Arteil	France	o	o	o	o	xxx									1.60	PB	736
27	B	Tania Mayer	Switzerland	o	o	xo	o	xxx									1.60	SB	736
28	B	Frida Thorsås	Norway	-	o	xo	xo	xxx									1.60		736
29	B	Nataliya Bashly	Ukraine	-	-	xo	xxo	xxx									1.60		736
	B	Elodie Jakob	Switzerland	xx													NM		0

=== Shot put ===
Rank	Group	Name	Nationality	#1	#2	#3	Result	Notes	Points
1	A	Tamara de Sousa	Brazil	13.81	12.09	13.89	13.89		787
2	A	Nafissatou Thiam	Belgium	13.46	12.71	13.52	13.52		762
3	A	Sofia Linde	Sweden	10.50	8.30	13.29	13.29		747
4	A	Yusleidys Mendieta	Cuba	12.34	12.77	x	12.77		712
5	A	Xénia Krizsán	Hungary	x	12.76	12.25	12.76	PB	711
6	A	Nadine Visser	Netherlands	12.55	12.02	12.26	12.55	PB	698
7	A	Ivona Dadic	Austria	12.27	12.01	x	12.27		679
8	A	Tania Mayer	Switzerland	11.48	11.97	11.63	11.97		659
9	A	Yorgelis Rodriguez	Cuba	x	11.45	11.92	11.92		656
10	A	Frida Thorsås	Norway	x	11.73	11.91	11.91		655
11	A	Qingling Wang	China	11.54	11.47	11.12	11.54		631
11	B	Emma Buckett	Great Britain	11.54	10.97	10.91	11.54		631
13	B	Melissa-Maree Farrington	Australia	9.92	10.59	11.53	11.53	PB	630
14	B	Grete Šadeiko	Estonia	10.57	11.43	11.14	11.43	PB	628
15	A	Laura Arteil	France	x	11.34	x	11.34		618
16	B	Portia Bing	New Zealand	10.64	10.73	11.24	11.24	PB	611
17	A	Nataliya Bashly	Ukraine	11.11	11.11	11.20	11.20		608
18	B	Katy Marchant	Great Britain	11.08	11.15	10.86	11.15		605
19	B	Jutta Heikkinen	Finland	10.42	10.61	10.87	10.87		587
20	B	Lucia Mokrášová	Slovakia	10.86	10.31	10.31	10.86		586
21	B	Kendell Williams	United States	9.30	9.39	10.70	10.70	PB	575
22	B	Maria Run Gunnlaugsdóttir	Iceland	10.25	10.57	10.31	10.57	PB	567
23	B	Henna Palosaari	Finland	10.50	x	x	10.50		562
24	B	Kateryna Tabashnyk	Ukraine	10.32	x	9.87	10.32		550
25	B	Erica Bougard	United States	9.72	10.22	9.87	10.22	PB	544
26	B	Kristella Jurkatamm	Estonia	10.01	x	x	10.01	PB	530
27	B	Georgia Ellenwood	Canada	9.99	9.57	9.88	9.99	PB	529
28	B	Patricia Ortega	Spain	9.28	8.38	9.30	9.30	SB	484
	A	Elodie Jakob	Switzerland				DNS		0
	A	Anouk Vetter	Netherlands				DNS		0

=== 200 metres ===
Rank	Heat	Lane	Name	Nationality	Time	Notes	Points
1	4	7	Tamara de Sousa	Brazil	24.06	PB	975
2	4	3	Lucia Mokrášová	Slovakia	24.33	PB	949
3	1	5	Yusleidys Mendieta	Cuba	24.41	PB	942
3	4	4	Yorgelis Rodriguez	Cuba	24.41	PB	942
5	4	2	Ivona Dadic	Austria	24.46		937
6	3	9	Qingling Wang	China	24.62	PB	922
7	1	3	Erica Bougard	United States	24.64	SB	920
8	4	6	Portia Bing	New Zealand	24.65	PB	919
9	1	9	Kendell Williams	United States	24.94	SB	892
10	4	9	Tania Mayer	Switzerland	24.95	PB	891
11	3	5	Nadine Visser	Netherlands	25.07		880
12	3	7	Laura Arteil	France	25.11	PB	877
13	4	8	Melissa-Maree Farrington	Australia	25.13		875
14	3	8	Georgia Ellenwood	Canada	25.18	PB	870
15	3	6	Grete Šadeiko	Estonia	25.27	SB	862
16	3	4	Kristella Jurkatamm	Estonia	25.29		860
17	3	3	Nafissatou Thiam	Belgium	25.31		859
18	3	2	Sofia Linde	Sweden	25.81		814
19	2	8	Xénia Krizsán	Hungary	25.83	SB	812
20	2	7	Emma Buckett	Great Britain	25.91	PB	805
21	2	6	Jutta Heikkinen	Finland	26.00		797
22	2	5	Patricia Ortega	Spain	26.01		796
23	1	4	Maria Run Gunnlaugsdóttir	Iceland	26.25	SB	775
23	2	9	Frida Thorsås	Norway	26.25		775
25	1	6	Nataliya Bashly	Ukraine	26.41	PB	762
26	1	7	Henna Palosaari	Finland	26.44	SB	759
27	2	4	Katy Marchant	Great Britain	26.78		730
28	1	8	Kateryna Tabashnyk	Ukraine	26.94	PB	717
	2	3	Elodie Jakob	Switzerland	DNS		0
	4	5	Anouk Vetter	Netherlands	DNS		0

=== Long jump ===
Rank	Group	Name	Nationality	#1	#2	#3	Result	Notes	Points
1	B	Qingling Wang	China	6.10	6.21	x	6.21	SB	915
2	B	Emma Buckett	Great Britain	6.15	x	5.68	6.15		896
3	B	Sofia Linde	Sweden	6.12	x	5.89	6.12	PB	887
4	B	Kendell Williams	United States	5.89	6.11	5.98	6.11		883
4	B	Laura Arteil	France	6.11	x	5.87	6.11	PB	883
6	B	Yorgelis Rodríguez	Cuba	6.10	5.43	5.97	6.10		880
7	A	Kristella Jurkatamm	Estonia	6.06	5.58	x	6.06		868
7	A	Tamara de Sousa	Brazil	5.53	6.02	6.06	6.06		868
9	A	Lucia Mokrášová	Slovakia	6.03	5.96	x	6.03		859
10	B	Yusleidys Mendieta	Cuba	5.69	5.91	5.96	5.96		837
11	B	Ivona Dadic	Austria	5.89	3.81	5.94	5.94		831
11	B	Xénia Krizsán	Hungary	5.65	x	5.94	5.94		831
13	A	Portia Bing	New Zealand	5.86	5.81	5.91	5.91	PB	822
14	B	Melissa-Maree Farrington	Australia	5.90	5.85	5.79	5.90		819
15	B	Grete Šadeiko	Estonia	x	x	5.83	5.83	PB	798
16	B	Erica Bougard	United States	5.68	5.82	5.18	5.82		795
17	A	Tania Mayer	Switzerland	5.46	5.79	5.55	5.79	PB	786
18	B	Henna Palosaari	Finland	x	5.75	x	5.75	PB	774
19	A	Georgia Ellenwood	Canada	5.73	x	5.53	5.73		768
20	A	Frida Thorsås	Norway	5.71	5.30	5.66	5.71		762
20	A	Nadine Visser	Netherlands	5.71	5.50	x	5.71		762
22	A	Patricia Ortega	Spain	5.52	5.12	5.70	5.70		759
23	A	Nataliya Bashly	Ukraine	5.60	5.44	5.44	5.60		729
24	A	Katy Marchant	Great Britain	5.48	5.40	x	5.48		694
25	A	Jutta Heikkinen	Finland	5.38	5.01	5.18	5.38	PB	665
26	A	Maria Run Gunnlaugsdóttir	Iceland	x	4.96	x	4.96	SB	548
27	B	Nafissatou Thiam	Belgium	x	x	4.39	4.39		401
	B	Kateryna Tabashnyk	Ukraine	x	x	-	NM		0
	A	Anouk Vetter	Netherlands				DNS		0
	A	Elodie Jakob	Switzerland				DNS		0

=== Javelin throw ===
Rank	Group	Name	Nationality	#1	#2	#3	Result	Notes	Points
1	A	Xénia Krizsán	Hungary	48.40	47.47	43.80	48.40		829
2	A	Nafissatou Thiam	Belgium	44.99	40.59	42.61	44.99	PB	763
3	A	Tamara de Sousa	Brazil	38.06	39.56	42.51	42.51	PB	716
4	A	Yusleidys Mendieta	Cuba	41.72	41.79	x	41.79		702
5	A	Laura Arteil	France	36.20	40.79	x	40.79		682
6	A	Frida Thorsås	Norway	37.71	40.14	40.28	40.28		673
7	A	Jutta Heikkinen	Finland	39.93	39.96	38.35	39.96		667
8	A	Yorgelis Rodríguez	Cuba	39.30	39.90	x	39.90		665
9	A	Sofia Linde	Sweden	39.40	x	x	39.40	PB	656
10	B	Maria Run Gunnlaugsdóttir	Iceland	39.13	x	32.88	39.13	PB	651
11	A	Tania Mayer	Switzerland	38.32	38.05	36.35	38.32		635
12	A	Grete Šadeiko	Estonia	37.06	x	34.08	37.06		611
13	A	Kristella Jurkatamm	Estonia	30.86	36.94	32.02	36.94		609
14	B	Portia Bing	New Zealand	36.88	35.43	34.14	36.88		608
15	A	Katy Marchant	Great Britain	32.95	36.10	x	36.10		593
16	B	Georgia Ellenwood	Canada	35.68	36.02	34.21	36.02		591
17	B	Henna Palosaari	Finland	35.66	35.04	33.23	35.66		584
18	B	Nataliia Bashly	Ukraine	34.54	34.48	32.09	34.54		563
19	B	Qingling Wang	China	31.14	34.08	33.00	34.08		554
20	B	Nadine Visser	Netherlands	32.99	32.44	29.44	32.99		533
21	B	Melissa-Maree Farrington	Australia	31.87	29.71	29.98	31.87	SB	512
22	B	Emma Buckett	Great Britain	x	28.05	31.83	31.83	PB	511
23	B	Lucia Mokrášová	Slovakia	30.66	31.36	x	31.36		502
24	B	Kendell Williams	United States	28.08	30.48	25.85	30.48	PB	486
25	B	Patricia Ortega	Spain	24.70	x	27.34	27.34		426
26	B	Erica Bougard	United States	x	24.20	x	24.20		367
	A	Anouk Vetter	Netherlands				DNS		0
	A	Elodie Jakob	Switzerland				DNS		0
	B	Kateryna Tabashnyk	Ukraine				DNS		0
	B	Ivona Dadic	Austria				DNS		0

=== 800 metres ===
Rank	Heat	Lane	Name	Nationality	Time	Notes	Points
1	2	5	Frida Thorsås	Norway	2:12.89		923
2	2	2	Erica Bougard	United States	2:15.36		888
3	3	3	Xénia Krizsán	Hungary	2:16.08	PB	878
4	3	1	Yorgelis Rodríguez	Cuba	2:16.75	PB	868
5	3	8	Sofia Linde	Sweden	2:18.36	PB	846
6	1	7	Georgia Ellenwood	Canada	2:19.98	PB	824
7	3	7	Portia Bing	New Zealand	2:20.42	PB	818
8	3	6	Lucia Mokrášová	Slovakia	2:20.44	PB	818
9	2	3	Grete Šadeiko	Estonia	2:21.11	SB	808
10	1	2	Henna Palosaari	Finland	2:23.87	SB	772
11	3	4	Qingling Wang	China	2:24.14	PB	768
12	2	9	Emma Buckett	Great Britain	2:25.88	PB	745
13	2	6	Nafissatou Thiam	Belgium	2:26.58	PB	736
14	3	9	Kendell Williams	United States	2:26.60	PB	736
15	2	1	Tania Mayer	Switzerland	2:27.19		729
16	1	5	Maria Run Gunnlaugsdóttir	Iceland	2:27.29	SB	727
16	2	8	Melissa-Maree Farrington	Australia	2:27.29		727
18	1	6	Patricia Ortega	Spain	2:28.48	SB	712
19	1	3	Katy Marchant	Great Britain	2:29.77		696
20	2	4	Nadine Visser	Netherlands	2:30.88		682
21	3	2	Tamara de Sousa	Brazil	2:31.23	PB	678
22	2	7	Kristella Jurkatamm	Estonia	2:31.47	PB	675
23	1	4	Nataliia Bashly	Ukraine	2:32.69		660
24	3	5	Yusleidys Mendieta	Cuba	2:40.34	SB	569
	1	1	Laura Arteil	France	DNS		
	1	8	Jutta Heikkinen	Finland	DNS		

== Final standings ==
Rank	Name	Nationality	Points	Notes
1st place, gold medalist(s)	Yorgelis Rodríguez	Cuba	5966	
2nd place, silver medalist(s)	Xénia Krizsán	Hungary	5957	PB
3rd place, bronze medalist(s)	Tamara de Sousa	Brazil	5900	AJ
4	Sofia Linde	Sweden	5872	PB
5	Portia Bing	New Zealand	5653	PB
6	Lucia Mokrášová	Slovakia	5610	PB
7	Qingling Wang	China	5598	
8	Kendell Williams	United States	5578	PB
9	Grete Šadeiko	Estonia	5517	SB
10	Yusleidys Mendieta	Cuba	5514	
11	Nadine Visser	Netherlands	5447	
12	Frida Thorsås	Norway	5429	
13	Erica Bougard	United States	5410	
14	Nafissatou Thiam	Belgium	5384	
15	Emma Buckett	Great Britain	5383	PB
16	Tania Mayer	Switzerland	5320	SB
17	Melissa-Maree Farrington	Australia	5300	PB
18	Georgia Ellenwood	Canada	5262	PB
19	Kristella Jurkatamm	Estonia	5188	
20	Henna Palosaari	Finland	5101	
21	Katy Marchant	Great Britain	5046	
22	Nataliya Bashly	Ukraine	4948	
23	Maria Run Gunnlaugsdóttir	Iceland	4929	
24	Patricia Ortega	Spain	4876	
	Jutta Heikkinen	Finland	DNF	
	Laura Arteil	France	DNF	
	Ivona Dadic	Austria	DNF	
	Kateryna Tabashnyk	Ukraine	DNF	
	Elodie Jakob	Switzerland	DNF	
	Anouk Vetter	Netherlands	DNF	

== Participation ==
According to an unofficial count, 30 athletes from 22 countries participated in the event.

- Australia (1)
- Austria (1)
- Belgium (1)
- Brazil (1)
- Canada (1)
- China (1)
- Cuba (2)
- Estonia (2)
- Finland (2)
- France (1)
- Hungary (1)
- Iceland (1)
- Netherlands (2)
- New Zealand (1)
- Norway (1)
- Slovakia (1)
- Spain (1)
- Sweden (1)
- Switzerland (2)
- Ukraine (2)
- United Kingdom (2)
- United States (2)
