= Anouk Vetter =

Dutch track and field athlete (born 1993)

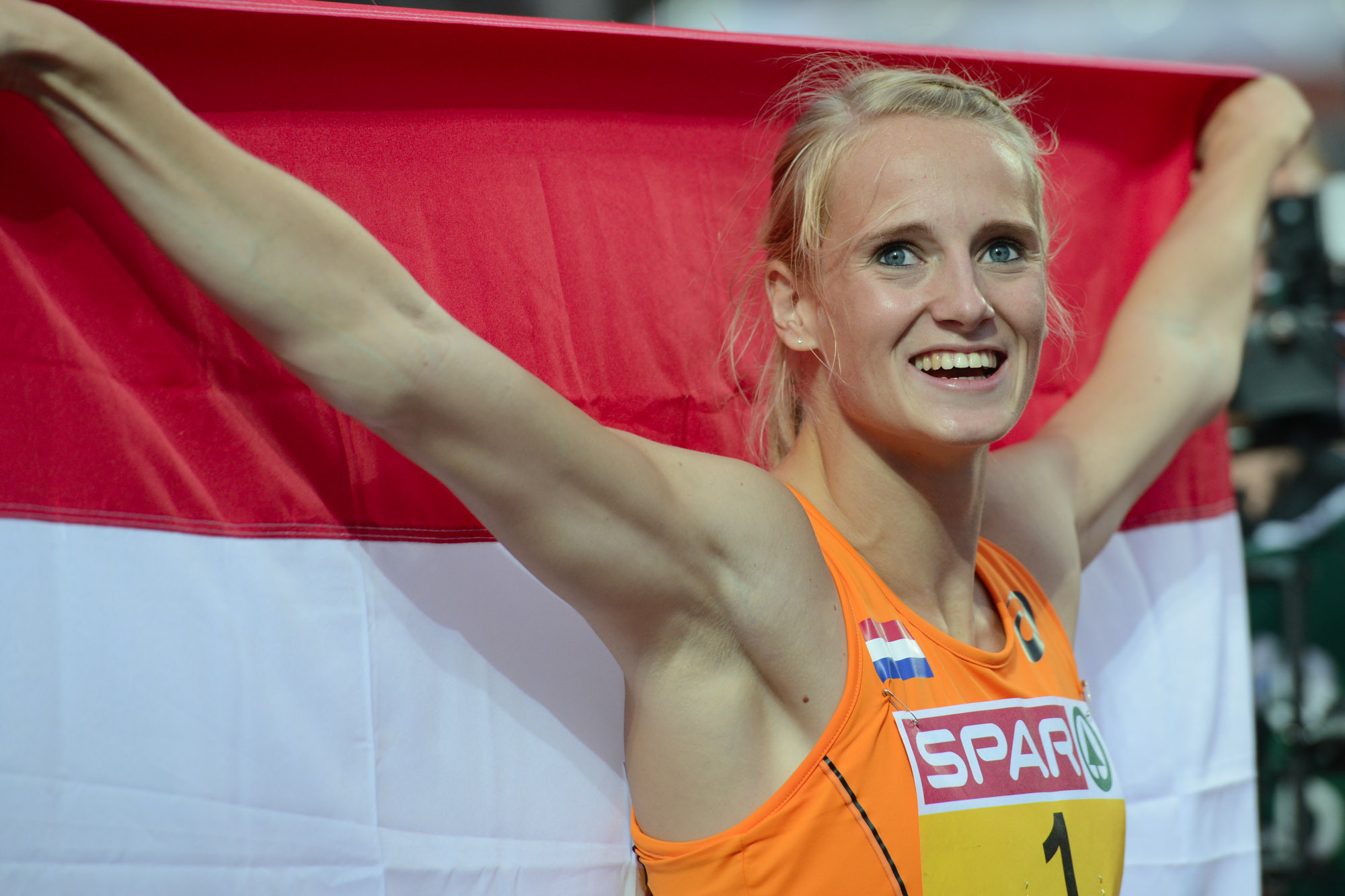
- Vetter at the 2016 European Athletics Championships in Amsterdam

Personal information
- Born: 4 February 1993 (age 33) Amsterdam, Netherlands
- Height: 1.77 m (5 ft 10 in)
- Weight: 65 kg (143 lb)
- Website: www.anoukvetter.nl

Sport
- Country: Netherlands
- Sport: Athletics
- Event(s): Heptathlon, Pentathlon
- Club: AV Sprint
Medal record
Women's athletics
Representing the Netherlands
Olympic Games
Silver medal – second place	2020 Tokyo	Heptathlon
World Championships
Silver medal – second place	2022 Eugene	Heptathlon
Bronze medal – third place	2017 London	Heptathlon
Bronze medal – third place	2023 Budapest	Heptathlon
European Championships
Gold medal – first place	2016 Amsterdam	Heptathlon

Anouk Vetter (Dutch pronunciation: [aːˈnuk ˈfɛtər]; born 4 February 1993) is a retired Dutch track and field athlete who competes in the combined events.

She won the silver medal in the heptathlon at the 2020 Tokyo Olympics. Vetter claimed bronze and silver in the event at the 2017 and 2022 World Athletics Championships respectively. She took the gold medal at the 2016 European Championships.

She is the Dutch record holder for the heptathlon with a score 6867 points, and won eight national titles (mostly for the long jump).

== Early life ==
Anouk Vetter was on born 4 February 1993 in Amsterdam in the Netherlands.

Vetter was exposed to athletics at a very young age. Her father, Ronald Vetter, is a long-standing athletics coach and her mother, Gerda Vetter-Blokziel a two-time Dutch javelin champion. "I grew up on the track, running around from the age of four and five playing on the high jump mat," she recalls.

== Career ==
Her passion became the heptathlon. However, her frail body was susceptible to injury. She failed to finish a heptathlon at either the 2011 European Athletics Junior Championships, 2012 World Junior Championships in Athletics and the 2013 European Athletics U23 Championships. After replacing her coach in 2012 with her father, she decreased her training to 80 per cent compared to the other women in the combined event group to protect her fragile body. She won the Multistars Firenze Trofeo Zerneri Acciai, the opening meeting of the 2013 IAAF Combined Events Challenge with 5872 points.

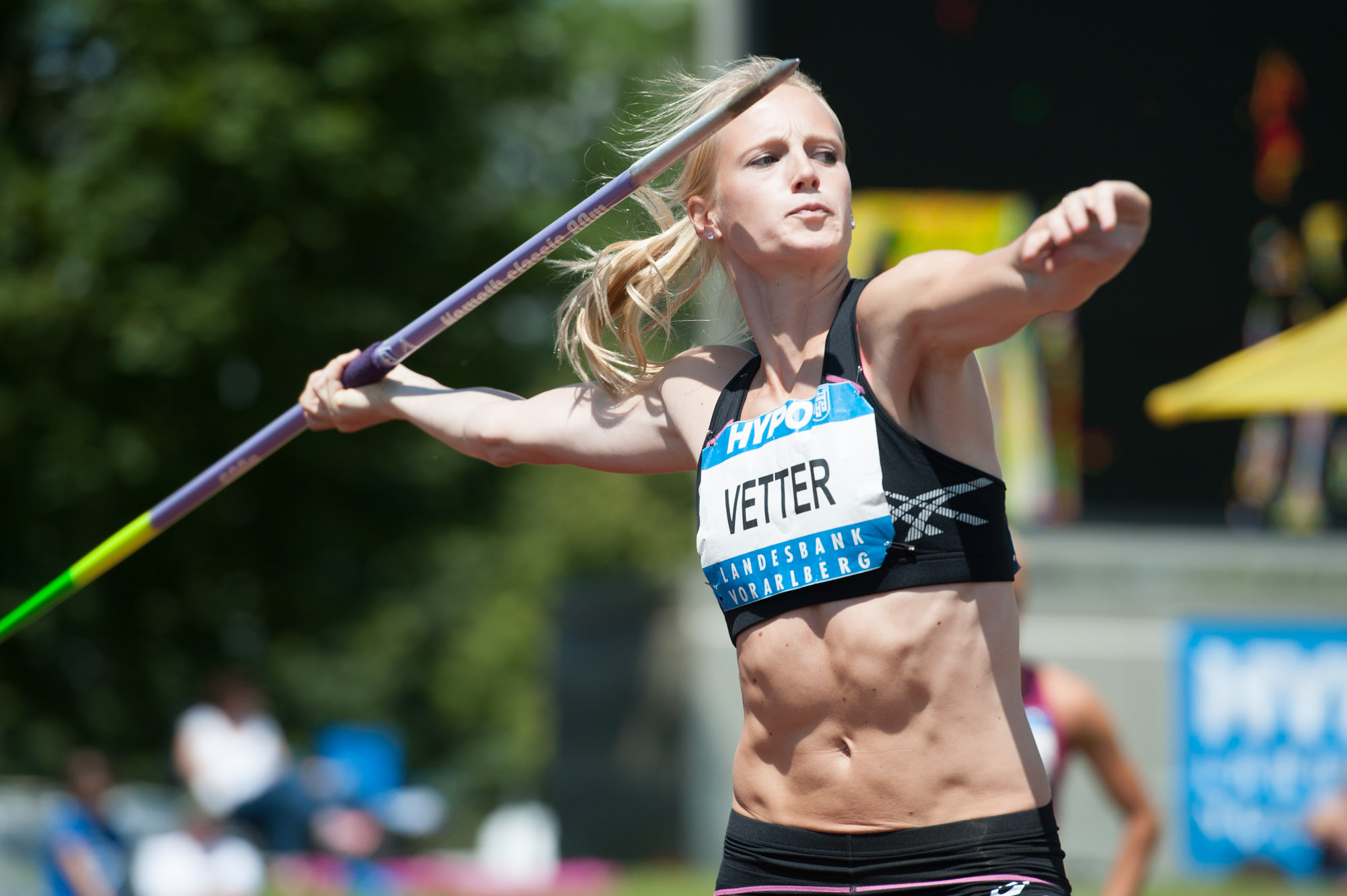
Vetter in action at the 2014 Hypo-Meeting in Götzis, Austria.

Her breakthrough came in 2014 when she improved her previous personal best by a massive 444 points to 6316 points at that year's prestigious Hypo-Meeting in Götzis, Austria to place ninth. "Gotzis was really special," she remembered. "It is always fantastic to compete there because the crowd is so close to the track." Later that year she finished seventh at the Zürich European Championships.

In 2015, Vetter finished sixth at the Hypo-Meeting with a new personal best with 6458 points, and won the heptathlon at the Mehrkampf-Meeting in Ratingen, Germany. Despite an injury, she also competed in the heptathlon event at the 2015 World Championships in Athletics in Beijing, where she reached the 12th place with 6267 points. "Bearing in mind I didn’t think I could even start the competition, mentally it was a really big step for me," she reflected later.

=== European champion ===
She started the 2016 season with an eighth place at the Hypo-Meeting. In July, Vetter took a surprise victory at the European Championships heptathlon in her home town Amsterdam, with a score of 6626 points, an improvement of the national record of Dafne Schippers. "To win that European title was amazing," she remembered. "Suddenly I was out of the shadow of the big girls." At the 2016 Rio Olympics, however, she finished on a disappointing 10th place.

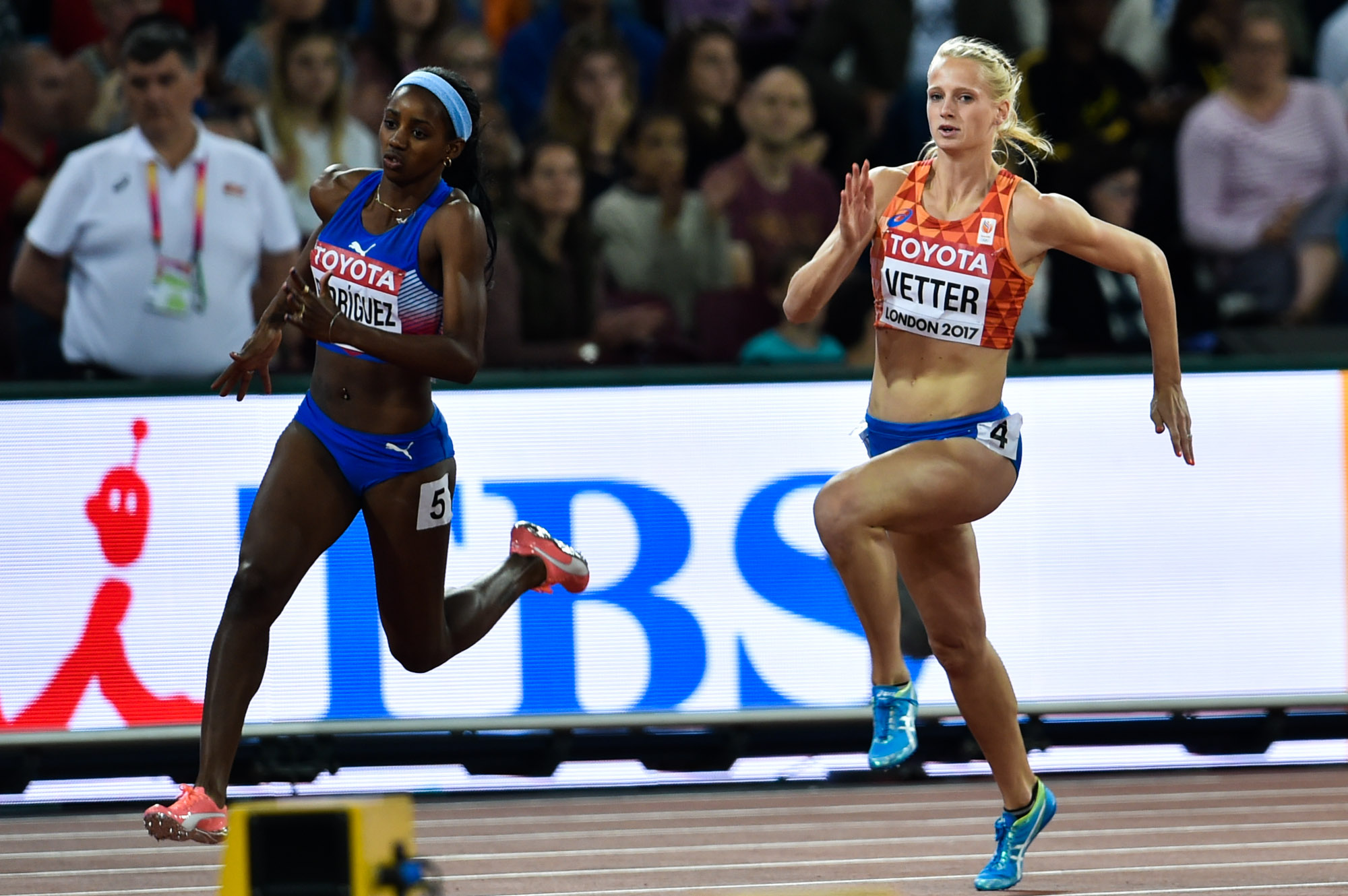
Vetter (R) races the heptathlon 800 m at the 2017 World Championships in Athletics held in London.

She started the 2017 outdoor season with a seventh place in Götzis. In August 2017, Vetter set a new national heptathlon record of 6636 points at the World Championships in London, where she won the bronze medal, behind 2016 Olympic champion Nafissatou Thiam (gold) and Carolin Schäfer (silver). She concluded the season with a win at the heptathlon at the Décastar in Talence, France. For the second year in a row she finished second in the IAAF Combined Events Challenge.

At the 2018 Hypo-Meeting in Götzis, Vetter finished fourth behind Nafissatou Thiam, Yorgelis Rodriguez and Erica Bougard. At the European Championships in Berlin she finished fifth place. The year 2019 was a difficult period in her career, due to injuries and doubts with the sport. She did not finish the combined events competitions at the European Indoor Championships in Glasgow, the Decastar in Talence and the World Championships in Doha. Depressed she did not start at the final event, the 800 meters. "I had physical injuries with my knee," she later explained. "But it was more than that. I was putting too much pressure on myself. I had a hard time enjoying athletics, and I had a battle inside my head."

=== Come back ===
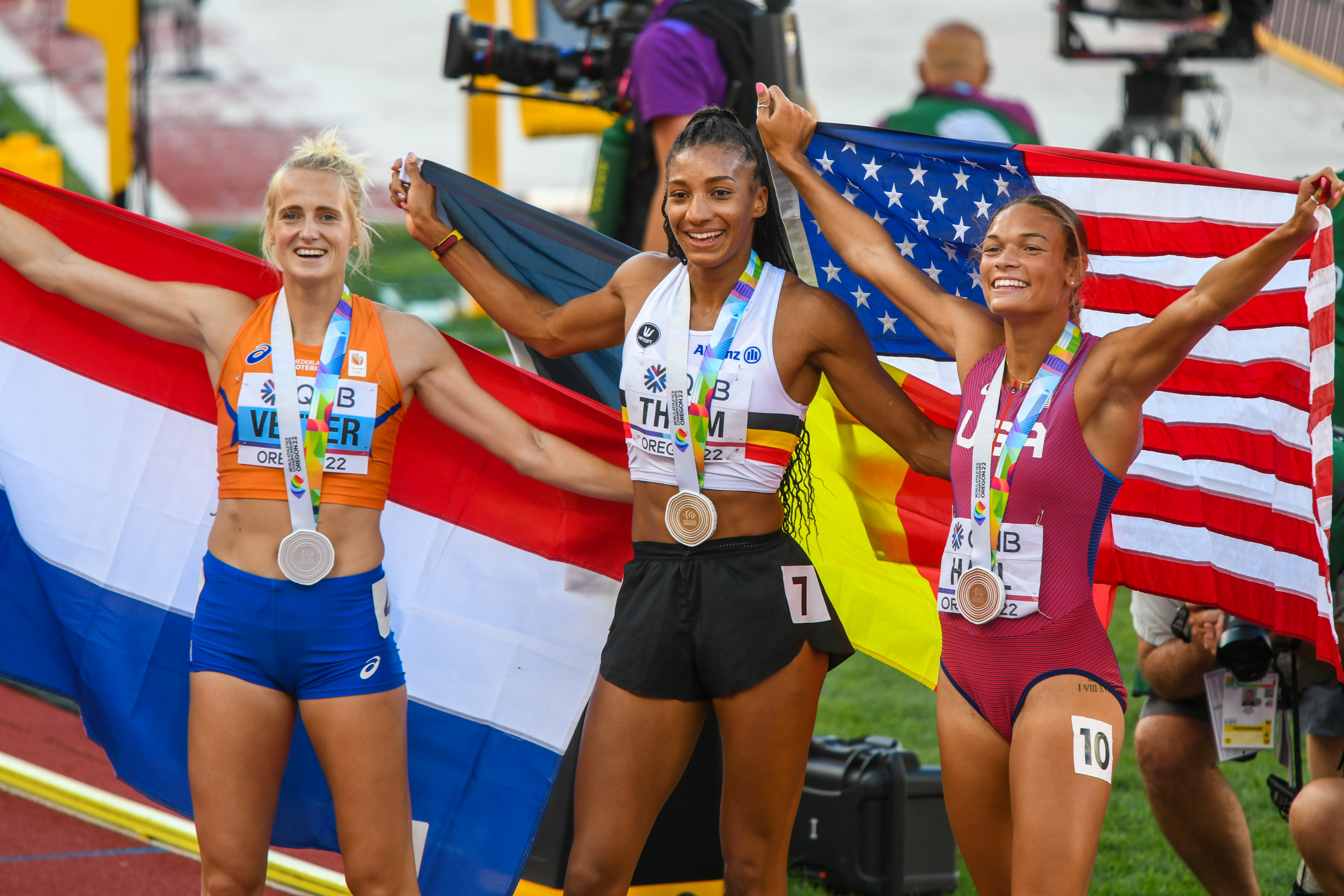
Hepthathlon world medallists at Oregon 2022 (L–R): Anouk Vetter (6867 pts), Nafi Thiam (6947 pts) and Anna Hall (6755 pts).

In 2021, Vetter made her come back winning the silver medal at the postponed 2020 Tokyo Olympics in Japan, with a new national record, behind Nafissatou Thiam who successfully defended her 2016 Olympic title. She led through the first day before Thiam and after world champion Katarina Johnson-Thompson had to leave the competition due to an injury.

In May 2022, she won the Hypo-Meeting in Götzis with a new national record after setting a meet record in the javelin throw of 59.81 m. Later that year, she won silver at the World Championships in Eugene (USA) with yet another national record. She led the contest until the last event, when Thiam surpassed her. In August at the Munich European Championships she had to withdraw from the competition due to an Achilles tendon injury.

== Statistics ==
=== International competitions ===
Representing the Netherlands
Year	Competition	Venue	Position	Event	Result
2009	European Youth Olympic Festival	Tampere, Finland	– (f)	4 × 100 m relay	DNF
2009	European Youth Olympic Festival	Tampere, Finland	– (f)	Javelin throw	DNS
2011	European Junior Championships	Tallinn, Estonia	–	Heptathlon	DNF
2012	World Junior Championships	Barcelona, Spain	–	Heptathlon	DNF
2013	European U23 Championships	Tampere, Finland	–	Heptathlon	DNF
2014	European Championships	Zürich, Switzerland	7th	Heptathlon	6281 pts
2015	European Indoor Championships	Prague, Czech Republic	8th	Pentathlon	4548 pts
2015	World Championships	Beijing, China	12th	Heptathlon	6267 pts
2016	European Championships	Amsterdam, Netherlands	1st	Heptathlon	6626 pts NR
2016	Olympic Games	Rio de Janeiro, Brazil	10th	Heptathlon	6394 pts
2017	World Championships	London, United Kingdom	3rd	Heptathlon	6636 pts NR
2018	European Championships	Berlin, Germany	5th	Heptathlon	6414 pts
2019	European Indoor Championships	Glasgow, United Kingdom	–	Pentathlon	DNF
2019	World Championships	Doha, Qatar	–	Heptathlon	DNF
2021	Olympic Games	Tokyo, Japan	2nd	Heptathlon	6689 pts NR
2022	World Championships	Eugene, OR, United States	2nd	Heptathlon	6867 pts NR
2022	European Championships	Munich, Germany	–	Heptathlon	DNF
2023	World Championships	Budapest, Hungary	3rd	Heptathlon	6501 pts
2024	Olympic Games	Paris, France	–	Heptathlon	DNF

==== Detailed heptathlon scores ====
Key: Current lifetime best

Competition	100 m hurdles	High jump	Shot put	200 metres	Long jump	Javelin throw	800 metres	Heptathlon
2014 Hypo-Meeting	13.56 PB	1.78 m	14.63 m PB	23.91 PB	5.90 m	52.18 m	2:23.53	6316 pts PB
2014 European Championships	13.68	1.79 m	14.16 m	24.61	6.04 m	52.49 m	2:22.27 PB	6281 pts
2015 Hypo-Meeting	13.53 PB	1.77 m	15.41 m PB	23.82 PB	6.21 m	50.09 m	2:21.18	6458 pts PB
2015 Erdgas Mehrkampf-Meeting	13.55	1.72 m	15.50 m PB	24.12	6.07 m	52.75 m	2:20.38 PB	6387 pts
2015 World Championships	13.61	1.77 m	14.24 m	24.53	6.11 m	51.78 m	2:23.71	6267 pts
2016 Hypo-Meeting	13.36	1.71 m	15.05 m	23.70 PB	6.15 m	45.30 m	2:21.39	6282 pts
2016 European Championships	13.29 PB	1.74 m	15.69 m PB	23.89	6.38 m w	55.76 m PB	2:21.50	6626 pts NR
2016 Olympic Games	13.47	1.77 m	14.78 m	23.93	6.10 m	48.42 m	2:17.71 PB	6394 pts
2017 Hypo-Meeting	13.32	1.71 m	15.54 m	24.21	6.19 m	55.43 m	2:20.20	6497 pts
2017 World Championships	13.31	1.77 m	15.09 m	24.36	6.32 m	58.41 m PB	2:19.43	6636 pts NR
2017 Décastar-meeting	13.60	1.73 m	14.86 m	24.21	6.18 m	52.49 m	2:20.99	6363 pts
2018 Hypo-Meeting	13.46	1.71 m	15.91 m	23.89	6.25 m	51.27 m	2:23.41	6426 pts
2018 European Championships	13.55	1.76 m	14.79 m	23.97	6.30 m	51.25 m	2:22.84	6414 pts
2019 Décastar-meeting	13.59	1.72 m	15.29 m	24.35	6.15 m	—N/a	—N/a	—N/a
2019 World Championships	13.55	1.74 m	14.10 m	24.43	6.20 m	54.17 m	—N/a	—N/a
2021 Hypo-Meeting	13.35	1.74 m	15.28 m	23.65 PB	6.23 m	54.77 m	2:22.33	6536 pts
2021 Olympic Games	13.09 PB	1.80 m	15.29 m	23.81	6.47 m	51.20 m	2:18.72	6689 pts NR
2022 Hypo-Meeting	13.28	1.74 m	14.88 m	23.76	6.47 m	59.81 m PB	2:21.56	6693 pts
2022 World Championships	13.30	1.80 m	16.25 m PB	23.73	6.52 m PB	58.29 m	2:20.09	6867 pts NR
2022 European Championships	13.37	1.71 m	15.68 m	24.00	6.27 m	—N/a	—N/a	—N/a
2023 Hypo-Meeting	13.29	1.71 m	14.88 m	23.71	—N/a	—N/a	—N/a	—N/a
2023 World Championships	13.42	1.71 m	15.72 m	24.28	5.99 m	59.57 m	2:20.49	6501 pts
2024 Hypo-Meeting	13.64	1.74 m	15.37 m	23.73	6.47 m	57.91 m	2:21.37	6642 pts
2024 Olympic Games	13.49	1.74 m	15.07 m	24.36	6.12 m	—N/a	—N/a	—N/a

=== Personal bests ===
Outdoor
Event	Performance	Points	Venue	Date	Notes
100 m hurdles	13.09 s (w. -0.8)	1111	Tokyo, Japan	4 August 2021	
High jump	1.81 m	991	Tampere, Finland	13 July 2013	
Shot put	16.25 m	945	Eugene, OR, United States	17 July 2022	
200 metres	23.65 s (w. +0.5)	1015	Götzis, Austria	29 May 2021	
Long jump	6.52 m (w. +0.3)	1014	Eugene, OR, United States	18 July 2022	
Javelin throw	59.81 m	1051	Götzis, Austria	29 May 2022	
800 metres	2:17.71 min	855	Rio de Janeiro, Brazil	13 August 2016	
Heptathlon	6867 pts	PB total: 6982	Eugene, OR, United States	18 July 2022	NR
100 metres	11.61 s (w. +0.9)	—N/a	Mannheim, Germany	9 June 2016	

Indoor
Event	Performance	Points	Venue	Date	Notes
60 m hurdles	8.15 s	1095	Apeldoorn, Netherlands	27 February 2022	
High jump	1.77 m	941	Prague, Czech Republic	6 March 2015	
Shot put	15.45 m	891	Apeldoorn, Netherlands	27 February 2016	
Long jump	6.42 m	981	Apeldoorn, Netherlands	20 February 2021	
800 metres	2:24.48 min	764	Prague, Czech Republic	6 March 2015	
Pentathlon	4548 pts	PB total: 4672	Prague, Czech Republic	6 March 2015	
60 metres	7.46 s	—N/a	Amsterdam, Netherlands	6 February 2016	

=== Circuit wins ===
- World Athletics Combined Events Tour
  - 2013: Multistars
  - 2015: Mehrkampf-Meeting
  - 2017: Décastar
  - 2022: Hypo-Meeting (NR)

=== National titles ===
- Dutch Athletics Championships
  - Long jump: 2017, 2019, 2020, 2021
  - Javelin throw: 2019, 2025
- Dutch Indoor Athletics Championships
  - Long jump: 2016, 2021, 2022
