= Meeting Arona Pruebas Combinadas =

Annual combined events athletics competition in Arona, Tenerife, Spain

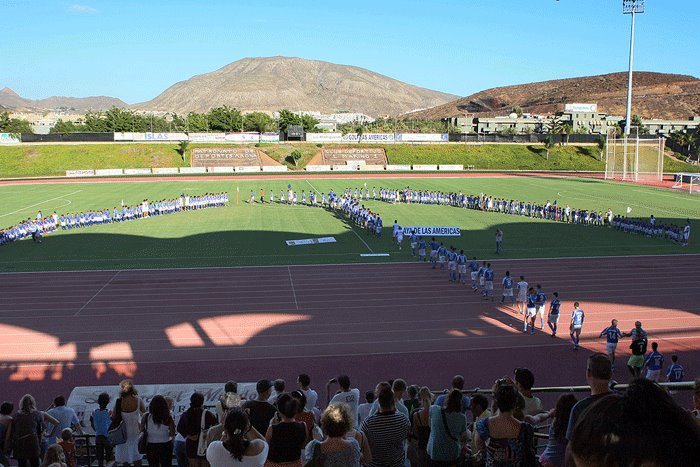
- Estadio Antonio Domínguez Alfonso, where the event is held
- Location: Estadio Antonio Domínguez Alfonso; Arona, Tenerife, Canary Islands, Spain
- Event type: Combined events
- World Athletics Cat.: A (World Athletics Combined Events Tour Gold)
- Distance: Decathlon; Heptathlon
- Established: 2011

The Meeting Arona Pruebas Combinadas, also known as the Meeting Internacional Arona-Tenerife, is an annual combined events competition held in Arona, Tenerife, Canary Islands, Spain. As of 2024, it is a World Athletics Combined Events Tour Gold level meeting – the highest-level circuit of international decathlon and heptathlon competitions.

== History ==
The meeting was founded in 2011, held in Estadio Antonio Domínguez Alfonso. It soon attracted high level international talent, including future decathlon world record-holder Kevin Mayer. In 2019, it was added to the IAAF Combined Events Challenge series. It is organized by the Royal Spanish Athletics Federation, and it is typically held in May or June.

== Winners ==
Meeting Arona Pruebas Combinadas winners
Ed.	Date	Cat.	Winner	Score	Winning marks													R
Ed.	Date	Cat.	Winner	Score	100 m	200 m	400 m	800 m	1500 m	100 m hurdles	110 m hurdles	Long jump	High jump	Pole vault	Shot put	Discus throw	Javelin throw	R
1st	14–15 May 2011	Men	Jonay Jordán (ESP)	7283 pts	11.12 (−0.5 m/s)	—N/a	50.06	—N/a	5:00.71	—N/a	14.77 (−2.0 m/s)	7.25 m (±0.0 m/s)	1.93 m	4.10 m	13.80 m	39.03 m	49.64 m	
1st	14–15 May 2011	Women	Estefanía Fortes (ESP)	5552 pts	—N/a	25.24 (±0.0 m/s)	—N/a	2:25.89	—N/a	14.14 (−0.7 m/s)	—N/a	5.79 m (+0.2 m/s)	1.58 m	—N/a	13.18 m	—N/a	44.10 m	
2nd	26–27 May 2012	Men	Daniel Awde (GBR)	8102 pts	10.87 (−1.1 m/s)	—N/a	47.14	—N/a	4:23.66	—N/a	14.44 (+0.5 m/s)	7.47 m (±0.0 m/s)	1.91 m	4.70 m	13.67 m	42.88 m	54.55 m	
2nd	26–27 May 2012	Women	Marisa De Aniceto (FRA)	6182 pts	—N/a	25.24 (±0.0 m/s)	—N/a	2:19.10	—N/a	13.81 (−0.3 m/s)	—N/a	6.10 m (±0.0 m/s)	1.80 m	—N/a	12.91 m	—N/a	51.92 m	
3rd	1–2 Jun 2013	Men	Niels Pittomvils (BEL)	7604 pts	11.36 (+0.3 m/s)	—N/a	50.58	—N/a	4:34.30	—N/a	15.25 (−2.1 m/s)	6.87 m (+1.1 m/s)	1.99 m	4.75 m	13.45 m	41.07 m	57.83 m	
3rd	1–2 Jun 2013	Women	Jo Rowland (GBR)	5702 pts	—N/a	24.85 (±0.0 m/s)	—N/a	2:17.27	—N/a	14.59 (−1.5 m/s)	—N/a	5.82 m (−0.4 m/s)	1.67 m	—N/a	13.38 m	—N/a	40.53 m	
4th	24–25 May 2014	Men	Florian Geffrouais (ESP)	7967 pts	11.17 (−0.2 m/s)	—N/a	49.85	—N/a	4:21.88	—N/a	15.13 (±0.0 m/s)	7.00 m (−0.8 m/s)	1.92 m	4.60 m	15.63 m	45.30 m	61.00 m	
4th	24–25 May 2014	Women	Marisa De Aniceto (FRA)	5914 pts	—N/a	25.80 (±0.0 m/s)	—N/a	2:23.61	—N/a	14.13 (−0.5 m/s)	—N/a	5.95 m (−1.1 m/s)	1.77 m	—N/a	12.90 m	—N/a	50.39 m	
5th	6–7 Jun 2015	Men	Kevin Mayer (FRA)	8469 pts	11.12 (+1.1 m/s)	—N/a	48.91	—N/a	4:29.59	—N/a	14.44 (−2.0 m/s)	7.42 m (+0.7 m/s)	1.98 m	5.35 m	15.33 m	45.83 m	63.46 m	
5th	6–7 Jun 2015	Women	Vanessa Spínola (BRA)	6103 pts	—N/a	24.02 (+0.8 m/s)	—N/a	2:12.52	—N/a	14.37 (−0.8 m/s)	—N/a	6.03 m (+1.6 m/s)	1.73 m	—N/a	13.82 m	—N/a	43.64 m	
6th	4–5 Jun 2016	Men	Kristjan Rosenberg (EST)	7907 pts	11.19 (−0.4 m/s)	—N/a	50.07	—N/a	4:35.72	—N/a	15.27 (±0.0 m/s)	7.42 m (±0.0 m/s)	2.11 m	4.82 m	13.73 m	39.44 m	58.19 m	
6th	4–5 Jun 2016	Women	Uhunoma Osazuwa (POR)	5921 pts	—N/a	24.31 (−2.7 m/s)	—N/a	2:19.71	—N/a	13.55 (−0.3 m/s)	—N/a	6.29 m (+0.8 m/s)	1.71 m	—N/a	12.91 m	—N/a	35.02 m	
7th	3–4 Jun 2017	Men	Taavi Tšernjavski (EST)	7802 pts	11.16 (+1.0 m/s)	—N/a	49.31	—N/a	4:32.25	—N/a	14.92 (+0.5 m/s)	7.01 m (+0.8 m/s)	1.91 m	4.60 m	13.57 m	38.30 m	61.02 m	
7th	3–4 Jun 2017	Women	Marisa Carvalho (POR)	5755 pts	—N/a	24.61 (+0.4 m/s)	—N/a	2:17.97	—N/a	13.66 (−0.3 m/s)	—N/a	6.13 m (+1.3 m/s)	1.64 m	—N/a	12.89 m	—N/a	34.44 m	
8th	2–3 Jun 2018	Men	Pablo Trescoli (ESP)	7378 pts	11.26 (+0.9 m/s)	—N/a	50.26	—N/a	4:27.55	—N/a	14.64 (+1.5 m/s)	7.16 m (+1.5 m/s)	1.94 m	4.45 m	13.25 m	38.30 m	41.06 m	
8th	2–3 Jun 2018	Women	Lecabela Quaresma (POR)	5901 pts	—N/a	25.72 (±0.0 m/s)	—N/a	2:11.93	—N/a	13.83 (+2.1 m/s)	—N/a	5.83 m (±0.0 m/s)	1.73 m	—N/a	13.64 m	—N/a	40.65 m	
9th	8–9 Jun 2019	Men	Martin Roe (NOR)	8037 pts	11.13 (−1.5 m/s)	—N/a	49.90	—N/a	4:31.96	—N/a	15.03 (±0.0 m/s)	7.38 m (±0.0 m/s)	1.93 m	4.70 m	14.88 m	46.27 m	62.08 m	
9th	8–9 Jun 2019	Women	Verena Preiner (AUT)	6472 pts	—N/a	24.21 (+0.3 m/s)	—N/a	2:08.83	—N/a	13.66 (−0.3 m/s)	—N/a	6.34 m (±0.0 m/s)	1.76 m	—N/a	13.86 m	—N/a	48.76 m	
10th	12–13 Jun 2021	Men	Jiří Sýkora (CZE)	8122 pts	10.97 (+1.8 m/s)	—N/a	49.43	—N/a	4:51.42	—N/a	14.53 (±0.0 m/s)	7.30 m (+1.9 m/s)	1.75 m	4.80 m	14.00 m	48.86 m	66.91 m	
10th	12–13 Jun 2021	Women	Nina Schultz (CHN)	6358 pts	—N/a	24.51 (+0.8 m/s)	—N/a	2:14.49	—N/a	13.39 (+1.1 m/s)	—N/a	6.23 m (±0.0 m/s)	1.76 m	—N/a	13.86 m	—N/a	48.26 m	
11th	4–5 Jun 2022	Men	Marcus Nilsson (SWE)	8115 pts	11.43 (+0.2 m/s)	—N/a	50.47	—N/a	4:19.83	—N/a	14.73 (+0.4 m/s)	6.83 m (+0.1 m/s)	1.98 m	5.10 m	15.37 m	47.61 m	59.28 m	
11th	4–5 Jun 2022	Women	Chari Hawkins (USA)	6243 pts	—N/a	24.69 (−0.8 m/s)	—N/a	2:16.66	—N/a	13.30 (+0.2 m/s)	—N/a	5.98 m (+0.2 m/s)	1.85 m	—N/a	13.67 m	—N/a	42.88 m	
12th	17–18 Jun 2023	Men	Andreu Boix (ESP)	7961 pts	10.93 (+1.5 m/s)	—N/a	47.34	—N/a	4:27.21	—N/a	14.35 (+0.8 m/s)	7.36 m (+1.4 m/s)	1.99 m	4.60 m	13.40 m	40.37 m	50.97 m	
12th	17–18 Jun 2023	Women	Sofia Cosculluela (ESP)	5840 pts	—N/a	24.57 (−2.0 m/s)	—N/a	2:23.39	—N/a	13.60 (+0.5 m/s)	—N/a	6.46 m (+1.6 m/s)	1.61 m	—N/a	12.62 m	—N/a	39.40 m	
13th	11–12 May 2024	Men	Malik Diakite (GER)	8037 pts	11.09 (±0.0 m/s)	—N/a	49.00	—N/a	4:16.86	—N/a	14.96 (+1.6 m/s)	7.42 m (+2.4 m/s)	1.88 m	4.70 m	14.12 m	42.74 m	61.58 m	
13th	11–12 May 2024	Women	Elisa Pineau (FRA)	6020 pts	—N/a	25.00 (−0.9 m/s)	—N/a	2:21.27	—N/a	13.94 (+1.5 m/s)	—N/a	6.15 m (+1.3 m/s)	1.72 m	—N/a	14.19 m	—N/a	44.71 m	
14th	21–22 June 2025	Men	Antoine Ferranti (FRA)	8221 pts	11.15 (+2.1 m/s)	—N/a	48.76	—N/a	4:20.25	—N/a	14.51 (+2.0 m/s)	7.27 (−0.6 m/s)	2.09 m	5.00 m	14.11 m	40.33 m	58.82 m	
14th	21–22 June 2025	Women	Lovisa Karlsson (SWE)	6061 pts	—N/a	24.57 (+0.6 m/s)	—N/a	2:17.26	—N/a	13.40 (+0.6 m/s)	—N/a	6.45 m (±0.0 m/s)	1.69 m	—N/a	12.89 m	—N/a	39.38 m	
15th	6-7 June 2026	Men	Antoine Ferranti (FRA)	8240 pts	11.13 (±0.0 m/s)	—N/a	48.25	—N/a	4:14.44	—N/a	14.61 (+0.3 m/s)	7.46 m (+1.1 m/s)	2.12 m	4.90 m	13.66 m	41.06 m	54.14 m	
15th	6-7 June 2026	Women	Anna-Elisabeth Ehlers (GER)	6216 pts	—N/a	24.45 (−1.2 m/s)	—N/a	2:13.91	—N/a	14.05 (+1.3 m/s)	—N/a	6.51 m (+2.7 m/s)	1.86 m	—N/a	13.22 m	—N/a	36.10 m	
