= Estadio Antonio Domínguez Alfonso =

Multi-use sports venue on the island of Tenerife in the Canary Islands

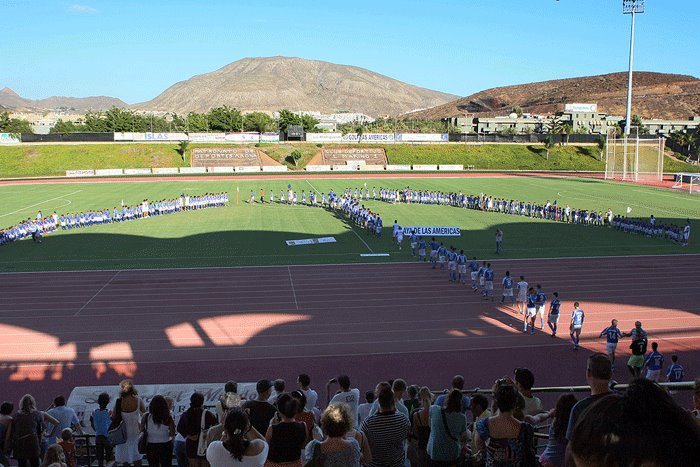

- Location in Playa de las Américas
- Full name: Estadio Olímpico Municipal Antonio Domínguez Alfonso
- Location: Playa de las Américas, Arona, Spain
- Coordinates: 28°03′35″N 16°43′34″W
- Owner: Ayuntamiento Arona
- Capacity: 7,500 (sports); 27,000 (concerts)
- Field size: 100 m × 70 m (330 ft × 230 ft)

Construction
- Built: 1969
- Opened: 7 September 1969
- Renovated: Various

Tenant
- CD Marino (1969-present)

Estadio Olímpico Municipal Antonio Domínguez Alfonso, otherwise simply known as Estadio Antonio Domínguez Alfonso, is a multi-purpose stadium located in Playa de Las Américas, Arona, Tenerife, Canary Islands, Spain. It is the home ground of Tercera División RFEF (Group 12) side CD Marino. It has a capacity of 7,500 for sporting events, whilst being able to accommodate a capacity of 27,000 for concerts. It has dimensions of 100 x 70 metres.

== History ==
Constructed in 1969 and opened on 7 September 1969, the stadium is named after Spanish politician Antonio Domínguez Alfonso, who was born in Arona in 1848. Prior to the installation of an artificial grass pitch in 2001, the pitch was composed of dirt.

On 24 November 1998, the Campo Municipal de Fútbol Anexo Antonio Domínguez, otherwise simply known as Anexo Estadio Antonio Domínguez, opened. The 1,000 capacity stadium, which is adjacent to its counterpart stadium, hosts CD Marino B amongst a range of other football teams that make use of the stadium. In 2015, a FIFA Quality Pro artificial pitch was installed at the annex at the cost of €129,000, giving the stadium an artificial playing field of professional standard.

In August 2011, the stadium played host to the inaugural year of the Arona Summer Festival, an electronic music festival that was headlined by one of the biggest names in dance music, French DJ and producer David Guetta.

On 25 October 2021, the Royal Spanish Athletics Federation (RFEA) announced that the stadium had been selected to host the 2022 Spanish Masters Athletics Championships, which will see more than 1,500 participants aged 35 and over compete in athletics events. Days prior to the announcement, the council unveiled its plans for an €715,000 upgrade of the stadium, which will see the construction of medical treatment and rehabilitation facilities as well as additional changing rooms and office space. The council estimates the stadium contributes at least €1 million per year to the economy through hotel bookings alone.

Due to its climate, the stadium is often utilised by football teams during pre-season breaks as well as elite athletes who use the venue to train for upcoming events, with double 2022 Tokyo Olympics gold medalist Marcell Jacobs being one of many in most recent times.

== Other uses ==
The stadium also hosts non-football events such as concerts, athletics and other sports.

=== Athletics ===
The stadium is the host of the Meeting Arona Pruebas Combinadas, an annual combined events international competition.

=== Concerts ===
The stadium is a space for concerts, being able to accommodate in the region of 27,000 spectators for such events. Notable performances include Puerto Rican singer and musician Ricky Martin, Marc Anthony, Malú, Pablo Alborán, Jorge Drexler and Carlos Vives.

==== Arona Summer Festival ====
One of the largest non-football events hosted by the stadium is the Arona Summer Festival, an electronic music festival held in collaboration with the Ministry of Sound. In the first year of the festival in August 2011, the festival was headlined by David Guetta, with performances from Roger Sanchez, Rinôçérôse and The Zombie Kids.

The second year of the festival, held in August 2012, was headlined by Avicii whilst it featured performances by Dimitri Vegas & Like Mike, Sean Paul and Nervo. The third edition of the festival was headlined by Swedish DJ Alesso, whilst Nervo and The Zombie Kids returned for their second performance at the festival. Other notable performers include Redfoo, of LMFAO and Michael Calfan.

In subsequent years, the festival has seen performances from Armin van Buuren, Brian Cross, Danny Ávila, Deadmau5, Deorro, Don Diablo, Guy Gerber, Julian Jordan, Kryder, Nicky Romero, Oliver Heldens, Otto Knows, Pendulum, Rudimental, Sander van Doorn, Showtek, Steve Angello, Steve Aoki, Tchami, Tom Staar and Ummet Ozcan.

== See also ==
- CD Marino
