= Oceania Combined Events Championships =

Intyernational athletics competition

- Sport: Combined event
- Founded: 2011
- Continent: Oceania (OAA)

The Oceania Combined Events Championships are an annual athletics competition organized by the Oceania Athletics Association (OAA) for athletes representing the countries of its member associations in men's decathlon and women's heptathlon. They were established in 2011. The 2013 edition was held alongside the 2013 Oceania Area Championships.

== Editions ==
	Year	City	Country	Date
I	2011	Townsville, Queensland	Australia	June 11–12
II	2012	Townsville, Queensland	Australia	May 5–6
III	2013	Papeete, Tahiti	French Polynesia	June 3–5
IV	2014	Melbourne, Victoria	Australia	April 3–4
V	2015	Cairns, Queensland	Australia	May 8–10

== Results ==
Results can be found on the OAA and on the Athletics Australia websites.

=== Men's Decathlon ===
Year	Gold		Silver		Bronze	
2011	Jarrod Sims; Australia	7045 pts	Lars Fa'apoi; Tonga	4483 pts	Vea Toutou'ofa; Tonga	4460 pts
2012	Nicholas Gerrard; New Zealand	6403 pts	Aaron Page; Australia	6010 pts	Lars Fa'apoi; Tonga	5412 pts
2013	Nicholas Gerrard; New Zealand	6807 pts	Andrew Hodges; Australia	6573 pts	Aaron Page; Australia	5861 pts
2014	Jake Stein; Australia	7564 pts	Stephen Cain; Australia	7493 pts	Kyle Cranston; Australia	7390 pts
2015	Brent Newdick; New Zealand	7140 pts	Aaron Booth; New Zealand	6183 pts	Alex Mander; New Zealand	5919 pts

=== Women's Heptathlon ===
Year	Gold		Silver		Bronze	
2011	Soko Salaniqiqi; Fiji	4283 pts	Breanna Hargrave; Australia	4147 pts	Eunice Steven; Papua New Guinea	3927 pts
2013	Elana Withnall; New Zealand	4348 pts	Mafi Mapa; Tonga	3000 pts	Ana Katiloka; Tonga	2625 pts
2014	Sophie Stanwell; Australia	5621 pts	Portia Bing; New Zealand	5504 pts	Ashleigh Hamilton; Australia	5347 pts
2015	Sarah Wood; Australia	5052 pts	Tori West; Australia	4841 pts	Merissa Colledge; Australia	4186 pts
