= Grete Griffin =

Estonian heptathlete

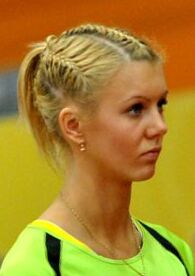
- Griffin in 2012

Personal information
- Born: 29 May 1993 (age 33) Türi, Estonia
- Height: 1.78 m (5 ft 10 in)
- Spouse: Robert Griffin III (m. 2018)
- Children: 3

Sport
- Sport: Heptathlon
- Club: KJK Järvala
- Coached by: Leonhard Soom

Achievements and titles
- Personal best: 5813 p

Grete Griffin (née Šadeiko; born 29 May 1993) is an Estonian heptathlete. At the 2010 World Junior Championships in Moncton, Canada, she placed fourth with her personal record 5705 points, just one point behind Helga Margrét Thorsteinsdóttir. In the fall of 2012, she joined Florida State University.

== Achievements ==
Year	Tournament	Venue	Points	Rank	Event
2010	World Junior Championships	Moncton, Canada	5705 pts PB	4th	Heptathlon
2012	World Junior Championships	Barcelona, Spain	5517 pts	9th	Hepthatlon
2015	European U23 Championships	Tallinn, Estonia	5813 pts PB	5th	Hepthatlon

== Personal bests ==
Event	Indoor	Outdoor
60 metres	7.77 s	
200 metres	25.40 s	24.52 s
800 metres	2:23.22 min	2:16.08 min
60 metres hurdles	8.60 s	
100 metres hurdles		13.92 s
High jump	1.74 m	1.76 m
Long jump	5.98 m	6.02 m (+1.3); 6.17 m (+2.4)
Shot put	12.16 m	12.61 m
Javelin throw		46.42 m
Pentathlon	4,105 p	
Heptathlon		5813 p

== Personal life ==
In August 2016, Šadeiko became romantically linked to NFL quarterback Robert Griffin III. Sadeiko and Griffin became engaged on 13 May 2017. Their first daughter was born on 2 July 2017. The couple married on 10 March 2018. Their second daughter was born in September 2019 and their third daughter was born in January 2023. Sadeiko has a stepdaughter through her marriage to Griffin.

Šadeiko's older sister Grit Šadeiko is also a heptathlete.
