= Ashley Bryant =

British decathlete

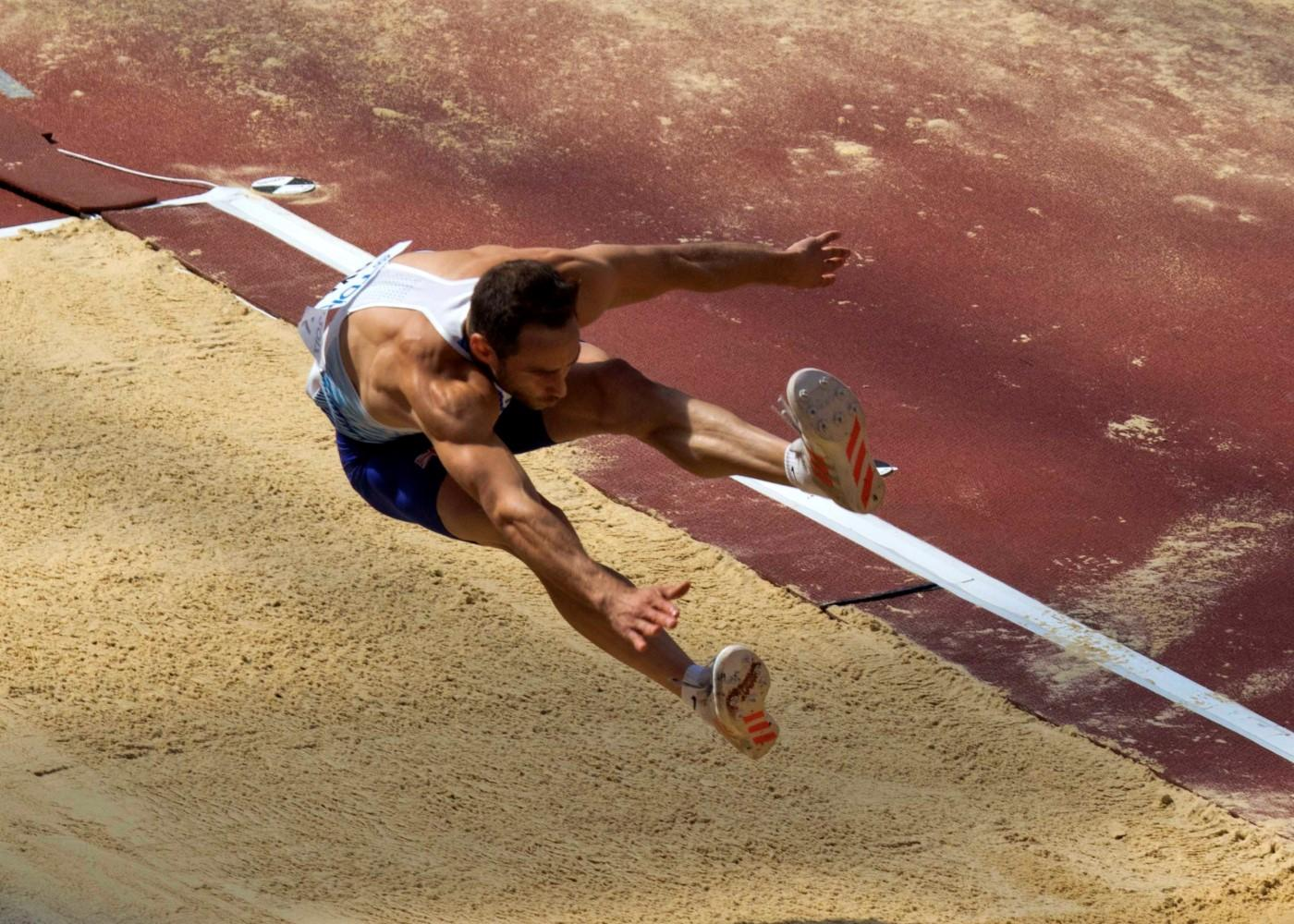

Personal information
- Nationality: British
- Born: 17 May 1991 (age 35) Hammersmith, London, England
- Height: 1.78 m (5 ft 10 in)
- Weight: 77 kg (170 lb)

Sport
- Country: Great Britain; England
- Sport: Athletics
- Event(s): Decathlon, heptathlon
- Club: Windsor, Slough, Eton and Hounslow Athletic Club
- Coached by: Aston Moore

Achievements and titles
- Personal best(s): Decathlon: 8,163; Heptathlon: 5,975
Medal record
Men's Athletics
Representing England
2014 Commonwealth Games
Silver medal – second place	2014 Glasgow	Decathlon

Ashley Bryant (born 17 May 1991) is a British athlete, specialising in the decathlon. He is a member of Windsor, Slough, Eton and Hounslow Athletic Club and is coached by Aston Moore. Bryant has represented Great Britain at the IAAF World Athletics Championships and England at the Commonwealth Games, a silver medallist in the latter.

== Career ==
=== 2010 ===
Bryant captained his country at the 2010 World Junior Championships in Athletics in Moncton, Canada.

=== 2011 ===
A European Cup 1st League bronze medallist in 2011, he went on to compete in the World Student Games in Shenzhen, China as a 20-year-old, placing fifth.

=== 2013 ===
In 2013, at the age of 22, Bryant was the best decathlete in the United Kingdom. He was ranked in the top ten for under-23s in the long jump and several other single events, and the top 20 among senior athletes. At the 2013 European Athletics U23 Championships, he came fourth and achieved his personal best of 8070 points. It was the first time in the history of these Championships that 8000 points did not place in the top three.

=== 2014 ===
He won a silver medal in the men's decathlon at the 2014 Commonwealth Games.

== Personal bests ==
Outdoor

As of 7 March 2018

Event	Performance	Location	Date
Decathlon	8,163	Götzis	28 May 2017
100 metres	11.02	Moncton	20 July 2010
400 metres	48.10	Florence	2 May 2013
1500 metres	4:27.15	London	12 August 2017
110 metres hurdles	14.31	Wormwood Scrubs	8 June 2013
High jump	2.01	Florence	29 April 2016
Pole vault	4.70	Glasgow	29 July 2014
Long jump	7.70	Götzis	27 May 2017
Shot put	14.34	Eton	19 April 2014
Discus throw	45.38	Woodford	5 April 2014
Javelin throw	70.44	Florence	3 May 2013

Indoor

As of 7 March 2018

Event	Performance	Location	Date
Heptathlon	5,975	Prague	29 January 2017
60 metres	7.06	Belgrade	4 March 2017
200 metres	22.44	Sheffield	16 February 2011
1000 metres	2:40.84	Prague	29 January 2017
60 metres hurdles	8.09	Birmingham	15 January 2017
High jump	2.05	Grand Rapids	20 February 2010
Pole vault	4.60	Sheffield	6 March 2011
Long jump	7.79	Prague	28 January 2017
Shot put	14.65	Sheffield	7 January 2017
