= Portia Bing =

New Zealand athlete (born 1993)

Personal information
- Born: 17 April 1993 (age 32) Helensville, New Zealand
- Height: 1.79 m (5 ft 10 in)
- Weight: 65 kg (143 lb)

Sport
- Sport: Track and field
- Event: Heptathlon

Portia Bing (born 17 April 1993 in Helensville) is a New Zealand athlete who specialises in the heptathlon. She competed at the 2015 World Championships in Athletics in Beijing, China, finishing 16th. Her heptathlon personal best is 6102 points, set in Brisbane in 2015.

== Competition record ==
Year	Competition	Venue	Position	Event	Notes
Representing New Zealand
2010	Oceania Youth Championships	Sydney, Australia	8th	High jump	1.60 m
2010	Oceania Youth Championships	Sydney, Australia	2nd	Long jump	5.81 m (w)
2010	Oceania Junior Championships	Cairns, Australia	2nd	100 m hurdles	14.88 s
2010	Oceania Junior Championships	Cairns, Australia	1st	4 × 100 m hurdles	49.18 s
2010	Oceania Junior Championships	Cairns, Australia	1st	Long jump	5.70 m (w)
2012	World Junior Championships	Barcelona, Spain	5th	Heptathlon	5653 pts
2014	Commonwealth Games	Glasgow, United Kingdom	10th (h)	4 × 400 m relay	3:34.62 min
2015	World Championships	Beijing, China	16th	Heptathlon	6057 pts
2019	World Championships	Doha, Qatar	–	400 m hurdles	DQ
2022	World Championships	Eugene, United States	20th (sf)	400 m hurdles	55.53
2023	World Championships	Budapest, Hungary	41st (h)	400 m hurdles	66.97

== Personal bests ==
Outdoor

Event	Performance	Location	Date
100 metres	11.94	Hamilton, New Zealand	21 March 2015
200 metres	23.85	Brisbane, Australia	10 January 2015
400 metres	53.38	Southport (Qld), Australia	28 June 2014
800 metres	2:12.47	Florence, Italy	30 April 2016
100 metres hurdles	13.59	Beijing, China	22 August 2015
400 metres hurdles	57.51	Melbourne, Australia	4 March 2018
High jump	1.80 m	Brisbane, Australia	10 January 2015
Long jump	6.21 m	Gold Coast, Australia	25 July 2015
Shot put	13.60 m	Beijing, China	22 August 2015
Javelin throw	43.87 m	Florence, Italy	30 April 2016
Heptathlon	6102	Brisbane, Australia	10–11 January 2015
