= Martin Roe =

Norwegian decathlon and heptathlon athlete

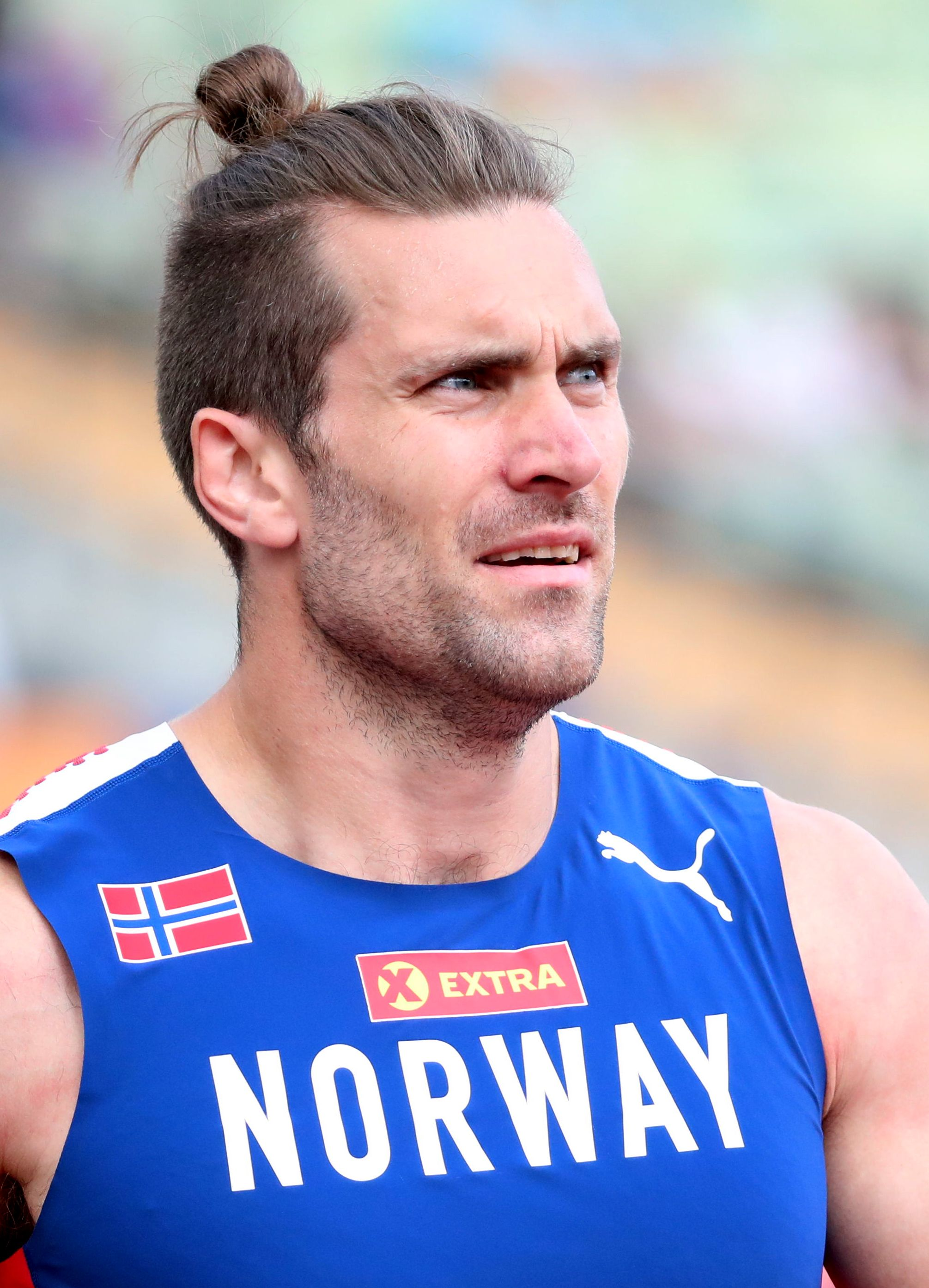
- Roe in 2022

Personal information
- Born: 1 April 1992 (age 34) Bergen, Norway
- Height: 1.87 m (6 ft 2 in)
- Weight: 86 kg (190 lb)

Sport
- Sport: Athletics
- Event: Decathlon
- Club: IL Fri
- Coached by: Ingunn Gatland Jacobsen

Martin Roe (born 1 April 1992) is a Norwegian athlete, specializing in combined events (decathlon and heptathlon). On 26 April 2018, he broke the Norwegian record with 8228 points, in the combined events meet in Firenze. In 2017, he won the men's heptathlon competition at the Norwegian Indoor Championships in Sandnes, Norway, with a new personal record of 5,690, beating six personal bests in the process. On 2 July, he achieved a new outdoor personal record of 8,144 points in the decathlon – his first time crossing the barrier of 8,000 points – to deliver a win for Norway at a European Combined Events Team Championships Second League event taking place in Monzón, Spain. In August, he represented his country at the 2017 World Championships, finishing twelfth with 8,040 points.

== Personal life ==
A native of Bergen, he has a younger sister, Matilde (born 1996), who is a shot put specialist. Their mother, Ingunn Gatland Jacobsen, is their coach.

== International competitions ==
Year	Competition	Venue	Position	Event	Notes
Representing Norway
2009	World Youth Championships	Brixen, Italy	11th	Octathlon	5730 pts
2010	World Junior Championships	Moncton, Canada	13th	Decathlon (junior)	7056 pts
2011	European Junior Championships	Tallinn, Estonia	7th	Decathlon (junior)	7618 pts
2013	European U23 Championships	Tampere, Finland	12th	Decathlon	7526 pts
2016	European Championships	Amsterdam, Netherlands	11th	Decathlon	7795 pts
2017	World Championships	London, United Kingdom	12th	Decathlon	8040 pts
2018	European Championships	Berlin, Germany	6th	Decathlon	8131 pts
2019	European Indoor Championships	Glasgow, United Kingdom	7th	Heptathlon	5951 pts
2019	World Championships	Doha, Qatar	18th	Decathlon	6845 pts
2021	Olympic Games	Tokyo, Japan	19th	Decathlon	7863 pts
2022	European Championships	Munich, Germany	14th	Decathlon	7754 pts

== Personal bests ==
=== Outdoor ===
As of 4 August 2021

Event	Performance	Location	Date	Virtual best performance
Decathlon	8,228 points	Florence, Italy	26 April 2018	8,332 points
100 metres	10.79 (-1.7 m/s)	Florence, Italy	1 July 2017	908 points
Long jump	7.50 m (24 ft 7 1/4 in) (-0.3 m/s)	Amsterdam, Netherlands	6 July 2016	935 points
Shot put	15.44 m (50 ft 7 3/4 in)	Monzón, Spain	1 July 2017	817 points
High jump	1.96 m (6 ft 5 in)	Kladno, Czech Republic/Tokyo, Japan	17 June 2017 – 4 August 2021	767 points
400 metres	49.00	Inowrocław, Poland	4 July 2015	861 points
110 metres hurdles	15.15	London, United Kingdom	12 August 2017	831 points
Discus throw	49.19 m (161 ft 4 1/2 in)	Monzón, Spain	2 July 2017	854 points
Pole vault	4.60 m (15 ft 1 in)	Askøy, Norway	30 July 2016	790 points
Javelin throw	66.72 m (218 ft 10 3/4 in)	Byrkjelo, Norway	14 August 2011	839 points
1500 metres	4:32.31	Tampere, Finland	12 July 2013	730 points
Personal bests in non-decathlon events
200 metres	21.98 (-0.5 m/s)	Bergen	2017	n.a.
Hammer throw	57.14 m (187 ft 5 1/2 in)	Bergen	3 June 2012	n.a.

Indoor

As of 19 February 2017

Event	Performance	Location	Date	Virtual best performance
Heptathlon	5,690 points	Sandnes, Norway	19 February 2017	5,693 points
60 metres	7.00	Sandnes, Norway	18 February 2017	882 points
Long jump	7.10 m (23 ft 3 1/2 in) (-0.3 m/s)	Sandnes, Norway	18 February 2017	838 points
Shot put	15.08 m (49 ft 5 1/2 in)	Sandnes, Norway	10 January 2015	795 points
High jump	1.98 m (6 ft 5 3/4 in)	Sandnes, Norway	18 February 2017	785 points
60 metres hurdles	8.50	Sandnes, Norway	19 February 2017	860 points
Pole vault	4.40 m (14 ft 5 in)	Sandnes, Norway	19 February 2017	731 points
1000 metres	2:46.51	Sandnes, Norway	19 February 2017	802 points
Personal bests in non-heptathlon events
200 metres	21.98	Malmö, Sweden	2014	n.a.
400 metres	50.19	Malmö, Sweden	2014	n.a.
