= Erica Bougard =

American heptathlete (born 1993)

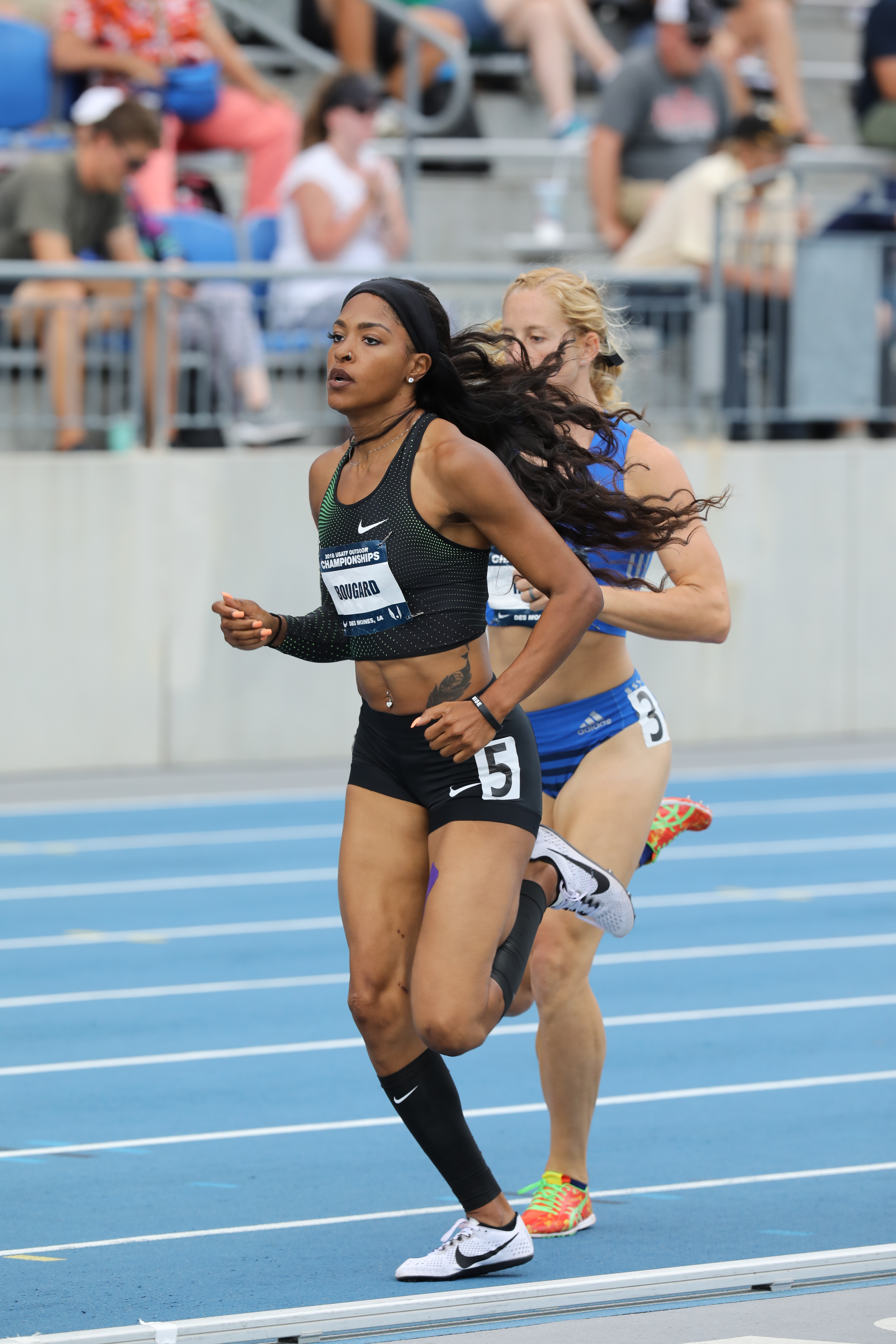
- Bougard at the 2018 USA Outdoor Track and Field Championships

Personal information
- Born: July 26, 1993 (age 32) Memphis, Tennessee, U.S.

Sport
- Country: United States
- Event: Heptathlon
- College team: Mississippi State Bulldogs

Achievements and titles
- Personal best(s): Heptathlon: 6557 (2017); Pentathlon: 4760Ai (2018)

Erica Marsha Bougard (born July 26, 1993) is an American heptathlete. She was NCAA indoor champion in 2013 and represented the United States at the 2013 World Championships.

== Biography ==
Erica Bougard was born in Memphis, Tennessee, but grew up in Byhalia, Mississippi. Her first sport was basketball; she took up track and field at Byhalia High School. Erica Bougard won 2011 Mississippi High School Activities Association state outdoor track and field long jump title. Erica was the 2011 Mississippi state long jump leader.

Erica went to Mississippi State University on a track scholarship.

She won the heptathlon at the 2012 United States Junior Championships, scoring 5547 points; she trailed Kendell Williams through six events, but overtook her in the 800 meters. She made her international debut at the 2012 World Junior Championships in Barcelona, placing 13th. In the heptathlon, Bougard is strong in the five running and jumping events, but weak in the shot put and javelin throw.

As a sophomore, Bougard won the pentathlon at the 2013 NCAA indoor championships, scoring a school record 4399 points. At the outdoor NCAA meet she placed fourth in the heptathlon (with a personal best 5976 points) and sixteenth in the long jump. Two weeks later, she improved to 5990 points at the 2013 USA Outdoor Track and Field Championships, placing third and qualifying for the senior World Championships in Moscow. Bougard scored 5829 points at the World Championships, placing 24th.

At the 2014 NCAA indoor championships Bougard was second to Williams with 4586 points; both Williams and Bougard broke the previous collegiate record of 4569 points by Makeba Alcide. Outdoors, Bougard redshirted the collegiate season but broke 6000 points for the first time at the United States championships, repeating her third place from the previous year with 6118 points.

In 2015 Bougard again placed second to Williams at the NCAA indoor meet, this time with 4566 points; outdoors, she scored a personal best 6250 points at the SEC championships and entered the NCAA outdoor championships as the collegiate leader, but only placed fourth as Akela Jones won. At the 2015 USATF championships Bougard placed third for the third consecutive year, improving her best to 6288 points and qualifying for the World Championships in Beijing.

In 2016, Bougard completed in three events at 2016 NCAA Division I Outdoor Track and Field Championships in 6.18 m (20 ft 3 1/4 in) in long jump to place 12th, 1.82 m (5 ft 11 1/2 in) in high jump to place 5th and 6088 points in heptathlon to place 2nd. Three weeks later, Bougard placed seventh in heptathlon scoring 6070 points at 2016 United States Olympic Trials (track and field). She is openly lesbian.

== Competition record ==
Event	2012 USA Jr	2012 World Jr	2013 USA Outdoor	2013 World Outdoor	2014 USA Outdoor	2015 USA Outdoor	2015 World	2016 Trials	2017 USA Outdoor	2017 World Outdoor
100 metres hurdles	13.79 -1.6 (m/s)	13.73 -1.0 (m/s)	13.53; 4.9 (m/s)	13.69 −0.6 (m/s)	13.28; 0.9 (m/s)	13.03; 0.9 (m/s)	13.28 -0.7 (m/s)	13.11 -0.1 (m/s)	12.93 -0.1 (m/s)	13.24 -0.0 (m/s)
100 metres hurdles	1008 points	1017 points	1046 points	1023 points	1083 points	1120 points	1083 points	1108 points	1135 points	1089 points
High jump	1.75 m (5 ft 8 3/4 in)	1.72 m (5 ft 7 1/2 in)	1.78 m (5 ft 10 in)	1.80 m (5 ft 10 3/4 in)	1.78 m (5 ft 10 in)	1.88 m (6 ft 2 in)	1.83 m (6 ft 0 in)	1.84 m (6 ft 1/4 in)	1.92 m (6 ft 3 1/2 in)	1.74 m (5 ft 8 1/2 in)
High jump	916 points	879 points	953 points	978 points	953 points	1080 points	1016 points	1029 points	1132 points	903 points
Shot put	9.46 m (31 ft 1/4 in)	10.22 m (33 ft 6 1/4 in)	10.37 m (34 ft 1/4 in)	11.27 m (36 ft 11 1/2 in)	11.32 m (37 ft 1 1/2 in)	9.97 m (32 ft 8 1/2 in)	11.40 m (37 ft 4 3/4 in)	12.30 m (40 ft 4 1/4 in)	11.98 m (39 ft 3 1/2 in)	11.41 m (37 ft 5 in)
Shot put	494 points	544 points	554 points	613 points	616 points	527 points	621 points	681 points	660 points	622 points
200 metres	24.61 -0.6 (m/s)	24.64 -1.5 (m/s)	23.56; 0.1 (m/s)	24.59; 0.0 (m/s)	23.33; 2.6 (m/s)	23.40; 2.3 (m/s)	24.41 +0.2 (m/s)	23.94 -1.6 (m/s)	23.40 + 0.2 (m/s)	23.66 + 0.2 (m/s)
200 metres	923 points	920 points	1023 points	925 points	1046 points	1039 points	942 points	986 points	1039 points	1014 points
Long jump	6.03 m (19 ft 9 1/4 in) -0.3 (m/s)	5.82 m (19 ft 1 in) +2.5 (m/s)	6.22 m (20 ft 4 3/4 in) +2.6 (m/s)	6.01 m (19 ft 8 1/2 in) +0.0 (m/s)	6.21 m (20 ft 4 1/4 in) +0.0 (m/s)	6.13 m (20 ft 1 1/4 in) +1.4 (m/s)	6.18 m (20 ft 3 1/4 in) +0.1 (m/s)	6.33 m (20 ft 9 in) +2.3 (m/s)	6.36 m (20 ft 10 1/4 in) +1.1 (m/s)	6.09 m (19 ft 11 3/4 in) +1.1 (m/s)
Long jump	859 points	795 points	918 points	853 points	915 points	890 points	905 points	953 points	962 points	877 points
Javelin throw	28.37 m (93 ft 3/4 in)	24.20 m (79 ft 4 3/4 in)	34.60 m (113 ft 6 in)	32.62 m (107 ft 1/4 in)	33.05 m (108 ft 5 in)	38.76 m (127 ft 1 3/4 in)	35.06 m (115 ft 1/4 in)	29.74 m (97 ft 6 3/4 in)	40.96 m (134 ft 4 1/2 in)	33.76 m (110 ft 9 in)
Javelin throw	446 points	367 points	564 points	526 points	535 points	644 points	573 points	472 points	686 points	548 points
800 metres	2:14.39	2:15.36	2:12.25	2:13.72	2:09.64	2:08.39	DNS	2:18.74	2:11.51	2:08.77
800 metres	901 points	888 points	932 points	911 points	970 points	988 points	DNS	841 points	943 points	983 points
Total Points	5547 points	5410 points	5990 points	5829 points	6118 points	6288 points	DNF	6070 points	6557 points	6036 points
Place	1st	13th	3rd	24th	3rd	3rd	DNF	7th	2nd	18th

Championship	Place	Score	60 meters hurdles	High jump	Shot Put	Long Jump	800 metres
2017 US Indoor	1st	4558 points	1082 points 8.21 s	1067 points 1.87 m (6 ft 1 1/2 in)	659 points 11.97 m (39 ft 3 1/4 in)	905 points 6.18 m (20 ft 3 1/4 in)	845 points 2:18.41
2018 US Indoor	1st	4760 points	1134 points 7.98 s	1093 points 1.89 m (6 ft 2 1/4 in)	711 points 12.76 m (41 ft 10 1/4 in)	912 points 6.20 m (20 ft 4 in)	910 points 2:13.77
