= Athletics at the 2026 Commonwealth Games – Women's heptathlon =

Women's heptathlon at the 2026 Commonwealth Games
- Venue: Scotstoun Stadium
- Dates: 28 and 29 July 2026
- Competitors: 16 from 10 nations

Medalists
gold medal	Kate O'Connor	Northern Ireland
silver medal	Jade O'Dowda	England
bronze medal	Tori West	Australia

The women's heptathlon at the 2026 Commonwealth Games, as part of the athletics programme, will take place in the Scotstoun Stadium on 28 and 29 July 2026.

The event was won by Northern Ireland's World Championships silver medalist Kate O'Connor, who dominated the competition, winning five of the seven events and winning by 291 points. England's Jade O'Dowda claimed silver, having won bronze in 2022, and Australian Tori West took the bronze. It was Northern Ireland's first gold medal of the 2026 Games, and the first in athletics since 1986.

Two-time champion Katarina Johnson-Thompson of England withdrew on the eve of the Games, citing injury.

== Background ==
The event initially marked the return of current world bronze medalist, Olympic silver medalist, two-time world champion and back-to-back Commonwealth Games champion, Katarina Johnson-Thompson, seeking a unique three successive women's multi-event titles to match the feats of fellow English multi-eventer Daley Thompson, the only man to win three successive Commonwealth decathlons in 1978, 1982 and 1986 in addition to one world and two Olympic titles. However, injury forced Johnson-Thompson to withdraw on the eve of the event to prepare for the upcoming 2026 European Athletics Championships in Birmingham, to be replaced by 2018 Commonwealth Games bronze medalist Niamh Emerson, returning from a long period of injury.

This left Northern Ireland's world silver medalist (representing Ireland) and 2022 Commonwealth Games silver medalist, Kate O'Connor as favourite entering the event, seeking to replicate the gold-medal winning feats of fellow Northern Ireland multi-eventer and Commonwealth Games champion Mary Peters.

Other favourites include England's Jade O'Dowda, the 2022 Commonwealth bronze medalist, and Welsh heptathlete Abigail Pawlett, former European under 23 silver medalist, both of whom have represented Great Britain globally. Pawlett, however, withdrew from the heptathlon on the eve of the event to focus on the 200 metres due to injury concerns that also forced her to withdraw from the European Championships.

== Records ==
Prior to this competition, the existing world and Games records were as follows:

Records - Heptathlon
World record	7291 pts	Jackie Joyner-Kersee (USA)	Seoul, Korea	24 Sep 1988
Commonwealth record	6981 pts	Katarina Johnson-Thompson (ENG)	Doha, Qatar	4 October 2019
Games record	6695 pts	Jane Flemming (AUS)	Auckland, New Zealand	18 January 1990

== Schedule ==
The schedule was as follows:

Date	Time	Round
28 July 2026	morning	100 metres hurdles
28 July 2026	morning	High jump
28 July 2026	evening	Shot put
28 July 2026	evening	200 metres
29 July 2026	morning	Long jump
29 July 2026	evening	Javelin throw
29 July 2026	evening	800 metres

All times are British Summer Time (UTC+1)

== Results ==
Competitors contest a series of 7 events over two days, with their results being converted into points. The final standings are decided by their cumulative points tallies.

=== 100 metres hurdles ===
The two heats of the heptathlon 100 metres hurdles took place at 10:09 a.m.

Rank	Heat	Lane	Athlete	Time	Points	Notes
1	2	3	Sienna MacDonald (CAN)	12.99	1126	
2	2	2	Jade O'Dowda (ENG)	13.22	1077	
3	2	7	Kate O'Connor (NIR)	13.54	1044	
4	2	6	Tori West (AUS)	13.55	1043	
5	2	8	Briana Stephenson (NZL)	13.67	10.26	
6	1	8	Anna McCauley (NIR)	13.70	1021	PB
7	1	4	Ellen Barber (ENG)	13.74	10.15	PB
8	1	2	Hannah Blair (CAN)	13.93	988	
9	2	5	Niamh Emerson (ENG)	14.03	974	
10	1	3	Lucy Woodward (JEY)	14.05	971	PB
11	2	4	Mia Scerri (AUS)	14.05	971	
12	1	5	Allie Routledge (SCO)	14.20	950	PB
13	2	1	Ella Rush (GIB)	14.24	945	
14	1	7	Maddie Wilson (NZL)	14.28	939	
15	1	6	Adele Mafogang Tenkeu (CMR)	14.80	868	

=== High jump ===
The heptathlon high jump was held in two groups at 11:10 a.m.

Rank	Athlete	1.52	1.55	1.58	1.61	1.64	1.67	1.70	1.73	1.76	1.79	1.82	1.85	Mark	Points	Notes	Overall
1	Kate O'Connor (NIR)	-	-	-	-	-	o	o	o	o	o	xxo	xxx	1.82	1003		2047
1	Maddie Wilson (NZL)	-	-	-	-	-	-	-	o	o	o	xxo	xxx	1.82	1003		1942
3	Niamh Emerson (ENG)	-	-	-	-	-	o	o	xxo	o	o	xxx		1.79	966		1940
4	Jade O'Dowda (ENG)	-	-	-	-	o	o	o	o	o	xxo	xxx		1.79	966		2043
5	Hannah Blair (CAN)	-	-	-	-	-	o	o	o	xxx				1.73	891		1879
5	Mia Scerri (AUS)	-	-	-	-	o	o	o	o	xxx				1.73	891		1862
5	Briana Stephenson (NZL)	-	-	-	-	o	-	o	o	xxx				1.73	891		1917
8	Anna McCauley (NIR)	-	-	-	-	o	o	o	xo	xxx				1.73	891		1912
9	Adele Mafogang Tenkeu (CMR)	-	-	-	o	o	xo	o	xxx					1.70	855		1723
10	Tori West (AUS)	-	-	-	-	o	o	xo	xxx					1.70	855		1898
11	Ella Rush (GIB)	-	o	o	o	o	o	xxx						1.67	818		1763
14	Ellen Barber (ENG)	-	-	-	o	o	xo	xxx						1.67	818		1833
13	Allie Routledge (SCO)	o	-	-	o	xo	xxo	xxx						1.67	818		1768
14	Sienna MacDonald (CAN)	-	-	o	xo	o	xxx							1.64	783		1909
15	Lucy Woodward (JEY)	xo	o	o	xxo	xo	xxx							1.64	783	PB	1754

=== Shot put ===
Rank	Athlete	#1	#2	#3	Mark	Points	Notes	Overall
1	Mia Scerri (AUS)	13.37	13.87	x	13.87	785		2647
2	Jade O'Dowda (ENG)	13.28	13.12	x	13.28	746		2789
3	Ellen Barber (ENG)	13.11	13.17	12.49	13.17	739		2571
4	Niamh Emerson (ENG)	11.40	12.94	12.30	12.94	723		2663
5	Kate O'Connor (NIR)	12.80	12.85	12.67	12.85	717		2764
6	Tori West (AUS)	11.74	11.78	12.51	12.51	695		2593
7	Anna McCauley (NIR)	12.13	11.44	9.41	12.13	670		2582
8	Maddie Wilson (NZL)	11.21	11.35	12.10	12.10	668		2610
9	Briana Stephenson (NZL)	11.96	11.55	10.76	11.96	658		2575
10	Ella Rush (GIB)	10.53	10.91	11.64	11.64	637		2400
11	Hannah Blair (CAN)	11.33	11.07	9.69	11.33	617		2496
11	Lucy Woodward (JEY)	11.33	11.04	11.18	11.33	617		2371
13	Sienna MacDonald (CAN)	10.89	10.87	11.21	11.21	609		2518
14	Adele Mafogang Tenkeu (CMR)	10.18	10.45	10.58	10.58	567		2290
15	Allie Routledge (SCO)	10.06	9.62	10.13	10.13	538		2306

=== 200 metres ===
Rank	Heat	Lane	Athlete	Time	Points	Notes	Overall
1	2	3	Kate O'Connor (NIR)	24.14	967		3731
2	1	2	Anna McCauley (NIR)	24.55	929		3511
3	1	3	Tori West (AUS)	24.60	924		3517
4	1	6	Briana Stephenson (NZL)	24.71	914		3489
4	1	7	Ellen Barber (ENG)	24.71	914		3486
6	1	1	Mia Scerri (AUS)	24.72	913		3560
7	1	8	Sienna MacDonald (CAN)	24.74	911		3429
8	1	4	Jade O'Dowda (ENG)	24.93	893		3682
9	2	6	Niamh Emerson (ENG)	24.95	891		3554
10	1	5	Ella Rush (GIB)	25.16	872		3272
11	2	2	Maddie Wilson (NZL)	25.35	855		3465
12	2	5	Lucy Woodward (JEY)	25.25	864	PB	3235
13	2	8	Allie Routledge (SCO)	26.01	796	PB	3102
14	2	4	Hannah Blair (CAN)	26.26	775		3271
15	2	7	Adele Mafogang Tenkeu (CMR)	26.51	753		3043

=== Long jump ===
The long jump in the heptathlon was held on the morning of 29 July.

Rank	Athlete	#1	#2	#3	Mark	Points	Notes	Overall
1	Kate O'Connor (NIR)	6.23	x	6.37	6.37	965		4696
2	Mia Scerri (AUS)	6.29	6.14	6.12	6.29	940		4500
3	Ella Rush (GIB)	6.01	6.27	6.01	6.27	934		4206
4	Jade O'Dowda (ENG)	6.16	6.17	6.26	6.26	930		4612
5	Anna McCauley (NIR)	6.09	6.23	5.81	6.23	921	PB	4432
6	Maddie Wilson (NZL)	6.23	x	x	6.23	921		4386
7	Ellen Barber (ENG)	6.20	x	5.82	6.20	912	PB	4398
8	Sienna MacDonald (CAN)	6.15	6.15	x	6.15	896		4325
9	Tori West (AUS)	5.74	6.13	x	6.13	890	PB	4407
10	Briana Stephenson (NZL)	5.77	x	6.04	6.04	862		4351
11	Niamh Emerson (ENG)	5.96	5.90	4.15	5.96	837		4391
12	Adele Mafogang Tenkeu (CMR)	5.68	5.88	5.85	5.88	813		3856
13	Lucy Woodward (JEY)	x	5.58	5.82	5.82	795	PB	4030
14	Hannah Blair (CAN)	x	5.63	x	5.63	738		4009
15	Allie Routledge (SCO)	4.98	5.46	5.15	5.46	688		3790

=== Javelin throw ===
The Javelin event within the heptathlon was held on the morning of 29 July.

Rank	Athlete	#1	#2	#3	Mark	Points	Notes	Overall
1	Kate O'Connor (NIR)	52.85	50.58	-	52.85	915	GHB	5611
2	Tori West (AUS)	44.03	46.15	47.24	47.24	807		5214
3	Jade O'Dowda (ENG)	42.66	42.21	43.85	43.85	741		5353
4	Ellen Barber (ENG)	39.55	42.77	42.28	42.77	721		5119
5	Sienna MacDonald (CAN)	42.21	38.92	37.16	42.21	710		5035
6	Maddie Wilson (NZL)	38.32	40.37	33.95	40.37	674		5060
7	Niamh Emerson (ENG)	39.21	39.91	35.69	39.91	666		5057
8	Allie Routledge (SCO)	35.37	x	38.37	38.37	636		4426
9	Anna McCauley (NIR)	36.99	36.63	36.98	36.99	610		5042
10	Mia Scerri (AUS)	36.30	35.79	x	36.30	596		5096
11	Briana Stephenson (NZL)	30.33	35.19	32.45	35.19	575		4926
12	Lucy Woodward (JEY)	34.62	33.37	34.40	34.62	564		4594
13	Adele Mafogang Tenkeu (CMR)	32.71	33.81	30.11	33.81	549		4405
14	Ella Rush (GIB)	31.88	30.06	31.53	31.88	512		4718
15	Hannah Blair (CAN)	x	28.20	27.13	28.20	443		4452

=== 800 metres ===
The final event of the heptathlon took place at 20:55 on the evening of 29 July.

Rank	Athlete	Time	Points	Notes
1	Kate O'Connor (NIR)	2:10.45	958	GHB
2	Anna McCauley (NIR)	2:10.86	952	
3	Maddie Wilson (NZL)	2:11.34	945	
4	Niamh Emerson (ENG)	2:11.37	945	
5	Lucy Woodward (JEY)	2:11.94	936	
6	Ellen Barber (ENG)	2:12.29	931	
7	Jade O'Dowda (ENG)	2:12.73	925	
8	Briana Stephenson (NZL)	2:13.27	917	
9	Mia Scerri (AUS)	2:14.52	900	PB
10	Tori West (AUS)	2:15.23	890	
11	Hannah Blair (CAN)	2:15.35	888	
12	Adele Mafogang Tenkeu (CMR)	2:17.54	857	
13	Ella Rush (GIB)	2:19.30	833	
14	Sienna MacDonald (CAN)	2:22.35	792	
-	Allie Routledge (SCO)	DNS	-	

== Final standings ==
After 7of 7 events

Rank	Athlete	Event points							Total points	Notes
Rank	Athlete	100mh	HJ	SP	200m	LJ	JT	800m	Total points	Notes
1st place, gold medalist(s)	Kate O'Connor (NIR)	1044	1003	717	967	965	915	958	6569	
2nd place, silver medalist(s)	Jade O'Dowda (ENG)	1077	966	746	893	930	741	925	6278	
3rd place, bronze medalist(s)	Tori West (AUS)	1043	855	695	924	890	807	890	6104	
4	Ellen Barber (ENG)	1015	818	739	914	912	721	931	6050	
5	Maddie Wilson (NZL)	939	1003	668	855	921	674	945	6005	
6	Niamh Emerson (ENG)	974	966	723	891	837	666	945	6002	
7	Mia Scerri (AUS)	971	891	785	913	940	596	900	5996	
8	Anna McCauley (NIR)	1021	891	670	929	921	610	952	5994	
9	Briana Stephenson (NZL)	1026	891	658	914	862	575	917	5843	
10	Sienna MacDonald (CAN)	1126	783	609	911	896	710	792	5827	
11	Ella Rush (GIB)	945	818	637	872	934	512	833	5551	
12	Lucy Woodward (JEY)	971	783	617	864	795	564	936	5530	
13	Hannah Blair (CAN)	988	891	617	775	738	443	888	5340	
14	Adele Mafogang Tenkeu (CMR)	868	855	567	753	813	549	857	5262	
-	Allie Routledge (SCO)	950	818	538	796	688	636	-	NM	
