= 2026 World Athletics Indoor Championships – Women's pentathlon =

Women's pentathlon at the 2026 World Athletics Indoor Championships
- Venue: Kujawsko-Pomorska Arena Toruń
- Location: Toruń, Poland
- Dates: 22 March
- Competitors: 13 from 11 nations
- Winning score: 4888

Medalists
gold medal	Sofie Dokter	Netherlands
silver medal	Anna Hall	United States
bronze medal	Kate O'Connor	Ireland

The women's pentathlon at the 2026 World Athletics Indoor Championships took place on the short track of the Kujawsko-Pomorska Arena Toruń in Toruń, Poland, on 22 March 2026. This was the 18th time the event was contested at the World Athletics Indoor Championships. Athletes could qualify by their World Athletics Ranking in the event.

== Background ==
The women's pentathlon was contested 17 times before 2026, at every previous edition of the World Athletics Indoor Championships since 1993

Records before the 2026 World Athletics Indoor Championships
Record	Athlete (nation)	Score (pts)	Location	Date
World record	Nafissatou Thiam (BEL)	5055	Istanbul, Turkey	3 March 2023
Championship record	Nataliya Dobrynska (UKR)	5013	Istanbul, Turkey	11 March 2012
2026 World Lead	Anna Hall (USA)	4831	Indianapolis, United States	22 February 2026

== Qualification ==
For the women's pentathlon, athletes could also qualify by virtue of their World Athletics Ranking for the event. There is a target number of 14 athletes.

== Results ==
=== 60 metres hurdles ===
The 60 metres hurdles was held on 22 March, starting at 10:05 (UTC+1) in the morning.

Place	Heat	Lane	Athlete	Nation	Time	Points	Notes
1	2	4	Anna Hall	United States	8.18	1088	
2	2	8	Sofie Dokter	Netherlands	8.19	1086	PB
3	2	3	Szabina Szűcs	Hungary	8.21	1082	PB
4	2	7	Beatričė Juškevičiūtė	Lithuania	8.23 (.225)	1077	SB
5	2	5	Kate O'Connor	Ireland	8.23 (.229	1077	
6	1	4	Martha Araújo	Colombia	8.25 (.243)	1073	PB
7	2	6	Sveva Gerevini	Italy	8.25 (.244)	1073	PB
8	2	2	Paulina Ligarska	Poland	8.31	1059	PB
9	1	5	Sandrina Sprengel	Germany	8.40	1039	SB
10	1	6	Adrianna Sułek-Schubert	Poland	8.44	1030	
11	1	2	Ellen Barber	Great Britain	8.66	982	PB
12	1	3	Allie Jones	United States	8.74	965	SB
13	1	7	Anastasia Ntragkomirova	Greece	8.76	961	

=== High jump ===
The high jump was held on 22 March, starting at 10:43 (UTC+1) in the morning.

Place	Name	Nation	1.60	1.63	1.66	1.69	1.72	1.75	1.78	1.81	1.84	1.87	1.90	Result	Points	Notes	Total
1	Sofie Dokter	Netherlands	–	–	–	–	o	o	xo	o	xo	xxo	xxx	1.87	1067	SB	2153
2	Anna Hall	United States	–	–	–	–	o	o	o	o	xo	xxx		1.84	1029		2117
3	Adrianna Sułek-Schubert	Poland	–	–	–	o	o	xo	o	xo	xxx			1.81	991	SB	2021
4	Kate O'Connor	Ireland	–	–	–	o	o	xo	o	xxo	xxx			1.81	991	SB	2068
5	Szabina Szűcs	Hungary	–	o	o	o	o	o	xo	xxx				1.78	953	SB	2035
6	Sveva Gerevini	Italy	o	o	o	o	o	xxx						1.72	879	SB	1952
7	Paulina Ligarska	Poland	–	–	xo	o	o	xxx						1.72	879		1938
8	Martha Araújo	Colombia	o	o	xxo	o	xxo	xxx						1.72	879	SB	1952
9	Sandrina Sprengel	Germany	–	–	o	o	xxx							1.69	842		1881
10	Ellen Barber	Great Britain	o	o	xo	xxo	xxx							1.69	842	SB	1824
11	Anastasia Ntragkomirova	Greece	xo	xo	xo	xxo	xxx							1.69	842		1803
12	Beatričė Juškevičiūtė	Lithuania	o	xo	o	xxx								1.66	806	SB	1883
13	Allie Jones	United States	o	o	xxx									1.63	771	SB	1736

=== Shot put ===
The shot put was held on 22 March, starting at 12:55 (UTC+1) in the morning.

Rank	Name	Nationality	#1	#2	#3	Result	Points	Notes	Total
1	Anastasia Ntragkomirova	Greece	15.40	15.14	15.12	15.40	888		2691
2	Adrianna Sułek-Schubert	Poland	14.89	x	x	14.89	854	PB	2875
3	Kate O'Connor	Ireland	14.59	14.65	14.70	14.70	841	PB	2909
4	Beatričė Juškevičiūtė	Lithuania	13.89	14.45	13.11	14.45	824	SB	2707
5	Anna Hall	United States	13.43	x	14.23	14.23	809	SB	2926
6	Paulina Ligarska	Poland	13.81	13.90	14.11	14.11	801		2739
7	Sofie Dokter	Netherlands	13.36	13.92	12.60	13.92	789	SB	2942
8	Sandrina Sprengel	Germany	13.79	13.16	x	13.79	780	SB	2661
9	Ellen Barber	Great Britain	13.56	13.50	13.27	13.56	765		2589
10	Sveva Gerevini	Italy	12.81	13.10	13.09	13.10	734	PB	2686
11	Martha Araújo	Colombia	12.59	12.78	x	12.78	713	SB	2665
12	Szabina Szűcs	Hungary	12.76	x	12.03	12.76	711		2746
13	Allie Jones	United States	11.94	11.60	x	11.94	657	SB	2393

=== Long jump ===
The long jump was held on 22 March, starting at 17:40 (UTC+1) in the evening.

Rank	Name	Nationality	#1	#2	#3	Result	Points	Notes	Total
1	Sofie Dokter	Netherlands	6.34	x	6.52	6.52	1014	SB	3956
2	Martha Araújo	Colombia	6.28	6.39	6.48	6.48	1001		3666
3	Kate O'Connor	Ireland	x	6.17	6.38	6.38	969		3878
4	Szabina Szűcs	Hungary	6.23	6.29	6.16	6.29	940	SB	3686
5	Anna Hall	United States	6.14	6.19	6.21	6.21	915	SB	3841
6	Sandrina Sprengel	Germany	6.07	6.20	5.92	6.20	912		3573
7	Sveva Gerevini	Italy	5.92	6.15	5.83	6.15	896		3582
8	Paulina Ligarska	Poland	6.05	6.13	6.11	6.13	890		3629
9	Ellen Barber	Great Britain	5.99	5.90	5.89	5.99	846	SB	3435
10	Adrianna Sułek-Schubert	Poland	5.98	x	5.83	5.98	843		3718
11	Beatričė Juškevičiūtė	Lithuania	5.87	5.42	5.83	5.87	810	SB	3517
12	Anastasia Ntragkomirova	Greece	5.85	x	5.86	5.86	807		3498
13	Allie Jones	United States	5.15	r		5.15	601	SB	2994

=== 800 metres ===
The 800 metres was held on 22 March, starting at 20:03 (UTC+1) in the evening.

Rank	Name	Nationality	Time	Points	Notes	Total
1	Anna Hall	United States	2:06.32	1019	CPB	4860
2	Kate O'Connor	Ireland	2:10.26	961	PB	4839
3	Ellen Barber	Great Britain	2:10.86	952	PB	4387
4	Sveva Gerevini	Italy	2:11.69	940	SB	4522
5	Sofie Dokter	Netherlands	2:12.27	932	SB	4888
6	Szabina Szűcs	Hungary	2:12.28	932		4618
7	Paulina Ligarska	Poland	2:12.54	928		4557
8	Adrianna Sułek-Schubert	Poland	2:13.10	920		4638
9	Sandrina Sprengel	Germany	2:14.32	902	PB	4475
10	Beatričė Juškevičiūtė	Lithuania	2:16.24	875	SB	4392
11	Anastasia Ntragkomirova	Greece	2:35.82	622	PB	4120
	Martha Araújo	Colombia	DNS			
	Allie Jones	United States	DNS			

=== Final standings ===
Rank	Name	Nationality	Points	Notes
1st place, gold medalist(s)	Sofie Dokter	Netherlands	4888	WL
2nd place, silver medalist(s)	Anna Hall	United States	4860	SB
3rd place, bronze medalist(s)	Kate O'Connor	Ireland	4839	NR
4	Adrianna Sułek-Schubert	Poland	4638	
5	Szabina Szűcs	Hungary	4618	SB
6	Paulina Ligarska	Poland	4557	
7	Sveva Gerevini	Italy	4522	SB
8	Sandrina Sprengel	Germany	4475	PB
9	Beatričė Juškevičiūtė	Lithuania	4392	SB
10	Ellen Barber	Great Britain	4387	PB
11	Anastasia Ntragkomirova	Greece	4120	
	Allie Jones	United States	DNF	
	Martha Araújo	Colombia	DNF	
