= 2024 Hypo-Meeting =

- Venue: Mösle Stadium
- Location: Götzis, Austria
- Dates: May 18–19
- Website: https://meeting-goetzis.at/en/

Champions
- Men: (Canada) Damian Warner (8678)
- Women: (Netherlands) Anouk Vetter (6642)

The 49th edition of the annual Hypo-Meeting took place on May 18 and 19, 2024, in Götzis, Vorarlberg (Austria). The track and field competition, featuring a men's decathlon and a women's heptathlon event was part of the 2024 World Athletics Combined Events Tour.

== Men's decathlon ==
=== Records ===
World Record	Kevin Mayer (FRA)	9126	16 September 2018	Talence, France
Event Record	Roman Šebrle (CZE)	9026	27 May 2001	Götzis, Austria

=== Results ===
The best mark recorded in each event is highlighted in yellow

Rank	Athlete	Decathlon										Points
Rank	Athlete	100	LJ	SP	HJ	400	110H	DT	PV	JT	1500	Points
1	Damian Warner (CAN)	10.20	7.80	14.55	2.03	47.46	13.45	46.41	4.80	57.53	4:36.94	8678 SB
2	Sven Roosen (NED)	10.49	7.48	15.03	1.91	46.64	14.18	43.88	4.70	64.04	4:20.77	8517 PB
3	Johannes Erm (EST)	10.64	7.90	14.72	1.91	48.07	14.27	45.18	5.10	55.42	4:27.17	8462 SB
4	Ashley Moloney (AUS)	10.34	7.75	14.11	2.00	47.59	14.31	44.53	4.90	57.41	4:50.00	8367 SB
5	Lindon Victor (GRN)	10.48	7.73	15.14	1.97	48.36	14.72	52.34	4.60	59.10	4:51.30	8366 SB
6	Tim Nowak (GER)	11.09	7.24	14.58	2.03	50.08	14.33	44.82	5.00	61.08	4:21.00	8282 PB
7	Felix Wolter (GER)	10.58	7.70	13.73	1.97	47.96	14.12	39.92	4.80	56.23	4:37.21	8190 SB
8	Ken Mullings (BAH)	10.45	7.56	15.43	2.03	49.61	13.72	43.63	4.80	54.50	5:09.77	8176 PB
9	Nils Laserich (GER)	10.79	7.39	15.63	2.00	48.43	14.68	42.99	4.50	58.74	4:34.30	8146 PB
10	Edgaras Benkunskas (LTU)	11.02	7.02	15.91	2.00	50.65	14.51	45.44	4.70	69.67	4:52.96	8098 PB
11	Devon Williams (USA)	10.67	7.63	14.26	1.91	49.18	14.00	45.63	4.70	52.53	4:43.23	8082
12	José Fernando Ferreira (BRA)	10.70	7.25	14.58	1.94	51.58	13.91	43.13	5.00	65.05	5:01.22	8050 SB
13	Vilém Stráský (CZE)	10.72	7.47	13.21	1.94	48.81	13.98	39.60	4.70	52.14	4:22.53	8016 PB
14	Andrin Huber (SUI)	10.84	7.04	13.81	2.00	49.61	14.70	40.77	4.60	50.84	4:15.40	7873 PB
15	Finley Gaio (SUI)	10.61	7.57	13.99	1.88	48.52	14.00	40.03	5.00	48.66	5:03.10	7870 SB
16	Sven Jansons (NED)	10.56	7.38	13.11	1.88	48.15	14.51	41.61	4.60	49.69	4:32.12	7850 PB
17	Marcel Meyer (GER)	10.93	7.15	13.72	1.91	48.18	14.64	43.08	4.80	52.78	4:39.20	7845 SB
18	Niels Pittomvils (BEL)	11.25	7.12	14.96	2.03	50.89	14.58	45.57	NM	50.56	4:38.41	7007 SB
	Simon Ehammer (SUI)	10.34	8.25	14.08	2.03	48.22	13.55	37.36	5.00	48.57	DNS	DNF
	Rasmus Roosleht (EST)	10.87	NM	15.87	2.00	50.30	DNF	42.25	NM	DNS		DNF
	Risto Lillemets (EST)	10.93	7.04	14.52	1.97	49.39	DNF	42.25	NM	DNS		DNF
	Jack Flood (USA)	11.20	7.16	DNS								DNF

== Women's heptathlon ==
=== Records ===
World Record	Jackie Joyner-Kersee (USA)	7291	September 24, 1988	Seoul, South Korea
Event Record	Nafissatou Thiam (BEL)	7013	May 28, 2017	Götzis, Austria

=== Results ===
The best mark recorded in each event is highlighted in yellow

Rank	Athlete	Heptathlon							Points
Rank	Athlete	100H	HJ	SP	200m	LJ	JT	800m	Points
1	Anouk Vetter (NED)	13.64	1.74	15.37	23.73	6.47	57.91	2:21.37	6642 WL
2	Annik Kälin (SUI)	12.97	1.68	14.33	23.72	6.70	45.93	2:16.63	6506 SB
3	Michelle Atherley (USA)	12.71	1.80	13.67	23.53	6.18	38.03	2:08.55	6465 PB
4	Emma Oosterwegel (NED)	13.58	1.74	14.13	24.44	5.90	51.66	2:11.56	6337 SB
5	Vanessa Grimm (GER)	13.95	1.77	14.37	24.22	6.23	45.15	2:13.45	6307 SB
6	Tori West (AUS)	13.63	1.71	13.72	23.67	6.09	47.36	2:16.41	6245 PB
7	Annie Kunz (USA)	13.26	1.74	15.14	24.66	6.07	41.79	2:17.40	6209 SB
8	Verena Mayr (AUT)	13.71	1.74	14.26	24.65	6.03	43.52	2:11.09	6196 SB
9	Allie Jones (USA)	13.00	1.68	12.91	23.48	6.24	37.39	2:11.80	6185 SB
10	Ivona Dadic (AUT)	13.56	1.62	14.56	23.92	5.84	46.30	2:14.07	6115 SB
11	Abigail Pawlett (GBR)	13.10	1.71	14.39	23.55	6.02	32.09	2:20.32	6011 PB
12	Mathilde Rey (SUI)	14.47	1.80	13.89	25.87	5.89	44.83	2:14.03	5969 SB
13	Marie Dehning (GER)	14.42	1.65	13.21	25.06	6.07	53.17	2:20.34	5949 SB
14	Celine Jansen (SUI)	13.59	1.65	13.48	23.96	6.05	35.39	2:13.05	5940
15	Chiara-Belinda Schuler (AUT)	13.69	1.59	13.69	24.73	5.86	48.39	2:25.27	5822
16	Bianca Salming (SWE)	14.79	1.77	14.28	26.45	5.58	44.89	2:17.56	5723
17	Holly Mills (GBR)	14.82	1.68	12.86	25.94	5.33	33.53	2:15.44	5298 SB
18	Beatrice Juškevičiūtė (LTU)	12.87	1.68	13.19	23.58	6.09	36.49	DNF	5212
19	Sandrina Sprengel (GER)	28.40	1.74	13.16	23.98	6.29	43.31	2:18.86	5134
20	Katre Sofia Palm (EST)	23.68	1.68	12.95	25.50	5.65	37.72	DNF	3833
	Isabel Posch (AUT)	13.62	1.65	13.09	24.21	5.99	42.15	DNS	DNF
	Jodie Smith (GBR)	13.38	1.77	11.89	24.39	6.09	36.35	DNS	DNF
	Lucie Kienast (GER)	14.34	1.71	13.48	24.61	6.50	DNS		DNF
	Sarah Lagger (AUT)	14.76	1.74	13.08	26.43	5.70	DNS		DNF
	Sophie Weißenberg (GER)	DNF	1.74	13.40	23.39	6.25	DNS		DNF
	Erica Bougard (USA)	13.77	1.77	11.74	DNS				DNF
	Taliyah Brooks (USA)	DNS							DNS
