= Gibraltar at the 2026 Commonwealth Games =

- Flag of Gibraltar
- CG code: GIB
- CGA: Gibraltar Commonwealth Games Association
- Website: facebook.com/TeamGibraltarCGA (Facebook)

in Glasgow, Scotland 23 July 2026 – 2 August 2026
- Competitors: 16 in 5 sports
- Flag bearer: Jordan Gonzalez
- Baton bearer: Holly O'Shea
- Medals: Gold 0 Silver 0 Bronze 0 Total 0

Commonwealth Games appearances (overview)
- 1958; 1962; 1966; 1970; 1974; 1978; 1982; 1986; 1990; 1994; 1998; 2002; 2006; 2010; 2014; 2018; 2022; 2026; 2030

Gibraltar competed at the 2026 Commonwealth Games in Glasgow, Scotland. This marked Gibraltar's 18th participation at the games, after making its debut at the 1958 Commonwealth Games.

The King's Baton relay stopped in Gibraltar in May 2026.

Gibraltar's team consisted of sixteen athletes (11 men and five women), competing in four sports. The team was officially named in May 2026. Swimmer Jordan Gonzalez was the country's opening ceremony flagbearer. Meanwhile, weightlifter Holly O'Shea was the baton bearer during the opening ceremony.

== Competitors ==
The following is the list of number of competitors participating at the Games per sport/discipline.

Sport	Men	Women	Total
Athletics	4	1	5
Boxing	1	0	1
Judo	2	0	2
Swimming	4	3	7
Weightlifting	0	1	1
Total	11	5	16

== Athletics ==
Gibraltar entered four athletes (three men and one woman).

Key

Ranks given for track events are within the athlete's heat only.

- Q = Qualified for the next round
- q = Qualified for the next round as a fastest loser or, in field events, by position without achieving the qualifying target

Track events

Athlete	Event	Heat		Semifinal		Final	
Athlete	Event	Result	Rank	Result	Rank	Result	Rank
Pau Funes Fa	Men's 100 m	11.38	6	Did not advance			
Pau Funes Fa	Men's 200 m	23.34	5	Did not advance			
Luke Desoiza	Men's 400 m	51.23	8	Did not advance			
Finley Cant	Men's 800 m	2:01.08	8	Did not advance			

Field events

Athlete	Event	Qualification		Final	
Athlete	Event	Result	Rank	Result	Rank
Julian Turnock	Men's shot put	12.31 NR	14	Did not advance	

Combined events – Women's heptathlon

Athlete	Event	100H	HJ	SP	200 m	LJ	JT	800 m	Points	Rank
Ella Rush	Result	14.24	1.67	11.64	25.16	6.27	31.88	2:19.30	5551	11
Ella Rush	Points	945	818	637	872	934	512	833	5551	11

== Boxing ==
Gibraltar entered one male boxer. This marked the debut appearance in the sport at the Commonwealth Games for the dependency.

Athlete	Event	Round of 32	Round of 16	Quarterfinals	Semifinals	Final	
Athlete	Event	Opposition Result	Opposition Result	Opposition Result	Opposition Result	Opposition Result	Rank
Ewan Gracia	Men's 65 kg	Bye	Bonzo (MAW); L RSC	Did not advance			

== Judo ==
Gibraltar entered two male judoka. This marked the country's debut in the sport at the Commonwealth Games.

Men

Athlete	Event	Round of 16	Quarterfinals	Semifinals	Repechage	Final/BM	
Athlete	Event	Opposition Result	Opposition Result	Opposition Result	Opposition Result	Opposition Result	Rank
Adam Stevens	81 kg	Percival (SAM); L 000–003s2	Did not advance				
Bradley Morris-McKenzie	90 kg	Petgrave (ENG); L 000–100	Did not advance				

== Swimming ==
Gibraltar entered seven swimmers (four men and three women).

Men

Athlete	Event	Heat		Semifinal		Final	
Athlete	Event	Time	Rank	Time	Rank	Time	Rank
James Sanderson	50 m freestyle	24.76	49	Did not advance			
James Sanderson	100 m freestyle	54.78	54	Did not advance			
James Sanderson	50 m butterfly	26.69	54	Did not advance			
Adam Burns	200 m freestyle	2:10.13	37	—N/a		Did not advance	
Adam Burns	400 m freestyle	4:30.52	25	—N/a		Did not advance	
Christian Chang-Chipolina	200 m freestyle	2:11.95	39	—N/a		Did not advance	
Christian Chang-Chipolina	400 m freestyle	4:34.15	26	—N/a		Did not advance	
Christian Chang-Chipolina	800 m freestyle	—N/a				9:19.83	14
Jordan Gonzalez	50 m backstroke	28.30	29	Did not advance			
Jordan Gonzalez	50 m butterfly	26.18	48	Did not advance			

Women

Athlete	Event	Heat		Semifinal		Final	
Athlete	Event	Time	Rank	Time	Rank	Time	Rank
Katie Green	50 m freestyle	29.25	57	Did not advance			
Katie Green	100 m freestyle	1:03.92	57	Did not advance			
Katie Green	200 m freestyle	2:17.14	32	—N/a		Did not advance	
Katie Green	50 m backstroke	34.74	38	Did not advance			
Katie Green	50 m breaststroke	37.71	26	Did not advance			
Katie Green	200 m individual medley	2:37.16	16	—N/a		Did not advance	
Katie Maddocks	50 m freestyle	29.97	61	Did not advance			
Katie Maddocks	100 m freestyle	1:05.53	59	Did not advance			
Katie Maddocks	50 m backstroke	34.13	37	Did not advance			
Katie Maddocks	100 m backstroke	1:13.63	35	Did not advance			
Asia Kent	50 m breaststroke	33.11	16 Q	33.36	16	Did not advance	
Asia Kent	100 m breaststroke	1:13.22	18 R	Did not advance			
Asia Kent	200 m breaststroke	2:38.41	12	—N/a		Did not advance	

== Weightlifting ==
Gibraltar received a bipartie quota spot for Holly O'Shea. O'Shea would go onto a tenth place finish.

Athlete	Event	Snatch (kg)		Clean & Jerk (kg)		Total (kg)	Rank
Athlete	Event	Result	Rank	Result	Rank	Total (kg)	Rank
Holly O'Shea	Women's 69 kg	80	10	100	10	180	10
