= Athletics at the 2015 Summer Universiade – Women's heptathlon =

The women's heptathlon event at the 2015 Summer Universiade was held on 10–11 July.

== Medalists ==
Gold	Silver	Bronze
Anna Maiwald; Germany	Ida Marcussen; Norway	Anna Petrich; Russia

== Results ==
=== 100 metres hurdles ===
Wind:
Heat 1: -0.7 m/s, Heat 2: +1.3 m/s

Rank	Heat	Name	Nationality	Time	Points	Notes
1	2	Chari Hawkins	United States	13.59	1037	
2	2	Salcia Slack	Jamaica	13.73	1017	
3	2	Anna Maiwald	Germany	13.75	1014	
4	2	Veronica Torr	New Zealand	13.85	1000	
5	2	Tatum Souza	United States	13.95	985	
6	2	Ida Marcussen	Norway	14.10	964	
7	1	Martina Corra	Argentina	14.13	960	
8	1	Anna Petrich	Russia	14.26	942	
9	2	Georgia Ellenwood	Canada	14.42	920	
10	1	Chen Yan	China	14.75	875	
11	1	Nicole Oudenaarden	Canada	15.57	768	
12	1	Dee-Ann Kentish Rogers	Anguilla	16.10	702	
13	1	Terje Kaunissaar	Estonia	16.24	685	
14	1	Brina Mljač	Slovenia	17.22	572	

=== High jump ===
Rank	Group	Athlete	Nationality	1.44	1.50	1.53	1.56	1.59	1.62	1.65	1.68	1.71	1.74	1.77	1.80	1.83	Result	Points	Notes	Total
1	A	Georgia Ellenwood	Canada	–	–	–	–	–	–	o	o	o	o	o	xo	xxx	1.80	978		1898
2	A	Anna Petrich	Russia	–	–	–	–	o	o	o	xxo	o	o	xxo	xxx		1.77	941		1883
3	A	Chari Hawkins	United States	–	–	–	–	–	–	o	o	o	o	xxx			1.74	903		1940
4	A	Veronica Torr	New Zealand	–	–	–	–	xo	o	o	o	o	xxx				1.71	867		1867
4	B	Terje Kaunissaar	Estonia	–	–	–	–	–	xo	o	o	o	xxx				1.71	867		1552
6	A	Nicole Oudenaarden	Canada	–	–	–	–	–	o	o	xxo	o	xxx				1.71	867		1635
7	A	Ida Marcussen	Norway	–	–	–	–	–	o	o	o	xxx					1.68	830		1794
8	A	Anna Maiwald	Germany	–	–	–	o	o	o	xo	o	xxx					1.68	830		1844
9	B	Chen Yan	China	–	o	o	o	o	o	xo	xo	xxx					1.68	830		1705
10	B	Martina Corra	Argentina	–	o	–	o	o	xo	o	xxx						1.65	795		1755
11	A	Tatum Souza	United States	–	o	–	o	xo	xo	o	xxx						1.65	795		1780
12	B	Salcia Slack	Jamaica	–	o	o	o	xxx									1.56	689		1706
13	B	Dee-Ann Kentish Rogers	Anguilla	–	o	xxx											1.50	621		1323
	B	Brina Mljač	Slovenia	xxx													NM	0		572

=== Shot put ===
Rank	Athlete	Nationality	#1	#2	#3	Result	Points	Notes	Total
1	Veronica Torr	New Zealand	13.48	14.08	13.59	14.08	799		2666
2	Tatum Souza	United States	13.39	13.98	x	13.98	793		2573
3	Anna Maiwald	Germany	12.63	12.98	13.39	13.39	753		2597
4	Ida Marcussen	Norway	12.72	12.72	13.35	13.35	751		2545
5	Nicole Oudenaarden	Canada	12.45	12.66	13.04	13.04	730		2365
6	Salcia Slack	Jamaica	x	12.45	x	12.45	691		2397
7	Terje Kaunissaar	Estonia	10.51	11.84	11.62	11.84	651		2203
8	Anna Petrich	Russia	11.55	11.61	x	11.61	635		2518
9	Chari Hawkins	United States	11.11	x	11.47	11.47	626		2566
10	Chen Yan	China	11.41	9.27	x	11.41	622		2327
11	Martina Corra	Argentina	10.81	11.10	10.75	11.10	602		2357
12	Georgia Ellenwood	Canada	10.80	10.96	10.98	10.98	594		2492
13	Brina Mljač	Slovenia	8.67	8.33	8.68	8.68	443		1015
14	Dee-Ann Kentish Rogers	Anguilla	8.40	8.32	8.04	8.40	425		1748

=== 200 metres ===
Wind:
Heat 1: -0.5 m/s, Heat 2: -0.4 m/s

Rank	Heat	Name	Nationality	Time	Points	Notes	Total
1	2	Anna Maiwald	Germany	24.14	967		3564
2	2	Salcia Slack	Jamaica	24.45	938		3335
3	1	Martina Corra	Argentina	25.03	884		3241
4	2	Chari Hawkins	United States	25.06	881		3447
5	1	Anna Petrich	Russia	25.13	875		3393
6	2	Georgia Ellenwood	Canada	25.39	851		3343
7	1	Ida Marcussen	Norway	25.52	840		3385
8	2	Nicole Oudenaarden	Canada	25.54	838		3203
9	2	Veronica Torr	New Zealand	25.77	817		3483
10	2	Tatum Souza	United States	26.20	780		3353
11	1	Chen Yan	China	26.44	759		3086
12	1	Terje Kaunissaar	Estonia	26.66	740		2943
13	1	Dee-Ann Kentish Rogers	Anguilla	27.02	710		2458
14	1	Brina Mljač	Slovenia	27.82	645		1660

=== Long jump ===
Rank	Athlete	Nationality	#1	#2	#3	Result	Points	Notes	Total
1	Anna Petrich	Russia	x	5.95	6.03	6.03	859		4252
2	Ida Marcussen	Norway	5.87	5.93	5.94	5.94	831		4216
3	Anna Maiwald	Germany	5.77	5.91	x	5.91	822		4386
4	Nicole Oudenaarden	Canada	x	5.91	x	5.91	822		4025
5	Veronica Torr	New Zealand	5.23	5.88	x	5.88	813		4296
6	Chari Hawkins	United States	5.64	x	5.74	5.74	771		4218
7	Georgia Ellenwood	Canada	x	5.71	x	5.71	762		4105
8	Salcia Slack	Jamaica	5.52	5.60	x	5.60	729		4064
9	Terje Kaunissaar	Estonia	5.52	x	x	5.52	706		3649
10	Tatum Souza	United States	4.93	5.04	5.06	5.06	576		3929
11	Martina Corra	Argentina	5.05	x	4.97	5.05	573		3814
12	Chen Yan	China	4.92	4.92	5.04	5.04	570		3656
13	Dee-Ann Kentish Rogers	Anguilla	x	x	4.72	4.72	485		2943
14	Brina Mljač	Slovenia	4.13	4.22	4.35	4.35	391		2051

=== Javelin throw ===
Rank	Athlete	Nationality	#1	#2	#3	Result	Points	Notes	Total
1	Nicole Oudenaarden	Canada	43.61	x	35.14	43.61	737		4762
2	Anna Maiwald	Germany	40.68	40.96	42.78	42.78	721		5107
3	Chari Hawkins	United States	37.15	42.29	–	42.29	711		4929
4	Ida Marcussen	Norway	41.16	42.15	39.64	42.15	709		4925
5	Georgia Ellenwood	Canada	40.80	41.92	x	41.92	704		4809
6	Martina Corra	Argentina	41.90	38.49	40.94	41.90	704		4518
7	Salcia Slack	Jamaica	40.15	x	41.84	41.84	703		4767
8	Tatum Souza	United States	41.71	41.68	41.71	41.71	700		4629
9	Chen Yan	China	38.34	41.04	34.57	41.04	687		4629
10	Terje Kaunissaar	Estonia	37.40	37.27	38.85	38.85	645		4294
11	Anna Petrich	Russia	32.40	37.36	38.05	38.05	630		4882
12	Veronica Torr	New Zealand	34.44	35.19	29.42	35.19	575		4871
13	Brina Mljač	Slovenia	27.30	25.77	24.26	27.30	426		2477
14	Dee-Ann Kentish Rogers	Anguilla	25.90	24.25	–	25.90	399		3342

=== 800 metres ===
Heat 2 Official Video

Rank	Heat	Name	Nationality	Time	Points	Notes
1	2	Ida Marcussen	Norway	2:11.70	940	
2	2	Anna Petrich	Russia	2:13.60	913	
3	2	Anna Maiwald	Germany	2:17.47	858	
4	2	Georgia Ellenwood	Canada	2:17.60	856	
5	1	Tatum Souza	United States	2:18.18	848	
6	1	Nicole Oudenaarden	Canada	2:19.22	834	
7	2	Veronica Torr	New Zealand	2:22.16	794	
8	2	Chari Hawkins	United States	2:23.43	778	
9	1	Martina Corra	Argentina	2:26.93	732	
10	1	Brina Mljač	Slovenia	2:28.52	712	
11	1	Chen Yan	China	2:29.38	701	
12	1	Terje Kaunissaar	Estonia	2:32.70	659	
	1	Dee-Ann Kentish Rogers	Anguilla	DNS	0	
	2	Salcia Slack	Jamaica	DNS	0	

=== Final standings ===
The highest mark recorded in each event is highlighted in yellow

Rank	Athlete	Nationality	100m H	HJ	SP	200m	LJ	JT	800m	Points	Notes
1st place, gold medalist(s)	Anna Maiwald	Germany	13.75	1.68	13.39	24.14	5.91	42.78	2:17.47	5965	
2nd place, silver medalist(s)	Ida Marcussen	Norway	14.10	1.68	13.35	25.52	5.94	42.15	2:11.70	5865	
3rd place, bronze medalist(s)	Anna Petrich	Russia	14.26	1.77	11.61	25.13	6.03	38.05	2:13.60	5795	PB
4	Chari Hawkins	United States	13.59	1.74	11.47	25.06	5.74	42.29	2:23.43	5707	
5	Georgia Ellenwood	Canada	14.42	1.80	10.98	25.39	5.71	41.92	2:17.60	5665	
6	Veronica Torr	New Zealand	13.85	1.71	14.08	25.77	5.88	35.19	2:22.16	5665	
7	Nicole Oudenaarden	Canada	15.57	1.71	13.04	25.54	5.91	43.61	2:19.22	5596	
8	Tatum Souza	United States	13.95	1.65	13.98	26.20	5.06	41.71	2:18.18	5477	
9	Martina Corra	Argentina	14.13	1.65	11.10	25.03	5.05	41.90	2:26.93	5250	PB
10	Chen Yan	China	14.75	1.68	11.41	26.44	5.04	41.04	2:29.38	5044	SB
11	Terje Kaunissaar	Estonia	16.24	1.71	11.84	26.66	5.52	38.85	2:32.70	4953	SB
12	Brina Mljač	Slovenia	17.22	NM	8.68	27.82	4.35	27.30	2:28.52	3189	
	Salcia Slack	Jamaica	13.73	1.56	12.45	24.45	5.60	41.84	DNS	DNF	
	Dee-Ann Kentish Rogers	Anguilla	16.10	1.50	8.40	27.02	4.72	25.90	DNS	DNF	
