= 2024 World Athletics Indoor Championships – Women's pentathlon =

Women's pentathlon at the 2024 World Athletics Indoor Championships
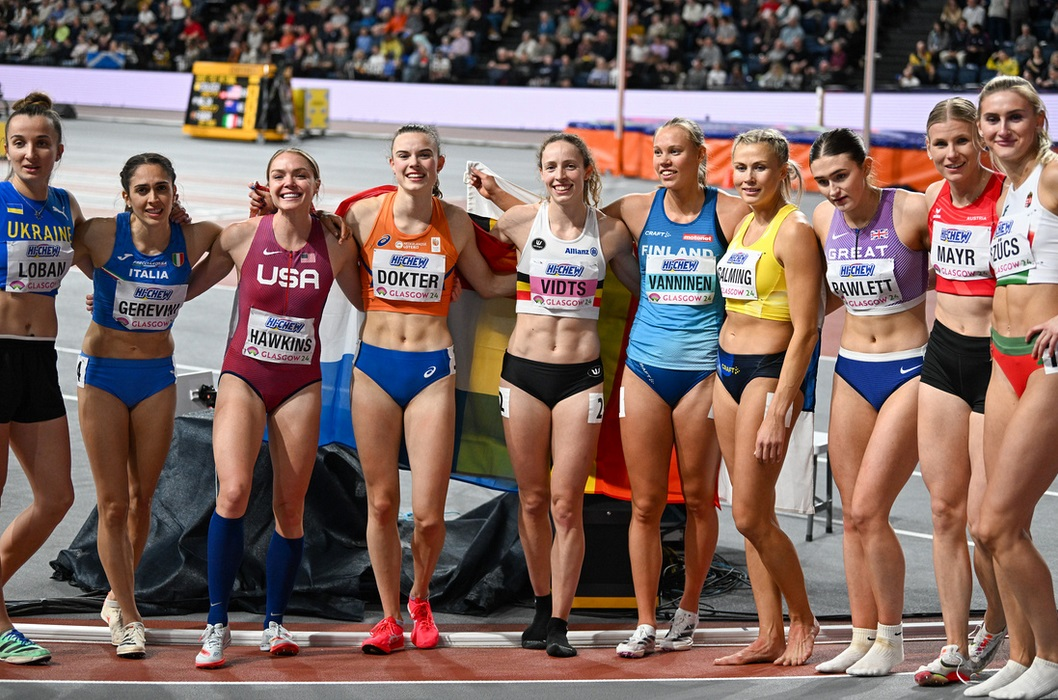
- Venue: Commonwealth Arena
- Dates: 1 March
- Competitors: 12 from 12 nations
- Winning points: 4773

Medalists
gold medal	Noor Vidts	Belgium
silver medal	Saga Vanninen	Finland
bronze medal	Sofie Dokter	Netherlands

The women's pentathlon at the 2024 World Athletics Indoor Championships took place on 1 March 2024.

== Results ==
=== 60 metres hurdles ===
The 60 metres hurdles were started at 10:05.

Rank	Heat	Name	Nationality	Time	Points	Notes
1	2	María Vicente	Spain	8.07	1113	
2	1	Chari Hawkins	United States	8.16	1093	PB
3	2	Abigail Pawlett	Great Britain	8.25	1073	
4	2	Noor Vidts	Belgium	8.27	1068	
5	2	Sveva Gerevini	Italy	8.28	1066	
6	2	Sofie Dokter	Netherlands	8.29	1064	PB
7	1	Saga Vanninen	Finland	8.33	1055	SB
8	1	Verena Mayr	Austria	8.47	1024	SB
9	2	Jana Koščak	Croatia	8.51	1015	
10	1	Yuliya Loban	Ukraine	8.54	1008	
11	1	Szabina Szűcs	Hungary	8.65	984	
12	1	Bianca Salming	Sweden	8.95	920	

=== High jump ===
The high jump was started at 10:55.

Rank	Athlete	Nationality	1.64	1.67	1.70	1.73	1.76	1.79	1.82	1.85	1.88	1.91	1.94	Result	Points	Notes	Total
1	Bianca Salming	Sweden	–	–	o	o	o	o	o	xxx				1.82	1003		1923
2	Noor Vidts	Belgium	–	–	o	o	o	o	xxx					1.79	966	SB	2034
3	Saga Vanninen	Finland	o	o	xo	o	xo	o	xxx					1.79	966	SB	2021
4	Chari Hawkins	United States	–	–	o	o	o	xxx						1.76	928	SB	2021
4	Sofie Dokter	Netherlands	–	–	o	o	o	xxx						1.76	928		1992
6	Sveva Gerevini	Italy	xo	o	o	xxo	o	xxx						1.76	928	=PB	1994
7	Yuliya Loban	Ukraine	o	o	o	o	xo	xxx						1.76	928	=SB	1936
8	Verena Mayr	Austria	o	o	o	xo	xxo	xxx						1.76	928	SB	1952
9	María Vicente	Spain	–	o	o	xr								1.70	855		1968
10	Abigail Pawlett	Great Britain	o	o	xxo	xxx								1.70	855		1928
11	Szabina Szűcs	Hungary	xo	–	xxx									1.64	783		1767
	Jana Koščak	Croatia												DNS	0		DNF

=== Shot put ===
The shot put was started at 13:14.

Rank	Name	Nationality	#1	#2	#3	Result	Points	Notes	Total
1	Saga Vanninen	Finland	X	14.91	15.01	15.01	862	SB	2883
2	Noor Vidts	Belgium	14.26	14.25	13.57	14.26	811	SB	2845
3	Bianca Salming	Sweden	13.60	13.88	13.93	13.93	789		2712
4	Yuliya Loban	Ukraine	13.90	X	13.32	13.90	787		2723
5	Verena Mayr	Austria	13.10	13.69	13.83	13.83	783		2735
6	Chari Hawkins	United States	13.20	12.82	13.37	13.37	752	SB	2773
7	Sofie Dokter	Netherlands	13.04	12.66	12.58	13.04	730		2722
8	Abigail Pawlett	Great Britain	12.29	12.90	12.95	12.95	724		2652
9	Sveva Gerevini	Italy	12.50	12.58	12.34	12.58	700	SB	2694
10	Szabina Szűcs	Hungary	11.91	12.25	11.77	12.25	678		2445
	María Vicente	Spain				DNS	0		DNF

=== Long jump ===
The long jump was started at 19:13.

Rank	Name	Nationality	#1	#2	#3	Result	Points	Notes	Total
1	Noor Vidts	Belgium	6.20	6.40	6.50	6.50	1007	SB	3852
2	Saga Vanninen	Finland	6.19	x	6.41	6.41	978	SB	3861
3	Sveva Gerevini	Italy	6.26	6.10	5.98	6.26	930	SB	3624
4	Sofie Dokter	Netherlands	6.20	x	x	6.20	912		3634
5	Abigail Pawlett	Great Britain	6.11	x	x	6.11	883		3535
6	Szabina Szűcs	Hungary	6.06	r		6.06	868		3313
7	Yuliya Loban	Ukraine	5.72	5.66	6.04	6.04	862		3585
8	Chari Hawkins	United States	5.53	5.99	5.95	5.99	846	SB	3619
9	Verena Mayr	Austria	5.79	5.93	5.58	5.93	828		3563
10	Bianca Salming	Sweden	x	5.65	x	5.65	744		3456

=== 800 metres ===
The 800 metres were started at 19:13.

Rank	Name	Nationality	Time	Points	Notes	Total
1	Sofie Dokter	Netherlands	2:11.89	937	PB	4571
2	Sveva Gerevini	Italy	2:12.07	935	SB	4559
3	Noor Vidts	Belgium	2:12.99	921	SB	4773
4	Szabina Szűcs	Hungary	2:14.05	906		4219
5	Verena Mayr	Austria	2:14.31	903		4466
6	Bianca Salming	Sweden	2:17.28	861		4317
7	Yuliya Loban	Ukraine	2:20.51	817		4402
8	Saga Vanninen	Finland	2:20.54	816	PB	4677
9	Chari Hawkins	United States	2:24.08	769	SB	4388
10	Abigail Pawlett	Great Britain	2:25.34	752		4287

=== Final standings ===
Rank	Name	Nationality	Points	Notes
1st place, gold medalist(s)	Noor Vidts	Belgium	4773	WL
2nd place, silver medalist(s)	Saga Vanninen	Finland	4677	NR
3rd place, bronze medalist(s)	Sofie Dokter	Netherlands	4571	SB
4	Sveva Gerevini	Italy	4559	NR
5	Verena Mayr	Austria	4466	
6	Yuliya Loban	Ukraine	4402	
7	Chari Hawkins	United States	4388	SB
8	Bianca Salming	Sweden	4317	
9	Abigail Pawlett	Great Britain	4287	
10	Szabina Szűcs	Hungary	4219	
	Maria Vicente	Spain	DNF	
	Jana Koščak	Croatia	DNF	
