= 2022 Canadian Track and Field Championships =

- Organisers: Athletics Canada
- Dates: June 22–26, 2022
- Host city: Langley, British Columbia
- Venue: McLeod Athletic Park
- Level: Senior
- Official website: https://athletics.ca/events/2022-canadian-track-field-championships/

The 2022 Canadian Track and Field Championships took place in Langley, British Columbia from June 22 to 26. Organized by Athletics Canada, they served as the senior national championship for track and field in Canada.

Granted they had achieved the world standard or had the necessary world ranking, athletes finishing in first earned automatic berths to represent Canada at the 2022 World Athletics Championships in Eugene, Oregon. The championships were held concurrently with the Canadian U20 Track and Field Championships.

Six championship records were set during the event: Marco Arop in the men's 800 m, Adam Keenan in the men's hammer throw, Ceili McCabe in the women's 3000 m steeplechase, Christabel Nettey in the women's long jump, Camryn Rodgers in the women's hammer throw and Sarah Mitton in the women's shot put. In addition to being a championship record, Mitton's mark of 20.33 m in the shot put was also a Canadian national record.

== Men's results ==
Athlete selected to compete in event at the 2022 World Athletics Championships

=== Track events ===
Event	Gold		Silver		Bronze	
100 metres	Aaron Brown	10.16	Jerome Blake	10.19	Benjamin Williams	10.35
200 metres	Aaron Brown	20.03	Jerome Blake	20.32	Jeremiah Lauzon	20.71
400 metres	Nathan George	45.51	Austin Cole	45.93	Emmett Bravakis	46.51
800 metres	Marco Arop	1:44.39 CR	Brandon McBride	1:45.15	Oliver Desmeules	1:47.11
1500 metres	Robert Heppenstall	3:56.42	William Paulson	3:56.66	Kieran Lumb	3:47.31
5000 metres	Charles Philibert-Thiboutot	13:31.98	Thomas Fafard	13:36.38	Mitchell Ubene	13:38.71
10,000 metres (Note: The 10,000 m events were held separately at the Pacific Distance Carnival on May 14 in Burnaby, British Columbia)	Lucas Bruchet	28:01.30	Charles Philibert-Thiboutot	28:11.81	Rory Linkletter	28:26.27
110 metres hurdles	Joey Daniels	13.96	Craig Thorne	13.97	Pierce LePage	14.28
400 metres hurdles	Benjamin Ayesu-Attah	51.04	Justin Rose	51.63	Joshua Adhemar	52.25
3000 metres steeplechase	John Gay	8:20.77	Ryan Smeeton	8:23.81	Jean-Simon Desgagnés	8:26.01
20 kilometres race walk	Evan Dunfee	1:23:28	Benjamin Thorne	1:24:02	Tyler Wilson	1:36:59

=== Field events ===
Event	Gold		Silver		Bronze	
High jump	Django Lovett	2.20 m	Eric Chatten	2.11 m	Noel Vanderzee	2.11 m
Pole vault	Nathan Filipek	5.26 m	Deryk Theodore	5.26 m	Brennan Seguin	4.96 m
Long jump	Jesse Thibodeau	7.37 m	Jonathan Jacob	7.29 m	Eric Che	7.19 m
Triple jump	Olorunfemi Akinduro	15.57 m	Brian Obonna	15.44 m	Patrick Hanna	15.34 m
Shot put	Mark Bujnowski	18.81 m	Youssef Koudssi	17.71 m	Dennis Ohene-Adu	17.07 m
Discus throw	Youssef Koudssi	54.77 m	Thomas Nedow	53.77 m	Pierce LePage	51.48 m
Hammer throw	Adam Keenan	75.17 m CR	Ethan Katzberg	71.75 m	Rowan Hamilton	67.79 m
Javelin throw	Joshua Mather	70.36 m	Callan Saldutto	70.25 m	Jared O'Riley	69.41 m
Decathlon	Rostam Turner	7075	Ryan Evans	6603	Jared Hendricks-Polack	6443

== Women's results ==
Athlete selected to compete in event at the 2022 World Athletics Championships

=== Track events ===
Event	Gold		Silver		Bronze	
100 metres	Khamica Bingham	11.36	Leya Buchanan	11.44	Crystal Emmanuel	11.45
200 metres	Natassha McDonald	22.67	Catherine Léger	23.01	Aiyanna-Brigitte Stiverne	23.02
400 metres	Aiyanna-Brigitte Stiverne	51.21	Lauren Gale	51.61	Natassha McDonald	51.65
800 metres	Madeleine Kelly	2:00.82	Lindsey Butterworth	2:00.85	Jazz Shukla	2:01.90
1500 metres	Lucia Stafford	4:17.22	Natalia Hawthorn	4:17.39	Glynis Sim	4:17.74
5000 metres	Gracelyn Larkin	15:51.47	Maria Bernard-Galea	15:51.63	Sasha Gollish	15:52.09
10,000 metres	Leslie Sexton	32:31.89	Sasha Gollish	32:56.89	Anne-Marie Comeau	33:13.89
100 metres hurdles	Michelle Harrison	12.99	Kaylyn Hall	13.64	Astrid Nyame	13.74
400 metres hurdles	Noelle Montcalm	56.54	Mary Ollier	57.85	Brooke Overholt	58.67
3000 metres steeplechase	Ceili McCabe	9:30.69 CR	Regan Yee	9:31.77	Grace Fetherstonaugh	9:38.41

=== Field events ===
Event	Gold		Silver		Bronze	
High jump	Marguerite Lorenzo	1.80 m	Barbara Bitchoka	1.80 m	Madisson Lawrence	1.75 m
Pole vault	Alysha Newman	4.40 m	Paige Cocks	4.10 m	Erika Fiedler	3.90 m
Long jump	Christabel Nettey	6.63 m CR	Madisson Lawrence	6.21 m	Aasha Marler	6.06 m
Triple jump	Busola Akinduro	12.62 m	Sabrina Nettey	12.13 m	Tamara Grahovac	11.96 m
Shot put	Sarah Mitton	20.33 m NR	Brittany Crew	16.39 m	Grace Tennant	15.79 m
Discus throw	Trinity Tutti	54.94 m	Rachel Andres	53.43 m	Grace Tennat	52.62 m
Hammer throw	Camryn Rogers	75.33 m CR	Jillian Weir	73.12 m	Kaila Butler	67.74 m
Javelin throw	Elizabeth Gleadle	60.88 m	Keira McCarrell	51.14 m	Bailey Dell	50.55 m
Heptathlon	Sienna MacDonald	5643	Madisson Lawrence	5478	Maude Léveillé	5217
