= Athletics at the 2025 Summer World University Games – Women's heptathlon =

Women's heptathlon at the 2025 Summer World University Games
- Venue: Lohrheidestadion
- Location: Bochum, Germany
- Dates: 23 July; 24 July
- Winning score: 6487 pts PB

Medalists
gold medal	Kate O'Connor	Ireland
silver medal	Szabina Szűcs	Hungary
bronze medal	Emelia Surch	Australia

The women's heptathlon event at the 2025 Summer World University Games was held in Bochum, Germany, at Lohrheidestadion on 23 and 24 July.

== Records ==
Prior to the competition, the records were as follows:

Record	Athlete (nation)	Points	Location	Date
Games record	Larisa Nikitina (URS)	6847	Duisburg, West Germany	29 August 1989
