= Sveva Gerevini =

Italian heptathlete

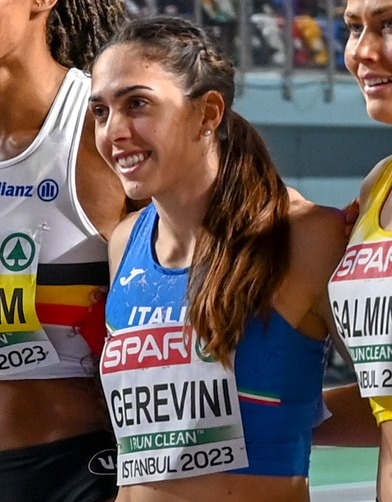
- Gerevini at Istanbul 2023

Personal information
- National team: Italy (caps 11)
- Born: 31 May 1996 (age 30) Cremona, Italy
- Height: 1.71 m (5 ft 7 in)
- Weight: 57 kg (126 lb)

Sport
- Sport: Athletics
- Events: Heptathlon; High jump Long jump
- Club: Cremona Sportiva Atl. Arvedi (2013-2020); C.S. Carabinieri (2021- )
- Coached by: Pietro Frittoli

Achievements and titles
- Personal bests: Heptathlon: 6379 (2024); High jump: 1.71 m (2019); Long jump: 5.95 m (2019); 400 m: 53.91 (2019)

Sveva Gerevini (born 31 May 1996) is an Italian heptathlete, who won nine national championships at individual senior level from 2017 to 2026.

== Personal life ==
Sveva Gerevini is a radiology technician. As a hobby, she draws comics, her strips, featuring Gerevini herself, were used in a radiology awareness campaign aimed at young people.

== Career ==
In 2019 at the national championships of Brixen she establishes her personal best with 5907 pts, 8th best Italian performance all-time and best result of an Italian female athlete in the last eight years.

== National records ==
- Heptathlon: 6379 ( (Italy) Rome, 8 June 2024) - current holder

== Achievements ==
Year	Competition	Venue	Rank	Event	Points	Notes
Young level
2017	European U23 Championships	(Poland) Bydgoszcz	17th	Heptathlon	5437 pts	PB
Senior level
2022	World Indoor Championships	(Serbia) Belgrade	9th	Pentathlon	4377 pts	
2022	European Championships	(Germany) Munich	11th	Heptathlon	6028 pts	PB
2023	European Indoor Championships	(Turkey) Istanbul	8th	Pentathlon	4363 pts	
2024	World Indoor Championships	(United Kingdom) Glasgow	4th	Pentathlon	4559 pts	NR
2024	European Championships	(Italy) Rome	6th	Heptathlon	6379 pts	NR
2024	Olympic Games	(France) Paris	13th	Heptathlon	6220 pts	
2025	European Indoor Championships	(Netherlands) Apeldoorn	6th	Pentathlon	4487 pts	
2025	World Championships	(Japan) Tokyo	13th	Heptathlon	6167 pts	PB
2026	World Indoor Championships	(Poland) Toruń	7th	Pentathlon	4522 pts	SB

== National titles ==
She has won nine national titles at individual senior level.

- Italian Athletics Championships
  - Heptathlon: 2017, 2018, 2019, 2000 (4)
- Italian Athletics Indoor Championships
  - Pentathlon: 2019, 2020, 2022, 2023. 2026 (5)

== See also ==
- Italian records in athletics
- Italian all-time lists - Heptathlon
