= Ellen Barber =

British heptathlete (born 1997)

Personal information
- Born: 5 December 1997 (age 28) Shepton Mallet, England

Sport
- Sport: Athletics
- Event: Heptathlon

Achievements and titles
- Personal bests: Heptathlon: 6169 (Götzis, 2026); Pentathlon: 4169 (Manchester, 2021)

Ellen Barber (born 5 December 1997) is a British multi-event athlete. She is a two-time national champion in the heptathlon, winning titles in 2019 and 2025. She represented Great Britain in the pentathlon at the 2026 World Indoor Championships.

== Early life ==
Barber attended King's School, Bruton in Bruton, Somerset, and won the heptathlon at the English Schools Combined Events Championship in 2016, and was also a medalist in the heptathlon at the SIAB schools championships.

== Career ==
Barber was runner-up to Kate O'Connor in the pentathlon at the national combined events indoor championships in February 2019. She won the national combined events outdoor title in the heptathlon 2019 with 5385 points. She was subsequently selected to compete for Great Britain at the 2019 European Combined Events Team Championships in Lutsk, Ukraine in July 2019.

Barber was runner-up to Jade O'Dowda at the England Athletics Combined Events Championships in Bedford in May 2021, with a personal best score of 6028 points.

Barber scored a personal best 6037 points to win the 2025 UK Athletics Championships heptathlon title on 27 July 2025, the event held at the England Athletics Championships in Birmingham ahead of Anna McCauley.

Barber was named in the British squad for the 2026 World Athletics Indoor Championships in Toruń, Poland.

In May 2026, Barber set a new personal best for the heptathlon with 6169 points at the Hypo-Meeting in Götzis. She was selected to represent England at the 2026 Commonwealth Games in Glasgow, placing fourth overall with a total of 6050 points, narrowly missing a medal by 54 points.

== Personal life ==
From Shepton Mallet, her family have a Somerset farming business, A.J. and R.G. Barber Ltd, and have produced cheddar cheese since 1833, and she works part-time as an estate and property manager for the farm alongside athletics. She is the granddaughter of British racehorse owner Paul Barber, owner of multiple successful racehorses such as See More Business, Clan des Obeaux, and Denman. An experienced horse rider herself, she participated in three-day eventing in her youth. She also he took part in the Markel Magnolia Cup charity horse race at Goodwood Racecourse in 2024. That year, she became an inaugural member of the England Athletics Athlete Panel.
