= Athletics at the 2014 Commonwealth Games – Women's heptathlon =

Women's heptathlon at the Commonwealth Games

The Women's heptathlon at the 2014 Commonwealth Games as part of the athletics programme was held at Hampden Park on 29 and 30 July 2014.

== Results ==
The best score for each event is highlighted.

Rank	Athlete	Points	100 h	HJ	SP	200 m	LJ	JT	800 m
1st place, gold medalist(s)	Brianne Theisen-Eaton (CAN)	6597	13.18 s 1097 (2)	1.84 m 1029 (1)	13.71 m 775 (1)	23.41 s 1038 (1)	6.44 m 988 (1)	43.13 m 727 (3)	2:11.46; 943 (1)
2nd place, silver medalist(s)	Jessica Zelinka (CAN)	6270	12.83 s 1150 (1)	1.69 m 842 (8)	13.65 m 771 (2)	24.00 s 981 (2)	5.91 m 822 (4)	44.9 m 762 (1)	2:11.54; 942 (2)
3rd place, bronze medalist(s)	Jessica Taylor (ENG)	5826 PB	13.81 s 1005 (4)	1.75 m 916 (4)	11.95 m 658 (7)	24.42 s 941 (4)	6.16 m 899 (2)	33.89 m 550 (9)	2:17.59; 857 (6)
4	Sophie Stanwell (AUS)	5754 PB	14.18 s 953 (6)	1.69 m 842 (7)	11.96 m 658 (6)	24.35 s 947 (3)	5.99 m 846 (3)	36.77 m 605 (7)	2:14.28; 903 (4)
5	Salcia Slack (JAM)	5718	14.34 s 931 (7)	1.63 m 771 (9)	12.82 m 715 (3)	24.67 s 917 (5)	5.87 m 810 (5)	44.48 m 753 (2)	2:20.21; 821 (7)
6	Jessica Tappin (ENG)	5695 PB	13.51 s 1049 (3)	1.69 m 842 (5)	11.92 m 656 (8)	24.74 s 911 (6)	5.46 m 688 (7)	36.91 m 608 (6)	2:11.65; 941 (3)
7	Grace Clements (ENG)	5512	14.54 s 903 (8)	1.75 m 916 (2)	12.66 m 705 (4)	27.04 s 708 (11)	5.8 m 789 (6)	41.97 m 705 (4)	2:22.80; 786 (8)
8	Shianne Smith (BER)	5187	14.95 s 848 (9)	1.54 m 666 (11)	11.83 m 650 (9)	25.23 s 866 (8)	5.24 m 626 (10)	38.24 m 634 (5)	2:14.73; 897 (5)
9	Katy Sealy (BIZ)	4661 NR	15.61 s 763 (11)	1.69 m 842 (6)	10.2 m 543 (11)	27.37 s 681 (12)	5.36 m 660 (9)	34.99 m 571 (8)	2:37.61; 601 (9)
10	Anny Oyono (CMR)	4048	16.88 s 610 (12)	1.54 m 666 (12)	11.03 m 597 (10)	26.61 s 745 (10)	4.99 m 557 (12)	20.68 m 302 (11)	2:40.13; 571 (10)
11	Dee-Ann Kentish-Rogers (AIA)	3633	15.49 s 778 (10)	1.57 m 701 (10)	9.27 m 482 (12)	26.44 s 759 (9)	5.15 m 601 (11)	21.25 m 312 (10)	DNF; 0
	Makeba Alcide (LCA)	DNF	13.87 s 997 (5)	1.75 m 916 (3)	12.19 m 674 (5)	25.05 s 882 (7)	5.36 m 660 (8)	DNS	
