= 2022 World Athletics Indoor Championships – Women's pentathlon =

Women's pentathlon at the 2022 World Athletics Indoor Championships
- Venue: Štark Arena
- Dates: 18 March
- Competitors: 12 from 10 nations
- Winning points: 4929

Medalists
gold medal	Noor Vidts	Belgium
silver medal	Adrianna Sułek	Poland
bronze medal	Kendell Williams	United States

The women's pentathlon at the 2022 World Athletics Indoor Championships took place on 18 March 2022.

== Results ==
=== 60 metres hurdles ===
The 60 metres hurdles were started at 9:35.

Rank	Heat	Name	Nationality	Time	Points	Notes
1	2	Noor Vidts	Belgium	8.15	1095	PB
2	2	Holly Mills	Great Britain	8.15	1095	PB
3	2	Kendell Williams	United States	8.20	1084	SB
4	2	Chari Hawkins	United States	8.24	1075	
5	1	Sveva Gerevini	Italy	8.35	1050	PB
6	1	Adrianna Sułek	Poland	8.36	1048	
7	2	Léonie Cambours	France	8.37	1046	
8	2	Katarina Johnson-Thompson	Great Britain	8.45	1028	SB
9	1	Dorota Skřivanová	Czech Republic	8.47	1024	
10	1	Yuliya Loban	Ukraine	8.61	993	
11	1	Claudia Conte	Spain	8.62	991	
12	1	Sarah Lagger	Austria	8.76	961	SB

=== High jump ===
The high jump was started at 11:02.

Rank	Athlete	Nationality	1.62	1.65	1.68	1.71	1.74	1.77	1.80	1.83	1.86	1.89	1.92	Result	Points	Notes	Total
1	Adrianna Sułek	Poland	–	–	–	–	o	o	o	o	o	xo	xxx	1.89	1093	=PB	2141
2	Noor Vidts	Belgium	–	–	o	o	o	o	o	o	xxx			1.83	1016	SB	2111
3	Katarina Johnson-Thompson	Great Britain	–	–	–	–	–	o	xo	o	xxx			1.83	1016	SB	2044
4	Chari Hawkins	United States	–	–	–	o	o	o	xxo	o	xxx			1.83	1016		2091
5	Claudia Conte	Spain	–	–	–	o	o	xo	xxo	xo	xxx			1.83	1016	SB	2007
6	Léonie Cambours	France	–	–	o	o	o	o	o	xxo	xxx			1.83	1016	SB	2062
7	Dorota Skřivanová	Czech Republic	–	o	o	o	xxo	xo	o	xxx				1.80	978	PB	2002
8	Kendell Williams	United States	–	–	–	o	xo	xo	xo	xxx				1.80	978	SB	2062
9	Sarah Lagger	Austria	–	o	o	o	o	o	xxx					1.77	941		1902
10	Yuliya Loban	Ukraine	o	o	o	o	o	xxx						1.74	903		1896
11	Holly Mills	Great Britain	–	–	–	xxo	o	xxx						1.74	903	SB	1998
12	Sveva Gerevini	Italy	o	xo	xo	xxx								1.68	830		1880

=== Shot put ===
The shot put was started at 13:20.

Rank	Name	Nationality	#1	#2	#3	Result	Points	Notes	Total
1	Noor Vidts	Belgium	14.03	13.38	12.80	14.03	796		2907
2	Chari Hawkins	United States	13.00	x	14.02	14.02	795	SB	2886
3	Holly Mills	Great Britain	12.90	13.38	13.68	13.68	773		2771
4	Yuliya Loban	Ukraine	13.46	13.46	13.48	13.48	759		2655
5	Adrianna Sułek	Poland	12.49	x	13.40	13.40	754		2895
6	Sarah Lagger	Austria	13.00	x	13.15	13.15	737		2639
7	Katarina Johnson-Thompson	Great Britain	13.02	x	12.09	13.02	729	SB	2773
8	Dorota Skřivanová	Czech Republic	12.90	12.87	11.95	12.90	721		2723
9	Kendell Williams	United States	x	12.21	12.81	12.81	715	SB	2777
10	Claudia Conte	Spain	12.20	12.73	x	12.73	709	PB	2716
11	Léonie Cambours	France	12.00	10.51	11.41	12.00	661		2723
12	Sveva Gerevini	Italy	11.39	11.52	11.69	11.69	641		2521

=== Long jump ===
The long jump was started at 17:30.

Rank	Name	Nationality	#1	#2	#3	Result	Points	Notes	Total
1	Kendell Williams	United States	6.41	x	6.69	6.69	1069	=CPB	3846
2	Noor Vidts	Belgium	6.60	6.55	6.33	6.60	1040	PB	3947
3	Adrianna Sułek	Poland	6.43	x	6.29	6.43	985	PB	3880
4	Dorota Skřivanová	Czech Republic	6.31	6.19	x	6.31	946		3669
5	Sveva Gerevini	Italy	5.83	x	6.31	6.31	946		3467
6	Holly Mills	Great Britain	x	6.28	6.04	6.28	937		3708
7	Claudia Conte	Spain	6.13	x	5.96	6.13	890	SB	3606
8	Katarina Johnson-Thompson	Great Britain	x	6.08	x	6.08	874	SB	3647
9	Sarah Lagger	Austria	5.89	x	6.01	6.01	853	SB	3492
10	Léonie Cambours	France	5.98	x	x	5.98	843		3566
11	Yuliya Loban	Ukraine	5.71	5.70	5.69	5.71	762		3417
	Chari Hawkins	United States	x	x	x	NM	0		2886

=== 800 metres ===
The 800 metres was started at 19:50.

Rank	Name	Nationality	Time	Points	Notes	Total
1	Noor Vidts	Belgium	2:08.81	982	PB	4929
2	Adrianna Sułek	Poland	2:09.56	971	SB	4851
3	Holly Mills	Great Britain	2:09.97	965	PB	4673
4	Sveva Gerevini	Italy	2:13.77	910		4377
5	Sarah Lagger	Austria	2:14.57	899		4391
6	Dorota Skřivanová	Czech Republic	2:14.73	897	PB	4566
7	Claudia Conte	Spain	2:15.00	893		4499
8	Léonie Cambours	France	2:16.21	876	SB	4442
9	Kendell Williams	United States	2:19.23	834	SB	4680
10	Yuliya Loban	Ukraine	2:23.64	775		4192
	Chari Hawkins	United States	Did not start			
	Katarina Johnson-Thompson	Great Britain	Did not start			

=== Final standings ===
After all events.

Rank	Name	Nationality	Points	Notes
1st place, gold medalist(s)	Noor Vidts	Belgium	4929	NR WL
2nd place, silver medalist(s)	Adrianna Sułek	Poland	4851	NR
3rd place, bronze medalist(s)	Kendell Williams	United States	4680	SB
4	Holly Mills	Great Britain	4673	PB
5	Dorota Skřivanová	Czech Republic	4566	PB
6	Claudia Conte	Spain	4499	PB
7	Léonie Cambours	France	4442	
8	Sarah Lagger	Austria	4391	
9	Sveva Gerevini	Italy	4377	
10	Yuliya Loban	Ukraine	4192	
	Chari Hawkins	United States	Did not finish	
	Katarina Johnson-Thompson	Great Britain	Did not finish	
