= Athletics at the 2022 Commonwealth Games – Women's heptathlon =

Women's heptathlon at the 2022 Commonwealth Games
- Venue: Alexander Stadium
- Dates: 2 – 3 August
- Competitors: 8 from 5 nations
- Winning points: 6377 pts

Medalists
gold medal	Katarina Johnson-Thompson	England
silver medal	Kate O'Connor	Northern Ireland
bronze medal	Jade O’Dowda	England

The women's heptathlon at the 2022 Commonwealth Games, as part of the athletics programme, took place in the Alexander Stadium on 2 and 3 August 2022.

== Records ==
Prior to this competition, the existing world and Games records were as follows:

World record	Jackie Joyner-Kersee (USA)	7291 pts	Seoul, South Korea	23–24 September 1988
Commonwealth record	Katarina Johnson-Thompson (ENG)	6981 pts	Doha, Qatar	2–4 October 2019
Games record	Jane Flemming (AUS)	6695 pts	Auckland, New Zealand	27–28 January 1990

== Schedule ==
The schedule was as follows:

Date	Time	Round
Tuesday 2 August 2022	10:08	100 metres hurdles
Tuesday 2 August 2022	11:15	High jump
Tuesday 2 August 2022	19:15	Shot put
Tuesday 2 August 2022	21:25	200 metres
Wednesday 3 2022	10:50	Long jump
Wednesday 3 2022	19:08	Javelin throw
Wednesday 3 2022	21:00	800 metres

All times are British Summer Time (UTC+1)

== Results ==
Competitors contested a series of 7 events over two days, with their results being converted into points. The final standings were decided by their cumulative points tallies.

=== 100 metres hurdles ===
Results: Wind: -0.4 m/s

Rank	Lane	Athlete	Time	Points	Notes
1	2	Taneille Crase (AUS)	13.42	1062	PB
2	4	Holly Mills (ENG)	13.52	1047	
3	7	Jade O’Dowda (ENG)	13.60	1036	
4	8	Kate O'Connor (NIR)	13.74	1015	PB
5	1	Katarina Johnson-Thompson (ENG)	13.83	1003	
6	5	Lauren Evans (WAL)	13.89	994	
7	3	Anna McCauley (NIR)	14.68	884	
8	6	Edna Boafob (PNG)	16.42	664	

=== High jump ===
Results:

Rank	Athlete	1.36	1.39	1.42	1.45	1.48	1.51	1.54	1.57	1.60	1.63	1.66	1.69	1.72	1.75	1.78	1.81	1.84	1.87	Mark	Points	Notes	Overall
1	Katarina Johnson-Thompson (ENG)	–	–	–	–	–	–	–	–	–	–	–	–	–	o	o	xxo	o	xxx	1.84	1029	SB	2032
2	Holly Mills (ENG)	–	–	–	–	–	–	–	–	–	–	o	o	o	o	o	xxx			1.78	953	SB	2000
3	Taneille Crase (AUS)	–	–	–	–	–	–	–	–	–	–	o	xo	o	xo	xo	xxx			1.78	953		2015
4	Kate O'Connor (NIR)	–	–	–	–	–	–	–	–	–	o	o	o	xo	o	xxo	xxx			1.78	953	SB	1968
5	Jade O’Dowda (ENG)	–	–	–	–	–	–	–	–	o	o	o	o	xo	xo	xxx				1.75	916	PB	1952
6	Anna McCauley (NIR)	–	–	–	–	–	–	–	–	–	o	o	o	xxo	xo	xxx				1.75	916		1800
7	Lauren Evans (WAL)	–	–	–	–	–	–	–	–	–	o	o	o	o	xxx					1.72	879		1873
8	Edna Boafob (PNG)	o	o	o	o	xo	o	xxx												1.51	632	PB	1296

=== Shot put ===
Results:

Rank	Athlete	#1	#2	#3	Mark	Points	Notes	Overall
1	Kate O'Connor (NIR)	13.29	13.65	13.73	13.73	776	SB	2744
2	Jade O’Dowda (ENG)	12.95	13.29	12.72	13.29	747		2699
3	Holly Mills (ENG)	12.98	11.34	12.74	12.98	726		2726
4	Katarina Johnson-Thompson (ENG)	12.94	12.44	12.87	12.94	723	SB	2755
5	Taneille Crase (AUS)	11.35	11.89	11.27	11.89	654	PB	2669
6	Anna McCauley (NIR)	10.95	11.33	11.36	11.36	619		2419
7	Edna Boafob (PNG)	10.14	9.75	9.96	10.14	539	PB	1835
8	Lauren Evans (WAL)	9.67	10.13	10.02	10.13	538		2411

=== 200 metres ===
Results:

Rank	Lane	Athlete	Time	Points	Notes	Overall
1	5	Katarina Johnson-Thompson (ENG)	23.70	1010		3765
2	7	Taneille Crase (AUS)	24.48	935	PB	3604
3	2	Kate O'Connor (NIR)	24.73	912	PB	3656
4	9	Jade O’Dowda (ENG)	25.04	883		3582
5	3	Holly Mills (ENG)	25.12	876		3602
6	8	Anna McCauley (NIR)	25.40	850	SB	3269
7	4	Lauren Evans (WAL)	25.80	815		3226
8	6	Edna Boafob (PNG)	26.15	784		2619

=== Long jump ===
Results:

Rank	Athlete	#1	#2	#3	Mark	Points	Notes	Overall
1	Jade O’Dowda (ENG)	x	6.52	x	6.52	1014		4596
2	Katarina Johnson-Thompson (ENG)	5.61	6.28	6.33	6.33	953		4718
3	Taneille Crase (AUS)	x	6.23	x	6.23	921	PB	4525
4	Holly Mills (ENG)	6.00	6.12	6.19	6.19	908		4510
5	Kate O'Connor (NIR)	5.82	x	5.64	5.82	795		4451
6	Anna McCauley (NIR)	5.68	5.31	5.64	5.68	753	SB	4022
7	Lauren Evans (WAL)	x	5.61	x	5.61	732	SB	3958
8	Edna Boafob (PNG)	4.77	4.76	4.41	4.77	498		3117

=== Javelin throw ===
Results:

Rank	Athlete	#1	#2	#3	Mark	Points	Notes	Overall
1	Kate O'Connor (NIR)	50.83	50.09	51.14	51.14	882		5333
2	Katarina Johnson-Thompson (ENG)	36.19	41.37	44.33	44.33	751	PB	5469
3	Jade O’Dowda (ENG)	42.15	32.82	33.62	42.15	709		5305
4	Holly Mills (ENG)	36.39	38.63	38.25	38.63	641		5151
5	Taneille Crase (AUS)	37.59	x	37.95	37.95	628		5153
6	Anna McCauley (NIR)	34.36	34.87	34.40	34.87	569		4591
7	Edna Boafob (PNG)	30.80	26.38	32.22	32.22	519	PB	3636
8	Lauren Evans (WAL)	30.17	27.11	24.95	30.17	480	SB	4438

=== 800 metres ===
Results

Rank	Athlete	Time	Points	Notes	Overall
1	Holly Mills (ENG)	2:11.42	944		6095
2	Katarina Johnson-Thompson (ENG)	2:13.93	908	SB	6377
3	Jade O’Dowda (ENG)	2:14.00	907	SB	6212
4	Kate O'Connor (NIR)	2:14.48	900	SB	6233
5	Taneille Crase (AUS)	2:16.40	873	PB	6026
6	Anna McCauley (NIR)	2:19.16	835		5426
7	Lauren Evans (WAL)	2:23.89	771		5209
8	Edna Boafob (PNG)	2:53.05	432		4068

== Standings ==
Rank	Athlete	Points	Notes
1st place, gold medalist(s)	Katarina Johnson-Thompson (ENG)	6377	SB
2nd place, silver medalist(s)	Kate O'Connor (NIR)	6233	SB
3rd place, bronze medalist(s)	Jade O’Dowda (ENG)	6212	
4	Holly Mills (ENG)	6095	
5	Taneille Crase (AUS)	6026	PB
6	Anna McCauley (NIR)	5426	
7	Lauren Evans (WAL)	5209	
8	Edna Boafob (PNG)	4068	PB
