= Jessica Taylor (athlete) =

British track and field athlete (born 1988)

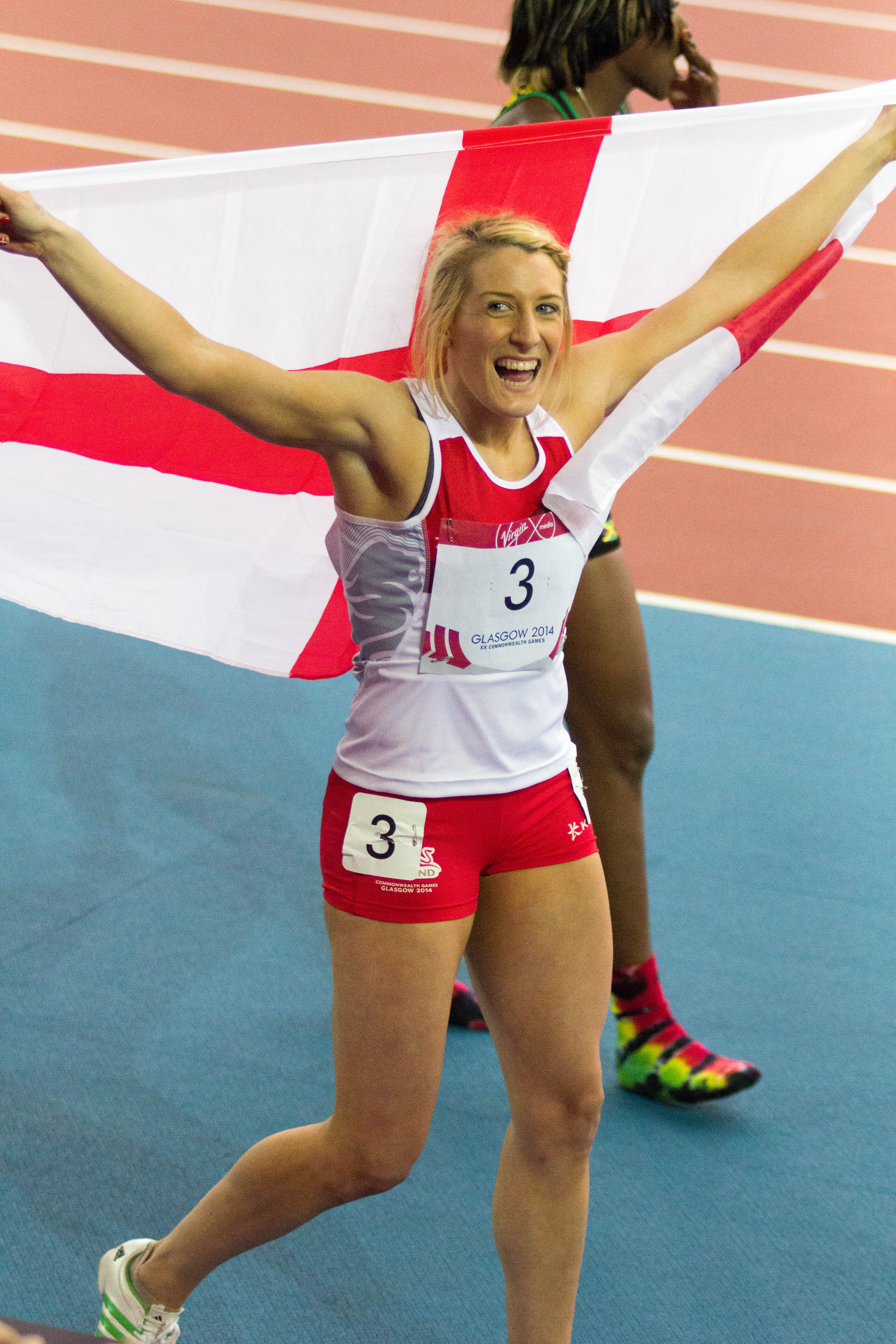
- Jessica Taylor at the 2014 Commonwealth Games

Personal information
- Nationality: British
- Born: 27 July 1988 (age 37)
Medal record
Representing England
Commonwealth Games
Bronze medal – third place	2014 Glasgow	Women's heptathlon
- Updated on 30 July 2014

Jessica Taylor (born 27 June 1988 in Manchester) is a British track and field athlete who competes in the heptathlon. At the 2014 Commonwealth Games held in Glasgow, Taylor represented England and finished third in the women's heptathlon.

In 2015, Taylor scored 6877 points at a women's decathlon in Erith to set the British record in the event.
