= Salcia Slack =

Jamaican athlete

Personal information
- Born: 10 December 1989 (age 36) St. James, Jamaica
- Education: New Mexico Highlands University
- Height: 1.80 m (5 ft 11 in)
- Weight: 77 kg (170 lb)

Sport
- Sport: Track and field
- Event: Heptathlon

Salcia Venecia Slack (born 10 December 1989) is a Jamaican athlete who specialises in the heptathlon. She represented her country at the 2015 World Championships in Beijing without finishing the competition. Her biggest success to date is the fifth place at the 2014 Commonwealth Games.

Her personal bests in the combined events are 6141 points in the heptathlon (Tucson 2015) and 4181 points in the pentathlon (Birmingham, AL 2015).

She has a son, Bendray.

== Competition record ==
Year	Competition	Venue	Position	Event	Notes
Representing Jamaica
2008	World Junior Championships	Bydgoszcz, Poland	20th	Heptathlon	4851 pts
2014	Commonwealth Games	Glasgow, United Kingdom	5th	Heptathlon	5718 pts
2015	Universiade	Gwangju, South Korea	–	Heptathlon	DNF
2015	World Championships	Beijing, China	–	Heptathlon	DNF
2016	World Indoor Championships	Portland, United States	12th	Pentathlon	3377 pts

== Personal bests ==
Outdoor

- 200 metres – 23.92 (0.0 m/s) (Tucson 2015)
- 800 metres – 2:14.34 (Tucson 2015)
- 100 metres hurdles – 13.68 (0.0 m/s) (Tucson 2015)
- High jump – 1.68 (Alamosa 2014)
- Long jump – 6.32(+0.4 m/s) (Grand Valley 2015)
- Triple jump – 13.22 (+1.4 m/s) (Albuquerque 2015)
- Shot put – 14.99 (Tucson 2015)
- Javelin throw – 44.87 (Alamosa 2014)
- Heptathlon – 6141 (Tucson 2015)
- 400m hurdles - 58.24 (Grand Valley 2015)

Indoor

- 800 metres – 2:15.73 (Pittsburgh University 2016)
- 60 metres hurdles – 8.37 (Birmingham 2015)
- High jump – 1.69 (Chadron 2016)
- Long jump – 6.21 (Gunnison 2016)
- Shot put – 14.00 (Golden 2015)
- Pentathlon – 4181 (Birmingham 2015)
