= Chari Hawkins =

American heptathlete (born 1991)

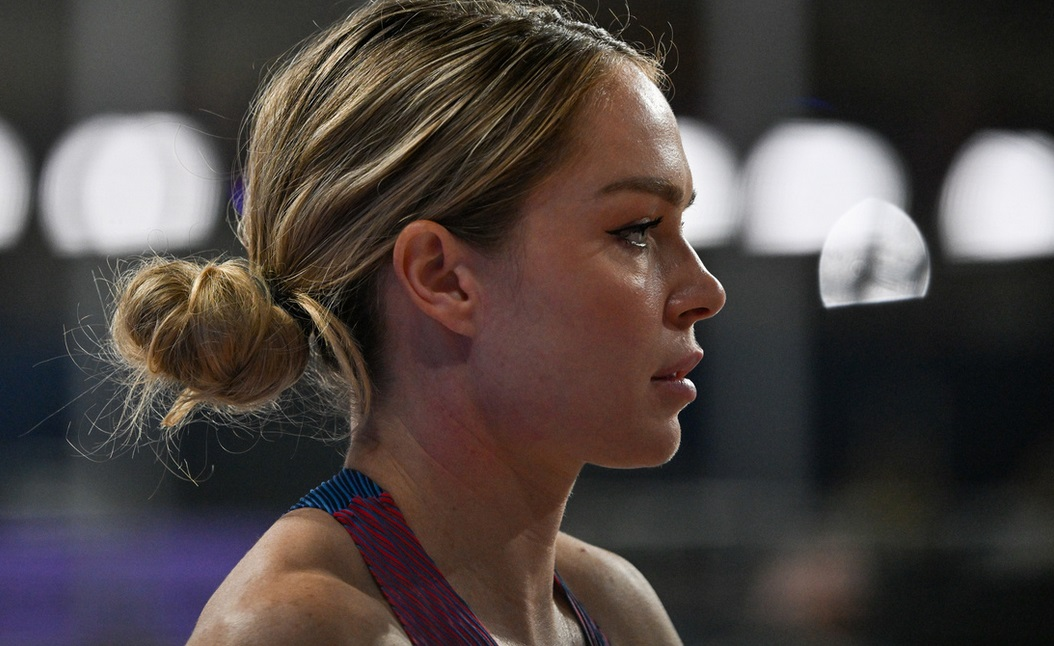
- Hawkins in 2024

Personal information
- Full name: Chari Wanda Hawkins
- Born: May 21, 1991 (age 35) Rexburg, Idaho, U.S.
- Education: Utah State University; University of Bath
- Employer: Brooks
- Height: 5 ft 6 in (168 cm)

Sport
- Country: United States
- Sport: Track and field
- Events: Heptathlon, Pentathlon
- College team: Utah State Aggies; TeamBath
- Turned pro: 2015

Achievements and titles
- Personal bests: Heptathlon: 6456 (Eugene 2024); Pentathlon: 4492 (Spokane 2022); 100 m hurdles: 13.04 (Budapest 2023)

Chari Wanda Hawkins (born May 21, 1991) is an American track and field athlete who competes in combined events. She won the 2022 U.S. Indoor Pentathlon title and has represented the U.S. in the heptathlon at the 2019 World Championships, finishing 12th, and at the 2023 World Championships, finishing 8th.

== Early life and education ==
Hawkins is from Rexburg, Idaho. She attended Madison High School. She studied family consumer science at Utah State. On a Santander scholarship, she completed a Master of Arts in International Education and Globalisation at the University of Bath in the United Kingdom in 2018.

== Athletics career ==
=== University ===
==== Utah State ====
After leaving high school in 2010, Hawkins joined the Utah State University Aggies track and field, where she would compete from 2011 to 2015.

While at Utah State, she qualified for three NCAA Outdoor Championships in the heptathlon placing 11th in 2013, 9th in 2014, and 14th in 2015. She also competed at two NCAA Indoor Championships in the pentathlon, placing 14th in 2014 and 9th in 2015.

==== Bath ====
While pursuing her Masters degree, Hawkins represented TeamBath in British Universities and Colleges Sport (BUCS) competitions, winning long jump gold and 100m hurdles silver. She broke a 30-year record when she won the heptathlon title at the 2018 England Athletics Combined Events Championships.

=== Professional ===
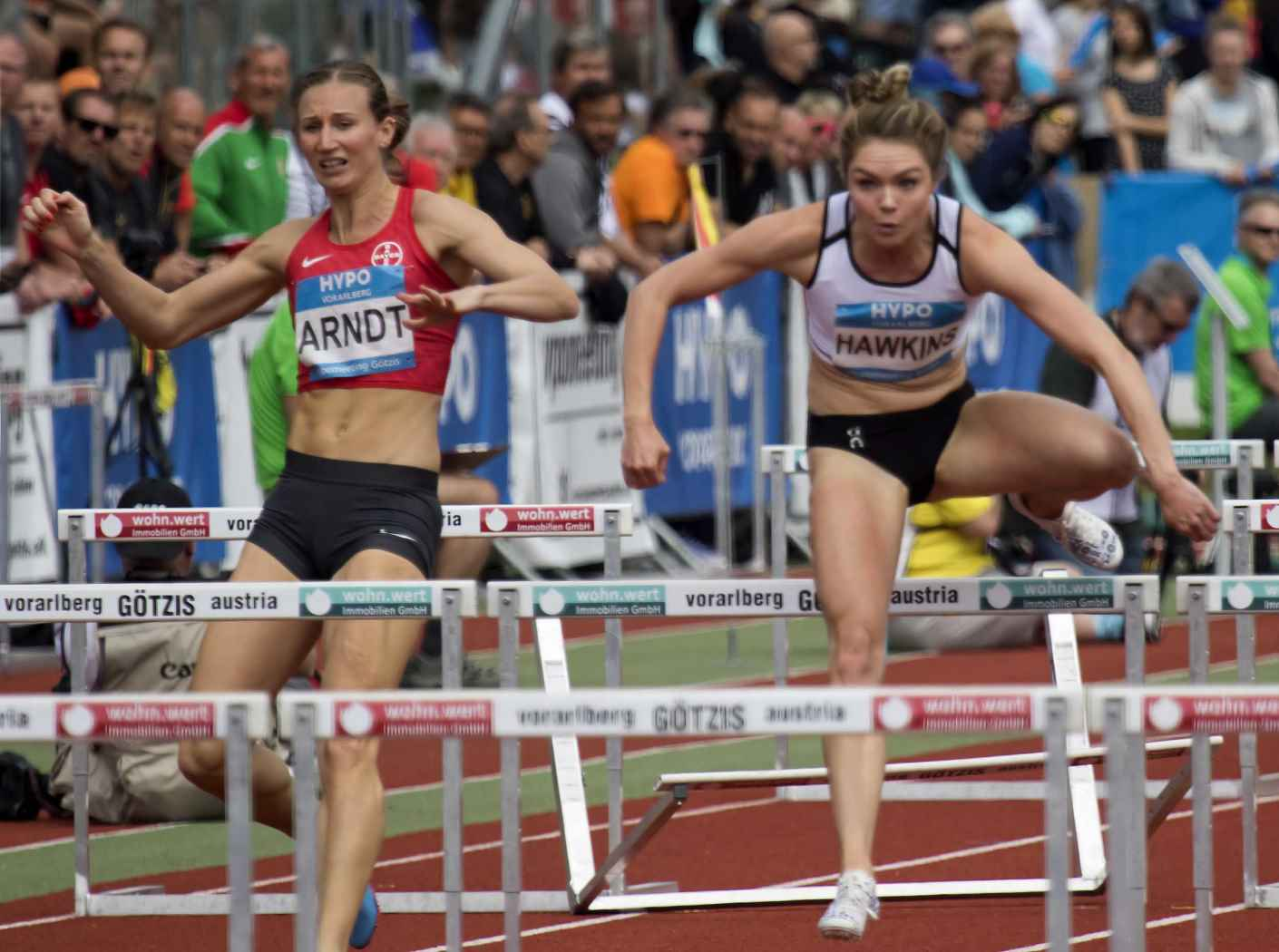
Hawkins (right) at the 2019 Hypo-Meeting

==== 2016 ====
In April 2016, Hawkins set a heptathlon personal best of 5878 at the Bryan Clay Invitational in Azusa, California. Later that year, she competed at the US Olympic Trials, placing 15th.

==== 2019 ====
With a third place finish of 6230 at the 2019 USATF Championships in Des Moines, Iowa, Hawkins qualified for the 2019 World Championships in Doha, where she would go on to place 12th.

==== 2022 ====
At the 2022 USATF Indoor Championships, she won her first national title, setting a Pentathlon personal best of 4492 and qualifying for the World Indoor Championships. At World Indoors in Belgrade, she recorded a no mark in the long jump and did not complete the pentathlon. In June, she earned recognition by USATF for Athlete of the Week for her first-place finish in the heptathlon at the World Athletics Combined Events Tour Gold event held in Arona, Spain where she achieved a personal best with 6,243 points.

==== 2023 ====
In 2023, she made her return to the global championships with an 8th place finish in the Heptathlon at the World Championships in Budapest.

==== 2024 ====
In March 2024, Hawkins placed 7th at the World Indoor Championships. At the US Olympic Trials she achieved a personal best in three events, and a new overall best score of 6,456 points, to place 2nd.

During the second event at the 2024 Summer Olympics, in the High jump, Hawkins failed to clear her first height of 1.71 metres, and scored zero points, putting her out of contention for a Heptathlon medal. She ended up finishing 21st, which was last of all the athletes who completed the seven events.

==== 2025 ====
In 2025 Hawkins ran the London Marathon, changing course after a rough Olympic run. She ran the course in 4:14:30, placing 6670 within the female field and 22142 overall.

== International competitions ==
Year	Competition	Venue	Position	Event	Notes
Representing the United States
2015	Universiade	Gwangju, South Korea	4th	Heptathlon	5707 pts
2019	World Championships	Doha, Qatar	12th	Heptathlon	6073 pts
2022	World Indoor Championships	Belgrade Serbia	–	Pentathlon	DNF
2023	World Championships	Budapest, Hungary	8th	Heptathlon	6366 pts
2024	World Indoor Championships	Glasgow, Scotland	7th	Pentathlon	4388 pts
2024	Olympic Games	Paris, France	21st	Heptathlon	5255 pts

== Personal bests ==
Outdoor

- 200 metres – 24.05 (-0.2 m/s, Eugene 2023)
- 800 metres – 2:14.76 (Eugene 2024)
- 100 metres hurdles – 13.04 (+0.4 m/s, Budapest 2023)
- High jump – 1.85 (Arona 2022)
- Long jump – 6.29 (+0.7 m/s, Long Beach 2019)
- Shot put – 14.67 (Eugene 2024)
- Javelin throw – 49.28 (Eugene 2024)
- Heptathlon – 6456 (Eugene 2024)
- Marathon - 4:14:30 (London 2025)

Indoor

- 800 metres – 2:22.08 (Crete 2016)
- 60 metres hurdles – 8.16 (Glasgow 2024)
- High jump – 1.84 (Spokane 2022)
- Long jump – 6.10 (Albuquerque 2023)
- Shot put – 14.02 (Beograd 2022)
- Pentathlon – 4492 (Spokane 2022)
