= Sam Rush =

English sports admin (born 1972)

Samuel Rush
- Born: 26 March 1972 (age 54) London
- Occupation: Sports administrator, agent, executive
- Citizenship: British

Samuel John Rush (born 26 March 1972 in London) is an English sports administrator, agent and executive who was chief executive at Derby County for almost five years.

== Career ==
A former rugby union player who scored for Oxford University against a Major Stanley's XV, and in front of 71,000 supporters at Twickenham in the 1995 Varsity Match, Rush had spells with Nottingham, Rugby Lions and Saracens.

Rush is a qualified solicitor who began his career at city law firms SJ Berwin, and Bird and Bird.

Rush was the chief operating officer at SFX Sports Group which was acquired for an undisclosed sum in November 2006 by Wasserman Media Group, where he then became president of international business at. In November 2010 he was named the third most influential sports lawyer by Sports Business International magazine. He has also been named as one of the top 50 most influential people in sport by the Times newspaper.

During his career Rush represented David Beckham, including handling his transfer from Manchester United to Real Madrid in 2003.

Rush was appointed as the president and chief executive of Derby County in September 2012, starting the role officially in January 2013.

In November 2014 he was named FC Business Championship chief executive of the year. In October 2015, he signed a new five-year contract at Derby. Chairman Mel Morris stated: “Rush is a big reason for the turnaround in the football club and a main for reason for me having joined the club”.

During his time at the club Derby reached the play-offs final in 2014 and the play-off semi-finals in 2016, and he was described by manager Steve McClaren as “the glue that holds the club together”.

In May 2017 Rush left Derby with both parties later issuing claims for breach of contract. In March 2018 an employment tribunal found that Rush had been unfairly dismissed by Derby County. In October 2018, Derby County issued a statement saying the two parties had settled their respective differences on agreed terms.

Rush had a spell as CEO of 366 Group and is now chief executive and director at sports management firm General Sports Worldwide (GSW) after they acquired the 366 Group in 2020. GSW specialises in athlete talent representation, club consultancy services, team mergers and acquisitions and executive search.

Rush has also held long term roles as a board member of the Amateur Boxing Association and as Treasurer of the British Association for Sport and Law.

== Personal life ==
Rush is married to Caroline with children Ella, an international heptathlete, and Johnny, residing in Derbyshire and London. His son Johnny is a Gibraltar U21 international footballer.
