= 2021 World Athletics U20 Championships – Women's heptathlon =

Women's heptathlon at the 2021 World Athletics U20 Championships
- Venue: Kasarani Stadium
- Dates: 18–19 August
- Competitors: 8 from 7 nations
- Winning points: 5997

Medalists
| gold medal | Saga Vanninen | Finland |
| silver medal | Pippi Lotta Enok | Estonia |
| bronze medal | Szabina Szűcs | Hungary |

The women's heptathlon at the 2021 World Athletics U20 Championships was held at the Kasarani Stadium on 18 and 19 August.

== Records ==
Standing records prior to the 2021 World Athletics U20 Championships
| World U20 Record | Carolina Klüft (SWE) | 6542 | Munich, Germany | 10 August 2002 |
| Championship Record | Carolina Klüft (SWE) | 6470 | Kingston, Jamaica | 20 July 2002 |
| World U20 Leading | Saga Vanninen (FIN) | 6271 | Tallinn, Estonia | 16 July 2021 |

== Results ==
The highest mark recorded in each event is highlighted in yellow

| Rank | Athlete | Nationality | 100m H | HJ | SP | 200m | LJ | JT | 800m | Points | Notes |
|---|---|---|---|---|---|---|---|---|---|---|---|
| 1st place, gold medalist(s) | Saga Vanninen | Finland | 13.60 | 1.78 SB | 13.30 | 24.83 PB | 5.98 | 49.22 PB | 2:31.79 | 5997 | |
| 2nd place, silver medalist(s) | Pippi Lotta Enok | Estonia | 14.28 PB | 1.75 PB | 10.81 | 24.59 PB | 5.98 | 44.12 | 2:22.27 | 5746 | PB |
| 3rd place, bronze medalist(s) | Szabina Szűcs | Hungary | 14.61 | 1.72 | 11.45 | 25.33 | 6.04 | 43.05 PB | 2:19.48 PB | 5674 | PB |
| 4 | Sophie Kreiner | Austria | 14.51 PB | 1.78 | 12.48 | 25.04 PB | 5.68 PB | 37.96 PB | 2:19.14 PB | 5652 | PB |
| 5 | Klara Koščak | Croatia | 14.12 | 1.60 | 10.80 PB | 25.39 | 6.13 | 40.84 PB | 2:27.00 | 5434 | |
| 6 | Atėnė Šliževičiūtė | Lithuania | 14.57 | 1.78 | 9.93 | 26.07 | 5.92 | 33.08 PB | 2:17.31 | 5388 | |
| 7 | Valeriya Mukhobrod | Ukraine | 14.74 | 1.66 | 10.48 PB | 25.54 | 5.63 | 40.81 PB | 2:19.43 | 5333 | |
| 8 | Neea Käyhkö | Finland | 16.93 | 1.72 | 10.81 | 25.66 | 4.59 | 34.80 | 2:36.75 | 4523 | |
