= Kate O'Connor (athlete) =

Irish athlete (born 2000)

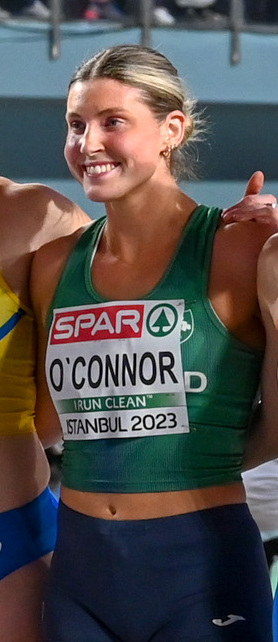
- O'Connor in 2023

Personal information
- Nationality: Irish
- Born: 12 December 2000 (age 25) Newry, Northern Ireland
- Home town: Dundalk, County Louth, Ireland

Sport
- Country: Ireland; Northern Ireland
- Sport: Track and field
- Events: Heptathlon, indoor pentathlon
- Club: Dundalk St Gerard's
- Coached by: Michael O'Connor

Achievements and titles
- Personal bests: Heptathlon: 6751 pts NR; Indoor pentathlon: 4839 pts NR
Medal record
Representing Ireland
World Championships
Silver medal – second place	2025 Tokyo	Heptathlon
World Indoor Championships
Silver medal – second place	2025 Nanjing	Pentathlon
Bronze medal – third place	2026 Toruń	Pentathlon
European Championships
Gold medal – first place	2026 Birmingham	Heptathlon
European Indoor Championships
Bronze medal – third place	2025 Apeldoorn	Pentathlon
Summer World University Games
Gold medal – first place	2025 Bochum	Heptathlon
European Athletics U20 Championships
Silver medal – second place	2019 Borås	Heptathlon
Representing Northern Ireland
Commonwealth Games
Gold medal – first place	2026 Glasgow	Heptathlon
Silver medal – second place	2022 Birmingham	Heptathlon

Katherine O'Connor (born 12 December 2000) is an Irish track and field athlete who competes in the heptathlon and indoor pentathlon for Ireland and Northern Ireland. As of July 2026, O'Connor is the Irish record holder for heptathlon and indoor pentathlon, and both the 2026 European champion and the 2026 Commonwealth Games champion in the former.

A European medalist for Ireland at the under-20 age-grade level in 2019, she came to senior prominence by winning a silver medal in the heptathlon at the 2022 Commonwealth Games, representing Northern Ireland.

In 2025 she achieved a breakthrough year, winning four senior international medals across the indoor and outdoor season. She won a bronze medal in the Pentathlon at the 2025 European Indoor Championships, setting a new national record, and a silver at the World Indoor Championships a few weeks later. In the summer, she took gold in the 2025 World University Games, the Universiade in heptathlon. In September 2025, O'Connor won a Heptathlon silver medal at the 2025 World Athletics Championships.

In 2026, her run of success continued as she won a bronze medal representing Ireland in the indoor pentathlon at the 2026 World Athletics Indoor Championships before winning the gold medal in the 2026 Commonwealth Games heptathlon, once more representing Northern Ireland, and only days later the gold medal in the heptathlon at the 2026 European Athletics Championships. O'Connor was the first woman to win both these titles in the same year since Denise Lewis in 1998.

== Career ==
O'Connor has been coached since childhood by her father Michael.

O'Connor was born in Newry, County Down in Northern Ireland, but raised in the neighbouring town of Dundalk, County Louth in the Republic of Ireland, around 12 miles from her birthplace. At 17, she competed for Northern Ireland at the 2018 Commonwealth Games, finishing eighth in the heptathlon.

She won a silver in the heptathlon at the 2019 European Athletics U20 Championships in Borås, Sweden.

O'Connor won a silver medal competing in the heptathlon at the 2022 Commonwealth Games, her first senior medal, behind Katarina Johnson-Thompson.

She qualified for the heptathlon at the 2023 World Athletics Championships, finishing in 13th place.

O'Connor became the first Irish heptathlete to compete at an Olympics when she finished 14th at the 2024 Summer Olympics; her javelin throw was the 3rd best in the competition.

She set a new Irish indoor pentathlon record of 4,683 points at the Tallinn Combined Events meeting in Estonia in February 2025.

O'Connor won a bronze medal in the pentathlon at the 2025 European Athletics Indoor Championships after winning the 800m race, setting 4 new personal bests in the long jump, high jump, 60m hurdles and in the 800m.

She claimed a silver medal in the pentathlon at the 2025 World Athletics Indoor Championships in Nanjing, China.

She became World University Games champion in 2025.

O'Connor won a silver medal in the heptathlon at the 2025 World Athletics Championships in Tokyo, Japan, setting a new national record of 6,714 points in the process and registering five personal bests across the seven events.

In March 2026, O'Connor won a bronze medal in the pentathlon at the 2026 World Athletics Indoor Championships in a new Irish record score of 4839 points.

She won gold representing Northern Ireland at the 2026 Commonwealth Games in heptathlon, 291 points ahead of Great Britain's Jade O'Dowda in second. 17 days later, she won gold again, this time for Ireland at the 2026 European championships in the heptathlon, edging Netherlands' Emma Oosterwegel by 38 points in a new national record of 6,751 points. The win in Birmingham brought her run of successive medals in successive combined events competition to seven.

== Personal life ==
O'Connor began studying at Sheffield Hallam University in 2019 and graduated in 2022 with a degree in sport development with coaching. O'Connor completed a master's degree in Communication and Public Relations at Ulster University in 2025 and graduated in Belfast in December 2025.

Although raised in Dundalk and a member of Saint Gerard's Athletic Club, O'Connor was born in the nearby city of Newry, in County Down, Northern Ireland. She is therefore eligible by birth to represent Northern Ireland at the Commonwealth Games. As athletes from Northern Ireland are automatically eligible to represent either the Great Britain & Northern Ireland team, or Ireland in World Athletics events, representing Northern Ireland does not affect her eligibility to represent Ireland in other competitions.

== Personal bests ==
Indoor & Outdoor
Event	Record	Points	Date
60m Hurdles	8.21	1113	20 February 2026
Long Jump	6.55m	1119	15 August 2026
800m (indoor)	2:10.26	961	22 March 2026
200m (indoor)	25.06	987	17 February 2018
Pentathlon	4839 NR		22 March 2026
100m Hurdles	13.30	1109	14 August 2026
High Jump	1.86m	1082	19 September 2025
200m	23.79*	1036	14 August 2026
800m	2:09.56	997	20 September 2025
Javelin	53.06m	950	20 September 2025
Shot Put	14.70m	841	22 March 2026
Heptathlon	6751 NR		15 August 2026
