= Maddie Wilson =

New Zealand athlete (born 2002)

Personal information
- Born: 5 April 2002 (age 24)

Sport
- Sport: Athletics
- Event: Heptathlon

Achievements and titles
- Personal best: Heptathlon: 6059 (2026)

Maddie Wilson (born 5 April 2002) is a New Zealand heptathlete. She is a two-time national champion of heptathlon, and has also won a national title in the long jump.

== Biography ==
Wilson was born on 5 April 2002. She took up athletics at Gisborne Athletic Club. She also took part in beach sprinting for the Waikanae club. Wilson set a New Zealand under-18 record in heptathlon won a gold medal at the Oceania Athletics U18 Championships in Townsville, at the age of 17 years-old, with a personal best score of 5179 points.

Wilson was runner-up in the high jump at the 2023 New Zealand Track and Field Championships in Wellington. She also placed runner-up in the heptathlon at the NZ Combined Events Championships that year, with a score of 5,235 Points in Whanganui.

Wilson won the 2024 New Zealand heptathlon title, setting a personal best in all seven events to score 5990 points in Dunedin in February 2024.

Wilson won the long jump title at the 2025 New Zealand Athletics Championships. Wilson scored 5873 points competing in the heptathlon at the Hypo-Meeting in Gotzis, Austria on 1 June 2025. Wilson placed seventh in the heptathlon at the 2025 Summer World University Games in Bochum, Germany.

Wilson won the heptathlon title at the 2026 New Zealand Combined Events Championships in March 2026, with a total score of 6059 points, to win ahead of defending champion Briana Stephenson, who also scored over 6000 points. In May 2026, Wilson competed at the Hypo-Meeting in Götzis, placing eighteenth overall with 6021 points. She placed fifth overall in heptathlon at the 2026 Commonwealth Games in Glasgow, Scotland.

== Personal life ==
Her boyfriend is fellow international athlete Hamish Kerr.
