= Briana Stephenson =

New Zealand athlete (born 1999)

Personal information
- Born: 23 October 1999 (age 26) Pukekohe, New Zealand

Sport
- Sport: Athletics
- Event: Heptathlon

Achievements and titles
- Personal best: Heptathlon: 6096 (2026)

Briana Stephenson (born 23 October 1999) is a New Zealand multi-event athlete. She has won national championship titles in heptathlon, long jump and 100 metres hurdles.

== Biography ==
From Central Hawke's Bay, Stephenson is Māori; her iwi affiliation are Ngāti Kahungunu and Tainui. She attended Napier Girls' High School and played netball for the New Zealand Schools before focusing on track and field with her father William as coach. She later moved to Auckland to complete a Bachelor in Science in Physiology, and worked with long jump coach Matt Wyatt. Stephenson won the long jump title at the 2020 New Zealand Athletics Championships with a jump of 6.08 metres.

Following knee surgery in January 2022, Stephenson switched focus into the seven-event discipline of heptathlon in order to mix-up her training and reduce repetitive strain on certain parts of her body. Completing her first heptathlon in January 2023 she scored 5127 points.

Stephenson won the 100 metres hurdles title at the 2024 New Zealand Championships in Wellington with a time of 13.94 seconds. In March 2025, she retained the 100 metres hurdles title at the 2025 New Zealand Championships in Dunedin, with a time of 13.30 seconds. Later that month, she won the heptathlon at the New Zealand Combined Events Championships with 5985 points.

Stephenson set a new personal best for heptathlon with 6098 points, breaking the 6000-point barrier for the first time, in January 2026 at the Queensland championships in Brisbane. She won the long jump and 100 metres hurdles titles again at the 2026 New Zealand Championships in Auckland. Later that month, she finished runner-up to Maddie Wilson at the 2026 New Zealand Combined Events Championships with 6002 points. She was selected to represent New Zealand and placed ninth in heptathlon at the 2026 Commonwealth Games in Glasgow, Scotland.

== Personal life ==
Outside athletics, she works in administration for a sports equipment business founded by her partner Rob Reynolds, a former professional tennis player.
