= Sienna MacDonald =

Canadian hurdler (born 2002)

Personal information
- Born: 15 August 2002 (age 23)

Sport
- Sport: Athletics
- Event: Heptathlon

Achievements and titles
- Personal bests: 60m: 7.52 (Regina, 2025); 100m: 12.03 (Calgary, 2023); 200m: 24.76 (Calgary, 2024); 800m: 2:23.58 (Langley, 2022); 60m hurdles: 7.97 (Edmonton, 2025); 100m hurdles: 12.97 (Götzis, 2025); Long jump: 6.27m (Tucson, 2024); High jump 1.71m (Edmonton, 2025); Javelin: 45.19m (Calgary, 2024); Shot put: 12.82m (Calgary, 2024); Pentathlon 4159 (Edmonton, 2025); Heptathlon 6148 (Götzis, 2025)
Medal record
Women's athletics
Representing Canada
Pan American Championships
Silver medal – second place	2026 Medellín	Heptathlon

Sienna MacDonald (born 15 August 2002) is a Canadian multi-event athlete. She was Canadian national champion in the heptathlon in 2022 and 2025 and the silver medalist at the 2026 Pan American Championships.

== Early life ==
She is from Airdrie, Alberta and attended George McDougall High School. She participated in a number of sports including gymnastics, basketball and soccer whilst growing up, before focusing on athletics. She placed second in both the U18 100 metres hurdles and the heptathlon at the Legion Nationals in 2019 in Nova Scotia.

== Career ==
She won the 60 metres hurdles at the Simplot Games in 2020, and won at the 2022 Canadian Track and Field Championships in the heptathlon in June 2022, with a personal best score of 5643 points.

A student at the University of Calgary, she competes on a collegiate level for the Calgary Dinos. She won three individual gold medals at the 2024 U Sports Championships, winning the women's pentathlon by a margin of 370 points, setting a new personal record of 4,164 points, and also winning the women’s long jump and women’s 60m hurdles. She was only the second female athlete, after Jessica Zelinka in 2007, to win three gold medals at the event. She was named Canada West Women's Track Athlete of the Year in 2024.

In February 2025, competing at the Annual Pandas Open in Alberta she set a personal best in the 60m hurdles, running 7.97 seconds in the preliminary round and backed-it-up in the event’s final to win in 8.00 seconds. Her previous best was 8.11 seconds. In the same weekend, she won the long jump with a jump of 6.23m and placed third in the high jump.

She was selected for the 60 metres hurdles at the 2025 World Athletics Indoor Championships in Nanjing in March 2025. She lowered her 100m hurdles personal best to 12.97 seconds at the Hypo-Meeting in Götzis on 31 May 2025, where she went on to set a new heptathlon personal best of 6148 points.

In March 2026, she ran in the 60 metres hurdles at the 2026 World Athletics Indoor Championships in Toruń, Poland, reaching the semi-finals. In June, she won the silver medal in the heptathlon at the inaugural 2026 Pan American Championships in Medellín, with a score of 5974 points. MacDonald placed tenth in heptathlon at the 2026 Commonwealth Games in Glasgow, Scotland.
