= Mia Scerri =

Australian athlete (born 2005)

Personal information
- Born: 26 March 2005 (age 21)

Sport
- Sport: Athletics
- Event: Multi-event

Achievements and titles
- Personal best: Heptathlon: 6175 (2026)

Mia Scerri (born 26 March 2005) is an Australian multi-event athlete. She won the heptathlon title at the Australian Athletics Championships in 2026.

== Biography ==
From Victoria, Scerri won Australian age-group combined events titles at under-15 level in 2019 and under-16 level in 2020.

A student at Monash University in Melbourne, Scerri set a personal best in the heptathlon of 5537 points in April 2023. She placed twelfth overall in the heptathlon at the delayed 2021 Summer World University Games held in August 2023 in Chengdu, China, with 5531 points.

Scerri won the heptathlon at the 2023 Pacific Games setting a new championship record and personal best of 5624 points. The following year, as an 18 year-old, Scerri won the Australian under-20 heptathlon title with a score 5429 points. She was selected to compete for Australia at the 2024 World Athletics U20 Championships in Lima, Peru, and was laying third overall with one event to go, before ultimately placing fourth overall, 51 points behind the bronze medal on 5550 points.

In July 2025, she competed for Australia at the 2025 Summer World University Games, placing in ninth place overall on 5651 points.

In April 2026, Scerri produced her biggest ever day-one score to lead experienced compatriots Tori West and Camryn Newton-Smith after four events at the senior Australian Athletics Championships, jumping career-best 1.81m in the high jump and setting a personal best 14.69m in the shot put to finish the day on 3783 points, a lead of 114 points. The following day she was crowned senior Australian champion for the first time scoring 6175 points having set personal bests in five of the seven events. She placed seventh overall in heptathlon at the 2026 Commonwealth Games in Glasgow, Scotland.
