= Allie Jones (heptathlete) =

American heptathlete (born 2001)

- Jones in 2024

Personal information
- Born: 29 June 2001 (age 25)

Sport
- Sport: Athletics
- Event: Heptathlon

Achievements and titles
- Personal bests: Heptathlon: 6367 (Götzis, 2025); Pentathlon: 4528 (Fayeteville, 2024)

Allie Jones (born 29 June 2001) is an American multi-event athlete.

== Early life ==
She is from California and attended San Marcos High School where she competed as a multi-event athlete. She attended Stanford University prior to transferring to the University of Southern California as a graduate student.

== Career ==
She was runner-up competing for Stanford at the 2021 Pac-12 championships in the heptathlon, moving into second place on Stanford’s all-time heptathlon points list with a personal best score of 5727 points in California.

She won the Pac-12 women's heptathlon competition in 2022 with 5731 points. She placed fourth overall in the heptathlon at the 2022 NCAA Outdoor Division 1 Championships in Eugene, Oregon, with 5823 points.

She finished second overall behind Jadin O'Brien in the pentathlon at the 2023 NCAA Indoor Division 1 Championships. She won the Mt. SAC Relays in 2023, breaking the USC school record for the heptathlon held previously by Wendy Brown from 1988, with 6,217 points. She retained the PAC-12 title in 2023, setting a school record and personal best tally of 6234 points, three event personal bests whilst winning four of the seven events.

She placed ninth in the heptathlon at the 2024 Hypo-Meeting in Götzis, Austria with a tally of 6185 points. She finished fifth overall at the US Olympic Trials in the heptathlon competition, in Eugene, Oregon in June 2024, with 6199 points. She finished second behind Serina Riedel of Germany whilst representing the United States in the heptathlon at the Thorpe Cup in July 2024, scoring 6062 points.

She placed sixth in the heptathlon at the 2025 Hypo-Meeting in Götzis with a personal best 6367 points. She placed third overall in the heptathlon at the 2025 USA Outdoor Track and Field Championships, finishing behind Anna Hall and Taliyah Brooks on 6164 points. She placed sixth overall in the season-long World Athletics Combined Events Tour for 2025.
