= Anna McCauley =

Irish and Northern Irish heptathlete (born 2001)

Personal information
- Nationality: Ireland, Northern Ireland
- Born: 2 January 2001 (age 25)

Sport
- Sport: Athletics
- Event: Heptathlon

Achievements and titles
- Personal bests: Heptathlon: 6069 (Landquart, 2026); Pentathlon: 4333 (Tallinn, 2026)

Anna McCauley (born 2 January 2001) is a multi-event athlete who represents Ireland and Northern Ireland. She won the pentathlon at the England Athletics Senior Indoor Combined Event Championships in 2025 and 2026, and placed sixth in the heptathlon competing for Northern Ireland at the 2022 Commonwealth Games.

== Biography ==
McCauley is a City of Lisburn AC and City of Sheffield and Dearne AC athlete and trained with John Lane's international combined events group, and has changed training setup in 2025 returning home to Ireland. She competed at the Commonwealth Youth Games in the hurdles, before focusing on combined events.

McCauley placed sixth overall representing Northern Ireland in the women's heptathlon at the 2022 Commonwealth Games in Birmingham, England.

In January 2024, McCauley was runner-up to Abigail Pawlett with a personal best of 4118 lounge at the England Athletics Combined Event Championships in Sheffield in the pentathlon. She placed third at the 2024 British Athletics Championships in Birmingham, with a tally of 5363 points.

In 2025, McCauley won the pentathlon at the England Athletics Senior Indoor Combined Event Championships in Sheffield. In June, competing at the Europol meeting in Poland, McCauley finished third in the heptathlon with a new personal best of 5621 points. This also placed her fourth on the Irish all-time list. She scored a new lifetime best of 5663 points to place second behind Ellen Barber in the 2025 UK Athletics Championships heptathlon on 27 July 2025, the event held as part of the England Athletics Championships in Birmingham.

On 18 January 2026, McCauley retained the pentathlon title at the England Athletics Senior Indoor Combined Event Championships, with a new personal best tally of 4250 points, finishing ahead of France's Ysee Le Philppe. The following month, she improved to 4333 points whilst competing in Tallinn, Estonia. In May 2026, she became the second Irish woman to break the 6000 points barrier in heptathlon, scoring 6069 points to win at the Mehrkampf Meeting in Switzerland.

McCauley was named in the Northern Ireland team for the 2026 Commonwealth Games in Glasgow. She finished 8th in heptathlon with a score of 5994 points.

== Personal Bests ==
Event	Record	Date
60m Hurdles	8.48	28 February 2026
Long Jump	6.23m	29 July 2026
800m (indoor)	2:15.18	1 February 2026
200m (indoor)	25.24	13 March 2016
High Jump	1.79m	11 May 2024
Shot Put	12.98m	02 May 2026
Pentathlon	4333	1 February 2026
100m Hurdles	13.70	28 July 2026
200m	24.07	23 May 2026
800m	2:10.54	24 May 2026
Javelin	39.35m	24 May 2026
Heptathlon	6069	24 May 2026

== Personal life ==
She is coached in-part by her mother, Maureen. Alongside her athletics career, McCauley attended university in Sheffield. Having completed a PGCE, she works as a supply primary school teacher in Belfast.
