= Szabina Szűcs =

Hungarian athlete (born 2002)

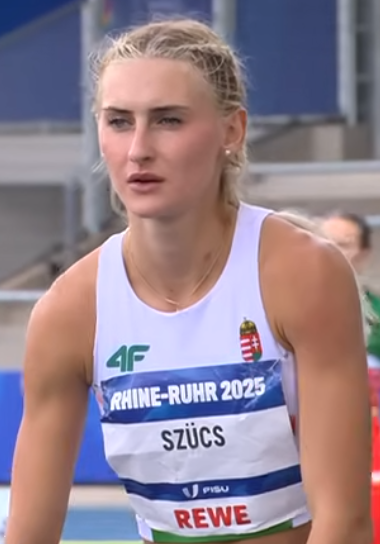
- At the 2025 Summer World University Games

Personal information
- Nationality: Hungarian
- Born: 4 February 2002 (age 24)

Sport
- Sport: Athletics
- Event: Heptathlon

Achievements and titles
- Personal bests: Pentathlon 4618 (Toruń, 2026); Heptathlon: 6081 (Bochum, 2025)
Medal record
Women's athletics
Representing Hungary
Summer World University Games
Silver medal – second place	2025 Bochum	Heptathlon
World U20 Championships
Bronze medal – third place	2021 Nairobi	Heptathlon

Szabina Szűcs (born 4 February 2002) is a Hungarian multi-event athlete. She is a multiple-time Hungarian national champion in events such as the heptathlon, pentathlon and triple jump. She won the silver medal in heptathlon at the 2025 World University Games and placed fifth and sixth at the 2026 and 2025 World Athletics Indoor Championships in the indoor pentathlon.

== Biography ==
A member of Kecskemét Athletics and Rugby Club, Szűcs gained her first international experience at the 2018 European Athletics U18 Championships in Győr, Hungary. She won the 2020 Hungarian Athletics Championships in the triple jump.

Szűcs competed in the heptathlon at the 2021 European Athletics U20 Championships in Tallinn, Estonia, and was a bronze medalist at the 2021 World Athletics U20 Championships in Nairobi, Kenya, in the heptathlon with a personal best score of 5674.

In January 2024, she broke Xénia Krizsán's Hungarian U23 record in the pentathlon, and then further improved her record and winning the national championship at the Hungarian Indoor Athletics Championships, with a total tally of 4,588 points, jumping to an early second place in the world rankings for the year. She was subsequently selected to compete at the 2024 World Athletics Indoor Championships in Glasgow, Scotland, in which she finished tenth overall. That summer, she finished in sixteenth place overall in the heptathlon at the 2024 European Athletics Championships in Rome, Italy, in June 2024.

Coached by Attila Zsivoczky, she was selected for the 2025 World Athletics Indoor Championships in Nanjing, China, and achieved her best international result, finishing in sixth overall, recovering successfully from a slow start to the competition which saw her initially in eleventh place. She won a silver medal in the heptathlon at the 2025 World University Games in Germany in July 2025 with a personal best 6081 points.

Szűcs was selected for the pentathlon at the 2026 World Athletics Indoor Championships in Toruń, Poland, placing fifth overall with a personal best tally of 4618 points. In August, she competed at the 2026 European Athletics Championships in Birmingham, England, in heptathlon. She finished the season placed eighth in the 2026 World Athletics Combined Events Tour rankings.
