= Tori West =

Australian athlete (born 1995)

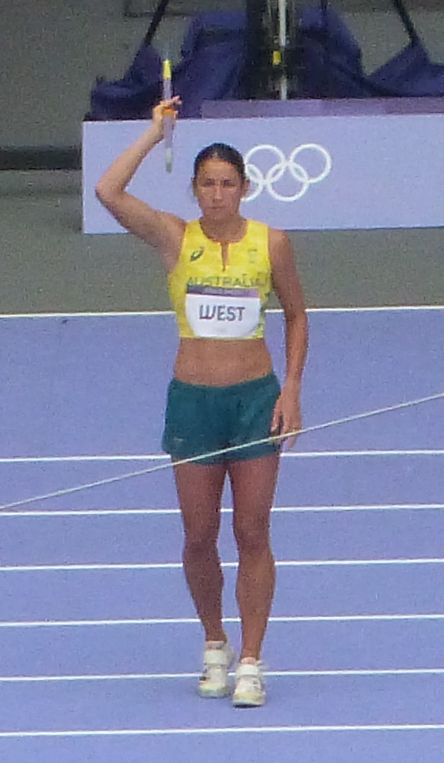
- West competing at the 2024 Olympic Games

Personal information
- Nationality: Australian
- Born: 14 October 1995 (age 31)

Sport
- Sport: Athletics
- Event: Heptathlon

Achievements and titles
- Personal bests: Heptathlon: 6245 (Gotzis, 2024)
Medal record
Women's athletics
Representing AUS
Commonwealth Games
Bronze medal – third place	2026 Glasgow	Heptathlon
Oceania Championships
Silver medal – second place	2024 Suva	Heptathlon

Tori West (born 14 October 1995) is an Australian multi-event athlete. She represented Australia in heptathlon at the 2024 Olympic Games and 2025 World Athletics Championships and won the bronze medal at the 2026 Commonwealth Games.

== Biography ==
West is from Townsville in Queensland. A talented junior across multiple sports, West competed at State Titles at age 11 in the High Jump, became an U18 National Champion in Javelin, and briefly competed as a boxer winning the Queensland 69 kg State Championship in 2017 before retiring undefeated with a 4-0 record. Retiring from boxing to focus on athletics, West set a goal of qualifying for the 2018 Commonwealth Games being held in her home State of Queensland, ultimately ranking 2nd in Australia but falling short of qualification. West attended the University of Queensland and competed at the 2019 Summer Universiade in Naples.

In January 2020, she won the heptathlon at the Australian combined events championships in Brisbane with a tally of 6028 points, becoming the first Australian to break the 6,000 point mark in 13 years.

After several seasons of injury and COVID-related interruptions, West was runner-up at the 2024 Australian Athletics Championships in April 2024. Still on the outside of qualification for the upcoming Olympic Games, West set a personal best score of 6245 to finish sixth at the Hypo-Meeting in Götzis in May 2024, followed by a silver medal at the 2024 Oceania Athletics Championships in Suva, Fiji in June 2024. During this period, West achieved personal bests in 6 of the 7 heptathlon events. In July 2024, she was selected for the heptathlon at the 2024 Paris Olympics. She finished 20th, with 5848 points. She finished eighth overall in the 2024 World Athletics Combined Events Tour.

West regained her national title, winning the heptathlon at the Australian Athletics Championships in Perth on 12 April 2025. In September 2025, she competed at the 2025 World Athletics Championships in Tokyo, Japan, finishing in seventeenth place.

On 10 April, West scored 6162 points to finish second in heptathlon at the 2026 Australian Championships, 13 points behind Mia Scerri. On 29 July, West scored 6104 points to win the bronze medal at the 2026 Commonwealth Games in Glasgow, Scotland.
