= Ella Rush =

British athlete (born 2004)

Personal information
- Born: 8 April 2004 (age 22) London, England

Sport
- Sport: Athletics
- Events: Heptathlon, Pentathlon

Ella Rush (born 8 April 2004) is a British-born multi-event athlete. She won the senior British pentathlon title in 2022. From 2026 she represents Gibraltar.

== Biography ==
Born in London, Rush is of Gibraltarian descent. She was later based in Derbyshire where she joined Amber Valley and Erewash athletics club. Rush is eligible to represent Gibraltar, her mother Caroline's birthplace. From a sporting family, her father Sam Rush was a professional rugby union player. Her brother Johnny Rush is an international footballer for the Gibraltar national football team.

Rush represented Great Britain at under-18 level in the long jump for the first time in 2021. Rush set the UK age-17 long jump record at 6.34 metres. She also studied and competed at the University of Georgia in the United States from 2022. Rush won the British indoor pentathlon title in February 2022. She finished sixth in heptathlon at the 2022 World Athletics U20 Championships in Cali, Colombia.

In November 2024, she was named by British Athletics on the Olympic Futures Programme for 2025. She placed third overall in heptathlon in July 2025 at the England Athletics Championships in Birmingham, with a score of 5464 points.

Rush began to represent Gibraltar in international competition in March 2026. Rush subsequently set three Gibraltar national records in the first month of eligibility, in the long jump, the 200 metres and the 100 metres hurdles. In May, Rush placed second in heptathlon at the 2026 Southeastern Conference Outdoor Championships, and qualified for the heptathlon at the 2026 NCAA Outdoor Championships in June. Rush represented Gibraltar in heptathlon at the 2026 Commonwealth Games in Glasgow, Scotland, placing eleventh overall.
