= Jade O'Dowda =

English athlete

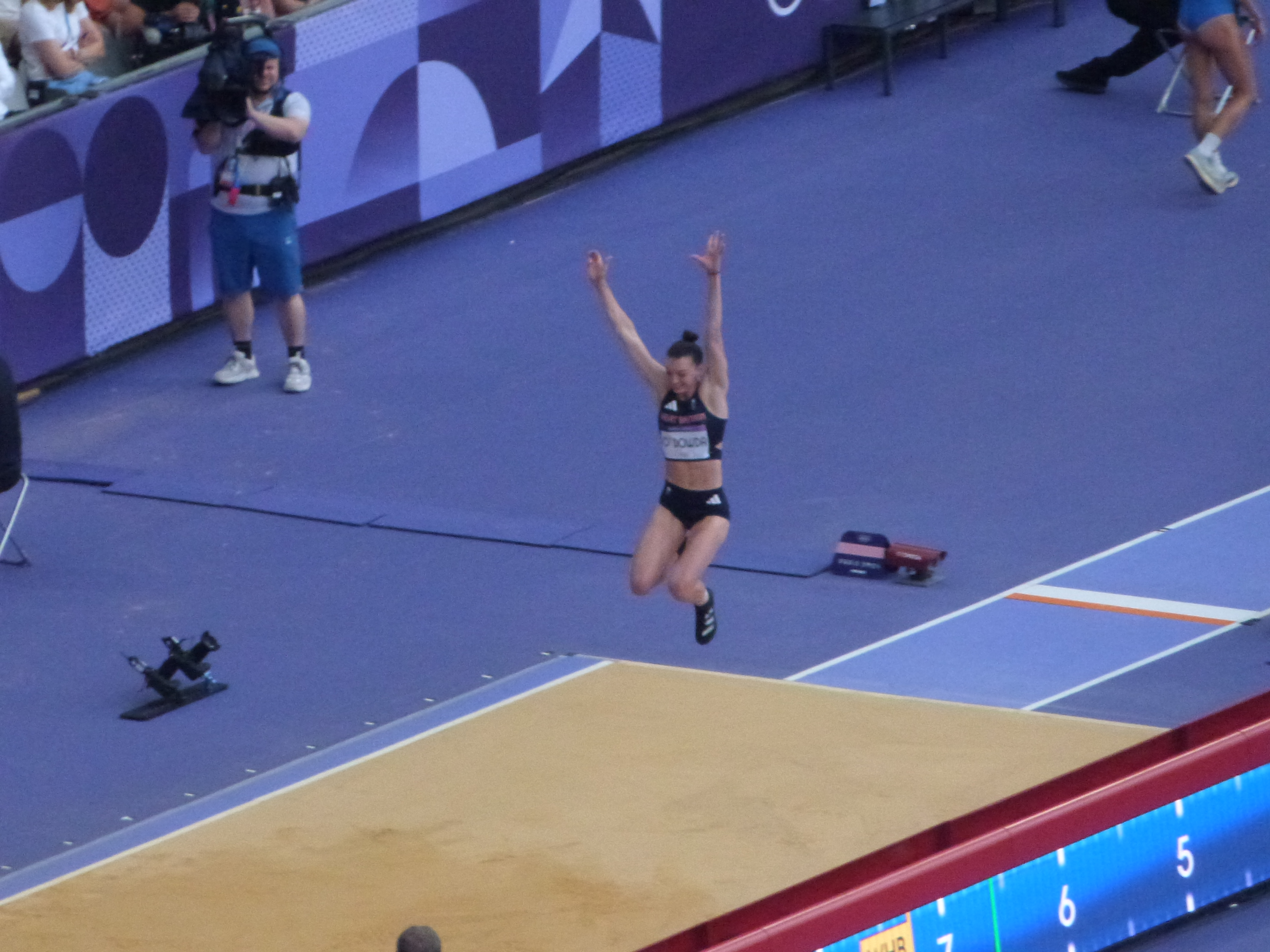
- O'Dowda in 2024

Personal information
- Nationality: English
- Born: 9 September 1999 (age 26) Oxford, England
- Family: Callum O'Dowda (brother)

Sport
- Sport: Athletics
- Event: Heptathlon
- Club: Newham & Essex Beagles
Medal record
Representing England
Commonwealth Games
Silver medal – second place	2026 Glasgow	Heptathlon
Bronze medal – third place	2022 Birmingham	Heptathlon

Jade O'Dowda (born 9 September 1999) is an English international athlete. She won a bronze medal in the heptathlon at the 2022 Commonwealth Games, and upgraded to the silver medal four years later at the 2026 Commonwealth Games.

== Biography ==
O'Dowda was educated at Sheffield Hallam University and is the sister of Irish international footballer Callum O'Dowda. They both are the grandchildren of the late Irish singer Brendan O'Dowda who sang "Pretty Irish Girl" in the Walt Disney film Darby O'Gill and the Little People. In 2018, she entered the world's top 40 heptathletes and finished 7th at the World U20 Championships.

A former Oxford City AC athlete, she won a bronze medal in the women's heptathlon at the 2022 Commonwealth Games in Birmingham, England.

O'Dowda represented Great Britain at the 2022 European Championships, finishing seventh and matched that placing at the 2024 European Athletics Championships.

After winning the long jump gold medal at the 2024 British Athletics Championships, O'Dowda was subsequently named in the Great Britain team for the 2024 Summer Olympics, to compete in the heptathlon. She finished 10th at the Games in Paris.

In February 2025, O'Dowda won the silver medal in the long jump at the British Indoor Championships, behind fellow Oxfordshire athlete Alice Hopkins.
