= 2026 World Athletics Indoor Championships – Men's heptathlon =

Men's heptathlon at the 2026 World Athletics Indoor Championships
- Venue: Kujawsko-Pomorska Arena Toruń
- Location: Toruń, Poland
- Dates: 20-21 March
- Winning score: 6670 WR

Medalists
gold medal	Simon Ehammer	Switzerland
silver medal	Heath Baldwin	United States
bronze medal	Kyle Garland	United States

The men's heptathlon at the 2026 World Athletics Indoor Championships took place on the short track of the Kujawsko-Pomorska Arena Toruń in Toruń, Poland, on 20 and 21 March 2026. This was the 18th time the event will be contested at the World Athletics Indoor Championships. Athletes could qualify by their World Athletics Ranking in the event.

== Background ==
The men's heptathlon was contested 17 times before 2026, at every previous edition of the World Athletics Indoor Championships since 1993

Records before the 2026 World Athletics Indoor Championships
Record	Athlete (nation)	Score (pts)	Location	Date
World record	Ashton Eaton (USA)	6645	Istanbul, Turkey	9-10 March 2012
Championship record	Ashton Eaton (USA)	6645	Istanbul, Turkey	9-10 March 2012
2026 World Lead	Peyton Bair (USA)	6503	Fayetteville, United States	13-14 March 2026

== Qualification ==
For the men's heptathlon, athletes could also qualify by virtue of their World Athletics Ranking for the event. There is a target number of 14 athletes.

== Results ==
=== 60 metres ===
The 60 metres was held on 20 March, starting at 10:05 (UTC+1) in the morning.

Place	Heat	Lane	Athlete	Nation	Time	Points	Notes
1	2	4	Simon Ehammer	Switzerland	6.69	995	PB
2	1	5	Manuel Eitel	Germany	6.91	915	SB
3	2	6	Dario Dester	Italy	6.93	907	
4	1	3	Kyle Garland	United States	6.93	907	SB
5	2	8	Vilém Stráský	Czech Republic	6.94	904	SB
6	2	7	Makenson Gletty	France	6.96	897	SB
7	2	3	Heath Baldwin	United States	6.97	893	PB
8	2	5	Kendrick Thompson	Bahamas	6.98	889	
9	2	2	Jente Hauttekeete	Belgium	6.99	886	
10	1	7	Jeff Tesselaar	Netherlands	7.00	882	SB
11	1	8	José Fernando Ferreira	Brazil	7.03	872	
12	1	2	Ondřej Kopecký	Czech Republic	7.07	858	SB
13	1	6	Téo Bastien	France	7.08	854	
14	1	4	Rasmus Roosleht	Estonia	7.17	823	

=== Long jump ===
The long jump was held on 20 March, starting at 10:53 (UTC+1) in the morning.

Place	Name	Nation	#1	#2	#3	Result	Points	Notes	Total
1	Simon Ehammer	Switzerland	8.08	7.99	8.15	8.15	1099	SB	2094
2	Kyle Garland	United States	7.58	x	7.33	7.58	955		1862
3	Téo Bastien	France	7.44	7.53	7.23	7.53	942	SB	1796
4	Ondřej Kopecký	Czech Republic	7.23	7.42	7.18	7.42	915		1773
5	Vilém Stráský	Czech Republic	7.35	7.29	7.33	7.35	898		1802
6	Heath Baldwin	United States	7.12	7.22	7.34	7.34	896		1789
7	Kendrick Thompson	Bahamas	7.34	7.02	7.15	7.34	896		1785
8	Jeff Tesselaar	Netherlands	7.06	x	7.21	7.21	864		1746
9	Makenson Gletty	France	7.16	7.10	7.17	7.17	854	SB	1751
10	Jente Hauttekeete	Belgium	7.13	7.15	x	7.15	850		1736
11	Rasmus Roosleht	Estonia	7.09	7.10	6.95	7.10	838		1661
12	Dario Dester	Italy	7.05	6.75	—	7.05	826		1733
13	Manuel Eitel	Germany	6.80	6.91	6.98	6.98	809	SB	1724
14	José Fernando Ferreira	Brazil	6.95	6.76	x	6.95	802		1674

=== Shot put ===
The shot put was held on 20 March, starting at 12:57 (UTC+1) in the morning.

Place	Name	Nation	#1	#2	#3	Result	Points	Notes	Total
1	Rasmus Roosleht	Estonia	16.10	16.29	16.44	16.44	878	SB	2539
2	Makenson Gletty	France	16.24	15.99	15.91	16.24	866	SB	2617
3	Kyle Garland	United States	x	16.21	x	16.21	864	SB	2726
4	Heath Baldwin	United States	15.28	15.86	x	15.86	843	SB	2632
5	Jente Hauttekeete	Belgium	15.34	15.23	14.72	15.34	811		2547
6	Manuel Eitel	Germany	15.07	x	15.10	15.10	796	SB	2520
7	Simon Ehammer	Switzerland	14.87	x	14.41	14.87	782	SB	2876
8	Dario Dester	Italy	14.06	14.87	x	14.87	782	PB	2515
9	Ondřej Kopecký	Czech Republic	14.25	14.53	13.97	14.53	761		2534
10	Téo Bastien	France	14.48	14.43	14.48	14.48	758		2554
11	Vilém Stráský	Czech Republic	14.05	14.75	14.24	14.24	743	SB	2545
12	Jeff Tesselaar	Netherlands	14.09	13.62	14.23	14.23	742	PB	2488
13	José Fernando Ferreira	Brazil	13.77	x	13.61	13.77	714	SB	2388
14	Kendrick Thompson	Bahamas	12.93	13.13	x	13.13	675		2460

=== High jump ===
The high jump was held on 20 March, starting at 18:16 (UTC+1) in the evening.

Place	Name	Nation	1.81	1.84	1.87	1.90	1.93	1.96	1.99	2.02	2.05	2.08	2.11	2.14	2.17	Result	Points	Notes	Total
1	Kyle Garland	United States	–	–	–	–	–	o	–	o	o	o	xxo	o	r	2.14	934	SB	3660
2	Heath Baldwin	United States	–	–	–	–	–	–	o	–	o	o	xxx			2.08	878		3510
3	Simon Ehammer	Switzerland	–	–	–	o	–	o	xo	o	xxx					2.02	822	SB	3698
4	Téo Bastien	France	–	–	–	–	o	–	xxo	xxo	xxx					2.02	822		3376
5	Rasmus Roosleht	Estonia	–	–	–	o	o	o	o	xxx						1.99	794		3333
6	Jente Hauttekeete	Belgium	–	–	–	–	o	–	xxo	xxx						1.99	794		3341
7	Makenson Gletty	France	–	–	–	–	–	xo	xxo	xxx						1.99	794		3411
8	Kendrick Thompson	Bahamas	–	–	–	o	o	xxo	xxx							1.96	767	SB	3227
9	Manuel Eitel	Germany	–	o	xo	o	xxo	xxo	xxx							1.96	767	SB	3287
10	Jeff Tesselaar	Netherlands	–	o	o	xxo	xo	xxx								1.93	740	SB	3228
11	Vilém Stráský	Czech Republic	–	xo	o	xxo	xo	xxx								1.93	740	SB	3285
12	Ondřej Kopecký	Czech Republic	–	o	o	o	xxx									1.90	714		3248
13	José Fernando Ferreira	Brazil	o	o	xo	o	xxx									1.90	714		3102
	Dario Dester	Italy	DNS																

=== 60 metres hurdles ===
The 60 metres hurdles was held on 21 March, starting at 10:05 (UTC+1) in the morning.

Place	Heat	Lane	Athlete	Nation	Time	Points	Notes	Total
1	2	6	Simon Ehammer	Switzerland	7.52	1106	WHIB	4804
2	2	4	Heath Baldwin	United States	7.80	1033	PB	4543
3	2	3	Makenson Gletty	France	7.86	1017	SB	4428
4	1	6	Vilém Stráský	Czech Republic	7.88	1012	SB	4297
5	2	7	Kendrick Thompson	Bahamas	7.91	1005	SB	4232
6	2	5	José Fernando Ferreira	Brazil	8.02	977		4079
7	2	8	Jente Hauttekeete	Belgium	8.03	974		4315
9	1	2	Rasmus Roosleht	Estonia	8.12	952	PB	4285
8	1	7	Jeff Tesselaar	Netherlands	8.11	954		4182
10	2	2	Kyle Garland	United States	8.21	930	SB	4590
11	1	4	Téo Bastien	France	8.26	917		4293
12	1	5	Ondřej Kopecký	Czech Republic	8.31	905		4153
13	1	3	Manuel Eitel	Germany	8.58	841	SB	4128

=== Pole vault ===
The pole vault was held on 21 March, starting at 11:10 (UTC+1) in the morning.

Place	Name	Nation	4.40	4.50	4.60	4.70	4.80	4.90	5.00	5.10	5.20	5.30	5.40	Result	Points	Notes	Total
1	Simon Ehammer	Switzerland	–	–	–	–	o	–	o	xxo	xxo	xxo	xxr	5.30	1004	SB	5808
2	Téo Bastien	France	–	–	–	o	–	xo	o	o	xxx			5.10	941	PB	5234
3	Vilém Stráský	Czech Republic	–	o	–	o	o	o	xo	xxo	xxx			5.10	941	PB	5238
4	Heath Baldwin	United States	o	–	o	o	o	o	o	xxx				5.00	910	PB	5453
5	Manuel Eitel	Germany	–	–	–	xo	xxo	o	o	xxx				5.00	910	PB	5038
6	Jente Hauttekeete	Belgium	–	–	–	–	o	o	xxx					4.90	880		5195
7	Rasmus Roosleht	Estonia	–	–	o	o	xxo	o	xxx					4.90	880	PB	5165
8	José Fernando Ferreira	Brazil	o	–	xxo	–	o	–	xxx					4.80	849	SB	4928
9	Jeff Tesselaar	Netherlands	o	o	o	o	xxx							4.70	819	PB	5001
10	Kyle Garland	United States	xo	o	o	o	xxx							4.70	819	SB	5409
11	Ondřej Kopecký	Czech Republic	xxo	–	o	–	xxx							4.60	790		4943
12	Kendrick Thompson	Bahamas	o	–	xxx									4.40	731		4963
	Makenson Gletty	France	–	–	–	–	xxx							NM	DNF		

=== 1000 metres ===
The 1000 metres was held on 21 March, starting at 18:52 (UTC+1) in the evening.

Place	Athlete	Nation	Time	Points	Notes	Total
1	Jeff Tesselaar	Netherlands	2:32.49	959	PB	5960
2	Vilém Stráský	Czech Republic	2:33.25	950	PB	6188
3	Heath Baldwin	United States	2:39.06	884	PB	6337
4	Simon Ehammer	Switzerland	2:41.04	862	PB	6670
5	Jente Hauttekeete	Belgium	2:41.75	854	SB	6049
6	Kyle Garland	United States	2:43.43	836	SB	6245
7	Ondřej Kopecký	Czech Republic	2:44.04	829		5772
9	Kendrick Thompson	Bahamas	2:45.48	813	PB	5776
8	Rasmus Roosleht	Estonia	2:47.95	787		5952
10	Manuel Eitel	Germany	2:48.61	780	SB	5818
11	Téo Bastien	France	2:49.60	770	PB	6004
12	José Fernando Ferreira	Brazil	2:56.47	699	SB	5627
13	Makenson Gletty	France	DNS			DNF

=== Final standings ===
Rank	Name	Nationality	Points	Notes
1st place, gold medalist(s)	Simon Ehammer	Switzerland	6670	WR
2nd place, silver medalist(s)	Heath Baldwin	United States	6337	PB
3rd place, bronze medalist(s)	Kyle Garland	United States	6245	SB
4	Vilém Stráský	Czech Republic	6188	PB
5	Jente Hauttekeete	Belgium	6049	
6	Téo Bastien	France	6004	
7	Jeff Tesselaar	Netherlands	5960	PB
8	Rasmus Roosleht	Estonia	5952	
9	Manuel Eitel	Germany	5818	SB
10	Kendrick Thompson	Bahamas	5776	
11	Ondřej Kopecký	Czech Republic	5772	
12	José Fernando Ferreira	Brazil	5627	
	Makenson Gletty	France	DNF	
	Dario Dester	Italy	DNF	
