= 2025 European Athletics Indoor Championships – Men's heptathlon =

Men's heptathlon at the 2025 European Athletics Indoor Championships
- Venue: Omnisport Apeldoorn
- Location: Apeldoorn, Netherlands
- Dates: 7 and 8 March 2025
- Competitors: 14 from 9 nations
- Winning points: 6558 AR, CR, WL

Medalists
gold medal	Sander Skotheim	Norway
silver medal	Simon Ehammer	Switzerland
bronze medal	Till Steinforth	Germany

The men's heptathlon at the 2025 European Athletics Indoor Championships was held on the short track of Omnisport in Apeldoorn, Netherlands, on 9 March 2025. This was the 17th time the event is contested at the European Athletics Indoor Championships. Athletes can qualify by achieving the entry standard or by their World Athletics Ranking in the event.

The 60 metres, long jump and shot put are scheduled for 7 March during the morning session. The high jump is scheduled for 7 March during the evening session. The 60 metres hurdles and pole vault are scheduled for 8 March during the morning session. The 1000 metres is scheduled for 8 March during the evening session.

== Background ==
The men's heptathlon was contested 16 times before 2025, at every previous edition of the European Athletics Indoor Championships since 1992. The 2025 European Athletics Indoor Championships will be held in Omnisport Apeldoorn in Apeldoorn, Netherlands. The removable indoor athletics track was retopped for these championships in September 2024.

Ashton Eaton is the world record holder in the event, with a score of 6645 points, set in 2012. Sander Skotheim is the European record holder, with a score op 6484 points. Kevin Mayer holds the championship record with a score of 6479 points, set at the 2017 championships.

Records before the 2025 European Athletics Indoor Championships
Record	Athlete (nation)	Score (pts)	Location	Date
World record	Ashton Eaton (USA)	6645	Istanbul, Turkey	10 March 2012
European record	Sander Skotheim (NOR)	6484	Tallinn, Estonia	2 February 2025
Championship record	Kevin Mayer (FRA)	6479	Belgrade, Serbia	5 March 2017
World leading	Sander Skotheim (NOR)	6484	Tallinn, Estonia	2 February 2025
European leading	Sander Skotheim (NOR)	6484	Tallinn, Estonia	2 February 2025

== Qualification ==
For the men's heptathlon, the qualification period runs from 25 February 2024 until 23 February 2025. Athletes can qualify by achieving the entry standards of 6150 points or by achieving the entry standard of 8450 points outdoor in the decathlon. Athletes can also qualify by virtue of their World Athletics Ranking for the event. There is a target number of 14 athletes.

== Results ==
=== 60 metres ===
The 60 metres was held on 7 March, starting at 9:30 (UTC+1) in the morning.

Rank	Heat	Athlete	Nationality	Time	Notes	Points
1	2	Till Steinforth	Germany	6.80		955
2	2	Simon Ehammer	Switzerland	6.81		951
3	2	Vilém Stráský	Czech Republic	6.83	PB	944
4	2	Luc Brewin	France	6.86		933
5	2	Jente Hauttekeete	Belgium	6.93	=PB	907
6	1	Sander Skotheim	Norway	6.93	PB	907
7	2	Rasmus Roosleht	Estonia	6.98		889
8	1	Jeff Tesselaar	Netherlands	.6.98	PB	889
9	2	Johannes Erm	Estonia	7.00	=SB	882
10	2	Risto Lillemets	Estonia	7.02		875
11	1	Téo Bastien	France	7.08		854
12	1	Marcel Meyer	Germany	7.13	=SB	837
13	1	Tim Nowak	Germany	7.28		785
14	1	Edgaras Benkunskas	Lithuania	7.28		785

=== Long jump ===
The long jump was held on 7 March, starting at 10:05 (UTC+1) in the morning.

Rank	Athlete	Nationality	#1	#2	#3	Result	Notes	Points	Total
1	Simon Ehammer	Switzerland	x	8.20	6.47	8.20	CHB, SB	1112	2063
2	Sander Skotheim	Norway	7.87	7.88	7.95	7.95		1048	1955
3	Till Steinforth	Germany	7.44	7.22	7.89	7.89	SB	1033	1988
4	Jeff Tesselaar	Netherlands	7.56	5.06	7.55	7.56	SB	950	1839
5	Johannes Erm	Estonia	7.48	7.48	7.31	7.48		930	1812
6	Luc Brewin	France	7.47	7.37	7.17	7.47		927	1860
7	Téo Bastien	France	7.38	7.29	3.93	7.38		905	1759
8	Jente Hauttekeete	Belgium	7.07	7.22	7.30	7.30		886	1793
9	Rasmus Roosleht	Estonia	7.03	x	7.27	7.27		878	1767
10	Vilém Stráský	Czech Republic	7.26	7.04	7.16	7.26	SB	876	1820
11	Marcel Meyer	Germany	x	x	7.04	7.04		823	1660
12	Tim Nowak	Germany	6.94	6.82	6.98	6.98		809	1594
13	Edgaras Benkunskas	Lithuania	6.69	6.75	6.87	6.87		783	1568
14	Risto Lillemets	Estonia	6.64	x	6.80	6.80		767	1642

=== Shot put ===
The shot put was held on 7 March, starting at 12:58 (UTC+1) in the afternoon.

Rank	Athlete	Nationality	#1	#2	#3	Result	Notes	Points	Total
1	Rasmus Roosleht	Estonia	16.17	16.33	16.20	16.33		872	2639
2	Marcel Meyer	Germany	15.61	14.85	14.99	15.61	PB	827	2487
3	Johannes Erm	Estonia	14.83	14.37	15.52	15.52	SB	822	2634
4	Simon Ehammer	Switzerland	15.15	x	x	15.15	SB	799	2862
5	Edgaras Benkunskas	Lithuania	x	15.08	x	15.08		795	2363
6	Jente Hauttekeete	Belgium	14.89	14.98	14.71	14.98	SB	788	2581
7	Till Steinforth	Germany	14.68	14.72	14.95	14.95	PB	787	2775
8	Tim Nowak	Germany	14.85	14.89	x	14.89	SB	783	2377
9	Risto Lillemets	Estonia	14.82	x	14.41	14.82	SB	779	2421
10	Téo Bastien	France	14.61	x	x	14.61		766	2525
11	Vilém Stráský	Czech Republic	14.05	14.13	14.44	14.44		755	2575
12	Sander Skotheim	Norway	13.94	14.18	14.39	14.39		752	2707
13	Jeff Tesselaar	Netherlands	13.95	13.60	13.69	13.95		725	2564
14	Luc Brewin	France	10.76	13.06	13.14	13.14		676	2536

=== High jump ===
The high jump was held on 7 March, starting at 19:00 (UTC+1) in the evening.

Rank	Athlete	Nationality	1.77	1.80	1.83	1.86	1.89	1.92	1.95	1.98	2.01	2.04	2.07	2.10	2.13	2.16	2.19	2.22	Result	Points	Note	Total
1	Sander Skotheim	Norway	−	−	−	−	−	−	−	−	−	o	o	o	xo	o	o	xxx	2.19	982	=CHB, SB	3689
2	Jente Hauttekeete	Belgium	−	−	−	−	−	o	o	xo	o	xxo	xxo	xxx					2.07	868	=SB	3449
3	Johannes Erm	Estonia	−	−	−	o	o	o	xo	o	o	xxx							2.01	813	SB	3447
4	Tim Nowak	Germany	−	−	−	−	−	−	o	o	xo	xxx							2.01	813	SB	3190
5	Till Steinforth	Germany	−	−	−	o	o	o	xxo	o	xxx								1.98	785	=SB	3560
6	Rasmus Roosleht	Estonia	−	−	−	−	o	−	o	xxo	xxx								1.98	785		3424
7	Simon Ehammer	Switzerland	−	−	−	−	o	o	xo	xxo	xxx								1.98	785	=SB	3647
8	Vilém Stráský	Czech Republic	−	−	−	o	−	o	o	xxx									1.95	758		3333
9	Luc Brewin	France	−	−	o	−	o	xo	xxo	xxx									1.95	758	=PB	3294
10	Risto Lillemets	Estonia	−	−	−	−	o	o	xxx										1.92	731		3152
11	Edgaras Benkunskas	Lithuania	−	−	o	−	o	xxo	xxx										1.92	731		3094
12	Marcel Meyer	Germany	−	−	o	xo	o	xxx											1.89	705		3192
13	Jeff Tesselaar	Netherlands	o	o	xo	xo	xxo	xxx											1.89	705	SB	3269
14	Téo Bastien	France	−	−	−	o	−	xxx											1.86	679		3204

=== 60 metres hurdles ===
The 60 metres hurdles was held on 8 March, starting at 10:00 (UTC+1) in the morning.

Rank	Heat	Athlete	Nationality	Time	Notes	Points	Total
1	2	Simon Ehammer	Switzerland	7.68		1064	4711
2	2	Vilém Stráský	Czech Republic	7.90		1007	4340
3	2	Till Steinforth	Germany	7.90		1007	4567
4	2	Jente Hauttekeete	Belgium	7.95	PB	994	4443
5	2	Johannes Erm	Estonia	8.02		977	4424
6	1	Marcel Meyer	Germany	8.03		974	4166
7	2	Sander Skotheim	Norway	8.04		972	4661
8	2	Risto Lillemets	Estonia	8.08	=SB	962	4114
9	1	Jeff Tesselaar	Netherlands	8.11	PB	954	4223
10	1	Rasmus Roosleht	Estonia	8.12	PB	952	4376
11	1	Tim Nowak	Germany	8.24		922	4112
12	1	Edgaras Benkunskas	Lithuania	8.49		862	3956
	1	Téo Bastien	France	DNF		0	3204
	2	Luc Brewin	France	DNS		0	3294

=== Pole vault ===
The pole vault was held on 8 March, starting at 11:00 (UTC+1) in the morning.

Rank	Athlete	Nationality	4.30	4.40	4.50	4.60	4.70	4.80	4.90	5.00	5.10	5.20	5.30	5.40	Result	Points	Note	Total
1	Johannes Erm	Estonia	–	–	–	–	–	–	o	o	o	xo	o	xxx	5.30	1004	SB	5428
2	Simon Ehammer	Switzerland	–	–	–	–	–	–	o	o	o	xxx			5.10	941	SB	5652
3	Sander Skotheim	Norway	–	–	–	–	–	–	xo	xo	o	xxx			5.10	941		5602
4	Jente Hauttekeete	Belgium	–	–	–	–	–	–	xo	xxo	o	xxx			5.10	941	PB	5384
5	Risto Lillemets	Estonia	–	–	–	–	–	–	o	o	xxx				5.00	910	SB	5024
6	Till Steinforth	Germany	–	–	–	–	–	–	o	xxo	xxx				5.00	910		5477
7	Rasmus Roosleht	Estonia	–	–	–	–	–	–	xo	xxx					4.90	880	=PB	5256
7	Vilém Stráský	Czech Republic	–	–	–	–	–	–	xo	xxx					4.90	880	SB	5220
9	Tim Nowak	Germany	–	–	–	–	–	–	xo	xxx					4.90	880		4992
10	Marcel Meyer	Germany	–	–	–	o	xo	xxx							4.70	819		4985
11	Jeff Tesselaar	Netherlands	o	o	xxo	o	xx								4.60	790		5013
12	Edgaras Benkunskas	Lithuania	–	o	o	xxx									4.50	760		4716

=== 1000 metres ===
The 1000 m was held on 8 March, starting at 20:45 (UTC+1) in the evening.

Rank	Athlete	Nationality	Time	Notes	Points	Total
1	Sander Skotheim	Norway	2:32.72	CHB, PB	956	6558
2	Johannes Erm	Estonia	2:33.09	PB	952	6380
3	Vilém Stráský	Czech Republic	2:33.95	PB	942	6162
4	Jeff Tesselaar	Netherlands	2:34.55		935	5948
5	Tim Nowak	Germany	2:35.77	PB	921	5913
6	Till Steinforth	Germany	2:36.69	PB	911	6388
7	Risto Lillemets	Estonia	2:37.83	PB	898	5922
8	Marcel Meyer	Germany	2:37.92	PB	897	5882
9	Jente Hauttekeete	Belgium	2:39.82	PB	875	6259
10	Simon Ehammer	Switzerland	2:41.76	PB	854	6506
11	Rasmus Roosleht	Estonia	2:46.14		806	6062
12	Edgaras Benkunskas	Lithuania	2:54.17	SB	723	5439

=== Final results ===
The highest mark recorded in each event is highlighted in yellow

Rank	Athlete	Nationality	60m	LJ	SP	HJ	60mH	PV	1000m	Points	Notes
1st place, gold medalist(s)	Sander Skotheim	Norway	6.93	7.95	14.39	2.19	8.04	5.10	2:32.72	6558	AR, CR, WL
2nd place, silver medalist(s)	Simon Ehammer	Switzerland	6.81	8.20	15.15	1.98	7.68	5.10	2:41.76	6506	NR
3rd place, bronze medalist(s)	Till Steinforth	Germany	6.80	7.89	14.95	1.98	7.90	5.00	2:36.69	6388	NR
4	Johannes Erm	Estonia	7.00	7.48	15.52	2.01	8.02	5.30	2:33.09	6380	NR
5	Jente Hauttekeete	Belgium	6.93	7.30	14.98	2.07	7.95	5.10	2:39.82	6259	=NR
6	Vilém Stráský	Czech Republic	6.83	7.26	14.44	1.95	7.90	4.90	2:33.95	6162	PB
7	Rasmus Roosleht	Estonia	6.98	7.27	16.33	1.98	8.12	4.90	2:46.14	6062	PB
8	Jeff Tesselaar	Netherlands	6.98	7.56	13.95	1.89	8.11	4.60	2:34.55	5948	PB
9	Risto Lillemets	Estonia	7.02	7.27	14.82	1.92	8.08	5.00	2:37.83	5922	SB
10	Tim Nowak	Germany	7.28	6.98	14.89	2.01	8.24	4.90	2:35.77	5913	SB
11	Marcel Meyer	Germany	7.13	7.04	15.61	1.89	8.03	4.70	2:37.92	5882	SB
12	Edgaras Benkunskas	Lithuania	7.28	6.87	15.08	1.92	8.49	4.50	2:54.17	5439	SB
	Luc Brewin	France	6.86	7.47	13.14	1.95	DNS			DNF	
	Téo Bastien	France	7.08	7.38	14.61	1.86	DNF	DNS		DNF	
