= 2024 World Athletics Indoor Championships – Men's heptathlon =

International sporting competition

Men's heptathlon at the 2024 World Athletics Indoor Championships
- Venue: Commonwealth Arena
- Dates: 2–3 March
- Competitors: 11 from 9 nations
- Winning points: 6418

Medalists
gold medal	Simon Ehammer	Switzerland
silver medal	Sander Skotheim	Norway
bronze medal	Johannes Erm	Estonia

The men's heptathlon at the 2024 World Athletics Indoor Championships took place on 2-3 March 2024.

The gold medallist won by 11 points and achieved the best score in four of the seven events.

== Detailed Results ==
=== 60 metres ===
The 60 metres were started at 11:00.

Rank	Heat	Name	Nationality	Time	Points	Notes
1	2	Simon Ehammer	Switzerland	6.73	980	SB
2	2	Sven Jansons	Netherlands	6.81	951	
3	2	Ken Mullings	Bahamas	6.83	944	=PB
4	2	Makenson Gletty	France	6.90	918	SB
5	2	Johannes Erm	Estonia	6.90	918	PB
6	1	Harrison Williams	United States	6.95	900	SB
7	2	Vilém Stráský	Czech Republic	6.95	900	
8	1	Jente Hauttekeete	Belgium	7.06	861	
9	1	Sander Skotheim	Norway	7.06	861	
10	1	Markus Rooth	Norway	7.08	854	PB
11	1	Ondřej Kopecký	Czech Republic	7.10	847	

=== Long jump ===
The long jump was started at 12:15.

Rank	Name	Nationality	#1	#2	#3	Result	Points	Notes	Total
1	Simon Ehammer	Switzerland	8.03	x	8.00	8.03	1068		2048
2	Sven Jansons	Netherlands	7.79	7.41	-	7.79	1007	PB	1958
3	Sander Skotheim	Norway	7.74	7.73	7.75	7.75	997		1858
4	Johannes Erm	Estonia	7.71	7.63	7.42	7.71	987	SB	1905
5	Ken Mullings	Bahamas	7.65	7.57	7.69	7.69	982	PB	1926
6	Markus Rooth	Norway	7.61	7.65	7.68	7.68	980	PB	1834
7	Vilém Stráský	Czech Republic	6.77	7.25	7.04	7.25	874	=SB	1774
8	Ondřej Kopecký	Czech Republic	7.00	7.24	7.23	7.24	871		1718
9	Jente Hauttekeete	Belgium	6.75	x	7.22	7.22	866		1727
10	Makenson Gletty	France	7.01	7.14	7.12	7.14	847		1765
	Harrison Williams	United States				DNS	0		DNF

=== Shot put ===
The shot put was started at 13:35.

Rank	Name	Nationality	#1	#2	#3	Result	Points	Notes	Total
1	Makenson Gletty	France	15.89	16.26	16.95	16.95	910	PB	2675
2	Johannes Erm	Estonia	15.45	15.70	15.72	15.72	834	PB	2739
3	Markus Rooth	Norway	14.48	15.52	15.12	15.52	822	PB	2656
4	Vilém Stráský	Czech Republic	14.54	14.67	14.45	14.67	769	PB	2543
5	Sander Skotheim	Norway	14.10	14.58	14.35	14.58	764	PB	2622
6	Ken Mullings	Bahamas	13.62	14.49	14.33	14.49	758		2684
7	Jente Hauttekeete	Belgium	14.48	x	x	14.48	758	SB	2485
8	Simon Ehammer	Switzerland	12.58	13.67	14.39	14.39	752	SB	2800
9	Ondřej Kopecký	Czech Republic	13.15	x	13.79	13.79	715		2433
10	Sven Jansons	Netherlands	13.22	13.49	13.54	13.54	700		2658

=== High jump ===
The high jump was started at 11:00.

Rank	Name	Nationality	1.83	1.86	1.89	1.92	1.95	1.98	2.01	2.04	2.07	2.10	2.13	2.16	2.19	Result	Points	Notes	Total
1	Ken Mullings	Bahamas	–	–	–	–	–	–	xo	o	xxo	xo	xo	xxo	xxr	2.16	953	PB	3637
2	Sander Skotheim	Norway	–	–	–	–	–	–	o	–	o	o	xo	xxx		2.13	925	SB	3547
3	Jente Hauttekeete	Belgium	–	–	–	–	xo	–	xxo	xxx						2.01	813		3298
4	Johannes Erm	Estonia	xo	–	xo	o	o	xxo	xxo	xxx						2.01	813	SB	3552
5	Markus Rooth	Norway	–	–	–	xo	o	xo	xxx							1.98	785	SB	3441
6	Vilém Stráský	Czech Republic	–	o	o	o	o	xxo	xxx							1.98	785	SB	3328
7	Simon Ehammer	Switzerland	–	–	xo	xo	o	xxx								1.95	758		3558
7	Sven Jansons	Netherlands	o	o	xxo	o	o	xxx								1.95	758		3416
9	Makenson Gletty	France	–	–	–	o	xxx									1.92	731		3406
10	Ondřej Kopecký	Czech Republic	–	xxo												1.86	679		3112

=== 60 metres hurdles ===
The 60 metres hurdles were started at 10:05.

Rank	Heat	Name	Nationality	Time	Points	Notes	Total
1	2	Simon Ehammer	Switzerland	7.62	1080		4638
2	2	Ken Mullings	Bahamas	7.76	1043	PB	4680
3	2	Makenson Gletty	France	7.82	1028		4434
4	1	Vilém Stráský	Czech Republic	7.95	994	SB	4322
5	1	Markus Rooth	Norway	8.01	979	PB	4420
6	2	Sander Skotheim	Norway	8.05	969		4516
7	1	Jente Hauttekeete	Belgium	8.09	959		4257
8	2	Sven Jansons	Netherlands	8.12	952		4368
9	1	Ondřej Kopecký	Czech Republic	8.14	947		4059
10	1	Johannes Erm	Estonia	8.21	930	SB	4482

=== Pole vault ===
The pole vault was started at 12:15.

Rank	Name	Nationality	4.30	4.40	4.50	4.60	4.70	4.80	4.90	5.00	5.10	5.20	5.30	Result	Points	Notes	Total
1	Simon Ehammer	Switzerland	–	–	–	–	o	–	o	o	o	o	xxx	5.20	972		5610
2	Markus Rooth	Norway	–	–	–	–	–	o	o	xo	o	xxx		5.10	941	PB	5361
2	Sander Skotheim	Norway	–	–	–	–	–	o	–	xo	o	xxx		5.10	941		5457
4	Johannes Erm	Estonia	–	–	–	o	–	o	xo	xo	xxo	xxx		5.10	941	PB	5423
5	Jente Hauttekeete	Belgium	–	–	–	–	o	xo	o	xo	xxx			5.00	910	SB	5167
6	Makenson Gletty	France	–	–	–	–	xxo	–	xo	xxo	xxx			5.00	910		5344
7	Vilém Stráský	Czech Republic	–	o	–	o	o	xo	xo	xxx				4.90	880		5202
7	Ondřej Kopecký	Czech Republic	–	–	–	xo	–	–	xo	r				4.90	880	SB	4939
9	Sven Jansons	Netherlands	o	–	o	o	o	xo	xxx					4.80	849	PB	5217
10	Ken Mullings	Bahamas	–	xo	o	o	xxx							4.60	790		5470

=== 1000 metres ===
The 1000 metres was started at 20:47.

Rank	Name	Nationality	Time	Points	Notes	Total
1	Sander Skotheim	Norway	2:33.23	950	PB	6407
2	Johannes Erm	Estonia	2:36.15	917	SB	6340
3	Vilém Stráský	Czech Republic	2:39.56	878	PB	6080
4	Sven Jansons	Netherlands	2:41.26	859	SB	6076
5	Makenson Gletty	France	2:42.76	843		6187
6	Simon Ehammer	Switzerland	2:46.03	808	PB	6418
7	Ondřej Kopecký	Czech Republic	2:46.90	798		5737
8	Jente Hauttekeete	Belgium	2:49.29	773		5940
9	Ken Mullings	Bahamas	2:49.35	772	PB	6242
	Markus Rooth	Norway	DNS			

== Overall results ==
After all events.

Key

The highest mark recorded in each event is highlighted in yellow

Key:	WL	World leading performance	NR	National record	PB	Personal best	DNS	Did not start	DNF	Did not finish

Rank	Name	Nationality	Overall points	Notes	60 m	LJ	SP	HJ	60 m H	PV	1000 m
1st place, gold medalist(s)	Simon Ehammer	Switzerland	6418	WL, NR	980; 6.73s	1068; 8.03m	752; 14.39m	758; 1.95m	1080; 7.62s	972; 5.20m	808; 2:46.03
2nd place, silver medalist(s)	Sander Skotheim	Norway	6407	NR	861; 7.06s	997; 7.75m	764; 14.58m	925; 2.13m	969; 8.05s	941; 5.10m	950; 2:33.23
3rd place, bronze medalist(s)	Johannes Erm	Estonia	6340	PB	918; 6.90s	987; 7.71m	834; 15.72m	813; 2.01m	930; 8.21s	941; 5.10m	917; 2:36.15
4	Ken Mullings	Bahamas	6242		944; 6.83s	982; 7.69m	758; 14.49m	953; 2.16m	1043; 7.76s	790; 4.60m	772; 2:49.35
5	Makenson Gletty	France	6187		918; 6.90s	847; 7.14m	910; 16.95m	731; 1.92m	1028; 7.82s	910; 5.00m	843; 2:42.76
6	Vilém Stráský	Czech Republic	6080	PB	900; 6.95s	874; 7.25m	769; 14.67m	785; 1.98m	994; 7.95s	880; 4.90m	878; 2:39.56
7	Sven Jansons	Netherlands	6076	PB	951; 6.81s	1007; 7.79m	700; 13.54m	758; 1.95m	952; 8.12s	849; 4.80m	859; 2:41.26
8	Jente Hauttekeete	Belgium	5940		861; 7.06s	866; 7.22m	758; 14.48m	813; 2.01m	959; 8.09s	910; 5.00m	773; 2:49.29
9	Ondřej Kopecký	Czech Republic	5737		847; 7.10s	871; 7.24m	715; 13.79m	679; 1.86m	947; 8.14s	880; 4.90m	798; 2:46.90
	Markus Rooth	Norway	DNF		854; 7.08s	980; 7.68m	822; 15.52m	785; 1.98m	979; 8.01s	941; 5.10m	DNS
	Harrison Williams	United States	DNF		900; 6.95s	DNS	DNS	DNS	DNS	DNS	DNS
