= 2023 European Athletics U23 Championships – Men's decathlon =

Men's decathlon at the 2023 European Athletics U23 Championships
- Venue: Leppävaara Stadium
- Location: Espoo, Finland
- Dates: 15–16 July
- Competitors: 22 from 12 nations
- Winning points: 8608 CR

Medalists
gold medal	Markus Rooth	Norway
silver medal	Sander Skotheim	Norway
bronze medal	Sven Roosen	Netherlands

The men's decathlon event at the 2021 European Athletics U23 Championships was held in Tallinn, Estonia, at Kadriorg Stadium on 15 and 16 July.

== Records ==
Prior to the competition, the records were as follows:

European U23 record	Niklas Kaul (GER)	8691	Doha, Qatar	4 October 2019
Championship U23 record	Niklas Kaul (GER)	8572	Gävle, Sweden	14 July 2019

== Results ==
=== Final standings ===
The highest mark recorded in each event is highlighted in yellow

Rank	Athlete	Nationality	100m	LJ	SP	HJ	400m	110m H	DT	PV	JT	1500m	Points	Notes
1st place, gold medalist(s)	Markus Rooth	Norway	10.81	7.61	15.31	2.03	49.05	14.43	48.63	5.10	63.71	4:29.66	8608	CR
2nd place, silver medalist(s)	Sander Skotheim	Norway	10.86	7.70	13.74	2.15	47.69	14.68	43.31	5.10	57.93	4:16.60	8561	
3rd place, bronze medalist(s)	Sven Roosen	Netherlands	10.77	7.16	14.58	1.82	47.43	14.53	42.13	4.80	60.38	4:20.12	8128	
4	Marcel Meyer	Austria	11.02	7.12	15.02	1.97	47.94	14.56	41.86	4.70	57.71	4:22.84	8096	PB
5	Rasmus Roosleht	Estonia	10.86	6.78	15.61	1.97	49.67	14.90	46.91	4.70	62.36	4:42.84	8010	PB
6	Jente Hauttekeete	Belgium	10.90	7.22	14.23	2.12	49.18	14.61	36.75	4.50	52.38	4:32.98	7864	
7	Andreu Boix	Spain	10.83	7.26	12.53	1.97	48.33	15.04	39.72	4.90	51.69	4:27.23	7844	
8	Luc Brewin	France	10.92	7.39	12.43	1.88	49.86	14.54	40.03	5.10	53.34	4:35.65	7794	PB
9	Jeff Tesselaar	Netherlands	10.81	7.22	13.09	1.94	48.42	15.01	41.54	4.50	47.75	4:19.58	7753	PB
10	Thomas van der Poel	Belgium	10.98	7.19	11.61	2.06	49.48	15.48	37.64	4.70	51.34	4:34.26	7558	
11	Elliot Duvert	Sweden	11.26	7.10	13.63	2.00	51.24	15.33	39.25	4.80	49.58	4:33.38	7522	
12	Aleksi Savolainen	Finland	11.10	6.96	14.16	1.88	50.82	15.47	35.71	5.00	50.30	4:42.67	7392	PB
13	Zsombor Gálpál	Hungary	10.90	6.36	13.78	1.82	49.42	15.21	37.49	4.40	59.75	4:36.77	7354	
14	Dominique Hall	Austria	11.27	6.60	11.34	1.82	49.99	15.53	38.23	4.40	39.86	4:52.26	6738	
15	Pierre Blaecke	France	11.21	6.43	12.42	1.82	51.31	17.10	32.80	NM	DNS		DNF	
	Jack Turner	Great Britain	10.86	7.36	12.70	2.00	48.32	15.47	38.71	4.50	DNS		DNF	
	Téo Bastien	France	10.95	7.37	13.40	1.94	50.93	15.06	39.23	DNS			DNF	
	František Doubek	Czech Republic	11.13	6.57	13.33	1.91	50.59	DQ	39.52	DNS			DNF	
	Pol Ferrer	Spain	10.81	7.05	11.52	1.91	DNF	DNS					DNF	
	Carl Af Forselles	Sweden	10.80	7.28	11.42	1.91	DNS						DNF	
	José San Pastor	Spain	11.11	7.16	14.71	NM	DNS						DNF	
	Ollie Thorner	Great Britain	10.94	6.99	13.46	1.94	DNS						DNF	
