= Johannes Erm =

Estonian decathlete (born 1998)

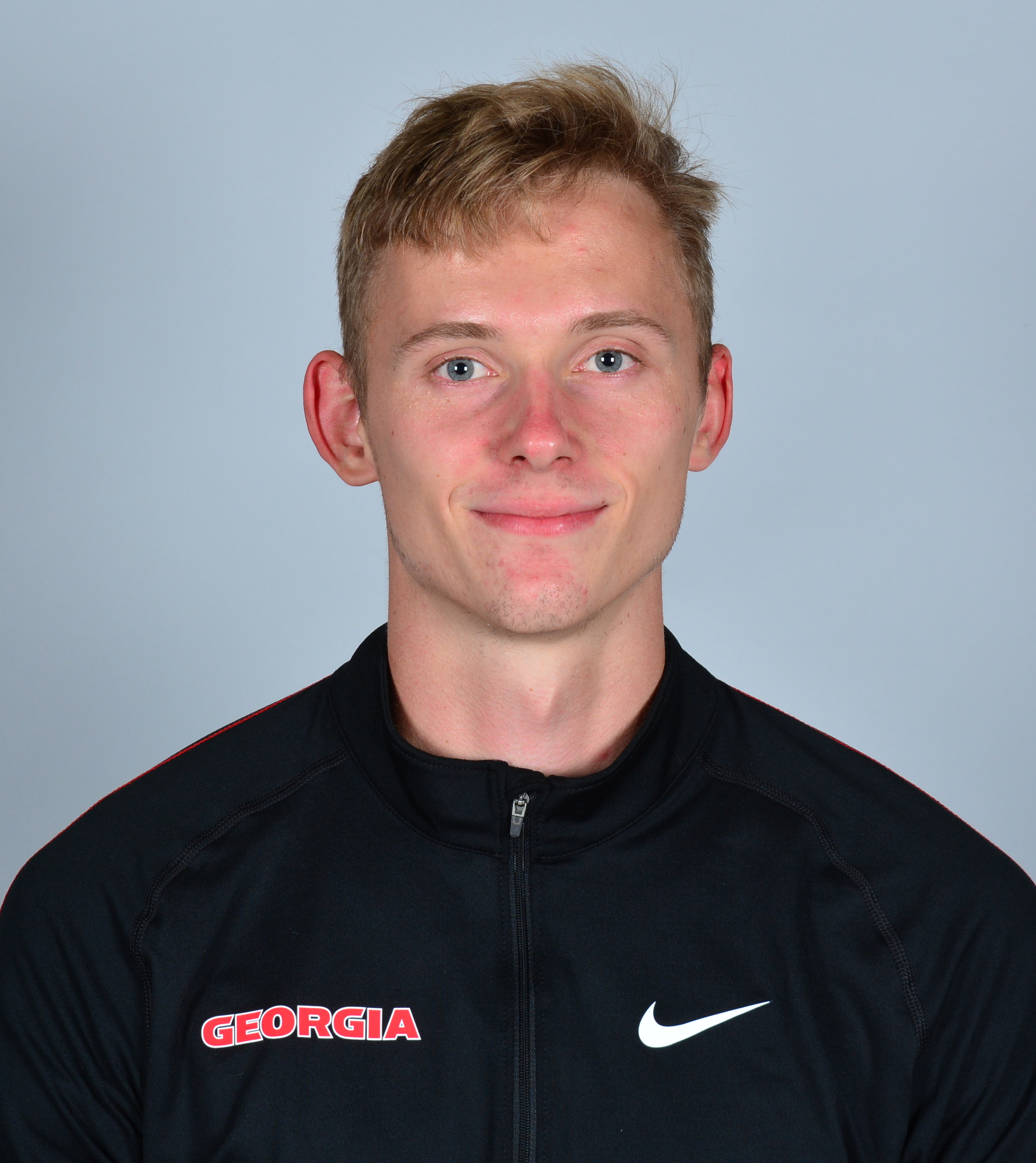

Personal information
- Born: March 26, 1998 (age 28) Tartu, Estonia
- Education: University of Georgia
- Height: 197 cm (6 ft 6 in)
- Weight: 88 kg (194 lb)

Sport
- Country: Estonia
- Sport: Athletics
- Events: Decathlon, Heptathlon
- University team: Georgia Bulldogs
- Coached by: Petros Kyprianou (2017–2021) James Thomas (2021–2023) Holger Peel (2023–)

Achievements and titles
- Personal bests: Decathlon: 8,764 points (2024); Heptathlon: 6,437 points (2025)
Medal record
Men's decathlon
Representing Estonia
Event	1st	2nd	3rd
World Indoor Championships	0	1	1
European Championships	1	0	0
U20 European Championships	0	1	0
U20 World Championships	0	0	1
U23 European Championships	0	1	0
Total	1	3	2
World Indoor Championships
Silver medal – second place	2025 Nanjing	Heptathlon
Bronze medal – third place	2024 Glasgow	Heptathlon
European Championships
Gold medal – first place	2024 Rome	Decathlon
World U20 Championships
Bronze medal – third place	2016 Bydgoszcz	Decathlon
European U20 Championships
Silver medal – second place	2017 Grosseto	Decathlon
European U23 Championships
Silver medal – second place	2019 Gävle	Decathlon
- Updated on 18 April 2025

Johannes Erm (born March 26, 1998) is an Estonian decathlete and the reigning European champion and a silver medalist at the 2025 World Athletics Indoor Championships in the heptathlon. He competed at the 2020 and 2024 Olympic Games. He won the 2019 NCAA championships in the decathlon.

== Career ==
Johannes Erm was born March 26, 1998, in Tartu. He started school in Tallinn Secondary School of Science. In his youth he played football in the Estonian club FC Flora. In 2011, he transitioned into track and field and started training with his trainer at the time Holger Peel. In 2017 he finished high school and went to study mechanical engineering in University of Georgia. Where he was coached by Petros Kyprianou. In 2021 his coach changed to James Thomas. In 2023, after finishing his studies and returning to Estonia, his coach changed back to Holger Peel.

He finished eleventh in the decathlon at the delayed 2020 Olympics in Tokyo, Japan, with a tally of 8,213 points.

He finished ninth at the 2022 World Athletics Championships in Eugene, Oregon, finishing with a tally of 8,227 points in the decathlon. He also placed ninth in the decathlon at the 2023 World Athletics Championships in Budapest, Hungary, with a personal best score of 8,484 points.

He was selected to compete in the heptathlon at the 2024 World Athletics Championships in Glasgow, Scotland, in March 2024, and finished in third place overall to win the bronze medal with a personal best 6,340 points.

Competing in the decathlon he was a gold medalist at the 2024 European Athletics Championships in Rome in June 2024, with a personal best tally of 8,764 points. Whilst competing at the 2024 Summer Olympics in Paris, he finished in sixth place overall.

In March 2025, he competed in the heptathlon at the 2025 European Athletics Indoor Championships in Apeldoorn, Netherlands, finishing in fourth place with 6,380 points, coming close to a medal, finishing just eight points behind bronze medalist Till Steinforth of Germany. He followed that by also competing in the heptathlon at the 2025 World Athletics Indoor Championships in Nanjing, China, later in the same month, and this time came away with a medal as he set an Estonian national record of 6,437 points to win the silver medal behind Sander Skotheim of Norway, whilst Germany’s Till Steinforth claimed bronze with 6275. He finished second at Décastar in July 2025.

== International competitions ==
Year	Competition	Venue	Position	Event	Result
Representing Estonia
2016	World U20 Championships	Bydgoszcz	3rd	Decathlon U20	7,879 points
2017	European U20 Championships	Grosseto	2nd	Decathlon U20	8,141 points
2019	European U23 Championships	Gävle	2nd	Decathlon	8,445 points
2021	Olympic Games	Tokyo	11th	Decathlon	8,213 points
2022	World Championships	Eugene	9th	Decathlon	8,227 points
2023	World Championships	Budapest	9th	Decathlon	8,484 points
2024	World Indoor Championships	Glasgow	3rd	Heptathlon	6,340 points
2024	European Championships	Rome	1st	Decathlon	8,764 points
2024	Olympic Games	Paris	6th	Decathlon	8,569 points
2025	European Indoor Championships	Apeldoorn	4th	Heptathlon	6,380 points
2025	World Indoor Championships	Nanjing	2nd	Heptathlon	6,437 points
2025	World Championships	Tokyo	5th	Decathlon	8,431 points
2026	European Championships	Birmingham	–	Decathlon	DNF

== Personal bests ==
Information from World Athletics profile unless otherwise noted.

Outdoor

As of 21 June 2025

Event	Performance	Location	Date	Points
Decathlon	—N/a	Rome	10–11 June 2024	8,764 points
100 metres	10.60 (+0.4 m/s)	Rome	10 June 2024	952 points
Long jump	7.98 m (26 ft 2 in) (+0.6 m/s)	Eugene	6 June 2018	1,056 points
Shot put	15.38 m (50 ft 5 1/2 in)	Budapest	26 August 2023	813 points
High jump	2.08 m (6 ft 9 3/4 in)	Paris	2 August 2024	878 points
400 metres	46.81	Rome	10 June 2024	968 points
110 metres hurdles	14.19 (+1.3 m/s)	Athens, Georgia	5 April 2019	950 points
Discus throw	49.39 m (162 ft 1/4 in)	Tallinn	9 August 2020	858 points
Pole vault	5.37 m (17 ft 7 1/4 in)	Talence	15 September 2024	1,026 points
Javelin throw	62.71 m (205 ft 8 3/4 in)	Rome	26 August 2023	779 points
1500 metres	4:22.19	Budapest	11 June 2024	797 points
Virtual Best Performance				9,077 points

Indoor

As of 21 June 2025

Event	Performance	Location	Date	Points
Heptathlon	—N/a	Nanjing	22–23 March 2025	6,437 points
60 metres	6.90	Glasgow	2 March 2024	918 points
Long jump	7.77 m (25 ft 5 3/4 in)	Nanjing	22 March 2025	1,002 points
Shot put	15.72 m (51 ft 6 3/4 in)	Glasgow	2 March 2024	834 points
High jump	2.01 m (6 ft 7 in)	Apeldoorn	7 March 2025	813 points
60 metres hurdles	7.91	Nanjing	23 March 2025	1,005 points
Pole vault	5.30 m (17 ft 4 1/2 in)	Apeldoorn	8 March 2025	1,004 points
1000 metres	2:33.09	Apeldoorn	8 March 2025	952 points
Virtual Best Performance				6,528 points
