= Simon Ehammer =

Swiss athlete (born 2000)

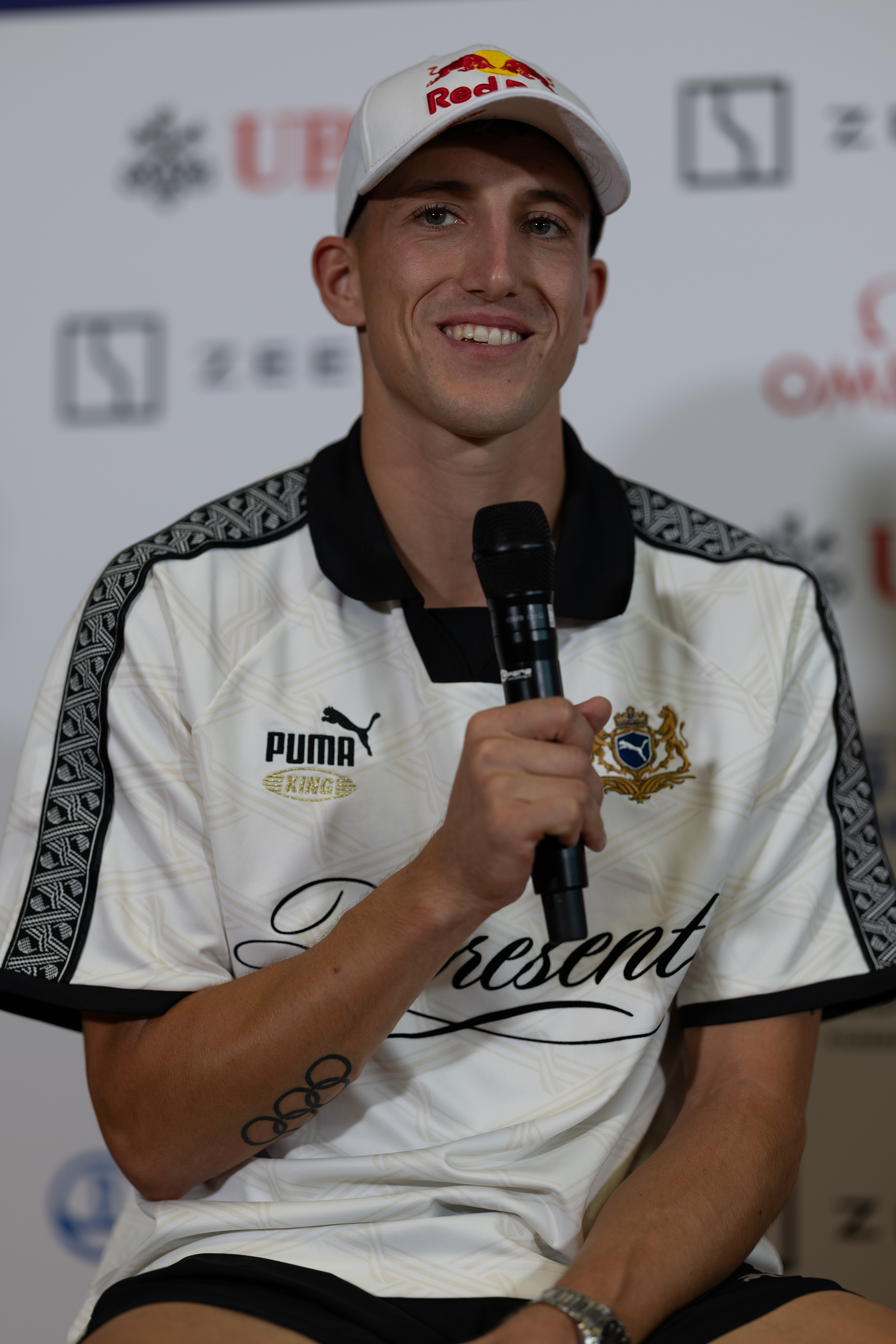
- Simon Ehammer at a Media Conference at the 2026 Wanda Diamond League’s Weltklasse Zürich athletics competition.

Personal information
- Nationality: Swiss
- Born: 7 February 2000 (age 26) Stein, Appenzell, Switzerland
- Height: 1.84 m (6 ft 0 in)
- Weight: 80 kg (176 lb)

Sport
- Country: Switzerland
- Sport: Athletics
- Events: Decathlon, heptathlon, Long jump, 110 meters hurdles

Achievements and titles
- Personal bests: Decathlon: 8,575 NR (2025); Heptathlon: 6,670 WR (2026)
Medal record
Men's athletics
Representing Switzerland
World Championships
Bronze medal – third place	2022 Eugene	Long jump
World Ultimate Championship
Third place	2026 Budapest	Long jump
World Indoor Championships
Gold medal – first place	2024 Glasgow	Heptathlon
Gold medal – first place	2026 Toruń	Heptathlon
Silver medal – second place	2022 Belgrade	Heptathlon
Diamond League
First place	2023	Long jump
First place	2025	Long jump
European Championships
Silver medal – second place	2022 Munich	Decathlon
Silver medal – second place	2026 Birmingham	Long jump
Bronze medal – third place	2024 Rome	Long jump
European Indoor Championships
Silver medal – second place	2025 Apeldoorn	Heptathlon
European Games
Bronze medal – third place	2023 Kraków-Małopolska	Long jump
European U23 Championships
Gold medal – first place	2021 Tallinn	Long Jump
European U20 Championships
Gold medal – first place	2019 Borås	Decathlon

Simon Ehammer (born 7 February 2000) is a Swiss athlete who competes in the decathlon, heptathlon, long jump, and 110 meters hurdles. He won the long jump event at the 2021 European Athletics U23 Championships and was the bronze medalist in the long jump at the 2022 World Athletics Championships.

== Personal bests ==
Information from World Athletics profile unless otherwise noted.

Indoor

As of 21 March 2026

Individual events
Event	Performance	Location	Date
60 metres	6.82	St. Gallen	23 January 2022
200 metres	22.01	Magglingen	25 January 2020
60 m hurdles	7.55	St. Gallen	18 February 2024
Long jump	8.22 m (26 ft 11 1/2 in)	Magglingen	26 February 2022
High jump	2.03 m (6 ft 7 3/4 in)	Zurich	12 January 2019
Pole vault	5.20 m (17 ft 1/2 in)	St. Gallen	17 February 2024
Shot put	14.22 m (46 ft 7 3/4 in)	St. Gallen	24 January 2021

Combined events
Event	Performance	Location	Date	Score
Heptathlon	—N/a	Toruń	20–21 March 2026	6,670 points
60 metres	6.69	Toruń	20 March 2026	995 points
Long jump	8.26 m (27 ft 1 in)^{[b]}	Aubière	29 January 2022	1,128 points
Shot put	15.31 m (50 ft 2 3/4 in)	Magglingen	6 February 2021	809 points
High jump	2.03 m (6 ft 7 3/4 in)	Aubière	28 January 2023	831 points
60 m hurdles	7.52^{[b]}	Toruń	21 March 2026	1,106 points
Pole vault	5.30 m (17 ft 4 1/2 in)	Toruń	21 March 2026	1,004 points
1000 metres	2:41.04	Toruń	21 March 2026	862 points
Virtual Best Performance				6,735 points

^{b} Heptathlon best

Outdoor

As of 20 September 2025

Individual events
Event	Performance	Location	Date
100 metres	10.51 (+0.9 m/s)	Nottwil	4 September 2021
200 metres	21.14 (+1.9 m/s)	Frankfurt	15 August 2020
300 metres	33.64	Willisau	6 May 2023
400 metres	48.37	Schaan	17 May 2025
110 m hurdles	13.38 (−0.1 m/s)	Winterthur	29 June 2024
Long jump	8.41 m (27 ft 7 in) (−0.6 m/s)	Rome	7 June 2024
High jump	2.05 m (6 ft 8 1/2 in)	Aarau	8 September 2018
Pole vault	5.35 m (17 ft 6 1/2 in)	Frauenfeld	23 August 2025
Shot put	14.26 m (46 ft 9 1/4 in)	Basel	1 May 2022
Discus throw	42.72 m (140 ft 1 3/4 in)	Schaan	17 May 2025
Javelin throw	52.40 m (171 ft 10 3/4 in)	Basel	1 May 2022

Combined events
Event	Performance	Location	Date	Score
Decathlon	—N/a	Götzis	31 May–1 June 2025	8,575 points
100 metres	10.34 (+1.3 m/s)	Götzis	18 May 2024	1,013 points
Long jump	8.45 m (27 ft 8 1/2 in) (+0.2 m/s)^{[a]}	Götzis	28 May 2022	1,178 points
Shot put	14.68 m (48 ft 1 3/4 in)	Ratingen	7 May 2022	770 points
High jump	2.08 m (6 ft 9 3/4 in)	Munich	15 August 2022	878 points
400 metres	47.18	Götzis	31 May 2025	949 points
110 m hurdles	13.55 (−0.4 m/s)	Götzis	19 May 2024	1,033 points
Discus throw	41.54 m (136 ft 3 1/4 in)	Brescia	27 April 2025	696 points
Pole vault	5.20 m (17 ft 1/2 in)	Munich	16 August 2022	972 points
Javelin throw	55.98 m (183 ft 7 3/4 in)	Götzis	29 May 2022	678 points
1500 metres	4:42.54	Langenthal	9 August 2020	664 points
Virtual Best Performance				8,831 points

^{a} Decathlon best

== International competitions ==
Year	Tournament	Venue	Rank	Event	Result	Ref.
2019	European U20 Championships	Borås	1st	Decathlon	7851 points	NU20R
2021	European Indoor Championships	Toruń	-	Heptathlon	DNF	
2021	European U23 Championships	Tallinn	1st	Long jump	8.10 m	SB
2022	World Indoor Championships	Belgrade	2nd	Heptathlon	6363 points	NR
2022	World Championships	Eugene	3rd	Long jump	8.16 m	
2022	European Championships	Munich	2nd	Decathlon	8468 points	NR
2023	European Indoor Championships	Istanbul	–	Heptathlon	DNF	
2023	European Games	Chorzów	3rd	Long Jump	7.95 m	
2023	World Championships	Budapest	9th	Long jump	7.87 m	
2024	World Indoor Championships	Glasgow	1st	Heptathlon	6418 points	NR
2024	European Championships	Rome	3rd	Long jump	8.31 m	
2024	Olympic Games	Paris	4th	Long jump	8.20 m	
2025	European Indoor Championships	Apeldoorn	2nd	Heptathlon	6506 points	
2025	World Indoor Championships	Nanjing	9th	Long jump	7.99 m	
2025	World Championships	Tokyo	4th	Long jump	8.30 m	
2025	World Championships	Tokyo	–	Decathlon	DNF	
2026	World Indoor Championships	Toruń	1st	Heptathlon	6670 pts	WR
2026	European Championships	Birmingham	2nd	Long jump	8.29 m	
2026	World Ultimate Championship	Budapest	3rd	Long jump	8.07 m	
