= Luc Brewin =

French decathlete (born 2002)

Personal information
- Born: 22 November 2002 (age 23) Levallois-Perret, France
- Height: 182 cm (6 ft 0 in)
- Weight: 81 kg (179 lb)

Sport
- Country: France
- Sport: Athletics
- Events: Decathlon, Heptathlon
- Club: US Talence Athlétisme
- Coached by: Gaëtan Blouin; Jonathan Baleston-Robineau

Achievements and titles
- Personal bests: Heptathlon: 6199 (Aubière, 2025); Decathlon: 7963 (Talence, 2024)

Luc Brewin (born 22 November 2002) is a French multi-event athlete.

== Career ==
Brewin placed eighth in the decathlon in Espoo, Finland at the 2023 European Athletics U23 Championships, with 7794 points. In 2024, he moved to be trained by Gaëtan Blouin and Jonathan Baleston-Robineau in Talence, France. In September 2024, he set a decathlon personal best of 7963 points competing in Talence.

He set an indoor heptathlon personal best of 6199 points in Aubière in January 2025, and set personal bests in six of the seven events; 60m in 6.81 seconds, shot put with 14.06m, high jump with 1.95m, 60m hurdles in 7.88, pole vault with 5.22m and 1000m in 2:46.08. The result moved him to fifth on the French all-time list.

He was selected for the 2025 European Athletics Indoor Championships in Appeldoorn. However, he had to pull out of the competition at the mid-way point, having equalled his personal best of 1.95 metres in the high jump.

Brewin placed third at the 2026 French Indoor Athletics Championships in Aubiere with 5834 points.

== Personal life ==
He attended Loughborough University in England but was born and grew up in France. Before that he attended the Ecole Diagonale in Paris and local athletic club Vincennes Athletic.
