= Ken Mullings =

Bahamian athlete

Personal information
- Nationality: Bahamian
- Born: 28 April 1997 (age 29) Freeport, The Bahamas

Sport
- Sport: Athletics
- Event: Decathlon

Achievements and titles
- Personal bests: Heptathlon: 6340 (Champaign, 2024); Decathlon: 8226 (Paris, 2024) NR

Ken Mullings (born 28 April 1997) is a multi-event athlete from The Bahamas.

== Early life ==
Mullings has a twin sister Kennedi and a brother Aaron. His mother Eulease is an accounts clerk. Mullings attended CC Sweeting High School before going on to study at the University of the Bahamas.

== Career ==
Mullings competed for the University of the Bahamas. He set a new national record in the decathlon in finishing sixth at the 2019 Pan American Games in Peru. In January 2020, he broke his own national record for the heptathlon, in Indiana.

At the Bahamas Association of Athletic Associations’ Easter Track Classic in April 2021, he scored a personal best 7,642 points, finishing second to Kendrick Thompson. He again set a personal best decathlon points tally of 7,734 on June 27, 2021 at Thomas A Robinson National Stadium. The following year, he finished in 17th place overall in the men’s decathlon at the 2022 World Athletics Championships in Eugene, Oregon with a total of 7,866 points. He also won the NACAC (North American, Central American and Caribbean Athletic Association) Combined Events Area Championships, scoring 7,537 combined points at the Terry Fox Athletic Facility in Ottawa, Canada, in 2022.

Mullings competed at the 2023 Pan American Games in Chile, in the decathlon. He set a new decathlon PB of 8,060 in 2023. In a heptathlon in Illinois at the end of January 2024, Mullings set PBs in six of the seven disciplines, winning with a national record of 6340. That month he also set a new national record for the pole vault, in Illinois.

He was selected to compete at the 2024 World Athletics Indoor Championships in Glasgow in which he finished fourth overall.

He ran a 10.45 personal best for the 100 metres at the HypoMeeting in Gotzis in May 2024.

He competed in Paris at the 2024 Summer Olympics in the decathlon, finishing in 13th place overall, with a new national record tally of 8226 points.
