= Ondřej Kopecký =

Czech multi-event athlete (born 1998)

Personal information
- Born: 16 May 1998 (age 28)

Sport
- Sport: Athletics
- Event: Decathlon

Achievements and titles
- Personal bests: Decathlon: 8310 (Prague, 2022); Heptathlon: 6035 (Prague, 2024)

Ondřej Kopecký (born 16 May 1998) is a Czech multi-event athlete. He is a multiple-time Czech national champion in the decathlon and competed in the heptathlon at the 2024 World Athletics Indoor Championships.

== Biography ==
He won his first Czech national titles in the decathlon at the Czech Combined Events Championships in 2021 and 2022. In 2022, he improved his personal best tally for the decathlon to 8310 points. He travelled to compete at the 2022 World Athletics Championships in Eugene, Oregon but tore his hamstring in the warm-up before the first event and was unable to compete.

Along with fellow Czech multi-eventer Vilém Stráský, he is coached by former Olympic champion Roman Šebrle. He placed sixth overall at the 2023 European Athletics Indoor Championships in Istanbul, Turkey in the indoor heptathlon with 5792 points in March 2023.

He placed ninth overall in the heptathlon at the 2024 World Athletics Indoor Championships in Glasgow, Scotland, with 5737 points. Unfortunately, injury ruled him out of competing at the 2024 European Championships.

He won the decathlon at the Czech Combined Events Championships ahead of Vilém Stráský in June 2025 with 8057 points. He won the decathlon and set a meeting record at the Wiesław Czapiewski Memorial in Nakło nad Notecią, Poland, a World Athletics Combined Events Tour Gold event in July, with 8254 points.

In September 2025, he competed in the decathlon at the 2025 World Athletics Championships in Tokyo, Japan.

In March 2026, he placed thirteenth competing in the heptathlon at the 2026 World Athletics Indoor Championships in Poland. In August, he competed at the 2026 European Athletics Championships in Birmingham, England, in decathlon.
