= Till Steinforth =

German athlete (born 2002)

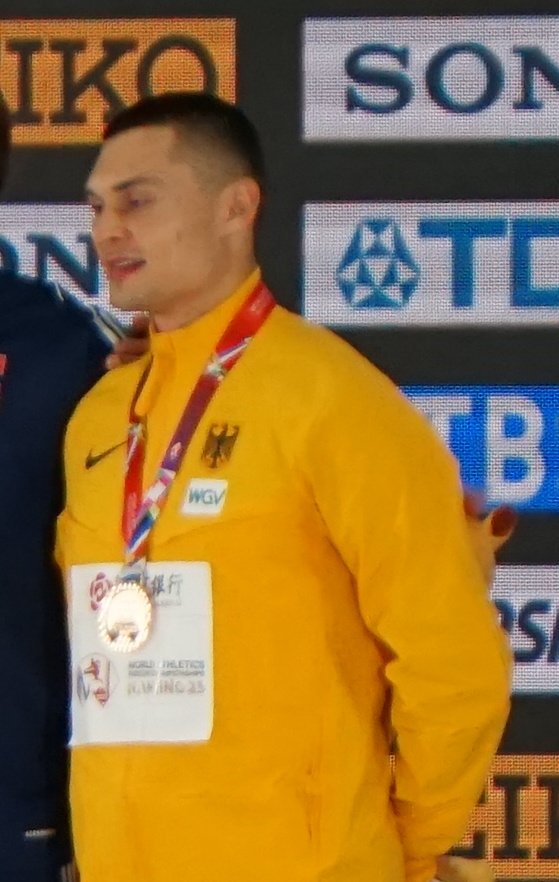
- Steinforth in 2025

Personal information
- Nationality: German
- Born: 11 June 2002 (age 24) Magdeburg, Germany

Sport
- Sport: Athletics
- Event: Decathlon

Achievements and titles
- Personal best(s): Decathlon: 8287 (Ratingen, 2024); Heptathlon: 6338 (Apeldoorn, 2025)
Medal record
Men's athletics
Representing Germany
World Indoor Championships
Bronze medal – third place	2025 Nanjing	Heptathlon
European Indoor Championships
Bronze medal – third place	2025 Apeldoorn	Heptathlon

Till Steinforth (born 11 June 2002) is a German multi-event athlete. He competed at the 2024 Paris Olympics in the decathlon. He was a bronze medalist at both the 2025 World Athletics Indoor Championships and the 2025 European Indoor Championships in the heptathlon in March 2025. That month, he set a new German record of 6338 points.

== Early life ==
From Saxony-Anhalt, he attended University of Nebraska–Lincoln in the United States to study architecture. Steinforth was named the 2024 Nebraska Male Athlete of the Year and the 2024 Indoor Midwest Region Men’s Field Athlete of the Year.

== Career ==
He finished fourth in the heptathlon at the NCAA Indoor Championships in March 2023 in Albuquerque, New Mexico. He won bronze in the heptathlon at the NCAA Indoor Championships in March 2024 in Boston, Massachusetts. In 2024, he became a four-time USTFCCCA First-Team All-American, a three-time Big Ten Champion, and was named the Big Ten Men’s Field Athlete of the Year.

Steinforth achieved a personal best score in the decathlon of 8287 points at the Mehrkampf-Meeting Ratingen in June 2024. He was originally named as an alternate, but was a late entry to compete in the decathlon at the 2024 Summer Olympics in Paris, finishing in 15th place overall.

On 8 March 2025, he was a bronze medalist in the heptathlon at the 2025 European Athletics Indoor Championships in Apeldoorn, Netherlands, with a new German national record tally of 6338 points. He was selected for the heptathlon at the 2025 World Athletics Indoor Championships in Nanjing, China in March 2025, where he again won the bronze medal.

In September 2025, he competed in the decathlon at the 2025 World Athletics Championships in Tokyo, Japan but was unable to finish the competition.
