= Peyton Bair =

American multi-event athlete

Personal information
- Nationality: United States
- Born: 20 September 2001 (age 24)
- Home town: Kimberly, Idaho
- Spouse: Jerzie Pluid
- Parents: Shae Jones-Bair; Brad Bair
- Relatives: Jaxon Bair (brother); Gatlin Bair (brother); Karlie Bair (sister); Londynn Bair (sister)

Sport
- Sport: Athletics / Track
- Events: Decathlon, Heptathlon
- College team: Mississippi State University (2023–2025), University of Oregon (2025–present)

Achievements and titles
- Personal bests: Decathlon: 8323 (NCAA Outdoor Championships 2025); Heptathlon: 6503 (NCAA Indoor Championships 2026)
Medal record
NCAA Outdoor Championships
Gold medal – first place	2025 NCAA Outdoor Championships	Decathlon
Silver medal – second place	2024 NCAA Outdoor Championships	Decathlon
NCAA Indoor Championships
Gold medal – first place	2026 NCAA Indoor Championships	Heptathlon
Gold medal – first place	2025 NCAA Indoor Championships	Heptathlon

Peyton Bair is an American multi-event athlete from Kimberly, ID. He won the indoor heptathlon at the 2025 and 2026 NCAA Indoor Championships, and the decathlon at the 2025 NCAA Outdoor Championships.

== Personal life ==
Bair is from Kimberly, Idaho. His parents were both athletes and coaches: his mother, Shae Jones-Bair, was an All-American pole vaulter and his father, Brad Bair, was a decathlete. He is a member of The Church of Jesus Christ of Latter-day Saints and served in the Arizona Mesa and Mexico Cancún missions.

Bair’s younger brother, Jaxon Bair, is also a collegiate multi-event track and field athlete at the University of Arkansas. Another younger brother, Gatlin Bair, is a football player committed to the University of Oregon following the completion of his LDS mission. He also has two younger sisters, Karlie and Londynn, who have excelled in junior athletics. The Bair siblings grew up training and pushing one another to develop into top-level athletes and well-rounded individuals.

On July 27, 2024, Bair married Jerzie Pluid.

Bair studied at Mississippi State University for a degree in biological sciences with concentrations in pre-medicine and physical therapy before transferring to the University of Oregon for his Senior year.

== High school career ==
Bair attended and competed for Kimberly High School.

2017 Freshman Season

Starting his freshman season he would win the gold medal at the Idaho State Track Championships in the 300m Hurdles and be runner up in the 110m Hurdles helping Kimberly as a team finish 2nd overall.

In the 2017 Club season Bair would be U16 category Region 11 Champion in the 110m hurdles and 400m hurdles and runner up in long jump. At the USA National Junior Olympic Championships he would place 8th in 400m hurdles and 15th in long jump.

2018 Sophomore Season

His Sophomore season his dominance in the 300m would grow leading the state with a then PR of 38.31. Peyton would go on to win 4 gold medals at the 2018 Idaho State Track Meet, 110m Hurdles, 300m Hurdles, Long Jump, and as a key part of the 4x400m Relay team. This helped Kimberly to finish at 2nd place again at state.

The 2018 Club Season was a busy one for Bair. At the USA National Junior Olympic Championships he would finish 3rd overall in the Decathlon with a score of 6301. Bair also finished 1st overall in the Long Jump, 2nd in the 100m, and 3rd in the 400m.

2019 Junior Season

In the high school season Peyton would run the fastest 300m Hurdle race ever by an Idaho Highschooler with a time of 37.41. He would later set the Idaho 3A State Championships Record in the race at a slightly slower 37.60. At the Idaho State Track and Field Championships Bair would again win gold in the 110m Hurdles, 300m Hurdles (w/ 3A State Record), Long Jump, and 4x400m Relay. Kimberly would place 2nd overall again at state. Peyton would also lead 3A State time in the 100m, 2nd in the 400m, 3rd in the 200m, and led in High Jump height.

In the club season Peyton would win the decathlon in the U18 category at the USA National Junior Olympic Championships placing first in the 100m, 400m, 110m Hurdles, High Jump, and Long Jump.

2020 Senior Season

In 2020 Peyton was named Idaho Gatorade Track and Field Runner of the Year.

Unfortunately like many other high schoolers Bair's Senior track season was ended after only one meet due to the COVID-19 Pandemic.

== Collegiate career ==
Bair attended and competed for Mississippi State University from 2023-2025 and will compete for the University of Oregon in the 2026 Season.

2023 Freshman Season

Returning from his 2-year mission, Bair worked to get his body and mind back into competition shape throughout his freshman season.

Bair would red shirt the Indoor Season.

In the Outdoor Season Bair would set a PR in the decathlon placing 3rd at the SEC Championships with a score of 7903. At the NCAA Outdoor Championships Bair would place 11th.

2024 Sophomore Season

In June 2024, he surpassed 8000 points in the decathlon for the first time, scoring 8131 points to finish runner-up to Leo Neugebauer at the 2024 NCAA Outdoor Championships in Eugene, Oregon, setting a personal best and a school record for Mississippi State.

Bair would also break Ashton Eaton’s record in the Decathlon 100m at the NCAA Championships with a time of 10.30.

2025 Junior Season

He won the indoor heptathlon at the 2025 NCAA Indoor Championships in Virginia Beach in March 2025 ahead of Jack Turner.

In June 2025, Bair won the decathlon at the 2025 NCAA Outdoor Championships in Eugene, Oregon with a personal-best 8,323 points.

During that competition he set NCAA Decathlon records in both the 100m (10.25 previous himself) and 400m (46.00 previous Ayden Owens-Delerme). He was also named the 2025 SEC Outdoor Track and Field Scholar-Athlete of the Year.

2026 Transfer Season

For the 2026 season Bair transferred to the University of Oregon. Having not competed in indoor track during his freshman year at Mississippi State, Bair retained a year of indoor eligibility and competed at Oregon as a junior in indoor standings. He subsequently redshirted the 2026 outdoor season, preserving his remaining eligibility for a full indoor and outdoor senior campaign in 2027.

In January 2026, he set a new personal best tally for the heptathlon of 6371 points at the Razorback Invitational in Fayetteville. Competing in the heptathlon at the 2026 NCAA Indoor Championships he set a new NCAA heptathlon record with a time of 6.67 seconds in the 60 m dash, also breaking Ashton Eaton's meet record for the discipline. He won the title the following day with a personal best score of 6503 points, moving him to sixth on world all-time list, and breaking Eaton's school record of 6,499 which stood as a world record when it was set in 2010.

2027 Senior Season

== Professional career ==
2024 Bair Competed in the US Olympic Trials placing 12th

2025 Bair Competed in US Nationals but did not finish due to injury.

2025 Bair reached a peak ranking of 10th in the world in the decathlon.

2026 Bair recorded the 6th best Heptathlon score in history with 6503
