= Téo Bastien =

French decathlete (born 2002)

Personal information
- Nationality: French
- Born: 9 October 2002 (age 23) Saint-Denis, Réunion
- Height: 192 cm (6 ft 4 in)
- Weight: 88 kg (194 lb)

Sport
- Country: France
- Sport: Athletics
- Events: Decathlon, Heptathlon
- Club: RC Arras
- Coached by: Gaëtan Blouin; Jonathan Baleston-Robineau

Achievements and titles
- Personal bests: Heptathlon: 6078 (Aubiere, 2026); Decathlon: 7976 (Montpellier, 2023)
Medal record
Men's athletics
Representing France
European U20 Championships
Bronze medal – third place	2021 Tallinn	Decathlon

Téo Bastien (born 9 October 2002) is a French multi-event athlete. In 2024, he became French national champion in the decathlon. In 2025 and 2026, he won the French national indoor championships in the heptathlon.

== Biography ==
Bastien won French national age-group titles in the decathlon in 2019, 2021 and 2022. He was a bronze medalist in the Decathlon at the 2021 European Athletics U20 Championships in Tallinn.

Bastien was runner-up in the heptathlon at the 2023 French Indoor Athletics Championships, behind Makenson Gletty. In 2023, he set a personal best decathlon tally in Montpellier of 7,976 points. However, it proved to be the only completed decathlon of his season.

Bastien won the decathlon at the 2024 French Athletics Championships with 7906 points in May 2024. He finished sixteenth at the decathlon at the 2024 European Athletics Championships in Rome. In July 2024, he became French Under-21 long jump champion title in Albi.

Bastien won the 2025 French Indoor Athletics Championships in the heptathlon in Miramas, in February 2025, with a tally of 6026 points. He was subsequently selected for the 2025 European Athletics Indoor Championships in Appeldoorn. However, a fall during the 60 metres hurdles ended his competition.

Bastien retained his heptathlon title at the 2026 French Indoor Athletics Championships in Aubiere with a personal best 6078 points. He placed sixth overall at the 2026 World Athletics Indoor Championships in Toruń, Poland.

== Personal life ==
He is from Réunion and competes for RC Arras. His sister, Maëva Bastien, is also a multi-event athlete.
