= Rasmus Roosleht =

Estonian athlete (born 2002)

Personal information
- Born: 25 July 2002 (age 24)

Sport
- Sport: Athletics
- Event: Decathlon

Achievements and titles
- Personal bests: Decathlon: 8336 (Ratigen, 2026); Heptathlon: 6062 (Apeldoorn, 2025)

Rasmus Roosleht (born 25 July 2002) is an Estonian multi-event athlete. He won the Decathlon at the Estonian Athletics Championships in 2024.

== Early life ==
From Pärnu, he studied for a degree in mathematics at Tallinn University.

== Career ==
Roosleht passed 8000 points for the decathlon for the first time with a tally of 8010 points at the 2023 European Athletics U23 Championships in Espoo, Finland, enough to finish in fifth place overall. He was named the best U23 athlete in Estonia for 2023.

Roosleht won the Estonian U23 Championships in the indoor heptathlon in Tallinn in January 2024. He made his debut amongst senior athletes at the Hypomeeting in Götzis, Austria, in May 2024. He won the senior decathlon title at the Estonian Athletics Championships in Tallinn in June 2024 with a new personal best of 8026 points. He was named the leading U23 athlete in Estonia for 2024, retaining the award he had also won the year previously.

Roosleht placed seventh overall in the indoor heptathlon at the 2025 European Athletics Indoor Championships in Apeldoorn, Netherlands in March 2025, with a personal best 6062 points which moved him to eleventh on the Estonian all-time list. He placed eleventh in the decathlon at the Hypo-Meeting in Götzis, Austria, in June 2025, improving his personal best by more than 200 points to record a tally of 8,241 points. He placed seventh at the Decastar event in Talence, France, the following month. He placed ninth overall in the season-long World Athletics Combined Events Tour for 2025.

Roosleht was selected for the 2026 World Athletics Indoor Championships in Toruń, Poland, in March 2026, placing eighth overall. In August, he competed at the 2026 European Athletics Championships in Birmingham, England, placing seventh overall in decathlon.
