= Jente Hauttekeete =

Belgian athlete

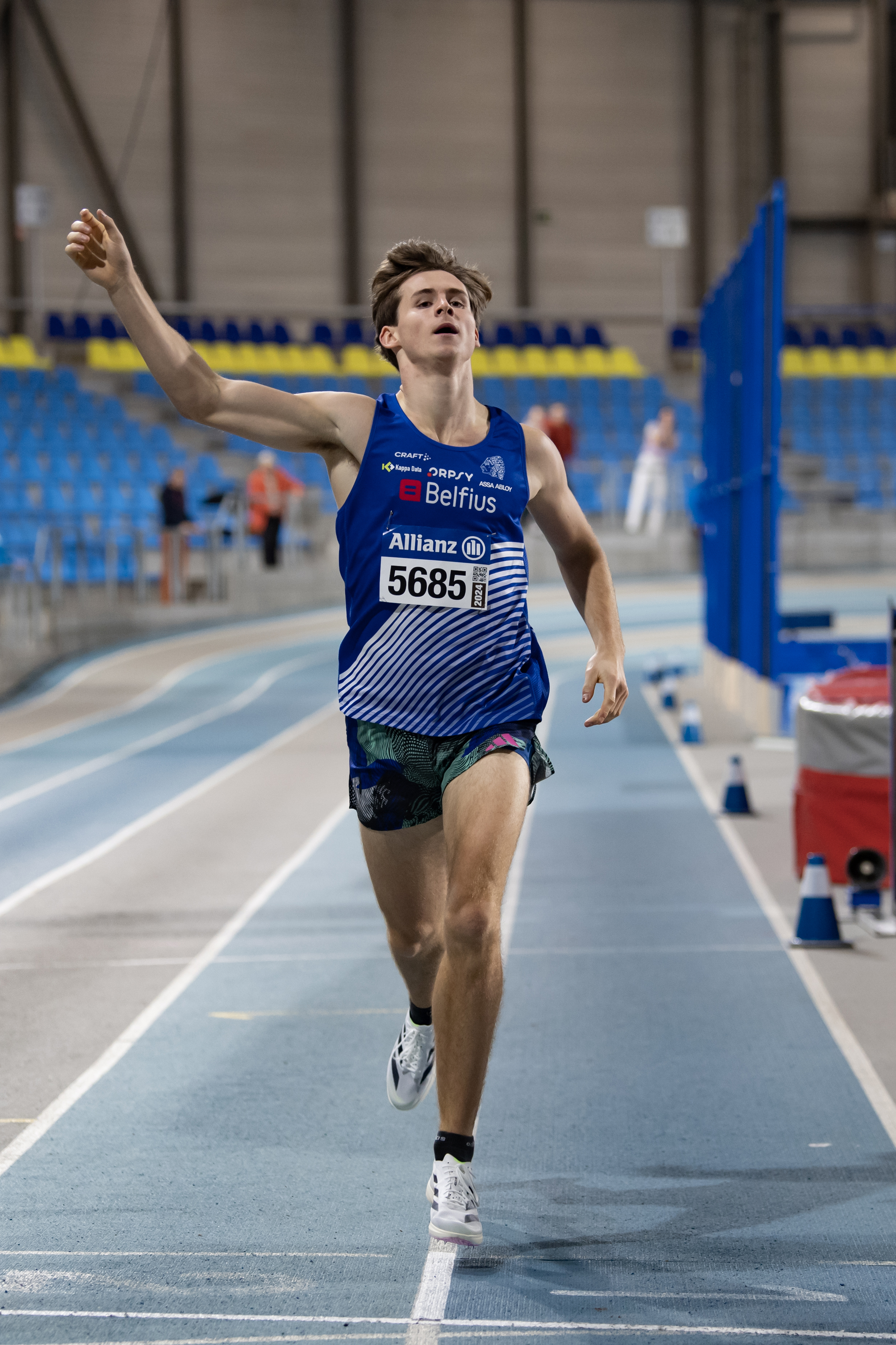
Jente Hauttekeete in 2024

Jente Hauttekeete (14 March 2002) is a Belgian athlete specializing in the heptathlon and the decathlon.

Hauttekeete was born in 2002. His father, Hendrik Hauttekeete, was a long jumper and sprinter, while his mother Melanie Moreels, a 6-times Belgian champion, was a specialist of the 400m hurdles and the heptathlon.

At the 2019 European Youth Summer Olympic Festival, he won the silver medal in the decathlon, behind Sander Skotheim.

In February 2021, he broke the world record in his age group (the under-20) for the heptathlon, becoming the first to break the 6000 points barrier.

In 2021, he won the European Athletics U20 Championships, breaking his own Belgian record for his age group with 8150 points, which was also the best performance by an under-20 athlete that year, and the 4th-best ever.

In February 2022, Hauttekeete won the Belgian Indoor Championships in the heptathlon with a total of 5680 points.

At the 2024 European Athletics Championships, he finished 8th in the decathlon with 8156 points, a new personal best.

Hauttekeette broke the Belgian U23 record and became the third best Belgian overall in the decathlon when he set a new personal record of 8268 points at the Décastar meeting in France in September 2024.

== Personal bests ==
Outdoor

As of 21 September 2025

Combined events
Event	Performance	Location	Date	Score
Decathlon	—	Talence	14–15 September 2024	8,268 points
100 metres	10.61 (+1.0 m/s)	Götzis	31 May 2025	901 points
Long jump	7.53 m (24 ft 8 1/4 in) (+0.6 m/s)	Götzis	31 May 2025	942 points
Shot put	15.18 m (49 ft 9 1/2 in)	Talence	5 July 2025	801 points
High jump	2.12 m (6 ft 11 1/4 in)	Espoo	15 July 2023	915 points
400 metres	48.25	Talence	14 September 2024	897 points
110 metres hurdles	13.79 (−1.1 m/s)	Brussels	3 August 2025	1,002 points
Discus throw	45.75 m (150 ft 1 in)	Oordegem	27 April 2025	782 points
Pole vault	5.20 m (17 ft 1/2 in)	Leuven	16 August 2025	972 points
Javelin throw	59.12 m (193 ft 11 1/2 in)	Talence	15 September 2024	725 points
1500 metres	4:27.91	Tokyo	21 September 2025	758 points
Virtual Best Performance				8,743 points

Indoor

As of 21 September 2025

Combined events
Event	Performance	Location	Date	Score
Heptathlon	—	Apeldoorn	7–8 March 2025	6,259 points
60 meters	6.93	Apeldoorn	7 March 2025	907 points
Long jump	7.33 m (24 ft 1/2 in)	Frankfurt	13 February 2021	893 points
Shot put	14.98 m (49 ft 1 3/4 in)	Apeldoorn	7 March 2025	788 points
High jump	2.12 m (6 ft 11 1/4 in)	Aubiére	28 January 2023	915 points
60 metres hurdles	7.95	Apeldoorn	8 March 2025	944 points
Pole vault	5.10 m (16 ft 8 3/4 in)	Apeldoorn	8 March 2025	941 points
1000 meters	2:39.82	Apeldoorn	8 March 2025	875 points
Virtual Best Performance				6,313 points
