= Sander Skotheim =

Norwegian decathlete (born 2002)

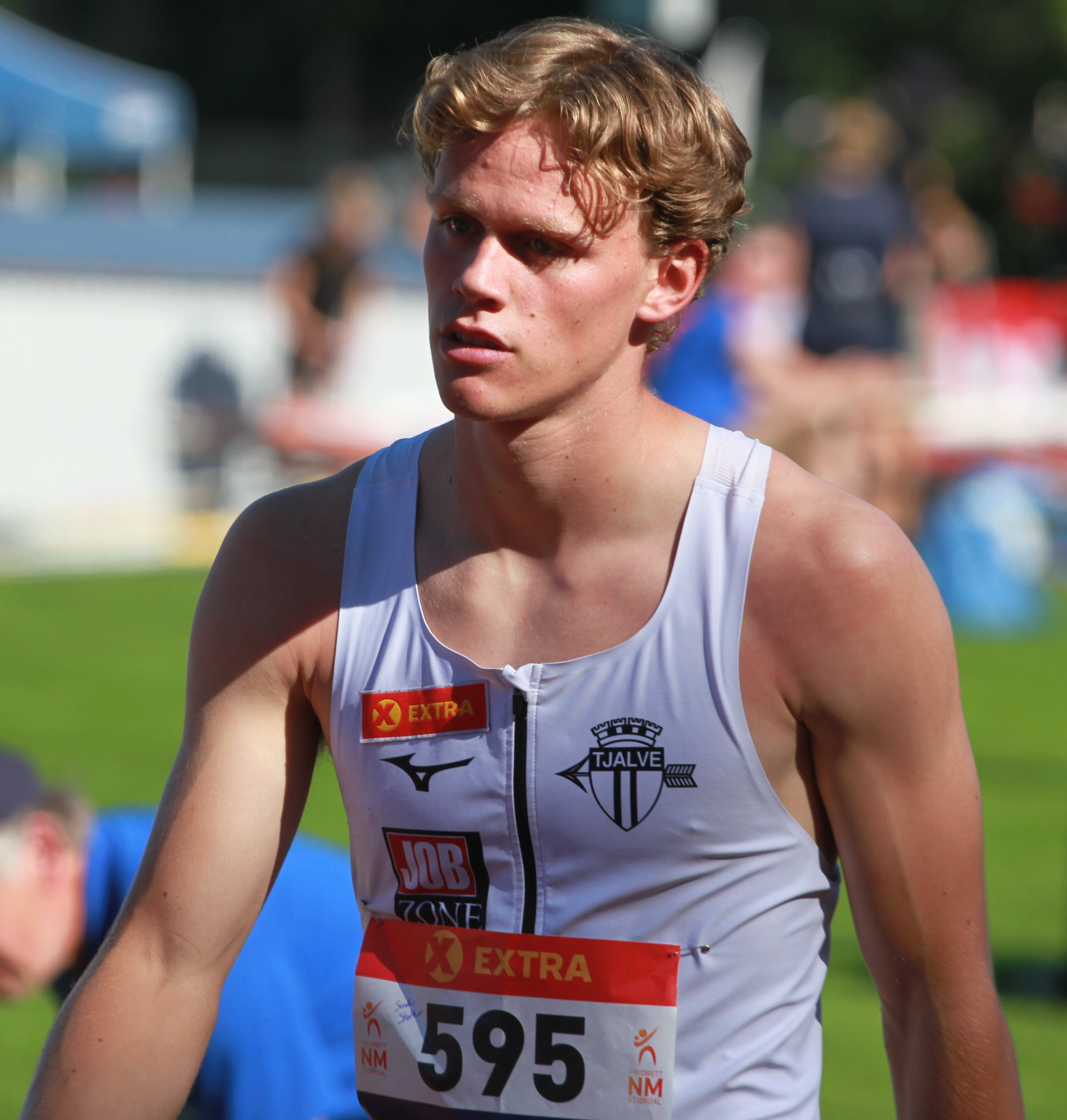
- Skotheim in 2022

Personal information
- Nationality: Norway
- Born: Sander Aae Skotheim; 31 May 2002 (age 24) Oslo, Norway
- Height: 186 cm (6 ft 1 in)

Sport
- Sport: Track and Field
- Events: Decathlon, Heptathlon
- Club: IL Koll; IK Tjalve

Achievements and titles
- Personal bests: Decathlon: 8,909 (2025) NR; Heptathlon: 6,558 (2025) NR
Medal record
Men's athletics
Representing Norway
World Indoor Championships
Gold medal – first place	2025 Nanjing	Heptathlon
Silver medal – second place	2024 Glasgow	Heptathlon
European Championships
Silver medal – second place	2024 Rome	Decathlon
Bronze medal – third place	2026 Birmingham	Decathlon
European Indoor Championships
Gold medal – first place	2025 Apeldoorn	Heptathlon
Silver medal – second place	2023 Istanbul	Heptathlon
European U23 Championships
Silver medal – second place	2023 Espoo	Decathlon
European U20 Championships
Silver medal – second place	2021 Tallinn	Decathlon
European Youth Olympic Festival
Gold medal – first place	2019 Baku	Decathlon

Sander Aae Skotheim (born 31 May 2002) is a Norwegian multi-event athlete. He is a European Championships silver and bronze medallist in decathlon, and a World Indoor Championships and European Indoor Championships gold and silver medallist in heptathlon. Skotheim is also a European U20 and U23 silver medallist, and a European Youth Olympic Festival gold medallist in decathlon. He competed in the decathlon event at the 2024 Summer Olympics in Paris.

== Biography ==
Skotheim won gold in Athletics at the 2019 European Youth Summer Olympic Festival in the decathlon in Baku, and silver at the 2021 European Athletics U20 Championships decathlon in Tallinn. In 2022, Skotheim won the senior indoor Norwegian championship in the heptathlon and won individual indoor medals including the gold in the high jump, silver in the triple jump and bronze in the long jump. Skotheim also won gold in the senior outdoor Norwegian championships in 2022, triumphing in the 110 metres hurdles and the high jump.

Whilst competing at the 2022 World Athletics Championships, Skotheim broke his personal best in the 100 metres, going under 11 seconds for the first time to set a new fastest time of 10.88 seconds. He also set a new personal best in the high jump as he reached a discipline winning mark of 2.17. After the first day of the event he was placed seventh overall before finishing fifteenth.

At the 2023 European Athletics Indoor Championships Skotheim finished with the silver medal in the heptathlon, close behind the decathlon world record holder Kevin Mayer. Competing at Götzis in May 2023, he set a Norwegian National record in decathlon with 8590 points. At the 2023 European Athletics U23 Championships, in Espoo, Finland, he won the silver medal in the decathlon.

In March 2024 he won silver in the heptathlon at the 2024 World Athletics Indoor Championships in Glasgow. Competing in the decathlon he was a silver medalist at the 2024 European Athletics Championships in Rome in June 2024 with a personal best tally of 8635 points. Skotheim competed in the decathlon event at the 2024 Summer Olympics in Paris, finishing eighteenth overall after failing his jumps in the pole vault. He finished second overall in the 2024 World Athletics Combined Events Tour.

In February 2025, he scored 6484 points to break the European heptathlon record and move to fifth on the world all-time list at the World Athletics Combined Events Tour Silver meeting in Tallinn, Estonia. That month, he won the high jump and long jump titles at the Norwegian Indoor Championships. In March 2025, he won the gold medal in the heptathlon at the 2025 European Athletics Indoor Championships and broke his own European heptathlon record, scoring 6558 to move to third on the world indoor heptathlon all-time list. His competition included a personal best 6.93 in the 60 metres, an equal championship heptathlon best of 2.19m in the high jump, and a championship heptathlon best in the 1000m of 2:32.72. He followed that by also winning gold in the heptathlon at the 2025 World Athletics Indoor Championships in Nanjing in March 2025.

On 1 June 2025, he won the Hypo-Meeting in Götzis with 8909 points to reclaim the Norwegian national record, surpassing the tally with which Markus Rooth had won the 2024 Olympic Games. In September 2025, he competed in the decathlon at the 2025 World Athletics Championships in Tokyo, Japan, but disqualified during the 110 metres hurdles at the start of the second day for pushing a hurdle. He had been in second place after the first day of the competition. He won the season-long World Athletics Combined Events Tour for 2025.

Skotheim won the bronze medal in the decathlon at the 2026 European Championships in Birmingham, England, finishing with a total of 8433 points. In September 2026, Skotheim scored 8630 points to win the Décastar in Talence with his best score of the year.

== Personal bests ==
Information from World Athletics profile unless otherwise noted.

Outdoor

As of 16 October 2025

Individual events
Event	Performance	Location	Date
200 metres	21.82 (+0.5 m/s)	Bærum	27 August 2022
800 metres	1:55.18	Bærum	28 August 2022
110 metres hurdles	13.97 (+1.4 m/s)	Jessheim	6 July 2023
Long jump	7.94 m (26 ft 1/2 in) (+0.0 m/s)	Sandnes	27 June 2024
High jump	2.18 m (7 ft 1 3/4 in)	Jessheim	6 July 2023
Triple jump	16.07 m (52 ft 8 1/2 in) (+0.1 m/s)	Borås	24 August 2024
Pole vault	5.35 m (17 ft 6 1/2 in)	Oslo	28 June 2023
Discus throw	46.92 m (153 ft 11 in)	Oslo	1 June 2024
Javelin throw	62.39	Jessheim	23 August 2025

Combined events
Event	Performance	Location	Date	Score
Decathlon	—N/a	Götzis	31 May–1 June 2025	8,909 points
100 metres	10.70 (+0.7 m/s)	Götzis	31 May 2025	929 points
Long jump	8.06 (+0.7 m/s)	Götzis	31 May 2025	1,076 points
Shot put	13.98 m (45 ft 10 1/4 in)	Götzis	31 May 2025	727 points
High jump	2.17 m (7 ft 1 1/4 in)	Eugene	23 July 2022	963 points
400 metres	47.02	Paris	2 August 2024	957 points
110 metres hurdles	14.12 (−1.2 m/s)	Götzis	1 June 2025	959 points
Discus throw	49.18 m (161 ft 4 in)	Götzis	1 June 2025	853 points
Pole vault	5.10 m (16 ft 8 3/4 in)	Götzis	1 June 2025	941 points
Javelin throw	61.55 m (201 ft 11 in)	Grosseto	1 May 2022	761 points
1500 metres	4:16.60	Espoo	16 July 2023	835 points
Virtual Best Performance				9,001 points

Indoor

As of 16 October 2025

Individual events
Event	Performance	Location	Date
60 metres	6.99	Bærum	20 January 2023
800 metres	2:00.82	Sandnes	24 February 2019
60 metres hurdles	7.93	Bærum	11 February 2024
Long jump	7.83 m (25 ft 8 1/4 in)	Espoo	9 February 2025
High jump	2.20 m (7 ft 2 1/2 in)	Karlstad	12 February 2023
Triple jump	15.84 m (51 ft 11 1/2 in)	Uppsala	13 February 2022
Pole vault	5.11 m (16 ft 9 in)	Bærum	20 January 2024
Shot put	14.27 m (46 ft 9 3/4 in)	Bærum	22 February 2025

Combined events
Event	Performance	Location	Date	Score
Heptathlon	—N/a	Apeldoorn	7–8 March 2025	6,558 points
60 metres	6.93	Apeldoorn	7 March 2025	907 points
Long jump	8.19 m (26 ft 10 1/4 in)	Tallinn	1 February 2025	1,110 points
Shot put	15.00 m (49 ft 2 1/2 in)	Tallinn	1 February 2025	790 points
High jump	2.19 m (7 ft 2 in)	Istanbul	4 March 2023	982 points
60 metres hurdles	7.93	Nanjing	23 March 2025	999 points
Pole vault	5.25 m (17 ft 2 1/2 in)	Tallinn	2 February 2025	988 points
1000 metres	2:32.72	Apeldoorn	8 March 2025	956 points
Virtual Best Performance				6,732 points
