= Heptathlon =

Track and field competition with 7 events

Athletics Heptathlon
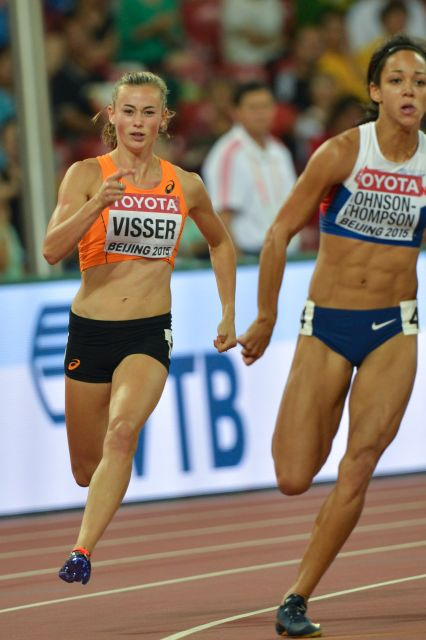
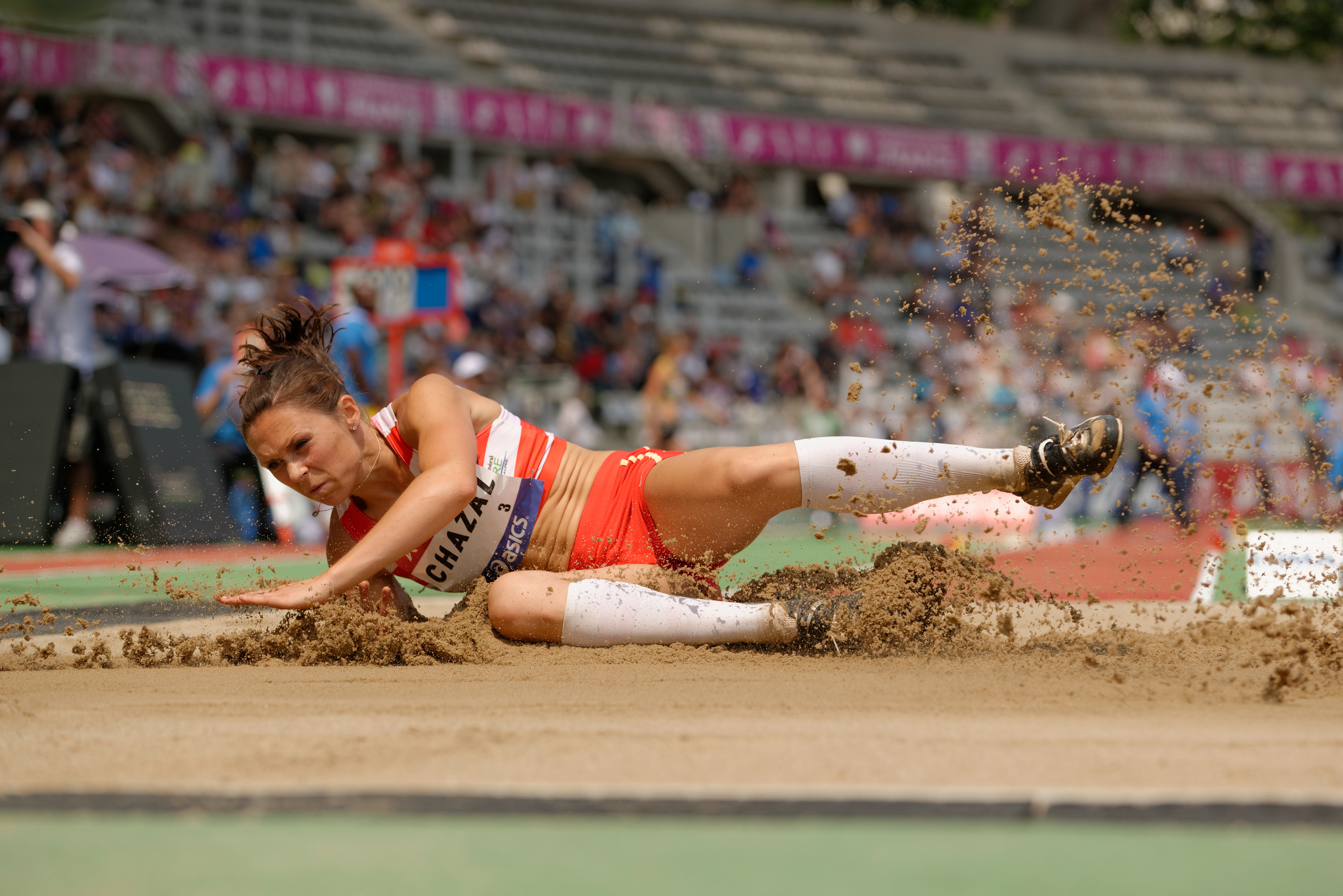
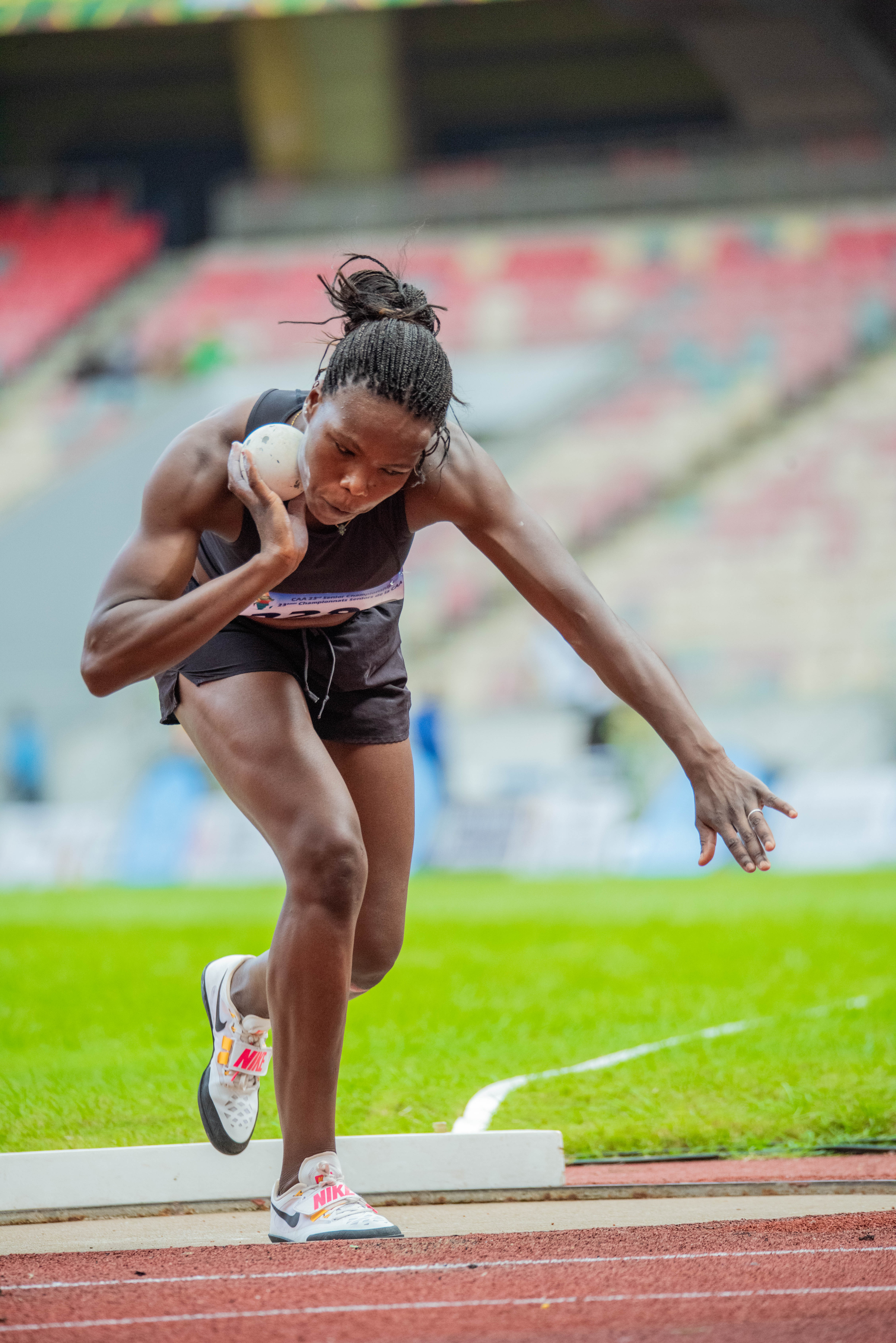
- The women's heptathlon combines three runs, two jumps, and two throws.

World records
- Men: (Switzerland) Simon Ehammer 6670 pts (2026)
- Women: (United States) Jackie Joyner-Kersee 7291 pts (1988)

Olympic records
- Women: (United States) Jackie Joyner-Kersee 7291 pts (1988)

World Championship records
- Women: (United States) Jackie Joyner-Kersee 7128 pts (1987)

World Indoor Championship records
- Men: (Switzerland) Simon Ehammer 6670 pts (2026)

A heptathlon is a track and field combined events contest made up of seven events. The name derives from the Greek ἑπτά (hepta, meaning "seven") and ἄθλος (áthlos, or ἄθλον, áthlon, meaning "competition"). A competitor in a heptathlon is referred to as a heptathlete.

There are two heptathlons – the men's and the women's heptathlon – composed of different events. The men's heptathlon is older and is currently held indoors, contested at the IAAF World Indoor Championships in Athletics. The women's heptathlon is held outdoors and was introduced in the 1980s, first appearing in the Olympics in 1984. It is currently contested in the athletics programme of the Olympics and at the World Athletics Championships.

== Women's heptathlon ==
Women's heptathlon is the combined event for women contested in the athletics programme of the Olympics and at the World Athletics Championships. The World Athletics Combined Events Tour determines a yearly women's heptathlon champion. The women's outdoor heptathlon consists of the following events, with the first four contested on the first day, and the remaining three on day two:

- 100 metres hurdles
- High jump
- Shot put
- 200 metres
- Long jump
- Javelin throw
- 800 metres

The heptathlon has been contested by female athletes since the early 1980s, when it replaced the pentathlon as the primary women's combined event contest (the javelin throw and 200 m were added). It was first contested at the Olympic level in the 1984 Summer Olympics. In recent years some women's decathlon competitions have been conducted, consisting of the same events as the men's competition in a slightly different order, and World Athletics has begun keeping records for it, but the heptathlon remains the championship-level combined event for women. Nafissatou Thiam, representing Belgium, is the 2024 Olympic Gold Medallist, after successfully defending her previous 2016 and 2020 titles. Anna Hall, representing USA, is the current World Champion. Kate O'Connor, representing Ireland, is the current European Champion and also the current Commonwealth Champion (representing Northern Ireland). Odile Ahouanwanou. Yekaterina Voronina, Kiara Reddingius, Luisarys Toledo and Ariana Ince hold the African, Asian, Oceanian, South American and NACAC (North American, Central American and Caribbean) titles respectively. Adriana Rodríguez, Marthe Koala, Swapna Barman and Elenani Tinai hold the Panamerican Games, African Games, Asian Games and Pacific Games titles respectively.

There is also a Tetradecathlon, which is a double heptathlon, consisting of 14 events, seven events per day.

=== Points system ===
The heptathlon scoring system was devised by Dr Karl Ulbrich, a Viennese mathematician. The formulae are constructed so that, for each event, a designated benchmark performance (for example, approximately 1.82 m for the high jump) scores 1000 points. Each event also has a minimum recordable performance level (e.g. 0.75 m for the high jump), corresponding to zero points. The formulae are devised so that successive constant increments in performance correspond to gradually increasing increments in points awarded.

The events are split into three groups, and the scores are calculated according to the three formulae:

Running events (200 m, 800 m and 100 m hurdles):

$P = INT (a \cdot (b - T)^c$)

Jumping events (high jump and long jump):

$P = INT (a \cdot (M - b)^c$)

Throwing events (shot put and javelin):

$P = INT (a \cdot (D - b)^c$)

P is points, T is time in seconds, M is height or distance in centimeters and D is distance in meters. INT is the integer function, also known as the floor function, signifying that the result is rounded down to the nearest lower (or equal) whole number. a, b and c have different values for each of the events, as follows:

Event	a	b	c
200 metres	4.99087	42.5	1.81
800 metres	0.11193	254	1.88
100 metres hurdles	9.23076	26.7	1.835
High jump	1.84523	75	1.348
Long jump	0.188807	210	1.41
Shot put	56.0211	1.5	1.05
Javelin throw	15.9803	3.8	1.04

=== Benchmarks ===
The following table shows the benchmark levels needed to earn 1000, 900, 800 and 700 points in each event.

Event	1000 pts	900 pts	800 pts	700 pts	Unit
100 m hurdles	13.85	14.56	15.32	16.12	Seconds
High jump	1.82	1.74	1.66	1.57	Metres
Shot put	17.07	15.58	14.09	12.58	Metres
200 m	23.80	24.86	25.97	27.14	Seconds
Long jump	6.48	6.17	5.84	5.50	Metres
Javelin throw	57.18	52.04	46.87	41.68	Metres
800 m	2:07.63	2:14.52	2:21.77	2:29.47	Minutes:Seconds

=== Women's world records compared with heptathlon bests ===
World records (WR) compared with heptathlon bests (HB)
Event	Type	Athlete	Record	Score	Difference in points value	Date	Place	Notes/Ref.
100 m hurdles	WR	Masai Russell	12.09 s	1265				
100 m hurdles	HB	Jessica Ennis	12.54 s (+1.3 m/s)	1195	−70	3 August 2012	London	
High jump	WR	Yaroslava Mahuchikh	2.10 m	1373				
High jump	HB	Nafissatou Thiam	2.02 m	1264	−109	22 June 2019	Talence	
Shot put	WR	Natalya Lisovskaya	22.63 m	1378				
Shot put	HB	Austra Skujytė	17.31 m (Note: In 1977, Eva Wilms threw 20.79 m during a pentathlon event, which is sometimes referred to as the heptathlon best.)	1016	−362	3 August 2012	London	
200 m	WR	Florence Griffith Joyner	21.34 s	1251				
200 m	HB	Jackie Joyner Kersee	22.30 s (+0.0 m/s)	1150	−101	15 July 1988	Indianapolis	
Long jump	WR	Galina Chistyakova	7.52 m	1351				
Long jump	HB	Jackie Joyner Kersee	7.27 m (+0.7 m/s)	1264	−87	24 September 1988	Seoul	
Javelin (Note: Women's javelin was redesigned in 1999 and all records started afresh. Point allocation for Heptathlon remained the same, but the comparison is being made between the WR and Heptathlon best of the current model.)	WR	Barbora Špotáková	72.28 m	1295				Current 1999 model
Javelin	HB	Barbora Špotáková	60.90 m	1072	−223	16 September 2012	Talence	Current 1999 model
Javelin	WR	Petra Felke	80.00 m	1448				Old model
Javelin	HB	Tessa Sanderson	64.64 m	1145	−303			Old model
800 m	WR	Jarmila Kratochvílová	1:53.28 min:s	1224				
800 m	HB	Anna Hall	2:01.23 min:s	1097	−127	1 June 2025	Götzis	
Total	World record			9137				
Total	Heptathlon bests			8058	−1079			

== Indoor heptathlon ==
The other heptathlon discipline is an indoor competition, normally contested by men only. It is the men's combined event in the IAAF World Indoor Championships in Athletics. The indoor heptathlon consists of the following events, with the first four contested on the first day, and remaining three on day two:

- 60 metres
- long jump
- shot put
- high jump
- 60 metres hurdles
- pole vault
- 1000 metres

The scoring is similar for both disciplines. In each event, the athlete scores points for their performance in each event according to scoring tables issued by World Athletics. The athlete accumulating the highest number of points wins the competition.

The indoor heptathlon is also rarely contested by women; at the 2024 indoor X-Athletics meeting, French combined events athlete Noémi Desailly won the indoor women's heptathlon with 5761 points while Jordyn Bruce set an unofficial American record in 2nd. It was labeled the first indoor women's heptathlon.

=== Benchmarks ===
The following table shows the minimum benchmark levels required to earn 1000 points in each event.

Event	1000pts	Units
60 m	6.67	Seconds
Long jump	7.76	Metres
Shot put	18.40	Metres
High jump	2.21	Metres
60 m hurdles	7.92	Seconds
Pole vault	5.29	Metres
1000 m	2:29.00	Minutes:Seconds

=== Men's world records compared with heptathlon bests ===
World indoor records (WR) compared with heptathlon bests (HB)
Event	Type	Athlete	Record	Score	Difference in points value	Ref.
60 m
60 m	WR	Christian Coleman	6.34 s	1130		
60 m	HB	Chris Huffins	6.61 s	1026	−104	
Long jump
Long jump	WR	Carl Lewis	8.79 m	1268		
Long jump	HB	Simon Ehammer	8.26 m	1128	−140	
Shot put
Shot put	WR	Ryan Crouser	22.82 m	1276		
Shot put	HB	Aleksey Drozdov	17.17 m	924	−352	
High jump
High jump	WR	Javier Sotomayor	2.43 m	1223		
High jump	HB	Derek Drouin	2.30 m	1091	−132	
60 m hurdles
60 m hurdles	WR	Grant Holloway	7.27 s	1174		
60 m hurdles	HB	Simon Ehammer	7.52 s	1106	−68	
Pole vault
Pole vault	WR	Armand Duplantis	6.31 m	1335		
Pole vault	HB	Alex Averbukh	5.60 m	1100	−235	
1000 m
1000 m	WR	Ayanleh Souleiman	2:14.20 min:s	1182		
1000 m	HB	Curtis Beach	2:23.63 min:s	1064	−118	
Total	World record			8588		
Total	Heptathlon bests			7418	−1170	

== Area records ==
- Updated 20 May 2026.

Women's heptathlon
Area	Score	Season	Athlete
World	7291	1988	Jackie Joyner-Kersee (USA)
Area records
Africa (records)	6423	2005	Margaret Simpson (GHA)
Asia (records)	6942	1996	Ghada Shouaa (SYR)
Europe (records)	7032	2007	Carolina Klüft (SWE)
North, Central America and Caribbean (records)	7291	1988	Jackie Joyner-Kersee (USA)
Oceania (records)	6695	1990	Jane Flemming (AUS)
South America (records)	6475	2025	Martha Araújo (COL)

Men's indoor heptathlon
Area	Score	Season	Athlete
World	6670	2026	Simon Ehammer (SUI)
Area records
Africa (records)	5911	2010	Larbi Bourrada (ALG)
Asia (records)	6229	2008	Dmitriy Karpov (KAZ)
Europe (records)	6670	2026	Simon Ehammer (SUI)
North, Central America and Caribbean (records)	6645	2012	Ashton Eaton (USA)
Oceania (records)	6344	2022	Ashley Moloney (AUS)
South America (records)	6010	2025	José Fernando Ferreira (BRA)

== All-time top 25 ==
=== Women ===
- As of July 2026

Rank	Score	Athlete	Date	Place	Ref.
1	7291	Jackie Joyner-Kersee (USA)	23–24 September 1988	Seoul	
1	( 12.69/+0.8 - 1.86 - 15.80 - 22.56/+1.6 / 7.27/+0.7 - 45.66 - 2:08.51 )				
2	7032	Carolina Klüft (SWE)	25–26 August 2007	Osaka	
2	( 13.15/+0.1 - 1.95 - 14.81 - 23.38/+0.3 / 6.85/+1.0 - 47.98 - 2:12.56 )				
2	7032	Anna Hall (USA)	31 May – 1 June 2025	Götzis	
2	( 13.19/-1.0 - 1.95 - 14.86 - 23.37/+0.5 / 6.44/-0.1 - 46.16 - 2:01.23 )				
4	7013	Nafissatou Thiam (BEL)	27–28 May 2017	Götzis	
4	( 13.34/-0.7 - 1.98 - 14.51 - 24.40/-1.6 / 6.56/+0.8 - 59.32 - 2:15.24 )				
5	7007	Larisa Nikitina (URS)	10–11 June 1989	Bryansk	
5	( 13.40/+1.4 - 1.89 - 16.45 - 23.97/+1.1 / 6.73/+4.0 - 53.94 - 2:15.31 )				
6	6985	Sabine Braun (GER)	30–31 May 1992	Götzis	
6	( 13.11/-0.4 - 1.93 - 14.84 - 23.65/+2.0 / 6.63/+2.9 - 51.62 - 2:12.67 )				
7	6981	Katarina Johnson-Thompson (GBR)	2–4 October 2019	Doha	
7	( 13.09/+0.6 - 1.95 - 13.86 - 23.08/+1.0 / 6.77/+0.2 - 43.93 - 2:07.26 )				
8	6955	Jessica Ennis (GBR)	3–4 August 2012	London	
8	( 12.54/+1.3 - 1.86 - 14.28 - 22.83/-0.3 / 6.48/-0.6 - 47.49 - 2:08.65 )				
9	6946	Sabine Paetz (GDR)	5–6 May 1984	Potsdam	
9	( 12.64/+0.3 - 1.80 - 15.37 - 23.37/+0.7 / 6.86/-0.2 - 44.62 - 2:08.93 )				
10	6942	Ghada Shouaa (SYR)	25–26 May 1996	Götzis	
10	( 13.78/+0.3 - 1.87 - 15.64 - 23.78/+0.6 / 6.77/+0.6 - 54.74 - 2:13.61 )				
11	6935	Ramona Neubert (GDR)	18–19 June 1983	Moscow	
11	( 13.42/+1.8 - 1.82 - 15.25 - 23.49/+0.5 / 6.79/+0.7 - 49.94 - 2:07.51 )				
12	6889	Eunice Barber (FRA)	4–5 June 2005	Arles	
12	( 12.62/+2.9 - 1.91 - 12.61 - 24.12/+1.2 / 6.78/+3.4 - 53.07 - 2:14.66 )				
13	6867	Anouk Vetter (NED)	17–18 July 2022	Eugene	
13	( 13.30/+0.7 - 1.80 - 16.25 - 23.73/+1.4 / 6.52/+0.3 - 58.29 - 2:20.09 )				
14	6859	Natalya Shubenkova (URS)	20–21 June 1984	Kyiv	
14	( 12.93/+1.0 - 1.83 - 13.66 - 23.57/-0.3 / 6.73/+0.4 - 46.26 - 2:04.60 )				
15	6858	Anke Behmer (GDR)	23–24 September 1988	Seoul	
15	( 13.20/+0.8 - 1.83 - 14.20 - 23.10/+1.6 / 6.68/ - 44.54 - 2:04.20 )				
16	6845	Irina Belova (RUS)	1–2 August 1992	Barcelona	
16	( 13.25/-0.1 - 1.88 - 13.77 - 23.34/+0.2 / 6.82/ - 41.90 - 2:05.08 )				
17	6836	Carolin Schäfer (GER)	27–28 May 2017	Götzis	
17	( 13.09/+1.0 - 1.86 - 14.76 - 23.36/+0.7 / 6.57/+0.9 - 49.80 - 2:14.73 )				
18	6832	Lyudmila Blonska (UKR)	25–26 August 2007	Osaka	
18	( 13.25/+0.1 - 1.92 - 14.44 - 24.09/+0.3 / 6.88/+1.0 - 47.77 - 2:16.68 )				
19	6831	Denise Lewis (GBR)	29–30 July 2000	Götzis	
19	( 13.13/+1.0 - 1.84 - 15.07 - 24.01/+3.6 / 6.69/-0.4 - 49.42 - 2:12.20 )				
20	6819	Annik Kälin (SUI)	27–28 June 2026	Ratingen	
20	( 12.60/+0.4 - 1.75 - 14.00 - 23.00/+0.2 / 6.75/-1.1 - 47.85 - 2:11.93 )				
21	6815	Laura Ikauniece-Admidiņa (LAT)	27–28 May 2017	Götzis	
21	( 13.10/+1.0 - 1.77 - 13.53 - 23.49/-2.9 / 6.64/+0.8 - 56.17 - 2:11.76 )				
22	6808	Brianne Theisen-Eaton (CAN)	30–31 May 2015	Götzis	
22	( 13.05/-0.2 - 1.89 - 13.73 - 23.34/+1.4 / 6.72/+0.9 - 42.96 - 2:09.37 )				
23	6803	Jane Frederick (USA)	15–16 September 1984	Talence	
23	( 13.27/+1.2 - 1.87 - 15.49 - 24.15/+1.6 / 6.43/+0.2 - 51.74 - 2:13.55 )				
24	6778	Nataliya Dobrynska (UKR)	30–31 July 2010	Barcelona	
24	( 13.59/-1.6 - 1.86 - 15.88 - 24.23/-0.2 / 6.56/+0.3 - 49.25 - 2:12.06 )				
25	6765	Yelena Prokhorova (RUS)	22–23 July 2000	Tula	
25	( 13.54/-2.8 - 1.82 - 14.30 - 23.37/-0.2 / 6.72/+1.0 - 43.40 - 2:04.27 )				

==== Notes ====
Below is a list of all other scores equal or superior to 6875 pts:

- Jackie Joyner-Kersee also scored 7215 (1988), 7158 (1986), 7148 (1986), 7128 (1987), 7044 (1992), 6979 (1987), 6910 (1986) and 6878 (1991).
- Carolina Klüft also scored 7001 (2003), 6952 (2004) and 6887 (2005).
- Anna Hall also scored 6899 (2025), 6988 (2023) and 6888 (2025).
- Nafissatou Thiam also scored 6947 (2022) and 6880 (2024).
- Jessica Ennis also scored 6906 (2012).
- Sabine Paetz also scored 6897 (1988).
- Larisa Nikitina also scored 6875 (1989).

==== Annulled marks ====
- Tatyana Chernova scored 6880 (2011), this performance was annulled due to doping offences.

=== Men ===
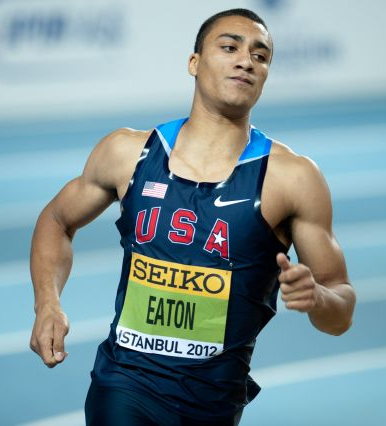
Former world record holder Ashton Eaton competing at the 2012 IAAF World Indoor Championships

- As of March 2026

Rank	Score	Athlete	Date	Place	Ref.
1	6670	Simon Ehammer (SUI)	20–21 March 2026	Toruń	
2	6645	Ashton Eaton (USA)	9–10 March 2012	Istanbul	
3	6639 A	Kyle Garland (USA)	10–11 March 2023	Albuquerque	
4	6558	Sander Skotheim (NOR)	7–8 March 2025	Apeldoorn	
5	6518 A	Ayden Owens-Delerme (PUR)	10–11 March 2023	Albuquerque	
6	6503	Peyton Bair (USA)	13–14 March 2026	Fayetteville	
7	6489	Damian Warner (CAN)	18–19 March 2022	Belgrade	
8	6479	Kevin Mayer (FRA)	4–5 March 2017	Belgrade	
9	6476	Dan O'Brien (USA)	13–14 March 1993	Toronto	
10	6438	Roman Šebrle (CZE)	6–7 March 2004	Budapest	
11	6437	Johannes Erm (EST)	22-23 March 2025	Nanjing	
12	6424	Tomáš Dvořák (CZE)	25–26 February 2000	Ghent	
13	6418	Christian Plaziat (FRA)	28–29 February 1992	Genoa	
14	6415	Sebastian Chmara (POL)	28 February – 1 March 1998	Valencia	
15	6412	Lev Lobodin (RUS)	7–8 February 2003	Moscow	
16	6388	Till Steinforth (GER)	7–8 March 2025	Apeldoorn	
17	6382	Garrett Scantling (USA)	26–27 February 2022	Spokane	
18	6374	Erki Nool (EST)	6–7 March 1999	Maebashi	
19	6372	Eelco Sintnicolaas (NED)	2–3 March 2013	Gothenburg	
20	6371	Bryan Clay (USA)	8–9 March 2008	Valencia	
21	6362	Mikk Pahapill (EST)	7–8 March 2009	Turin	
22	6361	Tom Pappas (USA)	15–16 March 2003	Birmingham	
23	6353	Ilya Shkurenev (RUS)	7–8 March 2015	Prague	
24	6347	Leo Neugebauer (GER)	8–9 March 2024	Boston	
25	6344	Ashley Moloney (AUS)	18–19 March 2022	Belgrade	

==== Notes ====
Below is a list of all other scores equal or superior to 6344 pts:

- Ashton Eaton also scored 6632 (2014), 6568 (2011), 6499 (2010) and 6470 (2016).
- Sander Skotheim also scored 6484 (2025), 6475 (2025) and 6407 (2024).
- Roman Šebrle also scored 6420 (2001), 6358 (2000) and 6350 (2004).
- Simon Ehammer also scored 6506 (2025), 6418 (2024), 6416 (2026) and 6363 (2022).
- Kyle Garland also scored 6415 (2023).
- Kevin Mayer also scored 6392 (2021) and 6348 (2018, 2023).
- Sebastian Chmara also scored 6386 (1999).
- Johannes Erm also scored 6380 (2025).
- Peyton Bair also scored 6371 (2026).
- Bryan Clay also scored 6365 (2004).

== Medalists ==
=== Women's Olympic medalists ===
Games	Gold	Silver	Bronze
1984 Los Angeles	Glynis Nunn; Australia	Jackie Joyner; United States	Sabine Everts; West Germany
1988 Seoul	Jackie Joyner-Kersee; United States	Sabine John; East Germany	Anke Behmer; East Germany
1992 Barcelona	Jackie Joyner-Kersee; United States	Irina Belova; Unified Team	Sabine Braun; Germany
1996 Atlanta	Ghada Shouaa; Syria	Natallia Sazanovich; Belarus	Denise Lewis; Great Britain
2000 Sydney	Denise Lewis; Great Britain	Yelena Prokhorova; Russia	Natallia Sazanovich; Belarus
2004 Athens	Carolina Klüft; Sweden	Austra Skujytė; Lithuania	Kelly Sotherton; Great Britain
2008 Beijing	Nataliya Dobrynska; Ukraine	Hyleas Fountain; United States	Kelly Sotherton; Great Britain
2012 London	Jessica Ennis; Great Britain	Lilli Schwarzkopf; Germany	Austra Skujytė; Lithuania
2016 Rio de Janeiro	Nafissatou Thiam; Belgium	Jessica Ennis-Hill; Great Britain	Brianne Theisen-Eaton; Canada
2020 Tokyo	Nafissatou Thiam; Belgium	Anouk Vetter; Netherlands	Emma Oosterwegel; Netherlands
2024 Paris	Nafissatou Thiam; Belgium	Katarina Johnson-Thompson; Great Britain	Noor Vidts; Belgium
2028 Los Angeles			

=== Women's World Championships medalists ===
Championships	Gold	Silver	Bronze
1983 Helsinki	Ramona Gohler-Neubert (GDR)	Sabine Mobius-Paetz (GDR)	Anke Vater (GDR)
1987 Rome	Jackie Joyner-Kersee (USA)	Larisa Nikitina (URS)	Jane Frederick (USA)
1991 Tokyo	Sabine Braun (GER)	Liliana Năstase (ROU)	Irina Belova (URS)
1993 Stuttgart	Jackie Joyner-Kersee (USA)	Sabine Braun (GER)	Svetlana Buraga (BLR)
1995 Gothenburg	Ghada Shouaa (SYR)	Svetlana Moskalets (RUS)	Rita Ináncsi (HUN)
1997 Athens	Sabine Braun (GER)	Denise Lewis (GBR)	Remigija Nazarovienė (LTU)
1999 Seville	Eunice Barber (FRA)	Denise Lewis (GBR)	Ghada Shouaa (SYR)
2001 Edmonton	Yelena Prokhorova (RUS)	Natallia Sazanovich (BLR)	Shelia Burrell (USA)
2003 Saint-Denis	Carolina Klüft (SWE)	Eunice Barber (FRA)	Natallia Sazanovich (BLR)
2005 Helsinki	Carolina Klüft (SWE)	Eunice Barber (FRA)	Margaret Simpson (GHA)
2007 Osaka	Carolina Klüft (SWE)	Lyudmyla Blonska (UKR)	Kelly Sotherton (GBR)
2009 Berlin	Jessica Ennis (GBR)	Jennifer Oeser (GER)	Kamila Chudzik (POL)
2011 Daegu	Jessica Ennis (GBR)	Jennifer Oeser (GER)	Karolina Tymińska (POL)
2013 Moscow	Hanna Melnychenko (UKR)	Brianne Theisen-Eaton (CAN)	Dafne Schippers (NED)
2015 Beijing	Jessica Ennis-Hill (GBR)	Brianne Theisen-Eaton (CAN)	Laura Ikauniece-Admidiņa (LAT)
2017 London	Nafissatou Thiam (BEL)	Carolin Schäfer (GER)	Anouk Vetter (NED)
2019 Doha	Katarina Johnson-Thompson (GBR)	Nafissatou Thiam (BEL)	Verena Preiner (AUT)
2022 Eugene	Nafissatou Thiam (BEL)	Anouk Vetter (NED)	Anna Hall (USA)
2023 Budapest	Katarina Johnson-Thompson (GBR)	Anna Hall (USA)	Anouk Vetter (NED)
2025 Tokyo	Anna Hall (USA)	Kate O'Connor (IRL)	Taliyah Brooks (USA) Katarina Johnson-Thompson (GBR)

==== Medal table ====
Rank	Nation	Gold	Silver	Bronze	Total
1	Great Britain (GBR)	5	2	2	9
2	United States (USA)	3	1	4	8
3	Sweden (SWE)	3	0	0	3
4	Germany (GER)	2	4	0	6
5	Belgium (BEL)	2	1	0	3
6	France (FRA)	1	2	0	3
7	East Germany (GDR)	1	1	1	3
8	Russia (RUS)	1	1	0	2
8	Ukraine (UKR)	1	1	0	2
10	Syria (SYR)	1	0	1	2
11	Canada (CAN)	0	2	0	2
12	Netherlands (NED)	0	1	3	4
13	Belarus (BLR)	0	1	2	3
14	Soviet Union (URS)	0	1	1	2
15	Ireland (IRL)	0	1	0	1
15	Romania (ROU)	0	1	0	1
17	Poland (POL)	0	0	2	2
18	Austria (AUT)	0	0	1	1
18	Ghana (GHA)	0	0	1	1
18	Hungary (HUN)	0	0	1	1
18	Latvia (LAT)	0	0	1	1
18	Lithuania (LTU)	0	0	1	1
Totals (22 entries)		20	20	21	61

=== Men's World Indoor Championships medalists ===
Games	Gold	Silver	Bronze
1995 Barcelona	Christian Plaziat (FRA)	Tomáš Dvořák (CZE)	Henrik Dagård (SWE)
1997 Paris	Robert Změlík (CZE)	Erki Nool (EST)	Jón Magnússon (ISL)
1999 Maebashi	Sebastian Chmara (POL)	Erki Nool (EST)	Roman Šebrle (CZE)
2001 Lisbon	Roman Šebrle (CZE)	Jón Magnússon (ISL)	Lev Lobodin (RUS)
2003 Birmingham	Tom Pappas (USA)	Lev Lobodin (RUS)	Roman Šebrle (CZE)
2004 Budapest	Roman Šebrle (CZE)	Bryan Clay (USA)	Lev Lobodin (RUS)
2006 Moscow	André Niklaus (GER)	Bryan Clay (USA)	Roman Šebrle (CZE)
2008 Valencia	Bryan Clay (USA)	Andrei Krauchanka (BLR)	Dmitriy Karpov (KAZ)
2010 Doha	Bryan Clay (USA)	Trey Hardee (USA)	Aleksey Drozdov (RUS)
2012 Istanbul	Ashton Eaton (USA)	Oleksiy Kasyanov (UKR)	Artem Lukyanenko (RUS)
2014 Sopot	Ashton Eaton (USA)	Andrei Krauchanka (BLR)	Thomas van der Plaetsen (BEL)
2016 Portland	Ashton Eaton (USA)	Oleksiy Kasyanov (UKR)	Mathias Brugger (GER)
2018 Birmingham	Kevin Mayer (FRA)	Damian Warner (CAN)	Maicel Uibo (EST)
2022 Belgrade	Damian Warner (CAN)	Simon Ehammer (SUI)	Ashley Moloney (AUS)
2024 Glasgow	Simon Ehammer (SUI)	Sander Skotheim (NOR)	Johannes Erm (EST)
2025 Nanjing	Sander Skotheim (NOR)	Johannes Erm (EST)	Till Steinforth (GER)
2026 Toruń	Simon Ehammer (SUI)	Heath Baldwin (USA)	Kyle Garland (USA)

== World leading scores ==
=== Women's heptathlon ===
Year	Score	Athlete	Place
1980	6049	Zoya Spasovkhodskaya (URS)	Pyatigorsk
1981	6788	Ramona Neubert (GDR)	Kyiv
1982	6845	Ramona Neubert (GDR)	Halle
1983	6935	Ramona Neubert (GDR)	Moscow
1984	6946	Sabine Paetz (GDR)	Potsdam
1985	6718	Jackie Joyner (USA)	Baton Rouge
1986	7158	Jackie Joyner-Kersee (USA)	Houston
1987	7128	Jackie Joyner-Kersee (USA)	Rome
1988	7291	Jackie Joyner-Kersee (USA)	Seoul
1989	7007	Larisa Nikitina (URS)	Bryansk
1990	6783	Jackie Joyner-Kersee (USA)	Seattle
1991	6878	Jackie Joyner-Kersee (USA)	New York City
1992	7044	Jackie Joyner-Kersee (USA)	Barcelona
1993	6837	Jackie Joyner-Kersee (USA)	Stuttgart
1994	6741	Heike Drechsler (GER)	Talence
1995	6715	Ghada Shouaa (SYR)	Götzis
1996	6942	Ghada Shouaa (SYR)	Götzis
1997	6787	Sabine Braun (GER)	Ratingen
1998	6559	Denise Lewis (GBR)	Budapest
1999	6861	Eunice Barber (FRA)	Seville
2000	6842	Eunice Barber (FRA)	Götzis
2001	6736	Eunice Barber (FRA)	Götzis
2002	6542	Carolina Klüft (SWE)	Munich
2003	7001	Carolina Klüft (SWE)	Saint-Denis
2004	6952	Carolina Klüft (SWE)	Athens
2005	6889	Eunice Barber (FRA)	Arles
2006	6740	Carolina Klüft (SWE)	Gothenburg
2007	7032	Carolina Klüft (SWE)	Osaka
2008	6733	Nataliya Dobrynska (UKR)	Beijing
2009	6731	Jessica Ennis (GBR)	Berlin
2010	6823	Jessica Ennis (GBR)	Barcelona
2011	6790	Jessica Ennis (GBR)	Götzis
2012	6955	Jessica Ennis (GBR)	London
2013	6623	Tatyana Chernova (RUS)	Kazan
2014	6682	Katarina Johnson-Thompson (GBR)	Götzis
2015	6808	Brianne Theisen-Eaton (CAN)	Götzis
2016	6810	Nafissatou Thiam (BEL)	Rio de Janeiro
2017	7013	Nafissatou Thiam (BEL)	Götzis
2018	6816	Nafissatou Thiam (BEL)	Berlin
2019	6981	Katarina Johnson-Thompson (GBR)	Doha
2020	6419	Ivona Dadic (AUT)	Götzis
2021	6791	Nafissatou Thiam (BEL)	Tokyo
2022	6947	Nafissatou Thiam (BEL)	Eugene
2023	6988	Anna Hall (USA)	Götzis
2024	6880	Nafissatou Thiam (BEL)	Saint-Denis
2025	7032	Anna Hall (USA)	Götzis
2026	6819	Annik Kälin (SUI)	Ratingen

=== Men's indoor heptathlon ===
Year	Score	Athlete	Place
1999	6386	Sebastian Chmara (POL)	Maebashi
2000	6424	Tomáš Dvořák (CZE)	Ghent
2001	6420	Roman Šebrle (CZE)	Lisbon
2002	6291	Frank Busemann (GER)	Tallinn
2003	6412	Lev Lobodin (RUS)	Moscow
2004	6438	Roman Šebrle (CZE)	Budapest
2005	6232	Roman Šebrle (CZE)	Madrid
2006	6229	Aleksandr Pogorelov (RUS)	Moscow
2007	6196	Roman Šebrle (CZE)	Birmingham
2008	6371	Bryan Clay (USA)	Valencia
2009	6362	Mikk Pahapill (EST)	Turin
2010	6499	Ashton Eaton (USA)	Fayetteville
2011	6568	Ashton Eaton (USA)	Tallinn
2012	6645	Ashton Eaton (USA)	Istanbul
2013	6372	Eelco Sintnicolaas (NED)	Gothenburg
2014	6632	Ashton Eaton (USA)	Sopot
2015	6353	Ilya Shkurenyov (RUS)	Prague
2016	6470	Ashton Eaton (USA)	Portland
2017	6479	Kevin Mayer (FRA)	Belgrade
2018	6348	Kevin Mayer (FRA)	Birmingham
2019	6218	Jorge Ureña (SPA)	Glasgow
2020	6320	Artyom Makarenko (RUS)	Kirov
2021	6392	Kevin Mayer (FRA)	Toruń
2022	6489	Damian Warner (CAN)	Belgrade
2023	6639 A	Kyle Garland (USA)	Albuquerque
2024	6418	Simon Ehammer (SUI)	Glasgow
2025	6558	Sander Skotheim (NOR)	Apeldoorn
2026	6670	Simon Ehammer (SUI)	Toruń

== National records ==
=== Women's heptathlon ===
Updated September 2026.

Equal or superior to 6100 pts:

Score	Country	Athlete	Date	Place	Ref.
7291	United States	Jackie Joyner-Kersee	23–24 September 1988	Seoul	
7032	Sweden	Carolina Klüft	25–26 August 2007	Osaka	
7013	Belgium	Nafissatou Thiam	27–28 May 2017	Götzis	
7007	Russia	Larisa Nikitina	10–11 June 1989	Bryansk	
6985	Germany	Sabine Braun	30–31 May 1992	Götzis	
6981	Great Britain	Katarina Johnson-Thompson	2–4 October 2019	Doha	
6942	Syria	Ghada Shouaa	25–26 May 1996	Götzis	
6889	France	Eunice Barber	4–5 June 2005	Arles	
6867	Netherlands	Anouk Vetter	17–18 July 2022	Eugene	
6832	Ukraine	Lyudmyla Blonska	25–26 August 2007	Osaka	
6819	Switzerland	Annik Kälin	27–28 June 2026	Ratingen	
6815	Latvia	Laura Ikauniece-Admidiņa	27–28 May 2017	Götzis	
6808	Canada	Brianne Theisen-Eaton	30–31 May 2015	Götzis	
6750	China	Ma Miaolan	11–12 September 1993	Beijing	
6742	Cuba	Yorgelis Rodríguez	26–27 May 2018	Götzis	
6714	Ireland	Kate O'Connor	19–20 September 2025	Tokyo	
6695	Australia	Jane Flemming	27–28 January 1990	Auckland	
6672	Poland	Adrianna Sułek	17–18 July 2022	Eugene	
6658	Bulgaria	Svetla Dimitrova	30–31 May 1992	Götzis	
6651	Hungary	Xénia Krizsán	29–30 May 2021	Götzis	
6635	Belarus	Svetlana Buraga	17–18 August 1993	Stuttgart	
6619	Romania	Liliana Nastase	1–2 August 1992	Barcelona	
6604	Lithuania	Remigija Nazaroviene	10–11 June 1989	Bryansk	
6591	Austria	Verena Preiner	29–30 June 2019	Ratingen	
6563	Finland	Saga Vanninen	19–20 July 2025	Bergen	
6527	Jamaica	Diane Guthrie-Gresham	2–3 June 1995	Knoxville	
6475	Colombia	Martha Araújo	31 May – 1 June 2025	Götzis	
6462	Sierra Leone	Eunice Barber	29–30 May 1999	Arles	
6460	Czech Republic	Eliška Klučinová	14–15 June 2014	Kladno	
6423	Moldova	Lyubov Ratsu	27–28 August 1983	Chişinău	
6423	Ghana	Margaret Simpson	28–29 May 2005	Götzis	
6418	Trinidad and Tobago	Tyra Gittens	13–14 May 2021	College Station	
6413	Italy	Sveva Gerevini	30–31 May 2026	Götzis	
6392	Algeria	Yasmina Azzizi	26–27 August 1991	Tokyo	
6372	Spain	María Vicente	14–15 August 2026	Birmingham	
6371	Barbados	Akela Jones	10–11 June 2015	Eugene	
6349	Uzbekistan	Yekaterina Voronina	28–29 May 2021	Tashkent	
6311	Portugal	Jéssica Barreira	22–23 June 2026	Lisbon	
6293	Croatia	Jana Koščak	27–28 May 2023	Götzis	
6293	Croatia	Jana Koščak	9–10 August 2025	Tampere	
6285	Estonia	Pippi Lotta Enok	13–14 June 2025	Eugene	
6278	New Zealand	Joanne Henry	28 February – 1 March 1992	Auckland	
6274	Benin	Odile Ahouanwanou	19–20 June 2021	Ratingen	
6272	Kazakhstan	Yelena Davydova	13–14 July 1987	Zagreb	
6250	Burkina Faso	Marthe Koala	29–30 May 2021	Götzis	
6235	Greece	Aryiro Strataki	27–28 May 2006	Götzis	
6226	Norway	Ida Marcussen	25–26 August 2007	Osaka	
6211	India	Javur Jagadeeshappa Shobha	16–17 March 2004	New Delhi	
6136	Puerto Rico	Alysbeth Felix	5–6 August 2026	Santo Domingo	

=== Men's indoor heptathlon ===
Updated March 2026.

Equal or superior to 6000 pts:

Score	Country	Athlete	Date	Place	Ref.
6670	Switzerland	Simon Ehammer	21–22 March 2026	Toruń	
6645	United States	Ashton Eaton	9–10 March 2012	Istanbul	
6558	Norway	Sander Skotheim	7–8 March 2025	Apeldoorn	
6518 A	Puerto Rico	Ayden Owens-Delerme	10–11 March 2023	Albuquerque	
6489	Canada	Damian Warner	18–19 March 2022	Belgrade	
6479	France	Kevin Mayer	4–5 March 2017	Belgrade	
6438	Czech Republic	Roman Šebrle	6–7 March 2004	Budapest	
6437	Estonia	Johannes Erm	22–23 March 2025	Nanjing	
6415	Poland	Sebastian Chmara	28 February – 1 March 1998	Valencia	
6412	Russia	Lev Lobodin	7–8 February 2003	Moscow	
6388	Germany	Till Steinforth	7–8 March 2025	Apeldoorn	
6372	Netherlands	Eelco Sintnicolaas	2–3 March 2013	Gothenburg	
6344	Australia	Ashley Moloney	18–19 March 2022	Belgrade	
6340	Bahamas	Ken Mullings	26–27 January 2024	Champaign	
6303	Belarus	Andrei Krauchanka	7–8 March 2014	Sopot	
6293	Iceland	Jón Arnar Magnússon	6–7 March 1999	Maebashi	
6259	Belgium	Thomas van der Plaetsen	7–8 March 2014	Sopot	
6259	Belgium	Jente Hauttekeete	7–8 March 2025	Apeldoorn	
6254	Ukraine	Oleksiy Kasyanov	30–31 January 2010	Zaporizhzhia	
6249	Hungary	Dezső Szabó	28 February – 1 March 1998	Valencia	
6249	Spain	Jorge Ureña	28–29 January 2017	Prague	
6229	Kazakhstan	Dmitriy Karpov	15–16 February 2008	Tallinn	
6188	Great Britain	Timothy Duckworth	9–10 March 2018	College Station	
6142	Sweden	Henrik Dagård	11–12 March 1995	Barcelona	
6121	Italy	Dario Dester	28 February – 1 March 2026	Ancona	
6099	Serbia	Mihail Dudaš	2–3 March 2013	Gothenburg	
6065	Austria	Roland Schwarzl	20–21 February 2010	Vienna	
6036	Montenegro	Darko Pešić	6–7 February 2021	Belgrade	
6035	Jamaica	Maurice Smith	25–26 February 2005	Fayetteville	
6032	Greece	Prodromos Korkizoglou	11–12 February 2000	Piraeus	
6029	Grenada	Lindon Victor	18–19 March 2022	Belgrade	
6010	Brazil	José Fernando Ferreira	22–23 March 2025	Nanjing	

== Men's heptathlon under-20 records ==
Key:
Unratified by World Athletics

✕ = Inadequate doping control

Event	Record	N	Athlete	Nation	Date	Meet	Place	Age	Ref.
Heptathlon (Senior implements)	6022	✕	Gunnar Nixon	United States	27–28 January 2012	Razorback Invitational	Fayetteville	19 years, 15 days	
Heptathlon (Senior implements)	( 7.10 - 7.53 - 13.97 - 2.15 / 8.21 - 4.50 - 2:40.15 )								
Heptathlon (U20 implements)	6062		Jente Hauttekeete	Belgium	13–14 February 2021	Mehrkampf - Siebenkampf U20	Frankfurt	18 years, 337 days	
Heptathlon (U20 implements)	( 7.07 - 7.33 - 15.64 - 2.10 / 8.06 - 4.70 - 2:46.71 )								

=== Men's heptathlon under-20 bests ===
(In completed heptathlons of more than 5200 points)

Event	Specification	Result	Score	Athlete	Nation	Date	Meet	Place	Age	Ref.
60 m		6.75	973	Ayden Owens	Puerto Rico	8 March 2019	NCAA Division 1 Indoor Championships	Birmingham	18 years, 284 days	
Long jump		7.96 m	1050	Eusebio Cáceres	Spain	6 March 2010	Spanish Junior Indoor Championships	San Sebastián	18 years, 177 days	
Shot put	6 kg	16.51 m	883	Simon Pettersson	Sweden	10 March 2012	Swedish Indoor Junior Combined Events Championships	Gothenburg	18 years, 67 days	
Shot put	7.26 kg	15.06 m	793	Matas Adamonis	Lithuania	14 December 2017		Šiauliai	19 years, 171 days	
High jump		2.19 m	982	Yaroslav Rybakov	Russia	13 February 1999	Russian U20 Indoor Combined Events Championships	Chelyabinsk	18 years, 83 days	
High jump		2.19 m	982	Andrei Krauchanka	Belarus	5 February 2005	Reval Hotels Cup	Tallinn	19 years, 32 days	
First-day score	U20 implements		3476	Jente Hauttekeete	Belgium	13 February 2021	Mehrkampf - Siebenkampf U20	Frankfurt	18 years, 336 days	
First-day score	Senior implements		3466	Andrei Krauchanka	Belarus	5 February 2005	Reval Hotels Cup	Tallinn	19 years, 32 days	
60 m hurdles	0.991 m	7.68	1064	Maxime Moitie‑Charnois	France	12 February 2023	French U20 Indoor Combined Events Championships	Val-de-Reuil	18 years, 303 days	
60 m hurdles	1.067 m	7.84	1022	Ayden Owens	Puerto Rico	9 March 2019	NCAA Division 1 Indoor Championships	Birmingham	18 years, 285 days	
Pole vault		5.55 m	1083	Oleksandr Korchmid	Ukraine	20 December 2001	Ukraine Junior ME	Brovary	19 years, 332 days	
1000 m		2:30.67	980	Lukáš Souček	Czech Republic	5 March 1994		Prague	18 years, 238 days	
Second-day score	U20 implements		2713	Maxime Moitie-Charnois	France	12 February 2023	French U20 Indoor Combined Events Championships	Val-de-Reuil	18 years, 303 days	
Second-day score	Senior implements		2663	André Niklaus	Germany	6 February 2000	Frankfurt-Kalbach Int. ME Meeting	Frankfurt-Kalbach	18 years, 160 days	

== See also ==
- Men's heptathlon world record progression
- Women's heptathlon world record progression
- Combined events at the Olympics

Other multiple event contests include:

Summer sports

- Biathle
- Duathlon
- Triathlon
- Quadrathlon
- Pentathlon (athletics)
- Pentathlon
- Modern pentathlon
- Hexathlon (primarily a youth or junior event)
- Octathlon (primarily a youth or junior event although logistical problems have seen senior octathlons contested, for example at the 2007 South Pacific Games)
- Decathlon

Winter sports

- Biathlon
- Nordic combined

Other

- Chess-boxing
