= Puerto Rico at the World Athletics Championships =

- Flag of Puerto Rico
- WA code: PUR
- Medals: Gold 0 Silver 4 Bronze 1 Total 5

World Athletics Championships appearances (overview)
- 1983; 1987; 1991; 1993; 1995; 1997; 1999; 2001; 2003; 2005; 2007; 2009; 2011; 2013; 2015; 2017; 2019; 2022; 2023; 2025

Puerto Rico has competed in all editions of the World Athletics Championships since 1983. Its athletes have achieved 5 medals, with 4 silvers and 1 bronze. Its first medalist was Javier Culson in the men's 400 hurdles event in 2009. Its first female medalist was Jasmine Camacho-Quinn in the women's 100 hurdles event in 2022.

== Medalists ==
Medal	Name	Year	Event
Silver	Javier Culson	2009 Daegu	Men's 400 metres hurdles
Silver	Javier Culson	2011 Daegu	Men's 400 metres hurdles
Bronze	Jasmine Camacho-Quinn	2022 Eugene	Women's metres 100 hurdles
Silver	Jasmine Camacho-Quinn	2023 Budapest	Women's metres 100 hurdles
Silver	Ayden Owens-Delerme	2025 Tokyo	Men's Decathlon

=== By event ===
Event	Gold	Silver	Bronze	Total
400 metres hurdles	0	2	0	2
100 metres hurdles	0	1	1	2
Decathlon	0	1	0	1
Totals (3 entries)	0	4	1	5

=== By gender ===
Gender	Gold	Silver	Bronze	Total
Men	0	3	0	3
Women	0	1	1	2

== See also ==
- Puerto Rico at the Olympics
- Puerto Rico at the Paralympics
