= Germany at the 2025 World Athletics Championships =

- Flag of Germany
- WA code: GER

in Tokyo, Japan 13–21 September 2025
- Competitors: 80 (42 men and 38 women)
- Medals Ranked 12th: Gold 1 Silver 3 Bronze 1 Total 5

World Athletics Championships appearances (overview)
- 1991; 1993; 1995; 1997; 1999; 2001; 2003; 2005; 2007; 2009; 2011; 2013; 2015; 2017; 2019; 2022; 2023; 2025

Germany competed at the 2025 World Athletics Championships in Tokyo, Japan, from 13 to 21 September 2025.

== Medalists ==
Medal	Athlete	Event	Date
1st place, gold medalist(s)	Leo Neugebauer	Men's decathlon	21 September
2nd place, silver medalist(s)	Malaika Mihambo	Women's long jump	14 September
2nd place, silver medalist(s)	Amanal Petros	Men's marathon	15 September
2nd place, silver medalist(s)	Merlin Hummel	Men's hammer throw	16 September
3rd place, bronze medalist(s)	Sina Mayer; Rebekka Haase; Sophia Junk; Gina Lückenkemper	Women's 4 × 100 metres relay	21 September

== Results ==
Germany entered 80 athletes.

Key

- Q = Qualified for the next round
- q = Qualified for the next round as a fastest loser or, in field events, by position without achieving the qualifying target
- NR = National record
- PB = Personal best
- SB = Season best
- N/A = Round not applicable for the event

=== Men ===
Track and road events

Athlete	Event	Heat		Semifinal		Final	
Athlete	Event	Result	Rank	Result	Rank	Result	Rank
Owen Ansah	100 metres	10.21	6	Did not advance			28
Lucas Ansah-Peprah	100 metres	10.25	5	Did not advance			37
Jean Paul Bredau	400 metres	46.05	6	Did not advance			43
Alexander Stepanov	800 metres	1:46.32	7	Did not advance			42
Robert Farken	1500 metres	3:42.06	2 Q	3:37.52	9 qR	3:35.15	6
Mohamed Abdilaahi	5000 metres	13:44.68	11	—N/a		Did not advance	29
Florian Bremm	5000 metres	13:31.09	16	—N/a		Did not advance	24
Aaron Bienenfeld	10,000 metres	—N/a				29:51.41	23
Amanal Petros	Marathon	—N/a				2:09:48	2nd place, silver medalist(s)
Richard Ringer	Marathon	—N/a				2:11:14	13
Karl Bebendorf	3000 metres steeplechase	8:32.27	6	—N/a		Did not advance	22
Niklas Buchholz	3000 metres steeplechase	8:29.53	5 Q	—N/a		8:42.81	15
Frederik Ruppert	3000 metres steeplechase	8:24.87	4 Q	—N/a		8:39.83	12
Gregory Minoué	110 metres hurdles	13.50	5 q	13.56	6	Did not advance	18
Manuel Mordi	110 metres hurdles	14.25	8	Did not advance			41
Joshua Abuaku	400 metres hurdles	49.41	6	Did not advance			29
Emil Agyekum	400 metres hurdles	48.33	2 Q	47.83 PB	3 q	47.98	6
Owe Fischer-Breiholz	400 metres hurdles	48.81	3 Q	DNS			
Leo Köpp	20 kilometres walk	—N/a				1:20:35	11
Christopher Linke	20 kilometres walk	—N/a				1:20:11	10
Johannes Frenzl	35 kilometres walk	—N/a				2:36:47	17
Jonathan Hilbert	35 kilometres walk	—N/a				2:36:47	16
Christopher Linke	35 kilometres walk	—N/a				2:36:10	14
Julian Wagner; Marvin Schulte; Owen Ansah; Lucas Ansah-Peprah; Deniz Almas (heats)	4 × 100 metres relay	38.12 SB	3 Q	—N/a		38.29	5

Field events

Athlete	Event	Qualification		Final	
Athlete	Event	Distance	Position	Distance	Position
Tobias Potye	High jump	2.16	22	Did not advance	
Torben Blech	Pole vault	5.40	30	Did not advance	
Bo Kanda Lita Baehre	Pole vault	5.75 SB	7 q	5.75 SB	10
Oleg Zernikel	Pole vault	5.55	23	Did not advance	
Simon Batz	Long jump	7.92	17	Did not advance	
Max Heß	Triple jump	16.09	29	Did not advance	
Henrik Janssen	Discus throw	66.47	5 q	NM	
Mika Sosna	Discus throw	64.99	12 q	58.60	11
Steven Richter	Discus throw	64.06	13	Did not advance	
Merlin Hummel	Hammer throw	78.54	3 Q	82.77 PB	2nd place, silver medalist(s)
Julian Weber	Javelin throw	87.21	2 Q	86.11	5

Combined events – Decathlon

Athlete	Event	100 m	LJ	SP	HJ	400 m	110H	DT	PV	JT	1500 m	Final	Rank
Niklas Kaul	Result	11.34	7.21	14.58	2.05 =SB	48.13 SB	14.45 =SB	47.29	4.70	78.19 SB	4:20.76	8538	4
Niklas Kaul	Points	786	864	764	850	903	917	814	819	1015	806	8538	4
Leo Neugebauer	Result	10.80	7.62	16.70 SB	1.99	48.27	14.80	56.15 CDB	5.10 =SB	64.34 PB	4:31.89 PB	8804 SB	1st place, gold medalist(s)
Leo Neugebauer	Points	906	965	894	794	896	874	999	941	803	732	8804 SB	1st place, gold medalist(s)
Till Steinforth	Result	11.16	7.07	13.73	DNS	DNF							
Till Steinforth	Points	825	830	712	0	DNF							

=== Women ===
Track and road events

Athlete	Event	Heat		Semifinal		Final	
Athlete	Event	Result	Rank	Result	Rank	Result	Rank
Gina Lückenkemper	100 metres	11.12	4 q	11.11	4	Did not advance	13
Lisa Mayer	100 metres	11.45	5	Did not advance			41
Sina Mayer	100 metres	11.41	5	Did not advance			37
Sophia Junk	200 metres	22.81	3 Q	22.71	5	Did not advance	13
Jessica-Bianca Wessolly	200 metres	23.33	7	Did not advance			38
Smilla Kolbe	800 metres	2:01.74	7	Did not advance			42
Majtie Kolberg	800 metres	2:00.64	4	Did not advance			31
Jolanda Kallabis	1500 metres	4:08.71	10	Did not advance			37
Nele Weßel	1500 metres	4:03.57 PB	6 Q	4:18.21	11 qR	4:10.31	14
Elena Burkard	5000 metres	15:37.33	19	—N/a		Did not advance	38
Lea Meyer	5000 metres	15:05.86	11	—N/a		Did not advance	23
Eva Dieterich	10,000 metres	—N/a				33:46.76	23
Olivia Gürth	3000 metres steeplechase	9:15.28	6	—N/a		Did not advance	16
Gesa Felicitas Krause	3000 metres steeplechase	9:16.76 SB	4 Q	—N/a		9:14.27 SB	7
Lea Meyer	3000 metres steeplechase	9:13.18	4 Q	—N/a		9:24.42	12
Eileen Demes	400 metres hurdles	55.03	5 q	55.98	8	Did not advance	24
Elena Kelety	400 metres hurdles	54.74	4 Q	54.61 PB	5	Did not advance	15
Sina Mayer; Rebekka Haase; Sophia Junk; Gina Lückenkemper	4 × 100 metres relay	41.86 SB	2 Q	—N/a		41.87	3rd place, bronze medalist(s)
Skadi Schier; Johanna Martin; Jana Lakner; Elisa Lechleitner	4 × 400 metres relay	3:25.33 SB	6	—N/a		Did not advance	10

Field events

Athlete	Event	Qualification		Final	
Athlete	Event	Distance	Position	Distance	Position
Christina Honsel	High jump	1.92	10 q	1.93	7
Imke Onnen	High jump	1.88	12 q	1.93	11
Malaika Mihambo	Long jump	6.63	9 q	6.99	2nd place, silver medalist(s)
Caroline Joyeux	Triple jump	14.19	9 q	14.00	10
Jessie Maduka	Triple jump	13.47	30	Did not advance	
Alina Kenzel	Shot put	18.56	11 q	18.42	10
Katharina Maisch	Shot put	18.82	10 q	18.21	11
Yemisi Ogunleye	Shot put	19.65	1 Q	19.33	6
Shanice Craft	Discus throw	63.51	7 q	65.21	8
Kristin Pudenz	Discus throw	62.02	13	Did not advance	
Marike Steinacker	Discus throw	57.43	30	Did not advance	
Samantha Borutta	Hammer throw	68.96	20	Did not advance	
Aileen Kuhn	Hammer throw	70.85	11 q	71.57	9

Combined events – Heptathlon

Athlete	Event	100H	HJ	SP	200 m	LJ	JT	800 m	Final	Rank
Vanessa Grimm	Result	13.74	1.65	13.79	DNS	DNF				
Vanessa Grimm	Points	1015	795	780	0	DNF				
Sandrina Sprengel	Result	13.60	1.77 SB	14.29 PB	24.36 SB	6.25	51.66 PB	2:15.95 PB	6434 PB	5
Sandrina Sprengel	Points	1036	941	813	946	927	892	879	6434 PB	5

=== Mixed ===
Track events

Athlete	Event	Heat		Final	
Athlete	Event	Result	Rank	Result	Rank
Manuel Sanders; Johanna Martin; Emil Agyekum; Elisa Lechleitner	4 × 400 metres relay	3:13.61	7	Did not advance	12
