= Puerto Rico at the 2025 World Athletics Championships =

- Flag of Puerto Rico
- WA code: PUR

in Tokyo, Japan 13 September 2025 – 21 September 2025
- Competitors: 12 (5 men and 7 women)
- Medals Ranked 27th: Gold 0 Silver 1 Bronze 0 Total 1

World Athletics Championships appearances (overview)
- 1983; 1987; 1991; 1993; 1995; 1997; 1999; 2001; 2003; 2005; 2007; 2009; 2011; 2013; 2015; 2017; 2019; 2022; 2023; 2025

Puerto Rico competed at the 2025 World Athletics Championships in Tokyo, Japan, from 13 to 21 September 2025.

== Medalists ==
Medal	Athlete	Event	Date
Silver	Ayden Owens-Delerme	Men's decathlon	September 21

== Results ==
Puerto Rico entered 12 athletes to the championships: 7 women and 5 men.

Key

- Q = Qualified for the next round
- q = Qualified for the next round as a fastest loser or, in field events, by position without achieving the qualifying target
- NR = National record
- PB = Personal best
- SB = Season best
- N/A = Round not applicable for the event

=== Men ===
Track and road events

Athlete	Event	Heat		Semifinal		Final	
Athlete	Event	Result	Rank	Result	Rank	Result	Rank
Eloy Benitez	100 metres	10.23	6	Did not advance			
José Figueroa	200 metres	20.62	6	Did not advance			

Field events

Athlete	Event	Qualification		Final	
Athlete	Event	Distance	Position	Distance	Position
Luis Castro Rivera	High jump	NM		Did not advance	
Jerome Vega	Hammer throw	73.12	24	Did not advance	

Combined events – Decathlon

Athlete	Event	100 m	LJ	SP	HJ	400 m	110H	DT	PV	JT	1500 m	Final	Rank
Ayden Owens-Delerme	Result	10.31	7.32	15.55	1.96	46.46	13.65	46.12	5.10	58.79	4:17.91	8784 NR	2nd place, silver medalist(s)
Ayden Owens-Delerme	Points	1020	891	824	767	985	1020	790	941	720	826	8784 NR	2nd place, silver medalist(s)

=== Women ===
Track and road events

Athlete	Event	Heat		Semifinal		Final	
Athlete	Event	Result	Rank	Result	Rank	Result	Rank
Gladymar Torres	100 metres	11.52	6	Did not advance			
Gabby Scott	400 metres	52.55	8	Did not advance			
Grace Claxton	400 metres hurdles	56.14	7	Did not advance			
Rachelle de Orbeta	20 kilometres walk	—N/a				1:32:47 SB	26
Naomi Garcia	35 kilometres walk	—N/a				3:21:57	38

Field events

Athlete	Event	Qualification		Final	
Athlete	Event	Distance	Position	Distance	Position
Alysbeth Félix	Long jump	6.58	13	Did not advance	
Paola Fernandez	Long jump	6.58	14	Did not advance	
