= Kendrick Thompson =

Bahamian athlete

Personal information
- Nationality: Bahamian
- Born: 28 August 1997 (age 28)

Sport
- Sport: Athletics
- Event: Decathlon

Achievements and titles
- Personal bests: Heptathlon: 5963 (Indianapolis, 2026); Decathlon: 8182 (Gotzis, 2023)
Medal record
Men's athletics
Representing the Bahamas
NACAC Championships
Bronze medal – third place	2025 Freeport	Decathlon

Kendrick Thompson (born 28 August 1997) is a multi-event athlete from The Bahamas.

== Early life ==
He is from Andros, The Bahamas. Thompson studied physical education at the University of the Bahamas.

== Career ==
=== 2021-2023: National record holder ===
At the Bahamas Association of Athletic Associations’ Easter Track Classic in 2021, he beat Ken Mullings' national record for the decathlon gathering a total of 7,644 points with Mullings second in the event on 7,642 points, both scores breaking the previous record of 7,427 points set in 2019. During the event Thompson had personal best performances in four events; the javelin, 1500m, 110m hurdles and long jump.

In April 2022, competing in Miami, Florida, Thompson accumulated a total of 7,762 points to set a new national record in the decathlon. The following month, he broke the national record again in the decathlon at The Jacksonville Combined Event Qualifier with a total of 7,788 points. He competed for the Bahamas at the 2022 Commonwealth Games in Birmingham, England, becoming the first Bahamian to compete in the decathlon at the games, and was sitting seventh overall after the first day of competition, but had to withdraw after suffering an injury during the pole vault competition and was unable to compete in the javelin.

In 2023, he improved on his own national record with a score of 8,038 with a fourth-place finish at the Mt. SAC Relays in Walnut, California. He then improved it again at the Hypo-Meeting in Götzis, scoring a total of 8,211 points for a ninth place finish.

=== 2024: Shark attack ===
Thompson was unable to compete in 2024 after surviving a boat accident and a shark bite. His recovery led him to be nicknamed in local media as the 'Bionic Man'. While he was away from competition, Ken Mullings regained the Bahamian national record, and scored 8226 points at the 2024 Olympic Games.

=== 2025— return to action ===
He finished third at the Mt. SAC Relays decathlon in April 2025 with 8009 points. He competed at the Hypo-Meeting in Götzis in May 2025 scoring 8079 points for fifteenth place. He competed the 2025 Décastar decathlon in Talence, France, a gold meeting on the World Athletics Combined Events Tour, placing third overall with a score of 8177 points. He won the silver medal in the decathlon at the 2025 NACAC Championships. He placed eighth with 8175 points at the 2025 World Athletics Championships in Tokyo, Japan. He placed seventh overall in the season-long World Athletics Combined Events Tour for 2025.

In his second indoor heptathlon he scored a personal best of 5963 points at the USA Indoor Combined Events Championships in Indianapolis in February 2026, placing third behind Hakim McMorris and Heath Baldwin. He qualified for the 2026 World Athletics Indoor Championships in Poland, placing tenth overall.
