= Heath Baldwin =

American athlete (born 2001)

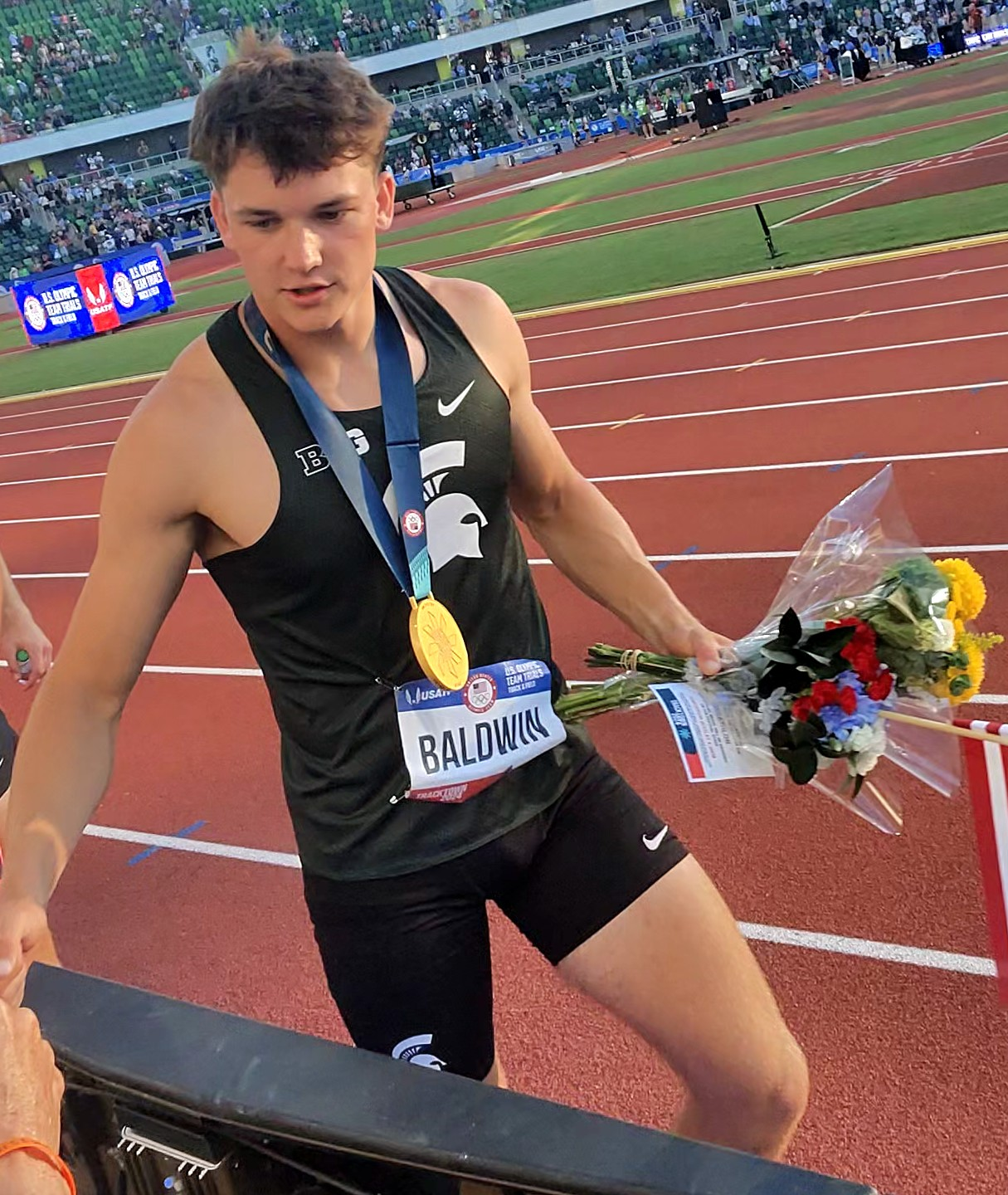
- Baldwin at the 2024 United States Olympic trials

Personal information
- Nationality: United States
- Born: February 8, 2001 (age 25)
- Home town: Kalamazoo, Michigan, U.S.
- Education: Michigan State University
- Height: 6 ft 4 in (193 cm)

Sport
- Sport: Athletics
- Event: Decathlon
- Coached by: Petros Kyprianou

Achievements and titles
- Personal bests: Decathlon: 8,625 (Eugene 2024); Heptathlon: 6,337 (Toruń 2026)
Medal record
Men's athletics
Representing the United States
World Indoor Championships
Silver medal – second place	2026 Toruń	Heptathlon

Heath Baldwin (born February 8, 2001) is an American decathlete. The American champion in 2024, he competed at the 2024 Olympic Games. He was the silver medalist in the heptathlon at the 2026 World Indoor Championships.

== Early life ==
Baldwin is from Kalamazoo, Michigan, where he attended Hackett Catholic Prep High School. The youngest of four siblings, he was a keen baseball player before focusing on track and field after being persuaded to try it by his strength and conditioning coach. He also played American football and basketball to all-state standard. He initially competed for the Michigan Wolverines track and field team before later transferring to Michigan State University.

== Career ==
Baldwin was runner up to Leo Neugebauer at the 2024 NCAA Indoor Championships heptathlon in March 2024 in Boston, Massachusetts. In the outdoor season in 2024, Baldwin skipped the regional and national collegiate trials to focus on the Olympic trials. In June 2024, he won the decathlon at the 2024 United States Olympic trials in Eugene, Oregon, having also led overnight following the first day of competition. In winning the title he scored a personal best 8,625 points.

He competed in Paris at the 2024 Summer Olympics in the decathlon, finishing in tenth place overall with a score of 8,422 points. He finished third overall in the 2024 World Athletics Combined Events Tour.

He was selected for the 2025 World Athletics Indoor Championships in Nanjing in March 2025, where he was in second place after the first day before eventually finishing fourth overall.

He finished eighth at the Hypo-Meeting in Götzis on 1 June 2025 with a tally of 8,430 points. He was runner-up in the decathlon at the 2025 USA Outdoor Track and Field Championships behind Kyle Garland, scoring 8,407 points. He placed sixth with 8337 points at the 2025 World Athletics Championships in Tokyo, Japan. He placed fifth overall in the season-long World Athletics Combined Events Tour for 2025.

Baldwin joined the University of Illinois staff as an assistant coach prior to the start of the 2026 indoor season. Baldwin placed second by only ten points in the heptathlon at the 2026 USATF Combined Events Championships on 22 February, finishing behind Hakim McMorris, securing a personal best overall score which placed him ninth on the American all-time list.

Baldwin won the silver medal in the heptathlon competing for the United States at the 2026 World Athletics Indoor Championships in Toruń, Poland, finishing in second place with a score of 6337 points behind a world-record setting Simon Ehammer with Kyle Garland in third. He finished the season placed fourth in the 2026 World Athletics Combined Events Tour rankings.

== Personal bests ==
Outdoor

As of September 21, 2025

Event	Performance	Location	Date	Points
Decathlon	—N/a	Eugene	June 22, 2024	8,625 points
100 meters	10.77 (+0.7 m/s)	Götzis	May 31, 2025	912 points
Long jump	7.59 m (24 ft 10 3/4 in) (+0.9 m/s)	Ann Arbor	May 11, 2024	957 points
Long jump	7.67 m (25 ft 1 3/4 in) (+3.1 m/s)	Walnut	April 17, 2024	—N/a
Shot put	16.52 m (54 ft 2 1/4 in)	Eugene	June 21, 2024	883 points
High jump	2.17 m (7 ft 1 1/4 in)	Saint-Denis	August 2, 2024	963 points
400 meters	48.39	Eugene	July 31, 2025	890 points
110 meters hurdles	13.71 (+0.1 m/s)	Lexington	May 24, 2024	1,012 points
Discus throw	45.11 m (147 ft 11 3/4 in)	Eugene	August 1, 2025	769 points
Pole vault	4.82 m (15 ft 9 3/4 in)	Champaign	May 2, 2025	856 points
Javelin throw	71.02 m (233 ft 0 in)	Walnut	April 18, 2024	905 points
1500 meters	4:33.42	Tokyo	September 21, 2025	722 points
Virtual Best Performance				8,869 points

Indoor

Event	Performance	Location	Date	Points
Decathlon	—N/a	Boston	March 9, 2024	6,238 points
60 metres	7.02	Boston	March 8, 2024	875 points
Long jump	7.29 m (23 ft 11 in)	Albuquerque	March 10, 2023	883 points
Shot put	16.00 m (52 ft 5 3/4 in)	Nanjing	March 22, 2025	851 points
High jump	2.15 m (7 ft 1/2 in)	Geneva, Ohio	February 24, 2023	944 points
60 metres hurdles	7.81	Geneva, Ohio	February 24, 2024	1,030 points
Pole vault	4.86 m (15 ft 11 1/4 in)	Boston	March 4, 2024	868 points
1000 metres	2:41.95	Nanjing	March 23, 2025	852 points
Virtual Best Performance				6,303 points
