= 2017 World Youth Championships in Athletics – Boys' decathlon =

The Boys' decathlon at the 2017 World Youth Championships in Athletics was held on 12–13 July.

== Medalists ==
| Gold | Silver | Bronze |

== Records ==
Prior to the competition, the following records were as follows.

| World Youth Best | Niklas Kaul (GER) | 8002 | Cali, Colombia | 16 July 2015 |
| Championship Record | Niklas Kaul (GER) | 8002 | Cali, Colombia | 16 July 2015 |
| World Youth Leading | Ashley Moloney (AUS) | 7559 | Sydney, Australia | 30 March 2017 |

== Results ==
=== 100 metres ===
| Rank | Heat | Lane | Name | Nationality | Time | Notes | Points |
|---|---|---|---|---|---|---|---|
| 1 | 2 | 8 | Steven Fauvel Clinch | France | 10.82 | PB | 901 |
| 2 | 2 | 2 | Damián Moretta | Argentina | 11.19 | | 819 |
| 3 | 2 | 7 | Florian Fourre | France | 11.32 | | 791 |
| 4 | 1 | 7 | Lex Damit | Luxembourg | 11.35 | PB | 784 |
| 5 | 2 | 3 | Jorge Dávila | Spain | 11.43 | PB | 767 |
| 6 | 2 | 4 | Maximilian Kluth | Germany | 11.44 | | 765 |
| 7 | 2 | 5 | Leo Neugebauer | Germany | 11.46 | | 761 |
| 8 | 2 | 6 | Tomas Sabašinskas | Lithuania | 11.53 | | 746 |
| 9 | 1 | 2 | Olegs Kozjakovs | Latvia | 11.56 | PB | 740 |
| 10 | 1 | 5 | Georgios Kanaris | Cyprus | 11.58 | PB | 736 |
| 11 | 1 | 3 | Reza Kefayati | Iran | 11.67 | PB | 717 |
| 12 | 1 | 8 | Sun Qihao | China | 11.77 | | 697 |
| 13 | 1 | 4 | Roman Voytseshuk | Ukraine | 11.83 | | 685 |
| 14 | 1 | 6 | Hussein Ali Mohammedawi | Iraq | 11.99 | PB | 653 |

=== Long jump ===
| Rank | Group | Name | Nationality | #1 | #2 | #3 | Mark | Notes | Points | Total |
|---|---|---|---|---|---|---|---|---|---|---|
| 1 | A | Steven Fauvel Clinch | France | 6.99 | 7.38 | 5.75 | 7.38 | PB | 905 | 1806 |
| 2 | A | Leo Neugebauer | Germany | 7.04 | x | 7.25 | 7.25 | PB | 874 | 1635 |
| 3 | B | Olegs Kozjakovs | Latvia | 6.89 | x | 6.70 | 6.89 | PB | 788 | 1528 |
| 4 | A | Jorge Dávila | Spain | 6.48 | 6.61 | 6.88 | 6.88 | PB | 785 | 1552 |
| 5 | A | Tomas Sabašinskas | Lithuania | 6.67 | 6.53 | 6.70 | 6.70 | PB | 743 | 1489 |
| 6 | A | Lex Damit | Luxembourg | x | 6.69 | 6.37 | 6.69 | PB | 741 | 1525 |
| 7 | A | Florian Fourre | France | 6.27 | x | 6.67 | 6.67 | | 736 | 1527 |
| 8 | B | Sun Qihao | China | 6.63 | 6.58 | 6.46 | 6.63 | PB | 727 | 1424 |
| 9 | B | Georgios Kanaris | Cyprus | 6.35 | 4.24 | 6.36 | 6.36 | PB | 666 | 1402 |
| 10 | B | Damián Moretta | Argentina | 6.25 | 6.04 | 6.13 | 6.25 | PB | 641 | 1460 |
| 11 | B | Reza Kefayati | Iran | 5.92 | 5.77 | 6.11 | 6.11 | PB | 610 | 1327 |
| 12 | B | Roman Voytseshuk | Ukraine | 5.62 | 6.05 | 5.72 | 6.05 | PB | 597 | 1282 |
| 13 | B | Hussein Ali Mohammedawi | Iraq | 5.51 | 5.49 | 5.26 | 5.51 | PB | 483 | 1136 |
| | A | Maximilian Kluth | Germany | | | | DNS | | | |

=== Shot put ===
| Rank | Group | Name | Nationality | #1 | #2 | #3 | Mark | Notes | Points | Total |
|---|---|---|---|---|---|---|---|---|---|---|
| 1 | A | Olegs Kozjakovs | Latvia | x | 15.94 | 18.06 | 18.06 | PB | 979 | 2507 |
| 2 | A | Georgios Kanaris | Cyprus | 16.21 | 16.16 | 15.76 | 16.21 | | 864 | 2266 |
| 3 | A | Tomas Sabašinskas | Lithuania | 15.86 | 15.50 | x | 15.50 | PB | 843 | 2332 |
| 4 | A | Sun Qihao | China | 15.26 | x | x | 15.26 | PB | 806 | 2230 |
| 5 | B | Jorge Dávila | Spain | 13.24 | x | 15.10 | 15.10 | PB | 796 | 2348 |
| 6 | A | Leo Neugebauer | Germany | 12.57 | 14.51 | 14.06 | 14.51 | | 760 | 2395 |
| 7 | B | Steven Fauvel Clinch | France | 13.46 | 14.09 | 11.57 | 14.09 | PB | 734 | 2540 |
| 8 | A | Roman Voytseshuk | Ukraine | 13.87 | 13.56 | x | 13.87 | | 720 | 2002 |
| 9 | B | Florian Fourre | France | x | 12.55 | 12.94 | 12.94 | | 664 | 2191 |
| 10 | B | Reza Kefayati | Iran | 10.78 | 12.49 | 12.83 | 12.83 | PB | 657 | 1984 |
| 11 | B | Damián Moretta | Argentina | 12.66 | 12.31 | 11.94 | 12.66 | | 647 | 2107 |
| 12 | B | Lex Damit | Luxembourg | 11.43 | 12.42 | 12.26 | 12.42 | | 632 | 2157 |
| 13 | B | Hussein Ali Mohammedawi | Iraq | 11.55 | 10.76 | 11.05 | 11.55 | PB | 579 | 1715 |
| | A | Maximilian Kluth | Germany | | | | DNS | | | |

=== High jump ===
| Rank | Group | Name | Nationality | 1.69 | 1.72 | 1.75 | 1.78 | 1.81 | 1.84 | 1.87 | 1.90 | 1.93 | 1.96 | 1.99 | 2.02 | Mark | Notes | Points |
|---|---|---|---|---|---|---|---|---|---|---|---|---|---|---|---|---|---|---|
| | A | Steven Fauvel Clinch | France | | | | | | | | | | | | | | | |
| | A | Maximilian Kluth | Germany | | | | | | | | | | | | | | | |
| | A | Roman Voytseshuk | Ukraine | | | | | | | | | | | | | | | |
| | A | Olegs Kozjakovs | Latvia | | | | | | | | | | | | | | | |
| | A | Jorge Dávila | Spain | | | | | | | | | | | | | | | |
| | A | Leo Neugebauer | Germany | | | | | | | | | | | | | | | |
| | A | Georgios Kanaris | Cyprus | | | | | | | | | | | | | | | |
| | B | Damián Moretta | Argentina | | | | | | | | | | | | | | | |
| | B | Sun Qihao | China | | | | | | | | | | | | | | | |
| | B | Florian Fourre | France | | | | | | | | | | | | | | | |
| | B | Reza Kefayati | Iran | | | | | | | | | | | | | | | |
| | B | Hussein Ali Mohammedawi | Iraq | | | | | | | | | | | | | | | |
| | B | Lex Damit | Luxembourg | | | | | | | | | | | | | | | |
| | B | Tomas Sabašinskas | Lithuania | | | | | | | | | | | | | | | |

=== 400 metres ===
| Rank | Heat | Lane | Name | Nationality | Time | Notes | Points |
|---|---|---|---|---|---|---|---|
| | 1 | 2 | Tomas Sabašinskas | Lithuania | | | |
| | 1 | 3 | Lex Damit | Luxembourg | | | |
| | 1 | 4 | Hussein Ali Mohammedawi | Iraq | | | |
| | 1 | 5 | Georgios Kanaris | Cyprus | | | |
| | 1 | 6 | Roman Voytseshuk | Ukraine | | | |
| | 1 | 7 | Sun Qihao | China | | | |
| | 1 | 8 | Reza Kefayati | Iran | | | |
| | 2 | 2 | Leo Neugebauer | Germany | | | |
| | 2 | 3 | Florian Fourre | France | | | |
| | 2 | 4 | Steven Fauvel Clinch | France | | | |
| | 2 | 5 | Damián Moretta | Argentina | | | |
| | 2 | 6 | Jorge Dávila | Spain | | | |
| | 2 | 7 | Maximilian Kluth | Germany | | | |
| | 2 | 8 | Olegs Kozjakovs | Latvia | | | |
