= Yuki Matsushita =

Yuki Matsushita may refer to:

- Yuki Matsushita (hurdler) (松下 祐樹, born 1991), Japanese hurdler
- Yuki Matsushita (footballer) (松下 裕樹, born 1981), Japanese football player
- Yuki Matsushita (actress) (松下 由樹, born 1968), Japanese actress
