= 2025 World Athletics Championships – Men's hammer throw =

Men's hammer throw at the 2025 World Athletics Championships
- Venue: National Stadium
- Location: Tokyo, Japan
- Dates: 15 September (qualification); 16 September (final)
- Winning distance: 84.70 m CR

Medalists
gold medal	Ethan Katzberg	Canada
silver medal	Merlin Hummel	Germany
bronze medal	Bence Halász	Hungary

The men's hammer throw at the 2025 World Athletics Championships was held at the National Stadium in Tokyo on 15 and 16 September 2025.

== Records ==
Before the competition records were as follows:

Record	Athlete & Nat.	Perf.	Location	Date
World record	Yuriy Sedykh (URS)	86.74 m	Stuttgart, West Germany	30 August 1986
Championship record	Ivan Tsikhan (BLR)	83.63 m	Osaka, Japan	27 August 2007
World Leading	Bence Halász (HUN)	83.18 m	Budapest, Hungary	12 August 2025
African Record	Mostafa Elgamel (EGY)	81.27 m	Cairo, Egypt	21 March 2014
Asian Record	Koji Murofushi (JPN)	84.86 m	Prague, Czech Republic	29 June 2003
European Record	Yuriy Sedykh (URS)	86.74 m	Stuttgart, West Germany	30 August 1986
North, Central American and Caribbean record	Ethan Katzberg (CAN)	84.38 m	Nairobi, Kenya	20 April 2024
Oceanian record	Stuart Rendell (AUS)	79.29 m	Varaždin, Croatia	6 July 2002
South American Record	Wagner Domingos (BRA)	78.63 m	Celje, Slovenia	19 June 2016

== Qualification standard ==
The standard to qualify automatically for entry was 78.20 m.

== Schedule ==
The event schedule, in local time (UTC+9), was as follows:

Date	Time	Round
15 September	09:00	Qualification
16 September	21:01	Final

== Results ==
=== Qualification ===
All athletes over 76.50 m ( Q ) or at least the 12 best performers ( q ) advanced to the final.

==== Group A ====
Place	Athlete	Nation	Round			Mark	Notes
Place	Athlete	Nation	#1	#2	#3	Mark	Notes
1	Bence Halász	Hungary	78.42			78.42 m	Q
2	Eivind Henriksen	Norway	x	77.70		77.70 m	Q, SB
3	Mykhaylo Kokhan	Ukraine	77.33			77.33 m	Q
4	Trey Knight	United States	70.92	73.13	76.40	76.40 m	q
5	Denzel Comenentia	Netherlands	x	72.63	75.91	75.91 m	q
6	Yann Chaussinand	France	75.46	x	74.15	75.46 m	
7	Rowan Hamilton	Canada	70.75	75.38	x	75.38 m	
8	Matija Gregurić	Croatia	74.66	74.31	x	74.66 m	
9	Ronald Mencía Zayas	Cuba	73.98	73.33	74.14	74.14 m	
10	Henri Liipola	Finland	72.36	72.77	73.82	73.82 m	
11	Humberto Mansilla	Chile	72.88	73.34	72.89	73.34 m	
12	Joaquín Gómez	Argentina	71.13	72.68	x	72.68 m	
13	Patrik Hájek	Czech Republic	71.40	69.93	72.63	72.63 m	
14	Ragnar Carlsson	Sweden	72.51	x	x	72.51 m	
15	Giorgio Olivieri	Italy	71.41	70.82	68.39	71.41 m	
16	Angelos Mantzouranis	Greece	70.94	x	x	70.94 m	
17	Özkan Baltacı	Turkey	x	69.34	x	69.34 m	
18	Marcin Wrotyński	Poland	x	x	69.33	69.33 m	

==== Group B ====
Place	Athlete	Nation	Round			Mark	Notes
Place	Athlete	Nation	#1	#2	#3	Mark	Notes
1	Ethan Katzberg	Canada	81.85			81.85 m	Q
2	Paweł Fajdek	Poland	75.74	78.78		78.78 m	Q
3	Merlin Hummel	Germany	78.54			78.54 m	Q
4	Rudy Winkler	United States	77.46			77.46 m	Q
5	Thomas Mardal	Norway	77.34			77.34 m	Q
6	Ármin Szabados	Hungary	75.42	77.20		77.20 m	Q
7	Dániel Rába	Hungary	75.38	75.03	76.21	76.21 m	q, SB
8	Volodymyr Myslyvčuk	Czech Republic	75.32	74.31	75.69	75.69 m	
9	Christos Frantzeskakis	Greece	73.41	x	75.43	75.43 m	
10	Daniel Haugh	United States	x	74.87	74.11	74.87 m	
11	Konstantinos Zaltos	Greece	73.21	73.80	73.96	73.96 m	
12	Gabriel Kehr	Chile	73.59	73.32	x	73.59 m	
13	Jerome Vega	Puerto Rico	72.90	x	73.12	73.12 m	
14	Jake Norris	Great Britain & N.I.	73.07	x	72.82	73.07 m	
15	Shota Fukuda	Japan	72.25	72.71	x	72.71 m	
16	Mostafa El Gamel	Egypt	72.03	71.84	70.51	72.03 m	
17	Halil Yilmazer	Turkey	71.41	70.44	71.71	71.71 m	
18	Wang Qi	China	70.96	x	70.96	70.96 m	

=== Final ===
Place	Athlete	Nation	Round						Mark	Notes
Place	Athlete	Nation	#1	#2	#3	#4	#5	#6	Mark	Notes
1st place, gold medalist(s)	Ethan Katzberg	Canada	82.66	84.70	82.01	81.86	83.07	83.73	84.70 m	CR, PB, WL
2nd place, silver medalist(s)	Merlin Hummel	Germany	82.77	80.71	x	82.14	x	x	82.77 m	PB
3rd place, bronze medalist(s)	Bence Halász	Hungary	81.51	80.03	82.69	80.85	80.80	x	82.69 m	
4	Mykhaylo Kokhan	Ukraine	x	x	78.36	79.51	82.02	x	82.02 m	PB
5	Rudy Winkler	United States	x	x	78.52	x	x	77.44	78.52 m	
6	Thomas Mardal	Norway	77.11	77.70	78.02	x	76.83	75.92	78.02 m	
7	Paweł Fajdek	Poland	x	76.69	x	77.75	76.63		77.75 m	
8	Ármin Szabados	Hungary	75.65	75.69	76.21	77.15	x		77.15 m	
9	Eivind Henriksen	Norway	76.36	x	76.47	x			76.47 m	
10	Trey Knight	United States	68.24	76.11	74.63	x			76.11 m	
11	Dániel Rába	Hungary	73.79	x	75.22				75.22 m	
12	Denzel Comenentia	Netherlands	x	x	74.86				74.86 m	
