= Leo Neugebauer =

German athlete (born 2000)

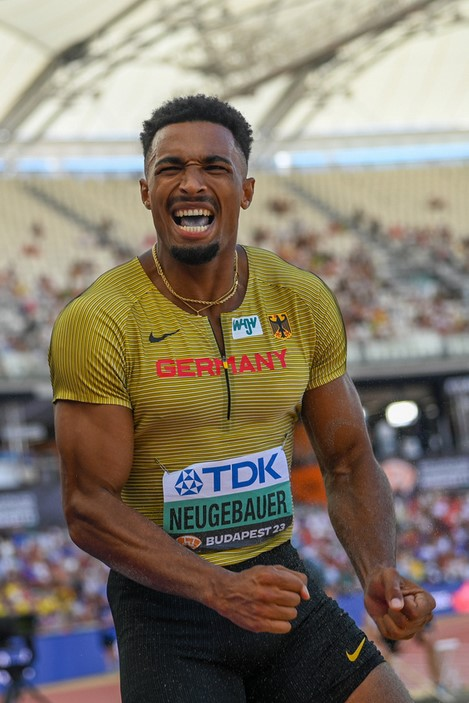
- Neugebauer at WCH 2023

Personal information
- Nationality: German
- Born: 19 June 2000 (age 26) Görlitz, Germany
- Height: 2.01 m (6 ft 7 in)
- Weight: 109 kg (240 lb)

Sport
- Sport: Athletics
- Events: Decathlon, heptathlon
- College team: Texas Longhorns
- Club: VfB Stuttgart

Achievements and titles
- Personal bests: Decathlon: 8,961 (2024) NR; Heptathlon: 6,347 (2024) NR
Medal record
Men's athletics
Representing Germany
Olympic Games
Silver medal – second place	2024 Paris	Decathlon
World Championships
Gold medal – first place	2025 Tokyo	Decathlon
European Championships
Gold medal – first place	2026 Birmingham	Decathlon

Leo Neugebauer (German pronunciation: [ˈleːoː ˈnɔʏɡəˌbaʊɐ]; born 19 June 2000) is a German multi-event track and field athlete. He is the German record holder in the decathlon and indoor heptathlon. In the decathlon, he is a World Athletics Championships gold medalist at the 2025 World Championships, European Athletics Championships gold medalist at the 2026 European Championships, and Olympic silver medalist in the decathlon at the 2024 Summer Olympics.

== Early life ==
Neugebauer was born in Görlitz and grew up in Stuttgart from the age of six weeks onwards. His mother, Diana, is from Germany, and his father, Terrance, is a football player from Cameroon. He has one sister.

Neugebauer joined the athletics club LG Leinfelden-Echterdingen, south of Stuttgart. He moved to the University of Texas at Austin in the United States on a sport scholarship to initially study mechanical engineering in 2019, but later switched to economics. In early 2024 before the Paris Olympics he left LG Leinfelden-Echterdingen and joined VfB Stuttgart.

== Career ==
=== 2022-2023: NCAA champion ===
Competing at the 2022 World Athletics Championships Neugebauer finished tenth overall in the men's decathlon.

Competing in the NCAA Championships for the University of Texas in June 2023, Neugebauer set a new collegiate record for the decathlon, with a points tally of 8,836 points that placed him in the top-10 of all time. The previous collegiate record of 8720 was set by Kyle Garland in 2022. Neugebauer also broke the meet record of 8457 set by Ashton Eaton in 2010 and equalled by Ayden Owens-Delerme in 2022. He earned personal bests in seven of the ten events, and his tally would have been enough to triumph at the previous years’ World Athletics Championships. Neugebauer also took the German national record of 8832 set in 1984 by Jürgen Hingsen.

In November 2023, he joined the track and field department of VfB Stuttgart.

=== 2024: National heptathlon record holder, Olympic medalist ===
Neugebauer won the heptathlon at the NCAA Indoor Championships in March 2024 in Boston, Massachusetts. His tally of 6,347 points added more than 50 points to a German national record that had stood for 22 years. He also won the decathlon at the NCAA Division I Outdoor Championships in a new collegiate and national record of 8,961 points. Additionally, he set the world decathlon best in the discus throw with a throw of 57.70 m.

At the 2024 Summer Olympics in Paris, Neugebauer won the silver medal in the Men's decathlon competition. This was Germany's first Olympic medal in the event since Frank Busemann was also awarded silver at the 1996 games.

=== 2025: World champion ===
Neugebauer finished fifth at the Hypo-Meeting in Götzis on 1 June 2025 with a tally of 8,555 points.

On September 21, 2025, Neugebauer won a gold medal for decathlon with 8,804 points at the 2025 World Athletics Championships in Tokyo, Japan, winning by twenty points ahead of Ayden Owens-Delerme of Puerto Rico.

=== 2026 ===
In May 2026, Neugebauer finished second to Simon Ehammer, finishing on 8730 points, at the Hypo-Meeting in Gotzis. In August, he won the decathlon at the 2026 European Championships in Birmingham, England, finishing just 38 points ahead of compatriot Niklas Kaul, with a final total of 8611 points. He finished the season placed second in the 2026 World Athletics Combined Events Tour rankings.

== Competition record ==
Representing Germany
Year	Competition	Venue	Position	Event	Result	Notes
2022	World Championships	Eugene	10th	Decathlon	8,182 points	
2023	World Championships	Budapest	5th	Decathlon	8,645 points	
2024	Olympic Games	Paris	2nd	Decathlon	8,748 points	
2025	World Championships	Tokyo	1st	Decathlon	8,804 points	
2026	European Championships	Birmingham	1st	Decathlon	8,611 points	

== Personal bests ==
Information from World Athletics profile unless otherwise noted.

Outdoor

As of 24 October 2025

Individual events
Event	Performance	Location	Date
Long jump	7.65 m (25 ft 1 in) (+1.0 m/s)	Lubbock	14 May 2022
High jump	1.90 m (6 ft 2 3/4 in)	Ulm	27 July 2019
Pole vault	5.30 m (17 ft 4 1/2 in)	Wetzlar	21 July 2024
100 metres	10.96 (−0.1 m/s)	Baton Rouge	30 April 2022
100 metres	10.69 (+4.1 m/s)	Austin	29 April 2023
110 metres hurdles	14.40 (+0.0 m/s)	Wetzlar	21 July 2024
110 metres hurdles	14.35 (+3.1 m/s)	Austin	29 April 2023
Shot put	15.75 m (51 ft 8 in)	Baton Rouge	30 April 2022
Discus throw	58.70 m (192 ft 7 in)	Walnut	19 April 2024

Combined events
Event	Performance	Location	Date	Score	Ref.
Decathlon	—N/a	Eugene	5–6 June 2024	8,961 points	—N/a
100 metres	10.61 (−0.3 m/s)	Austin	7 June 2023	949 points	
Long jump	8.00 m (26 ft 2 3/4 in) (−0.1 m/s)	Budapest	25 August 2023	1,061 points	
Shot put	17.46 m (57 ft 3 1/4 in)	Eugene	5 June 2024	942 points	
High jump	2.07 m (6 ft 9 1/4 in)	Filderstadt	2 June 2018	868 points	
400 metres	47.08	Austin	7 June 2023	954 points	
110 metres hurdles	14.33 (+1.3 m/s)	Austin	30 March 2023	932 points	
Discus throw	57.70 m (189 ft 3 1/2 in)^{[a]}	Eugene	6 June 2024	1,032 points	
Pole vault	5.21 m (17 ft 1 in)	Austin	8 June 2023	976 points	
Javelin throw	64.34 m (211 ft 1 in)	Tokyo	21 September 2025	803 points	
1500 metres	4:31.89	Tokyo	21 September 2025	732 points	
Virtual Best Performance				9,249 points	—N/a

^{a} Decathlon best

Indoor

As of 24 October 2025

Individual events
Event	Performance	Location	Date
Long jump	7.70 m (25 ft 3 in)	Clemson	14 January 2022
High jump	1.99 m (6 ft 6 1/4 in)	Lubbock	27 February 2021
Pole vault	5.05 m (16 ft 6 3/4 in)	Fayetteville	22 January 2021
60 metres	7.12	Clemson	14 February 2020
600 metres	1:20.74	Clemson	14 February 2025
60 metres hurdles	8.28	Clemson	14 January 2022
Shot put	17.10 m (56 ft 1 in)	Louisville	13 January 2024

Combined events
Event	Performance	Location	Date	Score
Heptathlon	—N/a	Boston	8–9 March 2024	6,265 points
60 metres	6.96	Albuquerque	2 February 2024	897 points
Long jump	7.87 m (25 ft 9 3/4 in)	Fayetteville	11 March 2021	1,027 points
Shot put	16.77 m (55 ft 0 in)	Albuquerque	2 February 2024	899 points
High jump	2.09 m (6 ft 10 1/4 in)	Boston	8 March 2024	887 points
60 metres hurdles	8.17	Boston	27 January 2023	939 points
Pole vault	5.16 m (16 ft 11 in)	Boston	9 March 2024	960 points
1000 metres	2:43.55	Albuquerque	11 March 2023	834 points
Virtual Best Performance				6,443 points

== Honors and awards ==
- The Bowerman
- German Sportspersonality of the Year 2025
