= Kyle Garland =

American decathlete

Personal information
- Born: May 28, 2000 (age 26)
- Home town: Philadelphia, PA, U.S.
- Height: 6 ft 4 in (193 cm)

Sport
- Country: United States
- Sport: Track and field
- Events: Decathlon, Heptathlon
- College team: Georgia Bulldogs
- Coached by: Carol Smith Gilbert and James Thomas

Achievements and titles
- Personal bests: Decathlon: 8,869 points (2025); Heptathlon: 6,639 points (2023)
Medal record
Men's athletics
Representing the United States
World Championships
Bronze medal – third place	2025 Tokyo	Decathlon
World Indoor Championships
Bronze medal – third place	2026 Toruń	Heptathlon
2017 Pan American U20 Athletics Championships
Silver medal – second place	Trujillo	Decathlon

Kyle Garland (born May 28, 2000) is an American decathlete. He won the bronze medal in the decathlon at the 2025 World Championships and in the heptathlon at the 2026 World Indoor Championships. He is the third-highest scoring decathlete in American history behind Ashton Eaton and Dan O'Brien.

== Prep career ==
Garland was born and raised in Philadelphia, Pennsylvania. He completed his prep career at private Germantown Academy before enrolling as a student at the University of Georgia. As a senior at Germantown, Garland won the 2018 PAISAA state championships in the long jump, javelin, 300 meter hurdles, and 110 meter hurdles.

As an unattached junior athlete, Garland won gold at the 2018 USATF U20 Championships in the decathlon scoring 7562 points. He then went on to finish 7th at the 2018 IAAF World U20 Championships.

== Collegiate career ==
Garland earned the nickname 'The Freight Train' from University of Georgia coach Caryl Smith-Gilbert. Garland set the decathlon collegiate record and personal best score of 8720 points in finishing second at the USA World Championship Trials in June 2022. This score included six personal bests, and placed him in the top 10 for all US decathletes, the top 20 for all decathletes. Garland won the 2023 NCAA Indoor Championships heptathlon title, setting an NCAA record 6,639 points, for his first collegiate title. That score was just six points from compatriot Ashton Eaton's world record.

== Professional career ==
Garland was selected to compete at the 2022 World Athletics Championships held in Eugene, Oregon. Garland placed in the top 10 after the shot put, long jump and 100 meters events before ultimately finishing eleventh on his senior major championship debut, which was won by world-record holder Kevin Mayer of France. He was selected for the 2023 World Athletics Championships in Budapest in August 2023.

Garland won the heptathlon at the 2025 USA Indoor Track and Field Championships in New York finishing ahead of Hakim McMorris, with 6139 points. He finished second at the Hypo-Meeting in Götzis on 1 June 2025 with a tally of 8626 points. He won the decathlon at the 2025 USA Outdoor Track and Field Championships, becoming the third-best performer in U.S. history with 8869 points, behind only Dan O'Brien and Ashton Eaton.

On September 21, 2025, he won the decathlon bronze medal with 8703 points at the 2025 World Athletics Championships in Tokyo, Japan. He finished runner-up to Sander Skotheim in the season-long World Athletics Combined Events Tour for 2025.

Garland won the bronze medal in the heptathlon competing for the United States at the 2026 World Athletics Indoor Championships in Toruń, Poland. He scored 6245 points to finish behind a world-record setting Simon Ehammer and compatriot Heath Baldwin. In July, Garland placed second in the decathlon at the 2026 USA Championships behind returning champion Garrett Scantling.

== International event ==
Year	Competition	Venue	Position	Event	Notes
Representing United States
2017	2017 Pan American U20 Athletics Championships	Trujillo, Peru	2nd	Decathlon	7212 points
2018	2018 IAAF World U20 Championships	Tampere, Finland	7th	Decathlon	7451 points
2022	2022 World Athletics Championships	Eugene, Oregon	11th	Decathlon	8133 points
2017	USATF U20 Outdoor Championships	California State University, Sacramento	2nd	Decathlon	7035 points
2018	USATF U20 Outdoor Championships	Bloomington, Indiana	1st	Decathlon	7562 points
2021	USA Olympic Trials Track and Field	University of Oregon	6th	Decathlon	8140 points
2022	USA Outdoor Track and Field Championships	University of Arkansas	2nd	Decathlon	8720 points

== National event ==
Year	Competition	Venue	Position	Event	Notes
Representing Georgia Bulldogs
2023	SEC Outdoor Track and Field Championships	Louisiana State University	1st	Decathlon	8589 points
2023	2023 NCAA Division I Indoor Track and Field Championships	Albuquerque, New Mexico	1st	Heptathlon	6639 points CR
2022	2022 NCAA Division I Outdoor Track and Field Championships	University of Oregon	3rd	Decathlon	8333 points
2022	USA Outdoor Track and Field Championships	University of Arkansas	2nd	Decathlon	8720 points
2022	2022 NCAA Division I Indoor Track and Field Championships	Birmingham Metro CrossPlex	2nd	Heptathlon	6200 points
2022	SEC Indoor Track and Field Championships	Texas A&M University	1st	Heptathlon	6205 points
2021	SEC Outdoor Track and Field Championships	Texas A&M University	1st	Decathlon	8196 points
2021	2021 NCAA Division I Indoor Track and Field Championships	University of Arkansas	2nd	Heptathlon	6200 points
2021	SEC Indoor Track and Field Championships	University of Arkansas	1st	Heptathlon	6012 points
2020	2020 SEC Indoor Track and Field Championships	Texas A&M University	1st	Heptathlon	5856 points

== Personal bests ==
Information from World Athletics profile unless otherwise noted. Outdoor

As of September 20, 2025

Combined events
Event	Performance	Location	Date	Score	Ref.
Decathlon	—N/a	Eugene	July 31 – August 1, 2025	8,869 points	—N/a
100 meters	10.44 (+1.1 m/s)	Eugene	July 31, 2025	989 points	
Long jump	7.92 m (25 ft 11 3/4 in) (+0.4 m/s)	Tokyo	September 20, 2025	1,040 points	
Shot put	17.02 m (55 ft 10 in)	Tokyo	September 20, 2025	914 points	
High jump	2.17 m (7 ft 1 1/4 in)	Eugene	June 19, 2021	963 points	
400 meters	47.78	Austin	June 7, 2023	920 points	
110 meters hurdles	13.54 (+1.6 m/s)	Austin	June 8, 2023	1,035 points	
Discus throw	50.93 m (167 ft 1 in)	Eugene	August 1, 2025	890 points	
Pole vault	4.90 m (16 ft 3/4 in)	Coral Gables	April 6, 2024	880 points	
Javelin throw	65.52 m (214 ft 11 1/2 in)	Eugene	August 1, 2025	821 points	
1500 meters	4:41.96	Eugene	June 9, 2022	668 points	
Virtual Best Performance				9,134 points	—N/a

Indoor

As of June 19, 2025

Combined events
Event	Performance	Location	Date	Score
Heptathlon	—N/a	Albuquerque	March 10–11, 2023	6,639 points
60 meters	6.86	Lubbock	January 26, 2023	933 points
Long jump	7.96 m (26 ft 1 1/4 in)	Albuquerque	March 10, 2023	1,050 points
Shot put	16.45 m (53 ft 11 1/2 in)	Albuquerque	March 10, 2023	879 points
High jump	2.19 m (7 ft 2 in)	Lubbock	January 26, 2023	982 points
60 meters hurdles	7.74	Albuquerque	March 11, 2023	1,048 points
Pole vault	5.16 m (16 ft 11 in)	Albuquerque	March 11, 2023	960 points
1000 meters	2:41.36	Albuquerque	March 11, 2023	858 points
Virtual Best Performance				6,710 points
