= 2025 World Athletics Championships – Men's 200 metres =

Men's 200 metres at the 2025 World Athletics Championships
- Venue: National Stadium
- Location: Tokyo, Japan
- Dates: 17 September (heats); 18 September (semi-finals); 19 September (final)
- Competitors: 54 from 34 nations
- Winning time: 19.52

Medalists
gold medal	Noah Lyles	United States
silver medal	Kenny Bednarek	United States
bronze medal	Bryan Levell	Jamaica

The men's 200 metres at the 2025 World Athletics Championships was held at the National Stadium in Tokyo on 17, 18 and 19 September 2025.

== Summary ==
The three-time defending champion, Noah Lyles, was aiming to match Usain Bolt's record of four World Championships gold medals in the 200. With a bye in the event, Lyles hadrun fewer races in the regular season, but still came in as the world leader. The two other favorites were Letsile Tebogo, defending Olympic champion; and Kenny Bednarek, with a collection of silvers over the last Olympics and World Championships.

In the heats, Bryan Levell was the fastest with 19.84, then Tapiwanashe Makarawu 19.91 and Courtney Lindsey in 19.95. In the last semfinal, Lyles ran a 19.51, ultimately faster than even the winning time in the final. The semis saw the elimination of several famous names including Andre De Grasse, Lindsay, Gout Gout, and Wayde van Niekerk.

The final went off with 5 men separating from the other three. Coming off the turn Levell had developed almost a 1-metre lead on Lyles and Bednarek, with Tebogo slightly behind them and Hughes still in contention. In just 10 quick steps, Lyles and Bednarek moved from behind Levell to a metre ahead. Down the straightaway, Lyles put a little more gap on Bednarek. Tebogo closed down as well but couldn't quite catch Levell.

== Records ==
Before the competition records were as follows:

Record	Athlete & Nat.	Perf.	Location	Date
World record	Usain Bolt (JAM)	19.19	Berlin, Germany	20 August 2009
Championship record	Usain Bolt (JAM)	19.19	Berlin, Germany	20 August 2009
World Leading	Noah Lyles (USA)	19.63	Eugene, United States	3 August 2025
African Record	Letsile Tebogo (BOT)	19.46	Paris, France	8 August 2024
Asian Record	Xie Zhenye (CHN)	19.88	London, United Kingdom	21 July 2019
European Record	Pietro Mennea (ITA)	19.72	Mexico City, Mexico	12 September 1979
North, Central American and Caribbean record	Usain Bolt (JAM)	19.19	Berlin, Germany	20 August 2009
Oceanian record	Gout Gout (AUS)	20.02	Ostrava, Czech Republic	24 June 2025
South American Record	Alonso Edward (PAN)	19.81	Berlin, Germany	20 August 2009

== Qualification standard ==
The standard to qualify automatically for entry was 20.16.

== Schedule ==
The event schedule, in local time (UTC+9), was as follows:

Date	Time	Round
17 September	20:15	Heats
18 September	21:02	Semi-finals
19 September	22:06	Final

== Results ==
=== Heats ===
The heats took place on 17 September. The first three athletes in each heat ( Q ) and the next six fastest ( q ) qualified for the semi-finals.

==== Heat 1 ====
Place	Lane	Athlete	Nation	Time	Notes
1	4	Alexander Ogando	Dominican Republic	20.10	Q
2	3	Wayde van Niekerk	South Africa	20.19	Q
3	9	Timothé Mumenthaler	Switzerland	20.39	Q
4	8	Henrik Larsson	Sweden	20.40	q, PB
5	5	Robert Gregory	United States	20.43	
6	6	Shōta Iizuka	Japan	20.64	
7	7	Toby Harries	Great Britain & N.I.	20.76	
8	2	Calab Law	Australia	20.91	
				Wind: (−0.2 m/s)	

==== Heat 2 ====
Place	Lane	Athlete	Nation	Time	Notes
1	6	Tapiwanashe Makarawu	Zimbabwe	19.91	Q
2	9	Courtney Lindsey	United States	19.95	Q
3	7	Adrian Kerr	Jamaica	20.13	Q
4	5	Ryan Zeze	France	20.23	q, SB
5	3	Aaron Brown	Canada	20.33	q
6	8	Aidan Murphy	Australia	20.54	
7	4	Emmanuel Eseme	Cameroon	20.61	
8	2	Gediminas Truskauskas	Lithuania	20.95	
				Wind: (−0.5 m/s)	

==== Heat 3 ====
Place	Lane	Athlete	Nation	Time	Notes
1	3	Kenny Bednarek	United States	19.98	Q
2	2	Udodi Onwuzurike	Nigeria	20.27	Q
3	7	Sinesipho Dambile	South Africa	20.27	Q
4	6	William Reais	Switzerland	20.38	q, SB
5	4	Jerome Blake	Canada	20.43	q
6	8	Ko Seung-hwan	South Korea	20.49	
7	9	Soshi Mizukubo	Japan	20.51	SB
8	1	Abdulaziz Abdui Atafi	Saudi Arabia	20.66	
9	5	Animesh Kujur	India	20.77	
				Wind: (−0.3 m/s)	

==== Heat 4 ====
Place	Lane	Athlete	Nation	Time	Notes
1	5	Noah Lyles	United States	19.99	Q
2	7	Zharnel Hughes	Great Britain & N.I.	20.07	Q
3	3	Christopher Taylor	Jamaica	20.26	Q, PB
4	4	Andre De Grasse	Canada	20.30	q
5	6	Fausto Desalu	Italy	20.43	
6	8	Joseph Fahnbulleh	Liberia	20.73	
7	2	Ian Kerr	Bahamas	20.92	
8	1	César Almirón	Paraguay	20.92	
	9	Hachim Maaroufou	Comoros	DNS	
				Wind: (+0.1 m/s)	

==== Heat 5 ====
Place	Lane	Athlete	Nation	Time	Notes
1	7	Bryan Levell	Jamaica	19.84	Q
2	5	Makanakaishe Charamba	Zimbabwe	20.06	Q
3	8	Gout Gout	Australia	20.23	Q
4	6	Blessing Afrifah	Israel	20.47	
5	9	Naeem Jack	South Africa	20.65	
6	4	Ibrahim Fuseini	Ghana	20.66	
7	2	Tomáš Němejc	Czech Republic	20.83	
8	1	Omar Simpson	U.S. Virgin Islands	21.58	
9	3	Tovetuna Tuna	Papua New Guinea	21.59	
				Wind: (−0.1 m/s)	

==== Heat 6 ====
Place	Lane	Athlete	Nation	Time	Notes
1	9	Letsile Tebogo	Botswana	20.18	Q
2	8	Xavi Mo-Ajok	Netherlands	20.35	Q
3	3	Towa Uzawa	Japan	20.39	Q
4	7	Jaleel Croal	British Virgin Islands	20.46	
5	4	Filippo Tortu	Italy	20.49	
6	2	José Figueroa	Puerto Rico	20.62	
7	5	Lidio Andrés Feliz	Dominican Republic	20.63	
8	6	Alham Naghiyev	Azerbaijan	21.10	
9	1	Darion Skerritt	Antigua and Barbuda	30.18	
				Wind: (±0.0 m/s)	

=== Semi-finals ===
The semi-finals took place on 18 September. The first two athletes in each heat ( Q ) and the next two fastest ( q ) qualified for the final.

==== Heat 1 ====
Place	Lane	Athlete	Nation	Time	Notes
1	7	Kenny Bednarek	United States	19.88	Q
2	8	Alexander Ogando	Dominican Republic	19.98	Q
3	6	Makanakaishe Charamba	Zimbabwe	20.03	
4	4	Wayde van Niekerk	South Africa	20.12	
5	9	Christopher Taylor	Jamaica	20.21	PB
6	5	Towa Uzawa	Japan	20.23	
7	2	William Reais	Switzerland	20.59	
8	3	Aaron Brown	Canada	20.59	
				Wind: (−0.1 m/s)	

==== Heat 2 ====
Place	Lane	Athlete	Nation	Time	Notes
1	8	Bryan Levell	Jamaica	19.78	Q
2	6	Letsile Tebogo	Botswana	19.95	Q
3	7	Courtney Lindsey	United States	20.30	
4	4	Gout Gout	Australia	20.36	
5	2	Jerome Blake	Canada	20.41	
6	5	Xavi Mo-Ajok	Netherlands	20.55	
7	9	Timothé Mumenthaler	Switzerland	20.66	
8	3	Ryan Zeze	France	20.73	
				Wind: (±0.0 m/s)	

==== Heat 3 ====
Place	Lane	Athlete	Nation	Time	Notes
1	6	Noah Lyles	United States	19.51	Q, WL
2	7	Zharnel Hughes	Great Britain & N.I.	19.95	Q
3	9	Sinesipho Dambile	South Africa	19.97	q, PB
4	8	Tapiwanashe Makarawu	Zimbabwe	19.98	q
5	4	Adrian Kerr	Jamaica	20.08	PB
6	3	Andre De Grasse	Canada	20.13	SB
7	5	Udodi Onwuzurike	Nigeria	20.26	
8	2	Henrik Larsson	Sweden	20.32	PB
				Wind: (+1.0 m/s)	

=== Final ===
The final took place on 19 September.

Place	Lane	Athlete	Nation	Time	Notes
1st place, gold medalist(s)	6	Noah Lyles	United States	19.52	
2nd place, silver medalist(s)	8	Kenny Bednarek	United States	19.58	SB
3rd place, bronze medalist(s)	7	Bryan Levell	Jamaica	19.64	PB
4	5	Letsile Tebogo	Botswana	19.65	SB
5	9	Zharnel Hughes	Great Britain & N.I.	19.78	SB
6	4	Alexander Ogando	Dominican Republic	20.01	
7	3	Tapiwanashe Makarawu	Zimbabwe	20.12	
8	2	Sinesipho Dambile	South Africa	20.23	
				Wind: (±0.0 m/s)	
