= France at the 2025 World Athletics Championships =

- Flag of France
- WA code: FRA

in Tokyo, Japan 13 September 2025 – 21 September 2025
- Competitors: 77 (46 men and 31 women)
- Medals Ranked 17th: Gold 1 Silver 0 Bronze 1 Total 2

World Athletics Championships appearances (overview)
- 1976; 1980; 1983; 1987; 1991; 1993; 1995; 1997; 1999; 2001; 2003; 2005; 2007; 2009; 2011; 2013; 2015; 2017; 2019; 2022; 2023; 2025

France competed at the 2025 World Athletics Championships in Tokyo, Japan, from 13 to 21 September 2025.

== Medallists ==
Medal	Athlete	Event	Date
Gold	Jimmy Gressier	Men's 10,000 metres	14 September
Bronze	Jimmy Gressier	Men's 5000 metres	21 September

== Results ==
France entered 77 athletes to the championships: 31 women and 46 men.

Key

- Q = Qualified for the next round
- q = Qualified for the next round as a fastest loser or, in field events, by position without achieving the qualifying target
- NR = National record
- PB = Personal best
- SB = Season best
- N/A = Round not applicable for the event

=== Men ===
Track and road events

Athlete	Event	Heat		Semifinal		Final	
Athlete	Event	Result	Rank	Result	Rank	Result	Rank
Ryan Zeze	200 metres	20.23 SB	4 q	20.73	8	Did not advance	
Yanis Meziane	800 metres	1:45.02	4 q	1:44.12	6	Did not advance	
Gabriel Tual	800 metres	1:46.54	3 Q	1:44.09	5	Did not advance	
Paul Anselmini	1500 metres	3:41.84	9	Did not advance			
Azeddine Habz	1500 metres	3:36.62	7	Did not advance			
Romain Mornet	1500 metres	3:37.19	4 Q	3:36.35	11	Did not advance	
Etienne Daguinos	5000 metres	13:14.87	8 Q	—N/a		13:11.72	14
Jimmy Gressier	5000 metres	13:41.64	2 Q	—N/a		12:59.61	3rd place, bronze medalist(s)
Yann Schrub	5000 metres	13:42.00	7 Q	—N/a		13:01.34	9
Jimmy Gressier	10,000 metres	—N/a				28:55.77 SB	1st place, gold medalist(s)
Wilhem Belocian	110 metres hurdles	13.27	2 Q	13.31	5	Did not advance	
Just Kwaou-Mathey	110 metres hurdles	13.25	2 Q	13.22	4 q	13.42	7
Sasha Zhoya	110 metres hurdles	13.43	3 WD	Did not advance			
Djilali Bedrani	3000 metres steeplechase	8:35.50	8	—N/a		Did not advance	
Nicolas-Marie Daru	3000 metres steeplechase	8:30.64	4 Q	—N/a		8:35.77	7
Louis Gilavert	3000 metres steeplechase	8:28.90	7	—N/a		Did not advance	
Lenny Chanteur; Jeff Erius; Aymeric Priam; Theo Schaub*; Ryan Zeze	4 × 100 metres relay	38.34	4 q	—N/a		38.58	7
Muhammad Abdallah Kounta; Loïc Prévot; David Sombé; Yann Spillmann	4 × 400 metres relay	3:01.64	7	—N/a		Did not advance	
Gabriel Bordier	20 kilometres walk	—N/a				1:19:23	5
Aurélien Quinion	20 kilometres walk	—N/a				1:18:49 PB	4
Kévin Campion	35 kilometres walk	—N/a				2:30:24	5
Aurélien Quinion	35 kilometres walk	—N/a				2:39:12	21

Field events

Athlete	Event	Qualification		Final	
Athlete	Event	Distance	Position	Distance	Position
Thibaut Collet	Pole vault	5.75	9 q	5.90	5
Ethan Corment	Pole vault	5.75	7 q	5.55	11
Renaud Lavillenie	Pole vault	5.75	10 q	5.75	8
Tom Campagne	Long jump	7.82	22	Did not advance	
Erwan Konaté	Long jump	7.87	19	Did not advance	
Thomas Gogois	Triple jump	14.09	32	Did not advance	
Melvin Raffin	Triple jump	Did not start		Did not advance	
Jonathan Seremes	Triple jump	17.07	5 q	16.82	8
Lolassonn Djouhan	Discus	63.13	18	Did not advance	
Jordan Guehaseim	Discus	56.64	36	Did not advance	
Yann Chaussinand	Hammer throw	75.46	16	Did not advance	

Combined events – Decathlon

Athlete	Event	100 m	LJ	SP	HJ	400 m	110H	DT	PV	JT	1500 m	Final	Rank
Antoine Ferranti	Result	11.19	7.23	13.60	2.05	48.64	14.78	43.04	4.60	53.06	4:13.52	8003	12
Antoine Ferranti	Points	819	869	704	850	878	876	727	790	634	856	8003	12
Makenson Gletty	Result	10.92	6.98	15.31	1.96	50.49	14.06	42.00	4.90	62.89	4:27.90	8146	9
Makenson Gletty	Points	878	809	767	792	967	705	880	781	758		8146	9

=== Women ===
Track and road events

Athlete	Event	Heat		Semifinal		Final	
Athlete	Event	Result	Rank	Result	Rank	Result	Rank
Hélène Parisot	200 metres	22.90	4 q	22.87	7	Did not advance	
Anaïs Bourgoin	800 metres	1:58.43	1 Q	1:58.00	3	Did not advance	
Rénelle Lamote	800 metres	1:59.32 SB	4 q	1:59.94	6	Did not advance	
Clara Liberman	800 metres	2:00.17	3 Q	2:04.12	9	Did not advance	
Agathe Guillemot	1500 metres	4:02.05	5 Q	4:11.33	9	Did not advance	
Sarah Madeleine	1500 metres	4:02.66	2 Q	4:01.30	6 Q	3:58.09 PB	7
Manon Trapp	Marathon	—N/a				2:36:09	32
Sacha Alessandrini	100 metres hurdles	12.99	3 Q	13.08	7	Did not advance	
Louise Maraval	400 metres hurdles	55.84	7	Did not advance			
Flavie Renouard	3000 metres steeplechase	9:14.69 PB	4 Q	—N/a		9:25.15	13
Gémima Joseph; Hélène Parisot; Sarah Richard; Marie-Ange Rimlinger	4 × 100 metres relay	42.71 SB	3 Q	—N/a		42.81	6
Isabelle Black*; Amandine Brossier; Alexe Déau; Louise Maraval; Fanny Peltier	4 × 400 metres relay	3:24.33 SB	q	—N/a		3:24.08 SB	7
Clemence Beretta	20 kilometres walk	—N/a				1:33:14	29
Pauline Stey	20 kilometres walk	—N/a				1:28:52	11

Field events

Athlete	Event	Qualification		Final	
Athlete	Event	Distance	Position	Distance	Position
Marie-Julie Bonnin	Pole vault	4.60	11 q	4.65	8
Hilary Kpatcha	Long jump	6.85	2 Q	6.82	4
Ilionis Guillaume	Triple jump	13.38	33	Did not advance	
Amanda Ngandu-Ntumba	Discus throw	57.60	29	Did not advance	
Mélina Robert-Michon	Discus throw	61.24	15	Did not advance	
Rose Loga	Hammer throw	70.44	13	Did not advance	

Combined events – Heptathlon

Athlete	Event	100H	HJ	SP	200 m	LJ	JT	800 m	Final	Rank
Auriana Lazraq-Khlass	Result	13.72	1.74 m	12.32 m	25.15	5.55 m	47.97 m	2:25.86	5758	18
Auriana Lazraq-Khlass	Points	1018	903	682	873	715	821	746	5758	18

=== Mixed ===
Athlete	Event	Heat		Final	
Athlete	Event	Result	Rank	Result	Rank
Téo Andant (M); Alexe Deau (W); Predea Manounou (M); Fanny Peltier (W)	4 × 400 metres relay	3:14.02	7	Did not advance	
