= Czech Republic at the 2025 World Athletics Championships =

- Flag of Czech Republic
- WA code: CZE

in Tokyo, Japan 13 September 2025 – 21 September 2025
- Competitors: 25 (17 men and 8 women)
- Medals Ranked 41st: Gold 0 Silver 0 Bronze 1 Total 1

World Athletics Championships appearances
- 1993; 1995; 1997; 1999; 2001; 2003; 2005; 2007; 2009; 2011; 2013; 2015; 2017; 2019; 2022; 2023; 2025

Czech Republic (as Czechia) competed at the 2025 World Athletics Championships in Tokyo, Japan, from 13 to 21 September 2025.

== Medallists ==
| Medal | Athlete | Event | Date |
|---|---|---|---|
| Bronze | Jan Štefela | Men's high jump | September 16 |

== Results ==
Czech Republic (as Czechia) entered 25 athletes to the championships: 8 women and 17 men.

Key

- Q = Qualified for the next round
- q = Qualified for the next round as a fastest loser or, in field events, by position without achieving the qualifying target
- NR = National record
- PB = Personal best
- SB = Season best
- N/A = Round not applicable for the event

=== Men ===
Track and road events

| Athlete | Event | Heat | | Semifinal | | Final | |
| Athlete | Event | Result | Rank | Result | Rank | Result | Rank |
|---|---|---|---|---|---|---|---|
| Tomáš Němejc | 200 metres | 20.83 | 7 | Did not advance | | | |
| Jakub Dudycha | 800 metres | 1:45.76 | 6 | Did not advance | | | |
| Filip Sasínek | 1500 metres | 3:43.17 | 9 | Did not advance | | | |
| Vít Müller | 400 metres hurdles | 49.02 | 8 | Did not advance | | | |
| Vít Hlaváč | 35 kilometres walk | —N/a | | | | 2:44:08 | 34 |

Field events

| Athlete | Event | Qualification | | Final | |
| Athlete | Event | Distance | Position | Distance | Position |
|---|---|---|---|---|---|
| Jan Štefela | High jump | 2.25 | 5 q | 2.31 | 3rd place, bronze medalist(s) |
| David Holý | Pole vault | 5.70 | 13 | Did not advance | |
| Matěj Ščerba | Pole vault | 5.55 | 18 | Did not advance | |
| Radek Juška | Long jump | 7.93 | 16 | Did not advance | |
| Tomáš Staněk | Shot put | 20.67 | 10 q | 19.91 | 12 |
| Marek Bárta | Discus throw | 57.60 | 32 | Did not advance | |
| Patrik Hájek | Hammer throw | 72.63 | 28 | Did not advance | |
| Volodymyr Myslyvčuk | Hammer throw | 75.69 | 13 | Did not advance | |
| Martin Konečný | Javelin throw | 73.38 | 37 | Did not advance | |
| Jakub Vadlejch | Javelin throw | 84.11 SB | 8 q | 78.71 | 11 |

Combined events – Decathlon

| Athlete | Event | 100 m | LJ | SP | HJ | 400 m | 110H | DT | PV | JT | 1500 m | Final | Rank |
|---|---|---|---|---|---|---|---|---|---|---|---|---|---|
| Ondřej Kopecký | Result | 11.18 | 7.47 | 14.56 | 1.93 | 49.19 | 14.43 | 48.49 | NM | 55.28 | 4:43.98 | 7184 | 15 |
| Ondřej Kopecký | Points | 821 | 927 | 763 | 740 | 852 | 920 | 839 | 0 | 667 | 655 | 7184 | 15 |
| Vilém Stráský | Result | 10.90 | 7.46 | 14.19 | 1.93 | 49.43 | 14.40 | 44.14 | 5.00 | 53.08 | 4:27.04 | 8110 | 11 |
| Vilém Stráský | Points | 883 | 925 | 740 | 740 | 841 | 924 | 749 | 910 | 634 | 764 | 8110 | 11 |

=== Women ===
Track and road events

| Athlete | Event | Heat | | Semifinal | | Final | |
| Athlete | Event | Result | Rank | Result | Rank | Result | Rank |
|---|---|---|---|---|---|---|---|
| Karolína Maňasová | 100 metres | 11.37 | 7 | Did not advance | | | |
| Lada Vondrová | 400 metres | 51.90 | 6 | Did not advance | | | |
| Moira Stewartová | Marathon | —N/a | | | | DNF | |

Field events

| Athlete | Event | Qualification | | Final | |
| Athlete | Event | Distance | Position | Distance | Position |
|---|---|---|---|---|---|
| Michaela Hrubá | High jump | 1.92 | 1 q | 1.88 | 12 |
| Amálie Švábíková | Pole vault | 4.60 | 11 q | 4.75 SB | 4 |
| Linda Suchá | Triple jump | 13.72 | 21 | Did not advance | |
| Petra Sičaková | Javelin | 51.90 | 36 | Did not advance | |
| Andrea Železná | Javelin | 53.43 | 34 | Did not advance | |
