= Yuki Matsushita (hurdler) =

Japanese hurdler (born 1991)

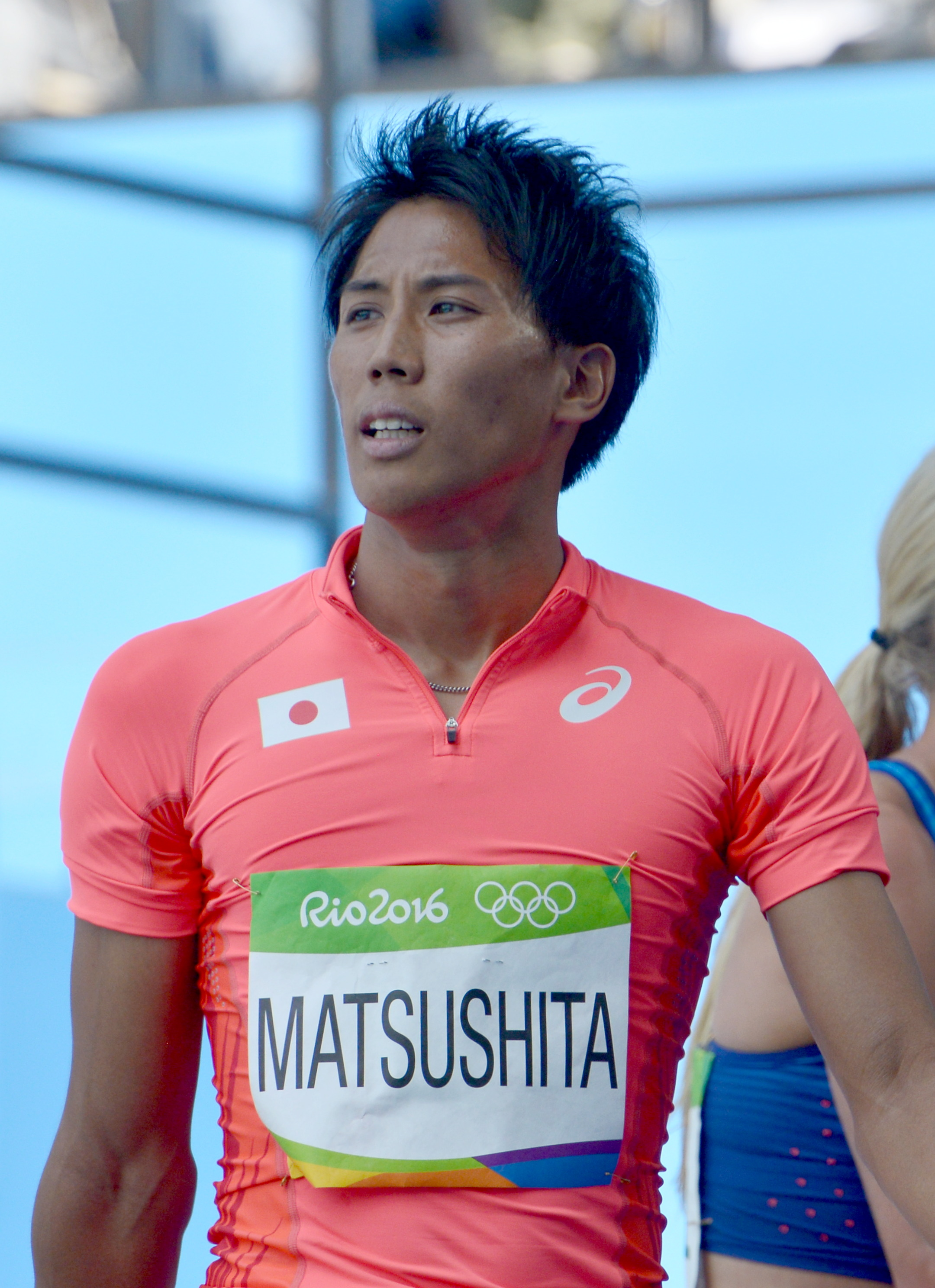
- Matsushita at the 2016 Olympics

Personal information
- Nationality: Japanese
- Born: 9 September 1991 (age 34) Odawara, Japan
- Education: Juntendo University
- Height: 176 cm (5 ft 9 in)
- Weight: 65 kg (143 lb)

Sport
- Country: Japan
- Sport: Athletics
- Event(s): Hurdles, decathlon
- Club: Mizuno Track Club

Achievements and titles
- Personal best(s): 400 m – 48.22 (2013); 400 mH – 49.10 (2016)
- Updated on 19 October 2020

Yuki Matsushita (松下 祐樹, Matsushita Yūki; born 9 September 1991) is a Japanese track and field athlete. He competed in the 400 m hurdles event at the 2015 World Championships He also competed in the 2016 Summer Olympics where he ran 49.60 in the first heat of the 400 m hurdles but did not qualify further.

== International competition ==
Year	Competition	Venue	Position	Event	Time (s)	Notes
Representing Japan
2015	World Championships	Beijing, China	24th (sf)	400 m hurdles	51.10	
2016	Olympic Games	Rio de Janeiro, Brazil	25th (h)	400 m hurdles	49.60	

== National titles ==
- Japanese Championships
  - 400 m hurdles: 2015
