= 2025 World Athletics Championships – Men's decathlon =

Men's decathlon at the 2025 World Athletics Championships
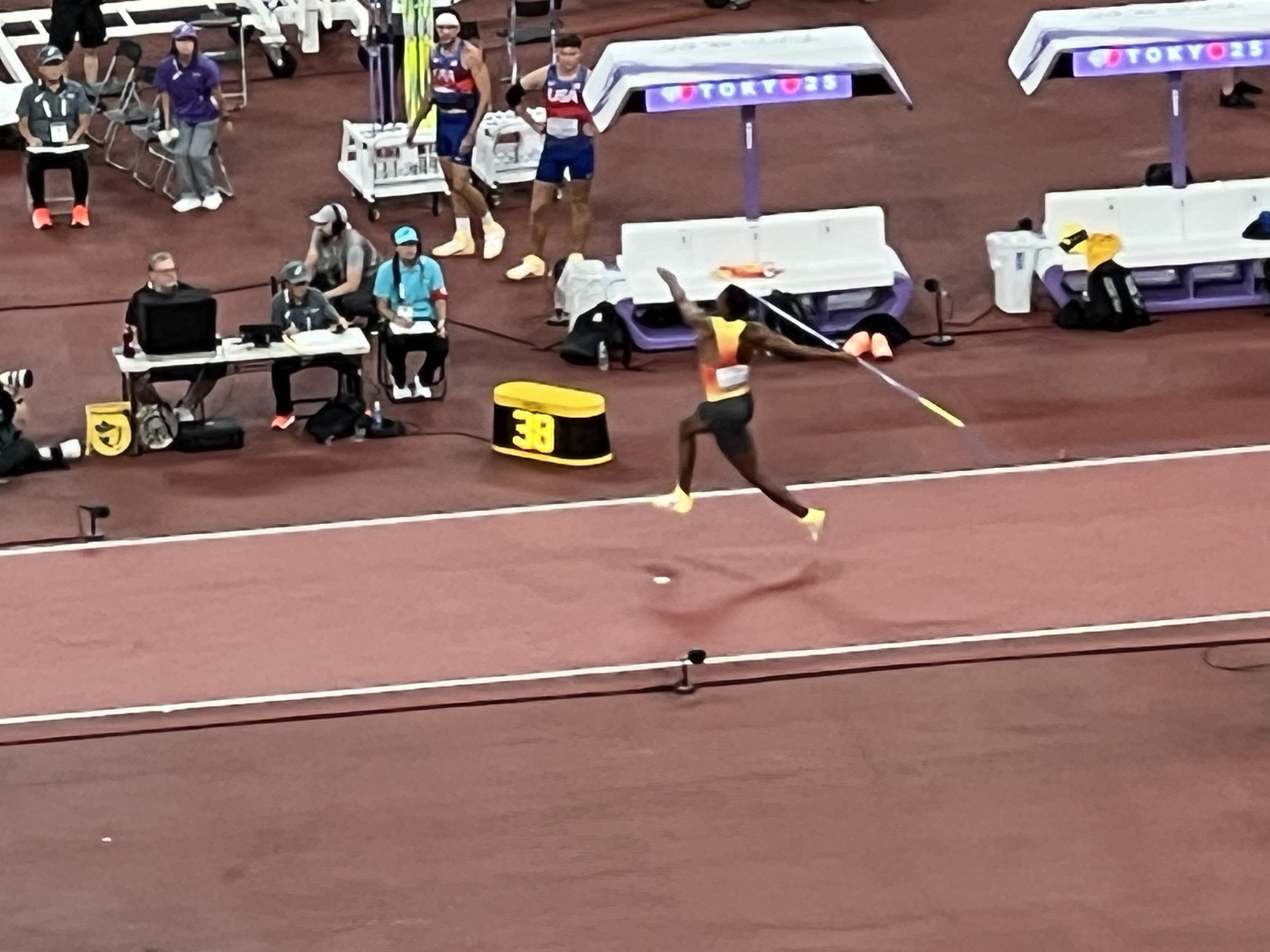
- Leo Neugebauer throws the javelin during the decathlon at the 2025 World Athletics Championships.
- Venue: National Stadium
- Location: Tokyo, Japan
- Dates: 20 and 21 September
- Competitors: 24 from 15 nations
- Winning score: 8804 SB

Medalists
gold medal	Leo Neugebauer	Germany
silver medal	Ayden Owens-Delerme	Puerto Rico
bronze medal	Kyle Garland	United States

The men's decathlon at the 2025 World Athletics Championships was held at the National Stadium in Tokyo on 20 and 21 September 2025.

== Summary ==
The first event of the Decathlon, the 100 metre sprint, was won by Ayden Owens-Delerme of Puerto Rico. Kyle Garland of the United States took the lead after the long jump with a jump of 7.92 metres, and held onto the lead for the following six events. In the hurdles, Sander Skotheim, who was world leader at the time, was disqualified; following this he withdrew from the competition. As Garland performed well in the hurdles, this left him over 300 points clear of his closest rival, Leo Neugebauer of Germany. However, Neugebauer outperformed Garland in the following three events, and took the lead following the Javelin throw. In the final event, the 1500 metres, Owens-Delerme finished second in the field, leading to him overtaking Garland and moving into second place. This left him 20 points shy of Neugerbauer's total, confirming the latter as the winner.

== Records ==
Before the competition records were as follows:

Record	Athlete & Nat.	Perf.	Location	Date
World record	Kevin Mayer (FRA)	9126 pts	Talence, France	16 September 2018
Championship record	Ashton Eaton (USA)	9045 pts	Beijing, China	29 August 2015
World Leading	Sander Skotheim (NOR)	8909 pts	Götzis, Austria	1 June 2025
African Record	Larbi Bourrada (ALG)	8521 pts	Rio de Janeiro, Brazil	18 August 2016
Asian Record	Dmitriy Karpov (KAZ)	8725 pts	Athens, Greece	24 August 2004
European Record	Kevin Mayer (FRA)	9126 pts	Talence, France	16 September 2018
North, Central American and Caribbean record	Ashton Eaton (USA)	9045 pts	Beijing, China	29 August 2015
Oceanian Record	Ashley Moloney (AUS)	8649 pts	Tokyo, Japan	5 August 2021
South American Record	Carlos Chinin (BRA)	8393 pts	São Paulo, Brazil	8 June 2013

== Qualification standard ==
The standard to qualify automatically for entry was 8550 points.

== Schedule ==
The event schedule, in local time (UTC+9), was as follows:

Date	Time	Round
20 September	09:28	100 metres
20 September	10:15	Long jump
20 September	11:45	Shot put
20 September	19:05	High jump
20 September	21:55	400 metres
21 September	09:05	110 metres hurdles
21 September	09:55	Discus throw
21 September	11:35	Pole vault
21 September	17:35	Javelin throw
21 September	20:49	1500 metres

== Results ==
=== Final standings ===
The final standings were as follows

The highest mark recorded in each event is highlighted in yellow

Rank	Athlete	Nationality	100m	LJ	SP	HJ	400m	110mh	DT	PV	JT	1500m	Total	Notes
1st place, gold medalist(s)	Leo Neugebauer	Germany	10.80	7.62 m	16.70 m	1.99 m	48.27	14.80	56.15 m	5.10 m	64.34 m	4:31.89	8804	SB
2nd place, silver medalist(s)	Ayden Owens-Delerme	Puerto Rico	10.31	7.32 m	15.55 m	1.96 m	46.46	13.65	46.12 m	5.10 m	58.79 m	4:17.91	8784	NR
3rd place, bronze medalist(s)	Kyle Garland	United States	10.51	7.92 m	17.02 m	2.11 m	48.73	14.30	48.06 m	4.80 m	59.78 m	4:45.45	8703	
4	Niklas Kaul	Germany	11.34	7.21 m	14.58 m	2.05 m	48.13	14.45	47.29 m	4.70 m	78.19 m	4:20.76	8538	
5	Johannes Erm	Estonia	10.78	7.63 m	15.18 m	1.96 m	47.51	14.52	45.21 m	5.10 m	56.32 m	4:29.15	8431	SB
6	Heath Baldwin	United States	11.01	7.26 m	15.33 m	2.08 m	48.44	14.16	41.01 m	4.80 m	65.24 m	4:33.42	8337	
7	Harrison Williams	United States	10.79	6.88 m	14.87 m	1.90 m	46.88	14.56	45.61 m	5.20 m	55.44 m	4:22.72	8269	SB
8	Kendrick Thompson	Bahamas	10.67	7.54 m	12.56 m	2.02 m	47.93	14.15	36.10 m	4.60 m	68.02 m	4:32.26	8175	
9	Makenson Gletty	France	10.92	6.98 m	15.31 m	1.96 m	50.49	14.06	42.00 m	4.90 m	62.89 m	4:27.90	8146	
10	Jente Hauttekeete	Belgium	10.85	7.04 m	14.58 m	1.99 m	49.36	14.49	44.09 m	5.00 m	55.44 m	4:27.91	8116	
11	Vilém Stráský	Czech Republic	10.90	7.46 m	14.19 m	1.93 m	49.43	14.40	44.14 m	5.00 m	53.08 m	4:27.04	8110	
12	Antoine Ferranti	France	11.19	7.23 m	13.60 m	2.05 m	48.64	14.78	43.04 m	4.60 m	53.06 m	4:13.52	8003	
13	José Fernando Ferreira	Brazil	10.94	7.08 m	13.74 m	1.90 m	49.78	13.85	44.88 m	4.80 m	64.23 m	4:59.87	7927	SB
14	Fei Xiang	China	11.12	7.16 m	13.45 m	1.90 m	50.19	14.71	40.57 m	4.80 m	41.71 m	4:58.39	7347	
15	Ondřej Kopecký	Czech Republic	11.18	7.47 m	14.56 m	1.93 m	49.19	14.43	48.49 m	NM	55.28 m	4:43.98	7184	
16	Karel Tilga	Estonia	11.02	7.31 m	15.78 m	NM	48.64	14.99	50.61 m	NM	69.33 m	DNF	6073	
	Lindon Victor	Grenada	10.60	7.01 m	14.73 m	1.93 m	48.80	14.92	52.34 m	NM	DNS		DNF	
	Sander Skotheim	Norway	10.91	7.97 m	14.50 m	2.14 m	47.86	DQ	DNS				DNF	
	Pierce LePage	Canada	10.84	6.92 m	14.87 m	1.96 m	DNS						DNF	
	Simon Ehammer	Switzerland	10.66	7.97 m	14.28 m	NM	DNS						DNF	
	Sven Roosen	Netherlands	10.72	7.26 m	14.93 m	NM	DNS						DNF	
	Till Steinforth	Germany	11.16	7.07 m	13.73 m	DNS							DNF	
	Janek Õiglane	Estonia	11.16	6.61 m	13.71 m	DNS							DNF	
	Damian Warner	Canada											DNS	

=== 100 metres ===
The 100 metres event was started on 20 September at 09:28.

Heat	1	2	3
Start time	09:28	09:35	09:42
Wind (m/s)	-0.4	+0.1	+0.2

Rank	Heat	Name	Nationality	Time	Points	Notes
1	3	Ayden Owens-Delerme	Puerto Rico	10.31	1020	SB
2	3	Kyle Garland	United States	10.51	973	
3	3	Lindon Victor	Grenada	10.60	952	
4	3	Simon Ehammer	Switzerland	10.66	938	
5	3	Kendrick Thompson	Bahamas	10.67	935	
6	2	Sven Roosen	Netherlands	10.72	924	SB
7	1	Johannes Erm	Estonia	10.78	910	SB
8	3	Harrison Williams	United States	10.79	908	
9	2	Leo Neugebauer	Germany	10.80	906	
10	2	Pierce Lepage	Canada	10.84	897	
11	3	Jente Hauttekeete	Belgium	10.85	894	
12	2	Vilém Stráský	Czech Republic	10.90	883	
13	2	Sander Skotheim	Norway	10.91	881	
14	1	Makenson Gletty	France	10.92	878	
15	2	José Fernando Ferreira	Brazil	10.94	874	
16	2	Heath Baldwin	United States	11.01	858	
17	1	Karel Tilga	Estonia	11.02	856	
18	1	Fei Xiang	China	11.12	834	SB
19	1	Janek Õiglane	Estonia	11.16	825	SB
20	2	Till Steinforth	Germany	11.16	825	
21	1	Ondřej Kopecký	Czech Republic	11.18	821	
22	1	Antoine Ferranti	France	11.19	819	PB
23	1	Niklas Kaul	Germany	11.34	786	
—	3	Damian Warner	Canada		DNS	

=== Long jump ===
The long jump event was started on 20 September at 10:15.

Rank	Group	Name	Nationality	Round			Result	Points	Notes	Overall	
Rank	Group	Name	Nationality	1	2	3	Result	Points	Notes	Pts	Rank
1	A	Simon Ehammer	Switzerland	7.97	x	7.97	7.97	1053		1991	2
2	A	Sander Skotheim	Norway	x	7.97	x	7.97	1053		1934	3
3	A	Kyle Garland	United States	x	x	7.92	7.92	1040	SB	2013	1
4	A	Johannes Erm	Estonia	7.63	x	7.56	7.63	967		1877	6
5	A	Leo Neugebauer	Germany	x	7.50	7.62	7.62	965		1871	7
6	A	Kendrick Thompson	Bahamas	7.54	7.47	7.42	7.54	945		1880	5
7	A	Ondřej Kopecký	Czech Republic	x	7.47	7.35	7.47	927		1748	11
8	B	Vilém Stráský	Czech Republic	7.11	7.18	7.46	7.46	925	SB	1808	8
9	A	Ayden Owens-Delerme	Puerto Rico	7.16	7.32	x	7.32	891		1911	4
10	A	Karel Tilga	Estonia	7.31	7.27	7.06	7.31	888	SB	1744	12
11	B	Heath Baldwin	United States	7.26	7.07	x	7.26	876		1734	13
12	B	Sven Roosen	Netherlands	6.95	x	7.26	7.26	876	SB	1800	9
13	B	Antoine Ferranti	France	7.20	7.11	7.23	7.23	869		1688	18
14	B	Niklas Kaul	Germany	7.21	7.13	7.03	7.21	864		1650	22
15	B	Fei Xiang	China	7.05	7.16	x	7.16	852		1686	20
16	B	José Fernando Ferreira	Brazil	7.00	6.87	7.08	7.08	833		1707	15
17	A	Till Steinforth	Germany	6.97	6.84	7.07	7.07	830		1655	21
18	B	Jente Hauttekeete	Belgium	6.97	6.80	7.04	7.04	823		1717	14
19	B	Lindon Victor	Grenada	6.93	x	7.01	7.01	816		1768	10
20	B	Makenson Gletty	France	x	x	6.98	6.98	809		1687	19
21	B	Pierce Lepage	Canada	6.86	x	6.92	6.92	795		1692	17
22	A	Harrison Williams	United States	x	6.69	6.88	6.88	785	SB	1693	16
23	B	Janek Õiglane	Estonia	x	x	6.61	6.61	723	SB	1548	23
—	A	Damian Warner	Canada					DNS		DNS	

=== Shot put ===
The shot put event was started on 20 September at 11:45.

Rank	Group	Name	Nationality	Round			Result	Points	Notes	Overall	
Rank	Group	Name	Nationality	1	2	3	Result	Points	Notes	Pts	Rank
1	A	Kyle Garland	United States	17.02	16.43	16.33	17.02	914	PB	2927	1
2	A	Leo Neugebauer	Germany	16.37	16.70	16.26	16.70	894	SB	2765	2
3	A	Karel Tilga	Estonia	15.11	15.78	15.64	15.78	838		2582	8
4	A	Ayden Owens-Delerme	Puerto Rico	15.53	15.55	15.42	15.55	824		2735	4
5	A	Heath Baldwin	United States	13.03	15.33	15.03	15.33	810		2544	10
6	A	Makenson Gletty	France	15.31	15.23	x	15.31	809		2496	14
7	A	Johannes Erm	Estonia	14.46	14.93	15.18	15.18	801		2678	6
8	B	Sven Roosen	Netherlands	14.93	x	14.78	14.93	785	SB	2585	7
9	A	Harrison Williams	United States	14.50	x	14.87	14.87	782		2475	16
10	A	Pierce Lepage	Canada	14.50	x	14.87	14.87	782		2474	17
11	B	Lindon Victor	Grenada	13.84	14.45	14.73	14.73	773		2541	11
12	A	Jente Hauttekeete	Belgium	14.42	14.58	13.99	14.58	764		2481	15
13	B	Niklas Kaul	Germany	14.58	14.14	14.22	14.58	764		2414	19
14	B	Ondřej Kopecký	Czech Republic	14.37	14.24	14.56	14.56	763	SB	2511	13
15	B	Sander Skotheim	Norway	14.42	14.23	14.50	14.50	759		2693	5
16	B	Simon Ehammer	Switzerland	14.28	14.25	x	14.28	745		2736	3
17	B	Vilém Stráský	Czech Republic	14.19	x	x	14.19	740		2548	9
18	B	José Fernando Ferreira	Brazil	x	13.27	13.74	13.74	712		2419	18
19	A	Till Steinforth	Germany	12.87	13.63	13.73	13.73	712		2367	22
20	B	Janek Õiglane	Estonia	x	13.71	x	13.71	711	SB	2259	23
21	B	Antoine Ferranti	France	13.60	13.21	13.51	13.60	704		2392	20
22	B	Fei Xiang	China	13.28	12.81	13.45	13.45	695	SB	2381	21
23	B	Kendrick Thompson	Bahamas	x	12.33	12.56	12.56	640	SB	2520	12
—	A	Damian Warner	Canada					DNS		DNF	

=== High jump ===
The high jump event was started on 20 September at 19:05.

Rnk	Grp	Athlete	Nationality	1.78	1.81	1.84	1.87	1.90	1.93	1.96	1.99	2.02	2.05	2.08	2.11	2.14	2.17	Res	Pts	Nts	Overall	
Rnk	Grp	Athlete	Nationality	1.78	1.81	1.84	1.87	1.90	1.93	1.96	1.99	2.02	2.05	2.08	2.11	2.14	2.17	Res	Pts	Nts	Pts	Rnk
1	A	Sander Skotheim	Norway	–	–	–	–	–	–	–	o	–	o	xo	xxo	xo	xxx	2.14	934		3627	2
2	A	Kyle Garland	United States	–	–	–	–	–	o	o	o	o	o	o	o	xxx		2.11	906		3833	1
3	A	Heath Baldwin	United States	–	–	–	–	–	–	–	o	xo	o	xo	xxx			2.08	878		3422	6
4	A	Niklas Kaul	Germany	–	–	–	–	–	–	o	o	xo	o	r				2.05	850	SB	3264	11
5	A	Antoine Ferranti	France	–	–	–	–	–	–	o	–	o	xo	xxx				2.05	850		3242	14
6	B	Kendrick Thompson	Bahamas	–	–	–	o	–	o	o	o	o	xxx					2.02	822	PB	3342	7
7	A	Jente Hauttekeete	Belgium	–	–	–	–	o	–	o	o	xxx						1.99	794		3275	10
8	B	Leo Neugebauer	Germany	–	–	–	o	o	o	o	xxo	xxx						1.99	794		3559	3
9	A	Pierce Lepage	Canada	–	–	–	–	o	o	o	xxx							1.96	767		3241	15
10	A	Makenson Gletty	France	–	–	–	–	–	xo	o	xxx							1.96	767		3263	12
11	A	Johannes Erm	Estonia	–	–	–	o	xo	o	o	xxx							1.96	767		3445	5
12	B	Ayden Owens-Delerme	Puerto Rico	–	–	xo	o	o	xo	xo	xxx							1.96	767		3502	4
13	B	Vilém Stráský	Czech Republic	–	o	–	o	o	xo	xxx								1.93	740		3288	8
14	B	Ondřej Kopecký	Czech Republic	–	–	–	o	o	xxo	xxx								1.93	740	SB	3251	13
15	B	Lindon Victor	Grenada	–	–	–	xxo	xo	xxo	xxx								1.93	740	SB	3281	9
16	B	Fei Xiang	China	–	o	o	o	o	xxx									1.90	714		3095	18
17	B	José Fernando Ferreira	Brazil	–	o	xo	xo	o	xxx									1.90	714		3133	17
18	B	Harrison Williams	United States	–	–	xo	o	xxo	xxx									1.90	714		3189	16
—	B	Karel Tilga	Estonia	–	–	–	–	xxx										NM			DNF	
—	B	Sven Roosen	Netherlands	–	xxx													NM			DNF	
—	A	Simon Ehammer	Switzerland	–	–	–	–	–	xxx									NM			DNF	
—	A	Till Steinforth	Germany																DNS		DNF	
—	B	Janek Õiglane	Estonia																DNS		DNF	

=== 400 metres ===
The 400 metres event was started on 20 September at 21:55.

Rank	Heat	Athlete	Nationality	Result	Points	Notes	Overall	
Rank	Heat	Athlete	Nationality	Result	Points	Notes	Pts	Rank
1	3	Ayden Owens-Delerme	Puerto Rico	46.46	985		4487	3
2	3	Harrison Williams	United States	46.88	964		4153	9
3	3	Johannes Erm	Estonia	47.51	933	SB	4378	5
4	3	Sander Skotheim	Norway	47.86	916		4543	2
5	3	Kendrick Thompson	Bahamas	47.93	913	SB	4255	7
6	2	Niklas Kaul	Germany	48.13	903	SB	4167	8
7	3	Leo Neugebauer	Germany	48.27	896		4455	4
8	2	Heath Baldwin	United States	48.44	888		4310	6
9	2	Antoine Ferranti	France	48.64	878	PB	4120	12
10	1	Karel Tilga	Estonia	48.64	878	SB	3460	18
11	2	Kyle Garland	United States	48.73	874	SB	4707	1
12	1	Lindon Victor	Grenada	48.80	871	SB	4152	10
13	1	Ondřej Kopecký	Czech Republic	49.19	852	SB	4103	14
14	2	Jente Hauttekeete	Belgium	49.36	844		4119	13
15	2	Vilém Stráský	Czech Republic	49.43	841		4129	11
16	1	José Fernando Ferreira	Brazil	49.78	825	SB	3958	16
17	2	Fei Xiang	China	50.19	806		3901	17
18	1	Makenson Gletty	France	50.49	792		4055	15
—	1	Pierce Lepage	Canada		DNS		DNF	
—	1	Sven Roosen	Netherlands		DNS		DNF	
—	3	Simon Ehammer	Switzerland		DNS		DNF	

=== 110 metres hurdles ===
The 110 metres hurdles event was started on 21 September at 09:05.

Rank	Heat	Athlete	Nationality	Result	Points	Notes	Overall	
Rank	Heat	Athlete	Nationality	Result	Points	Notes	Pts	Rank
1	3	Ayden Owens-Delerme	Puerto Rico	13.65	1020	SB	5507	2
2	3	José Fernando Ferreira	Brazil	13.85	994	PB	4952	15
3	2	Makenson Gletty	France	14.06	967	SB	5022	12
4	2	Kendrick Thompson	Bahamas	14.15	955	PB	5210	6
5	3	Heath Baldwin	United States	14.16	954		5264	5
6	3	Kyle Garland	United States	14.30	936		5643	1
7	3	Vilém Stráský	Czech Republic	14.40	924		5053	9
8	2	Ondřej Kopecký	Czech Republic	14.43	920		5023	11
9	1	Niklas Kaul	Germany	14.45	917	SB	5084	7
10	3	Jente Hauttekeete	Belgium	14.49	912		5031	10
11	2	Johannes Erm	Estonia	14.52	908		5286	4
12	1	Harrison Williams	United States	14.56	903	SB	5056	8
13	1	Fei Xiang	China	14.71	885		4786	16
14	1	Antoine Ferranti	France	14.78	876		4996	14
15	2	Leo Neugebauer	Germany	14.80	874		5329	3
16	1	Lindon Victor	Grenada	14.92	859	SB	5011	13
17	1	Karel Tilga	Estonia	14.99	851		4311	18
—	2	Sander Skotheim	Norway	DQ	0		4543	17

=== Discus throw ===
The discus throw event was started on 21 September at 09:55.

Rank	Group	Name	Nationality	Round			Result	Points	Notes	Overall	
Rank	Group	Name	Nationality	1	2	3	Result	Points	Notes	Pts	Rank
1	A	Leo Neugebauer	Germany	54.52	55.16	56.15	56.15	999	CDB	6328	2
2	B	Lindon Victor	Grenada	51.99	52.34	x	52.34	919	SB	5930	6
3	B	Karel Tilga	Estonia	46.89	50.61	x	50.61	883		5194	17
4	A	Ondřej Kopecký	Czech Republic	40.86	47.55	48.49	48.49	839		5862	8
5	B	Kyle Garland	United States	x	48.06	x	48.06	830		6473	1
6	B	Niklas Kaul	Germany	44.14	45.94	47.29	47.29	814		5898	7
7	B	Ayden Owens-Delerme	Puerto Rico	45.73	44.35	46.12	46.12	790		6297	3
8	A	Harrison Williams	United States	43.48	42.34	45.61	45.61	779		5835	9
9	A	Johannes Erm	Estonia	45.21	43.57	42.80	45.21	771		6057	4
10	A	José Fernando Ferreira	Brazil	43.62	44.88	44.63	44.88	764		5716	15
11	A	Vilém Stráský	Czech Republic	38.00	41.06	44.14	44.14	749	PB	5802	10
12	A	Jente Hauttekeete	Belgium	42.40	44.09	43.97	44.09	748		5779	12
13	A	Antoine Ferranti	France	x	43.04	41.74	43.04	727		5723	14
14	B	Makenson Gletty	France	41.83	x	42.00	42.00	705		5727	13
15	B	Heath Baldwin	United States	36.79	39.21	41.01	41.01	685	SB	5949	5
16	B	Fei Xiang	China	39.94	x	40.57	40.57	676		5462	16
17	B	Kendrick Thompson	Bahamas	32.36	35.34	36.10	36.10	586		5796	11
—	A	Sander Skotheim	Norway					DNS		DNF	

=== Pole vault ===
The pole vault event was started on 21 September at 11:55.

Rnk	Grp	Athlete	Nationality	4.20	4.30	4.40	4.50	4.60	4.70	4.80	4.90	5.00	5.10	5.20	5.30	Res	Pts	Nts	Overall	
Rnk	Grp	Athlete	Nationality	4.20	4.30	4.40	4.50	4.60	4.70	4.80	4.90	5.00	5.10	5.20	5.30	Res	Pts	Nts	Pts	Rnk
1	A	Harrison Williams	United States	–	–	–	–	–	–	–	o	xo	xo	xxo	xxx	5.20	972	SB	6807	5
2	A	Johannes Erm	Estonia	–	–	–	–	–	o	–	o	o	o	xxx		5.10	941		6998	4
3	B	Ayden Owens-Delerme	Puerto Rico	–	–	–	o	o	o	o	o	xo	o	xxx		5.10	941	PB	7238	3
4	A	Leo Neugebauer	Germany	–	–	–	–	–	xo	o	o	xxo	xxo	xxx		5.10	941	SB	7269	2
5	A	Vilém Stráský	Czech Republic	–	–	–	–	–	xxo	o	o	xo	xxx			5.00	910	PB	6712	8
6	A	Jente Hauttekeete	Belgium	–	–	–	–	–	–	o	xxo	xo	xxx			5.00	910		6689	9
7	B	Makenson Gletty	France	–	–	–	–	–	o	–	xo	xxx				4.90	880	SB	6607	10
8	A	José Fernando Ferreira	Brazil	–	–	–	–	–	xo	o	xxx					4.80	849		6565	12
9	B	Heath Baldwin	United States	–	–	o	o	o	o	xo	xxx					4.80	849		6798	6
10	B	Kyle Garland	United States	–	–	o	o	o	o	xo	xxx					4.80	849		7322	1
11	B	Fei Xiang	China	–	–	–	–	xo	o	xxo	xxx					4.80	849	SB	6311	14
12	B	Niklas Kaul	Germany	–	–	–	–	o	o	xxx						4.70	819		6717	7
13	B	Antoine Ferranti	France	–	–	–	–	o	–	xxx						4.60	790		6513	13
14	B	Kendrick Thompson	Bahamas	–	–	o	–	xo	xxx							4.60	790	PB	6586	11
–	B	Karel Tilga	Estonia	–	–	–	xxx									NM			DNF	
–	B	Lindon Victor	Grenada	–	–	–	x–	r								NM			DNF	
–	A	Ondřej Kopecký	Czech Republic	–	–	–	–	–	xxx							NM			DNF	

=== Javelin throw ===
The javelin throw event was started on 21 September at 17:35.

Rank	Group	Name	Nationality	Round			Result	Points	Notes	Overall	
Rank	Group	Name	Nationality	1	2	3	Result	Points	Notes	Pts	Rank
1	B	Niklas Kaul	Germany	78.19	76.29	72.71	78.19	1015	SB	7732	4
2	A	Karel Tilga	Estonia	69.33	r		69.33	879		6073	16
3	A	Kendrick Thompson	Bahamas	68.02	66.17	65.91	68.02	859	PB	7445	8
4	B	Heath Baldwin	United States	65.24	63.99	64.08	65.24	817		7615	6
5	B	Leo Neugebauer	Germany	x	61.00	64.34	64.34	803	PB	8072	1
6	A	José Fernando Ferreira	Brazil	64.23	64.11	x	64.23	802		7367	10
7	A	Makenson Gletty	France	57.75	60.96	62.89	62.89	781	PB	7388	9
8	B	Kyle Garland	United States	59.78	x	59.60	59.78	735		8057	2
9	B	Ayden Owens-Delerme	Puerto Rico	58.79	57.88	x	58.79	720	SB	7958	3
10	B	Johannes Erm	Estonia	56.32	x	x	56.32	683	SB	7681	5
11	A	Jente Hauttekeete	Belgium	54.05	55.44	53.87	55.44	669		7358	11
12	B	Harrison Williams	United States	53.98	55.44	53.53	55.44	669	SB	7476	7
13	A	Ondřej Kopecký	Czech Republic	54.82	55.28	52.06	55.28	667		6529	15
14	A	Vilém Stráský	Czech Republic	47.21	49.42	53.08	53.08	634		7346	12
15	A	Antoine Ferranti	France	52.41	52.26	53.06	53.06	634		7147	13
16	A	Fei Xiang	China	41.71	r		41.71	467		6778	14
—	A	Lindon Victor	Grenada					DNS		DNF	

=== 1500 metres ===
The 1500 metres event was started on 21 September at 20:49.

Rank	Athlete	Nationality	Result	Points	Notes	Overall	
Rank	Athlete	Nationality	Result	Points	Notes	Pts	Rank
1	Antoine Ferranti	France	4:13.52	856	PB	8003	12
2	Ayden Owens-Delerme	Puerto Rico	4:17.91	826	SB	8784	2
3	Niklas Kaul	Germany	4:20.76	806		8538	4
4	Harrison Williams	United States	4:22.72	793	SB	8269	7
5	Vilém Stráský	Czech Republic	4:27.04	764		8110	11
6	Makenson Gletty	France	4:27.90	758		8146	9
7	Jente Hauttekeete	Belgium	4:27.91	758	PB	8116	10
8	Johannes Erm	Estonia	4:29.15	750	SB	8431	5
9	Leo Neugebauer	Germany	4:31.89	732	PB	8804	1
10	Kendrick Thompson	Bahamas	4:32.26	730	PB	8175	8
11	Heath Baldwin	United States	4:33.42	722	PB	8337	6
12	Ondřej Kopecký	Czech Republic	4:43.98	655		7184	15
13	Kyle Garland	United States	4:45.45	646	SB	8703	3
14	Fei Xiang	China	4:58.39	569		7347	14
15	José Fernando Ferreira	Brazil	4:59.87	560	SB	7927	13
—	Karel Tilga	Estonia		DNF			
