= Puerto Rico at the 2009 World Championships in Athletics =

Puerto Rico competed in Berlin

- WA code: PUR

in Berlin
- Competitors: 5
- Medals: Gold 0 Silver 1 Bronze 0 Total 1

World Championships in Athletics appearances
- 1983; 1987; 1991; 1993; 1995; 1997; 1999; 2001; 2003; 2005; 2007; 2009; 2011; 2013; 2015; 2017; 2019; 2022; 2023; 2025

Puerto Rico competed at the 2009 World Championships in Athletics from 15 to 23 August. A team of 5 athletes was announced in preparation for the competition. Selected athletes had achieved one of the competition's qualifying standards.

== Team selection ==
Track and road events

Event	Athletes	
Event	Men	Women
100 metres		Carol Rodríguez
200 metres		Carol Rodríguez
400 metres	Héctor Carrasquillo	
110 metre hurdles	Héctor Cotto	—
400 metre hurdles	Javier Culson	
