= Puerto Rico at the 2015 World Championships in Athletics =

- WA code: PUR

in Beijing
- Competitors: 3
- Medals: Gold 0 Silver 0 Bronze 0 Total 0

World Championships in Athletics appearances
- 1983; 1987; 1991; 1993; 1995; 1997; 1999; 2001; 2003; 2005; 2007; 2009; 2011; 2013; 2015; 2017; 2019; 2022; 2023; 2025

Puerto Rico competed at the 2015 World Championships in Athletics in Beijing, China, from 22 to 30 August 2015.

== Results ==
(q – qualified, NM – no mark, SB – season best)

=== Men ===
Track and road events

Athlete	Event	Heat		Semifinal		Final	
Athlete	Event	Result	Rank	Result	Rank	Result	Rank
Eric Alejandro	400 metres hurdles	49.94	32	did not advance			
Javier Culson	400 metres hurdles	49.02	10 Q	49.36	18	did not advance	

=== Women ===
Track and road events

Athlete	Event	Heat		Semifinal		Final	
Athlete	Event	Result	Rank	Result	Rank	Result	Rank
Celiangeli Morales	200 metres	23.34	39	did not advance			
