= Ayden Owens-Delerme =

Stateside Puerto Rican athlete (born 2000)

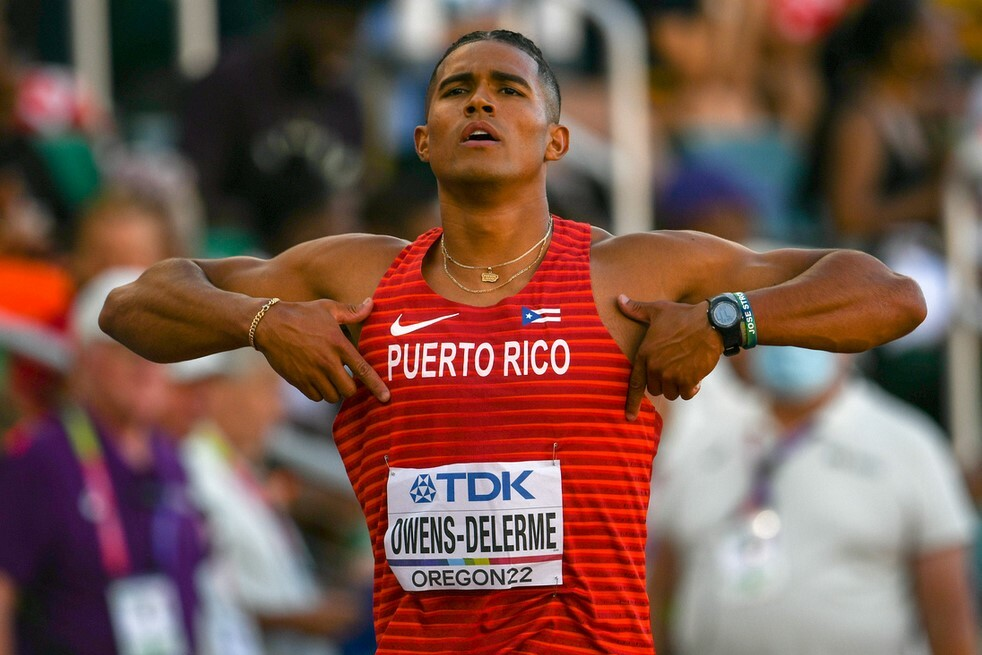
- Ayden Owens-Delerme at the 2022 World Athletics Championships

Personal information
- Born: Ayden Owens-Delerme; 28 May 2000 (age 26) Pittsburgh, United States
- Height: 6 ft 0 in (184 cm)

Sport
- Country: Puerto Rico
- Sport: Track and field
- Event: Decathlon
- College team: Arkansas Razorbacks; Michigan Wolverines; USC Trojans
- Coached by: Petros Kyprianou

Achievements and titles
- Personal bests: Decathlon: 8,784 (2025) NR; Heptathlon: 6,518 (2023) NR
Medal record
Men's athletics
Representing Puerto Rico
World Championships
Silver medal – second place	2025 Tokyo	Decathlon
Central American and Caribbean Games
Gold medal – first place	2023 San Salvador	Decathlon

Ayden Owens-Delerme (born 28 May 2000) is a Stateside Puerto Rican decathlete. He won a silver medal at the 2025 World Athletics Championships.

== Early life ==
Born in Pittsburgh, Pennsylvania, Owens-Delerme was first recognised as a multi-sport athlete at statewide athletic powerhouse North Allegheny in suburban Wexford. Michael Owens, Ayden Owens-Delerme's father, captained the 1980 basketball team at the University of Virginia.

== High school ==
Owens-Delerme was the 2018 PIAA state champion in the 110 meters hurdles, 300 meters hurdles, and 200 meters dash. Additionally, he finished second in the long jump. By winning three events and finishing second in another, he single-handedly won the state title for North Allegheny.

Owens-Delerme was a four-time New Balance National All-American, won the 2018 New Balance indoor 60-meter hurdles title with a state-record time of 7.59, and decathlon champion at the 2017 New Balance Nationals Outdoor. These accomplishments made him the 2018 Gatorade Pennsylvania Men's Track and Field Athlete of the Year. Owens-Delerme concluded his prep career ranked in the Top 10 nationally in seven different track events.

== NCAA ==
Owens-Delerme first attended the University of Southern California, where he was named 2019 Pac-12 Freshman of the Year. He then transferred to the University of Michigan, where he earned the 2021 Big Ten Field Athlete of the Year Award, before transferring to the University of Arkansas, for whom he won the 2022 NCAA championship decathlon, following which he was named the 2022 SEC Field Athlete of the Year. Owens-Delerme graduated from the University of Michigan in 2021 and the University of Arkansas in 2023.

Owens-Delerme finished his collegiate career as a 9-time All-American, 3-time NCAA Champion, 2-time Southeastern Conference Champion, 1-time Big Ten Conference Champion, 1-time Pac-12 Conference Champion, and 17-time All-Conference finalist.

== Professional career ==
Despite being born and raised in Pennsylvania, Owens-Delerme represents the U.S. territory of Puerto Rico on the international stage, as his family on his mother's side are Puerto Rican, and he visited the island yearly in his childhood.

Competing at the 2022 World Athletics Championships decathlon in Eugene, Oregon, Owens-Delerme was placed third overall after the 100 metres, shot put and long jump events and took the lead overnight after a personal best 45.07 in the 400m. After subpar second-day performances in the javelin and pole vault, he fell behind eventual champion Kevin Mayer and others, eventually finishing 4th.

He competed in Paris at the 2024 Summer Olympics in the decathlon, finishing in ninth place after winning the decathlon at Mt. SAC Relays and setting a Central American and Caribbean record, scoring 8,732 points.

He finished seventh at the Hypo-Meeting in Götzis on 1 June 2025 with a tally of 8,486 points, setting a meeting record time for the 400 metres. He won the 2025 Décastar decathlon in Talence, France, scoring 8,478 points.

Owens-Delerme won a silver medal at the 2025 World Athletics Championships in Tokyo, setting a new national record of 8,784 points, becoming the third Puerto Rican after Javier Culson and Jasmine Camacho-Quinn to win a world championship medal. He also placed third overall in the season-long World Athletics Combined Events Tour for 2025.

== Competition record ==
Collegiate

Year	Competition	Venue	Position	Event	Notes
Representing University of Arkansas
2023	NCAA Outdoor T&F Championships	University of Texas at Austin	8th	4 × 400 m relay	3:03.66
2023	NCAA Outdoor T&F Championships	University of Texas at Austin	10th	400m hurdles	49.82
2023	SEC Outdoor T&F Championships	Louisiana State University	1st	400m hurdles	48.26
2023	NCAA Indoor T&F Championships	Albuquerque Convention Center	2nd	Heptathlon	6,518 points
2023	NCAA Indoor T&F Championships	Albuquerque Convention Center	1st	4 × 400 m relay	3:02.09
2023	SEC Indoor T&F Championships	University of Arkansas	1st	Heptathlon	6,237 points
2022	NCAA Outdoor T&F Championships	University of Oregon	1st	Decathlon	8,457 points
2022	SEC Outdoor T&F Championships	Texas A&M University	7th	4 × 400 m relay	3:06.83
2022	SEC Outdoor T&F Championships	Texas A&M University	5th	110m hurdles	13.84
2022	SEC Outdoor T&F Championships	Texas A&M University	2nd	4 × 100 m relay	39.24
2022	Mt SAC Relays	Mt SAC	1st	Decathlon	8,528 points CR
2022	NCAA Indoor T&F Championships	Birmingham CrossPlex	1st	Heptathlon	6,211 points
2022	SEC Indoor T&F Championships	Texas A&M University	5th	60m hurdles	7.89
Representing University of Michigan
2021	NCAA Outdoor T&F Championships	University of Oregon	2nd	Decathlon	8,114 points
2021	Big 10 Outdoor T&F Championships	University of Illinois	1st	Decathlon	8,238 points
2021	NCAA Indoor T&F Championships	University of Arkansas	3rd	Heptathlon	5,995 points
2021	Big 10 Indoor T&F Championships	SPIRE Institute - Geneva, Ohio	8th	60m hurdles	8.45
Representing University of Southern California
2019	NCAA Outdoor T&F Championships	University of Texas at Austin	16th	Decathlon	DNF 4,890 points
2019	Pac-12 Outdoor T&F Championships	University of Arizona	14th	Javelin	50.17 m
2019	Pac-12 Outdoor T&F Championships	University of Arizona	19th	Long Jump	foul
2019	Pac-12 Outdoor T&F Championships	University of Arizona	1st	4 × 400 m relay	3:05.73
2019	Pac-12 Outdoor T&F Championships	University of Arizona	3rd	110m hurdles	13.76
2019	Pac-12 Outdoor T&F Championships	University of Arizona	3rd	4 × 100 m relay	39.74
2019	Bryan Clay Invitational	Azusa Pacific University	1st	Decathlon	8,130 points
2019	NCAA Indoor T&F Championships	Texas A&M University	6th	Heptathlon	5,809 points
2019	MPSF Indoor T&F Championships	University of Washington	7th	60m hurdles	8.09
2019	MPSF Indoor T&F Championships	University of Washington	1st	4 × 400 m relay	3:06.40
2019	MPSF Indoor T&F Championships	University of Washington	14th	Long Jump	6.79 m
2019	MPSF Indoor T&F Championships	University of Washington	19th	Shot Put	12.91 m

International

Year	Competition	Venue	Position	Event	Notes
Representing Puerto Rico
2025	World Athletics Championships	Tokyo	2nd	Decathlon	8,784 points
2024	Olympic Games	Paris	9th	Decathlon	8,437 points
2023	World Athletics Championships	Budapest	16th	Decathlon	6,148 points
2023	Central American and Caribbean Games	San Salvador	1st	Decathlon	8,281 points
2022	World Athletics Championships	Eugene	4th	Decathlon	8,532 points
2018	World Athletics U20 Championships	Tampere	12th	Decathlon	6,744 points
2018	Puerto Rico U20 Outdoor Championships	Peñuelas	1st	200 meters	21.29
Representing United States
2017	USATF U20 Outdoor Championships	Sac State	12th	110m hurdles	14.19
2017	USATF U20 Outdoor Championships	Sac State	26th	400m hurdles	54.99
2016	USATF U20 Outdoor Championships	Sac State	1st	400m hurdles	53.13
2015	USATF Junior Olympics	UNF	3rd	Decathlon	5,626 points

== Personal bests ==
Information from World Athletics profile unless otherwise noted.

Outdoor

As of September 21, 2025

Individual events
Event	Performance	Location	Date
200 meters	20.88 (+0.0 m/s)	Fayetteville	April 21, 2023
300 meters	36.68	Shippensburg	May 26, 2018
400 meters	46.39	Kortrijk	July 13, 2024
110 meters hurdles	13.59 (+1.3 m/s)	Fayetteville	June 23, 2023
110 meters hurdles	13.57 (+3.8 m/s)	Fayetteville	June 23, 2023
400 meters hurdles	48.26	Baton Rouge	May 13, 2023
Long jump	7.09 m (23 ft 3 in) (+0.5 m/s)	Shippensburg	May 25, 2018
Pole vault	4.97 m (16 ft 3 1/2 in)	Champaign	May 2, 2025
Discus throw	47.42 m (155 ft 6 3/4 in)	Champaign	May 2, 2025
Javelin throw	56.07 m (183 ft 11 1/4 in)	Gainesville	April 18, 2025

Combined events
Event	Performance	Location	Date	Score	Ref.
Decathlon	—N/a	Tokyo	September 20–21, 2025	8,784 points	—N/a
100 meters	10.27 (+1.2 m/s)	Walnut	April 13, 2022	1,030 points	
Long jump	7.66 m (25 ft 1 1/2 in) (+0.2 m/s)	Paris	August 2, 2024	975 points	
Shot put	16.26 m (53 ft 4 in)	Walnut	April 17, 2024	867 points	
High jump	2.02 m (6 ft 7 1/2 in)	Paris	August 2, 2024	822 points	
400 meters	45.07NR	Eugene	July 23, 2022	1,056 points	
110 meters hurdles	13.73 (+0.9 m/s)	Walnut	April 18, 2024	1,010 points	
Discus throw	46.25 m (151 ft 8 3/4 in)	Eugene	June 9, 2022	793 points	
Pole vault	5.10 m (16 ft 8 3/4 in)	Walnut	April 18, 2024	941 points	
Javelin throw	59.28 m (194 ft 5 3/4 in)	Walnut	April 18, 2024	727 points	
1500 meters	4:13.02	Eugene	July 24, 2022	860 points	
Virtual Best Performance				9,081 points	—N/a

Indoor

As of July 14, 2025

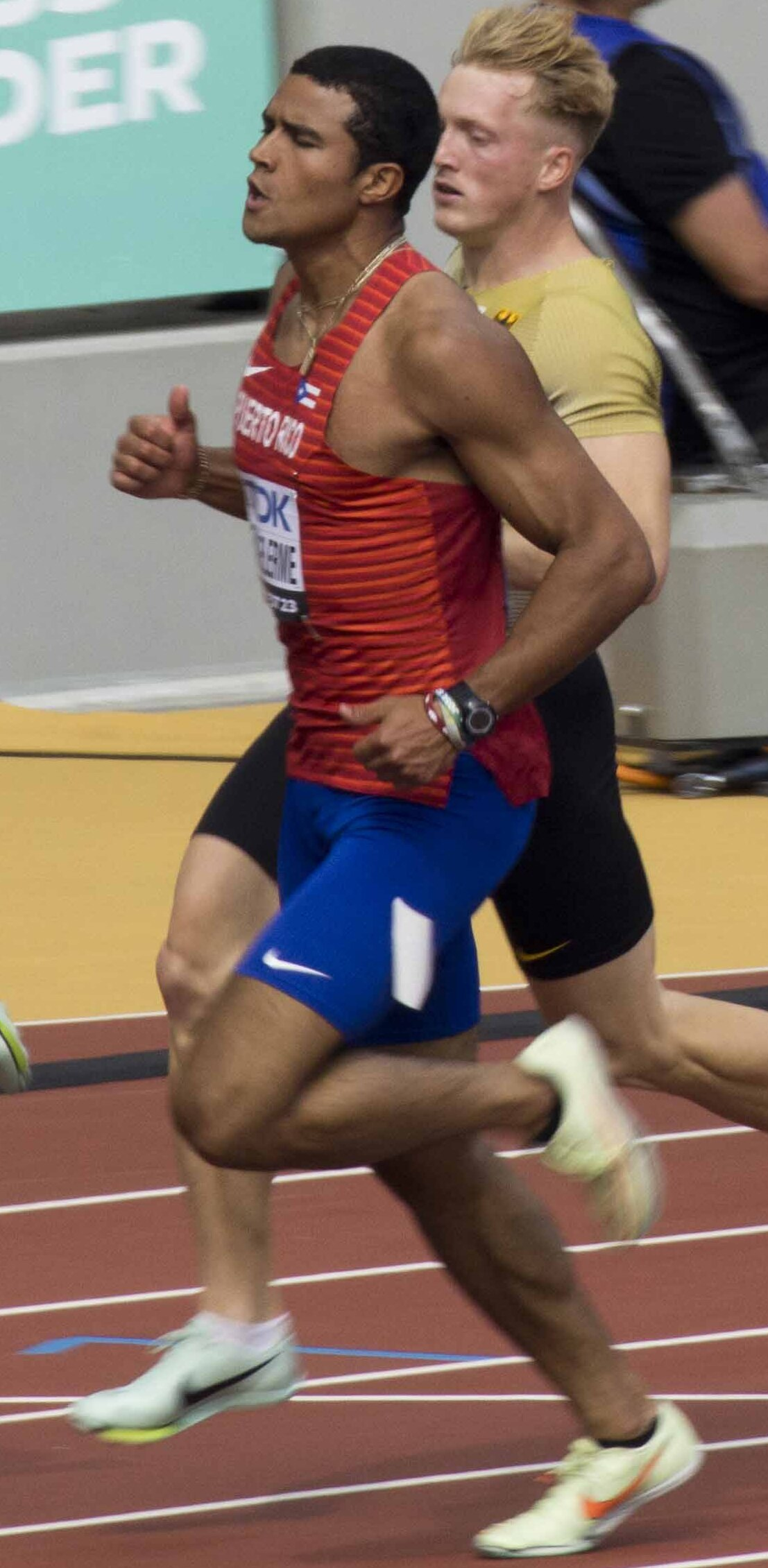
Ayden Owens-Delerme in 2023

Individual events
Event	Performance	Location	Date
60 meters	6.89	Bloomington	January 23, 2021
60 meters hurdles	7.71 NR	Albuquerque	February 4, 2023
Long jump	6.79 m (22 ft 3 1/4 in)	Seattle	February 22, 2019
High jump	1.87 m (6 ft 1 1/2 in)	Albuquerque	January 18, 2019
Pole vault	4.80 m (15 ft 8 3/4 in)	Fayetteville	January 14, 2022
Shot put	14.85 m (48 ft 8 1/2 in)	Bloomington	January 23, 2021

Combined events
Event	Performance	Location	Date	Score
Heptathlon	—N/a	Albuquerque	March 10–11, 2023	6,518 points
60 meters	6.75	Birmingham	March 8, 2019	973 points
Long jump	7.82 m (25 ft 7 3/4 in)	Albuquerque	March 10, 2023	1,015 points
Shot put	15.27 m (50 ft 1 in)	Albuquerque	March 10, 2023	806 points
High jump	2.04 m (6 ft 8 1/4 in)	Fayetteville	January 28, 2022	840 points
60 meters hurdles	7.73	Albuquerque	March 11, 2023	1,056 points
Pole vault	4.96 m (16 ft 3 1/4 in)	Albuquerque	March 11, 2023	898 points
1000 meters	2:31.55	Albuquerque	March 11, 2023	970 points
Virtual Best Performance				6,553 points
