= Albuquerque Convention Center =

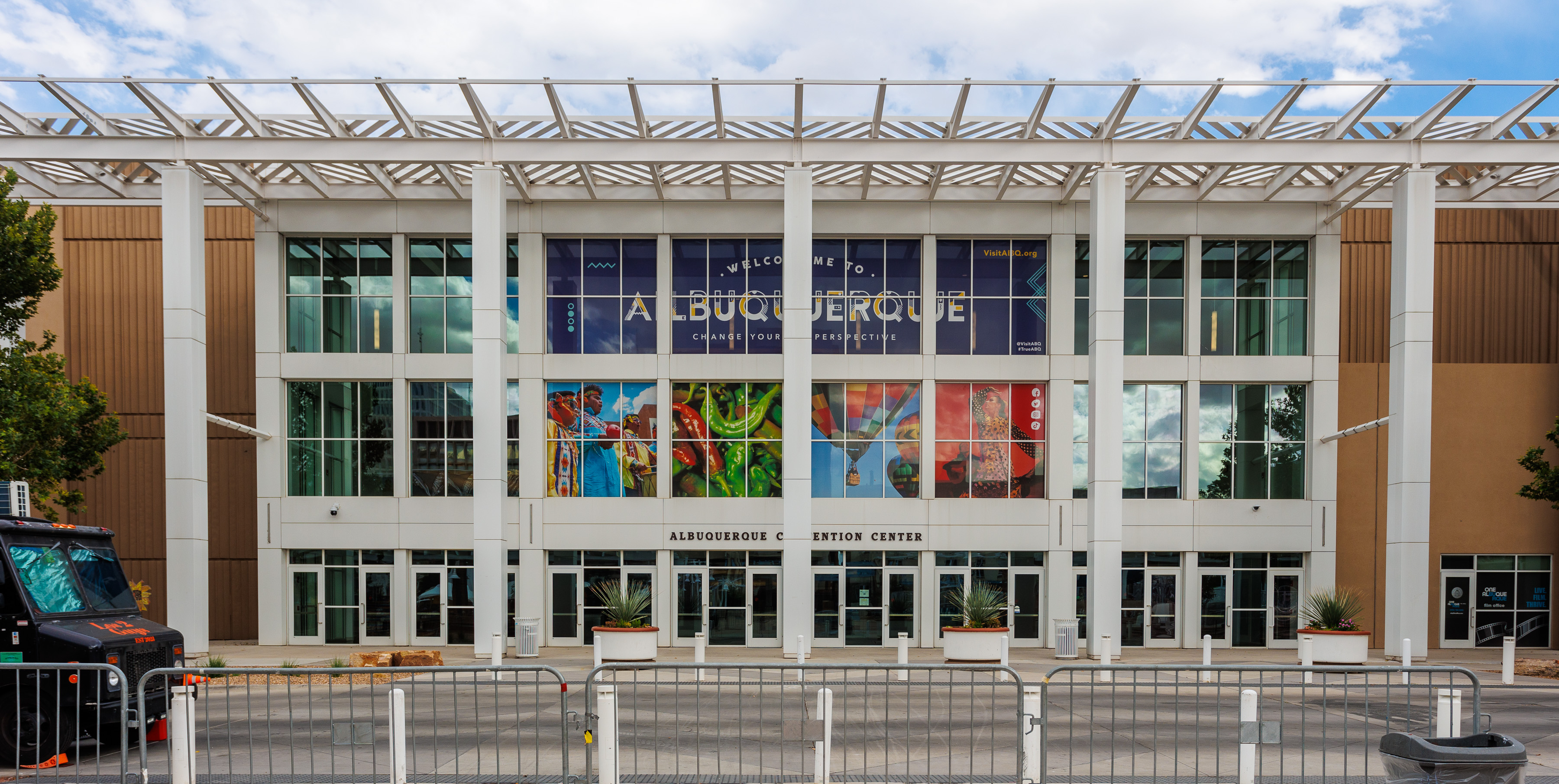

General information
- Coordinates: 35°5′12.1″N 106°38′51.6″W

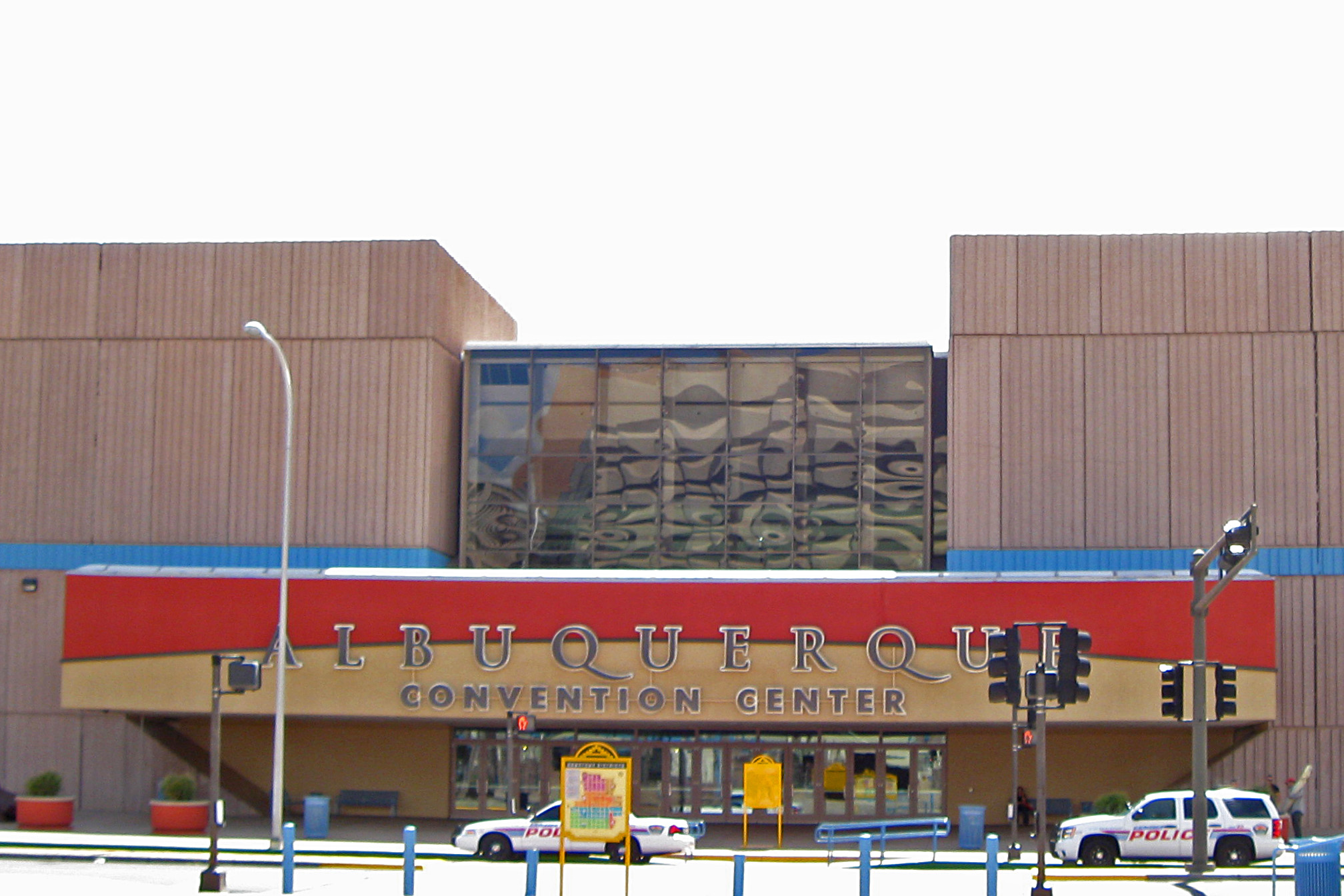
Before 2013 renovation

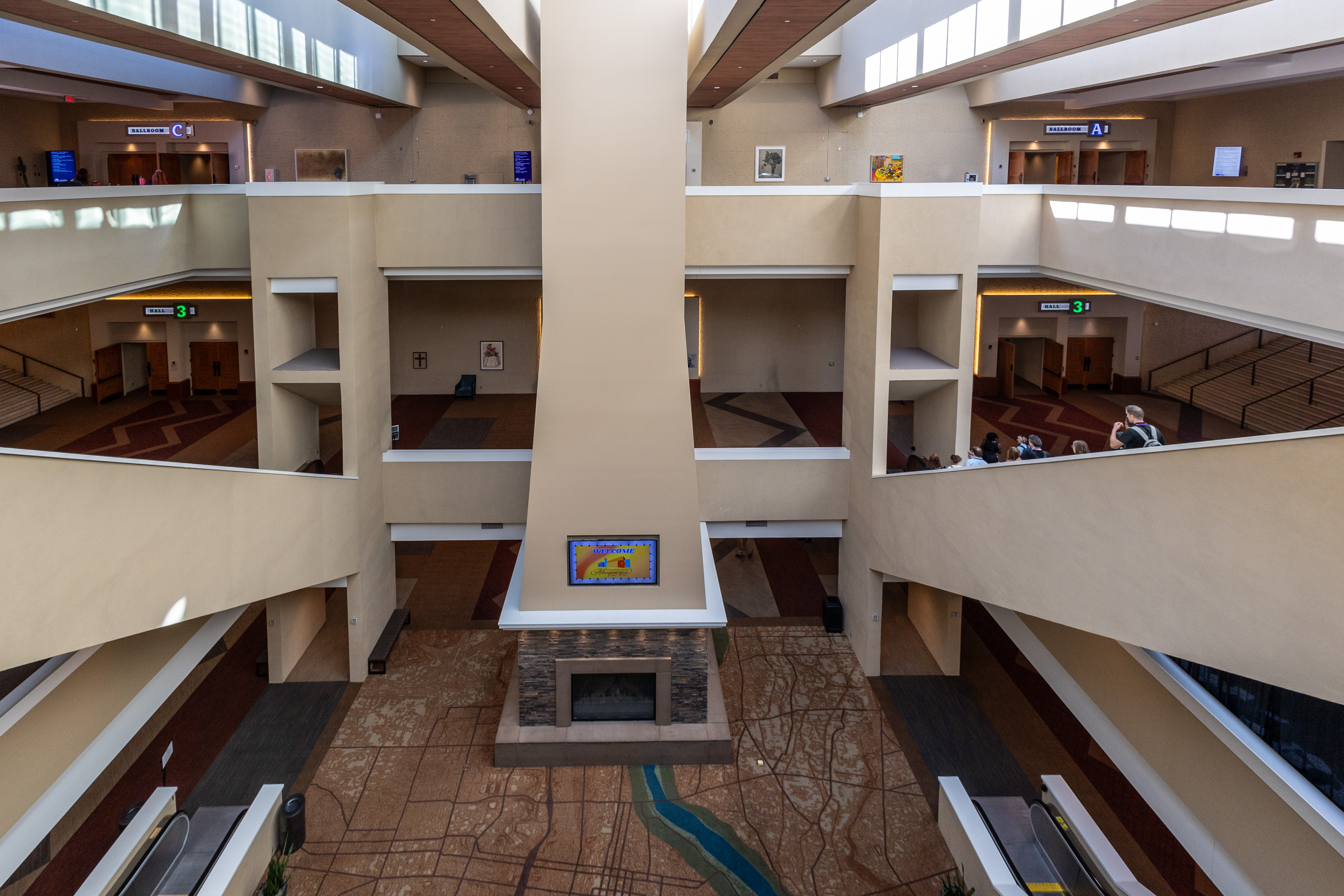
Atrium in 2024

Albuquerque Convention Center is a multipurpose convention and performing arts center in Albuquerque, New Mexico. It is New Mexico's largest convention center. The convention center hosts the Albuquerque Comic-Con and a lowrider exhibition sponsored by Lowrider called the Albuquerque Super Show, as well as music concerts, Broadway, and other stage shows. The building was designed by architects Flatow, Moore Bryan & Fairburn in 1972.

== Description ==
=== Exhibit halls ===
The largest exhibit hall in the complex is the Fran Hill Exhibit Hall with 106,200 square feet of exhibit space and a capacity of up to 9,048. With a ceiling height of 30 feet to low steel and 47 feet to the roof, Hill Exhibit Hall has also doubled as an multipurpose sports arena, and is the home of the University of New Mexico Lobos indoor track and field and Duke City Derby roller derby teams. It is also used for concerts, trade shows, graduation ceremonies and other special events. Two other separate convention halls, the Northwest and Mel C. Aragon Southwest Exhibit Halls, are also located at the convention center and have 30,173 square feet of space each.

=== Indoor Track ===
The track inside the Convention Center, installed in 2005, is a 200-meter, 60-degree-banked track with 60-meter straightaways running the entire length of the hall, as well as running runways, pits, facilities for shot put, pole vault and high jump events. Albuquerque Convention Center has hosted both the USA Indoor Track and Field Championships and the NCAA Men's Division I Indoor Track and Field Championship numerous times, most recently in 2023.

=== Kiva Auditorium ===
The 2,350-seat Kiva Auditorium is used for stage shows and other special events.

=== Meeting rooms ===
The convention center contains 27 meeting rooms, all named after pueblos, with total square footage of 46,395 square feet of space. Nine of the meeting rooms can be combined into two ballrooms with capacities of 1155 and 794, respectively, while six larger meeting rooms can also be created. The main ballroom at the Convention Center has 31,164 square feet of space and capacity for 2,400 and can be divided into three smaller rooms

=== Other amenities ===
The Albuquerque Convention Center also includes three permanent concession stands and many thematic portable food carts, 14 restrooms, five show offices, and press and conference facilities.

== 2013-2014 renovation ==
The Convention Center underwent a $25 million "complete renovation" in 2013-2014. Work included extensive remodeling of the ballrooms, kitchen, dock area, lighting, and exterior. The building received new amenities such as an executive conference room, service area, balcony, and a new floor-to-ceiling glass facade.

== Filming location ==
It was featured in Breaking Bad Season 5 Episode 12.
