= 2025 European Athletics U23 Championships – Men's decathlon =

Men's decathlon at the 2025 European Athletics U23 Championships
- Venue: Fana Stadion
- Location: Bergen, Norway
- Dates: 17 July; 18 July
- Competitors: 28 from 18 nations
- Winning score: 8188 pts

Medalists
gold medal	Andrin Huber	Switzerland
silver medal	Jeff Tesselaar	Netherlands
bronze medal	Antoine Ferranti	France

The men's decathlon event at the 2025 European Athletics U23 Championships was held in Bergen, Norway, at Fana Stadion on 17 and 18 July.

== Records ==
Prior to the competition, the records were as follows:

Record	Athlete (nation)	Points	Location	Date
European U23 record	Niklas Kaul (GER)	8691	Doha, Qatar	4 October 2019
Championship U23 record	Markus Rooth (NOR)	8608	Espoo, Finland	16 July 2023

== Results ==
=== Final standings ===
The highest mark recorded in each event is highlighted in yellow

Rank	Athlete	Nationality	100m	LJ	SP	HJ	400m	110m H	DT	PV	JT	1500m	Points	Notes
1st place, gold medalist(s)	Andrin Huber	Switzerland	10.95	7.11	14.03	2.00	47.93	14.23	41.75	4.80	60.50	4:23.09	8188	PB
2nd place, silver medalist(s)	Jeff Tesselaar	Netherlands	10.92	7.26	14.08	1.94	47.54	14.55	44.59	4.60	53.33	4:14.54	8108	
3rd place, bronze medalist(s)	Antoine Ferranti	France	11.42	7.25	13.97	2.09	49.15	14.96	42.82	4.80	57.92	4:23.32	8128	
4	Jonathan Hertwig-Ødegaard	Norway	10.87	6.81	14.62	1.91	47.43	14.39	42.09	4.50	59.83	4:23.19	8096	PB
5	Pol Ferrer	Spain	10.93	7.35	14.05	1.97	49.67	14.90	40.48	4.60	52.30	4:23.34	8010	PB
6	Sammy Ball	Great Britain	10.85	7.32	13.94	2.03	47.92	14.71	42.12	4.60	41.86	4:35.21	7817	
7	Adam Havlícek	Czech Republic	11.37	6.93	13.35	1.97	50.59	14.65	41.49	5.00	58.37	4:29.23	7844	PB
8	Zsombor Gálpál	Hungary	10.96	6.57	15.10	1.88	46.98	14.47	38.68	4.30	58.54	4:35.40	7715	
9	Fred Isaac Fleurisson	Germany	11.02	7.11	13.52	2.06	48.55	13.96	39.69	4.30	58.18	5:10.19	7685	
10	Friedrich Schulze	Germany	11.82	6.94	13.84	2.00	49.62	15.05	46.52	5.20	49.41	4:45.86	7677	
11	Roman Jocher	Germany	11.41	7.09	12.84	2.00	50.13	14.73	39.20	4.60	57.87	4:26.48	7669	
12	Dai Keïta	Belgium	11.34	7.16	12.28	2.00	50.00	14.78	38.62	5.00	50.18	4:33.49	7615	
13	Leo Göransson	Sweden	11.20	7.27	14.30	1.88	49.87	15.74	38.76	4.70	57.17	4:36.79	7575	PB
14	Elliot Duvert	Sweden	11.38	6.75	12.52	1.97	49.60	14.62	38.89	5.10	49.36	4:38.92	7525	
15	Melchior Treffers	Netherlands	11.07	6.95	12.85	1.88	48.99	14.73	39.80	4.80	53.89	4:51.63	7509	
16	Konstantinos Karagiannidis	Greece	11.42	6.69	13.29	1.91	49.43	15.39	43.40	4.30	57.07	4:28.51	7446	
17	Daan Roosenschoon	Netherlands	10.95	6.78	14.64	1.88	48.61	15.39	38.37	4.00	53.63	4:26.79	7416	
18	Alberto Nonino	Italy	11.19	6.71	12.36	1.91	48.92	15.04	39.74	4.60	44.87	4:26.71	7354	
19	Louis Miller	Switzerland	11.08	7.01	13.21	1.76	49.24	15.14	34.29	4.50	48.35	4:46.26	7129	
20	Lorenzo Mellano	Italy	11.02	7.01	9.94	1.91	47.44	14.77	29.04	4.20	42.48	4:38.20	6980	
21	Ognen Stefanovski	North Macedonia	11.46	6.61	11.79	1.76	50.41	15.40	34.93	3.80	47.14	4:35.45	6648	NR
	Roko Farkaš	Croatia	10.73	7.78	13.69	2.00	47.85	14.43	36.24	NM	DNS		DNF	
	Maxime Moitie-Charnois	France	10.89	7.10	12.79	1.94	48.01	14.45	36.41	NM	DNS		DNF	
	Alexis Caule-Duler	France	11.38	7.13	15.39	2.03	50.31	14.65	41.11	NM	DNS		DNF	
	Jan Duhovnik	Slovenia	11.18	7.02	13.40	1.94	50.32	DNF	DNS				DNF	
	Andreas Hantson	Estonia	11.48	7.00	12.49	2.00	50.25	16.38	DNS				DNF	
