= 2025 Hypo-Meeting =

- Venue: Mösle Stadium
- Location: Götzis, Austria
- Dates: May 31–June 1
- Website: https://meeting-goetzis.at/en/

Champions
- Men: (Norway) Sander Skotheim (8909)
- Women: (United States) Anna Hall (7032)

The 50th edition of the annual Hypo-Meeting took place on May 31 and July 1, 2025, in Götzis, Vorarlberg (Austria). The track and field competition, featuring a men's decathlon and a women's heptathlon event was part of the 2025 World Athletics Combined Events Tour.

== Men's decathlon ==
=== Records ===
World Record	Kevin Mayer (FRA)	9126	16 September 2018	Talence, France
Event Record	Roman Šebrle (CZE)	9026	27 May 2001	Götzis, Austria

=== Results ===
The best mark recorded in each event is highlighted in yellow

Rank	Athlete	Decathlon										Points
Rank	Athlete	100	LJ	SP	HJ	400	110H	DT	PV	JT	1500	Points
1	Sander Skotheim (NOR)	10.70	8.06	13.98	2.15	47.47	14.12	49.18	5.10	61.46	4:23.88	8909 WL NR
2	Kyle Garland (USA)	10.50	7.54	16.14	2.15	49.00	14.04	49.10	4.90	58.77	4:49.69	8626 SB
3	Simon Ehammer (SUI)	10.57	8.34	13.60	2.06	47.18	13.57	41.02	5.10	55.30	4:47.96	8575 NR
3	Niklas Kaul (GER)	11.12	7.34	15.09	2.03	48.16	14.69	47.77	4.80	72.13	4:16.40	8575 SB
5	Leo Neugebauer (GER)	10.66	7.91	15.93	2.00	47.84	14.81	51.47	5.10	54.28	4:45.73	8555 SB
6	Damian Warner (CAN)	10.39	7.51	14.41	2.00	47.57	13.76	47.34	4.70	62.30	4:38.44	8527 SB
7	Ayden Owens-Delerme (PUR)	10.33	7.65	16.19	2.00	46.20	14.09	39.55	4.80	54.35	4:34.76	8486 SB
8	Heath Baldwin (USA)	10.77	7.50	14.48	2.12	48.72	14.01	40.94	4.80	66.03	4:36.83	8430 SB
9	Karel Tilga (EST)	10.91	7.53	15.83	1.91	49.27	14.89	51.47	4.50	69.59	4:27.29	8405 SB
10	Jeff Tesselaar (NED)	10.68	7.27	13.72	1.97	47.13	14.82	46.00	4.60	54.66	4.08.31	8249 PB
11	Rasmus Roosleht (EST)	10.81	7.19	15.74	2.03	49.29	14.83	47.96	4.90	60.63	4:46.46	8241 PB
12	Sammy Ball (GBR)	10.55	7.41	14.54	1.97	47.29	14.70	42.50	4.40	49.85	4:18.12	8100 PB
13	Lewis Church (GBR)	11.00	7.02	15.11	2.03	49.68	14.47	44.61	4.70	54.95	4:21.23	8093 PB
14	Manuel Eitel (GER)	10.46	6.77	15.02	1.91	48.74	14.58	45.48	4.90	61.36	4:46.92	8086 SB
15	Kendrick Thompson (BAH)	10.72	7.43	13.27	2.00	48.70	14.41	41.11	4.60	62.26	4:36.46	8079 SB
16	Jente Hauttekeete (BEL)	10.61	7.53	14.90	2.03	48.31	14.55	36.07	4.80	55.67	4:46.26	8053 SB
17	Matthias Lasch (AUT)	10.91	7.36	13.48	1.91	49.45	14.78	44.22	4.90	55.14	4:25.72	7986 SB
18	Risto Lillemets (EST)	10.91	6.93	14.51	1.91	49.35	14.79	46.80	4.80	53.72	4:28.93	7930 SB
19	Vilém Strásky (CZE)	10.83	7.01	14.00	1.94	48.75	14.48	40.52	4.70	56.11	4:26.55	7918 SB
20	Finley Gaio (SUI)	10.60	7.56	13,94	1.82	48.01	14.03	42.94	4.60	48.62	4:39.59	7917 SB
21	Edgaras Benkunskas (LTU)	11.12	6.98	15.40	1.94	50.08	15.17	47.26	4.30	59.67	4:47.76	7726 SB
22	Andrin Huber (SUI)	10.96	6.82	13.22	1.94	49.49	14.85	40.14	4.70	55.54	4:24.75	7713 SB
	Harrison Williams (USA)	10.57	7.53	15.45	1.94	46.86	14.68	46.32	NM	DNS		DNF
	Jack Flood (USA)	11.19	NM	14.47	2.03	50.70	14.53	45.63	DNS			DNF
	Pierce LePage (CAN)	10.70	7.42	15.26	2.03	49.59	14.59	47.15	DNS			DNF
	Jack Turner (GBR)	10.73	7.30	12.51	1.88	DNF	14.79	33.14	DNS			DNF
	Dario Dester (ITA)	10.65	7.32	13.69	1.94	47.45	14.46	DNS				DNF
	José Fernando Ferreira (BRA)	10.65	7.10	13.65	1.88	DNS						DNF
	Tomas Järvinen (CZE)	10.77	7.36	11.84	2.00	DNS						DNF
	Hakim McMorris (USA)	10.54	7.45	14.20	1.85	DNS						DNF
	Tim Nowak (GER)	11.22	6.96	15.45	NM	DNS						DNF
	Rik Taam (NED)	10.64	7.16	13.69	1.91	DNS						DNF
	Amadeus Gräber (GER)	10.53	7.08	13.09	DNS							DNF
	Lindon Victor (GRN)	10.52	7.37	14.51	DNS							DNF

== Women's heptathlon ==
=== Records ===
World Record	Jackie Joyner-Kersee (USA)	7291	September 24, 1988	Seoul, South Korea
Event Record	Nafissatou Thiam (BEL)	7013	May 28, 2017	Götzis, Austria

=== Results ===
The best mark recorded in each event is highlighted in yellow

Rank	Athlete	Heptathlon							Points
Rank	Athlete	100H	HJ	SP	200m	LJ	JT	800m	Points
1	Anna Hall (USA)	13.19	1.95	14.86	23.37	6.44	46.16	2:01.23	7032 MR WL PB
2	Sofie Dokter (NED)	13.50	1.86	14.17	23.46	6.42	41.75	2:10.88	6576 PB
3	Martha Araújo (COL)	13.32	1.74	13.85	24.50	6.63	49.42	2:15.89	6475 AR
4	Michelle Atherley (USA)	12.93	1.68	13.23	23.59	6.15	45.57	2:05.81	6425 SB
5	Annik Kälin (SUI)	13.05	1.77	13.69	23.42	6.77	39.88	2:24.26	6395 SB
6	Allie Jones (USA)	13.25	1.74	13.10	23.57	6.36	39.82	2:07.94	6367 PB
7	Serina Riedel (GER)	13.98	1.77	13.37	23.98	6.46	46.56	2:16.14	6322 PB
8	Abigail Pawlett (GBR)	12.94	1.74	13.46	23.06	6.42	35.44	2:15.43	6315 PB
9	María Vicente (ESP)	13.44	1.77	13.60	23.98	6.41	41.60	2:17.18	6288 SB
10	Sarolta Kriszt (HUN)	13.35	1.68	11.89	23.43	6.23	42.97	2:08.38	6225 N20R
11	Erin Marsh (USA)	12.93	1.71	13.14	23.60	6.25	35.18	2:13.73	6171 PB
12	Sienna MacDonald (CAN)	12.97	1.71	12.11	23.79	6.29	42.07	2:19.09	6148 PB
13	Sandra Röthlin (SUI)	13.48	1.68	14.59	24,53	6.09	40.62	2:14.19	6106 PB
14	Beatrice Juškevičiūtė (LTU)	13.56	1.62	13.20	23.85	5.99	44.25	2:13.85	6040
15	Lovisa Karlsson (SWE)	13.31	1.71	12.50	24.29	6.25	39.66	2:18.38	6026 SB
16	Marie Dehning (GER)	14.19	1.62	13.84	24.51	6.08	49.15	2:18.90	5983 PB
17	Briana Stephenson (NZL)	13.36	1.74	11.11	23.83	6.09	35.53	2:13.57	5945
18	Chiara-Belinda Schuler (AUT)	13.77	1.62	13.23	24.69	6.01	45.72	2:18.37	5904 SB
19	Liisa-Maria Lusti (EST)	13.67	1.77	11.35	24.00	6.35	34.31	2:20.76	5896 PB
20	Maddie Wilson (NZL)	14.45	1.86	12.11	24.77	5.92	35.02	2:12.39	5873 SB
	Timara Chapman (USA)	13.52	1.83	12.31	24.60	6.25	36.54	DNS	DNF
	Adrianna Sułek-Schubert (POL)	14.18	1.77	14.06	24.09	5.87	NM	DNS	DNF
	Tori West (AUS)	13.62	1.68	12.55	24.15	5.64	50.48	DNS	DNF
	Xénia Krizsán (HUN)	13.81	1.68	13.87	24.89	5.98	DNS		DNF
DNS	Marys Adela Patterson (CUB)	DNS							
