= 2026 European Athletics Championships – Men's decathlon =

Men's decathlon at the 2026 European Athletics Championships
- Venue: Alexander Stadium
- Location: Birmingham, United Kingdom
- Dates: 12–13 August 2026
- Winning score: 8611 points

Medalists
gold medal	Leo Neugebauer	Germany
silver medal	Niklas Kaul	Germany
bronze medal	Sander Skotheim	Norway

The men's decathlon at the 2026 European Athletics Championships took place in Birmingham, United Kingdom, on 12 and 13 August 2026.

== Background ==
Records before the 2026 European Athletics Championships
Record	Athlete (nation)	Score	Location	Date
World record	Kevin Mayer (FRA)	9126 pts	Talence, France	16 September 2018
World leading	Simon Ehammer (SUI)	8778 pts	Götzis, Austria	31 May 2026
Championship record	Daley Thompson (GBR)	8811 pts	Stuttgart, West Germany	28 August 1986
European record	Kevin Mayer (FRA)	9126 pts	Talence, France	16 September 2018
European leading	Simon Ehammer (SUI)	8778 pts	Götzis, Austria	31 May 2026

== Qualification ==
The qualification period was from 27 January 2025 to 26 July 2026. Athletes qualified by the entry standard of 8300 points or more, by wildcard for the 2024 European Athletics Champion, or by their position on the World Athletics Rankings for the event. The target number was 25 athletes.

Qualification standings per 31 July 2026
QP	CP	Country	Athlete	Status	Details
1	1	Estonia	Johannes Erm	Qualified by Wild Card	Defending European Champion
2	1	Norway	Sander Skotheim	Qualified by Entry Standard	8909 - Mösle-Stadium, Götzis (AUT) - 01 JUN 2025
3	1	Germany	Leo Neugebauer	Qualified by Entry Standard	8804 - National Stadium, Tokyo (JPN) - 21 SEP 2025
4	2	Germany	Niklas Kaul	Qualified by Entry Standard	8575 - Mösle-Stadium, Götzis (AUT) - 01 JUN 2025
5	1	France	Makenson Gletty	Qualified by Entry Standard	8458 - Stadionring, Ratingen (GER) - 28 JUN 2026
6	1	Netherlands	Sven Roosen	Qualified by Entry Standard	8428 - Mösle-Stadium, Götzis (AUT) - 31 MAY 2026
7	2	Estonia	Karel Tilga	Qualified by Entry Standard	8413 - Mösle-Stadium, Götzis (AUT) - 31 MAY 2026
8	1	Czech Republic	Tomas Järvinen	Qualified by Entry Standard	8400 - Mösle-Stadium, Götzis (AUT) - 31 MAY 2026
9	3	Germany	Amadeus Gräber	Qualified by Entry Standard	8345 - Mösle-Stadium, Götzis (AUT) - 31 MAY 2026
10	3	Estonia	Rasmus Roosleht	Qualified by Entry Standard	8336 - Stadionring, Ratingen (GER) - 28 JUN 2026
11	1	Italy	Dario Dester	Qualified by Entry Standard	8318 - Stadionring, Ratingen (GER) - 28 JUN 2026
12	2	Czech Republic	Vilém Stráský	Qualified by World Rankings	8th - 1217 points
13	2	France	Antoine Ferranti	Qualified by World Rankings	11th - 1205 points
14	3	Czech Republic	Ondřej Kopecký	Qualified by World Rankings	12th - 1201 points
15	1	Switzerland	Andrin Huber	Qualified by World Rankings	17th - 1183 points
16	4	Estonia	Risto Lillemets	Qualified by World Rankings	20th - 1179 points
17	2	Netherlands	Jeff Tesselaar	Qualified by World Rankings	21st - 1179 points
18	3	Netherlands	Luuk Pelkmans	Qualified by World Rankings	24th - 1169 points
19	1	Lithuania	Edgaras Benkunskas	Qualified by World Rankings	27th - 1164 points
20	1	Belgium	Dai Keïta	Qualified by World Rankings	28th - 1161 points
reserve	4	Netherlands	Jip De Greef	Qualified by World Rankings	29th - 1160 points
21	1	Hungary	Zsombor Gálpál	Qualified by World Rankings	30th - 1157 points
reserve	4	Germany	Marcel Meyer	Qualified by World Rankings	31st - 1156 points
22	2	Switzerland	Nino Portmann	Qualified by World Rankings	34th - 1153 points
reserve	5	Netherlands	Sven Jansons	Qualified by World Rankings	37th - 1149 points
23	2	Italy	Alberto Nonino	Qualified by World Rankings	39th - 1143 points
24	3	Switzerland	Leon Krummenacher	Qualified by World Rankings	40th - 1142 points
25	1	Sweden	Emil Uhlin	Qualified by World Rankings	41st - 1140 points
reserve	1	Denmark	Sofus Olivarius Vølund	Next best by World Rankings	48th - 1124 points
reserve	2	Norway	Jonathan Hertwig-Ødegaard	Next best by World Rankings	50th - 1120 points
reserve	3	Italy	Andrea Cerrato	Next best by World Rankings	53rd - 1117 points

== Schedule ==
Date	Time	Round
12 August 2026	10:35	100 metres
12 August 2026	11:20	Long jump
12 August 2026	12:45	Shot put
12 August 2026	19:05	High jump
12 August 2026	21:22	400 metres
13 August 2026	10:33	110 metres hurdles
13 August 2026	11:20	Discus throw
13 August 2026	13:00	Pole vault
13 August 2026	18:35	Javelin throw
13 August 2026	21:10	1500 metres

All times are local times (UTC+1)

== Results ==
=== 100 metres ===
Wind:
Heat 1: -0.8 m/s, Heat 2: -2.1 m/s, Heat 3: +0.2 m/s

Rank	Heat	Lane	Name	Nationality	Time	Notes	Points
1	3	6	Nino Portmann	Switzerland	10.69		931
2	3	3	Jeff Tesselaar	Netherlands	10.75		917
3	3	7	Amadeus Gräber	Germany	10.79		908
4	3	8	Makenson Gletty	France	10.80		906
5	3	4	Tomas Järvinen	Czech Republic	10.82		901
6	3	1	Dario Dester	Italy	10.84		897
7	2	5	Vilém Stráský	Czech Republic	10.88		888
8	1	2	Johannes Erm	Estonia	10.88	SB	888
9	3	9	Leo Neugebauer	Germany	10.90		883
10	3	2	Dai Keïta	Belgium	10.90		883
11	2	7	Rasmus Roosleht	Estonia	10.91		881
12	2	2	Sander Skotheim	Norway	10.95		872
13	3	5	Zsombor Gálpál	Hungary	10.96		870
14	2	4	Andrin Huber	Switzerland	10.98		865
15	2	3	Risto Lillemets	Estonia	11.09		841
16	2	6	Jip De Greef	Netherlands	11.12		834
17	2	8	Alberto Nonino	Italy	11.16		825
18	1	3	Ondřej Kopecký	Czech Republic	11.21	SB	814
19	2	1	Karel Tilga	Estonia	11.22		812
20	1	8	Niklas Kaul	Germany	11.23	SB	810
21	1	6	Edgaras Benkunskas	Lithuania	11.27		801
22	1	5	Emil Uhlin	Sweden	11.27		801
23	2	9	Luuk Pelkmans	Netherlands	11.28		799
24	1	7	Leon Krummenacher	Switzerland	11.36		782
25	1	4	Antoine Ferranti	France	11.37		780

=== Long jump ===
Rank	Group	Name	Nationality	#1	#2	#3	Result	Notes	Points	Total
1	A	Leo Neugebauer	Germany	7.61	x	7.82	7.82		1015	1898
2	A	Sander Skotheim	Norway	x	7.66	7.80	7.80	SB	1010	1882
3	A	Jeff Tesselaar	Netherlands	7.35	x	7.67	7.67	SB	977	1894
4	A	Vilém Stráský	Czech Republic	6.66	7.28	7.54	7.54	PB	945	1833
5	B	Johannes Erm	Estonia	7.42	7.35	7.49	7.49	SB	932	1820
6	A	Luuk Pelkmans	Netherlands	6.85	6.98	7.44	7.44		920	1719
7	A	Nino Portmann	Switzerland	x	7.13	7.43	7.43		918	1849
8	A	Antoine Ferranti	France	6.55	7.39	7.27	7.39		908	1688
9	A	Dai Keïta	Belgium	7.33	x	7.28	7.33		893	1776
10	A	Karel Tilga	Estonia	7.28	7.28	7.17	7.28		881	1693
11	B	Amadeus Gräber	Germany	7.23	6.83	7.33	7.33		869	1777
12	B	Niklas Kaul	Germany	7.22	7.13	-	7.22	SB	866	1676
13	B	Makenson Gletty	France	7.19	7.20	6.87	7.20		862	1768
14	A	Tomas Järvinen	Czech Republic	7.18	5.45	r	7.18		857	1758
15	A	Dario Dester	Italy	6.89	6.78	7.12	7.12		842	1739
16	A	Ondřej Kopecký	Czech Republic	x	7.10	x	7.10		838	1652
17	B	Andrin Huber	Switzerland	6.72	7.06	x	7.06	SB	828	1693
18	A	Jip De Greef	Netherlands	6.93	7.02	6.98	7.02		818	1652
19	B	Risto Lillemets	Estonia	6.97	6.67	6.91	6.97		807	1648
20	B	Rasmus Roosleht	Estonia	6.95	6.85	6.80	6.95		802	1683
21	B	Alberto Nonino	Italy	6.91	6.72	6.87	6.91		792	1617
22	B	Edgaras Benkunskas	Lithuania	6.76	6.90	6.81	6.90		790	1591
23	B	Emil Uhlin	Sweden	x	x	6.72	6.72	SB	748	1549
24	B	Leon Krummenacher	Switzerland	6.19	6.50	x	6.50		697	1479
25	B	Zsombor Gálpál	Hungary	6.42	6.46	6.30	6.46		688	1558

=== Shot put ===
Rank	Group	Name	Nationality	#1	#2	#3	Result	Notes	Points	Total
1	A	Leo Neugebauer	Germany	17.13	x	x	17.13	CDB, SB	921	2819
2	A	Rasmus Roosleht	Estonia	15.34	x	15.88	15.88		844	2527
3	A	Makenson Gletty	France	14.55	15.13	15.65	15.65		830	2598
4	A	Risto Lillemets	Estonia	15.05	x	15.47	15.47		819	2467
5	A	Karel Tilga	Estonia	15.22	15.34	15.46	15.46		818	2511
6	A	Niklas Kaul	Germany	13.45	14.97	15.26	15.26	PB	806	2482
7	A	Luuk Pelkmans	Netherlands	14.54	x	15.16	15.16		800	2519
8	B	Jeff Tesselaar	Netherlands	15.11	x	x	15.11	PB	796	2690
9	A	Edgaras Benkunskas	Lithuania	14.85	x	x	14.85		780	2371
10	A	Andrin Huber	Switzerland	14.57	14.20	14.62	14.62		766	2459
11	A	Zsombor Gálpál	Hungary	12.95	14.38	14.56	14.56		763	2321
12	B	Johannes Erm	Estonia	14.36	x	14.55	14.55	SB	762	2582
13	A	Dario Dester	Italy	13.83	14.48	x	14.48		758	2497
14	B	Sander Skotheim	Norway	13.53	14.45	14.10	14.45	SB	756	2638
15	B	Vilém Stráský	Czech Republic	14.08	13.95	14.10	14.10		734	2567
16	A	Nino Portmann	Switzerland	x	14.00	x	14.00		728	2577
17	B	Leon Krummenacher	Switzerland	13.47	x	x	13.47		696	2175
18	B	Jip De Greef	Netherlands	12.98	13.40	13.12	13.40		692	2344
19	B	Amadeus Gräber	Germany	12.66	13.05	13.29	13.29		685	2462
20	B	Emil Uhlin	Sweden	12.75	13.12	12.69	13.12		675	2224
21	B	Antoine Ferranti	France	13.09	12.49	13.07	13.09		673	2361
22	A	Ondřej Kopecký	Czech Republic	12.25	13.09	x	13.09		673	2325
23	B	Dai Keïta	Belgium	12.36	12.52	12.77	12.77		653	2429
24	B	Alberto Nonino	Italy	x	11.53	11.38	11.53		578	2195
	B	Tomas Järvinen	Czech Republic	Did not start						

=== High jump ===
Rank	Group	Name	Nationality	1.75	1.78	1.81	1.84	1.87	1.90	1.93	1.96	1.99	2.02	2.05	2.08	Result	Notes	Points	Total
1	A	Antoine Ferranti	France	−	−	−	−	−	−	−	o	−	o	o	xxx	2.05		850	3211
2	A	Emil Uhlin	Sweden	−	−	−	−	−	o	−	o	o	xxo	o	xxx	2.05	SB	850	3074
3	A	Sander Skotheim	Norway	−	−	−	−	−	−	o	−	o	−	xo	xxx	2.05		850	3488
4	B	Karel Tilga	Estonia	−	−	−	o	o	o	o	o	o	o	xxx		2.02	SB	822	3333
5	A	Niklas Kaul	Germany	−	−	−	−	−	−	o	o	o	xo	xxx		2.02	SB	822	3304
5	A	Luuk Pelkmans	Netherlands	−	−	−	−	−	−	o	−	o	xo	xxx		2.02		822	3341
7	A	Makenson Gletty	France	−	−	−	−	−	−	o	o	xxo	xxo	xxx		2.02	SB	822	3420
8	B	Dario Dester	Italy	−	−	−	o	o	o	o	o	o	xxx			1.99	SB	794	3291
9	A	Leo Neugebauer	Germany	−	−	−	−	o	o	o	xxo	o	xxx			1.99		794	3613
10	B	Johannes Erm	Estonia	−	−	−	o	−	o	o	o	xxo	xxx			1.99	SB	794	3376
11	A	Amadeus Gräber	Germany	−	−	−	o	o	o	xo	xxo	xxo	xxx			1.99		794	3256
12	B	Andrin Huber	Switzerland	−	−	−	o	o	o	o	o	xxx				1.96	SB	767	3226
12	A	Dai Keïta	Belgium	−	−	−	−	o	−	o	o	xxx				1.96		767	3196
14	A	Jip De Greef	Netherlands	−	−	−	−	−	o	xo	xo	xxx				1.96		767	3111
14	B	Risto Lillemets	Estonia	−	−	−	−	o	o	xo	xo	xxx				1.96	SB	767	3234
16	B	Jeff Tesselaar	Netherlands	−	−	−	o	o	o	xxo	xxo	xxx				1.96	SB	767	3457
17	A	Edgaras Benkunskas	Lithuania	−	−	−	−	o	o	o	xxx					1.93		740	3111
17	B	Alberto Nonino	Italy	−	−	−	o	o	o	o	xxx					1.93		740	2935
17	A	Rasmus Roosleht	Estonia	−	−	−	−	−	o	o	xxx					1.93		740	3267
20	B	Vilém Stráský	Czech Republic	−	−	−	o	−	xxo	xo	xxx					1.93	=SB	740	3307
21	B	Nino Portmann	Switzerland	−	−	o	xo	o	xxx							1.87		687	3264
22	B	Leon Krummenacher	Switzerland	o	−	o	o	xo	r							1.87		687	2862
23	B	Zsombor Gálpál	Hungary	−	o	o	xo	xo	xxx							1.87		687	3008
24	B	Ondřej Kopecký	Czech Republic	−	−	−	xxo	xxx								1.84		661	2986

=== 400 metres ===
Rank	Heat	Lane	Name	Nationality	Time	Notes	Points	Total
1	3	3	Jeff Tesselaar	Netherlands	47.06	PB	955	4412
2	2	7	Rasmus Roosleht	Estonia	47.84	PB	917	4184
3	3	3	Dario Dester	Italy	47.96		911	4202
4	2	9	Dai Keïta	Belgium	47.97	PB	911	4107
5	2	5	Niklas Kaul	Germany	47.99	SB	910	4214
6	3	5	Nino Portmann	Switzerland	48.06	SB	906	4170
7	1	3	Johannes Erm	Estonia	48.07	SB	906	4282
8	2	8	Andrin Huber	Switzerland	48.11	SB	904	4130
9	3	8	Makenson Gletty	France	48.13		903	4323
10	3	7	Antoine Ferranti	France	48.22	PB	899	4110
11	2	2	Amadeus Gräber	Germany	48.31	PB	894	4150
12	1	4	Sander Skotheim	Norway	48.31	SB	894	4382
13	3	9	Alberto Nonino	Italy	48.33		893	3828
14	3	2	Zsombor Gálpál	Hungary	48.42		889	3897
15	2	4	Vilém Stráský	Czech Republic	48.45	SB	887	4194
16	3	6	Leo Neugebauer	Germany	48.81		870	4483
17	1	6	Karel Tilga	Estonia	49.10	SB	857	4190
18	2	1	Emil Uhlin	Sweden	49.11		856	3930
19	2	6	Luuk Pelkmans	Netherlands	49.18		853	4194
20	1	8	Risto Lillemets	Estonia	49.23		850	4084
21	2	3	Jip De Greef	Netherlands	49.76		826	3937
22	1	7	Edgaras Benkunskas	Lithuania	50.29	=SB	801	3912
23	1	5	Leon Krummenacher	Switzerland	50.30	PB	801	3663
	1	2	Ondřej Kopecký	Czech Republic	Did not start			

=== 110 metres hurdles ===
Wind:
Heat 1: -2.2 m/s, Heat 2: -1.9 m/s, Heat 3: -1.7 m/s

Rank	Heat	Lane	Name	Nationality	Time	Notes	Points	Total
1	3	7	Makenson Gletty	France	14.18		951	5274
2	2	4	Andrin Huber	Switzerland	14.29		937	5067
3	3	6	Nino Portmann	Switzerland	14.45		917	5087
4	3	8	Vilém Stráský	Czech Republic	14.47		915	5109
5	1	9	Sander Skotheim	Norway	14.50	SB	911	5293
6	2	4	Risto Lillemets	Estonia	14.64		894	4978
7	2	6	Jeff Tesselaar	Netherlands	14.65		892	5304
8	1	6	Antoine Ferranti	France	14.72		884	4994
9	1	8	Rasmus Roosleht	Estonia	14.72		884	5068
10	3	2	Niklas Kaul	Germany	14.73		882	5096
11	2	8	Amadeus Gräber	Germany	14.74		881	5031
12	3	9	Jip De Greef	Netherlands	14.76		879	4816
13	3	5	Dario Dester	Italy	14.79		875	5077
14	1	5	Dai Keïta	Belgium	14.84		869	4976
15	2	3	Leon Krummenacher	Switzerland	14.87		865	4528
16	2	2	Leo Neugebauer	Germany	14.94		857	5340
17	3	3	Luuk Pelkmans	Netherlands	14.97		853	5047
18	1	3	Emil Uhlin	Sweden	15.03		846	4776
19	1	4	Karel Tilga	Estonia	15.04		845	5035
20	2	7	Edgaras Benkunskas	Lithuania	15.04		845	4757
21	1	7	Alberto Nonino	Italy	15.15		831	4659
	1	2	Johannes Erm	Estonia	Did not start			
	2		Zsombor Gálpál	Hungary	Did not start			

=== Discus throw ===
Rank	Group	Name	Nationality	#1	#2	#3	Result	Notes	Points	Total
1	B	Leo Neugebauer	Germany	54.31	54.16	52.15	54.31	CDB, SB	961	6301
2	A	Karel Tilga	Estonia	48.27	48.45	49.14	49.14		852	5887
3	A	Niklas Kaul	Germany	48.78	47.56	48.88	48.88		847	5943
4	B	Jip De Greef	Netherlands	47.42	x	x	47.42		817	5633
5	B	Edgaras Benkunskas	Lithuania	43.33	46.56	x	46.56		799	5556
6	A	Risto Lillemets	Estonia	46.37	x	x	46.37		795	5773
7	A	Jeff Tesselaar	Netherlands	44.30	x	45.26	45.26		772	6076
8	A	Rasmus Roosleht	Estonia	41.20	45.19	44.49	45.19		771	5839
9	A	Luuk Pelkmans	Netherlands	43.29	44.35	44.47	44.47	PB	756	5803
10	A	Dario Dester	Italy	39.80	43.81	x	43.81		742	5819
11	B	Amadeus Gräber	Germany	43.44	42.45	41.92	43.44		735	5766
12	A	Andrin Huber	Switzerland	34.13	x	43.39	43.39		734	5801
13	A	Leon Krummenacher	Switzerland	x	43.34	40.93	43.34		733	5261
14	B	Sander Skotheim	Norway	43.23	x	42.21	43.23		730	6023
15	B	Vilém Stráský	Czech Republic	x	x	42.60	42.60		718	5827
16	A	Emil Uhlin	Sweden	40.99	42.49	x	42.49		715	5491
17	B	Makenson Gletty	France	40.01	41.60	40.35	41.60		697	5971
18	A	Nino Portmann	Switzerland	x	41.13	x	41.13		688	5775
19	B	Antoine Ferranti	France	36.72	x	39.24	39.24		649	5643
20	B	Dai Keïta	Belgium	39.04	x	36.30	39.04		645	5621
21	B	Alberto Nonino	Italy	38.71	x	37.65	38.71		638	5297

=== Pole vault ===
Rank	Group	Name	Nationality	4.00	4.10	4.20	4.30	4.40	4.50	4.60	4.70	4.80	4.90	5.00	5.10	5.20	Result	Notes	Points	Total
1	B	Amadeus Gräber	Germany	−	−	−	−	−	−	o	o	o	o	o	o	xxx	5.10		941	6707
2	B	Sander Skotheim	Norway	−	−	−	−	−	−	−	o	−	o	o	xxx		5.00	=SB	910	6933
2	A	Emil Uhlin	Sweden	−	−	−	−	−	−	o	−	o	−	o	xxx		5.00	SB	910	6401
4	A	Leon Krummenacher	Switzerland	−	−	−	−	−	−	o	−	xxo	xo	xo	xxx		5.00	=PB	910	6171
5	B	Dai Keïta	Belgium	−	−	−	−	−	−	xxo	−	−	xxo	xo	xxx		5.00		910	6531
6	B	Antoine Ferranti	France	−	−	−	−	−	−	xo	xo	xo	o	xxo	xxx		5.00		910	6553
7	A	Niklas Kaul	Germany	−	−	−	−	−	−	o	xo	o	o	xxx			4.90	=SB	880	6823
7	B	Alberto Nonino	Italy	−	−	−	−	−	−	xo	−	−	o	xxx			4.90		880	6177
9	B	Leo Neugebauer	Germany	−	−	−	−	−	−	xo	o	xxo	o	xxx			4.90		880	7181
9	A	Karel Tilga	Estonia	−	−	−	−	−	o	o	xo	xxo	o	xxx			4.90	SB	880	6767
11	A	Rasmus Roosleht	Estonia	−	−	−	−	o	o	o	o	o	xxx				4.80		849	6688
12	B	Jip De Greef	Netherlands	−	−	−	−	−	−	−	−	xo	−	xxx			4.80		849	6482
13	A	Risto Lillemets	Estonia	−	−	−	−	−	−	xo	xo	xo	xxx				4.80		849	6622
14	A	Jeff Tesselaar	Netherlands	−	−	−	−	o	o	o	xo	xxx					4.70		819	6895
15	A	Andrin Huber	Switzerland	−	−	−	−	−	−	o	xxx						4.60		790	6591
16	B	Makenson Gletty	France	−	−	−	−	−	−	xo	−	xxx					4.60		790	6761
17	B	Vilém Stráský	Czech Republic	−	−	−	−	−	o	−	xxx						4.50		760	6587
18	A	Edgaras Benkunskas	Lithuania	−	−	−	xo	o	o	xxx							4.50		760	6316
19	A	Dario Dester	Italy	−	−	−	−	−	xo	−	xr						4.50		760	6579
20	A	Nino Portmann	Switzerland	o	o	o	xo	o	xxx								4.40		731	6506
	A	Luuk Pelkmans	Netherlands	−	−	−	−	−	xxx								NM		0	5803

=== Javelin throw ===
Rank	Group	Name	Nationality	#1	#2	#3	Result	Notes	Points	Total
1	B	Niklas Kaul	Germany	73.54	x	r	73.54		943	7766
2	B	Rasmus Roosleht	Estonia	63.24	63.76	64.58	64.58		807	7495
3	A	Antoine Ferranti	France	59.37	55.61	60.23	60.23	SB	741	7294
4	B	Andrin Huber	Switzerland	59.05	57.43	60.11	60.11		739	7330
5	B	Leo Neugebauer	Germany	60.10	49.26	55.18	60.10	SB	739	7920
6	B	Makenson Gletty	France	54.54	60.07	x	60.07		739	7500
7	B	Karel Tilga	Estonia	60.05	58.03	x	60.05		739	7506
8	B	Amadeus Gräber	Germany	60.03	58.77	58.40	60.03		738	7445
9	A	Dario Dester	Italy	57.94	57.44	59.52	59.52	SB	731	7310
10	B	Sander Skotheim	Norway	58.88	58.51	59.43	59.43	SB	729	7662
11	A	Edgaras Benkunskas	Lithuania	53.33	59.13	57.39	59.13		725	7041
12	B	Vilém Stráský	Czech Republic	47.66	54.02	58.25	58.25	PB	712	7299
13	A	Leon Krummenacher	Switzerland	56.63	r		56.63		687	6858
14	A	Nino Portmann	Switzerland	55.70	56.26	55.85	56.26		682	7188
15	A	Risto Lillemets	Estonia	55.89	x	49.54	55.89		676	7298
16	B	Jeff Tesselaar	Netherlands	53.80	52.39	52.51	53.80	SB	645	7540
17	A	Dai Keïta	Belgium	50.60	53.36	51.54	53.36		638	7169
18	A	Emil Uhlin	Sweden	49.48	x	52.22	52.22		622	7023
19	A	Alberto Nonino	Italy	47.69	47.30	49.92	49.92		587	6764
20	A	Jip De Greef	Netherlands	47.77	r		47.77		556	7038
21	B	Luuk Pelkmans	Netherlands	Did not start						

=== 1500 metres ===
Rank	Name	Nationality	Time	Notes	Points
1	Antoine Ferranti	France	4:15.81		840
2	Jeff Tesselaar	Netherlands	4:16.13	SB	838
3	Andrin Huber	Switzerland	4:20.61	SB	807
4	Niklas Kaul	Germany	4:20.70	SB	807
5	Emil Uhlin	Sweden	4:23.75		786
6	Karel Tilga	Estonia	4:24.65	SB	780
7	Sander Skotheim	Norway	4:25.99	SB	771
8	Makenson Gletty	France	4:26.11	SB	770
9	Leon Krummenacher	Switzerland	4:29.89	PB	745
10	Alberto Nonino	Italy	4:32.11		731
11	Risto Lillemets	Estonia	4:32.53	SB	728
12	Dario Dester	Italy	4:33.49		722
13	Amadeus Gräber	Germany	4:34.25	SB	717
14	Vilém Stráský	Czech Republic	4:34.63		714
15	Jip De Greef	Netherlands	4:35.24	PB	711
16	Dai Keïta	Belgium	4:35.49		709
17	Rasmus Roosleht	Estonia	4:36.34		704
18	Nino Portmann	Switzerland	4:36.82	SB	700
19	Leo Neugebauer	Germany	4:38.36	SB	691
20	Edgaras Benkunskas	Lithuania	4:45.25	SB	648

=== Overall standings ===
The standings were as follows (after 10 out of 10 events):

The highest mark recorded in each event is highlighted in yellow

Place	Athlete	Nation	100m	LJ	SP	HJ	400m	110mh	DT	PV	JT	1500m	Total	Notes
1st place, gold medalist(s)	Leo Neugebauer	Germany	10.90; 883	7.82; 1015	17.13; 921	1.99; 794	48.81; 870	14.94; 857	54.31; 961	4.90; 880	60.10; 739	4:38.36; 691	8611	
2nd place, silver medalist(s)	Niklas Kaul	Germany	11.23; 810	7.22; 866	15.26; 806	2.02; 822	47.99; 910	14.73; 882	48.88; 847	4.90; 880	73.54; 943	4:20.70; 807	8573	SB
3rd place, bronze medalist(s)	Sander Skotheim	Norway	10.95; 872	7.80; 1010	14.45; 756	2.05; 850	48.31; 894	14.50; 911	43.23; 730	5.00; 910	59.43; 729	4:25.99; 771	8433	SB
4	Jeff Tesselaar	Netherlands	10.75; 917	7.67; 977	15.11; 796	1.96; 767	47.06; 955	14.65; 892	45.26; 772	4.70; 819	53.80; 645	4:16.13; 838	8378	PB
5	Karel Tilga	Estonia	11.22; 812	7.28; 881	15.46; 818	2.02; 822	49.10; 857	15.04; 845	49.14; 852	4.90; 880	60.05; 739	4:24.65; 780	8286	
6	Makenson Gletty	France	10.80; 906	7.20; 862	15.65; 830	2.02; 822	48.12; 903	14.18; 951	41.60; 697	4.60; 790	60.07; 739	4:26.11; 770	8270	
7	Rasmus Roosleht	Estonia	10.91; 881	6.95; 802	15.88; 844	1.93; 740	47.84; 917	14.72; 884	45.19; 771	4.80; 849	64.58; 807	4:36.34; 704	8199	
8	Amadeus Gräber	Germany	10.79; 908	7.23; 869	13.29; 685	1.99; 794	48.31; 894	14.74; 881	43.44; 735	5.10; 941	60.03; 738	4:34.25; 717	8162	
9	Andrin Huber	Switzerland	10.98; 865	7.06; 828	14.62; 766	1.96; 767	48.11; 904	14.29; 937	43.39; 734	4.60; 790	60.11; 739	4:20.61; 807	8137	SB
10	Antoine Ferranti	France	11.37; 780	7.39; 908	13.09; 673	2.05; 850	48.22; 899	14.72; 884	39.24; 649	5.00; 910	60.23; 741	4:15.81; 840	8134	
11	Dario Dester	Italy	10.84; 897	7.12; 842	14.48; 758	1.99; 794	47.96; 911	14.79; 875	43.81; 742	4.50; 760	59.52; 731	4:33.49; 722	8032	
12	Risto Lillemets	Estonia	11.09; 841	6.97; 807	15.47; 819	1.96; 767	49.23; 850	14.64; 894	46.37; 795	4.80; 849	55.89; 676	4:32.53; 728	8026	
13	Vilém Stráský	Czech Republic	10.88; 888	7.54; 945	14.10; 734	1.93; 740	48.45; 887	14.47; 915	42.60; 718	4.50; 760	58.25; 712	4:34.63; 714	8013	
14	Nino Portmann	Switzerland	10.69; 931	7.43; 918	14.00; 728	1.87; 687	48.06; 906	14.45; 917	41.13; 688	4.40; 731	56.26; 682	4:36.82; 700	7888	
15	Dai Keïta	Belgium	10.90; 883	7.33; 893	12.77; 653	1.96; 767	47.97; 911	14.84; 869	39.04; 645	5.00; 910	53.36; 638	4:35.49; 709	7878	
16	Emil Uhlin	Sweden	11.27; 801	6.72; 748	13.12; 675	2.05; 850	49.11; 856	15.03; 846	42.49; 715	5.00; 910	52.22; 622	4:23.75; 786	7809	
17	Jip De Greef	Netherlands	11.12; 834	7.02; 818	13.40; 692	1.96; 767	49.76; 826	14.76; 879	47.42; 817	4.80; 849	47.77; 556	4:35.24; 711	7749	
18	Edgaras Benkunskas	Lithuania	11.27; 801	6.90; 790	14.85; 780	1.93; 740	50.29; 801	15.04; 845	46.56; 799	4.50; 760	59.13; 725	4:45.25; 648	7689	
19	Leon Krummenacher	Switzerland	11.36; 782	6.91; 697	13.47; 696	1.87; 687	50.30; 801	14.87; 865	43.34; 733	5.00; 910	56.63; 687	4:29.89; 745	7603	
20	Alberto Nonino	Italy	11.16; 825	6.91; 792	11.53; 578	1.93; 740	48.33; 893	15.15; 831	38.71; 638	4.90; 880	49.92; 587	4:32.11; 731	7495	
	Luuk Pelkmans	Netherlands	11.28; 799	7.44; 920	15.16; 800	2.02; 822	49.18; 853	14.97; 853	44.47; 756	NM; 0	DNS			DNF
	Johannes Erm	Estonia	10.88; 888	7.49; 932	14.55; 762	1.99; 794	48.07; 906	DNS						DNF
	Zsombor Gálpál	Hungary	10.96; 870	6.46; 688	14.56; 763	1.87; 687	48.42; 889	DNS						DNF
	Ondřej Kopecký	Czech Republic	11.21; 814	7.10; 838	13.09; 673	1.84; 661	DNS							DNF
	Tomas Järvinen	Czech Republic	10.82; 901	7.18; 857	DNS									DNF
