= 2024 European Athletics Championships – Men's decathlon =

Men's decathlon at the 2024 European Athletics Championships
- Venue: Stadio Olimpico
- Location: Rome
- Dates: 10 June; 11 June
- Competitors: 24 from 14 nations
- Winning points: 8764

Medalists
gold medal	Johannes Erm	Estonia
silver medal	Sander Skotheim	Norway
bronze medal	Makenson Gletty	France

The men's decathlon at the 2024 European Athletics Championships took place at the Stadio Olimpico on 10 and 11 June.

== Records ==
Standing records prior to the 2024 European Athletics Championships
World record	Kevin Mayer (FRA)	9126 pts	Talence, France	16 September 2018
European record	Kevin Mayer (FRA)	9126 pts	Talence, France	16 September 2018
Championship record	Daley Thompson (GBR)	8811 pts	Stuttgart, West Germany	28 August 1986
World Leading	Ayden Owens-Delerme (PUR)	8732 pts	Walnut, California, United States	18 April 2024
Europe Leading	Leo Neugebauer (GER)	8708 pts	Austin, Texas, United States	28 March 2024

== Schedule ==
Date	Time	Round
10 June 2024	10:05	100 metres
10 June 2024	11:05	Long jump
10 June 2024	13:05	Shot put
10 June 2024	19:30	High jump
10 June 2024	22:20	400 metres
11 June 2024	09:35	110 metres hurdles
11 June 2024	10:30	Discus throw
11 June 2024	11:55	Pole vault
11 June 2024	19:05	Javelin throw
11 June 2024	22:25	1500 metres

All times are local times (UTC+2)

== Results ==
=== 100 metres ===
Wind:
Heat 1: -0.5 m/s, Heat 2: -0.4 m/s, Heat 3: +0.4 m/s

Rank	Heat	Lane	Name	Nationality	Time	Notes	Points
1	3	2	Makenson Gletty	France	10.55	PB	963
2	3	8	Manuel Eitel	Germany	10.58	SB	956
3	3	9	Johannes Erm	Estonia	10.60	PB	952
4	3	5	Vilém Stráský	Czech Republic	10.65	PB	940
5	3	6	Finley Gaio	Switzerland	10.71		926
6	3	7	Kevin Mayer	France	10.72	SB	924
7	1	7	Dario Dester	Italy	10.76	=PB	915
8	3	4	Felix Wolter	Germany	10.76		915
9	2	4	Sander Skotheim	Norway	10.82	SB	901
10	2	8	Jeff Tesselaar	Netherlands	10.85	SB	894
11	2	9	Markus Rooth	Norway	10.89	SB	885
12	2	7	Jente Hauttekeete	Belgium	10.91	SB	881
12	2	5	Téo Bastien	France	10.91	SB	881
14	2	6	Zsombor Gálpál	Hungary	10.91	SB	881
15	1	9	Janek Õiglane	Estonia	10.97	SB	867
16	1	2	Risto Lillemets	Estonia	11.03		854
17	2	3	Paweł Wiesiołek	Poland	11.04	SB	852
18	3	3	Lorenzo Naidon	Italy	11.05	SB	850
19	2	2	Angelos-Tzanis Andreoglou	Greece	11.07		845
20	1	6	Edgaras Benkunskas	Lithuania	11.17		823
21	1	8	Tim Nowak	Germany	11.30		795
22	1	5	Niklas Kaul	Germany	11.34	SB	786
23	1	4	Thomas Van der Plaetsen	Belgium	11.52	SB	748
24	1	3	Darko Pešić	Montenegro	11.58	SB	736

=== Long jump ===
Rank	Group	Name	Nationality	#1	#2	#3	Result	Notes	Points	Total
1	A	Markus Rooth	Norway	7.79	x	8.01	8.01	PB	1063	1948
2	A	Sander Skotheim	Norway	7.93	x	–	7.93		1043	1944
3	A	Johannes Erm	Estonia	7.91	7.70	7.57	7.91	SB	1038	1990
4	A	Jeff Tesselaar	Netherlands	7.54	7.76	x	7.76	PB	1000	1894
5	A	Felix Wolter	Germany	7.48	7.67	7.48	7.67		977	1892
6	B	Makenson Gletty	France	7.40	7.07	7.59	7.59	PB	963	1920
7	B	Tim Nowak	Germany	7.48	7.22	7.33	7.48	=PB	930	1725
8	A	Thomas Van der Plaetsen	Belgium	7.47	x	r	7.47		927	1675
9	A	Téo Bastien	France	7.46	7.39	7.35	7.46		925	1806
10	A	Finley Gaio	Switzerland	x	5.71	7.45	7.45		922	1848
11	B	Niklas Kaul	Germany	6.99	7.24	7.44	7.44	PB	920	1706
12	A	Vilém Stráský	Czech Republic	7.30	7.30	7.37	7.37		903	1843
13	A	Kevin Mayer	France	7.37	r		7.37		903	1827
14	B	Paweł Wiesiołek	Poland	7.01	7.35	6.92	7.35		898	1750
15	A	Janek Õiglane	Estonia	7.34	6.98	–	7.34	SB	896	1763
16	B	Dario Dester	Italy	7.12	7.32	7.29	7.32	SB	891	1806
17	B	Manuel Eitel	Germany	7.22	7.28	7.01	7.28	SB	881	1837
18	A	Lorenzo Naidon	Italy	7.09	7.14	7.18	7.18		857	1707
19	B	Edgaras Benkunskas	Lithuania	7.17	6.68	6.98	7.17	SB	854	1677
20	B	Risto Lillemets	Estonia	7.16	7.03	x	7.16	SB	852	1706
21	B	Angelos-Tzanis Andreoglou	Greece	x	x	7.05	7.05		826	1671
22	A	Jente Hauttekeete	Belgium	7.04	7.01	7.03	7.04		823	1704
23	B	Darko Pešić	Montenegro	x	6.46	6.98	6.98	SB	809	1545
24	B	Zsombor Gálpál	Hungary	6.87	6.73	6.84	6.87		783	1664

=== Shot put ===
Rank	Group	Name	Nationality	#1	#2	#3	Result	Notes	Points	Total
1	A	Makenson Gletty	France	16.27	x	x	16.27		868	2788
2	A	Kevin Mayer	France	x	15.31	15.00	15.31		809	2636
3	A	Markus Rooth	Norway	15.27	x	15.17	15.27		806	2754
4	A	Manuel Eitel	Germany	14.58	15.25	x	15.25	SB	805	2642
5	A	Niklas Kaul	Germany	14.48	14.95	15.10	15.10	SB	796	2502
6	A	Johannes Erm	Estonia	14.25	14.49	14.99	14.99		789	2779
7	B	Vilém Stráský	Czech Republic	14.02	14.95	x	14.95	PB	787	2630
8	A	Edgaras Benkunskas	Lithuania	12.84	14.92	x	14.92		785	2462
9	A	Janek Õiglane	Estonia	13.68	13.89	14.75	14.75	SB	775	2538
10	A	Darko Pešić	Montenegro	x	x	14.67	14.67		769	2314
11	B	Jente Hauttekeete	Belgium	13.93	13.77	14.57	14.57	SB	763	2467
12	A	Paweł Wiesiołek	Poland	14.24	x	14.24	14.24		743	2493
13	B	Risto Lillemets	Estonia	13.58	14.22	x	14.22		742	2448
14	B	Finley Gaio	Switzerland	12.74	13.03	14.15	14.15	SB	738	2586
15	B	Thomas Van der Plaetsen	Belgium	x	14.10	14.13	14.13		736	2411
16	A	Tim Nowak	Germany	13.49	14.12	13.66	14.12		736	2461
17	B	Sander Skotheim	Norway	13.16	13.91	13.96	13.96		726	2670
18	A	Zsombor Gálpál	Hungary	13.86	13.86	x	13.86		720	2384
19	B	Jeff Tesselaar	Netherlands	13.09	13.53	x	13.53		700	2594
20	B	Téo Bastien	France	12.96	13.40	13.40	13.40		692	2498
21	B	Felix Wolter	Germany	12.27	13.11	12.81	13.11		674	2566
22	B	Angelos-Tzanis Andreoglou	Greece	12.59	11.90	x	12.59		642	2313
23	B	Dario Dester	Italy	12.43	x	11.87	12.43		633	2439
24	B	Lorenzo Naidon	Italy	11.85	x	11.94	11.94		603	2310

=== High jump ===
Rank	Group	Name	Nationality	1.72	1.75	1.78	1.81	1.84	1.87	1.90	1.93	1.96	1.99	2.02	2.05	2.08	2.11	2.14	2.17	2.20	Result	Notes	Points	Total
1	A	Sander Skotheim	Norway	–	–	–	–	–	–	–	–	–	o	–	o	–	o	o	xxo	xxx	2.17	SB	963	3633
2	A	Jente Hauttekeete	Belgium	–	–	–	–	–	–	–	o	–	xo	o	xxo	xxo	xxx				2.08		878	3345
3	A	Tim Nowak	Germany	–	–	–	–	–	–	–	o	–	xo	o	xxo	xxo	xxx				2.08		878	3345
4	B	Dario Dester	Italy	–	–	–	–	xo	o	xo	xxo	o	xo	o	xxx						2.02	SB	822	3261
4	B	Makenson Gletty	France	–	–	–	–	–	–	o	o	xo	o	xo	xxx						2.02	SB	822	3610
6	A	Edgaras Benkunskas	Lithuania	–	–	–	–	–	–	o	–	xo	xxo	xo	xxx						2.02		822	3284
7	B	Markus Rooth	Norway	–	–	–	–	–	–	–	–	o	o	xxx							1.99	SB	794	3548
8	A	Lorenzo Naidon	Italy	–	–	–	–	o	–	xo	o	o	o	xxx							1.99		794	3104
9	A	Johannes Erm	Estonia	–	–	–	–	o	–	o	xo	xo	o	xxx							1.99		794	3573
10	A	Téo Bastien	France	–		–	–	–	–	o	–	xo	xxo	xxx							1.99		794	3292
11	A	Risto Lillemets	Estonia	–	–	–	–	–	–	o	o	xxo	xxo	xxx							1.99	SB	794	3242
12	A	Niklas Kaul	Germany	–	–	–	–	–	–	–	xo	o	xxx								1.96	SB	767	3269
13	A	Thomas Van der Plaetsen	Belgium	–	–	–	–	–	–	–	–	xo	–	xxx							1.96	SB	767	3178
14	B	Felix Wolter	Germany	–	–	–	–	–	o	–	xo	xo	xxx								1.96		767	3333
14	A	Kevin Mayer	France	–	–	–	–	–	–	o	xo	xo	xxx								1.96	SB	767	3403
16	B	Jeff Tesselaar	Netherlands	–	–	–	o	–	o	o	o	xxo	xxx								1.96		767	3361
17	A	Darko Pešić	Montenegro	–	–	–	–	o	o	o	xo	xxo	xxx								1.96	SB	767	3081
18	B	Manuel Eitel	Germany	–	–	–	–	–	xo	o	xo	xxo	xxx								1.96	SB	767	3409
19	B	Paweł Wiesiołek	Poland	–	–	–	o	–	o	o	xxx										1.90		714	3207
19	B	Vilém Stráský	Czech Republic	–	–	–	–	o	–	o	xxx										1.90		714	3344
19	B	Angelos-Tzanis Andreoglou	Greece	–	–	o	–	o	o	o	xxx										1.90	=SB	714	3027
22	B	Finley Gaio	Switzerland	–	–	o	–	xo	xo	xxo	xxx										1.90	SB	714	3300
23	B	Janek Õiglane	Estonia	–	–	–	–	o	r												1.84	SB	661	3199
24	B	Zsombor Gálpál	Hungary	–	o	o	xo	o	xxx												1.84		661	3045

=== 400 metres ===
Rank	Heat	Lane	Name	Nationality	Time	Notes	Points	Total
1	3	7	Johannes Erm	Estonia	46.81	PB	968	4541
2	3	5	Sander Skotheim	Norway	47.50	PB	933	4566
3	2	6	Makenson Gletty	France	47.60	PB	929	4539
4	3	6	Felix Wolter	Germany	47.65	SB	926	4259
5	3	9	Jeff Tesselaar	Netherlands	47.77	PB	920	4281
6	3	3	Markus Rooth	Norway	48.03	PB	908	4456
7	2	8	Zsombor Gálpál	Hungary	48.31	PB	894	3939
8	1	3	Dario Dester	Italy	48.43	SB	888	4149
9	3	8	Finley Gaio	Switzerland	48.47	SB	886	4186
10	2	9	Jente Hauttekeete	Belgium	48.63	PB	879	4224
11	3	4	Niklas Kaul	Germany	48.81	SB	870	4139
12	3	2	Manuel Eitel	Germany	49.02	SB	860	4269
13	2	7	Vilém Stráský	Czech Republic	49.17		853	4197
14	1	8	Angelos-Tzanis Andreoglou	Greece	49.32	PB	846	3873
15	2	4	Risto Lillemets	Estonia	49.69		829	4071
16	1	4	Kevin Mayer	France	49.73	SB	827	4230
17	1	7	Téo Bastien	France	49.78		825	4117
18	2	5	Paweł Wiesiołek	Poland	50.03	SB	813	4020
19	2	3	Tim Nowak	Germany	50.23		804	4087
20	1	6	Edgaras Benkunskas	Lithuania	50.58	SB	788	4072
21	2	2	Lorenzo Naidon	Italy	50.70	SB	783	3887
22	1	5	Thomas Van der Plaetsen	Belgium	50.72	SB	782	3960
23	1	9	Darko Pešić	Montenegro	51.58	SB	743	3824
			Janek Õiglane	Estonia	DNS			

=== 110 metres hurdles ===
Wind:
Heat 1: +1.3 m/s, Heat 2: -0.5 m/s, Heat 3: 0.0 m/s, Rerun: +0.7 m/s

Rank	Heat	Lane	Name	Nationality	Time	Notes	Points	Total
1	Rerun	9	Makenson Gletty	France	13.88	PB	990	5529
2	3	5	Finley Gaio	Switzerland	14.04		969	5155
3	3	8	Vilém Stráský	Czech Republic	14.24		944	5141
4	1	3	Dario Dester	Italy	14.28	SB	939	5088
5	3	2	Kevin Mayer	France	14.29	SB	937	5167
6	3	6	Sander Skotheim	Norway	14.30	SB	936	5502
7	2	6	Johannes Erm	Estonia	14.30		936	5477
8	2	8	Téo Bastien	France	14.40	SB	924	5047
9	3	4	Jente Hauttekeete	Belgium	14.41		922	5146
10	3	3	Felix Wolter	Germany	14.41		922	5181
11	2	7	Manuel Eitel	Germany	14.49	SB	912	5181
12	3	7	Lorenzo Naidon	Italy	14.54	SB	906	4793
13	2	3	Markus Rooth	Norway	14.59	SB	900	5356
14	1	6	Jeff Tesselaar	Netherlands	14.61	SB	897	5178
15	2	2	Tim Nowak	Germany	14.67		890	4977
16	1	4	Edgaras Benkunskas	Lithuania	14.70		886	4958
17	1	7	Thomas Van der Plaetsen	Belgium	14.75	SB	880	4840
18	2	5	Angelos-Tzanis Andreoglou	Greece	14.78		876	4749
19	2	9	Niklas Kaul	Germany	14.91		860	4999
20	2	4	Zsombor Gálpál	Hungary	15.08		840	4779
21	1	8	Paweł Wiesiołek	Poland	15.37		805	4825
22	1	5	Darko Pešić	Montenegro	15.43	SB	798	4622
23	1	2	Risto Lillemets	Estonia	DNF		0	4071

=== Discus throw ===
Rank	Group	Name	Nationality	#1	#2	#3	Result	Notes	Points	Total
1	B	Niklas Kaul	Germany	47.04	46.85	49.89	49.89	PB	868	5867
2	A	Kevin Mayer	France	47.77	48.53	x	48.53	SB	840	6007
3	A	Thomas Van der Plaetsen	Belgium	47.37	46.53	44.85	47.37	SB	816	5656
4	A	Markus Rooth	Norway	x	45.89	46.54	46.54	SB	799	6155
5	A	Sander Skotheim	Norway	44.51	x	46.18	46.18		791	6293
6	B	Jeff Tesselaar	Netherlands	42.71	44.50	46.13	46.13	PB	790	5968
7	B	Felix Wolter	Germany	x	45.40	x	45.40	PB	775	5956
7	A	Risto Lillemets	Estonia	45.40	x	x	45.40	SB	775	4846
9	B	Edgaras Benkunskas	Lithuania	43.59	44.12	45.02	45.02		767	5725
10	B	Darko Pešić	Montenegro	44.78	43.15	x	44.78		762	5384
11	A	Johannes Erm	Estonia	42.90	44.56	x	44.56		758	6235
12	B	Paweł Wiesiołek	Poland	43.27	44.23	43.89	44.23		751	5576
13	B	Manuel Eitel	Germany	42.52	43.13	43.98	43.98		746	5927
14	A	Téo Bastien	France	43.55	x	41.50	43.55		737	5778
15	A	Makenson Gletty	France	42.73	43.54	x	43.54		737	6266
16	A	Tim Nowak	Germany	42.25	41.91	x	42.25		710	5687
17	A	Finley Gaio	Switzerland	41.07	42.11	41.57	42.11	SB	708	5863
18	A	Dario Dester	Italy	39.58	39.99	41.00	41.00	SB	685	5773
19	B	Zsombor Gálpál	Hungary	x	40.64	40.12	40.64		678	5457
20	B	Vilém Stráský	Czech Republic	39.71	38.86	40.08	40.08	SB	666	5807
21	A	Jente Hauttekeete	Belgium	39.87	x	x	39.87		662	5808
22	A	Angelos-Tzanis Andreoglou	Greece	39.69	x	x	39.69		658	5407
23	A	Lorenzo Naidon	Italy	37.54	x	x	37.54		615	5408

=== Pole vault ===
Rank	Group	Name	Nationality	4.10	4.20	4.30	4.40	4.50	4.60	4.70	4.80	4.90	5.00	5.10	5.20	5.30	5.40	Result	Notes	Points	Total
1	A	Kevin Mayer	France	–	–	–	–	–	–	–	–	–	xxo	–	o	o	r	5.30	SB	1004	7011
2	A	Johannes Erm	Estonia	–	–	–	–	–	–	o	–	o	xxo	o	o			5.20	PB	972	7207
3	A	Markus Rooth	Norway	–	–	–	–	–	–	–	xo	o	o	xo	xr			5.10	=PB	941	7096
4	A	Thomas Van der Plaetsen	Belgium	–	–	–	–	–	–	–	–	–	xo	–	xxx			5.00	SB	910	6566
5	B	Manuel Eitel	Germany	–	–	–	–	xo	o	o	o	xxo	xo	xxx				5.00		910	6837
6	A	Jente Hauttekeete	Belgium	–	–	–	–	–	–	xo	o	xo	xxo	xxx				5.00		910	6718
7	A	Lorenzo Naidon	Italy	–	–	–	–	–	–	o	–	o	xxx					4.90		880	6288
7	A	Dario Dester	Italy	–	–	–	–	–	–	o	–	o	xxx					4.90		880	6653
7	A	Téo Bastien	France	–	–	–	o	–	o	–	o	o	xxx					4.90		880	6658
10	B	Makenson Gletty	France	–	–	–	–	–	xxo	–	o	o	xxx					4.90		880	7146
10	A	Tim Nowak	Germany	–	–	–	–	xo	–	o	xo	o	xxx					4.90		880	6567
12	B	Niklas Kaul	Germany	–	–	–	–	–	–	xo	xxo	xo	xr					4.90	SB	880	6746
13	A	Finley Gaio	Switzerland	–	–	–	o	xo	xo	xo	xo	xxo	xxx					4.90		880	6743
14	B	Vilém Stráský	Czech Republic	–	–	–	o	–	o	–	xo	xxx						4.80		849	6656
15	B	Felix Wolter	Germany	–	–	–	–	o	o	xxx								4.60		790	6746
15	A	Angelos-Tzanis Andreoglou	Greece	–	–	–	o	o	o	xxx								4.60		790	6197
15	B	Edgaras Benkunskas	Lithuania	o	–	o	–	o	o	xxx								4.60		790	6515
18	B	Paweł Wiesiołek	Poland	–	–	–	xo	o	o	xxx								4.60		790	6366
19	A	Sander Skotheim	Norway	–	–	–	xxo	–	o	–	xxx							4.60		790	7083
20	B	Jeff Tesselaar	Netherlands	o	o	–	xxx											4.20		673	6641
21	B	Darko Pešić	Montenegro	–	xxo	–	xxr											4.20	SB	673	6057
22	B	Zsombor Gálpál	Hungary	xo	–	xxx												4.10		645	6102
	A	Risto Lillemets	Estonia															DNS			

=== Javelin throw ===
Rank	Group	Name	Nationality	#1	#2	#3	Result	Notes	Points	Total
1	A	Niklas Kaul	Germany	75.45	73.56	r	75.45	SB	973	7720
2	A	Kevin Mayer	France	69.54	67.02	r	69.54	SB	882	7893
3	A	Thomas Van der Plaetsen	Belgium	62.53	64.93	68.45	68.45	SB	866	7432
4	B	Dario Dester	Italy	63.17	63.66	x	63.66	PB	793	7446
5	A	Johannes Erm	Estonia	55.67	57.36	62.71	62.71	PB	779	7986
6	A	Tim Nowak	Germany	47.80	62.64	r	62.64	SB	778	7345
7	A	Zsombor Gálpál	Hungary	55.60	56.59	61.93	61.93	PB	767	6869
7	A	Sander Skotheim	Norway	55.24	61.27	58.73	61.27	SB	757	7840
9	A	Edgaras Benkunskas	Lithuania	57.13	57.57	61.26	61.26		757	7272
10	A	Makenson Gletty	France	55.65	57.47	56.69	57.47	SB	700	7846
11	A	Manuel Eitel	Germany	57.02	r		57.02	SB	693	7530
12	B	Jente Hauttekeete	Belgium	56.52	x	53.43	56.52	PB	686	7404
13	B	Vilém Stráský	Czech Republic	52.02	56.47	x	56.47	SB	885	7341
14	B	Paweł Wiesiołek	Poland	51.81	56.11	x	56.11	SB	679	7045
15	A	Darko Pešić	Montenegro	55.68	x	x	55.68	SB	673	6730
16	B	Téo Bastien	France	55.17	53.53	53.09	55.17		665	7323
17	A	Felix Wolter	Germany	53.65	53.61	x	53.65		643	7389
18	B	Angelos-Tzanis Andreoglou	Greece	51.56	50.67	45.31	51.56		612	6809
19	B	Jeff Tesselaar	Netherlands	46.62	49.69	51.05	51.05	PB	604	7245
20	B	Lorenzo Naidon	Italy	49.11	x	50.17	50.17	SB	591	6879
21	B	Finley Gaio	Switzerland	47.76	42.61	47.26	47.76		556	7299
	A	Markus Rooth	Norway	DNS						

=== 1500 metres ===
Rank	Name	Nationality	Time	Notes	Points	Total
1	Jeff Tesselaar	Netherlands	4:16.77		834	8079
2	Niklas Kaul	Germany	4:17.77	SB	827	8547
3	Tim Nowak	Germany	4:21.02		805	8150
4	Sander Skotheim	Norway	4:22.41	SB	795	8635
5	Dario Dester	Italy	4:23.36		789	8235
6	Johannes Erm	Estonia	4:24.95	SB	778	8764
7	Makenson Gletty	France	4:27.70	SB	760	8606
8	Jente Hauttekeete	Belgium	4:28.85		752	8156
9	Angelos-Tzanis Andreoglou	Greece	4:28.86		752	7561
10	Vilém Stráský	Czech Republic	4:29.70		747	8088
11	Darko Pešić	Montenegro	4:38.33	SB	691	7421
12	Manuel Eitel	Germany	4:39.33	SB	682	8212
13	Felix Wolter	Germany	4:42.90		662	8051
14	Paweł Wiesiołek	Poland	4:42.93	SB	662	7707
15	Zsombor Gálpál	Hungary	4:43.45		659	7528
16	Thomas Van der Plaetsen	Belgium	4:44.54	SB	652	8084
17	Lorenzo Naidon	Italy	4:46.48	SB	640	7519
18	Finley Gaio	Switzerland	4:47.32	SB	635	7934
19	Edgaras Benkunskas	Lithuania	4:51.44	SB	610	7882
20	Kevin Mayer	France	4:55.99	SB	583	8476
21	Téo Bastien	France	5:06.59		522	7845

== Final standings ==
The standings were as follows (after 10 out of 10 events):

The highest mark recorded in each event is highlighted in yellow

Rank	Athlete	Nationality	100m	LJ	SP	HJ	400m	110mh	DT	PV	JT	1500m	Total	Notes
1st place, gold medalist(s)	Johannes Erm	Estonia	952; 10.60	1038; 7.91	789; 14.99	794; 1.99	968; 46.81	936; 14.30	758; 44.56	972; 5.20	779; 62.71	778; 4:24.95	8764	PB
2nd place, silver medalist(s)	Sander Skotheim	Norway	901; 10.82	1043; 7.93	726; 13.96	963; 2.17	933; 47.50	936; 14.30	791; 46.18	790; 4.60	757; 61.27	795; 4:22.41	8635	EU23L
3rd place, bronze medalist(s)	Makenson Gletty	France	963; 10.55	957; 7.59	868; 16.27	822; 2.02	929; 47.60	990; 13.88	737; 43.54	880; 4.90	700; 57.47	760; 4:27.70	8606	PB
4	Niklas Kaul	Germany	786; 11.34	920; 7.44	796; 15.10	767; 1.96	870; 48.81	860; 14.91	868; 49.89	880; 4.90	973; 75.45	827; 4:17.77	8547	SB
5	Kevin Mayer	France	924; 10.72	903; 7.37	809; 15.31	767; 1.96	827; 49.73	937; 14.29	840; 48.53	1004; 5.30	882; 69.54	583; 4:55.99	8476	SB
6	Dario Dester	Italy	915; 10.76	891; 7.32	633; 12.43	822; 2.02	888; 48.43	939; 14.28	685; 41.00	880; 4.90	793; 63.66	789; 4:23.36	8235	NR
7	Manuel Eitel	Germany	956; 10.58	881; 7.28	805; 15.25	767; 1.96	860; 49.02	912; 14.49	746; 43.98	910; 5.00	693; 57.02	682; 4:39.66	8212	SB
8	Jente Hauttekeete	Belgium	881; 10.91	823; 7.04	763; 14.57	878; 2.08	879; 48.63	922; 14.41	662; 39.87	910; 5.00	686; 56.52	752; 4:28.85	8156	PB
9	Tim Nowak	Germany	795; 11.30	930; 7.48	736; 14.12	822; 2.02	804; 50.23	890; 14.67	710; 42.25	880; 4.90	778; 62.64	805; 4:21.02	8150	
10	Vilém Stráský	Czech Republic	940; 10.65	903; 7.37	787; 14.95	714; 1.90	853; 49.17	944; 14.24	666; 40.08	849; 4.80	685; 56.47	747; 4:29.70	8088	PB
11	Thomas Van der Plaetsen	Belgium	748; 11.52	927; 7.47	736; 14.13	767; 1.96	782; 50.72	880; 14.75	816; 47.37	910; 5.00	866; 68.45	652; 4:44.54	8084	SB
12	Jeff Tesselaar	Netherlands	894; 10.85	1000; 7.76	700; 13.53	767; 1.96	920; 47.77	897; 14.61	790; 46.13	673; 4.20	604; 51.05	834; 4:16.77	8079	PB
13	Felix Wolter	Germany	915; 10.76	977; 7.67	674; 13.11	767; 1.96	926; 47.65	922; 14.41	775; 45.40	790; 4.60	643; 53.65	662; 4:42.90	8051	
14	Finley Gaio	Switzerland	926; 10.71	922; 7.45	738; 14.15	714; 1.90	886; 49.17	969; 14.04	708; 42.11	880; 4.90	556; 47.76	635; 4:47.32	7934	SB
15	Edgaras Benkunskas	Lithuania	823; 11.17	854; 7.17	785; 14.92	822; 2.02	788; 50.23	886; 14.70	767; 45.02	790; 4.60	757; 61.26	610; 4:51.44	7882	
16	Téo Bastien	France	881; 10.91	925; 7.46	692; 13.40	794; 1.99	825; 49.78	924; 14.40	737; 43.55	880; 4.90	665; 55.17	522; 5:06.59	7845	
17	Paweł Wiesiołek	Poland	852; 11.04	898; 7.35	743; 14.24	714; 1.90	813; 50.03	805; 15.37	751; 44.23	790; 4.60	679; 56.11	662; 4:42.93	7707	SB
18	Angelos-Tzanis Andreoglou	Greece	845; 11.07	826; 7.05	642; 12.59	714; 1.90	846; 49.32	876; 14.78	658; 39.69	790; 4.60	612; 51.56	752; 4:28.86	7561	
19	Zsombor Gálpál	Hungary	881; 10.91	783; 6.87	720; 13.86	661; 1.84	894; 48.31	840; 15.08	678; 40.64	645; 4.10	767; 61.93	659; 4:43.45	7528	
20	Lorenzo Naidon	Italy	850; 11.05	857; 7.18	603; 11.94	794; 1.99	783; 50.70	906; 14.54	615; 37.54	880; 4.90	591; 50.17	640; 4:46.48	7519	SB
21	Darko Pešić	Montenegro	736; 11.58	809; 6.98	769; 14.67	767; 1.96	743; 51.58	798; 15.43	762; 44.78	673; 4.20	673; 55.68	691; 4:38.33	7421	SB
	Markus Rooth	Norway	885; 10.89	1063; 8.01	806; 15.27	794; 1.99	908; 48.03	900; 14.59	799; 46.54	941; 5.10	DNS			DNF
	Risto Lillemets	Estonia	854; 11.03	852; 7.16	742; 14.22	794; 1.99	829; 49.69	DNF	775; 45.40	DNS				DNF
	Janek Õiglane	Estonia	867; 10.97	896; 7.34	775; 14.76	661; 1.84	DNS							DNF
