= Amadeus Gräber =

German multi-event athlete

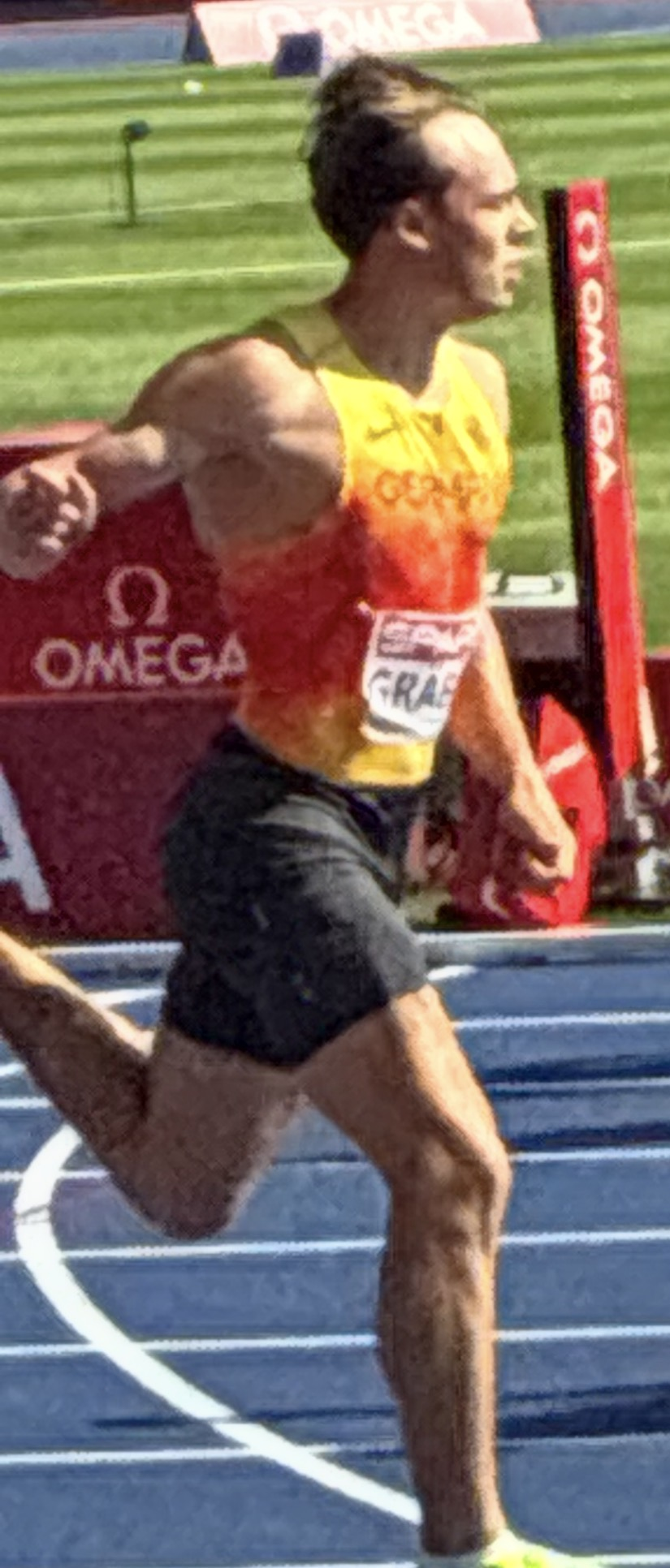
- Gräber in 2026

Personal information
- Born: 3 February 2005 (age 21) Nauen, Germany

Sport
- Sport: Athletics
- Event: Decathlon

Achievements and titles
- Personal bests: Decathlon: 8345 (2026); Heptathlon: 5908 (2026)
Medal record
Men's athletics
Representing Germany
European U20 Championships
Gold medal – first place	2023 Jerusalem	Decathlon
European U18 Championships
Gold medal – first place	2022 Jerusalem	Decathlon

Amadeus Gräber (born 3 February 2005) is a German multi-event athlete. He won the gold medal in decathlon at the 2022 European U18 Championships and 2023 European U20 Championships and won the heptathlon at the German Indoor Combined Championships in 2026.

== Biography ==
From Brandenburg, Gräber started in athletics in 2014 when he was nine years-old. He went on to train at the Nauen Multi-Event Center as a member of SV Leonardo-da-Vinci Nauen, coached by Manfred Hofmann.

Gräber won the gold medal in the decathlon at the 2022 European Athletics U18 Championships in Jerusalem, Israel. He had been laying third overall behind Roko Farkas after the first day, before winning the title with a championship record 7626 points.

As an 18 year-old, Gräber won the gold medal in the decathlon at the 2023 European Athletics U20 Championships in Jerusalem with a tally of 8,209 points, including eight legal personal bests scores in the individual events, including a championship best height of 5.10 metres in the pole vault. It was the highest score for an athlete in their first year competing in the U20 category and moved him to second on the all-time world U20 list behind Markus Rooth. He was later named the German Youth Athlete of the Year.

Gräber competed at the 2025 Hypo-Meeting in Götzis but suffered an injury which ruled him out for the rest of the year. In February 2026, he won the pentathlon at the German Indoor Combined Championships in Halle with 5908 points. In May, he recorded a win over illustrious compatriots Leo Neugebauer and Niklas Kaul at the Deichmeeting in Neuwied, his performances including a clearance of 5.20 metres in the pole vault. Gräber scored 8345 points to finish ninth overall at the Hypo-Meeting on 31 May 2026 and was named 'Rookie of the Year'. In August, he competed at the 2026 European Athletics Championships in Birmingham, England, placing eighth overall in decathlon.

== Personal life ==
In October 2023, Gräber began studying medicine at a private university in Potsdam.
