= 2016 IAAF World U20 Championships – Men's decathlon =

The men's decathlon event at the 2016 IAAF World U20 Championships was held at Zdzisław Krzyszkowiak Stadium on 19 and 20 July.

== Medalists ==
Gold	Niklas Kaul; Germany
Silver	Maksim Andraloits; Belarus
Bronze	Johannes Erm; Estonia

== Records ==
Standing records prior to the 2016 IAAF World U20 Championships in Athletics
World Junior Record	Jiří Sýkora (CZE)	8135	Eugene, United States	23 July 2014
Championship Record	Jiří Sýkora (CZE)	8135	Eugene, United States	23 July 2014
World Junior Leading	Jan Ruhrmann (GER)	7972	Marburg, Germany	22 May 2016

== Results ==
=== Final standings ===
The highest mark recorded in each event is highlighted in yellow

Rank	Athlete	Nationality	100m	LJ	SP	HJ	400m	110m H	DT	PV	JT	1500m	Points	Notes
1st place, gold medalist(s)	Niklas Kaul	Germany	11.52	6.79	14.80	2.10	49.69	14.72	41.80	4.80	71.59	4:21.70	8162	WU20R, CR
2nd place, silver medalist(s)	Maksim Andraloits	Belarus	10.97	7.20	15.00	2.04	49.33	13.95	48.62	4.60	48.79	4:43.65	8046	NU20R
3rd place, bronze medalist(s)	Johannes Erm	Estonia	11.06	7.42	13.44	1.92	48.17	14.66	43.61	4.50	54.19	4:28.96	7879	NU20R
4	Santiago Ford	Cuba	11.40	7.05	13.09	1.95	50.09	14.20	51.67	4.00	63.57	4:34.54	7819	
5	Toralv Opsal	Norway	11.30	7.11	13.73	1.98	49.17	14.66	43.08	4.70	50.23	4:21.61	7815	NU20R
6	Jan Ruhrmann	Germany	11.29	6.78	15.83	1.98	49.61	15.11	45.95	4.30	56.72	4:27.10	7795	
7	Rik Taam	Netherlands	10.81	6.78	15.22	1.92	48.96	14.02	39.42	4.00	53.06	4:27.51	7699	
8	Cale Wagner	United States	10.94	7.29	13.20	1.95	49.52	14.93	37.27	4.20	52.84	4:35.67	7510	
9	Tristan Freyr Jónsson	Iceland	10.91	6.89	12.56	1.95	49.06	14.19	41.41	4.30	51.51	4:55.32	7468	NU20R
10	Rody de Wolff	Netherlands	11.40	6.69	15.57	1.89	51.82	14.93	51.44	4.10	56.75	4:56.23	7468	PB
11	Hans-Christian Hausenberg	Estonia	10.98	7.16	13.94	1.86	50.80	14.46	41.58	4.60	55.96	5:31.70	7370	
12	Dimitri Montilla	Belgium	11.49	6.87	13.19	1.98	51.17	14.50	42.34	4.60	42.70	4:47.24	7292	PB
13	Ludovic Besson	France	11.22	6.83	15.95	1.83	51.06	14.76	44.03	4.20	51.42	5:06.62	7284	
14	Alessandro Van De Sande	Belgium	11.15	6.64	14.05	1.95	50.31	14.64	38.73	4.30	47.91	4:46.30	7279	
15	Patryk Baran	Poland	11.24	6.95	13.69	2.01	51.92	14.54	35.12	4.40	50.35	4:58.58	7225	
16	Clément Foucat	France	11.32	6.84	11.77	1.83	50.44	15.32	41.48	4.50	46.12	4:24.11	7187	
17	Tuomas Valle	Finland	11.36	6.75	14.41	1.86	52.12	14.51	48.18	4.00	57.23	5:27.56	7155	
18	Alec Diamond	Australia	11.35	6.67	14.97	1.89	55.06	15.08	51.16	3.80	52.72	4:57.21	7111	
19	Ondrej Kopecký	Czech Republic	11.39	6.59	13.61	1.89	51.26	14.76	36.30	4.70	43.72	4:51.14	7056	
20	Sebastian Ruthström	Sweden	11.72	6.59	13.05	1.92	52.27	15.09	41.25	4.30	48.54	4:56.05	6920	
21	Víctor Pastor	Spain	11.74	6.15	12.20	1.83	52.27	15.74	41.27	4.60	53.82	4:57.66	6767	
22	Nathaniel Mechler	Canada	11.11	7.01	12.31	1.98	DQ	14.47	36.10	4.50	48.66	4:23.81	6678	
	Rafael Nogueras	Cuba	11.05	7.24	12.99	1.86	49.66	14.13	NM	DNS	–	–		

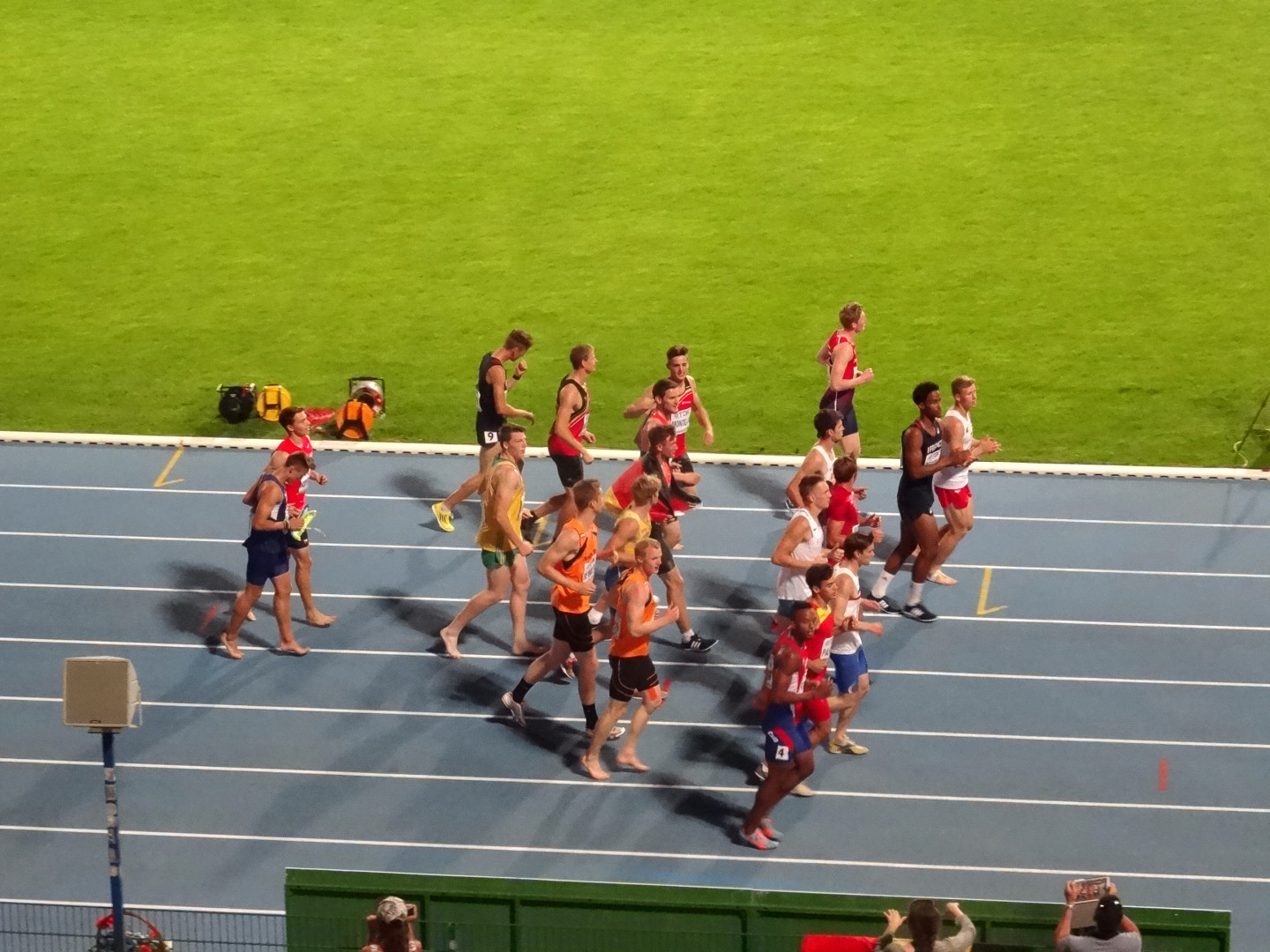
The athletes after the final event
