= Luuk Pelkmans =

Dutch athlete (born 2006)

Personal information
- Born: 11 October 2006 (age 19) Terheijden, North Brabant, Netherlands

Sport
- Sport: Athletics
- Event: Decathlon

Achievements and titles
- Personal bests: Decathlon: 8293 (Tampere, 2025); Heptathlon: 6127 (Champaign, 2026)
Medal record
Men's athletics
Representing Netherlands
European U20 Championships
Silver medal – second place	2025 Tampere	Decathlon

Luuk Pelkmans (born 11 October 2006) is a Dutch multi-event athlete. He was a silver medalist in the decathlon at the 2025 European Athletics U20 Championships.

== Early and personal life ==
He is from Terheijden, North Brabant. He is from a family of athletes; both his parents are runners and his brother Tim is also a multi-eventer. He began training in Breda from the age of six years-old. When he was 10 years-old, he held the European age-group best record for the high jump, with 1.57 meters. He joined the University of Illinois prior to the start of the 2026 indoor season.

== Career ==
In 2023, he won one gold medal, two silver medals, and a bronze medal at the Dutch National Under-18 Championships. He became the Dutch indoor champion in the heptathlon in February 2024, winning with five separate personal best scores. He was runner-up at the Dutch National Championships in the under-20 decathlon that summer, his 7490 points qualifying him for the 2024 World Athletics U20 Championships in Lima, Peru, in which he placed eleventh overall.

He won the heptathlon at the Dutch U20 Indoor Combined Events Championships in Apeldoorn in February 2025.

He was a silver medalist in the decathlon at the 2025 European Athletics U20 Championships in Tampere, Finland in August 2025. He scored a personal best 8293 points to finish runner-up to Polish athlete Hubert Troscianka who set a new under-20 world record in the event with 8514. The pair had a close battle with Pelkmans leading the event after the high jump, and regaining the lead again after the discus throw, with only 16 points between the top-two athletes as the event moved to its final three disciplines before the pole moved away prior to the 1500 metres, which Pelkmans won in 4:19.14.

At his debut heptathlon for the Fighting Illini in Champaign in January 2026, Pelkmans broke the school record with 6127 points. He placed fourth overall in the heptathlon at the 2026 NCAA Division I Indoor Track and Field Championships. In May, Pelkmans scored 8,004 points to win the decathlon at the Big Ten Championships. In August, he competed at the 2026 European Athletics Championships in Birmingham, England, in decathlon.
