= Makenson Gletty =

French athlete (born 1999)

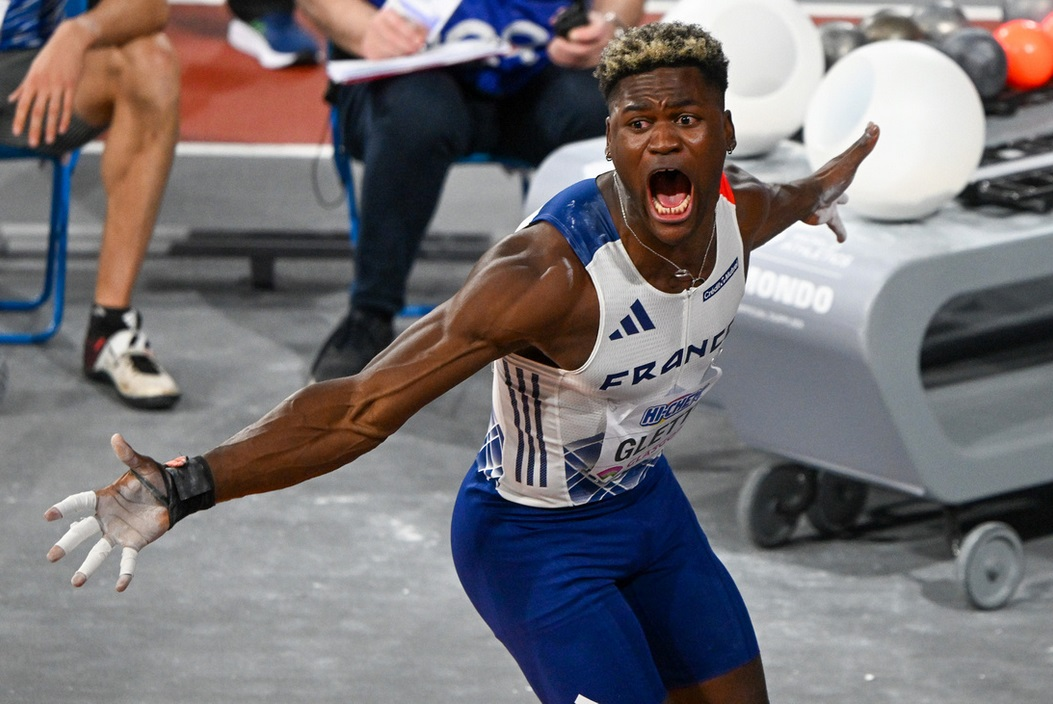
- Gletty at the 2024 World Athletics Indoor Championships

Personal information
- Nationality: French
- Born: 2 April 1999 (age 27) Mirebalais, Haiti
- Height: 192 cm (6 ft 4 in)
- Weight: 91 kg (201 lb)

Sport
- Sport: Athletics

Achievements and titles
- Personal bests: Decathlon: 8,606 (2024); Heptathlon: 6,230 (2024)
Medal record
Men's athletics
Representing France
European Championships
Bronze medal – third place	2024 Rome	Decathlon

Makenson Gletty (born 2 April 1999 in Mirebalais, Haiti) is a French track and field athlete. He is a national champion in the decathlon and indoor heptathlon. He was a bronze medalist in the decathlon at the 2024 European Athletics Championships.

== Biography ==
Gletty was crowned French heptathlon champion at the 2023 French Indoor Athletics Championships in Aubière in February 2023, scoring a tally of 6090 points. He competed at the 2023 European Indoor Athletics Championships in the indoor heptathlon in Istanbul, Turkey, in March 2023, and finished in ninth place overall with 5133 points.

Gletty won the French outdoor national championships decathlon title in Albi, in July 2023 with 8279 points. Competing at the Decastar meeting in Talence, Gletty set a new personal best of 8443 points to win the decathlon at the final World Athletics Combined Events Tour Gold event of the season on 24 September 2023.

Gletty was selected to compete in the heptathlon at the 2024 World Athletics Championships in Glasgow, Scotland in March 2024, and finished in fifth place overall with 6187 points. Competing in the decathlon he was a bronze medalist at the 2024 European Athletics Championships in Rome, Italy in June 2024, with a personal best tally of 8606 points.

Gletty competed in Paris at the 2024 Summer Olympics in the decathlon, finishing in twelfth place overall, having gained 8309 points.

Gletty placed ninth with 8146 points at the 2025 World Athletics Championships in Tokyo, Japan.

Gletty was selected for the 2026 World Athletics Indoor Championships in Poland in March 2026. In August, he competed at the 2026 European Athletics Championships in Birmingham, England, placing sixth overall in decathlon. In September 2026, he placed third with a tally of 8381 points at the Décastar in Talence. He finished the season placed fifth in the 2026 World Athletics Combined Events Tour rankings.

== Personal bests ==
Outdoor

Event	Performance	Location	Date	Points
Decathlon	—N/a	Rome	10–11 June 2024	8,606 points
100 metres	10.55 (+0.4 m/s)	Rome	10 June 2024	963 points
Long jump	7.59 m (24 ft 10 3/4 in) (-1.2 m/s)	Rome	10 June 2024	957 points
Shot put	16.46 m (54 ft 0 in)	Talence	23 September 2023	880 points
High jump	2.05 m (6 ft 8 1/2 in)	Montpellier	11 May 2019	850 points
400 metres	47.48	Saint-Denis	2 August 2024	934 points
110 metres hurdles	13.88 (+0.7 m/s)	Rome	11 June 2024	990 points
Discus throw	46.47 m (152 ft 5 1/2 in)	Grand Lyon	6 September 2020	797 points
Pole vault	5.07 m (16 ft 7 1/2 in)	Talence	24 September 2023	932 points
Javelin throw	62.89 m (206 ft 3 3/4 in)	Tokyo	21 September 2025	781 points
1500 metres	4:27.46	Talence	24 September 2023	761 points
Virtual Best Performance				8,845 points

Indoor

Event	Performance	Location	Date	Points
Heptathlon	—N/a	Aubière	27–28 January 2024	6,230 points
60 metres	6.89	Aubière	28 January 2023	922 points
Long jump	7.33 m (24 ft 1/2 in)	Aubière	27 January 2024	893 points
Shot put	16.95 m (55 ft 7 1/4 in)	Glasgow	2 March 2024	910 points
High jump	1.98 m (6 ft 5 3/4 in)	Lyon	3 February 2018	785 points
60 metres hurdles	7.79	Miramas	18 February 2024	1,035 points
Pole vault	5.01 m (16 ft 5 in)	Aubière	28 January 2024	913 points
1000 metres	2:37.57	Aubière	19 February 2023	901 points
Virtual Best Performance				6,359 points

== Personal life ==
A native of Haiti, he moved to France at the age of seven years-old. He completed a sports studies program in Montpellier. He trains in Nice, France, where he became a member of the French National Police in January 2023.
