= Athletics at the 2025 Summer World University Games – Men's decathlon =

Men's decathlon at the 2025 Summer World University Games
- Venue: Lohrheidestadion
- Location: Bochum, Germany
- Dates: 25-27 July
- Winning score: 7918 pts PB

Medalists
gold medal	Benjamin Guse	Australia
silver medal	Aleksi Savolainen	Finland
bronze medal	Nino Portmann	Switzerland

The men's decathlon event at the 2025 Summer World University Games was held in Bochum, Germany, at Lohrheidestadion on 25, 26 and 27 July.

== Records ==
Prior to the competition, the records were as follows:

Record	Athlete (nation)	Points	Location	Date
Games record	Roman Šebrle (CZE)	8380	Catania, Italy	30 August 1997
