= Nino Portmann =

Swiss athlete (born 2000)

Personal information
- Born: 20 February 2000 (age 26)

Sport
- Sport: Athletics
- Event: Decathlon

Achievements and titles
- Personal bests: Decathlon: 7982pts (2026); Heptathlon: 5630pts (2026)
Medal record
Men's athletics
Representing Switzerland
Summer World University Games
Bronze medal – third place	2025 Bochum	Decathlon
Jeux de la Francophonie
Silver medal – second place	2023 Kinshasa	Decathlon

Nino Portmann (born 20 February 2000) is a Swiss multi-event athlete. He won the bronze medal at the 2025 World University Games in decathlon.

== Biography ==
From Beckenried, he is a member of the athletics club LA Nidwalden. He won the silver medal in decathlon at the 2023 Jeux de la Francophonie.

In July 2025, Portmann won the bronze medal at the 2025 Summer World University Games in Bochum, Germany, in decathlon with an overall score of 7614 points.

Competing indoors in 2026, Portmann won silver medala in the heptathlon and the long jump at the Swiss Indoor Championships, winning his silver in the long jump by equalling his personal best of 7.43 metres.

Portmann set a personal best of 7930 points for decathlon at the Meeting Internazionale Multistars in Brescia, Italy, a World Athletics Continental Tour Bronze meeting, on 26 April 2026. In June, he set a personal best of 7982 points at the Swiss Combined Events Championships. In July, 7947 he scored points at the World Athletics Combined Events Tour Gold meeting in Nakło nad Notecią. In August, he represented Switzerland in decathlon at the 2026 European Athletics Championships in Birmingham, England, finishing fourteenth overall in decathlon.
