= Antoine Ferranti =

French decathlete (born 2003)

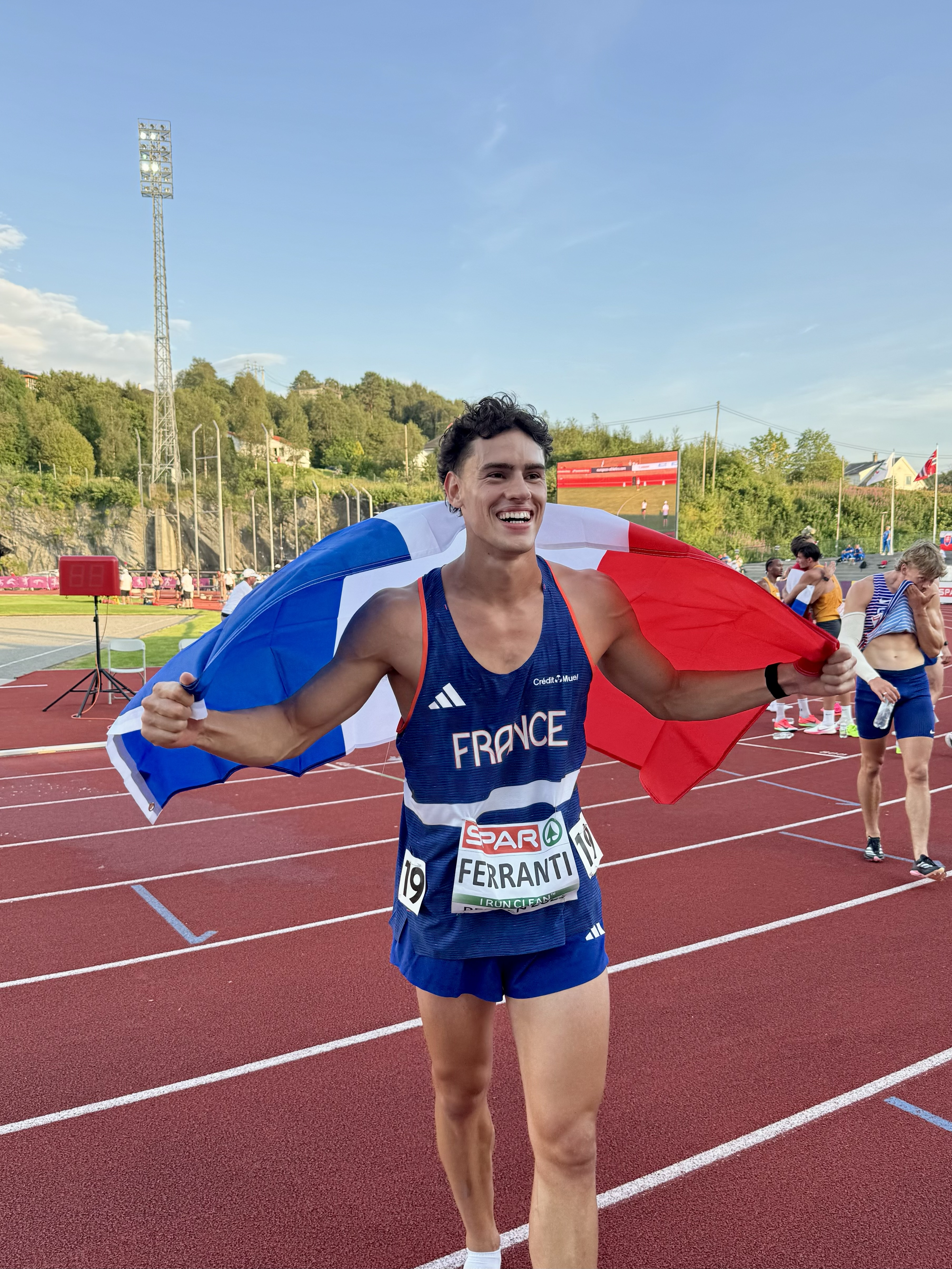
- Ferranti in 2025

Personal information
- Born: 9 January 2003 (age 23) Romans-sur-Isère, France
- Height: 193 cm (6 ft 4 in)
- Weight: 87 kg (192 lb)

Sport
- Country: France
- Sport: Athletics
- Event: Decathlon
- Club: l'Athletic Club des Pays d'Agde

Achievements and titles
- Personal best: Decathlon: 8221 (2025)
Medal record
Men's athletics
Representing France
European U23 Championships
Bronze medal – third place	2025 Bergen	Decathlon

Antoine Ferranti (born 9 January 2003 in Romans-sur-Isère) is a French decathlete.

== Biography ==
From Romans-sur-Isère, moved to Agde a few years ago with his family. He is a member of Athletic Club des Pays d'Agde, which is chaired by his father Jean-Paul and where he is coached by his mother Audrey. He was runner-up in the French junior championships in 2021 in the decathlon. He set a new personal best tally for the decathlon of 7757 points competing in Greece in May 2024.

He finished third at the Multistars decathlon in Italy in April 2025. He won the decathlon at the International Meeting of Arona, part of the World Athletics Combined Events Tour, in June 2025, scoring 8221 points overall to reach more than 8000 points for the first time. He was selected to represent France at the 2025 European Athletics U23 Championships in Bergen, Norway, and came back from eighth after the hurdles to win the bronze medal with 8032 points. He placed twelfth overall with 8003 points at the 2025 World Athletics Championships in Tokyo, Japan. He placed tenth overall in the season-long World Athletics Combined Events Tour for 2025.

In August 2026, he competed at the 2026 European Athletics Championships in Birmingham, England, placing tenth overall in decathlon.
