= Jip de Greef =

Dutch athlete (born 2004)

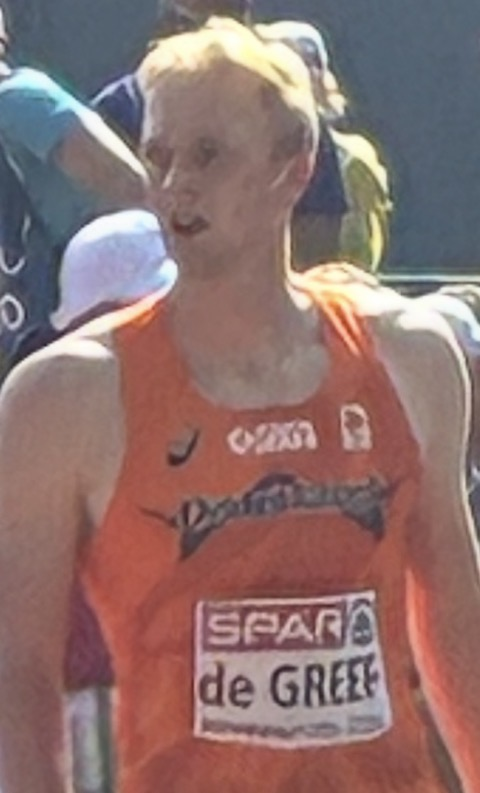
- De Greef at the 2026 European Championships

Personal information
- Born: 13 January 2004 (age 22)

Sport
- Sport: Athletics
- Event: Decathlon

Achievements and titles
- Personal bests: Decathlon: 8039 (Champaign, 2026); Heptathlon: 6120 (Fayetteville, 2026)

Jip de Greef (born 13 January 2004) is a Dutch multi-event athlete.

== Biography ==
From Amersfoort, de Greef placed second at the Dutch U20 Indoor Combined Events Championships in 2023, scoring 5159 points for the heptathlon, before winning the Dutch U20 title in decathlon that summer in June, with a tally of 7530 points in Assendelft.

De Greef studies in the United States, studying Recreation, Sport and Tourism Management at the University of Illinois. Competing for the Illinois Fighting Illini track and field he won the 2025 Fighting Illini Challenge and Combined Events indoor with the program's second-best score of 6,046 points for the heptathlon. He went on to compete in the heptathlon at the 2025 NCAA Indoor Championships in Virginia Beach but did not complete the competition.

The following year, he placed third overall in the heptathlon at the 2026 NCAA Indoor Championships with a new personal best of 6120 points. In April, he became the first Illini decathlete to achieve 8,000+ points in program history, with a tally of 8039 points in Champaign, and qualified for the 2026 NCAA Outdoor Championships. In August, having recovered from an injury that caused him to pull-out of the NCAA decathlon, he was selected to represent the Netherlands at the 2026 European Athletics Championships in Birmingham, England as a late replacement for Sven Roosen who himself suffered injury. He finished the competition in seventeenth place overall.

== Personal life ==
His brother Tim also competes in athletics and is a discus thrower.
