= Vilém Stráský =

Czech multi-event athlete (born 1999)

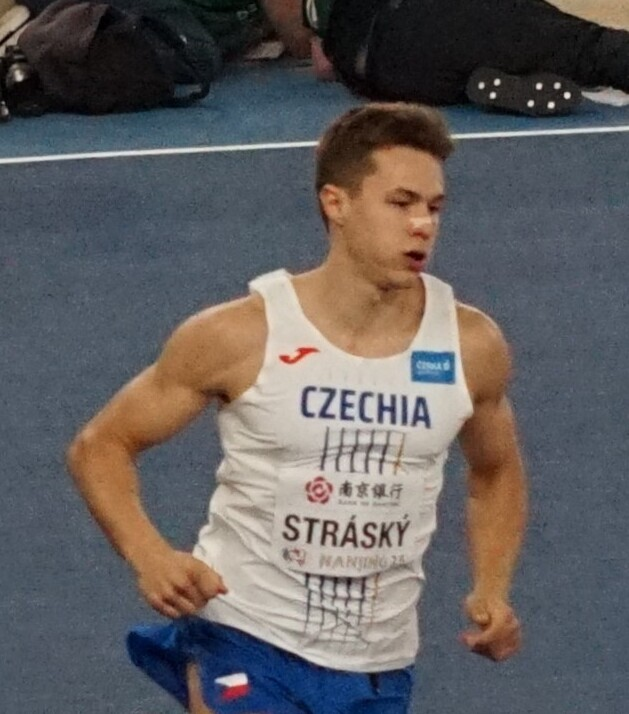
- Stráský in 2025

Personal information
- Born: 3 July 1999 (age 27)

Sport
- Sport: Athletics
- Event: Decathlon

Achievements and titles
- Personal bests: Decathlon: 8136 (2025); Heptathlon: 6162 (2025)
Medal record
Men's athletics
Representing Czech Republic
Summer World University Games
Gold medal – first place	2021 Chengdu	Decathlon

Vilém Stráský (born 3 July 1999) is a Czech multi-event athlete. He was a gold medalist in the decathlon at the FISU World University Games in 2021. He represented his country at the 2024 and 2025 World Athletics Indoor Championships.

== Biography ==
He is from Rozdrojovice and was initially a high jumper and a long jumper before focusing on decathlon. He previously trained in Brno where he attended the university and competed for VSK Univerzita Brno, before moving to Prague, where he is coached by Roman Šebrle. He won the gold medal in the decathlon at the delayed 2021 World University Games, held in Chengdu, China in August 2023.

He finished in sixth place overall at the 2024 World Athletics Indoor Championships in Glasgow, Scotland, setting a personal best tally of 6080 points in the nen's heptathlon. In May 202;, competing in Götzis, he broke the 8,000m mark for the decathlon for the first time. He finished in tenth place overall at the 2024 European Athletics Championships in the men's decathlon, reaching another personal best tally of 8088 points.

In January 2025, he won the Czech Indoor Combined Events Championships men's heptathlon title. He was selected for the 2025 European Athletics Indoor Championships in Appeldoorn, where he placed sixth overall with a personal best score of 6162 points. He was selected for the 2025 World Athletics Indoor Championships in Nanjing in March 2025, where he placed fifth overall.

He finished runner-up in the decathlon at the International Meeting of Arona, part of the World Athletics Combined Events Tour, in June 2025 in Spain, scoring 7972 points in total. He set a personal best in the decathlon of 8136 points finishing second at the Wiesław Czapiewski Memorial in Poland in July. He placed eleventh with 8110 points at the 2025 World Athletics Championships in Tokyo, Japan. He placed eighth overall in the season-long World Athletics Combined Events Tour for 2025.

In March 2026, he placed fourth overall in the heptathlon at the 2026 World Athletics Indoor Championships in Toruń, Poland. In August, he competed at the 2026 European Athletics Championships in Birmingham, England, placing thirteenth overall in decathlon.
