= Markus Rooth =

Norwegian athlete (born 2001)

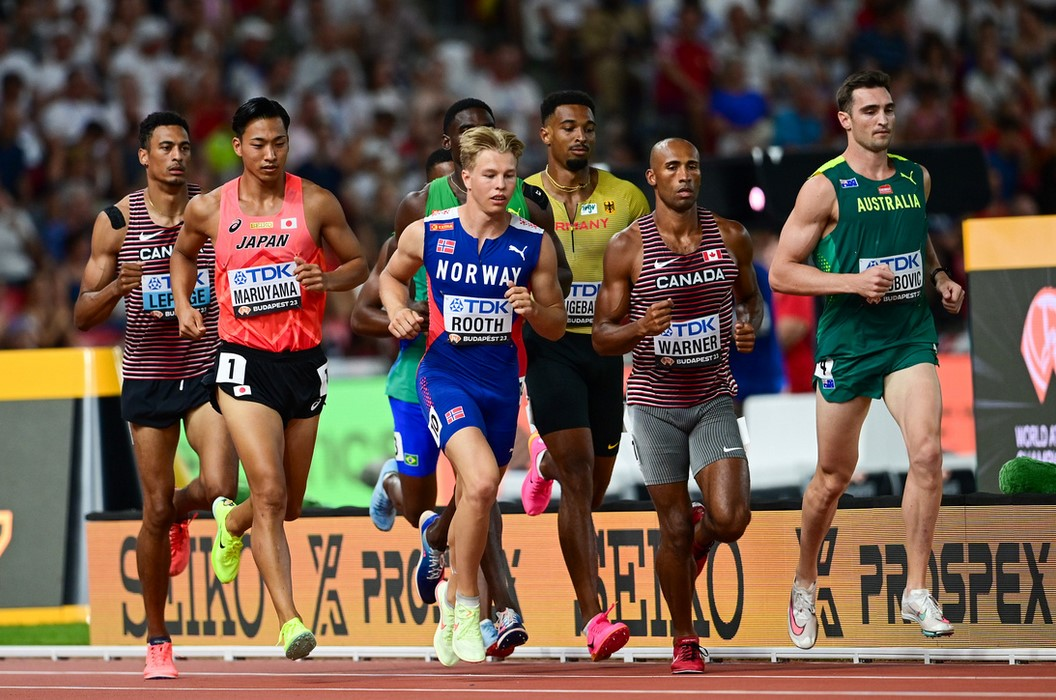
- Rooth in 2023

Personal information
- Born: 22 December 2001 (age 24) Oslo, Norway
- Height: 1.82 m (6 ft 0 in)

Sport
- Sport: Athletics

Achievements and titles
- Personal bests: Decathlon: 8,796 (Paris, 2024)
Medal record
Men's athletics
Representing Norway
Olympic Games
Gold medal – first place	2024 Paris	Decathlon
European U23 Championships
Gold medal – first place	2023 Espoo	Decathlon
Bronze medal – third place	2021 Tallinn	Decathlon

Markus Rooth (born 22 December 2001) is a Norwegian track and field athlete. He won the gold medal in decathlon at the 2024 Summer Olympics, the first gold medal for Norway in this event since 1920. He was also the 2023 European U23 champion.

== Biography ==
In 2020, competing in Bislett, Rooth finished on 8238 points in the decathlon, which places him second in the world U20 all-time standings behind only Niklas Kaul.

In 2022, Rooth set a Norwegian record in the decathlon with 8307 points in competition in Grosseto, Italy.

In 2023, Rooth had his Norwegian national record for the decathlon beaten by Sander Skotheim. However, with both men competing at the 2023 European Athletics U20 Championships, it was Rooth that triumphed with a new personal best, championship record, and national record score of 8608.

He competed in the heptathlon at the 2024 World Athletics Championships in Glasgow in March 2024. Competing in the decathlon at the 2024 European Athletics Championships in Rome in June 2024, he was contending for a medal before having to pull-out of the competition after sustaining an injury during the pole vault aspect of the event.

He won the gold medal in Paris at the 2024 Summer Olympics in the decathlon, finishing in first place overall with a national record tally of 8796 points. His compatriot Sander Skotheim who had entered no jump in the pole vault but stayed in the competition to pace Rooth around the 1500 metres course, was later awarded the World Athletics fair play award.

In January 2025, he was a winner at the 2025 Norwegian Sports Gala held in Trondheim, winning three awards in total, including the Norwegian Sportsman of the Year trophy as well as Breakthrough Sportsperson of the Year and the Name of the Year award, which was voted on by members of the public.

Rooth missed significant time after requiring surgery on an injury in 2025. In September 2026, he completed his first decathlon since the 2024 Olympic Games, placing ninth with 8209 points at the Décastar in Talence.

== Personal bests ==
Information from World Athletics profile unless otherwise noted.

Outdoor

As of 16 October 2025

Individual events
Event	Performance	Location	Date
800 metres	2:10.13	Sandnes	4 March 2018
110 metres hurdles	14.23 (+1.3 m/s)	Gothenburg	2 July 2023
Long jump	7.43 m (24 ft 4 1/2 in) (+1.8 m/s)	Askøy	30 July 2021
High jump	1.85 m (6 ft 3/4 in)	Bærum	14 June 2019
Pole vault	5.33 m (17 ft 5 3/4 in)	Athens	6 July 2025
Shot put	14.29 m (46 ft 10 1/2 in)	Stjørdal	26 June 2022
Discus throw	49.13 m (161 ft 2 1/4 in)	Oslo	21 April 2022
Javelin throw	66.12 m (216 ft 11 in)	Albufeira	14 May 2023

Combined events
Event	Performance	Location	Date	Points
Decathlon	—N/a	Paris	2–3 August 2024	8,796 points
100 metres	10.71 (+0.9 m/s)	Paris	2 August 2024	926 points
Long jump	8.01 m (26 ft 3 1/4 in) (−1.1 m/s)	Rome	10 June 2024	1,063 points
Shot put	15.31 m (50 ft 2 3/4 in)	Espoo	15 July 2023	809 points
High jump	2.03 m (6 ft 7 3/4 in)	Espoo	15 July 2023	831 points
400 metres	47.69	Paris	2 August 2024	924 points
110 metres hurdles	14.25 (+0.2 m/s)	Paris	3 August 2024	965 points
Discus throw	49.80 m (163 ft 4 1/2 in)	Paris	3 August 2024	866 points
Pole vault	5.30 m (17 ft 4 1/2 in)	Paris	3 August 2024	1,004 points
Javelin throw	66.87 m (219 ft 4 1/2 in)	Paris	3 August 2024	842 points
1500 metres	4:29.66	Espoo	16 July 2023	747 points
Virtual Best Performance				8,954 points

Combined events
Event	Performance	Location	Date	Score	Ref.
Triathlon multi-event	—N/a	Oslo	12 June 2025	2,799 points	
Long jump	7.67 m (25 ft 1 3/4 in)	Oslo	12 June 2025	977 points	
110 metres hurdles	14.07 (−0.8 m/s)	Oslo	12 June 2025	965 points	
Javelin throw	67.89 m (222 ft 8 3/4 in)	Oslo	12 June 2025	857 points	
Virtual Best Performance				2,799 points	—N/a

Indoor

As of 16 October 2025

Individual events
Event	Performance	Location	Date
60 metres	7.40	Steinkjer	10 March 2018
200 metres	22.73	Bærum	11 February 2018
800 metres	2:00.82	Sandnes	24 February 2019
Long jump	6.91 m (22 ft 8 in)	Ulsteinvik	3 March 2019
High jump	1.95 m (6 ft 4 3/4 in)	Bærum	9 February 2020
Pole vault	4.60 m (15 ft 1 in)	Bærum	21 December 2019

Combined events
Event	Performance	Location	Date	Score
Heptathlon	—N/a	Hvam	18–19 January 2020	5,798 points
60 metres	7.08	Glasgow	2 March 2024	854 points
Long jump	7.68 m (25 ft 2 1/4 in)	Glasgow	2 March 2024	980 points
Shot put	15.52 m (50 ft 11 in)	Glasgow	2 March 2024	822 points
High jump	1.98 m (6 ft 5 3/4 in)	Glasgow	2 March 2024	785 points
60 metres hurdles	8.01	Glasgow	3 March 2024	979 points
Pole vault	5.10 m (16 ft 8 3/4 in)	Glasgow	3 March 2024	941 points
1000 metres	2:48.24	Hvam	19 January 2020	956 points
Virtual Best Performance				6,145 points

== Personal life ==
He is related to the Rooth family of athletes from Oslo, with Andrea Rooth his cousin.
