= Jeff Tesselaar =

Dutch athlete

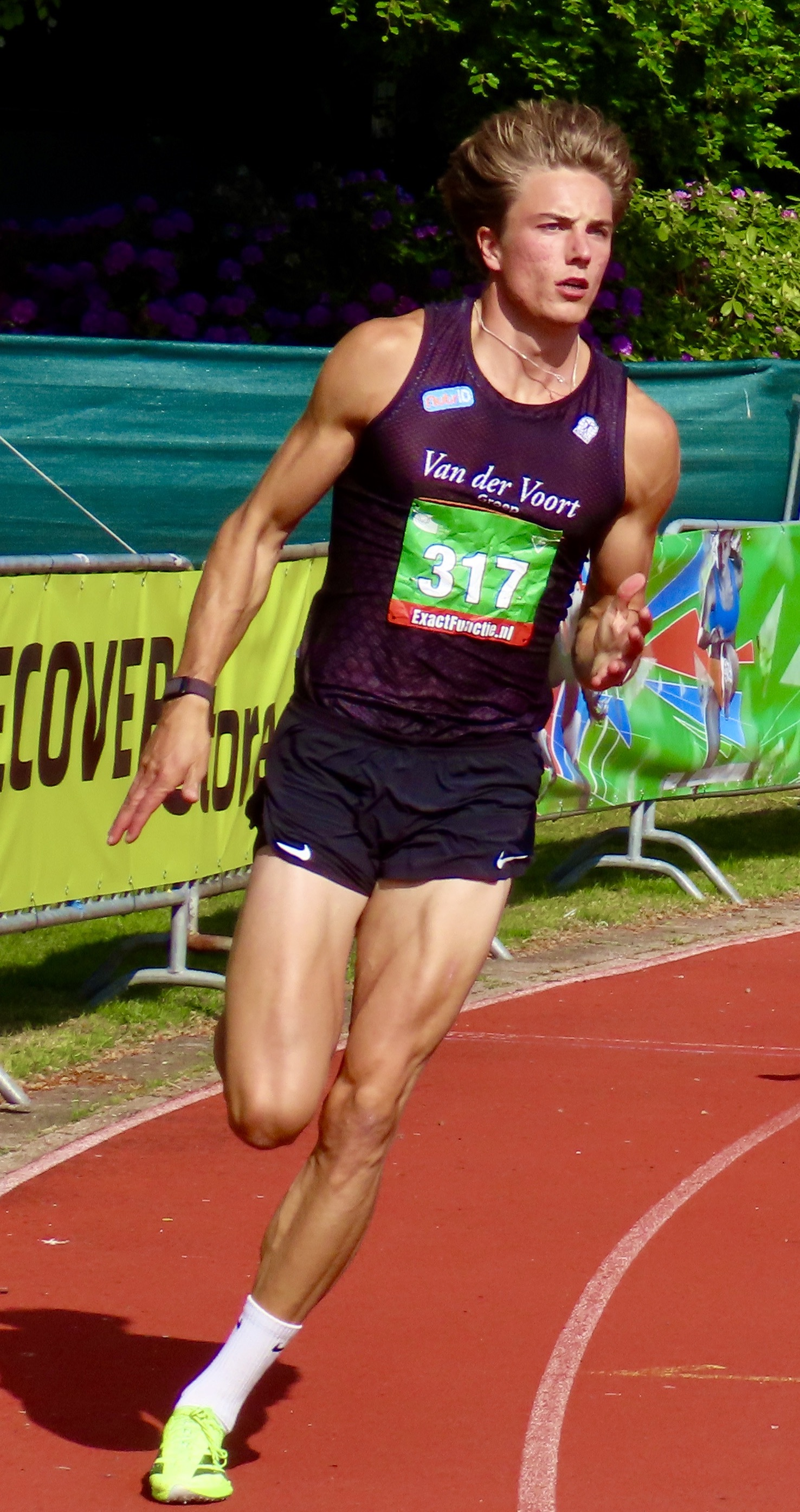
- Jeff Tesselaar in action at the 300 m during the 2026 Ter Specke Bokaal meeting in Lisse, Netherlands.

Personal information
- Born: 3 May 2003 (age 23)
- Height: 2.03 m (6 ft 8 in)

Sport
- Sport: Athletics
- Event: Decathlon

Achievements and titles
- Personal bests: Decathlon: 8378 (Birmingham, 2026); Heptathlon: 5948 (Apeldoorn, 2025)
Medal record
Men's athletics
Representing Netherlands
European U23 Championships
Silver medal – second place	2025 Bergen	Decathlon

Jeff Tesselaar (born 3 May 2003) is a Dutch multi-event athlete. He is a multiple-time Dutch national champion in the long jump. He competed in the decathlon at the 2024 European Athletics Championships and in the indoors heptathlon at the 2025 European Athletics Indoor Championships.

== Biography ==
He won his first Dutch Athletics Championships title in February 2024 in the long jump, with a jump of 7.63 metres at the Dutch Indoor Athletics Championships. That year, he also won the Dutch Athletics Championships outdoors title in the long jump.

He set a decathlon personal best of 8035 points competing in Tenerife, Spain at the Meeting Internacional Arona Pruebas Combinadas, in May 2024. He competed in the decathlon at the 2024 European Athletics Championships in Rome, Italy, making his senior major championship debut. He placed twelfth overall with a personal best tally of 8079 points, which included personal best marks in the discus and javelin, as well as a personal best 7.76 metres long jump, and a win in the 1500 metres with a time of 4:16.77. However, in the pole vault round he placed twentieth which set his overall position back significantly.

He won the long jump title at the 2025 Dutch Indoor Athletics Championships, with a jump of 7.43 metres in February 2025 in Apeldoorn. He was selected for the heptathlon at the 2025 European Athletics Indoor Championships, held in Apeldoorn, where he finished in eighth place with a new personal best of 5948 points.

He won the silver medal in the decathlon at the 2025 European Athletics U23 Championships in Bergen, Norway, in July 2025 with 8108 points.

Tesselaar jumped 7.44 metres to win the long jump title at the 2026 Dutch Indoor Athletics Championships in Apeldoorn. He was selected for the heptathlon at the 2026 World Athletics Indoor Championships in Poland in March 2026. During the competition he set a new personal best of 14.23 meters in the shot put. He also set a new personal best for the 1000 meters of 2:32.49 at the Championships, placing seventh overall. In August, he competed at the 2026 European Athletics Championships in Birmingham, England, placing fourth overall in decathlon. He finished the season placed seventh in the 2026 World Athletics Combined Events Tour rankings.

== Personal life ==
He is from Heerhugowaard in the province of North Holland. He is a member of AAC Amsterdam and studied Economics & Business Economics at the Vrije Universiteit Amsterdam. His younger brother, Zeb Tesselaar, also competes in athletics.
