= Andrin Huber =

Swiss decathlete (born 2004)

Personal information
- Born: 27 June 2004 (age 22)

Sport
- Sport: Athletics
- Event: Decathlon
Medal record
Men's athletics
Representing Switzerland
European U23 Championships
Gold medal – first place	2025 Bergen	Decathlon
European U20 Championships
Bronze medal – third place	2023 Jerusalem	Decathlon

Andrin Huber (born 27 June 2004) is a Swiss multi-event athlete. He won the decathlon at the Swiss Athletics Championships in 2024 and won the gold medal in the decathlon at the 2025 European Athletics U23 Championships.

== Biography ==
He was a bronze medalist in the decathlon at the 2023 European Athletics U20 Championships in Jerusalem, Israel, winning the decathlon 1500 metres in a time of 4:20.40 to finish with a total 8009 points.

He won the decathlon at the Swiss Athletics Championships in June 2024 with a tally of 7837 points. He set a new decathlon personal best tally of 8041 points in Talence in September 2024, his first time over 8000 points.

In February 2025, he won the heptathlon at the Swiss Indoor Combined Events Championships in Magglingen with 5802 points.

He won the gold medal in the decathlon at the 2025 European Athletics U23 Championships in Bergen, Norway, in July 2025. His performance included equalling his lifetime best of 4.80 metres in the pole vault and setting a new lifetime best of 60.50 metres in the javelin, winning gold with 8188 points.

In August 2026, he competed at the 2026 European Athletics Championships in Birmingham, England, placing ninth overall in decathlon.
