= Risto Lillemets =

Estonian multi-event athlete (born 1997)

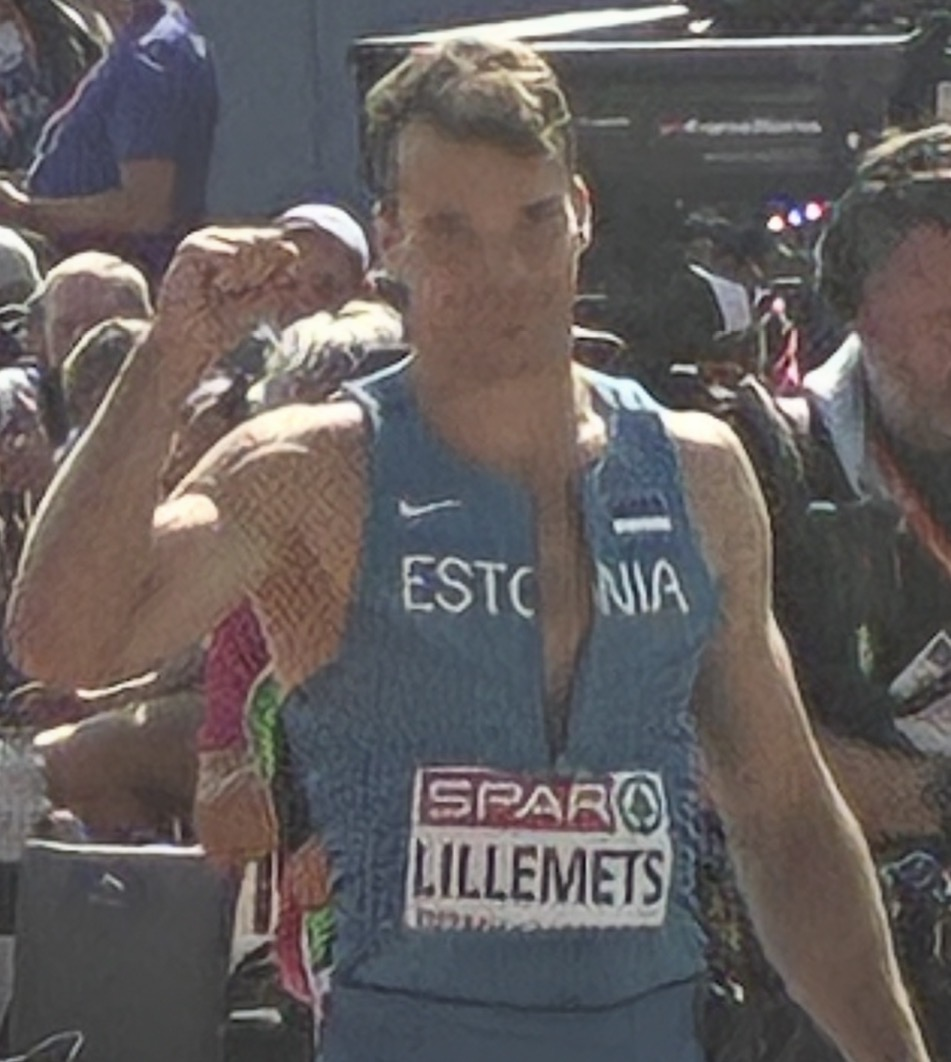
- Lillemets in 2026

Personal information
- Born: 20 November 1997 (age 28)

Sport
- Sport: Athletics
- Event: Decathlon

Achievements and titles
- Personal bests: Decathlon: 8156 (2021); Heptathlon: 6089 (2021)
Medal record
Men's athletics
Representing Estonia
European Indoor Championships
Bronze medal – third place	2023 Istanbul	Heptathlon

Risto Lillemets (born 20 November 1997) is an Estonian multi-event athlete. An Estonian national champion in the decathlon, he was a bronze medalist in the heptathlon at the 2023 European Athletics Indoor Championships.

== Early life ==
He is from Kuressaare on the island of Saaremaa. After high school he moved to Tallinn to attend Tallinn University of Technology, graduating with a degree in product development and robotics, and to train in athletics.

== Career ==
In August 2020, Lillemets became Estonian champion in the decathlon at the Estonian Athletics Championships having previously also won the heptathlon at the Estonian Indoor Athletics Championships in February 2020.

He won the pole vault at the 2021 Estonian Indoor Athletics Championships in February 2021. That year, he became the twelfth Estonian to eclipse the 6,000 point mark in the indoor heptathlon, and improved on his previous personal best result by almost 100 points to move to the seventh on the Estonian all-time list by scoring 6089 points in Tallinn to win the indoor heptathlon at the Indoor Estonian Combined Events Championships. In 2021, he finished fifth in the heptathlon at the 2021 European Athletics Indoor Championships in Toruń, Poland, with 6055 points.

He won the bronze medal in the Heptathlon at the 2023 European Athletics Indoor Championships in Istanbul, Turkey in March 2023 with 6079 points. In doing so, he became the fourth Estonian to reach the podium at the European Indoor Championships. He changed coach leaving Erki Nool in early 2024, having worked with him since 2022, to join Johannes Erm's large team, led by Holger Peel. In 2024, he was forced to withdraw from the decathlon at the 2024 European Athletics Championships in Rome, Italy.

He finished ninth in the heptathlon at the 2025 European Athletics Indoor Championships in Apeldoorn, Netherlands, with 5922 points which included a personal best in the 1000m of 2.37.83. Shortly following that, he finished eighth at the 2025 World Athletics Indoor Championships in Nanjing, China, with 5866 points. He placed third in the decathlon at the Wiesław Czapiewski Memorial in Nakło nad Notecią, Poland, a World Athletics Combined Events Tour Gold event in July 2025. He placed eleventh overall in the season-long World Athletics Combined Events Tour for 2025.

In August 2026, he competed at the 2026 European Athletics Championships in Birmingham, England, placing twelfth overall in decathlon.
