= Niklas Kaul =

German decathlete (born 1998)

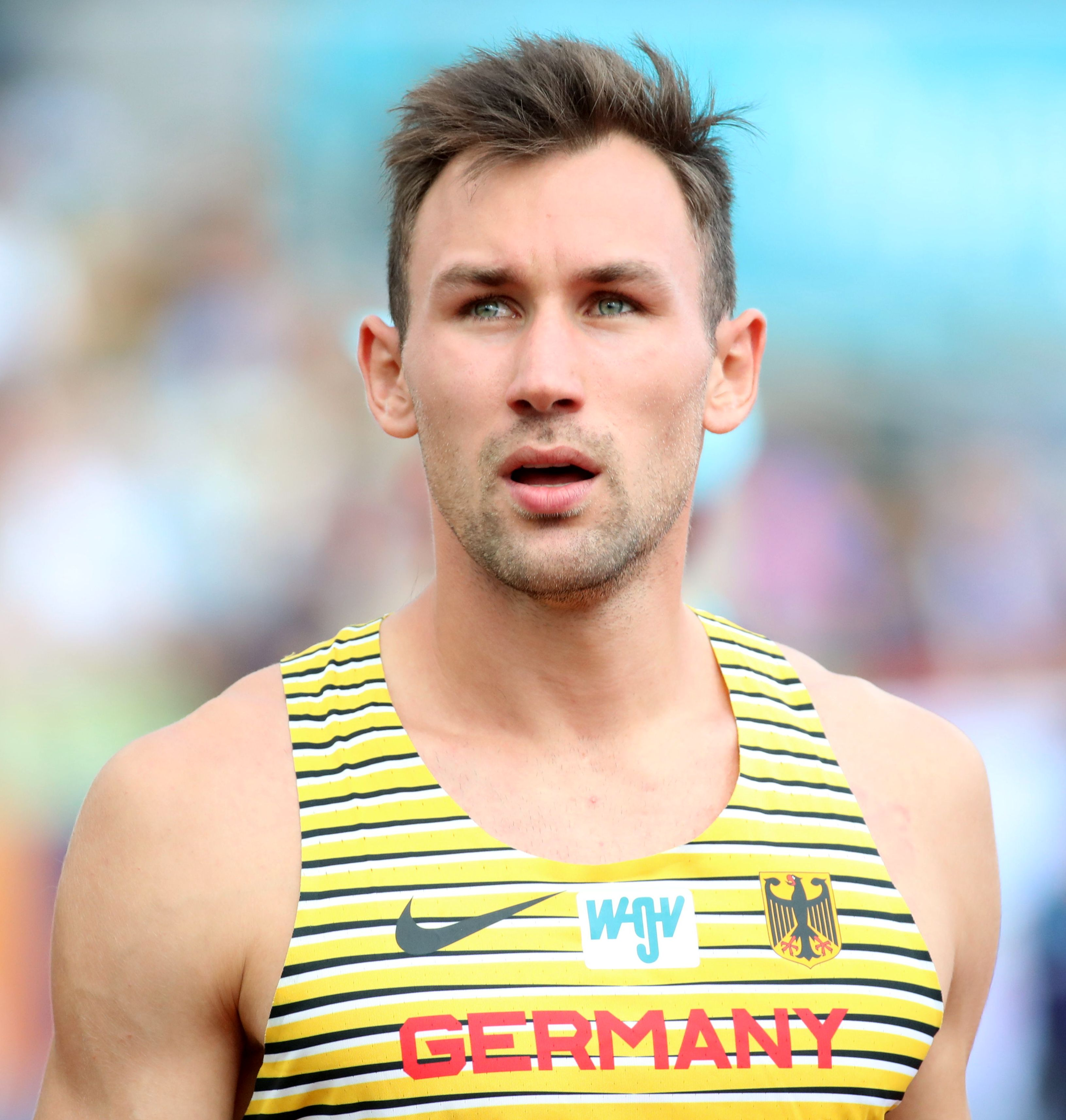
- Kaul at ECH 2022

Personal information
- Nationality: German
- Born: 11 February 1998 (age 28) Mainz, Germany
- Height: 1.90 m (6 ft 3 in)
- Weight: 90 kg (198 lb)

Sport
- Country: Germany
- Sport: Athletics
- Event: Decathlon
- Club: TuS Saulheim; USC Mainz
- Coached by: Francis Gross

Achievements and titles
- Personal best: Decathlon: 8,691 points (2019)
Medal record
Men's athletics
Representing Germany
World Championships
| Gold medal – first place | 2019 Doha | Decathlon |
European Championships
| Gold medal – first place | 2022 Munich | Decathlon |
| Silver medal – second place | 2026 Birmingham | Decathlon |

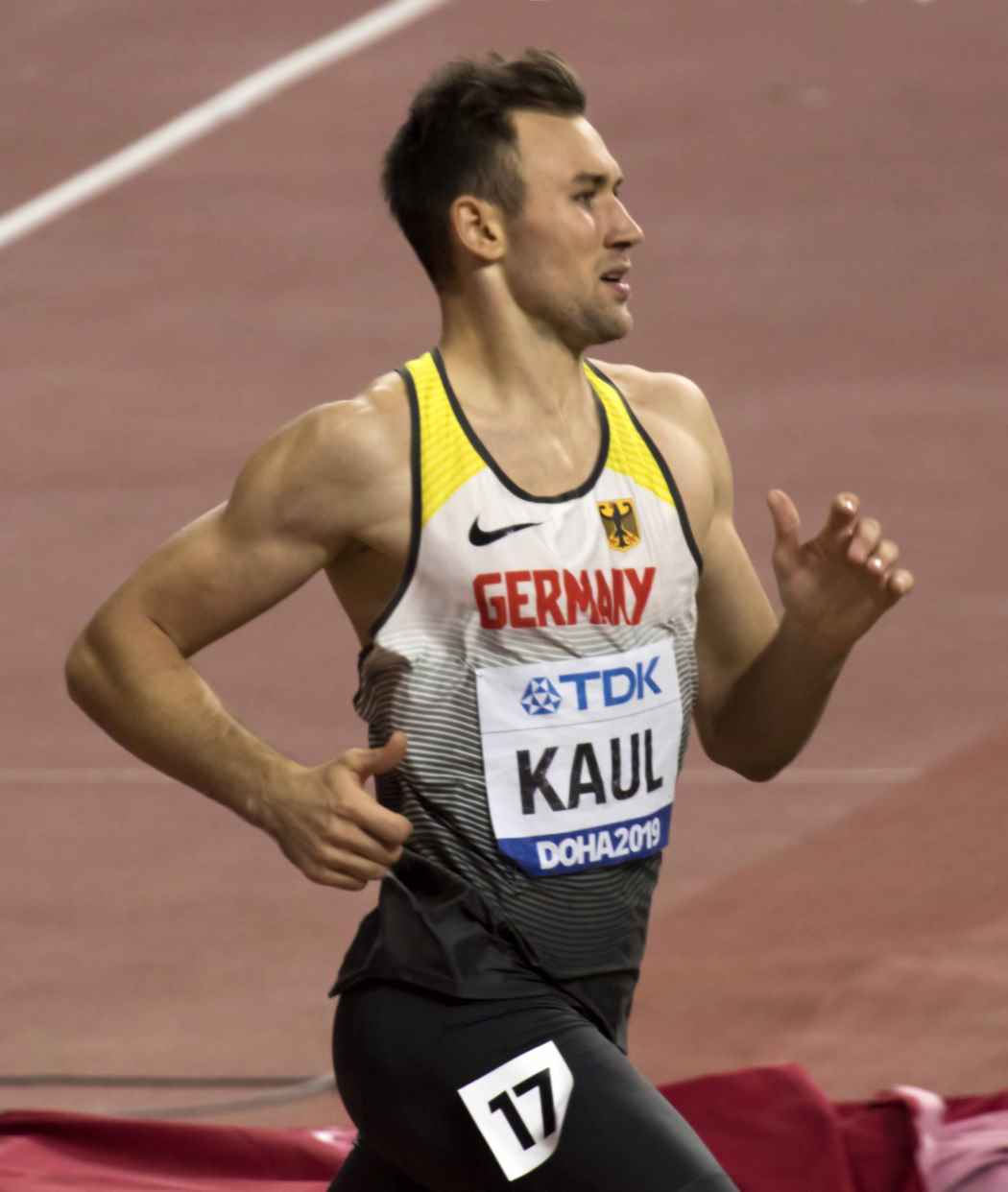
Kaul at the 2019 World Athletics Championships

Niklas Kaul (German pronunciation: [ˈnɪklas kaʊ̯l]; born 11 February 1998) is a German athlete competing in the combined events. He won the gold medal in the decathlon at the 2019 World Championships, becoming the youngest ever decathlon world champion. In addition, he won gold medals at the 2022 European Championships, 2016 World U20 Championships and 2017 European U20 Championships.

Before concentrating on athletics, he played handball.

== Personal bests ==
Information from World Athletics profile unless otherwise noted.

Outdoor

As of 18 August 2026

Individual events
| Event | Performance | Location | Date |
|---|---|---|---|
| 100 metres | 11.12 (+2.0 m/s) | Götzis | 31 May 2025 |
| 200 metres | 22.16 (+0.1 m/s) | Neuwied | 1 July 2022 |
| 300 metres | 34.94 | Neuwied | 17 May 2025 |
| 400 metres | 48.09 | Friedberg | 28 April 2018 |
| 1500 metres | 5:13.83 | Berlin | 1 September 2024 |
| 110 metres hurdles | 14.17 (+1.8 m/s) | Mannheim | 20 May 2024 |
| Long jump | 7.19 m (23 ft 7 in) (+0.3 m/s) | Frankfurt | 2 May 2021 |
| High jump | 2.05 m (6 ft 8 1/2 in) | Neuwied | 17 May 2025 |
| Pole vault | 4.91 m (16 ft 1 1/4 in) | Marburg | 13 August 2023 |
| Shot put | 15.26 m (50 ft 3/4 in) | Birmingham | 12 August 2026 |
| Discus throw | 47.24 m (154 ft 11 3/4 in) | Neuwied | 17 May 2025 |
| Javelin throw | 78.49 m (257 ft 6 in) | Berlin | 1 September 2019 |

Combined events
| Event | Performance | Location | Date | Score |
|---|---|---|---|---|
| Decathlon | —N/a | Doha | 3–4 October 2019 | 8,691 points |
| 100 metres | 11.12 (+2.0 m/s) | Götzis | 31 May 2025 | 834 points |
| Long jump | 7.44 m (24 ft 4 3/4 in) (+0.9 m/s) | Rome | 10 June 2024 | 920 points |
| Shot put | 15.26 m (50 ft 3/4 in) | Birmingham | 13 August 2026 | 806 points |
| High jump | 2.11 m (6 ft 11 in) | Tokyo | 4 August 2021 | 906 points |
| 400 metres | 47.87 | Munich | 15 August 2022 | 915 points |
| 110m hurdles | 14.27 (+0.4 m/s) | Eugene | 24 July 2022 | 940 points |
| Discus throw | 49.89 m (163 ft 8 in) | Rome | 11 June 2024 | 868 points |
| Pole vault | 5.00 m (16 ft 4 3/4 in) | Doha | 3 October 2019 | 910 points |
| Javelin throw | 79.05 m (259 ft 4 in) | Doha | 4 October 2019 | 1,028 points |
| 1500 metres | 4:10.04 | Munich | 16 August 2022 | 881 points |
| Virtual Best Performance | | | | 9,008 points |

Indoor

As of 18 August 2026

Individual events
| Event | Performance | Location | Date |
|---|---|---|---|
| 200 metres | 22.97 | Frankfurt | 28 January 2024 |
| 60 metres hurdles | 8.22 | Karlsruhe | 2 February 2025 |
| Shot put | 13.23 m (43 ft 4 3/4 in) | Ludwigshafen | 21 January 2018 |
| High jump | 1.90 m (6 ft 2 3/4 in) | Dortmund | 21 February 2016 |
| Pole vault | 5.00 m (16 ft 4 3/4 in) | Frankfurt | 3 February 2019 |

== International competitions ==
| Year | Competition | Venue | Position | Event | Notes |
Representing Germany
| 2015 | World Youth Championships | Cali, Colombia | 2nd | Javelin throw | 78.05 m |
| 2015 | World Youth Championships | Cali, Colombia | 1st | Decathlon (youth) | 8002 pts |
| 2016 | World U20 Championships | Bydgoszcz, Poland | 1st | Decathlon (junior) | 8162 pts |
| 2017 | European U20 Championships | Grosseto, Italy | 1st | Decathlon (junior) | 8435 pts |
| 2018 | European Championships | Berlin, Germany | 4th | Decathlon | 8220 pts |
| 2019 | European U23 Championships | Gävle, Sweden | 1st | Decathlon | 8572 pts |
| 2019 | World Championships | Doha, Qatar | 1st | Decathlon | 8691 pts |
| 2021 | Olympic Games | Tokyo, Japan | – | Decathlon | DNF |
| 2022 | World Championships | Eugene, United States | 6th | Decathlon | 8434 pts |
| 2022 | European Championships | Munich, Germany | 1st | Decathlon | 8545 pts |
| 2023 | World Championships | Budapest, Hungary | — | Decathlon | DNF |
| 2024 | European Championships | Rome, Italy | 4th | Decathlon | 8547 pts |
| 2024 | Olympic Games | Paris, France | 8th | Decathlon | 8445 pts |
| 2025 | World Championships | Tokyo, Japan | 4th | Decathlon | 8538 pts |
| 2026 | European Championships | Birmingham, UK | 2nd | Decathlon | 8573 pts |

Awards
| Preceded by Patrick Lange | German Sportsman of the Year; 2019 | Succeeded by Leon Draisaitl |
