= IDC =

IDC may refer to:

== Organizations ==
- Industrial Development Corporation, a South African state-owned development finance institution
- Independent Democratic Conference, members of the New York State Senate
- Information Dominance Corps, a group of U.S. Navy military information specialties
- Institute of Democracy and Cooperation, a think tank based in Paris
- Interactive Data Corporation, a financial services company
- InterDigital Communications, a telecommunications company
- Interdnestrcom, a mobile telephone broadband provider in Transnistria, Moldova
- International Data Corporation, a market research company
- International Detention Coalition, a non-government organization advocating for human rights
- Invensys Development Centre, a global common software development centre
- Castle Grande, also known as the Industrial Development Corporation, an Arkansas company involved in the Whitewater political controversy
- Islands District Council, the district council for the Islands District in Hong Kong

=== Schools ===
- Imperial Defence College, former name of the Royal College of Defence Studies, a British military academy (and post nominal letters used by graduates)
- Industrial Design Centre, part of IIT Bombay, India
- Institut de Cognitique, a school of engineering in France
- Institute of Design and Construction, a technical school in Brooklyn, NY, US
- Interdisciplinary Center Herzliya, the former name of Reichman University, Israel
- Paris Institute of Comparative Law, France

== Science and technology ==
=== Economics ===
- Indirect costs, costs of economic overhead (like administration)

=== Medical ===
- Dilated cardiomyopathy, a disease of the heart muscle
- Immature dendritic cells, a type of dendritic cell
- Indwelling catheter, a tube inserted into the urinary bladder for drainage
- Infiltrating ductal carcinoma or invasive ductal carcinoma, a type of breast cancer

=== Technology ===
- Insulation-displacement connector, a connector that pierces the insulation on a wire

==== Computing ====
- Ideographic Description Characters
- Internet data center, a facility run by a service provider to house computer systems and associated components for their customers
- Inter-domain controller, implements Inter-domain Controller protocol for dynamic networking across administrative domains

== Music ==
- IDC (musician), a British musician
- "I Don't Care" (Ed Sheeran and Justin Bieber song), also referred to as "IDC"
- "IDC", a 2015 song by Chastity Belt from their album Time to Go Home
- "IDC", a 2023 song by Collar

== Other uses ==
- Ideographic Description Characters, symbols for describing the composition of CJK characters
- Independent duty corpsman, a US Navy medical staff position; see United States Marine Air-Ground Task Force Reconnaissance
- Industrial Development Certificate, UK planning licence from the late 1940s to early 1980s
- Intangible drilling costs, an oil and gas industry term
- "I don't care", in Internet/chat slang
