= Galera =

Galera may refer to:

== Places ==
- Careiae, ancient city in Italy afterward called Galera
- Galera railway station, in Peru, the highest railway station in the Western Hemisphere
- Galera, Granada, a municipality in the province of Granada in Spain
- Puerto Galera, a municipality in the province of Oriental Mindoro in the Philippines
- Galera River, in Mato Grosso state in western Brazil
- Galera, Gaià, a singular population entity in the municipality of Gaià in Spain

== People ==
- Daniel Galera (born 1979), Brazilian writer, translator and editor
- Elia Galera (born 1973), Spanish actress and television presenter
- Federico Galera (born 1953), Spanish pentathlete
- Federico Galera Díez (born 1978), Spanish ski mountaineer and mountain runner
- Joaquín Galera (1940–2025), Spanish racing cyclist
- Manuel Galera (1943–1972), Spanish racing cyclist
- Philippe Galera (born 1967), Spanish footballer

== Other ==
- Galera (song), a 2011 single by Jessy Matador
- Galera, a synonym of Epipogium, an orchid genus
- Galera, a synonym of Galerina, a mushroom genus
- Galera cluster, a generic synchronous multi-master replication library for transactional databases, used in MySQL and MariaDB; see multi-master replication#MySQL / MariaDB
- Galera is the Spanish for galley, a type of sailing ship
