= Château de Francs =

Château in Bègles, France

Coordinates: 44°48′28″N 0°32′05″W

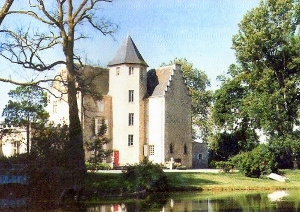
The Castle of Francs in Bègles

The Château de Francs is a château in Bègles, Gironde, Nouvelle-Aquitaine, France. The Chateau was first owned by La Maison De Nuchèze when Guilluame De Nuchèze IV, seigneur de baudiment, des Francs, de Brain, de Chincé & de Batrisse married Catherine des Francs. Catherine's parents were Louis des Francs, seigneur des francs & Bartholomée de Torve.

This is probably the same Guillaume de Nuchèze who called himself the Seigneur de Thorigné in a statement which he made on 6 July 1502 at Aimery de Rochechouart. On a more positive note it is known that he did serve in the armies of Charles VII and Louis XI. He married Catherine des Francs; it is said that she was possibly a granddaughter of the King or even daughter. Louis was married first to Margaret of Scotland and then Charlotte of Savoie so she doesn't fit in with any legitimate line.

He was still alive in 1486 so his date of death is unknown. Catherine brought considerable land and seigneuries with the marriage including that of Baudimont. In the de Nuchèze account written by Nicolas de Saint Marthe there is a genealogy tree which shows the family connection to the Royal House.

== Note on the 'des Francs' ==
In France in the Middle Ages, the term 'baron' refers to all members of the higher levels of the aristocracy, who held their title from the king. The barons from this era were amongst the oldest families of France. The baron held the historical rights to the place named in the title and the position signified by a title such as 'Baron de... or 'Seigneur de... This held true at least to the time of the Revolution. From the family tree it can be seen that the de Nuchèze acquired and held many titles many of which were acquired through marriage or in other ways. I do not propose to investigate them: it is obvious in some cases. But it seems that members of the family held quite a number of titles so would be powerful and rich landowners. In France as in many countries the feudal system was in place.

From the time of Napoléon, titles were passed on by hereditary principles without feudal considerations. I couldn't find any direct information on the title 'des Francs' but I believe it relates directly to the French King, who at the time was Charles VIII (1470–1498) succeeding his father Louis XI (1423–1483).

== Children ==
=== Charlotte m. François Thibault de La Carte ===
Seigneur de La Carte was born on the 14th of June, 1510.

=== Pierre de Nuchèze, Seigneur de Baudiment ===
d. 1532 m. Charlotte de BRISAY, Dame de Beaumont and great-granddaughter of King Louis X1 on 17.02.1505 at Poitiers

Pierre served in the Conquest of Italy-Kingdom of Naples-in the army of Louis X11; he was wounded and taken prisoner. In 1515 he fought in the 'Poitou' area; he was created a knight by François 1 as reward for his services. He and his wife are to be found interred in the chapel at Baudimont.

=== René de Nucheze, Seigneur de Baptresse ===
d. 1537 m. Françoise de Greuille

=== Jacques de Nuchèze ===
d. 1569 m. Françoise d'Anlezy

m.Catherine de Viry on 02.08.1579 (Antoine du Plessis)

=== Jean de Nuchèze ===
d. 1562

Jean was a 'Chevalier de Saint-Jean de Jérusalem' in 1523 and in 1562 was the Chief Prior of Aquitaine. The Knights of Saint John were in effect the French 'Crusaders'.

=== Françoise de Nuchèze ===
d. 1505

=== Louise de Nuchèze ===
m. Thibault de Brenezay
