= University of Bordeaux 1 =

Coordinates: 44°48′25″N 0°36′0″W

University of Bordeaux 1 Science and Technology
- Université Bordeaux-I; Sciences Technologies
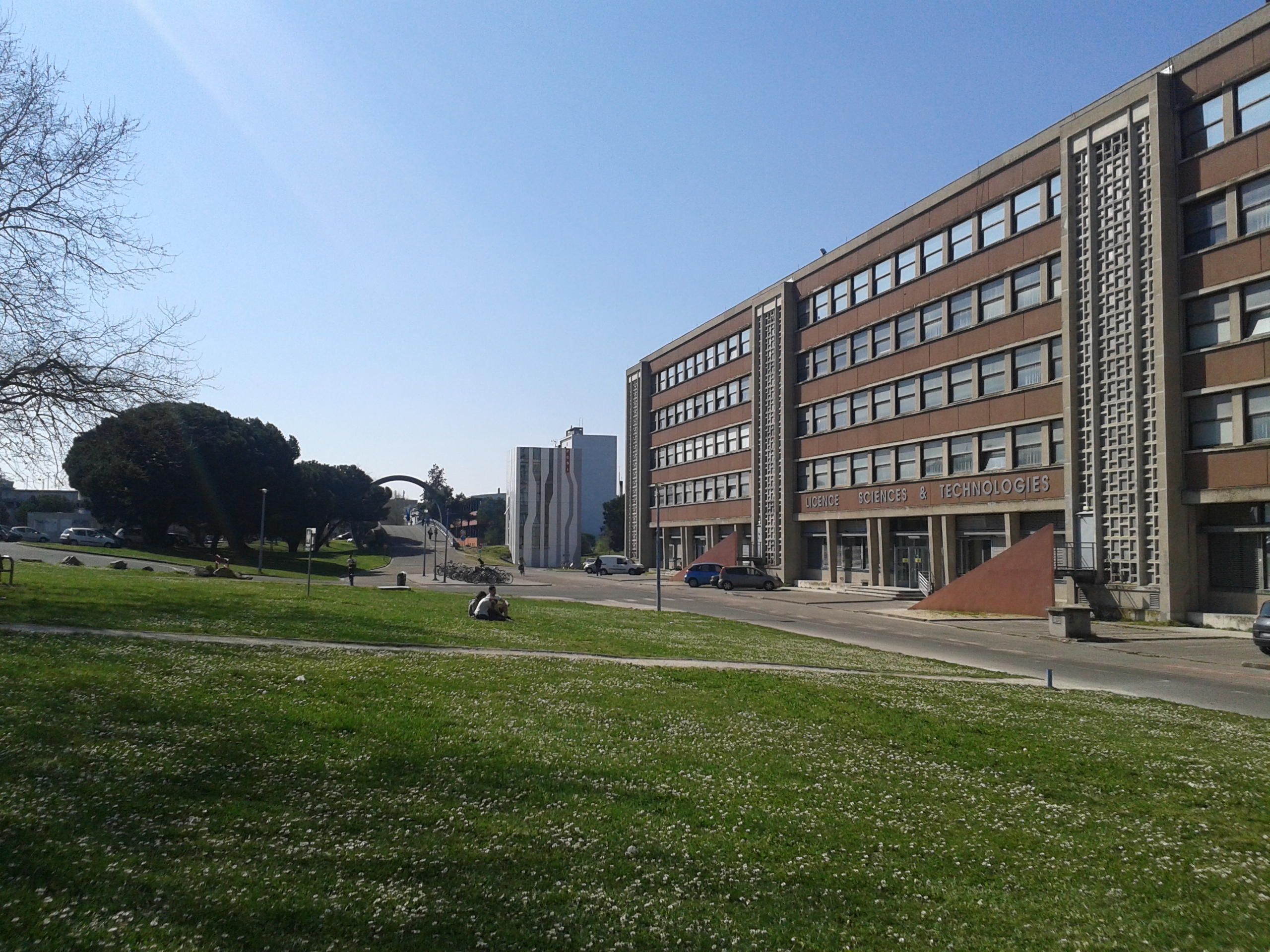
- Licence department
- Type: Public
- Active: 1970–2014 (merged)
- President: Dean Lewis
- Location: Bordeaux, France
- Website: http://www.u-bordeaux1.fr/

The University of Bordeaux 1 (French: Université Bordeaux-I) was one of the four universities in the Academy of Bordeaux, together with the Bordeaux Segalen University (Bordeaux 2), Michel de Montaigne University (Bordeaux 3) and Montesquieu University (Bordeaux 4). On 1 January 2014, it merged with Bordeaux 2 and Bordeaux 4 to form the University of Bordeaux. It currently operates as the Talence campus of the merged University of Bordeaux.

It houses many important laboratories, such as:

- Centre de Neurosciences Intégratives et Cognitives (CNIC), a neuroscience research center
- Laboratoire Bordelais de Recherche en Informatique (LaBRI), a computer science research center

== See also ==
- University of Bordeaux
- List of public universities in France by academy
