= Fadila Bouamr =

French-American virologist

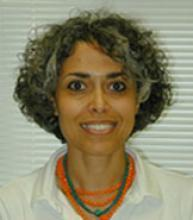
- Education: Bordeaux Segalen University
- Scientific career
- Fields: Virology, HIV research
- Workplaces: National Institute of Allergy and Infectious Diseases
- Thesis: Caractérisation de domaines du précurseur Gag impliqués dans la morphogénèse de la particule virale de HTLV-1 (1997)

Fadila Bouamr is a French-American virologist researching the molecular mechanisms that govern the assembly and egress of an infectious HIV-1 and the proteins involved in these processes. She is chief of the viral budding unit at the National Institute of Allergy and Infectious Diseases.

== Education ==
Fadila Bouamr earned a Ph.D. from Bordeaux Segalen University in 1997. Her dissertation was titled Caractérisation de domaines du précurseur Gag impliqués dans la morphogénèse de la particule virale de HTLV-1. Robert Mamoun was her doctoral advisor. Bouamr performed postdoctoral research with Carol Carter at the Stony Brook University and with Steve Goff at Columbia University.

== Career and research ==
Bouamr joined the laboratory of molecular microbiology at the National Institute of Allergy and Infectious Diseases in December 2004. She is chief of the viral budding unit. Bouamr studies the molecular mechanisms that govern the assembly and egress of an infectious HIV-1 and the proteins involved in these processes. Her unit researches the recruitment and function of cellular factors that facilitate virus separation from cells. She conducts structure-function studies of proteins and screens for new host factors involved in virus release. Bouamr studies the role of ubiquitin in virus egress and membrane scission and other cellular processes important for various steps of virus life cycle. She also studies virus assembly and trafficking to sites of virus budding.

== Selected works ==
- VerPlank, L.; Bouamr, F.; LaGrassa, T. J.; Agresta, B.; Kikonyogo, A.; Leis, J.; Carter, C. A. (2001). "Tsg101, a homologue of ubiquitin-conjugating (E2) enzymes, binds the L domain in HIV type 1 Pr55Gag". Proceedings of the National Academy of Sciences. 98 (14): 7724–7729. Bibcode:2001PNAS...98.7724V. doi:10.1073/pnas.131059198. ISSN 0027-8424. PMC 35409. PMID 11427703.
- Kikonyogo, A.; Bouamr, F.; Vana, M. L.; Xiang, Y.; Aiyar, A.; Carter, C.; Leis, J. (2001). "Proteins related to the Nedd4 family of ubiquitin protein ligases interact with the L domain of Rous sarcoma virus and are required for gag budding from cells". Proceedings of the National Academy of Sciences. 98 (20): 11199–11204. Bibcode:2001PNAS...9811199K. doi:10.1073/pnas.201268998. ISSN 0027-8424. PMC 58707. PMID 11562473.
- Bouamr, Fadila; Melillo, Jessica A.; Wang, Margaret Q.; Nagashima, Kunio; de Los Santos, Martha; Rein, Alan; Goff, Stephen P. (2003). "PPPYEPTAP Motif Is the Late Domain of Human T-Cell Leukemia Virus Type 1 Gag and Mediates Its Functional Interaction with Cellular Proteins Nedd4 and Tsg101". Journal of Virology. 77 (22): 11882–11895. doi:10.1128/JVI.77.22.11882-11895.2003. ISSN 0022-538X. PMC 253756. PMID 14581525.
- Dussupt, Vincent; Javid, Melodi P.; Abou-Jaoudé, Georges; Jadwin, Joshua A.; de La Cruz, Jason; Nagashima, Kunio; Bouamr, Fadila (2009). Malim, Michael H. (ed.). "The Nucleocapsid Region of HIV-1 Gag Cooperates with the PTAP and LYPXnL Late Domains to Recruit the Cellular Machinery Necessary for Viral Budding". PLOS Pathogens. 5 (3) e1000339. doi:10.1371/journal.ppat.1000339. ISSN 1553-7374. PMC 2651531. PMID 19282983.
