= The Sessions (band) =

Canadian dance-rock band

- Origin: Vancouver, British Columbia, Canada
- Genres: Indie rock, dance-punk, new wave, electro
- Years active: 2005–2008
- Past members: Josh Helgason (vocals, synthesizer, guitar); Tristan Norton (guitar, vocals); Martin Kottmeier (drums, vocals); Tobias Jesso Jr. (bass, vocals)

The Sessions were a Canadian dance-rock band from Vancouver, British Columbia. The band won the world's largest battle of the bands, Emergenza, in 2006.

== History ==
The Sessions formed in 2005. Members included bassist Tobias Jesso Jr., drummer Martin Kottmeier, guitarist Tristan Norton, and singer Josh Helgason.

In 2006, The Sessions joined the Emergenza band competition, along with 7,631 bands from 16 countries. The band won a competition in Calgary, and then moved on to the national competition in Montreal. The Sessions won first place at the Emergenza finals in Rothenburg, Germany.

The band recorded a six-song EP with producer Bob Rock, entitled The Sessions Is Listed as In a Relationship. The album received a mixture of reviews. Two songs from the album, "My Love" and "18 Candles", were featured in the mountain biking film Seasons by The Collective. The beginning of "18 Candles" is used as some of the Question and Answer music in Pawn Stars.

The Sessions toured the western United States in February 2008, hitting Popscene in San Francisco as well as dates in Las Vegas, Hollywood, and San Diego. Helgason left the band in March 2008 and co-formed Stars Blvd soon after. The band members did some session work in California, including recording with singer Melissa Cavatti.

== After break-up ==
Band members Tristan Norton and Martin Kottmeier have since co-formed electronic music DJ/production duo Young Bombs.

Tobias Jesso Jr. started a career as a singer-songwriter.

== Members ==
- Martin Robert Kottmeier - drums, vocals
- Joshua Helgason - vocals, synthesizer
- Tristan Norton - guitar, vocals, keyboards
- Tobias Jesso Jr. - bass, vocals
