= Thomas Lindemann =

Franco-German political scientist

- Born: Bonn, West Germany
- Education: University of Bonn, Sciences Po Paris, Sorbonne University
- Known for: Constructivism
- Scientific career
- Fields: International relations
- Workplaces: University of Versailles Saint-Quentin-en-Yvelines, Ecole Polytechnique
- Doctoral advisor: Jean Klein

Thomas Lindemann is a Franco-German Distinguished Professor of International Relations at the University of Versailles Saint-Quentin-en-Yvelines and the École polytechnique. Lindemann is best known for his development of the constructivist school of thought and more specifically, his research on the Theory of (mis)recognition as a central cause in the outbreak of international conflict and maintenance of international peace. In 2019, Lindemann was nominated to the National Council of Universities (Conseil national des universités - CNU) as a titular member of Section 04 in Political Science.

== Education ==
Upon his completion of a double bachelor's degree in Political Science and Philosophy at the University of Bonn in Germany, Thomas Lindemann was accepted to study at Sciences Po Paris, where he finished a master's degree in political science. Lindemann graduated from the Sorbonne University with a master's degree in International Relations and completed his doctorate's degree in political science, redacting his dissertation in French on "The Power of Perceptions and Perceptions of Power: "Völkisch", Ethno-Cultural Nationalism, and the July Crisis of 1914", under the supervision of Jean Klein.

== Career ==
Thomas Lindemann was appointed his first professorship in 1998 as Associate Professor (Maître de conférence) of Political Science at the Toulouse 1 Capitole University, France where he remained until his nomination as full Professor (Professeur des universités) of Political Science at Montesquieu University in Bordeaux, France in 2005. During this time, Lindemann was also appointed co-director of the master's degree in Global Security and Comparative Politics at the Montesquieu University. In 2008, Lindemann was nominated as Professor at the University of Artois in France. He is currently a Distinguished Professor of Political Science at the University of Versailles Saint-Quentin-en-Yvelines and the Ecole Polytechnique. From 2016 to 2017, he was an Alliance Columbia University visiting professor, where he presented his research on "Science, Technology, and the Logics of Preventive War". Lindemann currently teaches as an Adjunct Professor at Sciences Po Paris and is also the head of the Groupe d'Etudes et de Recherche sur les Conflictualités Internationales (GERCI), a research group studying the origins of war and the symbolic dimensions of armed violence.

== Recognition Theory ==
Inspired by Hegelian Philosophy and the works of Charles Taylor and Axel Honneth, Lindemann posits that identity-based recognition is a critical component of the maintenance of international security and positive peace. In his 2010 book on the Causes of War: The Struggle for Recognition, Lindemann demonstrated that the international system can be understood as a struggle for recognition between states. If acts of mis-recognition are at the crux of our understanding of the causes of conflict, then the necessary conditions for peace can be achieved through recognition. In this regard, he presented a lecture on "Iran: Internal Narratives and Real Security Challenges" at the Emirates Center for Strategic Studies and Research (ECSSR) in Abu Dhabi in 2013. Professeur Lindemann was interviewed by on TV78 - La chaîne des Yvelines for the 100th anniversary of the end of World War I on the punitive nature of the Treaty of Versailles.

== Selected publications ==
=== Books ===
- Causes of War: The Struggle for Recognition, ECPR Press, Colchester, 2010.
- Des Allemagnes et de l’Allemagne, FEDN, 1993.
- Die Macht der Perzeptionen und Perzeptionen von Mächten, Duncker und Humblot, 2000.
- La Guerre: Théories, Causes et Règlements, Armand Colin, Paris, 2010.
- Penser la Guerre. L’apport constructiviste, L’Harmattan, 2008.
- Sauver la face, sauver la paix. La lutte pour la reconnaissance internationale, Chaos International, 2009. (unpublished).
- Sauver la face, sauver la Paix: Sociologie Constructiviste des crises Internationales, L’Harmattan, Chaos International, 2010.

=== Collective Books ===
- C. Epstein, T. Lindemann and O.J. Sending, "Frustrated sovereigns: the agency that makes the world go around", Review of International Studies, vol. 44, no. 5, 2018, p. 787-804.
- T. Lindemann, J. Saada, et al., Guerre et reconnaissance, Paris, L’Harmattan, Culture et Conflits, no. 87, 2012/2013.
- T. Lindemann, C. Epstein and H. Guéguen, La reconnaissance : lectures hégéliennes, Presses de Sciences Po, 2016.
- T. Lindemann and M.L. Martin, Les militaires et le recours à la force armée. Faucons, Colombes?, L’Harmatan, 2006.
- T. Lindemann and E. Ringmar, The International Politics of Recognition, Paradigm Publishers, 2012.
- E. Cabanes, E. Husson, T. Lindemann, et al., Sociétés en guerre: 1911–1946, Armand Colin, 2003.
- S. Fine and T. Lindemann, La violence au nom de la loi, Presses de Sciences Po, 2026.

=== Articles ===
- "Identités démocratiques et choix stratégiques", Revue Française de Science Politique, vol. 54, septembre 2004/05, p. 829-848.
- "Les guerres américaines dans l’après guerre froide. Entre intérêt national et affirmation identitaire", Raisons politiques, février 2004, p. 37-57.
- "Peace Through Recognition. An Interactionist Interpretation of International Crises”, International Political Sociology, vol. 5, 2011, p. 68-86.
