= Bernard Claverie =

French psychologist and physiologist (b. 1955)

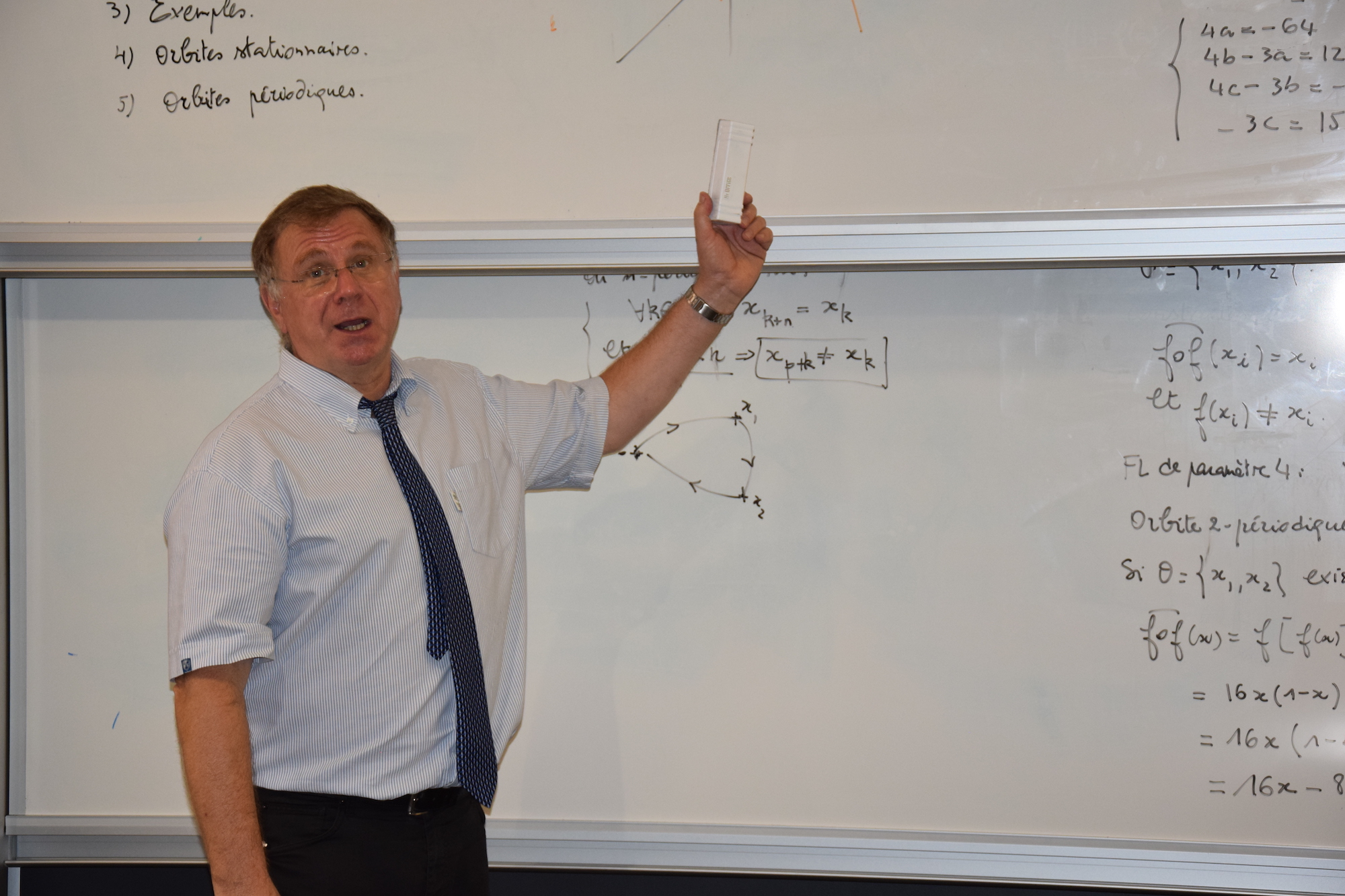

Bernard Claverie (born October 7, 1955) is a French cognitive scientist. He was full professor (Exceptional Class) at the Polytechnical Institute of Bordeaux and since September 2024 he is professor emeritus. In 2003 he founded the Institut de Cognitique and directed it for six years. In 2009 he founded the Ecole Nationale Supérieure de Cognitique ENSC, a French national engineering school and research center in applied cognitive sciences and cognitive technology.

== Early career ==
Bernard Claverie obtained his PhD in human neurosciences in 1983 at the University of Franche-Comté in Besançon (France) and received his Habilitation (HDR Accreditation to supervise researches) in 1987, as Doctor es sciences and as Doctor es letters and human and social sciences at the University of Bordeaux II. He graduated in Psychology with a license in General Psychology (1978) and a diploma in advanced studies in Psychological sciences and education (1980) from the University of Bordeaux II. He holds an International certification in Human ecology (1983) and a master's degree in clinical and pathological psychology oriented towards neuropsychology (2013).

He founded the "human psychophysiology and experimental neuropsychology" laboratory (EA-487 - 1990) at the University of Bordeaux II, which he directed until 2006. At the same time, he was the founder and the co-director of the university diploma of medicine specialization in neuropsychological sciences of the Faculty of Medicine, University of Bordeaux II (1989-2009). He was appointed university professor on September 1, 1992 (decree of February 1, 1993, p. 2050), and he attained the rank of exceptional class professor on 2011.

== Career ==
Bernard Claverie is a senior research scientist at IMS, a CNRS laboratory (UMR-5218) located at Bordeaux University. He is known for his work in cognitive psychophysiology during the first part of his career as a professor at the faculty of medicine of the University of Bordeaux II. During his tenure as director (founder in 2009 - director 2009–2019) of ENSC (a French Grande école dedicated to human and cognitive engineering), he became known for his work on explainable AI and on Human enhancement. With the directors of 5 other graduate schools of engineering, he co-founded the Polytechnic Institute of Bordeaux (2009) of which he was a member of the board of directors until 2019. Bernard Claverie was senior member and member of the scientific council of the Maison des Sciences de l’Homme d’Aquitaine from 2010 to 2020.

Bernard Claverie supervised some twenty doctoral thesis (PhD) in psychology, cognitive sciences, or neuroscience engineering. He is the author or co-author of more than 100 scientific papers (1980-today), chapters and books. He given more than 50 scientific and public guest lectures and conferences. He became a senior expert for cognitive sciences and interdisciplinary research for the French Ministry of Higher Education, Scientific Research and Innovation. He collaborates with industry groups in the aerospace industry. His current research focuses on augmented collaborative work and on the human dimension of AI enhancement in human-machine teaming.

As a private pilot (licence in 1973), he joined the citizen reserve of the French air force (OF5 in 2015), as such, he contributes to the work of the NATO Science and Technology Organization (Information systems technology panel). Since 2015 and his close collaboration with Denis Mercier, Supreme Commander of the NATO Allied Command Transformation, and his successor André Lanata, he has been working on the prevention of cognitive influence, which can be an invisible yet effective menace in cognitive warfare.

Since 2019, he has been a member of the Academic Council of the École de l'air et de l'espace.

Since 2017, Bernard Claverie has been the editor-in-chief of the open science journal "Ingénierie cognitique - Cognitive Engineering" (ISSN 2517-6978).

== Ideas and theoretical positions ==
Bernard Claverie advocates a “humanistic approach” to cognitive technologies. In particular, he sets artificial intelligence in an evolutionary perspective as an extra-corporal extension of human cognition, that is a mere enhancement instrument. He opposes the idea of possible future autonomy for machines. His work on intra-cerebral psychophysiology (clínical event-related potentials, deep-potentials in epilepsy) and on physiological psychology (Wada test in preoperative explorations of the brain) has convinced him that the idea of a simple connection between technology and thought, without the brain as a biological interface was inconsistent. Inspired by Nicholas Agar, he recently 2021 developed an inventory of ethical positions in augmentation technology, organized into sealed compartments ('individual health', 'progress for humanity', 'sustainable environment', 'post-liberal position for the future'). Each of these categories is then modulated by a continuum of positions, i.e. neo-ludism, regulation, “laissez-faire”, liberal, market-oriented approach, the defense of any of these positions leading to dogmatism, thorough misunderstandings and conflicts with those in favor of another one. Inspired by his own academic background, deeply influenced by (French-origin) structuralism and cybernetics, he promotes a scientific and reasonable constructivism for the future of humanity.

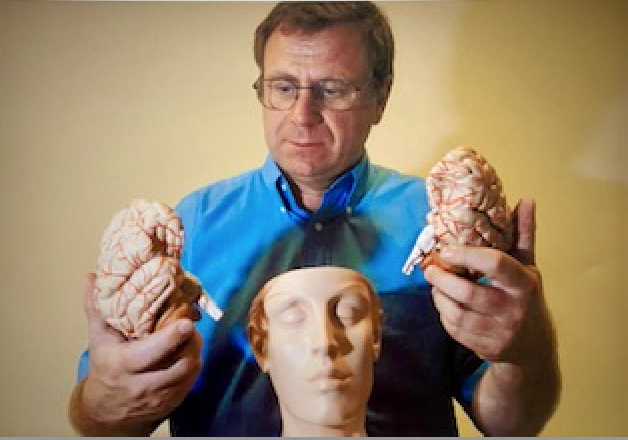
Bernard Claverie

== Distinctions ==
Bernard Claverie is Commander of the Ordre des Palmes académiques (French Order of Academic Palms) since 2022 (Knight in 2003, Officer in 2019).

In 2019, he reviewed the medal of honor of the Region Nouvelle Aquitaine. He has received several honors from the NATO Science and Technology Organization.

On October 7, 2021, he was elected as an associated member of the Académie nationale des sciences, belles-lettres et arts de Bordeaux (National Academy of Sciences, Art and Literature of Bordeaux).

On December 7, 2023, he was elected resident member in chair no. 5, left vacant by the death of Jacques Valade, whose eulogy he delivered at his formal reception held at the Hôtel de l'Academie, on December 5, 2024.

On November 5, 2025, he was elected as an academician in the college of free members of the Académie_nationale_de_chirurgie (National Academy of Surgery - France), with a public reception held on December 3, 2025, at the Academic Senate in Paris."

== Private life ==
Born in a modest family of small traders and craftsmen, Bernard Claverie was raised in a great musical tradition. His mother, Josette Herald (1933-2022), was first prize for violin in the music and declamation competition of the Leopold-Bellan Association (higher level, 1950, Paris), and his father, Robert Claverie (1928-1997) was first prize for trumpet (1949) then prize for excellence (1950) from the Bordeaux music conservatory. After extracurricular training at the Bordeaux Conservatory of Music, where he learned to play the cornet, BC practiced this instrument as an amateur musician (OST).

Bernard Claverie is married to Véronika, and has two adult daughters : Camille and Cécile. In his spare time, he lives in the Pyrenees mountains, in the Aspe Valley.

== Selected works ==
=== Books ===
- Douleurs : Du neurone à l'Homme souffrant. Claverie, Bernard, Le Bars, Daniel, Zavialoff, Nicolas, Dantzer, Robert. Paris: Editions Eshel. 1992. ISBN 2906704288. OCLC 133127983. pp. 184 (out of print).
- Douleurs : Sociétés, personnes et expressions. Claverie, Bernard, Le Bars, Daniel, Zavialoff, Nicolas, Dantzer, Robert. Paris: Editions Eshel. 1992. ISBN 2906704490. OCLC 613205391. pp. 232 (out of print).
- Cerveau et mémoires : Bergson, Ribot et la neuropsychologie. Jaffard, Robert, Claverie, Bernard. [S.l.]: Editions Osiris. 1998. ISBN 2905460350. OCLC 40647645.
- Management et cognition pilotage des organisations, questions de représentations. Claverie, Bernard, Sallaberry, Jean-Claude, Trinquecoste, Jean-François. impr. Corlet Numérique). Paris: L'Harmattan. 2009. ISBN 9782296110526. OCLC 690541390.
- Cognitique : science et pratique des relations à la machine à penser. Claverie, Bernard. Paris: L'Harmattan). 2005. ISBN 2747591352. OCLC 470331800.
- L'homme augmenté : néotechnologies pour un dépassement du corps et de la pensée. Claverie, B. Paris: L'Harmattan. 2010. ISBN 9782296133617. OCLC 697594167.
- Introduction aux sciences humaines et sociétales. Sallaberry, Jean-Claude, Claverie, Bernard. Paris: L'Harmattan. 2018. ISBN 9782343143576. OCLC 1037277338.
- Introduction à l'épistémologie et à la méthode de recherche. Claverie, Bernard. Paris: L'Harmattan. 2019. ISBN 9782343175676. OCLC 1122832501.
- Des théories pour la cognition. Claverie, Bernard. Paris: L'Harmattan. 2021. ISBN 9782343234526. OCLC 1259626088.
- Cognitive Warfare - La Guerre Cognitique (PDF). Claverie, Bernard, Prébot, Baptiste, Du Cluzel, François (Eds). Neuilly, France: NATO-Collaboration Support Office. 2021.
- Cognitive Warfare: The Future of Cognitive Dominance. B. Claverie, B. Prebot, N. Buchler and F. Du Cluzel (Eds). Neuilly-sur-Seine: NATO Collaboration Support Office). 2022. ISBN 9789283723929.
- Petit Abrégé de Grand Oral - Manuel pour les ingénieurs et scientifiques de haut niveau. Claverie, Bernard. Paris: L'Harmattan. 2026. ISBN 9782336612386.
