= Ed Tourriol =

French comic-book author

Edmond Tourriol
- Born: 1974 (age 51–52); Talence, France
- Occupation: Comic writer

Edmond Tourriol is a French comic-book author. He was born in Talence, Gironde, France in 1974.

He currently works in the MAKMA studio.

== Biography ==
Graduated in communication, Edmond Tourriol has dedicated himself to the world of comics of superheroes through Marvel and DC Comics.

During his studies in communication in Bordeaux, he developed the fanzine W.O.L.F, a magazine about heavy metal. This experience will help him learn how to lead a team and create a layout. Following the creation of this magazine, he founded Climax Comics studios with his former partner Olivier Dejeufosse.

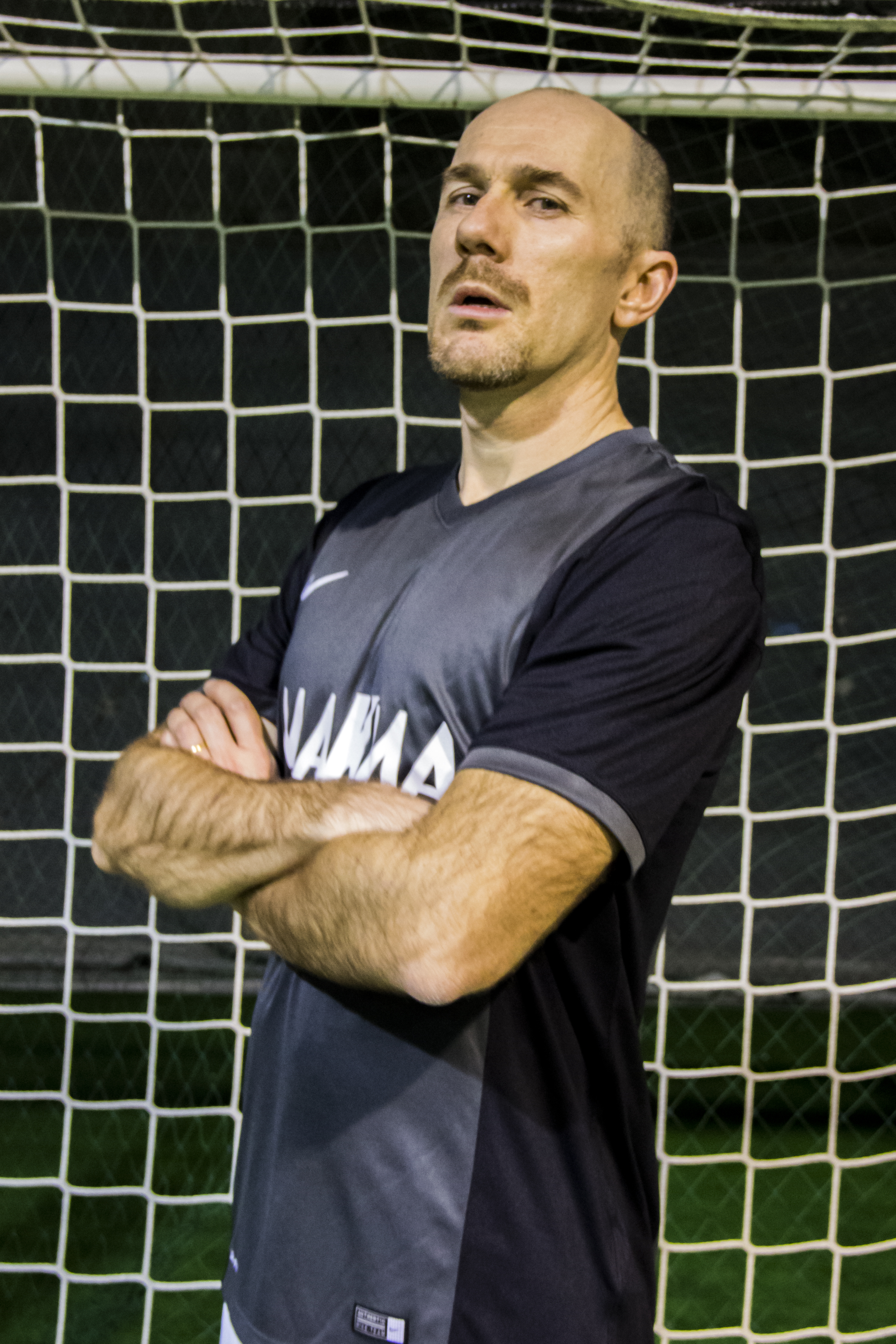
Edmond Tourriol at Angoulême festival 2015

He published with Climax Studios more than 50 fanzines and wrote some of his own comics Reflex and Zero Force. In 2001, he set up his advertising agency Clark System Innovation in partnership with Stephan Boschat. That same year he became a comic book translator for Semic Editions. For the French market he has translated many comic-books such as Superman, Batman, Teen Titans, Invincible, The Walking Dead, Beautiful Killer for Semic and Bamboo editions. In 2003, he founded Makma studios which gather more than 30 comic-book professionals (writers, artists, inkers, colorists, letterers...). They work in free-lance for various publishers in the U.S and in France. In 2004 he sets up SuperPouvoir.com with Nicolas Duverneuil which is now one of the main comic-book websites in France.

In addition to being a translator, he is a comic scriptwriter. Also, he has recently resumed his career as a writer. He writes Zeitnot, a manga penciled by Eckyo and published by Les Humanoïdes Associés. With Stephan Boschat, he is the co-writer of Mix-Man, a super-hero penciled by Sid for Milan Presse. Since 2007, he also writes the official Urban Rivals comic book, adapted from the on-line game, penciled by Samuel Ménétrier and inked by Fred Vigneau both working for MAKMA studio. In January 2011, the first issue of Urban Rivals is published by Kantik editions, it was penciled by Rocio Zucchi, who he had already worked with on Code Néon in Shogun magazine.

He also wrote the soccer-related humoristic comic book called Banc de Touche with Dan Fernandes. The two first volumes of this comic book (La bande à Raymond and Le Grand Fiasco) are inspired by the difficulties experiences by the French soccer team under the management of Raymond Domenech. The series was first published in the sport magazine L'Équipe.

Since 2013, he has been working with Dan Fernandes, Albert Carreres and Ben KG on the comic book Zlatan Style, which depicts the adventures of the soccer player Zlatan Ibrahimović in Ligue 1 in a humoristic way. To this list is also added Le Réveil des Bleus, Neymar Style and two manga: Paris Saint-Germain Infinity and L'Équipe Z.

== Creation ==
=== Scriptwriter ===
- Zeitnot, 2007, Shogun editions
- Banc de touche, from 2010 to 2011, Kantik editions
- Morsures, 2011, Kantik editions
- Zlatan Style since 2013, Hugo BD editions
- Le Réveil des Bleus, 2016, Hugo BD éditions
- Neymar Style, 2018, Hugo BD editions
- Paris Saint-Germain Infinity since 2016, Soleil editions
- L'Équipe Z since 2016, Kotoji editions

=== Translator ===
- Walking Dead since 2007, Delcourt editions
- Invincible since 2005, Delcourt editions
