= Character block =

The Unicode usage character block or characters block may refer to:

- Ideographic Description Characters
- Specials (Unicode block)
