= Villenave-d'Ornon =

Villenave d'Ornon
- Commune
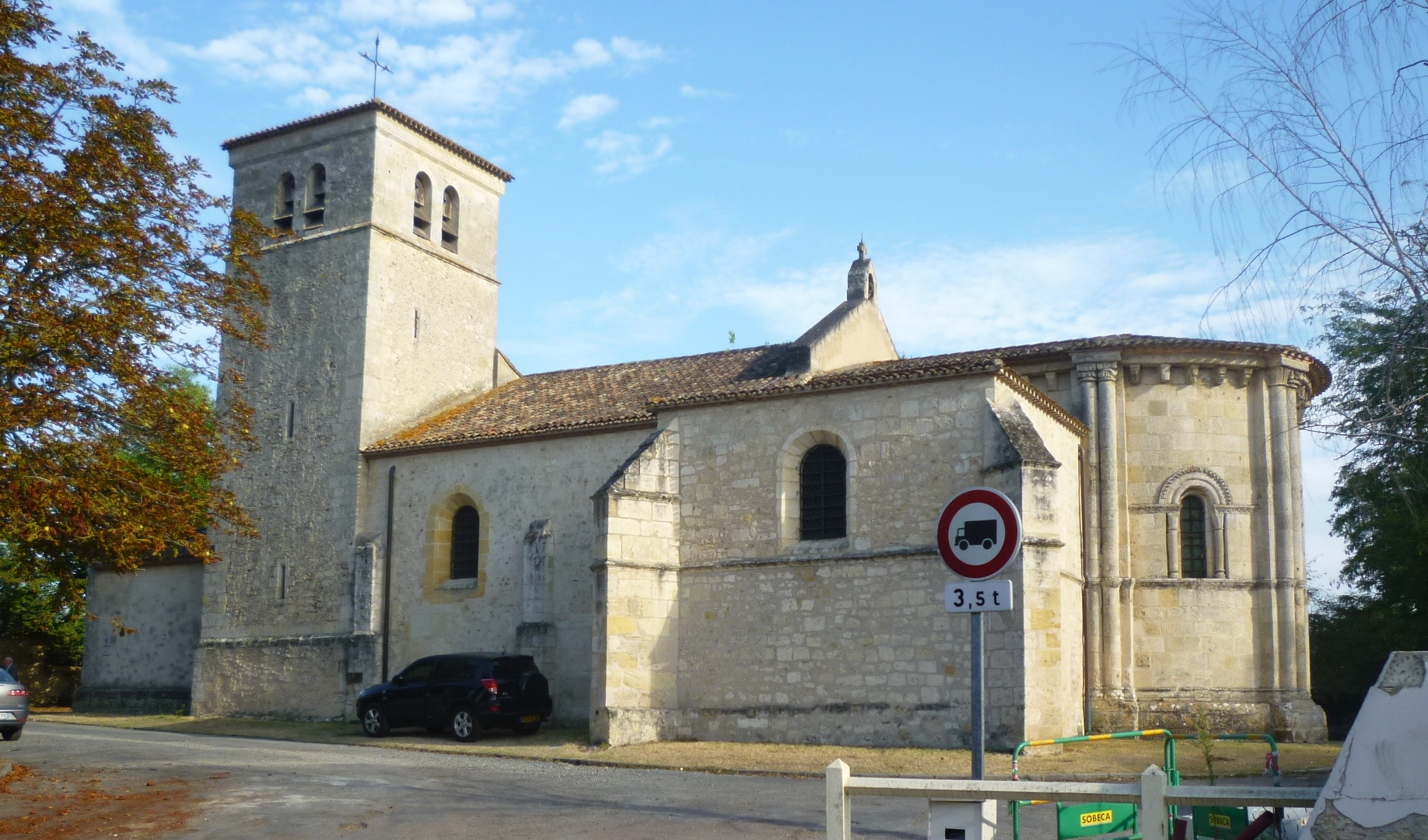
- The church in Villenave-d'Ornon

- Coat of arms
- Location of Villenave d'Ornon
- Location within France Location within Nouvelle-Aquitaine
- Coordinates: 44°46′50″N 0°33′57″W
- Country: France
- Region: Nouvelle-Aquitaine
- Department: Gironde
- Arrondissement: Bordeaux
- Canton: Villenave-d'Ornon
- Intercommunality: Bordeaux Métropole

Government
  - Mayor (2023–2026): Michel Poignonec
- Area^{1}: 21.26 km^{2} (8.21 sq mi)
- Highest elevation: 41 m (135 ft)
- Lowest elevation: 3 m (9.8 ft)
- Population (2023): 42,545
  - Density: 2,001/km^{2} (5,183/sq mi)
- Time zone: UTC+01:00 (CET)
  - Summer (DST): UTC+02:00 (CEST)
- INSEE/Postal code: 33550 /33140
- ^{1} French Land Register data, which excludes lakes, ponds, glaciers > 1 km^{2} (0.386 sq mi or 247 acres) and river estuaries.

Villenave d’Ornon (French pronunciation: [vilnav dɔʁnɔ̃]; Gascon: Vilanava d’Ornon) is a commune in the Gironde department in Nouvelle-Aquitaine in southwestern France.

It is the fourth-largest suburb of the city of Bordeaux, and is located to its south side. Thus, it is a member of the Bordeaux Métropole. Villenave-d'Ornon station has rail connections to Langon and Bordeaux.

== Geography ==
Bordering towns of Villenave d'Ornon on the left bank of the Garonne River include Bègles to the north, Cadaujac to the south, Léognan to the south-west, Gradignan to the west, and Talence to the north-west. About 500 meters away, across the right bank of the Garonne, Villenave d'Ornon is bordered by Latresne to the east and Camblanes-et-Maynac to the south-east.

== History ==
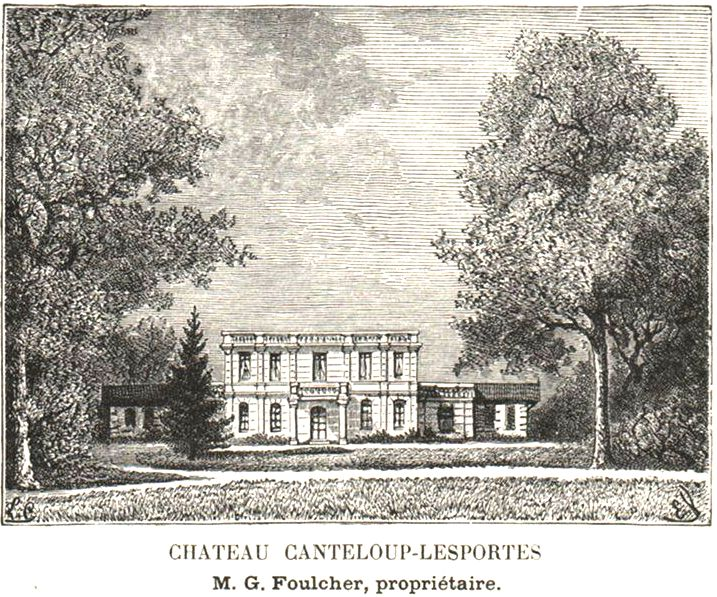
The former Château de Canteloup, now the Hôtel de Ville

The Hôtel de Ville is the former Château de Canteloup which was completed in 1777.

== Population ==
Historical population

Year	Pop.	±% p.a.
1793	1,400	—
1800	1,231	−1.82%
1806	1,295	+0.85%
1821	1,324	+0.15%
1831	1,377	+0.39%
1836	1,318	−0.87%
1841	1,535	+3.10%
1846	1,622	+1.11%
1851	1,779	+1.87%
1856	1,991	+2.28%
1861	2,161	+1.65%
1866	2,276	+1.04%
1872	2,200	−0.56%
1876	2,408	+2.28%
1881	2,733	+2.56%
1886	3,075	+2.39%
1891	3,143	+0.44%
1896	3,316	+1.08%
1901	3,335	+0.11%

Year	Pop.	±% p.a.
1906	3,635	+1.74%
1911	4,020	+2.03%
1921	4,507	+1.15%
1926	5,416	+3.74%
1931	6,215	+2.79%
1936	6,764	+1.71%
1946	8,766	+2.63%
1954	9,989	+1.65%
1962	13,401	+3.74%
1968	21,263	+8.00%
1975	22,975	+1.11%
1982	21,073	−1.23%
1990	25,609	+2.47%
1999	27,500	+0.79%
2007	29,339	+0.81%
2012	29,804	+0.31%
2017	34,090	+2.72%
2023	42,545	+3.76%

Source: EHESS and INSEE (1968-2023)

== Twin towns – sister cities ==
Villenave-d'Ornon is twinned with:

- Seeheim-Jugenheim, Germany (1982)
- Torres Vedras, Portugal (1992)
- Bridgend, Wales, United Kingdom (1994)

== See also ==
- Communes of the Gironde department
