= Institut de Cognitique =

Coordinates: 44.8060°N 0.5975°W

Institut de cognitique
- Type: Public
- Established: 2003
- Founders: Bernard Claverie
- Location: Bordeaux, France
- Campus: Bordeaux Segalen University
- Website: https://ensc.bordeaux-inp.fr/fr

In Bordeaux, the Cognitique Institute (IdC) was a public education institution, founded in 2003 by the Bordeaux Segalen University, that includes a cognitive engineering training program (master in engineering), two Masters programs and a PhD program in applied cognitive science. In 2009, IdC joined the Polytechnic Institute of Bordeaux (IPB) and its name changed to become : Ecole Nationale Superieure de Cognitique (ENSC). Professor Bernard Claverie was the founder and director of the Bordeaux Cognitique Institute (2003-2009) and of the ENSC (2009-2019).
