= Jules Carvallo =

French engineer

Jules Carvallo (1820 in Talence, Gironde – 1916) was a French engineer.

After having graduated with the highest honors at the École Polytechnique and École des Ponts et Chaussées, he was attached as engineer to the Southern Railroad; and under his direction the lines from Tech to Rivesaltes and from Tet to Perpignan were built, including the remarkable viaduct of Bouzanne. Afterward Carvallo became director of the work of canalizing the Ebro (Spain); and he established in the delta of that river a system of irrigation which permitted the cultivation of enormous tracts of land hitherto unproductive. From Spain Carvallo went to Italy, where he directed the works of the Roman railroads. On his return to Spain he was entrusted with the building of the line from Pamplona to Zaragoza, and later became the chief engineer of a Spanish water company.

Carvallo was the author of many dissertations printed in the Comptes-Rendus do l'Académic des Sciences and in many other scientific publications. Among his numerous contributions the most noteworthy were those on the piling up and solidification of embankments; on the formula of the maximum of stability and minimum of expense in public works; on the laws of oscillation of chain bridges, etc.

Amid his numerous works, Carvallo found time to devote himself to Jewish interests. He was one of the founders of the Alliance Israélite Universelle, and for many years served on the executive committee of that institution. He was a Saint-Simonian. According to M. Chouraqui, he was considered too open to Christianity, in that he considered the possibility that Jesus had a mission from providence.
