= Popscene (club) =

British indie dance club

Promotional flyer

Popscene was a British indie dance club part of the 1990s Britpop movement.

== History ==
The founders of Popscene were Dave McCarthy and Mac Be, who were the promoters and DJs for its entirety. Be explained on a Facebook post that, "It was myself and Dave at first, then Dave's girlfriend Jenny started doing a bit in the later years before we parted company in May 2000."

Prior to Popscene, McCarthy and Be had organized "Happy," a pre-Britpop night at The Clapham Grand for the Mean Fiddler organisation. "Happy" featured early live London appearances by bands such as The Verve and followed a club night structure similar to the acid house "PA" appearance model.

In 1994, the owners of Astoria in London's Charing Cross Road asked the duo to produce Friday nights at the LA2 club within the Astoria complex. The club's opening night featured free entry, which led to the venue reaching capacity. With a strict policy of "no live bands," the club went on to run with weekly capacity crowds for the next five years. The club attracted more than 300,000 customers over its lifespan; hours-long entry queues of hundreds of people were common. Popscene's DJ sets laid the foundations for the rock/dance crossover of the next decade; the tagline on many of the distinctive flyers was "the dance club for people who like bands."

Popscene's name originated from the single by Blur. It became synonymous with the Britpop movement, along with its retro-themed rival Blow Up. Members of bands popular within the scene, such as Oasis, Blur, and Manic Street Preachers, were regular customers at both clubs. Popscene deliberately avoided a separate VIP area, emphasizing that everyone was equal inside. "Sophie Ellis-Bextor came up to me and went, "I’m going to be a singer, I just sung Noel Gallagher ‘Wonderwall’ and he thought it was fantastic"' McCarthy recalled in an interview with DJ Mag.

The night was also notable for the DJs taking centre stage in the venue. The DJs' accessibility led to patrons taking to the stage and dancing alongside the DJ decks. In response, the club developed a special "flying decks" setup suspended from the in-house lighting rig.

The DJ duo of McCarthy and Be were the first successful UK club DJs to move from vinyl to CD and gave Erol Alkan his first opportunity to play to large crowds. McCarthy was the first London club DJ to play what became known as bootleg/mash-up tracks with cut-ups he made using the first available editions of Acid sound production software in 1999. The club was also host to the first ever public playback of the third Oasis album, Be Here Now.

== Reception ==
The Evening Standard magazine described the crowd as fun, noting their enthusiastic energy. The mid-Nineties UK MTV Magazine commented on the event, stating, "cigarettes, alcohol and lots of snogging are the order of the night". Time Out called Popscene "the indie superclub with an altogether hipper vibe" and UK Club Guide described it as having "a thriving, begging-for-it happy crowd... It's the busiest indie club in the country." As Popscene developed over its five-year lifespan, it was cited as one of the major breakthrough clubs in London (along with the Heavenly Social) for the Big beat music genre in the latter part of the decade.

== Legacy ==
In 2004, BBC Radio London's mid-morning DJ Robert Elms asked his audience which clubs had been culturally most important to his listeners. All cited Popscene as the defining London club of the era.

In the summer of 2007, a sold-out revival of Popscene was held in the original venue without the involvement of founder McCarthy, who had developed a subsequent career as DJ producer IDC.

== See also ==
- List of electronic dance music venues
