= Canton of Talence =

Coordinates: 44.81°N 0.59°W

The canton of Talence is an administrative division of the Gironde department, southwestern France. Its borders were modified at the French canton reorganisation which came into effect in March 2015. Its seat is in Talence.

It consists of the following communes:

1. Bègles (partly)
2. Talence
