= Talence =

- Commune
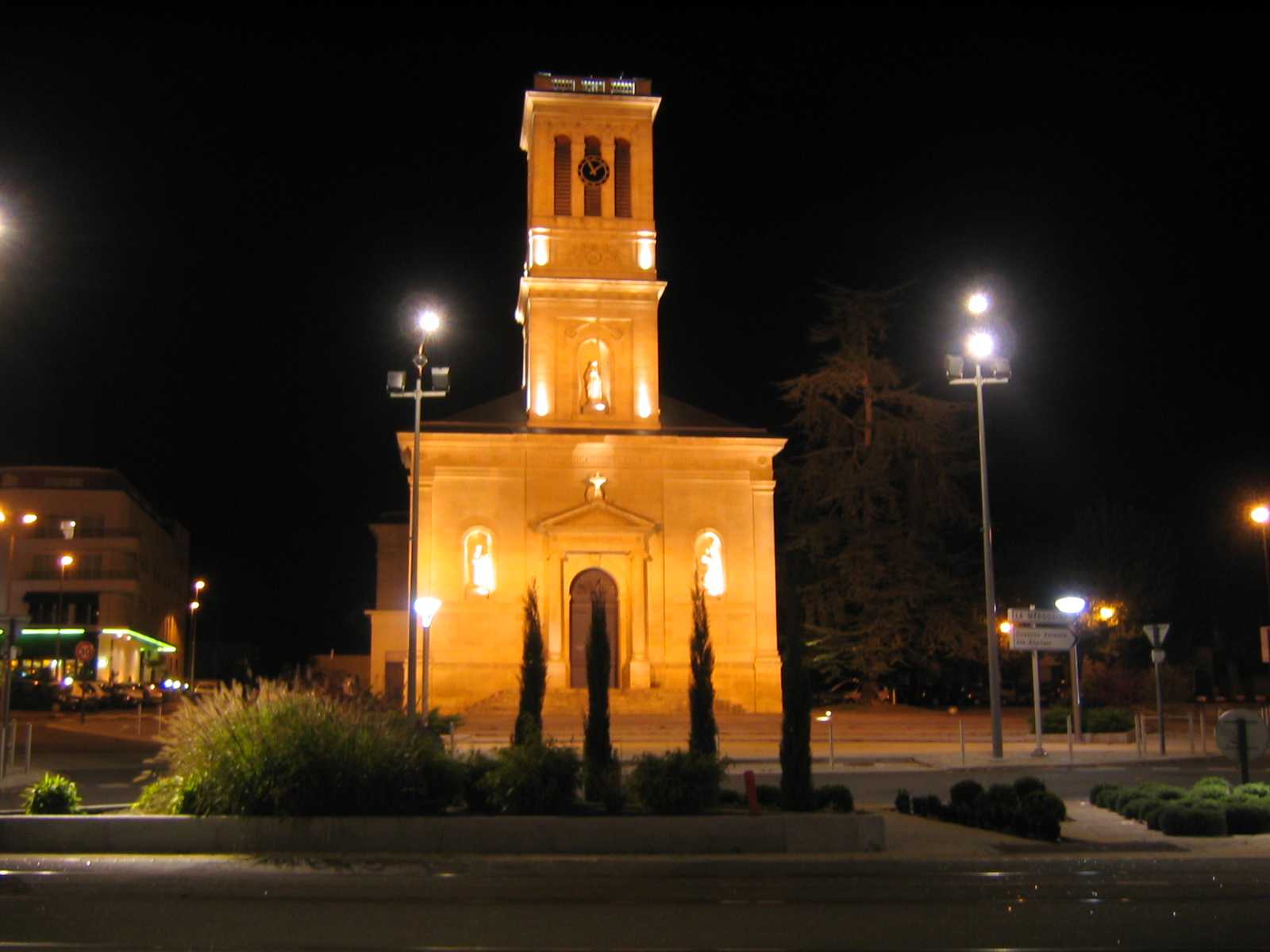
- The church in Talence

- Coat of arms
- Location of Talence
- Location within France Location within Nouvelle-Aquitaine
- Coordinates: 44°48′00″N 0°35′02″W
- Country: France
- Region: Nouvelle-Aquitaine
- Department: Gironde
- Arrondissement: Bordeaux
- Canton: Talence
- Intercommunality: Bordeaux Métropole

Government
  - Mayor (2020–2026): Emmanuel Sallaberry
- Area^{1}: 8.35 km^{2} (3.22 sq mi)
- Elevation: 15 m (49 ft)
- Highest elevation: 29 m (95 ft)
- Lowest elevation: 2 m (6.6 ft)
- Population (2023): 46,338
  - Density: 5,550/km^{2} (14,400/sq mi)
- Demonym(s): Talençais·e (French) talancés, talancesa (Occitan)
- Time zone: UTC+01:00 (CET)
  - Summer (DST): UTC+02:00 (CEST)
- INSEE/Postal code: 33522 /33400
- ^{1} French Land Register data, which excludes lakes, ponds, glaciers > 1 km^{2} (0.386 sq mi or 247 acres) and river estuaries.

Talence (French pronunciation: [talɑ̃s], locally [taˈlãⁿsə]; Occitan: Talança, [taˈlansɔ]; Catalan: Talença [tǝˈlensǝ]) is a commune in the department of Gironde, administrative region of Nouvelle-Aquitaine, France.

It is the third-largest suburb of the city of Bordeaux, and is adjacent to it on the south side. It is a member of the Bordeaux Métropole.

Talence is the home of Décastar, a prestigious yearly international decathlon event.

In Talence, there are different universities: Bordeaux University, Architecture School of Bordeaux and KEDGE Business School.

== Population ==
Historical population

Year	Pop.	±% p.a.
1793	1,489	—
1800	1,181	−3.26%
1806	1,340	+2.13%
1821	1,194	−0.77%
1831	1,322	+1.02%
1836	1,288	−0.52%
1841	1,232	−0.89%
1846	1,402	+2.62%
1851	1,434	+0.45%
1856	1,693	+3.38%
1861	2,430	+7.50%
1866	2,577	+1.18%
1872	3,604	+5.75%
1876	3,873	+1.82%
1881	4,621	+3.59%
1886	6,642	+7.53%
1891	7,921	+3.58%
1896	9,221	+3.09%
1901	11,227	+4.02%

Year	Pop.	±% p.a.
1906	11,832	+1.06%
1911	13,224	+2.25%
1921	15,823	+1.81%
1926	17,130	+1.60%
1931	18,944	+2.03%
1936	20,380	+1.47%
1946	21,650	+0.61%
1954	22,695	+0.59%
1962	25,874	+1.65%
1968	29,161	+2.01%
1975	34,127	+2.27%
1982	34,692	+0.23%
1990	34,485	−0.07%
1999	37,210	+0.85%
2007	40,940	+1.20%
2012	41,358	+0.20%
2017	42,606	+0.60%
2023	46,338	+1.41%

Source: EHESS and INSEE (1968-2023)

== Geography ==
Talence is situated with Bordeaux to the North, Bègles to the East, Villenave-d'Ornon to the South-East, Gradignan to the South-West, and Pessac to the West.

== Climate ==
Climate data for Talence (1981–2010 averages, extremes 1959–present)
Month	Jan	Feb	Mar	Apr	May	Jun	Jul	Aug	Sep	Oct	Nov	Dec	Year
Record high °C (°F)	21.0 (69.8)	25.0 (77.0)	28.0 (82.4)	30.5 (86.9)	35.0 (95.0)	39.0 (102.2)	39.0 (102.2)	39.5 (103.1)	36.8 (98.2)	32.0 (89.6)	26.0 (78.8)	22.6 (72.7)	39.5 (103.1)
Mean daily maximum °C (°F)	10.4 (50.7)	12.1 (53.8)	15.4 (59.7)	17.8 (64.0)	21.8 (71.2)	25.0 (77.0)	27.4 (81.3)	27.3 (81.1)	24.5 (76.1)	19.9 (67.8)	13.8 (56.8)	10.6 (51.1)	18.9 (66.0)
Daily mean °C (°F)	6.7 (44.1)	7.7 (45.9)	10.4 (50.7)	12.5 (54.5)	16.4 (61.5)	19.5 (67.1)	21.7 (71.1)	21.5 (70.7)	18.7 (65.7)	15.0 (59.0)	9.8 (49.6)	7.0 (44.6)	13.9 (57.0)
Mean daily minimum °C (°F)	3.0 (37.4)	3.3 (37.9)	5.4 (41.7)	7.2 (45.0)	11.0 (51.8)	14.0 (57.2)	15.9 (60.6)	15.8 (60.4)	12.8 (55.0)	10.2 (50.4)	5.8 (42.4)	3.5 (38.3)	9.0 (48.2)
Record low °C (°F)	−14.6 (5.7)	−12.0 (10.4)	−6.8 (19.8)	−2.2 (28.0)	1.1 (34.0)	5.1 (41.2)	7.5 (45.5)	6.0 (42.8)	4.0 (39.2)	−2.0 (28.4)	−6.5 (20.3)	−11.4 (11.5)	−14.6 (5.7)
Average precipitation mm (inches)	81.5 (3.21)	68.8 (2.71)	63.6 (2.50)	79.0 (3.11)	70.1 (2.76)	57.3 (2.26)	47.4 (1.87)	52.6 (2.07)	75.6 (2.98)	81.2 (3.20)	98.0 (3.86)	98.4 (3.87)	873.5 (34.39)
Average precipitation days (≥ 1.0 mm)	12.3	10.3	11.1	11.7	10.9	8.2	7.3	7.4	9.4	10.7	12.3	12.1	123.7
Source: Météo France

== Sights ==
- Jardin botanique de Talence

== Personalities ==
- Romain Brégerie, footballer
- Mireille Bousquet-Mélou, mathematician
- José Bové, radical activist
- Jérôme Cahuzac, politician
- Jules Carvallo, engineer
- Gérald Cid, footballer
- Émile Durkheim, sociologist, lived from 1887 to 1897 in Talence
- Henrik, Prince Consort of Denmark
- Florian Marange, professional footballer. He plays for the left side defender at SC Bastia
- Thierry Meyssan, writer
- Ed Tourriol, cartoonist

== International relations ==
Talence is twinned with:

- Trikala, Greece
- Alcalá de Henares, Spain
- Chaves, Portugal

== See also ==
- Communes of the Gironde department
