= Hôtel de Ville, Bègles =

Town hall in Bègles, France

Hôtel de Ville
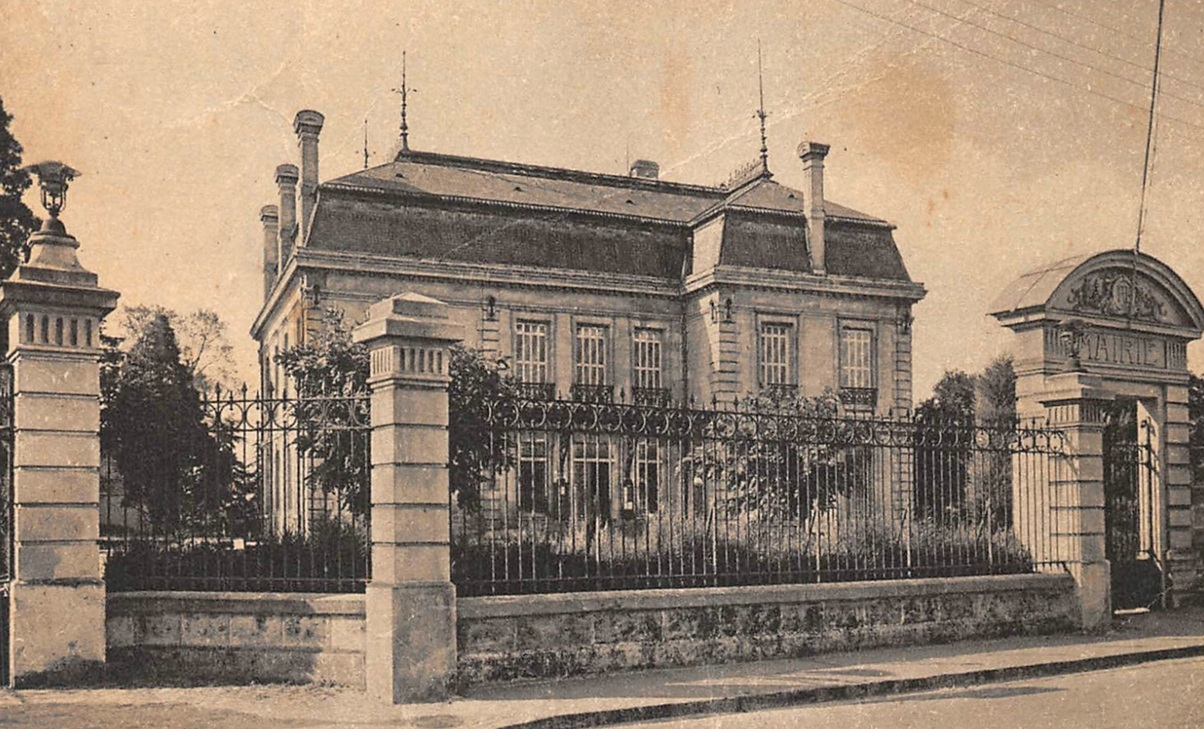
- The main frontage of the Hôtel de Ville
- Interactive map of the Hôtel de Ville area

General information
- Type: City hall
- Architectural style: Neoclassical style
- Location: Bègles, France
- Coordinates: 44.8082°N 0.5434°W
- Completed: 1862

The Hôtel de Ville (French pronunciation: [otɛl də vil], City Hall) is a municipal building in Bègles, Gironde in southwestern France, standing on Rue Calixte-Camelle.

== History ==
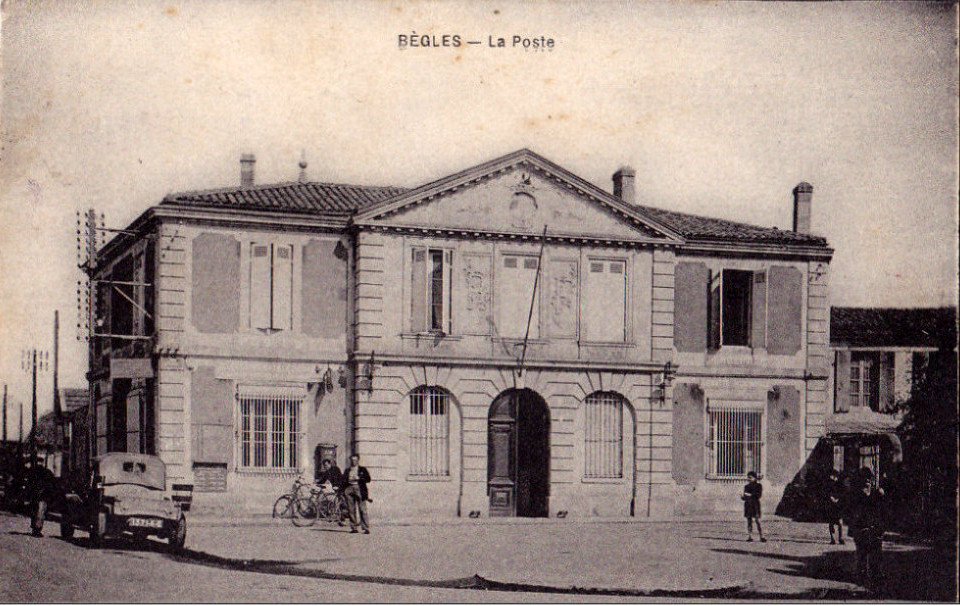
The old town hall

Following the French Revolution, the parish priest, Marc Daguzan, served as the mayor and allowed meetings of the town council to take place in the Church of Saint-Pierre in what is now Place du Général de Gaulle. Meetings subsequently took place in the home of the mayor at the time until the early 1860s, when the town council decided to commission a dedicated town hall. The site they selected, on Place du 14-Juillet, was occupied by the home of a former mayor, Pierre Durcy. Construction started with the demolition of the house in 1862. The new building was designed by Pierre Charles Brun in the neoclassical style, built in ashlar stone and was officially opened by the mayor, François Basile de Chapelle, in 1865.

The design involved a symmetrical main frontage of five bays facing onto the square. The central section of three bays, which was slightly projected forward, featured a round headed doorway with voussoirs and a keystone flanked by a pair of round headed windows, also with voussoirs and keystones. On the first floor, there were three casement windows and, at roof level, there was a modillioned pediment with a clock in the tympanum. The outer bays were fenestrated in a similar style.

The building also served as the local post office and as a lock-up for petty criminals. The Minister of Commerce, Fernand Dubief, gave a speech there on 14 July 1905. After the building was no longer required for municipal use, it served as a tax office from 1927 and later as a community centre known as the Tiers-Lieu (Third Place) from 2016.

In the mid-1920s, the council led by the mayor, Alexis Capelle, decided to acquire a more substantial municipal building. The building they selected was Château Bellevue on Rue Calixte-Camelle. The building was commissioned as a private residence. It had been designed in the neoclassical style, built in ashlar stone and was completed in 1862.

The design involved an asymmetrical main frontage of six bays facing onto Rue Calixte-Camelle with the last two bays on the right projected forward. It was fenestrated by tall casement windows on both floors and featured a hip roof. After it was acquired by the council in 1926, a doorway in the third bay on the left became the main entrance and a wide canopy was fitted to that bay and to the bays that flanked it. Internally, the principal room was the Salle du Conseil (council chamber).

In December 1984, two of the outbuildings attached to the town hall were attacked and damaged by arsonists.
