= Hôtel de Ville, Villenave-d'Ornon =

Town hall in Villenave-d'Ornon, France

Hôtel de Ville
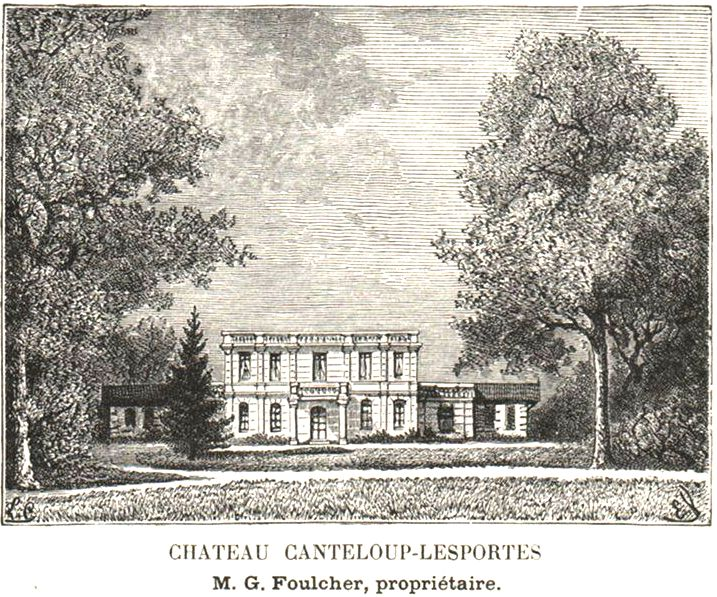
- The main frontage of the Hôtel de Ville in the early 20th century
- Interactive map of the Hôtel de Ville area

General information
- Type: City hall
- Architectural style: Neoclassical style
- Location: Villenave-d'Ornon, France
- Coordinates: 44.7828°N 0.5716°W
- Completed: 1777

The Hôtel de Ville (French pronunciation: [otɛl də vil], City Hall) is a municipal building in Villenave-d'Ornon, Gironde, in southwestern France, standing on Rue du Professeur Calmette.

== History ==
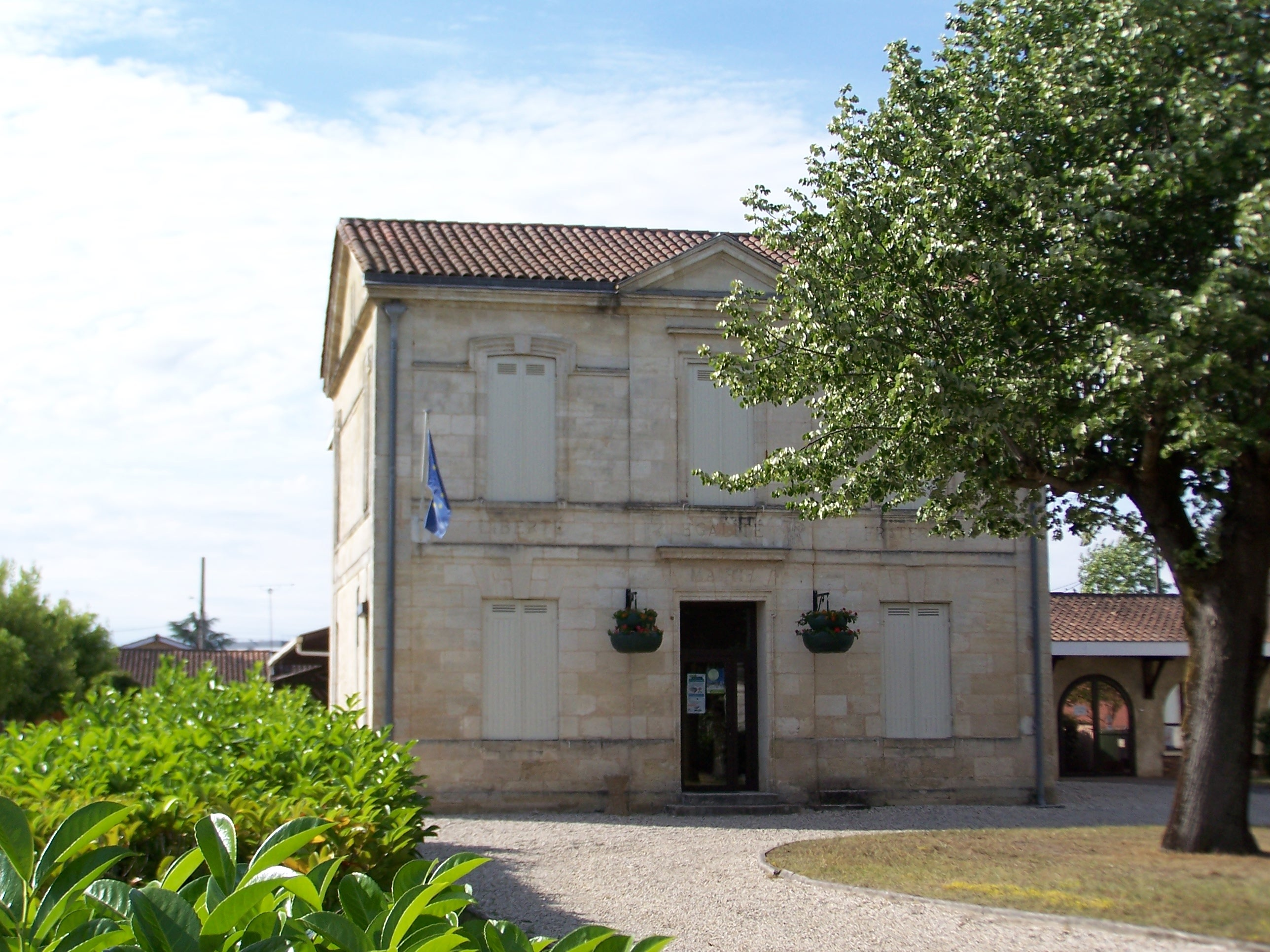
The old town hall

Following the French Revolution, the town council initially met at the house of the mayor at the time. In 1875, after finding this arrangement unsatisfactory, the council decided to commission a dedicated town hall. The site selected, on what is now Avenue du Maréchal Foch, was in the heart of the old part of the town. The new building was designed in the neoclassical style, built in ashlar stone and was completed in 1877.

The design involved a symmetrical main frontage of three bays facing onto the street. The central bay, which was slightly projected forward, featured a square headed doorway with a moulded surround and a cornice on the ground floor, a square headed window with a moulded surround and a cornice on the first floor and a pediment at roof level. The outer bays were fenestrated by square headed windows with a keystones and voussoirs on the ground floor and by segmental headed windows with keystones and hood moulds on the first floor. The town hall also accommodated the school teacher's office: the school operated from an adjacent building on the same site.

A war memorial, in the form of an angel on a pedestal, was unveiled in front of the town hall on 21 May 1922. On 25 May 1944, during the Second World War, German troops burst into the school teacher's office and arrested the teacher, Marc Dulout, on the basis that he was a member of the French Forces of the Interior. He was imprisoned in Fort du Hâ and then deported to Dachau concentration camp where he died. This was three months before the liberation of the town by the French Forces of the Interior on 28 August 1944.

In 1959, after finding the old town hall cramped, the council decided to acquire a more substantial building. The building they selected was the Château de Canteloup on Rue du Professeur Calmette. The estate had been owned by the Lesportes family, who counted a lawyer to the Parliament of Bordeau among its members, in the 16th century. The site was developed as a vineyard and in the mid-18th century, then then-owners decided to commission a house on the site. The current building was designed in the neoclassical style, built in ashlar stone and was completed in 1777. By the late 19th century, the estate was known as Château Canteloup-Lesportes and was owned by a local wine grower, Gaston Foulcher.

The original design involved a symmetrical main frontage of five bays facing onto Rue de la Source. The central bay featured a porch, formed by a pair of Doric order columns supporting an entablature and a balustraded balcony. There was a French door on the first floor, while the other bays were fenestrated by casement windows. There were quoins at the corners and, at roof level, there was a balustraded parapet. Following the acquisition by the council, a segmental pediment with a coat of arms in the tympanum was placed over the central bay. A Salle du Conseil (council chamber) was also established in the building.
