= International Detention Coalition =

- International Detention Coalition Inc.
- Abbreviation: IDC
- Formation: 16 March 2009; 17 years ago
- Founded at: Melbourne, Australia
- Type: Public Benevolent Institution
- Registration no.: 31857674815
- Legal status: incorporated association in Victoria
- Purpose: provides capacity-building support to global member network, conducts advocacy and provides expertise to support governments in meeting their international obligations to protect the rights of refugees, migrants and asylum seekers held in immigration detention or at risk of detention
- Headquarters: 696 Bourke St
- Location: Melbourne, Australia
- Methods: capacity-building, advocacy
- Members: 400+ in 100 countries
- Director: Carolina Gottardo
- Treasurer: Anne Harison
- Chair: Kaajal Ramjathan-Keogh
- Board of directors: Kaajal Ramjathan-Keogh, Evan Jones, Hayat Akbari, Alice Nah, Sebastiaan van der Zwaan, Anne Harison
- Main organ: IDC Committee (Board), International Advisory Committee (IAC)
- Subsidiaries: Stichting International Detention Coalition (Netherlands)
- Affiliations: European Alternatives to Detention Network
- Budget: AUD 1,797,212 (2023)
- Revenue: AUD 1,748,286 (2023)
- Expenses: AUD 1,764,508 (2023)
- Staff: 17 (Secretariat in Australia) (2023)
- Volunteers: 20 (Australia) (2023)
- Website: idcoalition.org

The International Detention Coalition (IDC) is an incorporated not-for-profit organisation, forming a network of more than 400 non-governmental organisations, faith-based groups, academics and individuals that provide legal, social, medical and other services, carry out research and reporting, and undertake advocacy and policy work on behalf of refugees, asylum seekers and migrants. These groups and individuals from more than 100 countries, have come together to form the IDC to share information and promote good practices and the greater use of international and regional human rights standards and principles as they relate to the detention of refugees, asylum seekers and migrants. This includes advocating for greater respect for the human rights of detainees, preventing and limiting the use of, seeking alternatives to, and using the least restrictive forms of, immigration detention.

The IDC Secretariat is based in Melbourne, Australia, with regional consultants based internationally.

== Mission ==
The IDC mission is to end immigration detention and advance rights-based alternatives, advocating for the human rights of affected individuals in partnership with civil society, governments, and UN agencies, with a vision of a world free from immigration detention where all migrants live with rights and dignity. The Coalition reaches these objectives through networking, advocacy, raising public awareness and researching and reporting on issues worldwide relating to the detention of refugees, asylum seekers and migrants.

== Vision and objectives ==
For the period 2023-2028, IDC members identified four core priorities:

- Strengthening the movement to end immigration detention and shifting power to grassroots communities
- Building support and commitment to end immigration detention
- Building expertise to end immigration detention and advance good practice
- Strengthening IDC’s organisational sustainability

== Background ==
Since the late 1990s organisations working in the field of immigration detention have discussed the need for better regional and international networking. In September 2003, several NGO representatives attending the UNHCR NGO Consultations in Geneva met to explore the formation of an international civil society coalition on immigration detention.UNHCR NGO Consultations During the 2004/05 Consultations, the process of establishing the coalition continued, and in September 2006 the International Detention Coalition was formally launched with an appointed Steering Committee.

The IDC was voluntarily run until September 2007, when the Steering Committee agreed to have the IDC hosted by another organization to help formalize it as an incorporated body. The Steering Committee received expressions of interest from five members before agreeing on a partnership with Oxfam Australia. Grant Mitchell was appointed as interim Coordinator in May 2008. In March 2009, the IDC became incorporated and established a Secretariat based in Melbourne, Australia. The Steering Committee became the International Advisory Committee, and the IDC Secretariat was formalised at this time, with Grant Mitchell appointed as Director, responsible for implementing IDC operations and providing executive support. The Secretariat is also supported by eleven Regional Representatives from twelve sub-regions, who support and help develop the work of the IDC at the regional level in a voluntary capacity.

IDC has had a United Nations Economic and Social Council consultative status since 2016.

== Work and impact ==
The IDC has been involved in training governments in Asia, Americas, Europe, MENA and Africa on human rights in immigration detention and alternatives to detention, and currently sits on the US government’s detention reform working group of the Department of Homeland Security as the only non-US group participating. The IDC’s work has been influential in putting alternatives to detention on the international UN agenda and on immigration detention policy reform and developments in USA, Belgium, Japan, Netherlands, Thailand and elsewhere.

The IDC also works on building the capacity of NGOs in more than 50 countries, including on alternatives to the detention of children. Many IDC members are under-resourced, have limited capacity and expertise in immigration detention. IDC work has included supporting and building the capacity of members through training, advocacy strategy meetings, regional network development and project development. The IDC co-chairs the Asia Pacific Refugee Right Network's Immigration Detention Working Group.

=== Focus areas ===
Following the strategic plan in the IDC's vision (see above), the Coalition has worked on coalition building, advocacy and campaign building, and capacity building.

==== Coalition building ====
The membership has grown to more than 250 members - including NGOs, service providers, community groups, academics and individuals. A large number of non-members receive updates on IDC activities, including the Office of the United Nations High Commissioner for Refugees (UNHCR), Office of the High Commissioner for Human Rights (OHCHR), National Human Rights Institutions (NHRIs) and various other stakeholders. The IDC distributes an e-newsletter, the International Detention Monitor, covering international detention news divided into regions, useful resources, member updates and a calendar of detention-relevant events, including the UN Special Procedures visits to various countries.

==== Advocacy and campaign building ====
The IDC's work has focused particularly on the impact of immigration detention on children and the need for alternatives to detention. It advocates through lobbying, submissions, research, media, member advocacy support and strategy meetings. This includes meetings and reports to numerous governments, national, regional and international bodies, including the European Union (EU), the Association of South-East Asian Nations (ASEAN), and UNHCR.

==== Capacity building ====
The IDC facilitates training, resources and skills-sharing, as well as targeted partner projects with and between members, with a particular focus on members in the Global South, where 95% of its members work. This includes training in detention standards, detention monitoring, advocacy and on working with detainees in a psychosocial capacity. The Asia Pacific region is a strategic focus because of the number of children detained. Capacity building work has extended to Africa, MENA and the Americas.

=== Research ===
The IDC has undertaken extensive research on the issue of immigration detention and assisted member research initiatives around the world.

==== Handbook on Implementing Alternatives to Detention ====
The Handbook on Implementing Alternatives to Detention was published in 2011. The aim of this research was to identify and describe examples of community-based alternatives to immigration detention. The research identified a range of mechanisms currently in use that can assist in preventing unnecessary detention by ensuring detention is only applied as the last resort in exceptional cases.

This research was launched in the first ever Global Alternatives to Detention Roundtable in Geneva in May 2011 to 15 governments, and is being launched and presented to governments in every region in 2011.

=== Child detention campaign ===
The IDC undertakes advocacy at the international, regional and national level on the need for alternatives to the detention of children. They have implemented projects aimed at improving the welfare of children in detention and encouraging policy change through demonstrating function alternatives.

The IDC developed a global campaign on the issue of children in migration related detention. The campaign includes a comprehensive research document conducted by a selection of their members in particular focus countries. In June 2012, a report was released: Captured Childhood: Introducing a new model to ensure the rights and liberty of refugee, asylum seeker and irregular migrant children affected by immigration detention.

==== Belgium ====
The IDC visited the 127bis Detention Centre in Belgium on 20 June 2008, and provided a report to the Belgian Government on a number of concerns regarding the regime, conditions and best interests of the children detained. On 25 February 2009, the IDC received a letter from the Immigration Minister, Annemie Turtelboom pledging to improve conditions in the detention centre.

Following a meeting with IDC Director Grant Mitchell, the Immigration Minister stated that 2008 would be the`last year during which children might be detained in closed centres for irregular immigrants’. In October 2008 the Belgian Government announced that children irregularly in the country would not be detained, but would be brought with their families to open housing.

==== Japan ====
Following the East Asian Alternative to Detention Roundtable in Seoul in April 2010, the Japanese government agreed to consider the release of unaccompanied minors held in immigration detention. In May, 2010, the Japanese government released all children from immigration detention, and later that year developed a pilot project to improve provisional release mechanisms for long-term detainees.

==== Malaysia ====
In October 2008, three Burmese refugee children in Malaysia who were about to be resettled to Australia were caught in a raid and detained in Lenggeng Detention Centre. Their mother was arrested at the same time but was later released, leaving the children alone in the centre with no caregiver. Through advocacy to the Australian Government, the IDC was able to assist the release of the children from detention, who arrived in Australia in February 2009 with their mother and siblings.

==== United States ====
Following the submission of the paper on the successful implementation of alternatives to detention in Australia, the Department of Homeland Security’s Immigration and Customs Enforcement (ICE) Agency contacted the Australian Government for further details of these developments in May 2009.

== Coalition members ==
The 2009 Annual Report totalled the number of members at 202. Currently the IDC currently has close to 250 members based in regions spanning Africa, Asia Pacific, Europe and Central Asia, Middle East and North Africa, North and South America. Members include national branches of the Jesuit Refugee Service, Amnesty International, Save the Children, Caritas, Danish Refugee Council, Global Detention Project, among others.

== See also ==
- Complete list of Coalition members
