= Philippe Galera =

French footballer (born 1967)

Personal information
- Full name: Philippe Galera
- Date of birth: October 18, 1967 (age 59)
- Place of birth: Bègles, France
- Height: 1.80 m (5 ft 11 in)
- Position: Midfielder

Senior career*
Years	Team	Apps	(Gls)
1985–1992	Libourne-Saint-Seurin	190	(51)
1992–1994	Chamois Niortais	43	(0)
- * Club domestic league appearances and goals

Philippe Galera (born October 18, 1967) is a retired professional footballer. He played as an attacking midfielder.
