= Industrial development certificate =

The Industrial Development Certificate (IDC) scheme was introduced by the UK government in the late 1940s to directly restrict the positions of sites on which companies could open factories.

== History ==
As a result of the Town and Country Planning Act 1947, an industrial development certificate (IDC) had to be obtained from the government (Board of Trade, and later the Department of Trade and Industry (formed in 1970) which became the Department of Industry in 1974) if a company wanted to expand an industrial plant beyond a regulated area of 5,000 square feet, before the company could seek planning permission for that industrial development. The planning permission could then be refused.

It allowed central government to have direct control over where industry could and could not be built. The government could influence the siting of industry. Companies were also encouraged to open new factories in a government-authorised Development Area, also known as an "assisted area". The Industry Act 1972 allowed areas of the UK to be given assistance for industrial development (Section 7 and Section 8). The Industrial Development Act 1966 and Local Employment Act 1970 also designated the areas where the government wanted industry to be sited.

On 4 December 1981, the IDC scheme was suspended, as it was believed by the government that it was a psychological barrier to new investment, although it was believed that the scheme had been of help in the 1960s and early 1970s. From 1969 to September 1975, out of 11,457 applications for an IDC, 523 were refused, a refusal rate of 4.6%. From 1975 to 1981, out of 7,000 applications for an IDC, only 28 had been refused - a refusal rate of 0.4%.

One study found that only 18% of Industrial Development Certificate refusals resulted in the project being moved to a target area. Half were scaled down so as to escape IDC control and 31% were cancelled, reorganised or abandoned. When the business was located in the government's desired areas, they were often marked by poor performance due to being at the ends of long supply chains and lacking an experienced local workforce.

Although not issued after 1981, IDCs were legally abolished under the Town and County Planning Act 1986.

== See also ==
- Industrial Organisation and Development Act 1947
- Industry Act 1975
