= Urban Rivals =

- Developer: Acute Games
- Publisher: Acute Games
- Engine: Unity
- Platforms: Web, Mobile, PC
- Release: January 17, 2006
- Genre: Card Battler
- Modes: PvP, PvE

Urban Rivals is a massively multi-player online virtual trading card game. The game features over 2,000 characters with varying rarities and abilities to discover, collect and level up by fighting live against players from all over the world. It also has an active market, where players can buy cards from other players or put their own cards up for sale.

In September 2022, the game was given a "soft-reboot" under the name Urban Rivals WORLD.

== History ==
Urban Rivals is a multiplayer trading card game which was created by Acute Games (previously known as Boostr). The very first versions of the game were based on iMode and WAP mobile platforms. In 2006, the game was ported onto the internet, integrating major improvements to its gameplay. Mobile versions for iPhone and Android were launched respectively in 2010 and 2011.

== General information ==
Urban Rivals is an online multiplayer card game. Each card represents a character (many of which are based on real people or well-known fictional characters). Each character has specific Power and Damage values, and belongs to a clan. Each clan has a special bonus, which is shared by every card in that clan. Most cards also have abilities that aid in battles, some of which counter or are triggered by other cards' abilities.

Free registration gives a player 8 character cards; more cards can be purchased later using the in-game currency, called 'Clintz', or through random packs using the premium currency, called Credits. 4 new characters are added every two weeks, and included in the 'New Blood' pack in the shop, which contains the 35 most recent additions to the game. In addition, every year, a new clan is released. During the introduction of the new clan, 4 (previously 6) new characters from that clan are added to every release for the first two weeks.

The game uses affiliate marketing to encourage existing players to recruit or sponsor new players.

An associated webcomic is posted occasionally on the Urban Rivals official website. Sometimes this comic gives out hints of a new character or clan.

The last Flash client for Urban Rivals was as3 which, unlike its predecessor, featured ambient music, additional sound effects, and animations displaying the effects of the characters' abilities. When the game transitioned to HTML5, all features from the previous client have been retained.

== Gameplay ==
A player battling against an AI opponent

At the start of a battle, 4 cards are randomly dealt from each of the two players' decks, usually made up of 8 cards. The cards in each player's deck are limited by the format's star count. Each card has a star count, from 2 to 5, and the total star count of a deck can be either 25 (called T1) or unlimited (called T2). The player with the higher star count between their 4 cards plays first in the first round, with both players alternating between playing first or second each subsequent round. In addition, each player starts the battle with 12 Pillz, with 1 free Pillz given at the start of each round, and 12 Life, except in ELO Fighting Championship, where each player begins with 14 Life.

Each player, one after the other, chooses one card and plays a number of 'Pillz' (minimum 1), resulting in an Attack value equal to the card's Power value multiplied by the number of Pillz used. The two cards' abilities and bonuses may affect either card's Power, Attack or Damage values, or even cancel their abilities or bonuses. In a random fight, the card with the greater Attack value has a greater chance of winning the round and dealing its Damage value to the opponent's Life Points. In a non-random fight, the card with the greater Attack value always wins the round and deals its Damage value to the opponent's Life Points. All competitive fights are set to non-random. If there is a tie for Attack value, the card with the lower star count wins. If there is still a tie for star count, whichever was played first wins. The battle ends after 4 rounds, with the winner being the player with the greater number of Life Points remaining. The battle also ends once either player loses all of their Life Points, called a KO.

After the end of each battle, players receive Battle Points (BP). These points determine the player's level. More points are earned from having a card defeat an opponent's card with more stars, or having one of the characters level up after a fight. A bonus is given for winning a battle by KO and/or with unused Pillz, but a penalty is incurred for losing a battle by timeout or forfeit.

Characters receive experience (XP) after each fight, with which they can level up and become stronger. The character level is represented by stars, with most characters starting at one star and the maximum number of stars ranging from 2 to 5. Characters earn more XP by winning a fight, and even more if they do so against an opponent with more stars. Many characters also receive an ability to help them in battle once they reach their maximum level, though some receive their ability earlier, in which case that ability may improve with each level up.

A player's level is based on their cumulative number of Battle Points (BP). When a player reaches Level 5, they can join a Guild. Upon reaching Level 10, they can create their own Guild. Upon reaching Level 15, they can take part in ELO Fighting Championship. Players also receive a Leader card when they reach certain levels.

== Tournaments, events and missions ==
Besides free fights, there are tournaments occurring every two hours, where players compete against each other to score the most Battle Points within one hour. There are also restrictions on deck-building for the tournament. At the end of each tournament, participating players will be able to win Clintz (used to buy cards from other players), Cryptocoinz (introduced in September 2018, used to buy Collector cards), and free Credits (used to buy card packs) based on their final rankings. Top 150 players will split the tourney jackpot, also based on their final rankings.

There is also a more strategy-based weekly ELO Fighting Championship (previously known simply as ELO), with stricter deck-building rules, such as the star count limit of 25 (as in T1) and the fact that certain cards cannot be used, based on weekly player vote and staff regulation. In EFC, there are six zones based on players' points accumulation, namely "Dark Corners", "ChocoMuscle Ring", "Danger Zone", "EFC Tower", "Polit Arena", and "Z Palace". Each zone has restrictions on the cards available for use. All players start off with 0 points, and are matched randomly against an opponent within 150 points of them. Players gain more points by defeating higher-ranked opponents, but will also lose more points if they lose to lower-ranked opponents. Players will also be required to play at least five EFC battles within a week to qualify for the EFC ranking of the week. There is no penalty for EFC inactivity, but players who do not play EFC within three days will be delisted from the ranking, and must play five EFC battles to re-qualify.

Each participating player will be able to win daily rewards from the EFC by playing EFC battles. These rewards include Battle Points, Clintz, and cards. At the end of each week, participating players will receive Clintz and Cryptocoinz, based on their final weekly rankings. EFC is also divided into seasons, which last for two weeks. At the end of each season, players will receive cards and Credits, based on their final season rankings, in addition to the weekly rewards.

On December 8, 2008, the game added a new Event creation feature, allowing players Level 40 and up to create their own customized tournaments. Rules can be set with a high degree of flexibility, in terms of scoring, matchmaking and more. The community has created more than 10,000 different Events in 3 months, with some of them based on story-telling, others on guild vs guild.

On December 18, 2009, the mission feature was introduced. Completing missions gives players a new way to receive cards, Clintz, and Credits. There are more than 1,000 missions, typically released with every new release of cards or a clan, or a few characters within each clan. These missions also include Legendary Missions, a series of four or five missions related to the clan, with the reward of a Legendary card upon completion (10 Credits if the player already has such a card). Legendary Missions are unlocked every few weeks or so, and last about a month.

On November 24, 2015, Arcade Mode was introduced. In this game mode, players are challenged to complete 12 series of 10 continuous battles against AI-controlled players, all of which are held in the headquarters of select clans, and are unlocked every week. Upon each battle victory, players can acquire stars for knocking out the opponent, finishing with at least 7 Life, or finishing with at least 3 Pillz. Players are also provided with two free continues which they can use to restart a battle they lost. Completing a HQ also allows players to replay that HQ in Hardcore mode, with no free continues and only one star available for each battle, but also with better completion rewards. Players can exchange the stars they have for rewards, from Clintz to cards (including exclusive Legendary cards).

=== Miss Clint City ===
An annual competition at Urban Rivals is held every year to crown the "Most Beautiful and Talented Woman of Clint City". The rules are very simple: All female characters released in the year are eligible for the contest. Players are able to vote which one, with the number of contestants later cut down to 8. Players then begin voting one out of the eight remaining contestants, who are further cut down to the final 3, where players vote again from these three, and finally the winner is announced sometime later. The winning character is eventually re-released as a card with a beauty pageant-themed artwork and a "Miss" tag before her name in celebration of her victory, while her original card remains available as it is.

In 2009, Miss Clint City was cancelled by the staff. After overwhelmingly negative responses from the players over the cancellation, the UR staff brought back Miss Clint City in 2010.

== Clans and characters ==
Clans of Urban Rivals refer to the groups fighting for supremacy in Clint City. Each clan has its own theme, unique roster of characters, and a shared bonus for every character within that clan. One new clan is introduced each year. There are a total of 36 clans in Urban Rivals as of March 2026. With the reintroduction of the game as Urban Rivals WORLD, almost all of the clans are reorganized into six factions: Guardians, Urbans, Activists, Psychos, Supernaturals, and Technophiles. Leader and Oculus, on the other hand, remain standalone clans.

Characters of Urban Rivals are represented in the form of cards. Each character represents a certain clan and has a unique background story, sometimes in relation to another character or a different clan. Each character also has Power and Damage stats varying between the characters, accompanied by various abilities to complement their respective clan's bonus, in addition to name banner colors that determine their rarity (Common, Uncommon, or Rare). There are a total of 2,483 characters available in the game as of June 2026.

These characters include 296 Collector cards (tagged Cr). They are discontinued cards that can no longer be purchased from the shop; therefore they must be obtained from other players in the Market, the weekly EFC draw, or card crafting. On some occasions, the staff announce which characters will be retired from the shop up to a few weeks in advance via the homepage news. In most scenarios, within 24 hours after the announcement, all existing sales of the upcoming Collector characters in the Market are cancelled, and any new sales of them are blocked. These characters can still be found from card packs after the announcement, and will eventually be removed from those packs on the specified date they go Collector, after which they are re-released in the form of new cards with an amber skin to better distinguish them from regular cards.

Also included in the character roster are Noel cards. They are cards that are given for free to active players every Christmas and are aptly given the "Noel" tag (from Noël, the French term for Christmas). They are usually based on a character that was released within the year. As the tag implies, these cards feature Christmas-themed artwork, and often have different stats and/or abilities to better distinguish them from their original versions. As with the Miss cards, the original versions of Noel cards remain available as they are.

In addition, there are a selection of Legendary cards (tagged Ld). Introduced in November 2010, they are special cards that can only be obtained through the completion of a series of clan-specific missions or from Arcade Mode, and can neither be traded nor sold. There are currently 69 Legendary cards, with each clan, except Leader, having at most two.

Formerly included in the entire character roster were Rebirth cards (tagged Rb). Introduced in January 2015, they were old characters that were re-released in the form of cards with new artwork, although their stats and abilities remained unchanged from their original versions. However, due to an overwhelming community vote, these cards were removed from the game in December 2016, with the Rebirth card illustrations having since been transferred to their respective original cards.

In May 2017, another type of cards was added to the game, called Mythic cards (tagged Mt). They were Collector cards that were re-released in the form of new cards with an emerald skin and a permanent 5x Clintz and/or XP boost when played in battle. These cards were considered the most difficult cards to get as they could only be acquired from the EFC or by trading with other players in the Market. The Mythic rarity was retired in March 2024 with the introduction of card crafting, with the former Mythic cards having since been reverted to the Collector rarity.

== Critical reception ==
Urban Rivals received 88% from Game Vortex, praising the typical five-minute game length, free access and poker-like element of the gameplay. However, the presentation was seen as functional, with inconsistent artwork quality and lack of sound.

Urban Rivals received 3.75/5 from MMOBomb, where they stated that Urban Rivals had stylish comic book art, fast-paced gameplay and a large playerbase. Though, Urban Rivals was also praised by some, as they stated that the game had 'amazing artwork' and was a 'very addicting' game.
