= Galera, Gaià =

Galera
- Singular population entity
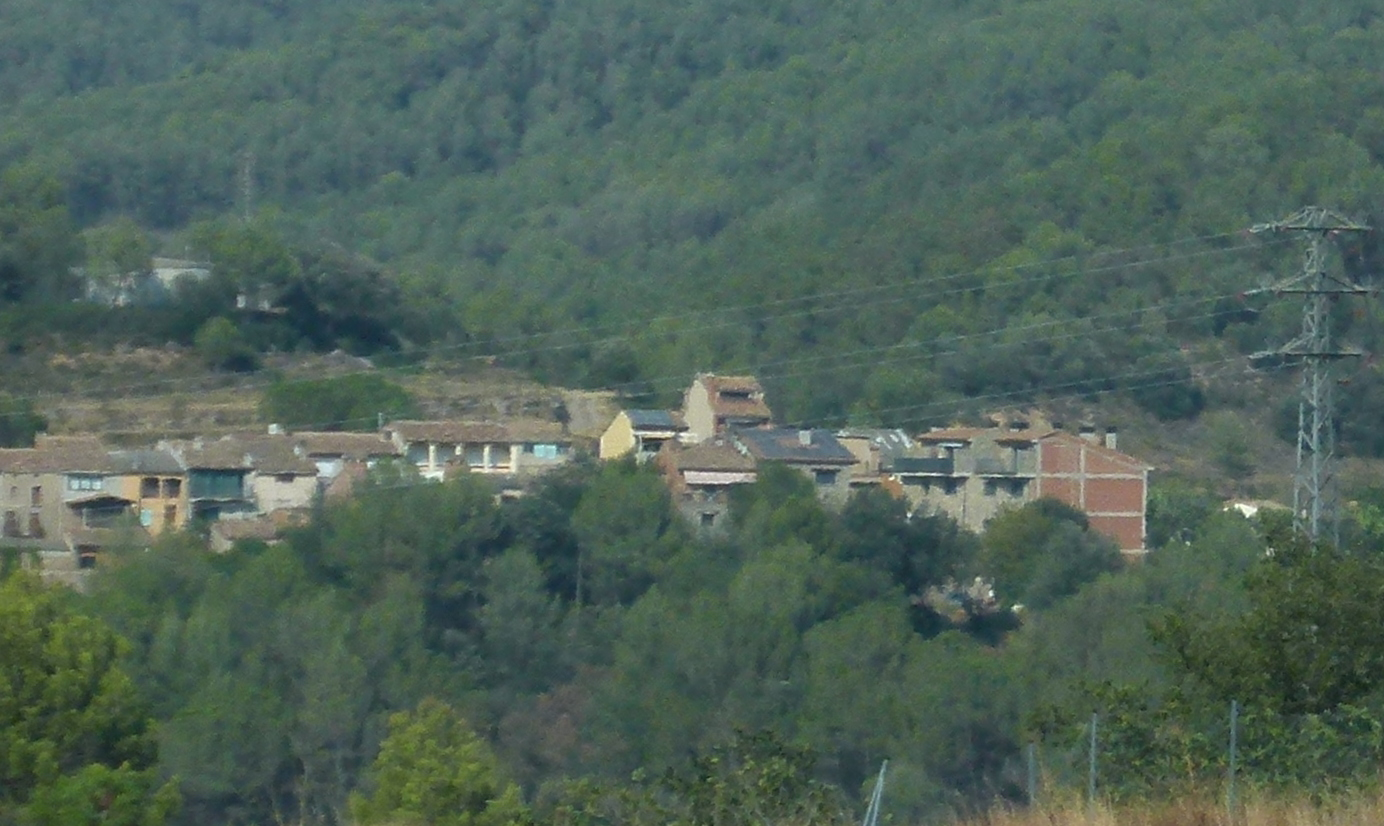
- View of Galera

- Location within Spain Location within Catalonia Location within Province of Barcelona
- Coordinates: 41°54′45.9″N 1°53′17.0″E
- Country: Spain
- A. community: Catalunya
- Province: Barcelona
- Municipality: Gaià

Population (January 1, 2024)
  - Total: 70
- Time zone: UTC+01:00
- Postal code: 08672
- MCN: 08090000100

Galera is a singular population entity in the municipality of Gaià, in Catalonia, Spain.

As of 2024 it has a population of 70 people.
