= Montesquieu University =

Former French university

Coordinates: 44°47′52″N 0°37′5″W

- Université Montesquieu - Bordeaux IV
- University logo
- Type: Public
- Active: 1995–2014
- President: Jean-Pierre Laborde
- Academic staff: 400
- Students: 14,000
- Location: Bordeaux, France
- Campus: Pôle universitaire des sciences de gestion de Bordeaux
- Website: http://www.u-bordeaux4.fr/

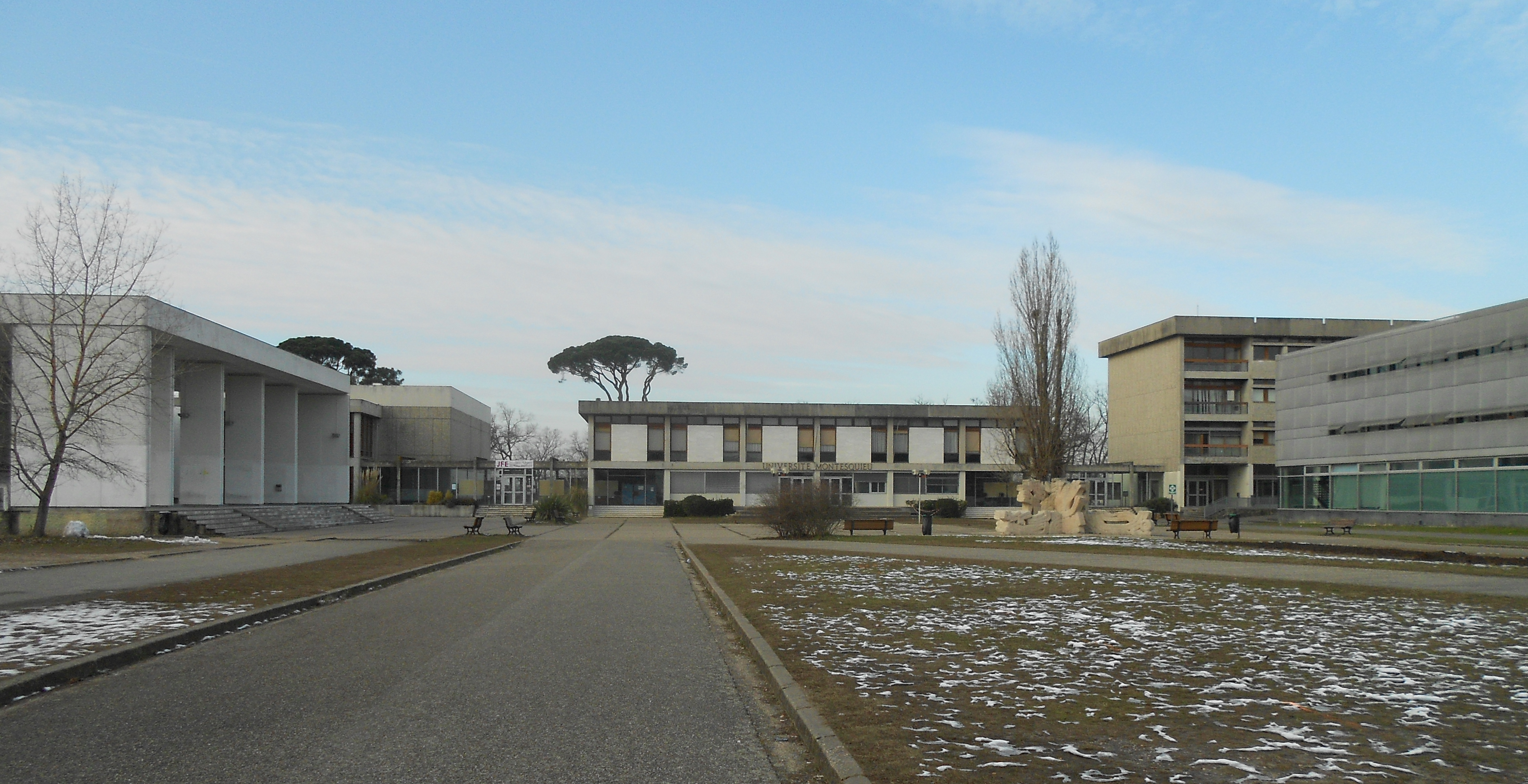
University campus in Pessac

Montesquieu University (French: Université Montesquieu), also known as Bordeaux IV (French: Bordeaux Quatre), was a French university, based in Pessac, the suburbs of Bordeaux. In 2014, it merged with the Bordeaux 1 and Bordeaux 2 to form the University of Bordeaux.

Named after the French lawyer and philosopher Montesquieu, Montesquieu University was the successor of the former Law and Economics Faculty, which origins go back as far as the 15th century. It incorporated long-standing teaching programmes and institutes which have an established reputation in the academic specialities of the university: law, political science, economics and management.

Montesquieu University was organised into 6 departments (UFR) in the areas of economics and management, law, and economic and social administration (AES), as well as an Institute of Business Administration (IAE), and 2 University Institutes of Technology (IUT). In addition, the Bordeaux Institute of Political Studies was also annexed to the university.

The university had 14,000 students and a staff of 400 teachers and researchers, with a non-academic staff of 300. It awarded around 4,100 diplomas each year at the various sites in Bordeaux itself, as well as at the satellite sites of Agen and Périgueux.

There were 12 government-recognised research centres at the university, some of which are attached to large research organisations such as the CNRS and the National Foundation of Political Science.

== See also ==
- List of public universities in France by academy
