= IDC (musician) =

English recording artist and DJ

IDC is David McCarthy, an English recording artist and DJ from London, England.

He has performed at European music festivals, appeared at club venues in Europe and Southeast Asia, and released electronic music internationally.

A major interview feature in leading international dance music publication DJ Mag declared "Electro iconoclast IDC isn't your typical DJ/producer – he's more like a multi-instrumentalist mix between Brian Wilson and DFA's James Murphy"

IDC's releases have consistently received 5 star press reviews, starting with his debut single 'Scratch', through to the release of his debut album 'Overthrow The Boss Class' in 2008 and continuing with subsequent album and single releases.

Second album 'The Sun Is Always Shining Above The Clouds' saw the world's biggest selling dance magazine Mixmag write "IDC is back with a rich and diverse album made across five studios over 18 months" and make lead single "Eins Deux Tres" 'Tune of the Month', describing it as "a beautifully compelling collage of Beach Boys-like vocal harmonies and electronic voices."

The album received an audiophile re-release in 2017 in an expanded re-mastered form addressing Loudness War issues which surrounded the original version.

The third album from IDC is expected in 2018.

== Recordings ==
IDC's debut single release 'Scratch' was likened to the output of DFA Records, described as "pushing the boundaries of electro-disco" in DJ Mag and was one of the last records to be championed by John Peel on his legendary BBC radio show.

2007 release "Stomp" was called "one seriously heavy slice of deviant dancefloor electro" in another 5 star review in iDJ, with crossover potential compared to The Prodigy in DJ Mag and named 'Record of the Week' in places ranging from UK dance music mag legend DMC Update to John Kennedy's X-Posure show on XFM.

The following single 'Akai Elvis' nudged the UK charts with DJ Mag writing "you can instantly hear why it's getting the same kind of response LCD Soundsytem's Losing My Edge got before it reached saturation levels."

=== Debut album ===
August 2008 saw the release of the debut IDC album 'Overthrow The Boss Class'. The ten track collection was recorded in London and Brighton, with McCarthy taking on all writing, performing and production duties, except for a guest vocal on the track 'Modern Touch' by Martin Andrews from the group 'Volunteer'. 'OTBC' was mastered at The Soundmasters by Streaky Gee, whose credits include The Prodigy, Fatboy Slim, Death in Vegas and The Stone Roses.

Once again superlative reviews followed, with a 5 star 'Recommended Album' review in International DJ Magazine calling it "2008's 'We Are the Night (Chemical brothers)'" and DJ Mag raving "there's a simplicity and fun to the production – a sense of delirious enjoyment rather that trying to be clever – that gives it an instantly accessible appeal."

DJ legend Mark Moore singled out the track 'Modern Touch' for particular praise in his monthly review column by writing "I shall go on record as declaring this as 2 minutes 53 seconds of perfect pop. Once it's over you just have to play it again... and again."

April 2009 saw the release of IDC's first post debut album material, with the track 'Imaginary Bones' being released as an extended single package featuring Lo Fidelity Allstars' Phil Ward on vocals on two distinct versions taken from different recording sessions, along with several remixes. The main 'dance' version featured heavily at various parties at WMC Miami. iDJ magazine said ""this raucous romp could well be IDC's biggest club monster to date" and DMC Update made it five star single of the week saying "this is the most pissed up, drugged up, headfuck of a record that I've heard in a very long time, it makes The Prodigy sound like they've got The X Factor."

The 'alternate version' featuring a full band and horn section picked up UK BBC Radio 1 airplay and led to a 'live band' session on John Kennedy's X-Posure show on XFM. The session featured three tracks recorded live at Capital Radio's Leicester Square studios, with McCarthy on bass and vocals joined by Seamus Murphy, Phil Ward and Martin Andrews.

2009 saw extensive periods in recording studios, with parts recorded in London, Brighton, Edinburgh and New York. The first fruits of these sessions was released as a 'free download' track the end of 2009. 'This Is Not A Riot' featured samples of crowd chants recorded at various demonstrations around the world, as well as the sampling of the LRAD Long Range Acoustic Device riot control sonic weapon.

The track received national UK radio airplay on BBC Radio 1 with Rob Da Bank calling it "revolutionary rave". and went on to be referenced as "riot-folk" by the world renown monthly magazine Fortean Times which officially acknowledged the track as the first-ever musical work to feature the LRAD.

June 2010 saw the release of single 'Daytime Radio Hit', ironically named due to the inclusion of the expletive-laden guest vocals of Holly from The New York Chimes which resulted in the only radio airplay coming from longtime supporter John Kennedy on XFM with an exclusively created 'bleeped' version. Dance press reviews continued to be highly positive, with iDJ calling it "jaunty electro boogie" and DJ Mag citing it as "an aptly-named DFA-style grooveathon."

=== Second album ===
The second IDC album 'The Sun Is Always Shining Above The Clouds' was released in August 2011. Mixmag wrote "IDC is back with a rich and diverse album made across five studios over 18 months" and DJ Mag called it "a brilliant work" giving a rating of 9 out of 10.

"Eins Deux Tres" was the lead single from the album and it was awarded 'Tune of the Month' in Mixmag describing it as "a beautifully compelling collage of Beach Boys-like vocal harmonies and electronic voices. There's a Mobyness about its uplifting chords while the range of quirky samples and strings are reminiscent of The Avalanches. The best tri-lingual track we've ever featured!". DJ Mag gave it 9/10 writing "an explosion of ELO strings over a 'One More Time' rhythm stomp, never mind 'Money Shot' of the month, I think this is 'Single of the Year'"

'TSIASATC' album track 'Everybody' was released as an EP in 2012 which included an extended version and several remixes. It was declared "an essential must-have electro package for 2012" in a 9/10 review in DJ Mag.

In 2013 'Everybody' appeared on the soundtrack of the motion picture Make your Move 3d.

Later in the year stand-alone single 'The Man with The Last Laugh' was released and received yet another 9/10 in DJ Mag: "This 21st century John Barry-style megatune gets a much deserved full release. The campaign for a dance track James Bond theme starts here!"

2014 saw the tenth anniversary of debut single 'Scratch' celebrated with a re-issue which included a brand new '2014TYL' version remixed by IDC. The other tracks from the original vinyl release were made available digitally for the first time.

'What's going On Here?' was released as a single in January 2015. It came backed with a live full-band version of 'Imaginary Bones'. 'Assemble The Musi8ians' followed later that year and 'Sugar Coated Bullet' was the most recent new material release in 2016.

== DJ ==
IDC's DJ career began around 2005 with guest headline sets at major electro clubs of the time such as Nag Nag Nag in London and Rio in Berlin, following on from the release of his acclaimed debut single.

Dates then extended around Europe, most notably headlining a dance stage at Szegit Festival in Budapest and beginning an ongoing series of regular headline appearances at the 3,000 capacity Sala 1 of Razzmatazz Barcelona, which he has now played on over 30 occasions.

One New Year's Eve set at Razzmatazz led to a two-page review in International DJ Magazine calling IDC "the future king of electronic rock'n'roll"

DJ Magazine ran a feature on IDC saying "he makes music that sounds like a washing machine on crack – no wonder the likes of Mark Moore, Erol Alkan, Radio One's Pete Tong and XFM's John Kennedy are all over his tunes" and dates continued around Europe and at major UK venues such as Together at Turnmills in London, Stealth in Nottingham and festivals such as Bestival.

International headline set at clubs such as Zouk Singapore and Volar Hong Kong extended IDC's reputation to SE Asia and further UK DJ dates, including 'special guest' support slots to 2ManyDJs and Calvin Harris, raised his profile at home, leading to a return to Bestival for a prime-time Friday night slot on the main Bollywood dance stage.

DJ Mag stated "IDC is a genius" and iDJ called him "clearly one of electronic music's finest purveyors".

Although 2013 onwards has been almost entirely dedicated to studio work, a reduced DJ schedule has subsequently included a special set at Razzmatazz Barcelona as part of the Stone Roses first official comeback gig and a number of London club dates.

== Discography ==
=== LPs ===
==== The Sun Is Always Shining Above The Clouds (2011) ====
Track listing :

- The Protagonists
- I Love
- Daytime Radio Hit
- Light The Place Up
- Eins Deux Tres
- Everybody
- If You Stand For Something (You Won't Fall For Anything)
- A Hollyoaks Life
- Imaginary Bones
- Culture Supervisor

==== Overthrow The Boss Class (2008) ====
Track listing :

- Slowride
- Scratched
- Stomp
- Modern Touch
- Boss Klass
- Recidivist
- Cutie
- Bolshy Beats
- Akai Elvis
- St Mawes

=== Singles ===
- Sugar Coated Bullet (2016)
- Assemble The Musi8ians (2015)
- What's Going On Here? (2015)
- Scratch 10YL EP (2014)
- The Man with the Last Laugh(2013)
- Everybody (2012)
- Eins Deux Tres (2011)
- Daytime Radio Hit (2010)
- This Is Not A Riot (2009)
- Imaginary Bones (2009)
- Modern Touch (2008)
- Bolshy Beats (2008)
- Akai Elvis – The Remixes (2008)
- Akai Elvis (2007)
- Stomp (2007)
- Payola (2005)
- Scratch (2004)

=== Other activity ===
IDC's own Brighton club residency "Dirty Weekend" was featured in a major undercover-filming news exposé on European satellite TV channel Sky News regarding the contemporary use of laughing gas in clubs in the UK. The story was picked up by UK national tabloid papers and the dance press and used by the authorities as a reason to clamp down on the sale of N_{2}O for recreational purposes.

Official IDC remix releases of other artists have appeared on major labels such as Sony/BMG, Universal, Astralwerks and EMI as well as on respected independent dance labels including Bad Life and Hottwerk.

Early notable unofficial mash-up re-workings included a version of The Ting Tings song "Great DJ", which used the unreleased demo version as the source material and became a big download hit via music blogs and the Hypemachine site well before the band became widely known.

IDC's initial illicit productions received radio airplay around the world, establishing him at the forefront of the UK bootleg movement and leading him to become one of the main contributors to the MTVMash weekly show for MTVNE, creating exclusive tracks for the two season series. His productions included the only official Outkast mash-up, "Hey Mug", which mixed Hey Ya! with English band The Streets and was cleared for use by Andre 3000 himself.
