= Bordeaux Segalen University =

Former French university

Coordinates: 44°49′32″N 0°36′21″W

- Université Bordeaux Segalen
- Type: Public
- Active: 1968–2014
- Endowment: € million
- Budget: € 171 million
- President: Manuel Tunon de Lara
- Faculty: 1,012
- Administrative staff: 1,291
- Students: 21,474
- Doctoral students: 449
- Location: 146 rue Léo-Saignat; 33076 Bordeaux Cedex; France, Bordeaux, Pessac, Villenave d'Ornon, Dax, France
- Website: www.univ-bordeauxsegalen.fr

Bordeaux Segalen University (French: Université Bordeaux Segalen; originally called University of Victor Segalen Bordeaux II) was one of four universities in Bordeaux (together with Bordeaux 1, Michel de Montaigne Bordeaux 3 and Montesquieu Bordeaux 4). In 2014, it merged with Bordeaux 1 and Bordeaux 4 to form University of Bordeaux.

Bordeaux Segalen was specialized in Life and Health Sciences and Human and Social Sciences.

It consisted of three UFRs of medicine, one UFR of pharmacy, one of odontology, one of human and social sciences (psychology, sociology, ethnology, educational sciences, cognitive sciences), one of mathematics applied to human and life sciences, one of life sciences (human biology, biology of extreme environments, neurosciences), one of oenology, one of sports sciences, a higher school of biotechnology (ESTBB) and three institutes, one of public health (ISPED), one for hydrotherapy (in Dax), and one for cognetics (cognitive engineering - IdC, now ENSC)

Since 2003, a team led by Dominique Martin of the Bordeaux University Hospital, has been rehearsing for the first human operation in zero gravity, using Zero-G aircraft. The operation is part of a project to develop surgical robots in space that are guided via satellite by Earth-based doctors. The project is developed with backing from the European Space Agency (ESA).

== Presidency ==
Succession of presidents:

- Prof. Henri Bricaud, elected on December 21, 1970
- Pr Jacques Latrille, elected on December 19, 1975
- Pr Jean Tavernier, elected October 19, 1980, re-elected February 15, 1982
- Pr Dominique Ducassou, elected on December 17, 1987
- Pr Jacques Beylot, elected on November 17, 1992
- Pr Josy Reiffers, elected on November 17, 1997
- Pr Bernard Bégaud, elected on September 30, 2002
- Pr Manuel Tunon de Lara, was elected on January 29, 2008.

== Points of interest ==
- Jardin botanique de Talence

== See also ==
- University of Bordeaux
- List of public universities in France by academy
- Victor Segalen
