= Ideographic Description Characters =

- Range: U+2FF0..U+2FFF (16 code points)
- Plane: BMP
- Scripts: Common
- Assigned: 16 code points
- Unused: 0 reserved code points
- Source standards: GBK (U+2FF0–U+2FFB only)

Unicode version history
- 3.0 (1999): 12 (+12)
- 15.1 (2023): 16 (+4)

Unicode documentation
- Code chart ∣ Web page

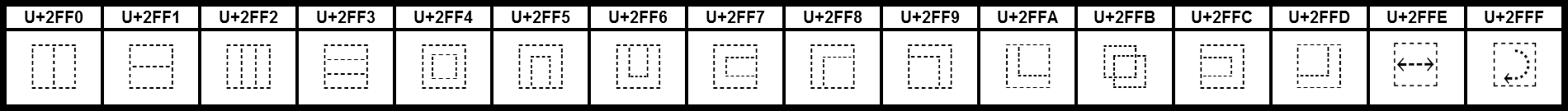
Graphical representation of the Unicode block "Ideographic Description Characters"

Ideographic Description Characters is a Unicode block containing graphic characters used for describing CJK ideographs. They are used in Ideographic Description Sequences (IDS) to provide a description of an ideograph, in terms of what other ideographs make it up and how they are laid out relative to one another. An IDS provides the reader with a description of an ideograph that cannot be represented properly, usually because it is not encoded in Unicode; rendering systems are not intended to automatically compose the pieces into a complete ideograph, and the descriptions are not standardized.

U+2FF0 to U+2FFB were introduced from GBK; U+2FFC to U+2FFF were devised later and introduced in Unicode 15.1 (2023).

== Block ==
Ideographic Description Characters^{[1]} Official Unicode Consortium code chart (PDF)
	0	1	2	3	4	5	6	7	8	9	A	B	C	D	E	F
U+2FFx	⿰	⿱	⿲	⿳	⿴	⿵	⿶	⿷	⿸	⿹	⿺	⿻	⿼	⿽	⿾	⿿
Notes: 1. As of Unicode version 17.0

== Ideographic Description Sequences ==
Ideographic Description Sequences are sequences of characters that represent a Chinese character structure as defined by the Unicode standard.

Below are the 16 characters as defined by Unicode in this block:

Unicode	Symbol	Meaning	Example 1	IDS	Example 2	IDS
U+2FF0	⿰	Two components combined left to right	相	⿰木目	𠁢	⿰丨㇍
U+2FF1	⿱	Two components combined above to below	杏	⿱木口	𠚤	⿱𠂊丶
U+2FF2	⿲	Three components combined left to middle and right	衍	⿲彳氵亍	𠂗	⿲丿夕乚
U+2FF3	⿳	Three components combined above to middle and below	京	⿳亠口小	𠋑	⿳亼目口
U+2FF4	⿴	One component fully wrapping another component	回	⿴囗口	𠀬	⿴㐁人
U+2FF5	⿵	One component surround three sides of another component (opening at bottom)	凰	⿵几皇	𧓉	⿵齊虫
U+2FF6	⿶	One component surround three sides of another component (opening at top)	凶	⿶凵㐅	义	⿶乂丶
U+2FF7	⿷	One component surround three sides of another component (opening at right)	匠	⿷匚斤	𧆬	⿷虎九
U+2FF8	⿸	One component surround top and left side of another component	病	⿸疒丙	𤆯	⿸耂火
U+2FF9	⿹	One component surround top and right side of another component	戒	⿹戈廾	𢧌	⿹或壬
U+2FFA	⿺	One component surround bottom and left side of another component	超	⿺走召	𥘶	⿺礼分
U+2FFB	⿻	Two components overlapped	巫	⿻工从	𣏃	⿻木⿻コ一
U+2FFC	⿼	One component surround three sides of another component (opening at left)	㕚	⿼叉丶	𬺹	⿼コ二
U+2FFD	⿽	One component surround bottom and right side of another component	氷	⿽水丶	斗	⿽十⺀
U+2FFE	⿾	Horizontal reflection	卐	⿾卍	𣥄	⿾正
U+2FFF	⿿	Rotation	𠕄	⿿凹	𠄔	⿿予

Two other related ideographic description characters are not encoded in this Unicode block, but of which may be used in ideographic description sequences:

Unicode	Symbol	Block	Meaning	Example 1	IDS	Example 2	IDS
U+303E	〾	CJK Symbols and Punctuation	Variant but not equivalent	㬵 (U+3B35)	〾胶 (U+80F6)	𫜵	〾爫
U+31EF	㇯	CJK Strokes	Subtraction	乒	㇯兵丶	𧰨	㇯豕一

There is also the character "⬚", encoded as U+2B1A. Although its name is simply "dotted square", it is frequently used alongside ideographic characters to denote indivisible, complete units.

This is the syntax of IDS in EBNF:

IDS := Ideographic | Radical | CJK_Stroke | Private Use | U+FF1F | IDS_UnaryOperator IDS | IDS_BinaryOperator IDS IDS | IDS_TrinaryOperator IDS IDS IDS 
CJK_Stroke := U+31C0 | U+31C1 | ... | U+31E3
IDS_UnaryOperator := U+2FFE | U+2FFF | U+303E
IDS_BinaryOperator := U+2FF0 | U+2FF1 | U+2FF4 | ... | U+2FFD | U+31EF
IDS_TrinaryOperator:= U+2FF2 | U+2FF3

== History ==
The following Unicode-related documents record the purpose and process of defining specific characters in the Ideographic Description Characters block:

Version	Final code points (Note: Proposed code points and characters names may differ from final code points and names)	Count	UTC ID	L2 ID	WG2 ID	IRG ID	Document
3.0	U+2FF0..2FFB	12		X3L2/95-111	N1284		Ideographic Structure Symbol (additional request), 1995-11-07
3.0	U+2FF0..2FFB	12			N1303 (html, doc)		Umamaheswaran, V. S.; Ksar, Mike (1996-01-26), "8.13 Ideographic structure symbols", Minutes of Meeting 29, Tokyo
3.0	U+2FF0..2FFB	12			N1348		Ideographic Components and Composition Scheme, 1996-02-05
3.0	U+2FF0..2FFB	12			N1357		Revised Ideographic Structure Symbols, 1996-04-12
3.0	U+2FF0..2FFB	12			N1353		Umamaheswaran, V. S.; Ksar, Mike (1996-06-25), "9", Draft minutes of WG2 Copenhagen Meeting # 30
3.0	U+2FF0..2FFB	12		L2/97-026	N1494		IRG proposal: Ideographic structure character, 1996-06-27
3.0	U+2FF0..2FFB	12			N1430	N365	Proposal Summary Form: Ideographic Structure Character, 1996-08-01
3.0	U+2FF0..2FFB	12			N1453		Ksar, Mike; Umamaheswaran, V. S. (1996-12-06), "9.6 Ideographic Structure Characters", WG 2 Minutes - Quebec Meeting 31
3.0	U+2FF0..2FFB	12		L2/97-023	N1486	N437	Resolutions of IRG Meeting #8, 1997-01-16
3.0	U+2FF0..2FFB	12			N1489		Supplement to Ideographic Components and Composition Schemes, 1997-01-16
3.0	U+2FF0..2FFB	12			N1490	N436	Response to WG2 question on Ideographic Structure Characters, 1997-01-16
3.0	U+2FF0..2FFB	12		L2/97-030	N1503 (pdf, doc)		Umamaheswaran, V. S.; Ksar, Mike (1997-04-01), "9.6", Unconfirmed Minutes of WG 2 Meeting #32, Singapore; 1997-01-20--24
3.0	U+2FF0..2FFB	12		L2/97-114	N1544 (html, doc)	N453	Sato, T. K. (1997-04-08), Questions on the "Han structure method" described in WG2 N1490 (IRG N436)
3.0	U+2FF0..2FFB	12		L2/97-255R			Aliprand, Joan (1997-12-03), "4.B.2 Ideographic Structure Characters", Approved Minutes – UTC #73 & L2 #170 joint meeting, Palo Alto, CA – August 4-5, 1997
3.0	U+2FF0..2FFB	12			N1680		Project Sub-Division Proposal on Scheme of Ideograph Description Sequence, 1997-12-18
3.0	U+2FF0..2FFB	12			N1782		Clause X Ideographic Description Sequence (IDS) – IRG N575, 1998-05-06
3.0	U+2FF0..2FFB	12		L2/98-158			Aliprand, Joan; Winkler, Arnold (1998-05-26), "SC2 SC2 Action re Ideographic Description Sequences", Draft Minutes – UTC #76 & NCITS Subgroup L2 #173 joint meeting, Tredyffrin, Pennsylvania, April 20-22, 1998
3.0	U+2FF0..2FFB	12			N1842		Proposed text for a Draft for amendment 28 - Ideographic Description Sequences, 1998-06-03
3.0	U+2FF0..2FFB	12		L2/98-286	N1703		Umamaheswaran, V. S.; Ksar, Mike (1998-07-02), "9.5", Unconfirmed Meeting Minutes, WG 2 Meeting #34, Redmond, WA, USA; 1998-03-16--20, "The original proposal was to use character composition. It has changed from being composition to description over its three year development."
3.0	U+2FF0..2FFB	12		L2/98-317	N1892 (pdf, doc)		Combined CD registration and consideration ballot on WD for 10646-1/Amd. 28, AMENDMENT 28: Ideographic description characters, 1998-10-22
3.0	U+2FF0..2FFB	12		L2/99-010	N1903 (pdf, html, doc)		Umamaheswaran, V. S. (1998-12-30), "10.3", Minutes of WG 2 meeting 35, London, U.K.; 1998-09-21--25
3.0	U+2FF0..2FFB	12		L2/99-072.1	N1971		Irish Comments on SC 2 N 3186, 1999-01-19
3.0	U+2FF0..2FFB	12		L2/99-072	N1970 (html, doc)		Summary of Voting on SC 2 N 3186, PDAM ballot on WD for 10646-1/Amd. 28: Ideographic description characters, 1999-02-05
3.0	U+2FF0..2FFB	12			N2023		Paterson, Bruce (1999-04-06), FPDAM 28 Text - Ideographic Description Characters
3.0	U+2FF0..2FFB	12		L2/99-120			Text for FPDAM ballot of ISO/IEC 10646, Amd. 28 - Ideographic description characters, 1999-04-07
3.0	U+2FF0..2FFB	12	UTC/1999-014				Jenkins, John (1999-06-01), Recursion depth limit for IDC's
3.0	U+2FF0..2FFB	12	UTC/1999-015				Whistler, Ken (1999-06-01), Re: Brief note on length of ideograph descriptions
3.0	U+2FF0..2FFB	12	UTC/1999-020				Jenkins, John (1999-06-04), Diagram and language [for Ideograph Description Sequences]
3.0	U+2FF0..2FFB	12		L2/99-176R			Moore, Lisa (1999-11-04), "Recursion Limit for Ideographic Description Characters", Minutes from the joint UTC/L2 meeting in Seattle, June 8-10, 1999
3.0	U+2FF0..2FFB	12		L2/99-232	N2003		Umamaheswaran, V. S. (1999-08-03), "6.1.2 PDAM28 - Ideographic Description Characters", Minutes of WG 2 meeting 36, Fukuoka, Japan, 1999-03-09--15
3.0	U+2FF0..2FFB	12		L2/99-253	N2067		Summary of Voting on SC 2 N 3312, ISO 10646-1/FPDAM 28 - Ideographic description characters, 1999-08-19
3.0	U+2FF0..2FFB	12		L2/99-301	N2123		Disposition of Comments Report on SC 2 N 3312, ISO/IEC 10646-1/FPDAM 28, AMENDMENT 28: Ideographic description characters, 1999-09-20
3.0	U+2FF0..2FFB	12		L2/99-302	N2124		Paterson, Bruce (1999-09-24), Revised Text for FDAM ballot of ISO/IEC 10646-1/FDAM 28, AMENDMENT 28: Ideographic description characters
3.0	U+2FF0..2FFB	12		L2/00-010	N2103		Umamaheswaran, V. S. (2000-01-05), "6.4.3", Minutes of WG 2 meeting 37, Copenhagen, Denmark: 1999-09-13—16
3.0	U+2FF0..2FFB	12		L2/00-045			Summary of FDAM voting: ISO 10646 Amd. 28: Ideographic description characters, 2000-01-31
3.0	U+2FF0..2FFB	12		L2/02-221	N2480		Cook, Richard (2002-05-18), Proposal to add Ideographic Description Characters (IDC) to the UCS
3.0	U+2FF0..2FFB	12		L2/02-436	N2534	N955	IRG Radical Classification, 2002-11-21
3.0	U+2FF0..2FFB	12		L2/12-087			Proposed Changes to ISO/IEC 10646 Annex I, Ideographic Description Characters, 2012-02-09
3.0	U+2FF0..2FFB	12		L2/12-007			Moore, Lisa (2012-02-14), "Consensus 130-C13", UTC #130 / L2 #227 Minutes, "Submit L2/12-087 on extensions to ideographic description sequences to WG2."
3.0	U+2FF0..2FFB	12		L2/15-065			Jenkins, John (2015-02-02), Proposal to Add IDS Links to Online Unihan Database
3.0	U+2FF0..2FFB	12		L2/15-070			Davis, Mark (2015-02-03), IDS in Unihan
3.0	U+2FF0..2FFB	12		L2/15-313			Lunde, Ken (2015-11-03), Request for IDS Data
15.1	U+2FFC..2FFF	4		L2/17-386		N2273R	Yang, Tao; Chan, Eiso; Wang, Yifan (2017-10-13), Submission of 3 IDCes
15.1	U+2FFC..2FFF	4		L2/17-379			Lunde, Ken (2017-10-20), "Proposed Ideographic Description Characters (IDCs)", IRG #49 Liaison Report
15.1	U+2FFC..2FFF	4		L2/18-012			Yang, Tao; Chan, Eiso; Wang, Yifan (2018-01-05), Proposal of Four IDCs
15.1	U+2FFC..2FFF	4		L2/18-168			Anderson, Deborah; Whistler, Ken; Pournader, Roozbeh; Moore, Lisa; Liang, Hai; Chapman, Chris; Cook, Richard (2018-04-28), "22. IDCs", Recommendations to UTC #155 April-May 2018 on Script Proposals
15.1	U+2FFC..2FFF	4		L2/21-118R		N2492	Lunde, Ken; Jenkins, John H. (2021-08-11), Preliminary proposal to add a new provisional kIDS property (Unihan)
15.1	U+2FFC..2FFF	4		L2/22-136			West, Andrew (2022-07-08), Feedback on Proposals to Encode New Ideographic Description Characters
15.1	U+2FFC..2FFF	4		L2/22-191		N2572	Lunde, Ken; Jenkins, John; West, Andrew (2022-08-24), Proposal to encode five new Ideographic Description Characters
15.1	U+2FFC..2FFF	4		L2/22-227			SAT Feedback to "Preliminary proposal to add a new provisional kIDS property (Unihan)" (IRGN2492) and "Proposal to encode five new Ideographic Description Characters" (IRGN2572), 2022-08-29
15.1	U+2FFC..2FFF	4		L2/22-228			Fan, Ming (2022-09-02), Feedback on IRGN2572 "Proposal to encode 5 new ideograph description characters"
15.1	U+2FFC..2FFF	4		L2/22-247			Lunde, Ken (2022-11-01), "29", CJK & Unihan Group Recommendations for UTC #173 Meeting
15.1	U+2FFC..2FFF	4		L2/22-241			Constable, Peter (2022-11-09), "E.1 29", Approved Minutes of UTC Meeting 173

== See also ==
- Chinese character description languages
- Specials (Unicode block)
