= Bègles =

- Commune
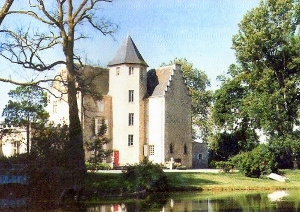
- Château de Francs

- Coat of arms
- Location of Bègles
- Location within France Location within Nouvelle-Aquitaine
- Coordinates: 44°48′31″N 0°32′52″W
- Country: France
- Region: Nouvelle-Aquitaine
- Department: Gironde
- Arrondissement: Bordeaux
- Canton: Talence and Villenave-d'Ornon
- Intercommunality: Bordeaux Métropole

Government
  - Mayor (2020–2026): Clement Rossignol-Puech
- Area^{1}: 9.96 km^{2} (3.85 sq mi)
- Elevation: 8 m (26 ft)
- Highest elevation: 18 m (59 ft)
- Lowest elevation: 3 m (9.8 ft)
- Population (2023): 31,831
  - Density: 3,200/km^{2} (8,280/sq mi)
- Time zone: UTC+01:00 (CET)
  - Summer (DST): UTC+02:00 (CEST)
- INSEE/Postal code: 33039 /33130
- ^{1} French Land Register data, which excludes lakes, ponds, glaciers > 1 km^{2} (0.386 sq mi or 247 acres) and river estuaries.

Bègles (French: [bɛɡl]; Gascon: Begla) is a commune in the Gironde department in southwestern France.

It is a suburb of the city of Bordeaux and is adjacent to it on the south. Bègles station has rail connections to Langon and Bordeaux.

== History ==
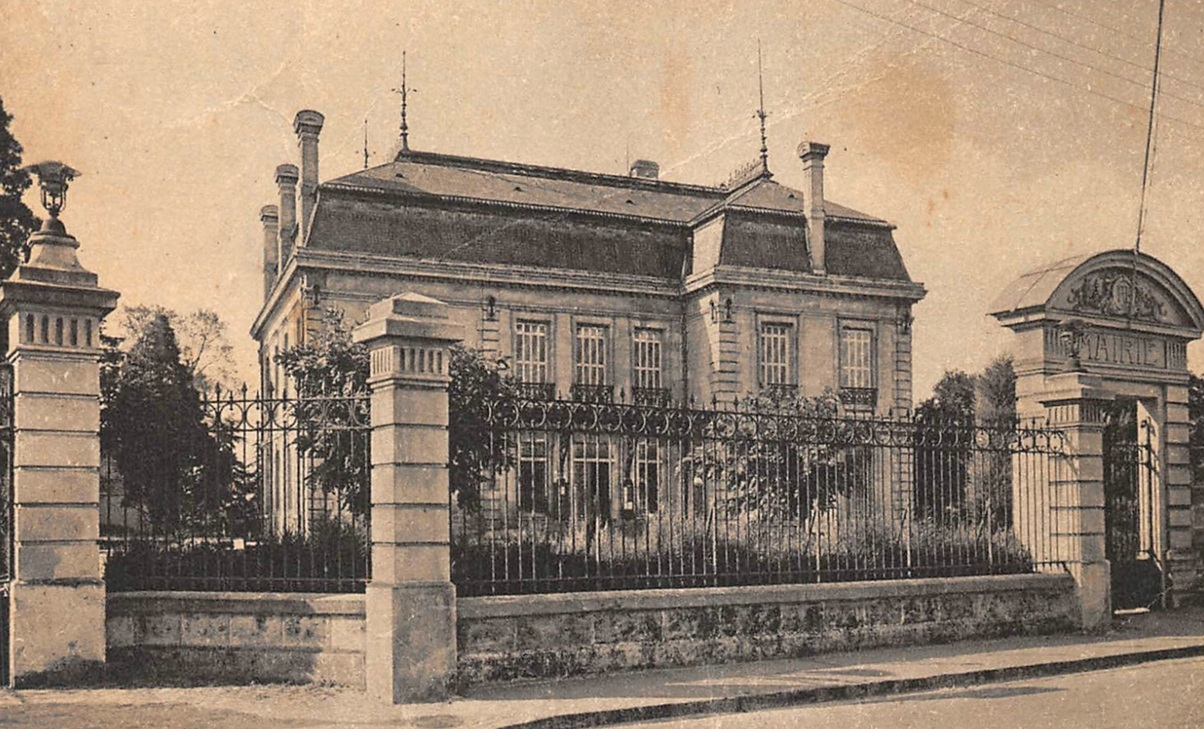
The Hôtel de Ville

The Hôtel de Ville was built as a private residence in 1862.

== Population ==
Historical population

Year	Pop.	±% p.a.
1793	2,115	—
1800	1,526	−4.56%
1806	1,903	+3.75%
1821	2,050	+0.50%
1831	2,322	+1.25%
1836	2,518	+1.63%
1841	2,592	+0.58%
1846	2,745	+1.15%
1851	2,844	+0.71%
1856	3,286	+2.93%
1861	4,005	+4.04%
1866	4,764	+3.53%
1872	5,547	+2.57%
1876	6,202	+2.83%
1881	7,238	+3.14%
1886	8,919	+4.27%
1891	10,535	+3.39%
1896	10,372	−0.31%
1901	12,104	+3.14%

Year	Pop.	±% p.a.
1906	12,588	+0.79%
1911	14,055	+2.23%
1921	16,590	+1.67%
1926	18,349	+2.04%
1931	21,582	+3.30%
1936	20,989	−0.56%
1946	22,590	+0.74%
1954	23,176	+0.32%
1962	24,388	+0.64%
1968	27,330	+1.92%
1975	25,680	−0.89%
1982	23,318	−1.37%
1990	22,604	−0.39%
1999	22,475	−0.06%
2007	24,914	+1.30%
2012	25,380	+0.37%
2017	28,601	+2.42%
2023	31,831	+1.80%

Source: EHESS and INSEE (1968–2023)

== Personalities ==
Bègles was the birthplace of:

- Marie Bell (1900–1985), actress
- Sandrine Cantoreggi (born 1969), violinist
- Lilly Daché (1898–1989), milliner and fashion designer
- Jacques Dufilho (1914–2005), actor
- Philippe Galera (born 1967), retired professional footballer

== International relations ==
Bègles is twinned with:

- Collado Villalba, Spain
- Suhl, Germany
- Bray, Ireland

== See also ==
- Communes of the Gironde department
