= 2012 European Athletics Championships – Men's decathlon =

Men's decathlon at the European Athletics Championships

The men's decathlon at the 2012 European Athletics Championships was held at the Helsinki Olympic Stadium on 27 and 28 June.

== Medalists ==
Gold	Pascal Behrenbruch; Germany
Silver	Oleksiy Kasyanov; Ukraine
Bronze	Ilya Shkurenyov; Russia

== Records ==
Standing records prior to the 2012 European Athletics Championships
World record	Ashton Eaton (USA)	9039	Eugene, United States	23 June 2012
European record	Roman Šebrle (CZE)	9026	Götzis, Austria	27 May 2001
Championship record	Daley Thompson (GBR)	8811	Stuttgart, West Germany	28 August 1986
World Leading	Ashton Eaton (USA)	9039	Eugene, United States	23 June 2012
European Leading	Hans Van Alphen (BEL)	8519	Götzis, Austria	27 May 2012
Broken records during the 2012 European Athletics Championships
European Leading	Pascal Behrenbruch (GER)	8558	Helsinki, Finland	28 June 2012

== Schedule ==
Date	Time	Round
27 June 2012	9:10	100 metres
27 June 2012	10:35	Long jump
27 June 2012	12:15	Shot put
27 June 2012	13:40	High jump
27 June 2012	19:10	400 metres
28 June 2012	9:00	110 metres hurdles
28 June 2012	9:45	Discus throw
28 June 2012	12:40	Pole vault
28 June 2012	16:25	Javelin throw
28 June 2012	19:30	1500 metres
28 June 2012		Final standings

== Results ==
=== 100 metres ===
Wind: Heat 1: +0.8 m/s, Heat 2: +0.7 m/s, Heat 3: +0.8 m/s, Heat 4: -0.3 m/s

Rank	Heat	Lane	Name	Nationality	Time	Notes	Points
1	1	3	Oleksiy Kasyanov	Ukraine	10.57		959
2	4	6	Dominik Distelberger	Austria	10.80	SB	906
3	1	6	Mihail Dudaš	Serbia	10.81		903
4	4	1	Pelle Rietveld	Netherlands	10.85	SB	894
5	3	3	Pascal Behrenbruch	Germany	10.93	SB	876
5	3	7	Cédric Nolf	Belgium	10.93	PB	876
7	4	5	Adam Helcelet	Czech Republic	10.96		870
8	3	4	Ilya Shkurenyov	Russia	10.98	PB	865
9	2	3	Björn Barrefors	Sweden	11.02	PB	856
9	4	2	Petter Olson	Sweden	11.02		856
11	4	7	Mathias Brugger	Germany	11.04		852
12	3	2	Ashley Bryant	Great Britain	11.08		843
12	4	4	Norman Müller	Germany	11.08		843
14	2	5	Kevin Mayer	France	11.10	PB	838
15	2	6	Einar Daði Lárusson	Iceland	11.11	PB	836
16	3	1	Igor Šarčević	Serbia	11.15		827
17	2	7	Gaël Quérin	France	11.17	SB	823
17	4	3	Artem Lukyanenko	Russia	11.17		823
19	2	2	Sami Itani	Finland	11.19	PB	819
19	2	4	Roman Šebrle	Czech Republic	11.19	SB	819
19	3	6	Florian Geffrouais	France	11.19		819
22	3	5	Jonas Fringeli	Switzerland	11.22		812
23	1	4	Vasiliy Kharlamov	Russia	11.27	SB	801
24	1	5	Mikalai Shubianok	Belarus	11.34	SB	786
25	1	2	Tarmo Riitmuru	Estonia	11.50		753
26	1	7	Marcus Nilsson	Sweden	11.53		746

=== Long jump ===
Rank	Group	Name	Nationality	#1	#2	#3	Result	Notes	Points
1	B	Gaël Quérin	France	7.17	7.18	7.56	7.56	PB	950
2	A	Oleksiy Kasyanov	Ukraine	7.14	7.39	7.49	7.49		932
3	B	Roman Šebrle	Czech Republic	7.32	7.43	7.21	7.43	SB	918
4	A	Mihail Dudaš	Serbia	7.05	7.36	7.21	7.36		900
5	B	Einar Daði Lárusson	Iceland	6.96	7.33	5.61	7.33		893
6	B	Ilya Shkurenyov	Russia	7.10	7.32	7.28	7.32		891
7	B	Adam Helcelet	Czech Republic	7.12	7.21	7.30	7.30		886
8	B	Norman Müller	Germany	7.07	7.15	7.24	7.24		871
9	B	Vasiliy Kharlamov	Russia	7.02	x	7.22	7.22		866
10	B	Björn Barrefors	Sweden	6.75	x	7.17	7.17		854
11	B	Artem Lukyanenko	Russia	6.69	7.16	6.69	7.16		852
12	A	Pascal Behrenbruch	Germany	6.90	6.96	7.15	7.15	SB	850
13	A	Dominik Distelberger	Austria	7.14	x	7.00	7.14	SB	847
14	B	Cédric Nolf	Belgium	6.53	7.13	x	7.13		845
15	B	Ashley Bryant	Great Britain	6.96	7.12	7.06	7.12		842
16	A	Mikalai Shubianok	Belarus	6.82	6.89	7.08	7.08	SB	833
17	A	Jonas Fringeli	Switzerland	7.04	x	x	7.04	PB	823
18	A	Petter Olson	Sweden	6.88	7.04	x	7.04	SB	823
19	A	Pelle Rietveld	Netherlands	7.02	–	–	7.02		818
20	A	Sami Itani	Finland	6.60	6.84	6.72	6.84		776
21	B	Mathias Brugger	Germany	x	x	6.81	6.81		769
22	A	Tarmo Riitmuru	Estonia	6.80	6.59	6.78	6.80		767
23	A	Marcus Nilsson	Sweden	6.31	6.60	x	6.60		720
24	A	Igor Šarčević	Serbia	6.50	6.54	x	6.54		707
	A	Florian Geffrouais	France	x	x	x	NM		0
	B	Kevin Mayer	France	x	x	x	NM		0

=== Shot put ===
Rank	Group	Name	Nationality	#1	#2	#3	Result	Notes	Points
1	B	Pascal Behrenbruch	Germany	16.89	–	–	16.89	PB	906
2	B	Mikalai Shubianok	Belarus	x	14.92	15.37	15.37	PB	812
3	B	Norman Müller	Germany	13.31	14.20	14.88	14.88	SB	782
4	B	Igor Šarčević	Serbia	14.86	14.59	x	14.86	PB	781
5	B	Roman Šebrle	Czech Republic	14.27	x	14.65	14.65		768
6	B	Vasiliy Kharlamov	Russia	x	14.55	x	14.55		762
7	A	Oleksiy Kasyanov	Ukraine	14.00	13.74	14.38	14.38		752
8	B	Florian Geffrouais	France	13.93	x	14.31	14.31		747
9	B	Artem Lukyanenko	Russia	14.18	x	14.02	14.18		739
10	B	Sami Itani	Finland	13.68	13.27	14.07	14.07		733
11	B	Adam Helcelet	Czech Republic	12.12	x	13.99	13.99		728
12	A	Mathias Brugger	Germany	13.58	x	13.95	13.95	SB	725
13	A	Tarmo Riitmuru	Estonia	13.75	13.69	x	13.75	PB	713
14	A	Einar Daði Lárusson	Iceland	12.16	12.44	13.65	13.65	PB	707
15	A	Mihail Dudaš	Serbia	12.66	13.64	x	13.64		706
16	B	Marcus Nilsson	Sweden	13.24	x	13.63	13.63		706
17	A	Petter Olson	Sweden	13.40	x	12.79	13.40		692
18	A	Jonas Fringeli	Switzerland	13.06	13.28	x	13.28	PB	684
19	A	Ilya Shkurenyov	Russia	12.44	12.77	13.16	13.16		677
20	A	Ashley Bryant	Great Britain	x	12.33	13.08	13.08		672
21	A	Cédric Nolf	Belgium	12.13	13.07	12.35	13.07		672
22	A	Björn Barrefors	Sweden	12.67	13.06	x	13.06		671
23	A	Gaël Quérin	France	12.28	13.05	12.40	13.05	SB	670
24	B	Kevin Mayer	France	12.25	–	–	12.25		622
25	A	Dominik Distelberger	Austria	11.12	x	11.22	11.22		559
	B	Pelle Rietveld	Netherlands				DNS		DNF

=== High jump ===
Rank	Group	Name	Nationality	1.73	1.76	1.79	1.82	1.85	1.88	1.91	1.94	1.97	2.00	2.03	2.06	2.09	Result	Notes	Points
1	B	Ilya Shkurenyov	Russia	–	–	–	–	–	–	xo	o	o	xo	o	xxo	xxx	2.06	=PB	859
2	B	Adam Helcelet	Czech Republic	–	–	–	–	–	–	o	–	o	xo	xxo	xxx		2.03		831
3	B	Sami Itani	Finland	–	–	–	–	–	–	o	–	o	o	xxx			2.00		803
3	B	Einar Daði Lárusson	Iceland	–	–	–	–	–	o	–	o	o	o	xxx			2.00		803
3	B	Roman Šebrle	Czech Republic	–	–	–	–	–	–	–	o	–	o	xxx			2.00		803
3	B	Mikalai Shubianok	Belarus	–	–	–	–	–	–	o	–	o	o	xxx			2.00		803
7	A	Oleksiy Kasyanov	Ukraine	–	–	–	–	–	–	o	o	o	xo	xxx			2.00		803
8	A	Norman Müller	Germany	–	–	–	–	–	–	xo	–	xxo	xo	xxx			2.00	=SB	803
9	B	Pascal Behrenbruch	Germany	–	–	–	–	o	–	o	o	o	xxx				1.97		776
9	A	Gaël Quérin	France	–	–	–	–	o	o	o	o	o	xxx				1.97		776
11	A	Jonas Fringeli	Switzerland	–	–	–	–	o	o	xo	o	o	xxx				1.97		776
12	A	Mihail Dudaš	Serbia	–	–	–	–	xo	–	xo	xo	o	xxx				1.97		776
13	A	Tarmo Riitmuru	Estonia	–	–	–	–	–	o	o	o	xo	xxx				1.97		776
14	B	Mathias Brugger	Germany	–	–	–	–	–	–	o	–	xxo	xxx				1.97		776
14	B	Artem Lukyanenko	Russia	–	–	–	–	–	–	o	o	xxo	xxx				1.97		776
16	B	Björn Barrefors	Sweden	–	–	–	–	–	–	o	xxo	xxo	xxx				1.97		776
17	A	Petter Olson	Sweden	–	–	–	o	o	o	o	o	xxx					1.94	SB	749
18	A	Vasiliy Kharlamov	Russia	–	–	–	xo	o	xo	xxo	xxx						1.91		723
19	A	Cédric Nolf	Belgium	–	o	–	o	o	o	xxx							1.88	=SB	696
19	B	Marcus Nilsson	Sweden	–	–	o	–	o	o	xxx							1.88		696
21	A	Dominik Distelberger	Austria	–	o	o	o	o	xo	xxx							1.88	=SB	696
22	A	Ashley Bryant	Great Britain	o	o	o	xo	xxo	o	xxx							1.88	SB	696
	A	Florian Geffrouais	France														DNS		
	A	Pelle Rietveld	Netherlands														DNS		
	B	Kevin Mayer	France														DNS		
	B	Igor Šarčević	Serbia														DNS		

=== 400 metres ===
Rank	Heat	Lane	Name	Nationality	Time	Notes	Points
1	1	5	Mihail Dudaš	Serbia	48.02		908
2	1	2	Oleksiy Kasyanov	Ukraine	48.07		906
3	3	1	Gaël Quérin	France	48.20	SB	899
4	2	4	Dominik Distelberger	Austria	48.52	SB	884
5	3	8	Pascal Behrenbruch	Germany	48.54	SB	883
6	2	6	Norman Müller	Germany	48.74	SB	874
7	3	4	Jonas Fringeli	Switzerland	48.75		873
8	3	6	Mathias Brugger	Germany	48.84		869
9	3	7	Petter Olson	Sweden	49.01		861
10	3	2	Einar Daði Lárusson	Iceland	49.07	SB	858
11	3	5	Ashley Bryant	Great Britain	49.29		848
12	2	7	Artem Lukyanenko	Russia	49.42	SB	842
13	2	3	Cédric Nolf	Belgium	49.74	PB	827
14	1	4	Roman Šebrle	Czech Republic	49.87	SB	821
15	2	5	Björn Barrefors	Sweden	49.90	SB	819
16	2	1	Ilya Shkurenyov	Russia	49.92	SB	818
17	2	8	Marcus Nilsson	Sweden	49.94		817
18	3	3	Adam Helcelet	Czech Republic	49.98		816
19	1	3	Sami Itani	Finland	50.01	PB	814
20	1	7	Mikalai Shubianok	Belarus	50.27	SB	802
21	1	6	Tarmo Riitmuru	Estonia	51.51		746
	2	2	Vasiliy Kharlamov	Russia	DNS		

=== 110 metres hurdles ===
Wind:
Heat 1: -0.5 m/s, Heat 2: -0.5 m/s, Heat 3: +0.2 m/s

Rank	Heat	Lane	Name	Nationality	Time	Notes	Points
1	3	7	Pascal Behrenbruch	Germany	14.16	SB	954
2	3	1	Oleksiy Kasyanov	Ukraine	14.23		945
3	3	3	Adam Helcelet	Czech Republic	14.24		944
3	3	5	Ilya Shkurenyov	Russia	14.24	PB	944
5	2	6	Gaël Quérin	France	14.37	SB	927
6	2	8	Roman Šebrle	Czech Republic	14.45	SB	917
7	1	7	Mikalai Shubianok	Belarus	14.57	SB	902
8	2	5	Dominik Distelberger	Austria	14.61	SB	897
9	2	4	Petter Olson	Sweden	14.63		895
10	3	4	Jonas Fringeli	Switzerland	14.64		894
11	3	6	Artem Lukyanenko	Russia	14.66		891
12	2	3	Einar Daði Lárusson	Iceland	14.72		884
13	3	2	Ashley Bryant	Great Britain	14.74		881
14	1	2	Tarmo Riitmuru	Estonia	14.78		876
14	1	5	Mihail Dudaš	Serbia	14.78	PB	876
16	2	1	Cédric Nolf	Belgium	14.79		875
17	1	3	Norman Müller	Germany	14.83	SB	870
17	3	8	Björn Barrefors	Sweden	14.83		870
19	2	7	Sami Itani	Finland	14.89		863
20	2	2	Mathias Brugger	Germany	15.07		841
21	1	6	Marcus Nilsson	Sweden	16.95		629
	1	4	Vasiliy Kharlamov	Russia	DNS		

=== Discus throw ===
Rank	Group	Name	Nationality	#1	#2	#3	Result	Notes	Points
1	B	Pascal Behrenbruch	Germany	37.63	46.00	48.24	48.24	PB	834
2	B	Oleksiy Kasyanov	Ukraine	47.75	47.40	x	47.75		824
3	B	Ilya Shkurenyov	Russia	42.63	x	44.82	44.82	PB	763
4	B	Roman Šebrle	Czech Republic	35.06	44.05	43.90	44.05		747
5	A	Mikalai Shubianok	Belarus	43.80	x	x	43.80		742
6	A	Mihail Dudaš	Serbia	x	41.32	43.55	43.55		737
7	A	Tarmo Riitmuru	Estonia	x	39.90	42.75	42.75		721
8	A	Mathias Brugger	Germany	40.67	41.99	x	41.99		705
9	A	Sami Itani	Finland	40.23	41.20	x	41.20		689
10	A	Norman Müller	Germany	39.97	39.46	41.12	41.12	SB	687
11	A	Marcus Nilsson	Sweden	40.89	40.93	39.48	40.93		683
12	B	Jonas Fringeli	Switzerland	x	x	40.80	40.80	SB	681
13	B	Gaël Quérin	France	x	34.38	40.32	40.32		671
14	B	Ashley Bryant	Great Britain	38.30	38.37	39.94	39.94		663
15	B	Björn Barrefors	Sweden	39.80	38.39	x	39.80		660
16	B	Petter Olson	Sweden	38.82	x	39.41	39.41		653
17	B	Adam Helcelet	Czech Republic	38.82	x	39.12	39.12		647
18	B	Artem Lukyanenko	Russia	37.07	38.49	x	38.49		634
19	A	Dominik Distelberger	Austria	x	28.62	38.29	38.29		630
20	A	Cédric Nolf	Belgium	37.90	36.79	37.75	37.90		622
21	A	Einar Daði Lárusson	Iceland	35.95	x	x	35.95		583

=== Pole vault ===
Rank	Group	Name	Nationality	3.90	4.10	4.20	4.30	4.40	4.50	4.60	4.70	4.80	4.90	5.00	5.10	5.20	5.30	Result	Notes	Points
1	B	Ilya Shkurenyov	Russia	–	–	–	–	o	–	xo	o	o	o	o	xo	o	xxx	5.20	=PB	972
2	A	Tarmo Riitmuru	Estonia	–	–	–	–	–	–	o	–	o	xo	xo	xxx			5.00		910
2	B	Pascal Behrenbruch	Germany	–	–	–	–	o	–	o	o	o	xo	xxo	xxx			5.00	PB	910
2	B	Gaël Quérin	France	–	–	–	–	–	–	xo	–	o	o	xxo	xxx			5.00	PB	910
5	B	Roman Šebrle	Czech Republic	–	–	–	–	o	–	o	xxo	xo	xo	–				4.90	SB	880
5	B	Björn Barrefors	Sweden	–	–	–	–	o	–	o	o	xo	xxo	xxx				4.90		880
7	B	Petter Olson	Sweden	–	–	–	–	o	–	o	o	o	xxx					4.80		849
7	A	Mihail Dudaš	Serbia	–	–	–	–	–	o	–	xxo	o	xxx					4.80		849
7	A	Oleksiy Kasyanov	Ukraine	–	–	–	–	–	xo	–	o	xo	xxx					4.80		849
7	B	Adam Helcelet	Czech Republic	–	–	–	o	–	xo	o	xo	xo	xxx					4.80		849
7	B	Norman Müller	Germany	–	–	–	–	–	xo	–	xxo	xxo	xxx					4.80		849
12	A	Mikalai Shubianok	Belarus	–	–	–	–	o	o	o	o	xxx						4.70	=PB	819
12	A	Dominik Distelberger	Austria	–	–	–	–	o	–	o	xxo	xxx						4.70		819
14	A	Einar Daði Lárusson	Iceland	–	–	–	xo	o	o	o	xxx							4.60		790
14	B	Cédric Nolf	Belgium	–	–	–	–	–	xo	o	xxx							4.60		790
14	B	Jonas Fringeli	Switzerland	–	–	–	o	xo	xxo	o	xxx							4.60		790
17	A	Ashley Bryant	Great Britain	xo	xo	o	xo	xo	o	xxx								4.50		760
18	A	Sami Itani	Finland	–	o	–	xo	xo	xxx									4.40	SB	731
18	B	Marcus Nilsson	Sweden	–	xxo	–	o	xxo	–									4.40		731
	A	Artem Lukyanenko	Russia															DNS		
	A	Vasiliy Kharlamov	Russia															DNS		
	A	Mathias Brugger	Germany															DNS		

=== Javelin throw ===
Rank	Group	Name	Nationality	#1	#2	#3	Result	Notes	Points
1	B	Pascal Behrenbruch	Germany	67.45	64.45	x	67.45	SB	851
2	A	Ashley Bryant	Great Britain	66.71	x	61.12	66.71		839
3	B	Roman Šebrle	Czech Republic	60.98	x	61.78	61.78		765
4	B	Adam Helcelet	Czech Republic	61.66	57.24	59.47	61.66		763
5	A	Mihail Dudaš	Serbia	59.12	59.38	59.98	59.98	PB	738
6	A	Mikalai Shubianok	Belarus	57.24	53.80	58.51	58.51	SB	715
7	B	Ilya Shkurenyov	Russia	52.46	56.70	53.63	56.70	SB	688
8	A	Sami Itani	Finland	51.51	56.65	54.64	56.65	SB	688
9	A	Petter Olson	Sweden	56.26	52.73	–	56.26		682
10	A	Dominik Distelberger	Austria	55.72	53.32	54.11	55.72		674
11	B	Norman Müller	Germany	55.41	51.02	52.60	55.41		669
12	B	Tarmo Riitmuru	Estonia	54.28	x	54.81	54.81		660
13	A	Marcus Nilsson	Sweden	50.41	54.14	50.24	54.14		650
14	B	Gaël Quérin	France	50.97	53.60	49.06	53.60		642
15	B	Oleksiy Kasyanov	Ukraine	52.36	52.37	51.65	52.37		624
16	A	Einar Daði Lárusson	Iceland	51.75	44.42	46.87	51.75		615
17	A	Jonas Fringeli	Switzerland	51.33	47.80	x	51.33		608
18	B	Björn Barrefors	Sweden	45.53	49.03	x	49.03		574
	A	Cédric Nolf	Belgium				DNS		0

=== 1500 metres ===
Rank	Order	Name	Nationality	Result	Notes	Points
1	1	Gaël Quérin	France	4:17.29		830
2	12	Marcus Nilsson	Sweden	4:23.79		786
3	9	Jonas Fringeli	Switzerland	4:24.93		778
4	11	Mihail Dudaš	Serbia	4:27.54		761
5	17	Norman Müller	Germany	4:28.47	SB	755
6	15	Ilya Shkurenyov	Russia	4:30.41	PB	742
7	4	Mikalai Shubianok	Belarus	4:31.56	SB	734
8	5	Oleksiy Kasyanov	Ukraine	4:32.66		727
9	7	Tarmo Riitmuru	Estonia	4:33.50		722
10	19	Pascal Behrenbruch	Germany	4:34.02	SB	718
11	16	Petter Olson	Sweden	4:35.13		711
12	8	Dominik Distelberger	Austria	4:37.05		699
13	3	Einar Daði Lárusson	Iceland	4:39.38		684
14	18	Adam Helcelet	Czech Republic	4:42.55	SB	664
15	6	Ashley Bryant	Great Britain	4:49.16		624
16	14	Roman Šebrle	Czech Republic	4:50.74		614
17	13	Sami Itani	Finland	4:53.28	SB	599
18	2	Björn Barrefors	Sweden	4:56.97		577
	10	Cédric Nolf	Belgium	DNS		

=== Final standings ===
Rank	Name	Nationality	Points	Notes
1st place, gold medalist(s)	Pascal Behrenbruch	Germany	8558	EL
2nd place, silver medalist(s)	Oleksiy Kasyanov	Ukraine	8321	
3rd place, bronze medalist(s)	Ilya Shkurenyov	Russia	8219	PB
4	Mihail Dudaš	Serbia	8154	SB
5	Gaël Quérin	France	8098	PB
6	Roman Šebrle	Czech Republic	8052	
7	Norman Müller	Germany	8003	
8	Adam Helcelet	Czech Republic	7998	
9	Mikalai Shubianok	Belarus	7948	SB
10	Petter Olson	Sweden	7771	
11	Jonas Fringeli	Switzerland	7719	
12	Ashley Bryant	Great Britain	7668	PB
13	Einar Daði Lárusson	Iceland	7653	
14	Tarmo Riitmuru	Estonia	7644	
15	Dominik Distelberger	Austria	7611	SB
16	Björn Barrefors	Sweden	7537	
17	Sami Itani	Finland	7515	SB
18	Marcus Nilsson	Sweden	7164	
	Cédric Nolf	Belgium	DNF	
	Artem Lukyanenko	Russia	DNF	
	Mathias Brugger	Germany	DNF	
	Vasiliy Kharlamov	Russia	DNF	
	Florian Geffrouais	France	DNF	
	Pelle Rietveld	Netherlands	DNF	
	Kevin Mayer	France	DNF	
	Igor Šarčević	Serbia	DNF	
