= Athletics at the 2011 Summer Universiade – Men's decathlon =

The men's decathlon event at the 2011 Summer Universiade was held on 17–18 August.

== Medalists ==
Gold	Silver	Bronze
Vasiliy Kharlamov; Russia	Gaël Quérin; France	Mikhail Logvinenko; Russia

== Results ==
=== 100 metres ===
Wind:
Heat 1: +0.1 m/s, Heat 2: +0.7 m/s, Heat 3: +0.1 m/s

Rank	Heat	Name	Nationality	Time	Points	Notes
1	3	Ashley Bryant	Great Britain	11.08	843	
2	2	Cédric Nolf	Belgium	11.09	841	PB
3	2	Gaël Quérin	France	11.12	834	PB
4	1	Hashim al-Sharfa	Saudi Arabia	11.16	825	
5	3	Thomas Barrineau	Finland	11.18	821	
6	2	Mikhail Logvinenko	Russia	11.23	810	PB
7	2	Vasiliy Kharlamov	Russia	11.25	806	PB
8	2	Hadi Sepehrzad	Iran	11.28	799	F1
9	2	Jérémy Solot	Belgium	11.28	799	
10	3	Tiago Marto	Portugal	11.29	797	
11	3	Simon Walter	Switzerland	11.31	793	
12	3	Jonay Jordan	Spain	11.33	789	
13	2	Sami Itani	Finland	11.34	786	
14	1	Stephen Cain	Australia	11.36	782	PB
14	3	Christopher Crossley	Canada	11.36	782	
16	3	Florian Geffrouais	France	11.37	780	
17	1	Harald Boe	Norway	11.58	736	PB
18	1	Mikalai Shubianok	Belarus	11.60	732	
19	1	Sun Gang	China	11.63	725	

=== Long jump ===
Rank	Group	Athlete	Nationality	#1	#2	#3	Result	Points	Notes	Overall
1	B	Cédric Nolf	Belgium	x	7.28	7.55	7.55	947	PB	1788
2	B	Ashley Bryant	Great Britain	7.48	x	x	7.48	930	PB	1773
3	B	Gaël Quérin	France	7.31	x	7.44	7.44	920	PB	1754
4	B	Vasiliy Kharlamov	Russia	7.37	7.20	7.27	7.37	903		1709
5	B	Jérémy Solot	Belgium	7.18	7.16	x	7.18	857	=PB	1656
6	B	Mikhail Logvinenko	Russia	6.81	6.87	7.03	7.03	821		1631
7	A	Mikalai Shubianok	Belarus	6.79	7.00	6.95	7.00	814	PB	1546
8	B	Christopher Crossley	Canada	6.96	6.83	x	6.96	804		1586
9	A	Sun Gang	China	6.93	6.89	6.94	6.94	799	PB	1524
10	A	Hashim al-Sharfa	Saudi Arabia	6.88	6.88	x	6.88	785		1610
11	B	Simon Walter	Switzerland	6.63	x	6.87	6.87	783		1576
12	A	Tiago Marto	Portugal	6.53	6.82	6.80	6.82	771		1568
13	B	Florian Geffrouais	France	6.08	x	6.79	6.79	764		1544
14	B	Jonay Jordan	Spain	6.68	6.78	x	6.78	762		1551
15	A	Thomas Barrineau	Finland	6.60	6.73	6.77	6.77	760	PB	1581
16	A	Stephen Cain	Australia	x	6.74	6.69	6.74	753		1535
17	A	Sami Itani	Finland	6.47	6.70	6.56	6.70	743		1529
18	A	Hadi Sepehrzad	Iran	6.17	6.40	6.51	6.51	700		1499
19	A	Harald Boe	Norway	5.94	6.08	6.09	6.09	606	PB	1342

=== Shot put ===
Rank	Group	Athlete	Nationality	#1	#2	#3	Result	Points	Notes	Overall
1	A	Hadi Sepehrzad	Iran	15.17	x	x	15.17	800		2299
2	A	Vasiliy Kharlamov	Russia	15.01	x	x	15.01	790		2499
3	A	Florian Geffrouais	France	14.23	x	14.97	14.97	788		2332
4	A	Jérémy Solot	Belgium	13.74	13.70	14.34	14.34	749	PB	2405
5	A	Mikalai Shubianok	Belarus	13.65	x	14.31	14.31	747		2293
6	B	Cédric Nolf	Belgium	12.55	12.36	13.70	13.70	710	PB	2498
7	A	Mikhail Logvinenko	Russia	12.68	13.56	13.62	13.62	705		2336
8	B	Tiago Marto	Portugal	13.37	13.56	x	13.56	701	PB	2269
9	A	Stephen Cain	Australia	13.50	x	x	13.50	701	PB	2269
10	A	Sami Itani	Finland	13.42	13.38	13.31	13.42	693		2222
11	B	Ashley Bryant	Great Britain	13.14	13.32	13.05	13.32	687	SB	2460
12	A	Jonay Jordan	Spain	13.09	13.23	x	13.23	681		2232
13	A	Simon Walter	Switzerland	13.12	12.52	12.49	13.12	675		2251
14	B	Sun Gang	China	12.08	12.84	13.06	13.06	671	PB	2195
15	B	Thomas Barrineau	Finland	11.94	12.79	12.57	12.79	654		2235
16	B	Christopher Crossley	Canada	12.18	12.57	12.72	12.72	650		2236
17	B	Gaël Quérin	France	x	x	12.37	12.37	629		2383
18	B	Hashim al-Sharfa	Saudi Arabia	11.74	10.92	x	11.74	591		2201
19	B	Harald Boe	Norway	11.36	11.37	11.62	11.62	583		1925

=== High jump ===
Rank	Group	Athlete	Nationality	1.68	1.71	1.74	1.77	1.80	1.83	1.86	1.89	1.92	1.95	1.98	2.01	2.04	Result	Points	Notes	Overall
1	A	Sami Itani	Finland	–	–	–	–	–	–	o	–	o	–	o	xo	xxx	2.01	813		3035
2	A	Mikalai Shubianok	Belarus	–	–	–	–	–	–	–	–	–	o	xxo	xxo	xxx	2.01	813	=SB	3106
3	A	Gaël Quérin	France	–	–	–	–	–	–	–	o	o	xo	xo	xxx		1.98	785		3168
3	A	Jérémy Solot	Belgium	–	–	–	–	–	–	–	o	–	xo	xo	xxx		1.98	785	=PB	3190
5	A	Simon Walter	Switzerland	–	–	–	–	–	–	o	–	o	xxo	xo	xxx		1.98	785		3036
6	B	Vasiliy Kharlamov	Russia	–	–	–	–	–	o	o	o	o	o	xxx			1.95	758	SB	3257
6	B	Cédric Nolf	Belgium	–	–	o	–	o	o	o	o	o	o	xxx			1.95	758	PB	3256
8	B	Thomas Barrineau	Finland	–	–	–	–	–	–	o	o	xxo	xo	xxx			1.95	758	PB	2993
9	B	Tiago Marto	Portugal	–	–	–	o	o	o	o	o	xo	xxo	xxx			1.95	758	SB	3027
10	A	Sun Gang	China	–	–	–	–	o	–	xo	xxo	o	xxx				1.92	731		2926
11	A	Mikhail Logvinenko	Russia	–	–	–	–	o	–	xo	o	xo	xxx				1.92	731		3067
12	B	Ashley Bryant	Great Britain	o	–	o	o	o	o	o	xxo	xxx					1.89	705	=PB	3165
13	A	Christopher Crossley	Canada	–	–	–	–	–	o	o	xxx						1.86	679		2915
14	A	Stephen Cain	Australia	–	–	–	–	xo	–	o	–	xxx					1.86	679		2912
15	B	Hashim al-Sharfa	Saudi Arabia	–	o	o	o	o	xxo	xxo	xxx						1.86	679		2880
16	A	Jonay Jordan	Spain	–	o	–	o	–	o	–	xxx						1.83	653		2885
17	B	Harald Boe	Norway	o	xo	xxx											1.71	552	PB	2477
	B	Florian Geffrouais	France	–	–	–	–	–	–	xxx							NM	0		2332
	B	Hadi Sepehrzad	Iran														DNS	0		DNF

=== 400 metres ===
Rank	Heat	Name	Nationality	Time	Points	Notes	Overall
1	1	Gaël Quérin	France	48.54	883		4051
2	1	Ashley Bryant	Great Britain	48.59	881		4046
3	1	Florian Geffrouais	France	48.96	863	SB	3195
4	1	Mikhail Logvinenko	Russia	49.11	856		3923
5	1	Simon Walter	Switzerland	49.21	851		3887
6	1	Thomas Barrineau	Finland	49.25	849		3842
7	2	Vasiliy Kharlamov	Russia	49.76	826		4083
8	2	Jérémy Solot	Belgium	50.25	803	PB	3993
9	2	Jonay Jordan	Spain	50.41	796		3681
10	1	Christopher Crossley	Canada	50.73	781		3696
11	2	Mikalai Shubianok	Belarus	50.79	779	SB	3885
12	2	Stephen Cain	Australia	51.22	759		3671
13	2	Cédric Nolf	Belgium	51.30	756		4012
14	3	Harald Boe	Norway	51.59	743	PB	3220
15	2	Sami Itani	Finland	51.80	734		3769
16	3	Tiago Marto	Portugal	52.21	716	SB	3743
17	3	Sun Gang	China	53.93	642		3568
18	3	Hashim al-Sharfa	Saudi Arabia	DNF	0		2880

=== 110 metres hurdles ===
Wind:
Heat 1: -0.1 m/s, Heat 2: -0.4 m/s, Heat 3: -0.5 m/s

Rank	Lane	Name	Nationality	Time	Points	Notes	Overall
1	3	Mikhail Logvinenko	Russia	14.52	908		4831
2	3	Gaël Quérin	France	14.68	889		4940
3	3	Jonay Jordan	Spain	14.71	885	PB	4566
4	3	Ashley Bryant	Great Britain	14.71	885		4931
5	1	Sami Itani	Finland	14.76	879		4648
6	2	Tiago Marto	Portugal	14.85	868	SB	4611
7	3	Jérémy Solot	Belgium	14.89	863		4856
8	2	Cédric Nolf	Belgium	14.90	862	PB	4874
9	3	Vasiliy Kharlamov	Russia	14.95	856		4939
10	2	Stephen Cain	Australia	15.05	843		4514
11	2	Florian Geffrouais	France	15.07	841		4036
12	2	Simon Walter	Switzerland	15.11	836		4723
13	1	Thomas Barrineau	Finland	15.19	827	PB	4669
14	3	Mikalai Shubianok	Belarus	15.38	804		4689
15	2	Sun Gang	China	15.54	785		4353
16	1	Christopher Crossley	Canada	15.73	763		4459
17	1	Harald Boe	Norway	16.26	704	PB	3924
	1	Hashim al-Sharfa	Saudi Arabia	DNS	0		DNF

=== Discus throw ===
Rank	Group	Athlete	Nationality	#1	#2	#3	Result	Points	Notes	Overall
1	A	Mikhail Logvinenko	Russia	43.97	45.59	46.40	46.40	796	PB	5627
2	A	Vasiliy Kharlamov	Russia	44.43	x	46.03	46.03	788		5727
3	A	Florian Geffrouais	France	43.07	x	x	43.07	727	SB	4763
4	A	Simon Walter	Switzerland	42.67	41.21	41.78	42.67	719		5442
5	A	Sami Itani	Finland	x	x	42.16	42.16	709		5357
6	B	Mikalai Shubianok	Belarus	40.04	x	41.47	41.47	694	SB	5383
7	A	Stephen Cain	Australia	39.24	40.93	41.23	41.23	690		5204
8	B	Ashley Bryant	Great Britain	39.26	40.40	40.46	40.46	674	PB	5605
9	A	Sun Gang	China	x	40.26	39.06	40.26	670		5023
10	B	Tiago Marto	Portugal	38.92	x	40.17	40.17	668	PB	5279
11	A	Cédric Nolf	Belgium	37.71	39.51	39.76	39.76	660		5534
12	B	Christopher Crossley	Canada	39.39	x	39.42	39.42	653	PB	5112
13	B	Gaël Quérin	France	x	39.20	36.89	39.20	648		5588
14	B	Thomas Barrineau	Finland	34.45	35.33	33.86	35.33	570		5239
15	B	Harald Boe	Norway	34.16	34.38	34.46	34.46	553		4477
16	B	Jonay Jordan	Spain	34.33	x	x	34.33	550		5116
	A	Jérémy Solot	Belgium	x	x	x	NM	0		4856

=== Pole vault ===
Rank	Group	Athlete	Nationality	3.70	3.80	3.90	4.00	4.10	4.20	4.30	4.40	4.50	4.60	4.70	4.80	4.90	5.00	5.10	5.20	Result	Points	Notes	Overall
1	A	Vasiliy Kharlamov	Russia	–	–	–	–	–	–	–	–	–	o	–	o	xxo	o	o	o	5.20	972	PB	6699
2	A	Mikhail Logvinenko	Russia	–	–	–	–	–	–	–	–	–	o	–	xo	xxo	xo	xxo	xo	5.20	972	PB	6599
3	A	Stephen Cain	Australia	–	–	–	–	–	–	–	o	–	o	–	xxo	o	xo	xxx		5.00	910	PB	6114
4	A	Florian Geffrouais	France	–	–	–	–	–	–	–	–	–	xo	–	o	xxo	–	xxx		4.90	880	SB	5643
5	A	Cédric Nolf	Belgium	–	–	–	–	–	–	–	o	–	o	xo	xo	xxo	–	xxx		4.90	880	=PB	6414
6	A	Jérémy Solot	Belgium	–	–	–	–	–	o	–	o	–	xo	xxo	o	xxx				4.80	849	PB	5705
7	A	Gaël Quérin	France	–	–	–	–	–	–	–	o	–	o	xxo	xxx					4.70	819	SB	6407
8	A	Simon Walter	Switzerland	–	–	–	–	–	–	–	–	–	o	–	xxx					4.60	790		6232
9	B	Mikalai Shubianok	Belarus	–	–	–	–	–	o	o	o	o	xo	xxx						4.60	790	PB	6173
10	B	Tiago Marto	Portugal	–	–	–	o	–	o	–	o	xxo	xxx							4.50	760	PB	6039
11	A	Thomas Barrineau	Finland	–	–	–	–	–	–	–	o	–	xxx							4.40	731		5970
12	A	Ashley Bryant	Great Britain	–	–	–	o	–	xo	o	xxx									4.30	702		6307
13	B	Sun Gang	China	–	–	xo	–	xo	xxo	x										4.20	673		5696
14	B	Sami Itani	Finland	–	–	–	–	o	–	xxx										4.10	645		6002
15	B	Jonay Jordan	Spain	o	o	xo	o	xxx												4.00	617		5733
16	B	Christopher Crossley	Canada	–	–	o	xxx													3.90	590		5702
	B	Harald Boe	Norway																	NM	0		4477

=== Javelin throw ===
Rank	Group	Athlete	Nationality	#1	#2	#3	Result	Points	Notes	Overall
1	A	Cédric Nolf	Belgium	66.89	60.02	61.98	66.89	842	PB	7256
2	A	Ashley Bryant	Great Britain	59.63	56.24	64.08	64.08	799		7106
3	B	Vasiliy Kharlamov	Russia	61.45	62.82	61.71	62.82	780	PB	7479
4	B	Stephen Cain	Australia	53.09	61.40	59.64	61.40	759	PB	6873
5	B	Sun Gang	China	58.91	61.04	61.39	61.39	759	SB	6455
6	B	Florian Geffrouais	France	60.93	x	61.36	61.36	758	SB	6401
7	B	Mikalai Shubianok	Belarus	54.73	59.10	x	59.10	724	SB	6897
8	A	Thomas Barrineau	Finland	55.81	55.06	58.40	58.40	714	PB	6684
9	B	Tiago Marto	Portugal	57.95	50.89	x	57.95	707		6746
10	A	Jérémy Solot	Belgium	53.94	52.18	55.89	55.89	676	PB	6381
11	A	Simon Walter	Switzerland	53.75	49.69	52.48	53.75	644		6876
12	A	Christopher Crossley	Canada	x	53.60	x	53.60	642		6344
13	B	Sami Itani	Finland	48.22	49.76	–	49.76	585		6587
14	A	Gaël Quérin	France	46.84	46.90	49.43	49.43	580		6987
15	A	Jonay Jordan	Spain	43.73	47.64	x	47.64	554		6287
16	B	Mikhail Logvinenko	Russia	43.68	x	43.31	43.68	496		7095

=== 1500 metres ===
Rank	Name	Nationality	Time	Points	Notes
1	Gaël Quérin	France	4:11.56	870	
2	Florian Geffrouais	France	4:24.97	778	SB
3	Mikhail Logvinenko	Russia	4:30.77	740	
4	Thomas Barrineau	Finland	4:32.41	729	PB
5	Mikalai Shubianok	Belarus	4:32.41	723	
6	Tiago Marto	Portugal	4:38.58	689	
7	Stephen Cain	Australia	4:38.83	688	
8	Vasiliy Kharlamov	Russia	4:38.88	687	PB
9	Ashley Bryant	Great Britain	4:39.51	683	PB
10	Sami Itani	Finland	4:49.20	623	
11	Christopher Crossley	Canada	4:57.23	576	
12	Simon Walter	Switzerland	4:57.35	575	
13	Cédric Nolf	Belgium	4:59.66	562	PB
14	Jérémy Solot	Belgium	5:05.56	528	
15	Sun Gang	China	5:06.44	523	
16	Jonay Jordan	Spain	5:07.69	516	

=== Final standings ===
The highest mark recorded in each event is highlighted in yellow

Rank	Athlete	Nationality	100m	LJ	SP	HJ	400m	110m H	DT	PV	JT	1500m	Points	Notes
1st place, gold medalist(s)	Vasiliy Kharlamov	Russia	11.25	7.37	15.01	1.95	49.76	14.95	46.03	5.20	62.82	4:38.88	8166	
2nd place, silver medalist(s)	Gaël Quérin	France	11.12	7.44	12.37	1.98	48.54	14.68	39.20	4.70	49.43	4:11.56	7857	
3rd place, bronze medalist(s)	Mikhail Logvinenko	Russia	11.23	7.03	13.62	1.92	49.11	14.52	46.40	5.20	43.68	4:30.77	7835	
4	Cédric Nolf	Belgium	11.09	7.55	13.70	1.95	51.30	14.90	39.76	4.90	66.89	4:59.66	7818	
5	Ashley Bryant	Great Britain	11.08	7.48	13.32	1.89	48.59	14.71	40.46	4.30	64.08	4:39.51	7789	
6	Mikalai Shubianok	Belarus	11.60	7.00	14.31	2.01	50.79	15.38	41.47	4.60	59.10	4:33.38	7620	
7	Stephen Cain	Australia	11.36	6.74	13.50	1.86	51.22	15.05	41.23	5.00	61.40	4:38.83	7561	
8	Simon Walter	Switzerland	11.31	6.87	13.12	1.98	49.21	15.11	42.67	4.60	53.75	4:57.35	7451	
9	Tiago Marto	Portugal	11.29	6.82	13.56	1.95	52.21	14.85	40.17	4.50	57.95	4:38.58	7435	
10	Thomas Barrineau	Finland	11.18	6.77	12.79	1.95	49.25	15.19	35.33	4.40	58.40	4:32.41	7413	
11	Sami Itani	Finland	11.34	6.70	13.42	2.01	51.80	14.76	42.16	4.10	49.76	4:49.20	7210	
12	Florian Geffrouais	France	11.37	6.79	14.97	NM	48.96	15.07	43.07	4.90	61.36	4:24.97	7179	
13	Sun Gang	China	11.63	6.94	13.06	1.92	53.93	15.54	40.26	4.20	61.39	5:06.44	6978	
14	Christopher Crossley	Canada	11.36	6.96	12.72	1.86	50.73	15.73	39.42	3.90	53.60	4:57.23	6920	
15	Jérémy Solot	Belgium	11.28	7.18	14.34	1.98	50.25	14.89	NM	4.80	55.89	5:05.56	6909	
16	Jonay Jordan	Spain	11.23	6.78	13.23	1.83	50.41	14.71	34.33	4.00	47.64	5:07.69	6803	
	Harald Boe	Norway	11.58	6.09	11.62	1.71	51.59	16.26	34.46	NM	DNS	–	DNF	
	Hashim al-Sharfa	Saudi Arabia	11.16	6.88	11.74	1.86	DNF	DNS	–	–	–	–	DNF	
	Hadi Sepehrzad	Iran	11.28	6.51	15.17	DNS	–	–	–	–	–	–	DNF	
