= 2014 European Athletics Championships – Men's decathlon =

Men's decathlon at the European Athletics Championships

The men's decathlon at the 2014 European Athletics Championships took place at the Letzigrund on 12 and 13 August.

== Medalists ==
Gold	Andrei Krauchanka; Belarus
Silver	Kevin Mayer; France
Bronze	Ilya Shkurenyov; Russia

== Records ==
Standing records prior to the 2014 European Athletics Championships
World record	Ashton Eaton (USA)	9039 pts	Eugene, United States	23 June 2012
European record	Roman Šebrle (CZE)	9026 pts	Götzis, Austria	27 May 2001
Championship record	Daley Thompson (GBR)	8811 pts	Stuttgart, West Germany	28 August 1986
World Leading	Trey Hardee (USA)	8518 pts	Götzis, Austria	1 June 2014
European Leading	Kai Kazmirek (GER)	8471 pts	Götzis, Austria	1 June 2014

== Schedule ==
Date	Time	Round
12 August 2014	10:11	100 metres
12 August 2014	11:35	Long jump
12 August 2014	13:05	Shot put
12 August 2014	17:20	High jump
12 August 2014	19:42	400 metres
13 August 2014	10:05	110 metres hurdles
13 August 2014	10:50	Discus throw
13 August 2014	13:40	Pole vault
13 August 2014	17:58	Javelin throw
13 August 2014	20:36	1500 metres

All times are local times (UTC+2)

== Results ==
=== 100 metres ===
Wind: Heat 1: -1.1 m/s m/s, Heat 2: -0.9 m/s, Heat 3: -1.9 m/s

Rank	Heat	Name	Nationality	Time	Notes	Points
1	3	Rico Freimuth	Germany	10.71	F1	926
2	3	Kai Kazmirek	Germany	10.75	PB	917
3	2	Eelco Sintnicolaas	Netherlands	10.90	SB	883
3	3	Arthur Abele	Germany	10.90		883
5	3	Oleksiy Kasyanov	Ukraine	10.92		878
6	3	Dominik Distelberger	Austria	10.98		865
7	2	Ilya Shkurenyov	Russia	11.05		850
8	3	Pelle Rietveld	Netherlands	11.07		845
9	2	Kevin Mayer	France	11.10		838
10	1	Gaël Quérin	France	11.11		836
11	1	Andres Raja	Estonia	11.12	SB	834
11	2	Adam Helcelet	Czech Republic	11.12		834
13	3	Jiří Sýkora	Czech Republic	11.13		832
14	3	Eduard Mikhan	Belarus	11.15		827
15	2	Florian Geffrouais	France	11.16		825
16	2	Marek Lukáš	Czech Republic	11.19		819
17	2	Fabian Rosenquist	Sweden	11.19		819
18	1	Niels Pittomvils	Belgium	11.23	PB	810
18	3	Sergey Sviridov	Russia	11.23		810
20	1	Ashley Bryant	Great Britain	11.24		808
21	2	Thomas Van Der Plaetsen	Belgium	11.24		806
22	1	Marcus Nilsson	Sweden	11.30		795
23	1	Andrei Krauchanka	Belarus	11.31	SB	793
24	1	Lars Vikan Rise	Norway	11.40		774
25	1	Attila Zsivoczky	Hungary	11.52		748

=== Long jump ===
Rank	Group	Name	Nationality	#1	#2	#3	Result	Notes	Points	Total
1	B	Kai Kazmirek	Germany	7.66	7.68	x	7.68	980		1897
2	A	Kevin Mayer	France	7.65	6.79	7.39	7.65	972	PB	1810
3	B	Eelco Sintnicolaas	Netherlands	7.33	x	7.65	7.65	972	=PB	1855
4	B	Oleksiy Kasyanov	Ukraine	7.37	x	7.64	7.64	970	SB	1848
5	A	Andrei Krauchanka	Belarus	7.43	7.63	–	7.63	967		1760
6	B	Gaël Quérin	France	7.39	7.51	7.59	7.59	957	PB	1793
7	A	Arthur Abele	Germany	7.55	–	–	7.55	947	PB	1830
8	B	Thomas Van Der Plaetsen	Belgium	x	7.54	7.39	7.54	945		1751
9	B	Fabian Rosenquist	Sweden	7.38	7.51	x	7.51	937	SB	1756
10	B	Ilya Shkurenyov	Russia	x	7.50	x	7.50	935	SB	1785
11	B	Sergey Sviridov	Russia	7.21	7.38	7.39	7.39	908		1718
12	B	Ashley Bryant	Great Britain	7.21	7.39	7.34	7.39	908		1716
13	B	Rico Freimuth	Germany	7.15	7.34	7.36	7.36	900	SB	1826
14	A	Adam Helcelet	Czech Republic	7.21	7.34	7.32	7.34	896	SB	1730
15	A	Andres Raja	Estonia	x	6.94	7.28	7.28	881	SB	1715
16	A	Eduard Mikhan	Belarus	7.14	7.17	7.27	7.27	878	SB	1705
17	A	Lars Vikan Rise	Norway	7.16	x	7.21	7.21	864		1638
18	B	Dominik Distelberger	Austria	x	x	7.21	7.21	864		1729
19	B	Jiří Sýkora	Czech Republic	x	7.02	6.94	7.02	818		1650
20	A	Pelle Rietveld	Netherlands	6.74	7.00	6.87	7.00	814		1659
21	A	Marek Lukáš	Czech Republic	6.87	x	6.96	6.96	804		1623
22	A	Florian Geffrouais	France	x	x	6.89	6.89	788		1613
23	B	Niels Pittomvils	Belgium	6.88	x	3.93	6.88	785		1595
24	A	Attila Zsivoczky	Hungary	6.55	6.55	6.65	6.65	732		1480
25	A	Marcus Nilsson	Sweden	x	6.59	x	6.59	718		1513

=== Shot put ===
Rank	Group	Name	Nationality	#1	#2	#3	Result	Notes	Points	Total
1	B	Attila Zsivoczky	Hungary	15.04	15.56	14.87	15.56	824	SB	2304
2	B	Lars Vikan Rise	Norway	14.24	15.43	15.22	15.43	816		2454
3	B	Arthur Abele	Germany	15.15	15.39	14.85	15.39	814	PB	2644
4	A	Andrei Krauchanka	Belarus	14.64	x	15.19	15.19	801	PB	2561
5	B	Kevin Mayer	France	15.14	–	x	15.14	798	PB	2608
6	B	Marcus Nilsson	Sweden	14.93	x	x	14.93	785		2298
7	B	Adam Helcelet	Czech Republic	14.90	x	x	14.90	784		2514
8	B	Florian Geffrouais	France	x	x	14.85	14.85	780		2393
9	B	Eduard Mikhan	Belarus	14.66	14.19	x	14.66	769	SB	2474
10	A	Oleksiy Kasyanov	Ukraine	14.15	14.66	x	14.66	769	SB	2617
11	B	Rico Freimuth	Germany	14.39	14.13	14.38	14.39	752		2578
12	A	Eelco Sintnicolaas	Netherlands	13.86	14.09	14.28	14.28	745	SB	2600
13	A	Andres Raja	Estonia	13.92	14.22	x	14.22	742		2457
14	A	Ilya Shkurenyov	Russia	13.87	14.20	14.16	14.20	741	PB	2526
15	A	Thomas Van Der Plaetsen	Belgium	13.35	14.12	x	14.12	736	PB	2487
16	A	Gaël Quérin	France	x	13.25	14.02	14.02	730	PB	2523
17	B	Kai Kazmirek	Germany	12.80	14.01	x	14.01	729		2626
18	B	Sergey Sviridov	Russia	13.69	13.71	14.00	14.00	728		2446
19	A	Pelle Rietveld	Netherlands	x	13.70	13.75	13.75	713		2372
20	A	Jiří Sýkora	Czech Republic	13.66	x	x	13.66	708		2358
21	B	Marek Lukáš	Czech Republic	13.50	13.50	x	13.50	698		2321
22	A	Niels Pittomvils	Belgium	13.30	13.24	13.33	13.33	687		2282
23	B	Ashley Bryant	Great Britain	13.26	13.28	12.70	13.28	684		2400
24	A	Dominik Distelberger	Austria	12.66	12.93	12.78	12.93	663		2392
25	A	Fabian Rosenquist	Sweden	11.87	11.65	12.05	12.05	609		2365

=== High jump ===
Rank	Group	Name	Nationality	1.77	1.80	1.83	1.86	1.89	1.92	1.95	1.98	2.01	2.04	2.07	2.10	2.13	2.16	2.19	2.22	2.25	Result	Points	Notes	Total
1	A	Andrei Krauchanka	Belarus	–	–	–	–	–	–	–	–	o	–	o	o	o	o	o	o	xx	2.22	1012	=CB	3573
2	B	Kai Kazmirek	Germany	–	–	–	–	–	–	o	–	o	–	xo	o	xxo	xxx				2.13	925		3429
3	B	Thomas Van Der Plaetsen	Belgium	–	–	–	–	–	–	o	–	o	o	o	xxo	xxx					2.10	896	SB	3383
4	B	Ilya Shkurenyov	Russia	–	–	–	–	–	o	xo	o	o	xo	xxo	xxo	xxx					2.10	896	PB	3422
5	A	Andres Raja	Estonia	–	–	–	–	o	o	o	o	o	o	xxx							2.04	840	=PB	3297
6	B	Lars Vikan Rise	Norway	–	–	–	o	–	o	o	o	o	xo	xxx							2.04	840		3294
7	B	Attila Zsivoczky	Hungary	–	–	–	–	–	o	–	o	xxo	xxo	xxx							2.04	840		3144
8	B	Kevin Mayer	France	–	–	–	–	–	o	–	o	o	xxx								2.01	813		3421
9	A	Eelco Sintnicolaas	Netherlands	–	–	–	o	xo	o	xo	o	xo	xxx								2.01	813	SB	3413
10	A	Arthur Abele	Germany	–	–	–	o	o	xo	o	o	xx									1.98	785	SB	3429
10	B	Gaël Quérin	France	–	–	–	o	o	o	xo	o	xxx									1.98	785		3308
12	B	Dominik Distelberger	Austria	–	–	–	o	o	xo	xo	o	xxx									1.98	785		3177
13	B	Adam Helcelet	Czech Republic	–	–	–	–	o	o	xxo	o	xxx									1.98	785		3299
14	A	Rico Freimuth	Germany	–	o	o	xo	o	xxo	xxo	xo	xxx									1.98	785	SB	3363
15	B	Oleksiy Kasyanov	Ukraine	–	–	–	–	o	–	o	xxo	xxx									1.98	785		3402
16	B	Fabian Rosenquist	Sweden	–	–	–	o	–	o	xo	xxo	xxx									1.98	785		3150
17	A	Niels Pittomvils	Belgium	–	–	–	o	xo	xo	xxo	xxo	xxx									1.98	785	=SB	3067
18	A	Eduard Mikhan	Belarus	–	–	–	o	–	o	o	xxx										1.95	758	=SB	3232
19	B	Sergey Sviridov	Russia	–	o	o	o	xxo	xxo	o	xxx										1.95	758		3204
20	A	Florian Geffrouais	France	–	–	o	o	xo	xo	xo	xxx										1.95	758	SB	3151
21	A	Ashley Bryant	Great Britain	–	o	–	o	o	o	xxx											1.92	731		3131
22	A	Marek Lukáš	Czech Republic	–	o	o	o	o	xo	xxx											1.92	731	PB	3052
23	A	Marcus Nilsson	Sweden	–	–	–	o	xo	xxx												1.89	705		3003
24	A	Pelle Rietveld	Netherlands	o	xxx																1.77	602		2974
	B	Jiří Sýkora	Czech Republic																		DNS	0		DNF

=== 400 metres ===
Rank	Heat	Name	Nationality	Time	Points	Notes	Total
1	4	Kai Kazmirek	Germany	47.34	941		4492
2	2	Eelco Sintnicolaas	Netherlands	48.44	888	SB	4301
3	2	Rico Freimuth	Germany	48.53	884		4247
4	1	Arthur Abele	Germany	48.59	881	SB	4310
5	2	Gaël Quérin	France	48.76	873		4181
6	4	Fabian Rosenquist	Sweden	48.76	868	SB	4018
7	1	Oleksiy Kasyanov	Ukraine	48.88	867		4269
8	2	Dominik Distelberger	Austria	48.97	863		4040
9	3	Ilya Shkurenyov	Russia	49.00	861		4283
10	1	Florian Geffrouais	France	49.19	852		4003
11	4	Kevin Mayer	France	49.23	850	SB	4271
12	4	Sergey Sviridov	Russia	49.34	845		4049
13	1	Eduard Mikhan	Belarus	49.52	837		4069
14	2	Ashley Bryant	Great Britain	49.88	820		3951
15	4	Adam Helcelet	Czech Republic	50.07	811		4110
16	4	Marek Lukáš	Czech Republic	50.22	804		3856
17	2	Pelle Rietveld	Netherlands	50.33	799		3773
18	4	Thomas Van Der Plaetsen	Belgium	50.41	796		4179
19	1	Niels Pittomvils	Belgium	50.42	795		3862
20	3	Andrei Krauchanka	Belarus	50.53	790		4363
21	3	Attila Zsivoczky	Hungary	51.06	766		3910
22	3	Lars Vikan Rise	Norway	51.09	765		4059
23	3	Andres Raja	Estonia	51.28	757		4054
	3	Marcus Nilsson	Sweden	DNS	0		DNF

=== 110 metres hurdles ===
Wind:
Heat 1: +0.1 m/s, Heat 2: +0.6 m/s, Heat 3: +0.5 m/s

Rank	Heat	Name	Nationality	Time	Points	Notes	Total
1	3	Arthur Abele	Germany	13.55	1033	CB	5343
2	3	Rico Freimuth	Germany	13.63	1023	PB	5270
3	3	Oleksiy Kasyanov	Ukraine	13.95	981	PB	5250
4	3	Kai Kazmirek	Germany	14.05	968	PB	5460
5	3	Eelco Sintnicolaas	Netherlands	14.12	959		5260
6	2	Ilya Shkurenyov	Russia	14.14	957	SB	5240
7	1	Andrei Krauchanka	Belarus	14.20	949		5312
8	3	Gaël Quérin	France	14.23	945		5126
9	2	Dominik Distelberger	Austria	14.25	942	SB	4982
10	3	Kevin Mayer	France	14.28	939	=SB	4982
11	3	Andres Raja	Estonia	14.35	930		4984
12	2	Adam Helcelet	Czech Republic	14.39	925		5035
13	3	Pelle Rietveld	Netherlands	14.54	906		4679
14	2	Niels Pittomvils	Belgium	14.63	895		4757
15	2	Marek Lukáš	Czech Republic	14.67	890		4746
16	1	Florian Geffrouais	France	14.82	871	PB	4874
17	2	Thomas Van Der Plaetsen	Belgium	14.85	868		5047
18	2	Ashley Bryant	Great Britain	14.87	865		4816
19	1	Sergey Sviridov	Russia	15.02	847		4896
20	1	Fabian Rosenquist	Sweden	15.03	846		4864
21	2	Eduard Mikhan	Belarus	15.12	835		4904
22	1	Attila Zsivoczky	Hungary	15.26	818	=SB	4728
23	1	Lars Vikan Rise	Norway	15.74	762		4821

=== Discus throw ===
Rank	Group	Name	Nationality	#1	#2	#3	Result	Points	Notes	Total
1	B	Rico Freimuth	Germany	48.81	x	46.45	48.81	846		6116
2	B	Oleksiy Kasyanov	Ukraine	43.27	47.96	46.29	47.96	828	SB	6078
3	A	Andrei Krauchanka	Belarus	45.84	47.46	33.61	47.46	818		6130
4	B	Ilya Shkurenyov	Russia	45.00	46.04	45.71	46.04	788	PB	6028
5	B	Eduard Mikhan	Belarus	46.04	45.29	x	46.04	788		5692
6	A	Attila Zsivoczky	Hungary	x	44.00	44.82	44.82	763	SB	5491
7	A	Niels Pittomvils	Belgium	44.74	x	44.22	44.74	761		5518
8	A	Sergey Sviridov	Russia	34.62	x	44.57	44.57	758		5654
9	B	Kevin Mayer	France	43.73	44.53	x	44.53	757		5967
10	B	Kai Kazmirek	Germany	43.15	43.37	42.59	43.37	733		6193
11	B	Arthur Abele	Germany	x	43.14	43.25	43.25	731		6074
12	B	Gaël Quérin	France	43.08	x	x	43.08	727	PB	5853
13	A	Florian Geffrouais	France	29.67	42.72	42.47	42.72	720		5594
14	B	Eelco Sintnicolaas	Netherlands	39.30	42.56	x	42.56	717		5977
15	A	Thomas Van Der Plaetsen	Belgium	41.92	x	x	41.92	704		5751
16	B	Andres Raja	Estonia	41.14	41.89	x	41.89	703		5687
17	A	Lars Vikan Rise	Norway	38.93	x	41.57	41.57	697		5518
18	B	Ashley Bryant	Great Britain	41.49	40.39	40.22	41.49	695		5511
19	A	Fabian Rosenquist	Sweden	36.20	39.31	40.82	40.82	681		5545
20	A	Dominik Distelberger	Austria	35.95	x	40.46	40.46	674		5656
21	B	Pelle Rietveld	Netherlands	38.14	x	40.07	40.07	666	SB	5345
22	B	Adam Helcelet	Czech Republic	x	39.25	39.75	39.75	659		5694
23	A	Marek Lukáš	Czech Republic	39.55	38.47	38.03	39.55	655		5401

=== Pole vault ===
Rank	Group	Name	Nationality	4.00	4.10	4.20	4.30	4.40	4.50	4.60	4.70	4.80	4.90	5.00	5.10	5.20	5.30	5.40	5.50	Result	Points	Notes	Total
1	B	Eelco Sintnicolaas	Netherlands	–	–	–	–	–	–	–	–	–	–	o	–	xxo	xo	o	xxx	5.40	1035	SB	7012
2	B	Kevin Mayer	France	–	–	–	–	–	–	–	–	–	o	–	o	xo	xxx			5.20	972	=PB	6939
3	B	Ilya Shkurenyov	Russia	–	–	–	–	–	–	–	xo	o	o	o	o	xo	xxx			5.20	972	SB	7000
4	B	Thomas Van Der Plaetsen	Belgium	–	–	–	–	–	–	–	–	–	–	xo	o	xxo	xxx			5.20	972		6723
5=	B	Niels Pittomvils	Belgium	–	–	–	–	–	–	o	–	o	–	o	xxo	xxx				5.10	941	SB	6459
5=	A	Andrei Krauchanka	Belarus	–	–	–	–	–	–	–	o	–	xxo	o	xxo	xxx				5.10	941		7071
7	B	Gaël Quérin	France	–	–	–	–	–	–	o	–	o	o	xxx						4.90	880		6733
8	B	Dominik Distelberger	Austria	–	–	–	–	–	–	o	xo	xxo	o	xxx						4.90	880	=PB	6536
9	A	Rico Freimuth	Germany	–	–	–	–	–	–	o	o	xxo	xxx							4.80	849		6965
10	B	Arthur Abele	Germany	–	–	–	–	–	–	xxo	xxo	–	xxx							4.70	819		6893
11	A	Oleksiy Kasyanov	Ukraine	–	–	–	–	o	–	o	xxx									4.60	790		6868
11	B	Adam Helcelet	Czech Republic	–	–	–	–	–	o	o	xxx									4.60	790		6484
13	A	Florian Geffrouais	France	–	–	–	–	o	–	xo	xxx									4.60	790	=SB	6384
13	B	Kai Kazmirek	Germany	–	–	–	–	–	–	xo	–	xxx								4.60	790		6983
15	A	Fabian Rosenquist	Sweden	–	–	–	o	–	o	xxx										4.50	760		6305
16	A	Lars Vikan Rise	Norway	–	–	o	o	o	xxo	xxx										4.50	760		6278
17	A	Marek Lukáš	Czech Republic	–	–	xo	o	xo	xxo	xxx										4.50	760		6161
18	A	Attila Zsivoczky	Hungary	–	–	o	xxo	xo	xxx											4.40	731		6222
19	B	Eduard Mikhan	Belarus	–	–	–	–	xxo	–	xxr										4.40	731		6423
20	A	Sergey Sviridov	Russia	xxo	o	xxo	o	xr												4.30	702		6356
21	A	Andres Raja	Estonia	–	–	xxo	xxo	xxx												4.30	702		6389
	A	Ashley Bryant	Great Britain																	DNS	0		DNF
	B	Pelle Rietveld	Netherlands																	DNS	0		DNF

=== Javelin throw ===
Rank	Group	Name	Nationality	#1	#2	#3	Result	Points	Notes	Total
1	B	Andrei Krauchanka	Belarus	60.63	62.59	68.11	68.11	861	PB	7932
2	A	Lars Vikan Rise	Norway	66.34	63.90	61.49	66.34	834		7112
3	A	Marek Lukáš	Czech Republic	64.12	65.84	64.30	65.84	826		6987
4	A	Adam Helcelet	Czech Republic	60.62	61.89	65.32	65.32	818	PB	7302
5	B	Kevin Mayer	France	64.03	61.60	x	64.03	799	SB	7738
6	B	Ilya Shkurenyov	Russia	60.10	x	63.58	63.58	792	PB	7792
7	A	Kai Kazmirek	Germany	63.12	63.17	55.87	63.17	786	PB	7769
8	B	Rico Freimuth	Germany	62.27	60.38	62.74	62.74	779	SB	7744
9	A	Arthur Abele	Germany	61.34	59.68	62.45	62.45	775		7668
10	B	Thomas Van Der Plaetsen	Belgium	57.01	54.46	60.95	60.95	752		7475
11	A	Florian Geffrouais	France	55.74	57.94	59.46	59.46	730		7114
12	B	Eelco Sintnicolaas	Netherlands	57.81	59.37	55.79	59.37	728		7740
13	A	Dominik Distelberger	Austria	53.43	58.02	54.80	58.02	708		7244
14	B	Niels Pittomvils	Belgium	55.86	57.76	x	57.76	704	SB	7163
15	A	Attila Zsivoczky	Hungary	56.74	56.89	57.40	57.40	699		6921
16	A	Andres Raja	Estonia	52.23	52.51	x	52.51	626		7015
17	A	Oleksiy Kasyanov	Ukraine	52.33	48.02	49.75	52.33	623	SB	7491
18	A	Gaël Quérin	France	51.09	51.67	49.79	51.67	613	SB	7346
19	A	Fabian Rosenquist	Sweden	45.92	45.35	45.07	45.92	528		6833
	A	Eduard Mikhan	Belarus				DNS	0		DNF

=== 1500 metres ===
Rank	Name	Nationality	Result	Points	Notes
1	Gaël Quérin	France	4:14.73	848	SB
2	Arthur Abele	Germany	4:20.37	809	SB
3	Florian Geffrouais	France	4:23.84	786	
4	Kevin Mayer	France	4:24.16	783	SB
5	Oleksiy Kasyanov	Ukraine	4:30.76	740	SB
6	Eelco Sintnicolaas	Netherlands	4:30.95	738	
7	Lars Vikan Rise	Norway	4:32.77	727	SB
8	Attila Zsivoczky	Hungary	4:33.04	725	SB
9	Fabian Rosenquist	Sweden	4:34.79	713	
10	Ilya Shkurenyov	Russia	4:34.89	706	SB
11	Dominik Distelberger	Austria	4:37.22	698	
12	Niels Pittomvils	Belgium	4:38.57	689	
13	Kai Kazmirek	Germany	4:38.67	689	
14	Andrei Krauchanka	Belarus	4:39.39	684	
15	Marek Lukáš	Czech Republic	4:41.16	673	
16	Adam Helcelet	Czech Republic	4:44.33	653	
17	Thomas Van Der Plaetsen	Belgium	4:48.18	630	
18	Andres Raja	Estonia	4:59.08	565	SB
19	Rico Freimuth	Germany	4:59.27	564	

=== Final standings ===
The highest mark recorded in each event is highlighted in yellow

Rank	Athlete	Nationality	100m	LJ	SP	HJ	400m	110m H	DT	PV	JT	1500m	Points	Notes
1st place, gold medalist(s)	Andrei Krauchanka	Belarus	11.31	7.63	15.19	2.22	50.53	14.20	47.46	5.10	68.11	4:39.39	8616	WL
2nd place, silver medalist(s)	Kevin Mayer	France	11.10	7.65	15.14	2.01	49.23	14.28	44.53	5.20	64.03	4:24.16	8521	NUR
3rd place, bronze medalist(s)	Ilya Shkurenyov	Russia	11.05	7.50	14.20	2.10	49.00	14.14	46.04	5.20	63.58	4:35.89	8498	PB
4	Eelco Sintnicolaas	Netherlands	10.90	7.65	14.28	2.01	48.44	14.12	42.56	5.40	59.37	4:30.95	8478	SB
5	Arthur Abele	Germany	10.90	7.55	15.39	1.98	48.59	13.55	43.25	4.70	62.45	4:20.37	8477	PB
6	Kai Kazmirek	Germany	10.75	7.68	14.01	2.13	47.34	14.05	43.37	4.60	63.17	4:38.67	8458	
7	Rico Freimuth	Germany	10.71	7.36	14.39	1.98	48.53	13.63	48.81	4.80	62.74	4:59.27	8308	
8	Oleksiy Kasyanov	Ukraine	10.92	7.64	14.66	1.98	48.88	13.95	47.96	4.60	52.33	4:30.76	8231	SB
9	Gaël Quérin	France	11.11	7.59	14.02	1.98	48.76	14.23	43.08	4.90	51.67	4:14.73	8194	PB
10	Thomas Van Der Plaetsen	Belgium	11.25	7.54	14.12	2.10	50.41	14.85	41.92	5.20	60.95	4:48.18	8105	
11	Adam Helcelet	Czech Republic	11.12	7.34	14.90	1.98	50.07	14.39	39.75	4.60	65.32	4:44.33	7955	
12	Dominik Distelberger	Austria	10.98	7.21	12.93	1.98	48.97	14.25	40.46	4.90	58.02	4:37.22	7942	
13	Florian Geffrouais	France	11.16	6.89	14.85	1.95	49.19	14.82	42.72	4.60	59.46	4:23.84	7900	
14	Niels Pittomvils	Belgium	11.23	6.88	13.33	1.98	50.42	14.63	44.74	5.10	57.76	4:38.57	7852	
15	Lars Vikan Rise	Norway	11.40	7.21	15.43	2.04	51.09	15.74	41.57	4.50	66.34	4:32.77	7839	
16	Marek Lukáš	Czech Republic	11.19	6.96	13.50	1.92	50.22	14.67	39.55	4.50	65.84	4:41.16	7660	
17	Attila Zsivoczky	Hungary	11.52	6.65	15.56	2.04	51.06	15.26	44.82	4.40	57.40	4:33.04	7646	
18	Andres Raja	Estonia	11.12	7.28	14.22	2.04	51.28	14.35	41.89	4.30	52.51	4:59.08	7580	SB
19	Fabian Rosenquist	Sweden	11.19	7.51	12.05	1.98	48.86	15.03	40.82	4.50	45.92	4:34.79	7546	
	Eduard Mikhan	Belarus	11.15	7.27	14.66	1.95	49.52	15.12	46.04	4.40	DNS	–	DNF	
	Sergey Sviridov	Russia	11.23	7.39	14.00	1.95	49.34	15.02	44.57	4.30	DNS	–	DNF	
	Ashley Bryant	Great Britain	11.24	7.39	13.28	1.92	49.88	14.87	41.49	DNS	–	–	DNF	
	Pelle Rietveld	Netherlands	11.07	7.00	13.75	1.77	50.33	14.54	40.07	DNS	–	–	DNF	
	Marcus Nilsson	Sweden	11.30	6.59	14.93	1.89	DNS	–	–	–	–	–	DNF	
	Jiří Sýkora	Czech Republic	11.13	7.02	13.66	–	–	–	–	–	–	–	DNF	
