= 2011 European Athletics U23 Championships – Men's decathlon =

The men's decathlon at the 2011 European Athletics U23 Championships was held at the Městský stadion on 14 and 15 July.

== Medalists ==
Gold	Thomas Van der Plaetsen; Belgium (BEL)
Silver	Eduard Mikhan; Belarus (BLR)
Bronze	Mihail Dudaš; Serbia (SRB)

== Schedule ==
Date	Time	Round
14 July 2011	10:00	100 metres
14 July 2011	11:00	Long jump
14 July 2011	12:20	Shot put
14 July 2011	16:30	High jump
14 July 2011	19:40	400 metres
15 July 2011	11:15	110 metres hurdles
15 July 2011	12:15	Discus throw
15 July 2011	15:15	Pole vault
15 July 2011	17:30	Javelin throw
15 July 2011	19:45	1500 metres

== Results ==
=== 100 metres ===
Rank	Name	Nationality	React	Time	Notes	Points
1	Dominik Distelberger	Austria	0.148	10.54	PB	966
2	Mihail Dudaš	Serbia	0.154	10.71	PB	926
3	Eduard Mikhan	Belarus	0.128	10.77	PB	912
4	Adam Sebastian Helcelet	Czech Republic	0.150	10.81	PB	903
5	Kai Kazmierek	Germany	0.156	10.93	PB	876
6	David Kallebäck	Sweden	0.157	10.95	SB	872
6	Jérémy Lelievre	France	0.206	10.95	PB	872
8	Artem Lukyanenko	Russia	0.189	10.96		870
8	Michal Stefek	Czech Republic	0.126	10.96	=PB	870
10	Petter Olson	Sweden	0.203	10.99		863
11	Jan Felix Knobel	Germany	0.187	11.07	PB	845
12	Ilya Shkurenev	Russia	0.174	11.09	PB	841
13	Jonay Jordan	Spain	0.150	11.13		832
14	Maximilian Gilde	Germany	0.167	11.16	PB	825
15	Einar Dadi Larusson	Iceland	0.176	11.17	PB	823
16	Marcin Przybył	Poland	0.141	11.19	PB	819
17	Cédric Nolf	Belgium	0.195	11.27		801
18	Thomas Van der Plaetsen	Belgium	0.186	11.29	SB	797
19	Bastien Auzeil	France	0.191	11.54		744
20	Szymon Czapiewski	Poland	0.174	11.72		707
21	Marcus Nilsson	Sweden	0.185	11.83		685
22	Hendrik Lepik	Estonia	0.182	11.85		681

=== Long jump ===
Rank	Athlete	Nationality	#1	#2	#3	Result	Notes	Points
1	Thomas Van der Plaetsen	Belgium	7.68	7.54	x	7.68	PB	980
2	Eduard Mikhan	Belarus	7.13	7.54	-	7.54	PB	945
3	Mihail Dudaš	Serbia	7.35	6.98	7.46	7.46		925
4	Dominik Distelberger	Austria	7.23	x	7.41	7.41		913
5	Kai Kazmierek	Germany	6.93	7.38	7.08	7.38		905
6	Maximilian Gilde	Germany	x	7.35	7.34	7.35		898
7	Einar Dadi Larusson	Iceland	7.12	7.28	7.12	7.28	PB	881
7	Adam Sebastian Helcelet	Czech Republic	6.88	7.18	7.28	7.28		881
9	Ilya Shkurenev	Russia	7.14	7.26	7.27	7.27	SB	878
10	Jan Felix Knobel	Germany	x	7.23	6.94	7.23	=PB	869
11	Cédric Nolf	Belgium	7.12	7.18	x	7.18		857
11	Bastien Auzeil	France	7.18	7.01	x	7.18		857
11	Szymon Czapiewski	Poland	6.86	7.18	x	7.18		857
14	Petter Olson	Sweden	7.09	x	x	7.09	PB	835
15	Marcin Przybył	Poland	6.97	7.05	6.84	7.05		826
16	Michal Stefek	Czech Republic	x	6.96	6.97	6.97		807
16	Jérémy Lelievre	France	6.84	6.97	x	6.97		807
18	Jonay Jordan	Spain	x	6.89	x	6.89		788
19	Artem Lukyanenko	Russia	6.84	6.84	6.86	6.86		781
20	David Kallebäck	Sweden	x	6.85	x	6.85		778
21	Hendrik Lepik	Estonia	4.51	6.68	6.75	6.75		755
22	Marcus Nilsson	Sweden	x	6.28	4.90	6.28		648

=== Shot put ===
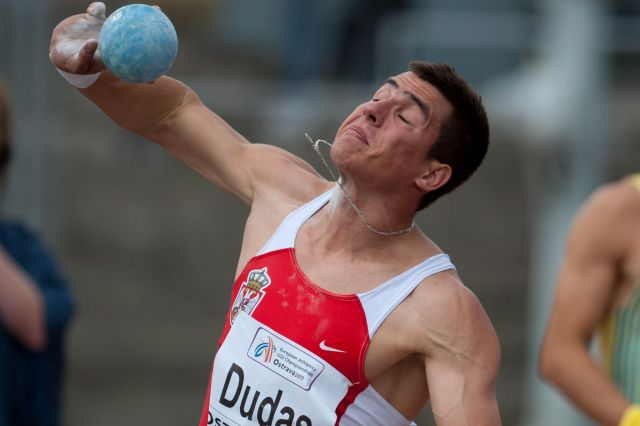
Mihail Dudaš competing in the shot put event

Rank	Athlete	Nationality	#1	#2	#3	Result	Notes	Points
1	Jan Felix Knobel	Germany	15.42	15.43	15.23	15.43		816
2	Bastien Auzeil	France	14.81	14.74	15.35	15.35		811
3	Artem Lukyanenko	Russia	12.81	13.76	14.39	14.39		752
4	Jérémy Lelievre	France	14.33	13.94	x	14.33	PB	749
5	Eduard Mikhan	Belarus	13.54	13.98	x	13.98	PB	727
6	David Kallebäck	Sweden	x	13.83	13.96	13.96	PB	726
7	Adam Sebastian Helcelet	Czech Republic	x	13.45	13.85	13.85	PB	719
8	Cédric Nolf	Belgium	12.88	x	13.48	13.48		697
9	Marcin Przybył	Poland	12.69	13.41	x	13.41		692
10	Jonay Jordan	Spain	13.13	13.07	13.40	13.40		692
11	Thomas Van der Plaetsen	Belgium	13.31	x	x	13.31	PB	686
12	Hendrik Lepik	Estonia	12.87	13.30	x	13.30		686
13	Marcus Nilsson	Sweden	11.94	12.71	13.29	13.29		685
14	Mihail Dudaš	Serbia	11.95	12.70	13.18	13.18		678
15	Petter Olson	Sweden	12.80	x	12.90	12.90		661
16	Ilya Shkurenev	Russia	12.76	12.83	12.88	12.88	PB	660
16	Michal Stefek	Czech Republic	11.86	12.50	12.88	12.88	PB	660
18	Szymon Czapiewski	Poland	12.74	12.50	x	12.74		651
19	Maximilian Gilde	Germany	12.57	12.72	x	12.72		650
20	Kai Kazmierek	Germany	11.83	11.62	12.14	12.14		615
21	Dominik Distelberger	Austria	9.49	11.45	11.17	11.45		573
22	Einar Dadi Larusson	Iceland	11.42	10.80	11.32	11.42		571

=== High jump ===
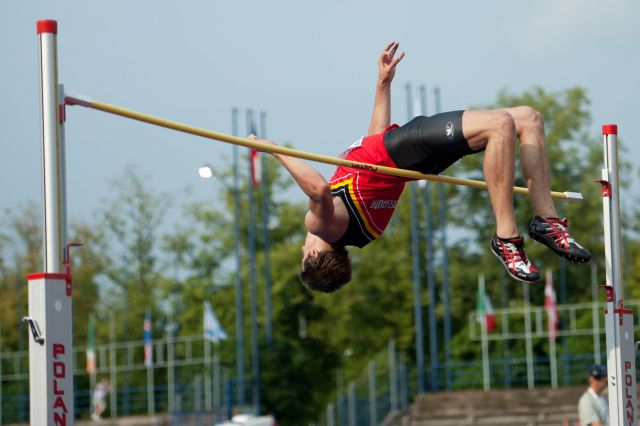
Thomas Van der Plaetsen, the winner of the high jump and the whole competition

Rank	Athlete	Nationality	Result	Notes	Points
1	Thomas Van der Plaetsen	Belgium	2.07		868
2	Hendrik Lepik	Estonia	2.04		840
2	Kai Kazmierek	Germany	2.04		840
2	Adam Sebastian Helcelet	Czech Republic	2.04		840
5	Ilya Shkurenev	Russia	2.01	SB	813
6	Bastien Auzeil	France	1.98		785
6	Einar Dadi Larusson	Iceland	1.98		785
6	Mihail Dudaš	Serbia	1.98		785
9	David Kallebäck	Sweden	1.95		758
9	Artem Lukyanenko	Russia	1.95	SB	758
9	Petter Olson	Sweden	1.95	SB	758
9	Szymon Czapiewski	Poland	1.95		758
9	Eduard Mikhan	Belarus	1.95		758
9	Michal Stefek	Czech Republic	1.95		758
15	Maximilian Gilde	Germany	1.92		731
15	Jonay Jordan	Spain	1.92		731
15	Jan Felix Knobel	Germany	1.92		731
18	Cédric Nolf	Belgium	1.89		705
18	Dominik Distelberger	Austria	1.89		705
20	Marcus Nilsson	Sweden	1.83		653
21	Jérémy Lelievre	France	1.80		627
	Marcin Przybył	Poland		DNS	

=== 400 metres ===
Rank	Name	Nationality	React	Time	Notes	Points
1	Kai Kazmierek	Germany	0.153	46.75	PB	971
2	Mihail Dudaš	Serbia	0.186	47.47	PB	935
3	Dominik Distelberger	Austria	0.183	47.94	SB	912
4	Eduard Mikhan	Belarus	0.211	48.02	PB	908
5	Petter Olson	Sweden	0.172	48.36	PB	892
6	Thomas Van der Plaetsen	Belgium	0.185	48.64	PB	878
7	Adam Sebastian Helcelet	Czech Republic	0.172	48.82		870
8	Jérémy Lelievre	France	0.226	49.07	PB	858
9	Jan Felix Knobel	Germany	0.173	49.17	SB	853
10	Einar Dadi Larusson	Iceland	0.195	49.32		846
11	Artem Lukyanenko	Russia	0.185	49.41		842
12	Michal Stefek	Czech Republic	0.167	49.44	=PB	841
13	Ilya Skhurenev	Russia	0.182	49.84	PB	822
14	Maximilian Gilde	Germany	0.181	50.05		812
15	Cédric Nolf	Belgium	0.239	50.30		801
16	Jonay Jordan	Spain	0.174	50.76		780
17	Bastien Auzeil	France	0.182	51.39		752
18	Marcus Nilsson	Sweden	0.206	51.55		745
19	Szymon Czapiewski	Poland	0.185	51.67		739
20	Hendrik Lepik	Estonia	0.210	52.73		693
	David Kallebäck	Sweden			DNS	
	Marcin Przybył	Poland			DNS	

=== 110 metres hurdles ===
Rank	Name	Nationality	React	Time	Notes	Points
1	Artem Lukyanenko	Russia	0.163	14.33		932
2	Adam Sebastian Helcelet	Czech Republic	0.153	14.35	PB	930
3	Dominik Distelberger	Austria	0.179	14.43		920
4	Kai Kazmierek	Germany	0.149	14.56		903
5	Thomas Van der Plaetsen	Belgium	0.181	14.68		889
6	Petter Olson	Sweden	0.179	14.73		882
7	Maximilian Gilde	Germany	0.154	14.76	PB	879
8	Eduard Mikhan	Belarus		14.80		874
9	Einar Dadi Larusson	Iceland	0.175	14.82		871
10	Jonay Jordan	Spain	0.150	14.85		868
11	Ilya Skhurenev	Russia	0.188	14.97		853
11	Jérémy Lelievre	France	0.232	14.97	PB	853
13	Cédric Nolf	Belgium	0.176	15.03		846
14	Bastien Auzeil	France	0.178	15.13		834
14	Mihail Dudaš	Serbia	0.096	15.13		834
16	Szymon Czapiewski	Poland	0.191	15.61		777
17	Marcus Nilsson	Sweden	0.192	15.62		776
18	Hendrik Lepik	Estonia	0.060	15.90		744
19	Michal Stefek	Czech Republic	0.154	16.94		631
	Jan Felix Knobel	Germany	0.176		DNF	0
	David Kallebäck	Sweden			DNS	

=== Discus throw ===
Rank	Athlete	Nationality	#1	#2	#3	Result	Notes	Points
1	Jan Felix Knobel	Germany	49.09	x	x	49.09	PB	851
2	Eduard Mikhan	Belarus	40.90	44.54	42.65	44.54		757
3	Mihail Dudaš	Serbia	43.23	43.67	43.19	43.67		740
4	Ilya Shkurenev	Russia	40.48	40.97	42.55	42.55	SB	717
5	Marcus Nilsson	Sweden	41.30	x	42.52	42.52	PB	716
6	Cédric Nolf	Belgium	39.96	37.44	41.60	41.60		697
7	Jérémy Lelievre	France	40.55	41.35	40.60	41.35	PB	692
8	Bastien Auzeil	France	40.76	x	40.56	40.76		680
9	Petter Olson	Sweden	40.54	37.66	40.44	40.54	PB	676
10	Szymon Czapiewski	Poland	31.77	39.73	39.34	39.73		659
11	Jonay Jordan	Spain	38.54	x	39.67	39.67	PB	658
12	Dominik Distelberger	Austria	39.03	x	x	39.03		645
13	Artem Lukyanenko	Russia	x	37.19	38.73	38.73		639
14	Maximilian Gilde	Germany	38.17	36.93	x	38.17		627
15	Adam Sebastian Helcelet	Czech Republic	37.77	x	x	37.77		619
16	Thomas Van der Plaetsen	Belgium	x	37.73	x	37.73	PB	619
17	Hendrik Lepik	Estonia	37.43	x	36.93	37.43		613
18	Kai Kazmierek	Germany	x	37.42	x	37.42		613
19	Einar Dadi Larusson	Iceland	33.63	31.90	36.12	36.12		586
20	Michal Stefek	Czech Republic	35.47	33.67	x	35.47		573
	David Kallebäck	Sweden					DNS	

=== Pole vault ===
Rank	Athlete	Nationality	Result	Notes	Points
1	Thomas Van der Plaetsen	Belgium	5.10	PB	941
2	Jan Felix Knobel	Germany	5.00	PB	910
3	Ilya Shkurenev	Russia	5.00		910
4	Szymon Czapiewski	Poland	4.90	SB	880
5	Cédric Nolf	Belgium	4.90	PB	880
6	Einar Dadi Larusson	Iceland	4.90	PB	880
7	Bastien Auzeil	France	4.80		849
8	Mihail Dudaš	Serbia	4.70		819
9	Adam Sebastian Helcelet	Czech Republic	4.60		790
10	Petter Olson	Sweden	4.60		790
11	Hendrik Lepik	Estonia	4.60		790
12	Eduard Mikhan	Belarus	4.60	SB	790
13	Dominik Distelberger	Austria	4.50		760
14	Kai Kazmierek	Germany	4.50		760
15	Michal Stefek	Czech Republic	4.40		731
16	Marcus Nilsson	Sweden	4.30		702
17	Maximilian Gilde	Germany	4.30		702
18	Jérémy Lelievre	France	4.30	=SB	702
19	Artem Lukyanenko	Russia	4.00		617
	Jonay Jordan	Spain		NM	0
	David Kallebäck	Sweden		DNS	

=== Javelin throw ===
Rank	Athlete	Nationality	#1	#2	#3	Result	Notes	Points
1	Jan Felix Knobel	Germany	70.64	x	69.46	70.64		899
2	Cédric Nolf	Belgium	65.60	61.12	65.70	65.70		824
3	Maximilian Gilde	Germany	64.72	65.23	59.31	65.23	PB	817
4	Thomas Van der Plaetsen	Belgium	63.57	60.80	62.15	63.57	PB	792
5	Adam Sebastian Helcelet	Czech Republic	51.51	x	61.21	61.21	PB	756
6	Marcus Nilsson	Sweden	54.92	54.69	59.07	59.07		724
7	Ilya Shkurenev	Russia	56.79	58.70	59.01	59.01	PB	723
8	Mihail Dudaš	Serbia	55.79	54.89	58.58	58.58	PB	716
9	Eduard Mikhan	Belarus	53.71	57.10	55.60	57.10	PB	694
10	Michal Stefek	Czech Republic	x	55.68	52.33	55.68		673
11	Artem Lukyanenko	Russia	54.93	55.46	51.87	55.46	PB	670
12	Kai Kazmierek	Germany	54.06	50.93	52.75	54.06	SB	649
13	Dominik Distelberger	Austria	52.21	52.18	49.17	52.21	SB	621
14	Petter Olson	Sweden	49.68	46.41	50.66	50.66		598
15	Bastien Auzeil	France	x	50.45	x	50.45		595
16	Jonay Jordan	Spain	49.86	50.08	48.29	50.08	PB	590
17	Jérémy Lelievre	France	47.49	48.91	49.90	49.90		587
18	Szymon Czapiewski	Poland	48.57	49.00	48.39	49.00		574
19	Einar Dadi Larusson	Iceland	47.46	45.11	47.5	47.57		553
20	Hendrik Lepik	Estonia	46.39	x	43.29	46.39		535

=== 1500 metres ===
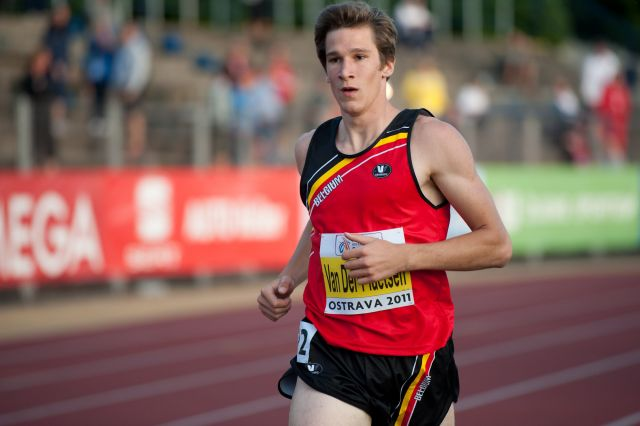
Gold medalist Thomas Van der Plaetsen competing in the 1500 metres event

Rank	Name	Nationality	Time	Notes	Points
1	Marcus Nilsson	Sweden	4:20.64	SB	807
2	Eduard Mikhan	Belarus	4:23.67	PB	787
3	Petter Olson	Sweden	4:26.29	PB	769
4	Mihail Dudaš	Serbia	4:27.79		759
5	Dominik Distelberger	Austria	4:33.83	SB	720
6	Artem Lukyanenko	Russia	4:34.34	SB	716
7	Einar Dadi Larusson	Iceland	4:34.96	PB	712
8	Michal Stefek	Czech Republic	4:35.03		712
9	Thomas Van der Plaetsen	Belgium	4:35.84		707
10	Maximilian Gilde	Germany	4:40.51		677
11	Ilya Shkurenev	Russia	4:40.56		677
12	Kai Kazmierek	Germany	4:41.79		669
13	Adam Sebastian Helcelet	Czech Republic	4:43.55		658
14	Jérémy Lelievre	France	4:49.63		621
15	Hendrik Lepik	Estonia	5:01.03		554
16	Cédric Nolf	Belgium	5:04.91		532
17	Bastien Auzeil	France	5:05.52		528
18	Szymon Czapiewski	Poland	5:05.87		526
19	Jonay Jordan	Spain	5:14.14		481
	Jan Felix Knobel	Germany	DNF		0

=== Final standings ===
Rank	Name	Nationality	Points	Notes
1st place, gold medalist(s)	Thomas Van der Plaetsen	Belgium	8157	PB
2nd place, silver medalist(s)	Eduard Mikhan	Belarus	8152	PB
3rd place, bronze medalist(s)	Mihail Dudaš	Serbia	8117	NR
4	Adam Sebastian Helcelet	Czech Republic	7966	
5	Ilya Shkurenev	Russia	7894	PB
6	Kai Kazmierek	Germany	7800	
7	Dominik Distelberger	Austria	7735	
8	Petter Olson	Sweden	7724	PB
9	Cédric Nolf	Belgium	7640	PB
10	Maximilian Gilde	Germany	7618	
11	Artem Lukyanenko	Russia	7577	
12	Einar Dadi Larusson	Iceland	7508	
13	Bastien Auzeil	France	7435	
14	Jérémy Lelievre	France	7368	
15	Michal Stefek	Czech Republic	7256	
16	Marcus Nilsson	Sweden	7141	
17	Szymon Czapiewski	Poland	7128	
18	Hendrik Lepik	Estonia	6891	
19	Jan Felix Knobel	Germany	6774	
20	Jonay Jordan	Spain	6420	
	Marcin Przybył	Poland	DNF	
	David Kallebäck	Sweden	DNF	

== Participation ==
According to an unofficial count, 22 athletes from 13 countries participated in the event.

- Austria (1)
- Belarus (1)
- Belgium (2)
- Czech Republic (2)
- Estonia (1)
- France (2)
- Germany (3)
- Iceland (1)
- Poland (2)
- Russia (2)
- Serbia (1)
- Spain (1)
- Sweden (3)
