= 2016 European Athletics Championships – Men's decathlon =

Men's decathlon at the European Athletics Championships
- Venue: Olympic Stadium
- Location: Amsterdam
- Dates: 6 and 7 July
- Competitors: 28 from 16 nations
- Winning points: 8218 pts

Medalists
gold medal	Thomas van der Plaetsen	Belgium
silver medal	Adam Helcelet	Czech Republic
bronze medal	Mihail Dudaš	Serbia

The men's decathlon at the 2016 European Athletics Championships took place at the Olympic Stadium in Amsterdam, Netherlands on 6 and 7 July.

== Records ==
Standing records prior to the 2016 European Athletics Championships
World record	Ashton Eaton (USA)	9045 pts	Beijing, China	29 August 2015
European record	Roman Šebrle (CZE)	9026 pts	Götzis, Austria	27 May 2001
Championship record	Daley Thompson (GBR)	8811 pts	Stuttgart, West Germany	28 August 1986
World Leading	Damian Warner (CAN)	8523 pts	Götzis, Austria	29 May 2016
European Leading	Kevin Mayer (FRA)	8446 pts	Götzis, Austria	29 May 2016

== Schedule ==
Date	Time	Round
6 July 2016	10:50	100 metres
6 July 2016	11:45	Long jump
6 July 2016	13:25	Shot put
6 July 2016	15:30	High jump
6 July 2016	19:35	400 metres
7 July 2016	09:30	110 metres hurdles
7 July 2016	10:20	Discus throw
7 July 2016	13:00	Pole vault
7 July 2016	16:05	Javelin throw
7 July 2016	19:20	1500 metres

All times are local times (UTC+2)

== Results ==
=== 100 metres ===
Rank	Heat	Name	Nationality	Time	Notes	Points
1	4	Oleksiy Kasyanov	Ukraine	10.79		908
2	4	Martin Roe	Norway	10.86		892
3	4	Mihail Dudaš	Serbia	10.90		883
4	4	Dominik Distelberger	Austria	10.91		881
5	4	Paweł Wiesiołek	Poland	10.93		876
6	3	Jorge Ureña	Spain	11.04		852
7	4	Adam Helcelet	Czech Republic	11.07		845
8	2	Kristjan Rosenberg	Estonia	11.11	SB	836
8	4	Eelco Sintnicolaas	Netherlands	11.11		836
10	2	Ashley Bryant	Great Britain	11.12		834
11	3	Fredrik Samuelsson	Sweden	11.13		832
12	3	Jiří Sýkora	Czech Republic	11.15		827
13	3	Pieter Braun	Netherlands	11.15		827
14	3	Mathias Brugger	Germany	11.16		825
15	3	Marek Lukáš	Czech Republic	11.17		823
16	1	Niels Pittomvils	Belgium	11.18		821
17	2	Romain Barras	France	11.19		819
18	1	Jonas Fringeli	Switzerland	11.20		817
19	1	Janek Õiglane	Estonia	11.21	PB	814
20	2	Tim Nowak	Germany	11.23		810
21	2	Thomas van der Plaetsen	Belgium	11.23		810
22	1	Marcus Nilsson	Sweden	11.29	SB	797
23	2	Florian Geffrouais	France	11.30		795
24	1	Darko Pešić	Montenegro	11.31	SB	793
25	3	Hans van Alphen	Belgium	11.39		776
26	1	Lars Vikan Rise	Norway	11.40		774
27	1	René Stauß	Germany	11.40	SB	774
	2	Mikk Pahapill	Estonia	DNS		0

=== Long jump ===
Rank	Group	Name	Nationality	#1	#2	#3	Result	Notes	Points	Total
1	B	Thomas van der Plaetsen	Belgium	7.64	x	x	7.64		970	1780
2	B	Ashley Bryant	Great Britain	7.10	7.54	7.56	7.56		950	1784
3	B	Jorge Ureña	Spain	7.54	7.45	7.29	7.54	PB	945	1797
4	A	Martin Roe	Norway	7.03	7.50	x	7.50	PB	935	1827
5	B	Mihail Dudaš	Serbia	7.13	7.44	7.34	7.44		920	1803
6	B	Oleksiy Kasyanov	Ukraine	7.23	7.43	x	7.43		918	1826
7	B	Pieter Braun	Netherlands	7.40	7.17	x	7.40	=SB	910	1737
8	B	Fredrik Samuelsson	Sweden	7.30	x	7.19	7.30		886	1718
9	A	Mathias Brugger	Germany	x	7.08	7.22	7.22	SB	866	1691
10	B	Dominik Distelberger	Austria	7.20	x	x	7.20		862	1743
11	B	Hans van Alphen	Belgium	x	7.17	x	7.17		854	1630
12	A	Niels Pittomvils	Belgium	x	7.15	7.11	7.15		850	1671
13	B	René Stauß	Germany	6.92	7.15	7.04	7.15	SB	850	1624
14	A	Tim Nowak	Germany	6.85	6.83	7.11	7.11	SB	840	1650
15	A	Janek Õiglane	Estonia	5.74	6.96	7.10	7.10		838	1652
16	A	Kristjan Rosenberg	Estonia	x	7.08	6.70	7.08		833	1669
17	A	Adam Helcelet	Czech Republic	x	7.05	7.07	7.07		830	1675
18	A	Romain Barras	France	x	7.04	6.97	7.04		823	1642
19	B	Eelco Sintnicolaas	Netherlands	x	7.03	6.97	7.03		821	1657
20	A	Marcus Nilsson	Sweden	6.62	6.78	7.02	7.02	SB	818	1615
21	A	Marek Lukáš	Czech Republic	7.00	6.90	6.73	7.00	SB	814	1637
22	A	Florian Geffrouais	France	6.67	6.91	6.74	6.91		792	1587
23	B	Jiří Sýkora	Czech Republic	6.69	6.88	x	6.88		785	1612
24	A	Darko Pešić	Montenegro	6.82	6.73	6.58	6.82		771	1564
25	A	Jonas Fringeli	Switzerland	6.80	x	6.74	6.80		767	1584
	B	Paweł Wiesiołek	Poland	x	x	x	NM		0	876
	A	Lars Vikan Rise	Norway	x	x	x	NM		0	774

=== Shot put ===
Rank	Group	Name	Nationality	#1	#2	#3	Result	Notes	Points	Total
1	B	Hans van Alphen	Belgium	14.97	15.62	x	15.62	SB	828	2458
2	B	Romain Barras	France	15.54	15.08	15.35	15.54	SB	823	2465
3	B	Lars Vikan Rise	Norway	14.40	x	15.17	15.17		800	1574
4	B	Adam Helcelet	Czech Republic	x	14.43	14.94	14.94	SB	786	2461
5	B	Janek Õiglane	Estonia	14.56	14.68	x	14.68	SB	770	2422
6	B	Darko Pešić	Montenegro	14.17	14.65	14.51	14.65		768	2332
7	B	Martin Roe	Norway	13.94	14.58	x	14.58		764	2591
8	A	Tim Nowak	Germany	13.82	13.99	14.52	14.52	PB	760	2410
9	B	Oleksiy Kasyanov	Ukraine	14.28	14.51	14.44	14.51		760	2586
10	A	Eelco Sintnicolaas	Netherlands	14.06	14.44	14.47	14.47	SB	757	2414
11	B	Mathias Brugger	Germany	14.24	x	14.39	14.39		752	2443
12	B	René Stauß	Germany	12.92	14.39	x	14.39		752	2376
13	B	Florian Geffrouais	France	14.32	x	x	14.32		748	2335
14	A	Mihail Dudaš	Serbia	14.24	14.22	x	14.24	PB	743	2546
15	B	Marcus Nilsson	Sweden	13.98	14.15	13.63	14.15		738	2353
16	A	Fredrik Samuelsson	Sweden	13.68	13.99	13.44	13.99		728	2446
17	A	Pieter Braun	Netherlands	13.82	13.36	13.41	13.82		717	2454
18	A	Marek Lukáš	Czech Republic	x	13.16	13.81	13.81		717	2354
19	A	Niels Pittomvils	Belgium	13.79	13.69	x	13.79		715	2386
20	A	Ashley Bryant	Great Britain	13.25	13.67	13.74	13.74	=SB	712	2496
21	A	Kristjan Rosenberg	Estonia	12.70	13.74	13.26	13.74	PB	712	2381
22	A	Jorge Ureña	Spain	12.74	13.38	13.61	13.61	SB	704	2501
23	A	Thomas van der Plaetsen	Belgium	12.22	13.17	13.07	13.17		678	2458
24	A	Dominik Distelberger	Austria	12.86	13.05	12.90	13.05		670	2413
25	A	Jonas Fringeli	Switzerland	x	12.81	12.80	12.81		656	2240
	A	Paweł Wiesiołek	Poland	x	x	x	NM		0	876
	B	Jiří Sýkora	Czech Republic	x	x	x	NM		0	1612

=== High jump ===
Rank	Group	Name	Nationality	1.80	1.83	1.86	1.89	1.92	1.95	1.98	2.01	2.04	2.07	2.10	2.13	Result	Points	Notes	Total
1=	B	Thomas van der Plaetsen	Belgium	–	–	–	–	–	o	–	o	o	xxo	o	xxx	2.10	896	SB	3354
1=	B	Kristjan Rosenberg	Estonia	–	–	–	o	o	o	o	o	o	xo	xxo	xxx	2.10	896		3277
3	B	Fredrik Samuelsson	Sweden	–	–	o	–	o	o	o	o	xxo	o	xxx		2.07	868	PB	3314
4	B	Jorge Ureña	Spain	–	–	o	–	o	–	xo	o	xxo	xxx			2.04	840	SB	3341
5	B	Mihail Dudaš	Serbia	–	–	o	–	xxo	o	xxo	o	xxx				2.01	813	SB	3359
6	A	Pieter Braun	Netherlands	–	–	–	o	o	xo	o	xxo	xxx				2.01	813	SB	3267
7	A	Romain Barras	France	–	–	–	o	o	o	o	xxx					1.98	785	SB	3250
7	B	Janek Õiglane	Estonia	–	–	–	–	o	–	o	xxx					1.98	785		3207
7	B	Mathias Brugger	Germany	–	–	–	–	o	–	o	xxx					1.98	785		3228
7	B	Hans van Alphen	Belgium	–	–	o	o	o	o	o	xxx					1.98	785		3243
11	B	Oleksiy Kasyanov	Ukraine	–	–	–	xo	o	o	o	xxx					1.98	785		3371
12	B	René Stauß	Germany	–	–	o	–	xxo	–	o	–	xxx				1.98	785		3161
12	A	Marcus Nilsson	Sweden	–	–	xo	o	xo	o	o	xxx					1.98	785	SB	3138
14	A	Niels Pittomvils	Belgium	–	–	–	o	o	xxo	xo	xxx					1.98	785		3171
15	A	Jonas Fringeli	Switzerland	–	–	o	–	o	o	xxo	xxx					1.98	785		3025
15	B	Lars Vikan Rise	Norway	–	–	–	o	–	o	xxo	xxx					1.98	785		2359
17	B	Adam Helcelet	Czech Republic	–	–	–	o	o	o	xxx						1.95	758		3219
18	A	Tim Nowak	Germany	–	–	–	o	–	xo	xxx						1.95	758	SB	3168
19	A	Marek Lukáš	Czech Republic	xo	o	o	o	xxo	xxx							1.92	731	=SB	3085
20	A	Ashley Bryant	Great Britain	–	xo	–	o	xxx								1.89	705		3201
21	A	Martin Roe	Norway	o	o	o	xxo	xxx								1.89	705		3296
22	A	Eelco Sintnicolaas	Netherlands	o	xo	xxo	xxo	xxx								1.89	705		3119
23	A	Dominik Distelberger	Austria	–	–	o	xxx									1.86	679		3092
23	A	Darko Pešić	Montenegro	–	o	o	–	xxx								1.86	679		3011
25	A	Florian Geffrouais	France	xxo	xxx											1.80	627		2962
	A	Jiří Sýkora	Czech Republic													DNS	0		DNF
	B	Paweł Wiesiołek	Poland													DNS	0		DNF

=== 400 metres ===
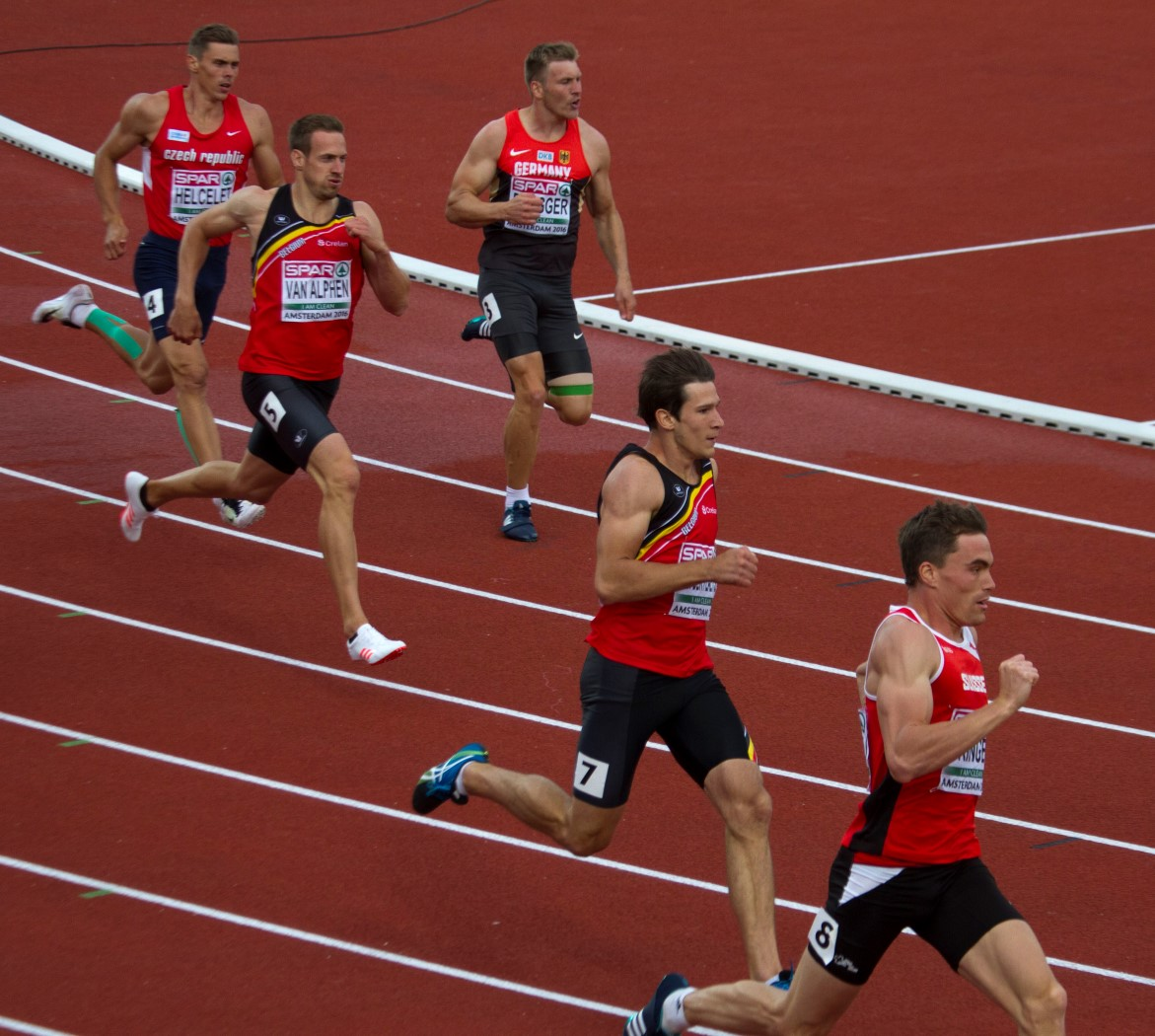
Heat 3

Rank	Heat	Name	Nationality	Time	Notes	Points	Total
1	4	Oleksiy Kasyanov	Ukraine	48.97		863	4234
2	4	Mihail Dudaš	Serbia	49.45		840	4199
3	3	Mathias Brugger	Germany	49.76		826	4054
4	4	Pieter Braun	Netherlands	49.78		825	4092
5	3	Jonas Fringeli	Switzerland	49.95		817	3842
6	2	Niels Pittomvils	Belgium	50.01	SB	814	3985
7	2	Jorge Ureña	Spain	50.07		811	4152
8	2	Martin Roe	Norway	50.13		809	4105
9	4	Ashley Bryant	Great Britain	50.15		808	4009
10	3	Florian Geffrouais	France	50.34		799	3761
11	3	Adam Helcelet	Czech Republic	50.36		798	4017
12	4	Eelco Sintnicolaas	Netherlands	50.41		796	3915
13	3	Thomas van der Plaetsen	Belgium	50.50		792	4146
14	4	Romain Barras	France	50.57		789	4039
15	1	Kristjan Rosenberg	Estonia	50.61		787	4064
16	2	Tim Nowak	Germany	50.89		774	3942
17	2	Marcus Nilsson	Sweden	50.93	SB	772	3910
18	2	Fredrik Samuelsson	Sweden	51.02		768	4082
19	1	Marek Lukáš	Czech Republic	51.42		750	3835
19	3	Hans van Alphen	Belgium	51.42		750	3993
21	1	Lars Vikan Rise	Norway	51.45		749	3108
22	1	Janek Õiglane	Estonia	51.48		748	3955
23	1	René Stauß	Germany	52.08		721	3882
	1	Darko Pešić	Montenegro	DNS		0	DNF
	4	Dominik Distelberger	Austria	DNS		0	DNF

=== 110 metres hurdles ===
Rank	Heat	Name	Nationality	Time	Notes	Points	Total
1	3	Oleksiy Kasyanov	Ukraine	13.93	CB	984	5218
2	3	Jorge Ureña	Spain	13.95	PB	981	5133
3	3	Pieter Braun	Netherlands	14.49		912	5004
4	3	Adam Helcelet	Czech Republic	14.49		912	4929
5	3	Mihail Dudaš	Serbia	14.55		905	5104
6	3	Thomas van der Plaetsen	Belgium	14.64		894	5040
7	2	Fredrik Samuelsson	Sweden	14.65		892	4974
8	2	Romain Barras	France	14.66		891	4930
9	3	Ashley Bryant	Great Britain	14.68		889	4898
10	2	Jonas Fringeli	Switzerland	14.70		886	4728
11	3	Marek Lukáš	Czech Republic	14.82		871	4706
12	1	Marcus Nilsson	Sweden	14.97		853	4763
13	2	Mathias Brugger	Germany	14.99		851	4905
14	1	Kristjan Rosenberg	Estonia	15.54		785	4849
15	1	René Stauß	Germany	15.63		775	4657
16	1	Martin Roe	Norway	16.04		728	4833
17	2	Eelco Sintnicolaas	Netherlands	16.24		706	4621
18	2	Janek Õiglane	Estonia	16.47		681	4636
	1	Florian Geffrouais	France	DNF		0	3761
	2	Tim Nowak	Germany	DNF		0	3942
	2	Niels Pittomvils	Belgium	DNF		0	3985
	1	Hans van Alphen	Belgium	DNS		0	DNF
	1	Lars Vikan Rise	Norway	DNS		0	DNF

=== Discus throw ===
Rank	Group	Name	Nationality	#1	#2	#3	Result	Notes	Points	Total
1	A	Martin Roe	Norway	43.29	47.74	x	47.74	PB	823	5656
2	B	Adam Helcelet	Czech Republic	44.61	45.02	47.12	47.12	PB	811	5740
3	B	Mihail Dudaš	Serbia	44.28	45.65	45.14	45.65		780	5884
4	B	Marcus Nilsson	Sweden	39.00	40.28	45.31	45.31	SB	773	5536
5	A	Janek Õiglane	Estonia	43.97	44.62	x	44.62	PB	759	5395
6	B	René Stauß	Germany	42.52	43.18	44.33	44.33	SB	753	5410
7	B	Thomas van der Plaetsen	Belgium	42.90	43.80	44.32	44.32		753	5793
8	B	Romain Barras	France	43.49	42.89	43.88	43.88		744	5674
9	A	Ashley Bryant	Great Britain	42.85	42.98	43.62	43.62	SB	738	5636
10	A	Mathias Brugger	Germany	42.79	x	x	42.79		721	5626
11	A	Oleksiy Kasyanov	Ukraine	38.79	42.46	x	42.46		715	5933
12	B	Florian Geffrouais	France	42.20	x	x	42.20		709	4470
13	B	Eelco Sintnicolaas	Netherlands	41.69	41.04	41.94	41.94	SB	704	5325
14	B	Pieter Braun	Netherlands	40.79	40.34	40.90	40.90		683	5687
15	B	Niels Pittomvils	Belgium	x	x	40.42	40.42		673	4658
16	A	Jonas Fringeli	Switzerland	39.71	x	40.39	40.39		672	5400
17	A	Fredrik Samuelsson	Sweden	36.45	39.14	39.50	39.50	SB	654	5628
18	A	Marek Lukáš	Czech Republic	33.44	37.36	39.38	39.38		652	5358
19	A	Kristjan Rosenberg	Estonia	35.32	x	32.12	35.32		570	5419
20	A	Tim Nowak	Germany	x	x	27.68	27.68		419	4361
	A	Jorge Ureña	Spain	x	x	x	NM		0	5133

=== Pole vault ===
Rank	Group	Name	Nationality	4.10	4.20	4.30	4.40	4.50	4.60	4.70	4.80	4.90	5.00	5.10	5.20	5.30	5.40	5.50	Result	Points	Notes	Total
1	B	Thomas van der Plaetsen	Belgium	–	–	–	–	–	–	–	–	–	o	–	o	xxo	xo	xxx	5.40	1035		6828
2	B	Eelco Sintnicolaas	Netherlands	–	–	–	–	–	–	–	–	–	xo	–	xo	xo	xxx		5.30	1004	SB	6329
3	A	Jorge Ureña	Spain	–	–	–	–	–	o	–	o	–	xxo	xxx					5.00	910	PB	6043
4	B	Adam Helcelet	Czech Republic	–	–	–	o	xo	o	xo	o	o	xxx						4.90	880	SB	6620
5	B	Florian Geffrouais	France	–	–	–	–	xxo	–	o	xo	xo	xxx						4.90	880		5350
6	A	Janek Õiglane	Estonia	–	–	–	o	o	o	o	xo	xxx							4.80	849	=PB	6244
7	A	Jonas Fringeli	Switzerland	–	–	–	–	o	xo	o	xo	xxx							4.80	849	=PB	6249
7	A	Oleksiy Kasyanov	Ukraine	–	–	–	xo	–	o	o	xo	xxx							4.80	849	=SB	6782
7	B	Romain Barras	France	–	–	–	–	xo	–	o	xo	xxx							4.80	849	=SB	6523
10	A	Kristjan Rosenberg	Estonia	–	–	–	–	o	o	o	xxx								4.70	819		6238
11	A	Fredrik Samuelsson	Sweden	–	o	–	o	xo	o	o	xxx								4.70	819	SB	6447
12	A	Mathias Brugger	Germany	–	–	–	–	–	–	xo	xxx								4.70	819		6445
12	B	Mihail Dudaš	Serbia	–	–	–	–	o	o	xo	xxx								4.70	819		6703
14	B	Pieter Braun	Netherlands	–	–	–	–	–	o	–	xxx								4.60	790		6477
15	A	Ashley Bryant	Great Britain	–	o	–	o	xxo	o	xxx									4.60	790	SB	6426
16	A	Tim Nowak	Germany	–	–	–	–	–	xo	xxx									4.60	790		5151
17	B	Marcus Nilsson	Sweden	–	–	–	o	–	xxo	xxx									4.60	790		6326
18	A	Martin Roe	Norway	o	o	o	o	o	xxx										4.50	760		6416
19	A	Marek Lukáš	Czech Republic	–	–	xo	xxx												4.30	702		6060
	B	René Stauß	Germany	–	–	–	xxx												NM	0		5410
	B	Niels Pittomvils	Belgium																DNS	0		DNF

=== Javelin throw ===
Rank	Group	Name	Nationality	#1	#2	#3	Result	Notes	Points	Total
1	A	Ashley Bryant	Great Britain	68.23	69.19	70.37	70.37	SB	895	7321
2	B	Janek Õiglane	Estonia	60.53	62.21	67.41	67.41	SB	850	7094
3	B	Adam Helcelet	Czech Republic	63.38	65.58	67.24	67.24	PB	847	7467
4	A	Marek Lukáš	Czech Republic	65.36	66.81	64.18	66.81		841	6901
5	A	Marcus Nilsson	Sweden	62.58	64.01	63.16	64.01	PB	798	7124
6	A	Kristjan Rosenberg	Estonia	57.46	58.34	61.65	61.65	PB	763	7001
7	A	Tim Nowak	Germany	53.99	56.54	60.94	60.94	PB	752	5903
8	B	Romain Barras	France	54.68	59.63	58.46	59.63	SB	732	7255
9	A	Fredrik Samuelsson	Sweden	58.44	x	x	58.44	SB	714	7161
10	B	Mihail Dudaš	Serbia	54.82	55.33	58.19	58.19		711	7414
11	A	René Stauß	Germany	57.66	56.20	53.20	57.66	SB	703	6113
12	A	Mathias Brugger	Germany	50.90	51.87	57.35	57.35	PB	698	7143
13	B	Eelco Sintnicolaas	Netherlands	57.24	r		57.24		696	7025
14	B	Thomas van der Plaetsen	Belgium	57.23	53.92	x	57.23		696	7524
15	A	Martin Roe	Norway	57.14	55.96	x	57.14		695	7111
16	A	Pieter Braun	Netherlands	52.15	56.86	54.03	56.86	SB	691	7168
17	B	Florian Geffrouais	France	52.43	51.05	50.60	52.43		625	5975
18	B	Jorge Ureña	Spain	49.44	52.26	x	52.26		622	6665
19	B	Jonas Fringeli	Switzerland	50.61	x	x	50.61		598	6847
20	B	Oleksiy Kasyanov	Ukraine	x	48.23	x	48.23		562	7344

=== 1500 metres ===
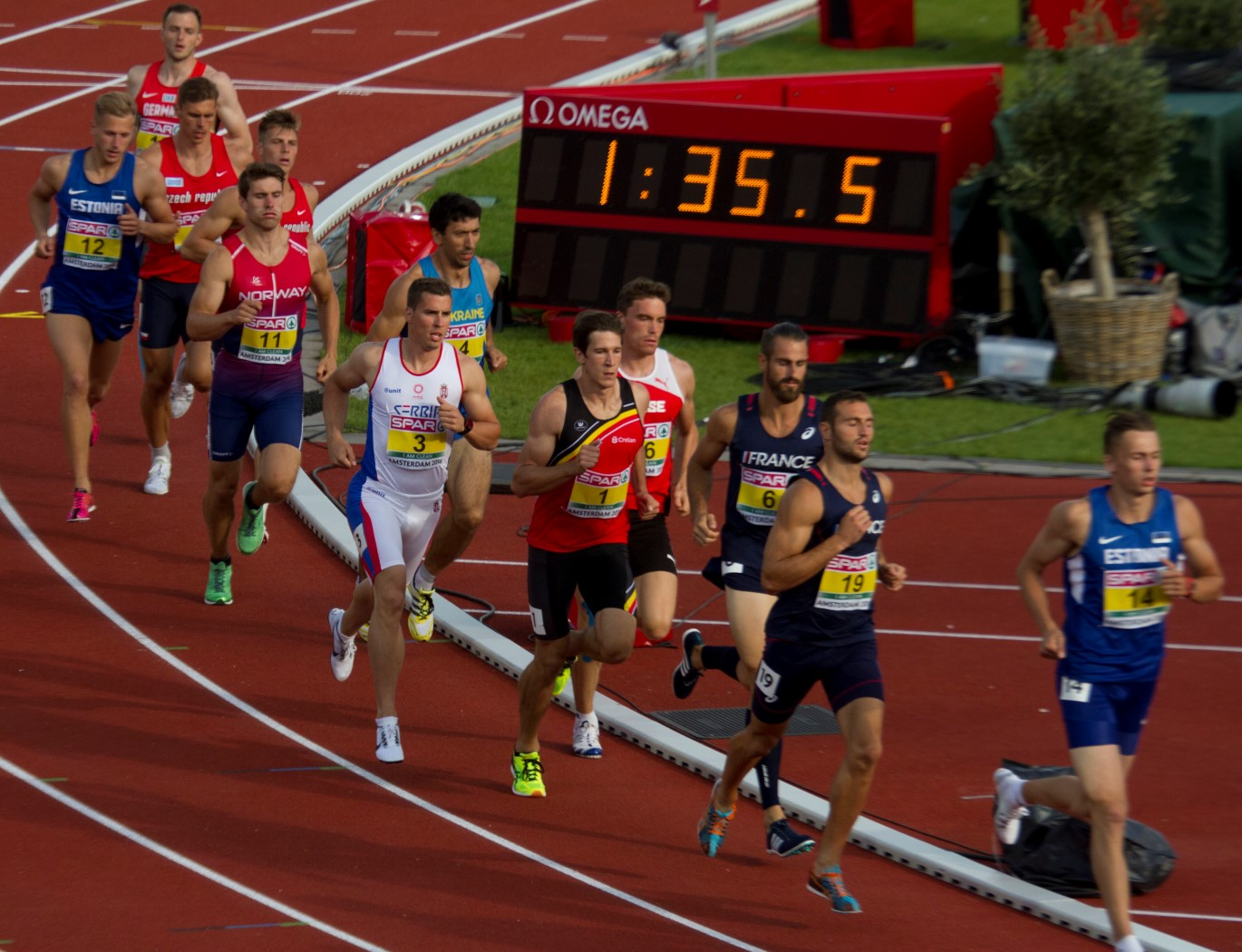
1500 metres underway

Rank	Name	Nationality	Time	Notes	Points	Total
1	Marcus Nilsson	Sweden	4:19.12	SB	818	7942
2	Pieter Braun	Netherlands	4:25.12	PB	777	7945
3	Jonas Fringeli	Switzerland	4:28.46		755	7602
4	Florian Geffrouais	France	4:29.50		748	6723
5	Romain Barras	France	4:29.59	SB	747	8002
6	Mathias Brugger	Germany	4:30.24		743	7886
7	Tim Nowak	Germany	4:30.32		743	6646
8	Mihail Dudaš	Serbia	4:30.90	SB	739	8153
9	Kristjan Rosenberg	Estonia	4:31.12	PB	737	7738
10	Oleksiy Kasyanov	Ukraine	4:32.56		728	8072
11	Marek Lukáš	Czech Republic	4:33.10	SB	724	7625
12	Ashley Bryant	Great Britain	4:33.88		719	8040
13	Fredrik Samuelsson	Sweden	4:34.78	SB	714	7875
14	Thomas van der Plaetsen	Belgium	4:37.84		694	8218
15	Adam Helcelet	Czech Republic	4:38.39	SB	690	8157
16	Martin Roe	Norway	4:39.44		684	7795
17	Janek Õiglane	Estonia	4:42.01		668	7762
18	René Stauß	Germany	4:49.09		624	6737
	Eelco Sintnicolaas	Netherlands	DNF		0	7025
	Jorge Ureña	Spain	DNS		0	DNF

=== Final standings ===
Rank	Name	Nationality	Points	Notes
1st place, gold medalist(s)	Thomas van der Plaetsen	Belgium	8218	
2nd place, silver medalist(s)	Adam Helcelet	Czech Republic	8157	SB
3rd place, bronze medalist(s)	Mihail Dudaš	Serbia	8153	
4	Oleksiy Kasyanov	Ukraine	8072	
5	Ashley Bryant	Great Britain	8040	
6	Romain Barras	France	8002	
7	Pieter Braun	Netherlands	7945	
8	Marcus Nilsson	Sweden	7942	SB
9	Mathias Brugger	Germany	7886	
10	Fredrik Samuelsson	Sweden	7875	SB
11	Martin Roe	Norway	7795	
12	Janek Õiglane	Estonia	7762	SB
13	Kristjan Rosenberg	Estonia	7738	
14	Marek Lukáš	Czech Republic	7625	
15	Jonas Fringeli	Switzerland	7602	
16	Eelco Sintnicolaas	Netherlands	7025	
17	René Stauß	Germany	6737	
18	Florian Geffrouais	France	6723	
19	Tim Nowak	Germany	6646	
	Jorge Ureña	Spain	DNF	
	Niels Pittomvils	Belgium	DNF	
	Lars Vikan Rise	Norway	DNF	
	Hans van Alphen	Belgium	DNF	
	Dominik Distelberger	Austria	DNF	
	Darko Pešić	Montenegro	DNF	
	Paweł Wiesiołek	Poland	DNF	
	Jiří Sýkora	Czech Republic	DNF	
	Mikk Pahapill	Estonia	DNS	
