= Cedric Nolf =

Belgian athletics competitor

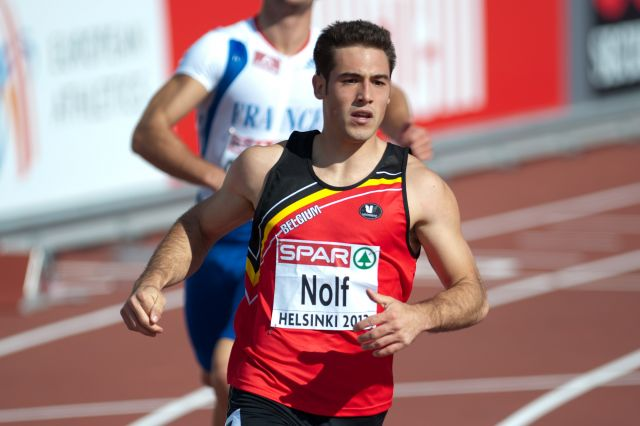
- Cedric Nolf in 2012

Personal information
- Born: 18 June 1989 (age 37) Kortrijk, Belgium
- Education: Ghent University

Sport
- Sport: Track and field
- Event(s): Long jump, decathlon

Cedric Nolf (born 18 June 1989 in Kortrijk) is a Belgian athlete specialising in the long jump. Earlier in his career he competed in the decathlon.

His personal bests in the long jump are 7.89 metres outdoors (2014) and 7.91 metres indoors (2015).

== Competition record ==
Year	Competition	Venue	Position	Event	Notes
Representing Belgium
2011	European U23 Championships	Ostrava, Czech Republic	9th	Decathlon	7640 pts
2011	Universiade	Shenzhen, China	4th	Decathlon	7818 pts
2012	European Championships	Helsinki, Finland	–	Decathlon	DNF
2015	European Indoor Championships	Prague, Czech Republic	9th (q)	Long jump	7.78 m
2015	Universiade	Gwangju, South Korea	6th	Long jump	7.83 m (w)

== Personal bests ==
Outdoor

- 100 metres – 10.93 (+0.8 m/s) (Helsinki 2012)
- 400 metres – 49.74 (Helsinki 2012)
- 1500 metres – 4:51.14 (Herentals 2011)
- 110 metres hurdles – 14.69 (+0.4 m/s) (Götzis 2012)
- High jump – 1.95 (Shenzhen 2011)
- Pole vault – 4.90 (Ostrava 2011)
- Long jump – 7.89 (+1.2 m/s) (Kortrijk 2014)
- Shot put – 14.21 (Desenzano del Garda 2012)
- Discus throw – 41.60 (Ostrava 2011)
- Javelin throw – 66.94 (Desenzano del Garda 2011)
- Decathlon – 7818 (Shenzhen 2011)

Indoor

- 60 metres – 7.03 (Ghent 2014)
- 1000 metres – 2:53.85 (Ghent 2012)
- 60 metres hurdles – 8.17 (Ghent 2012)
- High jump – 1.87 (Ghent 2012)
- Pole vault – 4.80 (Ghent 2012)
- Long jump – 7.91 (Ghent 2015)
- Shot put – 14.20 (Ghent 2013)
- Heptathlon – 5669 (Ghent 2012)
