= Dominik Distelberger =

Austrian decathlete

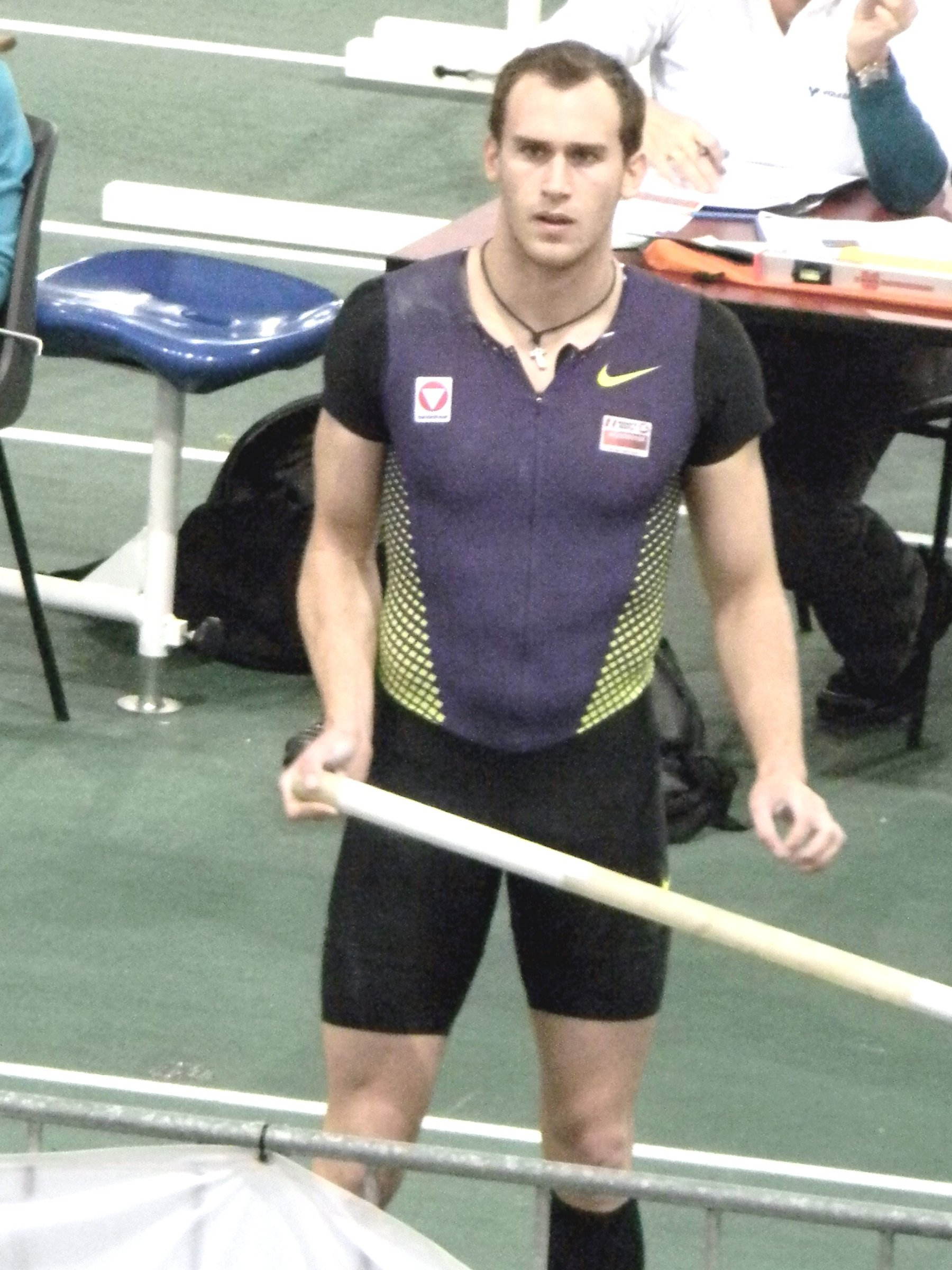
- Dominik Distelberger in 2012

Personal information
- Born: 16 March 1990 (age 36) Scheibbs, Austria
- Height: 1.86 m (6 ft 1 in)
- Weight: 79 kg (174 lb)

Sport
- Sport: Athletics
- Event(s): Decathlon, heptathlon
- Club: UVB Purgstall
- Coached by: Herwig Grünsteidl

Dominik Distelberger (born 16 March 1990) is a retired Austrian athlete who competed in the decathlon.

In 2014, he was awarded the Austrian Athletics Federation Athlete of the Year.

He represented his country at the 2016 Summer Olympics in Rio de Janeiro finishing 19th, as well as the 2017 World Championships in London finishing 17th.

In May 2022, Distelberger retired from the decathlon.

== International competitions ==
Year	Competition	Venue	Position	Event	Notes
Representing Austria
2007	European Youth Olympic Festival	Belgrade, Serbia	13th (sf)	200 m	22.39 s
2007	European Youth Olympic Festival	Belgrade, Serbia	2nd	110 m hurdles (99 cm)	13.85 s
2007	World Youth Championships	Ostrava, Czech Republic	30th (h)	200 m	22.33 s
2007	World Youth Championships	Ostrava, Czech Republic	10th	Octathlon	5830 pts
2008	World Junior Championships	Bydgoszcz, Poland	41st (h)	110 m hurdles (99 cm)	14.52 s
2008	World Junior Championships	Bydgoszcz, Poland	15th (h)	4 × 100 m relay	40.80 s
2009	European Junior Championships	Novi Sad, Serbia	6th	Decathlon (junior)	7396 pts
2010	Hypo-Meeting	Götzis, Austria	16th	Decathlon	7604 pts
2011	European Indoor Championships	Paris, France	15th	Heptathlon	4135 pts
2011	Hypo-Meeting	Götzis, Austria	14th	Decathlon	7840 pts
2011	European U23 Championships	Ostrava, Czech Republic	7th	Decathlon	7735 pts
2012	Hypo-Meeting	Götzis, Austria	16th	Decathlon	6926 pts
2012	European Championships	Helsinki, Finland	15th	Decathlon	7611 pts
2013	European Indoor Championships	Gothenburg, Sweden	11th	Heptathlon	5623 pts
2014	European Championships	Zürich, Switzerland	12th	Decathlon	7942 pts
2016	European Championships	Amsterdam, Netherlands	–	Decathlon	DNF
2016	Olympic Games	Rio de Janeiro, Brazil	19th	Decathlon	7954 pts
2017	European Indoor Championships	Belgrade, Serbia	4th	Heptathlon	6063 pts
2017	World Championships	London, United Kingdom	17th	Decathlon	7857 pts
2018	World Indoor Championships	Birmingham, United Kingdom	8th	Heptathlon	5908 pts
2018	European Championships	Berlin, Germany	–	Decathlon	DNF

== Personal bests ==
Information from World Athletics profile unless otherwise noted.

=== Outdoor ===
As of 24 June 2025

Event	Performance	Location	Date	Points
Decathlon	—N/a	Götzis	28–29 May 2016	8,175 points
100 meters	10.54 (+1.6 m/s)	Ostrava	14 July 2011	966 points
Long jump	7.74 m (25 ft 4 1/2 in) (+1.0 m/s)	Villach	10 July 2010	995 points
Shot put	13.76 m (45 ft 1 1/2 in)	Götzis	28 May 2016	714 points
High jump	2.00 m (6 ft 6 1/2 in)	Götzis	31 May 2014	8.03 points
400 meters	47.25	Götzis	29 May 2010	946 points
110 meters hurdles	14.19 (+0.3 m/s)	Paris	1 July 2017	950 points
Discus throw	45.65 m (149 ft 9 in)	Vienna	25 August 2015	780 points
Pole vault	5.10 m (16 ft 8 3/4 in)	Belgrade	5 March 2017	941 points
Javelin throw	61.83 m (202 ft 10 1/4 in)	Rio de Janeiro	18 August 2016	765 points
1500 meters	4:27.10	Ratingen	20 June 2010	764 points
Virtual Best Performance				8,624 points

Event	Performance	Location	Date
200 meters	21.41 (-0.3 m/s)	Villach	11 July 2010
300 meters	34.58	Wehrheim	27 April 2014

=== Indoor ===
As of 24 June 2025

Event	Performance	Location	Date	Points
Heptathlon	—N/a	Belgrade	4–5 March 2017	6,063 points
60 meters	6.83	Vienna	20 February 2010	944 points
Long jump	7.59 m (24 ft 10 3/4 in)	Linz	25 February 2012	957 points
Shot put	13.70 m (44 ft 11 1/4 in)	Vienna	23 January 2016	710 points
High jump	2.02 m (6 ft 7 1/2 in)	Vienna	20 February 2010	822 points
60 meters hurdles	7.80	Belgrade	5 March 2017	1,033 points
Pole vault	5.10 m (16 ft 8 3/4 in)	Belgrade	5 March 2017	941 points
1000 meters	2:41.01	Tallinn	4 February 2018	862 points
Virtual Best Performance				6,269 points
