= Marcus Nilsson (decathlete) =

Swedish decathlete (born 1991)

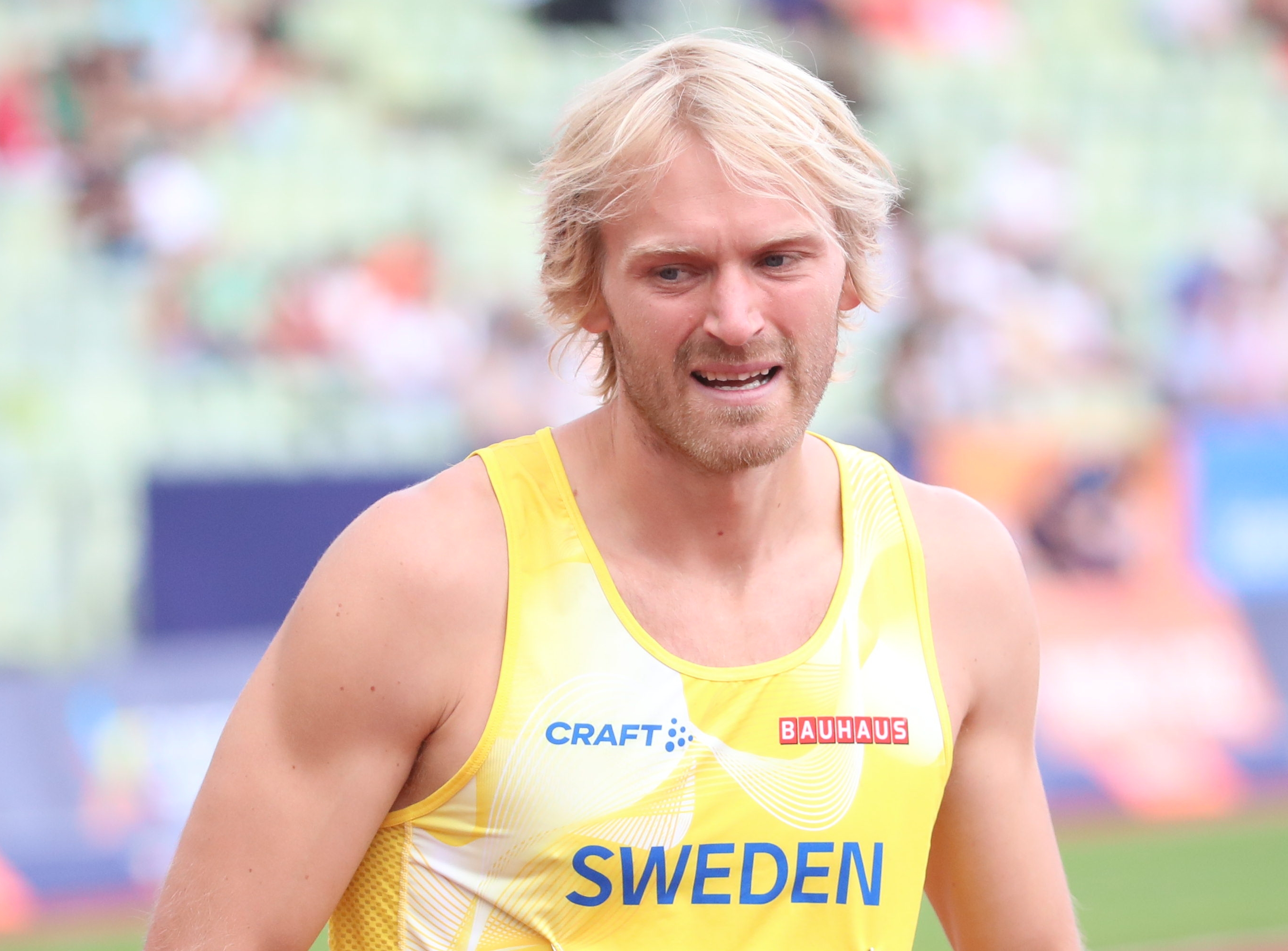
- Nilsson in 2022

Personal information
- Nationality: Swedish
- Born: 3 May 1991 (age 35) Malmö

Sport
- Country: Sweden
- Sport: Track and field
- Event: Decathlon

Marcus Nilsson (born 3 May 1991 in Malmö) is a Swedish decathlete. He competed at the 2013 World Championships in Moscow, Russia.

Nilsson hails from Kalmar. He grew up in a sports family where both his father Carl-Gustaf ”Calle” and mother Katarina competed at an elite level. His brother David and two sisters, Ida and Johanna, have belonged to the Swedish national team in athletics. At the 2002 Swedish cross country championships the family walked home with four gold medals, one silver and one bronze.

== Competition record ==
| Year | Competition | Venue | Position | Event | Notes |
Representing Sweden
| 2009 | European Junior Championships | Novi Sad, Serbia | 20th | Decathlon (junior) | 6915 pts |
| 2010 | World Junior Championships | Moncton, Canada | 3rd | Decathlon (junior) | 7751 pts |
| 2011 | European U23 Championships | Ostrava, Czech Republic | 16th | Decathlon | 7141 pts |
| 2012 | European Championships | Helsinki, Finland | 18th | Decathlon | 7164 pts |
| 2013 | World Championships | Moscow, Russia | 24th | Decathlon | 7540 pts |
| 2014 | European Championships | Zürich, Switzerland | – | Decathlon | DNF |
| 2016 | European Championships | Amsterdam, Netherlands | 8th | Decathlon | 7942 pts |
| 2018 | European Championships | Berlin, Germany | 12th | Decathlon | 7819 pts |
| 2022 | World Championships | Eugene, United States | – | Decathlon | DNF |
| 2022 | European Championships | Munich, Germany | 4th | Decathlon | 8327 pts |
| 2023 | European Indoor Championships | Istanbul, Turkey | 8th | Heptathlon | 5677 pts |
| 2023 | World Championships | Budapest, Hungary | — | Decathlon | DNF |
