= Florian Geffrouais =

French athletics competitor

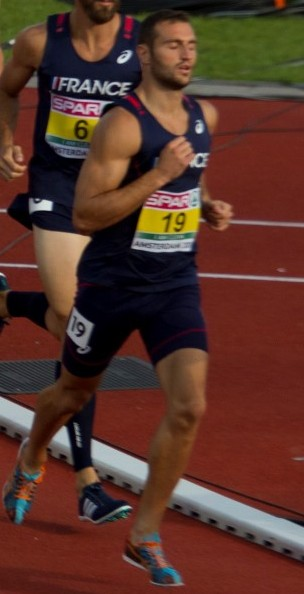
- Florian Geffrouais in 2016

Personal information
- Born: 5 December 1988 (age 37) Saint-Lô, France
- Height: 1.86 m (6 ft 1 in)
- Weight: 83 kg (183 lb)

Sport
- Sport: Athletics
- Event(s): Decathlon, heptathlon

Florian Geffrouais (born 5 December 1988 in Saint-Lô) is a French athlete competing in the decathlon. He represented his country at four consecutive European Championships.

== International competitions ==
Year	Competition	Venue	Position	Event	Notes
Representing France and New Caledonia
2007	European Junior Championships	Hengelo, Netherlands	20th	Decathlon (junior)	6555 pts
2010	European Championships	Barcelona, Spain	16th	Decathlon	7706 pts
2011	European Indoor Championships	Paris, France	12th	Heptathlon	5795 pts
2011	Universiade	Shenzhen, China	12th	Decathlon	7179 pts
2012	European Championships	Helsinki, Finland	–	Decathlon	DNF
2014	European Championships	Zürich, Switzerland	13th	Decathlon	7900 pts
2016	European Championships	Amsterdam, Netherlands	18th	Decathlon	6723 pts
2017	Pacific Mini Games	Port Vila, Vanuatu	1st	Pole vault	4.00 m
2017	Pacific Mini Games	Port Vila, Vanuatu	1st	Decathlon	7354 pts

== Personal bests ==
Outdoor

- 100 metres – 11.07 (+1.1 m/s, Brussels 2012)
- 400 metres – 48.53 (Götzis 2013)
- 1500 metres – 4:13.95 (Aubagne 2012)
- 110 metres hurdles – 14.76 (+0.5 m/s, Cannes-la-Bocca 2013)
- High jump – 1.96 (Valence 2010)
- Pole vault – 5.05 (Nouméa 2012)
- Long jump – 7.25 (+1.2 m/s, Valence 2010)
- Shot put – 15.63 (Arona 2014)
- Discus throw – 47.65 (Angers 2012)
- Javelin throw – 64.61 (St Brieuc 2010)
- Decathlon – 8164 (Reims 2014)

Indoor

- 60 metres – 7.08 (Reims 2011)
- 1000 metres – 2:37.49 (Reims 2011)
- 60 metres hurdles – 8.31 (Aubière 2011)
- High jump – 1.95 (Bompas 2014)
- Pole vault – 5.00 (Paris 2011)
- Long jump – 6.98 (Paris 2011)
- Shot put – 15.39 (Bompas 2014)
- Heptathlon – 5795 (Paris 2011)
