= Mikalai Shubianok =

Belarusian decathlete

Mikalai Shubianok (Belarusian: Мікалай Шубянок; born 4 May 1985 in Gomel) is a decathlete from Belarus. He set his personal best score (8028 points) in the men's decathlon on 19 May 2007 in Minsk. His first name is sometimes also spelled as Nikolay.

== Achievements ==
Year	Competition	Venue	Position	Event	Notes
Representing Belarus
2004	World Junior Championships	Grosseto, Italy	—	Decathlon (junior)	DNF
2007	Universiade	Bangkok, Thailand	5th	Decathlon	7721 pts
2008	Hypo-Meeting	Götzis, Austria	11th	Decathlon	7884 pts
2008	Olympic Games	Beijing, China	16th	Decathlon	7906 pts
2009	Universiade	Belgrade, Serbia	1st	Decathlon	7960 pts
2011	Universiade	Shenzhen, China	6th	Decathlon	7620 pts
2012	European Championships	Helsinki, Finland	9th	Decathlon	7948 pts (SB)
