= Gaël Querin =

French decathlete (born 1987)

Gaël Quérin
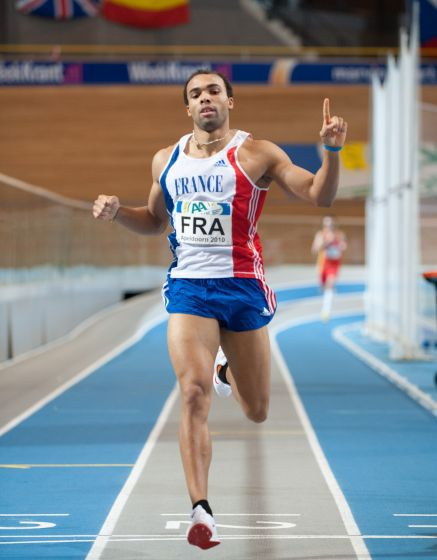

Personal information
- Nationality: French
- Born: 26 June 1987 (age 39) Lille, France
- Height: 1.87 m (6 ft 2 in)
- Weight: 82 kg (181 lb)

Sport
- Sport: Athletics
- Event: Decathlon
Medal record
Representing France
Men's athletics
Universiade
Silver medal – second place	2011 Shenzhen	Decathlon

Gaël Quérin (born 26 June 1987 in Lille) is a French athlete competing in the decathlon.

== Competition record ==
Year	Competition	Venue	Position	Event	Notes
Representing France
2006	World Junior Championships	Beijing, China	13th	Decathlon (junior)	7292 pts
2009	European Indoor Championships	Turin, Italy	8th	Heptathlon	5886 pts
2009	European U23 Championships	Kaunas, Lithuania	12th	Decathlon	7463 pts
2009	Jeux de la Francophonie	Beirut, Lebanon	4th	Decathlon	7488 pts
2011	Universiade	Shenzhen, China	2nd	Decathlon	7857 pts
2012	European Championships	Helsinki, Finland	5th	Decathlon	8098 pts
2014	European Championships	Zürich, Switzerland	9th	Decathlon	8194 pts
2015	European Indoor Championships	Prague, Czech Republic	4th	Heptathlon	6115 pts

== Personal bests ==
Outdoor
- 100 m – 11.12 (0.7 m/s) (Shenzhen 2011)
- 400 m – 47.84 (Toruń 2011)
- 1500 m – 4:10.47 (Toruń 2011)
- 110 m hurdles – 14.34 (0.3 m/s) (Montreuil-sous-Bois 2007)
- 400 metres hurdles – 52.47 (Dreux 2006)
- High jump – 2.00 m (Götzis 2012)
- Pole vault – 5.00 m (Helsinki 2012)
- Long jump – 7.56 m (0.4 m/s) (Helsinki 2012)
- Shot put – 13.37 m (Kladno 2011)
- Discus throw – 41.04 m (Arras 2009)
- Javelin throw – 56.77 m (Villeneuve-d'Ascq 2007)
- Decathlon – 8098 pts (Helsinki 2012)
Indoor
- 60 m – 7.09 (Eaubonne 2008)
- 400 m – 48.86 (Liévin 2011)
- 1000 m – 2:33.49 (Paris 2010)
- 60 m hurdles – 7.98 (Liévin 2009)
- High jump – 2.01 m (Aubière 2011)
- Pole vault – 4.80 m (Torino 2009)
- Long jump – 7.49 m (Aubière 2011)
- Shot put – 13.10 m (Aubière 2011)
- Heptathlon – 5923 pts (Aubière 2011)
