= Vasiliy Kharlamov =

Russian decathlete

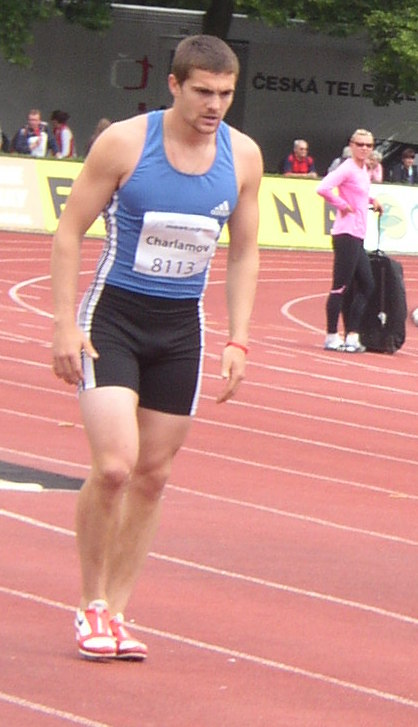
Vasiliy Kharlamov at the 2010 TNT - Fortuna Meeting in Kladno

Vasiliy Olegovich Kharlamov (Russian: Василий Олегович Харламов; born 8 January 1986) is a Russian decathlete. In May 2023 he was found guilty of a doping offence dating back to 12 October 2012. Accordingly, his results from that date have been changed to disqualifications, and he was suspended for four years from May 2023.

== Achievements ==
Year	Competition	Venue	Position	Event	Notes
Representing Russia
2007	European U23 Championships	Debrecen, Hungary	7th	Decathlon	7681 pts
2009	World Championships	Berlin, Germany	17th	Decathlon	8065 pts
2010	European Championships	Barcelona, Spain	13th	Decathlon	7844 pts
2011	European Indoor Championships	Paris, France	8th	Heptathlon	5959 pts
2011	Universiade	Shenzhen, China	1st	Decathlon	8166 pts
2012	European Championships	Helsinki, Finland	DNF	Decathlon	-
