= Hashim Al-Sharfa =

Saudi Arabian sprinter

Personal information
- Nationality: Saudi Arabian
- Born: 28 December 1972 (age 53)

Sport
- Sport: Sprinting
- Event: 4 × 400 metres relay

Hashim Al-Sharfa (Arabic: هاشم الشرفا; born 28 December 1972) is a Saudi Arabian sprinter. He competed in the men's 4 × 400 metres relay at the 1996 Summer Olympics.
