= Björn Barrefors =

Swedish decathlete

Bjorn Barrefors
- Born: October 27, 1987 (age 38); Uppsala, Sweden
- Occupation: Swedish decathlete

Björn Barrefors (born October 27, 1987, in Uppsala, Sweden) is a Swedish decathlete and heptathlete. He attended and competed for the University of Nebraska–Lincoln in Lincoln, Nebraska. Barrefors was a four time first team NCAA All-America athlete, gaining the honor twice in the outdoor decathlon (2009 and 2012) and twice for the indoor heptathlon (also in 2009 and 2012).

Barrefors was the University of Nebraska's 2013 male student-athlete of the year and is the only four-time academic Academic All-American in the institution of higher learning's history. Of those rare four academic all-American honors, he was a three-time first-team academic all-American with teammate and academic great Levi Gipson. Barrefors joins three others in this feat: Karen Jennings, Virginia Stahr, and Sarah Pavan. He graduated from the University on May 4, 2013, with a master's degree in computer science.
