= Mathias Brugger =

German track and field athlete

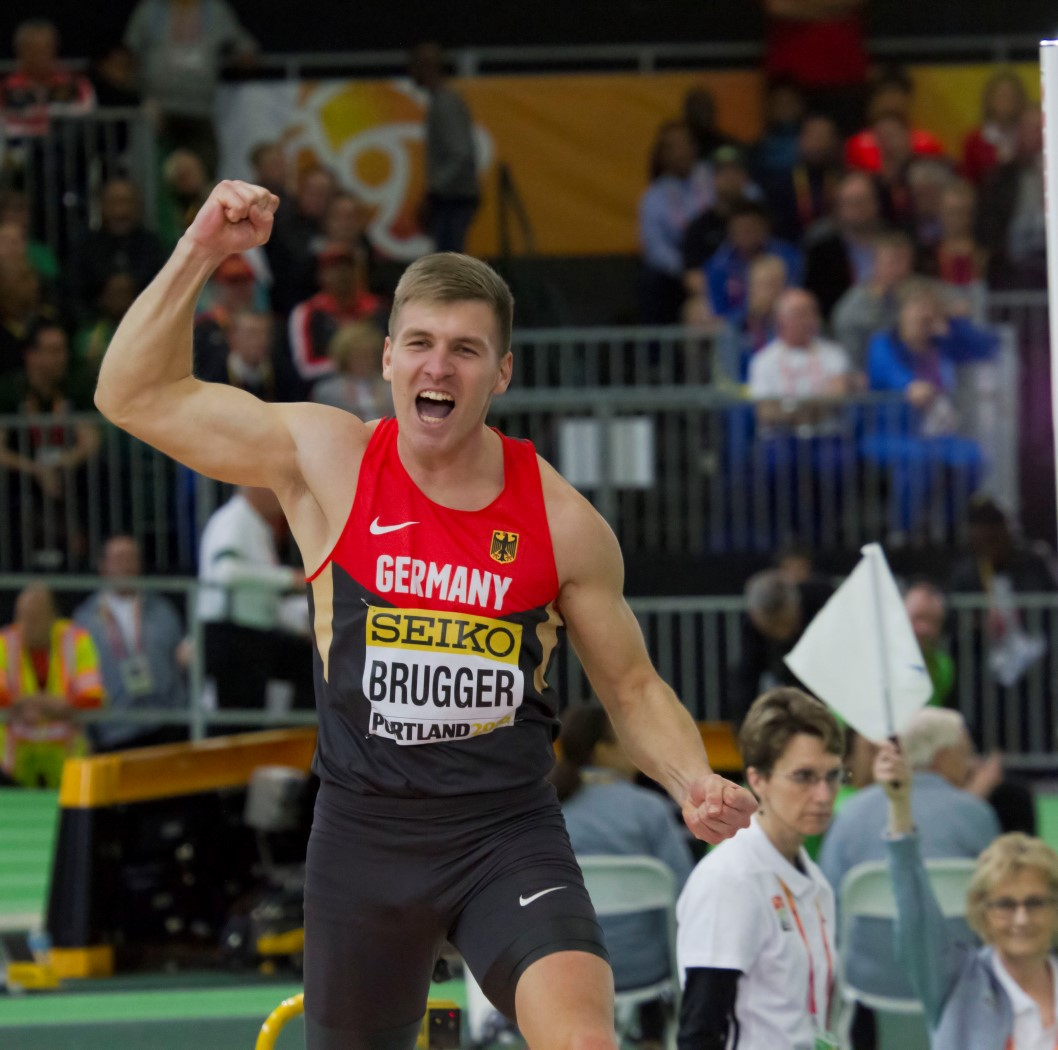

Medal record

Men's athletics

Representing Germany

World Indoor Championships
Bronze medal – third place	2016 Portland	Heptathlon

Mathias Brugger (born 6 August 1992) is a German track and field athlete who competes in the decathlon. He was a bronze medallist in the indoor heptathlon at the 2016 IAAF World Indoor Championships. His decathlon personal best is 8009 points, set in 2015.

A member of SSV Ulm 1846 athletics club and trained by Christopher Hallmann, Brugger failed to finish his first international decathlon at the 2010 World Junior Championships in Athletics. He rebounded, however, with a silver medal at the 2011 European Athletics Junior Championships the following season. He did not finish his first senior international at the 2012 European Athletics Championships and it was not until 2015 that he would represent Germany again at the top level, coming eleventh in the heptathlon at the 2015 European Athletics Indoor Championships.

Brugger broke new ground at the start of 2016 with a heptathlon personal best of 6060 points, taking second at the Tallinn Indoor Meeting. This ranked him fourth in the world on his entry to the 2016 IAAF World Indoor Championships. At the world competition he went exceeded himself again, scoring a total 6126 points to take the bronze medal in Portland, Oregon ahead of home athlete Curtis Beach. On his way to the podium, he set three personal bests: 5.10 m for the pole vault, 7.30 m for the long jump, and 2:34.10 minutes for the 1000 metres.

== Personal bests ==
- Decathlon – 8009 pts (2015)
- Heptathlon – 6126 pts (2016)

== International competitions ==
Year	Competition	Venue	Position	Event	Notes
2010	World Junior Championships	Moncton, Canada	—	Decathlon	DNF
2011	European Junior Championships	Tallinn, Estonia	2nd	Decathlon	7853 pts
2012	European Championships	Helsinki, Finland	—	Decathlon	DNF
2015	European Indoor Championships	Prague, Czech Republic	11th	Heptathlon	5846 pts
2016	World Indoor Championships	Portland, United States	3rd	Heptathlon	6126 pts
2016	European Championships	Amsterdam, Netherlands	9th	Decathlon	7886 pts
2017	European Indoor Championships	Belgrade, Serbia	8th	Heptathlon	5954 pts
2017	World Championships	London, United Kingdom	–	Decathlon	DNF
2018	European Championships	Berlin, Germany	–	Decathlon	DNF
