= 2013 European Athletics Indoor Championships – Men's heptathlon =

The Men's heptathlon event at the 2013 European Athletics Indoor Championships was held on March 2–3.

== Records ==
Standing records prior to the 2013 European Athletics Indoor Championships
World record	Ashton Eaton (USA)	6568	Tallinn, Estonia	6 February 2011
European record	Roman Šebrle (CZE)	6438	Budapest, Hungary	7 March 2004
Championship record	Tomáš Dvořák (CZE)	6424	Ghent, Belgium	26 February 2000
World Leading	Eelco Sintnicolaas (NED)	6341	Apeldoorn, Netherlands	10 February 2013
European Leading	Eelco Sintnicolaas (NED)	6341	Apeldoorn, Netherlands	10 February 2013

== Results ==
=== 60 metres ===
Rank	Heat	Name	Nationality	Time	Points	Notes
1	2	Jérémy Lelievre	France	6.84	940	
2	2	Dominik Distelberger	Austria	6.86	933	
3	2	Eelco Sintnicolaas	Netherlands	6.88	925	
4	2	Artem Lukyanenko	Russia	6.90	918	
5	1	Mihail Dudaš	Serbia	6.91	915	
6	2	Kaarel Jõeväli	Estonia	6.93	907	
7	2	Pelle Rietveld	Netherlands	6.95	900	
8	1	Petter Olson	Sweden	6.98	889	
9	1	Fabian Rosenquist	Sweden	7.00	882	
10	1	Ilya Shkurenev	Russia	7.05	865	
11	2	Attila Szabó	Hungary	7.06	861	
12	1	Adam Helcelet	Czech Republic	7.07	858	
13	2	Tiago Marto	Portugal	7.09	851	
14	1	Kevin Mayer	France	7.10	847	
15	1	Mikk Pahapill	Estonia	7.16	826	

=== Long jump ===
Rank	Athlete	Nationality	#1	#2	#3	Result	Points	Notes	Total
1	Kaarel Jõeväli	Estonia	7.01	7.36	7.67	7.67	977		1884
2	Eelco Sintnicolaas	Netherlands	7.50	7.61	x	7.61	962		1887
3	Mihail Dudaš	Serbia	7.37	7.55	7.32	7.55	947		1862
4	Kevin Mayer	France	7.31	7.36	7.54	7.54	945		1792
5	Fabian Rosenquist	Sweden	7.37	7.53	7.45	7.53	942		1824
6	Adam Helcelet	Czech Republic	7.10	7.24	7.49	7.49	932		1790
7	Dominik Distelberger	Austria	7.44	7.35	7.48	7.48	930		1863
8	Ilya Shkurenev	Russia	7.04	7.36	7.33	7.36	900		1765
9	Jérémy Lelievre	France	7.04	7.25	7.13	7.25	874		1814
10	Pelle Rietveld	Netherlands	7.09	7.22	7.09	7.22	866		1766
11	Artem Lukyanenko	Russia	7.06	7.19	7.20	7.20	862		1780
12	Tiago Marto	Portugal	7.12	7.03	7.17	7.17	854		1705
13	Petter Olson	Sweden	6.88	x	6.93	6.93	797		1686
14	Mikk Pahapill	Estonia	6.92	x	x	6.92	795		1621
15	Attila Szabó	Hungary	6.85	6.75	6.89	6.89	788		1649

=== Shot put ===
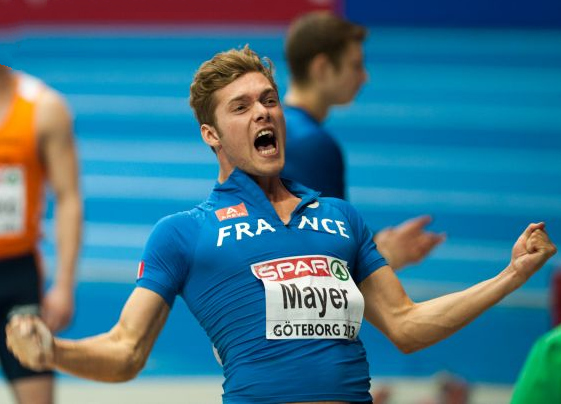
Kevin Mayer, finished first in the shot put and second overall.

Rank	Athlete	Nationality	#1	#2	#3	Result	Points	Notes	Total
1	Kevin Mayer	France	14.70	15.16	–	15.16	800		2592
2	Mikk Pahapill	Estonia	14.33	14.54	15.05	15.05	793		2414
3	Jérémy Lelievre	France	14.91	x	14.95	14.95	787		2601
4	Artem Lukyanenko	Russia	14.18	14.81	x	14.81	778		2558
5	Adam Helcelet	Czech Republic	x	14.48	x	14.48	758		2548
6	Tiago Marto	Portugal	13.33	13.46	14.21	14.21	741		2446
7	Mihail Dudaš	Serbia	14.02	13.91	14.12	14.12	736		2598
8	Eelco Sintnicolaas	Netherlands	13.75	x	14.11	14.11	735		2622
9	Kaarel Jõeväli	Estonia	13.91	13.64	x	13.91	723		2607
10	Pelle Rietveld	Netherlands	x	x	13.79	13.79	715		2481
11	Ilya Shkurenev	Russia	13.16	13.16	13.54	13.54	700		2465
12	Petter Olson	Sweden	12.66	13.37	13.21	13.37	690		2376
13	Fabian Rosenquist	Sweden	13.24	12.87	12.97	13.24	682		2506
14	Dominik Distelberger	Austria	12.04	12.88	12.76	12.88	660		2523
	Attila Szabó	Hungary				DNS	0		DNF

=== High jump ===
Rank	Athlete	Nationality	1.81	1.84	1.87	1.90	1.93	1.96	1.99	2.02	2.05	2.08	2.11	Result	Points	Notes	Total
1	Mihail Dudaš	Serbia	–	o	–	o	–	o	xxo	xo	o	xxo	x–	2.08	878		3476
2	Kevin Mayer	France	–	–	–	o	–	xo	o	xo	o	xxx		2.05	850		3442
3	Ilya Shkurenev	Russia	–	–	–	o	o	o	o	xo	xo	xxx		2.05	850		3315
4	Adam Helcelet	Czech Republic	–	–	–	o	–	o	xxo	o	xxx			2.02	822		3370
5	Fabian Rosenquist	Sweden	o	–	o	o	o	o	o	xo	xxx			2.02	822		3328
6	Petter Olson	Sweden	–	o	o	o	o	o	xo	xo	xxx			2.02	822		3198
7	Eelco Sintnicolaas	Netherlands	–	o	–	o	–	xo	o	xxo	xxx			2.02	822		3444
8	Mikk Pahapill	Estonia	–	–	–	–	o	xo	xo	xxx				1.99	794		3208
9	Kaarel Jõeväli	Estonia	–	–	–	o	–	o	xxx					1.96	767		3374
10	Artem Lukyanenko	Russia	–	xo	o	o	xxo	xxo	xxx					1.96	767		3325
11	Pelle Rietveld	Netherlands	o	o	o	o	xxx							1.90	714		3195
12	Dominik Distelberger	Austria	–	xo	o	o	xxx							1.90	714		3237
12	Tiago Marto	Portugal	o	o	xo	o	xxx							1.90	714		3160
13	Jérémy Lelievre	France	o	–	xo	xxx								1.87	687		3288

=== 60 metres hurdles ===
Rank	Heat	Name	Nationality	Time	Points	Notes	Total
1	2	Eelco Sintnicolaas	Netherlands	7.91	1005		4449
2	2	Pelle Rietveld	Netherlands	7.93	999		4194
3	2	Artem Lukyanenko	Russia	7.93	999		4324
4	1	Kevin Mayer	France	8.01	979		4421
5	2	Dominik Distelberger	Austria	8.03	974		4211
6	2	Adam Helcelet	Czech Republic	8.06	967		4337
7	1	Petter Olson	Sweden	8.11	954		4152
8	1	Mihail Dudaš	Serbia	8.13	949		4425
9	1	Kaarel Jõeväli	Estonia	8.16	942		4316
10	2	Ilya Shkurenev	Russia	8.22	927		4242
11	2	Tiago Marto	Portugal	8.23	925		4085
12	1	Jérémy Lelievre	France	8.27	915		4203
13	1	Fabian Rosenquist	Sweden	8.30	908		4236
14	1	Mikk Pahapill	Estonia	8.51	858		4066

=== Pole vault ===
Rank	Athlete	Nationality	3.80	4.00	4.10	4.20	4.30	4.40	4.50	4.60	4.70	4.80	4.90	5.00	5.10	5.20	5.30	5.40	5.50	Result	Points	Notes	Total
1	Eelco Sintnicolaas	Netherlands	–	–	–	–	–	–	–	–	–	–	–	–	o	–	o	o	xxx	5.40	1035		5484
2	Kevin Mayer	France	–	–	–	–	–	–	–	–	xo	–	o	–	o	xo	xxx			5.20	972		5393
3	Ilya Shkurenev	Russia	–	–	–	–	–	–	–	o	–	o	xo	xxo	o	xxo	xxx			5.20	972		5214
4	Adam Helcelet	Czech Republic	–	–	–	–	–	–	o	o	o	xxo	o	o	xxx					5.00	910		5247
5	Pelle Rietveld	Netherlands	–	–	–	–	–	–	–	o	–	o	xxx							4.80	849		5043
6	Dominik Distelberger	Austria	–	–	–	–	–	o	–	–	–	xo	xxx							4.80	849		5060
7	Fabian Rosenquist	Sweden	–	–	o	–	o	xo	xo	o	o	xo	xxx							4.80	849		5085
8	Artem Lukyanenko	Russia	–	–	–	–	–	–	–	o	o	xxx								4.70	819		5143
9	Kaarel Jõeväli	Estonia	–	–	–	–	o	xo	o	xo	o	xxx								4.70	819		5135
10	Tiago Marto	Portugal	–	o	–	o	–	o	xo	o	xo	xxx								4.70	819		4904
11	Mihail Dudaš	Serbia	–	–	–	–	–	o	–	o	xxx									4.60	790		5215
	Jérémy Lelievre	France	–	–	–	xxx														NM	0		4203
	Petter Olson	Sweden	x–																	NM	0		4152
	Mikk Pahapill	Estonia																		DNS	0		DNF

=== 1000 metres ===
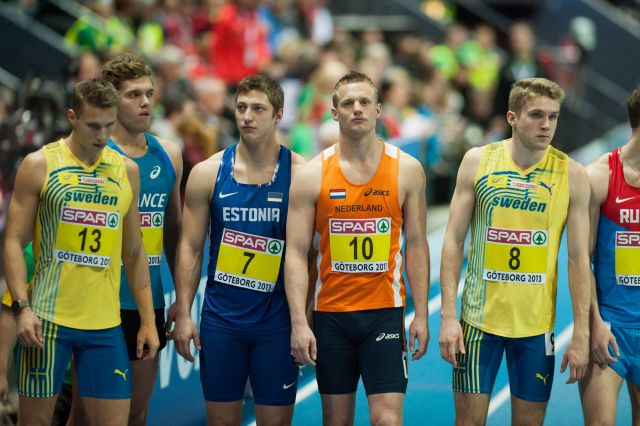
Left to right: Petter Olson, Kevin Mayer, Kaarel Jõeväli, Pelle Rietveld, Fabian Rosenquist

Rank	Name	Nationality	Time	Points	Notes
1	Jérémy Lelievre	France	2:36.83	909	
2	Kevin Mayer	France	2:37.30	904	PB
3	Fabian Rosenquist	Sweden	2:38.14	894	PB
4	Eelco Sintnicolaas	Netherlands	2:38.73	888	SB
5	Mihail Dudaš	Serbia	2:39.04	884	PB
6	Pelle Rietveld	Netherlands	2:40.98	863	PB
7	Adam Helcelet	Czech Republic	2:42.26	848	PB
8	Artem Lukyanenko	Russia	2:45.79	810	
9	Ilya Shkurenev	Russia	2:46.36	804	
10	Petter Olson	Sweden	2:48.50	781	
11	Tiago Marto	Portugal	2:48.97	776	
12	Kaarel Jõeväli	Estonia	2:55.80	706	
13	Dominik Distelberger	Austria	3:10.74	563	

=== Final standings ===
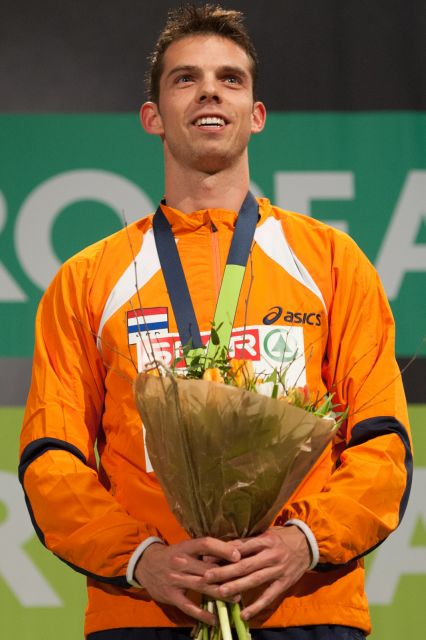
Gold medalist, Eelco Sintnicolaas

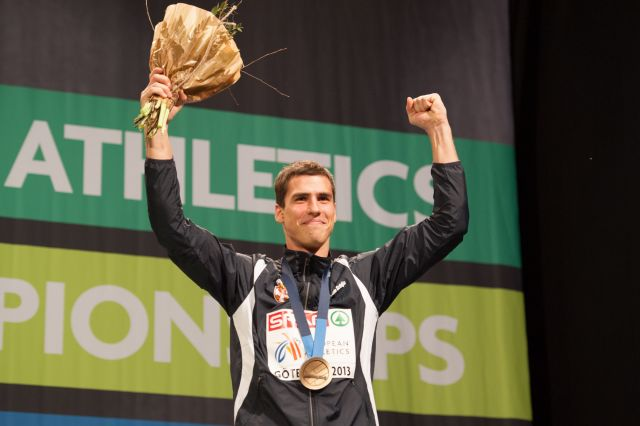
Bronze medalist, Mihail Dudaš

Rank	Name	Nationality	Points	Notes
1st place, gold medalist(s)	Eelco Sintnicolaas	Netherlands	6372	WL, NR
2nd place, silver medalist(s)	Kevin Mayer	France	6297	PB
3rd place, bronze medalist(s)	Mihail Dudaš	Serbia	6099	NR
4	Adam Helcelet	Czech Republic	6095	PB
5	Ilya Shkurenev	Russia	6018	PB
6	Fabian Rosenquist	Sweden	5979	PB
7	Artem Lukyanenko	Russia	5953	
8	Pelle Rietveld	Netherlands	5906	PB
9	Kaarel Jõeväli	Estonia	5841	
10	Tiago Marto	Portugal	5680	
11	Dominik Distelberger	Austria	5623	
12	Jérémy Lelievre	France	5112	
13	Petter Olson	Sweden	4933	
	Mikk Pahapill	Estonia	DNF	
	Attila Szabó	Hungary	DNF	
