= 2012 IAAF World Indoor Championships – Men's heptathlon =

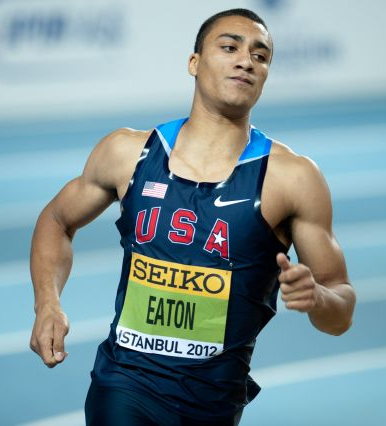
Gold medal winner Ashton Eaton en route to victory.

The men's heptathlon at the 2012 IAAF World Indoor Championships took place 9-10 March 2012 at the Ataköy Athletics Arena. Eight athletes from seven countries participated, two of them being Russian. American Ashton Eaton won with a world record points total of 6645, breaking his own previous record of 6568.

The winning margin was 574 points which as of July 2024 remains the only time the men's heptathlon was won by more than 400 points at these championships. The gold medallist achieved the best score in five of the seven events.

== Medallists ==
Gold	Silver	Bronze
Ashton Eaton; United States	Oleksiy Kasyanov; Ukraine	Artem Lukyanenko; Russia

== Records ==
Standing records prior to the 2012 IAAF World Indoor Championships
World record	Ashton Eaton (USA)	6568	Tallinn, Estonia	6 February 2011
Championship record	Dan O'Brien (USA)	6476	Toronto, Canada	14 March 1993
World Leading	Oleksiy Kasyanov (UKR)	6237	Zaporizhia, Ukraine	28 January 2012
African record	Larbi Bouraada (ALG)	5911	Paris, France	28 February 2010
Asian record	Dmitriy Karpov (KAZ)	6229	Tallinn, Estonia	16 February 2008
European record	Roman Šebrle (CZE)	6438	Budapest, Hungary	7 March 2004
North and Central American and Caribbean record	Ashton Eaton (USA)	6568	Tallinn, Estonia	6 February 2011
Oceanian Record	Brent Newdick (AUS)	5758	Tallinn, Estonia	4 February 2012
South American record	Gonzalo Barroilhet (CHI)	5951	Fayetteville, United States	15 March 2008

== Qualification standards ==
Eight (8) athletes will be invited by the IAAF in the Heptathlon and in the Pentathlon as follows:

1. the three best athletes from the previous year’s Outdoor Lists (as at 31 December), limited to a maximum of one per country and
2. the three best athletes from the Indoor Lists during the year of the Competition
3. two athletes which may be invited at the discretion of the IAAF

In total no more than two male and two female athletes from any one Member will be invited. Upon refusals or cancellations, the invitations shall be extended to the next ranked athletes in the same lists respecting the above conditions. Members whose athletes are invited as above will receive additional quota places accordingly

== Schedule ==
Date	Time	Round
March 9, 2012	11:35	60 metres
March 9, 2012	12:35	Long jump
March 9, 2012	17:40	Shot put
March 9, 2012	18:50	High jump
March 10, 2012	9:30	60 metres hurdles
March 10, 2012	10:30	Pole vault
March 10, 2012	18:20	1000 metres
March 10, 2012	18:20	Final standings

== Results ==
=== 60 metres ===
Rank	Lane	Name	Nationality	Result	Points	Notes
1	4	Ashton Eaton	United States	6.79	958	
2	6	Oleksiy Kasyanov	Ukraine	6.87	929	
3	3	Yordani García	Cuba	7.02	875	
4	2	Artem Lukyanenko	Russia	7.07	858	
5	8	Adam Sebastian Helcelet	Czech Republic	7.19	816	
6	5	Mikk Pahapill	Estonia	7.27	789	SB
7	1	Ilya Shkurenev	Russia	7.39	749	
8	7	Andrei Krauchanka	Belarus	7.46	726	

=== Long jump ===
Rank	Name	Nationality	#1	#2	#3	Result	Points	Notes	Summary
1	Ashton Eaton	United States	8.16	x	—	8.16	1102	PB	2060
2	Oleksiy Kasyanov	Ukraine	7.62	x	7.68	7.68	980		1909
3	Ilya Shkurenev	Russia	7.30	7.50	x	7.50	935	PB	1684
4	Artem Lukyanenko	Russia	7.26	7.38	7.17	7.38	905	PB	1763
5	Andrei Krauchanka	Belarus	x	7.36	x	7.36	900		1626
6	Adam Sebastian Helcelet	Czech Republic	x	7.24	7.05	7.24	871		1687
7	Mikk Pahapill	Estonia	6.74	6.70	x	6.74	753		1542
8	Yordani García	Cuba	x	6.48	6.64	6.64	729	SB	1604

=== Shot put ===
Rank	Name	Nationality	#1	#2	#3	Result	Points	Notes	Summary
1	Oleksiy Kasyanov	Ukraine	15.24	14.76	14.61	15.24	804		2713
2	Andrei Krauchanka	Belarus	14.71	14.61	14.90	14.90	784	SB	2410
3	Ashton Eaton	United States	x	13.89	14.56	14.56	763	SB	2823
4	Mikk Pahapill	Estonia	14.54	14.11	14.48	14.54	761		2303
5	Artem Lukyanenko	Russia	13.19	14.35	x	14.35	750		2513
6	Yordani García	Cuba	14.18	x	x	14.18	739	SB	2343
7	Adam Sebastian Helcelet	Czech Republic	13.97	13.97	14.04	14.04	731		2418
8	Ilya Shkurenev	Russia	12.62	13.06	13.39	13.39	691	PB	2375

=== High jump ===
Rank	Name	Nationality	1.88	1.91	1.94	1.97	2.00	2.03	2.06	2.09	Result	Points	Notes	Summary
1	Adam Sebastian Helcelet	Czech Republic	–	o	–	o	xo	xxo	o	xxx	2.06	859	PB	3277
2	Yordani García	Cuba	–	o	o	xo	o	o	xo	xxx	2.06	859	SB	3202
3	Ashton Eaton	United States	–	o	o	o	o	o	–	xxx	2.03	831	SB	3654
3	Andrei Krauchanka	Belarus	–	o	–	o	o	o	xxx		2.03	831	SB	3241
5	Ilya Shkurenev	Russia	o	o	o	o	xxo	o	xxx		2.03	831		3206
6	Oleksiy Kasyanov	Ukraine	–	xo	o	o	xxx				1.97	776		3489
6	Artem Lukyanenko	Russia	–	xo	o	o	xxx				1.97	776		3289
8	Mikk Pahapill	Estonia	–	o	xxo	xxx					1.94	749	SB	3052

=== 60 metres hurdles ===
Rank	Name	Nationality	Result	Points	Notes	Summary
1	Ashton Eaton	United States	7.68	1064		4718
2	Ilya Shkurenev	Russia	8.10	957	PB	4163
3	Artem Lukyanenko	Russia	8.13	949		4238
4	Yordani García	Cuba	8.13	949	SB	4151
5	Adam Sebastian Helcelet	Czech Republic	8.16	942		4219
6	Andrei Krauchanka	Belarus	8.21	930	SB	4171
7	Oleksiy Kasyanov	Ukraine	8.39	886		4375
8	Mikk Pahapill	Estonia	DNF	0		3052

=== Pole vault ===
Rank	Name	Nationality	4.30	4.50	4.60	4.70	4.80	4.90	5.00	5.10	5.20	5.30	Result	Points	Notes	Summary
1	Ashton Eaton	United States	–	o	–	o	–	o	o	o	xo	xxx	5.20	972	SB	5690
2	Artem Lukyanenko	Russia	–	o	o	o	o	o	o	xxx			5.00	910	PB	5148
3	Ilya Shkurenev	Russia	–	o	–	o	o	o	xxx				4.90	880		5043
4	Oleksiy Kasyanov	Ukraine	o	o	o	o	o	xxx					4.80	849	SB	5224
5	Andrei Krauchanka	Belarus	–	–	xo	–	o	–	xxx				4.80	849	SB	5020
6	Adam Sebastian Helcelet	Czech Republic	o	o	xxo	o	xxx						4.70	819		5038
7	Yordani García	Cuba	–	–	xo	xxx							4.60	790		4941
	Mikk Pahapill	Estonia											DNS	0		DNF

=== 1000 metres ===
Rank	Name	Nationality	Result	Points	Notes
1	Ashton Eaton	United States	2:32.78	955	CR
2	Ilya Shkurenev	Russia	2:41.66	855	PB
3	Oleksiy Kasyanov	Ukraine	2:42.41	847	NR
4	Adam Sebastian Helcelet	Czech Republic	2:43.05	840	PB
5	Artem Lukyanenko	Russia	2:44.82	821	PB
6	Yordani García	Cuba	2:50.21	763	PB
7	Andrei Krauchanka	Belarus	2:53.83	726	SB

=== Final standings ===
Rank	Name	Nationality	Points	Notes
1st place, gold medalist(s)	Ashton Eaton	United States	6645	WR, CR
2nd place, silver medalist(s)	Oleksiy Kasyanov	Ukraine	6071	
3rd place, bronze medalist(s)	Artem Lukyanenko	Russia	5969	
4	Ilya Shkurenev	Russia	5898	
5	Adam Sebastian Helcelet	Czech Republic	5878	
6	Andrei Krauchanka	Belarus	5746	
7	Yordani García	Cuba	5704	SB
	Mikk Pahapill	Estonia	DNF	
