= Jérémy Lelièvre =

French athletics competitor

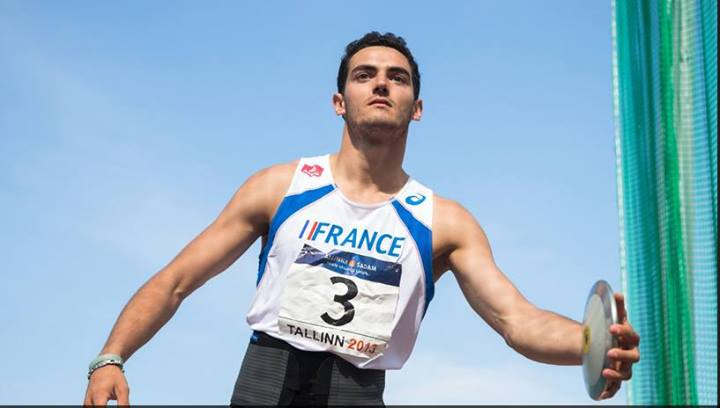
- Jérémy Lelièvre in 2013

Personal information
- Born: 8 February 1991 (age 35) Évreux, France
- Education: Institut de Formation en Masso-Kinesitherapie
- Height: 1.93 m (6 ft 4 in)
- Weight: 82 kg (181 lb)

Sport
- Sport: Athletics
- Event: Decathlon
- Club: SPN Vernon
- Coached by: Nicolas Delahaye

Jérémy Lelièvre (born 8 February 1991 in Évreux) is a French athlete competing in combined events. He represented his country in the heptathlon at the 2016 World Indoor Championships finishing eighth.

== Competition record ==
Year	Competition	Venue	Position	Event	Notes
Representing France
2009	European Junior Championships	Novi Sad, Serbia	–	Decathlon (junior)	DNF
2010	World Junior Championships	Moncton, Canada	7th	Decathlon (junior)	7568 pts
2011	European U23 Championships	Ostrava, Czech Republic	14th	Decathlon	7368 pts
2013	European Indoor Championships	Gothenburg, Sweden	12th	Heptathlon	5112 pts
2013	European U23 Championships	Tampere, Finland	6th	Decathlon	7680 pts
2015	Universiade	Gwangju, South Korea	4th	Decathlon	7593 pts
2016	World Indoor Championships	Portland, United States	8th	Heptathlon	5769 pts
2017	Universiade	Taipei, Taiwan	7th	Decathlon	7387 pts

== Personal bests ==
Outdoor

- 100 metres – 10.83 (+1.6 m/s, Nice 2014)
- 400 metres – 47.83 (Tallinn 2013)
- 1000 metres – 2:37.64 (Maromme 2012)
- 1500 metres – 4:21.80 (Tallinn 2017)
- 110 metres hurdles – 14.48 (-0.8 m/s, Toruń 2014)
- High jump – 1.93 (Arles 2013)
- Pole vault – 4.70 (Antony 2012)
- Long jump – 7.54 (+1.2 m/s, Marseille 2017)
- Shot put – 15.21 (Gwangju 2015)
- Discus throw – 44.37 (Tallinn 2013)
- Javelin throw – 59.69 (Lillebonne 2013)
- Decathlon – 7911 (Aubagne 2012)

Indoor

- 60 metres – 6.84 (Gothenburg 2013)
- 1000 metres – 2:35.89 (Aubière 2013)
- 60 metres hurdles – 8.14 (Reims 2016)
- High jump – 1.97 (Aubière 2013)
- Pole vault – 4.65 (Aubière 2016)
- Long jump – 7.36 (Aubière 2013)
- Shot put – 15.37 (Aubière 2015)
- Heptathlon – 5997 (Aubière 2013)
