= Eelco Sintnicolaas =

Dutch athlete

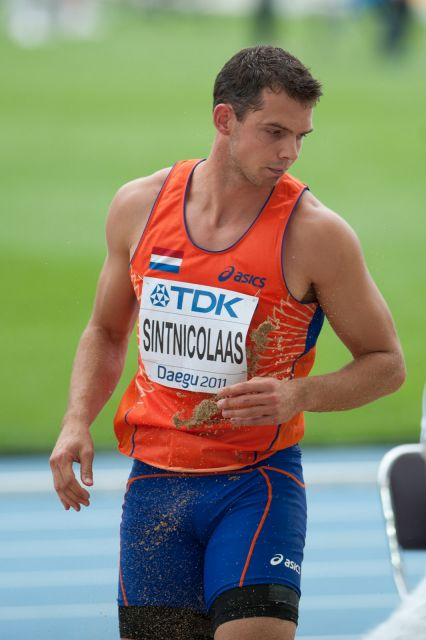
- Sintnicolaas in 2011

Personal information
- Born: 7 April 1987 (age 39)
- Height: 1.86 m (6 ft 1 in)
- Weight: 80 kg (176 lb)

Sport
- Country: Netherlands
- Sport: Athletics
- Event: Decathlon

Achievements and titles
- Highest world ranking: 239 (Decathlon); 4699 (Overall)
Medal record
Men's athletics
Representing the Netherlands
European Championships
Silver medal – second place	2010 Barcelona	Decathlon
European Indoor Championships
Gold medal – first place	2013 Gothenburg	Heptathlon
Bronze medal – third place	2015 Prague	Heptathlon
European U23 Championships
Gold medal – first place	2009 Kaunas	Decathlon

Eelco Sintnicolaas (Dutch: [ˈeːlkoː sɪntˈnikoːlaːs]; born 7 April 1987) is a Dutch track and field athlete, specialising in the decathlon.

His personal best in the decathlon is a score of 8,052 points at the Götzis Meeting in 2009. That same year he earned a gold medal at the U23 European Championships, with 8,112 points, whereas his best result was a silver medal at the 2010 European Championships in Athletics in Barcelona with 8,436 points. At the Götzis Meeting in 2012 he finished second with personal best result 8,506 pts.

He cleared 8,000 points at the 2013 Decastar meeting, taking third place with a total of 8,018.

== International competitions ==
Representing the Netherlands
Year	Competition	Venue	Position	Event	Notes
2005	European Junior Championships	Kaunas, Lithuania	14th	Decathlon (junior)	5,997 pts
2006	World Junior Championships	Beijing, China	8th	Decathlon (junior)	7,416 pts
2009	European Indoor Championships	Turin, Italy	–	Heptathlon	DNF
2009	European U23 Championships	Kaunas, Lithuania	1st	Decathlon	8,112 pts
2009	World Championships	Berlin, Germany	–	Decathlon	DNF
2010	European Championships	Barcelona, Spain	2nd	Decathlon	8,436 pts
2011	European Indoor Championships	Paris, France	4th	Heptathlon	6,175 pts
2011	World Championships	Daegu, South Korea	5th	Decathlon	8,298 pts
2012	Olympic Games	London, United Kingdom	11th	Decathlon	8,034 pts
2013	European Indoor Championships	Gothenburg, Sweden	1st	Heptathlon	6,372 pts
2013	World Championships	Moscow, Russia	5th	Decathlon	8,391 pts
2014	World Indoor Championships	Sopot, Poland	4th	Heptathlon	6,198 pts
2014	European Championships	Zürich, Switzerland	4th	Decathlon	8,478 pts
2015	European Indoor Championships	Prague, Czech Republic	3rd	Heptathlon	6,185 pts
2015	World Championships	Beijing, China	–	Decathlon	DNF
2016	European Championships	Amsterdam, Netherlands	16th	Decathlon	7,025 pts
2016	Olympic Games	Rio de Janeiro, Brazil	–	Decathlon	DNF
2017	World Championships	London, United Kingdom	–	Decathlon	DNF
2018	World Indoor Championships	Birmingham, United Kingdom	5th	Heptathlon	5,997 pts
2018	European Championships	Berlin, Germany	–	Decathlon	DNF

== Personal bests ==
Outdoor

- 100 metres – 10.57 (Götzis 2017)
- 200 metres – 22.27 (+0.3 m/s, Apeldoorn 2008)
- 400 metres – 47.88 (Barcelona 2010)
- 1500 metres – 4:22.29 (Götzis 2011)
- 110 metres hurdles – 13.92 (+0.9 m/s, Nottwil 2013)
- High jump – 2.02 (Moscow 2013)
- Pole vault – 5.45 (Barcelona 2010)
- Long jump – 7.65 (+0.8 m/s, Moscow 2013)
- Shot put – 14.67 (Götzis 2015)
- Discus throw – 43.52 (Götzis 2017)
- Javelin throw – 63.59 (Götzis 2012)
- Decathlon – 8.532 (Götzis 2017) NR

Indoor

- 60 metres – 6.88 (Gothenburg 2013)
- 1000 metres – 2:38.73 (Gothenburg 2013)
- 60 metres hurdles – 7.88 (Apeldoorn 2013)
- High jump – 2.08 (Apeldoorn 2013)
- Pole vault – 5.52 (Apeldoorn 2011)
- Long jump – 7.65 (Ghent 2007)
- Shot put – 14.86 (Apeldoorn 2016)
- Heptathlon – 6372 (Gothenburg 2013) NR

Awards
Preceded by Martijn Nuijens	Men's Dutch Athlete of the Year; 2010, 2011; 2014	Succeeded by Churandy Martina
Preceded by Ignisious Gaisah	Men's Dutch Athlete of the Year; 2010, 2011; 2014	Succeeded by Liemarvin Bonevacia
