= 2015 European Athletics Indoor Championships – Men's heptathlon =

The men's heptathlon event at the 2015 European Athletics Indoor Championships was held between March 7 and 8.

== Medalists ==
Gold	Silver	Bronze
Ilya Shkurenyov; Russia	Arthur Abele; Germany	Eelco Sintnicolaas; Netherlands

== Results ==
=== 60 metres ===
Rank	Heat	Name	Nationality	Time	Points	Notes
1	1	Arthur Abele	Germany	6.93	907	PB
1	2	Marek Lukáš	Czech Republic	6.93	907	PB
3	2	Jorge Ureña	Spain	6.96	897	
4	1	Eelco Sintnicolaas	Netherlands	6.98	889	SB
4	2	Ilya Shkurenyov	Russia	6.98	889	PB
6	2	Artem Lukyanenko	Russia	7.02	875	SB
7	1	Petter Olson	Sweden	7.03	872	SB
7	2	Paweł Wiesiołek	Poland	7.03	872	PB
7	2	Adam Helcelet	Czech Republic	7.03	872	
10	2	Mathias Brugger	Germany	7.05	865	PB
11	1	Bastien Auzeil	France	7.08	854	PB
12	2	Gaël Querin	France	7.12	840	
13	1	Niels Pittomvils	Belgium	7.22	806	
14	1	Pieter Braun	Netherlands	7.23	802	PB
	1	Einar Daði Lárusson	Iceland	DNS	0	

=== Long jump ===
Rank	Athlete	Nationality	#1	#2	#3	Result	Points	Notes	Total
1	Ilya Shkurenyov	Russia	7.70	7.78	–	7.78	1005	PB	1894
2	Paweł Wiesiołek	Poland	x	7.16	7.63	7.63	967	PB	1839
3	Arthur Abele	Germany	7.31	7.56	–	7.56	950	PB	1857
4	Eelco Sintnicolaas	Netherlands	x	7.37	7.51	7.51	937	SB	1826
5	Gaël Querin	France	7.26	x	7.41	7.41	913	SB	1753
6	Adam Helcelet	Czech Republic	7.38	7.03	7.30	7.38	905		1777
7	Pieter Braun	Netherlands	7.02	7.11	x	7.11	840		1642
8	Petter Olson	Sweden	7.11	x	x	7.11	840	SB	1712
9	Bastien Auzeil	France	7.06	7.08	6.90	7.08	833		1687
10	Marek Lukáš	Czech Republic	7.04	x	7.04	7.04	823		1730
11	Mathias Brugger	Germany	4.93	x	6.99	6.99	811		1676
12	Jorge Ureña	Spain	x	5.17	6.88	6.88	785		1682
13	Artem Lukyanenko	Russia	6.79	6.75	6.75	6.79	764		1639
	Niels Pittomvils	Belgium	x	x	x	NM	0		806

=== Shot put ===
Rank	Athlete	Nationality	#1	#2	#3	Result	Points	Notes	Total
1	Arthur Abele	Germany	x	14.60	15.54	15.54	823	PB	2680
2	Mathias Brugger	Germany	15.25	x	15.00	15.25	805		2481
3	Bastien Auzeil	France	13.55	14.81	14.90	14.90	784		2471
4	Artem Lukyanenko	Russia	14.70	x	x	14.70	771		2410
5	Adam Helcelet	Czech Republic	14.24	14.04	14.43	14.43	755		2532
6	Paweł Wiesiołek	Poland	14.32	x	14.20	14.32	748	PB	2587
7	Eelco Sintnicolaas	Netherlands	13.64	13.75	14.03	14.03	730	SB	2556
8	Ilya Shkurenyov	Russia	13.66	13.89	13.58	13.89	722		2616
9	Pieter Braun	Netherlands	13.21	13.35	13.85	13.85	722	PB	2361
10	Gaël Querin	France	13.81	13.79	13.78	13.81	717		2470
11	Marek Lukáš	Czech Republic	13.30	x	13.69	13.69	709		2439
12	Jorge Ureña	Spain	13.06	13.46	13.25	13.46	695		2377
13	Petter Olson	Sweden	13.26	13.37	13.40	13.40	692	SB	2404
	Niels Pittomvils	Belgium				DNS	0	SB	DNF

=== High jump ===
Rank	Athlete	Nationality	1.80	1.83	1.86	1.89	1.92	1.95	1.98	2.01	2.04	2.07	2.10	2.13	Result	Points	Notes	Total
1	Ilya Shkurenyov	Russia	–	–	–	o	–	o	o	o	xxo	o	xo	xxx	2.10	896		3512
2	Jorge Ureña	Spain	–	–	o	–	o	o	o	o	o	xxx			2.04	840	PB	3217
3	Adam Helcelet	Czech Republic	–	–	–	o	–	o	o	o	xxx				2.01	813		3345
4	Gaël Querin	France	–	–	o	o	xo	o	xxo	o	xxx				2.01	813		3283
5	Bastien Auzeil	France	–	–	–	o	o	o	xxo	xo	xxx				2.01	813	=PB	3284
6	Pieter Braun	Netherlands	–	–	–	o	–	o	o	xxx					1.98	785		3146
6	Paweł Wiesiołek	Poland	–	–	–	–	o	–	o	xxx					1.98	785		3372
8	Marek Lukáš	Czech Republic	o	o	o	o	o	o	xo	xxx					1.98	785	PB	3224
8	Eelco Sintnicolaas	Netherlands	–	–	o	–	o	o	xo	xxx					1.98	785	SB	3224
10	Petter Olson	Sweden	–	–	o	–	xxo	xxo	xo	xxx					1.98	785		3189
11	Artem Lukyanenko	Russia	–	o	o	o	o	o	xxx						1.95	758		3168
12	Mathias Brugger	Germany	–	–	–	xo	–	xxo	xxx						1.95	758		3239
13	Arthur Abele	Germany	–	–	o	–	xo	xxx							1.92	731		3411

=== 60 metres hurdles ===
Rank	Heat	Name	Nationality	Time	Points	Notes	Total
1	1	Arthur Abele	Germany	7.67	1066	EB, CB	4477
2	2	Jorge Ureña	Spain	7.81	1030	PB	4247
3	2	Ilya Shkurenyov	Russia	7.86	1017	PB	4529
4	2	Adam Helcelet	Czech Republic	7.95	994		4339
5	1	Gaël Querin	France	7.98	987	=PB	4270
5	2	Eelco Sintnicolaas	Netherlands	7.98	987	SB	4328
7	2	Artem Lukyanenko	Russia	8.01	979	SB	4147
8	2	Marek Lukáš	Czech Republic	8.07	964		4188
9	1	Bastien Auzeil	France	8.10	957	PB	4241
10	1	Paweł Wiesiołek	Poland	8.13	949		4321
11	1	Pieter Braun	Netherlands	8.17	939	SB, F1	4085
12	2	Petter Olson	Sweden	8.19	935		4124
13	1	Mathias Brugger	Germany	8.26	917		4156

=== Pole vault ===
Rank	Athlete	Nationality	4.30	4.40	4.50	4.60	4.70	4.80	4.90	5.00	5.10	5.20	5.30	5.40	Result	Points	Notes	Total
1	Ilya Shkurenyov	Russia	–	–	–	–	–	o	o	o	o	o	o	xxx	5.30	1004	PB	5533
2	Eelco Sintnicolaas	Netherlands	–	–	–	–	–	–	–	–	–	xo	xxx		5.20	972		5300
3	Bastien Auzeil	France	–	–	–	–	–	o	–	xo	o	xo	xxx		5.20	972	PB	5213
4	Artem Lukyanenko	Russia	–	–	–	o	o	o	xo	xxo	o	xo	xxx		5.20	972	PB	5119
5	Gaël Querin	France	–	–	o	–	o	–	o	o	xxx				5.00	910	PB	5180
6	Petter Olson	Sweden	–	–	–	o	o	o	xo	o	xxx				5.00	910		5034
7	Adam Helcelet	Czech Republic	–	–	o	o	o	o	o	xxx					4.90	880	=SB	5219
8	Arthur Abele	Germany	–	–	–	xo	–	o	xo	xxx					4.90	880	PB	5357
9	Mathias Brugger	Germany	–	–	–	o	–	o	–	xxx					4.80	849		5005
10	Jorge Ureña	Spain	–	o	–	xo	–	o	xxx						4.80	849	PB	5096
11	Marek Lukáš	Czech Republic	o	–	xo	o	o	xo	xxx						4.80	849	=PB	5037
12	Paweł Wiesiołek	Poland	–	o	o	xxx									4.50	760		5081
	Pieter Braun	Netherlands	–	–	–	–	xxx								NM	0		4085

=== 1000 metres ===
Rank	Name	Nationality	Time	Points	Notes
1	Gaël Querin	France	2:34.54	935	
2	Arthur Abele	Germany	2:35.64	922	PB
3	Eelco Sintnicolaas	Netherlands	2:39.00	885	SB
4	Jorge Ureña	Spain	2:42.61	845	
5	Mathias Brugger	Germany	2:42.92	841	
6	Petter Olson	Sweden	2:43.51	835	
7	Marek Lukáš	Czech Republic	2:44.15	828	PB
8	Ilya Shkurenyov	Russia	2:44.84	820	SB
9	Adam Helcelet	Czech Republic	2:45.66	812	SB
10	Bastien Auzeil	France	2:46.93	798	PB
11	Pieter Braun	Netherlands	2:51.77	747	
12	Artem Lukyanenko	Russia	2:52.65	738	
	Paweł Wiesiołek	Poland	DNS	0	

=== Final results ===
The highest mark recorded in each event is highlighted in yellow

Rank	Athlete	Nationality	60m	LJ	SP	HJ	60m H	PV	1000m	Points	Notes
1st place, gold medalist(s)	Ilya Shkurenyov	Russia	6.98	7.78	13.89	2.10	7.86	5.30	2:44.84	6353	WL, PB
2nd place, silver medalist(s)	Arthur Abele	Germany	6.93	7.56	15.54	1.92	7.67	4.90	2:35.64	6279	PB
3rd place, bronze medalist(s)	Eelco Sintnicolaas	Netherlands	6.98	7.51	14.03	1.98	7.98	5.20	2:39.00	6185	SB
4	Gaël Querin	France	7.12	7.41	13.81	2.01	7.98	5.00	2:34.54	6115	PB
5	Adam Helcelet	Czech Republic	7.03	7.38	14.43	2.01	7.95	4.90	2:45.66	6031	
6	Bastien Auzeil	France	7.08	7.08	14.90	2.01	8.10	5.20	2:46.93	6011	PB
7	Jorge Ureña	Spain	6.96	6.88	13.46	2.04	7.81	4.80	2:42.61	5941	
8	Petter Olson	Sweden	7.03	7.11	13.40	1.98	8.19	5.00	2:43.51	5869	SB
9	Marek Lukáš	Czech Republic	6.93	7.04	13.69	1.98	8.07	4.80	2:44.15	5865	
10	Artem Lukyanenko	Russia	7.02	6.79	14.70	1.95	8.01	5.20	2:52.65	5857	
11	Mathias Brugger	Germany	7.05	6.99	15.25	1.95	8.26	4.80	2:42.92	5846	
12	Pieter Braun	Netherlands	7.23	7.11	13.85	1.98	8.17	NM	2:51.77	4832	
	Paweł Wiesiołek	Poland	7.03	7.63	14.32	1.98	8.13	4.50	DNS	DNF	
	Niels Pittomvils	Belgium	7.22	NM	DNS	–	–	–	–	DNF	
	Einar Daði Lárusson	Iceland	DNS	–	–	–	–	–	–	DNS	
