= World Athletics Indoor Championships =

Bi-annual global indoor track and field competition

- Status: active
- Genre: Athletics World championship
- Date: varying
- Frequency: biennial
- Country: varying
- Inaugurated: 1985
- Most recent: 2026
- Next event: 2028
- Organiser: World Athletics
- Website: worldathletics.org

The World Athletics Indoor Championships are a biennial indoor track and field competition served as the global championship for that version of the sport. Organised by the World Athletics, the competition was inaugurated as the World Indoor Games in 1985 in Paris, France and were subsequently renamed to IAAF World Indoor Championships in 1987. The current name was adapted with the name change of the sports governing body in 2019.

They have been held every two years except for when they were held in consecutive years 2003 and 2004 to facilitate the need for them to be held in alternate years to the outdoor World Athletics Championships in the future, and in 2024, 2025, and 2026. The Championships due to be held in China in 2020 were postponed because of the COVID pandemic, as were the attempted running of the China edition in then 2021 and 2023, eventually being scheduled for 2025. Two standard editions of the Championships were held in 2022 and 2024.

== Events ==
The events held have been composed of a regular disciplines, with the main alterations coming in the earlier years. The 4 × 400 m relay race for both men and women was added to the full schedule in 1991 with the women's triple jump, the latter as an exhibition event, and gaining full status at the following championships.

Racewalking events were dropped after 1993, and a 1600 m medley relay was tried but was discontinued were due to alleged poor interest. This same year, a men's heptathlon and women's pentathlon were successfully introduced as non-championship events, and have remained on the program since.

In 1997 the women's pole vault entered the fray, two years before it made an appearance at the event's outdoor counterpart.

Despite the event's popularity, the 200 m was removed from the program after the 2004 championships, as the event was deemed unfair to all participants and too predictable, with the tighter bends of an indoor track causing any athletes not drawn in either of the outside lanes having minimal or no chance of winning.

== Championships ==
Ed.	Year	Host city	Host country	Date	Venue	Events	Nations	Athletes	Top of the medal table
I	1985	Paris	France	18–19 January 1985	Palais Omnisports de Paris-Bercy	24	69	319	East Germany
II	1987	Indianapolis	United States	6–8 March 1987	Hoosier Dome	24	85	419	Soviet Union
III	1989	Budapest	Hungary	3–5 March 1989	Budapest Sportcsarnok	24	62	373	Soviet Union
IV	1991	Seville	Spain	8–10 March 1991	Palacio Municipal de Deportes San Pablo	26 (Note: +1 non-championship event)	80	518	Soviet Union
V	1993	Toronto	Canada	12–14 March 1993	SkyDome	27 (Note: +4 non-championship events)	93	537	Russia
VI	1995	Barcelona	Spain	10–12 March 1995	Palau Sant Jordi	27	131	594	Russia
VII	1997	Paris	France	7–9 March 1997	Palais Omnisports de Paris-Bercy	28	118	712	United States
VIII	1999	Maebashi	Japan	5–7 March 1999	Green Dome Maebashi	28	115	451	United States
IX	2001	Lisbon	Portugal	9–11 March 2001	Pavilhão Atlântico	28	136	510	United States
X	2003	Birmingham	United Kingdom	14–16 March 2003	National Indoor Arena	28	131	583	United States
XI	2004	Budapest	Hungary	5–7 March 2004	Budapest Sports Arena	28	139	677	Russia
XII	2006	Moscow	Russia	10–12 March 2006	Olimpiysky Stadium	26	129	562	United States
XIII	2008	Valencia	Spain	7–9 March 2008	Luis Puig Palace	26	147	574	United States
XIV	2010	Doha	Qatar	12–14 March 2010	Aspire Dome	26	146	585	United States
XV	2012	Istanbul	Turkey	9–11 March 2012	Ataköy Athletics Arena	26	171	629	United States
XVI	2014	Sopot	Poland	7–9 March 2014	Ergo Arena	26	134	538	United States
XVII	2016	Portland	United States	17–20 March 2016	Oregon Convention Center	26	137	487	United States
XVIII	2018	Birmingham	United Kingdom	1–4 March 2018	National Indoor Arena	26	134	554	United States
XIX	2022	Belgrade	Serbia	18–20 March 2022	Belgrade Arena	26	128	611	Ethiopia
XX	2024	Glasgow	United Kingdom	1–3 March 2024	Emirates Arena	26	128	587	United States
XXI	2025	Nanjing	China	21–23 March 2025	Nanjing's Cube	26	118	517	United States
XXII	2026	Toruń	Poland	20–22 March 2026	Kujawsko-Pomorska Arena Toruń	27	118	674	United States
XXIII	2028	Bhubaneswar	India	3–5 March 2028	Kalinga Stadium				
XXIV	2030	Astana	Kazakhstan	15–17 March 2030	Qazaqstan Indoor Track and Field Arena				

== Outstanding achievements ==
=== Seven gold medals ===
- Mozambique's Maria de Lurdes Mutola won seven gold, one silver and one bronze medal in the women's 800 m from 1993 to 2008.
- Natalya Nazarova has won seven gold and one silver medal from 1999 to 2008 in the 400 m and 4 × 400 m relay.

=== Five gold medals ===
- Iván Pedroso of Cuba won five straight golds in the men's long jump from 1993 to 2001.
- Stefka Kostadinova of Bulgaria won five gold medals in the women's high jump.
- Genzebe Dibaba of Ethiopia won 2 gold medals in the women's 1,500 m and 3 gold medals in the 3,000 m from 2012 to 2018.

=== Four gold medals ===
- Haile Gebrselassie of Ethiopia won three golds in the 3,000 m and one in the 1,500 m.
- Sergey Bubka won four pole vault gold medals (three while competing for the Soviet Union and one for Ukraine).
- Javier Sotomayor of Cuba won four gold and one bronze medal in the men's high jump.
- Stefan Holm of Sweden has won four gold medals in the men's high jump.
- Meseret Defar of Ethiopia has won four gold, one silver and one bronze medal in the women's 3,000 m.
- Mikhail Shchennikov of Russia has won four gold medals in the 5000 m walk.
- Gail Devers of the United States has won 3 golds in 60 m and 1 gold and 1 silver in 60 m hurdles.
- Yelena Isinbayeva of Russia has won 4 golds and 1 silver in pole vault.
- Valerie Adams of New Zealand has won 4 golds and 1 bronze in shot put.
- Armand Duplantis of Sweden has won 4 golds in men's pole vault.
- Tom Walsh of New Zealand has won 4 golds, 1 silver and 2 bronze in shot put.

== Championship records ==
Key to tables: Disqualified or later rescinded

=== Men ===
Event	Record	Athlete	Nation	Date	Championships	Place	Ref.	Video
60 m	6.37	Christian Coleman	United States	3 March 2018	2018 Championships	Birmingham, United Kingdom		
400 m	44.76	Christopher Morales Williams	Canada	21 March 2026	2026 Championships	Toruń, Poland		
800 m	1:42.67	Wilson Kipketer	Denmark	9 March 1997	1997 Championships	Paris, France		
1500 m	3:32.77	Samuel Tefera	Ethiopia	20 March 2022	2022 Championships	Belgrade, Serbia		
3000 m	7:34.71	Haile Gebrselassie	Ethiopia	9 March 1997	1997 Championships	Paris, France		
60 m hurdles	7.29	Grant Holloway	United States	20 March 2022	2022 Championships	Belgrade, Serbia		
60 m hurdles	7.29	Grant Holloway	United States	2 March 2024	2024 Championships	Glasgow, United Kingdom		
High jump	2.43 m	Javier Sotomayor	Cuba	4 March 1989	1989 Championships	Budapest, Hungary		
Pole vault	6.25 m	Armand Duplantis	Sweden	21 March 2026	2026 Championships	Toruń, Poland		
Long jump	8.62 m	Iván Pedroso	Cuba	7 March 1999	1999 Championships	Maebashi, Japan		
Triple jump	17.90 m	Teddy Tamgho	France	14 March 2010	2010 Championships	Doha, Qatar		
Shot put	22.77 m	Ryan Crouser	United States	1 March 2024	2024 Championships	Glasgow, United Kingdom		
Heptathlon	6670 pts	Simon Ehammer	Switzerland	20–21 March 2026	2026 Championships	Toruń, Poland		
Heptathlon	60m / Long jump / Shot put / High jump / 60m H / Pole vault / 1000m; 6.69 / 8.15 m / 14.87 m / 2.02 m / 7.52 / 5.30 m / 2:41.04							
4 × 400 m relay	3:01.52	Justin Robinson; Chris Robinson; Demarius Smith; Khaleb McRae	United States	22 March 2026	2026 Championships	Toruń, Poland		

=== Women ===
Event	Record	Athlete	Nation	Date	Championships	Place	Ref.	Video
60 m	6.95	Gail Devers	United States	12 March 1993	1993 Championships	Toronto, Canada		
400 m	49.17	Femke Bol	Netherlands	2 March 2024	2024 Championships	Glasgow, United Kingdom		
800 m	1:55.30	Keely Hodgkinson	Great Britain	22 March 2026	2026 Championships	Toruń, Poland		
1500 m	3:54.86	Gudaf Tsegay	Ethiopia	23 March 2025	2025 Championships	Nanjing, China		
3000 m	8:20.87	Elle St. Pierre	United States	2 March 2024	2024 Championships	Glasgow, United Kingdom		
60 m hurdles	7.65	Devynne Charlton	Bahamas	22 March 2024	2026 Championships	Toruń, Poland		
High jump	2.05 m	Stefka Kostadinova	Bulgaria	8 March 1987	1987 Championships	Indianapolis, United States		
Pole vault	4.95 m	Sandi Morris	United States	3 March 2018	2018 Championships	Birmingham, United Kingdom		
Long jump	7.23 m	Brittney Reese	United States	11 March 2012	2012 Championships	Istanbul, Turkey		
Triple jump	15.74 m	Yulimar Rojas	Venezuela	20 March 2022	2022 Championships	Belgrade, Serbia		
Shot put	20.67 m	Valerie Adams	New Zealand	8 March 2014	2014 Championships	Sopot, Poland		
Shot put	20.85 m X	Nadzeya Ostapchuk	Belarus	14 March 2010	2010 Championships	Doha, Qatar		
Pentathlon	5013 pts	Nataliya Dobrynska	Ukraine	9 March 2012	2012 Championships	Istanbul, Turkey		
Pentathlon	60m H / High jump / Shot put / Long jump / 800m; 8.38 / 1.84 m / 16.51 m / 6.57 m / 2:11.15							
4 × 400 m relay	3:23.85	Quanera Hayes; Georganne Moline; Shakima Wimbley; Courtney Okolo	United States	4 March 2018	2018 Championships	Birmingham, United Kingdom		

=== Mixed ===
Event	Record	Athlete	Nation	Date	Championships	Place	Ref.
4 × 400 m relay	3:15.60	Jonathan Sacoor; Julien Watrin; Helena Ponette; Ilana Hanssens	Belgium	21 March 2026	2026 Championships	Toruń, Poland	

=== Heptathlon disciplines ===
Event	Record	Athlete	Nation	Date	Championships	Place	Ref.	Video
60 m	6.61	Chris Huffins	United States	8 March 1997	1997 Championships	Paris, France		
Long jump	8.16 m	Ashton Eaton	United States	9 March 2012	2012 Championships	Istanbul, Turkey		
Shot put	17.17 m	Aleksey Drozdov	Russia	12 March 2010	2010 Championships	Doha, Qatar		
High jump	2.21 m	Andrei Krauchanka	Belarus	7 March 2014	2014 Championships	Sopot, Poland		
60 m hurdles	7.52	Simon Ehammer	Switzerland	21 March 2026	2026 Championships	Toruń, Poland		
Pole vault	5.50 m	Erki Nool	Estonia	7 March 1999	1999 Championships	Maebashi, Japan		
1000 m	2:29.04	Curtis Beach	United States	19 March 2016	2016 Championships	Portland, United States		

=== Pentathlon disciplines ===
Event	Record	Athlete	Nation	Date	Championships	Place	Ref.
60 m hurdles	7.91	Jessica Ennis	Great Britain	9 March 2012	2012 Championships	Istanbul, Turkey	
High jump	1.99 m	Tia Hellebaut	Belgium	7 March 2008	2008 Championships	Valencia, Spain	
Shot put	17.18 m	Nataliya Dobrynska	Ukraine	7 March 2008	2008 Championships	Valencia, Spain	
Long jump	6.69 m	Natalya Sazanovich	Belarus	9 March 2001	2001 Championships	Lisbon, Portugal	
Long jump	6.69 m	Kendell Williams	United States	18 March 2022	2022 Championships	Belgrade, Serbia	
800 m	2:06.32	Anna Hall	United States	22 March 2026	2026 Championships	Toruń, Poland	

== Records in defunct events ==
=== Men's events ===
Event	Record	Athlete	Nation	Date	Championships	Place	Ref.
200 m	20.10	Frank Fredericks	Namibia	6 March 1999	1999 Championships	Maebashi, Japan	
5000 m walk	18:23.55	Mikhail Shchennikov	Soviet Union	10 March 1991	1991 Championships	Seville, Spain	
1600m medley relay (non-championship event)	3:15.10	Mark Everett; James Trapp; Kevin Little; Butch Reynolds	United States	14 March 1993	1993 Championships	Toronto, Canada	

=== Women's events ===
Event	Record	Athlete	Nation	Date	Championships	Place	Ref.
200 m	22.15	Irina Privalova	Russia	14 March 1993	1993 Championships	Toronto, Canada	
3000 m walk	11:49.73	Yelena Nikolayeva	Russia	13 March 1993	1993 Championships	Toronto, Canada	
1600m medley relay (non-championship event)	3:45.90	Joetta Clark; Wendy Vereen; Kim Batten; Jearl Miles	United States	14 March 1993	1993 Championships	Toronto, Canada	

== All-time medal table ==
Medal table includes 1985–2026 Championships.

Rank	Nation	Gold	Silver	Bronze	Total
1	United States	130	102	90	322
2	Russia	52	48	45	145
3	Ethiopia	35	17	16	68
4	Great Britain	28	36	35	99
5	Cuba	20	18	17	55
6	Soviet Union	19	17	17	53
7	Jamaica	18	27	20	65
8	France	17	15	23	55
9	Sweden	15	10	10	35
10	Germany	14	23	22	59
11	Ukraine	12	17	12	41
12	Italy	12	11	15	38
13	East Germany	12	7	5	24
14	Canada	12	5	15	32
15	Kenya	10	15	17	42
16	Australia	9	14	13	36
17	Romania	9	10	9	28
18	Netherlands	9	9	10	28
19	Czech Republic	9	8	12	29
20	Bulgaria	9	5	8	22
21	New Zealand	9	4	7	20
22	Bahamas	7	8	10	25
23	Belgium	7	7	1	15
24	Morocco	7	6	8	21
25	Portugal	7	6	7	20
26	Greece	7	4	6	17
27	Mozambique	7	1	1	9
28	Poland	6	15	21	42
29	Switzerland	6	6	6	18
30	Ireland	6	3	3	12
31	Brazil	5	6	6	17
32	Spain	4	23	22	49
33	South Africa	4	4	3	11
34	Norway	4	3	3	10
35	Belarus	3	12	8	23
36	China	3	8	9	20
37	Kazakhstan	3	5	2	10
38	Venezuela	3	1	0	4
39	Nigeria	2	7	3	12
40	Czechoslovakia	2	4	2	8
41	Hungary	2	2	4	8
42	West Germany	2	2	3	7
43	Serbia	2	2	1	5
44	Burundi	2	2	0	4
45	Croatia	2	1	3	6
46	Sudan	2	1	1	4
47	Finland	2	1	0	3
–	Authorised Neutral Athletes^{[1]}	2	1	0	3
48	South Korea	2	0	2	4
49	Grenada	2	0	0	2
50	Qatar	1	3	2	6
51	Denmark	1	3	1	5
52	Ivory Coast	1	3	0	4
53	Trinidad and Tobago	1	2	6	9
54	Bahrain	1	1	3	5
55	Algeria	1	1	2	4
56	Bermuda	1	1	1	3
57	Ghana	1	1	0	2
57	Namibia	1	1	0	2
59	Burkina Faso	1	0	1	2
59	Saint Lucia	1	0	1	2
61	Costa Rica	1	0	0	1
61	Djibouti	1	0	0	1
61	Dominica	1	0	0	1
64	Austria	0	4	0	4
65	Slovenia	0	3	5	8
66	Estonia	0	3	2	5
67	Iceland	0	2	1	3
68	Cameroon	0	2	0	2
68	Saint Kitts and Nevis	0	2	0	2
70	Mexico	0	1	2	3
71	Barbados	0	1	1	2
71	Latvia	0	1	1	2
73	Botswana	0	1	0	1
73	Cayman Islands	0	1	0	1
73	Panama	0	1	0	1
73	Turkey	0	1	0	1
73	U.S. Virgin Islands	0	1	0	1
78	Japan	0	0	3	3
79	Lithuania	0	0	2	2
79	Senegal	0	0	2	2
79	Serbia and Montenegro	0	0	2	2
82	Antigua and Barbuda	0	0	1	1
82	Benin	0	0	1	1
82	British Virgin Islands	0	0	1	1
82	Chile	0	0	1	1
82	Colombia	0	0	1	1
82	Cyprus	0	0	1	1
82	DR Congo	0	0	1	1
82	Dominican Republic	0	0	1	1
82	Luxembourg	0	0	1	1
82	Saudi Arabia	0	0	1	1
82	Suriname	0	0	1	1
82	Uganda	0	0	1	1
Totals (93 entries)		587	599	603	1,789

Notes

^[a] ANA was the name, under which Russian athletes competed in the 2018 Championships. Their medals were not included in the official medal table.

== All-time placing table ==
In the World Athletics placing table the total score is obtained from assigning eight points to the first place and so on to one point for the eight place. Points are shared in situations where a tie occurs.

Updated after 2022 Championships

Rank	Country	1st place, gold medalist(s)	2nd place, silver medalist(s)	3rd place, bronze medalist(s)	4	5	6	7	8	Medals	Points
1	United States	113	81+1	73+2	69+1	51+4	40+3	34+2	32	270	2724
2	Russia^{[2]}	51+1	40+3	36+1	25+1	34	29+1	20+1	9	132	1341
3	Germany^{[3]}	24	27	29+2	28+1	31+2	20+2	18	21+3	82	964.5
4	Great Britain	18	27+1	27+1	21+1	23+1	26+3	14	11+1	74	836.5
5	Jamaica	17	22	12+1	16+1	20	14	5	5	52	589
6	Cuba	9	15	12+1	12	20+2	10	16+1	7	47	552
7	France	13	9	17+1	14	13+1	17+2	15	14	40	500
8	Ethiopia	30	11	12	12	6	5	3	2	53	496
9	Spain	2	19	15	16+1	17+2	17	15+1	13+1	36	494.5
10	Poland	4+1	12	15+1	25	8+2	18+3	5	8	33	462.5

Notes

^[b]Does not include results achieved by Authorized Neutral Athletes in 2018.
^[c]Includes results achieved by East Germany and West Germany between 1987 and 1989.

== Multiple medallists ==
A total of 8 men and 19 women have won five or more medals at the competition.

=== Men ===
Name	Country	Years	Total	Gold	Silver	Bronze
Javier Sotomayor	Cuba	1985-1999	6	4	1	1
Chris Brown	Bahamas	2006-2016	6	1	2	3
Iván Pedroso	Cuba	1993-2001	5	5	0	0
Bernard Lagat	Kenya / United States	2003-2014	5	3	2	0
Tom Walsh	New Zealand	2014-2024	5	2	1	2
Roman Šebrle	Czech Republic	1999-2006	5	2	0	3
Yaroslav Rybakov	Russia	2003-2010	5	1	4	0
Jamie Baulch	United Kingdom	1997-2003	5	1	2	2

=== Women ===
Name	Country	Years	Total	Gold	Silver	Bronze
Maria Mutola	Mozambique	1993-2008	9	7	1	1
Natalya Nazarova	Russia	1999-2008	8	7	1	0
Meseret Defar	Ethiopia	2003-2016	7	4	2	1
Sandie Richards	Jamaica	1993-2003	7	3	4	0
Merlene Ottey	Jamaica / Slovenia	1987-2003	7	3	2	2
Olesya Zykina	Russia	2001-2008	6	5	0	1
Gail Devers	United States	1993-2004	6	4	2	0
Svetlana Goncharenko	Russia	1995-2004	6	3	2	1
Jearl Miles Clark	United States	1991-1999	6	2	1	3
Stefka Kostadinova	Bulgaria	1985-1997	5	5	0	0
Genzebe Dibaba	Ethiopia	2012-2018	5	5	0	0
Gabriela Szabo	Romania	1995-2001	5	4	1	0
Yelena Isinbayeva	Russia	2003-2012	5	4	1	0
Olga Kotlyarova	Russia	1997-2004	5	4	1	0
Valerie Adams	New Zealand	2008-2016	5	4	0	1
Irina Privalova	Russia	1991-1995	5	3	2	0
Natasha Hastings	United States	2010-2016	5	3	1	1
Grit Breuer	Germany	1991-2003	5	2	0	3
Svetlana Feofanova	Russia	2001-2010	5	1	2	2

== See also ==
- International Athletics Championships and Games
