= Adam Helcelet =

Czech athlete (born 1991)

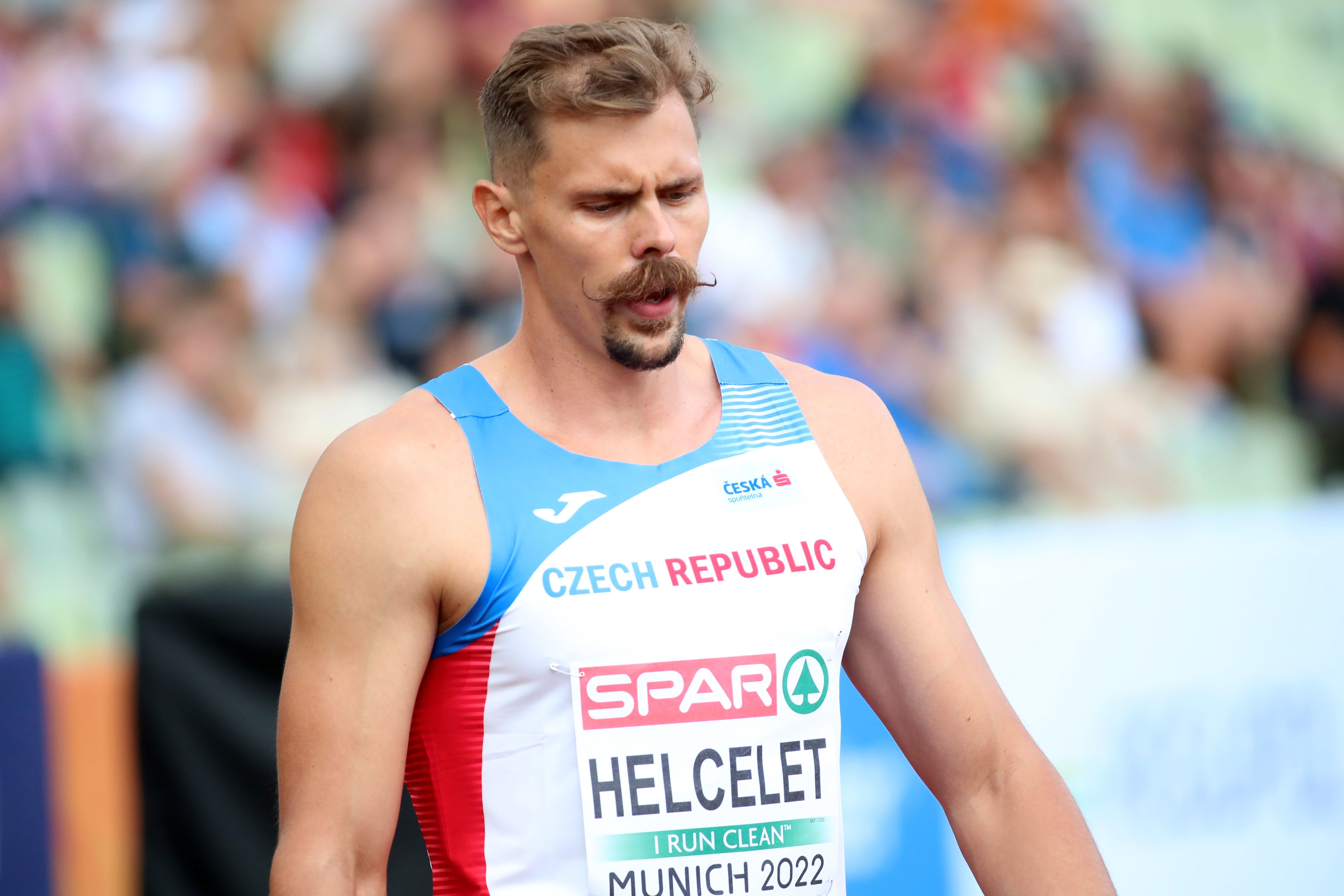
- Helcelet in 2022

Personal information
- Full name: Adam Sebastian Helcelet
- Born: 27 October 1991 (age 34) Turnov, Czechoslovakia
- Height: 1.90 m (6 ft 3 in)
- Weight: 92 kg (203 lb)

Sport
- Country: Czech Republic
- Sport: Athletics
- Event: Decathlon
Medal record
European Championships
Silver medal – second place	2016 Amsterdam	Decathlon
European Indoor Championships
Bronze medal – third place	2017 Belgrade	Heptathlon

Adam Sebastian Helcelet (Czech pronunciation: [ˈadam ˈsɛbastɪjan ˈɦɛltsɛlɛt]; born 27 October 1991) is a Czech retired athlete who competed in the decathlon. He competed at the 2016 Summer Olympics.

== International competitions ==
Year	Competition	Venue	Position	Event	Notes
Representing the Czech Republic
2009	European Junior Championships	Novi Sad, Serbia	8th	Decathlon (junior)	7286 pts
2010	World Junior Championships	Moncton, Canada	–	Decathlon (junior)	DNF
2011	European U23 Championships	Ostrava, Czech Republic	4th	Decathlon	7966 pts
2012	World Indoor Championships	Istanbul, Turkey	5th	Heptathlon	5878 pts
2013	European Indoor Championships	Gothenburg, Sweden	4th	Heptathlon	6095 pts
2013	European U23 Championships	Tampere, Finland	3rd	Decathlon	8252 pts
2014	European Championships	Zurich, Switzerland	11th	Decathlon	7955 pts
2015	European Indoor Championships	Prague, Czech Republic	5th	Heptathlon	6031 pts
2015	World Championships	Beijing, China	11th	Decathlon	8234 pts
2016	World Indoor Championships	Portland, United States	5th	Heptathlon	6003 pts
2016	European Championships	Amsterdam, Netherlands	2nd	Decathlon	8157 pts
2016	Olympic Games	Rio de Janeiro, Brazil	12th	Decathlon	8291 pts
2017	European Indoor Championships	Belgrade, Serbia	3rd	Heptathlon	6110 pts
2017	World Championships	London, United Kingdom	8th	Decathlon	8222 pts
2021	Olympic Games	Tokyo, Japan	16th	Decathlon	8004 pts
2022	European Championships	Munich, Germany	11th	Decathlon	8000 pts
