= Artem Lukyanenko =

Russian decathlete

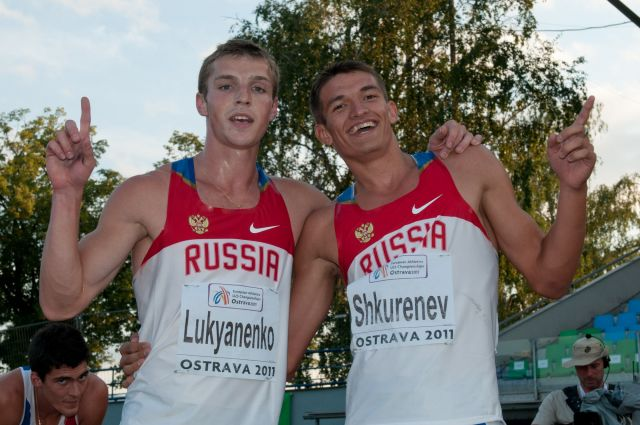
- Artem Lukyanenko, left with Ilya Shkurenyov

Personal information
- Nationality: Russian
- Born: 30 January 1990 (age 36)

Sport
- Country: Russia
- Sport: Men's athletics
- Event: Decathlon
Medal record
World Indoor Championships
Bronze medal – third place	2012 Istanbul	Heptathlon

Artem Lukyanenko (Russian: Артём Лукьяненко; born 30 January 1990) is a Russian decathlete. His personal best score is 7869 points, achieved in 2011. He got bronze medal at 2012 IAAF World Indoor Championships in Istanbul, Turkey.

== International competitions ==
Representing Russia
Year	Competition	Venue	Position	Event	Notes
2011	European U23 Championships	Ostrava, Czech Republic	11th	Decathlon	7577 pts
2011	European U23 Championships	Ostrava, Czech Republic	3rd^{†}	4 × 400 m relay	3:07.79 (h)^{†}
2012	World Indoor Championships	Istanbul, Turkey	3rd	Heptathlon	5969 pts
2012	European Championships	Helsinki, Finland	–	Decathlon	DNF
2015	European Indoor Championships	Prague, Czech Republic	10th	Heptathlon	5857 pts

^{†}: Competed only in heat.
