= 2010 World Junior Championships in Athletics – Men's decathlon =

The men's decathlon event at the 2010 World Junior Championships in Athletics was held in Moncton, New Brunswick, Canada, at Moncton Stadium on 20 and 21 July. Junior implements were used, i.e. 99.0 cm (3'3) hurdles, 6 kg shot and 1.75 kg discus.

== Medalists ==
Gold	Kévin Mayer; France
Silver	Ilya Shkurenev; Russia
Bronze	Marcus Nilsson; Sweden

== Results ==
=== Final ===
20/21 July

The highest mark recorded in each event is highlighted in yellow

Rank	Name	Nationality	100m	LJ	SP	HJ	400m	110m H	DT	PV	JT	1500m	Points	Notes
1st place, gold medalist(s)	Kévin Mayer	France	11.12 (w: 1.3 m/s)	7.41	14.01	2.04	49.39	14.21 (w: 0.9 m/s)	37.57	4.70	49.76	4:21.35	7928	
2nd place, silver medalist(s)	Ilya Shkurenev	Russia	11.25 (w: 1.3 m/s)	7.26	13.48	2.01	50.46	14.81 (w: 0.2 m/s)	43.15	5.00	55.49	4:42.92	7830	
3rd place, bronze medalist(s)	Marcus Nilsson	Sweden	11.30 (w: 0.5 m/s)	6.93	14.55	1.92	49.54	14.75 (w: 0.2 m/s)	45.18	4.60	51.64	4:25.31	7751	
4	David Guest	United Kingdom	10.90 (w: 0.3 m/s)	7.36	13.14	1.95	49.11	14.25 (w: 0.9 m/s)	40.36	4.60	44.62	4:36.13	7691	
5	José Angel Mendieta	Cuba	10.97 (w: 1.3 m/s)	7.28	15.20	1.95	50.99	14.93 (w: 0.9 m/s)	41.21	4.00	63.20	4:45.04	7677	
6	Kai Kazmirek	Germany	10.96 (w: 1.3 m/s)	6.87	13.25	1.95	47.63	14.41 (w: 0.2 m/s)	40.15	4.50	53.07	4:47.48	7638	
7	Jérémy Lelièvre	France	11.02 (w: 0.3 m/s)	7.18	14.41	1.92	49.32	14.99 (w: 1.4 m/s)	36.24	4.50	52.29	4:36.65	7568	
8	Petter Olson	Sweden	11.09 (w: 1.3 m/s)	6.92	14.18	1.92	49.48	14.72 (w: 0.9 m/s)	39.80	4.60	44.92	4:33.41	7515	
9	Michal Štefek	Czech Republic	10.96 (w: 1.3 m/s)	7.02	13.71	1.98	49.76	14.85 (w: 1.4 m/s)	35.89	4.40	51.95	4:36.33	7512	
10	Jonay Jordan	Spain	11.33 (w: 0.5 m/s)	6.73	15.86	1.95	50.70	14.57 (w: 0.2 m/s)	38.67	4.30	45.75	5:01.55	7242	
11	Nikita Semenenko	Russia	11.80 (w: 0.3 m/s)	6.48	15.52	2.01	52.85	15.44 (w: 1.4 m/s)	41.02	4.20	55.11	4:47.66	7160	
12	Neamen Wise	United States	10.84 (w: 0.3 m/s)	7.29	12.11	1.92	50.33	14.97 (w: 0.9 m/s)	39.78	3.80	49.24	5:00.45	7132	
13	Martin Roe	Norway	11.20 (w: 1.3 m/s)	6.90	14.16	1.83	51.94	16.28 (w: 1.4 m/s)	42.35	4.10	56.22	4:54.72	7056	
14	Kevin Lazas	United States	11.26 (w: 1.3 m/s)	6.88	14.07	1.89	52.46	15.86 (w: 1.4 m/s)	34.45	4.40	53.37	4:49.19	7028	
15	Dominik Alberto	Switzerland	11.08 (w: 0.5 m/s)	6.43	13.89	1.83	50.81	14.91 (w: 0.9 m/s)	38.76	4.40	49.10	5:02.82	7027	
16	Ashley Bryant	United Kingdom	11.02 (w: 1.3 m/s)	7.11	13.56	DNF	49.53	14.38 (w: 0.2 m/s)	41.66	4.20	65.00	4:47.86	6975	
17	Jeroen Vanmulder	Belgium	11.25 (w: 1.3 m/s)	6.99	11.57	1.89	50.52	16.19 (w: 0.2 m/s)	35.83	3.90	46.66	4:39.64	6796	
18	Jared Heldman	Canada	10.90 (w: 0.5 m/s)	7.24	13.17	1.77	50.28	14.99 (w: 1.4 m/s)	30.50	3.70	39.25	5:05.13	6658	
19	Eetu Taskinen	Finland	11.53 (w: 1.3 m/s)	5.99	13.40	1.77	DQ	15.67 (w: 0.2 m/s)	42.02	4.00	57.65	5:11.39	5916	
20	Taavi Saar	Estonia	11.52 (w: 1.3 m/s)	6.27	13.36	1.80	53.05	15.89 (w: 0.2 m/s)	35.53	DNF	46.02	5:25.36	5661	
21	Taavi Sarapuu	Estonia	11.63 (w: 0.3 m/s)	6.68	12.90	1.86	54.56	15.96 (w: 1.4 m/s)	NM	4.40	NM	5:05.95	5415	
22	Gert Swanepoel	South Africa	11.52 (w: 0.3 m/s)	6.29	11.01	1.83	50.69	DQ	27.01	DNS	45.42	4:34.30	5024	
	Mathias Brugger	Germany	11.19 (w: 0.5 m/s)	7.08	14.15	1.95	50.01	DNF	DNS	DNS	DNS	DNS	DNF	
	Otto Ylöstalo	Finland	11.68 (w: 0.5 m/s)	6.81	13.54	1.83	54.23	DNS	DNS	DNS	DNS	DNS	DNF	
	Adam Helcelet	Czech Republic	10.96 (w: 0.3 m/s)	6.93	13.75	DNS	DNS	DNS	DNS	DNS	DNS	DNS	DNF	
	Mohamed R.A. Al-Mannai	Qatar	11.55 (w: 1.3 m/s)	7.00	11.94	DNS	DNS	DNS	DNS	DNS	DNS	DNS	DNF	

== Participation ==
According to an unofficial count, 26 athletes from 17 countries participated in the event.

- Belgium (1)
- Canada (1)
- Cuba (1)
- Czech Republic (2)
- Estonia (2)
- Finland (2)
- France (2)
- Germany (2)
- Norway (1)
- Qatar (1)
- Russia (2)
- South Africa (1)
- Spain (1)
- Sweden (2)
- Switzerland (1)
- United Kingdom (2)
- United States (2)
