= 2009 European Athletics Indoor Championships – Men's heptathlon =

The Men's heptathlon event at the 2009 European Athletics Indoor Championships was held on March 7–8.

Mikk Pahapill won gold with Estonia.

== Medalists ==
Gold	Silver	Bronze
Mikk Pahapill; Estonia	Oleksiy Kasyanov; Ukraine	Roman Šebrle; Czech Republic

== Results ==
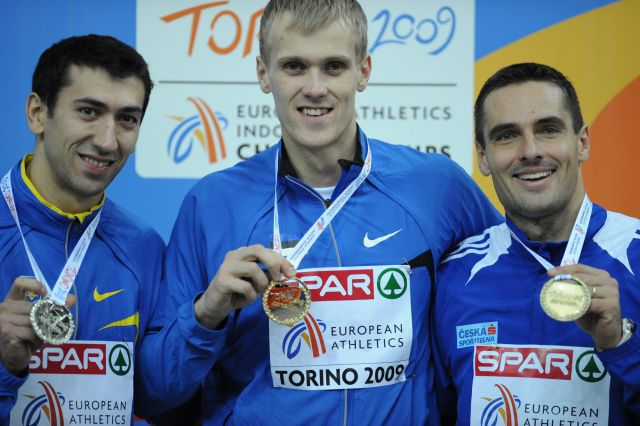
Left to right: Oleksiy Kasyanov, Mikk Pahapill, Roman Šebrle

The highest mark recorded in each event is highlighted in yellow

Rank	Athlete	Nationality	60m	LJ	SP	HJ	60m H	PV	1000m	Points	Notes
1st place, gold medalist(s)	Mikk Pahapill	Estonia	7.09	7.97	15.45	2.12	8.03	5.10	2:45.69	6362	PB
2nd place, silver medalist(s)	Oleksiy Kasyanov	Ukraine	6.83	7.85	14.51	2.06	7.99	4.60	2:42.48	6205	NR
3rd place, bronze medalist(s)	Roman Šebrle	Czech Republic	7.17	7.72	15.14	2.09	8.24	5.00	2:45.60	6142	SB
4	Aleksey Drozdov	Russia	7.09	7.24	16.57	2.09	8.39	5.00	2:45.81	6101	SB
5	André Niklaus	Germany	7.21	7.39	14.95	2.03	8.01	4.80	2:45.04	5981	SB
6	William Frullani	Italy	7.17	7.66	14.90	2.06	8.32	4.90	2:51.70	5972	NR
7	Franck Logel	France	7.00	7.34	12.74	2.03	8.40	5.00	2:40.12	5926	
8	Gaël Quérin	France	7.10	7.22	13.03	1.97	8.15	4.80	2:34.53	5886	PB
9	Eugène Martineau	Netherlands	7.18	7.40	13.63	2.00	8.33	5.00	2:43.36	5884	PB
10	Roland Schwarzl	Austria	7.29	7.59	14.55	1.97	8.17	4.80	2:47.29	5859	SB
11	Andres Raja	Estonia	7.08	7.37	14.15	2.00	8.13	4.70	2:53.09	5800	
12	Yevhen Nikitin	Ukraine	7.13	6.91	14.12	1.91	8.51	4.80	2:42.65	5639	
13	Agustín Félix	Spain	7.21	7.19	13.71	2.03	8.27	4.70	2:58.44	5624	
	Eelco Sintnicolaas	Netherlands	6.99	7.51	12.35	1.91	7.98	–	–	DNF	
	Aleksandr Kislov	Russia	7.07	NM	–	–	–	–	–	DNF	
