= Petter Olson =

Swedish decathlete

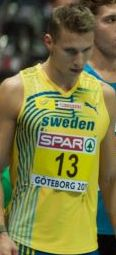
- Petter Olson at the 2013 European Indoor Championships

Personal information
- Nationality: Swedish
- Born: 14 February 1991 (age 35)
- Height: 1.83 m (6 ft 0 in)
- Weight: 79 kg (174 lb) (2015)

Sport
- Sport: Track and field
- Event: Decathlon
- College team: University of Texas
- Club: Hässelby SK

Petter Olson (born 14 February 1991) is a Swedish athlete competing in the combined events. He won the silver medal at the 2009 European Junior Championships. As a senior, he competed at one outdoor and two indoor European Championships.

He also sometimes competes in the 400 metres hurdles, twice becoming the Swedish champion in that event.

== Competition record ==
Year	Competition	Venue	Position	Event	Notes
Representing Sweden
2007	World Youth Championships	Ostrava, Czech Republic	17th (q)	Pole vault	4.45 m
2009	European Junior Championships	Novi Sad, Serbia	2nd	Decathlon (junior)	7734 pts
2010	World Junior Championships	Moncton, Canada	8th	Decathlon (junior)	7515 pts
2011	European U23 Championships	Ostrava, Czech Republic	8th	Decathlon	7724 pts
2012	European Championships	Helsinki, Finland	10th	Decathlon	7771 pts
2013	European Indoor Championships	Gothenburg, Sweden	13th	Heptathlon	4933 pts
2013	European U23 Championships	Tampere, Finland	–	Decathlon	DNF
2015	European Indoor Championships	Helsinki, Finland	8th	Heptathlon	5869 pts
2016	World Indoor Championships	Portland, United States	10th	Heptathlon	5697 pts

== Personal bests ==
Outdoor
- 100 metres – 10.70 (+1.9 m/s) (Ribeira Brava 2014)
- 200 metres – 22.04 (+1.3 m/s) (Karlstad 2011)
- 400 metres – 48.36 (Ostrava 2011)
- 1500 metres – 4:26.29 (Ostrava 2011)
- 110 metres hurdles – 14.39 (-1.5 m/s) (Ribeira Brava 2014)
- 400 metres hurdles – 52.62 (Stockholm 2014)
- High jump – 2.00 (Götzis 2010)
- Pole vault – 5.05 (Helsinki 2008)
- Long jump – 7.19 (+0.4 m/s) (Ribeira Brava 2014)
- Shot put – 13.60 (Austin 2012)
- Discus throw – 41.29 (Des Moines 2012)
- Javelin throw – 57.13 (Austin 2012)
- Decathlon – 7857 (Austin 2012)
Indoor
- 60 metres – 6.98 (Gothenburg 2013)
- 1000 metres – 2:39.97 (Nampa 2012)
- 60 metres hurdles – 8.06 (Norrköping 2015)
- High jump – 2.02 (Norrköping 2011)
- Pole vault – 5.14 (Västerås 2009)
- Long jump – 7.13 (Nampa 2012)
- Shot put – 14.19 (Växjö 2014)
- Heptathlon – 5904 (Växjö 2014)
