= Oleksiy Kasyanov =

Ukrainian decathlete

Oleksiy Kasyanov Oleksii Kasianov
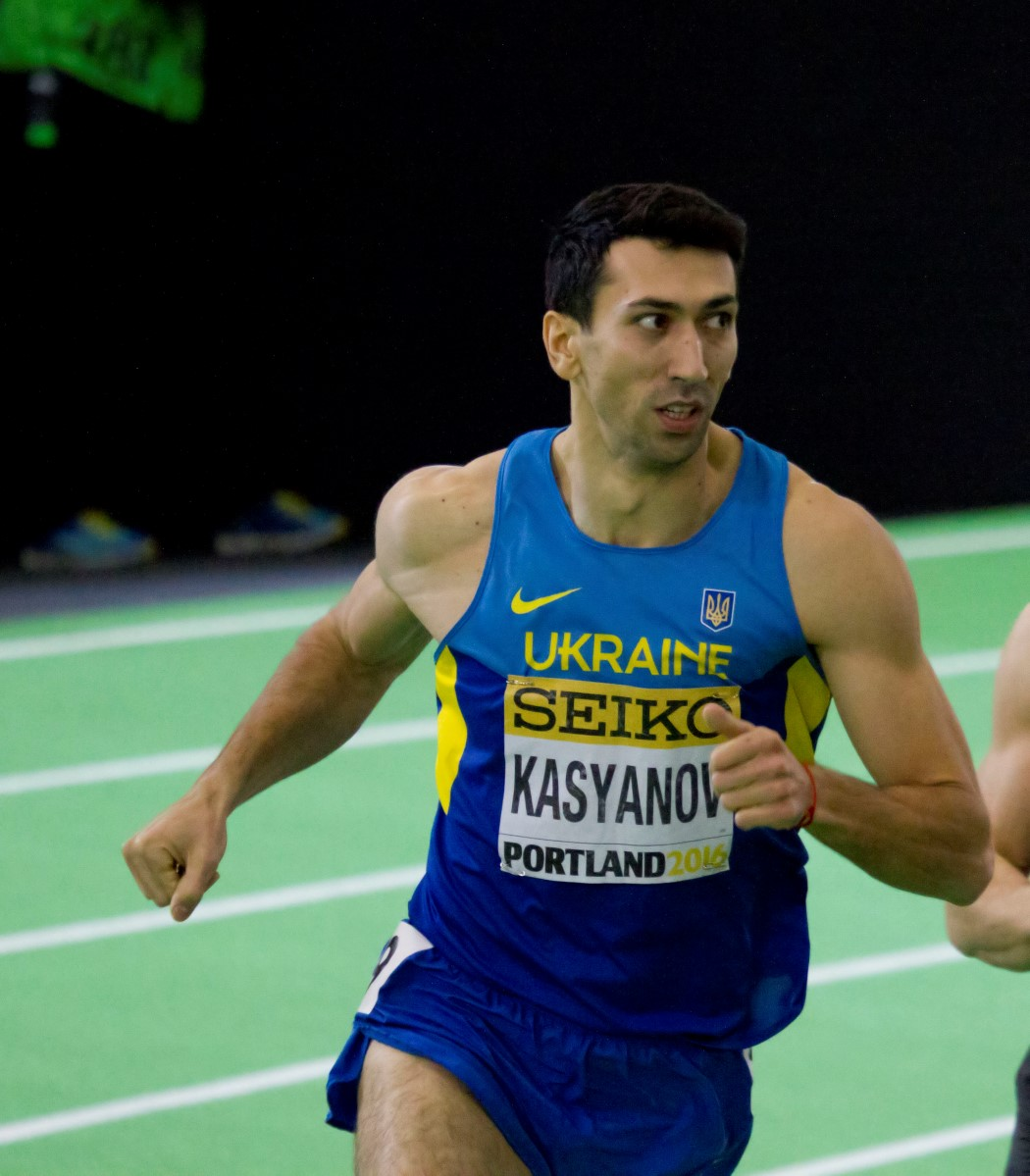

Personal information
- Born: August 26, 1985 (age 40)
- Height: 1.91 m (6 ft 3 in)
- Weight: 88 kg (194 lb)

Sport
- Country: Ukraine
- Sport: Athletics
- Event: Decathlon
Medal record
World Championships
Bronze medal – third place	2009 Berlin	Decathlon
World Indoor Championships
Silver medal – second place	2012 Istanbul	Heptathlon
Silver medal – second place	2016 Portland	Heptathlon
European Championships
Silver medal – second place	2012 Helsinki	Decathlon
European Indoor Championships
Silver medal – second place	2009 Turin	Heptathlon

Oleksiy Kasyanov or Oleksii Serhiiovych Kasianov (Ukrainian: Олексій Сергійович Касьянов; born 26 August 1985 in Stakhanov (now Kadiivka, Ukraine) is a Ukrainian decathlete.

== Career ==
His personal best score is 8479 points, achieved at the 2009 World Championships in Berlin, Germany. He won the 2010 TNT-Fortuna Meeting in Kladno with a total of 8381 points, leading from the first day onwards with the help of a 14.24 seconds personal best in the 110 metres hurdles.

== Personal life ==
Since 2014, he is married to Ukrainian heptathlete Hanna Melnychenko.

== Competition record ==
Year	Competition	Venue	Position	Event	Notes
Representing Ukraine
2007	European U23 Championships	Debrecen, Hungary	4th	Decathlon	7964 pts
2007	Universiade	Bangkok, Thailand	4th	Decathlon	7858 pts
2008	Olympic Games	Beijing, China	7th	Decathlon	8238 pts
2009	European Indoor Championships	Turin, Italy	2nd	Heptathlon	6205 pts
2009	Hypo-Meeting	Götzis, Austria	5th	Decathlon	8286 pts
2009	World Championships	Berlin, Germany	3rd	Decathlon	8479 pts
2010	World Indoor Championships	Doha, Qatar	6th	Heptathlon	6019 pts
2010	European Championships	Barcelona, Spain	–	Decathlon	DNF
2011	World Championships	Daegu, South Korea	12th	Decathlon	8132 pts
2012	World Indoor Championships	Istanbul, Turkey	2nd	Heptathlon	6071 pts
2012	European Championships	Helsinki, Finland	2nd	Decathlon	8321 pts
2012	Olympic Games	London, United Kingdom	7th	Decathlon	8283 pts
2013	World Championships	Moscow, Russia	–	Decathlon	DNF
2014	World Indoor Championships	Sopot, Poland	5th	Heptathlon	6176 pts
2014	European Championships	Zürich, Switzerland	8th	Decathlon	8231 pts
2015	World Championships	Beijing, China	9th	Decathlon	8262 pts
2016	World Indoor Championships	Portland, United States	2nd	Heptathlon	6182 pts
2016	European Championships	Amsterdam, Netherlands	4th	Decathlon	8072 pts
2016	Olympic Games	Rio de Janeiro, Brazil	–	Decathlon	DNF
2017	World Championships	London, United Kingdom	6th	Decathlon	8234 pts
2018	World Indoor Championships	Birmingham, United Kingdom	–	Heptathlon	DNF
2019	European Indoor Championships	Glasgow, United Kingdom	25th (h)	60 m hurdles	7.98
