= Ashton Eaton =

American decathlete (born 1988)

Ashton Eaton OLY
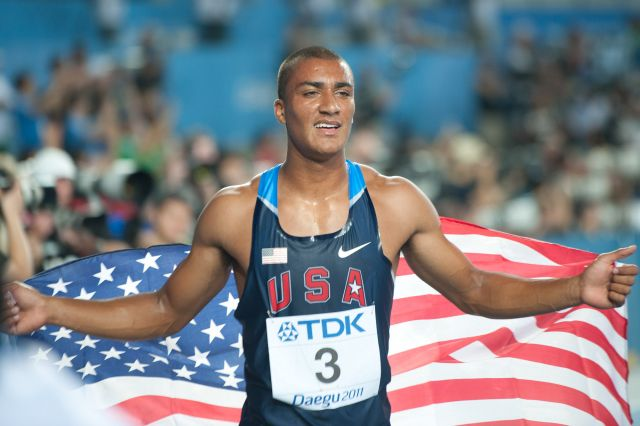
- Eaton in 2011

Personal information
- Full name: Ashton James Eaton
- Born: January 21, 1988 (age 38) Portland, Oregon, U.S.
- Height: 6 ft 1 in (185 cm)
- Weight: 180 lb (82 kg)

Sport
- Country: United States
- Sport: Track and field
- Events: Decathlon, heptathlon
- Club: Oregon Track Club
- Coached by: Harry Marra

Achievements and titles
- Personal bests: Decathlon: 9,045; Heptathlon: 6,645
Medal record
Men's athletics
Representing the United States
| Event | 1st | 2nd | 3rd |
|---|---|---|---|
| Olympic Games | 2 | 0 | 0 |
| World Championships | 2 | 1 | 0 |
| World Indoor Championships | 3 | 0 | 0 |
| Total | 7 | 1 | 0 |
Olympic Games
| Gold medal – first place | 2012 London | Decathlon |
| Gold medal – first place | 2016 Rio de Janeiro | Decathlon |
World Championships
| Gold medal – first place | 2013 Moscow | Decathlon |
| Gold medal – first place | 2015 Beijing | Decathlon |
| Silver medal – second place | 2011 Daegu | Decathlon |
World Indoor Championships
| Gold medal – first place | 2012 Istanbul | Heptathlon |
| Gold medal – first place | 2014 Sopot | Heptathlon |
| Gold medal – first place | 2016 Portland | Heptathlon |

Ashton James Eaton (born January 21, 1988) is a retired American decathlete and two-time Olympic champion, who previously held the world record in the decathlon and indoor heptathlon event. Eaton was the second decathlete (after Roman Šebrle) to break the 9,000-point barrier in the decathlon, with 9,039 points, a score he bettered on August 29, 2015, when he beat his own world record with a score of 9,045 points, and remains the only person to exceed 9,000 points twice. His world record was broken on September 16, 2018, by Frenchman Kevin Mayer, who became the third man to pass the 9,000-point barrier, with a total of 9,126 points.

He competed for the Oregon Track Club Elite team based in Eugene, Oregon. In college, Eaton competed for the University of Oregon, where he was a five-time NCAA champion, and won The Bowerman award in 2010. In 2011, Eaton won the first international medal of his career, a silver, in the decathlon at the 2011 World Championships. The following year, Eaton broke his own world record in the heptathlon at the 2012 World Indoor Championships, and then broke the world record in the decathlon at the Olympic Trials. After setting the world record, Eaton won the gold medal at the 2012 Summer Olympics in London. He successfully defended his Olympic title at the 2016 Summer Olympics by winning the decathlon gold medal and tying the Olympic record. Eaton is only the third Olympian (after Bob Mathias of the US and Great Britain's Daley Thompson) to achieve back-to-back gold medals in the decathlon.

== Early life and education ==
Eaton was born in Portland, Oregon, on January 21, 1988, the only child of Roslyn Eaton and Terrance Wilson. His father is Black and his mother is White.

His maternal grandfather, Jim Eaton, played football at Michigan State University, and his father also played the sport. His mother was an athlete and a dancer. He has three paternal siblings, including Verice Bennett, a first sergeant in the United States Marine Corps, who received the Silver Star in December 2011 for serving with valor in Afghanistan.

Eaton's parents separated when he was two years old. His mother, Roslyn, moved to La Pine, Oregon. He was athletic from a young age, competing in football, basketball, track, soccer, and wrestling, and also earned a black belt in taekwondo. When Eaton was in the fifth grade, he and his mother relocated to Bend, Oregon, where he later attended Mountain View High School. Interested in track and field, he was coached by Tate Metcalf and John Nosler. In 2006, he won the Oregon state high school 400 m championship in 48.69 seconds and the long jump championship with 24 feet 0.25 inches (7.3216 m).

Only a few colleges recruited Eaton. He considered playing football at a Division III college. In the spring of 2006, Metcalf asked Eaton if he would consider the decathlon while in college. Metcalf suggested that Eaton attend a university with a strong decathlon program, and Eaton chose the University of Oregon.

== Sports career ==
=== Collegiate career ===
Eaton was initially coached at Oregon by Dan Steele, the associate director of track and a former decathlete. Under Steele, Eaton rapidly improved in the 1500 m, high jump, hurdles, and pole vault. He improved his pole vault by nearly 4 feet (1.2 m) in one year, and reached 8,000 points by his sixth collegiate decathlon. After Steele left in 2010 to coach at the University of Northern Iowa, the university hired decathlon coach Harry Marra (who had trained Olympic decathletes Dan O'Brien and Dave Johnson) to further develop Eaton's skills.

In his first year as an Oregon Duck 2006–07, Eaton was one of only three freshmen nationwide to qualify provisionally for NCAAs in the combined events, both indoors and outdoors. He finished second in the Pac-10 Championships decathlon with a season-best 7,123 points in only his second career decathlon. He then placed third at the USA Junior Championships decathlon (7,155 points) and second in the long jump (24–0.25), the latter of which earned him a trip to Brazil for the 2007 Pan American Junior Championships.

In 2008, Eaton won the decathlon at the NCAA Men's Outdoor Track and Field Championship.

In 2009, Eaton defended his decathlon title at the NCAA Championships to win with 8,241 points. He also won the heptathlon title at the 2009 NCAA Indoor Championships with 5,988 points. Eaton won the Division I field athlete of the year award in 2009.

At the 2010 NCAA Indoor Championships, Eaton broke the heptathlon world record with a score of 6,499, eclipsing Dan O'Brien's 17-year-old mark by 23 points. In June 2010, he won his third consecutive NCAA decathlon title by finishing first in the decathlon with a personal best of 8,457 points. He was the first male athlete to win 3 consecutive titles in the decathlon. In 2010, Eaton won The Bowerman, given annually to the best male and female U.S. collegiate track and field athletes. Eaton graduated from the University of Oregon the same year.

=== 2008–2009 ===
At the 2008 United States Olympic Trials, Eaton placed fifth overall with 8,122 points.

At the 2009 USA Outdoor Track and Field Championships, Eaton placed second in the decathlon behind Trey Hardee with 8,075 points. This earned him a place at the 2009 World Championships in Athletics, in Berlin, where he finished 18th with 8,061 points.

=== 2011–2012 ===
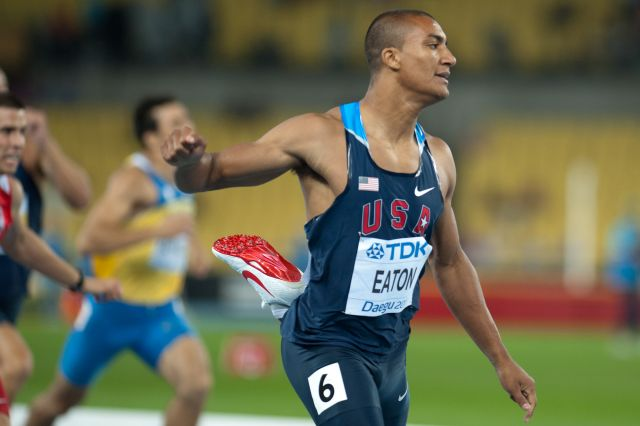
Eaton at the 2011 World Athletics Championships

Eaton improved his own world record in the indoor heptathlon at the International Indoor Combined Events Meeting in Tallinn in February 2011. Despite under-performing in the high jump, he managed a score of 6568 points.

In August 2011, at the 2011 World Championships in Athletics, Eaton won the silver medal in the decathlon competition with a final points tally of 8505, losing first place to his compatriot Trey Hardee.

In March 2012, at the 2012 IAAF World Indoor Championships held in Istanbul, Eaton won the gold medal in the heptathlon competition with a new world record of 6645 points, winning five events (60 m, 60 m hurdles, long jump, pole vault and 1000 m) out of seven and finished third for the rest (high jump and shot put). His stand-out events were the Long Jump (scoring 1,102 points with a jump of 8.16m/26' 9-1/4") and the final event, the 1,000 m run, where he set a Championship record of 2:32.78 (only one-tenth of a second off his personal best time). He defeated silver medal winner Oleksiy Kasyanov by 574 points (6071).

| Heptathlon | 6645 pts | Ashton Eaton (United States) | March 9–10, 2012 | 2012 IAAF World Indoor Championships | Istanbul, Turkey |
| Heptathlon | 60m / Long jump / Shot put / High jump / 60m H / Pole vault / 1000m; 6.79 / 8.16 m / 14.56 m / 2.03 m / 7.68 / 5.20 m / 2:32.78 | | | | |

=== 2012 Summer Olympics ===
Trials

At the 2012 United States Olympic Trials, the qualifying meet for the 2012 Summer Olympics, Eaton started day one of the decathlon competition with two world decathlon bests, the equivalent of a world record for athletes competing in a full decathlon. The first in the 100-meter (10.21), and then in the long jump (8.23 m (27 ft 0 in)). To emphasize the quality of Eaton's first two marks, the 100-meter time equaled the minimum (season wide) time required for men to qualify for the trials 100-meter race and only .03 short of the Olympic "A" standard. The long jump was 10 inches (25 cm) farther than the top qualifier in the long jump preliminary round held that same day at the trials, 3 centimetres (1.2 in) beyond the "A" standard, and would have tied for second in the final. He went on to finish fifth in the shot put (14.20 m (46 ft 7 in)), first in the high jump (2.05 m (6 ft 8 1/2 in)), and first in the 400 m (46.70) held in a pouring rainstorm. After day one, Eaton's points total of 4728 was more than 300 points ahead of second-place competitor Trey Hardee. On the second day of competition, Eaton finished first in the 110-meter hurdles with a time of 13.70. In the discus, however, he had an eighth-place finish. He bounced back in the pole vault, posting a height of 5.30 m (17 ft 4 1/2 in), good enough for first place. In the javelin throw, Eaton had a distance of 58.87 m (193 ft 1 1/2 in) for fifth place. Going into the final event, the 1500 m run, Eaton held a 317-point lead over his closest competitor, Hardee. Eaton ran a new personal best in the 1500 m with a time of 4:14.48, finishing first. In the process, he brought his total score for the decathlon to 9039, breaking Roman Šebrle's previous world record of 9026 points. Eaton broke Dan O'Brien's American record of 8891 points set in 1992.

Olympics

At the 2012 Olympics, Eaton's primary rival was (now) teammate Trey Hardee. Eaton's 10.35 100 m was the top time of the day, with Hardee the next best. His 8.03 long jump was almost half a metre farther than any other competitor, building him a sizeable lead. His 14.66 shot put was just 12 cm short of his personal record, and his 2.05 high jump tied with several members of the field for second best. In the final first day event his 46.90 400 metres was over a full second faster than anybody else in the field. His first day total was 4661, with a 220-point lead over Hardee.

Day two started with a virtual tie between Hardee and Eaton, Eaton running a time of 13.56 in the 110m hurdles. Eaton's discus throw of 42.53 gave up almost 6 metres and 120 points to Hardee, but by that point, Eaton still had a 100-point lead. Eaton more than gained that back with a 5.20 pole vault, the third best competition. In the javelin throw Hardee pulled back 70 points with a good throw, but this advantage was limited by Eaton setting a new personal best of 61.96. With Eaton holding a 150+ point lead and a superior personal record in the 1500 m over Hardee, the medals were already determined. Nobody made a serious run at improving his position, and Eaton just went through the formality of completing the event in 4:33.59 to take the gold medal.

=== 2013 World Championships ===
Eaton won the 2013 world title in the decathlon with an 8809-point performance in Moscow.

=== 2014 World Indoor Championships ===
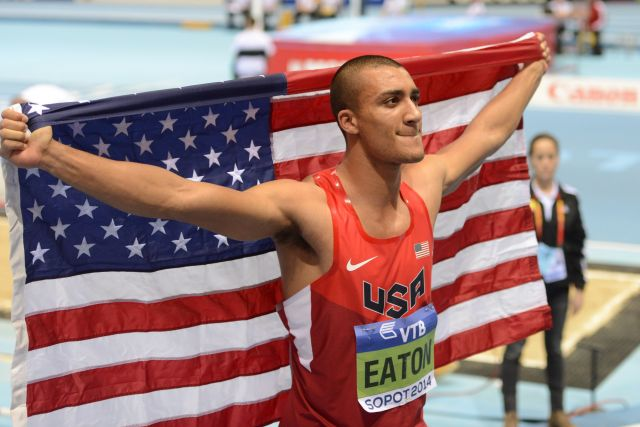
Eaton during the 2014 IAAF World Indoor Championships

In a February 2014 interview with Track & Field News (Vol. 67, no. 3), Eaton - and his coach Harry Marra - said 2014 would be a "rest" year, with no decathlon competitions. His only multi-event would be the heptathlon at World Indoors, which he entered having broken the world record in his last 3 consecutive indoor competitions. Eaton won the gold medal in the Heptathlon at the 2014 IAAF World Indoor Championships held in Sopot, Poland on 7 & 8 March 2014. As the defending champion he received an automatic entry and did not have to enter a qualifying meet. He opened the competition at the 15th world indoor championships at Ergo Arena with his fastest time ever for the 60 m, 6.66 seconds and never trailed. He followed that up with an excellent long jump, a good shot put and an excellent high jump (2.06m/6' 9") for a first day score of 3,653, which was just a single point less than when he set the Heptathlon record at the 2012 World Indoor meet. On Day 2, he opened with an outstanding time of 7.64 in the 60 m hurdles - a Championship meet record - and an excellent pole vault of 5.20m/17' 0-3/4". He won the 1,000 m by 3 seconds, however his time of 2:34.72 was 2 seconds slower than in 2012 and he fell 13 points short of his world record. His total of 6,632 points ranks as #2 all-time. Andrei Krauchanka of Belarus was 2nd with a new national record of 6,303 points, and Belgium's Thomas Van Der Plaetsen was 3rd with 6,259 (also a Belgian national record.)

Eaton told Track & Field News that during the 2014 outdoor season he planned to run some 400 m hurdles races for the first time in his career, as means of "doing something fun" while building his stamina for the 400 and 1,500 in future decathlon competitions. He also hoped to compete in some (world class) Diamond League meets in (variously) the 100 m, 110 m hurdles and/or the long jump. After resting from the grueling grind of decathlon training in 2014, Eaton would resume a program aimed at defending his titles at the 2015 Worlds in Beijing, China, the 2016 IAAF World Indoor Championships in Portland, Oregon, and the 2016 Summer Olympics in Rio de Janeiro, Brazil.

=== 2015 World Championships ===
Eaton won the 2015 world title in the decathlon improving his own world record with a 9045-point performance in Beijing.

| Decathlon | 9045 pts | Ashton Eaton (United States) | August 28–29, 2015 | 2015 World Championships in Athletics | Beijing National Stadium, Beijing, China |
| Decathlon | 100m (wind) / Long jump (wind) / Shot put / High jump / 400m / 110m H (wind) / Discus / Pole vault / Javelin / 1500m; 10.23 (-0.4 m/s) / 7.88 m (+0.0 m/s) / 14.52 m / 2.01 m / 45.00WDB / 13.69 (-0.2 m/s) / 43.34 m / 5.20 m / 63.63 m / 4:17.52 | | | | |

== Retirement ==
Eaton announced his retirement from the sport on January 3, 2017.

== Personal life ==
Eaton married his University of Oregon teammate, Canadian multi-event athlete Brianne Theisen, on July 15, 2013, one year after both competed in the London Olympics. The two first met in 2006 during Eaton's freshman year at Oregon and fell in love at the 2007 Pan American Junior Athletics Championships, held in Brazil: Theisen won the gold medal for Canada and then followed Eaton to enroll at the University of Oregon. Ashton and Brianne have two children.

== Honors and awards ==
- World Athletics Awards

World Athlete of the Year (Men)：2015

=== Major competition record ===
| Year | Competition | Venue | Position | Event | Result |
Representing the United States
| 2009 | World Championships | Berlin, Germany | 18th | Decathlon | 8061 |
| 2011 | World Championships | Daegu, South Korea | 2nd | Decathlon | 8505 |
| 2012 | World Indoor Championships | Istanbul, Turkey | 1st | Heptathlon | 6645 (WR) |
| 2012 | Olympic Games | London, United Kingdom | 1st | Decathlon | 8869 |
| 2013 | World Championships | Moscow, Russia | 1st | Decathlon | 8809 |
| 2014 | World Indoor Championships | Sopot, Poland | 1st | Heptathlon | 6632 |
| 2015 | World Championships | Beijing, China | 1st | Decathlon | 9045 (WR) |
| 2016 | World Indoor Championships | Portland, United States | 1st | Heptathlon | 6470 |
| 2016 | Olympic Games | Rio de Janeiro, Brazil | 1st | Decathlon | 8893 (OR) |

=== Personal bests ===
Outdoor

Individual events
| Event | Performance | Location | Date |
|---|---|---|---|
| Long jump | 8.06 m (26 ft 5 1/4 in) (−0.9 m/s) | Walnut | April 21, 2012 |
| Long jump | 8.09 m (26 ft 6 1/2 in) (+2.2 m/s) | Walnut | April 16, 2016 |
| High jump | 2.11 m (6 ft 11 in) | Burnaby | June 10, 2012 |
| Pole vault | 5.40 m (17 ft 8 1/2 in) | Portland | August 8, 2015 |
| 100 meters | 10.33 (−1.0 m/s) | Berkeley | May 16, 2010 |
| 100 meters | 10.19 (+2.7 m/s) | Berkeley | May 15, 2010 |
| 200 meters | 20.76 (+1.8 m/s) | Walnut | April 19, 2013 |
| 400 meters | 45.55 | Atlanta | August 1, 2015 |
| 110 meters hurdles | 13.35 (+1.8 m/s) | Eugene | June 4, 2011 |
| 110 meters hurdles | 13.34 (+2.4 m/s) | Eugene | June 2, 2012 |
| 400 meters hurdles | 48.69 | Glasgow | July 11, 2014 |
| Shot put | 15.40 m (50 ft 6 1/4 in) | Palo Alto | March 30, 2013 |
| Discus throw | 46.53 m (152 ft 7 3/4 in) | Mörfelden | July 13, 2012 |
| Javelin throw | 66.64 m (218 ft 7 1/2 in) | San Luis Obispo | March 16, 2013 |

Combined events
| Event | Performance | Location | Date | Score |
|---|---|---|---|---|
| Decathlon | —N/a | Beijing | August 28–29, 2015 | 9,045 points |
| 100 meters | 10.21 (+0.4 m/s) | Eugene | June 22, 2012 | 1,044 points |
| Long jump | 8.23 m (27 ft 0 in) (+0.8 m/s) | Eugene | June 22, 2012 | 1,120 points |
| Shot put | 15.40 m (50 ft 6 1/4 in) | Palo Alto | March 30, 2013 | 814 points |
| High jump | 2.11 m (6 ft 11 in) | Vancouver | June 10, 2012 | 906 points |
| 400 meters | 45.00^{[a]} | Beijing | August 28, 2015 | 1,060 points |
| 110 meters hurdles | 13.35 (+1.8 m/s) | Eugene | June 4, 2011 | 1,060 points |
| Discus throw | 47.36 m (155 ft 4 1/2 in) | Chula Vista | August 14, 2011 | 816 points |
| Pole vault | 5.40 m (17 ft 8 1/2 in) | Portland | August 8, 2015 | 1,035 points |
| Javelin throw | 64.83 m (212 ft 8 1/4 in) | Moscow | August 11, 2013 | 811 points |
| 1500 meters | 4:14.48 | Eugene | June 23, 2012 | 850 points |
| Virtual Best Performance | | | | 9,516 points |

^{a} Decathlon best

Indoor

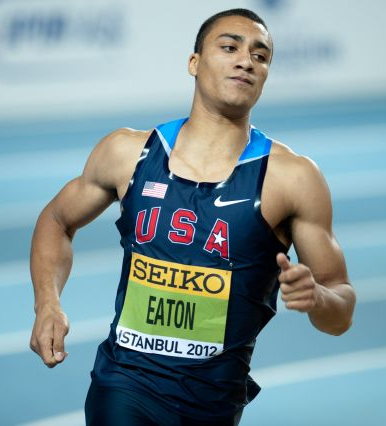
Eaton en route to victory at the 2012 Indoor World Championships

Individual events
| Event | Performance | Location | Date |
|---|---|---|---|
| Long jump | 8.06 m (26 ft 5 1/4 in) | Albuquerque | February 26, 2012 |
| High jump | 2.06 m (6 ft 9 in) | Seattle | January 16, 2010 |
| Pole vault | 5.40 m (17 ft 8 1/2 in) | Boston | February 14, 2016 |
| 60 meters | 6.69 | Athlone | February 26, 2014 |
| 300 meters | 33.93 | Seattle | January 19, 2008 |
| 400 meters | 47.97 | College Station | January 28, 2012 |
| 800 meters | 1:55.90 | Princeton | January 22, 2011 |
| 60 meters hurdles | 7.51 | New York City | February 14, 2015 |
| Shot put | 15.05 m (49 ft 4 1/2 in) | Boston | February 8, 2014 |

Combined events
| Event | Performance | Location | Date | Score |
|---|---|---|---|---|
| Heptathlon | —N/a | Istanbul | March 9–10, 2012 | 6,645 points |
| 60 meters | 6.66 | Tallinn | February 5, 2011 | 1,007 points |
| Long jump | 8.16 m (26 ft 9 1/4 in) | Istanbul | March 9, 2012 | 1,102 points |
| Shot put | 14.88 m (48 ft 9 3/4 in) | Sopot | March 7, 2014 | 782 points |
| High jump | 2.11 m (6 ft 11 in) | Fayetteville | February 5, 2010 | 906 points |
| 60 meters hurdles | 7.60 | Tallinn | February 6, 2011 | 1,109 points |
| Pole vault | 5.20 m (17 ft 1/2 in) | Tallinn | February 6, 2011 | 1,035 points |
| 1000 meters | 2:32.67 | Fayetteville | March 13, 2010 | 957 points |
| Virtual Best Performance | | | | 6,811 points |

=== World records ===
| No. | Event | Points | Meet | Location | Date | Age |
|---|---|---|---|---|---|---|
| 1 | Heptathlon | 6499 | 2010 NCAA Indoor Championships | Fayetteville | March 13, 2010 | 22 |
| 2 | Heptathlon | 6568 | Tallinn International Indoor Combined Events Meeting | Tallinn | February 6, 2011 | 23 |
| 3 | Heptathlon | 6645 | 2012 IAAF World Indoor Championships | Istanbul | March 10, 2012 | 24 |
| 4 | Decathlon | 9039 | 2012 United States Olympic Trials | Eugene | June 23, 2012 | 24 |
| 5 | Decathlon | 9045 | 2015 World Championships | Beijing | August 29, 2015 | 27 |

== See also ==
- Decathlon world record progression
- Men's heptathlon world record progression

Records
| Preceded by Dan O'Brien | Men's heptathlon world record holder March 13, 2010 – March 21, 2026 | Succeeded by Simon Ehammer |
| Preceded by Roman Šebrle | Men's decathlon world record holder June 23, 2012 – September 16, 2018 | Succeeded by Kevin Mayer |
Awards
| Preceded by Galen Rupp | The Bowerman (men's winner); 2010 | Succeeded by Ngoni Makusha |
| Preceded by Jesse Williams | Men's Jesse Owens Award; 2012 | Succeeded by LaShawn Merritt |
| Preceded by Renaud Lavillenie | IAAF World Athlete of the Year; 2015 | Succeeded by Usain Bolt |
| Preceded by Renaud Lavillenie | Men's Track & Field Athlete of the Year; 2015 | Succeeded by Wayde van Niekerk |
