= 2016 IAAF World Indoor Championships – Men's heptathlon =

Men's heptathlon at the 2016 IAAF World Indoor Championships
- Venue: Oregon Convention Center
- Dates: March 18–19
- Competitors: 11 from 9 nations
- Winning points: 6470

Medalists
gold medal	Ashton Eaton	United States
silver medal	Oleksiy Kasyanov	Ukraine
bronze medal	Mathias Brugger	Germany

The men's heptathlon at the 2016 IAAF World Indoor Championships took place on March 18 and 19, 2016.

== Results ==
=== 60 metres ===
The 60 metres was started on March 18 at 11:30.

Rank	Heat	Name	Nationality	Result	Points	Notes
1	2	Ashton Eaton	United States	6.81	951	
2	2	Oleksiy Kasyanov	Ukraine	6.86	933	SB
3	2	Samuel Remédios	Portugal	6.93	907	
4	1	Kurt Felix	Grenada	7.00	882	PB
5	2	Jérémy Lelièvre	France	7.02	875	
6	2	Curtis Beach	United States	7.04	868	
7	1	Adam Sebastian Helcelet	Czech Republic	7.05	865	SB
8	2	Jorge Ureña	Spain	7.10	847	
9	2	Mathias Brugger	Germany	7.15	830	
10	1	Petter Olson	Sweden	7.17	823	
11	1	Tim Nowak	Germany	7.18	819	SB

=== Long jump ===
The long jump was started on March 18 at 12:20.

Rank	Name	Nationality	#1	#2	#3	Result	Points	Notes	Total
1	Ashton Eaton	United States	7.85	8.08	–	8.08	1081	SB	2032
2	Curtis Beach	United States	7.37	7.54	7.65	7.65	972	SB	1840
3	Oleksiy Kasyanov	Ukraine	7.03	7.49	7.45	7.49	932		1865
4	Kurt Felix	Grenada	7.22	7.29	7.45	7.45	922		1804
5	Mathias Brugger	Germany	7.30	7.15	7.26	7.30	886	SB	1716
6	Adam Sebastian Helcelet	Czech Republic	7.09	7.19	7.06	7.19	859		1724
7	Samuel Remédios	Portugal	x	x	7.16	7.16	852		1759
8	Jorge Ureña	Spain	x	6.92	7.15	7.15	850		1697
9	Jérémy Lelièvre	France	7.11	7.14	6.91	7.14	847		1722
10	Petter Olson	Sweden	6.89	6.76	6.99	6.99	811	SB	1634
11	Tim Nowak	Germany	6.69	6.79	6.92	6.92	795		1614

=== Shot put ===
The shot put was started on March 18 at 17:15.

Rank	Name	Nationality	#1	#2	#3	Result	Points	Notes	Total
1	Kurt Felix	Grenada	14.65	14.80	15.02	15.02	791	SB	2595
2	Adam Sebastian Helcelet	Czech Republic	14.74	14.56	14.96	14.96	787	SB	2511
3	Oleksiy Kasyanov	Ukraine	14.41	x	14.53	14.53	761		2626
4	Mathias Brugger	Germany	14.17	14.47	14.03	14.47	757		2473
5	Tim Nowak	Germany	14.16	13.77	14.31	14.31	747	PB	2361
6	Ashton Eaton	United States	x	13.39	14.16	14.16	738	SB	2770
7	Jérémy Lelièvre	France	14.04	13.74	x	14.04	738	SB	2453
8	Petter Olson	Sweden	13.46	x	13.92	13.92	723	SB	2357
9	Samuel Remédios	Portugal	12.30	13.04	13.48	13.48	697	PB	2456
10	Curtis Beach	United States	13.03	12.87	13.12	13.12	675	PB	2515
11	Jorge Ureña	Spain	12.24	x	11.89	12.24	621	PB	2318

=== High jump ===
The high jump was started on March 18 at 18:45.

Rank	Name	Nationality	1.87	1.90	1.93	1.96	1.99	2.02	2.05	2.08	2.11	2.14	Result	Points	Notes	Total
1	Kurt Felix	Grenada	–	–	–	–	o	o	xxo	xxo	xxo	xxx	2.11	906	SB	3501
2	Mathias Brugger	Germany	–	–	o	–	xxo	o	xxo	xxx			2.05	850		3323
3	Adam Helcelet	Czech Republic	–	o	o	o	o	o	xxx				2.02	822		3333
4	Curtis Beach	United States	o	o	o	o	o	xo	xxx				2.02	822	SB	3337
5	Ashton Eaton	United States	–	–	o	–	o	xxx					1.99	794	SB	3564
6	Tim Nowak	Germany	–	–	xo	–	o	xxx					1.99	794	SB	3155
7	Oleksiy Kasyanov	Ukraine	–	o	o	o	xo	xxx					1.99	794	SB	3420
8	Jorge Ureña	Spain	o	–	xo	o	xxx						1.96	767		3085
9	Petter Olson	Sweden	o	o	xo	xxx							1.93	740		3097
10	Samuel Remédios	Portugal	xxo	xxo	xo	xxx							1.93	740		3196
11	Jérémy Lelièvre	France	xxo	xxx									1.87	687		3140

=== 60 metres hurdles ===
The 60 metres hurdles was started on March 19 at 11:00.

Rank	Heat	Name	Nationality	Result	Points	Notes	Total
1	2	Ashton Eaton	United States	7.78	1038		4602
2	2	Oleksiy Kasyanov	Ukraine	7.91	1005		4425
3	2	Adam Sebastian Helcelet	Czech Republic	8.04	972	SB	4305
4	2	Samuel Remédios	Portugal	8.13	949		4145
5	1	Tim Nowak	Germany	8.21	930	PB	4085
6	2	Jorge Ureña	Spain	8.23	925		4010
7	1	Mathias Brugger	Germany	8.24	922	SB	4245
8	1	Jérémy Lelièvre	France	8.24	922		4062
9	1	Petter Olson	Sweden	8.25	920		4017
10	1	Kurt Felix	Grenada	8.34	898		4399
11	2	Curtis Beach	United States	8.45	872		4209

=== Pole vault ===
The pole vault was started on March 19 at 12:00.

Rank	Name	Nationality	4.30	4.40	4.50	4.60	4.70	4.80	4.90	5.00	5.10	5.20	5.50	Result	Points	Notes	Total
1	Mathias Brugger	Germany	–	–	–	–	–	o	–	o	xo	xxx		5.10	941	PB	5186
2	Ashton Eaton	United States	–	–	–	–	–	–	o	–	xo	–	xx–	5.10	941		5543
3	Curtis Beach	United States	–	–	–	o	o	o	o	xxo	xxx			5.00	910		5119
4	Adam Helcelet	Czech Republic	–	–	o	–	o	o	xo	xxx				4.90	880	SB	5185
5	Tim Nowak	Germany	–	–	xo	–	o	xo	xo	xxx				4.90	880	PB	4965
6	Oleksiy Kasyanov	Ukraine	–	–	o	–	o	xo	xxo	xxx				4.90	880	PB	5305
7	Petter Olson	Sweden	–	–	–	o	o	o	xxx					4.80	849		4866
8	Jérémy Lelièvre	France	o	–	xo	o	xxx							4.60	790		4852
9	Samuel Remédios	Portugal	–	o	–	xxo	–	xxx						4.60	790		4935
10	Kurt Felix	Grenada	–	xxo	o	xxx								4.50	760		5159
	Jorge Ureña	Spain												DNS	0		DNF

=== 1000 metres ===
Video on YouTube Official Video

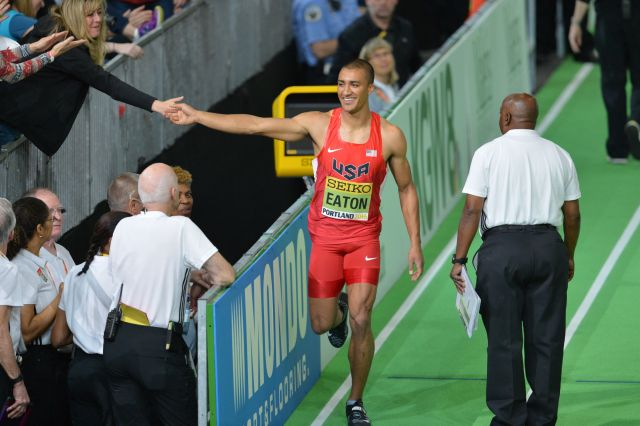
Ashton Eaton after the last event

The 1000 metres was started on March 19 at 19:35.

Rank	Name	Nationality	Result	Points	Notes
1	Curtis Beach	United States	2:29.04	999	CB
2	Mathias Brugger	Germany	2:34.10	940	PB
3	Ashton Eaton	United States	2:35.22	927	SB
4	Jérémy Lelièvre	France	2:36.15	917	SB
5	Oleksiy Kasyanov	Ukraine	2:39.64	877	SB
6	Tim Nowak	Germany	2:40.57	867	PB
7	Petter Olson	Sweden	2:43.85	831	
8	Kurt Felix	Grenada	2:44.23	827	SB
9	Adam Sebastian Helcelet	Czech Republic	2:45.06	818	SB
10	Samuel Remédios	Portugal	2:46.92	798	

=== Final standing ===
After all events.

The highest mark recorded in each event is highlighted in yellow

Rank	Athlete	Nationality	60m	LJ	SP	HJ	60m H	PV	1000m	Points	Notes
1st place, gold medalist(s)	Ashton Eaton	United States	6.81	8.08	14.16	1.99	7.78	5.10	2:35.22	6470	WL
2nd place, silver medalist(s)	Oleksiy Kasyanov	Ukraine	6.86	7.49	14.53	1.99	7.91	4.90	2:39.64	6182	SB
3rd place, bronze medalist(s)	Mathias Brugger	Germany	7.15	7.30	14.47	2.05	8.24	5.10	2:34.10	6126	PB
4	Curtis Beach	United States	7.04	7.65	13.12	2.02	8.45	5.00	2:29.04	6118	SB
5	Adam Sebastian Helcelet	Czech Republic	7.05	7.19	14.96	2.02	8.04	4.90	2:45.06	6003	SB
6	Kurt Felix	Grenada	7.00	7.45	15.02	2.11	8.34	4.50	2:44.23	5986	NR
7	Tim Nowak	Germany	7.18	6.92	14.31	1.99	8.21	4.90	2:40.57	5832	PB
8	Jérémy Lelièvre	France	7.02	7.14	14.04	1.87	8.24	4.60	2:36.15	5769	
9	Samuel Remédios	Portugal	6.93	7.16	13.48	1.93	8.13	4.60	2:46.92	5733	
10	Petter Olson	Sweden	7.17	6.99	13.92	1.93	8.25	4.80	2:43.85	5697	
	Jorge Ureña	Spain	7.10	7.15	12.24	1.96	8.23	DNS	–	DNF	
