= Curtis Beach =

American decathlete (born 1990)

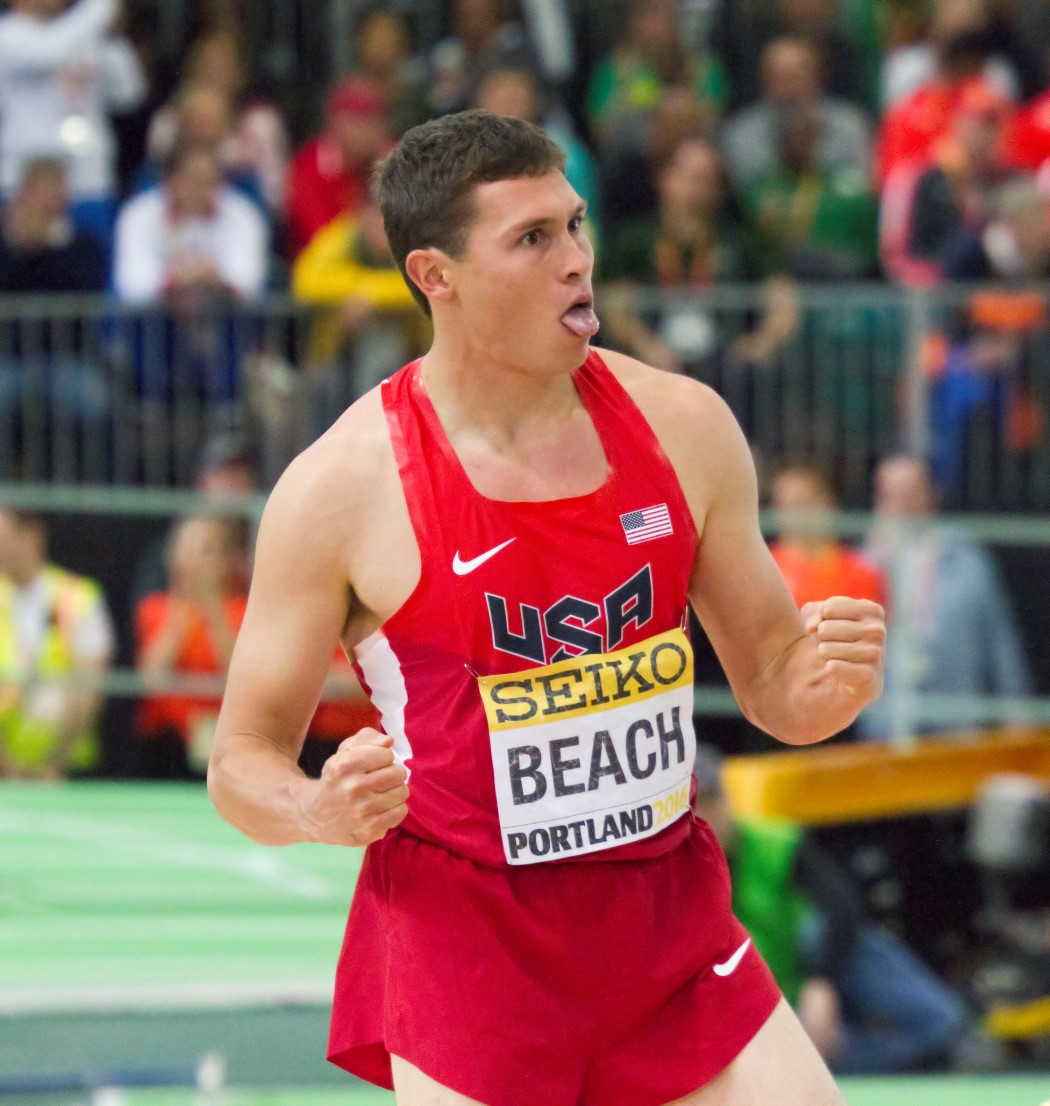
- Beach in 2016

Personal information
- Full name: Curtis Lee Beach
- Nationality: United States
- Born: July 22, 1990 (age 36) Albuquerque, New Mexico
- Height: 6 ft 0 in (183 cm)
- Weight: 166 lb (75 kg)

Sport
- Sport: Athletics
- Event: Combined events
- College team: Duke Blue Devils (2009–14)
- Retired: 2021
- Now coaching: PLNU Sea Lions (2025–)

Achievements and titles
- Personal bests: Decathlon: 8,084 points (2011); Heptathlon: 6,190 points (2014)
Medal record
Representing the United States
Pan American Junior Championships
Gold medal – first place	2009 Port-of-Spain	Decathlon
USATF Indoor Championships
Gold medal – first place	2016 Portland	Heptathlon

Curtis Lee Beach (born July 22, 1990) is a retired American decathlete and a two-time NCAA heptathlon champion who holds the world heptathlon best in the 1000 meters.

== Early life ==
Beach was born in Albuquerque, New Mexico, the oldest son of Jeana King-Beach and David Beach.

From a young age, he showed athletic promise, joining a track club at eight and competing in his first decathlon at fourteen. At Albuquerque Academy, he won 17 individual New Mexico state titles and set national high school records in the pentathlon and decathlon (with both high school and international implements). In 2009, DyeStat declared him "the greatest US high school decathlete ever."

== College ==
Beach attended Duke University, where he became a two-time NCAA national champion in the heptathlon, winning in 2012 and 2014. In 2011, he set a collegiate record in the decathlon 1500 meters and finished second in the decathlon at the NCAA Championships. In 2010 and 2012, he set world heptathlon bests in the 1000 meters.

== Professional career ==
After graduating from Duke, Beach underwent Tommy John surgery, then for the next three years competed professionally for Nike. In 2016, he won the heptathlon at the U.S. indoor national championships and placed fourth in the heptathlon at the World Indoor Championships. In 2017, he explored other events, including a focus on the 800 meters and the 400 meters hurdles.

== Honors and awards ==
Governor Bill Richardson declared July 1, 2009, to be "Curtis Lee Beach Day" in recognition of the day that Beach was named the 2009 Gatorade National Boys Track & Field Athlete of the Year. He received the Fair Play award for cheering on Ashton Eaton during the final leg of the decathlon 1500 meters at the 2012 US Olympic Trials. In 2015, he was inducted into the New Mexico Sports Hall of Fame.

== Personal bests ==
Outdoor

Individual events
Event	Performance	Location	Date
Long jump	7.88 m (25 ft 10 in) (+0.0 m/s)	New York City	June 14, 2013
200 meters	21.57 (+1.8 m/s)	Claremont	June 3, 2017
800 meters	1:47.36	New York City	July 6, 2017
400m hurdles	49.83	Claremont	June 3, 2017

Combined events
Event	Performance	Location	Date	Score	Ref.
Decathlon	—N/a	Des Moines	June 9–10, 2011	8,084 points	—N/a
100 meters	10.52 (+1.9 m/s)	Chula Vista	May 22, 2015	970 points	
Long jump	7.85 m (25 ft 9 in) (+1.3 m/s)	Chula Vista	May 22, 2015	1,022 points	
Shot put	12.64 m (41 ft 5 1/2 in)	Chula Vista	May 22, 2015	645 points	
High jump	2.05 m (6 ft 8 1/2 in)	Eugene	June 25, 2009	850 points	
400 meters	46.72	Raleigh	April 19, 2013	972 points	
110m hurdles	14.23 (+1.0 m/s)	Azusa	April 14, 2016	945 points	
Discus throw	39.44 m (129 ft 4 3/4 in)	Eugene	June 23, 2012	653 points	
Pole vault	5.10 m (16 ft 8 3/4 in)	Austin	March 28, 2013	941 points	
Javelin throw	48.42 m (158 ft 10 1/4 in)	Des Moines	June 10, 2011	565 points	
1500 meters	3:59.13	Des Moines	June 10, 2011	960 points	
Virtual Best Performance				8,523 points	—N/a

Indoor

Individual events
Event	Performance	Location	Date	Ref.
500 meters	1:01.50	New York City	February 7, 2014	
600 meters	1:16.38	Albuquerque	March 4, 2017	
800 meters	1:52.72	New York City	March 15, 2009	

Combined events
Event	Performance	Location	Date	Score	Ref.
Heptathlon	—N/a	Albuquerque	March 14–15, 2014	6,190 points	—N/a
60 meters	7.01	Crete, Nebraska	February 26, 2016	879 points	
Long jump	7.67 m (25 ft 1 3/4 in)	Albuquerque	March 14, 2014	977 points	
Shot put	13.12 m (43 ft 1/2 in)	Portland	March 18, 2016	675 points	
High jump	2.11 m (6 ft 11 in)	Albuquerque	March 1, 2013	906 points	
60m hurdles	8.07	Crete, Nebraska	February 27, 2016	964 points	
Pole vault	5.10 m (16 ft 8 3/4 in)	Crete, Nebraska	February 27, 2016	941 points	
1000 meters	2:23.63^{[a]}	Nampa	March 10, 2012	1,064 points	
Virtual Best Performance				6,406 points	—N/a

^{a} Heptathlon best
