= Ilya Shkurenyov =

Russian decathlete

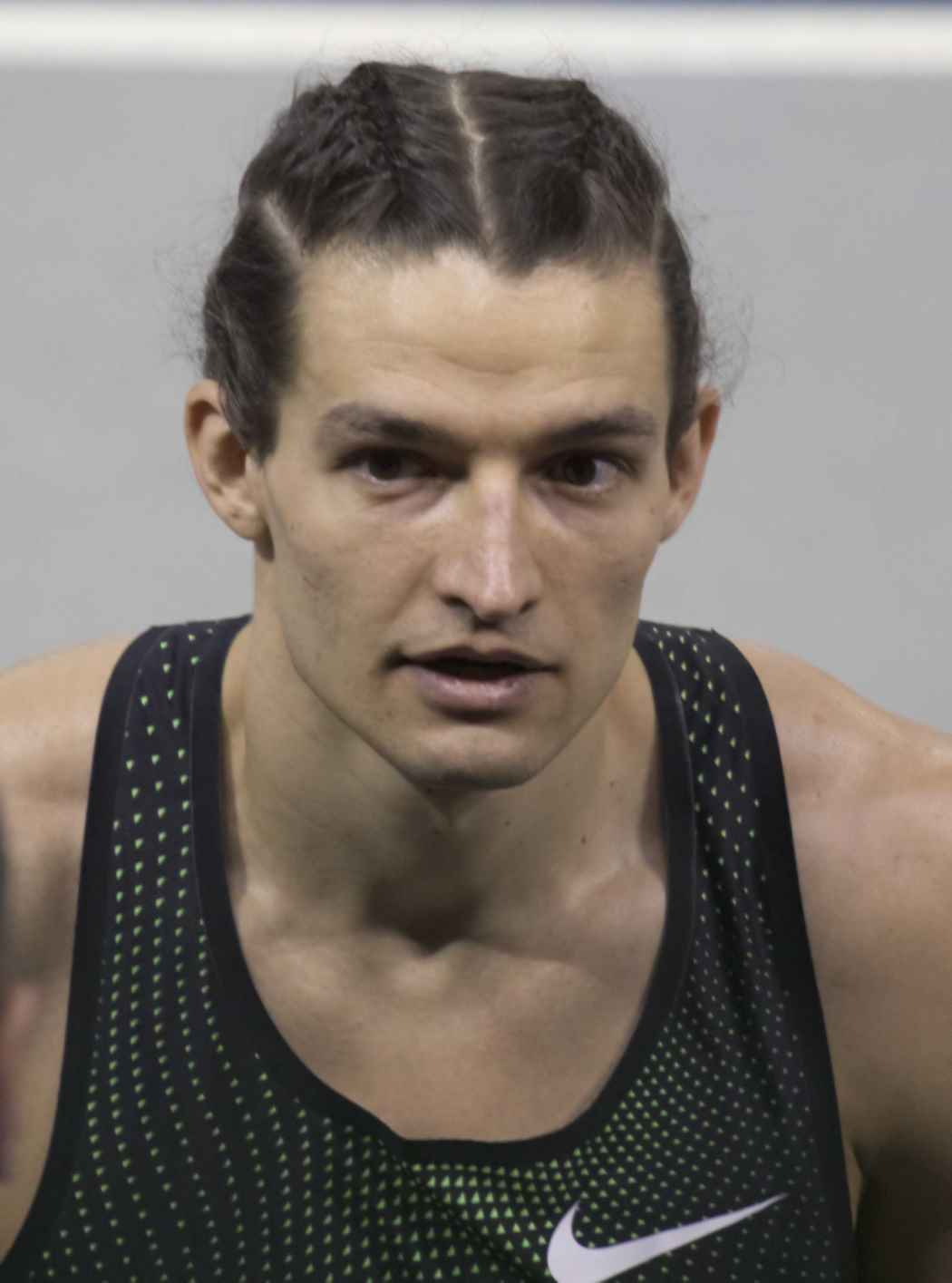
- Ilya Shkurenyov in 2019

Personal information
- Full name: Ilya Yuryevich Shkurenyov
- National team: Russia
- Born: 11 January 1991 (age 35) Linyovo, Volgograd Oblast, RSFSR, USSR (now Russia)
- Height: 1.91 m (6 ft 3 in)
- Weight: 82 kg (181 lb) (2015)

Sport
- Country: Russia / ANA (2017–19); ROC (2021)
- Sport: Men's athletics
- Event: Decathlon

Achievements and titles
- Personal best(s): Decathlon: 8,601 (2017); Hepthalon: 6,353 (2015)
Medal record
Representing Russia
European Championships
Bronze medal – third place	2012 Helsinki	Decathlon
Bronze medal – third place	2014 Zürich	Decathlon
European Indoor Championships
Gold medal – first place	2015 Prague	Heptathlon
Representing Authorised Neutral Athletes
European Championships
Silver medal – second place	2018 Berlin	Decathlon
European Indoor Championships
Bronze medal – third place	2019 Glasgow	Heptathlon

Ilya Yuryevich Shkurenyov (Russian: Илья Юрьевич Шкуренёв; born 11 January 1991) is a Russian decathlete. His personal best score is 8538 points, achieved at the 2015 IAAF World Championships in Beijing. He was second at IAAF World Junior Championships in 2010, 4th at IAAF World Indoor Championships 2012 in heptathlon.

== Personal bests ==
=== Outdoor ===
Information from World Athletics profile unless otherwise noted.

As of 14 July 2025

Event	Performance	Location	Date
110m hurdles	14.67 (-0.3 m/s)	Moscow	18 July 2016
Long jump	7.64 m (25 ft 3/4 in) (+1.9 m/s)	Chelyabinsk	9 September 2020
Long jump	7.81 m (25 ft 7 1/4 in) (+2.6 m/s)	Chelyabinsk	9 September 2020
Shot put	14.09 m (46 ft 2 1/2 in)	Sochi	15 May 2018
Discus throw	43.25 m (141 ft 10 3/4 in)	Sochi	20 September 2020
Javelin throw	57.08 m (187 ft 3 in)	Sochi	15 May 2018

Event	Performance	Location	Date	Score
Decathlon	—N/a	Smolensk	9–10 June 2017	8,601 points
100 metres	10.85 (+0.6 m/s)	Chelyabinsk	25 August 2022	894 points
Long jump	7.78 m (25 ft 6 1/4 in) (+0.0 m/s)	Cheboksary	20 June 2016	1,005 points
Shot put	14.95 m (49 ft 1/2 in)	Tokyo	4 August 2021	787 points
High jump	2.12 m (6 ft 11 1/4 in)	Smolensk	9 June 2017	915 points
400 metres	47.88	Beijing	28 August 2015	915 points
110m hurdles	13.95 (+1.4 m/s)	Smolensk	10 June 2017	981 points
Discus throw	48.75 m (159 ft 11 1/4 in)	Doha	3 October 2019	844 points
Pole vault	5.40 m (17 ft 8 1/2 in)	Moscow	11 August 2013	1,035 points
Javelin throw	63.58 m (208 ft 7 in)	Zürich	13 August 2014	792 points
1500 metres	4:24.98	Beijing	29 August 2015	778 points
Virtual Best Performance				8,946 points

=== Indoor ===
As of 14 July 2025

Event	Performance	Location	Date
60 metres	7.22	Volgograd	18 January 2017
60 metres hurdles	8.00	Krasnodar	14 January 2022
Long jump	7.33 m (24 ft 1/2 in)	Moscow	7 February 2021
High jump	1.96 m (6 ft 5 in)	Volgograd	18 January 2017
Pole vault	5.25 m (17 ft 2 1/2 in)	Moscow	14 February 2019
Shot put	14.49 m (47 ft 6 1/4 in)	Moscow	18 December 2015

Event	Performance	Location	Date	Score
Heptathlon	—N/a	Prague	7–8 March 2015	6,353 points
60 metres	6.98	Prague	7 March 2015	889 points
Long jump	7.78 m (25 ft 6 1/4 in)	Prague	7 March 2015	1,005 points
Shot put	14.40 m (47 ft 2 3/4 in)	Krasnodar	18 January 2014	753 points
High jump	2.11 m (6 ft 11 in)	Moscow	17 January 2015	906 points
60 metres hurdles	7.86	Prague	8 March 2015	1,017 points
Pole vault	5.40 m (17 ft 8 1/2 in)	Smolensk	19 February 2021	1,035 points
1000 meters	2:41.65	Volgograd	8 February 2013	855 points
Virtual Best Performance				6,460 points

== Competition record ==
Year	Competition	Venue	Position	Event	Notes
Representing Russia
2010	World Junior Championships	Moncton	2nd	Decathlon (junior)	7830 pts (PB)
2011	European U23 Championships	Ostrava	5th	Decathlon	7894 (PB)
2012	European Championships	Helsinki	3rd	Decathlon	8219 (PB)
2012	Summer Olympics	London	16th	Decathlon	7948
2013	European Indoor Championships	Gothenburg	5th	Heptathlon	6018 (PB)
2013	European U23 Championships	Tampere	2nd	Decathlon	8279 (SB)
2013	World Championships	Moscow	8th	Decathlon	8370 (PB)
2014	European Championships	Zürich	3rd	Decathlon	8498 (PB)
2015	European Indoor Championships	Prague	1st	Heptathlon	6353 (PB)
2015	World Championships	Beijing	4th	Decathlon	8538 pts (PB)
Representing Authorised Neutral Athletes
2017	World Championships	London	–	Decathlon	DNF
2018	European Championships	Berlin	2nd	Decathlon	8321 (SB)
2019	European Indoor Championships	Glasgow	3rd	Heptathlon	6145 pts
2019	World Championships	Doha	4th	Decathlon	8494 pts
2021	Olympic Games	Tokyo	8th	Decathlon	8413 pts
