= Estonia at the 2025 World Athletics Championships =

- Flag of Estonia
- WA code: EST

in Tokyo, Japan 13 September 2025 – 21 September 2025
- Competitors: 10 (5 men and 5 women)
- Medals: Gold 0 Silver 0 Bronze 0 Total 0

World Athletics Championships appearances (overview)
- 1993; 1995; 1997; 1999; 2001; 2003; 2005; 2007; 2009; 2011; 2013; 2015; 2017; 2019; 2022; 2023; 2025

Estonia competed at the 2025 World Athletics Championships in Tokyo, Japan, from 13 to 21 September 2025.

== Results ==
Estonia entered 10 athletes to the championships: 5 women and 5 men.

Key

- Q = Qualified for the next round
- q = Qualified for the next round as a fastest loser or, in field events, by position without achieving the qualifying target
- NR = National record
- PB = Personal best
- SB = Season best
- N/A = Round not applicable for the event

=== Men ===
Track and road events

Athlete	Event	Heat		Semifinal		Final	
Athlete	Event	Result	Rank	Result	Rank	Result	Rank
Leonid Latsepov	Marathon	—N/a				2:29:59	64
Tiidrek Nurme	Marathon	—N/a				2:21:58	51

Combined events – Decathlon

Athlete	Event	100 m	LJ	SP	HJ	400 m	110H	DT	PV	JT	1500 m	Final	Rank
Johannes Erm	Result	10.78	7.63	15.18	1.96	47.51	14.52	45.21	5.10	56.32	4:29.15	8431 SB	5
Johannes Erm	Points	910	967	801	767	933	908	771	941	683	750	8431 SB	5
Janek Õiglane	Result	11.16	6.61	13.71	DNS	—N/a						DNF	
Janek Õiglane	Points	825	723	711	DNS	—N/a						DNF	
Karel Tilga	Result	11.02	7.31	15.78	NM	48.64	14.99	50.61	NM	69.33	DNF	6073	16
Karel Tilga	Points	856	888	838	0	878	851	883	0	879	0	6073	16

=== Women ===
Track and road events

Athlete	Event	Heat		Semifinal		Final	
Athlete	Event	Result	Rank	Result	Rank	Result	Rank
Ann Marii Kivikas	200 metres	23.14	7	Did not advance			
Jekaterina Mirotvortseva	20 kilometres walk	—N/a				1:36:25	38

Field events

Athlete	Event	Qualification		Final	
Athlete	Event	Distance	Position	Distance	Position
Elisabeth Pihela	High jump	1.88	12 q	NM	
Marleen Mülla	Pole vault	4.25	24	Did not advance	

Combined events – Heptathlon

Athlete	Event	100H	HJ	SP	200 m	LJ	JT	800 m	Final	Rank
Pippi Lotta Enok	Result	13.86	NM	NM	24.71	5.84 m	41.70 m	2:18.35	4259	19
Pippi Lotta Enok	Points	998	0	0	914	801	700	846	4259	19
