= Estonia at the World Athletics Championships =

- Flag of Estonia
- WA code: EST
- National federation: Estonian Athletic Association
- Website: www.ekjl.ee (in Estonian)
- Medals Ranked 54th: Gold 2 Silver 6 Bronze 2 Total 10

World Athletics Championships appearances (overview)
- 1993; 1995; 1997; 1999; 2001; 2003; 2005; 2007; 2009; 2011; 2013; 2015; 2017; 2019; 2022; 2023; 2025

Estonia has participated at the World Athletics Championships since 1993, winning 2 world titles, 6 silver medals and 2 bronze medals.

== Summary ==
| Championships | Athletes | Gold | Silver | Bronze | Total | Rank |
| 1993 Stuttgart | 4 | 0 | 0 | 0 | 0 | – |
| 1995 Gothenburg | 10 | 0 | 0 | 0 | 0 | – |
| 1997 Athens | 5 | 0 | 0 | 0 | 0 | – |
| 1999 Seville | 7 | 0 | 0 | 0 | 0 | – |
| 2001 Edmonton | 2 | 0 | 1 | 0 | 1 | 30th |
| 2003 Paris | 7 | 0 | 1 | 0 | 1 | 31st |
| 2005 Helsinki | 9 | 1 | 1 | 0 | 2 | 13th |
| 2007 Osaka | 9 | 1 | 0 | 0 | 1 | 14th |
| 2009 Berlin | 19 | 0 | 0 | 1 | 1 | 36th |
| 2011 Daegu | 9 | 0 | 1 | 0 | 1 | 24th |
| 2013 Moscow | 9 | 0 | 0 | 1 | 1 | 33rd |
| 2015 Beijing | 15 | 0 | 0 | 0 | 0 | – |
| 2017 London | 14 | 0 | 0 | 0 | 0 | – |
| 2019 Doha | 9 | 0 | 2 | 0 | 2 | 21st |
| 2022 Eugene | 5 | 0 | 0 | 0 | 0 | – |
| 2023 Budapest | 7 | 0 | 0 | 0 | 0 | – |
| 2025 Tokyo | 10 | 0 | 0 | 0 | 0 | – |
| Total | | 2 | 6 | 2 | 10 | 54th |

== Medalists ==
| Name | Championships | Event | Medal |
|---|---|---|---|
| Gerd Kanter | 2007 Osaka | Men's discus throw | Gold |
| Gerd Kanter | 2005 Helsinki | Men's discus throw | Silver |
| Gerd Kanter | 2011 Daegu | Men's discus throw | Silver |
| Gerd Kanter | 2009 Berlin | Men's discus throw | Bronze |
| Gerd Kanter | 2013 Moscow | Men's discus throw | Bronze |
| Andrus Värnik | 2005 Helsinki | Men's javelin throw | Gold |
| Andrus Värnik | 2003 Paris | Men's javelin throw | Silver |
| Erki Nool | 2001 Edmonton | Men's decathlon | Silver |
| Maicel Uibo | 2019 Doha | Men's decathlon | Silver |
| Magnus Kirt | 2019 Doha | Men's javelin throw | Silver |

== See also ==
- Estonia at the IAAF World Indoor Championships
- Estonia at the European Athletics Championships
