= Estonia at the 2019 World Athletics Championships =

Estonia at the 2019 World Championships in Athletics
- Flag of Estonia
- WA code: EST
- National federation: Estonian Athletic Association
- Website: ekjl.ee

in Doha, Qatar 27 September 2019 – 6 October 2019
- Competitors: 9 (9 men and 0 women) in 7 events
- Medals Ranked 21st: Gold 0 Silver 2 Bronze 0 Total 2

World Championships in Athletics appearances (overview)
- 1993; 1995; 1997; 1999; 2001; 2003; 2005; 2007; 2009; 2011; 2013; 2015; 2017; 2019; 2022; 2023; 2025

Estonia competed at the 2019 World Athletics Championships in Doha, Qatar, from 27 September to 6 October 2019.

== Medalists ==
Medal	Athlete	Event	Date
Silver	Maicel Uibo	Decathlon	3 October
Silver	Magnus Kirt	Javelin throw	6 October

== Results ==
=== Men ===
Track and road events

Athlete	Event	Heat		Semifinal		Final	
Athlete	Event	Result	Rank	Result	Rank	Result	Rank
Roman Fosti	Marathon	—N/a				2:18:30 SB	33
Tiidrek Nurme	Marathon	—N/a				2:17:38	26
Rasmus Mägi	400 metres hurdles	49.34 SB	4 Q	48.93 SB	9	Did not advance	
Kaur Kivistik	3000 metres steeplechase	8:39.26	39	—N/a		Did not advance	

Field events

Athlete	Event	Qualification		Final	
Athlete	Event	Distance	Position	Distance	Position
Martin Kupper	Discus throw	62.10	19	Did not advance	
Magnus Kirt	Javelin throw	88.36	2 Q	86.21	2nd place, silver medalist(s)
Kristo Galeta	Shot put	DNS	—	Did not advance	

Combined events – Decathlon

Athlete	Event	100 m	LJ	SP	HJ	400 m	110H	DT	PV	JT	1500 m	Final	Rank
Maicel Uibo	Result	11.10 SB	7.46 SB	15.12 PB	2.17 SB	50.44 SB	14.43 PB	46.64 SB	5.40 PB	63.83 SB	4:31.51 SB	8604 PB	2nd place, silver medalist(s)
Maicel Uibo	Points	838	925	797	963	794	920	801	1035	796	735	8604 PB	2nd place, silver medalist(s)
Janek Õiglane	Result	10.94 PB	7.32	15.20	1.96	49.14 PB	15.13	43.37	5.00	72.46 PB	4:36.24	8297 SB	6
Janek Õiglane	Points	874	891	802	767	855	834	733	910	927	704	8297 SB	6
