= Estonia at the World Athletics Indoor Championships =

- WA code: EST
- National federation: EKJL
- Website: ekjl.ee
- Medals Ranked 65th: Gold 0 Silver 3 Bronze 2 Total 5

World Athletics Indoor Championships appearances (overview)
- 1993; 1995; 1997; 1999; 2001; 2003; 2004; 2006; 2008; 2010; 2012; 2014; 2016; 2018; 2022; 2024

Estonia has participated in all the World Athletics Indoor Championships since 1993. Estonia has won a total of 5 medals (3 silver, 2 bronze) and is 65th on the all time medal table.

== Summary ==
Championships	Athletes	Gold	Silver	Bronze	Total	Rank
1993 Toronto	2	0	0	0	0	–
1995 Barcelona	3	0	0	0	0	–
1997 Paris	2	0	1	0	1	21st
1999 Maebashi	1	0	1	0	1	20th
2001 Lisbon	1	0	0	0	0	–
2003 Birmingham	2	0	0	0	0	–
2004 Budapest	2	0	0	0	0	–
2006 Moscow	1	0	0	0	0	–
2008 Valencia	3	0	0	0	0	–
2010 Doha	3	0	0	0	0	–
2012 Istanbul	2	0	0	0	0	–
2014 Sopot	2	0	0	0	0	–
2016 Portland	2	0	0	0	0	–
2018 Birmingham	2	0	0	1	1	24th
2022 Belgrade	5	0	0	0	0	–
2024 Glasgow	3	0	0	1	1	27th
2025 Nanjing	5	0	1	0	1	19th
Total		0	3	2	5	65th

== Medalists ==
Medal	Name	Edition	Event
Silver	Erki Nool	1997 Paris	Men's heptathlon
Silver	Erki Nool	1999 Maebashi	Men's heptathlon
Silver	Johannes Erm	2025 Nanjing	Men's heptathlon
Bronze	Maicel Uibo	2018 Birmingham	Men's heptathlon
Bronze	Johannes Erm	2024 Glasgow	Men's heptathlon

== 2018 ==
Estonia participated at the 2018 IAAF World Indoor Championships in Birmingham with 2 athletes, 1 male and 1 female.

Athlete	Event	Result	Place
Ksenija Balta	Women's long jump	6.57	8th
Maicel Uibo	Men's heptathlon	6265	3rd place, bronze medalist(s)

== See also ==
- Estonia at the World Championships in Athletics
