= Estonia at the 2013 World Championships in Athletics =

- WA code: EST
- National federation: Eesti Kergejõustikuliit
- Website: www.ekjl.ee

in Moscow
- Competitors: 9 (5 men and 4 women) in 7 events
- Medals Ranked 33rd: Gold 0 Silver 0 Bronze 1 Total 1

World Championships in Athletics appearances (overview)
- 1993; 1995; 1997; 1999; 2001; 2003; 2005; 2007; 2009; 2011; 2013; 2015; 2017; 2019; 2022; 2023; 2025

Estonia competed at the 2013 World Championships in Athletics in Moscow, Russia, from 10–18 August 2013 and won 1 bronze medal.

== Medalists ==
The following competitor from Estonia won a medal at the Championships

Medal	Athlete	Event
Bronze	Gerd Kanter	Discus throw

== Results ==
=== Men ===
==== 400 metres hurdles ====
Athlete	Heat		Semifinal		Final	
Athlete	Result	Rank	Result	Rank	Result	Rank
Rasmus Mägi	49.63	10	49.42	16	–	–

==== Decathlon ====
Mikk Pahapill	Event	Results	Points	Rank
	100 m	11.33	789	29
	Long jump	7.12	842	26
	Shot put	14.87	782	3
	High jump	1.99	794	16
	400 m	49.84	822	21
	110 m hurdles	14.54	906	14
	Discus throw	47.57	820	3
	Pole vault	5.00	910	10
	Javelin throw	62.89	781	13
	1500 m	4:33.16	714	12
Total			8170	17

Maicel Uibo	Event	Results	Points	Rank
	100 m	11.21	814	27
	Long jump	7.26	876	22
	Shot put	13.68	709	25
	High jump	2.11	906	3
	400 m	50.60	787	24
	110 m hurdles	15.29	815	25
	Discus throw	41.84	702	22
	Pole vault	4.90	880	12
	Javelin throw	59.63	732	18
	1500 m	4:48.29	629	25
Total			7850	19

==== Discus throw ====
Athlete	Qualification		Final	
Athlete	Result	Rank	Result	Rank
Gerd Kanter	65.54	2	65.19	3rd place, bronze medalist(s)

==== Javelin throw ====
Athlete	Qualification		Final	
Athlete	Result	Rank	Result	Rank
Risto Mätas	80.18	12	80.03	9

=== Women ===
==== Heptathlon ====
Athlete	100m hurdles		High jump		Shot put		200m		Long jump		Javelin throw		800m		Total	
Athlete	Result	Points	Result	Points	Result	Points	Result	Points	Result	Points	Result	Points	Result	Points	Points	Rank
Grit Šadeiko	13.40	1065	1.77	941	11.49	627	24.46	937	6.11	883	DNS	–	–	–	–	DNF
Mari Klaup	13.99	980	1.74	903	12.85	717	25.54	838	5.77	780	50.15	863	2:18.57	26	5924	21

==== High jump ====
Athlete	Qualification		Final	
Athlete	Result	Rank	Result	Rank
Anna Iljuštšenko	1.88	16	–	–

==== Javelin throw ====
Athlete	Qualification		Final	
Athlete	Result	Rank	Result	Rank
Liina Laasma	56.93	24	–	–
