= Estonia at the 2017 World Championships in Athletics =

- Flag of Estonia
- WA code: EST
- National federation: Estonian Athletic Association
- Website: www.ekjl.ee/home (in Estonian)

in London, United Kingdom 4–13 August 2017
- Competitors: 14 (11 men and 3 women) in 8 events
- Medals: Gold 0 Silver 0 Bronze 0 Total 0

World Championships in Athletics appearances (overview)
- 1993; 1995; 1997; 1999; 2001; 2003; 2005; 2007; 2009; 2011; 2013; 2015; 2017; 2019; 2022; 2023

Estonia competed at the 2017 World Championships in Athletics in London, Great Britain, from 4–13 August 2017.

== Results ==
=== Men ===
Track and road events

Athlete	Event	Heat		Semifinal		Final	
Athlete	Event	Result	Rank	Result	Rank	Result	Rank
Roman Fosti	Marathon	—				2:23:28 SB	53
Tiidrek Nurme	Marathon	—				2:20:41 SB	40
Jaak-Heinrich Jagor	400 metres hurdles	49.81	20 Q	50.43	19	Did not advance	
Rasmus Mägi	400 metres hurdles	DNS	–	Did not advance			

Field events

Athlete	Event	Qualification		Final	
Athlete	Event	Distance	Position	Distance	Position
Gerd Kanter	Discus throw	63.61	9 q	60.00	12
Martin Kupper	Discus throw	62.71	17	Did not advance	
Magnus Kirt	Javelin throw	83.86	10 Q	80.48	11
Tanel Laanmäe	Javelin throw	76.41	25	Did not advance	

Combined events – Decathlon

Athlete	Event	100 m	LJ	SP	HJ	400 m	110H	DT	PV	JT	1500 m	Final	Rank
Janek Õiglane	Result	11.08 PB	7.33	15.13	2.05 PB	49.58 PB	14.56 SB	42.11	5.10 =PB	71.73 PB	4:39.24	8371 PB	4
Janek Õiglane	Points	843	893	798	850	834	903	708	941	916	685	8371 PB	4
Karl Robert Saluri	Result	10.55 SB	7.49	13.98	1.84	47.76	15.36	40.43	5.00 PB	57.12	4:31.31 SB	8025 SB	13
Karl Robert Saluri	Points	963	932	727	661	921	807	673	910	695	736	8025 SB	13
Maicel Uibo	Result	11.35	6.97	14.08	2.02	50.61 SB	14.90	47.88	NH	–	–	DNF	–
Maicel Uibo	Points	784	807	733	822	787	862	826	0			DNF	–

=== Women ===
Field events

Athlete	Event	Qualification		Final	
Athlete	Event	Distance	Position	Distance	Position
Ksenija Balta	Long jump	6.15	25	Did not advance	
Anna Maria Orel	Hammer throw	67.37	18	Did not advance	

Combined events – Heptathlon

Athlete	Event	100H	HJ	SP	200 m	LJ	JT	800 m	Final	Rank
Grit Šadeiko	Result	13.37	1.74	12.55	24.60	6.00	47.47	2:18.88	6094	13
Grit Šadeiko	Points	1069	903	698	924	850	811	839	6094	13
