= Estonia at the 2022 World Athletics Championships =

Estonia at the 2022 World Championships in Athletics
- Flag of Estonia
- WA code: EST
- National federation: Estonian Athletic Association
- Website: ekjl.ee

in Eugene, Oregon, United States 15 July 2022 – 24 July 2022
- Competitors: 5 (4 men and 1 woman) in 3 events

World Championships in Athletics appearances (overview)
- 1993; 1995; 1997; 1999; 2001; 2003; 2005; 2007; 2009; 2011; 2013; 2015; 2017; 2019; 2022; 2023

Estonia competed at the 2022 World Athletics Championships in Eugene, Oregon, United States, from 15 to 24 July 2022. Estonia entered 5 athletes.

== Results ==
=== Men ===
Track and road events

| Athlete | Event | Heat | | Semi-final | | Final | |
| Athlete | Event | Result | Rank | Result | Rank | Result | Rank |
|---|---|---|---|---|---|---|---|
| Rasmus Mägi | 400 metres hurdles | 48.78 | 2 Q | 48.40 | 6 q | 48.92 | 8 |

Combined events – Decathlon

| Athlete | Event | 100 m | LJ | SP | HJ | 400 m | 110H | DT | PV | JT | 1500 m | Final | Rank |
|---|---|---|---|---|---|---|---|---|---|---|---|---|---|
| Johannes Erm | Result | 10.94 | 7.37 SB | 15.01 PB | 1.93 | 47.02 PB | 14.38 SB | 44.18 | 4.70 | 56.87 | 4:25.08 PB | 8227 | 9 |
| Johannes Erm | Points | 874 | 903 | 790 | 740 | 957 | 926 | 750 | 819 | 691 | 777 | 8227 | 9 |
| Maicel Uibo | Result | 11.14 SB | 7.32 | 15.17 PB | 2.11 | 50.38 SB | 14.49 SB | 46.52 | 5.30 | 63.54 | 4:37.58 | 8425 SB | 7 |
| Maicel Uibo | Points | 830 | 891 | 800 | 906 | 797 | 912 | 798 | 1004 | 791 | 696 | 8425 SB | 7 |
| Janek Õiglane | Result | 11.12 | 7.26 SB | 14.83 | 2.05 =PB | 49.16 SB | 14.69 | 30.49 | DNS | – | – | DNF | – |
| Janek Õiglane | Points | 834 | 876 | 779 | 850 | 854 | 887 | 474 | 0 | | | DNF | – |

=== Women ===
Field events

| Athlete | Event | Qualification | | Final | |
| Athlete | Event | Result | Position | Result | Position |
|---|---|---|---|---|---|
| Karmen Bruus | High jump | 1.93 PB | 6 Q | 1.96 =NR, =WU18B | 7 |
