= Estonia at the 2005 World Championships in Athletics =

- WA code: EST
- National federation: Eesti Kergejõustikuliit
- Website: www.ekjl.ee/uudised

in Helsinki
- Competitors: 9 (7 men and 2 women) in 7 events
- Medals Ranked 13th: Gold 1 Silver 1 Bronze 0 Total 2

World Championships in Athletics appearances (overview)
- 1993; 1995; 1997; 1999; 2001; 2003; 2005; 2007; 2009; 2011; 2013; 2015; 2017; 2019; 2022; 2023; 2025

Estonia competed at the 2005 World Championships in Athletics.

== Medalists ==
Medal	Name	Event
Gold	Andrus Värnik	Men's javelin throw
Silver	Gerd Kanter	Men's discus throw
