= Estonia at the 2015 World Championships in Athletics =

- WA code: EST
- Website: www.ekjl.ee

in Beijing
- Competitors: 15 (11 men and 4 women) in 9 events
- Medals: Gold 0 Silver 0 Bronze 0 Total 0

World Championships in Athletics appearances (overview)
- 1993; 1995; 1997; 1999; 2001; 2003; 2005; 2007; 2009; 2011; 2013; 2015; 2017; 2019; 2022; 2023; 2025

Estonia competed at the 2015 World Championships in Athletics in Beijing, China, from 22–30 August 2015.

== Results ==
(q – qualified, NM – no mark, SB – season best)

=== Men ===
Track and road events

Athlete	Event	Heat		Semifinal		Final	
Athlete	Event	Result	Rank	Result	Rank	Result	Rank
Rasmus Mägi	400 metres hurdles	49.18	2 Q	48.76	5	Did not advance	
Jaak-Heinrich Jagor	400 metres hurdles	50.29	8	Did not advance			
Roman Fosti	Marathon	—N/a				2:20:35	20
Kaur Kivistik	3000 metres steeplechase	8:56.36	11	—N/a		Did not advance	

Field events

Athlete	Event	Qualification		Final	
Athlete	Event	Distance	Position	Distance	Position
Gerd Kanter	Discus throw	64.78	3 q	64.82	4
Martin Kupper	Discus throw	61.59	16	Did not advance	
Tanel Laanmäe	Javelin throw	80.65	13	Did not advance	
Magnus Kirt	Javelin throw	78.84	22	Did not advance	
Risto Mätas	Javelin throw	81.56	11 q	76.79	12

Combined events – Decathlon

Athlete	Event	100 m	LJ	SP	HJ	400 m	110H	DT	PV	JT	1500 m	Final	Rank
Maicel Uibo	Result	11.25	7.13	14.45	2.13	50.24 PB	15.01	43.69	5.10	64.51 PB	4:25.53 PB	8245	10
Maicel Uibo	Points	806	845	756	925	804	848	740	941	806	774	8245	10
Janek Õiglane	Result	11.51	6.78	14.43	1.92	50.95 PB	15.33	40.94 PB	4.60 SB	68.51	4:43.06	7581	19
Janek Õiglane	Points	750	762	755	731	771	810	684	790	867	661	7581	19

=== Women ===
Track and road events

Athlete	Event	Heat		Semifinal		Final	
Athlete	Event	Result	Rank	Result	Rank	Result	Rank
Liina Luik	Marathon	—N/a				2:39:42 PB	27
Lily Luik	Marathon	—N/a				2:45:22 SB	38

Field events

Athlete	Event	Qualification		Final	
Athlete	Event	Distance	Position	Distance	Position
Eleriin Haas	High jump	1.85	25	Did not advance	

Combined events – Heptathlon

Athlete	Event	100H	HJ	SP	200 m	LJ	JT	800 m	Final	Rank
Grit Šadeiko	Result	13.36	1.77	12.05	24.41	6.22	47.48	2:17.32	6213	15
Grit Šadeiko	Points	1071	941	664	942	918	817	860	6213	15

== Sources ==
- Estonian team
