= Estonia at the 2001 World Championships in Athletics =

- WA code: EST
- National federation: Eesti Kergejõustikuliit
- Website: www.ekjl.ee/uudised

in Edmonton
- Competitors: 2 (2 men and 0 women) in 2 events
- Medals Ranked 30th: Gold 0 Silver 1 Bronze 0 Total 1

World Championships in Athletics appearances (overview)
- 1993; 1995; 1997; 1999; 2001; 2003; 2005; 2007; 2009; 2011; 2013; 2015; 2017; 2019; 2022; 2023; 2025

Estonia competed at the 2001 World Championships in Athletics.

== Medalists ==
Medal	Name	Event
Silver	Erki Nool	Men's decathlon
