= Maicel =

Maicel is a given name. Notable people with the name include:

- Maicel Malone-Wallace (born 1969), American sprinter
- Maicel Uibo (born 1992), Estonian decathlete
