= Estonia at the 2011 World Championships in Athletics =

- WA code: EST
- National federation: Eesti Kergejõustikuliit
- Website: www.ekjl.ee

in Daegu
- Competitors: 9 (6 men and 3 women) in 8 events
- Medals Ranked 21st: Gold 0 Silver 1 Bronze 0 Total 1

World Championships in Athletics appearances (overview)
- 1993; 1995; 1997; 1999; 2001; 2003; 2005; 2007; 2009; 2011; 2013; 2015; 2017; 2019; 2022; 2023; 2025

Estonia competed at the 2011 World Championships in Athletics from 27 August–4 September.

== Team selection ==
A team of 10 athletes was announced in preparation for the competition. Selected athletes have achieved one of the competition's qualifying standards. Javelin thrower Risto Mätas was registered as a reserve athlete.

The following athlete appeared on the preliminary Entry List, but not on the Official Start List of the specific event, resulting in a total number of 9 competitors:

KEY:	Did not participate	Competed in another event

	Event	Athlete
Men	Javelin throw	Risto Mätas^{R}

== Medalists ==
The following competitor from Estonia won a medal at the Championships

Medal	Athlete	Event
Silver	Gerd Kanter	Discus throw

== Results ==
=== Men ===
==== 100 metres ====
Athlete	Heat		Semifinal		Final	
Athlete	Result	Rank	Result	Rank	Result	Rank
Marek Niit	10.53	32	Did not qualify			

==== 200 metres ====
Athlete	Heat		Semifinal		Final	
Athlete	Result	Rank	Result	Rank	Result	Rank
Marek Niit	20.90	29	Did not qualify			

==== Decathlon ====
Athlete	100m		Long jump		Shot put		High jump		400m		110m hurdles		Discus throw		Pole vault		Javelin throw		1500m		Total	
Athlete	Result	Points	Result	Points	Result	Points	Result	Points	Result	Points	Result	Points	Result	Points	Result	Points	Result	Points	Result	Points	Points	Rank
Mikk Pahapill	11.28	799	7.12	842	14.76	775	2.02	822	50.65	785	14.54	906	47.16	811	4.90	880	66.40	835	4:35.41	709	8164	9
Andres Raja	10.85	894	7.21	864	14.61	766	1.99	794	49.47	839	14.04	969	43.39	734	4.70	819	57.35	698	4:52.28	605	7982	15

==== Discus throw ====
Athlete	Qualification		Final	
Athlete	Result	Rank	Result	Rank
Märt Israel	64.19	7	65.20	4
Gerd Kanter	63.50	9	66.95	2nd place, silver medalist(s)

==== Javelin throw ====
Athlete	Qualification		Final	
Athlete	Result	Rank	Result	Rank
Mihkel Kukk	76.42	23	Did not qualify	

=== Women ===
==== 400 metres ====
Athlete	Heat		Semifinal		Final	
Athlete	Result	Rank	Result	Rank	Result	Rank
Maris Mägi	52.93	22	53.27	21	Did not qualify	

==== Heptathlon ====
Athlete	100m hurdles		High jump		Shot put		200m		Long jump		Javelin throw		800m		Total	
Athlete	Result	Points	Result	Points	Result	Points	Result	Points	Result	Points	Result	Points	Result	Points	Points	Rank
Grit Šadeiko	13.44	1059	1.74	903	11.46	625	24.39	944	6.28	937	42.84	722	DNF	0	5190	26

==== High jump ====
Athlete	Qualification		Final	
Athlete	Result	Rank	Result	Rank
Anna Iljuštšenko	1.95	12	1.89	11
