= Estonia at the 2007 World Championships in Athletics =

- WA code: EST
- National federation: Eesti Kergejõustikuliit
- Website: www.ekjl.ee/uudised

in Osaka 25 August 2007 – 2 September 2007
- Competitors: 9 (8 men and 1 woman) in 6 events
- Medals Ranked 15th: Gold 1 Silver 0 Bronze 0 Total 1

World Championships in Athletics appearances (overview)
- 1993; 1995; 1997; 1999; 2001; 2003; 2005; 2007; 2009; 2011; 2013; 2015; 2017; 2019; 2022; 2023; 2025

Estonia competed at the 2007 World Championships in Athletics.

== Medalists ==
Medal	Name	Event
Gold	Gerd Kanter	Men's discus throw

== Participants ==
Key

- Note–Ranks given for track events are within the athlete's heat only
- Q = Qualified for the next round
- q = Qualified for the next round as a fastest loser or, in field events, by position without achieving the qualifying target

=== Men ===
==== Track and road events ====
Event	Athletes	Heats		Quarterfinal		Semifinal		Final	
Event	Athletes	Result	Rank	Result	Rank	Result	Rank	Result	Rank
110 m hurdles	Tarmo Jallai	14.16 SB	38	Did not advance					
Marathon	Pavel Loskutov	—N/a						DNF	

==== Field events ====
Event	Athletes	Qualification		Final	
Event	Athletes	Result	Rank	Result	Rank
Discus throw	Gerd Kanter	67.45	1 Q	68.94	1st place, gold medalist(s)
Discus throw	Märt Israel	60.23	22	Did not advance	
Discus throw	Aleksander Tammert	64.41	7 q	64.33	8
Javelin throw	Andrus Värnik	75.96 SB	24	Did not advance	
Javelin throw	Marko Jänes	69.65	34	Did not advance	

==== Decathlon ====
Andres Raja	Decathlon			
Andres Raja	Event	Results	Points	Rank
	100 m	10.92	878	
	Long jump	7.42	915	
	Shot put	14.26	744	
	High jump	1.85	670	
	400 m	48.89	866	
	110 m hurdles	14.51	910	
	Discus throw	37.07	605	
	Pole vault	4.70	819	
	Javelin throw	60.34	743	
	1500 m	4:45.83	644	
Total			7794	16

=== Women ===
==== Heptathlon ====
Kaie Kand	Heptathlon			
Kaie Kand	Event	Results	Points	Rank
	100 m hurdles	14.22	947	
	High jump	1.68	830	
	Shot put	12.69	707	
	200 m	25.84	811	
	Long jump	5.75	774	
	Javelin throw	38.33	635	
	800 m	2:13.63	912	
Total			5616	30
