= 2017 World Championships in Athletics – Men's decathlon =

Men's decathlon at the 2017 World Championships
- Venue: Olympic Stadium
- Dates: 11–12 August
- Competitors: 34 from 23 nations
- Points: 8768

Medalists
gold medal	Kevin Mayer	France
silver medal	Rico Freimuth	Germany
bronze medal	Kai Kazmirek	Germany

Video on YouTube Official Video

The men's decathlon at the 2017 World Championships in Athletics was held at the Olympic Stadium on 11–12 August.

== Summary ==
Before the competition started, there were a lot of athletes considered to be possible medal contenders. World leader Rico Freimuth (GER), Götzis winner Damian Warner (CAN) had shown solid performances throughout the season. Olympic silver medallist Kevin Mayer(FRA) had the best PB of the athletes, but had not done a decathlon in 2017. Ilya Shkurenev (ANA) had scored more than 8600 points, but hadn't been competing with the rest of the decathletes for nearly two years because of the ban of the Russian team. Another question mark was behind Trey Hardee (USA), the champion of 2009 and 2011. If he was able to reproduce his form of earlier years, he could be a contender as well.

The first four times in the 100 metres were Warner, Freimuth, Karl Robert Saluri (EST) and Mayer. Warner's 10.50 was the best of the day but not as exceptional as his PB of 10.15. Sutthisak Singkhon (THA) had the best long jump, though still over 20 cm short of his best from July, his 7.65 m (25 ft 1 in) jump was a centimeter longer than Kai Kazmirek (GER), who moved into contention behind his teammate Freimuth and the other top 100 runners. In the shot put, Meyer assumed the lead with the second best throw 15.72 m (51 ft 6 3/4 in) behind Lindon Victor (GRN) 15.86. Hardee moved into third. Kazmirek moved into second place with the best high jump of the day 2.11 m (6 ft 11 in), but Mayer maintained the lead as one of several to clear 2.08 m. And Kazmirek ended the first day still in second with the best 400 of 47.17 as Mayer's 48.26 kept him close enough to maintain the lead.

Starting the second day, Warner's 13.63 hurdles put him back in third, with Freimuth and Mayer close behind to take the top two positions. Both Hardee and Shkurenev disappeared from the leader board after crashing over the fourth hurdle. With a 51.17 m (167 ft 10 1/2 in) discus throw, Freimuth gained over 4 metres on Mayer and pulled to within 24 points. A 48.79 m put Oleksiy Kasyanov (UKR) into third. Pau Tonnesen (ESP) had the best pole vault at 5.40 m but he was out of contention. Kazmirek and Mayer tied at the next best height 5.10 m (16 ft 8 3/4 in) to allow Mayer to separate in the lead and Kazmirek to move back to third. Janek Õiglane (EST) threw the javelin a PB 71.73 m in the javelin to move into fourth place, Mayer's 66.10 m (216 ft 10 1/4 in) was more than 3 and a half metres longer than the German teammates, giving him a solid lead going in to the final event. Mayer's 4:36.73 1500 beat both Germans to win going away. Kazmirek beat Freimuth by three and a half seconds in the race, but still finished 76 points behind him in the final tally.

The competition is notable for being the second decathlon in the World Championships history with the highest fraction of athletes (over 41%) not finishing the competition. The decathlon during the 1997 World Championships in Athletics similarly featured 34 athletes, of whom 14 were non-finishers.

== Records ==
Before the competition records were as follows:

Record	Perf.	Athlete	Nat.	Date	Location
World	9045	Ashton Eaton	USA	29 Aug 2015	Beijing, China
Championship	9045	Ashton Eaton	USA	29 Aug 2015	Beijing, China
World leading	8663	Rico Freimuth	GER	25 Jun 2017	Ratingen, Germany
African	8521	Larbi Bourrada	ALG	18 Aug 2016	Rio de Janeiro, Brazil
Asian	8725	Dmitriy Karpov	KAZ	24 Aug 2004	Athens, Greece
NACAC	9045	Ashton Eaton	USA	29 Aug 2015	Beijing, China
South American	8393	Carlos Chinin	BRA	8 Jun 2013	São Paulo, Brazil
European	9026	Roman Šebrle	CZE	27 May 2001	Götzis, Austria
Oceanian	8490	Jagan Hames	AUS	18 Sep 1998	Kuala Lumpur, Malaysia

The following records were set at the competition:

Record	Perf.	Athlete	Nat.	Date
World leading	8768	Kevin Mayer	FRA	12 Aug 2017

== Qualification standards ==
The standard to qualify automatically for entry was 8100 points.

== Schedule ==
The event schedule, in local time (UTC+1), was as follows:

Date	Time	Round
11 August	10:00	100 metres
11 August	11:05	Long jump
11 August	12:55	Shot put
11 August	17:00	High jump
11 August	20:45	400 metres
12 August	10:00	110 metres hurdles
12 August	11:00	Discus throw
12 August	13:30	Pole vault
12 August	17:30	Javelin throw
12 August	20:45	1500 metres

== Results ==
=== 100 metres ===
The 100 metres took place on 11 August in four heats as follows:

Heat	1	2	3	4
Start time	10:00	10:09	10:18	10:29
Wind (m/s)	−0.2	−0.8	−1.3	−1.7
Photo finish	link	link	link	link

The overall results were as follows:

Rank	Heat	Lane	Name	Nationality	Time	Points	Notes
1	4	6	Damian Warner	Canada	10.50	975	
2	4	8	Rico Freimuth	Germany	10.53	968	SB
3	4	7	Karl Robert Saluri	Estonia	10.55	963	SB
4	2	3	Kevin Mayer	France	10.70	929	PB
5	1	8	Mihail Dudaš	Serbia	10.75	917	SB
6	4	9	Trey Hardee	United States	10.75	917	
7	4	1	Oleksiy Kasyanov	Ukraine	10.77	912	
8	1	5	Larbi Bourrada	Algeria	10.80	906	SB
9	4	5	Lindon Victor	Grenada	10.83	899	
10	3	2	Martin Roe	Norway	10.90	883	
11	2	8	Kai Kazmirek	Germany	10.91	881	SB
12	4	2	Devon Williams	United States	10.93	876	
13	4	3	Eelco Sintnicolaas	Netherlands	10.96	870	
14	4	4	Zach Ziemek	United States	10.99	863	
15	2	4	Jorge Ureña	Spain	11.00	861	SB
16	3	9	Dominik Distelberger	Austria	11.03	854	
17	2	6	Cedric Dubler	Australia	11.06	847	
18	3	5	Akihiko Nakamura	Japan	11.06	847	
19	3	7	Luiz Alberto de Araújo	Brazil	11.07	845	
20	1	7	Kurt Felix	Grenada	11.08	843	SB
21	1	4	Janek Õiglane	Estonia	11.08	843	PB
22	2	5	Ashley Bryant	Great Britain & N.I.	11.14	830	SB
23	3	8	Mathias Brugger	Germany	11.15	827	
24	3	6	Sutthisak Singkhon	Thailand	11.16	825	
25	3	1	Ilya Shkurenyov	Authorised Neutral Athletes	11.17	823	
26	2	9	Pieter Braun	Netherlands	11.22	812	
27	3	4	Fredrik Samuelsson	Sweden	11.24	808	
28	1	2	Pau Tonnesen	Spain	11.26	804	PB
29	3	3	Adam Helcelet	Czech Republic	11.28	799	
30	2	2	Maicel Uibo	Estonia	11.35	784	
31	1	9	Thomas van der Plaetsen	Belgium	11.35	784	SB
32	1	3	Bastien Auzeil	France	11.35	784	SB
33	1	6	Keisuke Ushiro	Japan	11.53	746	
34	2	7	Leonel Suárez	Cuba	15.93	94	
	2	1	Jefferson Santos	Brazil	DNS		

=== Long jump ===
The long jump took place on 11 August in two groups both starting at 11:11. The results were as follows:

Rank	Group	Name	Nationality	Round			Result	Points	Notes	Overall	
Rank	Group	Name	Nationality	1	2	3	Result	Points	Notes	Pts	Rank
1	B	Sutthisak Singkhon	Thailand	x	7.12	7.65	7.65	972		1797	9
2	A	Kai Kazmirek	Germany	7.29	7.64	5.48	7.64	970	SB	1851	5
3	B	Ilya Shkurenyov	Authorised Neutral Athletes	x	7.29	7.62	7.62	965	SB	1788	12
4	B	Kevin Mayer	France	7.33	7.37	7.52	7.52	940		1869	4
5	A	Martin Roe	Norway	7.06	7.50	7.45	7.50	935	PB	1818	8
6	B	Karl Robert Saluri	Estonia	7.30	7.29	7.49	7.49	932		1895	3
7	B	Rico Freimuth	Germany	7.11	7.48	7.45	7.48	930		1898	1
8	A	Trey Hardee	United States	7.48	7.29	7.33	7.48	930	SB	1847	6
9	A	Mihail Dudaš	Serbia	7.41	x	7.46	7.46	925	SB	1842	7
10	B	Kurt Felix	Grenada	x	x	7.46	7.46	925		1768	14
11	B	Devon Williams	United States	x	7.39	7.44	7.44	920		1796	10
12	B	Ashley Bryant	Great Britain & N.I.	x	7.26	7.44	7.44	920		1750	16
13	B	Damian Warner	Canada	5.72	7.27	7.44	7.44	920		1895	2
14	A	Janek Õiglane	Estonia	7.33	6.97	x	7.33	893		1736	18
15	B	Eelco Sintnicolaas	Netherlands	x	7.31	-	7.31	888		1758	15
16	B	Jorge Ureña	Spain	7.21	7.30	7.18	7.30	886		1747	17
17	B	Cedric Dubler	Australia	6.90	7.29	6.87	7.29	883		1730	19
18	B	Akihiko Nakamura	Japan	x	7.28	7.24	7.28	881		1728	20
19	B	Oleksiy Kasyanov	Ukraine	x	x	7.28	7.28	881		1793	11
20	A	Larbi Bourrada	Algeria	7.04	7.22	7.20	7.22	866		1772	13
21	B	Pau Tonnesen	Spain	x	7.21	x	7.21	864		1668	25
22	A	Mathias Brugger	Germany	7.06	7.18	x	7.18	857		1684	24
23	B	Pieter Braun	Netherlands	6.96	x	7.17	7.17	854		1666	26
24	A	Fredrik Samuelsson	Sweden	7.04	7.11	7.07	7.11	840		1648	27
25	A	Dominik Distelberger	Austria	6.85	x	7.11	7.11	840		1694	23
26	A	Thomas van der Plaetsen	Belgium	x	x	7.09	7.09	835		1619	29
27	B	Zach Ziemek	United States	7.02	7.08	x	7.08	833		1696	22
28	B	Adam Helcelet	Czech Republic	7.03	7.00	6.99	7.03	821		1620	28
29	A	Lindon Victor	Grenada	x	6.86	6.98	6.98	809		1708	21
30	A	Maicel Uibo	Estonia	x	6.97	x	6.97	807		1591	30
31	A	Bastien Auzeil	France	6.70	6.74	6.87	6.87	783		1567	31
32	A	Keisuke Ushiro	Japan	6.57	6.52	6.64	6.64	729		1475	32
	A	Luiz Alberto de Araújo	Brazil	x	r		NM	0		845	
	A	Leonel Suárez	Cuba				DNS			DNF	
	A	Jefferson Santos	Brazil				DNS			DNF	

=== Shot Put ===
The shot put took place on 11 August in two groups both starting at 12:55. The results were as follows:

Rank	Group	Name	Nationality	Round			Result	Points	Notes	Overall	
Rank	Group	Name	Nationality	1	2	3	Result	Points	Notes	Pts	Rank
1	B	Lindon Victor	Grenada	15.14	15.86	15.05	15.86	843		2551	10
2	B	Kevin Mayer	France	15.72	15.43	x	15.72	834	SB	2703	1
3	B	Bastien Auzeil	France	15.23	x	x	15.23	804		2371	25
4	B	Martin Roe	Norway	14.66	14.79	15.22	15.22	803		2621	5
5	B	Trey Hardee	United States	15.16	14.94	14.89	15.16	800		2647	3
6	B	Janek Õiglane	Estonia	14.83	14.65	15.13	15.13	798		2534	12
7	B	Kurt Felix	Grenada	14.83	15.01	x	15.01	790		2558	9
8	B	Oleksiy Kasyanov	Ukraine	14.75	14.71	14.99	14.99	789	SB	2582	7
9	B	Rico Freimuth	Germany	14.85	x	14.26	14.85	780		2678	2
10	B	Mathias Brugger	Germany	14.32	14.33	14.80	14.80	777		2461	20
11	B	Adam Helcelet	Czech Republic	x	14.57	x	14.57	763		2383	23
12	B	Pieter Braun	Netherlands	13.33	14.48	14.23	14.48	758		2424	22
13	A	Devon Williams	United States	13.50	13.53	14.43	14.43	755		2551	11
14	A	Eelco Sintnicolaas	Netherlands	14.29	14.32	14.25	14.32	748		2506	14
15	B	Ashley Bryant	Great Britain & N.I.	14.09	13.80	x	14.09	734		2484	17
16	A	Maicel Uibo	Estonia	13.34	14.08	13.80	14.08	733		2324	28
17	A	Zach Ziemek	United States	13.75	14.01	x	14.01	729	SB	2425	21
18	A	Karl Robert Saluri	Estonia	13.91	13.98	13.98	13.98	727		2622	4
19	A	Jorge Ureña	Spain	13.74	x	13.91	13.91	723		2470	18
20	A	Fredrik Samuelsson	Sweden	13.68	13.82	x	13.82	717		2365	26
21	B	Kai Kazmirek	Germany	13.60	13.78	13.68	13.78	715		2566	8
22	B	Pau Tonnesen	Spain	13.30	13.76	r	13.76	714		2382	24
23	A	Ilya Shkurenyov	Authorised Neutral Athletes	13.38	13.48	13.39	13.48	697		2485	16
24	B	Damian Warner	Canada	13.13	x	13.45	13.45	695		2590	6
25	B	Keisuke Ushiro	Japan	13.43	13.23	13.22	13.43	693		2168	32
26	A	Larbi Bourrada	Algeria	12.44	13.41	13.08	13.41	692	SB	2464	19
27	A	Sutthisak Singkhon	Thailand	13.34	x	x	13.34	688		2485	15
28	A	Thomas van der Plaetsen	Belgium	11.99	x	13.03	13.03	669	SB	2288	31
29	A	Mihail Dudaš	Serbia	12.68	12.95	13.02	13.02	668		2510	13
30	A	Dominik Distelberger	Austria	12.77	x	12.93	12.93	663		2357	27
31	A	Akihiko Nakamura	Japan	11.25	x	11.37	11.37	568		2296	30
32	A	Cedric Dubler	Australia	11.18	11.24	11.36	11.36	568	SB	2298	29
	B	Luiz Alberto de Araújo	Brazil				DNS			DNF	
	A	Leonel Suárez	Cuba				DNS			DNF	
	A	Jefferson Santos	Brazil				DNS			DNF	

=== High jump ===
The high jump took place on 11 August in two groups, Group A started at 17:00 and Group B at 17:01. The results were as follows:

Rnk	Grp	Athlete	Nationality	1.81	1.84	1.87	1.90	1.93	1.96	1.99	2.02	2.05	2.08	2.11	2.14	Res	Pts	Nts	Overall	
Rnk	Grp	Athlete	Nationality	1.81	1.84	1.87	1.90	1.93	1.96	1.99	2.02	2.05	2.08	2.11	2.14	Res	Pts	Nts	Pts	Rnk
1	A	Kai Kazmirek	Germany	-	-	-	-	-	o	-	o	o	xo	o	xxx	2.11	906	SB	3472	2
2	A	Pau Tonnesen	Spain	-	-	-	-	-	o	o	o	o	o	xxx		2.08	878		3260	16
3	A	Ilya Shkurenyov	Authorised Neutral Athletes	-	-	-	-	-	xo	o	o	xo	o	xxx		2.08	878		3363	9
3	A	Jorge Ureña	Spain	-	-	-	o	-	o	o	o	xxo	o	xxx		2.08	878		3348	11
5	A	Cedric Dubler	Australia	-	-	-	-	-	-	o	-	xo	xo	xxx		2.08	878	SB	3176	22
5	A	Kevin Mayer	France	-	-	-	-	-	o	o	xo	o	xo	xxx		2.08	878		3581	1
7	A	Kurt Felix	Grenada	-	-	-	-	-	o	-	o	o	xxo	xxx		2.08	878	SB	3436	5
8	A	Janek Õiglane	Estonia	-	-	-	o	o	o	o	o	xo	xxx			2.05	850	PB	3384	8
9	A	Maicel Uibo	Estonia	-	-	-	-	-	-	o	o	xxx				2.02	822		3146	25
10	B	Oleksiy Kasyanov	Ukraine	-	-	-	o	o	o	xo	xo	xxx				2.02	822	SB	3404	7
11	B	Mihail Dudaš	Serbia	-	o	-	o	-	o	o	xxo	xxx				2.02	822	SB	3332	13
11	A	Adam Helcelet	Czech Republic	-	-	-	o	o	o	o	xxo	xxx				2.02	822		3205	20
13	A	Damian Warner	Canada	-	-	-	o	o	xo	x	xxo	xxx				2.02	822		3412	6
14	A	Lindon Victor	Grenada	-	-	-	-	o	o	o	xxx					1.99	794		3345	12
15	A	Zach Ziemek	United States	-	-	-	-	-	xo	o	xxx					1.99	794		3219	19
16	B	Trey Hardee	United States	-	-	-	o	-	xo	xo	xxx					1.99	794	SB	3441	4
17	B	Rico Freimuth	Germany	-	o	o	xo	o	xo	xo	xxx					1.99	794		3472	3
18	B	Thomas van der Plaetsen	Belgium	-	-	-	o	-	o	xxx						1.96	767		3055	28
19	B	Ashley Bryant	Great Britain & N.I.	-	o	o	xo	o	o	xxx						1.96	767		3251	17
19	B	Keisuke Ushiro	Japan	-	o	o	o	xo	o	xxx						1.96	767	SB	2935	30
21	B	Akihiko Nakamura	Japan	-	o	o	o	xo	xo	xxx						1.96	767	SB	3063	27
21	B	Bastien Auzeil	France	-	-	-	xo	o	xo	xxx						1.96	767		3138	26
23	B	Devon Williams	United States	-	-	o	o	xxo	xxo	xxx						1.96	767		3318	14
24	A	Pieter Braun	Netherlands	-	-	xxo	o	xxx								1.93	740		3164	24
25	B	Martin Roe	Norway	o	o	o	o	xo	xxx							1.93	740		3361	10
26	B	Eelco Sintnicolaas	Netherlands	o	-	o	o	xxx								1.90	714		3220	18
26	B	Mathias Brugger	Germany	-	-	-	o	xxx								1.90	714		3175	23
26	A	Larbi Bourrada	Algeria	-	-	-	o	r								1.90	714		3178	21
29	B	Dominik Distelberger	Austria	-	o	o	xxx									1.87	687		3044	29
30	B	Karl Robert Saluri	Estonia	o	o	xxx										1.84	661		3283	15
	A	Fredrik Samuelsson	Sweden													DNS			DNF	
	A	Sutthisak Singkhon	Thailand													DNS			DNF	

=== 400 metres ===
The 400 metres took place on 11 August in four heats as follows:

Heat	1	2	3	4
Start time	20:44	20:54	20:02	21:11
Photo finish	link	link	link	link

The overall results were as follows:

Rank	Heat	Athlete	Nationality	Result	Points	Notes	Overall	
Rank	Heat	Athlete	Nationality	Result	Points	Notes	Pts	Rank
1	4	Kai Kazmirek	Germany	47.19	949	SB	4421	2
2	4	Damian Warner	Canada	47.47	943	SB	4347	4
3	4	Karl Robert Saluri	Estonia	47.76	921		4204	14
4	1	Mihail Dudaš	Serbia	48.08	905	SB	4237	8
5	4	Devon Williams	United States	48.11	904	PB	4222	11
6	4	Dominik Distelberger	Austria	48.13	903	SB	3947	23
7	1	Kevin Mayer	France	48.26	897	PB	4478	1
8	2	Cedric Dubler	Australia	48.31	894	SB	4070	18
9	3	Rico Freimuth	Germany	48.41	889	SB	4361	3
10	2	Pieter Braun	Netherlands	48.54	883	SB	4047	19
11	3	Oleksiy Kasyanov	Ukraine	48.64	878	SB	4282	7
12	2	Jorge Ureña	Spain	48.72	875	PB	4223	9
13	3	Eelco Sintnicolaas	Netherlands	48.73	874		4094	17
14	2	Trey Hardee	United States	48.78	872	SB	4313	5
15	3	Akihiko Nakamura	Japan	48.98	862		3925	26
16	3	Ilya Shkurenyov	Authorised Neutral Athletes	49.02	860		4223	9
17	2	Martin Roe	Norway	49.09	857	SB	4218	12
18	3	Kurt Felix	Grenada	49.09	857		4293	6
19	2	Ashley Bryant	Great Britain & N.I.	49.24	850	SB	4101	16
20	4	Lindon Victor	Grenada	49.30	847		4192	15
21	2	Adam Helcelet	Czech Republic	49.51	837		4042	20
22	1	Janek Õiglane	Estonia	49.58	834	PB	4218	12
23	2	Zach Ziemek	United States	50.32	800		4019	22
24	1	Bastien Auzeil	France	50.36	798	SB	3936	24
25	1	Maicel Uibo	Estonia	50.61	787	SB	3933	25
26	1	Pau Tonnesen	Spain	50.85	776	SB	4036	21
27	1	Keisuke Ushiro	Japan	51.43	750	SB	3685	27
	3	Fredrik Samuelsson	Sweden	DNS			DNF	
	3	Larbi Bourrada	Algeria	DNS			DNF	
	4	Mathias Brugger	Germany	DNS			DNF	
	4	Sutthisak Singkhon	Thailand	DNS			DNF	
	1	Thomas van der Plaetsen	Belgium	DNS			DNF	

=== 110 metres hurdles ===
The 110 metres hurdles took place on 12 August in four heats as follows:

Heat	1	2	3	4
Start time	9:59	10:07	10:15	10:23
Wind (m/s)	−0.5	+1.2	+0.4	−0.1
Photo finish	link	link	link	link

The overall results were as follows:

Rank	Heat	Athlete	Nationality	Result	Points	Notes	Overall	
Rank	Heat	Athlete	Nationality	Result	Points	Notes	Pts	Rank
1	4	Damian Warner	Canada	13.63	1023		5370	3
2	4	Rico Freimuth	Germany	13.68	1016	SB	5377	2
3	4	Kevin Mayer	France	13.75	1007	PB	5485	1
4	4	Oleksiy Kasyanov	Ukraine	14.05	968		5250	5
5	3	Jorge Ureña	Spain	14.15	955	SB	5178	7
6	4	Devon Williams	United States	14.27	940		5162	8
7	3	Eelco Sintnicolaas	Netherlands	14.32	934		5028	11
8	3	Adam Helcelet	Czech Republic	14.38	926		4968	15
9	3	Akihiko Nakamura	Japan	14.43	920		4845	20
10	1	Janek Õiglane	Estonia	14.56	903	SB	5121	9
11	2	Pau Tonnesen	Spain	14.57	902		4938	16
12	3	Dominik Distelberger	Austria	14.59	900		4847	19
13	2	Bastien Auzeil	France	14.59	900	SB	4836	21
14	2	Kai Kazmirek	Germany	14.66	891		5312	4
15	2	Pieter Braun	Netherlands	14.67	890		4937	17
16	1	Kurt Felix	Grenada	14.68	889	SB	5182	6
17	2	Ashley Bryant	Great Britain & N.I.	14.75	880		4981	14
18	1	Maicel Uibo	Estonia	14.90	862		4795	23
19	3	Cedric Dubler	Australia	14.92	859		4929	18
20	1	Martin Roe	Norway	15.15	831	PB	5049	10
21	1	Keisuke Ushiro	Japan	15.35	808		4493	24
22	1	Karl Robert Saluri	Estonia	15.36	807		5011	12
22	2	Lindon Victor	Grenada	15.36	807		4999	13
22	3	Zach Ziemek	United States	15.36	807		4826	22
	2	Mihail Dudaš	Serbia	DQ	0	R 168.7	4237	26
	4	Ilya Shkurenyov	Authorised Neutral Athletes	DQ	0	R 168.7(b)	4223	27
	4	Trey Hardee	United States	DQ	0	R 168.7(b)	4313	25

=== Discus throw ===
The discus throw took place on 12 August in two groups, Group A started at 11:00 and Group B at 12:10. The results were as follows:

Rank	Group	Name	Nationality	Round			Result	Points	Notes	Overall	
Rank	Group	Name	Nationality	1	2	3	Result	Points	Notes	Pts	Rank
1	B	Rico Freimuth	Germany	44.71	51.17	r	51.17	895		6272	2
2	B	Oleksiy Kasyanov	Ukraine	45.34	47.43	48.79	48.79	845	SB	6095	3
3	B	Martin Roe	Norway	40.06	48.24	x	48.24	834		5883	8
4	A	Bastien Auzeil	France	45.65	47.88	46.21	47.88	826		5641	17
5	A	Maicel Uibo	Estonia	45.65	47.88	46.21	47.88	826		5621	19
6	B	Keisuke Ushiro	Japan	45.45	47.64	43.02	47.64	821	SB	5314	23
7	A	Zach Ziemek	United States	41.10	47.32	46.92	47.32	815	SB	5641	17
8	A	Kevin Mayer	France	x	47.14	x	47.14	811		6296	1
9	B	Kurt Felix	Grenada	x	45.39	x	45.39	775		5957	6
10	A	Kai Kazmirek	Germany	42.94	x	45.06	45.06	768		6080	4
11	A	Adam Helcelet	Czech Republic	x	44.71	x	44.71	761	SB	5729	11
12	B	Devon Williams	United States	44.29	x	x	44.29	752		5914	7
13	B	Ashley Bryant	Great Britain & N.I.	43.95	43.23	41.67	43.95	745	SB	5726	12
14	A	Pau Tonnesen	Spain	x	31.34	43.07	43.07	727	SB	5665	15
15	A	Mihail Dudaš	Serbia	42.69	41.94	43.23	43.23	730		4967	25
16	A	Dominik Distelberger	Austria	41.99	43.18	x	43.18	729	SB	5576	21
17	B	Pieter Braun	Netherlands	39.19	39.71	42.59	42.59	717		5654	16
18	A	Janek Õiglane	Estonia	37.31	42.11	40.89	42.11	708		5829	9
19	A	Cedric Dubler	Australia	37.34	38.14	40.85	40.85	682	SB	5611	20
20	B	Damian Warner	Canada	36.91	x	40.67	40.67	678		6048	5
21	B	Karl Robert Saluri	Estonia	36.75	x	40.43	40.43	673		5684	14
22	A	Eelco Sintnicolaas	Netherlands	40.25	x	x	40.25	670		5698	13
23	B	Jorge Ureña	Spain	33.02	36.33	x	36.33	590		5768	10
24	B	Akihiko Nakamura	Japan	32.70	32.82	33.65	33.65	537		5382	22
	B	Lindon Victor	Grenada	x	x	x	NM	0		4999	24
	A	Trey Hardee	United States	x	x	x	NM	0		4313	26
	A	Ilya Shkurenyov	Authorised Neutral Athletes				DNS			DNF	

=== Pole vault ===
The pole vault took place on 12 August in two groups, Group A started at 12:58 and Group B at 14:08. The results were as follows:

Rnk	Grp	Athlete	Nationality	3.80	4.00 (Note: Everyone in Group B passed 3.90 so that height is not shown)	4.20 (Note: Everyone in Group B passed 4.10 so that height is not shown)	4.30	4.40	4.50	4.60	4.70	4.80	4.90	5.00	5.10	5.20	5.30	5.40	5.50	Res	Pts	Nts	Overall	
Rnk	Grp	Athlete	Nationality	3.80	4.00	4.20	4.30	4.40	4.50	4.60	4.70	4.80	4.90	5.00	5.10	5.20	5.30	5.40	5.50	Res	Pts	Nts	Pts	Rnk
1	A	Pau Tonnesen	Spain			-	-	-	-	-	-	-	o	-	xo	o	xxo	o	xxx	5.40	1035	SB	6700	9
2=	A	Zach Ziemek	United States			-	-	-	-	-	-	-	-	o	o	xxx				5.10	941		6582	14
2=	A	Janek Õiglane	Estonia			-	-	-	-	-	o	-	xo	xo	o	xxx				5.10	941	PB	6770	6
2=	A	Kai Kazmirek	Germany			-	-	-	-	-	-	xo	-	xxo	xo	xxx				5.10	941		7021	3
2=	A	Kevin Mayer	France			-	-	-	-	-	-	-	-	-	xxo	-	xxx			5.10	941		7237	1
6=	A	Dominik Distelberger	Austria			-	-	-	-	o	-	o	-	o	xxx					5.00	910		6486	17
6=	B	Karl Robert Saluri	Estonia	-	-	-	-	-	-	o	-	o	o	o	xxx					5.00	910	PB	6594	13
8	B	Jorge Ureña	Spain	-	-	-	-	-	-	o	-	o	xxo	o	xxx					5.00	910	SB	6678	10
9=	A	Cedric Dubler	Australia			-	-	-	-	-	xo	-	xo	xxx						4.90	880		6491	15
9=	A	Adam Helcelet	Czech Republic			-	-	-	-	o	-	xo	xo	xxx						4.90	880		6609	12
11=	A	Bastien Auzeil	France			-	-	-	-	xo	-	xo	xxx							4.80	849		6490	16
11=	B	Rico Freimuth	Germany	-	-	-	-	-	-	xo	o	xo	xxx							4.80	849		7121	2
13=	B	Damian Warner	Canada	-	-	-	-	-	-	o	o	xxx								4.70	819	SB	6867	5
13=	B	Akihiko Nakamura	Japan	-	-	-	-	-	-	o	o	xxx								4.70	819		6201	20
13=	B	Oleksiy Kasyanov	Ukraine	-	-	-	-	-	o	o	o	xxx								4.70	819	SB	6914	4
16	B	Pieter Braun	Netherlands	-	-	-	-	-	-	-	xxo	xxx								4.70	819		6473	18
17	B	Keisuke Ushiro	Japan	-	-	-	-	-	xo	xo	xxx									4.60	790		6104	21
18	B	Devon Williams	United States	-	-	-	-	o	o	xxo	xxx									4.60	790		6704	8
19	B	Martin Roe	Norway	-	o	o	o	o	o	xxx										4.50	760	SB	6643	11
20	B	Kurt Felix	Grenada	-	-	-	xxo	o	xo	xxx										4.50	760	SB	6717	7
21	B	Ashley Bryant	Great Britain & N.I.	-	-	o	xo	xxx												4.30	702		6428	19
	B	Lindon Victor	Grenada	xr																NH	0		4999	23
	A	Maicel Uibo	Estonia			-	-	-	-	-	-	-	xxr							NH	0		5621	22
	A	Eelco Sintnicolaas	Netherlands																	DNS			DNF	
	A	Ilya Shkurenyov	Authorised Neutral Athletes																	DNS			DNF	
	A	Mihail Dudaš	Serbia																	DNS			DNF	
	A	Trey Hardee	United States																	DNS			DNF	

=== Javelin throw ===
The javelin throw took place on 12 August in two groups, Group A started at 17:30 and Group B at 18:55. The results were as follows:

Rank	Group	Name	Nationality	Round			Result	Points	Notes	Overall	
Rank	Group	Name	Nationality	1	2	3	Result	Points	Notes	Pts	Rank
1	B	Janek Õiglane	Estonia	69.01	71.73	70.68	71.73	916	PB	7686	4
2	A	Adam Helcelet	Czech Republic	71.56	69.37	68.29	71.56	913	PB	7522	7
3	A	Ashley Bryant	Great Britain & N.I.	66.76	61.82	67.97	67.97	858	SB	7286	15
4	B	Kevin Mayer	France	66.10	-	x	66.10	830		8067	1
5	B	Kurt Felix	Grenada	64.32	64.64	x	64.64	808		7525	6
6	A	Keisuke Ushiro	Japan	63.28	60.82	63.04	63.28	787		6891	20
7	B	Kai Kazmirek	Germany	62.45	60.51	57.90	62.45	775	SB	7796	3
8	B	Rico Freimuth	Germany	62.34	61.89	60.25	62.34	773	SB	7894	2
9	A	Bastien Auzeil	France	60.80	x	x	60.80	750		7240	16
10	B	Pieter Braun	Netherlands	52.82	59.26	x	59.26	727		7200	17
11	A	Zach Ziemek	United States	51.05	53.63	58.35	58.35	713	SB	7295	13
12	A	Martin Roe	Norway	57.38	58.30	58.29	58.30	712		7355	12
13	A	Devon Williams	United States	49.86	57.93	56.52	57.93	707		7411	9
14	B	Karl Robert Saluri	Estonia	57.06	55.62	57.12	57.12	695		7289	14
15	B	Damian Warner	Canada	54.66	56.63	x	56.63	687		7554	5
16	A	Dominik Distelberger	Austria	56.46	x	x	56.46	685		7171	18
17	B	Jorge Ureña	Spain	56.06	55.01	x	56.06	679		7357	11
18	A	Pau Tonnesen	Spain	55.13	x	x	55.13	665		7365	10
19	B	Akihiko Nakamura	Japan	53.38	49.84	54.22	54.22	651	SB	6852	21
20	A	Cedric Dubler	Australia	51.82	51.53	52.10	52.10	620		7111	19
21	B	Oleksiy Kasyanov	Ukraine	48.63	50.82	x	50.82	601		7515	8

=== 1500 metres ===
The 1500 metres took place on 12 August at 20:55. The results were as follows (photo finish):

Rank	Athlete	Nationality	Result	Points	Notes	Overall	
Rank	Athlete	Nationality	Result	Points	Notes	Pts	Rank
1	Akihiko Nakamura	Japan	4:22.62	794		7646	19
2	Jorge Ureña	Spain	4:26.46	768		8125	9
3	Ashley Bryant	Great Britain & N.I.	4:27.15	763	PB	8049	11
4	Damian Warner	Canada	4:28.39	755	SB	8309	5
5	Karl Robert Saluri	Estonia	4:31.31	736	SB	8025	13
6	Oleksiy Kasyanov	Ukraine	4:33.86	719		8234	6
7	Kurt Felix	Grenada	4:36.62	702	SB	8227	7
8	Kevin Mayer	France	4:36.73	701	SB	8768	1
9	Adam Helcelet	Czech Republic	4:36.85	700	SB	8222	8
10	Kai Kazmirek	Germany	4:38.07	692	SB	8488	3
11	Pieter Braun	Netherlands	4:38.40	690		7890	16
12	Dominik Distelberger	Austria	4:39.15	686		7857	17
13	Martin Roe	Norway	4:39.24	685		8040	12
14	Janek Õiglane	Estonia	4:39.24	685		8371	4
15	Bastien Auzeil	France	4:39.80	682	SB	7922	15
16	Devon Williams	United States	4:40.50	677		8088	10
17	Rico Freimuth	Germany	4:41.57	670		8564	2
18	Pau Tonnesen	Spain	4:46.31	641	SB	8006	14
19	Cedric Dubler	Australia	4:50.31	617		7728	18
20	Keisuke Ushiro	Japan	4:51.90	607		7498	20
	Zach Ziemek	United States	DNS	0		DNF	

=== Final standings ===
The final standings were as follows:

The highest mark recorded in each event is highlighted in yellow. The best scores for each event were split between eight competitors. The gold medallist claimed none of them although he placed second in three events and finished in the top eight for the other seven.

Rank	Athlete	Nationality	100m	LJ	SP	HJ	400m	110mh	DT	PV	JT	1500m	Total	Notes
1st place, gold medalist(s)	Kevin Mayer	France	10.70	7.52	15.72	2.08	48.26	13.75	47.14	5.10	66.10	4:36.73	8768	WL
2nd place, silver medalist(s)	Rico Freimuth	Germany	10.53	7.48	14.85	1.99	48.41	13.68	51.17	4.80	62.34	4:41.57	8564	
3rd place, bronze medalist(s)	Kai Kazmirek	Germany	10.91	7.64	13.78	2.11	47.19	14.66	45.06	5.10	62.45	4:38.07	8488	SB
4	Janek Õiglane	Estonia	11.08	7.33	15.13	2.05	49.58	14.56	42.11	5.10	71.73	4:39.24	8371	PB
5	Damian Warner	Canada	10.50	7.44	13.45	2.02	47.47	13.63	40.67	4.70	56.63	4:28.39	8309	
6	Oleksiy Kasyanov	Ukraine	10.77	7.28	14.99	2.02	48.64	14.05	48.79	4.70	50.82	4:33.86	8234	
7	Kurt Felix	Grenada	11.08	7.46	15.01	2.08	49.09	14.68	45.39	4.50	64.64	4:36.62	8227	
8	Adam Helcelet	Czech Republic	11.28	7.03	14.57	2.02	49.51	14.38	44.71	4.90	71.56	4:36.85	8222	
9	Jorge Ureña	Spain	11.00	7.30	13.91	2.08	48.72	14.15	36.33	5.00	56.06	4:26.46	8125	PB
10	Devon Williams	United States	10.93	7.44	14.43	1.96	48.11	14.27	44.29	4.60	57.93	4:40.50	8088	
11	Ashley Bryant	Great Britain & N.I.	11.14	7.44	14.09	1.96	49.24	14.75	43.95	4.30	67.97	4:27.15	8049	
12	Martin Roe	Norway	10.90	7.50	15.22	1.93	49.09	15.15	48.24	4.50	58.30	4:39.24	8040	
13	Karl Robert Saluri	Estonia	10.55	7.49	13.98	1.84	47.76	15.36	40.43	5.00	57.12	4:31.31	8025	SB
14	Pau Tonnesen	Spain	11.26	7.21	13.76	2.08	50.85	14.57	43.07	5.40	55.13	4:46.31	8006	
15	Bastien Auzeil	France	11.35	6.87	15.23	1.96	50.36	14.59	46.86	4.80	60.80	4:39.80	7922	SB
16	Pieter Braun	Netherlands	11.22	7.17	14.48	1.93	48.54	14.67	42.59	4.70	59.26	4:38.40	7890	
17	Dominik Distelberger	Austria	11.03	7.11	12.93	1.87	48.13	14.59	43.18	5.00	56.46	4:39.15	7857	
18	Cedric Dubler	Australia	11.06	7.29	11.36	2.08	48.31	14.92	40.85	4.90	52.10	4:50.31	7728	
19	Akihiko Nakamura	Japan	11.06	7.28	11.37	1.96	48.98	14.43	33.65	4.70	54.22	4:22.62	7646	
20	Keisuke Ushiro	Japan	11.53	6.64	13.43	1.96	51.43	15.35	47.64	4.60	63.28	4:51.90	7498	
	Zach Ziemek	United States	10.99	7.08	14.01	1.99	50.32	15.36	47.32	5.10	58.35	DNS	DNF	
	Eelco Sintnicolaas	Netherlands	10.96	7.31	14.32	1.90	48.73	14.32	40.25	DNS	–	–	DNF	
	Maicel Uibo	Estonia	11.35	6.97	14.08	2.02	50.61	14.90	47.88	NM	DNS	–	DNF	
	Lindon Victor	Grenada	10.83	6.98	15.86	1.99	49.30	15.36	NM	NM	–	–	DNF	
	Mihail Dudaš	Serbia	10.75	7.46	13.02	2.02	48.08	DQ	43.23	DNS	–	–	DNF	
	Trey Hardee	United States	10.75	7.48	15.16	1.99	48.78	DQ	NM	DNS	–	–	DNF	
	Ilya Shkurenev	Authorised Neutral Athletes	11.17	7.62	13.48	2.08	49.02	DQ	DNS	–	–	–	DNF	
	Larbi Bourrada	Algeria	10.80	7.22	13.41	1.90	DNS	–	–	–	–	–	DNF	
	Mathias Brugger	Germany	11.15	7.18	14.80	1.90	DNS	–	–	–	–	–	DNF	
	Thomas van der Plaetsen	Belgium	11.35	7.09	13.03	1.96	DNS	–	–	–	–	–	DNF	
	Sutthisak Singkhon	Thailand	11.16	7.65	13.34	DNS	–	–	–	–	–	–	DNF	
	Fredrik Samuelsson	Sweden	11.24	7.11	13.82	DNS	–	–	–	–	–	–	DNF	
	Luiz Alberto de Araújo	Brazil	11.07	NM	DNS	–	–	–	–	–	–	–	DNF	
	Leonel Suárez	Cuba	15.93	DNS	–	–	–	–	–	–	–	–	DNF	
	Jefferson Santos	Brazil	DNS	–	–	–	–	–	–	–	–	–	DNS	
