= Norway at the 2019 World Athletics Championships =

Norway at the 2019 World Championships in Athletics
- WA code: NOR
- National federation: Norwegian Athletics Association

in Doha, Qatar 27 September 2019 – 6 October 2019
- Competitors: 17 (12 men and 5 women) in 17 events
- Medals Ranked 17th: Gold 1 Silver 0 Bronze 0 Total 1

World Championships in Athletics appearances (overview)
- 1980; 1983; 1987; 1991; 1993; 1995; 1997; 1999; 2001; 2003; 2005; 2007; 2009; 2011; 2013; 2015; 2017; 2019; 2022; 2023; 2025

Norway competed at the 2019 World Athletics Championships in Doha, Qatar, from 27 September to 6 October 2019.

== Results ==
The Norwegian Athletics Association named the first athletes of the team on 12 September 2019. 17 athletes (12 men and five women) competed in 17 events.

=== Men ===
Track and road events

| Athlete | Event | Heat | | Semifinal | | Final | |
| Athlete | Event | Result | Rank | Result | Rank | Result | Rank |
|---|---|---|---|---|---|---|---|
| Filip Ingebrigtsen | 1500 metres | 3:37.26 | 13 Q | 3:37.00 | 14 | did not advance | |
| Jakob Ingebrigtsen | 1500 metres | 3:37.67 | 16 Q | 3:36.58 | 4 Q | 3:31.70 | 4 |
| Henrik Ingebrigtsen | 5000 metres | 13:21.22 | 7 q | —N/a | | 13:36.25 | 13 |
| Filip Ingebrigtsen | 5000 metres | 13:20.52 | 3 Q | —N/a | | DNF | |
| Jakob Ingebrigtsen | 5000 metres | 13:25.20 | 12 Q | —N/a | | 13:02.93 | 5 |
| Sondre Nordstad Moen | 10,000 metres | —N/a | | | | 28:02.18 | 12 |
| Karsten Warholm | 400 metres hurdles | 49.27 | 3 Q | 48.28 | 1 Q | 47.42 | (gold) |
| Tom Erling Kårbø | 3000 metres steeplechase | 8:27.01 | 25 | —N/a | | did not advance | |
| Weldu Negash Gebretsadik | Marathon | —N/a | | | | 2:16:35 | 24 |
| Håvard Haukenes | 50 kilometres walk | —N/a | | | | DQ | |

Field events

| Athlete | Event | Qualification | | Final | |
| Athlete | Event | Distance | Position | Distance | Position |
|---|---|---|---|---|---|
| Sondre Guttormsen | Pole vault | 5.30 | 29 | did not advance | |
| Ola Stunes Isene | Discus throw | 64.54 | 6 q | 63.67 | 10 |
| Eivind Henriksen | Hammer throw | 76.46 | 8 Q | 77.38 | 6 |

Combined events – Decathlon

| Athlete | Event | 100 m | LJ | SP | HJ | 400 m | 110H | DT | PV | JT | 1500 m | Final | Rank |
|---|---|---|---|---|---|---|---|---|---|---|---|---|---|
| Martin Roe | Result | 10.94 | 7.28 | 15.08 | 1.87 | DQ | 15.86 | 47.18 | 4.60 | 60.61 | 5:08.91 | 6845 | 18 |
| Martin Roe | Points | 874 | 881 | 795 | 687 | 0 | 749 | 812 | 790 | 747 | 510 | 6845 | 18 |

=== Women ===
Track and road events

| Athlete | Event | Heat | | Semifinal | | Final | |
| Athlete | Event | Result | Rank | Result | Rank | Result | Rank |
|---|---|---|---|---|---|---|---|
| Hedda Hynne | 800 metres | 2:02.49 | 16 Q | 2:01.03 | 12 | did not advance | |
| Karoline Bjerkeli Grøvdal | 5000 metres | DNF | | —N/a | | did not advance | |
| Amalie Iuel | 400 metres hurdles | 54.72 NR | 2 Q | 55.03 | 10 | did not advance | |
| Karoline Bjerkeli Grøvdal | 3000 metres steeplechase | 9:28.84 | 11 q | —N/a | | 9:29.41 | 13 |

Field events

| Athlete | Event | Qualification | | Final | |
| Athlete | Event | Distance | Position | Distance | Position |
|---|---|---|---|---|---|
| Lene Retzius | Pole vault | 4.35 | 25 | did not advance | |
| Beatrice Nedberge Llano | Hammer throw | 65.55 | 28 | did not advance | |
