= 2019 World Athletics Championships – Men's decathlon =

Men's decathlon at the 2019 World Championships
- Venue: Khalifa International Stadium
- Dates: 2–4 October
- Competitors: 23 from 16 nations
- Winning points: 8691

Medalists
| gold medal | Niklas Kaul | Germany |
| silver medal | Maicel Uibo | Estonia |
| bronze medal | Damian Warner | Canada |

The men's decathlon at the 2019 World Athletics Championships was held at the Khalifa International Stadium in Doha from 2 to 4 October.

Because of the timetable, with the last competition finishing after midnight local time on 4 October, the technical rules of decathlon were modified: since this edition, the decathlon has to be completed in a period of two 24 hours rather than over two consecutive days as before. Niklas Kaul was the winner of the competition.

The best scores for each event were shared by only five competitors which is quite a low number in a competition of global calibre.

== Records ==
Before the competition records were as follows:

| World record | Kevin Mayer (FRA) | 9126 pts | Talence, France | 16 September 2018 |
| Championship record | Ashton Eaton (USA) | 9045 pts | Beijing, China | 29 August 2015 |
| World Leading | Damian Warner (CAN) | 8711 pts | Götzis, Austria | 26 May 2019 |
| African Record | Larbi Bourrada (ALG) | 8521 pts | Rio de Janeiro, Brazil | 18 August 2016 |
| Asian Record | Dmitriy Karpov (KAZ) | 8725 pts | Athens, Greece | 24 August 2004 |
| North, Central American and Caribbean record | Ashton Eaton (USA) | 9045 pts | Beijing, China | 29 August 2015 |
| South American Record | Carlos Chinin (BRA) | 8393 pts | São Paulo, Brazil | 8 June 2013 |
| European Record | Kevin Mayer (FRA) | 9126 pts | Talence, France | 16 September 2018 |
| Oceanian record | Jagan Hames (AUS) | 8490 pts | Kuala Lumpur, Malaysia | 18 September 1998 |

For the current records in each discipline see Decathlon bests.

The following records were set at the competition:

| Record | Discipline | Perf. | Athlete | Nat. | Date |
|---|---|---|---|---|---|
| CDB | Javeline throw | 79.05m | Niklas Kaul | GER | 3 Oct 2019 |

== Qualification standard ==
The standard to qualify automatically for entry was 8200 points.

== Schedule ==
The event schedule, in local time (UTC+3), was as follows:

| Date | Time | Round |
|---|---|---|
| 2 October | 16:35 | 100 metres |
| 2 October | 17:30 | Long jump |
| 2 October | 18:50 | Shot put |
| 2 October | 20:40 | High jump |
| 2 October | 23:15 | 400 metres |
| 3 October | 16:35 | 110 metres hurdles |
| 3 October | 17:30 | Discus throw |
| 3 October | 19:05 | Pole vault |
| 3 October | 22:05 | Javelin throw |
| 4 October | 00:25 | 1500 metres |

== Results ==
=== 100 metres ===
The 100 metres event started on 2 October at 16:35.

| Heat | 1 | 2 | 3 |
|---|---|---|---|
| Start time | 16:35 | 16:43 | 16:51 |
| Wind (m/s) | +0.3 | +0.4 | +0.8 |

| Rank | Heat | Name | Nationality | Time | Points | Notes |
|---|---|---|---|---|---|---|
| 1 | 3 | Damian Warner | Canada | 10.35 | 1011 | |
| 2 | 3 | Pierce LePage | Canada | 10.36 | 1008 | |
| 3 | 3 | Kevin Mayer | France | 10.50 | 975 | PB |
| 4 | 3 | Lindon Victor | Grenada | 10.66 | 938 | |
| 5 | 3 | Solomon Simmons | United States | 10.70 | 929 | |
| 6 | 3 | Cedric Dubler | Australia | 10.75 | 917 | |
| 7 | 3 | Harrison Williams | United States | 10.76 | 915 | |
| 8 | 2 | Paweł Wiesiołek | Poland | 10.76 | 915 | SB |
| 9 | 2 | Kai Kazmirek | Germany | 10.82 | 901 | SB |
| 10 | 2 | Devon Williams | United States | 10.84 | 897 | |
| 11 | 2 | Georni Jaramillo | Venezuela | 10.88 | 888 | |
| 12 | 2 | Martin Roe | Norway | 10.94 | 874 | |
| 13 | 1 | Janek Õiglane | Estonia | 10.94 | 874 | PB |
| 14 | 2 | Vital Zhuk | Belarus | 10.95 | 872 | |
| 15 | 1 | Ilya Shkurenyov | Authorised Neutral Athletes | 11.02 | 856 | SB |
| 16 | 1 | Maicel Uibo | Estonia | 11.10 | 838 | SB |
| 17 | 1 | Tim Nowak | Germany | 11.12 | 834 | SB |
| 18 | 2 | Fredrik Samuelsson | Sweden | 11.13 | 832 | |
| 19 | 1 | Pieter Braun | Netherlands | 11.16 | 825 | |
| 20 | 1 | Niklas Kaul | Germany | 11.27 | 801 | |
| 21 | 1 | Thomas Van der Plaetsen | Belgium | 11.38 | 778 | |
| 22 | 2 | Basile Rolnin | France | 11.42 | 769 | |
| 23 | 1 | Keisuke Ushiro | Japan | 11.44 | 765 | |
| | 3 | Tim Duckworth | Great Britain & N.I. | DNS | | |

=== Long jump ===
The long jump event started on 2 October at 17:30.

| Rank | Group | Name | Nationality | Round | | | Result | Points | Notes | Overall | |
| Rank | Group | Name | Nationality | 1 | 2 | 3 | Result | Points | Notes | Pts | Rank |
|---|---|---|---|---|---|---|---|---|---|---|---|
| 1 | A | Pierce LePage | Canada | 7.79 | 7.64 | 7.75 | 7.79 | 1007 | | 2015 | 1 |
| 2 | A | Damian Warner | Canada | x | 7.41 | 7.67 | 7.67 | 977 | | 1988 | 2 |
| 3 | A | Ilya Shkurenyov | Authorised Neutral Athletes | x | 7.61 | x | 7.61 | 962 | | 1818 | 6 |
| 4 | A | Kevin Mayer | France | 7.43 | 7.48 | 7.56 | 7.56 | 950 | SB | 1925 | 3 |
| 5 | B | Lindon Victor | Grenada | 7.41 | 7.44 | 7.51 | 7.51 | 937 | PB | 1875 | 4 |
| 6 | A | Pieter Braun | Netherlands | 7.21 | 7.47 | 7.11 | 7.47 | 927 | | 1752 | 15 |
| 7 | B | Georni Jaramillo | Venezuela | 7.15 | 7.47 | 7.14 | 7.47 | 927 | | 1815 | 7 |
| 8 | B | Maicel Uibo | Estonia | 7.16 | x | 7.46 | 7.46 | 925 | SB | 1763 | 12 |
| 9 | B | Solomon Simmons | United States | x | 7.37 | x | 7.37 | 903 | | 1832 | 5 |
| 10 | A | Devon Williams | United States | 7.15 | 7.36 | x | 7.36 | 900 | | 1797 | 8 |
| 11 | B | Janek Õiglane | Estonia | 7.32 | x | 7.25 | 7.32 | 891 | | 1765 | 11 |
| 12 | A | Martin Roe | Norway | 7.01 | 7.03 | 7.28 | 7.28 | 881 | | 1755 | 14 |
| 13 | A | Kai Kazmirek | Germany | 7.11 | 7.26 | 6.84 | 7.26 | 876 | | 1777 | 10 |
| 14 | A | Cedric Dubler | Australia | 7.15 | 7.22 | 7.25 | 7.25 | 874 | | 1791 | 9 |
| 15 | A | Thomas Van der Plaetsen | Belgium | 7.20 | x | x | 7.20 | 862 | | 1640 | 20 |
| 16 | B | Niklas Kaul | Germany | 7.19 | 5.32 | 7.03 | 7.19 | 859 | | 1660 | 19 |
| 17 | B | Harrison Williams | United States | 7.14 | 7.03 | 7.07 | 7.14 | 847 | | 1762 | 13 |
| 18 | A | Fredrik Samuelsson | Sweden | 7.08 | 7.11 | 7.05 | 7.11 | 840 | | 1672 | 17 |
| 19 | B | Tim Nowak | Germany | 7.07 | x | 6.97 | 7.07 | 830 | | 1664 | 18 |
| 20 | B | Paweł Wiesiołek | Poland | 6.93 | 6.96 | 7.02 | 7.02 | 818 | | 1733 | 16 |
| 21 | B | Keisuke Ushiro | Japan | 6.47 | 6.76 | 6.90 | 6.90 | 790 | | 1555 | 22 |
| 22 | B | Vital Zhuk | Belarus | 6.57 | 6.07 | 6.63 | 6.63 | 727 | | 1599 | 21 |
| | B | Basile Rolnin | France | | | | DNS | 0 | | | |
| | A | Tim Duckworth | Great Britain & N.I. | | | | DNS | 0 | | | |

=== Shot put ===
The shot put event started on 2 October at 18:50.

| Rank | Group | Name | Nationality | Round | | | Result | Points | Notes | Overall | |
| Rank | Group | Name | Nationality | 1 | 2 | 3 | Result | Points | Notes | Pts | Rank |
|---|---|---|---|---|---|---|---|---|---|---|---|
| 1 | A | Kevin Mayer | France | 15.69 | 16.82 | – | 16.82 | 902 | PB | 2827 | 1 |
| 2 | A | Lindon Victor | Grenada | 14.96 | 16.24 | 16.23 | 16.24 | 866 | SB | 2741 | 3 |
| 3 | A | Georni Jaramillo | Venezuela | 15.42 | 15.19 | x | 15.42 | 816 | | 2631 | 6 |
| 4 | A | Solomon Simmons | United States | x | 15.33 | 15.02 | 15.33 | 810 | | 2642 | 5 |
| 5 | A | Pieter Braun | Netherlands | 15.26 | x | 14.72 | 15.26 | 806 | SB | 2558 | 10 |
| 6 | B | Paweł Wiesiołek | Poland | x | 14.52 | 15.26 | 15.26 | 806 | PB | 2539 | 12 |
| 7 | A | Janek Õiglane | Estonia | 15.00 | 14.72 | 15.20 | 15.20 | 802 | | 2567 | 8 |
| 8 | A | Damian Warner | Canada | 13.66 | 15.17 | 14.97 | 15.17 | 800 | | 2788 | 2 |
| 9 | A | Vital Zhuk | Belarus | 15.13 | 14.85 | 15.04 | 15.13 | 798 | | 2397 | 20 |
| 10 | B | Maicel Uibo | Estonia | 14.35 | 14.63 | 15.12 | 15.12 | 797 | PB | 2560 | 9 |
| 11 | A | Niklas Kaul | Germany | 15.10 | 14.89 | x | 15.10 | 796 | | 2456 | 16 |
| 12 | A | Martin Roe | Norway | 15.08 | 14.87 | x | 15.08 | 795 | | 2550 | 11 |
| 13 | B | Ilya Shkurenyov | Authorised Neutral Athletes | 14.48 | 14.47 | 14.71 | 14.71 | 772 | SB | 2590 | 7 |
| 14 | B | Tim Nowak | Germany | 13.65 | 14.69 | 14.48 | 14.69 | 771 | | 2435 | 17 |
| 15 | A | Keisuke Ushiro | Japan | 13.52 | 14.23 | 14.31 | 14.31 | 747 | | 2302 | 22 |
| 16 | B | Kai Kazmirek | Germany | 13.56 | 14.30 | 14.28 | 14.30 | 747 | | 2524 | 13 |
| 17 | B | Fredrik Samuelsson | Sweden | 13.77 | x | 13.97 | 13.97 | 727 | | 2399 | 19 |
| 18 | B | Harrison Williams | United States | 13.66 | 13.41 | 13.78 | 13.78 | 715 | | 2477 | 15 |
| 19 | B | Thomas Van der Plaetsen | Belgium | x | 13.78 | x | 13.78 | 715 | | 2355 | 21 |
| 20 | B | Devon Williams | United States | 13.76 | x | 13.63 | 13.76 | 714 | | 2511 | 14 |
| 21 | B | Pierce LePage | Canada | 13.21 | x | x | 13.21 | 680 | | 2695 | 4 |
| 22 | B | Cedric Dubler | Australia | 12.43 | 12.27 | 11.63 | 12.43 | 633 | | 2424 | 18 |
| | B | Tim Duckworth | Great Britain & N.I. | | | | DNS | | | | |
| | A | Basile Rolnin | France | | | | DNS | | | | |

=== High jump ===
The high jump event started on 2 October at 18:50.

| Rnk | Grp | Athlete | Nationality | 1.78 | 1.81 | 1.84 | 1.87 | 1.90 | 1.93 | 1.96 | 1.99 | 2.02 | 2.05 | 2.08 | 2.11 | 2.14 | 2.17 | 2.20 | Res | Pts | Nts | Overall | |
| Rnk | Grp | Athlete | Nationality | 1.78 | 1.81 | 1.84 | 1.87 | 1.90 | 1.93 | 1.96 | 1.99 | 2.02 | 2.05 | 2.08 | 2.11 | 2.14 | 2.17 | 2.20 | Res | Pts | Nts | Pts | Rnk |
|---|---|---|---|---|---|---|---|---|---|---|---|---|---|---|---|---|---|---|---|---|---|---|---|
| 1 | A | Maicel Uibo | Estonia | – | – | – | – | – | – | – | o | – | o | xo | xo | xo | xo | xxx | 2.17 | 963 | SB | 3523 | 5 |
| 2 | A | Ilya Shkurenyov | Authorised Neutral Athletes | – | – | – | – | o | – | o | o | xo | xo | xxo | xxo | r | | | 2.11 | 906 | SB | 3496 | 6 |
| 3 | A | Thomas Van der Plaetsen | Belgium | – | – | – | – | – | – | – | o | – | xxo | xo | xxx | | | | 2.08 | 878 | | 3233 | 17 |
| 4 | B | Lindon Victor | Grenada | – | – | – | – | o | o | o | o | o | xxo | xxx | | | | | 2.05 | 850 | SB | 3591 | 3 |
| 5 | A | Pierce LePage | Canada | – | – | – | – | – | – | – | o | – | xxo | r | | | | | 2.05 | 850 | | 3545 | 4 |
| 6 | B | Kai Kazmirek | Germany | – | – | – | – | – | o | – | o | xo | xxo | xxr | | | | | 2.05 | 850 | SB | 3374 | 9 |
| 7 | A | Cedric Dubler | Australia | – | – | – | – | – | – | – | xo | o | xxx | | | | | | 2.02 | 822 | | 3246 | 15 |
| 8 | B | Tim Nowak | Germany | – | – | – | – | o | – | o | xxo | o | xxx | | | | | | 2.02 | 822 | SB | 3257 | 13 |
| 9 | A | Niklas Kaul | Germany | – | – | – | – | – | – | o | o | xo | xxx | | | | | | 2.02 | 822 | | 3278 | 12 |
| 10 | A | Fredrik Samuelsson | Sweden | – | – | – | – | o | – | xo | xxo | xo | xxx | | | | | | 2.02 | 822 | | 3221 | 18 |
| 11 | B | Damian Warner | Canada | – | – | – | – | o | o | o | xo | xxo | xxx | | | | | | 2.02 | 822 | SB | 3610 | 2 |
| 12 | B | Pieter Braun | Netherlands | – | – | – | – | o | xo | o | xo | xxo | r | | | | | | 2.02 | 822 | SB | 3380 | 8 |
| 13 | B | Kevin Mayer | France | – | – | – | o | – | xo | xxo | xxo | xxx | | | | | | | 1.99 | 794 | SB | 3621 | 1 |
| 14 | A | Vital Zhuk | Belarus | – | – | o | o | o | o | xo | xxx | | | | | | | | 1.96 | 767 | | 3164 | 20 |
| 15 | B | Janek Õiglane | Estonia | – | – | o | o | o | xo | xo | xxx | | | | | | | | 1.96 | 767 | | 3334 | 10 |
| 16 | B | Solomon Simmons | United States | – | – | o | o | xo | xo | xxo | xxr | | | | | | | | 1.96 | 767 | | 3409 | 7 |
| 17 | A | Paweł Wiesiołek | Poland | – | – | xo | – | o | xo | xxo | xxx | | | | | | | | 1.96 | 767 | | 3306 | 11 |
| 18 | A | Harrison Williams | United States | – | – | o | – | o | o | xxx | | | | | | | | | 1.93 | 740 | | 3217 | 19 |
| 19 | B | Devon Williams | United States | – | – | xxo | xxo | xxo | xxo | xxx | | | | | | | | | 1.93 | 740 | SB | 3251 | 14 |
| 20 | B | Keisuke Ushiro | Japan | – | – | o | o | xxo | xxx | | | | | | | | | | 1.90 | 714 | | 3016 | 21 |
| 21 | B | Martin Roe | Norway | – | – | o | o | xxx | | | | | | | | | | | 1.87 | 687 | | 3237 | 16 |
| 22 | B | Georni Jaramillo | Venezuela | xxx | | | | | | | | | | | | | | | NM | 0 | | 2631 | 22 |
| | A | Basile Rolnin | France | | | | | | | | | | | | | | | | DNS | | | DNF | |
| | A | Tim Duckworth | Great Britain & N.I. | | | | | | | | | | | | | | | | DNS | | | DNF | |

=== 400 metres ===
The 400 metres event started on 2 October at 18:50.

| Rank | Heat | Athlete | Nationality | Result | Points | Notes | Overall | |
| Rank | Heat | Athlete | Nationality | Result | Points | Notes | Pts | Rank |
|---|---|---|---|---|---|---|---|---|
| 1 | 3 | Pierce LePage | Canada | 47.35 | 941 | PB | 4486 | 2 |
| 2 | 3 | Kai Kazmirek | Germany | 47.35 | 941 | | 4315 | 7 |
| 3 | 3 | Harrison Williams | United States | 47.93 | 913 | | 4130 | 15 |
| 4 | 3 | Vital Zhuk | Belarus | 48.08 | 905 | | 4069 | 17 |
| 5 | 3 | Damian Warner | Canada | 48.12 | 903 | | 4513 | 1 |
| 6 | 3 | Devon Williams | United States | 48.37 | 891 | SB | 4142 | 13 |
| 7 | 3 | Cedric Dubler | Australia | 48.41 | 889 | | 4135 | 14 |
| 8 | 2 | Niklas Kaul | Germany | 48.48 | 886 | SB | 4164 | 11 |
| 9 | 2 | Lindon Victor | Grenada | 48.55 | 883 | SB | 4474 | 4 |
| 10 | 2 | Georni Jaramillo | Venezuela | 48.66 | 877 | SB | 3508 | 21 |
| 11 | 2 | Pieter Braun | Netherlands | 48.79 | 871 | SB | 4251 | 9 |
| 12 | 3 | Kevin Mayer | France | 48.99 | 862 | SB | 4483 | 3 |
| 13 | 1 | Janek Õiglane | Estonia | 49.14 | 855 | PB | 4189 | 10 |
| 14 | 2 | Solomon Simmons | United States | 49.31 | 847 | | 4256 | 8 |
| 15 | 1 | Ilya Shkurenyov | Authorised Neutral Athletes | 49.36 | 844 | SB | 4340 | 5 |
| 16 | 2 | Paweł Wiesiołek | Poland | 49.37 | 844 | | 4150 | 12 |
| 17 | 1 | Tim Nowak | Germany | 49.60 | 833 | SB | 4090 | 16 |
| 18 | 2 | Fredrik Samuelsson | Sweden | 50.08 | 811 | | 4032 | 18 |
| 19 | 1 | Maicel Uibo | Estonia | 50.44 | 794 | SB | 4317 | 6 |
| 20 | 1 | Thomas Van der Plaetsen | Belgium | 50.89 | 774 | | 4007 | 19 |
| 21 | 1 | Keisuke Ushiro | Japan | 51.42 | 750 | SB | 3766 | 20 |
| | 1 | Martin Roe | Norway | DQ | 0 | 163.3(a) | 3237 | 22 |
| | 1 | Basile Rolnin | France | DNS | | | DNF | |
| | 2 | Tim Duckworth | Great Britain & N.I. | DNS | | | DNF | |

=== 110 metres hurdles ===
The 110 metres hurdles event started on 3 October at 16:35.

| Heat | 1 | 2 | 3 |
|---|---|---|---|
| Start time | 16:35 | 16:43 | 16:51 |
| Wind (m/s) | +0.2 | +0.7 | +0.8 |

| Rank | Heat | Athlete | Nationality | Result | Points | Notes | Overall | |
| Rank | Heat | Athlete | Nationality | Result | Points | Notes | Pts | Rank |
|---|---|---|---|---|---|---|---|---|
| 1 | 3 | Damian Warner | Canada | 13.56 | 1032 | | 5545 | 1 |
| 2 | 3 | Kevin Mayer | France | 13.87 | 991 | | 5474 | 2 |
| 3 | 3 | Devon Williams | United States | 13.91 | 986 | | 5128 | 9 |
| 4 | 3 | Solomon Simmons | United States | 14.10 | 962 | | 5218 | 7 |
| 5 | 3 | Cedric Dubler | Australia | 14.13 | 958 | | 5093 | 10 |
| 6 | 3 | Pierce LePage | Canada | 14.19 | 950 | | 5436 | 3 |
| 7 | 3 | Georni Jaramillo | Venezuela | 14.19 | 950 | | 4458 | 20 |
| 8 | 1 | Ilya Shkurenyov | Authorised Neutral Athletes | 14.28 | 939 | SB | 5279 | 5 |
| 9 | 1 | Maicel Uibo | Estonia | 14.43 | 920 | PB | 5237 | 6 |
| 10 | 2 | Harrison Williams | United States | 14.43 | 920 | SB | 5050 | 12 |
| 11 | 2 | Vital Zhuk | Belarus | 14.49 | 912 | SB | 4981 | 16 |
| 12 | 3 | Pieter Braun | Netherlands | 14.59 | 900 | | 5151 | 8 |
| 13 | 1 | Tim Nowak | Germany | 14.60 | 899 | SB | 4989 | 15 |
| 14 | 2 | Niklas Kaul | Germany | 14.64 | 894 | | 5058 | 11 |
| 15 | 2 | Paweł Wiesiołek | Poland | 14.65 | 892 | | 5042 | 13 |
| 16 | 2 | Fredrik Samuelsson | Sweden | 14.78 | 876 | | 4908 | 17 |
| 17 | 1 | Thomas Van der Plaetsen | Belgium | 14.80 | 874 | SB | 4881 | 18 |
| 18 | 1 | Lindon Victor | Grenada | 14.82 | 871 | SB | 5345 | 4 |
| 19 | 2 | Janek Õiglane | Estonia | 15.13 | 834 | | 5023 | 14 |
| 20 | 1 | Keisuke Ushiro | Japan | 15.26 | 818 | | 4584 | 19 |
| 21 | 1 | Martin Roe | Norway | 15.86 | 749 | | 3986 | 22 |
| | 2 | Kai Kazmirek | Germany | DNF | 0 | | 4315 | 21 |

=== Discus throw ===
The discus throw event started on 3 October at 17:30.

| Rank | Group | Name | Nationality | Round | | | Result | Points | Notes | Overall | |
| Rank | Group | Name | Nationality | 1 | 2 | 3 | Result | Points | Notes | Pts | Rank |
|---|---|---|---|---|---|---|---|---|---|---|---|
| 1 | B | Niklas Kaul | Germany | 48.10 | 49.20 | x | 49.20 | 854 | PB | 5912 | 9 |
| 2 | A | Ilya Shkurenyov | Authorised Neutral Athletes | 47.06 | x | 48.75 | 48.75 | 844 | PB | 6123 | 4 |
| 3 | B | Keisuke Ushiro | Japan | 38.88 | 47.44 | 48.41 | 48.41 | 837 | SB | 5421 | 18 |
| 4 | A | Kevin Mayer | France | x | 48.34 | x | 48.34 | 836 | | 6310 | 1 |
| 5 | A | Devon Williams | United States | 45.56 | 44.54 | 47.32 | 47.32 | 815 | | 5943 | 7 |
| 6 | B | Paweł Wiesiołek | Poland | 45.72 | 47.20 | x | 47.20 | 812 | | 5854 | 10 |
| 7 | B | Martin Roe | Norway | 47.06 | x | 47.18 | 47.18 | 812 | | 4798 | 22 |
| 8 | A | Maicel Uibo | Estonia | 46.64 | 45.72 | 45.32 | 46.64 | 801 | SB | 6038 | 5 |
| 9 | B | Vital Zhuk | Belarus | x | 46.64 | x | 46.64 | 801 | | 5782 | 13 |
| 10 | B | Solomon Simmons | United States | 45.25 | 46.26 | x | 46.26 | 793 | SB | 6011 | 6 |
| 11 | A | Thomas Van der Plaetsen | Belgium | x | 44.08 | 46.17 | 46.17 | 791 | | 5672 | 16 |
| 12 | B | Pieter Braun | Netherlands | 45.59 | 43.70 | 44.21 | 45.59 | 779 | | 5930 | 8 |
| 13 | A | Tim Nowak | Germany | 44.52 | 45.02 | x | 45.02 | 767 | | 5756 | 14 |
| 14 | A | Kai Kazmirek | Germany | 44.85 | x | 43.31 | 44.85 | 764 | SB | 5079 | 21 |
| 15 | A | Cedric Dubler | Australia | 41.45 | 41.73 | 44.30 | 44.30 | 752 | PB | 5845 | 11 |
| 16 | A | Harrison Williams | United States | 44.23 | 43.42 | x | 44.23 | 751 | PB | 5801 | 12 |
| 17 | B | Georni Jaramillo | Venezuela | x | 43.04 | 44.00 | 44.00 | 746 | | 5204 | 20 |
| 18 | A | Janek Õiglane | Estonia | x | 43.37 | 41.24 | 43.37 | 733 | | 5756 | 14 |
| 19 | B | Fredrik Samuelsson | Sweden | 40.40 | 42.71 | 41.84 | 42.71 | 720 | | 5628 | 17 |
| 20 | B | Damian Warner | Canada | 38.94 | 42.19 | x | 42.19 | 709 | | 6254 | 2 |
| 21 | A | Pierce LePage | Canada | 41.19 | x | x | 41.19 | 689 | | 6125 | 3 |
| | B | Lindon Victor | Grenada | x | x | x | NM | 0 | | 5345 | 19 |

=== Pole vault ===
The pole vault event started on 3 October at 19:05.

| Rnk | Grp | Athlete | Nationality | 4.40 | 4.50 | 4.60 | 4.70 | 4.80 | 4.90 | 5.00 | 5.10 | 5.20 | 5.30 | 5.40 | 5.50 | Res | Pts | Nts | Overall | |
| Rnk | Grp | Athlete | Nationality | 4.40 | 4.50 | 4.60 | 4.70 | 4.80 | 4.90 | 5.00 | 5.10 | 5.20 | 5.30 | 5.40 | 5.50 | Res | Pts | Nts | Pts | Rnk |
|---|---|---|---|---|---|---|---|---|---|---|---|---|---|---|---|---|---|---|---|---|
| 1 | A | Maicel Uibo | Estonia | – | – | – | – | – | – | o | o | o | xxo | xo | xxx | 5.40 | 1035 | PB | 7073 | 3 |
| 2 | A | Thomas Van der Plaetsen | Belgium | – | – | – | – | – | – | o | – | xxo | o | xxx | | 5.30 | 1004 | | 6676 | 9 |
| 3 | A | Kai Kazmirek | Germany | – | – | – | – | – | o | – | xo | o | xxx | | | 5.20 | 972 | PB | 6051 | 18 |
| 4 | A | Pierce LePage | Canada | – | – | – | – | o | – | o | o | xo | xxx | | | 5.20 | 972 | | 7097 | 1 |
| 5 | A | Ilya Shkurenyov | Authorised Neutral Athletes | – | – | – | – | xo | – | o | xo | xxo | xxx | | | 5.20 | 972 | | 7095 | 2 |
| 6 | B | Niklas Kaul | Germany | – | – | o | o | o | o | o | | | | | | 5.00 | 910 | PB | 6822 | 6 |
| 6 | A | Janek Õiglane | Estonia | – | – | – | – | o | – | o | xxx | | | | | 5.00 | 910 | | 6666 | 10 |
| 8 | A | Tim Nowak | Germany | – | – | – | o | xxo | o | xxx | | | | | | 4.90 | 880 | | 6636 | 13 |
| 9 | B | Paweł Wiesiołek | Poland | – | o | o | o | o | xo | xxx | | | | | | 4.90 | 880 | PB | 6734 | 8 |
| 10 | B | Fredrik Samuelsson | Sweden | – | – | o | o | xo | xxx | | | | | | | 4.80 | 849 | | 6477 | 15 |
| 10 | B | Vital Zhuk | Belarus | o | – | o | o | xo | xxx | | | | | | | 4.80 | 849 | SB | 6631 | 14 |
| 10 | A | Harrison Williams | United States | – | – | – | o | xo | – | xxx | | | | | | 4.80 | 849 | | 6650 | 12 |
| 13 | B | Pieter Braun | Netherlands | – | o | xo | o | xxo | xxx | | | | | | | 4.80 | 849 | | 6779 | 7 |
| 14 | B | Solomon Simmons | United States | xo | – | o | xo | xxo | xxx | | | | | | | 4.80 | 849 | | 6860 | 5 |
| 15 | B | Damian Warner | Canada | – | o | o | xo | xxx | | | | | | | | 4.70 | 819 | | 7073 | 3 |
| 15 | A | Cedric Dubler | Australia | – | – | – | xo | – | xxx | | | | | | | 4.70 | 819 | | 6664 | 11 |
| 17 | B | Martin Roe | Norway | – | xo | xo | xxx | | | | | | | | | 4.60 | 790 | | 5588 | 21 |
| 18 | B | Georni Jaramillo | Venezuela | – | xo | xxx | | | | | | | | | | 4.50 | 760 | | 5935 | 20 |
| 19 | B | Keisuke Ushiro | Japan | o | xxx | | | | | | | | | | | 4.40 | 731 | SB | 6181 | 17 |
| | A | Kevin Mayer | France | – | – | xxr | | | | | | | | | | NM | 0 | | 6310 | 16 |
| | A | Devon Williams | United States | – | xxx | | | | | | | | | | | NM | 0 | | 5943 | 19 |
| | B | Lindon Victor | Grenada | – | – | xxx | | | | | | | | | | NM | 0 | | 5345 | 22 |

=== Javelin throw ===
The javelin throw event started on 3 October at 22:07.

| Rank | Group | Name | Nationality | Round | | | Result | Points | Notes | Overall | |
| Rank | Group | Name | Nationality | 1 | 2 | 3 | Result | Points | Notes | Pts | Rank |
|---|---|---|---|---|---|---|---|---|---|---|---|
| 1 | B | Niklas Kaul | Germany | 75.42 | 79.05 | – | 79.05 | 1028 | CDB | 7850 | 3 |
| 2 | A | Janek Õiglane | Estonia | 72.46 | 69.90 | 70.28 | 72.46 | 927 | PB | 7593 | 6 |
| 3 | A | Maicel Uibo | Estonia | 63.83 | 63.41 | 60.79 | 63.83 | 796 | SB | 7869 | 1 |
| 4 | A | Thomas Van der Plaetsen | Belgium | 62.23 | 61.00 | 63.67 | 63.67 | 793 | SB | 7469 | 9 |
| 5 | B | Damian Warner | Canada | 62.87 | 56.58 | 59.52 | 62.87 | 781 | | 7854 | 2 |
| 6 | B | Keisuke Ushiro | Japan | 61.36 | 60.08 | 60.09 | 61.36 | 758 | | 6939 | 16 |
| 7 | B | Martin Roe | Norway | 59.22 | 58.33 | 60.61 | 60.61 | 747 | | 6335 | 19 |
| 8 | A | Kai Kazmirek | Germany | 60.08 | 58.16 | 58.94 | 60.08 | 739 | SB | 6790 | 17 |
| 9 | B | Pieter Braun | Netherlands | 56.27 | 59.84 | 59.12 | 59.84 | 735 | | 7514 | 7 |
| 10 | A | Ilya Shkurenyov | Authorised Neutral Athletes | 57.38 | 59.56 | 58.64 | 59.56 | 731 | SB | 7826 | 4 |
| 11 | A | Cedric Dubler | Australia | 59.04 | 53.55 | 54.29 | 59.04 | 723 | PB | 7387 | 11 |
| 12 | B | Vital Zhuk | Belarus | 56.84 | 53.08 | 58.66 | 58.66 | 718 | | 7349 | 12 |
| 13 | B | Georni Jaramillo | Venezuela | 57.67 | x | 58.15 | 58.15 | 710 | | 6645 | 18 |
| 14 | A | Pierce LePage | Canada | 57.42 | 55.32 | – | 57.42 | 699 | SB | 7796 | 5 |
| 15 | B | Fredrik Samuelsson | Sweden | 49.34 | 57.39 | 55.35 | 57.39 | 699 | | 7176 | 15 |
| 16 | A | Tim Nowak | Germany | 56.52 | x | 56.76 | 56.76 | 689 | | 7325 | 13 |
| 17 | B | Paweł Wiesiołek | Poland | 53.74 | 55.00 | 54.11 | 55.00 | 663 | | 7397 | 10 |
| 18 | B | Solomon Simmons | United States | x | 53.25 | x | 53.25 | 637 | | 7497 | 8 |
| 19 | A | Harrison Williams | United States | 48.59 | 45.86 | 46.26 | 48.59 | 568 | | 7218 | 14 |
| | A | Kevin Mayer | France | | | | DNS | | | DNF | |
| | A | Devon Williams | United States | | | | DNS | | | DNF | |
| | B | Lindon Victor | Grenada | | | | DNS | | | DNF | |

=== 1500 metres ===
The 1500 metres event started on 4 October at 00:32.

| Rank | Athlete | Nationality | Result | Points | Notes | Overall | |
| Rank | Athlete | Nationality | Result | Points | Notes | Pts | Rank |
|---|---|---|---|---|---|---|---|
| 1 | Niklas Kaul | Germany | 4:15.70 | 841 | SB | 8691 | 1 |
| 2 | Tim Nowak | Germany | 4:22.18 | 797 | | 8122 | 10 |
| 3 | Maicel Uibo | Estonia | 4:31.51 | 735 | SB | 8604 | 2 |
| 4 | Cedric Dubler | Australia | 4:34.75 | 714 | | 8101 | 11 |
| 5 | Vital Zhuk | Belarus | 4:35.45 | 709 | | 8058 | 13 |
| 6 | Pieter Braun | Netherlands | 4:35.62 | 708 | | 8222 | 7 |
| 7 | Janek Õiglane | Estonia | 4:36.24 | 704 | | 8297 | 6 |
| 8 | Fredrik Samuelsson | Sweden | 4:39.48 | 684 | | 7860 | 15 |
| 9 | Damian Warner | Canada | 4:40.77 | 675 | | 8529 | 3 |
| 10 | Harrison Williams | United States | 4:40.96 | 674 | | 7892 | 14 |
| 11 | Ilya Shkurenyov | Authorised Neutral Athletes | 4:41.95 | 668 | SB | 8494 | 4 |
| 12 | Paweł Wiesiołek | Poland | 4:42.06 | 667 | | 8064 | 12 |
| 13 | Thomas Van der Plaetsen | Belgium | 4:43.95 | 656 | | 8125 | 9 |
| 14 | Solomon Simmons | United States | 4:44.17 | 654 | | 8151 | 8 |
| 15 | Pierce LePage | Canada | 4:45.09 | 649 | PB | 8445 | 5 |
| 16 | Kai Kazmirek | Germany | 4:49.16 | 624 | | 7414 | 17 |
| 17 | Keisuke Ushiro | Japan | 4:52.12 | 606 | | 7545 | 16 |
| 18 | Martin Roe | Norway | 5:08.91 | 510 | | 6845 | 18 |
| | Georni Jaramillo | Venezuela | DNF | 0 | | 6645 | 19 |

=== Final standings ===
The final standings were as follows:

The highest mark recorded in each event is highlighted in yellow

| Rank | Athlete | Nationality | 100m | LJ | SP | HJ | 400m | 110mh | DT | PV | JT | 1500m | Total | Notes |
|---|---|---|---|---|---|---|---|---|---|---|---|---|---|---|
| 1st place, gold medalist(s) | Niklas Kaul | Germany | 11.27 | 7.19 | 15.10 | 2.02 | 48.48 | 14.64 | 49.20 | 5.00 | 79.05 | 4:15.70 | 8691 | PB |
| 2nd place, silver medalist(s) | Maicel Uibo | Estonia | 11.10 | 7.46 | 15.12 | 2.17 | 50.44 | 14.43 | 46.64 | 5.40 | 63.83 | 4:31.51 | 8604 | PB |
| 3rd place, bronze medalist(s) | Damian Warner | Canada | 10.35 | 7.67 | 15.17 | 2.02 | 48.12 | 13.56 | 42.19 | 4.70 | 62.87 | 4:40.77 | 8529 | |
| 4 | Ilya Shkurenyov | Authorised Neutral Athletes | 11.02 | 7.61 | 14.71 | 2.11 | 49.36 | 14.28 | 48.75 | 5.20 | 59.56 | 4:41.95 | 8494 | SB |
| 5 | Pierce LePage | Canada | 10.36 | 7.79 | 13.21 | 2.05 | 47.35 | 14.19 | 41.19 | 5.20 | 57.42 | 4:45.09 | 8445 | |
| 6 | Janek Õiglane | Estonia | 10.94 | 7.32 | 15.20 | 1.96 | 49.14 | 15.13 | 43.37 | 5.00 | 72.46 | 4:36.24 | 8297 | SB |
| 7 | Pieter Braun | Netherlands | 11.16 | 7.47 | 15.26 | 2.02 | 48.79 | 14.59 | 45.59 | 4.80 | 59.84 | 4:35.62 | 8222 | |
| 8 | Solomon Simmons | United States | 10.70 | 7.37 | 15.33 | 1.96 | 49.31 | 14.10 | 46.26 | 4.80 | 53.25 | 4:44.17 | 8151 | |
| 9 | Thomas Van der Plaetsen | Belgium | 11.38 | 7.20 | 13.78 | 2.08 | 50.89 | 14.80 | 46.17 | 5.30 | 63.67 | 4:43.95 | 8125 | |
| 10 | Tim Nowak | Germany | 11.12 | 7.07 | 14.69 | 2.02 | 49.60 | 14.60 | 45.02 | 4.90 | 56.76 | 4:22.18 | 8122 | |
| 11 | Cedric Dubler | Australia | 10.75 | 7.25 | 12.43 | 2.02 | 48.41 | 14.13 | 44.30 | 4.70 | 59.04 | 4:34.75 | 8101 | |
| 12 | Paweł Wiesiołek | Poland | 10.76 | 7.02 | 15.26 | 1.96 | 49.37 | 14.65 | 47.20 | 4.90 | 55.00 | 4:42.06 | 8064 | |
| 13 | Vital Zhuk | Belarus | 10.95 | 6.63 | 15.13 | 1.96 | 48.08 | 14.49 | 46.64 | 4.80 | 58.66 | 4:35.45 | 8058 | |
| 14 | Harrison Williams | United States | 10.76 | 7.14 | 13.78 | 1.93 | 47.93 | 14.43 | 44.23 | 4.80 | 48.59 | 4:40.96 | 7892 | |
| 15 | Fredrik Samuelsson | Sweden | 11.13 | 7.11 | 13.97 | 2.02 | 50.08 | 14.78 | 42.71 | 4.80 | 57.39 | 4:39.48 | 7860 | |
| 16 | Keisuke Ushiro | Japan | 11.44 | 6.90 | 14.31 | 1.90 | 51.42 | 15.26 | 48.41 | 4.50 | 61.36 | 4:52.12 | 7545 | |
| 17 | Kai Kazmirek | Germany | 10.82 | 7.26 | 14.30 | 2.05 | 47.35 | DNF | 44.85 | 5.20 | 60.08 | 4:49.16 | 7414 | |
| 18 | Martin Roe | Norway | 10.94 | 7.28 | 15.08 | 1.87 | DQ | 15.86 | 47.18 | 4.60 | 60.61 | 5:08.91 | 6845 | |
| 19 | Georni Jaramillo | Venezuela | 10.88 | 7.47 | 15.42 | NM | 48.66 | 14.19 | 44.00 | 4.40 | 58.15 | DNF | 6645 | |
| | Devon Williams | United States | 10.84 | 7.36 | 13.76 | 1.93 | 48.37 | 13.91 | 47.32 | NM | DNS | – | DNF | |
| | Kevin Mayer | France | 10.50 | 7.56 | 16.82 | 1.99 | 48.99 | 13.87 | 48.34 | NM | DNS | – | DNF | |
| | Lindon Victor | Grenada | 10.66 | 7.51 | 16.24 | 2.05 | 48.55 | 14.82 | NM | NM | DNS | – | DNF | |
| | Basile Rolnin | France | 11.42 | DNS | – | – | – | – | – | – | – | – | DNF | |
| | Tim Duckworth | Great Britain & N.I. | DNS | – | – | – | – | – | – | – | – | – | DNF | |
