= Hungary at the 2007 World Championships in Athletics =

- WA code: HUN

in Osaka
- Competitors: 11 (7 men, 4 women)
- Medals: Gold 0 Silver 0 Bronze 0 Total 0

World Championships in Athletics appearances
- 1976; 1980; 1983; 1987; 1991; 1993; 1995; 1997; 1999; 2001; 2003; 2005; 2007; 2009; 2011; 2013; 2015; 2017; 2019; 2022; 2023; 2025

Hungary will competes at the 2007 World Championships in Athletics with 11 athletes.

== Competitors ==
=== Men ===
50 km walk: Zoltán Czukor
Shot put: Lajos Kürthy
Discus: Zoltán Kővágó, Gábor Máté
Hammer throw: Krisztián Pars
Javelin throw: Csongor Olteán
Decathlon: Attila Zsivoczky

=== Women ===
400 m: Barbara Petráhn
100 m Hurdles: Edit Vári
High jump: Dóra Győrffy
Hammer throw: Katalin Divós
