= Estonia at the 2009 World Championships in Athletics =

- WA code: EST
- National federation: Eesti Kergejõustikuliit
- Website: www.ekjl.ee/uudised

in Berlin
- Competitors: 19 (13 men and 6 women) in 12 events
- Medals Ranked 32nd: Gold 0 Silver 0 Bronze 1 Total 1

World Championships in Athletics appearances (overview)
- 1993; 1995; 1997; 1999; 2001; 2003; 2005; 2007; 2009; 2011; 2013; 2015; 2017; 2019; 2022; 2023

Estonia competed at the 2009 World Championships in Athletics from 15–23 August. A team of 19 athletes was announced in preparation for the competition. Selected athletes have achieved one of the competition's qualifying standards. The team includes reigning Olympic discus throw champion Gerd Kanter and European Indoor champions Mikk Pahapill and Ksenija Balta.

== Medalists ==
Medal	Name	Event
Bronze	Gerd Kanter	Men's discus throw

== Team selection ==
Track and road events

Event	Athletes	
Event	Men	Women
200 metres	Marek Niit	
1500 metres	Tiidrek Nurme	

Field and combined events

Event	Athletes	
Event	Men	Women
High jump		Anna Iljuštšenko
Long jump		Ksenija Balta; Sirkka-Liisa Kivine
Triple jump	Lauri Leis	Kaire Leibak
Shot put	Taavi Peetre	
Discus throw	Gerd Kanter; Aleksander Tammert; Märt Israel	
Javelin throw	Andrus Värnik; Mihkel Kukk; Tanel Laanmäe	Moonika Aava
Heptathlon	—	Kaie Kand
Decathlon	Mikk Pahapill; Andres Raja; Mikk-Mihkel Arro	—

== Results ==
=== Men ===
Track and road events

Event	Athletes	Heat Round 1		Heat Round 2		Semifinal		Final	
Event	Athletes	Result	Rank	Result	Rank	Result	Rank	Result	Rank
200 m	Marek Niit	21.21	39 Q	DNS		Did not advance			
1500 m	Tiidrek Nurme	3:43.73 SB	28	Did not advance					

Field events

Event	Athletes	Qualification		Final	
Event	Athletes	Result	Rank	Result	Rank
Triple jump	Lauri Leis	15.98	38	Did not advance	
Shot put	Taavi Peetre	19.91	15	Did not advance	
Discus throw	Gerd Kanter	66.73	2 Q	66.88	Bronze medal
Discus throw	Aleksander Tammert	62.24	13	Did not advance	
Discus throw	Märt Israel	59.58	22	Did not advance	
Javelin throw	Andrus Värnik	DNS			
Javelin throw	Mihkel Kukk	78.18	16	Did not advance	
Javelin throw	Tanel Laanmäe	NM	—	Did not advance	
Decathlon	Mikk Pahapill			DNF	
Decathlon	Andres Raja			8119	15
Decathlon	Mikk-Mihkel Arro			7528	33

=== Women ===
Field and combined events

Event	Athletes	Qualification		Final	
Event	Athletes	Result	Rank	Result	Rank
Long jump	Ksenija Balta	6.59	8 Q	6.62	8
Long jump	Sirkka-Liisa Kivine	6.10	33	Did not advance	
Triple jump	Kaire Leibak	DNS			
High jump	Anna Iljuštšenko	1.89	17	Did not advance	
Javelin throw	Moonika Aava	53.86	26	Did not advance	
Heptathlon	Kaie Kand			5,760	18
