= Devon Williams (decathlete) =

American decathlete

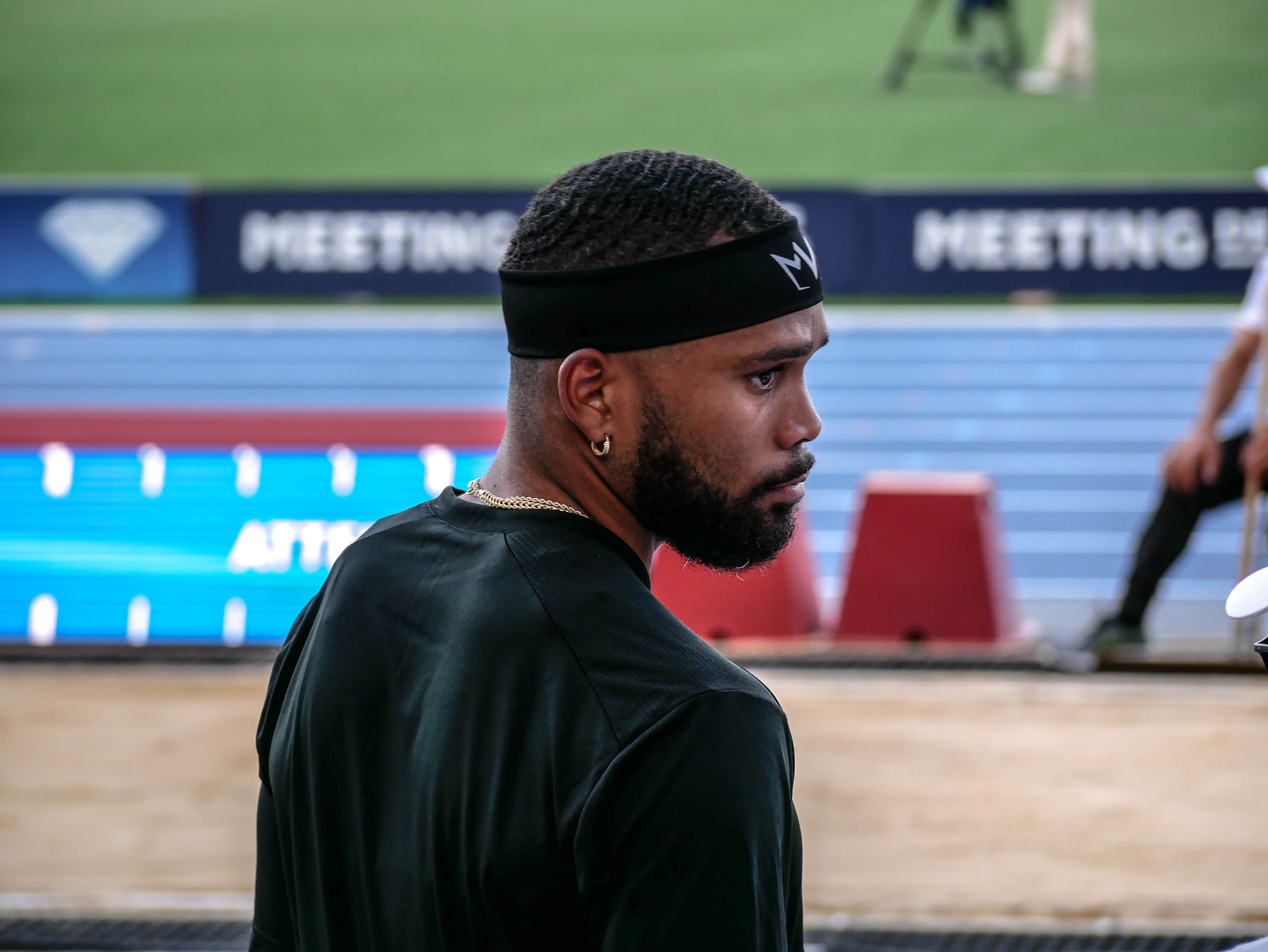
- Williams in 2019

Personal information
- Born: January 17, 1994 (age 31) Marietta, Georgia, U.S.
- Education: University of Georgia
- Height: 6 ft 3 in (191 cm)

Sport
- Sport: Track and field
- Event: Decathlon
- Coached by: Petros Kyprianou

Devon Williams (born January 17, 1994, in Marietta, Georgia) is an American athlete competing in the decathlon. He represented his country at the 2017 World Championships in London, where he finished 10th. His sister is fellow American track and field athlete Kendell Williams.

His main personal bests are 8345 points in the decathlon (Athens 2017) and 6177 points in the indoor heptathlon (Gilliam, TX 2017).

== Competition record ==
Year	Competition	Venue	Position	Event	Notes
Representing the United States
2017	World Championships	London, United Kingdom	10th	Decathlon	8088 pts
2019	World Championships	Doha, Qatar	–	Decathlon	DNF

== Personal bests ==
Outdoor
- 100 metres – 10.65 (-0.1 m/s) (Eugene 2017)
- 400 metres – 48.11 (London 2017)
- 1500 metres – 4:33.15 (Tuscaloosa 2016)
- 110 metres hurdles – 13.37 (+0.2 m/s) (Columbia 2017)
- High jump – 1.98 (Eugene 2017)
- Pole vault – 5.00 (Des Moines 2019)
- Long jump – 7.75 (+0.0 m/s) (Athens 2017)
- Shot put – 14.43 (London 2017)
- Discus throw – 49.47 (Des Moines 2019)
- Javelin throw – 60.74 (Des Moines 2019)
- Decathlon – 8345 (Athens 2017)
Indoor
- 60 metres – 6.80 (Nashville 2017)
- 1000 metres – 2:38.59 (Lexington, VA 2018)
- 60 metres hurdles – 7.75 (Gilliam, TX 2017)
- High jump – 1.97 (College Station, TX 2018)
- Pole vault – 4.80 (Nashville 2017)
- Long jump – 7.83 (Gilliam, TX 2017))
- Shot put – 14.51 (Nashville 2017)
- Heptathlon – 6177 (Gilliam, TX 2017)
