= Estonia at the 2023 World Athletics Championships =

- Flag of Estonia
- WA code: EST

in Budapest, Hungary 19 August 2023 – 27 August 2023
- Competitors: 7 (5 men and 2 women)
- Medals: Gold 0 Silver 0 Bronze 0 Total 0

World Athletics Championships appearances (overview)
- 1993; 1995; 1997; 1999; 2001; 2003; 2005; 2007; 2009; 2011; 2013; 2015; 2017; 2019; 2022; 2023

Estonia competed at the 2023 World Athletics Championships in Budapest, Hungary, from 19 to 27 August 2023.

== Results ==
Estonia entered 7 athletes.

Key

- Q = Qualified for the next round
- q = Qualified for the next round as a fastest loser or, in field events, by position without achieving the qualifying target
- NR = National record
- PB = Personal best
- SB = Season best
- N/A = Round not applicable for the event

=== Men ===
Track and road events

Athlete	Event	Heat		Semifinal		Final	
Athlete	Event	Result	Rank	Result	Rank	Result	Rank
Rasmus Mägi	400 metres hurdles	48.58	2 Q	48.30	2 Q	48.33	7
Tiidrek Nurme	Marathon	—				2:15:42	31

Combined events – Decathlon

Athlete	Event	100 m	LJ	SP	HJ	400 m	110H	DT	PV	JT	1500 m	Final	Rank
Johannes Erm	Result	10.69 PB	7.72 SB	15.38 PB	1.93	47.05	14.90 SB	45.09	4.90	60.56 PB	4:22.19 PB	8484 PB	9
Johannes Erm	Points	931	990	813	740	956	862	769	880	746	797	8484 PB	9
Janek Õiglane	Result	10.94 SB	7.47 PB	15.08 SB	2.02 SB	48.41 PB	14.51	40.85 SB	5.10 SB	70.45 SB	4:23.43 PB	8524 PB	6
Janek Õiglane	Points	874	927	795	822	889	910	682	941	896	788	8524 PB	6
Karel Tilga	Result	10.84 PB	7.58	15.75	2.05	48.58	14.68	50.57	4.80 SB	66.42 SB	4:20.73 PB	8681 PB	4
Karel Tilga	Points	897	955	836	850	881	889	882	849	835	807	8681 PB	4

=== Women ===
Field events

Athlete	Event	Qualification		Final	
Athlete	Event	Distance	Position	Distance	Position
Elisabeth Pihela	High jump	1.89	16	Did not advance	
Gedly Tugi	Javelin throw	NM		Did not advance	
