= Solomon Simmons =

American decathlete

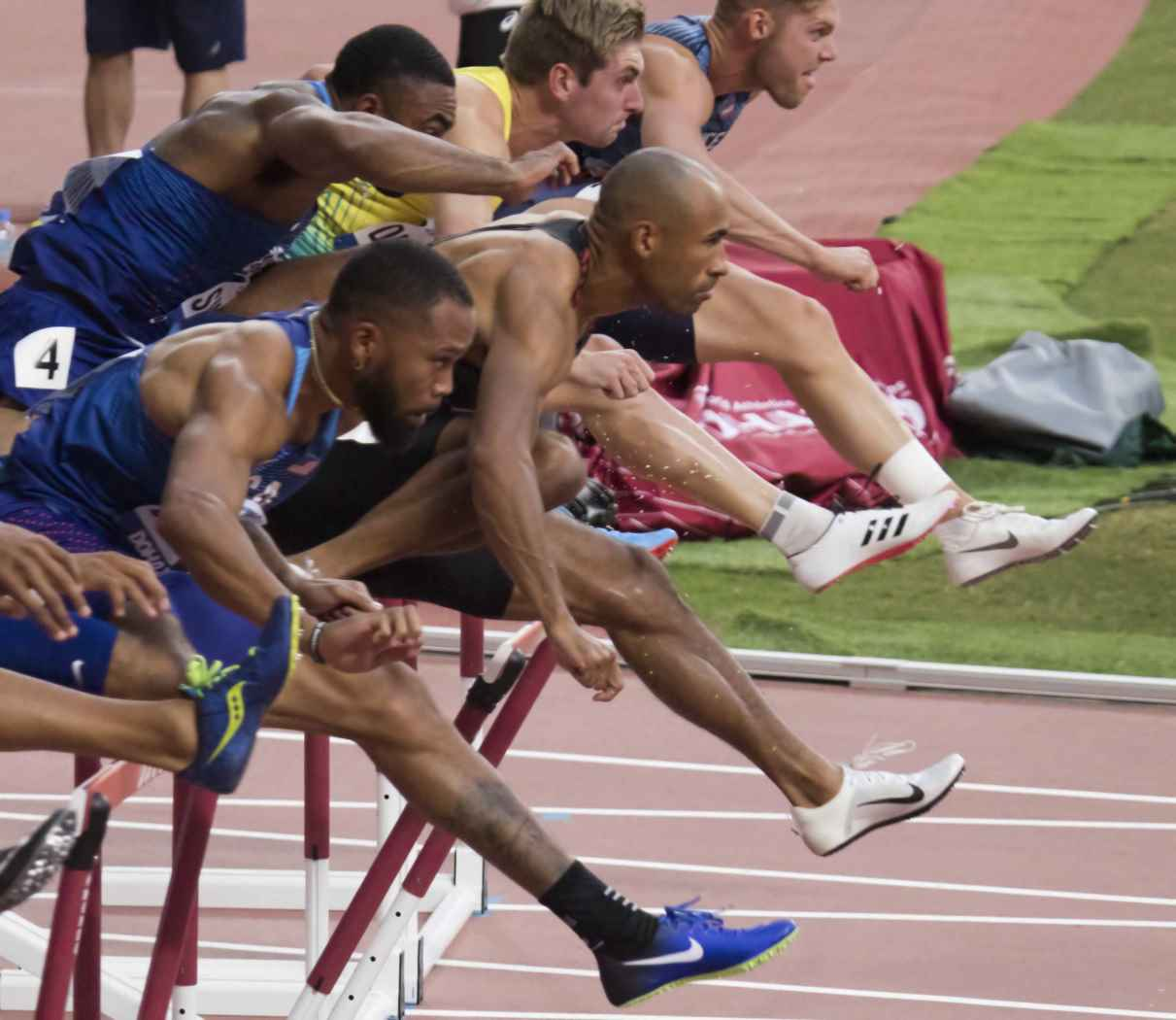
Solomon Simmons starts over the hurdles in the 2018 World Championships in Doha, Qatar

Solomon Simmons (born September 26, 1993) is an American athlete, specializing in decathlon.

Simmons attended Eastern Michigan University from 2011 to 2016 where he was a two time Mid American Conference Champion in the decathlon and heptathlon. Simmons finished his collegiate career with a 6th-place finish at the 2016 Olympic Trials.

After finishing second at 2018 USA Track & Field Outdoor Championships, he confirmed this second, with a personal best of 8,227 points, at the 2019 US Championships in Des Moines, qualifying for 2019 World Championships in Doha.

He has been married twice.
