= Karl Robert Saluri =

Estonian decathlete

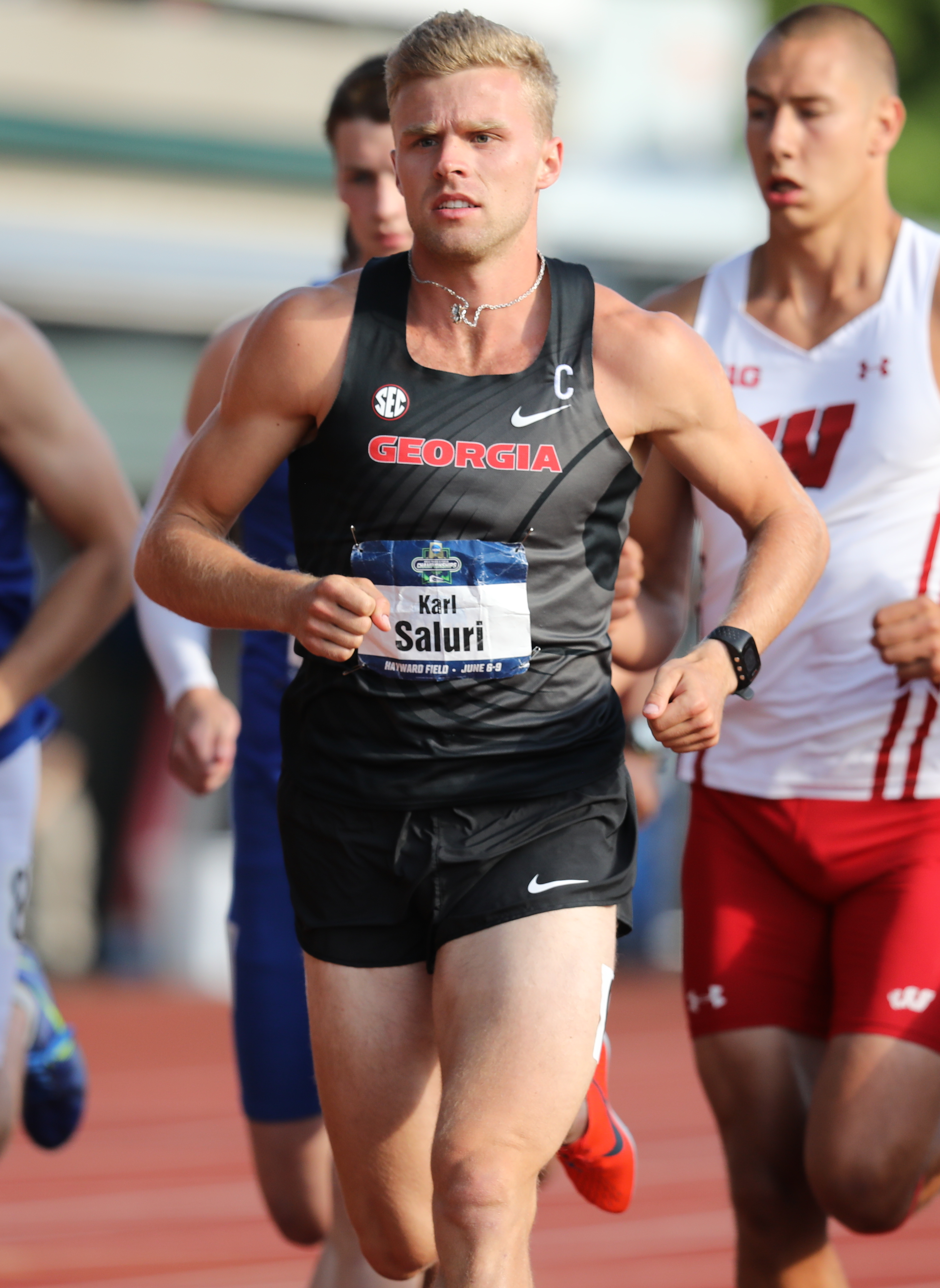
- Saluri at the 2018 NCAA Division I Outdoor Track and Field Championships

Personal information
- Born: August 6, 1993 (age 32)
- Education: University of Georgia
- Height: 1.78 m (5 ft 10 in)
- Weight: 75 kg (165 lb)

Sport
- Country: Estonia
- Sport: Athletics
- Event: Decathlon
- University team: Georgia Bulldogs
- Coached by: Petros Kyprianou

Achievements and titles
- Personal best(s): Decathlon: 8137; Heptathlon: 6051
- Updated on 25 February 2020

Karl Robert Saluri (born August 6, 1993 in Kuimetsa, Rapla County) is a former Estonian decathlete.

In April 2016 Saluri earned a personal record score of 8108, enough to pass the qualifying mark for the 2016 Olympics of 8100. This result beat his previous personal record by 637 points. Additionally, this result made him the European leader up to that point of the year and earned him honors as the European Athlete of the Month for April, 2016.

In May 2020 he announced his retirement from competitive sports.

In December 2021, Saluri became the coach of Estonian decathlete Karel Tilga and Chinese heptathlete Zheng Ninali. By April 2022, the athletes were no longer working with Saluri.

== International competitions ==
Year	Competition	Venue	Position	Event	Result
Representing Estonia
2011	European Junior Championships	Tallinn, Estonia	8th	Decathlon (junior)	7453 pts
2012	World Junior Championships	Barcelona, Spain	5th	Decathlon (junior)	7583 pts
2016	Olympic Games	Rio de Janeiro, Brazil	23rd	Decathlon	7223 pts
2017	World Championships	London, United Kingdom	13th	Decathlon	8025 pts
2018	European Championships	Berlin, Germany	–	Decathlon	DNF
2019	European Indoor Championships	Glasgow, United Kingdom	–	Heptathlon	DNF
