= Maicel Uibo =

Estonian decathlete

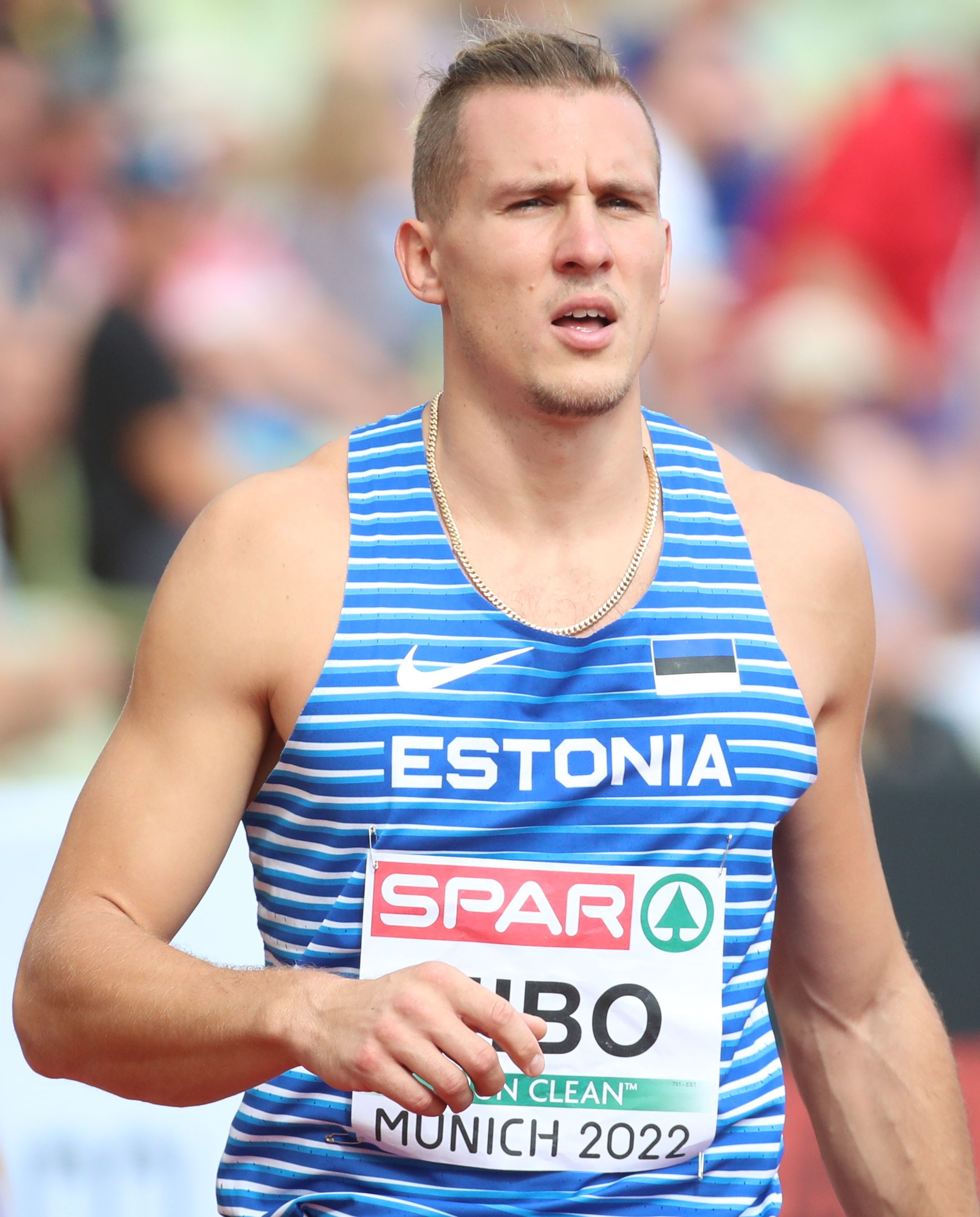
- Uibo in 2022

Personal information
- Nationality: Estonian
- Born: 27 December 1992 (age 33) Põlva, Estonia
- Education: University of Georgia
- Height: 1.88 m (6 ft 2 in)
- Weight: 84 kg (185 lb)
- Spouse: Shaunae Miller-Uibo (married 2017)

Sport
- Country: Estonia
- Sport: Athletics
- Events: Decathlon, Heptathlon
- Coached by: Petros Kyprianou

Achievements and titles
- Personal bests: Decathlon: 8,604 (2019); Heptathlon: 6,265 (2018)
Medal record
World Championships
Silver medal – second place	2019 Doha	Decathlon
World Indoor Championships
Bronze medal – third place	2018 Birmingham	Heptathlon

Maicel Uibo (born 27 December 1992) is an Estonian decathlete. While competing for the University of Georgia, he won the 2014 and 2015 NCAA championships in decathlon. Uibo won the silver medal at the 2019 World Championships, setting his personal best in the event with 8604 points.

== International competitions ==
Year	Competition	Venue	Position	Event	Result
Representing Estonia
2013	European U23 Championships	Tampere	21st (q)	Long jump	7.24 m
2013	World Championships	Moscow	19th	Decathlon	7850 pts
2015	World Championships	Beijing	10th	Decathlon	8245 pts
2016	Olympic Games	Rio	24th	Decathlon	7170 pts
2017	European Indoor Championships	Belgrade	–	Heptathlon	DNF
2017	World Championships	London	–	Decathlon	DNF
2018	World Indoor Championships	Birmingham	3rd	Heptathlon	6265 pts (PB)
2018	European Championships	Berlin	–	Decathlon	DNF
2019	World Championships	Doha	2nd	Decathlon	8604 pts (PB)
2021	Olympic Games	Tokyo	15th	Decathlon	8037 pts
2022	World Championships	Eugene	7th	Decathlon	8425 pts
2022	European Championships	Munich	5th	Decathlon	8234 pts
2023	European Indoor Championships	Istanbul	–	Heptathlon	DNF

== Personal bests ==
Information from World Athletics profile unless otherwise noted.

=== Outdoor ===
As of 18 June 2025

Event	Performance	Location	Date	Points
Decathlon	—N/a	Doha	3–4 October 2019	8,604 points
100 metres	10.99 (+1.8 m/s)	Athens, Georgia	11 April 2013	863 points
Long jump	7.82 m (25 ft 7 3/4 in) (-1.2 m/s)	Athens, Georgia	11 April 2013	1,015 points
Shot put	15.17 m (49 ft 9 in)	Eugene	23 July 2022	800 points
High jump	2.18 m (7 ft 1 3/4 in)	Starkville	14 May 2015	973 points
400 metres	50.18	Berlin	7 August 2018	806 points
110 metres hurdles	14.43 (+0.2 m/s)	Doha	4 October 2019	920 points
Discus throw	49.14 m (161 ft 2 1/2 in)	Athens, Georgia	12 April 2013	852 points
Pole vault	5.50 m (18 ft 1/2 in)	Tokyo	5 August 2021	1,067 points
Javelin throw	65.80 m (215 ft 10 1/2 in)	Götzis	30 May 2021	825 points
1500 metres	4:25.53	Beijing	29 August 2015	774 points
Virtual Best Performance				8,895 points

=== Indoor ===
As of 18 June 2025

Event	Performance	Location	Date	Points
Heptathlon	—N/a	Birmingham	2–3 March 2018	6,265 points
60 metres	7.16	Albuquerque	14 March 2014	826 points
Long jump	7.37 m (24 ft 2 in)	Albuquerque	14 March 2014	903 points
Shot put	14.87 m (48 ft 9 1/4 in)	Tallinn	4 February 2023	782 points
High jump	2.19 m (7 ft 2 in)	Tallinn	4 February 2023	982 points
60 metres hurdles	8.19	Birmingham	3 March 2018	935 points
Pole vault	5.35 m (17 ft 6 1/2 in)	Ourense	26 February 2022	1,020 points
1000 metres	2:38.51	Birmingham	3 March 2018	890 points
Virtual Best Performance				6,338 points

== Personal life ==
Uibo married his college sweetheart, Bahamian track star and two-time Olympic 400 meter champion, Shaunae Miller in 2017.
