= Estonian Athletic Association =

Sports governing body in Estonia

- Eesti Kergejõustikuliit
- Sport: Athletics
- Abbreviation: EKJL
- Founded: 1920
- Affiliation: World Athletics
- Regional affiliation: EAA
- Headquarters: Tallinn, Estonia
- President: Erich Teigamägi
- Secretary: Sirje Lippe

Official website
- www.ekjl.ee
- (Estonia)

The Estonian Athletic Association (Estonian: Eesti Kergejõustikuliit) is the governing body for the sport of athletics in Estonia.

== Affiliations ==
- World Athletics
- European Athletic Association (EAA)
- Estonian Olympic Committee

== National records ==
EKJL maintains the Estonian records in athletics.

== See also ==
- Estonian Championships in Athletics
