= Athletics at the 2015 Summer Universiade – Men's decathlon =

The men's decathlon event at the 2015 Summer Universiade was held on 8 and 9 July.

== Medalists ==
Gold	Silver	Bronze
Thomas Van Der Plaetsen; Belgium	Bastien Auzeil; France	Rene Stauss; Germany

== Results ==
=== 100 metres ===
Wind:
Heat 1: 0.0 m/s, Heat 2: +0.6 m/s, Heat 3: +1.0 m/s

Rank	Heat	Name	Nationality	Time	Points	Notes
1	3	James Turner	Canada	10.86	892	
2	3	Jérémy Lelievre	France	10.96	870	
3	1	Steele Wasik	United States	11.06	847	
4	2	Dominik Siedlaczek	Austria	11.09	841	
5	3	Rene Stauss	Germany	11.11	836	
6	3	David Brock	Australia	11.17	823	
7	1	Chen Xianbiao	China	11.18	821	
7	3	Henrik Holmberg	Norway	11.18	821	
9	3	Aaron Booth	New Zealand	11.26	804	
10	1	Pavel Rudnyev	Russia	11.27	801	
11	1	Fredriech Pretorius	South Africa	11.28	799	
12	1	Kyle Cranston	Australia	11.29	797	
12	2	Carlos Burlando	Venezuela	11.29	797	
14	1	Bastien Auzeil	France	11.33	789	
14	2	Bae Sang-hwa	South Korea	11.33	789	
16	2	Thomas Van Der Plaetsen	Belgium	11.34	786	
17	2	Jackson Henry	New Zealand	11.47	759	
	2	Darko Pešić	Montenegro	DNS	0	

=== Long jump ===
Rank	Group	Athlete	Nationality	#1	#2	#3	Result	Points	Notes	Total
1	B	James Turner	Canada	6.93	7.15	x	7.15	850		1742
2	A	Jérémy Lelievre	France	7.10	x	x	7.10	838		1708
3	B	Thomas Van Der Plaetsen	Belgium	x	x	7.08	7.08	833		1619
4	B	Bastien Auzeil	France	6.92	6.95	7.02	7.02	818		1607
5	A	Carlos Burlando	Venezuela	6.53	6.77	6.93	6.93	797		1594
6	B	David Brock	Australia	6.53	6.82	6.90	6.90	790		1613
7	A	Fredriech Pretorius	South Africa	6.83	6.75	6.56	6.83	774		1573
8	B	Jackson Henry	New Zealand	6.82	6.61	x	6.82	771		1530
9	A	Dominik Siedlaczek	Austria	6.65	6.77	6.81	6.81	769		1610
10	A	Pavel Rudnyev	Russia	6.80	x	–	6.80	767		1568
11	B	Steele Wasik	United States	6.62	6.67	6.77	6.77	760		1607
12	B	Rene Stauss	Germany	6.73	6.57	6.76	6.76	757		1593
13	B	Henrik Holmberg	Norway	6.75	6.61	x	6.75	755		1576
14	A	Bae Sang-hwa	South Korea	6.69	6.69	6.64	6.69	741		1530
15	A	Chen Xianbiao	China	6.54	6.53	6.66	6.66	734		1555
16	A	Kyle Cranston	Australia	6.60	6.61	6.63	6.63	727		1524
17	A	Aaron Booth	New Zealand	6.26	6.38	6.07	6.38	670		1474

=== Shot put ===
Rank	Group	Athlete	Nationality	#1	#2	#3	Result	Points	Notes	Total
1	A	Jérémy Lelievre	France	14.89	15.21	x	15.21	803		2511
2	B	Bastien Auzeil	France	14.72	14.97	15.09	15.09	795		2402
3	B	Rene Stauss	Germany	14.67	x	x	14.67	769		2362
4	B	Thomas Van Der Plaetsen	Belgium	12.01	11.66	13.75	13.75	713		2332
5	A	David Brock	Australia	13.43	13.47	13.43	13.47	696		2309
6	B	Kyle Cranston	Australia	13.44	13.42	13.33	13.44	694		2218
7	A	James Turner	Canada	x	13.41	13.38	13.41	692		2434
8	B	Bae Sang-hwa	South Korea	12.46	13.26	12.81	13.26	683		2213
9	B	Aaron Booth	New Zealand	12.66	12.55	13.21	13.21	680		2154
10	B	Steele Wasik	United States	12.75	12.88	13.13	13.13	675		2282
11	A	Dominik Siedlaczek	Austria	12.78	12.80	12.93	12.93	663		2273
12	A	Henrik Holmberg	Norway	12.56	12.89	11.97	12.89	661		2237
13	A	Fredriech Pretorius	South Africa	11.59	12.84	12.77	12.84	657		2230
14	A	Jackson Henry	New Zealand	12.22	12.54	12.11	12.54	639		2169
15	A	Pavel Rudnyev	Russia	12.03	–	–	12.03	608		2176
16	B	Carlos Burlando	Venezuela	11.13	x	11.40	11.40	570		2164
17	B	Chen Xianbiao	China	9.70	10.21	10.41	10.41	510		2065

=== High jump ===
Rank	Group	Athlete	Nationality	1.71	1.74	1.77	1.80	1.83	1.86	1.89	1.92	1.95	1.98	2.01	2.04	2.07	2.10	2.13	2.16	Result	Points	Notes	Total
1	A	Rene Stauss	Germany	–	–	–	–	–	–	–	o	–	o	xo	xxo	o	o	xo	xxx	2.13	925		3287
2	A	Thomas Van Der Plaetsen	Belgium	–	–	–	–	–	–	–	–	o	–	o	xxo	o	xo	xxx		2.10	896		3228
3	A	Henrik Holmberg	Norway	–	–	–	–	–	–	o	–	o	–	o	xo	xx–	x			2.04	840		3077
4	B	Steele Wasik	United States	–	–	–	–	o	o	o	xo	o	xxo	xo	xxo	xxx				2.04	840		3122
5	A	Bastien Auzeil	France	–	–	–	–	–	–	o	xo	o	xxx							1.95	758		3160
5	A	Fredriech Pretorius	South Africa	–	–	–	o	–	xo	o	o	o	xxx							1.95	758		2988
7	B	Kyle Cranston	Australia	–	–	–	xo	o	xo	o	xo	xo	xxx							1.95	758		2976
8	A	David Brock	Australia	–	–	–	–	–	o	–	o	xxx								1.92	731		3040
9	B	Bae Sang-hwa	South Korea	–	–	–	–	o	–	xxo	o	xxx								1.92	731		2944
10	A	Dominik Siedlaczek	Austria	–	–	–	–	o	o	–	xo	xxx								1.92	731		3004
11	B	Aaron Booth	New Zealand	–	–	o	–	o	–	o	r									1.89	705		2859
12	A	Chen Xianbiao	China	–	–	–	o	o	o	xxo	xxx									1.89	705		2770
13	B	Carlos Burlando	Venezuela	–	–	–	o	o	o	xxx										1.86	679		2843
14	A	Jackson Henry	New Zealand	–	–	o	o	–	xo	xxx										1.86	679		2848
15	B	Jérémy Lelievre	France	–	–	–	o	o	xxx											1.83	653		3164
16	B	James Turner	Canada	–	o	o	o	xxx												1.80	627		3061
17	B	Pavel Rudnyev	Russia	o	r															1.71	552		2728

=== 400 metres ===
Rank	Heat	Name	Nationality	Time	Points	Notes	Total
1	1	Carlos Burlando	Venezuela	49.50	838		3864
2	2	Jérémy Lelievre	France	49.72	828		3992
3	3	Steele Wasik	United States	49.92	818		3940
4	2	James Turner	Canada	50.07	811		3872
5	1	Dominik Siedlaczek	Austria	50.10	810		3814
6	2	Rene Stauss	Germany	50.17	807		4094
7	1	Thomas Van Der Plaetsen	Belgium	50.42	795		4023
8	3	Bastien Auzeil	France	50.64	785		3945
9	2	Henrik Holmberg	Norway	50.73	781		3858
10	2	Aaron Booth	New Zealand	50.86	775		3634
11	1	Jackson Henry	New Zealand	50.90	774		3622
11	3	Fredriech Pretorius	South Africa	50.90	774		3762
13	3	Kyle Cranston	Australia	51.20	760		3736
14	2	David Brock	Australia	51.22	759		3799
15	1	Bae Sang-hwa	South Korea	51.56	744		3688
16	3	Chen Xianbiao	China	51.97	726		3496
	3	Pavel Rudnyev	Russia	DNS	0		DNF

=== 110 metres hurdles ===
Wind:
Heat 1: -0.4 m/s, Heat 2: +0.8 m/s, Heat 3: +1.4 m/s

Rank	Lane	Name	Nationality	Time	Points	Notes	Total
1	3	Dominik Siedlaczek	Austria	14.33	932		4746
2	3	Bastien Auzeil	France	14.42	921		4866
3	3	Thomas Van Der Plaetsen	Belgium	14.59	900		4923
4	3	Steele Wasik	United States	14.62	896		4836
5	2	Jackson Henry	New Zealand	14.70	886		4508
6	2	Jérémy Lelievre	France	14.78	876		4868
7	3	Bae Sang-hwa	South Korea	14.84	869		4557
8	2	Chen Xianbiao	China	15.01	848		4344
9	2	James Turner	Canada	15.07	841		4713
10	1	Henrik Holmberg	Norway	15.19	827		4685
11	3	Fredriech Pretorius	South Africa	15.22	823		4585
12	2	Kyle Cranston	Australia	15.32	811		4547
13	1	Rene Stauss	Germany	15.69	768		4862
14	1	David Brock	Australia	15.97	736		4535
15	1	Carlos Burlando	Venezuela	16.05	727		4408
16	1	Aaron Booth	New Zealand	16.34	695		4329

=== Discus throw ===
Rank	Group	Athlete	Nationality	#1	#2	#3	Result	Points	Notes	Total
1	A	Rene Stauss	Germany	41.92	44.63	45.00	45.00	767		5629
2	A	Bastien Auzeil	France	41.36	x	43.20	43.20	730		5596
3	A	Thomas Van Der Plaetsen	Belgium	39.99	39.64	41.85	41.85	702		5625
4	A	Chen Xianbiao	China	x	33.58	41.13	41.13	688		5032
5	A	James Turner	Canada	40.39	37.73	41.02	41.02	685		5398
6	A	Jérémy Lelievre	France	x	40.83	x	40.83	681		5549
7	B	Steele Wasik	United States	33.66	36.57	40.00	40.00	665		5501
8	B	Henrik Holmberg	Norway	33.87	39.22	39.93	39.93	663		5348
9	A	David Brock	Australia	39.63	38.06	38.58	39.63	657		5192
10	B	Aaron Booth	New Zealand	39.08	x	37.52	39.08	646		4975
11	B	Dominik Siedlaczek	Austria	x	37.17	38.44	38.44	633		5379
12	A	Kyle Cranston	Australia	33.10	37.49	37.24	37.49	614		5161
13	B	Bae Sang-hwa	South Korea	x	37.42	36.52	37.42	612		5169
14	B	Fredriech Pretorius	South Africa	x	35.29	x	35.29	569		5154
15	B	Carlos Burlando	Venezuela	30.40	29.99	35.23	35.23	568		4976
16	B	Jackson Henry	New Zealand	33.56	34.48	28.77	34.48	553		5061

=== Pole vault ===
Rank	Group	Athlete	Nationality	3.50	3.60	3.70	3.80	4.00	4.10	4.20	4.30	4.40	4.50	4.60	4.70	4.80	5.00	5.10	5.20	5.30	Result	Points	Notes	Total
1	A	Thomas Van Der Plaetsen	Belgium	–	–	–	–	–	–	–	–	–	–	–	–	–	o	–	o	xxx	5.20	972		6597
2	A	Bastien Auzeil	France	–	–	–	–	–	–	–	–	–	–	–	–	o	o	o	xxx		5.10	941		6537
3	A	Rene Stauss	Germany	–	–	–	–	–	–	o	–	o	o	o	xxo	xxx					4.70	819		6448
3	B	David Brock	Australia	–	–	–	–	–	–	–	o	–	o	–	xxo	xxx					4.70	819		6011
5	A	Jérémy Lelievre	France	–	–	–	–	–	–	–	o	o	o	xxx							4.50	760		6309
6	A	Chen Xianbiao	China	–	–	–	–	–	–	o	–	o	xo	xxx							4.50	760		5792
7	B	Kyle Cranston	Australia	–	–	–	–	–	–	–	o	o	xxo	xxx							4.50	760		5921
7	A	Bae Sang-hwa	South Korea	–	–	–	–	–	–	o	–	xo	xxx								4.40	731		5900
7	A	Fredriech Pretorius	South Africa	–	–	–	–	–	–	o	–	xo	xxx								4.40	731		5885
9	B	James Turner	Canada	–	–	–	–	o	xo	o	xxo	xxo	xxx								4.40	731		6129
10	B	Dominik Siedlaczek	Austria	–	–	–	–	o	–	o	o	xxx									4.30	702		6081
11	B	Steele Wasik	United States	–	–	–	o	xxo	o	–	xxx										4.10	645		6146
12	B	Henrik Holmberg	Norway	o	–	xo	xxo	xxo	xxx												4.00	617		5965
13	B	Aaron Booth	New Zealand	–	o	–	o	xxx													3.80	562		5537
	B	Carlos Burlando	Venezuela	xxx																	NM	0		4976
	B	Jackson Henry	New Zealand	–	xxx																NM	0		5061

=== Javelin throw ===
Rank	Athlete	Nationality	#1	#2	#3	Result	Points	Notes	Total
1	Kyle Cranston	Australia	59.05	60.69	x	60.69	748		6669
2	Bastien Auzeil	France	56.27	60.55	59.67	60.55	746		7283
3	Thomas Van Der Plaetsen	Belgium	56.09	60.00	x	60.00	738		7335
4	Aaron Booth	New Zealand	55.88	57.84	57.23	57.84	705		6242
5	James Turner	Canada	53.12	57.59	56.71	57.59	702		6831
6	Rene Stauss	Germany	52.20	56.61	54.25	56.61	687		7135
7	Fredriech Pretorius	South Africa	55.67	x	56.47	56.47	685		6570
8	Carlos Burlando	Venezuela	55.76	53.76	53.30	55.76	674		5650
9	Bae Sang-hwa	South Korea	52.83	51.10	55.46	55.46	670		6570
10	David Brock	Australia	52.57	55.11	55.33	55.33	668		6679
11	Steele Wasik	United States	52.13	48.90	54.02	54.02	648		6794
12	Henrik Holmberg	Norway	44.91	44.80	52.29	52.29	623		6588
13	Jérémy Lelievre	France	49.76	x	x	49.76	585		6894
14	Dominik Siedlaczek	Austria	44.73	45.68	43.67	45.68	525		6606
15	Chen Xianbiao	China	44.28	42.06	44.61	44.61	509		6301
	Jackson Henry	New Zealand				DNS	0		DNF

=== 1500 metres ===
Official Video

Rank	Name	Nationality	Time	Points	Notes
1	Jérémy Lelievre	France	4:37.12	699	
2	James Turner	Canada	4:37.16	698	
3	Bae Sang-hwa	South Korea	4:38.01	693	
4	Dominik Siedlaczek	Austria	4:40.75	676	
5	Aaron Booth	New Zealand	4:42.78	663	
6	Carlos Burlando	Venezuela	4:43.43	659	
7	David Brock	Australia	4:43.59	658	
8	Rene Stauss	Germany	4:43.89	656	
9	Bastien Auzeil	France	4:48.17	630	
10	Kyle Cranston	Australia	4:48.75	626	
11	Steele Wasik	United States	4:49.77	620	
12	Thomas Van Der Plaetsen	Belgium	4:50.21	617	
13	Fredriech Pretorius	South Africa	4:52.45	604	
14	Henrik Holmberg	Norway	4:55.69	585	
15	Chen Xianbiao	China	5:12.53	490	

=== Final standings ===
The highest mark recorded in each event is highlighted in yellow

Rank	Athlete	Nationality	100m	LJ	SP	HJ	400m	110m H	DT	PV	JT	1500m	Points	Notes
1st place, gold medalist(s)	Thomas Van Der Plaetsen	Belgium	11.34	7.08	13.75	2.10	50.42	14.59	41.85	5.20	60.00	4:50.21	7952	
2nd place, silver medalist(s)	Bastien Auzeil	France	11.33	7.02	15.09	1.95	50.64	14.42	43.20	5.10	60.55	4:48.17	7913	
3rd place, bronze medalist(s)	Rene Stauss	Germany	11.11	6.76	14.67	2.13	50.17	15.69	45.00	4.70	56.61	4:43.89	7791	
4	Jérémy Lelievre	France	10.96	7.10	15.21	1.83	49.72	14.78	40.83	4.50	49.76	4:37.12	7593	
5	James Turner	Canada	10.86	7.15	13.41	1.80	50.07	15.07	41.02	4.40	57.59	4:37.16	7529	
6	Steele Wasik	United States	11.06	6.77	13.13	2.04	49.92	14.62	40.00	4.10	54.02	4:49.77	7414	
7	David Brock	Australia	11.17	6.90	13.47	1.92	51.22	15.97	39.63	4.70	55.33	4:43.59	7337	
8	Kyle Cranston	Australia	11.29	6.63	13.44	1.95	51.20	15.32	37.49	4.50	60.69	4:48.75	7295	
9	Dominik Siedlaczek	Austria	11.09	6.81	12.93	1.92	50.10	14.33	38.44	4.30	45.68	4:40.75	7282	
10	Bae Sang-hwa	South Korea	11.33	6.69	13.26	1.92	51.56	14.84	37.42	4.40	55.46	4:38.01	7263	
11	Fredriech Pretorius	South Africa	11.28	6.83	12.84	1.95	50.90	15.22	35.29	4.40	56.47	4:52.45	7174	SB
12	Henrik Holmberg	Norway	11.18	6.75	12.89	2.04	50.73	15.19	39.93	4.00	52.29	4:55.69	7173	PB
13	Aaron Booth	New Zealand	11.26	6.38	13.21	1.89	50.86	16.34	39.08	3.80	57.84	4:42.78	6905	
14	Chen Xianbiao	China	11.18	6.66	10.41	1.89	51.97	15.01	41.13	4.50	44.61	5:12.53	6791	
15	Carlos Burlando	Venezuela	11.29	6.93	11.40	1.86	49.50	16.05	35.23	NM	55.76	4:43.43	6309	
	Jackson Henry	New Zealand	11.47	6.82	12.54	1.86	50.90	14.70	34.48	NM	DNS	–	DNF	
	Pavel Rudnyev	Russia	11.27	6.80	12.03	1.71	DNS	–	–	–	–	–	DNF	
	Darko Pešić	Montenegro	DNS	–	–	–	–	–	–	–	–	–	DNS	
