= 2015 Austrian Athletics Championships =

- Dates: 8–9 August 2015
- Host city: Kapfenberg, Austria
- Venue: Franz Fekete Stadium
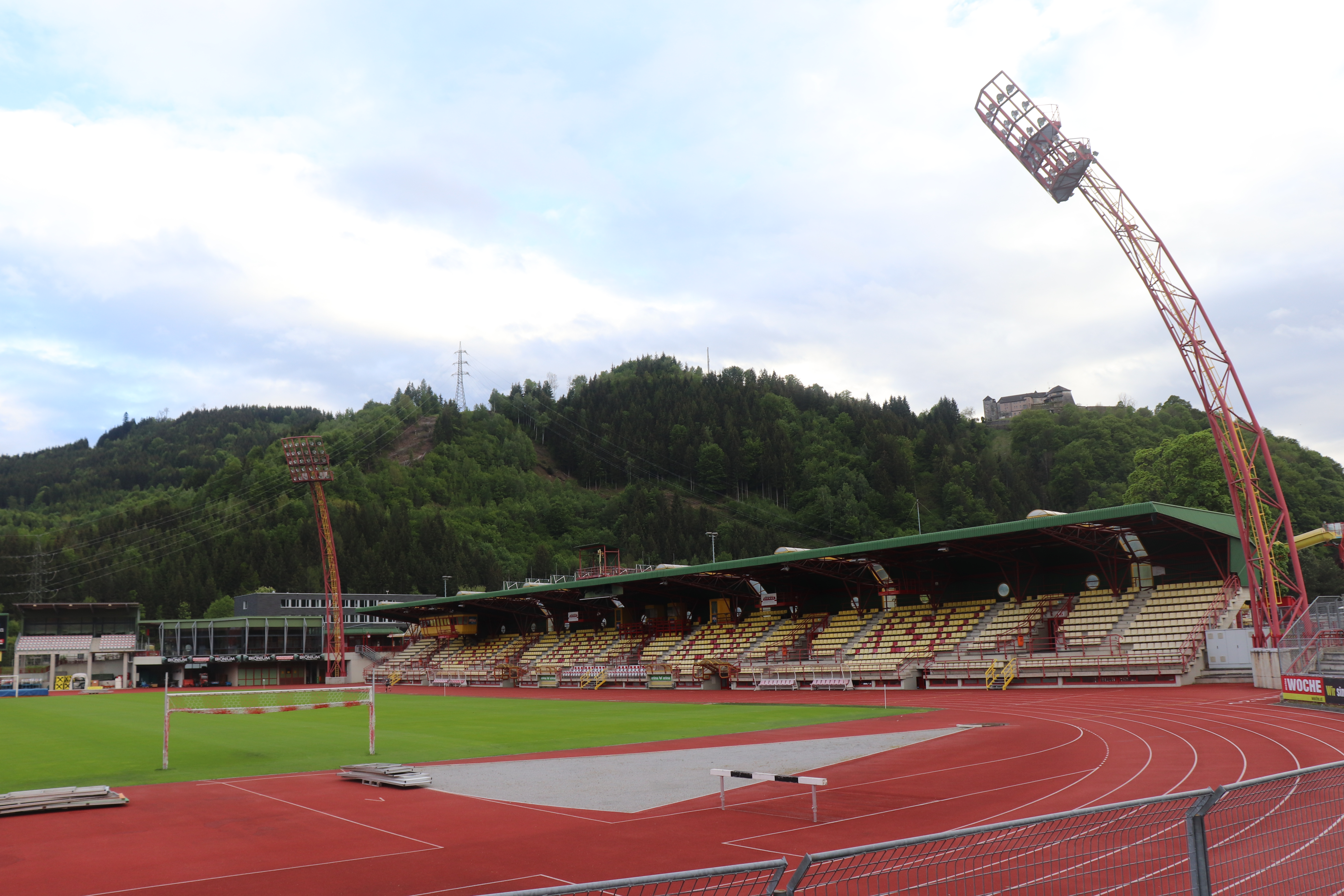

The 2015 Austrian Athletics Championships (German: Österreichische Staatsmeisterschaften in der Leichtathletik 2015) was the year's national championship in outdoor track and field for Austria. It was held on 8 and 9 August at the Franz Fekete Stadium in Kapfenberg. It served as the selection meeting for Austria at the 2015 World Championships in Athletics.

== Results ==
=== Men ===
| Event | Gold | | Silver | | Bronze | |
|---|---|---|---|---|---|---|
| 100 metres | Markus Fuchs | 10.67 | Benjamin Grill | 10.70 | David Göttlinger | 10.80 |
| 200 metres | Christoph Haslauer | 21.69 | Benjamin Grill | 21.77 | Thomas Rosenthaler | 21.78 |
| 400 metres | Mario Gebhardt | 47.76 | Markus Kornfeld | 48.68 | Thomas Kain | 48.87 |
| 800 metres | Günther Matzinger | 1:58.42 | Nikolaus Franzmair | 1:58.67 | Felix Ramprecht | 2:00.68 |
| 1500 metres | Nikolaus Franzmair | 3:50.22 | Andreas Vojta | 3:50.77 | Felix Ramprecht | 3:52.63 |
| 5000 metres | Christian Steinhammer | 15:08.94 | Christoph Sander | 15:11.64 | Luca Sinn | 15:15.33 |
| 110 m hurdles | Dominik Siedlaczek | 14.33 | Martin Kainrath | 14.62 | Florian Domenig | 14.65 |
| 400 m hurdles | Dominik Hufnagl | 51.69 | Thomas Kain | 51.93 | Markus Kornfeld | 52.06 |
| 4 × 100 m relay | ATSV Linz LA; Christoph Rosenthaler; Thomas Rosenthaler; Gregor Erler; Daniel Pawlitschko | 41.19 | DSG Volksbank Wien; Markus Kornfeld; Ekemini Bassey; Florian Domenig; Dominik Siedlaczek | 41.76 | LAC Klagenfurt; Dreier Markus; Grimschitz Kevin; Kucher Federico; Katholnig Rene | 41.80 |
| High jump | Josip Kopic | 2.05 | Andreas Steinmetz | 1.97 | Alexander Dengg | 1.97 |
| Pole vault | Matthias Freinberger | 5.15 | Paul Kilbertus | 4.85 | Oliver Werthner | 4.55 |
| Long jump | Martin Schwingenschuh | 7.30 | Felix Schmid-Schutti | 7.19 | Maximilian Drössler | 7.08 |
| Triple jump | Roman Schmied | 15.78 | Philipp Kronsteiner | 15.63 | Felix Schultschik | 14.56 |
| Shot put | Lukas Weißhaidinger | 18.03 | Gerhard Zillner | 15.46 | Georg Stamminger | 14.89 |
| Discus throw | Lukas Weißhaidinger | 63.08 | Kevin Grimschitz | 44.84 | Gerhard Zillner | 44.32 |
| Hammer throw | Benjamin Siart | 55.77 | Matthias Hayek | 54.97 | Michael Hofer | 52.36 |
| Javelin throw | Matthias Kaserer | 68.54 | Gregor Högler | 64.45 | Martin Strasser | 63.29 |
| 3 × 1000 m relay | SVS-Leichtathletik; Dominik Jandl; Leon Kohn; Stefan Schmid | 8:03.23 | UAB Athletics; Maximilian Rehling; Markus Peschke; Paul Scheucher | 8:08.78 | KSV alutechnik Daniel Karner; Christoph Teubl; Patrick-Tim Mund | 8:28.34 |

=== Women ===
| Event | Gold | | Silver | | Bronze | |
|---|---|---|---|---|---|---|
| 100 metres | Viola Kleiser | 11.90 | Carina Pölzl | 11.92 | Stephanie Bendrat | 11.96 |
| 200 metres | Carina Pölzl | 24.03 | Viola Kleiser | 24.38 | Ina Huemer | 24.54 |
| 400 metres | Julia Schwarzinger | 56.12 | Katharina Taitl | 58.90 | Sigrid Portenschlager | 58.97 |
| 800 metres | Verena Menapace | 2:06.87 | Carina Schrempf | 2:10.59 | Jennifer Wenth | 2:11.13 |
| 1500 metres | Jennifer Wenth | 4:25.39 | Julia Millonig | 4:32.17 | Sandrina Illes | 4:34.35 |
| 5000 metres | Anita Baierl | 16:58.32 | Katharina Kreundl | 17:17.77 | Sandrina Illes | 17:25.97 |
| 100 m hurdles | Beate Schrott | 13.27 | Eva Wimberger | 13.77 | Yvonne Zapfel | 14.03 |
| 400 m hurdles | Verena Menapace | 59.35 | Verena Preiner | 61.15 | Magdalena Baur | 62.94 |
| 4 × 100 m relay | UNION St. Pölten; Agnes Hodi; Viola Kleiser; Valerie Kleiser; Michaela Burda | 47.34 | Zehnkampf-Union; Julia Schwarzinger; Sarah Lagger; Catina Jo Ahrer; Alexandra Scheftner; Birgit Schönfelder | 47.38 | LAC Klagenfurt; Stefanie Waldkircher; Carina Pölzl; Nathalie Kitz; Christina Jellen | 47.98 |
| High jump | Monika Gollner | 1.86 | Ekaterina Krasovskiy | 1.74 | Sarah Lagger | 1.71 |
| Pole vault | Agnes Hodi | 3.90 | Sarah Zimmer | 3.80 | Brigitta Hesch | 3.70 |
| Long jump | Sarah Lagger | 6.31 | Ivona Dadic | 6.11 | Stefanie Waldkircher | 5.73 |
| Triple jump | Michaela Egger | 12.54 | Magdalena Macht | 12.12 | Alexandra Scheftner | 11.48 |
| Shot put | Veronika Watzek | 13.91 | Christina Scheffauer | 13.76 | Stefanie Waldkircher | 13.68 |
| Discus throw | Veronika Watzek | 52.81 | Djeneba Touré | 50.78 | Stefanie Waldkircher | 44.62 |
| Hammer throw | Julia Siart | 51.30 | Bettina Weber | 48.38 | Jacqueline Röbl | 47.18 |
| Javelin throw | Andrea Lindenthaler | 53.34 | Victoria Hudson | 50.71 | Michaela Sturm | 48.16 |
| 3 × 800 m relay | LC Waldviertel; Sarah Führer; Sandra Riener; Adriana Höller | 7:16.79 | KSV alutechnik Maureen Wundsam; Lara Maggele; Bianca Illmaier | 7:22.32 | UAB Athletics; Sophie Grabner; Mahawa Cidibe; Hannah Brückler | 7:48.44 |
