= Athletics at the 2018 Commonwealth Games – Men's decathlon =

Men's decathlon at the 2018 Commonwealth Games
- Venue: Carrara Stadium
- Dates: 9 April (day 1); 10 April (day 2)
- Competitors: 12 from 7 nations
- Winning points: 8303

Medalists
gold medal	Lindon Victor	Grenada
silver medal	Pierce LePage	Canada
bronze medal	Cedric Dubler	Australia

The men's decathlon at the 2018 Commonwealth Games, as part of the athletics programme, took place in the Carrara Stadium on 9 and 10 April 2018.

== Records ==
Prior to this competition, the existing world and Games records were as follows:

World record	Ashton Eaton (USA)	9045 points	Beijing, China	28–29 August 2015
Games record	Daley Thompson (ENG)	8663 points	Edinburgh, Scotland	27–28 July 1986

== Schedule ==
The schedule was as follows:

Date	Time	Round
Monday 9 April 2018	10:05	100 metres
Monday 9 April 2018	10:50	Long jump
Monday 9 April 2018	12:05	Shot put
Monday 9 April 2018	19:00	High jump
Monday 9 April 2018	21:25	400 metres
Tuesday 10 April 2018	10:05	110 metres hurdles
Tuesday 10 April 2018	10:50	Discus throw
Tuesday 10 April 2018	12:45	Pole vault
Tuesday 10 April 2018	19:20	Javelin throw
Tuesday 10 April 2018	20:45	1500 metres

All times are Australian Eastern Standard Time (UTC+10)

== Event results ==
Competitors contested a series of 10 events over two days, with their results being converted into points. The final standings were decided by their cumulative points tallies.

=== 100 metres ===
Results after event 1 of 10:

Rank	Heat	Lane	Athlete	Reaction Time	Time	Points	Notes
1	2	2	Damian Warner (CAN)	0.132	10.29	1025	SB
2	2	3	Pierce LePage (CAN)	0.181	10.62	947	
3	2	5	Cedric Dubler (AUS)	0.145	10.69	931	
4	1	4	Lindon Victor (GRN)	0.170	10.70	929	
5	2	4	John Lane (ENG)	0.130	10.89	885	
6	2	6	Taylor Stewart (CAN)	0.160	11.06	847	
7	1	5	Kyle Cranston (AUS)	0.137	11.16	825	
8	1	7	Kurt Felix (GRN)	0.145	11.20	817	
9	1	6	Atsu Nyamadi (GHA)	0.156	11.27	801	
10	2	7	Gilbert Koech (KEN)	0.186	11.38	778	
11	1	3	Curtis Mathews (WAL)	0.165	11.39	776	
12	1	2	Ben Gregory (WAL)	0.141	11.60	732	
					Wind: -0.1 m/s (H1), 0.0 m/s (H2)		

=== Long jump ===
Results after event 2 of 10:

Rank	Athlete	#1	#2	#3	Mark	Points	Notes	Overall	Overall Rank
1	Cedric Dubler (AUS)	7.32 -0.6 m/s	7.35 +0.4 m/s	7.59 +0.5 m/s	7.59	957	SB	1888	2
2	Damian Warner (CAN)	7.19 -0.8 m/s	7.54 +0.4 m/s	x +0.1 m/s	7.54	945		1970	1
3	Pierce LePage (CAN)	6.83; 0.0 m/s	7.37 +0.3 m/s	7.44; 0.0 m/s	7.44	920	SB	1867	3
4	Kurt Felix (GRN)	7.26 -0.4 m/s	x -0.2 m/s	x +0.8 m/s	7.26	876		1693	7
4	John Lane (ENG)	7.26 +0.3 m/s	x -0.1 m/s	x -0.2 m/s	7.26	876		1761	5
6	Atsu Nyamadi (GHA)	x -1.3 m/s	7.25 +0.5 m/s	7.22 -0.3 m/s	7.25	874		1675	9
7	Lindon Victor (GRN)	6.91 -0.2 m/s	7.18 +0.1 m/s	7.24 +0.2 m/s	7.24	871		1800	4
8	Kyle Cranston (AUS)	6.97 +1.0 m/s	x -0.5 m/s	7.18; 0.0 m/s	7.18	857		1682	8
9	Taylor Stewart (CAN)	7.14 -0.1 m/s	–	–	7.14	847		1694	6
10	Ben Gregory (WAL)	6.47 +0.1 m/s	6.94 +0.7 m/s	5.44 +0.6 m/s	6.94	799		1531	11
11	Curtis Mathews (WAL)	x +1.0 m/s	6.89 +0.5 m/s	6.70 -0.6 m/s	6.89	788		1564	10
12	Gilbert Koech (KEN)	6.38 -0.1 m/s	6.52 +0.6 m/s	6.59 +0.9 m/s	6.59	718		1496	12

=== Shot put ===
Results after event 3 of 10:

Rank	Athlete	#1	#2	#3	Mark	Points	Notes	Overall	Overall Rank
1	Lindon Victor (GRN)	15.79	x	15.64	15.79	838	PB	2638	2
2	Taylor Stewart (CAN)	15.09	15.39	x	15.39	814	PB	2508	5
3	Kurt Felix (GRN)	14.75	15.24	x	15.24	804		2497	6
4	Damian Warner (CAN)	14.53	15.11	13.85	15.11	796	PB	2766	1
5	Atsu Nyamadi (GHA)	14.49	14.22	13.77	14.49	758		2433	7
6	Pierce LePage (CAN)	13.98	x	x	13.98	727		2594	3
7	Kyle Cranston (AUS)	13.49	13.59	13.10	13.59	703		2385	9
8	Gilbert Koech (KEN)	12.67	12.87	13.21	13.21	680	PB	2176	11
9	John Lane (ENG)	12.93	12.86	x	12.93	663		2424	8
10	Ben Gregory (WAL)	12.80	x	12.70	12.80	655		2186	10
11	Cedric Dubler (AUS)	12.32	x	12.34	12.34	627		2515	4
–	Curtis Mathews (WAL)	x	x	x	NM	0		1564	12

=== High jump ===
Results after event 4 of 10:

Rank	Athlete	1.65	1.68	1.71	1.74	1.77	1.80	1.83	1.86	1.89	1.92	1.95	1.98	2.01	2.04	2.07	2.10	Mark	Points	Notes	Overall	Overall Rank
1	Pierce LePage (CAN)	–	–	–	–	–	–	–	–	–	–	o	–	o	o	xo	xxx	2.07	868		3462	2
2	Damian Warner (CAN)	–	–	–	–	–	–	–	–	–	o	o	o	o	xo	xxx		2.04	840	SB	3606	1
3	Cedric Dubler (AUS)	–	–	–	–	–	–	–	–	–	–	–	–	o	–	xxx		2.01	813		3328	4
4	Atsu Nyamadi (GHA)	–	–	–	–	–	–	–	o	xo	o	o	xo	o	xxr			2.01	813	PB	3246	6
5	Lindon Victor (GRN)	–	–	–	–	–	–	–	–	o	xo	xo	xo	xo	xxx			2.01	813		3451	3
6	Kurt Felix (GRN)	–	–	–	–	–	–	–	–	–	–	o	–	xxx				1.95	759		3255	5
7	John Lane (ENG)	–	–	–	–	–	–	–	–	o	o	xxx						1.92	731		3155	7
8	Kyle Cranston (AUS)	–	–	–	–	–	–	o	xo	xxo	xxo	xxx						1.92	731	SB	3116	8
9	Ben Gregory (WAL)	–	–	–	–	–	o	o	o	xo	xxx							1.89	705		2891	9
9	Curtis Mathews (WAL)	–	–	–	–	–	–	o	o	xo	xxx							1.89	705		2269	11
11	Gilbert Koech (KEN)	–	–	o	xo	o	o	xxo	xxx									1.83	653	PB	2829	10
–	Taylor Stewart (CAN)																	DNS	–		DNF	–

=== 400 metres ===
Results after event 5 of 10:

Rank	Heat	Lane	Athlete	Reaction Time	Time	Points	Notes	Overall	Overall Rank
1	1	4	Pierce LePage (CAN)	0.161	47.81	918		4380	2
2	2	5	Damian Warner (CAN)	0.157	48.12	903		4509	1
3	2	4	Cedric Dubler (AUS)	0.143	48.39	890		4218	4
4	1	3	Gilbert Koech (KEN)	0.189	49.28	848		3677	10
5	1	2	Lindon Victor (GRN)	0.167	49.48	839		4290	3
6	2	3	John Lane (ENG)	0.129	49.64	831		3986	7
7	1	7	Kyle Cranston (AUS)	0.163	49.94	817		3933	8
8	2	7	Ben Gregory (WAL)	0.140	50.31	800		3691	9
9	1	6	Atsu Nyamadi (GHA)	0.195	50.45	794		4040	6
10	1	5	Kurt Felix (GRN)	0.177	50.49	792		4047	5
–	2	6	Curtis Mathews (WAL)		DNS	–		DNF	–

=== 110 metres hurdles ===
Results after event 6 of 10:

Rank	Heat	Lane	Name	Reaction Time	Time	Points	Notes	Overall	Overall Rank
1	2	6	Damian Warner (CAN)	0.128	13.89	989		5498	1
2	2	4	Cedric Dubler (AUS)	0.145	14.24	944		5162	3
3	2	2	Pierce LePage (CAN)	0.174	14.71	885		5265	2
4	1	5	Atsu Nyamadi (GHA)	0.146	14.82	871		4911	5
5	1	2	Lindon Victor (GRN)	0.182	14.87	865		5155	4
6	2	3	John Lane (ENG)	0.135	14.96	854		4840	7
7	2	5	Kyle Cranston (AUS)	0.153	15.12	835		4768	8
8	1	6	Ben Gregory (WAL)	0.133	15.16	830		4521	9
9	1	4	Kurt Felix (GRN)	0.143	15.25	820		4867	6
10	1	3	Gilbert Koech (KEN)	0.190	15.63	775	PB	4452	10
					Wind: +0.3 m/s (H1), -0.8 m/s (H2)				

=== Discus throw ===
Results after event 7 of 10:

Rank	Athlete	#1	#2	#3	Mark	Points	Notes	Overall	Overall Rank
1	Lindon Victor (GRN)	52.32	51.62	x	52.32	919		6074	2
2	Kurt Felix (GRN)	45.00	46.58	48.04	48.04	830		5697	6
3	Atsu Nyamadi (GHA)	46.61	x	x	46.61	800	PB	5711	5
4	Damian Warner (CAN)	45.03	46.55	x	46.55	799		6297	1
5	Pierce LePage (CAN)	x	43.90	37.50	43.90	744		6009	3
6	John Lane (ENG)	38.20	43.79	42.45	43.79	742	PB	5582	7
7	Kyle Cranston (AUS)	42.41	x	43.19	43.19	730		5498	8
8	Gilbert Koech (KEN)	33.16	40.80	x	40.80	681	PB	5133	10
9	Cedric Dubler (AUS)	40.59	39.94	x	40.59	677		5839	4
10	Ben Gregory (WAL)	38.85	x	x	38.85	641		5162	9

=== Pole vault ===
Results after event 8 of 10:

Rank	Athlete	Group	(...)	3.10	3.20	3.30	3.40	(...)	4.00	4.10	4.20	4.30	4.40	4.50	4.60	4.70	4.80	4.90	5.00	5.10	Mark	Points	Notes	Overall	Overall Rank
1	Cedric Dubler (AUS)	A	–	–	–	–	–	–	–	–	–	–	–	–	–	xo	–	xo	o	xxx	5.00	910		6749	3
2	Pierce LePage (CAN)	A	–	–	–	–	–	–	–	–	–	–	–	–	–	o	–	xo	xxx		4.90	880	=PB	6889	1
3	John Lane (ENG)	A	–	–	–	–	–	–	–	–	–	–	–	–	xxo	–	o	xxx			4.80	849		6431	4
4	Ben Gregory (WAL)	A	–	–	–	–	–	–	–	–	–	–	–	–	o	–	xxo	–	xxx		4.80	849		6011	8
5	Lindon Victor (GRN)	B	–	–	–	–	–	–	–	–	–	o	o	o	o	xxx					4.60	790	PB	6864	2
6	Kyle Cranston (AUS)	B	–	–	–	–	–	–	–	o	–	o	xo	xxx							4.40	731		6229	7
7	Kurt Felix (GRN)	B	–	–	–	–	–	–	o	–	o	xxx									4.20	673		6370	5
8	Gilbert Koech (KEN)	B	o	xxo	o	xo	xxx														3.30	431	=PB	5564	10
–	Damian Warner (CAN)	A	–	–	–	–	–	–	–	–	–	–	–	xxx							NM	0		6297	6
–	Atsu Nyamadi (GHA)	B	r (2.90)																		NM	0		5711	9

=== Javelin throw ===
Results after event 9 of 10:

Rank	Athlete	#1	#2	#3	Mark	Points	Notes	Overall	Overall Rank
1	Lindon Victor (GRN)	59.92	59.39	71.10	71.10	906		7770	1
2	Kurt Felix (GRN)	67.47	62.79	–	67.47	851		7221	4
3	Kyle Cranston (AUS)	59.50	62.36	61.18	62.36	773		7002	6
4	Gilbert Koech (KEN)	x	58.27	58.24	58.27	712		6276	8
5	Pierce LePage (CAN)	58.24	–	–	58.24	711	PB	7600	2
6	Ben Gregory (WAL)	50.73	57.30	–	57.30	697		6708	7
7	Cedric Dubler (AUS)	54.63	–	–	54.63	657		7406	3
8	John Lane (ENG)	47.76	49.86	x	49.86	587	SB	7018	5
–	Damian Warner (CAN)				DNS	–		DNF	–
–	Atsu Nyamadi (GHA)				DNS	–		DNF	–

=== 1500 metres ===
Results after event 10 of 10:

Rank	Order	Name	Time	Points	Notes
1	5	Ben Gregory (WAL)	4:30.57	741	
2	2	Gilbert Koech (KEN)	4:31.82	733	
3	4	Kyle Cranston (AUS)	4:31.91	732	PB
4	10	Cedric Dubler (AUS)	4:57.03	577	
5	12	Pierce LePage (CAN)	4:58.00	571	
6	9	Kurt Felix (GRN)	5:04.32	535	
7	11	Lindon Victor (GRN)	5:04.75	533	
8	3	John Lane (ENG)	5:08.56	511	

== Standings ==
The highest mark recorded in each event is highlighted in yellow with a diamond symbol.

The final standings were as follows:

Rank	Athlete	Total	Notes	100 m	LJ	SP	HJ	400 m	110 mH	DT	PV	JT	1500 m
1st place, gold medalist(s)	Lindon Victor (GRN)	8303		929	871	838♦	813	839	865	919♦	790	906♦	533
2nd place, silver medalist(s)	Pierce LePage (CAN)	8171	PB	947	920	727	868♦	918♦	885	744	880	711	571
3rd place, bronze medalist(s)	Cedric Dubler (AUS)	7983		931	957♦	627	813	890	944	677	910♦	657	577
4	Kurt Felix (GRN)	7756		817	876	804	758	792	820	830	673	851	535
5	Kyle Cranston (AUS)	7734		825	857	703	731	817	835	730	731	773	732
6	John Lane (ENG)	7529		885	876	663	731	831	854	742	849	587	511
7	Ben Gregory (WAL)	7449		732	799	655	705	800	830	641	849	697	741♦
8	Gilbert Koech (KEN)	7009	PB	778	718	680	653	848	775	681	431	712	733
–	Atsu Nyamadi (GHA)	DNF		801	874	758	813	794	871	800	0	–	–
–	Damian Warner (CAN)	DNF		1025♦	945	796	840	903	989♦	799	0	–	–
–	Curtis Mathews (WAL)	DNF		776	788	0	705	–	–	–	–	–	–
–	Taylor Stewart (CAN)	DNF		847	847	814	–	–	–	–	–	–	–
