= Athletics at the 2017 Summer Universiade – Men's decathlon =

The men's decathlon event at the 2017 Summer Universiade was held on 24 and 25 August at the Taipei Municipal Stadium.

== Medalists ==
Gold	Silver	Bronze
Kyle Cranston; Australia	Juuso Hassi; Finland	Aaron James Booth; New Zealand

== Results ==
=== 100 metres ===
Wind: Heat 1: -0.4 m/s, Heat 2: -0.6 m/s, Heat 3: -1.2 m/s

Rank	Heat	Lane	Name	Nationality	Time	Points	Notes
1	2	8	James Turner	Canada	11.01	858	
2	2	3	Wang Cheng-yuan	Chinese Taipei	11.06	847	SB
3	1	6	Kyle Cranston	Australia	11.13	832	SB
3	3	8	John Lane	Great Britain	11.13	832	
5	2	6	Maksim Andraloits	Belarus	11.14	830	
5	3	4	Samuel Remédios	Portugal	11.14	830	
7	2	7	Juuso Hassi	Finland	11.17	823	
8	1	7	Aaron James Booth	New Zealand	11.19	819	
8	3	3	Jérémy Lelièvre	France	11.19	819	
10	3	7	Fredriech Pretorius	South Africa	11.22	812	
11	2	5	Marvin Bollinger	Germany	11.37	780	
11	3	5	Marek Lukáš	Czech Republic	11.37	780	
13	1	5	Felipe Ruiz	Mexico	11.41	771	
14	2	4	Maxime Maugein	France	11.43	767	YC
15	1	3	Christian Lind Nielsen	Denmark	11.45	763	
15	1	8	Reinis Krēgers	Latvia	11.45	763	
17	3	6	Jefferson Santos	Brazil	11.47	759	
18	1	4	Henrik Holmberg	Norway	11.66	719	

Notes: YC=Yellow Card

=== Long jump ===
Rank	Group	Athlete	Nationality	#1	#2	#3	Result	Points	Notes	Total
1	A	James Turner	Canada	6.48	7.25	7.05	7.25	874		1732
2	B	Aaron James Booth	New Zealand	x	7.17	x	7.17	854	SB	1673
3	B	Wang Cheng-yuan	Chinese Taipei	x	7.15	6.97	7.15	850	SB	1697
4	B	Juuso Hassi	Finland	7.14	6.84	5.07	7.14	847		1670
5	B	Kyle Cranston	Australia	6.99	7.04	7.03	7.04	823	SB	1655
6	A	Jérémy Lelièvre	France	6.75	7.03	6.89	7.03	821		1640
7	A	John Lane	Great Britain	6.94	6.86	6.88	6.94	799		1631
8	A	Maksim Andraloits	Belarus	6.93	x	x	6.93	797		1627
9	A	Fredriech Pretorius	South Africa	6.88	x	x	6.88	785		1597
10	B	Christian Lind Nielsen	Denmark	6.83	6.38	6.39	6.83	774		1537
11	A	Jefferson Santos	Brazil	6.80	6.80	6.79	6.80	767		1534
12	A	Maxime Maugein	France	x	x	6.80	6.80	767	YC	1534
13	B	Reinis Krēgers	Latvia	x	6.70	x	6.70	743		1506
14	A	Marvin Bollinger	Germany	x	6.63	6.64	6.64	729		1509
15	B	Marek Lukáš	Czech Republic	6.53	6.52	6.46	6.53	704		1484
16	B	Henrik Holmberg	Norway	5.09	6.44	6.33	6.44	684		1403
17	B	Felipe Ruiz	Mexico	6.24	x	6.14	6.24	639		1410
	A	Samuel Remédios	Portugal	x	x	x	NM	0		830

=== Shot put ===
Rank	Group	Athlete	Nationality	#1	#2	#3	Result	Points	Notes	Total
1	A	Marek Lukáš	Czech Republic	13.69	13.40	14.45	14.45	756		2240
2	A	Jefferson Santos	Brazil	14.38	14.43	x	14.43	755		2281
3	A	Jérémy Lelièvre	France	x	14.21	14.29	14.29	746		2386
4	A	Juuso Hassi	Finland	13.27	13.15	13.88	13.88	721		2391
5	B	Kyle Cranston	Australia	13.50	13.76	x	13.76	714	SB	2369
6	A	James Turner	Canada	13.64	13.37	13.69	13.69	709		2441
7	A	Maksim Andraloits	Belarus	13.66	13.52	x	13.66	708		2335
8	B	Fredriech Pretorius	South Africa	13.56	x	x	13.56	701		2298
9	B	Aaron James Booth	New Zealand	12.92	13.49	12.77	13.49	697	SB	2370
10	B	Maxime Maugein	France	13.46	12.53	12.52	13.46	695	YC	2229
11	B	Marvin Bollinger	Germany	12.91	12.70	13.45	13.45	695		2204
12	A	John Lane	Great Britain	12.22	12.95	13.24	13.24	682		2313
13	B	Henrik Holmberg	Norway	12.43	13.09	12.65	13.09	673	PB	2076
14	A	Reinis Kregers	Latvia	12.30	12.92	12.96	12.96	665		2171
15	B	Christian Lind Nielsen	Denmark	11.74	12.54	12.68	12.68	648		2185
16	B	Wang Cheng-yuan	Chinese Taipei	12.29	12.56	11.79	12.56	640	SB	2337
17	B	Felipe Ruiz	Mexico	11.77	11.93	12.20	12.20	619		2029
	B	Samuel Remédios	Portugal	–	–	–	DNS			830

=== High jump ===
Rank	Group	Athlete	Nationality	1.74	1.77	1.80	1.83	1.86	1.89	1.92	1.95	1.98	2.01	2.04	2.07	Result	Points	Notes	Total
1	A	Marvin Bollinger	Germany	–	–	–	–	–	–	o	–	o	–	xxo	xxx	2.04	840		3044
2	B	Aaron James Booth	New Zealand	–	–	–	–	–	o	-	xo	o	xxo	xxx	-	2.01	813	SB	3183
3	A	Henrik Holmberg	Norway	–	–	–	o	–	o	–	xxo	o	o	x-	xx	2.01	813	=SB	2889
4	B	Reinis Kregers	Latvia	–	–	–	o	–	xo	–	xo	xxo	xxx			1.98	785	SB	2956
5	A	Kyle Cranston	Australia	–	–	–	–	o	o	o	o	xo	xxx			1.98	785		3154
6	B	Fredriech Pretorius	South Africa	–	–	–	xo	–	o	xxo	o	xxo	xxx			1.98	785	SB	3083
7	B	Juuso Hassi	Finland	–	–	o	o	o	xo	o	xo	xxx				1.95	758	SB	3149
8	A	Maksim Andraloits	Belarus	–	–	–	–	o	o	o	o	xxx				1.95	758		3093
9	A	John Lane	Great Britain	–	–	–	–	o	o	o	xo	xxx				1.95	738		3071
10	A	Jefferson De Carvalho Sant	Brazil	–	–	–	–	o	–	xo	–	xxx				1.92	731		3012
11	A	Maxime Maugein	France	–	–	–	o	o	o	xxo	xxx					1.92	731	YC	2960
12	B	James Turner	Canada	–	xo	–	o	xxx								1.83	653		3094
13	B	Marek Lukáš	Czech Republic	–	–	o	xxx									1.80	627		2867
14	B	Christian Lind Nielsen	Denmark	x	xo	o	xxx									1.80	627		2812
15	B	Jérémy Lelièvre	France	–	–	xo	xxx									1.80	627		3013
16	B	Wang Cheng-yuan	Chinese Taipei	o	o	xxo	xxx									1.80	627		2964
	A	Felipe Ruiz	Mexico	–	xxx											NM	0		2029
	A	Samuel Remédios	Portugal													DNS	0		830

=== 400 metres ===
Rank	Heat	Lane	Name	Nationality	Time	Points	Notes	Total
1	2	8	Kyle Cranston	Australia	48.99	862	PB	4016
2	3	7	James Turner	Canada	49.13	855		3949
3	3	5	Jérémy Lelièvre	France	49.31	847		3860
4	3	8	Maksim Andraloits	Belarus	49.38	843		3936
5	1	3	Aaron James Booth	New Zealand	49.75	826	SB	4009
6	1	8	Wang Cheng-yuan	Chinese Taipei	50.02	814	SB	3778
7	3	6	Maxime Maugen	France	50.32	800	YC	3760
8	2	5	Marek Lukáš	Czech Republic	50.64	785		3652
9	3	4	Juuso Hassi	Finland	50.80	778		3927
10	2	4	Christian Lind Nielsen	Denmark	51.70	738		3587
11	1	4	Henrik Holmberg	Norway	51.13	763	SB	3652
12	3	3	John Lane	Great Britain	51.17	761		3832
13	1	5	Reinis Krēgers	Latvia	51.61	742	SB	3698
14	2	7	Fredriech Pretorius	South Africa	51.70	738		3821
15	2	3	Felipe Ruiz	Mexico	51.93	728		2757
	2	6	Jefferson Santos	Brazil	DNF	0		3012
	1	6	Marvin Bollinger	Germany	DNS	0		3044
	1	7	Samuel Remédios	Portugal	DNS	0		830

=== 110 metres hurdles ===
Wind: Heat 1: -1.6 m/s, Heat 2: -0.2 m/s, Heat 3: +1.2 m/s

Rank	Heat	Lane	Name	Nationality	Time	Points	Notes	Total
1	3	3	Maxime Maugein	France	14.69	887	YC	4647
2	3	5	Maksim Andraloits	Belarus	14.84	869	F1	4805
3	3	6	Frediech Pretorius	South Africa	14.96	854		4675
4	3	8	Marek Lukáš	Czech Republic	15.00	850		4502
5	2	7	Wang Cheng-yuan	Chinese Taipei	15.03	846		4624
6	2	6	Kyle Cranston	Australia	15.11	836		4852
8	2	3	Juuso Hassi	Finland	15.17	829		4756
8	2	8	Jérémy Lelièvre	France	15.18	828		4688
9	2	4	Christian Lind Nielsen	Denmark	15.33	810		4397
10	3	7	John Lane	Great Britain	15.67	770		4602
11	1	3	Henrik Holmberg	Norway	15.82	753		4405
12	1	4	Aaron James Booth	New Zealand	15.85	750		4759
13	1	6	Reinis Kregers	Latvia	16.62	665		4363
	2	5	James Turner	Canada	DQ	0	R168.7b	3949
	1	7	Marvin Bollinger	Germany	DNS			3044
	3	4	Jefferson Santos	Brazil	DNS			3012
	1	5	Felipe Ruiz	Mexico	DNS			2757

Note: Fn: False start.

=== Discus throw ===
Rank	Group	Athlete	Nationality	#1	#2	#3	Result	Points	Notes	Total
1	A	Maksim Andraloits	Belarus	43.31	41.35	43.19	43.31	732		5537
2	A	Jérémy Lelièvre	France	28.32	38.50	43.02	43.02	726		5414
3	B	Henrik Holmberg	Norway	38.65	40.10	42.86	42.86	723	SB	5128
4	B	Fredriech Pretorius	South Africa	40.25	41.93	x	41.93	704		5379
5	A	Juuso Antero Cranston	Finland	41.84	x	x	41.84	702		5458
6	A	Kyle Cranston	Australia	39.28	25.44	41.53	41.53	696		5548
7	A	Aaron James Booth	New Zealand	40.33	39.03	41.45	41.45	694		5453
8	A	James Turner	Canada	38.20	41.14	40.40	41.14	688		4637
9	A	Reinis Krēgers	Latvia	36.84	39.86	38.03	39.86	662		5025
10	B	Marek Lukáš	Czech Republic	39.19	39.28	38.18	39.28	650		5152
11	A	John Lane	Great Britain	37.68	x	38.14	38.14	627		5229
12	B	Maxime Maugein	France	x	37.09	37.92	37.92	622	YC	5269
13	B	Wang Cheng-yuan	Chinese Taipei	33.11	35.61	33.60	35.61	576	SB	5200
14	B	Christian Lind Nielsen	Denmark	30.33	x	26.55	30.33	471		4868
	B	Marvin Bollinger	Germany				DNS			3044
	A	Jefferson Santos	Brazil				DNS			3012
	B	Felipe De Jesus Ruiz Lopez	Mexico				DNS			2757

=== Pole vault ===
Rank	Group	Athlete	Nationality	3.60	3.70	3.80	3.90	4.00	4.10	4.20	4.30	4.40	4.50	4.60	4.70	4.80	Result	Points	Notes	Total
1	B	Juuso Hassi	Finland	–	–	–	–	–	–	o	o	o	xo	o	o	xxx	4.70	819	=SB	6277
2	A	Maxime Maugein	France	–	–	–	–	–	–	–	–	xo	–	xxo	o	xxx	4.70	819	YC	6088
3	B	Kyle Cranston	Australia	–	–	–	–	xo	–	o	o	o	xxo	o	xxx		4.60	790	SB	6338
4	B	Reinis Krēgers	Latvia	–	–	–	–	o	–	xxo	–	o	–	xxo	–	xxx	4.60	790	=SB	5815
5	A	Marek Lukáš	Czech Republic	–	–	–	–	–	–	–	–	o	o	xxo	xxx		4.60	790		5942
6	A	Fedriech Pretorius	South Africa	–	–	–	–	–	–	–	–	xo	–	xxo	xxx		4.60	790		6169
7	B	Maksim Andraloits	Belarus	–	–	–	–	–	–	xo	o	xo	xxo	xxx			4.50	760		6297
8	A	Jérémy Lelièvre	France	–	–	–	–	–	–	xo	xxx						4.20	673		6087
9	A	James Turner	Canada	–	–	–	–	–	–	xxo	–	xxx					4.20	673		5310
10	B	Aaron James Booth	New Zealand	–	–	–	–	o	–	o	–	xxx					4.20	673	SB	6126
11	B	Wang Cheng-yuan	Chinese Taipei	–	–	o	o	o	xxo	xxo	xxx						4.20	673	SB	5873
12	B	Christian Lind Nielsen	Denmark	xo	o	o	xo	o	xxx								4.00	617		5485
13	B	Henrik Holmberg	Norway	xo	xxo	xxx											3.70	535		5663
	A	John Lane	Great Britain														DNS			5529
	A	Marvin Bollinger	Germany														DNS			3044
	A	Jefferson Santos	Brazil														DNS			3012
	A	Felipe De Jesus Lopez	Mexico														DNS			2757

=== Javelin throw ===
Rank	Athlete	Nationality	#1	#2	#3	Result	Points	Notes	Total
1	Marek Lukáš	Czech Republic	67.20	65.80	–	67.20	847		6789
2	James Turner	Canada	55.05	59.31	59.48	59.48	730	SB	6040
3	Kyle Cranston	Australia	56.30	53.14	50.81	56.30	682		7020
4	Aaron James Booth	New Zealand	55.23	54.84	x	55.23	666		6792
5	Reinis Krēgers	Latvia	x	54.92	53.25	54.92	662	SB	6831
6	Juuso Hassi	Finland	49.52	x	54.56	54.56	656		6933
7	Maksim Andraloits	Belarus	51.53	49.86	x	51.53	611		6908
8	Jérémy Lelièvre	France	50.97	51.36	50.18	51.36	609		6696
9	Christian Lind Nielsen	Denmark	50.66	x	50.21	50.66	598		6083
10	Fredriech Pretorius	South Africa	50.65	x	x	50.65	598		6767
11	Maxime Maugein	France	x	50.20	x	50.20	592		6680
12	Wang Cheng-yuan	Chinese Taipei	x	49.13	x	49.13	576		6449
13	Henrik Holmberg	Norway	47.13	46.59	46.27	47.13	546		6209

=== 1500 metres ===
Rank	Name	Nationality	Time	Points	Notes	Total
1	Aaron James Booth	New Zealand	4:32.11	731		7523
2	James Turner	Canada	4:34.76	714		6754
3	Jérémy Lelièvre	France	4:38.23	691		7387
4	Kyle Cranston	Australia	4:42.08	667		7687
5	Reinis Krēgers	Latvia	4:42.35	666		7143
6	Maxime Maugein	France	4:47.34	635	YC	7315
7	Juuso Hassi	Finland	4:47.67	633		7566
8	Fredrieh Pretorius	South Africa	4:49.33	623		7390
9	Marek Lukáš	Czech Republic	4:51.34	611		7400
10	Christian Lind Nielsen	Denmark	4:51.46	610		6693
11	Henrik Holmberg	Norway	4:51.86	607		6816
12	Maksim Andraloits	Belarus	4:59.34	564		7472
13	Wang Cheng-yuan	Chinese Taipei	5:10.04	503		6952

=== Final standings ===
The highest mark recorded in each event is highlighted in yellow

Rank	Athlete	Nationality	100m	LJ	SP	HJ	400m	110m H	DT	PV	JT	1500m	Points	Notes
1st place, gold medalist(s)	Kyle Cranston	Australia	11.13	7.04	13.76	1.98	48.99	15.11	41.53	4.60	56.30	4:42.08	7687	SB
2nd place, silver medalist(s)	Juuso Hassi	Finland	11.17	7.14	13.88	1.95	50.80	15.17	41.84	4.70	54.56	4:47.67	7566	
3rd place, bronze medalist(s)	Aaron Booth	New Zealand	11.19	7.17	13.49	2.01	49.75	15.85	41.45	4.20	55.23	4:32.11	7523	PB
4	Maksim Andraloits	Belarus	11.14	6.93	13.66	1.95	49.38	14.84	43.31	4.50	51.53	4:59.34	7472	
5	Marek Lukáš	Czech Republic	11.37	6.53	14.45	1.80	50.64	15.00	39.28	4.60	67.20	4:51.34	7400	
6	Fredriech Pretorius	South Africa	11.22	6.88	13.56	1.98	51.70	14.96	41.93	4.60	50.65	4:49.33	7390	
7	Jérémy Lelièvre	France	11.19	7.03	14.29	1.80	49.31	15.18	43.02	4.20	51.36	4:38.23	7387	
8	Maxime Maugein	France	11.43	6.80	13.46	1.92	50.32	14.69	37.92	4.70	50.20	4:47.34	7315	
9	Reinis Krēgers	Latvia	11.45	6.70	12.96	1.98	51.61	16.62	39.86	4.60	54.92	4:42.35	7143	
10	Wang Cheng-yuan	Chinese Taipei	11.06	7.15	12.56	1.80	50.02	15.03	35.61	4.20	49.13	5:10.04	6952	PB
11	Henrik Holmberg	Norway	11.66	6.44	13.09	2.01	51.13	15.82	42.86	3.70	47.13	4:51.86	6816	PB
12	James Turner	Canada	11.01	7.25	13.69	1.83	49.13	DQ	41.14	4.20	59.48	4:34.76	6754	
13	Christian Lind Nielsen	Denmark	11.45	6.83	12.68	1.80	50.86	15.33	30.33	4.00	50.66	4:51.46	6693	
	John Lane	Great Britain	11.13	6.94	13.24	1.95	51.17	15.67	38.14	DNS	–	–	DNF	
	Jefferson Santos	Brazil	11.47	6.80	14.43	1.92	DNF	DNS	–	–	–	–	DNF	
	Felipe Ruiz	Mexico	11.41	6.24	12.20	NM	51.93	DNS	–	–	–	–	DNF	
	Marvin Bollinger	Germany	11.37	6.64	13.45	2.04	DNS	–	–	–	–	–	DNF	
	Samuel Remédios	Portugal	11.14	NM	DNS	–	–	–	–	–	–	–	DNF	
