= Marek Lukáš =

Czech decathlete

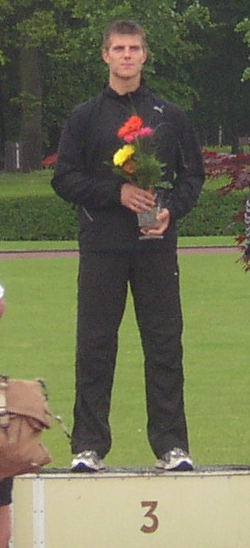
- Marek Lukáš in 2013

Personal information
- Born: 16 July 1991 (age 34)
- Education: Charles University in Prague
- Height: 1.80 m (5 ft 11 in)
- Weight: 75 kg (165 lb)

Sport
- Sport: Athletics
- Event: Decathlon
- Club: PSK Olymp Praha
- Coached by: Josef Karas

Marek Lukáš (born 16 July 1991) is a Czech athlete competing in the combined events. He represented his country at three outdoor and one indoor European Championships.

== International competitions ==
Year	Competition	Venue	Position	Event	Notes
Representing the Czech Republic
2013	European Junior Championships	Rieti, Italy	–	Decathlon (junior)	DNF
2014	World Junior Championships	Eugene, United States	17th	Decathlon (junior)	7278 pts
2013	European U23 Championships	Tampere, Finland	8th	Decathlon	7606 pts
2014	European Championships	Zürich, Switzerland	16th	Decathlon	7660 pts
2015	European Indoor Championships	Prague, Czech Republic	9th	Heptathlon	5865 pts
2016	European Championships	Amsterdam, Netherlands	14th	Decathlon	7625 pts
2017	Universiade	Taipei, Taiwan	5th	Decathlon	7400 pts
2018	European Championships	Berlin, Germany	14th	Decathlon	7683 pts

== Personal bests ==
Outdoor

- 100 metres – 10.98 (+1.1 m/s, Kladno 2014)
- 400 metres – 49.74 (Ribeira Brava 2014)
- 1500 metres – 4:31.63 (Ribeira Brava 2014)
- 110 metres hurdles – 14.27 (+0.9 m/s, Kladno 2016)
- High jump – 1.93 (Kladno 2015)
- Pole vault – 4.80 (Prague 2016)
- Long jump – 7.17 (+0.8 m/s, Kladno 2013)
- Shot put – 14.71 (Prague 2016)
- Discus throw – 42.59 (Kladno 2018)
- Javelin throw – 73.28 (Ustí Nad Orlicí 2013)
- Decathlon – 7903 (Kladno 2016)

Indoor

- 60 metres – 6.93 (Prague 2015)
- 200 metres – 22.65 (Prague 2014)
- 1000 metres – 2:44.11 (Prague 2017)
- 60 metres hurdles – 7.94 (Ostrava 2016)
- High jump – 1.98 (Prague 2015)
- Pole vault – 4.90 (Prague 2017)
- Long jump – 7.22 (Prague 2018)
- Shot put – 14.91 (Prague 2017)
- Heptathlon – 5883 (Prague 2015)
