= Kyle Cranston =

Australian decathlete

Personal information
- Born: 3 September 1992 (age 33) Goulburn, New South Wales, Australia
- Education: University of North Carolina; Australian Catholic University
- Height: 1.86 m (6 ft 1 in)
- Weight: 82 kg (181 lb)

Sport
- Sport: Athletics
- Event: Decathlon
- College team: University of North Carolina Tar Heels
- Coached by: John Quinn

Kyle Cranston (born 3 September 1992) is an Australian athlete competing in the combined events. He won the gold medal at the 2017 Summer Universiade. In addition, he competed at the 2018 Commonwealth Games in Gold Coast finishing fifth.

His father Rod Cranston was a runner.

== International competitions ==
| Year | Competition | Venue | Position | Event | Notes |
Representing Australia
| 2015 | Universiade | Gwangju, South Korea | 8th | Decathlon | 7295 pts |
| 2017 | Universiade | Taipei, Taiwan | 1st | Decathlon | 7687 pts |
| 2018 | Commonwealth Games | Gold Coast, Australia | 5th | Decathlon | 7734 pts |

== Personal bests ==
Outdoor

- 100 metres – 10.96 (+1.7 m/s, Gold Coast 2018)
- 200 metres – 23.72 (+1.8 m/s, Canberra 2010)
- 400 metres – 48.99 (Taipei 2017)
- 1500 metres – 4:31.91 (Gold Coast 2018)
- 110 metres hurdles – 14.74 (+0.2 m/s, Sydney 2016)
- High jump – 1.99 (Canberra 2017)
- Pole vault – 4.60 (Brisbane 2015)
- Long jump – 7.26 (+0.6 m/s, Gold Coast 2018)
- Shot put – 13.76 (Taipei 2017)
- Discus throw – 45.96 (Sydney 2016)
- Javelin throw – 62.36 (Gold Coast 2018)
- Decathlon – 7786 (Gold Coast 2018)
