= Pierce LePage =

Canadian decathlete (born 1996)

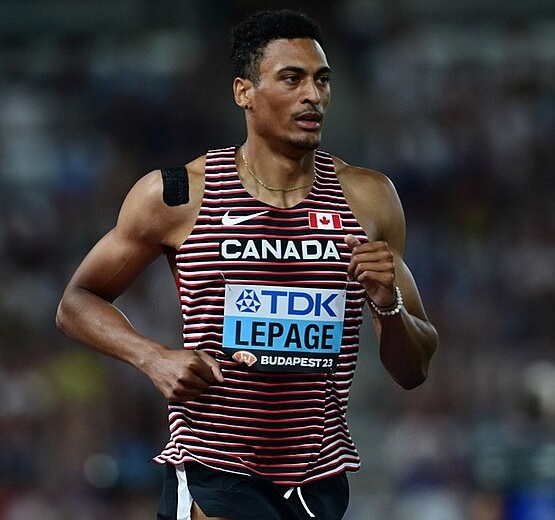

Personal information
- Born: January 22, 1996 (age 30) Whitby, Ontario, Canada
- Height: 204 cm (6 ft 8 in)
- Weight: 88 kg (194 lb)

Sport
- Sport: Track
- Event: Decathlon
- Coached by: Gregory Portnoy

Achievements and titles
- Highest world ranking: 1st (2023)
- Personal best: Decathlon: 8,909 (Budapest 2023)
Medal record
Men's athletics
Representing Canada
World Championships
Gold medal – first place	2023 Budapest	Decathlon
Silver medal – second place	2022 Eugene	Decathlon
Commonwealth Games
Silver medal – second place	2018 Gold Coast	Decathlon
Pan American Games
Bronze medal – third place	2019 Lima	Decathlon

Pierce LePage (born January 22, 1996) is a Canadian track athlete who competes in the decathlon. He is the 2023 World champion, and the first Canadian to win the decathlon title at the World Athletics Championships. LePage is also the 2022 World silver medalist, 2018 Commonwealth silver medallist, and 2019 Pan American bronze medallist. LePage represented Canada at the 2020 Summer Olympics, finishing in fifth place.

== Career ==
=== Early years and Commonwealth silver (2015–18) ===
Starting track and field at the age of 12 and the decathlon at the age of 17, LePage emerged as a star athlete in 2015 after breaking the Canadian junior decathlon record. LePage then gained funding through the RBC Training Ground talent identification program in 2016. That same year he attended the Décastar meet, and scored above 8000 points for the first time. In 2017, LePage attended the Hypo-Meeting for the first time, finishing in seventeenth position, and then won the NACAC Combined Events Championships. Domestically, he won the decathlon event at the 2017 Canadian Track and Field Championships, albeit in the absence of then-reigning Olympic bronze medalist Damian Warner.

LePage was named to the Canadian team for the 2018 Commonwealth Games taking place in Gold Coast, Australia. In his first major championship appearance, he unexpectedly drew major media attention in his home country when teammate Warner, who led the event until midway through the second day, was triple-faulted in the pole vault and withdrew from the event. LePage then became the focus of the country's medal hopes and scored a personal best 8,171 points to win the silver medal behind Lindon Victor of Grenada. After his podium finish, LePage said that "for me, this is a huge stepping stone going from local competitions to a big event like the Commonwealth Games." He credited Warner for his support, calling him "someone to talk to, lean on if you need help and at Commonwealth he was helpful — I probably couldn't have a won a silver medal without him there because he's a great leader by example." However, the remainder of his season was derailed by UCL and hamstring injuries, the latter sustained in an attempted comeback at the Décastar.

=== World Championship and Olympic debuts (2019–21) ===
In June of the 2019 season, LePage scored 8453 points to win the Décastar meeting in Talence, France, obtaining the qualifying standard for both the Olympics and World Championships. Named to the Canadian team for the 2019 Pan American Games in Lima alongside Warner, he was second in the standings after the first day of competition, with Warner in first. He dropped to third on the second day, surpassed by Grenada's Victor, and won the bronze medal. LePage noted that he was dealing with a knee injury he had incurred at the national championships earlier. He then made his World Championship debut at the 2019 edition in Doha, and finished fifth in the decathlon event with a score of 8445. As at the Pan American Games, he was in second place after the first day but ultimately dropped off the podium in the final two events, the javelin throw and the 1500 metres. He admitted afterward to being "a bit frustrated because of so many things that could've gone much better, but it's my first world championships, so what can you do." His high scores across the season lead to his placing third in the seasonal IAAF Combined Events Challenge.

Due to the onset of the COVID-19 pandemic, the 2020 Summer Olympics in Tokyo were delayed by a full year, and training became difficult with many facilities shut down. LePage noted that he was "training in a random field outside my house for about a year. Just running. I didn't pole vault for a year, didn’t do high jump, long jump." LePage was named to his first Olympic team when the time came. Prior to the Games he participated in the 2021 Hypo-Meeting and won the silver medal behind Warner, setting new personal bests in the 100 metres, the 110 metres hurdles, and 1500 metres. Competing in Tokyo, LePage was in third place after the first day of the decathlon, though he noted that he was "going through some stuff" that impacted his ability to do the high jump. A year later he would later reveal that he had been competing through a torn patella tendon, saying "I don't like having excuses. It was an experience I will never forget, and I learned from it." He ultimately finished in fifth place, though he achieved a new personal best mark.

=== World silver and gold (2022–present) ===
LePage attended the 2022 Hypo-Meeting but only participated in the 100 metres and the long jump before withdrawing. At the 2022 World Athletics Championships, LePage finished the first day of the decathlon in second place, after Warner was forced to withdraw because of a hamstring injury. On the second day, consecutive personal best performances in the hurdles and discus throw briefly elevated him into first place, but he was passed by Frenchman Kevin Mayer after the javelin and won the silver medal with a personal best score of 8701 points. On his podium finish, LePage noted that he had "always been high in the standings and then drop off near the end, and it was so much disappointment. To finally be on top, to stay on the podium is amazing." LePage was initially named to the Canadian team for the 2022 Commonwealth Games, but withdrew after the World Championships, with Athletics Canada citing a need "to properly recover and prepare for the rest of the season."

At the 2023 Hypo-Meeting, LePage set new personal bests in both the 100 m and the javelin throw, winning the gold medal in an upset victory over Warner, the seven-time and defending champion. His score of 8700 points was one shy of his personal best. Competing at the 2023 World Athletics Championships, LePage excelled on the first day of the decathlon, and was in second place at the halfway point of the event, ahead of Warner and behind German Leo Neugebauer. LePage began the second day with a new personal best 13.77 in the 110 m hurdles, taking the overall lead from Neugebauer, which he would retain for the remainder of the event, which included his second-best javelin mark ever (60.90 m). He took the gold medal, the first decathlon win for a Canadian man, and stood on the podium with Warner and Victor. His 8909 points were a new personal best, the sixth-highest in history, and the second-best winning margin at a World Athletics Championships after Ashton Eaton's 2015 event record. LePage revealed he had persevered through a couple of "close calls" with injury during the event, and said that "I've done so many decathlons with Damian and we're always supporting each other, so it's nice to share this podium with him."

LePage sustained a disc herniation in April 2024. He was initially projected to be able to recovery in time to participate in the 2024 Summer Olympics in Paris, but was ultimately forced to withdraw from the event in late July. He said that he would undergo surgery in advance of the 2025 season.

== Personal bests (outdoor) ==
As of 19 June 2025

Event	Performance	Location	Date	Points
Decathlon	—N/a	Budapest	25–26 August 2023	8,909 points
100 metres	10.28 (+1.5 m/s)	Götzis	27 May 2023	1,028 points
Long jump	7.80 m (25 ft 7 in) (+0.0 m/s)	Montreal	26 July 2019	1,020 points
Shot put	15.99 m (52 ft 5 1/2 in)	Baton Rouge	22 April 2023	851 points
High jump	2.09 m (6 ft 10 1/4 in)	Götzis	27 May 2017	887 points
400 metres	46.84	Eugene	23 July 2022	966 points
110 metres hurdles	13.77 (+0.2 m/s)	Budapest	26 August 2023	1,004 points
Discus throw	53.26 m (174 ft 8 3/4 in)	Eugene	24 July 2022	939 points
Pole vault	5.25 m (17 ft 2 1/2 in)	Talence	23 June 2019	988 points
Javelin throw	63.09 m (206 ft 11 3/4 in)	Götzis	28 May 2023	784 points
1500 metres	4:31.85	Tokyo	5 August 2021	733 points
Virtual Best Performance				9,190 points

== Championship results ==
Year	Competition	Venue	Position	Event	Result
Representing Canada
2018	Commonwealth Games	Gold Coast, Australia	2nd	Decathlon	8171 points
2019	Pan American Games	Lima, Peru	3rd	Decathlon	8161 points
2019	World Championships	Doha, Qatar	5th	Decathlon	8445 points
2021	Olympic Games	Tokyo, Japan	5th	Decathlon	8604 points
2022	World Championships	Eugene, United States	2nd	Decathlon	8701 points
2023	World Championships	Budapest, Hungary	1st	Decathlon	8909 points
2025	World Championships	Tokyo, Japan	–	Decathlon	DNF

== Sources ==
- Damian Warner leads decathlon after 100m, Pierce LePage in 2nd
- Pierce LePage leads decathlon after long jump
- LePage happy with decathlon finish at track and field worlds
