= Thomas Van der Plaetsen =

Belgian decathlete

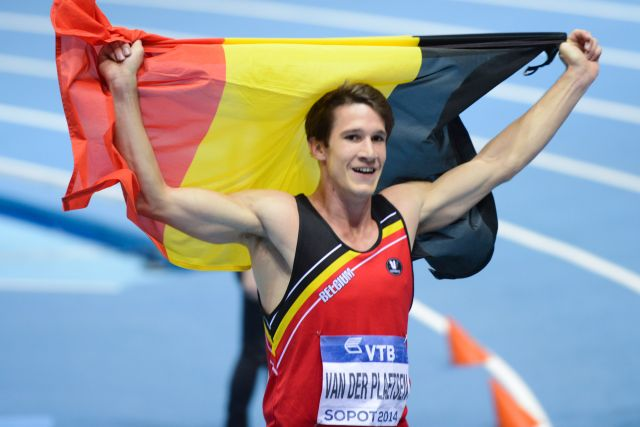
- Thomas Van der Plaetsen during the 2014 World Indoor Championships

Personal information
- Full name: Thomas Van der Plaetsen
- Born: 24 December 1990 (age 35) Ghent, Belgium
- Education: Ghent University
- Height: 186 cm (6 ft 1 in)
- Weight: 81 kg (179 lb)

Sport
- Country: Belgium
- Sport: Track and field athletics
- Event: Decathlon
- Coached by: Michael Van Der Plaetsen

Achievements and titles
- World finals: 2
- Personal best: 8430 pts
Medal record
Men's athletics
Representing Belgium
European Championships
Gold medal – first place	2016 Amsterdam	Decathlon
World Indoor Championships
Bronze medal – third place	2014 Sopot	Heptathlon
Universiade
Gold medal – first place	2013 Kazan	Decathlon
Gold medal – first place	2015 Gwangju	Decathlon

Thomas Van der Plaetsen (born 24 December 1990 in Ghent) is a Belgian decathlete. His biggest achievements are winning the gold medal for decathlon at the 2016 European Athletics Championships, winning bronze medal for heptathlon at the 2014 World Indoor Championships, and gold medal for decathlon at the 2013 and 2015 Summer Universiade.

== International competitions ==
Year	Competition	Venue	Position	Event	Notes
Representing Belgium
2009	European Junior Championships	Novi Sad, Serbia	1st	Decathlon	7769 pts
2011	European Indoor Championships	Paris, France	6th	Heptathlon	6020
2011	European U23 Championships	Ostrava, Czech Republic	1st	Decathlon	8157
2011	World Championships	Daegu, South Korea	13th	Decathlon	8069
2013	Universiade	Kazan, Russia	1st	Decathlon	8164
2013	World Championships	Moscow, Russia	15th	Decathlon	8255
2014	World Indoor Championships	Sopot, Poland	3rd	Heptathlon	6259
2014	European Championships	Zürich, Switzerland	10th	Decathlon	8105
2015	Universiade	Gwangju, South Korea	1st	Decathlon	7952
2015	World Championships	Beijing, China	14th	Decathlon	8035
2016	European Championships	Amsterdam, Netherlands	1st	Decathlon	8218
2016	Olympic Games	Rio de Janeiro, Brazil	8th	Decathlon	8332
2017	World Championships	London, United Kingdom	–	Decathlon	DNF
2018	European Championships	Berlin, Germany	–	Decathlon	DNF
2019	European Indoor Championships	Glasgow, United Kingdom	6th	Heptathlon	5989
2019	World Championships	Doha, Qatar	9th	Decathlon	8125
2021	Olympic Games	Tokyo, Japan	–	Decathlon	DNF
2024	European Championships	Rome, Italy	11th	Decathlon	8084

== Personal bests ==
Outdoor

- 100 metres – 11.04 (+0.6 m/s; Götzis 2014)
- 400 metres – 48.64 (Ostrava 2011)
- 1500 metres – 4:32.52 (Götzis 2011)
- 110 metres hurdles – 14.36 (-0.3 m/s; Götzis 2021)
- High jump – 2.17 (Daegu 2011)
- Pole vault – 5.45 (Talence 2019)
- Long jump – 7.90 (+1.1 m/s; Götzis 2021)
- Shot put – 14.28 (Parow 2019)
- Discus Throw – 48.81 (Deinze 2021)
- Javelin throw – 65.31 (Moscow 2013)
- Decathlon – 8430 (Götzis 2021)

Indoor

- 60 metres – 7.13 (Sopot 2014)
- 1000 metres – 2:40.50 (Sopot 2014)
- 60 metres hurdles – 8.06 (Mondeville 2014)
- High jump – 2.13 (Ghent 2012)
- Pole vault – 5.50 (Ghent 2019)
- Long jump – 7.78 (Apeldoorn 2014)
- Shot put – 14.32 (Sopot 2014)
- Heptathlon – 6259 (Sopot 2014)

== Health problems ==
In October 2014, it became known that during an unannounced doping control test in September 2014, Van der Plaetsen had tested positive for the hormone HCG. On 2 October 2014, Van der Plaetsen revealed that those heightened HCG levels were caused by up to then undiagnosed testicular cancer, for which he was then treated.
