= Bastien Auzeil =

French decathlete

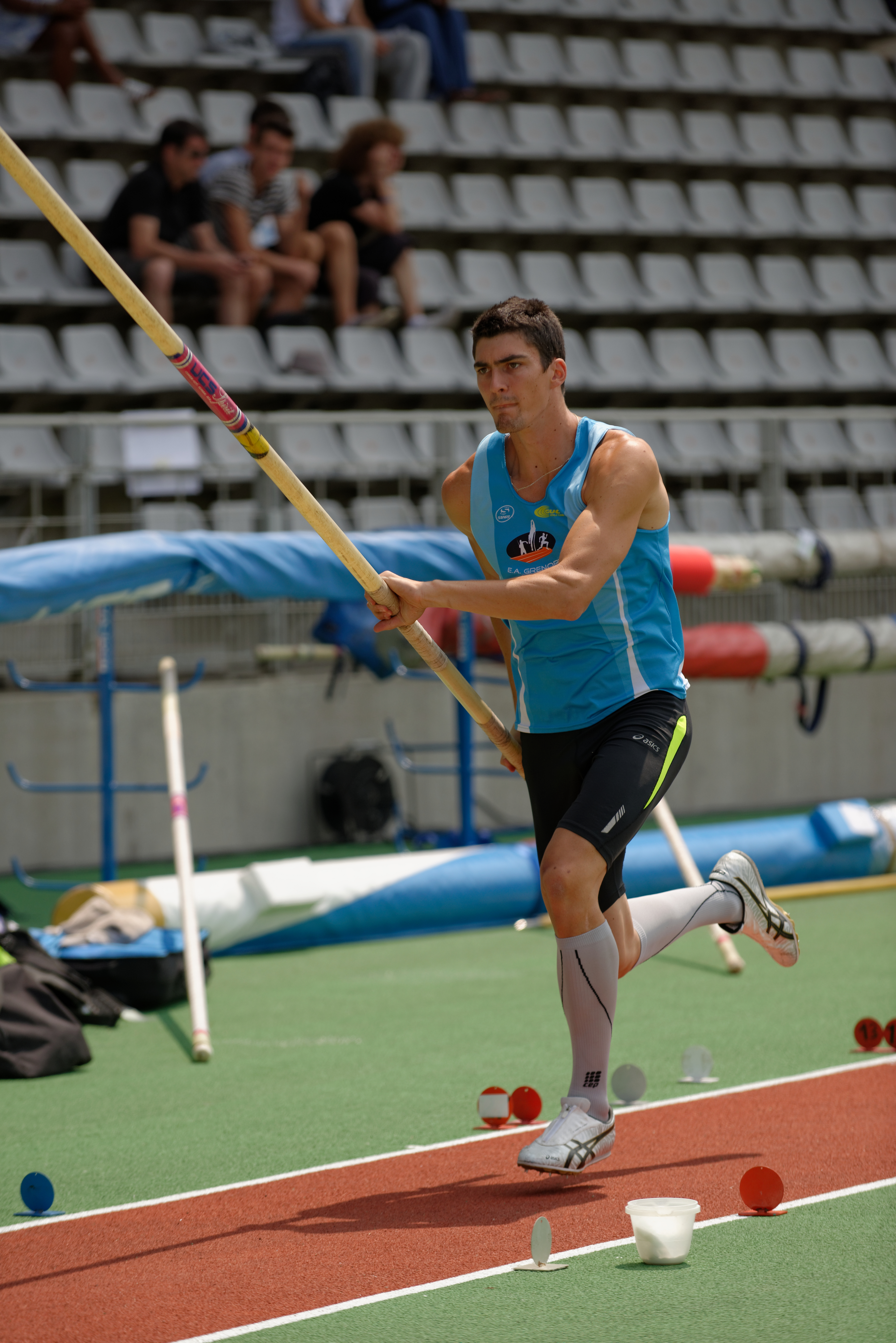
- Bastien Auzeil in 2013

Personal information
- Born: 22 October 1989 (age 36) Pont-de-Beauvoisin, France
- Education: Grenoble School of Management
- Height: 1.95 m (6 ft 5 in)
- Weight: 90 kg (198 lb)

Sport
- Sport: Athletics
- Event: Decathlon
- Club: Entente Athletique Grenoble 38

Bastien Auzeil (born 22 October 1989 in Pont-de-Beauvoisin) is a French athlete competing in the decathlon. He won the silver medal at the 2015 Summer Universiade in addition to a bronze at the 2013 Jeux de la Francophonie.

He is a son of Nadine Auzeil, a former Olympic javelin thrower.

== Competition record ==
Year	Competition	Venue	Position	Event	Notes
Representing France
2011	European U23 Championships	Ostrava, Czech Republic	13th	Decathlon	7435 pts
2013	Jeux de la Francophonie	Nice, France	1st	Decathlon	7789 pts
2015	European Indoor Championships	Prague, Czech Republic	6th	Heptathlon	6011 pts
2015	Universiade	Gwangju, South Korea	2nd	Decathlon	7913 pts
2015	World Championships	Beijing, China	13th	Decathlon	8093 pts
2016	Olympic Games	Rio de Janeiro, Brazil	13th	Decathlon	8064 pts
2017	European Indoor Championships	Belgrade, Serbia	–	Heptathlon	DNF
2017	World Championships	London, United Kingdom	15th	Decathlon	7922 pts

== Personal bests ==
Outdoor

- 100 metres – 11.02 (-0.1 m/s) (Götzis 2015)
- 200 metres – 23.84 (-5.3 m/s) (Grenoble 2012)
- 400 metres – 48.66 (Beijing 2015)
- 1500 metres – 4:37.92 (Beijing 2015)
- 110 metres hurdles – 14.29 (+0.3 m/s) (Roanne 2015)
- High jump – 2.04 (Aubagne 2012)
- Pole vault – 5.10 (Cannes-la-Bocca 2012)
- Long jump – 7.34 (+1.3 m/s) (Nice 2013)
- Triple jump – 12.79 (0.0 m/s) (La Roche-sur-Yon 2008)
- Shot put – 15.90 (Götzis 2015)
- Discus throw – 47.02 (Angers 2016)
- Hammer throw – 48.91 (Aix-les-Bains 2012)
- Javelin throw – 64.41 (Götzis 2015)
- Decathlon – 8191 (Angers 2016)

Indoor

- 60 metres – 7.08 (Prague 2015)
- 1000 metres – 2:46.93 (Prague 2015)
- 60 metres hurdles – 8.10 (Prague 2015)
- High jump – 2.01 (Prague 2015)
- Pole vault – 5.20 (Prague 2015)
- Long jump – 7.39 (Bordeaux 2014)
- Shot put – 15.81 (Bordeaux 2014)
- Heptathlon – 6011 (Prague 2015)
