= 2023 Hypo-Meeting =

- Venue: Mösle Stadium
- Location: Götzis, Austria
- Dates: May 27–May 28
- Website: https://meeting-goetzis.at/en/

Champions
- Men: (Canada) Pierce LePage (8700)
- Women: (United States) Anna Hall (6988)

The 48th edition of the annual Hypo-Meeting took place on May 27 and May 28, 2023, in Götzis, Vorarlberg (Austria). The track and field competition, featuring a men's decathlon and a women's heptathlon event was part of the 2023 World Athletics Combined Events Tour.

== Men's decathlon ==
=== Records ===
World Record	Kevin Mayer (FRA)	9126	16 September 2018	Talence, France
Event Record	Roman Šebrle (CZE)	9026	27 May 2001	Götzis, Austria

=== Results ===
The best mark recorded in each event is highlighted in yellow

Rank	Athlete	Decathlon										Points
Rank	Athlete	100	LJ	SP	HJ	400	110H	DT	PV	JT	1500	Points
1	Pierce LePage (CAN)	10.28	7.57	15.05	2.03	48.01	13.87	49.34	5.00	63.09	4:45.74	8700 WL
2	Damian Warner (CAN)	10.29	7.75	14.92	2.00	47.76	13.60	46.32	4.50	59.92	4:26.16	8619 SB
3	Sander Skotheim (NOR)	10.76	7.60	13.74	2.15	47.64	14.16	43.01	4.90	61.22	4:19.38	8590 PB
4	Karel Tilga (EST)	10.91	7.55	15.82	2.00	48.49	14.65	47.78	4.70	58.45	4:22.30	8403
5	Manuel Eitel (GER)	10.41	7.32	15.28	1.94	48.21	14.29	43.69	4.90	62.32	4:40.17	8351 PB
6	Daniel Golubovic (AUS)	10.98	7.12	14.94	1.97	48.63	14.10	47.25	5.10	57.11	4:30.23	8301 SB
7	Lindon Victor (GRN)	10.69	7.24	16.13	2.00	48.66	15.30	53.27	4.60	64.65	4:52.96	8293 SB
8	Makenson Gletty (FRA)	10.64	6.95	15.87	1.91	48.50	13.94	44.86	4.90	55.99	4:34.98	8211 PB
9	Kendrick Thompson (USA)	10.28	7.48	13.48	2.00	47.22	14.40	41.99	4.50	64.63	4:56.44	8182 PB
10	Fredrik Samuelsson (SWE)	10.97	7.43	14.05	2.00	49.85	14.58	44.45	4.90	63.99	4:36.60	8178 PB
11	Sven Roosen (NED)	10.58	7.15	14.42	1.82	46.83	14.32	43.94	4.70	56.62	4:21.52	8157 PB
12	Jente Hauttekeete (BEL)	10.84	7.36	14.59	2.09	48.96	14.29	40.26	4.80	49.44	4:32.71	8075 PB
13	Finley Gaio (SUI)	10.61	7.62	14.08	1.94	48.12	13.62	41.00	4.70	47.40	4:45.64	8022 PB
14	Cedric Dubler (AUS)	10.87	7.65	12.67	2.03	48.05	14.56	40.60	5.00	51.88	4:43.81	8009 SB
15	Marcel Meyer (GER)	10.91	7.19	14.37	1.91	47.21	14.06	40.93	4.80	47.99	4:27.26	7983 PB
15	Ken Mullings (BAH)	10.60	7.26	14.87	2.06	49.84	13.71	43.64	4.60	56.59	5:17.38	7983 PB
17	Ondrej Kopecký (CZE)	10.91	7.39	13.74	1.94	49.41	14.32	43.19	4.80	54.07	4:41.00	7928 SB
18	Paweł Wiesiołek (POL)	10.87	7.38	14.92	1.97	49.52	14.81	42.46	4.80	51.20	4:47.12	7872 SB
19	Tim Nowak (GER)	11.26	6.93	14.55	1.97	49.26	14.53	35.82	4.70	57.36	4:16.72	7826
20	Edgaras Benkunskas (LTU)	11.11	6.89	14.81	2.09	51.06	14.72	46.71	4.30	63.44	4:59.25	7797 SB
21	Yan C. Hernandez (CUB)	10.60	7.28	12.51	1.97	50.02	14.33	37.13	4.60	53.14	5:16.34	7492
22	Aris-Nikolaos Peristeris (GRE)	11.53	6.90	13.82	1.79	52.92	15.82	44.02	4.80	64.29	4:53.73	7305 SB
	Ashley Moloney (AUS)	10.39	7.60	15.20	1.94	46.46	14.48	40.94	4.40	41.49	DNS	DNF
	Alexandros Spyridonidis (GRE)	10.92	7.18	14.11	1.97	49.77	14.74	43.14	NM	52.75	DNS	DNF
	Devon Williams (USA)	10.77	7.47	14.54	1.85	48.88	14.59	44.37	4.40	54.06	DNS	DNF
	Niels Pittomvils (BEL)	11.13	7.39	15.03	1.91	50.63	14.77	44.94	DNS			DNF
	Nathaniel Mechler (CAN)	10.83	7.07	13.77	1.88	DNS						DNF
	Marcus Nilsson (SWE)	11.20	NM	14.81	1.85	DNS						DNF
	Simon Ehammer (SUI)	10.49	NM	DNS								DNF

== Women's heptathlon ==
=== Records ===
World Record	Jackie Joyner-Kersee (USA)	7291	September 24, 1988	Seoul, South Korea
Event Record	Nafissatou Thiam (BEL)	7013	May 28, 2017	Götzis, Austria

=== Results ===
The best mark recorded in each event is highlighted in yellow

Rank	Athlete	Heptathlon							Points
Rank	Athlete	100H	HJ	SP	200m	LJ	JT	800m	Points
1	Anna Hall (USA)	12.75	1.92	13.90	22.88	6.54	43.08	2:02.97	6988 WL PB
2	Katarina Johnson-Thompson (GBR)	13.88	1.89	13.92	23.26	6.32	44.14	2:21.40	6556 SB
3	Adrianna Sulek (POL)	13.18	1.83	14.44	23.80	6.29	41.83	2:14.33	6480 SB
4	Saga Vanninen (FIN)	13.48	1.80	14.98	24.35	6.43	42.53	2:17.91	6391 PB
5	Sophie Weißenberg (GER)	13.46	1.83	13.25	23.49	6.05	47.73	2:18.22	6375 PB
6	Annie Kunz (USA)	13.19	1.71	13.98	23.82	6.23	46.47	2:17.13	6330 SB
7	Sofie Dokter (NED)	13.51	1.80	13.38	23.68	6.24	43.18	2:16.12	6321 PB
8	Carolin Schäfer (GER)	13.39	1.71	14.44	23.84	6.07	48.02	2:16.82	6312 SB
9	Jana Košcak (CRO)	13.26	1.92	12.42	24.13	6.24	41.03	2:21.20	6293 SB
10	Jade O'Dowda (GBR)	13.70	1.77	13.40	24.44	6.36	41.78	2:11.90	6255 PB
11	Marijke Esselink (NED)	13.55	1.74	14.03	23.88	5.87	46.09	2:14.99	6222 PB
12	Celine Albisser (SUI)	13.27	1.71	13.11	24.00	6.18	36.32	2:12.57	6096 PB
13	Yuliya Loban (UKR)	13.82	1.74	14.83	24.77	6.07	42.28	2:20.41	6065 PB
14	Vanessa Grimm (GER)	13.94	1.71	14.26	24.45	5.90	41.51	2:13.27	6035 SB
15	Isabel Posch (AUT)	13.76	1.62	12.66	23.76	6.43	42.25	2:18.50	6021 PB
16	Paulina Ligarska (POL)	13.87	1.68	13.83	24.38	5.89	41.37	2:11.15	6013 SB
17	Georgia Ellenwood (CAN)	13.88	1.77	12.83	25.00	5.89	45.88	2:17.85	5988 SB
18	Tanielle Crase (AUS)	13.46	1.71	12.22	24.52	6.15	39.33	2:18.41	5925
19	Chiara-Belinda Schuler (AUT)	13.67	1.65	13.71	24.90	6.06	46.94	2:25.12	5916 SB
20	Sandra Röthlin (SUI)	13.63	1.65	12.49	24.86	5.50	41.78	2:14.56	5720 SB
21	Anna-Lena Obermaier (GER)	14.07	1.71	12.64	25.89	5.59	43.00	2:16.30	5671 SB
22	Marys A. Patterson (CUB)	14.89	1.74	12.20	25.18	5.61	40.48	2:16.96	5577 SB
23	Adriana Rodríguez (CUB)	12.97	1.74	13.62	23.78	NM	31.47	2:13.41	5222
	Taliyah Brooks (USA)	12.85	1.74	12.97	23.66	NM	35.75	DNS	DNF
	Sarah Lagger (AUT)	14.18	1.71	14.16	25.33	5.70	44.84	DNS	DNF
	Anouk Vetter (NED)	13.29	1.71	14.88	23.71	DNS			DNF
	Maria Huntington (FIN)	DNF	DNS						DNF
