= 2014 IAAF World Indoor Championships – Men's heptathlon =

The men's Heptathlon at the 2014 IAAF World Indoor Championships took place on 7–8 March 2014.

== Medalists ==
Gold	Silver	Bronze
Ashton Eaton; United States	Andrei Krauchanka; Belarus	Thomas van der Plaetsen; Belgium

== Records ==
Standing records prior to the 2014 IAAF World Indoor Championships
World record	Ashton Eaton (USA)	6645	Istanbul, Turkey	10 March 2012
Championship record	Ashton Eaton (USA)	6645	Istanbul, Turkey	10 March 2012
World Leading	Eelco Sintnicolaas (NED)	6242	Apeldoorn, Netherlands	16 February 2014
African record	Larbi Bourrada (ALG)	5911	Paris, France	28 February 2010
Asian record	Dmitriy Karpov (KAZ)	6229	Tallinn, Estonia	16 February 2008
European record	Roman Šebrle (CZE)	6438	Budapest, Hungary	7 March 2004
North and Central American and Caribbean record	Ashton Eaton (USA)	6645	Istanbul, Turkey	10 March 2012
Oceanian Record	Brent Newdick (AUS)	5758	Tallinn, Estonia	4 February 2012
South American record	Gonzalo Barroilhet (CHI)	5951	Fayetteville, United States	15 March 2008
South American record	Carlos Chinin (BRA)	5951	Tallinn, Estonia	8 February 2014
Records broken during the 2014 IAAF World Indoor Championships
World Leading	Ashton Eaton (USA)	6632	Sopot, Poland	8 March 2014

== Qualification standards ==
Eight athletes were invited by the IAAF in the Heptathlon and in the Pentathlon as follows:

1. the winner of the 2013 Combined Events Challenge
2. the three best athletes from the 2013 Outdoor Lists (as at 31 December 2013), limited to a maximum of one per country
3. the three best athletes from the 2014 Indoor Lists (as at 17 February 2014)
4. one athlete which was invited at the discretion of the IAAF

In total no more than two male and two female athletes from any one Member were invited. Upon refusals or cancellations, the invitations should be extended to the next ranked athletes in the same lists respecting the above conditions.

== Schedule ==
Date	Time	Round
7 March 2014	12:10	60 metres
7 March 2014	13:05	Long jump
7 March 2014	18:30	Shot put
7 March 2014	19:55	High jump
8 March 2014	10:00	60 metres hurdles
8 March 2014	11:00	Pole vault
8 March 2014	19:20	1000 metres
8 March 2014	19:20	Final standings

== Results ==
=== 60 metres ===
Rank	Lane	Name	Nationality	Result	Points	Notes
1	8	Ashton Eaton	United States	6.66	1007	PB
2	3	Damian Warner	Canada	6.75	973	PB
3	1	Oleksiy Kasyanov	Ukraine	6.88	925	SB
4	7	Eelco Sintnicolaas	Netherlands	7.01	879	SB
5	5	Kai Kazmirek	Germany	7.02	875	PB
6	2	Andrei Krauchanka	Belarus	7.12	840	SB
7	6	Thomas van der Plaetsen	Belgium	7.13	837	PB
8	4	Pascal Behrenbruch	Germany	7.23	802	SB

=== Long jump ===
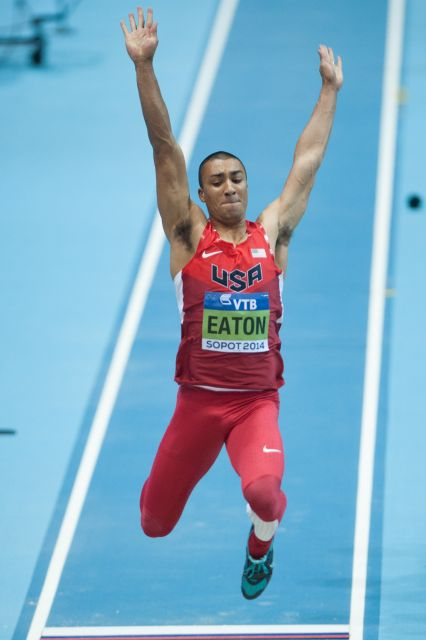
Ashton Eaton competing in the long jump.

Rank	Name	Nationality	#1	#2	#3	Result	Points	Notes	Summary
1	Ashton Eaton	United States	5.90	7.78	7.77	7.78	1005	SB	2012
2	Thomas van der Plaetsen	Belgium	6.08	7.44	7.67	7.67	977		1814
3	Oleksiy Kasyanov	Ukraine	7.38	7.54	7.53	7.54	945		1870
4	Andrei Krauchanka	Belarus	7.31	7.37	7.46	7.46	925		1765
5	Kai Kazmirek	Germany	7.44	7.31	7.38	7.44	920		1795
6	Damian Warner	Canada	6.67	7.27	7.31	7.31	888	SB	1861
7	Eelco Sintnicolaas	Netherlands	7.11	7.14	6.88	7.14	847		1726
8	Pascal Behrenbruch	Germany	6.45	6.83	7.06	7.06	828	SB	1630

=== Shot put ===
Rank	Name	Nationality	#1	#2	#3	Result	Points	Notes	Summary
1	Pascal Behrenbruch	Germany	15.28	15.24	15.50	15.50	820	SB	2450
2	Andrei Krauchanka	Belarus	14.51	14.66	15.42	15.42	816	PB	2581
3	Oleksiy Kasyanov	Ukraine	15.41	14.71	x	15.41	815	SB	2685
4	Ashton Eaton	United States	14.61	14.82	14.88	14.88	782		2794
5	Eelco Sintnicolaas	Netherlands	13.88	14.08	14.39	14.39	752		2478
6	Thomas van der Plaetsen	Belgium	13.95	13.12	14.32	14.32	748	PB	2562
7	Kai Kazmirek	Germany	12.74	14.00	14.06	14.06	732	PB	2527
8	Damian Warner	Canada	13.86	13.72	x	13.86	720	SB	2581

=== High jump ===
Rank	Name	Nationality	1.85	1.88	1.91	1.94	1.97	2.00	2.03	2.06	2.09	2.12	2.15	2.18	2.21	2.24	Result	Points	Notes	Summary
1	Andrei Krauchanka	Belarus	–	–	–	–	o	–	o	o	o	o	o	xo	o	xxx	2.21	1002	CHB	3583
2	Thomas van der Plaetsen	Belgium	–	–	–	–	o	–	o	xxo	xo	o	xxx				2.12	915	SB	3477
3	Ashton Eaton	United States	–	–	o	o	o	o	xxo	o	xxx						2.06	859	SB	3653
4	Oleksiy Kasyanov	Ukraine	–	–	o	–	o	o	xo	xxx							2.03	831		3516
5	Kai Kazmirek	Germany	–	–	o	–	o	o	xxo	xxx							2.03	831		3358
6	Eelco Sintnicolaas	Netherlands	o	–	o	–	xo	xo	xxo	xxx							2.03	831	SB	3309
7	Damian Warner	Canada	o	–	o	o	o	o	xxx								2.00	803	SB	3384
8	Pascal Behrenbruch	Germany	o	o	xxo	o	xxx										1.94	749	SB	3199

=== 60 metres hurdles ===
Rank	Lane	Name	Nationality	Result	Points	Notes	Summary
1	3	Ashton Eaton	United States	7.64	1074	CHB	4727
2	6	Damian Warner	Canada	7.70	1059		4443
3	1	Oleksiy Kasyanov	Ukraine	7.85	1020	PB	4536
4	5	Eelco Sintnicolaas	Netherlands	8.05	969	SB	4278
5	8	Kai Kazmirek	Germany	8.07	964		4322
6	7	Andrei Krauchanka	Belarus	8.10	957	SB	4540
7	2	Thomas van der Plaetsen	Belgium	8.16	942		4419
8	4	Pascal Behrenbruch	Germany	8.19	935		4134

=== Pole vault ===
Rank	Name	Nationality	4.30	4.40	4.50	4.60	4.70	4.80	4.90	5.00	5.10	5.20	5.30	5.40	5.50	5.60	Result	Points	Notes	Summary
1	Eelco Sintnicolaas	Netherlands	–	–	–	–	–	–	–	–	–	o	–	xxo	x–	xx	5.40	1035	SB	5313
2	Thomas van der Plaetsen	Belgium	–	–	–	–	–	–	–	xo	–	xo	xxx				5.20	972		5391
3	Ashton Eaton	United States	–	–	–	–	–	–	o	o	–	xxo	xxx				5.20	972		5699
3	Kai Kazmirek	Germany	–	–	–	o	–	o	–	o	o	xxo	xxx				5.20	972	PB	5294
5	Andrei Krauchanka	Belarus	–	–	–	–	xo	–	o	o	xxx						5.00	910		5450
6	Pascal Behrenbruch	Germany	xxo	–	o	o	xxo	xxo	xxx								4.80	849	SB	4983
7	Damian Warner	Canada	–	–	xo	o	xxx										4.60	790	SB	5233
8	Oleksiy Kasyanov	Ukraine	–	–	o	xxx											4.50	760	SB	5296

=== 1000 metres ===
Rank	Name	Nationality	Result	Points	Notes	Summary
1	Ashton Eaton	United States	2:34.72	933	SB	6632
2	Damian Warner	Canada	2:37.98	896	PB	6129
3	Eelco Sintnicolaas	Netherlands	2:38.98	885	SB	6198
4	Oleksiy Kasyanov	Ukraine	2:39.44	880	NR	6176
5	Kai Kazmirek	Germany	2:39.51	879	PB	6173
6	Thomas van der Plaetsen	Belgium	2:40.50	868	PB	6259
7	Andrei Krauchanka	Belarus	2:41.88	853	SB	6303
	Pascal Behrenbruch	Germany	DNF	0		4983

=== Final standings ===
The highest mark recorded in each event is highlighted in yellow

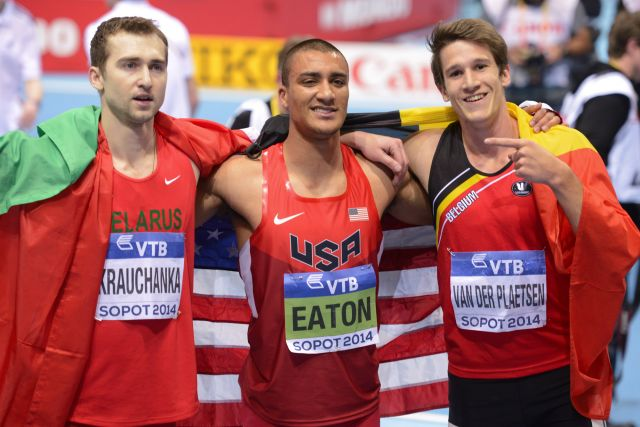
The medalists

Rank	Name	Nationality	60m	LJ	SP	HJ	60m H	PV	1000m	Points	Notes
1st place, gold medalist(s)	Ashton Eaton	United States	6.66	7.78	14.88	2.06	7.64	5.20	2:34.72	6632	WL
2nd place, silver medalist(s)	Andrei Krauchanka	Belarus	7.12	7.46	15.42	2.21	8.10	5.00	2:41.88	6303	NR
3rd place, bronze medalist(s)	Thomas van der Plaetsen	Belgium	7.13	7.67	14.32	2.12	8.16	5.20	2:40.50	6259	NR
4	Eelco Sintnicolaas	Netherlands	7.01	7.14	14.39	2.03	8.05	5.40	2:38.98	6198	
5	Oleksiy Kasyanov	Ukraine	6.88	7.54	15.41	2.03	7.85	4.50	2:39.44	6176	SB
6	Kai Kazmirek	Germany	7.02	7.44	14.06	2.03	8.07	5.20	2:39.51	6173	PB
7	Damian Warner	Canada	6.75	7.31	13.86	2.00	7.70	4.60	2:37.98	6129	PB
8	Pascal Behrenbruch	Germany	7.23	7.06	15.50	1.94	8.19	4.80	DNF	4983	SB
