= Benjamin Gregory (decathlete) =

British decathlete (born 1990)

Benjamin Gregory (born 21 November 1990) is a British decathlete.

In the 2014 Commonwealth Games he represented Wales and placed sixth.
