= Aaron Booth =

New Zealand decathlete (born 1996)

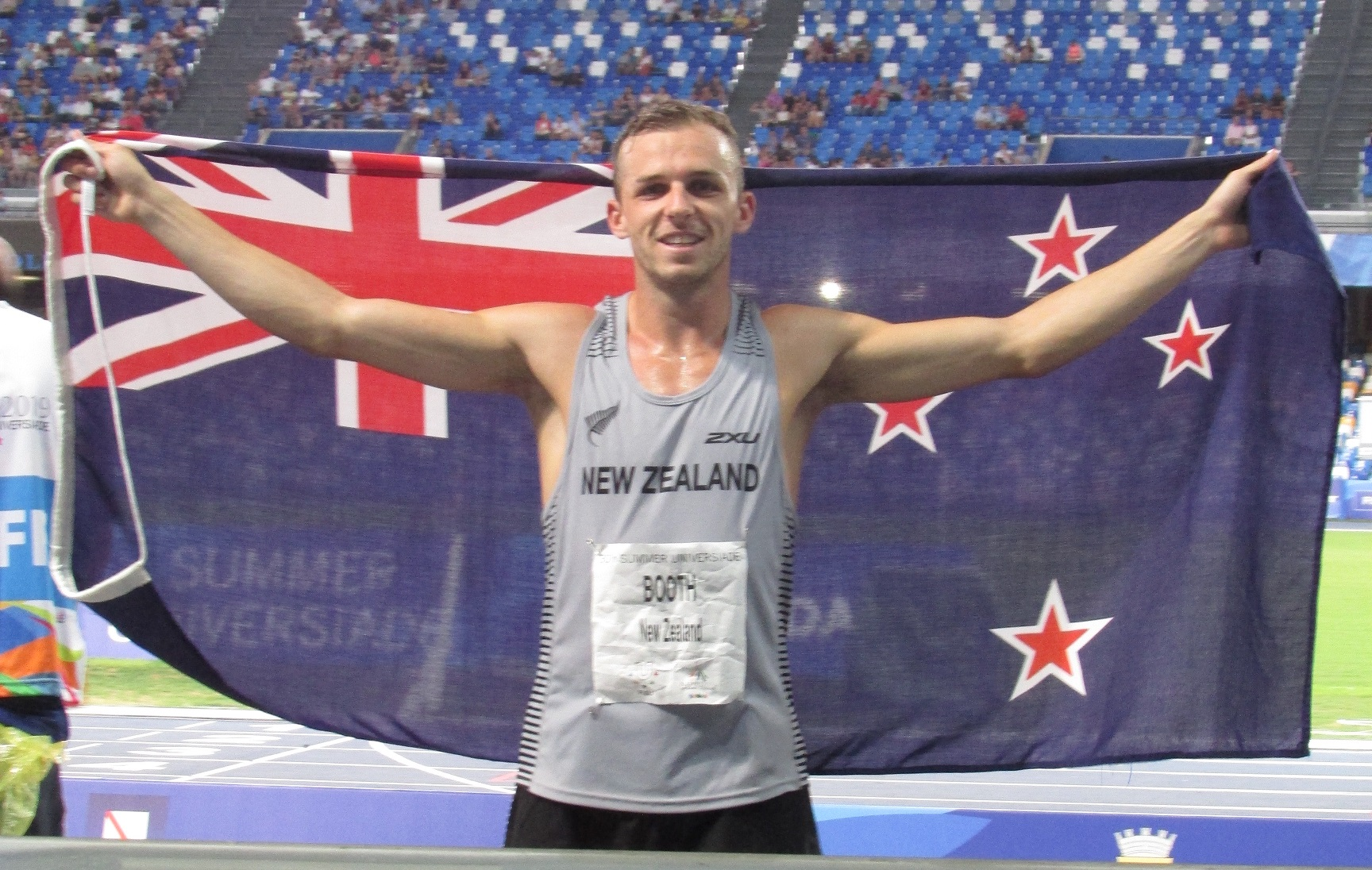
- 2019 Universiade Decathlon Champion

Personal information
- Full name: Aaron James Booth
- Born: 12 September 1996 (age 30) Auckland, New Zealand
- Height: 182 cm (6 ft 0 in)
Medal record
Men's athletics
Representing New Zealand
Summer Universiade
Bronze medal – third place	2017 Taipei	Decathlon
Gold medal – first place	2019 Naples	Decathlon

Aaron James Booth (born 12 September 1996) is a New Zealand decathlete who won the gold medal in that event at the 2019 Summer Universiade.

Booth had been involved with the sport since age 3, and he took up the decathlon after not seeing success in any individual event group. He represented New Zealand at youth and senior level at the Oceania Championships in Tahiti and Cairns, and at senior level at the World University Games in South Korea, Taipei and Naples. He was the 2013 Oceania Octathlon Champion, the 2014 New Zealand Under 20 Decathlon Champion, and the 2015 Australian Under 20 Decathlon Champion.

In 2019 Booth broke the New Zealand indoor Heptathlon record in Fayetteville with a score of 5819 points. He placed 8th at the NCAA Indoor champs in Birmingham Alabama. Booth then placed 6th at the NCAA Outdoor championships with a PB score of 7680 points. At the World University Games in Naples he won the gold medal, adding to his bronze medal from the 2017 games, with another personal best score of 7827 points.

After a Covid interrupted season in 2020 Booth, representing Long Beach State University in California, won the 2021 Big West Outdoor Conference Championships (7520pts) and at the NCAA Championships he broke the school record with a score of 7644pts, finishing in sixth place.

In March 2022 Booth won his first New Zealand Senior Decathlon title.

His best decathlon score of 7827pts at Naples ranks him fourth on the New Zealand decathlon "all time" list.

== Achievements ==
Year	Competition	Venue	Position	Event	Notes
Representing New Zealand
2013	2013 Oceania Youth Athletics Championships	Tahiti	1st	Octathlon	5231pts
Representing Waitakere City Athletics Club
2014	2014 New Zealand Junior Decathlon Championships	Waitakere	1st	Decathlon	6287pts
Representing Auckland Athletics
2015	2015 New Zealand Decathlon Championships	Hamilton	2nd	Decathlon	6983pts
2015	2015 Australian Junior Decathlon Championships	Brisbane	1st	Decathlon	7379pts
2015	2015 NZ Athletic Championships	Wellington	1st	Under 20 4x400	3m 20.28sec
Representing New Zealand
2015	2015 Oceania Area Championships	Cairns	2nd	Decathlon	6183pts
2015	2015 Summer Universiade	Gwangju, South Korea	13th	Decathlon	6905pts
Representing New Zealand
2016	2016 Australian/Oceania Decathlon Championships	Sydney	7th	Decathlon	6721pts
Representing New Zealand
2017	2017 Summer Universiade	Taipei	3rd	Decathlon	7523pts
Representing Kansas State Wildcats
2018	Big 12 Outdoor Championships	Texas	2nd	Decathlon	7508pts
2018	2018 NCAA Division I Outdoor Track and Field Championships	Oregon	14th	Decathlon	7458pts
Representing Kansas State Wildcats
2019	2019 NCAA Division I Indoor Track and Field Championships	Alabama	8th	Heptathlon	5719pts
2019	Big 12 Outdoor Championships	Oklahoma	2nd	Decathlon	7602pts
2019	2019 NCAA Division I Outdoor Track and Field Championships	Texas	6th	Decathlon	7680 pts
Representing New Zealand
2019	2019 Summer Universiade	Naples	1st	Decathlon	7827 pts
Representing Kansas State Wildcats
2020	Big 12 Indoor Championships	Iowa	3rd	Heptathlon	5639pts
2020	2020 NCAA Division I Indoor Track and Field Championships	Albuquerque	CANCELLED	Heptathlon	5639pts (qualifier)
Representing Long Beach State
2021	Big West Outdoor Championships	Irvine, CA	1st	Decathlon	7520pts
2021	2021 NCAA Division I Outdoor Track and Field Championships	Oregon	6th	Decathlon	7644pts
Representing Auckland Athletics
2022	2022 New Zealand Decathlon Championships	Hastings	1st	Decathlon	7337pts

== Personal bests ==
New Zealand Athletics Rankings Auckland Athletics Rankings Tilastopaja Tfrrs

=== Combined events ===
Event	Points	Place	Date
Senior Decathlon	7827 points	Naples	10 July 2019
Junior Decathlon	7379 points	Brisbane	28 March 2015
Youth Decathlon	6058 points	Hastings	10 November 2014
Octathlon	5231 points	Tahiti	5 June 2013

=== Track and field outdoor ===
As of 12 February 2022

Event	Performance	Location	Date	Points
Decathlon	7,827 points	Naples	10 July 2019	7,827 points
100 metres	10.95 (+1.3 m/s)	Norman	11 May 2019	872 points
Long jump	7.22 m (23 ft 8 1/4 in) (+1.5 m/s)	Austin	5 June 2019	866 points
Shot put	13.61 m (44 ft 7 3/4 in)	Irvine	8 May 2021	704 points
High jump	2.03 m (6 ft 7 3/4 in)	Wellington	4 March 2023	831 points
400 metres	49.73	Austin	5 June 2019	827 points
110 metres hurdles	15.26 (3.3 m/s)	Hastings	22 January 2022	818 points
Discus throw	44.63 m (146 ft 5 in)	Hastings	22 January 2022	759 points
Pole vault	4.80 m (15 ft 8 3/4 in)	Naples	10 July 2019	849 points
Javelin throw	62.44 m (204 ft 10 1/4 in)	Sydney	31 March 2017	775 points
1500 metres	4:28.17	Sydney	3 December 2017	757 points
Virtual Best Performance				8,058 points

=== Track and field indoor ===
As of 28/1/2019

Event	Performance	Location	Date
60m	7.07sec	Birmingham, Alabama	8 March 2019
60m hurdles	8.51sec	Manhattan, Kansas	12 December 2018
Long Jump	7.39m	Fayetteville, Arkansas	25 January 2019
Shot Put	14.28m	Fayetteville, Arkansas	25 January 2019
High jump	2.03m	Birmingham, Alabama	9 March 2019
Pole Vault	4.80m	Fayetteville, Arkansas	1 February 2020
1000 m	2:44.64sec	Fayetteville, Arkansas	1 February 2020
Pentathlon	3973 pts	Manhattan, Kansas	7 December 2018
Heptathlon	5819 pts	Fayetteville, Arkansas	26 January 2019
