= Dominik Siedlaczek =

Austrian decathlete (born 1992)

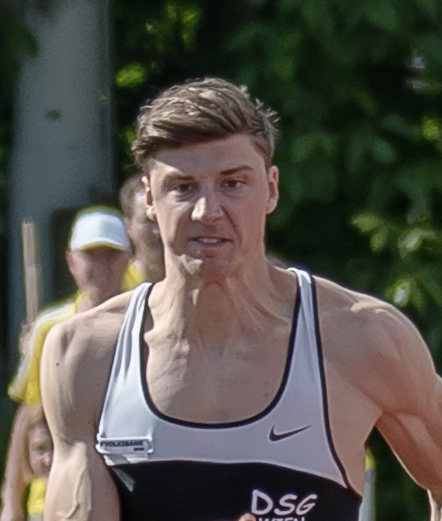
- Siedlaczek in Linz 2017

Personal information
- Nationality: Austrian
- Born: 11 March 1992 (age 34) Vienna, Austria
- Height: 198 cm (6 ft 6 in) (2017)
- Weight: 93 kg (205 lb) (2017)

Sport
- Country: Austria
- Sport: Track & Field
- Event(s): Decathlon, Heptathlon
- Club: DSG Wien

Dominik Siedlaczek (born 11 March 1992) is a former Austrian decathlete.

He won the gold medal in athletics at 2015 European Games in Baku, finishing 1st on 110 metres hurdles, with a personal best of 14.07. In the same year he became 9th in decathlon at the 2015 Summer Universiade in Gwangju. He won several national titles in decathlon, hurdles and high jump. and holds several Viennese records.

== Honours ==
In 2015, Siedlaczek won the Viennese Track & Field Athlete of the year award.

== Retirement ==
In 2018 he retired from professional sports and became a dual career advisor.
