= 2016 Hypo-Meeting =

The 42nd edition of the annual Hypo-Meeting took place on May 28 and May 29, 2016 in Götzis, Austria. The track and field competition, featuring a men's decathlon and a women's heptathlon event was part of the 2016 IAAF World Combined Events Challenge. Damian Warner and Brianne Theisen-Eaton led the men's and women's competition, respectively, after the first day. Warner (8523 points) and Theisen-Eaton (6765 points) were the winners of the events overall.

== Men's Decathlon ==
=== Schedule ===
May 28
1. 100 m
2. Long Jump
3. Shot Put
4. High Jump
5. 400 m

May 29
6. 110 m hurdles
7. Discus Throw
8. Pole Vault
9. Javelin Throw
10. 1,500 m

=== Records ===
World Record	Roman Šebrle (CZE)	9026	May 27, 2001	Götzis, Austria
Event Record	Roman Šebrle (CZE)	9026	May 27, 2001	Götzis, Austria

== Results ==
=== 100 metres ===
Position	Rank	Heat	Athlete	Result	Wind	Points
1	1	6	Damian Warner (CAN)	10.15	1.1	1059
2	2	6	Felipe Dos Santos (BRA)	10.5	1.1	975
3	1	5	Kai Kazmirek (GER)	10.62	1.1	947
4	3	6	Yordani García (CUB)	10.65	1.1	940
5	2	5	Garrett Scantling (USA)	10.66	1.1	938
6	3	5	Dominik Distelberger (AUT)	10.71	1.1	926
7	4	6	Rico Freimuth (GER)	10.71	1.1	926
8	5	6	John Lane (GBR)	10.74	1.1	919
9	1	4	Paweł Wiesiołek (POL)	10.81	1.3	903
10	6	6	Arthur Abele (GER)	10.83	1.1	899
11	2	4	Elmo Savola (FIN)	10.83	1.3	899
12	4	5	Jirí Sýkora (CZE)	10.86	1.1	892
13	5	5	Jeremy Taiwo (USA)	10.89	1.1	885
14	1	2	Kevin Mayer (FRA)	10.92	0.3	878
15	6	5	Jorge Ureña (ESP)	10.93	1.1	876
16	3	4	Adam Sebastian Helcelet (CZE)	10.96	1.3	870
17	1	3	Fredriech Pretorius (RSA)	10.96	0	870
18	2	3	Fredrik Samuelsson (SWE)	10.98	0	865
19	2	2	Jan Deuber (SUI)	11.04	0.3	852
20	4	4	Willem Coertzen (RSA)	11.07	1.3	845
21	3	2	Ashley Bryant (GBR)	11.08	0.3	843
22	1	1	Tim Nowak (GER)	11.09	0.7	841
23	3	3	Pieter Braun (NED)	11.11	0	836
24	4	3	Bastien Auzeil (FRA)	11.14	0	830
25	4	2	Niels Pittomvils (BEL)	11.15	0.3	827
26	2	1	Jonas Fringeli (SUI)	11.17	0.7	823
27	5	3	Jan Felix Knobel (GER)	11.23	0	810
28	3	1	Janek Õiglane (EST)	11.31	0.7	793
29	4	1	Taavi Tšernjavski (EST)	11.46	0.7	761
30	5	2	David Brock (AUS)	11.52	0.3	748
31	-	4	Pelle Rietveld (NED)	DNS	1.3	0

=== Long jump ===
Position	Rank	Group	Athlete	Result	Wind	Points	Overall	Overall Rank
1	1	A	Ashley Bryant (GBR)	7.58	0.8	955	1798	9
2	2	A	Arthur Abele (GER)	7.57	1	952	1851	4
3	3	A	Jorge Ureña (ESP)	7.47	1.6	927	1803	7
4	4	A	Felipe Dos Santos (BRA)	7.46	0.3	925	1900	2
5	5	A	Kai Kazmirek (GER)	7.45	0.6	922	1869	3
6	1	B	Jirí Sýkora (CZE)	7.41	1.6	913	1805	5
7	6	A	Fredrik Samuelsson (decathlete) (SWE)	7.4	-0.3	910	1775	10
8	7	A	Pieter Braun (NED)	7.4	0	910	1746	13
9	8	A	Kevin Mayer (FRA)	7.32	-0.2	891	1769	12
10	9	A	John Lane (GBR)	7.3	1	886	1805	5
11	10	A	Jeremy Taiwo (USA)	7.3	1	886	1771	11
12	11	A	Dominik Distelberger (AUT)	7.25	0.3	874	1800	8
13	2	B	Niels Pittomvils (BEL)	7.24	3	871	1698	17
14	3	B	Adam Sebastian Helcelet (CZE)	7.21	2.6	864	1734	15
15	4	B	Fredriech Pretorius (RSA)	7.13	-0.9	845	1715	16
16	12	A	Willem Coertzen (RSA)	7.12	2.9	842	1687	19
17	13	A	Damian Warner (CAN)	7.12	-0.2	842	1901	1
18	5	B	Jonas Fringeli (SUI)	7.05	1.3	826	1649	22
19	6	B	Janek Õiglane (EST)	7.04	-0.7	823	1616	26
20	7	B	Garrett Scantling (USA)	6.94	-0.7	799	1737	14
21	8	B	Bastien Auzeil (FRA)	6.92	-0.5	795	1625	25
22	9	B	Elmo Savola (FIN)	6.92	3.3	795	1694	18
23	10	B	Jan Deuber (SUI)	6.91	0.3	792	1644	23
24	11	B	Tim Nowak (GER)	6.89	-1.9	788	1629	24
25	14	A	Paweł Wiesiołek (POL)	6.82	0.7	771	1674	20
26	12	B	David Brock (AUS)	6.62	2.3	725	1473	27
27	13	B	Yordani García (CUB)	6.58	2.1	716	1656	21
28	14	B	Taavi Tšernjavski (EST)	6.13	-0.8	615	1376	28
29	0	A	Rico Freimuth (GER)	NM	0	0	926	29
30	0	A	Jan Felix Knobel (GER)	NM	0	0	810	30
31	0	B	Pelle Rietveld (NED)	DNS	0	0	0	31

=== Shot put ===
Position	Rank	Group	Athlete	Result	Points	Overall	Overall Rank
1	1	A	Garrett Scantling (USA)	15.62	828	2565	5
2	2	A	Kevin Mayer (FRA)	15.22	803	2572	4
3	3	A	Jan Felix Knobel (GER)	14.89	783	1593	29
4	4	A	Jeremy Taiwo (USA)	14.84	780	2551	6
5	1	B	Pieter Braun (NED)	14.75	774	2520	8
6	5	A	Damian Warner (CAN)	14.64	768	2669	1
7	6	A	Adam Sebastian Helcelet (CZE)	14.52	760	2494	12
8	7	A	Jirí Sýkora (CZE)	14.19	740	2545	7
9	8	A	Janek Õiglane (EST)	14.12	736	2352	21
10	2	B	David Brock (AUS)	14.11	735	2208	24
11	3	B	Tim Nowak (GER)	14.07	733	2362	19
12	9	A	Kai Kazmirek (GER)	14.05	731	2600	2
13	4	B	Fredrik Samuelsson (decathlete) (SWE)	14.02	730	2505	10
14	5	B	Dominik Distelberger (AUT)	13.76	714	2514	9
15	10	A	Paweł Wiesiołek (POL)	13.74	712	2386	17
16	11	A	Willem Coertzen (RSA)	13.73	712	2399	15
17	6	B	Taavi Tšernjavski (EST)	13.6	704	2080	25
18	7	B	John Lane (GBR)	13.48	697	2502	11
19	12	A	Niels Pittomvils (BEL)	13.4	692	2390	16
20	8	B	Jonas Fringeli (SUI)	13.3	686	2335	22
21	9	B	Ashley Bryant (GBR)	13.28	684	2482	13
22	10	B	Felipe Dos Santos (BRA)	13.27	684	2584	3
23	11	B	Elmo Savola (FIN)	13.01	668	2362	19
24	12	B	Fredriech Pretorius (RSA)	12.88	660	2375	18
25	13	B	Jorge Ureña (ESP)	12.71	650	2453	14
26	14	B	Jan Deuber (SUI)	12.2	619	2263	23
27	-	A	Arthur Abele (GER)	NM	0	1851	26
28	-	A	Bastien Auzeil (FRA)	NM	0	1625	28
29	-	A	Yordani García (CUB)	NM	0	1656	27
30	-	A	Rico Freimuth (GER)	DNS	0	926	30
31	-	B	Pelle Rietveld (NED)	DNS	0	0	31

=== High jump ===
Position	Rank	Group	Athlete	Result	Points	Overall	Overall Rank
1	1	A	Jeremy Taiwo (USA)	2.18	973	3524	1
2	2	A	Kai Kazmirek (GER)	2.06	859	3459	3
3	3	A	Jorge Ureña (ESP)	2.03	831	3284	12
4	4	A	Janek Õiglane (EST)	2.03	831	3183	17
5	5	A	Adam Sebastian Helcelet (CZE)	2	803	3297	10
6	5	A	Damian Warner (CAN)	2	803	3472	2
7	7	A	Kevin Mayer (FRA)	2	803	3375	4
8	8	A	Garrett Scantling (USA)	2	803	3368	5
9	9	A	Paweł Wiesiołek (POL)	2	803	3189	16
10	10	A	Niels Pittomvils (BEL)	2	803	3193	15
11	11	A	Fredrik Samuelsson (decathlete) (SWE)	2	803	3308	9
12	12	A	Pieter Braun (NED)	2	803	3323	8
13	13	A	David Brock (AUS)	2	803	3011	23
14	1	B	Jonas Fringeli (SUI)	2	803	3138	18
15	2	B	Jirí Sýkora (CZE)	2	803	3348	6
16	3	B	Ashley Bryant (GBR)	2	803	3285	11
17	4	B	Elmo Savola (FIN)	1.97	776	3138	18
18	5	B	John Lane (GBR)	1.97	776	3278	13
19	14	A	Felipe Dos Santos (BRA)	1.94	749	3333	7
20	6	B	Tim Nowak (GER)	1.94	749	3111	20
21	7	B	Bastien Auzeil (FRA)	1.94	749	2374	26
22	8	B	Dominik Distelberger (AUT)	1.94	749	3263	14
23	9	B	Fredriech Pretorius (RSA)	1.91	723	3098	21
24	10	B	Jan Deuber (SUI)	1.88	696	2959	24
25	15	A	Willem Coertzen (RSA)	1.85	670	3069	22
26	11	B	Taavi Tšernjavski (EST)	1.85	670	2750	25
27	0	B	Arthur Abele (GER)	DNS	0	1851	27
28	0	A	Yordani García (CUB)	DNS	0	1656	28

=== 400 metres ===
Position	Rank	Group	Athlete	Result	Points	Overall	Overall Rank
1	1	5	Kai Kazmirek (GER)	47.01	958	4417	2
2	2	5	Damian Warner (CAN)	47.13	952	4424	1
3	1	4	Dominik Distelberger (AUT)	48.47	886	4149	10
4	2	4	John Lane (GBR)	48.59	881	4159	9
5	1	2	Jonas Fringeli (SUI)	48.87	867	4005	15
6	3	4	Jirí Sýkora (CZE)	48.97	863	4211	4
7	3	5	Jeremy Taiwo (USA)	49.25	849	4373	3
8	4	5	Pieter Braun (NED)	49.28	848	4171	7
9	5	5	Felipe Dos Santos (BRA)	49.34	845	4178	6
10	1	3	Jorge Ureña (ESP)	49.42	842	4126	11
11	2	3	Ashley Bryant (GBR)	49.54	836	4121	13
12	2	2	Fredriech Pretorius (RSA)	49.57	835	3933	20
13	1	1	Elmo Savola (FIN)	49.83	822	3960	18
14	2	1	Fredrik Samuelsson (decathlete) (SWE)	49.94	817	4125	12
15	3	3	Kevin Mayer (FRA)	50.07	811	4186	5
16	4	3	Niels Pittomvils (BEL)	50.14	808	4001	16
17	4	4	Paweł Wiesiołek (POL)	50.15	808	3997	17
18	3	2	Adam Sebastian Helcelet (CZE)	50.23	804	4101	14
19	4	2	Tim Nowak (GER)	50.29	801	3912	21
20	5	3	Garrett Scantling (USA)	50.38	797	4165	8
21	5	2	Taavi Tšernjavski (EST)	50.64	785	3535	23
22	3	1	Janek Õiglane (EST)	51.27	757	3940	19
23	4	1	David Brock (AUS)	51.43	750	3761	22
24	0	4	Willem Coertzen (RSA)	DNF	0	3069	24
25	0	1	Jan Deuber (SUI)	DNS	0	2959	25

=== 110 metres hurdles ===
Position	Rank	Group	Athlete	Result	Wind	Points	Overall	Overall Rank
1	1	5	Damian Warner (CAN)	13.72	-1.1	1011	5435	1
2	1	4	Kevin Mayer (FRA)	14.06	-0.6	967	5153	4
3	2	4	Garrett Scantling (USA)	14.15	-0.6	955	5120	6
4	2	5	Jorge Ureña (ESP)	14.24	-1.1	944	5070	10
5	3	5	Kai Kazmirek (GER)	14.25	-1.1	942	5359	2
6	1	1	Jirí Sýkora (CZE)	14.36	0	929	5140	5
7	4	5	Felipe Dos Santos (BRA)	14.38	-1.1	926	5104	7
8	3	4	Dominik Distelberger (AUT)	14.45	-0.6	917	5066	11
9	1	3	John Lane (GBR)	14.47	-0.5	915	5074	8
10	2	3	Fredriech Pretorius (RSA)	14.5	-0.5	911	4844	18
11	2	1	Fredrik Samuelsson (decathlete) (SWE)	14.52	0	908	5033	12
12	1	2	Jonas Fringeli (SUI)	14.54	-0.7	906	4911	15
13	5	5	Willem Coertzen (RSA)	14.56	-1.1	903	3972	23
14	4	4	Adam Sebastian Helcelet (CZE)	14.57	-0.6	902	5003	14
15	5	4	Pieter Braun (NED)	14.59	-0.6	900	5071	9
16	3	3	Jeremy Taiwo (USA)	14.69	-0.5	887	5260	3
17	4	3	Ashley Bryant (GBR)	14.7	-0.5	886	5007	13
18	2	2	Niels Pittomvils (BEL)	14.77	-0.7	878	4879	16
19	3	1	Tim Nowak (GER)	14.82	0	871	4783	20
20	5	3	Paweł Wiesiołek (POL)	14.97	-0.5	853	4850	17
21	3	2	Elmo Savola (FIN)	14.98	-0.7	852	4812	19
22	4	2	Janek Õiglane (EST)	15.14	-0.7	833	4773	21
23	4	1	David Brock (AUS)	15.66	0	772	4533	22
24	0	1	Jan Deuber (SUI)	DNS	0	0	2959	25
25	0	2	Taavi Tšernjavski (EST)	DNS	-0.7	0	3535	24

=== Discus throw ===
Position	Rank	Group	Athlete	Result	Points	Overall	Overall Rank
1	1	A	Kevin Mayer (FRA)	48.99	849	6002	3
2	2	A	Damian Warner (CAN)	47.79	824	6259	1
3	3	A	Garrett Scantling (USA)	47.47	818	5938	5
4	4	A	Adam Sebastian Helcelet (CZE)	46.47	797	5800	9
5	5	A	Jirí Sýkora (CZE)	45.21	771	5911	6
6	6	A	Tim Nowak (GER)	45.15	770	5553	17
7	7	A	Pieter Braun (NED)	44.65	760	5831	7
8	8	A	Niels Pittomvils (BEL)	44.43	755	5634	15
9	1	B	Dominik Distelberger (AUT)	43.93	745	5811	8
10	2	B	Elmo Savola (FIN)	43.65	739	5551	18
11	3	B	Ashley Bryant (GBR)	43.48	736	5743	11
12	9	A	Jeremy Taiwo (USA)	42.14	708	5968	4
13	4	B	Jonas Fringeli (SUI)	41.41	693	5604	16
14	10	A	Paweł Wiesiołek (POL)	41.02	685	5535	19
15	5	B	Fredriech Pretorius (RSA)	40.22	669	5513	20
16	11	A	Felipe Dos Santos (BRA)	40.03	665	5769	10
17	12	A	Kai Kazmirek (GER)	39.56	656	6015	2
18	6	B	David Brock (AUS)	39.53	655	5188	22
19	7	B	Fredrik Samuelsson (decathlete) (SWE)	39.2	648	5681	13
20	8	B	Jorge Ureña (ESP)	37.51	614	5684	12
21	9	B	John Lane (GBR)	36.6	596	5670	14
22	10	B	Janek Õiglane (EST)	36.19	588	5361	21
23	0	A	Willem Coertzen (RSA)	DNS	0	3972	23

=== Pole vault ===
Position	Rank	Group	Athlete	Result	Points	Overall	Overall Rank
1	1	A	Niels Pittomvils (BEL)	5.2	972	6606	9
2	2	A	Kevin Mayer (FRA)	5	910	6912	3
3	3	A	Dominik Distelberger (AUT)	5	910	6721	6
4	4	A	Kai Kazmirek (GER)	5	910	6925	2
5	5	A	Garrett Scantling (USA)	4.9	880	6818	5
6	6	A	Jeremy Taiwo (USA)	4.9	880	6848	4
7	7	A	Jonas Fringeli (SUI)	4.8	849	6453	15
8	1	B	Jorge Ureña (ESP)	4.8	849	6533	10
9	2	B	Fredriech Pretorius (RSA)	4.7	819	6332	18
10	8	A	Damian Warner (CAN)	4.7	819	7078	1
11	9	A	Pieter Braun (NED)	4.6	790	6621	8
12	3	B	Jirí Sýkora (CZE)	4.6	790	6701	7
13	4	B	Elmo Savola (FIN)	4.6	790	6341	17
14	5	B	Tim Nowak (GER)	4.6	790	6343	16
15	6	B	Fredrik Samuelsson (decathlete) (SWE)	4.6	790	6471	14
16	7	B	Felipe Dos Santos (BRA)	4.4	731	6500	12
17	10	A	Adam Sebastian Helcelet (CZE)	4.4	731	6531	11
18	8	B	Ashley Bryant (GBR)	4.4	731	6474	13
19	9	B	Paweł Wiesiołek (POL)	4.4	731	6266	19
20	0	B	David Brock (AUS)	NM	0	5188	22
21	0	B	Janek Õiglane (EST)	NM	0	5361	21
22	0	A	John Lane (GBR)	DNS	0	5670	20

=== Javelin throw ===
Position	Rank	Group	Athlete	Result	Points	Overall	Overall Rank
1	1	B	Adam Sebastian Helcelet (CZE)	67.11	845	7376	8
2	1	A	Ashley Bryant (GBR)	66.47	836	7310	10
3	2	B	Kevin Mayer (FRA)	65.77	825	7737	2
4	2	A	Janek Õiglane (EST)	65.02	814	6175	20
5	3	B	Garrett Scantling (USA)	62.22	771	7589	4
6	3	A	Tim Nowak (GER)	60.32	743	7086	16
7	4	B	Dominik Distelberger (AUT)	59.97	737	7458	6
8	5	B	Damian Warner (CAN)	58.72	719	7797	1
9	6	B	Jirí Sýkora (CZE)	58.64	717	7418	7
10	7	B	Niels Pittomvils (BEL)	57.89	706	7312	9
11	8	B	Kai Kazmirek (GER)	57.63	702	7627	3
12	4	A	Elmo Savola (FIN)	57.2	696	7037	17
13	9	B	Pieter Braun (NED)	55.7	673	7294	11
14	5	A	Felipe Dos Santos (BRA)	55.63	672	7172	13
15	10	B	Jorge Ureña (ESP)	55.61	672	7205	12
16	6	A	Fredrik Samuelsson (decathlete) (SWE)	55.51	671	7142	14
17	7	A	Paweł Wiesiołek (POL)	53.6	642	6908	19
18	8	A	Jonas Fringeli (SUI)	53.03	634	7087	15
19	11	B	Jeremy Taiwo (USA)	52.2	621	7469	5
20	12	B	Fredriech Pretorius (RSA)	51.26	607	6939	18
21	9	A	David Brock (AUS)	49.62	583	5771	21

=== 1500 metres ===
Position	Athlete	Result	Points	Overall	Overall Rank
1	Jorge Ureña (ESP)	04:24.6	780	7985	12
2	Jonas Fringeli (SUI)	04:25.4	775	7862	13
3	Pieter Braun (NED)	04:27.1	764	8058	8
4	Tim Nowak (GER)	04:28.8	752	7838	14
5	Ashley Bryant (GBR)	04:29.7	746	8056	9
6	Niels Pittomvils (BEL)	04:30.8	739	8051	10
7	Fredriech Pretorius (RSA)	04:31.3	736	7675	17
8	Jeremy Taiwo (USA)	04:31.6	734	8203	4
9	Damian Warner (CAN)	04:32.8	726	8523	1
10	Dominik Distelberger (AUT)	04:34.2	717	8175	5
11	Kevin Mayer (FRA)	04:35.5	709	8446	2
12	Jirí Sýkora (CZE)	04:36.5	703	8121	6
13	Kai Kazmirek (GER)	04:38.3	691	8318	3
14	Adam Sebastian Helcelet (CZE)	04:41.0	674	8050	11
15	Fredrik Samuelsson (decathlete) (SWE)	04:41.1	673	7815	15
16	David Brock (AUS)	04:46.3	641	6412	20
17	Felipe Dos Santos (BRA)	04:59.0	566	7738	16
18	Elmo Savola (FIN)	05:02.2	547	7584	18
19	Garrett Scantling (USA)	05:07.3	518	8107	7
20	Paweł Wiesiołek (POL)	DNF	0	6908	19
21	Janek Õiglane (EST)	DNS	0	6175	21
