= 2018 European Athletics Championships – Men's decathlon =

Men's decathlon at the 2018 European Athletics Championships
- Venue: Olympic Stadium
- Location: Berlin
- Dates: August 7; August 8
- Competitors: 28 from 17 nations
- Winning points: 8431

Medalists
gold medal	Arthur Abele	Germany
silver medal	Ilya Shkurenyov	Authorised Neutral Athletes
bronze medal	Vitaliy Zhuk	Belarus

The men's decathlon at the 2018 European Athletics Championships took place at the Olympic Stadium on 7 and 8 August, 2018.

== Records ==
Standing records prior to the 2018 European Athletics Championships
World record	Ashton Eaton (USA)	9045 pts	Beijing, China	29 August 2015
European record	Roman Šebrle (CZE)	9026 pts	Götzis, Austria	27 May 2001
Championship record	Daley Thompson (GBR)	8811 pts	Stuttgart, West Germany	28 August 1986
World Leading	Damian Warner (CAN)	8795 pts	Götzis, Austria	27 May 2018
European Leading	Maicel Uibo (EST)	8514 pts	Götzis, Austria	27 May 2018

== Schedule ==
All times are Brasilia Time (UTC-3)

Date	Time	Round
7 August 2018	09:30; 10:30; 11:50; 18:30; 21:00	100 metres Long jump Shot put High jump 400 metres
8 August 2018	09:35; 10:20; 13:15; 17:50; 21:35	110 metres hurdles Discus throw Pole vault Javelin throw 1500 metres

All times are local times (UTC+2)

== Results ==
=== 100 metres ===
Rank	Heat	Name	Nationality	Time	Notes	Points
1	4	Kevin Mayer	France	10.64	PB	942
2	4	Tim Duckworth	Great Britain	10.65		940
3	4	Karl Robert Saluri	Estonia	10.68		933
4	4	Arthur Abele	Germany	10.86		892
5	3	Ruben Gado	France	10.86	SB	892
5	4	Martin Roe	Norway	10.86		892
7	2	Jorge Ureña	Spain	10.87		890
8	4	Simone Cairoli	Italy	10.94		874
9	3	Paweł Wiesiołek	Poland	10.95	SB	872
10	3	Yury Yaremich	Belarus	10.96	=SB	870
11	3	Maksim Andraloits	Belarus	11.00		861
11	4	Dominik Distelberger	Austria	11.00		861
13	3	Eelco Sintnicolaas	Netherlands	11.04		852
14	3	Fredrik Samuelsson	Sweden	11.04		852
15	3	Mathias Brugger	Germany	11.05		850
15	2	Elmo Savola	Finland	11.05		850
17	2	Jan Doležal	Czech Republic	11.06	=SB	847
18	1	Vitali Zhuk	Belarus	11.12		834
19	2	Marek Lukáš	Czech Republic	11.12		834
20	1	Ilya Shkurenyov	Authorised Neutral Athletes	11.12		834
21	2	Romain Martin	France	11.16		825
22	2	Karel Tilga	Estonia	11.26		804
23	2	Maicel Uibo	Estonia	11.31		793
24	1	Pieter Braun	Netherlands	11.33		789
25	1	Niklas Kaul	Germany	11.36		782
26	1	Marcus Nilsson	Sweden	11.37		780
27	1	Thomas Van der Plaetsen	Belgium	11.48		757
28	1	Darko Pešić	Montenegro	11.68		715

=== Long jump ===
Rank	Group	Name	Nationality	#1	#2	#3	Result	Notes	Points	Total
1	A	Martin Roe	Norway	7.61	x	–	7.61	PB	962	1854
2	A	Tim Duckworth	Great Britain	x	7.57	–	7.57		952	1892
3	A	Ilya Shkurenyov	Authorised Neutral Athletes	7.38	7.48	7.55	7.55	SB	947	1781
4	A	Yury Yaremich	Belarus	7.30	7.28	7.55	7.55		947	1817
5	A	Pieter Braun	Netherlands	7.52	7.46	x	7.52		940	1729
6	A	Fredrik Samuelsson	Sweden	7.04	7.22	7.52	7.52	SB	940	1792
7	A	Karl Robert Saluri	Estonia	7.50	x	7.50	7.50		935	1868
8	B	Simone Cairoli	Italy	6.99	7.49	–	7.49	PB	932	1806
9	B	Arthur Abele	Germany	7.42	–	–	7.42	SB	915	1807
10	A	Thomas Van der Plaetsen	Belgium	7.41	7.34	–	7.41		913	1670
11	A	Maicel Uibo	Estonia	7.27	x	x	7.27		878	1671
12	B	Karel Tilga	Estonia	7.25	7.19	x	7.25		874	1678
13	A	Jorge Ureña	Spain	x	7.16	7.24	7.24		871	1761
14	B	Niklas Kaul	Germany	7.14	7.20	–	7.20		862	1644
15	B	Dominik Distelberger	Austria	x	x	7.16	7.16		852	1713
16	B	Eelco Sintnicolaas	Netherlands	x	7.10	7.13	7.13		845	1697
17	B	Marcus Nilsson	Sweden	6.83	x	7.13	7.13	PB	845	1625
18	B	Jan Doležal	Czech Republic	6.91	7.12	7.08	7.12		842	1689
19	B	Vitali Zhuk	Belarus	6.70	7.05	x	7.05		826	1660
20	B	Marek Lukáš	Czech Republic	6.93	6.99	x	6.99	SB	811	1645
21	A	Maksim Andraloits	Belarus	6.97	x	6.84	6.97		807	1668
22	B	Elmo Savola	Finland	6.84	6.93	6.71	6.93		797	1647
23	A	Paweł Wiesiołek	Poland	x	x	6.93	6.93		797	1669
24	B	Darko Pešić	Montenegro	x	6.58	x	6.58		716	1431
	B	Mathias Brugger	Germany	x	x	x	NM		0	850
	A	Ruben Gado	France	x	x	x	NM		0	892
	B	Romain Martin	France	x	x	x	NM		0	825
	A	Kevin Mayer	France	x	x	x	NM		0	942

=== Shot put ===
Rank	Group	Name	Nationality	#1	#2	#3	Result	Notes	Points	Total
1	A	Mathias Brugger	Germany	15.01	14.96	15.92	15.92	PB	846	1696
2	A	Vitali Zhuk	Belarus	15.30	15.19	15.65	15.65	PB	830	2490
3	A	Arthur Abele	Germany	15.64	15.01	–	15.64		829	2636
4	A	Martin Roe	Norway	15.48	15.39	x	15.48	SB	819	2673
5	A	Maksim Andraloits	Belarus	14.64	15.33	x	15.33	PB	810	2478
6	A	Darko Pešić	Montenegro	14.45	14.97	14.91	14.97		788	2219
7	A	Maicel Uibo	Estonia	14.01	14.50	14.61	14.61		766	2437
8	B	Karl Robert Saluri	Estonia	14.54	14.14	14.06	14.54	PB	761	2629
9	A	Pieter Braun	Netherlands	12.28	14.20	14.22	14.22		742	2471
10	A	Karel Tilga	Estonia	13.60	14.20	x	14.20		741	2419
11	B	Eelco Sintnicolaas	Netherlands	14.06	13.73	x	14.06		732	2429
12	A	Marek Lukáš	Czech Republic	13.64	13.88	14.04	14.04		731	2376
13	A	Jan Doležal	Czech Republic	14.03	13.89	13.88	14.03		730	2419
14	B	Fredrik Samuelsson	Sweden	13.99	13.73	x	13.99		728	2520
15	A	Marcus Nilsson	Sweden	13.79	13.90	x	13.90		722	2347
16	B	Niklas Kaul	Germany	13.71	13.53	13.85	13.85		719	2363
17	A	Romain Martin	France	13.74	13.76	x	13.76		714	1539
18	B	Tim Duckworth	Great Britain	11.50	13.61	x	13.61		704	2596
19	B	Jorge Ureña	Spain	13.29	x	13.58	13.58		703	2464
20	B	Ilya Shkurenyov	Authorised Neutral Athletes	13.36	13.43	13.28	13.43		693	2474
21	B	Elmo Savola	Finland	13.41	x	13.38	13.41		692	2339
22	B	Ruben Gado	France	13.40	x	13.02	13.40		692	1584
23	B	Thomas Van der Plaetsen	Belgium	13.35	x	x	13.35		689	2359
24	B	Simone Cairoli	Italy	11.88	13.25	x	13.25		682	2488
25	B	Yury Yaremich	Belarus	12.89	12.77	x	12.89		661	2478
26	B	Paweł Wiesiołek	Poland	x	12.79	x	12.79		654	2323
27	B	Dominik Distelberger	Austria	12.60	x	x	12.60		643	2356
	A	Kevin Mayer	France				DNS			

=== High jump ===
Rank	Group	Name	Nationality	1.81	1.84	1.87	1.90	1.93	1.96	1.99	2.02	2.05	2.08	2.11	2.14	2.17	2.20	Result	Points	Notes	Total
1	A	Tim Duckworth	Great Britain	–	–	–	–	–	–	–	o	o	xo	o	o	xo	xr	2.17	963	PB	3559
2	A	Niklas Kaul	Germany	–	–	–	–	–	o	o	o	xxo	xo	xr				2.08	878		3241
3	A	Fredrik Samuelsson	Sweden	–	–	–	o	–	o	o	o	xxo	xxo	xxx				2.08	878	PB	3398
4	A	Thomas Van der Plaetsen	Belgium	–	–	–	–	–	o	–	xo	o	xxx					2.05	850		3209
5	A	Simone Cairoli	Italy	–	–	–	o	–	o	–	o	xo	xxx					2.05	850	SB	3338
6	A	Maicel Uibo	Estonia	–	–	–	–	–	–	–	o	–	xxx					2.02	822		3259
6	A	Jorge Ureña	Spain	–	–	o	–	o	–	o	o	xxx						2.02	822	SB	3286
8	A	Maksim Andraloits	Belarus	–	–	–	xo	o	o	o	o	xxx						2.02	822		3300
8	A	Romain Martin	France	–	–	–	xo	–	o	o	o	xxx						2.02	822		2361
10	A	Karel Tilga	Estonia	–	–	–	–	xo	–	xo	o	xxx						2.02	822		3241
11	A	Ilya Shkurenyov	Authorised Neutral Athletes	–	–	–	–	xo	o	o	xo	xxx						2.02	822	SB	3296
12	A	Jan Doležal	Czech Republic	–	–	–	o	o	o	o	xxo	xxx						2.02	822	PB	3241
13	A	Yury Yaremich	Belarus	–	–	o	o	o	xo	o	xxo	xxx						2.02	822		3300
14	B	Pieter Braun	Netherlands	–	–	–	o	xo	o	xo	xxo	xxx						2.02	822	SB	3293
15	B	Marcus Nilsson	Sweden	–	–	o	o	o	o	o	xxx							1.99	794	SB	3141
16	B	Vitali Zhuk	Belarus	–	o	o	o	xo	xxo	o	xxx							1.99	794	SB	3284
17	B	Elmo Savola	Finland	–	o	o	o	o	xxo	xo	xxx							1.99	794	=PB	3133
18	B	Mathias Brugger	Germany	–	–	–	–	xo	o	xxx								1.96	767		2463
19	B	Martin Roe	Norway	–	o	o	o	xxo	xo	r								1.96	767	=PB	3440
20	B	Ruben Gado	France	–	o	xo	o	xxo	xxo	xxx								1.96	767		2351
21	B	Paweł Wiesiołek	Poland	–	–	o	o	o	xxx									1.93	740		3063
22	B	Arthur Abele	Germany	–	o	o	xo	xo	xxx									1.93	740	SB	3376
23	B	Dominik Distelberger	Austria	–	o	o	o	xxx										1.90	714		3070
24	B	Darko Pešić	Montenegro	o	xxo	–	xo	x–	r									1.90	714		2933
25	B	Karl Robert Saluri	Estonia	o	o	o	xxx											1.87	687		3316
26	B	Marek Lukáš	Czech Republic	xo	o	o	xxx											1.87	687		3063
27	B	Eelco Sintnicolaas	Netherlands	o	–	xxx												1.81	636		3065
	A	Kevin Mayer	France															DNS			

=== 400 metres ===
Rank	Heat	Name	Nationality	Time	Notes	Points	Total
1	4	Ruben Gado	France	47.65	PB	926	3277
2	4	Mathias Brugger	Germany	47.86	SB	916	3379
3	4	Arthur Abele	Germany	48.01	SB	909	4285
4	4	Karl Robert Saluri	Estonia	48.26		897	4213
5	4	Vitali Zhuk	Belarus	48.41	PB	889	4173
6	3	Jorge Ureña	Spain	48.50	PB	885	4171
7	3	Pieter Braun	Netherlands	48.52	SB	884	4177
8	2	Maksim Andraloits	Belarus	48.56	PB	882	4182
9	3	Simone Cairoli	Italy	48.77	PB	872	4210
10	2	Dominik Distelberger	Austria	48.89		866	3936
11	3	Ilya Shkurenyov	Authorised Neutral Athletes	48.95	SB	864	4160
12	4	Niklas Kaul	Germany	49.28		848	4089
13	1	Jan Doležal	Czech Republic	49.42	PB	842	4083
14	2	Martin Roe	Norway	49.42	SB	842	4282
15	3	Elmo Savola	Finland	49.54	SB	836	3969
16	2	Romain Martin	France	49.60	=SB	833	3194
17	2	Fredrik Samuelsson	Sweden	49.60	SB	833	4231
18	3	Paweł Wiesiołek	Poland	49.75		826	3889
19	4	Tim Duckworth	Great Britain	49.87		821	4380
20	1	Yury Yaremich	Belarus	50.03	SB	813	4113
21	2	Karel Tilga	Estonia	50.12		809	4050
22	1	Maicel Uibo	Estonia	50.18	PB	806	4065
23	1	Marek Lukáš	Czech Republic	50.60	SB	787	3850
24	1	Marcus Nilsson	Sweden	51.07		766	3907
	1	Darko Pešić	Montenegro	DNS			
	3	Eelco Sintnicolaas	Netherlands	DNS			
	2	Thomas Van der Plaetsen	Belgium	DNS			

=== 110 metres hurdles ===
Rank	Heat	Name	Nationality	Time	Notes	Points	Total
1	3	Arthur Abele	Germany	13.94	SB	982	5267
2	3	Jorge Ureña	Spain	14.39		925	5096
3	2	Ilya Shkurenyov	Authorised Neutral Athletes	14.44	=SB	918	5078
4	3	Tim Duckworth	Great Britain	14.55		905	5285
5	3	Pieter Braun	Netherlands	14.56		903	5080
6	2	Maicel Uibo	Estonia	14.57		902	4967
7	3	Jan Doležal	Czech Republic	14.58		901	4984
8	1	Dominik Distelberger	Austria	14.61	SB	897	4833
9	3	Mathias Brugger	Germany	14.63		895	4274
10	1	Vitali Zhuk	Belarus	14.66	SB	891	5064
11	2	Simone Cairoli	Italy	14.66	=SB	891	5101
12	2	Marek Lukáš	Czech Republic	14.67		890	4740
13	3	Fredrik Samuelsson	Sweden	14.70		886	5117
14	2	Romain Martin	France	14.72		884	4078
15	2	Marcus Nilsson	Sweden	14.73		882	4789
16	3	Yury Yaremich	Belarus	14.74		881	4994
17	2	Niklas Kaul	Germany	14.78		876	4965
18	2	Elmo Savola	Finland	14.87		865	4834
19	1	Paweł Wiesiołek	Poland	15.10		837	4726
20	1	Ruben Gado	France	15.18		828	4105
21	1	Karl Robert Saluri	Estonia	15.20		825	5038
22	1	Karel Tilga	Estonia	15.27		817	4867
23	1	Martin Roe	Norway	15.31		812	5094
	1	Maksim Andraloits	Belarus	DNF		0	4182

=== Discus throw ===
Rank	Group	Name	Nationality	#1	#2	#3	Result	Notes	Points	Total
1	B	Niklas Kaul	Germany	44.10	43.52	46.30	46.30	PB	794	5759
2	B	Jan Doležal	Czech Republic	42.42	45.81	x	45.81		784	5768
3	B	Paweł Wiesiołek	Poland	43.84	45.68	x	45.68		781	5507
4	A	Ilya Shkurenyov	Authorised Neutral Athletes	45.53	x	43.13	45.53	SB	778	5856
5	B	Vitali Zhuk	Belarus	x	42.38	45.46	45.46		776	5840
6	A	Arthur Abele	Germany	40.46	45.42	44.20	45.42	SB	775	6042
7	A	Maicel Uibo	Estonia	45.33	43.77	43.55	45.33		774	5741
8	A	Marcus Nilsson	Sweden	44.73	43.78	43.84	44.73		761	5550
9	A	Fredrik Samuelsson	Sweden	41.73	43.75	43.94	43.94	SB	745	5862
10	A	Pieter Braun	Netherlands	37.49	43.75	x	43.75		741	5821
11	B	Dominik Distelberger	Austria	x	42.16	43.66	43.66	SB	739	5572
12	B	Karel Tilga	Estonia	43.42	x	42.37	43.42		734	5601
13	B	Elmo Savola	Finland	42.62	42.80	42.92	42.92	SB	724	5558
14	B	Martin Roe	Norway	x	42.22	x	42.22		710	5804
15	A	Tim Duckworth	Great Britain	40.86	40.27	41.94	41.94		704	5989
16	A	Maksim Andraloits	Belarus	41.02	x	40.45	41.02		685	4867
17	A	Yury Yaremich	Belarus	38.96	38.55	39.97	39.97	PB	664	5658
18	A	Romain Martin	France	37.19	39.57	x	39.57	=SB	656	4734
19	B	Marek Lukáš	Czech Republic	38.77	37.74	39.41	39.41		653	5393
20	A	Jorge Ureña	Spain	37.02	x	x	37.02		604	5700
21	A	Ruben Gado	France	35.74	x	x	35.74		579	4684
22	B	Simone Cairoli	Italy	x	35.30	x	35.30		570	5671
	B	Karl Robert Saluri	Estonia	x	x	x	NM		0	5038
	B	Mathias Brugger	Germany				DNS			

=== Pole vault ===
Rank	Group	Name	Nationality	4.20	4.30	4.40	4.50	4.60	4.70	4.80	4.90	5.00	5.10	5.20	5.30	5.40	Result	Points	Notes	Total
1	A	Ilya Shkurenyov	Authorised Neutral Athletes	–	–	–	–	xo	–	xo	–	xo	o	xo	xo	xxx	5.30	1004	SB	6860
2	A	Ruben Gado	France	–	–	–	–	–	–	–	–	xo	o	o	xxx		5.20	972	=SB	5656
3	A	Tim Duckworth	Great Britain	–	–	–	–	–	o	o	o	o	o	xxx			5.10	941		6930
4	A	Maicel Uibo	Estonia	–	–	–	–	–	–	–	–	xxo	o	xr			5.10	941		6682
5	A	Romain Martin	France	–	–	–	–	o	–	xxo	–	xxo	xxo	xr			5.10	941	=PB	5675
6	B	Vitali Zhuk	Belarus	–	–	–	xo	o	o	o	xo	xxx					4.90	880	PB	6720
7	A	Yury Yaremich	Belarus	–	–	–	–	–	–	xo	xxo	xxx					4.90	880		6538
8	B	Jan Doležal	Czech Republic	–	–	–	o	o	o	xxo	xxx						4.80	849		6617
9	B	Martin Roe	Norway	–	o	–	o	xo	o	xxo	xxx						4.80	849	=PB	6653
10	B	Elmo Savola	Finland	–	–	o	xo	xo	o	xxo	xxx						4.80	849	PB	6407
11	B	Paweł Wiesiołek	Poland	–	–	o	–	xo	o	xxx							4.70	819		6326
12	B	Niklas Kaul	Germany	–	–	–	o	o	xxo	r							4.70	819	=SB	6578
13	A	Arthur Abele	Germany	–	–	–	–	o	–	xxx							4.60	790		6832
13	B	Dominik Distelberger	Austria	–	–	–	–	o	–	xxx							4.60	790		6362
13	B	Marek Lukáš	Czech Republic	–	–	o	o	o	xxx								4.60	790		6183
13	A	Marcus Nilsson	Sweden	–	–	–	o	o	xxx								4.60	790		6340
17	B	Simone Cairoli	Italy	o	–	o	xxo	o	xxx								4.60	790	PB	6461
18	A	Pieter Braun	Netherlands	–	–	–	–	xo	–	xxx							4.60	790		6611
19	A	Fredrik Samuelsson	Sweden	–	–	–	o	–	xxx								4.50	760		6622
	A	Jorge Ureña	Spain	–	–	–	–	xxx									NM	0		5700
	A	Maksim Andraloits	Belarus														DNS			
	B	Mathias Brugger	Germany														DNS			
	B	Karl Robert Saluri	Estonia														DNS			
	B	Karel Tilga	Estonia														DNS			

=== Javelin throw ===
Rank	Group	Name	Nationality	#1	#2	#3	Result	Notes	Points	Total
1	B	Arthur Abele	Germany	68.10	65.22	63.27	68.10	SB	860	7692
2	A	Niklas Kaul	Germany	65.31	67.72	x	67.72		855	7433
3	B	Vitali Zhuk	Belarus	64.62	66.19	61.58	66.19	PB	831	7551
4	B	Martin Roe	Norway	58.38	59.22	64.53	64.53		806	7459
5	A	Marek Lukáš	Czech Republic	63.20	57.84	64.19	64.19		801	6984
6	B	Jan Doležal	Czech Republic	60.24	62.67	58.85	62.67	PB	778	7395
7	A	Jorge Ureña	Spain	49.93	61.39	56.89	61.39	SB	759	6459
8	A	Romain Martin	France	59.22	59.11	60.49	60.49	SB	745	6420
9	A	Marcus Nilsson	Sweden	59.50	57.02	59.67	59.67		733	7073
10	A	Simone Cairoli	Italy	50.52	54.32	59.62	59.62	PB	732	7193
11	B	Pieter Braun	Netherlands	56.07	55.68	59.53	59.53		731	7342
12	B	Ilya Shkurenyov	Authorised Neutral Athletes	55.78	59.13	57.48	59.13	SB	725	7585
13	A	Yury Yaremich	Belarus	54.75	58.61	59.12	59.12		725	7263
14	B	Elmo Savola	Finland	x	x	57.12	57.12		695	7102
15	B	Fredrik Samuelsson	Sweden	x	53.61	56.91	56.91		691	7313
16	A	Ruben Gado	France	53.54	53.41	56.17	56.17		680	6336
17	A	Paweł Wiesiołek	Poland	53.90	55.57	53.47	55.57		671	6997
18	B	Tim Duckworth	Great Britain	x	51.60	54.78	54.78		660	7590
19	A	Dominik Distelberger	Austria	53.00	54.43	54.24	54.43	SB	654	7016
	B	Maicel Uibo	Estonia				DNS			

=== 1500 metres ===
Rank	Name	Nationality	Time	Notes	Points	Total
1	Ruben Gado	France	4:21.49		801	7137
2	Niklas Kaul	Germany	4:23.67	SB	787	8220
3	Pieter Braun	Netherlands	4:27.20		763	8105
4	Simone Cairoli	Italy	4:28.30		756	7949
5	Jorge Ureña	Spain	4:29.26	SB	749	7208
6	Marcus Nilsson	Sweden	4:29.86		746	7819
7	Vitali Zhuk	Belarus	4:30.81		739	8290
8	Arthur Abele	Germany	4:30.84		739	8431
9	Ilya Shkurenyov	Authorised Neutral Athletes	4:31.38	SB	736	8321
10	Paweł Wiesiołek	Poland	4:37.03	SB	699	7696
11	Marek Lukáš	Czech Republic	4:37.03	SB	699	7683
12	Fredrik Samuelsson	Sweden	4:38.10	SB	692	8005
13	Jan Doležal	Czech Republic	4:41.27	PB	672	8067
14	Martin Roe	Norway	4:41.40		672	8131
15	Yury Yaremich	Belarus	4:51.10	SB	612	7875
16	Romain Martin	France	4:52.79		602	7022
17	Tim Duckworth	Great Britain	4:58.28	PB	570	8160
18	Elmo Savola	Finland	5:01.22		553	7655
	Dominik Distelberger	Austria	DNS			

== Final standings ==
Rank	Name	Country	Points	Notes
1st place, gold medalist(s)	Arthur Abele	Germany	8431	
2nd place, silver medalist(s)	Ilya Shkurenyov	Authorised Neutral Athletes	8321	SB
3rd place, bronze medalist(s)	Vitali Zhuk	Belarus	8290	PB
4	Niklas Kaul	Germany	8220	PB
5	Tim Duckworth	Great Britain	8160	
6	Martin Roe	Norway	8131	
7	Pieter Braun	Netherlands	8105	
8	Jan Doležal	Czech Republic	8067	PB
9	Fredrik Samuelsson	Sweden	8005	
10	Simone Cairoli	Italy	7949	PB
11	Yury Yaremich	Belarus	7875	
12	Marcus Nilsson	Sweden	7819	
13	Paweł Wiesiołek	Poland	7696	
14	Marek Lukáš	Czech Republic	7683	
15	Elmo Savola	Finland	7655	
16	Jorge Ureña	Spain	7208	
17	Ruben Gado	France	7137	
18	Romain Martin	France	7022	
	Dominik Distelberger	Austria	DNF	
	Maicel Uibo	Estonia	DNF	
	Maksim Andraloits	Belarus	DNF	
	Karl Robert Saluri	Estonia	DNF	
	Karel Tilga	Estonia	DNF	
	Mathias Brugger	Germany	DNF	
	Darko Pešić	Montenegro	DNF	
	Eelco Sintnicolaas	Netherlands	DNF	
	Thomas Van der Plaetsen	Belgium	DNF	
	Kevin Mayer	France	DNF	
