= Athletics at the 2016 Summer Olympics – Men's decathlon =

Men's decathlon at the Games of the XXXI Olympiad
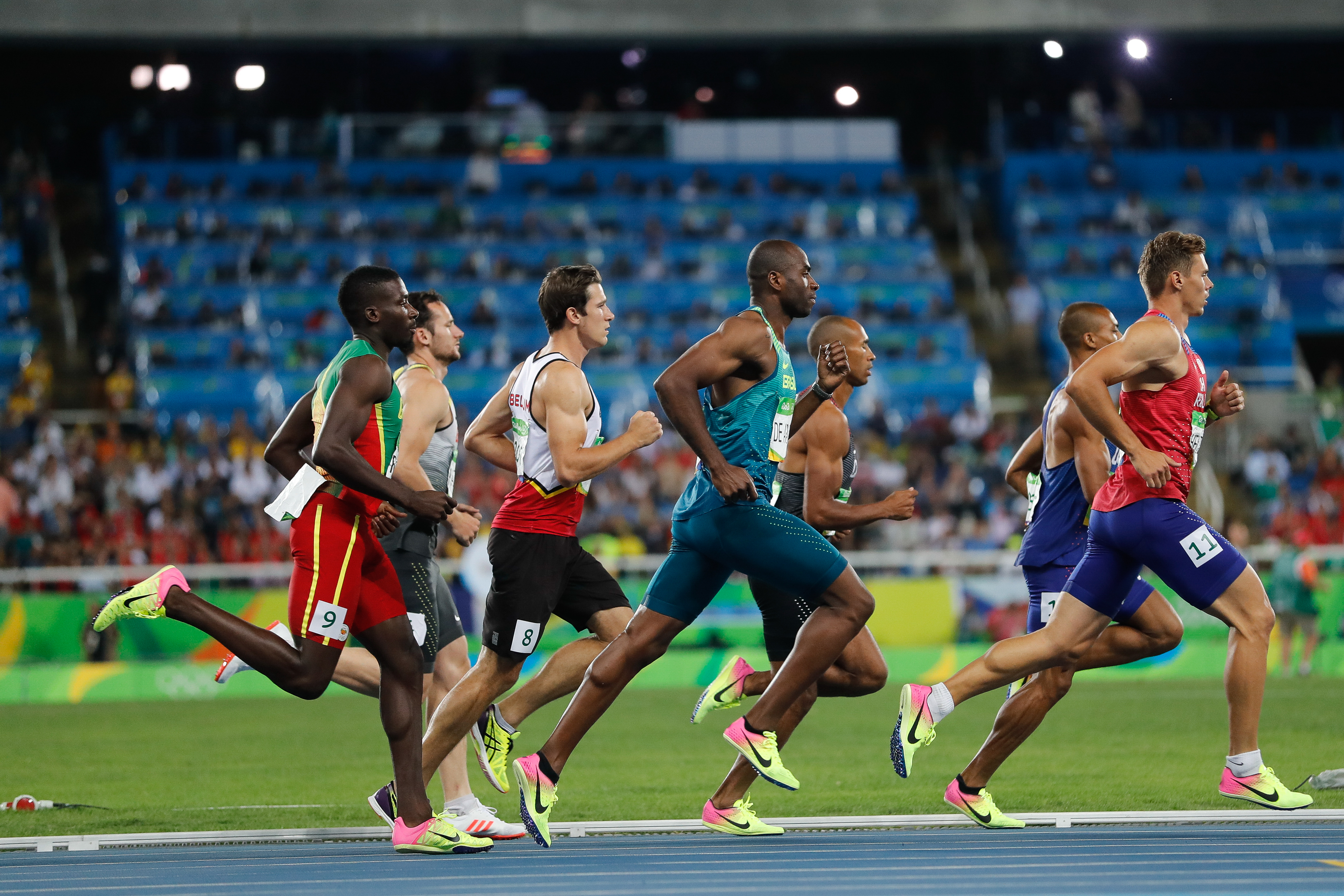
- From L-R: Kurt Felix, Kai Kazmirek, Thomas Van der Plaetsen, Luiz Alberto de Araújo, Damian Warner, Ashton Eaton and Adam Helcelet in the second heat of the 1500 metres, the final event of the decathlon
- Venue: Olympic Stadium
- Date: 17–18 August 2016
- Competitors: 32 from 21 nations
- Winning points: 8893 OR

Medalists
1st place, gold medalist(s)		Ashton Eaton	United States
2nd place, silver medalist(s)		Kevin Mayer	France
3rd place, bronze medalist(s)		Damian Warner	Canada

The men's decathlon competition at the 2016 Summer Olympics in Rio de Janeiro, Brazil. The event was held at the Olympic Stadium between 17 and 18 August.

The medals were presented by Dagmawit Girmay Berhane, IOC member, Ethiopia and Bernard Amsalem, Council Member of the IAAF.

== Competition format ==
The decathlon consists of ten track and field events, with a points system that awards higher scores for better results in each of the ten components. The athletes all compete in one competition with no elimination rounds.

== Schedule ==
All times are Brasilia Time (UTC-3)

Date	Time	Round
Wednesday, 17 August 2016	09:30; 10:35; 12:15; 17:45; 21:30	100 metres Long jump Shot put High jump 400 metres
Thursday, 18 August 2016	09:30; 10:25; 13:25; 18:35; 21:45	110 metres hurdles Discus throw Pole vault Javelin throw 1500 metres

== Records ==
Prior to the competition, the existing World and Olympic records were as follows.

World record	Ashton Eaton (USA)	9045	Beijing, China	29 August 2015
Olympic record	Roman Šebrle (CZE)	8893	Athens, Greece	24 August 2004
2016 World leading	Ashton Eaton (USA)	8750	Eugene, United States	3 July 2016

=== Records set during this event ===
Olympic record	Ashton Eaton (USA)	8893 (tie)	Rio de Janeiro, Brazil	18 August 2016
2016 World leading	Ashton Eaton (USA)	8893	Rio de Janeiro, Brazil	18 August 2016
Olympic decathlon best - 100 metres	Damian Warner (CAN)	10.30	Rio de Janeiro, Brazil	17 August 2016

== Detailed results ==
Key:	WDB	World decathlon best	ODB	Olympic decathlon best	NR	National record	PB	Personal best	SB	Seasonal best	DQ	Disqualified	DNS	Did not start	DNF	Did not finish

=== 100 metres ===
The 100 metres was held on 17 August at 09:30.

Rank	Heat	Athlete	Nationality	Result	Points	Notes
1	4	Damian Warner	Canada	10.30	1023	ODB
2	4	Ashton Eaton	United States	10.46	985	
3	4	Zach Ziemek	United States	10.71	926	
4	3	Rico Freimuth	Germany	10.73	922	
5	2	Larbi Bourrada	Algeria	10.75	917	SB
6	2	Luiz Alberto de Araújo	Brazil	10.77	912	SB
7	3	Oleksiy Kasyanov	Ukraine	10.78	910	SB
7	4	Kai Kazmirek	Germany	10.78	910	
9	4	Yordanis García	Cuba	10.81	903	
9	2	Kevin Mayer	France	10.81	903	PB
11	3	Karl Robert Saluri	Estonia	10.82	901	
12	3	Mihail Dudaš	Serbia	10.83	899	
12	4	Lindon Victor	Grenada	10.83	899	
14	4	Dominik Distelberger	Austria	10.84	897	
15	3	Cedric Dubler	Australia	10.86	892	
16	3	Arthur Abele	Germany	10.87	890	
16	2	Eelco Sintnicolaas	Netherlands	10.87	890	SB
18	3	Paweł Wiesiołek	Poland	10.88	888	
19	1	Kurt Felix	Grenada	10.93	876	SB
20	2	Jeremy Taiwo	United States	11.01	858	
21	1	Pieter Braun	Netherlands	11.03	854	SB
22	3	Akihiko Nakamura	Japan	11.04	852	
23	2	Adam Helcelet	Czech Republic	11.06	847	
24	2	Willem Coertzen	South Africa	11.12	834	
25	3	Jiří Sýkora	Czech Republic	11.15	827	
26	1	Maicel Uibo	Estonia	11.16	825	
27	1	Bastien Auzeil	France	11.17	823	
28	1	Leonel Suárez	Cuba	11.21	814	SB
29	1	Thomas Van der Plaetsen	Belgium	11.24	808	
30	2	Leonid Andreev	Uzbekistan	11.29	797	
31	1	Keisuke Ushiro	Japan	11.30	795	SB
32	1	Pau Tonnesen	Spain	11.32	791	SB

=== Long jump ===
The long jump was held on 17 August at 10:35.

Rank	Group	Athlete	Nationality	#1	#2	#3	Result	Points	Notes	Overall points	Overall rank
1	A	Ashton Eaton	United States	7.90	7.94	7.64	7.94	1045		2030	1
2	B	Kai Kazmirek	Germany	7.38	7.69	x	7.69	982	PB	1892	3
3	B	Damian Warner	Canada	7.60	x	7.67	7.67	977		2000	2
4	A	Thomas Van der Plaetsen	Belgium	7.66	7.58	5.71	7.66	975	SB	1783	13
5	A	Kevin Mayer	France	7.42	7.33	7.60	7.60	960	SB	1863	4
6	A	Pieter Braun	Netherlands	7.42	x	7.55	7.55	947	PB	1801	10
7	B	Oleksiy Kasyanov	Ukraine	7.54	x	x	7.54	945		1855	7
8	A	Larbi Bourrada	Algeria	7.30	7.52	7.45	7.52	940	SB	1857	6
9	A	Zach Ziemek	United States	7.30	7.37	7.49	7.49	932		1858	5
10	A	Luiz Alberto de Araújo	Brazil	7.48	x	7.41	7.48	930	PB	1842	8
11	A	Cedric Dubler	Australia	7.18	x	7.47	7.47	927		1819	9
12	B	Jeremy Taiwo	United States	7.30	7.45	x	7.45	922		1780	15
13	B	Kurt Felix	Grenada	x	7.42	x	7.42	915		1791	11
14	A	Adam Helcelet	Czech Republic	7.14	7.08	7.35	7.35	898		1745	17
15	A	Pau Tonnesen	Spain	7.33	x	7.31	7.33	893		1684	22
15	A	Dominik Distelberger	Austria	6.89	7.33	x	7.33	893		1790	12
17	B	Mihail Dudaš	Serbia	x	x	7.29	7.29	883		1782	14
18	A	Rico Freimuth	Germany	x	x	7.17	7.17	854	SB	1776	16
19	A	Maicel Uibo	Estonia	x	7.14	7.13	7.14	847		1672	24
19	B	Leonel Suárez	Cuba	x	7.09	7.14	7.14	847		1661	25
21	A	Akihiko Nakamura	Japan	7.00	x	7.13	7.13	845		1697	21
22	A	Lindon Victor	Grenada	7.11	6.90	6.84	7.11	840		1739	18
23	B	Bastien Auzeil	France	x	6.91	7.07	7.07	830		1653	26
24	B	Karl Robert Saluri	Estonia	6.94	7.02	x	7.02	818		1719	19
25	B	Jiří Sýkora	Czech Republic	x	x	7.00	7.00	814		1641	28
26	B	Willem Coertzen	South Africa	6.98	6.93	x	6.98	809		1643	27
27	B	Arthur Abele	Germany	x	x	6.97	6.97	807		1697	20
28	B	Keisuke Ushiro	Japan	6.68	6.83	6.60	6.83	774		1569	30
28	A	Yordanis García	Cuba	6.51	x	6.83	6.83	774	SB	1677	23
30	B	Paweł Wiesiołek	Poland	6.73	x	x	6.73	750		1638	29
31	B	Leonid Andreev	Uzbekistan	6.57	6.60	–	6.60	720		1517	31

Note: Eelco Sintnicolaas of the Netherlands did not compete.

=== Shot put ===
The shot put was held on 17 August at 12:15.

Rank	Group	Athlete	Nationality	#1	#2	#3	Result	Points	Notes	Overall points	Overall rank
1	A	Kevin Mayer	France	15.76	x	–	15.76	836		2699	3
2	B	Bastien Auzeil	France	15.41	x	x	15.41	815	SB	2468	17
3	A	Luiz Alberto de Araújo	Brazil	14.45	14.63	15.26	15.26	806	SB	2648	4
4	A	Adam Helcelet	Czech Republic	15.11	14.65	15.03	15.11	796		2541	11
5	B	Arthur Abele	Germany	x	15.03	x	15.03	792		2489	15
6	B	Jeremy Taiwo	United States	14.92	14.33	x	14.92	785	SB	2565	9
7	B	Leonid Andreev	Uzbekistan	14.86	14.33	x	14.86	781		2298	30
8	A	Lindon Victor	Grenada	x	x	14.80	14.80	777		2516	14
9	B	Kurt Felix	Grenada	14.13	14.77	14.55	14.77	776		2567	8
10	A	Ashton Eaton	United States	14.72	14.73	14.58	14.73	773		2803	1
11	A	Yordanis García	Cuba	14.58	14.37	14.39	14.58	764	SB	2441	19
12	B	Oleksiy Kasyanov	Ukraine	x	14.50	x	14.50	759		2614	6
13	B	Leonel Suárez	Cuba	13.77	14.27	14.11	14.27	745	SB	2406	22
14	B	Mihail Dudaš	Serbia	13.96	14.23	x	14.23	742		2524	12
15	B	Kai Kazmirek	Germany	14.15	14.20	13.87	14.20	741		2633	5
16	B	Paweł Wiesiołek	Poland	13.38	x	14.17	14.17	739	SB	2377	25
17	B	Keisuke Ushiro	Japan	13.91	14.14	14.03	14.14	737		2306	28
18	B	Willem Coertzen	South Africa	14.00	x	x	14.00	728	SB	2371	26
19	A	Pieter Braun	Netherlands	13.77	13.90	x	13.90	722		2523	13
20	B	Karl Robert Saluri	Estonia	13.88	13.74	13.55	13.88	721		2440	20
21	A	Larbi Bourrada	Algeria	13.47	12.74	13.78	13.78	715	SB	2572	7
22	A	Pau Tonnesen	Spain	x	13.69	x	13.69	709		2393	24
23	B	Damian Warner	Canada	13.53	12.62	13.66	13.66	708		2708	2
24	B	Jiří Sýkora	Czech Republic	13.04	13.45	x	13.45	695		2336	27
25	A	Zach Ziemek	United States	12.96	13.44	13.32	13.44	694		2552	10
26	A	Dominik Distelberger	Austria	13.15	13.23	13.40	13.40	692		2482	16
27	A	Rico Freimuth	Germany	12.75	13.25	13.27	13.27	684		2460	18
28	A	Thomas Van der Plaetsen	Belgium	12.84	x	12.56	12.84	657		2440	21
29	A	Akihiko Nakamura	Japan	12.00	11.36	11.92	12.00	606		2303	29
30	A	Cedric Dubler	Australia	11.49	11.38	11.43	11.49	575		2394	23
–	A	Maicel Uibo	Estonia	x	x	x	NM	0		1672	31

=== High jump ===
The high jump was held on 17 August at 17:45.

Rank	Group	Athlete	Nationality	1.77	1.80	1.83	1.86	1.89	1.92	1.95	1.98	2.01	2.04	2.07	2.10	2.13	2.16	2.19	2.22	Result	Points	Notes	Overall points	Overall rank
1	A	Jeremy Taiwo	United States										o	o	o	xo	o	xxo	xxx	2.19	982		3547	3
2	A	Thomas Van der Plaetsen	Belgium									o	–	o	o	o	xo	xxx		2.16	953	SB	3393	10
3	A	Cedric Dubler	Australia										o	o	xxo	o	xxx			2.13	925		3319	14
3	A	Maicel Uibo	Estonia									o	–	o	–	xxo	–	xxx		2.13	925	SB	2597	28
5	A	Kai Kazmirek	Germany							o	–	o	o	o	o	xxx				2.10	896	SB	3529	5
5	A	Zach Ziemek	United States								o	o	o	o	o	xxx				2.10	896	PB	3448	7
5	B	Larbi Bourrada	Algeria					o	o	o	o	o	xxo	o	xo	xxr				2.10	896	PB	3468	6
8	A	Kurt Felix	Grenada							o	–	xo	xo	o	xxx					2.07	868		3435	8
8	A	Leonel Suárez	Cuba						o	–	xo	o	o	xxo	xxx					2.07	868	SB	3274	18
10	B	Damian Warner	Canada						o	o	o	o	xo	xxx						2.04	840	SB	3548	2
10	A	Mihail Dudaš	Serbia					o	–	xo	o	xxo	xo	xxx						2.04	840	SB	3364	13
10	B	Kevin Mayer	France						o	–	o	o	xxo	r						2.04	840	SB	3539	4
10	A	Adam Helcelet	Czech Republic					o	o	o	o	xo	xxo	xxx						2.04	840		3381	11
14	A	Paweł Wiesiołek	Poland					o	o	o	o	o	xxx							2.01	813		3190	22
14	B	Yordanis García	Cuba				o	o	o	o	xo	o	xxx							2.01	813	SB	3254	19
14	B	Oleksiy Kasyanov	Ukraine					o	o	o	xo	o	xxx							2.01	813		3427	9
14	A	Pau Tonnesen	Spain							o	xo	xo	xxx							2.01	813		3206	21
14	B	Ashton Eaton	United States						o	o	xo	xxo	xxx							2.01	813	SB	3616	1
19	B	Lindon Victor	Grenada					o	o	o	o	xxx								1.98	785		3301	15
19	A	Bastien Auzeil	France						o	–	xo	xxx								1.98	785		3253	20
19	B	Jiří Sýkora	Czech Republic				o	o	xo	o	xo	xxx								1.98	785		3121	24
19	B	Keisuke Ushiro	Japan				o	o	xo	xxo	xo	xxx								1.98	785		3091	25
19	B	Arthur Abele	Germany				o	xo	o	o	xxo	xxx								1.98	785	SB	3274	17
24	A	Pieter Braun	Netherlands					o	o	o	xxr									1.95	758		3281	16
25	B	Luiz Alberto de Araújo	Brazil			o	–	o	o	xxx										1.92	731		3379	12
25	B	Akihiko Nakamura	Japan				o	o	xxo	xxx										1.92	731		3034	27
27	B	Dominik Distelberger	Austria			o	o	o	xxx											1.89	705		3187	23
28	B	Karl Robert Saluri	Estonia	o	xxx															1.77	602		3042	26

Note: Leonid Andreev of Uzbekistan, Rico Freimuth of Germany, and Willem Coertzen of South Africa did not compete.

=== 400 metres ===
The 400 metres was held on 17 August at 21:30.

Rank	Heat	Athlete	Nationality	Result	Points	Notes	Overall points	Overall rank
1	4	Ashton Eaton	United States	46.07	1005		4621	1
2	4	Kai Kazmirek	Germany	46.75	971	PB	4500	2
3	4	Damian Warner	Canada	47.35	941		4489	3
4	1	Larbi Bourrada	Algeria	47.98	910		4378	6
5	2	Luiz Alberto de Araújo	Brazil	48.14	902	PB	4281	9
6	2	Leonel Suárez	Cuba	48.15	902	SB	4176	15
7	4	Cedric Dubler	Australia	48.18	900	PB	4219	12
8	2	Kevin Mayer	France	48.28	896	PB	4435	4
9	3	Oleksiy Kasyanov	Ukraine	48.56	882	SB	4309	7
10	4	Dominik Distelberger	Austria	48.61	880		4067	20
11	3	Yordanis García	Cuba	48.69	876	SB	4130	17
12	3	Jeremy Taiwo	United States	48.78	872		4419	5
13	4	Akihiko Nakamura	Japan	48.93	865		3899	24
14	3	Arthur Abele	Germany	49.02	860	SB	4134	16
15	3	Mihail Dudaš	Serbia	49.13	855		4219	13
16	2	Kurt Felix	Grenada	49.14	855	SB	4290	8
17	2	Bastien Auzeil	France	49.34	845	SB	4098	19
18	1	Adam Helcelet	Czech Republic	49.51	837	SB	4218	14
19	1	Thomas Van der Plaetsen	Belgium	49.63	832	SB	4225	11
20	4	Lindon Victor	Grenada	49.80	824		4125	18
21	3	Zach Ziemek	United States	49.83	822		4270	10
22	3	Jiří Sýkora	Czech Republic	49.88	820		3941	23
23	2	Paweł Wiesiołek	Poland	50.18	806		3996	21
24	4	Karl Robert Saluri	Estonia	50.32	800		3842	26
25	1	Keisuke Ushiro	Japan	50.43	795		3886	25
26	1	Pau Tonnesen	Spain	50.81	778		3984	22
27	1	Maicel Uibo	Estonia	51.08	765		3362	27

Note: Pieter Braun of the Netherlands did not compete.

=== 110 metres hurdles ===
The 110 metres hurdles was held on 18 August at 09:30.

Rank	Heat	Athlete	Nationality	Result	Points	Notes	Overall points	Overall rank
1	4	Damian Warner	Canada	13.58	1029		5518	2
2	4	Ashton Eaton	United States	13.80	1000		5621	1
3	4	Kevin Mayer	France	14.02	972		5407	3
4	4	Arthur Abele	Germany	14.12	959		5093	14
5	1	Larbi Bourrada	Algeria	14.15	955	PB	5333	5
6	2	Luiz Alberto de Araújo	Brazil	14.17	953	SB	5234	8
7	3	Yordanis García	Cuba	14.25	942	SB	5072	17
8	3	Cedric Dubler	Australia	14.30	936		5155	10
9	4	Oleksiy Kasyanov	Ukraine	14.34	931		5240	7
10	2	Adam Helcelet	Czech Republic	14.37	927	SB	5145	12
11	2	Dominik Distelberger	Austria	14.39	925	SB	4992	18
12	2	Leonel Suárez	Cuba	14.48	913	SB	5089	15
13	4	Akihiko Nakamura	Japan	14.57	902		4801	23
13	3	Jeremy Taiwo	United States	14.57	902		5321	6
15	4	Kai Kazmirek	Germany	14.62	896		5396	4
16	2	Mihail Dudaš	Serbia	14.65	892		5111	13
17	1	Zach Ziemek	United States	14.77	878		5148	11
18	1	Kurt Felix	Grenada	14.79	875	SB	5165	9
19	3	Bastien Auzeil	France	14.82	871		4969	19
20	2	Maicel Uibo	Estonia	14.84	869		4231	27
21	3	Pau Tonnesen	Spain	14.99	851		4835	22
22	3	Thomas Van der Plaetsen	Belgium	15.01	848		5073	16
23	3	Jiří Sýkora	Czech Republic	15.02	847		4788	24
24	1	Keisuke Ushiro	Japan	15.09	839		4725	25
24	2	Paweł Wiesiołek	Poland	15.09	839		4835	21
26	1	Lindon Victor	Grenada	15.74	762		4887	20
27	1	Karl Robert Saluri	Estonia	16.51	676		4518	26

=== Discus throw ===
The discus throw was held on 18 August at 10:25.

Rank	Group	Name	Nationality	#1	#2	#3	Result	Points	Notes	Overall points	Overall rank
1	A	Lindon Victor	Grenada	53.21	x	53.24	53.24	938		5825	14
2	A	Keisuke Ushiro	Japan	47.86	48.42	49.90	49.90	868	SB	5593	22
3	A	Zach Ziemek	United States	45.32	49.42	x	49.42	858	PB	6006	6
4	A	Paweł Wiesiołek	Poland	44.93	x	48.32	48.32	835	PB	5670	19
5	B	Leonel Suárez	Cuba	47.07	x	x	47.07	810	SB	5899	10
6	A	Kevin Mayer	France	x	46.78	x	46.78	804		6211	3
7	B	Pau Tonnesen	Spain	42.83	44.85	46.31	46.31	794	SB	5629	20
8	B	Ashton Eaton	United States	43.16	45.49	45.39	45.49	777	SB	6398	1
9	A	Kurt Felix	Grenada	42.88	42.98	45.10	45.10	769		5934	9
9	A	Luiz Alberto de Araújo	Brazil	x	40.70	45.10	45.10	769		6003	7
11	A	Damian Warner	Canada	x	42.43	44.93	44.93	765		6283	2
12	A	Arthur Abele	Germany	44.66	44.00	43.94	44.66	760		5853	12
13	B	Jiří Sýkora	Czech Republic	41.36	44.11	44.49	44.49	756		5544	23
14	A	Adam Helcelet	Czech Republic	x	42.11	44.13	44.13	749		5894	11
15	B	Thomas Van der Plaetsen	Belgium	42.57	43.58	41.98	43.58	738		5811	15
16	A	Mihail Dudaš	Serbia	43.27	42.23	42.13	43.27	731		5842	13
17	B	Kai Kazmirek	Germany	37.61	41.98	43.25	43.25	731		6127	4
18	B	Karl Robert Saluri	Estonia	39.97	42.96	42.37	42.96	725		5243	25
19	B	Larbi Bourrada	Algeria	37.12	42.39	x	42.39	713	PB	6046	5
20	A	Bastien Auzeil	France	41.35	42.23	x	42.23	710		5679	18
21	B	Yordanis García	Cuba	x	40.34	40.13	40.34	671	SB	5743	17
22	B	Jeremy Taiwo	United States	x	39.91	38.62	39.91	663		5984	8
23	B	Cedric Dubler	Australia	38.16	32.93	38.89	38.89	642		5797	16
24	B	Dominik Distelberger	Austria	35.82	38.09	x	38.09	626		5618	21
25	A	Maicel Uibo	Estonia	x	x	37.69	37.69	618		4849	27
26	B	Akihiko Nakamura	Japan	x	34.91	34.83	34.91	562		5363	24
–	A	Oleksiy Kasyanov	Ukraine	x	x	x	NM	0		5240	26

=== Pole vault ===
The pole vault was held on 18 August at 13:25.

Rank	Group	Name	Nationality	4.10	4.20	4.30	4.40	4.50	4.60	4.70	4.80	4.90	5.00	5.10	5.20	5.30	5.40	5.50	Result	Points	Notes	Overall points	Overall rank
1	A	Kevin Mayer	France	–	–	–	–	–	–	–	–	–	o	–	xo	o	xo	xxx	5.40	1035	PB	7246	2
1	A	Thomas Van der Plaetsen	Belgium	–	–	–	–	–	–	–	–	–	–	o	–	o	xxo	xxx	5.40	1035		6846	8
3	A	Zach Ziemek	United States	–	–	–	–	–	–	–	–	–	o	o	xo	xxx			5.20	972		6978	5
3	A	Ashton Eaton	United States	–	–	–	–	–	–	o	–	xxo	–	xxo	xo	–	xxx		5.20	972		7370	1
3	A	Pau Tonnesen	Spain	–	–	–	–	–	–	–	xo	–	o	–	xxo	–	xxx		5.20	972		6601	17
6	A	Bastien Auzeil	France	–	–	–	–	–	–	–	xo	–	xxo	o	xxx				5.10	941	SB	6620	15
6	A	Maicel Uibo	Estonia	–	–	–	–	–	–	–	–	xo	–	xxo	xxx				5.10	941		5790	25
8	A	Kai Kazmirek	Germany	–	–	–	–	–	–	–	o	–	o	–	xxx				5.00	910		7037	4
8	A	Jeremy Taiwo	United States	–	–	–	–	–	–	o	xo	xxo	xxo	xxx					5.00	910	PB	6894	6
10	B	Cedric Dubler	Australia	–	–	–	–	o	–	xo	–	o	xxx						4.90	880	PB	6677	13
10	A	Luiz Alberto de Araújo	Brazil	–	–	–	–	–	–	xo	xo	o	xxx						4.90	880		6883	7
10	B	Leonel Suárez	Cuba	–	–	o	–	o	–	xxo	o	o	xxx						4.90	880	SB	6779	10
10	B	Keisuke Ushiro	Japan	–	–	–	–	o	o	o	xxo	xo	xxx						4.90	880	PB	6473	20
14	A	Dominik Distelberger	Austria	–	–	–	–	–	o	–	xo	xxx							4.80	849		6467	21
15	A	Adam Helcelet	Czech Republic	–	–	–	–	o	–	o	xxx								4.70	819		6713	11
15	B	Akihiko Nakamura	Japan	–	–	–	o	o	o	xxo	xxx								4.70	819		6182	23
15	B	Damian Warner	Canada	–	–	–	–	o	xo	xxo	xxx								4.70	819		7102	3
18	B	Larbi Bourrada	Algeria	–	–	–	–	–	o	–	xxx								4.60	790		6836	9
18	B	Mihail Dudaš	Serbia	–	–	–	o	–	o	xxx									4.60	790		6632	14
20	A	Arthur Abele	Germany	–	–	–	–	o	–	xxx									4.50	760		6613	16
20	B	Yordanis García	Cuba	–	–	–	–	o	–	xxx									4.50	760		6503	19
20	A	Karl Robert Saluri	Estonia	–	–	–	–	o	–	r									4.50	760		6003	24
20	B	Paweł Wiesiołek	Poland	–	–	–	o	o	xxx										4.50	760		6430	22
20	B	Kurt Felix	Grenada	–	–	xo	o	o	xxx										4.50	760		6694	12
25	B	Lindon Victor	Grenada	xxo	o	o	xo	xxx											4.40	731		6556	18
–	B	Jiří Sýkora	Czech Republic	–	–	xxx													NM	0		5544	26

Note: Oleksiy Kasyanov of Ukraine did not compete.

=== Javelin throw ===
Video on YouTube Official Video Highlights

The javelin throw was held on 18 August at 18:35.

Rank	Group	Name	Nationality	#1	#2	#3	Result	Points	Notes	Overall points	Overall rank
1	B	Leonel Suárez	Cuba	x	70.05	72.32	72.32	925		7704	6
2	A	Kurt Felix	Grenada	62.79	66.66	69.92	69.92	888	PB	7582	9
3	A	Adam Helcelet	Czech Republic	60.84	62.42	68.20	68.20	862	PB	7575	11
4	B	Keisuke Ushiro	Japan	56.54	62.13	66.63	66.63	838		7311	18
5	A	Larbi Bourrada	Algeria	64.63	65.22	66.49	66.49	836	PB	7672	7
6	B	Kevin Mayer	France	65.04	x	x	65.04	814		8060	2
7	A	Yordanis García	Cuba	63.22	64.70	62.60	64.70	809		7312	17
8	B	Kai Kazmirek	Germany	64.60	x	55.10	64.60	807	PB	7844	4
9	A	Arthur Abele	Germany	61.05	64.13	x	64.13	800		7413	13
10	A	Lindon Victor	Grenada	x	62.24	63.54	63.54	791		7347	15
11	B	Damian Warner	Canada	58.01	56.74	63.19	63.19	786	SB	7888	3
12	B	Thomas Van der Plaetsen	Belgium	60.23	59.92	62.09	62.09	769	SB	7615	8
13	B	Bastien Auzeil	France	61.91	60.64	x	61.91	767	SB	7387	14
14	A	Dominik Distelberger	Austria	61.83	61.52	58.35	61.83	765	PB	7232	20
15	B	Zach Ziemek	United States	57.27	60.22	60.92	60.92	752	PB	7730	5
16	B	Maicel Uibo	Estonia	x	57.34	60.52	60.52	746		6536	24
17	B	Pau Tonnesen	Spain	56.96	x	60.15	60.15	740		7341	16
18	B	Ashton Eaton	United States	53.26	58.26	59.77	59.77	734		8104	1
19	B	Luiz Alberto de Araújo	Brazil	55.67	57.28	57.10	57.28	697	PB	7580	10
20	A	Jiří Sýkora	Czech Republic	56.99	56.26	x	56.99	693		6237	25
21	A	Paweł Wiesiołek	Poland	54.79	55.92	56.68	56.68	688		7118	21
22	B	Cedric Dubler	Australia	51.82	x	42.82	51.82	616		7293	19
23	A	Jeremy Taiwo	United States	51.29	x	x	51.29	608		7502	12
24	A	Akihiko Nakamura	Japan	50.34	51.16	51.24	51.24	607		6789	22
25	A	Karl Robert Saluri	Estonia	46.42	–	–	46.42	536		6539	23

Note: Mihail Dudaš of Serbia did not compete.

=== 1500 metres ===
The 1500 metres was held on 18 August at 21:45.

Rank	Heat	Athlete	Nationality	Result	Points	Notes	Overall points	Overall rank
1	2	Larbi Bourrada	Algeria	4:14.60	849		8521	5
2	1	Akihiko Nakamura	Japan	4:18.37	823		7612	22
3	2	Jeremy Taiwo	United States	4:21.96	798		8300	11
4	2	Ashton Eaton	United States	4:23.33	789	SB	8893	1
5	2	Damian Warner	Canada	4:24.90	778	SB	8666	3
6	2	Kevin Mayer	France	4:25.49	774	SB	8834	2
7	2	Leonel Suárez	Cuba	4:28.32	756	SB	8460	6
8	2	Kurt Felix	Grenada	4:30.53	741	PB	8323	9
9	2	Kai Kazmirek	Germany	4:31.25	736	PB	8580	4
10	2	Luiz Alberto de Araújo	Brazil	4:31.46	735	SB	8315	10
11	1	Cedric Dubler	Australia	4:32.12	731	PB	8024	14
12	1	Dominik Distelberger	Austria	4:33.47	722	SB	7954	19
13	2	Thomas Van der Plaetsen	Belgium	4:34.21	717	SB	8332	8
14	2	Adam Sebastian Helcelet	Czech Republic	4:34.41	716	PB	8291	12
15	1	Karl Robert Saluri	Estonia	4:39.40	684		7223	23
16	1	Bastien Auzeil	France	4:40.50	677		8064	13
17	1	Paweł Wiesiołek	Poland	4:42.27	666		7784	21
18	2	Zach Ziemek	United States	4:42.97	662		8392	7
19	1	Lindon Victor	Grenada	4:44.73	651		7998	16
20	1	Yordanis García	Cuba	4:44.99	649		7961	18
21	1	Pau Tonnesen	Spain	4:46.27	641		7982	17
22	1	Keisuke Ushiro	Japan	4:46.33	641		7952	20
23	1	Maicel Uibo	Estonia	4:47.49	634		7170	24
24	1	Arthur Abele	Germany	4:53.07	600		8013	15
–	1	Jiří Sýkora	Czech Republic	DNF	0		6237	25

== Overall results ==
Eaton secured his second Olympic title, with an Olympic record-tying score of 8893.

Key

The highest mark recorded in each event is highlighted in yellow. These marks were split between eight competitors with the gold medallist claiming two of them.

Key:	OR	Olympic record	AR	Area record	NR	National record	PB	Personal best	SB	Seasonal best	DNS	Did not start	DNF	Did not finish

Rank	Athlete	Nationality	Overall points	100 m	LJ	SP	HJ	400 m	110 m H	DT	PV	JT	1500 m
1st place, gold medalist(s)	Ashton Eaton	United States	8893 =OR	985; 10.46	1045; 7.94	773; 14.73	813; 2.01	1005; 46.07	1000; 13.80	777; 45.49	972; 5.20	734; 59.77	789; 4:23.33
2nd place, silver medalist(s)	Kevin Mayer	France	8834 NR	903; 10.81	960; 7.60	836; 15.76	840; 2.04	896; 48.28	972; 14.02	804; 46.78	1035; 5.40	814; 65.04	774; 4:25.49
3rd place, bronze medalist(s)	Damian Warner	Canada	8666 SB	1023; 10.30	977; 7.67	708; 13.66	840; 2.04	941; 47.35	1029; 13.58	765; 44.93	819; 4.70	786; 63.19	778; 4:24.90
4	Kai Kazmirek	Germany	8580 PB	910; 10.78	982; 7.69	741; 14.20	896; 2.10	971; 46.75	896; 14.62	731; 43.25	910; 5.00	807; 64.60	736; 4:31.25
5	Larbi Bourrada	Algeria	8521 AR	917; 10.75	940; 7.52	715; 13.78	896; 2.10	910; 47.98	955; 14.15	713; 42.39	790; 4.60	836; 66.49	849; 4:14.60
6	Leonel Suárez	Cuba	8460 SB	814; 11.21	847; 7.14	745; 14.27	868; 2.07	902; 48.15	913; 14.48	810; 47.07	880; 4.90	925; 72.32	756; 4:28.32
7	Zach Ziemek	United States	8392	926; 10.71	932; 7.49	694; 13.44	896; 2.10	822; 49.83	878; 14.77	858; 49.42	972; 5.20	752; 60.92	662; 4:42.97
8	Thomas Van der Plaetsen	Belgium	8332 PB	808; 11.24	975; 7.66	657; 12.84	953; 2.16	832; 49.63	848; 15.01	738; 43.58	1035; 5.40	769; 62.09	717; 4:34.21
9	Kurt Felix	Grenada	8323 PB	876; 10.93	915; 7.42	776; 14.77	868; 2.07	855; 49.14	875; 14.79	769; 45.10	760; 4.50	888; 69.92	741; 4:30.53
10	Luiz Alberto de Araújo	Brazil	8315 PB	912; 10.77	930; 7.48	806; 15.26	731; 1.92	902; 48.14	953; 14.17	769; 45.10	880; 4.90	697; 57.28	735; 4:31.46
11	Jeremy Taiwo	United States	8300	858; 11.01	922; 7.45	785; 14.92	982; 2.19	872; 48.78	902; 14.57	663; 39.91	910; 5.00	608; 51.29	798; 4:21.96
12	Adam Helcelet	Czech Republic	8291 PB	847; 11.06	898; 7.35	796; 15.11	840; 2.04	837; 49.51	927; 14.37	749; 44.13	819; 4.70	862; 68.20	716; 4:34.41
13	Bastien Auzeil	France	8064	823; 11.17	830; 7.07	815; 15.41	785; 1.98	845; 49.34	871; 14.82	710; 42.23	941; 5.10	767; 61.91	677; 4:40.50
14	Cedric Dubler	Australia	8024	892; 10.86	927; 7.47	575; 11.49	925; 2.13	900; 48.18	936; 14.30	642; 38.89	880; 4.90	616; 51.82	731; 4:32.12
15	Arthur Abele	Germany	8013	890; 10.87	807; 6.97	792; 15.03	785; 1.98	860; 49.02	959; 14.12	760; 44.66	760; 4.50	800; 64.13	600; 4:53.07
16	Lindon Victor	Grenada	7998	899; 10.83	840; 7.11	777; 14.80	785; 1.98	824; 49.80	762; 15.74	938; 53.24	731; 4.40	791; 63.54	651; 4:44.73
17	Pau Tonnesen	Spain	7982	791; 11.32	893; 7.33	709; 13.69	813; 2.01	778; 50.81	851; 14.99	794; 46.31	972; 5.20	740; 60.15	641; 4:46.27
18	Yordanis García	Cuba	7961	903; 10.81	774; 6.83	764; 14.58	813; 2.01	876; 48.69	942; 14.25	671; 40.34	760; 4.50	809; 64.70	649; 4:44.99
19	Dominik Distelberger	Austria	7954	897; 10.84	893; 7.33	692; 13.40	705; 1.89	880; 48.61	925; 14.39	626; 38.09	849; 4.80	765; 61.83	722; 4:33.47
20	Keisuke Ushiro	Japan	7952	795; 11.30	774; 6.83	737; 14.14	785; 1.98	795; 50.43	839; 15.09	868; 49.90	880; 4.90	838; 66.63	641; 4:46.33
21	Paweł Wiesiołek	Poland	7784	888; 10.88	750; 6.73	739; 14.17	813; 2.01	806; 50.18	839; 15.09	835; 48.32	760; 4.50	688; 56.68	666; 4:42.27
22	Akihiko Nakamura	Japan	7612	852; 11.04	845; 7.13	606; 12.00	731; 1.92	865; 48.93	902; 14.57	562; 34.91	819; 4.70	607; 51.24	823; 4:18.37
23	Karl Robert Saluri	Estonia	7223	901; 10.82	818; 7.02	721; 13.88	602; 1.77	800; 50.32	676; 16.51	725; 42.96	760; 4.50	536; 46.42	684; 4:39.40
24	Maicel Uibo	Estonia	7170	825; 11.16	847; 7.14	0 NM	925; 2.13	765; 51.08	869; 14.84	618; 37.69	941; 5.10	746; 60.52	634; 4:47.49
25	Jiří Sýkora	Czech Republic	6237	827; 11.15	814; 7.00	695; 13.45	785; 1.98	820; 49.88	847; 15.02	756; 44.49	0 NM	693; 56.99	DNF
n/a	Mihail Dudaš	Serbia	DNF	899; 10.83	883; 7.29	742; 14.23	840; 2.04	855; 49.13	892; 14.65	731; 43.27	790; 4.60	DNS	DNS
n/a	Oleksiy Kasyanov	Ukraine	DNF	910; 10.78	945; 7.54	759; 14.50	813; 2.01	882; 48.56	931; 14.34	0 NM	DNS	DNS	DNS
n/a	Pieter Braun	Netherlands	DNF	854; 11.03	947; 7.55	722; 13.90	758; 1.95	DNS	DNS	DNS	DNS	DNS	DNS
n/a	Rico Freimuth	Germany	DNF	922; 10.73	854; 7.17	684; 13.27	DNS	DNS	DNS	DNS	DNS	DNS	DNS
n/a	Willem Coertzen	South Africa	DNF	834; 11.12	809; 6.98	728; 14.00	DNS	DNS	DNS	DNS	DNS	DNS	DNS
n/a	Leonid Andreev	Uzbekistan	DNF	797; 11.29	720; 6.60	781; 14.86	DNS	DNS	DNS	DNS	DNS	DNS	DNS
n/a	Eelco Sintnicolaas	Netherlands	DNF	890; 10.87	DNS	DNS	DNS	DNS	DNS	DNS	DNS	DNS	DNS
