= Kevin Mayer =

French decathlete

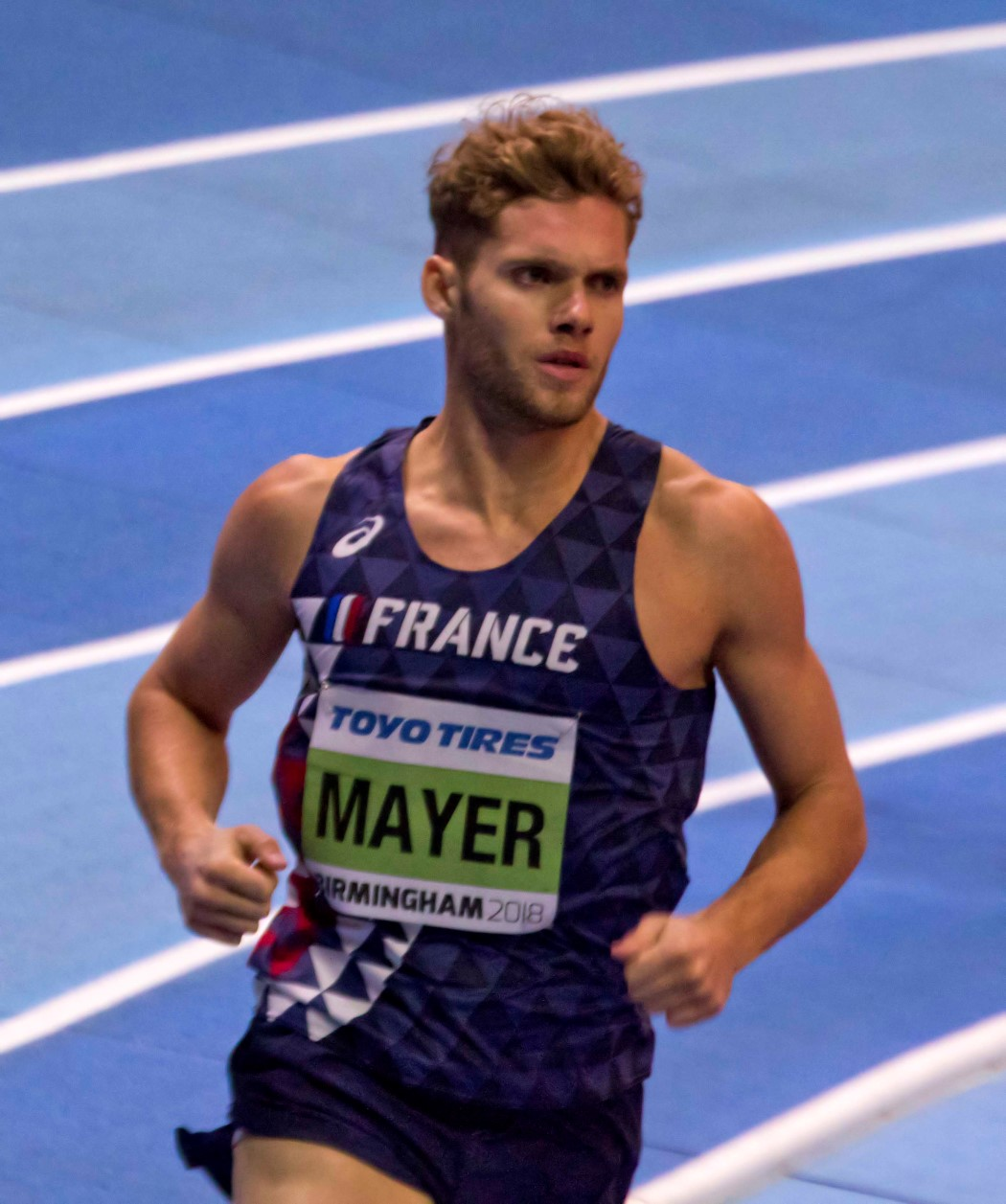
- Mayer at the 2018 World Indoor Championships

Personal information
- Born: 10 February 1992 (age 34) Argenteuil, France
- Height: 185 cm (6 ft 1 in)
- Weight: 82 kg (181 lb)

Sport
- Country: France
- Sport: Athletics
- Events: Decathlon, heptathlon
- Club: EA Rhône Vercors 26-07
- Coached by: Bertrand Valcin

Achievements and titles
- Personal bests: Decathlon: 9126 (WR); Heptathlon: 6479 (AR)
Medal record
Men's athletics
Representing France
Olympic Games
Silver medal – second place	2016 Rio de Janeiro	Decathlon
Silver medal – second place	2020 Tokyo	Decathlon
World Championships
Gold medal – first place	2017 London	Decathlon
Gold medal – first place	2022 Eugene	Decathlon
World Indoor Championships
Gold medal – first place	2018 Birmingham	Heptathlon
European Championships
Silver medal – second place	2014 Zürich	Decathlon
European Indoor Championships
Gold medal – first place	2017 Belgrade	Heptathlon
Gold medal – first place	2021 Toruń	Heptathlon
Gold medal – first place	2023 Istanbul	Heptathlon
Silver medal – second place	2013 Gothenburg	Heptathlon
World Junior Championships
Gold medal – first place	2010 Moncton	Decathlon
European Junior Championships
Gold medal – first place	2011 Tallinn	Decathlon
World Youth Championships
Gold medal – first place	2009 Brixen	Octathlon

Kevin Mayer (French: [kevin majɛʁ], [mejɛʁ] or [majœr], born 10 February 1992) is a French athlete specialising in decathlon and indoor heptathlon. He is two-time world champion (in 2017 and 2022), two-time Olympic silver medalist (2016 Rio and 2020 Tokyo Olympics) and the world record holder in the decathlon since 2018. He is also a world and three-time European champion in heptathlon.

Mayer started competing as a junior and he became the world junior champion in decathlon in 2010. He started winning medals as a senior in European Championships for heptathlon in 2013 and decathlon in 2014. He won his first medal at the Olympics when he came second in decathlon at the 2016 Rio Olympics. He became a world decathlon champion in 2017. In 2018, he became a world indoor champion in heptathlon, and set a world record in decathlon with 9126 points the same year. In 2021, he came second again in decathlon at the Tokyo Olympics. In 2022, he won his second decathlon gold at the World Championships.

== Career ==
=== 2008–2011: Youth career ===
In 2009, at the age of 17, Mayer won the octathlon gold medal at the World Youth Championships. In the following year, he won the decathlon gold medal at the 2010 World Junior Championships.

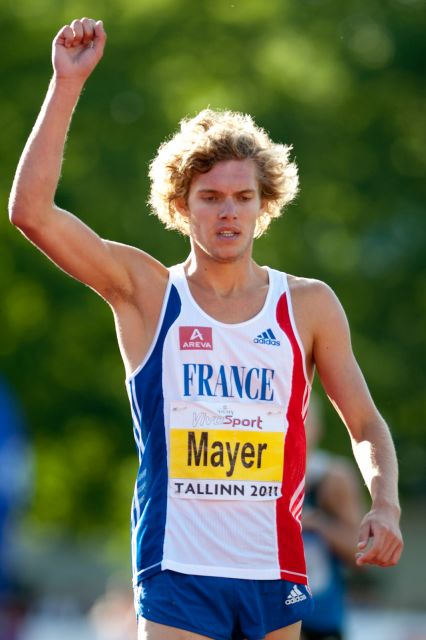
Mayer at the 2011 Junior Championships

In 2011, at the European Athletics Junior Championships held in Tallinn, Mayer won the decathlon gold.

=== 2012: First Olympic Games ===
Mayer competed at the 2012 Summer Olympics, finishing 15th.

=== 2013–2015: European Championships medals ===
He won a silver medal in the heptathlon at the 2013 European Athletics Indoor Championships with a new personal best of 6297 points. At the 2013 European Cup Combined Events he topped the podium and set personal bests in the 100 metres (11.04 sec), long jump (7.63 m), shot put (14.95 m) and the discus throw (44.89 m).

In 2014, at the European Athletics Championships held in Zurich, Mayer achieved a personal best of 8521 points in decathlon, winning him the silver medal.

On 12 August 2015, Mayer announced his withdrawal from the 2015 World Championships because of a hamstring injury sustained in the end of July 2015.

=== 2016: Olympic silver medal ===
On 6 March 2016, Mayer announced his withdrawal from the 2016 World Indoor Championships because of a heel injury sustained during the hurdles race at the French Indoor Athletics Championships held at the end of February in Aubière.

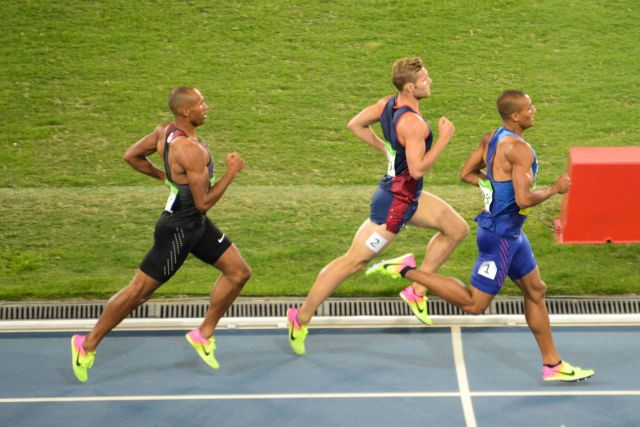
Mayer in 1500 m race at the Rio Olympics

At the 2016 Rio Olympics, Mayer earned a silver medal with a new personal best of 8834 points, finishing behind only two-time gold medallist Ashton Eaton, who was the world record holder at the time. Highlights of his campaign include equalling or improving personal outdoor bests in four events (100 m, shot put, 400 m, pole vault) and performing seasonal bests in three others (long jump, high jump, 1500 m); he was also the best decathlete in two disciplines (the shot put, with 15.76 m and 836 points; and the pole vault, with 5.40 m and 1035 points, sharing first place with Thomas van der Plaetsen) and led the standings at the end of the first day of the competition (i.e. after 5 out of 10 events). Furthermore, this performance ranks as the sixth-best personal best score in the men's decathlon, and showed a marked improvement in form for Mayer, bettering his former personal best of 8521 points (set during the aforementioned silver medal run at the 2014 European Athletics Championships) by 313 points and the French national record by 260 points.

=== 2017: European Indoor Champion and World Champion ===
Mayer's first combined events competition of the year was an indoor track and field triathlon (60m hurdles, shot put, long jump) at the National Indoor Meeting of Paris on 8 February. He finished last (out of three), with 1652 points after failing to receive a score in the 60m hurdles.

At the 2017 European Athletics Indoor Championships in Belgrade on 4–5 March, Mayer won the gold medal in the men's heptathlon. He set a new European record of 6479 points, beating the record set by Roman Šebrle in 2004 in Budapest by 41 points. It was also the second-best score in men's indoor heptathlon, behind Ashton Eaton's world record of 6645 points. He achieved two new indoor personal bests (in 60m hurdles and pole vault) and established a new European record.

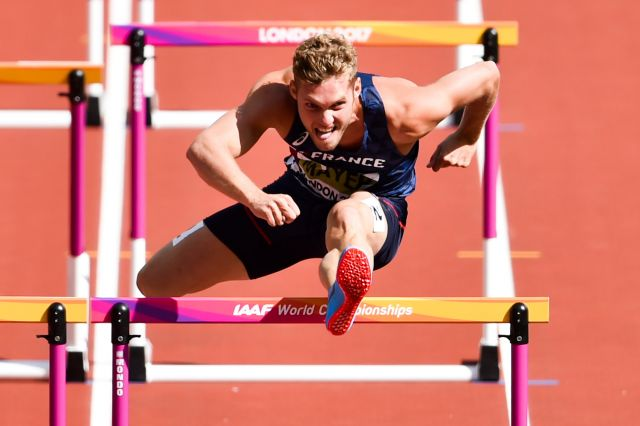
Mayer competing in the 110 metres hurdles at the 2017 World Championships in Athletics in London

On 15 April, he had his first outdoor competition at a triathlon (200m, high jump, discus throw) in L'Étang-Salé, Réunion. Mayer won all three events, finishing in first place with 2642 points. Mayer then took part in the decathlon in his adopted hometown of Montpellier on 13–14 May, and achieved a season best mark in discus and shot put. He also took part in the French Elite Outdoor Championships in Marseille on 14–15 July, but struggled in the rainy and windy conditions and finished the competition with a few no marks.

At the 2017 World Championships in Athletics in London, Mayer completed his first decathlon of the year and won his first World Championships gold medal with a world-leading score of 8768 points, ahead of Germans Rico Freimuth (silver, 8564 points) and Kai Kazmirek (bronze, 8488 points). This was also France's first international gold medal in the decathlon. Despite not coming first in any specific discipline, Mayer achieved new personal bests in the 100 metres (10.70s, 929 points), 400 metres (48.28s, 897 points), and the 110 metres hurdles (13.75, 1007 points). A setback in the pole vault – where he cleared his only mark at 5.10m only at the third and last try – 30 cm below his personal record – prevented him from breaking his personal record.

=== 2018: Indoor heptathlon gold and world decathlon record ===
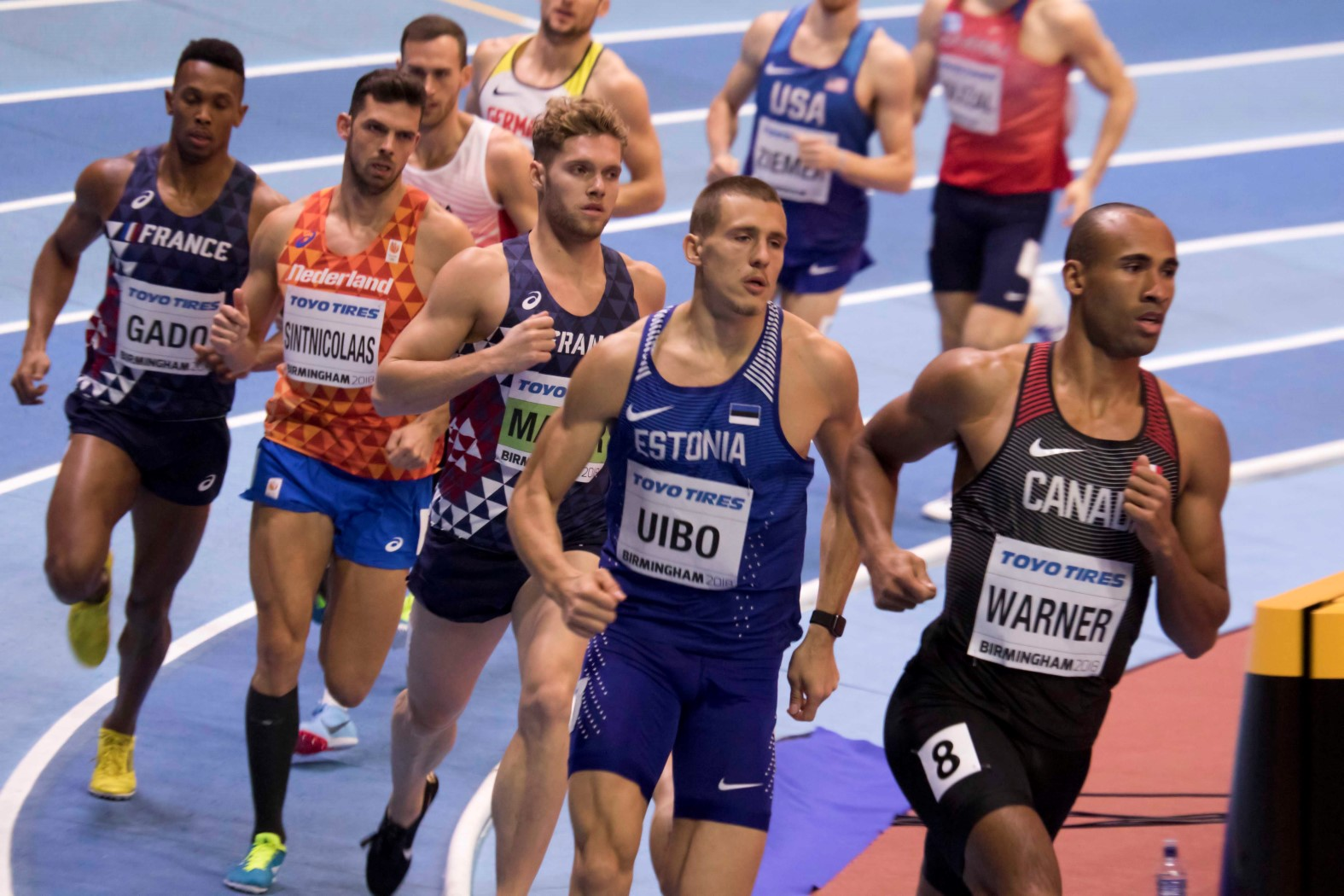
Mayer at the 2018 World Indoor Championships

In 2018, at the World Indoor Championships held in Birmingham, Mayer won gold in the heptathlon with 6348 points. In a closely fought contest, Mayer narrowly beat Damian Warner of Canada by five points to win his first world indoor title. He achieved his indoor personal best in the 60m and long jump. However, at the European Championships, he failed in the long jump with three fouls and did not finish the decathlon.

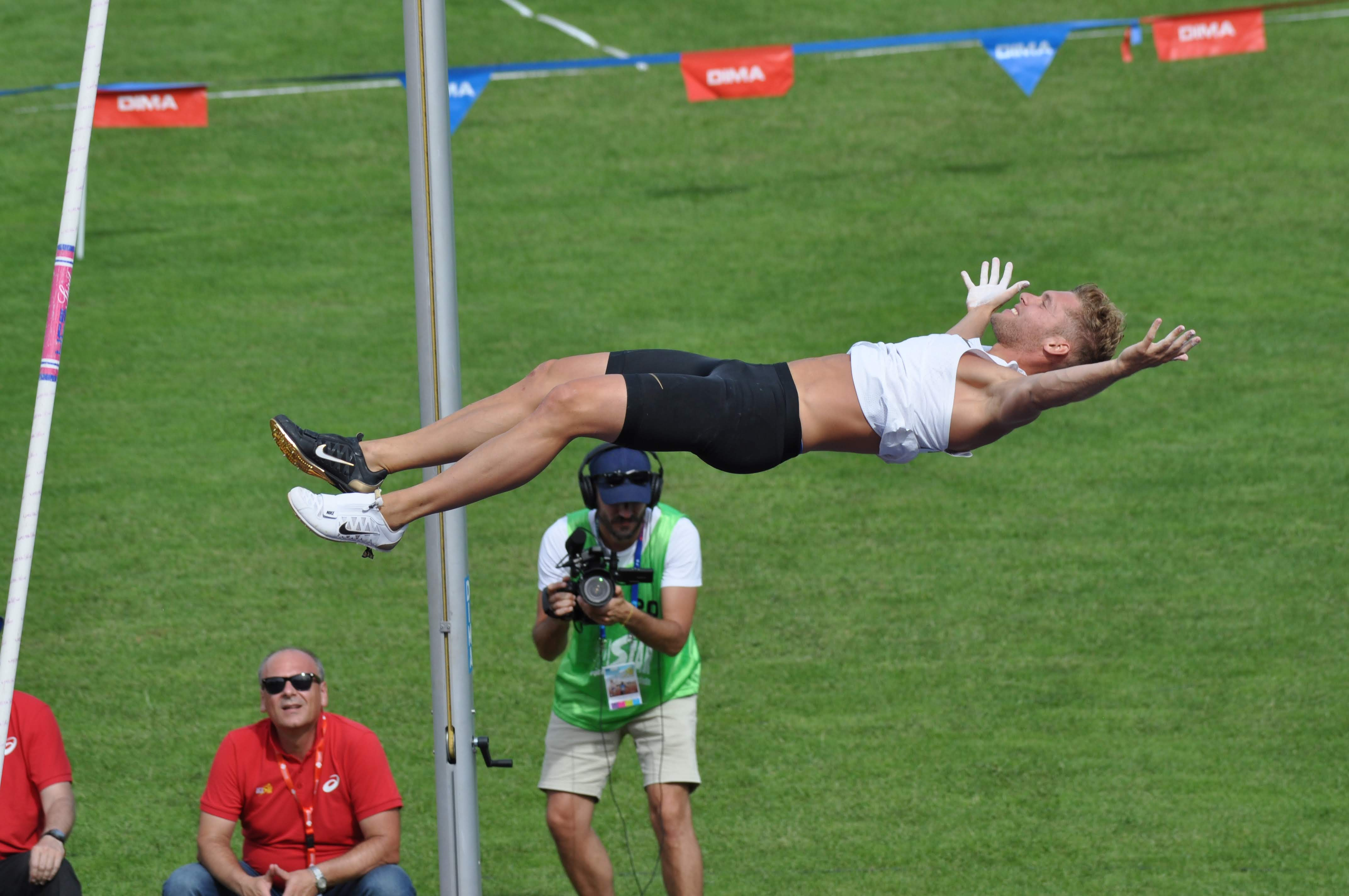
Mayer in pole vault at Décastar where he broke the world decathlon record in 2018

After the setback at the European Championships, Mayer took part at the Décastar held in Talence, France in September 2018. There Mayer broke Ashton Eaton's decathlon world record, establishing a new mark of 9126 points. Mayer started strongly in the first day, but at 4563 points was still 140 points behind Eaton's first day total. In the second day, he achieved his best-ever distance of 71.90m in the javelin and the best-ever height of 5.45m in the pole vault in a competition, as well as wins in the 110m hurdles and discus, allowing him to break the world record by 81 points.

=== 2019–2020 ===
Mayer did not defend his European heptathlon title at the 2019 Indoor Championships.

At the 2019 World Championships, Mayer suffered an injury and had to withdraw from the men's decathlon event. He achieved his personal best in 100m and shot put and was leading the competition after 7 events, but withdrew before the pole vault due to a problem with his Achilles.

=== 2021: Tokyo Olympics silver ===
At the 2021 European Athletics Indoor Championships held in Toruń, Poland, Mayer won the Men's heptathlon event with 6392 points.

At the 2020 Tokyo Olympics, Mayer started below expectation in the Men's decathlon, ending in 5th place after the first five events. However, in the final day, he performed well in a few events, such as the hurdle and pole vault as well as a personal best in javelin throw, which allowed him rise in the ranking and win a silver behind Damian Warner of Canada.

=== 2022: Second World gold ===
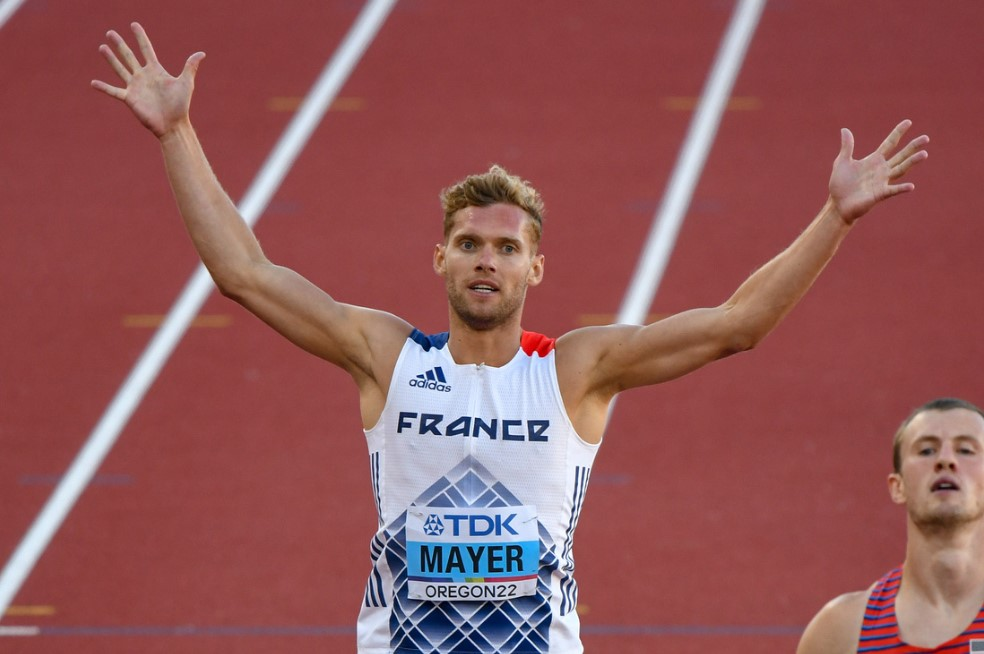
Mayer at the conclusion of the 1500 m of 2022 World Championships decathlon

Mayer did not compete in the 2022 World Athletics Indoor Championships due to an issue with his Achilles after catching Covid earlier.

At the World Championships held in Eugene, Oregon in July, Mayer regained his world title in Men's decathlon, during which Warner withdrew due to a hamstring injury. He again started poorly in 6th place after the first day, but gradually improved his position, and won in the last day with first place finishes in pole vault and javelin.

He withdrew from the decathlon at the 2022 European Athletics Championships after suffering a thigh injury in the first event.

=== 2023: Third European indoor gold ===
Kevin Mayer took part in the 2023 European Athletics Indoor Championships held in Istanbul in March 2023. On the first day of competition, he equaled his personal best in the 60m (6.85s), achieved 7.41m in the long jump, reached 15.81m in the shot put and cleared 1.98m in the high jump, ranking second in the general classification, 67 pts from the Norwegian Sander Skotheim. The second day, he won the 60-meter hurdles (7.76s), the pole vault (5.30 m) and managed to keep a lead of 30 points in the standings (6,348 pts against 6,318 pts) at the end of the 1,000 meters despite a slower time than his Norwegian opponent (2 min 37 s 82 against 2 min 44 s 20). He won a third European indoor heptathlon champion title after 2017 and 2021, equaling the performance of the Czech Roman Šebrle on the number of titles of this event.

Mayer went into the 2023 World Athletics Championships while suffering from pain in his left Achilles tendon. He eventually withdrew after the second event, the long jump, to focus on the 2024 Olympics to be held in Paris. A few days before the Olympic event was about to start in August 2024, Mayer withdrew from the competition due to a thigh injury. The injury also kept him out of the entire 2025 season.

== Achievements ==
Performance in major international events

Year	Competition	Venue	Position	Event	Notes
Representing France
2009	World Youth Championships	Brixen, Italy	1st	Octathlon	6478 pts
2010	World Junior Championships	Moncton, Canada	1st	Decathlon	7928 pts
2011	European Junior Championships	Tallinn, Estonia	1st	Decathlon	8124 pts
2012	Olympic Games	London, United Kingdom	15th	Decathlon	7952 pts
2013	European Indoor Championships	Gothenburg, Sweden	2nd	Heptathlon	6297 pts
2013	World Championships	Moscow, Russia	4th	Decathlon	8446 pts
2014	European Championships	Zürich, Switzerland	2nd	Decathlon	8521 pts
2016	Olympic Games	Rio de Janeiro, Brazil	2nd	Decathlon	8834 pts
2017	European Indoor Championships	Belgrade, Serbia	1st	Heptathlon	6479 pts
2017	World Championships	London, United Kingdom	1st	Decathlon	8768 pts
2018	World Indoor Championships	Birmingham, United Kingdom	1st	Heptathlon	6348 pts
2018	European Championships	Berlin, Germany	–	Decathlon	DNF
2019	World Championships	Doha, Qatar	–	Decathlon	DNF
2021	European Indoor Championships	Toruń, Poland	1st	Heptathlon	6392 pts
2021	Olympic Games	Tokyo, Japan	2nd	Decathlon	8726 pts
2022	World Championships	Eugene, United States	1st	Decathlon	8816 pts
2022	European Championships	Munich, Germany	–	Decathlon	DNF
2023	European Indoor Championships	Istanbul, Turkey	1st	Heptathlon	6348 pts
2023	World Championships	Budapest, Hungary	—	Decathlon	DNF
2024	European Championships	Rome, Italy	5th	Decathlon	8476 pts

List of senior decathlons with results over 8000 points

Year	Competition	Location	Position	Points
2012	Côte d'Azur Combined Events Regional Championships	Cannes-La Bocca, France	1st	8091
2012	Brussels Meeting	Brussels, Belgium	1st	8447
2013	European Cup Combined Events – Super League	Tallinn, Estonia	1st	8390
2013	World Championships	Moscow, Russia	4th	8446
2014	Mehrkampf-Meeting	Ratingen, Germany	2nd	8323
2014	European Championships	Zürich, Switzerland	2nd	8521
2015	Arona Combined Events Meeting	Arona, Spain	1st	8469 (MR)
2016	Hypo-Meeting	Götzis, Austria	2nd	8446
2016	Olympic Games	Rio de Janeiro, Brazil	2nd	8834 (NR)
2017	World Championships	London, United Kingdom	1st	8768
2018	Décastar	Talence, France	1st	9126 (WR)
2020	Meeting de la Réunion	St-Paul, France	1st	8552
2021	The XXXII Olympic Games	Tokyo, Japan	2nd	8726
2022	World Athletics Championships	Eugene, United States	1st	8816

List of senior heptathlons with results over 5800 points

Year	Competition	Location	Position	Points
2013	French Indoor Championships	Aubière, France	2nd	5983
2013	European Indoor Championships	Gothenburg, Sweden	2nd	6297
2017	European Indoor Championships	Belgrade, Serbia	1st	6479 (AR)
2018	World Athletics Indoor Championships	Birmingham, Great Britain	1st	6348
2021	European Athletics Indoor Championships	Toruń, Poland	1st	6392
2023	European Athletics Indoor Championships	Istanbul, Turkey	1st	6348

== Personal bests ==
Information from World Athletics profile unless otherwise noted.

Outdoor

Individual events
Event	Performance	Location	Date
Long jump	7.51 m (24 ft 7 1/2 in) (+0.4 m/s)	Monaco	15 July 2016
High jump	2.04 m (6 ft 8 1/4 in)	Romans-sur-Isère	24 June 2008
Pole vault	5.40 m (17 ft 8 1/2 in)	Bourg-en-Bresse	20 May 2018
100 metres	10.77 (+0.9 m/s)	Montpellier	30 July 2020
200 metres	21.76 (−1.0 m/s)	L'Étang-Salé	15 April 2017
400 metres	54.57	Annecy	7 May 2017
110 metres hurdles	13.60 (+1.5 m/s)	Saint-Étienne	27 July 2019
110 metres hurdles	13.49 (+3.0 m/s)	Saint-Étienne	28 July 2019
Shot put	16.08 m (52 ft 9 in)	Albi	12 September 2020
Discus throw	50.13 m (164 ft 5 1/2 in)	Valence	21 May 2017
Javelin throw	70.54 m (231 ft 5 in)	Paris	1 July 2017

Combined events
Event	Performance	Location	Date	Score
Decathlon	—N/a	Talence	15–16 September 2018	9,126 points
100 metres	10.50 (+0.8 m/s)	Doha	2 October 2019	975 points
Long jump	7.80 m (25 ft 7 in) (+1.2 m/s)	Talence	15 September 2018	1,010 points
Shot put	16.20 m (53 ft 1 3/4 in)	Saint-Paul	18 December 2020	864 points
High jump	2.09 m (6 ft 10 1/4 in)	Brussels	30 June 2012	887 points
400 metres	48.26	London	11 August 2017	897 points
110 metres hurdles	13.54 (+1.8 m/s)	Saint-Paul	19 December 2020	1,035 points
Discus throw	52.38 m (171 ft 10 in)	Ratingen	17 June 2018	920 points
Pole vault	5.45 m (17 ft 10 1/2 in)	Talence	16 September 2018	1,051 points
Javelin throw	73.09 m (239 ft 9 1/2 in)	Tokyo	5 August 2021	937 points
1500 metres	4:18.04	Brussels	1 July 2012	825 points
Virtual Best Performance				9,401 points

Indoor

Individual events
Event	Performance	Location	Date
Long jump	7.48 m (24 ft 6 1/4 in)	Paris	7 February 2018
High jump	2.10 m (6 ft 10 1/2 in)	Aubiére	13 February 2010
Pole vault	5.60 m (18 ft 4 1/4 in)	Rouen	10 February 2018
60 metres	6.89	Val-de-Reuil	14 February 2022
1000 metres	2:43.92	Lyon	4 February 2018
60 metres hurdles	7.68	Liévin	9 February 2021
Shot put	16.08 m (52 ft 9 in)	Miramas	3 February 2023

Combined events
Event	Performance	Location	Date	Score
Heptathlon	—N/a	Belgrade	4–5 March 2017	6,479 points (Note: European heptathlon best)
60 metres	6.85	Birmingham	2 March 2018	936 points
Long jump	7.55 m (24 ft 9 in)	Birmingham	2 March 2018	947 points
Shot put	16.32 m (53 ft 6 1/2 in)	Toruń	6 March 2021	871 points
High jump	2.10 m (6 ft 10 1/2 in)	Belgrade	4 March 2017	896 points
60 metres hurdles	7.73	Aubière	30 January 2022	1,051 points
Pole vault	5.40 m (17 ft 8 1/2 in)	Belgrade	5 March 2017	1,035 points
1000 metres	2:37.30	Gothenburg	3 March 2013	904 points
Virtual Best Performance				6,640 points

== Personal life ==
Mayer was born on 10 February 1992 in Argenteuil, a commune in the northwest suburbs of Paris, to André and Carole Mayer. His paternal family and German surname have their origin in Farschviller, in the northeastern region of Lorraine, (Note: Now part of the Grand Est region.) where his father grew up; some of his relatives still live in the Moselle department next to the border with Germany. He has three brothers: Thibault, Thomas and Sébastien; the family was raised in La Roche-de-Glun, a small town by the Rhône river in the southeast of the country (Drôme department), where his parents still live.

Mayer started practicing athletics at the sports association EA Tain-Tournon close to his hometown; after the club's merger with two other Drôme-based athletics associations in 2013, Mayer continued representing it through the new institution, EA Rhône Vercors 26-07. He trains at the CREPS Montpellier, a training center for high-performance athletes, since 2008; ever since moving to Montpellier, he has been coached by Bertrand Valcin. He studied for a Diplôme universitaire de technologie en mesures physiques (a technology-based degree in physical measurements, including metrology and instrumentation) at the University of Montpellier-Sète.

== Notes ==
Records
Preceded by (Czech Republic) Roman Šebrle	Men's heptathlon European record holder 5 March 2017 –	Succeeded by Incumbent
Preceded by (United States) Ashton Eaton	Men's decathlon World record holder 16 September 2018 –	Succeeded by Incumbent
Preceded by (Czech Republic) Roman Šebrle	Men's decathlon European record holder 16 September 2018 –	Succeeded by Incumbent
Awards and achievements
Preceded by Teddy Riner	French Sportsman of the Year; 2018	Succeeded by Julian Alaphilippe
