= Arthur Abele =

German decathlete (born 1986)

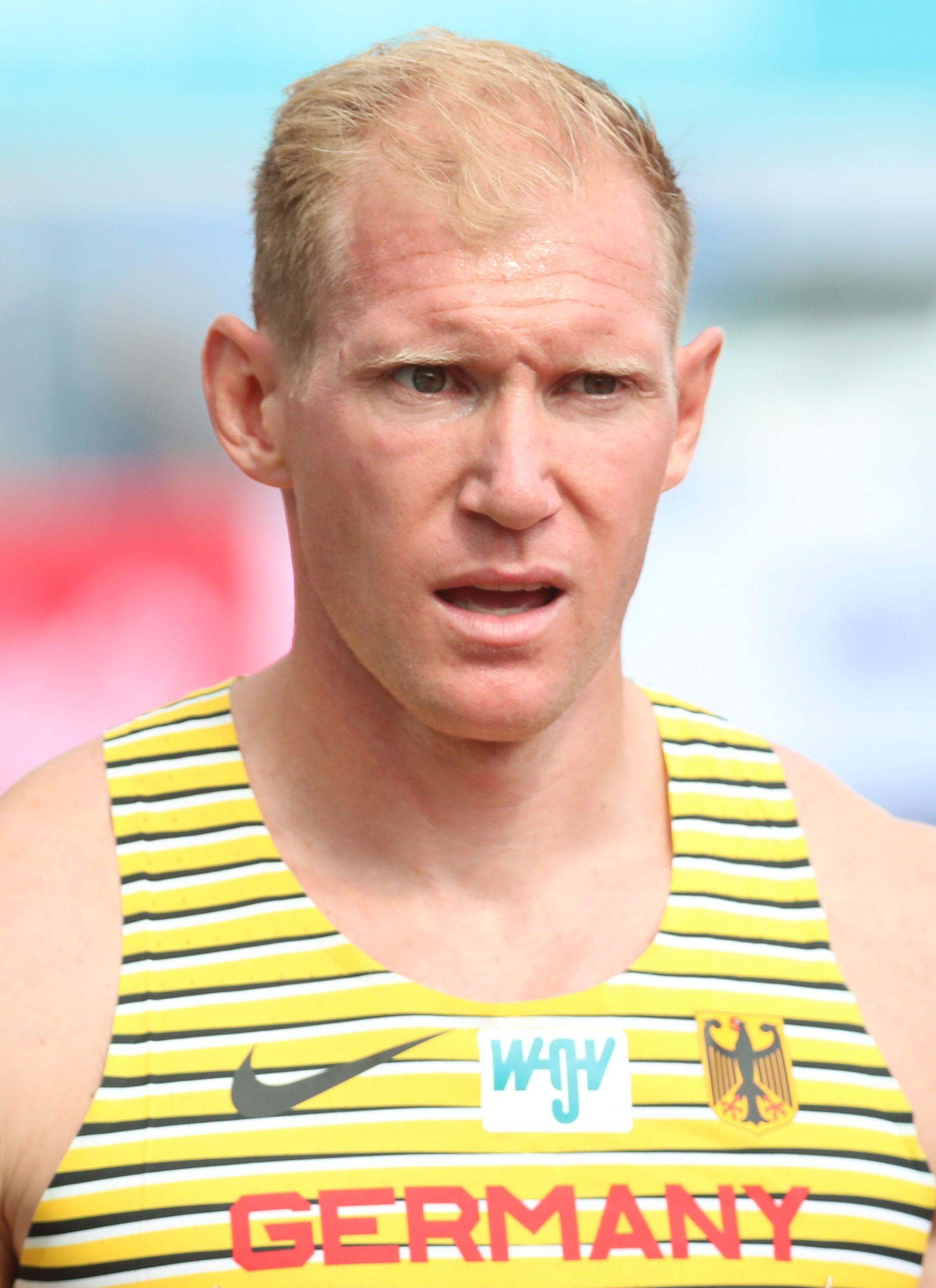
- Abele in 2022

Personal information
- Born: 30 July 1986 (age 39) Mutlangen, Baden-Württemberg, Germany
- Height: 1.84 m (6 ft 0 in)
- Weight: 85 kg (187 lb)

Sport
- Country: Germany
- Sport: Athletics
- Event: Decathlon
Medal record
European Championships
Gold medal – first place	2018 Berlin	Decathlon
European Indoor Championships
Silver medal – second place	2015 Praha	Heptathlon

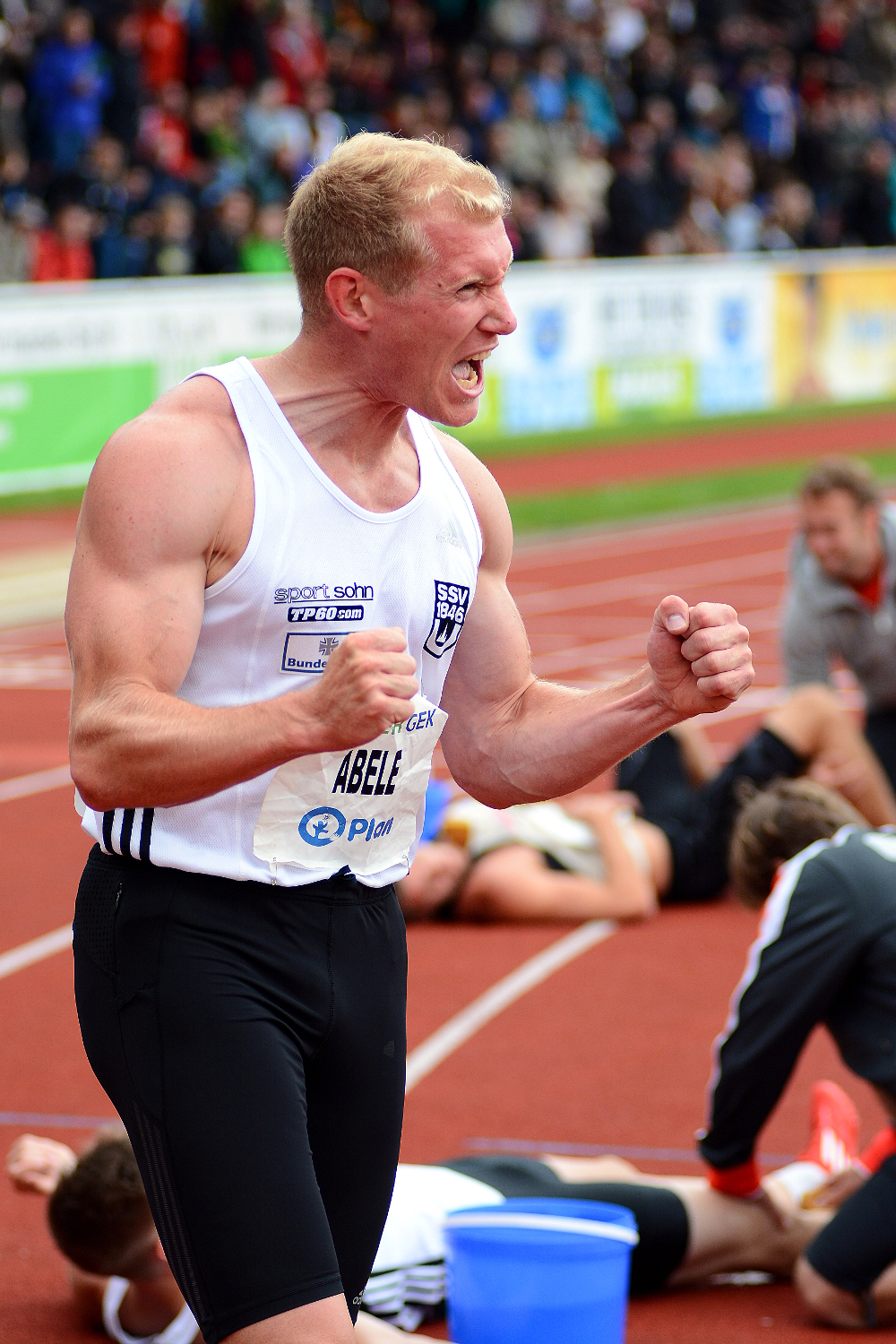
Abele in 2014

Arthur Abele (born 30 July 1986 in Mutlangen, Baden-Württemberg) is a German decathlete who is the reigning European champion, winning the gold medal at the 2018 European Championships. He competed at the 2008 and 2016 Summer Olympics. Arthur Abele won gold in the Men's decathlon in the European Championships on 8 August 2018 in Berlin, Germany.

== Achievements ==
Year	Competition	Venue	Position	Event	Notes
Representing Germany
2004	World Junior Championships	Grosseto, Italy	7th	Decathlon (junior)	7224 pts
2007	Hypo-Meeting	Götzis, Austria	—	Decathlon	DNF
2007	World Championships	Osaka, Japan	9th	Decathlon	8243 pts
2008	Hypo-Meeting	Götzis, Austria	7th	Decathlon	8220 pts
2008	Olympic Games	Beijing, PR China	—	Decathlon	DNF
2014	European Championships	Zürich, Switzerland	5th	Decathlon	8477 pts
2015	European Indoor Championships	Prague, Czech Republic	2nd	Heptathlon	6279 pts
2016	Olympic Games	Rio de Janeiro, Brazil	15th	Decathlon	8013 pts
2018	European Championships	Berlin, Germany	1st	Decathlon	8431 pts
2022	European Championships	Munich, Germany	15th	Decathlon	7662 pts
