= Elmo Savola =

Finnish decathlete (born 1995)

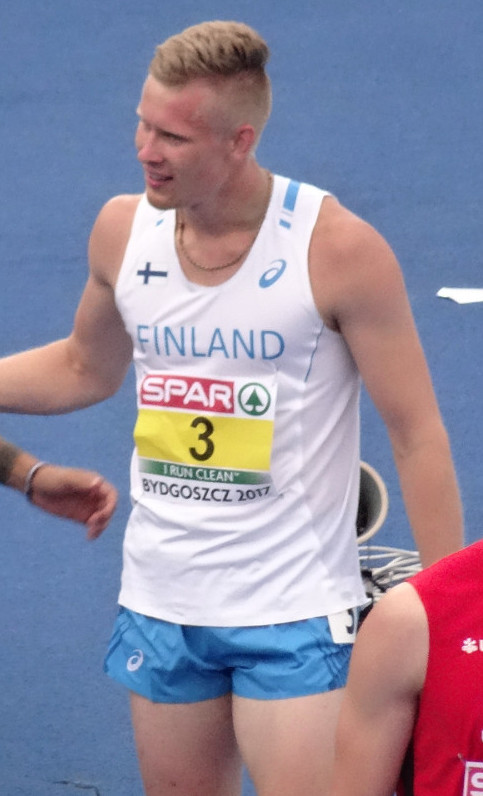
- Elmo Savola in 2017

Personal information
- Born: 10 March 1995 (age 31) Lappajärvi, Finland

Sport
- Sport: Athletics
- Event: Decathlon
- Club: Lappajärven Veikot
- Coached by: Raine Savola

Elmo Savola (born 10 March 1995) is a Finnish athlete competing in the combined events. He won a bronze medal in the decathlon at the 2017 European U23 Championships.

== International competitions ==
| Year | Competition | Venue | Position | Event | Notes |
Representing Finland
| 2013 | European Junior Championships | Rieti, Italy | – | Decathlon (junior) | DNF |
| 2014 | World Junior Championships | Eugene, United States | 17th | Decathlon (junior) | 7278 pts |
| 2015 | European U23 Championships | Tallinn, Estonia | 7th | Decathlon | 7743 pts |
| 2017 | European U23 Championships | Bydgoszcz, Poland | 3rd | Decathlon | 7956 pts |
| 2018 | European Championships | Berlin, Germany | 15th | Decathlon | 7655 pts |

== Personal bests ==
Outdoor

- 100 metres – 10.83 (+1.3 m/s, Götzis 2016)
- 400 metres – 48.84 (Kuortane 2017)
- 1500 metres – 4:39.50 (Bydgoszcz 2017)
- 110 metres hurdles – 14.21 (+1.7 m/s, Bydgoszcz 2017)
- High jump – 1.99 (Pori 2015)
- Pole vault – 4.80 (Berlin 2018)
- Long jump – 7.29 (-0.6 m/s, Bydgoszcz 2017)
- Shot put – 14.01 (Jyväskylä 2018)
- Discus throw – 43.65 (Götzis 2016)
- Javelin throw – 63.28 (Oulu 2016)
- Decathlon – 7956 (Bydgoszcz 2017)

Indoor

- 60 metres – 7.07 (Kuortane 2018)
- 1000 metres – 2:50.93 (Jyväskylä 2018)
- 60 metres hurdles – 8.13 (Tampere 2016)
- High jump – 2.02 (Kuortane 2016)
- Pole vault – 4.67 (Tallinn 2017)
- Long jump – 7.07 (Jyväskylä 2018)
- Shot put – 14.08 (Jyväskylä 2018)
- Heptathlon – 5639 (Jyväskylä 2018)
