= Pieter Braun =

Dutch athlete

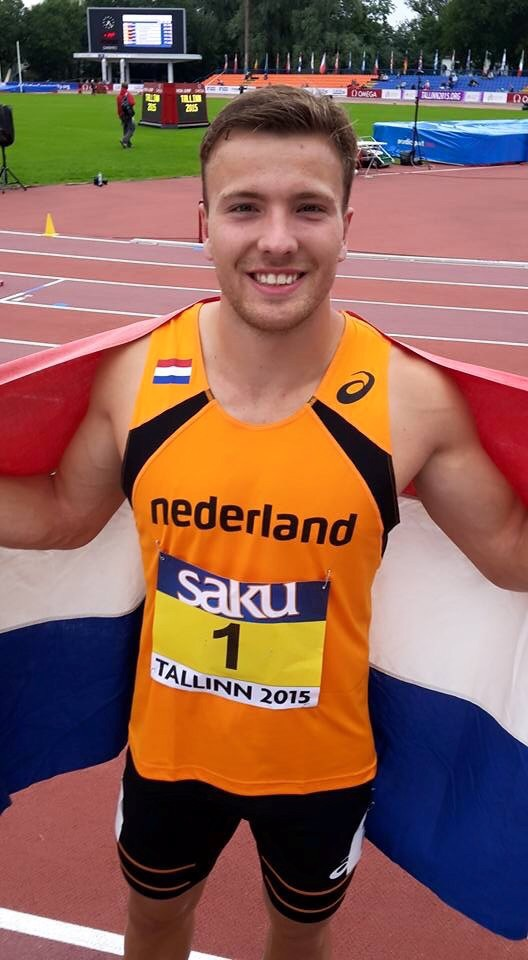
- Pieter Braun in 2015

Personal information
- Born: 21 January 1993 (age 33) Terheijden, Netherlands
- Height: 1.86 m (6 ft 1 in)
- Weight: 83 kg (183 lb)

Sport
- Sport: Track and field
- Event: Decathlon
- Coached by: Vince de Lange

Pieter Braun (born 21 January 1993 in Terheijden) is a Dutch athlete competing in the combined events. He won the gold medal at the 2015 European U23 Championships. He also competed in the decathlon in the 2016 Summer Olympics.

== Competition record ==
| Year | Competition | Venue | Position | Event | Notes |
Representing the Netherlands
| 2012 | World Junior Championships | Barcelona, Spain | 16th | Decathlon (junior) | 7055 pts |
| 2013 | European U23 Championships | Tampere, Finland | 11th | Decathlon | 7540 pts |
| 2015 | European Indoor Championships | Prague, Czech Republic | 12th | Heptathlon | 4832 pts |
| 2015 | European U23 Championships | Tallinn, Estonia | 1st | Decathlon | 8195 pts |
| 2015 | World Championships | Beijing, China | 12th | Decathlon | 8114 pts |
| 2016 | European Championships | Amsterdam, Netherlands | 7th | Decathlon | 7945 pts |
| 2016 | Olympic Games | Rio de Janeiro, Brazil | – | Decathlon | DNF |
| 2017 | World Championships | London, United Kingdom | 16th | Decathlon | 7890 pts |
| 2018 | European Championships | Berlin, Germany | 7th | Decathlon | 8105 pts |
| 2019 | World Championships | Doha, Qatar | 7th | Decathlon | 8222 pts |
| 2021 | European Indoor Championships | Toruń, Poland | – | Heptathlon | DNF |

== Personal bests ==
Outdoor

- 100 metres – 10.90 (+0.5 m/s) (Götzis 2017)
- 400 metres – 48.02 (Tallinn 2015)
- 1500 metres – 4:24.29 (Götzis 2018)
- 110 metres hurdles – 14.13 (+0.7 m/s) (Tallinn 2015)
- High jump – 2.04 (Beijing 2015)
- Pole vault – 5.05 (Amsterdam 2016)
- Long jump – 7.71 (+0.5 m/s) (Götzis 2017)
- Shot put – 15.28 (Götzis 2018)
- Discus throw – 47.33 (Vught 2018)
- Javelin throw – 64.19 (Götzis 2019)
- Decathlon – 8.342 (Götzis 2019)

Indoor

- 60 metres – 7.21 (Dortmund 2016)
- 1000 metres – 2:40.19 (Sheffield 2014)
- 60 metres hurdles – 8.08 (Apeldoorn 2016)
- High jump – 2.02 (Apeldoorn 2014)
- Pole vault – 5.04 (Apeldoorn 2016)
- Long jump – 7.47 (Apeldoorn 2018)
- Shot put – 14.44 (Apeldoorn 2017)
- Heptathlon – 5837 (Apeldoorn 2015)
