= Fredrik Samuelsson (decathlete) =

Swedish decathlete

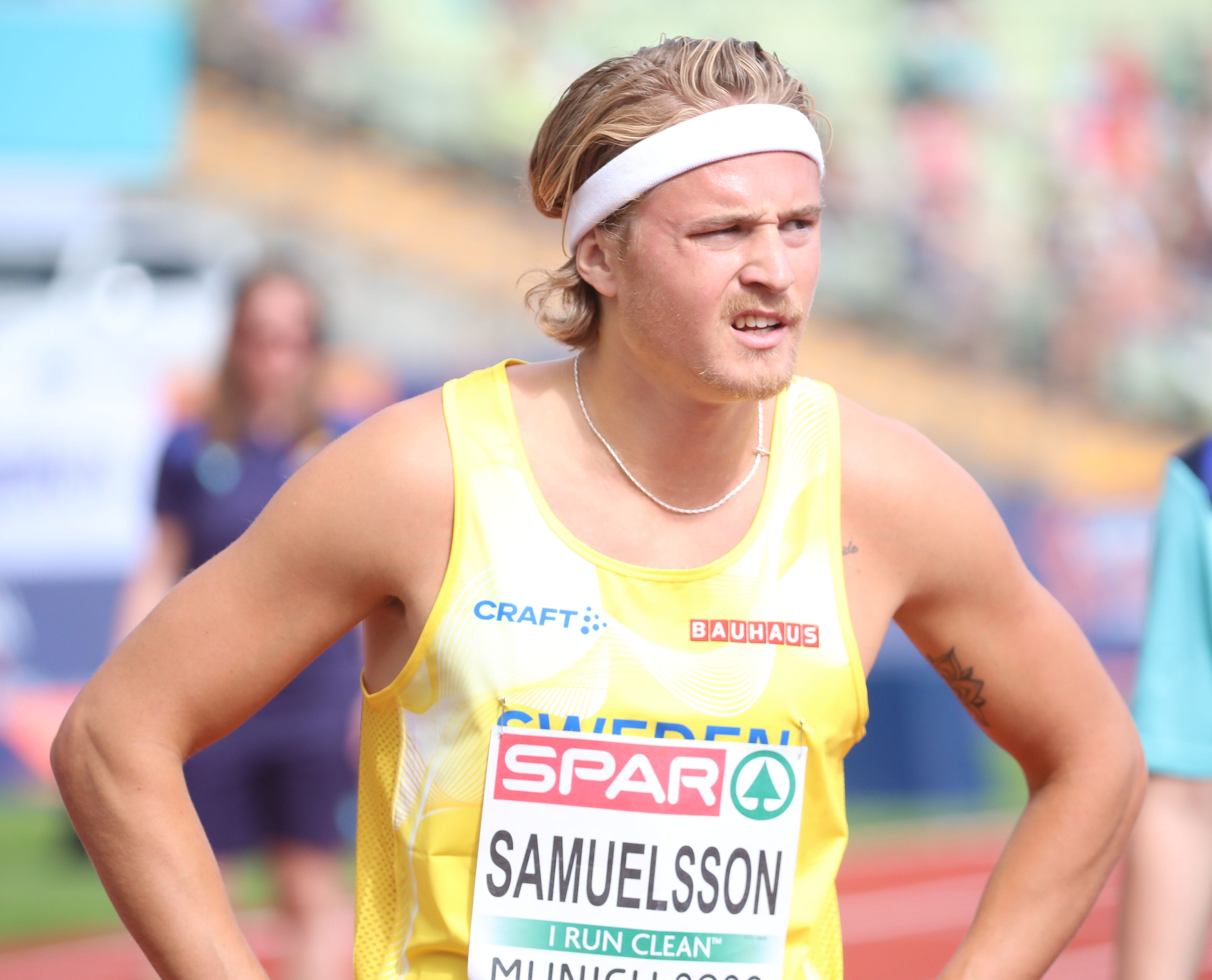
- Fredrik Samuelsson in 2022

Personal information
- Born: 16 February 1995 (age 31)
- Height: 185 cm (6 ft 1 in)
- Weight: 80 kg (180 lb)
- Website: www.sampadecathlon.se

Sport
- Sport: Athletics
- Event(s): Decathlon, Heptathlon
- Club: Hässelby SK

Achievements and titles
- Personal best(s): Decathlon: 8,178 (2023); Heptathlon: 6,125 (2019)

Fredrik Samuelsson (born 16 February 1995) is a Swedish decathlete. He represented his country at the 2017 World Championships dropping out after three events. His biggest success to date is the silver medal at the 2017 European U23 Championships.

In May 2025, Samuelsson suffered a thigh injury, causing him to miss the 2025 Hypo-Meeting in Götzis.

== International competitions ==
Year	Competition	Venue	Position	Event	Notes
Representing Sweden
2013	European Junior Championships	Rieti	7th	Decathlon (junior)	7542 pts
2014	World Junior Championships	Eugene	12th	Decathlon (junior)	7513 pts
2015	European U23 Championships	Tallinn	5th	Decathlon	7884 pts
2016	European Championships	Amsterdam	10th	Decathlon	7875 pts
2017	European Indoor Championships	Belgrade	5th	Heptathlon	6015 pts
2017	European U23 Championships	Bydgoszcz	2nd	Decathlon	8010 pts
2017	World Championships	London	–	Decathlon	DNF
2018	European Championships	Berlin	9th	Decathlon	8005 pts
2019	European Indoor Championships	Glasgow	4th	Heptathlon	6125 pts
2019	World Championships	Doha	15th	Decathlon	7860 pts
2022	European Championships	Munich	13th	Decathlon	7757 pts

== Personal bests ==
=== Outdoor ===
As of 19 June 2025

Event	Performance	Location	Date	Points
Decathlon	—N/a	Götzis	27–28 May 2023	8,178 points
100 metres	10.81 (+1.4 m/s)	Götzis	27 May 2017	903 points
Long jump	7.81 m (25 ft 7 1/4 in) (-1.2 m/s)	Tallinn	11 July 2015	1,012 points
Shot put	14.93 m (48 ft 11 3/4 in)	Falun	17 August 2019	785 points
High jump	2.08 m (6 ft 9 3/4 in)	Berlin	7 August 2018	878 points
400 metres	48.99	Bydgoszcz	15 July 2017	862 points
110 metres hurdles	14.10 (+1.4 m/s)	Götzis	28 May 2017	962 points
Discus throw	46.01 m (150 ft 11 1/4 in)	Gothenburg	18 April 2021	788 points
Pole vault	5.00 m (16 ft 4 3/4 in)	Götzis	28 May 2017	910 points
Javelin throw	65.00 m (213 ft 3 in)	Götzis	30 May 2021	813 points
1500 metres	4:33.99	Götzis	26 May 2019	719 points
Virtual Best Performance				8,632 points

=== Indoor ===
As of 19 June 2025

Event	Performance	Location	Date	Points
Heptathlon	—N/a	Glasgow	2–3 March 2019	6,125 points
60 metres	7.05	Sätra	12 January 2019	865 points
Long jump	7.66 m (25 ft 1 1/2 in)	Tallinn	11 July 2015	975 points
Shot put	14.69 m (48 ft 2 1/4 in)	Glasgow	2 March 2019	771 points
High jump	2.08 m (6 ft 9 3/4 in)	Berlin	7 August 2018	878 points
60 metres hurdles	8.07	Malmö	19 February 2023	964 points
Pole vault	5.00 m (16 ft 4 3/4 in)	Belgrade	5 March 2017	910 points
1000 metres	2:42.97	Belgrade	5 March 2017	841 points
Virtual Best Performance				6,204 points
