= Paweł Wiesiołek =

Polish decathlete

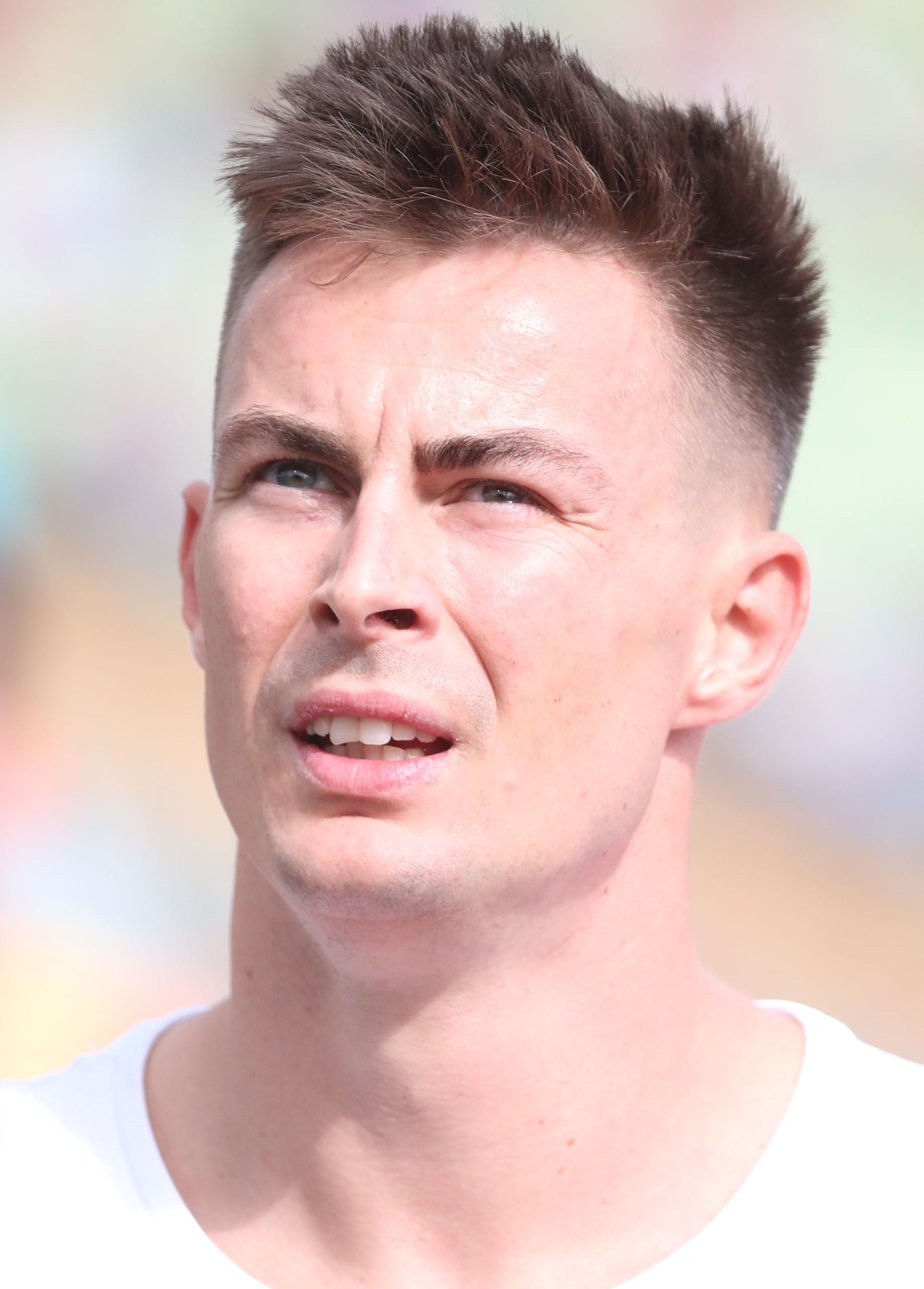
- Wiesiołek in 2022

Personal information
- Born: 13 August 1991 (age 34) Wyszków, Poland
- Height: 1.94 m (6 ft 4 in)
- Weight: 82 kg (181 lb)

Sport
- Sport: Track and field
- Event: Decathlon
- Club: KS Warszawianka
- Coached by: Marek Rzepka
Medal record
Representing Poland
European Indoor Championships
Bronze medal – third place	2021 Toruń	Heptathlon

Paweł Wiesiołek (born 13 August 1991) is a Polish athlete competing in the decathlon. He represented his country at the 2015 World Championships in Beijing finishing 17th and competed in the 2016 Summer Olympics.

His main personal bests are 8204 points in the decathlon (Kraków 2019) and 6133 points in the indoor heptathlon (Toruń 2021).

== Competition record ==
Year	Competition	Venue	Position	Event	Notes
Representing Poland
2013	European U23 Championships	Tampere, Finland	10th	Decathlon	7547 pts
2015	European Indoor Championships	Prague, Czech Republic	–	Heptathlon	DNF
2015	World Championships	Beijing, China	17th	Decathlon	7705 pts
2016	European Championships	Amsterdam, Netherlands	–	Decathlon	DNF
2016	Olympic Games	Rio de Janeiro, Brazil	21st	Decathlon	7784 pts
2018	European Championships	Berlin, Germany	13th	Decathlon	7696 pts
2019	World Championships	Doha, Qatar	12th	Decathlon	8064 pts
2021	European Indoor Championships	Toruń, Poland	3rd	Heptathlon	6133 pts
2021	Olympic Games	Tokyo, Japan	12th	Decathlon	8176 pts
2022	European Championships	Munich, Germany	–	Decathlon	DNF
2024	European Championships	Rome, Italy	17th	Decathlon	7707 pts

== Personal bests ==
Outdoor

- 100 metres – 10.74 (+1.0 m/s) (Warsaw 2016)
- 400 metres – 48.55 (Beijing 2015)
- 1500 metres – 4:31.34 (Cracow 2019)
- 110 metres hurdles – 14.28 (+0.7 m/s) (Warsaw 2017)
- High jump – 2.12 (Götzis 2017)
- Pole vault – 5.00 (Warsaw 2020)
- Long jump – 7.61 (+1.0 m/s) (Götzis 2015)
- Shot put – 15.26 (Doha 2019)
- Discus throw – 50.30 (Warsaw 2019)
- Javelin throw – 61.36 (Warsaw 2015)
- Decathlon – 8204 (Cracow 2019)

Indoor

- 60 metres – 6.94 (Toruń 2021)
- 1000 metres – 2:41.39 (Spała 2015)
- 60 metres hurdles – 8.10 (Spała 2015)
- High jump – 2.07 (Spała 2013)
- Pole vault – 5.20 (Toruń 2021)
- Long jump – 7.63 (Prague 2015)
- Shot put – 15.63 (Toruń 2021)
- Heptathlon – 6133 (Toruń 2021)
