= 2022 World Athletics Indoor Championships – Men's heptathlon =

Men's heptathlon at the 2022 World Athletics Indoor Championships
- Venue: Štark Arena
- Dates: 18–19 March
- Competitors: 12 from 9 nations
- Winning points: 6489

Medalists
gold medal	Damian Warner	Canada
silver medal	Simon Ehammer	Switzerland
bronze medal	Ashley Moloney	Australia

The men's heptathlon at the 2022 World Athletics Indoor Championships took place on 18-19 March 2022.

The winning margin was 126 points. The gold medallist achieved the best score in three of the seven events.

== Results ==
=== 60 metres ===
The 60 metres were started at 9:56.

Rank	Heat	Name	Nationality	Time	Points	Notes
1	2	Damian Warner	Canada	6.68	999	PB
2	1	Ashley Moloney	Australia	6.70	992	PB
3	2	Simon Ehammer	Switzerland	6.72	984	PB
4	2	Garrett Scantling	United States	6.84	940	PB
5	2	Hans-Christian Hausenberg	Estonia	6.86	933	
6	1	Lindon Victor	Grenada	6.91	915	PB
7	2	Steven Bastien	United States	6.94	904	SB
8	2	Jorge Ureña	Spain	6.95	900	
9	1	Andri Oberholzer	Switzerland	7.00	882	PB
10	1	Dario Dester	Italy	7.01	879	
11	1	Karel Tilga	Estonia	7.07	858	PB
12	1	Kai Kazmirek	Germany	7.22	806	SB

=== Long jump ===
The Long jump was started at 10:40.

Rank	Name	Nationality	#1	#2	#3	Result	Points	Notes	Total
1	Damian Warner	Canada	x	8.05	x	8.05	1073	SB	2072
2	Simon Ehammer	Switzerland	8.04	7.87	7.98	8.04	1071		2055
3	Hans-Christian Hausenberg	Estonia	7.96	x	x	7.96	1050	PB	1983
4	Ashley Moloney	Australia	7.66	7.56	7.82	7.82	1015	PB	2007
5	Andri Oberholzer	Switzerland	7.18	7.42	7.57	7.57	952	PB	1834
6	Steven Bastien	United States	7.27	x	7.56	7.56	950	SB	1854
7	Lindon Victor	Grenada	7.12	7.56	x	7.56	950	PB	1865
8	Karel Tilga	Estonia	7.25	7.20	7.54	7.54	945	SB	1803
9	Garrett Scantling	United States	7.28	7.40	7.30	7.40	910	SB	1850
10	Jorge Ureña	Spain	7.33	7.29	x	7.33	893		1793
11	Dario Dester	Italy	7.02	7.11	7.30	7.30	886		1765
12	Kai Kazmirek	Germany	6.66	6.95	6.93	6.95	802	SB	1608

=== Shot put ===
The shot put was started at 12:06.

Rank	Name	Nationality	#1	#2	#3	Result	Points	Notes	Total
1	Garrett Scantling	United States	16.37	15.99	16.37	16.37	874	PB	2724
2	Lindon Victor	Grenada	14.82	x	15.65	15.65	830	SB	2695
3	Karel Tilga	Estonia	13.83	14.84	15.36	15.36	812		2615
4	Damian Warner	Canada	14.37	14.52	14.89	14.89	783		2855
5	Andri Oberholzer	Switzerland	14.76	13.91	13.86	14.76	775		2609
6	Simon Ehammer	Switzerland	14.03	14.23	13.98	14.23	742	SB	2797
7	Dario Dester	Italy	13.62	13.78	14.03	14.03	730	SB	2495
8	Jorge Ureña	Spain	13.41	13.90	13.89	13.90	722		2515
9	Ashley Moloney	Australia	13.87	13.89	13.46	13.89	722	SB	2729
10	Hans-Christian Hausenberg	Estonia	12.45	13.62	x	13.62	705		2688
11	Kai Kazmirek	Germany	12.89	13.13	13.40	13.40	692	SB	2300
12	Steven Bastien	United States	x	13.19	x	13.19	679	SB	2533

=== High jump ===
The high jump was started at 19:05.

Rank	Name	Nationality	1.84	1.87	1.90	1.93	1.96	1.99	2.02	2.05	2.08	2.11	Result	Points	Notes	Total
1	Steven Bastien	United States	–	–	–	o	–	o	xo	xxo	xxo	xxx	2.08	878	PB	3411
2	Lindon Victor	Grenada	–	–	o	o	o	xo	o	o	xxx		2.05	850	SB	3545
3	Simon Ehammer	Switzerland	–	–	o	o	o	xo	xo	xo	xxx		2.05	850	PB	3647
4	Jorge Ureña	Spain	–	–	xo	–	xo	–	xo	xxo	xxx		2.05	850	SB	3365
5	Hans-Christian Hausenberg	Estonia	–	o	–	o	o	o	o	xxx			2.02	822		3510
6	Garrett Scantling	United States	–	–	–	o	–	xxo	o	xxx			2.02	822		3546
7	Ashley Moloney	Australia	–	–	o	–	o	–	xo	r			2.02	822		3551
8	Karel Tilga	Estonia	–	–	–	o	xxo	xo	xo	xr			2.02	822	SB	3437
9	Damian Warner	Canada	–	–	–	o	o	o	xxx				1.99	794	SB	3649
10	Andri Oberholzer	Switzerland	–	–	o	o	o	xo	xxx				1.99	794		3403
11	Dario Dester	Italy	o	–	o	xxo	xxo	xxx					1.96	767		3262
	Kai Kazmirek	Germany	did not start													

=== 60 metres hurdles ===
The 60 metres hurdles were started at 9:33.

Rank	Heat	Name	Nationality	Time	Points	Notes	Total
1	2	Damian Warner	Canada	7.61	1082	CHB	4731
2	2	Simon Ehammer	Switzerland	7.75	1046		4693
3	2	Ashley Moloney	Australia	7.88	1012	PB	4563
4	2	Jorge Ureña	Spain	7.98	987		4352
5	2	Hans-Christian Hausenberg	Estonia	7.99	984		4494
6	1	Andri Oberholzer	Switzerland	8.12	952	PB	4355
7	1	Dario Dester	Italy	8.12	952		4214
8	1	Steven Bastien	United States	8.14	947		4358
9	1	Karel Tilga	Estonia	8.39	886		4323
10	1	Lindon Victor	Grenada	8.41	881	SB	4426
	2	Garrett Scantling	United States	DNS			

=== Pole vault ===
Pole vault was held on 19 March at 10:45.

Rank	Name	Nationality	4.40	4.50	4.60	4.70	4.80	4.90	5.00	5.10	5.20	5.30	5.40	Result	Points	Notes	Total
1	Hans-Christian Hausenberg	Estonia	–	–	–	–	o	–	o	o	xo	xo	xxx	5.30	1004	PB	5498
2	Ashley Moloney	Australia	–	–	o	–	o	o	o	o	xxx			5.10	941	PB	5504
3	Simon Ehammer	Switzerland	–	–	o	o	o	xo	xxo	xxo	xxx			5.10	941	PB	5634
4	Andri Oberholzer	Switzerland	–	–	–	o	xo	o	o	xxx				5.00	910		5265
5	Damian Warner	Canada	–	–	o	o	o	xxo	xxx					4.90	880	PB	5611
6	Dario Dester	Italy	–	–	o	–	xo	xxo	xxx					4.90	880		5094
7	Jorge Ureña	Spain	–	–	–	–	xxo	–	xxx					4.80	849		5201
8	Lindon Victor	Grenada	xxo	xo	o	o	xxx							4.70	819	SB	5245
9	Steven Bastien	United States	–	o	xo	xo	xxx							4.70	819		5177
10	Karel Tilga	Estonia	–	xo	xxx									4.50	760		5083
	Garrett Scantling	United States	did not start														

=== 1000 metres ===
The 1000 metres was held on 19 March at 19:40.

Rank	Name	Nationality	Result	Points	Notes	Total
1	Steven Bastien	United States	2:37.89	897	SB	6074
2	Karel Tilga	Estonia	2:39.28	881	SB	5964
3	Damian Warner	Canada	2:39.56	878	SB	6489
4	Jorge Ureña	Spain	2:42.28	848	SB	6049
5	Ashley Moloney	Australia	2:43.01	840	PB	6344
6	Dario Dester	Italy	2:43.49	835	SB	5929
7	Andri Oberholzer	Switzerland	2:43.61	834	PB	6099
8	Lindon Victor	Grenada	2:48.21	784	SB	6029
9	Simon Ehammer	Switzerland	2:53.54	729	SB	6363
10	Hans-Christian Hausenberg	Estonia	2:57.10	693	SB	6191

=== Final standings ===
After all events.

Rank	Name	Nationality	Result	Notes
1st place, gold medalist(s)	Damian Warner	Canada	6489	WL, NR
2nd place, silver medalist(s)	Simon Ehammer	Switzerland	6363	NR
3rd place, bronze medalist(s)	Ashley Moloney	Australia	6344	AR
4	Hans-Christian Hausenberg	Estonia	6191	PB
5	Andri Oberholzer	Switzerland	6099	PB
6	Steven Bastien	United States	6074	PB
7	Jorge Ureña	Spain	6049	SB
8	Lindon Victor	Grenada	6029	NR
9	Karel Tilga	Estonia	5964	SB
10	Dario Dester	Italy	5929	
	Garrett Scantling	United States	DNF	
	Kai Kazmirek	Germany	DNF	
