= Athletics at the 2020 Summer Olympics – Men's decathlon =

Men's decathlon at the Games of the XXXII Olympiad
- Olympic Athletics
- Venue: Japan National Stadium
- Dates: 4 August 2021; 5 August 2021
- Competitors: 23 from 15 nations
- Winning points: 9018 OR

Medalists
| 1st place, gold medalist(s) | | Damian Warner | Canada |
| 2nd place, silver medalist(s) | | Kevin Mayer | France |
| 3rd place, bronze medalist(s) | | Ashley Moloney | Australia |

The men's decathlon event at the 2020 Summer Olympics took place on 4 and 5 August 2021 at the Japan National Stadium. 23 athletes competed.

== Background ==
This was the 25th appearance of the event, having appeared in every Summer Olympics since 1912.

== Qualification ==
A National Olympic Committee (NOC) could enter up to 3 qualified athletes in the men's decathlon event if all athletes meet the entry standard or qualify by ranking during the qualifying period. (The limit of 3 has been in place since the 1930 Olympic Congress.) The qualifying standard is 8350 points. This standard was "set for the sole purpose of qualifying athletes with exceptional performances unable to qualify through the IAAF World Rankings pathway." The world rankings, based on the average of the best five results for the athlete over the qualifying period and weighted by the importance of the meet, will then be used to qualify athletes until the cap of 24 is reached.

The qualifying period was originally from 1 January 2019 to 29 June 2020. Due to the COVID-19 pandemic, the period was suspended from 6 April 2020 to 30 November 2020, with the end date extended to 29 June 2021. The qualifying time standards could be obtained in various meets during the given period that have the approval of the IAAF. Both outdoor and indoor meets are eligible. The most recent Area Championships may be counted in the ranking, even if not during the qualifying period.

NOCs cannot use their universality place in the decathlon.

=== Men's decathlon ===
Entry number: 24.

| Qualification standard | No. of athletes | NOC | Nominated athletes |
|---|---|---|---|
Entry standard – 8350
| Entry standard – 8350 | 3 | Estonia | Johannes Erm; Karel Tilga; Maicel Uibo |
| Entry standard – 8350 | 3 | United States | Steve Bastien; Garrett Scantling; Zach Ziemek |
| Entry standard – 8350 | 2 | Australia | Cedric Dubler; Ashley Moloney |
| Entry standard – 8350 | 2 | Canada | Pierce Lepage; Damian Warner |
| Entry standard – 8350 | 2 | Germany | Niklas Kaul; Kai Kazmirek |
| Entry standard – 8350 | 1 | ROC | Ilya Shkurenyov |
| Entry standard – 8350 | 1 | Belgium | Thomas Van der Plaetsen |
| Entry standard – 8350 | 1 | Brazil | Felipe dos Santos |
| Entry standard – 8350 | 1 | France | Kevin Mayer |
| Entry standard – 8350 | 1 | Grenada | Lindon Victor |
| World ranking | 2 | Czech Republic | Adam Sebastian Helcelet; Jiří Sýkora |
| World ranking | 1 | Belarus | Vital Zhuk |
| World ranking | 1 | Norway | Martin Roe |
| World ranking | 1 | Poland | Paweł Wiesiołek |
| World ranking | 1 | Spain | Jorge Ureña |
| Total | 23 | | |

== Competition format ==
The decathlon consisted of ten track and field events, with a points system that awarded higher scores for better results in each of the ten components. The athletes all competed in one competition with no elimination rounds.

== Records ==
Prior to this competition, the existing world, Olympic, and area records were as follows.

| World record | Kevin Mayer (FRA) | 9126 | Talence, France | 16 September 2018 |
| Olympic record | Roman Šebrle (CZE); Ashton Eaton (USA) | 8893 | Athens, Greece; Rio de Janeiro, Brazil | 24 August 2004; 18 August 2016 |

| Area | Points | Athlete | Nation |
|---|---|---|---|
| Africa (records) | 8521 | Larbi Bourrada | Algeria |
| Asia (records) | 8725 | Dmitriy Karpov | Kazakhstan |
| Europe (records) | 9126 WR | Kevin Mayer | France |
| North, Central America and Caribbean (records) | 9045 | Ashton Eaton | United States |
| Oceania (records) | 8492 | Ashley Moloney | Australia |
| South America (records) | 8393 | Carlos Eduardo Chinin | Brazil |

=== Records set during this event ===
| Olympic record | Damian Warner (CAN) | 9018 | Tokyo, Japan | 4–5 August 2021 |
| Olympic decathlon best – 100 metres (tied WDB) | Damian Warner (CAN) | 10.12 | Tokyo, Japan | 4 August 2021 |
| Olympic decathlon best – Long jump | Damian Warner (CAN) | 8.24 | Tokyo, Japan | 4 August 2021 |
| Olympic decathlon best – 110 metres hurdles | Damian Warner (CAN) | 13.46 | Tokyo, Japan | 5 August 2021 |
| Oceanic record | Ashley Moloney (AUS) | 8649 | Tokyo, Japan | 4–5 August 2021 |

== Schedule ==
All times are Japan Standard Time (UTC+9)

The men's decathlon took place over two consecutive days, with 5 events each day.

| Date | Time | Round |
|---|---|---|
| Wednesday, 4 August 2021 | 9:00 19:30 | 100 metres Long jump Shot put High jump 400 metres |
| Thursday, 5 August 2021 | 9:00 19:00 | 110 metres hurdles Discus throw Pole vault Javelin throw 1500 metres |

== Detailed results ==
| Key: | WDB | World decathlon best | ODB | Olympic decathlon best | NR | National record | PB | Personal best | SB | Seasonal best | DQ | Disqualified | DNS | Did not start | DNF | Did not finish |

=== 100 metres ===
| Rank | Heat | Athlete | Nation | Time | Points | Notes |
|---|---|---|---|---|---|---|
| 1 | 3 | Damian Warner | Canada | 10.12 | 1066 | =WDB |
| 2 | 3 | Ashley Moloney | Australia | 10.34 | 1013 | PB |
| 3 | 3 | Pierce Lepage | Canada | 10.43 | 992 | |
| 4 | 3 | Zach Ziemek | United States | 10.55 | 963 | PB |
| 5 | 3 | Felipe dos Santos | Brazil | 10.58 | 956 | |
| 6 | 2 | Jorge Ureña | Spain | 10.66 | 938 | PB |
| 7 | 3 | Garret Scantling | United States | 10.67 | 935 | |
| 7 | 1 | Lindon Victor | Grenada | 10.67 | 935 | SB |
| 9 | 1 | Kevin Mayer | France | 10.68 | 933 | SB |
| 10 | 3 | Steven Bastien | United States | 10.69 | 931 | |
| 11 | 3 | Paweł Wiesiołek | Poland | 10.83 | 899 | |
| 12 | 2 | Martin Roe | Norway | 10.86 | 892 | SB |
| 13 | 2 | Cedric Dubler | Australia | 10.89 | 885 | |
| 14 | 2 | Ilya Shkurenyov | ROC | 10.93 | 876 | SB |
| 15 | 1 | Johannes Erm | Estonia | 11.04 | 852 | SB |
| 15 | 2 | Vital Zhuk | Belarus | 11.04 | 852 | |
| 17 | 1 | Thomas Van der Plaetsen | Belgium | 11.05 | 850 | SB |
| 18 | 1 | Adam Helcelet | Czech Republic | 11.06 | 847 | SB |
| 19 | 2 | Kai Kazmirek | Germany | 11.09 | 841 | |
| 20 | 2 | Jiří Sýkora | Czech Republic | 11.18 | 821 | |
| 21 | 1 | Niklas Kaul | Germany | 11.22 | 812 | SB |
| 22 | 2 | Karel Tilga | Estonia | 11.31 | 793 | |
| 23 | 1 | Maicel Uibo | Estonia | 11.32 | 791 | SB |

=== Long jump ===
| Rank | Group | Athlete | Nation | #1 | #2 | #3 | Distance | Points | Notes | Overall points | Overall rank |
|---|---|---|---|---|---|---|---|---|---|---|---|
| 1 | B | Damian Warner | Canada | 8.24 | x | – | 8.24 | 1123 | ODB | 2189 | 1 |
| 2 | A | Pierce Lepage | Canada | 7.33 | 7.65 | – | 7.65 | 972 | SB | 1964 | 3 |
| 3 | B | Ashley Moloney | Australia | 7.64 | 7.40 | 7.60 | 7.64 | 970 | | 1983 | 2 |
| 4 | B | Ilya Shkurenyov | ROC | 7.59 | x | x | 7.59 | 957 | SB | 1833 | 7 |
| 5 | A | Kevin Mayer | France | x | 7.50 | 7.21 | 7.50 | 935 | SB | 1868 | 4 |
| 6 | A | Kai Kazmirek | Germany | 6.99 | 7.48 | 7.42 | 7.48 | 930 | SB | 1771 | 14 |
| 7 | B | Steven Bastien | United States | x | x | 7.39 | 7.39 | 908 | | 1839 | 6 |
| 8 | A | Felipe dos Santos | Brazil | 6.99 | 7.38 | 7.33 | 7.38 | 905 | SB | 1861 | 5 |
| 9 | A | Maicel Uibo | Estonia | 7.02 | 7.37 | 7.18 | 7.37 | 903 | SB | 1694 | 19 |
| 10 | B | Cedric Dubler | Australia | 7.27 | x | 7.36 | 7.36 | 900 | | 1785 | 12 |
| 10 | A | Niklas Kaul | Germany | 7.26 | 7.36 | 7.07 | 7.36 | 900 | PB | 1712 | 17 |
| 10 | A | Johannes Erm | Estonia | 7.25 | 7.13 | 7.36 | 7.36 | 900 | SB | 1752 | 15 |
| 13 | B | Jorge Ureña | Spain | 7.30 | 7.25 | x | 7.30 | 886 | | 1824 | 9 |
| 13 | B | Garret Scantling | United States | 7.07 | 7.30 | 7.10 | 7.30 | 886 | | 1821 | 10 |
| 15 | B | Paweł Wiesiołek | Poland | 7.27 | x | 7.27 | 7.27 | 878 | | 1777 | 13 |
| 16 | A | Lindon Victor | Grenada | x | 7.11 | 7.24 | 7.24 | 871 | | 1806 | 11 |
| 17 | B | Zach Ziemek | United States | 7.19 | 7.20 | 7.17 | 7.20 | 862 | | 1825 | 8 |
| 18 | A | Adam Helcelet | Czech Republic | 7.16 | 6.95 | 6.94 | 7.16 | 852 | | 1699 | 18 |
| 19 | A | Jiří Sýkora | Czech Republic | 6.92 | 7.03 | 6.94 | 7.03 | 821 | | 1642 | 21 |
| 19 | B | Martin Roe | Norway | x | x | 7.03 | 7.03 | 821 | | 1713 | 16 |
| 21 | A | Vital Zhuk | Belarus | 6.93 | x | x | 6.93 | 797 | | 1649 | 20 |
| 22 | B | Karel Tilga | Estonia | 6.77 | 6.51 | – | 6.77 | 760 | | 1553 | 22 |
| – | B | Thomas Van der Plaetsen | Belgium | x | – | – | NM | 0 | | 823 | 23 |

=== Shot put ===
| Rank | Group | Athlete | Nation | #1 | #2 | #3 | Distance | Points | Notes | Overall points | Overall rank |
|---|---|---|---|---|---|---|---|---|---|---|---|
| 1 | B | Vital Zhuk | Belarus | 16.23 | 15.97 | 15.34 | 16.23 | 865 | | 2514 | 15 |
| 2 | B | Garret Scantling | United States | 12.84 | 15.59 | x | 15.59 | 826 | | 2647 | 5 |
| 3 | B | Lindon Victor | Grenada | 14.61 | x | 15.39 | 15.39 | 814 | | 2620 | 6 |
| 4 | A | Pierce Lepage | Canada | x | 15.31 | x | 15.31 | 809 | PB | 2773 | 2 |
| 5 | B | Karel Tilga | Estonia | 14.26 | 15.25 | x | 15.25 | 805 | | 2358 | 22 |
| 6 | A | Kevin Mayer | France | 14.63 | 15.07 | x | 15.07 | 794 | SB | 2662 | 4 |
| 7 | B | Zach Ziemek | United States | 14.18 | 14.42 | 14.99 | 14.99 | 789 | PB | 2614 | 8 |
| 7 | B | Adam Helcelet | Czech Republic | 14.99 | x | x | 14.99 | 789 | | 2488 | 16 |
| 9 | A | Ilya Shkurenyov | ROC | 14.09 | 14.55 | 14.95 | 14.95 | 787 | PB | 2620 | 6 |
| 10 | B | Paweł Wiesiołek | Poland | 14.40 | 14.90 | x | 14.90 | 784 | SB | 2561 | 11 |
| 11 | A | Damian Warner | Canada | 14.33 | 14.29 | 14.80 | 14.80 | 777 | SB | 2966 | 1 |
| 12 | B | Jiří Sýkora | Czech Republic | 14.63 | x | x | 14.63 | 767 | | 2409 | 21 |
| 13 | A | Johannes Erm | Estonia | 14.07 | 14.01 | 14.60 | 14.60 | 765 | SB | 2517 | 14 |
| 14 | B | Niklas Kaul | Germany | 14.29 | 14.50 | 14.55 | 14.55 | 762 | SB | 2474 | 17 |
| 15 | B | Ashley Moloney | Australia | 14.04 | 14.49 | 14.24 | 14.49 | 758 | | 2741 | 3 |
| 16 | A | Kai Kazmirek | Germany | 13.93 | 14.44 | 14.46 | 14.46 | 757 | SB | 2528 | 13 |
| 17 | A | Steven Bastien | United States | x | 14.40 | x | 14.40 | 753 | | 2592 | 10 |
| 18 | A | Felipe dos Santos | Brazil | 13.29 | 13.36 | 14.13 | 14.13 | 736 | SB | 2597 | 9 |
| 19 | B | Martin Roe | Norway | x | x | 13.98 | 13.98 | 727 | | 2440 | 19 |
| 19 | A | Jorge Ureña | Spain | 13.97 | 13.34 | 13.31 | 13.97 | 727 | | 2551 | 12 |
| 21 | B | Maicel Uibo | Estonia | 13.95 | x | 13.66 | 13.95 | 725 | | 2419 | 20 |
| 22 | A | Cedric Dubler | Australia | 12.62 | 12.86 | 13.35 | 13.35 | 689 | PB | 2474 | 17 |
| – | A | Thomas Van der Plaetsen | Belgium | | | | DNS^{1} | | | | |

^{1} Van Der Plaetsen was forced to retire from the competition after pulling his achillies tendon during his second attempt in the long jump.

=== High jump ===
| Rank | Group | Athlete | Nation | Height | Points | Notes | Overall points | Overall rank |
|---|---|---|---|---|---|---|---|---|
| 1 | B | Ashley Moloney | Australia | 2.11 | 906 | =PB | 3647 | 2 |
| 1 | A | Niklas Kaul | Germany | 2.11 | 906 | PB | 3380 | 13 |
| 3 | B | Kevin Mayer | France | 2.08 | 878 | SB | 3540 | 4 |
| 4 | A | Cedric Dubler | Australia | 2.05 | 850 | | 3324 | 15 |
| 4 | A | Zach Ziemek | United States | 2.05 | 850 | | 3464 | 5 |
| 6 | A | Steven Bastien | United States | 2.05 | 850 | | 3442 | 6 |
| 7 | A | Jorge Ureña | Spain | 2.05 | 850 | SB | 3401 | 11 |
| 8 | A | Kai Kazmirek | Germany | 2.02 | 822 | | 3350 | 14 |
| 8 | A | Lindon Victor | Grenada | 2.02 | 822 | | 3442 | 7 |
| 8 | A | Damian Warner | Canada | 2.02 | 822 | | 3788 | 1 |
| 11 | B | Felipe dos Santos | Brazil | 2.02 | 822 | SB | 3419 | 9 |
| 12 | A | Maicel Uibo | Estonia | 2.02 | 822 | | 3241 | 19 |
| 13 | A | Karel Tilga | Estonia | 2.02 | 822 | | 3180 | 21 |
| 14 | B | Paweł Wiesiołek | Poland | 2.02 | 822 | SB | 3383 | 12 |
| 15 | A | Garret Scantling | United States | 1.99 | 794 | | 3441 | 8 |
| 16 | B | Pierce Lepage | Canada | 1.99 | 794 | | 3567 | 3 |
| 17 | B | Johannes Erm | Estonia | 1.99 | 794 | SB | 3311 | 16 |
| 18 | B | Ilya Shkurenyov | ROC | 1.99 | 794 | | 3414 | 10 |
| 19 | B | Vital Zhuk | Belarus | 1.96 | 767 | | 3281 | 17 |
| 19 | B | Adam Helcelet | Czech Republic | 1.96 | 767 | | 3255 | 18 |
| 21 | B | Martin Roe | Norway | 1.96 | 767 | =PB | 3207 | 20 |
| 22 | B | Jiří Sýkora | Czech Republic | 1.90 | 714 | | 3123 | 22 |

=== 400 metres ===
| Rank | Heat | Athlete | Nation | Time | Points | Notes | Overall points | Overall rank |
|---|---|---|---|---|---|---|---|---|
| 1 | 3 | Ashley Moloney | Australia | 46.29 | 994 | SB | 4641 | 2 |
| 2 | 3 | Pierce Lepage | Canada | 46.92 | 962 | PB | 4529 | 3 |
| 3 | 3 | Damian Warner | Canada | 47.48 | 934 | SB | 4722 | 1 |
| 4 | 3 | Steven Bastien | United States | 47.64 | 927 | SB | 4369 | 4 |
| 5 | 2 | Jorge Ureña | Spain | 48.00 | 909 | PB | 4310 | 8 |
| 6 | 3 | Kai Kazmirek | Germany | 48.17 | 901 | | 4251 | 13 |
| 7 | 3 | Paweł Wiesiołek | Poland | 48.24 | 898 | PB | 4281 | 10 |
| 8 | 1 | Johannes Erm | Estonia | 48.25 | 897 | SB | 4208 | 14 |
| 8 | 2 | Garret Scantling | United States | 48.25 | 897 | PB | 4338 | 6 |
| 10 | 2 | Jiří Sýkora | Czech Republic | 48.89 | 866 | SB | 3989 | 19 |
| 11 | 2 | Ilya Shkurenyov | ROC | 48.98 | 862 | SB | 4276 | 11 |
| 12 | 3 | Cedric Dubler | Australia | 49.02 | 860 | | 4184 | 15 |
| 13 | 1 | Zach Ziemek | United States | 49.06 | 858 | SB | 4322 | 7 |
| 14 | 2 | Lindon Victor | Grenada | 49.21 | 851 | SB | 4293 | 9 |
| 15 | 2 | Vital Zhuk | Belarus | 49.22 | 851 | SB | 4132 | 16 |
| 16 | 2 | Felipe dos Santos | Brazil | 49.31 | 847 | | 4266 | 12 |
| 17 | 1 | Adam Helcelet | Czech Republic | 49.41 | 842 | SB | 4097 | 17 |
| 18 | 1 | Kevin Mayer | France | 50.31 | 800 | SB | 4340 | 5 |
| 19 | 2 | Karel Tilga | Estonia | 50.48 | 793 | | 3973 | 21 |
| 20 | 1 | Maicel Uibo | Estonia | 50.82 | 777 | SB | 4018 | 18 |
| 21 | 1 | Martin Roe | Norway | 50.93 | 772 | | 3979 | 20 |
| – | 3 | Niklas Kaul | Germany | DNF | – | | 3380 | 22 |

=== 110 metres hurdles ===
| Rank | Heat | Athlete | Nation | Time | Points | Notes | Overall points | Overall rank |
|---|---|---|---|---|---|---|---|---|
| 1 | 3 | Damian Warner | Canada | 13.46 | 1045 | ODB | 5767 | 1 |
| 2 | 1 | Kevin Mayer | France | 13.90 | 987 | SB | 5327 | 4 |
| 3 | 3 | Garret Scantling | United States | 14.03 | 971 | | 5309 | 5 |
| 4 | 3 | Ashley Moloney | Australia | 14.08 | 964 | PB | 5605 | 2 |
| 5 | 3 | Jorge Ureña | Spain | 14.13 | 958 | | 5268 | 7 |
| 6 | 2 | Adam Helcelet | Czech Republic | 14.35 | 930 | | 5027 | 15 |
| 7 | 3 | Pierce Lepage | Canada | 14.39 | 925 | | 5454 | 3 |
| 8 | 3 | Steven Bastien | United States | 14.42 | 921 | | 5290 | 6 |
| 9 | 2 | Ilya Shkurenyov | ROC | 14.43 | 920 | | 5196 | 9 |
| 10 | 2 | Jiří Sýkora | Czech Republic | 14.48 | 913 | SB | 4902 | 18 |
| 11 | 1 | Zach Ziemek | United States | 14.51 | 910 | SB | 5232 | 8 |
| 12 | 1 | Johannes Erm | Estonia | 14.55 | 905 | SB | 5113 | 14 |
| 13 | 3 | Felipe dos Santos | Brazil | 14.58 | 901 | | 5167 | 10 |
| 14 | 2 | Kai Kazmirek | Germany | 14.73 | 882 | | 5133 | 13 |
| 15 | 1 | Lindon Victor | Grenada | 14.83 | 870 | SB | 5163 | 11 |
| 15 | 2 | Maicel Uibo | Estonia | 14.83 | 870 | | 4888 | 19 |
| 17 | 2 | Paweł Wiesiołek | Poland | 14.95 | 856 | | 5137 | 12 |
| 17 | 2 | Vital Zhuk | Belarus | 14.95 | 856 | | 4988 | 17 |
| 19 | 3 | Cedric Dubler | Australia | 15.10 | 837 | | 5021 | 16 |
| 20 | 1 | Martin Roe | Norway | 15.47 | 794 | | 4773 | 20 |
| 21 | 1 | Karel Tilga | Estonia | 16.10 | 722 | | 4695 | 21 |
| – | 2 | Niklas Kaul | Germany | DNS^{1} | | | | |

^{1} Kaul was forced to retire from the competition after pulling a muscle in the 400 meters.

=== Discus throw ===
| Rank | Group | Athlete | Nation | #1 | #2 | #3 | Distance | Points | Notes | Overall points | Overall rank |
|---|---|---|---|---|---|---|---|---|---|---|---|
| 1 | B | Jiří Sýkora | Czech Republic | 45.09 | 47.04 | 49.90 | 49.90 | 868 | | 5770 | 17 |
| 2 | B | Lindon Victor | Grenada | 49.75 | x | x | 49.75 | 865 | | 6028 | 6 |
| 3 | B | Damian Warner | Canada | 48.67 | 48.39 | 47.37 | 48.67 | 843 | | 6610 | 1 |
| 4 | B | Martin Roe | Norway | 44.86 | 48.37 | 45.69 | 48.37 | 836 | SB | 5609 | 20 |
| 5 | B | Paweł Wiesiołek | Poland | x | x | 48.27 | 48.27 | 834 | SB | 5971 | 10 |
| 6 | B | Kevin Mayer | France | 46.59 | 48.08 | x | 48.08 | 830 | | 6157 | 4 |
| 7 | B | Pierce Lepage | Canada | x | 47.14 | 45.63 | 47.14 | 811 | | 6265 | 3 |
| 8 | A | Ilya Shkurenyov | ROC | 45.81 | 45.87 | 47.02 | 47.02 | 809 | SB | 6005 | 8 |
| 9 | A | Vital Zhuk | Belarus | 44.11 | 43.81 | 47.01 | 47.01 | 808 | SB | 5796 | 16 |
| 10 | B | Maicel Uibo | Estonia | 46.38 | x | 44.93 | 46.38 | 795 | | 5683 | 19 |
| 11 | A | Johannes Erm | Estonia | 45.72 | 44.80 | 43.94 | 45.72 | 782 | SB | 5895 | 12 |
| 12 | B | Garret Scantling | United States | 43.57 | x | 45.46 | 45.46 | 776 | | 6085 | 5 |
| 13 | B | Adam Helcelet | Czech Republic | 41.33 | x | 45.40 | 45.40 | 775 | | 5802 | 15 |
| 14 | A | Zach Ziemek | United States | 44.36 | 44.87 | 44.84 | 44.87 | 764 | | 5996 | 9 |
| 15 | A | Ashley Moloney | Australia | 43.19 | 43.29 | 44.38 | 44.38 | 754 | | 6359 | 2 |
| 16 | A | Jorge Ureña | Spain | 41.95 | 43.70 | x | 43.70 | 740 | PB | 6008 | 7 |
| 17 | A | Cedric Dubler | Australia | 43.31 | x | 42.65 | 43.31 | 732 | | 5753 | 18 |
| 18 | A | Kai Kazmirek | Germany | 40.69 | 40.35 | 42.70 | 42.70 | 720 | | 5853 | 13 |
| 19 | B | Karel Tilga | Estonia | 41.31 | x | x | 41.31 | 691 | | 5386 | 21 |
| 20 | A | Steven Bastien | United States | x | x | 40.77 | 40.77 | 680 | | 5970 | 11 |
| 21 | A | Felipe dos Santos | Brazil | 37.89 | 39.91 | 36.62 | 39.91 | 663 | | 5830 | 14 |

=== Pole vault ===
| Rank | Group | Athlete | Nation | Height | Points | Notes | Overall points | Overall rank |
|---|---|---|---|---|---|---|---|---|
| 1 | B | Maicel Uibo | Estonia | 5.50 | 1067 | PB | 6750 | 12 |
| 2 | B | Zach Ziemek | United States | 5.30 | 1004 | | 7000 | 6 |
| 3 | B | Kevin Mayer | France | 5.20 | 972 | SB | 7129 | 4 |
| 4 | A | Vital Zhuk | Belarus | 5.10 | 941 | PB | 6737 | 14 |
| 5 | B | Garret Scantling | United States | 5.10 | 941 | | 7026 | 5 |
| 5 | B | Ilya Shkurenyov | ROC | 5.10 | 941 | SB | 6946 | 7 |
| 7 | B | Ashley Moloney | Australia | 5.00 | 910 | | 7269 | 2 |
| 8 | B | Pierce Lepage | Canada | 5.00 | 910 | | 7175 | 3 |
| 9 | A | Jorge Ureña | Spain | 4.90 | 880 | SB | 6888 | 9 |
| 10 | A | Lindon Victor | Grenada | 4.90 | 880 | | 6908 | 8 |
| 11 | A | Damian Warner | Canada | 4.90 | 880 | =PB | 7490 | 1 |
| 12 | B | Kai Kazmirek | Germany | 4.80 | 849 | | 6702 | 15 |
| 12 | B | Paweł Wiesiołek | Poland | 4.80 | 849 | | 6820 | 10 |
| 14 | A | Martin Roe | Norway | 4.80 | 849 | | 6458 | 19 |
| 15 | A | Johannes Erm | Estonia | 4.80 | 849 | SB | 6744 | 13 |
| 16 | B | Felipe dos Santos | Brazil | 4.60 | 790 | | 6620 | 16 |
| 17 | A | Steven Bastien | United States | 4.60 | 790 | | 6760 | 11 |
| 17 | A | Jiří Sýkora | Czech Republic | 4.60 | 790 | | 6560 | 18 |
| 19 | A | Adam Helcelet | Czech Republic | 4.60 | 790 | | 6592 | 17 |
| – | B | Cedric Dubler | Australia | NH | 0 | | 5763 | 20 |
| – | A | Karel Tilga | Estonia | NH | 0 | | 5386 | 21 |

=== Javelin throw ===
| Rank | Group | Athlete | Nation | #1 | #2 | #3 | Distance | Points | Notes | Overall points | Overall rank |
|---|---|---|---|---|---|---|---|---|---|---|---|
| 1 | A | Karel Tilga | Estonia | 71.71 | 72.58 | 73.36 | 73.36 | 941 | PB | 6327 | 21 |
| 2 | B | Kevin Mayer | France | 64.71 | 73.09 | – | 73.09 | 937 | PB | 8066 | 2 |
| 3 | B | Lindon Victor | Grenada | 65.06 | 68.46 | 71.56 | 71.56 | 913 | PB | 7821 | 6 |
| 4 | B | Garret Scantling | United States | 69.10 | x | 68.97 | 69.10 | 876 | SB | 7902 | 4 |
| 5 | A | Kai Kazmirek | Germany | 63.76 | 54.44 | – | 63.76 | 795 | SB | 7497 | 10 |
| 6 | A | Jiří Sýkora | Czech Republic | 63.73 | – | x | 63.73 | 794 | | 7354 | 15 |
| 7 | B | Damian Warner | Canada | 62.35 | 63.44 | 60.42 | 63.44 | 790 | SB | 8280 | 1 |
| 8 | A | Martin Roe | Norway | x | 56.96 | 62.28 | 62.28 | 772 | | 7230 | 19 |
| 9 | A | Adam Helcelet | Czech Republic | 59.61 | 60.85 | 61.54 | 61.54 | 761 | | 7353 | 16 |
| 10 | B | Ilya Shkurenyov | ROC | 60.38 | 60.95 | 59.82 | 60.95 | 752 | SB | 7698 | 8 |
| 11 | B | Zach Ziemek | United States | 60.14 | 58.96 | 60.44 | 60.44 | 744 | SB | 7744 | 7 |
| 12 | B | Vital Zhuk | Belarus | 57.32 | 56.70 | 59.49 | 59.49 | 730 | | 7467 | 12 |
| 13 | A | Cedric Dubler | Australia | 55.70 | 58.52 | 57.93 | 58.52 | 716 | SB | 6469 | 20 |
| 14 | B | Johannes Erm | Estonia | 56.35 | x | 58.41 | 58.41 | 714 | SB | 7458 | 13 |
| 15 | A | Steven Bastien | United States | 53.11 | 57.63 | 58.21 | 58.21 | 711 | | 7471 | 11 |
| 16 | A | Pierce Lepage | Canada | 57.14 | 53.45 | 57.24 | 57.24 | 696 | SB | 7871 | 5 |
| 17 | A | Ashley Moloney | Australia | 56.04 | 56.72 | 57.12 | 57.12 | 695 | SB | 7964 | 3 |
| 18 | B | Jorge Ureña | Spain | 55.82 | 54.24 | 53.12 | 55.82 | 675 | | 7563 | 9 |
| 19 | A | Felipe dos Santos | Brazil | 49.86 | 53.89 | 54.56 | 54.56 | 656 | | 7276 | 18 |
| 20 | A | Paweł Wiesiołek | Poland | 50.47 | x | 51.60 | 51.60 | 612 | | 7432 | 14 |
| 21 | B | Maicel Uibo | Estonia | 50.64 | – | – | 50.64 | 598 | | 7348 | 17 |

=== 1500 metres ===
| Rank | Athlete | Nation | Time | Points | Notes | Overall points | Overall rank |
|---|---|---|---|---|---|---|---|
| 1 | Steven Bastien | United States | 4:26.95 | 765 | | 8236 | 10 |
| 2 | Jorge Ureña | Spain | 4:27.82 | 759 | SB | 8322 | 9 |
| 3 | Johannes Erm | Estonia | 4:28.42 | 755 | PB | 8213 | 11 |
| 4 | Paweł Wiesiołek | Poland | 4:30.02 | 744 | | 8176 | 12 |
| 5 | Damian Warner | Canada | 4:31.08 | 738 | | 9018 | 1 |
| 6 | Pierce Lepage | Canada | 4:31.85 | 733 | PB | 8604 | 5 |
| 7 | Ilya Shkurenyov | ROC | 4:34.62 | 715 | | 8413 | 8 |
| 8 | Garret Scantling | United States | 4:35.54 | 709 | PB | 8611 | 4 |
| 9 | Karel Tilga | Estonia | 4:38.24 | 691 | | 7018 | 20 |
| 10 | Zach Ziemek | United States | 4:38.38 | 691 | PB | 8435 | 6 |
| 11 | Maicel Uibo | Estonia | 4:38.64 | 689 | | 8037 | 15 |
| 12 | Ashley Moloney | Australia | 4:39.19 | 685 | PB | 8649 | 3 |
| 13 | Vital Zhuk | Belarus | 4:42.57 | 664 | | 8131 | 13 |
| 14 | Kevin Mayer | France | 4:43.17 | 660 | SB | 8726 | 2 |
| 15 | Adam Helcelet | Czech Republic | 4:44.74 | 651 | SB | 8004 | 16 |
| 16 | Martin Roe | Norway | 4:47.58 | 633 | | 7863 | 19 |
| 17 | Kai Kazmirek | Germany | 4:48.30 | 629 | | 8126 | 14 |
| 18 | Felipe dos Santos | Brazil | 4:52.40 | 604 | | 7880 | 18 |
| 19 | Lindon Victor | Grenada | 4:54.32 | 593 | SB | 8414 | 7 |
| 20 | Jiří Sýkora | Czech Republic | 4:54.97 | 589 | | 7943 | 17 |
| 21 | Cedric Dubler | Australia | 5:03.69 | 539 | | 7008 | 21 |

== Overall results ==
Key

The highest mark recorded in each event is highlighted in yellow. These marks were split between eight competitors with the gold medallist claiming three of them.

| Key: | OR | Olympic record | AR | Area record | NR | National record | PB | Personal best | SB | Seasonal best | DNS | Did not start | DNF | Did not finish |

| Rank | Athlete | Nation | Overall points | 100 m | LJ | SP | HJ | 400 m | 110 m H | DT | PV | JT | 1500 m |
| 1st place, gold medalist(s) | Damian Warner | Canada | 9018 OR, NR | 1066 10.12 | 1123 8.24 | 777 14.80 | 822 2.02 | 934 47.48 | 1045 13.46 | 843 48.67 | 880 4.90 | 790 63.44 | 738 4:31.08 |
| 2nd place, silver medalist(s) | Kevin Mayer | France | 8726 SB | 933 10.68 | 935 7.50 | 794 15.07 | 878 2.08 | 800 50.31 | 987 13.90 | 830 48.08 | 972 5.20 | 937 73.09 | 660 4:43.17 |
| 3rd place, bronze medalist(s) | Ashley Moloney | Australia | 8649 AR | 1013 10.34 | 970 7.64 | 758 14.49 | 906 2.11 | 994 46.29 | 964 14.08 | 754 44.38 | 910 5.00 | 695 57.12 | 685 4:39.19 |
| 4 | Garret Scantling | United States | 8611 | 935 10.67 | 886 7.30 | 826 15.59 | 794 1.99 | 897 48.25 | 971 14.03 | 776 45.46 | 941 5.10 | 876 69.10 | 709 4:35.54 |
| 5 | Pierce Lepage | Canada | 8604 PB | 992 10.43 | 972 7.65 | 809 15.31 | 794 1.99 | 962 46.92 | 925 14.39 | 811 47.14 | 910 5.00 | 696 57.24 | 733 4:31.85 |
| 6 | Zach Ziemek | United States | 8435 | 963 10.55 | 862 7.20 | 789 14.99 | 850 2.05 | 858 49.06 | 910 14.51 | 764 44.87 | 1004 5.30 | 744 60.44 | 691 4:38.38 |
| 7 | Lindon Victor | Grenada | 8414 SB | 935 10.67 | 871 7.24 | 814 15.39 | 822 2.02 | 851 49.21 | 870 14.83 | 865 49.75 | 880 4.90 | 913 71.56 | 593 4:54.32 |
| 8 | Ilya Shkurenyov | ROC | 8413 SB | 876 10.93 | 957 7.59 | 787 14.95 | 794 1.99 | 862 48.98 | 920 14.43 | 809 47.02 | 941 5.10 | 752 60.95 | 715 4:34.62 |
| 9 | Jorge Ureña | Spain | 8322 PB | 938 10.66 | 886 7.30 | 727 13.97 | 850 2.05 | 909 48.00 | 958 14.13 | 740 43.70 | 880 4.90 | 675 55.82 | 759 4:27.82 |
| 10 | Steven Bastien | United States | 8236 | 931 10.69 | 908 7.39 | 753 14.40 | 850 2.05 | 927 47.64 | 921 14.42 | 680 40.77 | 790 4.60 | 711 58.21 | 764 4:26.95 |
| 11 | Johannes Erm | Estonia | 8213 SB | 852 11.04 | 900 7.36 | 765 14.60 | 794 1.99 | 897 48.25 | 905 14.55 | 782 45.72 | 849 4.80 | 714 58.41 | 755 4:28.42 |
| 12 | Paweł Wiesiołek | Poland | 8176 | 899 10.83 | 878 7.27 | 784 14.90 | 822 2.02 | 898 48.24 | 856 14.95 | 834 48.27 | 849 4.80 | 612 51.60 | 744 4:30.02 |
| 13 | Vitaliy Zhuk | Belarus | 8131 | 852 11.04 | 797 6.93 | 865 16.23 | 767 1.96 | 851 49.22 | 856 14.95 | 808 47.01 | 941 5.10 | 730 59.49 | 664 4:42.57 |
| 14 | Kai Kazmirek | Germany | 8126 | 841 11.09 | 930 7.48 | 757 14.46 | 822 2.02 | 901 48.17 | 882 14.73 | 720 42.70 | 849 4.80 | 795 63.76 | 629 4:48.30 |
| 15 | Maicel Uibo | Estonia | 8037 | 791 11.32 | 903 7.37 | 725 13.95 | 822 2.02 | 777 50.82 | 870 14.83 | 795 46.38 | 1067 5.50 | 598 50.64 | 689 4:38.64 |
| 16 | Adam Helcelet | Czech Republic | 8004 | 847 11.06 | 852 7.16 | 789 14.99 | 767 1.96 | 842 49.41 | 930 14.35 | 775 45.40 | 790 4.60 | 761 61.54 | 651 4:44.74 |
| 17 | Jiří Sýkora | Czech Republic | 7943 | 821 11.18 | 821 7.03 | 767 14.63 | 714 1.90 | 866 48.89 | 913 14.48 | 868 49.90 | 790 4.60 | 794 63.73 | 589 4:54.97 |
| 18 | Felipe dos Santos | Brazil | 7880 | 956 10.58 | 905 7.38 | 736 14.13 | 822 2.02 | 847 49.31 | 901 14.58 | 663 39.91 | 790 4.60 | 656 54.56 | 604 4:52.40 |
| 19 | Martin Roe | Norway | 7863 | 892 10.86 | 821 7.03 | 727 13.98 | 767 1.96 | 772 50.93 | 794 15.47 | 836 48.37 | 849 4.80 | 772 62.28 | 633 4:47.58 |
| 20 | Karel Tilga | Estonia | 7018 | 793 11.31 | 760 6.77 | 805 15.25 | 822 2.02 | 793 50.48 | 722 16.10 | 691 41.31 | 0 NM | 941 73.36 | 691 4:38.24 |
| 21 | Cedric Dubler | Australia | 7008 | 885 10.89 | 900 7.36 | 689 13.35 | 850 2.05 | 860 49.02 | 837 15.10 | 732 43.31 | 0 NM | 716 58.52 | 539 5:03.69 |
| n/a | Niklas Kaul | Germany | DNF | 812 11.22 | 900 7.36 | 762 14.55 | 906 2.11 | DNF | DNS | DNS | DNS | DNS | DNS |
| n/a | Thomas Van der Plaetsen | Belgium | DNF | 850 11.05 | 0 NM | DNS | DNS | DNS | DNS | DNS | DNS | DNS | DNS |
