= Damian Warner =

Canadian decathlete (born 1989)

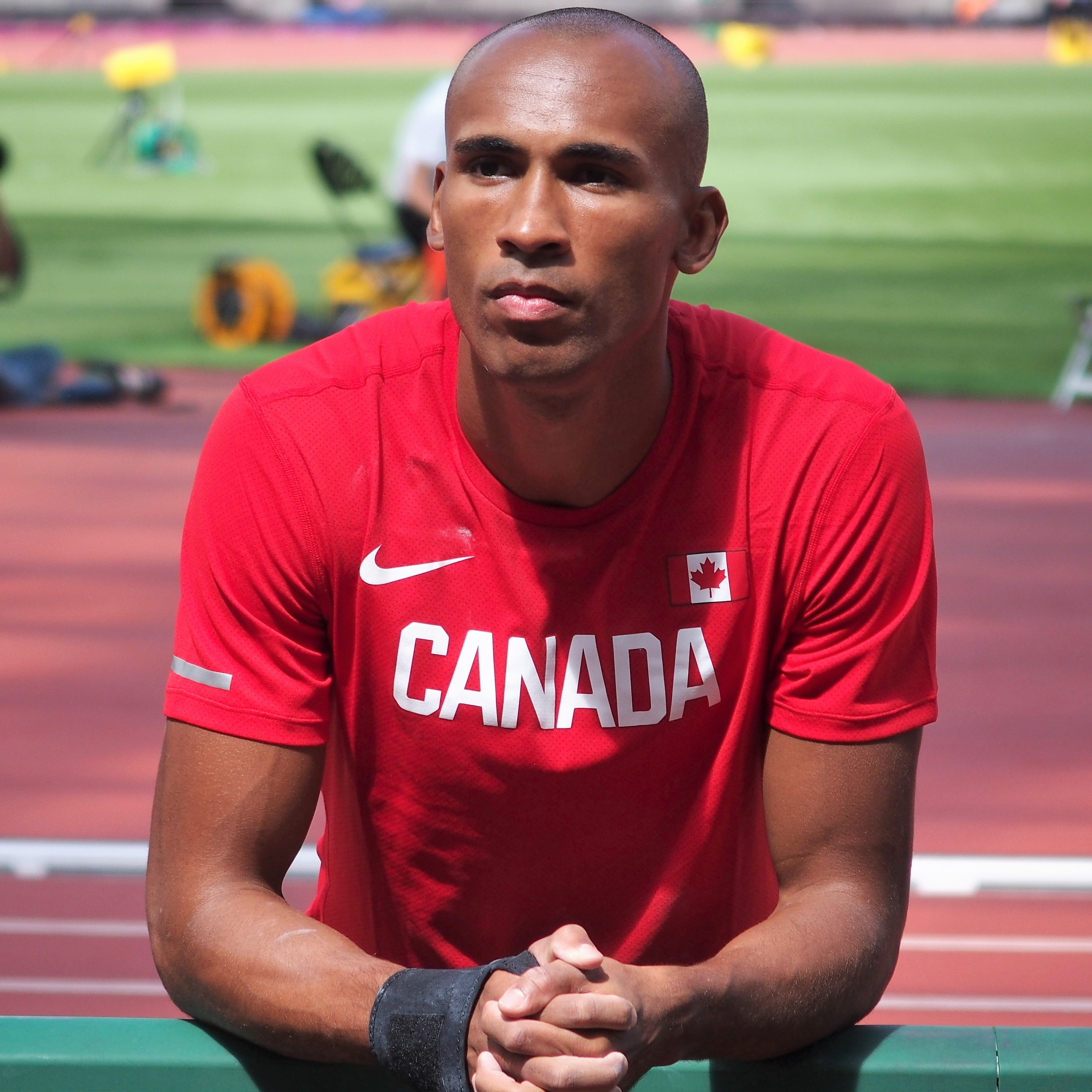
- Warner at the 2017 World Championships in Athletics

Personal information
- Full name: Damian David George Warner
- Born: November 4, 1989 (age 37) London, Ontario, Canada
- Height: 1.84 m (6 ft 0 in)
- Weight: 83 kg (183 lb)

Sport
- Country: Canada
- Sport: Track and field
- Event: Decathlon

Achievements and titles
- Personal bests: Decathlon: 9,018 NR (2021); Hepthalon: 6,489 NR (2022)
Medal record
Men's athletics
Representing Canada
Olympic Games
Gold medal – first place	2020 Tokyo	Decathlon
Bronze medal – third place	2016 Rio de Janeiro	Decathlon
World Championships
Silver medal – second place	2015 Beijing	Decathlon
Silver medal – second place	2023 Budapest	Decathlon
Bronze medal – third place	2013 Moscow	Decathlon
Bronze medal – third place	2019 Doha	Decathlon
World Indoor Championships
Gold medal – first place	2022 Belgrade	Heptathlon
Silver medal – second place	2018 Birmingham	Heptathlon
Commonwealth Games
Gold medal – first place	2014 Glasgow	Decathlon
Silver medal – second place	2026 Glasgow	Decathlon
Pan American Games
Gold medal – first place	2015 Toronto	Decathlon
Gold medal – first place	2019 Lima	Decathlon
- Updated on August 4, 2024

Damian David George Warner (born November 4, 1989) is a Canadian track and field athlete specializing in decathlon. He is the 2020 Olympic champion and a four-time world medallist (silver in 2015 and 2023, bronze in 2013 and 2019). Warner also won the bronze medal at the 2016 Summer Olympics and was the 2014 Commonwealth champion and a two-time Pan American champion from the 2015 and 2019 Games. Competing in the heptathlon, he is the 2022 World Indoor champion.

Warner holds the Olympic Games, Pan Am Games and the Canadian national records for the decathlon and the fourth-highest decathlon score in history (9018 points). Notable for his sprinting, Warner holds decathlon bests in the 100 m and 110 m hurdles, running a 10.12 and 13.27, respectively. He formerly held the decathlon best in the long jump (8.28 m) as well.

== Early life and career ==
Warner was born on November 4, 1989, in London, Ontario to Kevin Warner and Brenda Philpott. Warner's natural talent saw him move effortlessly into the athletics scene and by the age of 20, he had won silver in the decathlon at the 2010 Canadian championships with a final score of 7449. He continued to improve over the next two years, winning the decathlon in the next two national championships. His winning performance of 8107 in the 2012 championships was below the Olympic A qualifying standard of 8200, but in combination with his perceived future potential, he was selected to represent Canada at the 2012 Summer Olympics. Warner placed fifth at the 2012 Summer Olympics in London, with a point total of 8442, a jump of 335 points over his previous best score.

== International career ==
2013 World Championship bronze and 2014 Commonwealth Games title
In his first outing of 2013, Warner won at the high-profile Hypo Meeting with a score of 8307 points, including bests of 2.09 m in the high jump and 62.84 m in the javelin throw. Following this, Warner went into the 2013 World Championships in Athletics; after the first day, he was in fifth place, but on the second day, he tied a personal best in the pole vault and threw a personal best in the javelin to fight his way into the bronze medal position. After achieving his medal he said "This is such a great feeling, all the hard work my coaches and I put into this the last couple of years. In 2011 I finished 18th and saw the three medallists running around the track with their country's flags draped over their shoulders; I told my coaches that I want that to be me, pretty special feeling to achieve that." Warner's final score of 8,512 was a new personal best and was the first time a Canadian reached the podium in the decathlon at the World Championships since Mike Smith in 1995. He ended his 2013 season with a win at the Decastar meeting with a tally of 8161 points.

The 2014 Commonwealth Games took place in Glasgow, Scotland. There Warner participated in the decathlon, winning the event with a score of 8,282. This was Warner's first decathlon of the year as he was sidelined much of the year with an ankle injury. Despite this, he ran to a 10.29 in the 100 m, a games record for the decathlon, while also setting a PB in the 400 at 47.68. He finished the second day with a games record in the 110 m hurdles in a time of 13.50.

2015 Pan Am Games champion and World Championship silver
In 2015 Warner competed for the first time at the Hypo-Meeting in Götzis, but all three of his shot put attempts and did not finish the event. The next major event for him was the 2015 Pan American Games on home soil in Toronto. Warner came into the event as the favourite and broke the national and Pan Am Games records with a score of 8,626. This beat Smith's record, which had stood since 1996.

One month later, at the 2015 World Championships in Athletics, Warner set a new national record of 8695 points and won a silver medal, behind Ashton Eaton's new world record.

2016 Olympic bronze

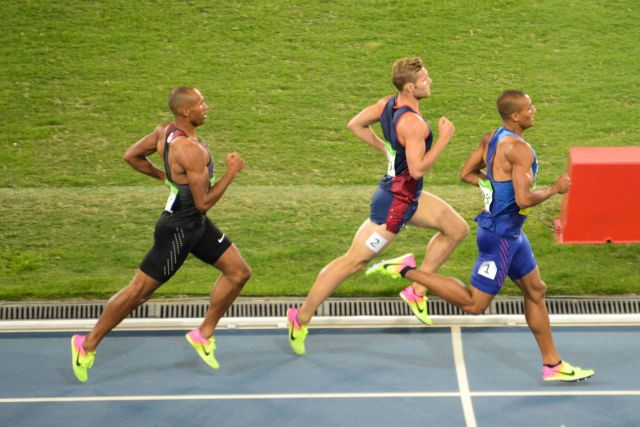
Warner (left) running in the 1,500 m at the 2016 Summer Olympics.

At the 2016 Olympics decathlon in Rio de Janeiro, Warner was initially in second place behind Ashton Eaton, but following a surge by France's Kevin Mayer and mediocre performances in the shot put and high jump he dropped to third place by the end of the first day. On the second day, he regained second place, following a first-place finish in the 110-metre hurdles, but dropped behind Mayer again. Following the pole vault, he threatened to fall behind Kai Kazmirek but ultimately protected his third-place position with the javelin throw. He finished in third place behind Eaton and Mayer, earning the bronze medal and becoming the second Canadian to medal in the decathlon, following Dave Steen at the 1988 Olympics in Seoul.

2017 World Championships and 2018 Commonwealth Games
Warner competed at the 2017 IAAF World Championships. Unfortunately, he had to be quarantined after coming down with the norovirus that affected many athletes in London that year. Warner struggled on the first day of competition and had to settle for fifth overall.

He was named to the Canadian team for the 2018 Commonwealth Games, where he was widely considered the frontrunner to defend his 2014 title. Warner performed strongly on the first day of the decathlon, and midway through the second day, with seven events completed, was leading. However, disaster struck during the pole vault when Warner failed to clear any height, immediately dropping from first place to sixth. With no chance of winning a medal, Warner opted to withdraw from the contest.

Following his disappointment in Australia, Warner won his fourth (and third consecutive) Hypo-Meeting, setting a new Canadian record in the process.

2019 World bronze, Pan Am gold
In May 2019, Warner won his fifth Hypo-Meeting, becoming one of only three athletes to win the event five times. In the process, he broke his own record for the decathlon best in the 100m sprint with a time of 10.12 seconds and set a new personal best in the shot put.

Warner competed in the 2019 Pan American Games in Lima, aiming to defend his 2015 title. Despite lingering ankle pain, he successfully repeated as the decathlon champion, finishing 273 points ahead of silver medalist Lindon Victor of Grenada. Fellow Canadian decathlete Pierce LePage joined him on the podium as bronze medalist.

Warner concluded the season with the decathlon the 2019 World Championships in Doha. Midway through the event, defending champion Kevin Mayer of France withdrew due to injury, briefly making Warner the perceived favourite for the gold medal. However, Warner performed below his normal standard in some events and was in second place heading into the final segment of the competition, the 1500m race. He finished ninth in that segment, below his personal best time, and dropped to third place overall behind a surging Niklas Kaul of Germany and Estonia's Maicel Uibo. This was his third World championship medal. However, with the COVID-19 pandemic forcing the cancellation of the 2020 international athletic season and the delaying of the Tokyo Olympics, it would prove to be his final competition for almost two years.

2021 Olympic gold
The pandemic brought additional challenges for Warner, as the training facilities at the University of Western Ontario were closed, and he was unable to travel to the United States to train. Instead, he and his coaches transformed the unheated interior of London, Ontario's 66-year-old Farquharson Arena into a decathlete training facility. However, he later credited the time away from competition as affording the opportunity to heal persistent ankle injuries.

Warner returned to competition at the 2021 Hypo-Meeting, where he became the first man to win six event titles. He set his third decathlon best, this time in the long jump, at 8.28m, and a new personal and national record in overall points, with 8,995 points. He was only five points short of becoming the fourth decathlete in history to score 9000 points.

The decathlon event at the 2020 Summer Olympics was widely considered at the outset to be a contest for gold between Warner and French rival Kevin Mayer. On day one, Warner opened the event by repeating his world decathlon best time of 10.12 in the 100 m sprint, setting an Olympic Games record in the process. In the long jump, he recorded a distance of 8.24 metres, another Olympic record and just 0.04 shy of the world decathlon best he had set earlier at the Hypo-Meeting. His distance would have earned him a bronze medal in the long jump. He then set a season-best in the shot put, reaching 14.80 metres in his third throw. In the high jump, he cleared 2.02 m but conceded ground to Mayer, who successfully cleared 2.08 m. Warner closed out the day in the 400 m, recording a season-best time of 47.48, finishing third behind Australian Ashley Moloney and compatriot Pierce LePage. Halfway through, Warner was in first place with 4722 points, 81 points ahead of Moloney.

Day two of the Olympic decathlon began with Warner running the 110 m hurdles in 13.46, one-tenth of a second slower than his season-best but an Olympic record, his third of the competition. He then recorded a 48.67 m opening discus throw, which would end up being the third-best in the field, ahead of Mayer. In the pole vault, traditionally his weakest event, Warner equalled his previous personal best of 4.90 m. Mayer cleared 5.20 m in the same segment where he was expected to make up significant ground, and as a result, Warner maintained a lead of 361 points on his main rival at the end of eight of the ten events. Resuming competition in the afternoon, Warner's best javelin throw covered 63.44 m, close to his personal best. Mayer threw a new personal best distance of 73.09, gaining 147 points on Warner, but this still left Warner ahead by 214 points going into the closing 1500 m race. Warner came fifth in that segment, taking the gold medal and, in the process, becoming the fourth decathlete to score over 9000 points with a score of 9018. This was also a new Olympic record. He was the second Canadian man to win a medal at the Tokyo Olympics, after Andre De Grasse.

As a result of his achievement, Warner was named as Canada's flagbearer for the Olympics closing ceremonies. Warner subsequently stated that he hoped to compete at the 2024 Summer Olympics in Paris to defend his title. At the end of the year, Warner was recognized with both the Lionel Conacher Award from the Canadian Press as the country's top male athlete and the Lou Marsh Trophy for Canada's top athlete.

2022 World heptathlon gold
Warner was scheduled to begin his season in March at the heptathlon event at the 2022 World Athletics Indoor Championships in Belgrade, but told his coaches in mid-February that he felt "terrible" and unprepared for competition. After extensive work with his coach, physiotherapist, and sports psychologist, he said, "there's still a little bit of that funk in me, but I'm headed in the right direction with the steps we've taken this year from a technical standpoint and training-wise." His main rival, Mayer, was absent due to health complications from contracting COVID-19. Competing at the Indoor Championships, Warner set new personal bests in the 60 m sprint, the 60 m hurdles, and the long jump, the last of those also a new national record, and took the gold medal with a national record score.

Attending the 2022 Hypo-Meeting, Warner was narrowly in second place after the first day of competition, two points behind Swiss decathlete Simon Ehammer, who broke Warner's decathlon best long jump performance at the previous year's meeting. On the second day he took the points lead in the hurdles event, and then maintained it through the remainder, winning his seventh (and sixth consecutive) event title.

Warner opted to withdraw from the Canadian track and field championships, citing the need to manage a chronically sore knee in advance of the 2022 World Athletics Championships. Beginning his quest for the World title at Hayward Field in Eugene, Oregon, Warner finished first in both the 100 m and the long jump on opening day, before posting season's best distances in both the high jump and the shot put. He equaled principal rival Kevin Mayer in the high jump and narrowly beat him in the shot put, traditionally one of Mayer's areas of strength. As a result, he enjoyed a clear lead going into the final event of the first day, the 400 m, but suffered an apparent hamstring injury on the track and was forced to withdraw, ending his competition. Warner said he was "just going to go back and hope this heals and do what every other athlete does and get stronger, and hopefully get myself back on top of the world once again."

It was subsequently determined that Warner had suffered a hamstring strain rather than a more serious tear and was projected to take between six and eight weeks away from training. His coach, Gar Leyshon, speculated that he had a pattern of becoming injured in seasons where he had earlier competed at the World Indoor Championships.

2023 World silver
Warner sustained a hip injury in April after a fall in a hurdling event in Louisiana. A subsequent flareup of this hip pain during the 2023 Hypo-Meeting hampered his performance, and he finished second in the event behind LePage, who he praised, saying "the better man won today." Warner said he would take a break from training to allow his hip to recover.

Competing at the 2023 World Athletics Championships, Warner began the first day of competition by finishing first in the 100 m, before coming third in the long jump and recording season's best results in both the shot put and the high jump. He was sixth in the 400 m, where he had bowed out of the competition the prior year, saying afterward that there were "no flashbacks." He ended the day in third place, behind LePage and German Leo Neugebauer. On the second day, Warner once again won the hurdles and overtook Neugebauer for second place. Over the course of the remaining events he fell back of LePage, and subsequent to the javelin throw was again third, this time behind Lindon Victor of Grenada, but overtook Victor in the 1500 m final and won his fourth World medal, a second silver, while LePage won the gold medal, a first for Canada in the decathlon. Warner commented on his younger teammate's success that "Pierce was really awesome and I'm very happy for him, but I'm very proud of myself, too. I wanted to get the gold, but it makes it a little bit better to have another Canadian winning it."

2024 Paris Olympics
As a preliminary to the Olympics, Warner competed at the 2024 Hypo-Meeting in Götzis. Trailing Swiss decathlete Simon Ehammer after the first day, he overtook him in the discus throw and remained in first place for the remaining events, winning his eighth event title.

It had been anticipated that Warner and the younger LePage would both be title contenders at the 2024 Summer Olympics in Paris, but LePage had to withdraw due to a disc herniation. As well, Warner's longtime rival Kevin Mayer suffered a thigh injury suffered in a Diamond League race and was ruled unable to compete as a result. The oldest decathlete in the field at age 34, Warner and his coaches modified his training regimen to reflect this. Warner fared well in the first seven events of the Olympic decathlon, and was in second place, 72 points behind Germany's Leo Neugebauer. He received no points in the pole vault after failing to clear his opening height of 4.60 metres in three attempts, effectively ruling him out of medal contention. Warner chose not to compete in the final two events of the competition.

== Championship results ==
Year	Competition	Venue	Position	Event	Result
Representing Canada
2011	NACAC Combined Events Championships	Kingston	2nd	Decathlon	7760 points
2011	World Championships	Daegu	18th	Decathlon	7832 points
2012	Olympic Games	London	5th	Decathlon	8442 points
2013	World Championships	Moscow	3rd	Decathlon	8512 points
2014	World Indoor Championships	Sopot	7th	Heptathlon	6129 points
2014	Pan American Combined Events Cup	Ottawa	—	Decathlon	DNF
2014	Commonwealth Games	Glasgow	1st	Decathlon	8282 points
2015	Pan American Games	Toronto	1st	Decathlon	8659 points
2015	World Championships	Beijing	2nd	Decathlon	8695 points
2016	Olympic Games	Rio	3rd	Decathlon	8666 points
2017	World Championships	London	5th	Decathlon	8309 points
2018	World Indoor Championships	Birmingham	2nd	Heptathlon	6343 pts
2018	Commonwealth Games	Gold Coast	—	Decathlon	DNF
2019	Pan American Games	Lima	1st	Decathlon	8513 points
2019	World Championships	Doha	3rd	Decathlon	8529 points
2021	Olympic Games	Tokyo	1st	Decathlon	9018 points
2022	World Indoor Championships	Belgrade	1st	Heptathlon	6489 points
2022	World Championships	Eugene	—	Decathlon	DNF
2023	World Championships	Budapest	2nd	Decathlon	8804 points
2024	Olympic Games	Paris	—	Decathlon	DNF
2026	Commonwealth Games	Glasgow	2nd	Decathlon	8036 points

== Personal bests ==
Outdoor

Individual events
Event	Performance	Location	Date
100 meters	10.42 (+1.3 m/s)	London, Ontario	May 17, 2015
100 meters	10.09 (+5.3 m/s)	London, Ontario	May 14, 2016
200 meters	20.97 (+0.9 m/s)	Baton Rouge	April 23, 2022
200 meters	20.63 (+2.9 m/s)	Azusa	April 14, 2017
400 meters	46.54	Athens, Georgia	April 30, 2016
110 meters hurdles	13.27 (+1.9 m/s)	Edmonton	July 4, 2015
Long jump	7.72 m (25 ft 3 3/4 in) (−0.2 m/s)	Ottawa	July 6, 2018
Pole vault	4.90 m (16 ft 3/4 in)	Bolton	July 16, 2016
Shot put	14.74 m (48 ft 4 1/4 in)	London, Ontario	April 24, 2016
Discus throw	50.26 m (164 ft 10 1/2 in)	Santa Barbara	March 19, 2016

Combined events
Event	Performance	Location	Date	Points
Decathlon	—N/a	Tokyo	August 4–5, 2021	9,018 points
100 meters	10.12 (+0.9 m/s)^{[a]}	Götzis	May 25, 2019	1,066 points
Long jump	8.28 m (27 ft 1 3/4 in) (+1.2 m/s m/s)^{[b]}	Götzis	May 29, 2021	1,133 points
Shot put	15.34 m (50 ft 3 3/4 in)	Götzis	May 25, 2019	811 points
High jump	2.09 m (6 ft 10 1/4 in)	Götzis	May 25, 2013	887 points
400 meters	47.34	Paris	August 2, 2024	941 points
110 meters hurdles	13.36 (+0.9 m/s)^{[a]}	Götzis	May 30, 2021	1,059 points
Discus throw	49.35 m (161 ft 10 3/4 in)	Azusa	April 11, 2025	857 points
Pole vault	4.90 m (16 ft 3/4 in)	Tokyo	August 5, 2021	880 points
Javelin throw	64.67 m (212 ft 2 in)	Moscow	August 11, 2013	808 points
1500 meters	4:24.73	Toronto	July 23, 2015	780 points
Virtual Best Performance				9,222 points

^{a} Decathlon best
^{b} Former decathlon best

Indoor

Individual events
Event	Performance	Location	Date
60 meters	6.84	Toronto	February 19, 2011
200 meters	21.18	University Center	January 22, 2016
300 meters	34.65	London, Ontario	January 18, 2014
400 meters	47.36	Geneva, Ohio	February 14, 2015
60 meters hurdles	7.62	Baton Rouge	February 21, 2020
Long jump	7.62 m (25 ft 0 in)	Montreal	February 21, 2015
High jump	1.87 m (6 ft 1 1/2 in)	Toronto	February 20, 2011
Pole vault	4.80 m (15 ft 8 3/4 in)	Toronto	January 30, 2016
Shot put	15.59 m (51 ft 1 3/4 in)	Baton Rouge	February 21, 2020

Combined events
Event	Performance	Location	Date	Points
Heptathlon	—N/a	Belgrade	March 18–19, 2022	6,489 points
60 meters	6.68	Belgrade	March 18, 2022	999 points
Long jump	8.05 m (26 ft 4 3/4 in)	Belgrade	March 18, 2022	1,073 points
Shot put	14.89 m (48 ft 10 in)	Belgrade	March 18, 2022	783 points
High jump	2.00 m (6 ft 6 1/2 in)	Sopot	March 7, 2014	803 points
60 meters hurdles	7.61	Belgrade	March 19, 2022	1,082 points
Pole vault	4.90 m (16 ft 3/4 in)	Birmingham	March 3, 2018	880 points
1000 meters	2:37.12	Birmingham	March 3, 2018	906 points
Virtual Best Performance				6,526 points

== Personal life ==
Warner and partner Jennifer Cotten, a former elite hurdler, became the parents of a son, Theo, in March 2021.
