= Zach Ziemek =

American decathlete (born 1993)

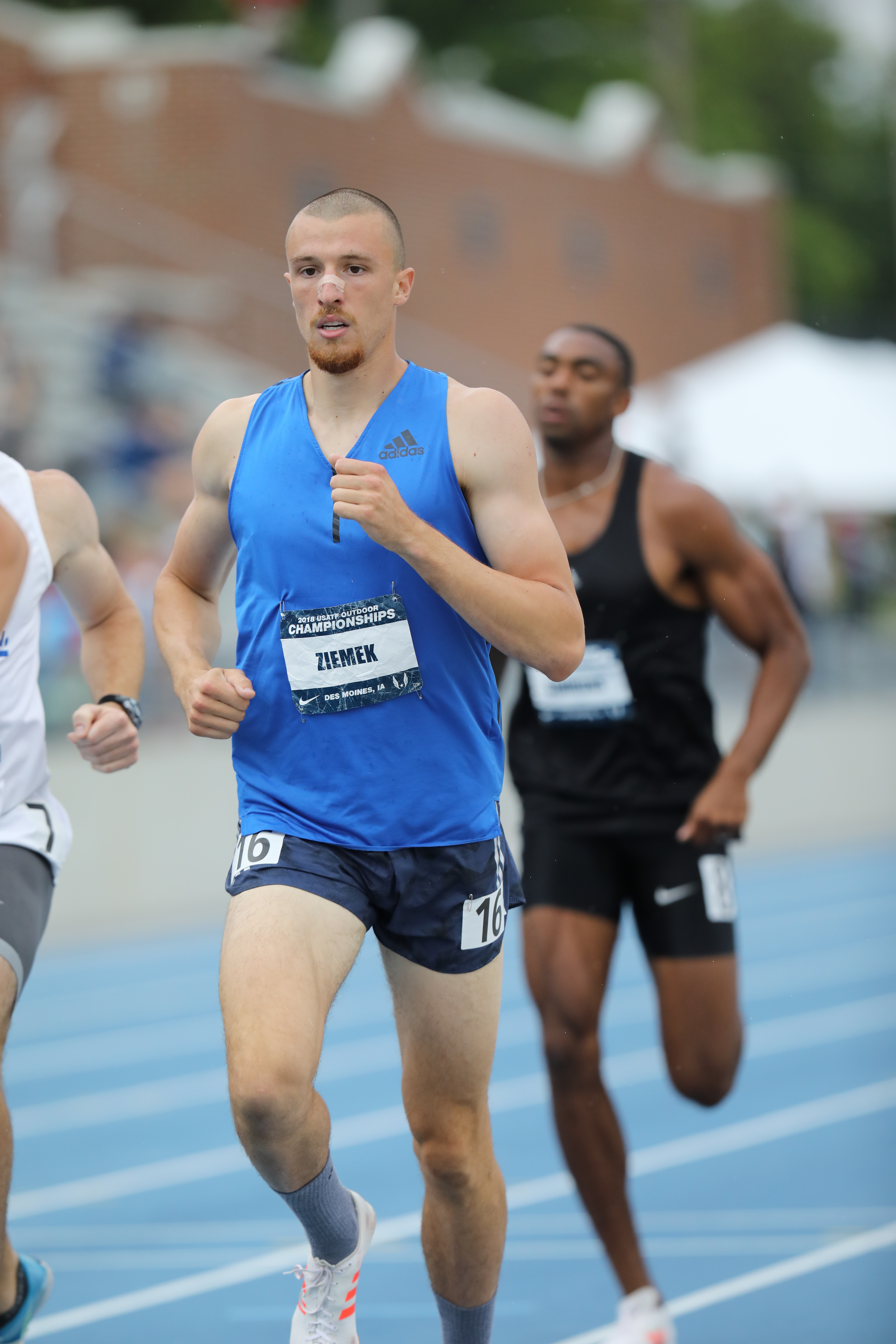
- Ziemek at the 2018 USA Outdoor Track and Field Championships

Personal information
- Full name: Zachery Ziemek
- Born: February 23, 1993 (age 33) Elmhurst, Illinois, U.S.
- Home town: Itasca, Illinois, U.S.
- Education: University of Wisconsin–Madison
- Height: 6 ft 3 in (191 cm)

Sport
- Sport: Track and field
- Event: Decathlon
Medal record
Men's athletics
Representing the United States
World Championships
Bronze medal – third place	2022 Eugene	Decathlon

Zachery (Zach) Ziemek (born February 23, 1993) is an American athlete competing in the decathlon. Ziemek is one of only two American men to compete in 3 decathlon competitions at the Olympic Games and the only American in history to finish 3 Olympic Decathlons (2016, 2020, 2024). Ziemek won the bronze medal at the 2022 World Championships in Eugene with a personal best score of 8676. In 2021 he finished 6th at the Tokyo Olympics. He represented his country at the 2015 World Championships in Beijing, where he finished 15th. Ziemek finished 7th in the decathlon at the 2016 Olympics.

== Career ==
At the 2020 United States Olympic Trials (track and field) Ziemek came third behind Garrett Scantling and Steve Bastien (athlete) with an Olympic qualifying score to earn a spot at the delayed 2020 Tokyo Olympics. At the trials, Ziemek set the world record in the decathlon jumping events with performances of 7.74 in the long jump, 2.14 in the high jump, and 5.55 in the pole vault. Only three other men have ever gone higher in an 8000+pt decathlon: Erki Nool (5.60 m in his 8628, 1998), Aleksandr Averbukh (5.60 m in his 8084, 1997) and Timothy Bright (5.70 m in his 8216, 1988)

His main personal bests are 8676 points in the decathlon (Eugene 2022) and 6173 points in the indoor heptathlon (Birmingham 2016).

Ziemek resides in Sun Prairie, WI and trains at his alma mater the University of Wisconsin-Madison. He is coached by Nate Davis, assistant coach for the Wisconsin track & field team. He is married to Victoria Paulson Ziemek.

== Competition record ==
Year	Competition	Venue	Position	Event	Notes
Representing the United States
2015	World Championships	Beijing, China	15th	Decathlon	8006 pts
2016	Olympic Games	Rio de Janeiro, Brazil	7th	Decathlon	8392 pts
2017	World Championships	London, United Kingdom	–	Decathlon	DNF
2018	World Indoor Championships	Birmingham, United Kingdom	6th	Heptathlon	5941 pts
2021	Olympic Games	Tokyo, Japan	6th	Decathlon	8435 pts
2022	World Championships	Eugene, United States	3rd	Decathlon	8676 pts
2023	World Championships	Budapest, Hungary	—	Decathlon	DNF
2024	Olympic Games	Paris, France	17th	Decathlon	7983 pts

== Personal bests ==
Outdoor
- 100 metres – 10.46 (0.2 m/s) (Eugene 2024)
- 400 metres – 49.04 (Eugene 2016)
- 1500 metres – 4:38.38 (Tokyo 2021)
- 110 metres hurdles – 14.29 (+1.6 m/s) (Madison 2017)
- High jump – 2.14 (Eugene 2021)
- Pole vault – 5.55 (Eugene 2021)
- Long jump – 7.73 (+1.7 m/s) (Eugene 2014)
- Shot put – 15.83 (Eugene 2024)
- Discus throw – 51.64 (Fayetteville 2022)
- Javelin throw – 62.55 (Madison 2023)
- Decathlon – 8676 (Eugene 2022)
Indoor
- 60 metres – 6.75 (Birmingham 2016)
- 1000 metres – 2:48.25 (Geneva, OH 2013)
- 60 metres hurdles – 8.03 (Iowa City 2018)
- High jump – 2.06 (Geneva, OH 2013)
- Pole vault – 5.40 (Fayetteville 2013)
- Long jump – 7.48 (Birmingham 2016)
- Shot put – 14.53 (Birmingham 2016)
- Heptathlon – 6173 (Birmingham 2016)
