= 2018 IAAF World Indoor Championships – Men's heptathlon =

Men's heptathlon at the 2018 IAAF World Indoor Championships
- Venue: Arena Birmingham
- Dates: 2–3 March
- Competitors: 12 from 10 nations
- Winning points: 6348

Medalists
gold medal	Kevin Mayer	France
silver medal	Damian Warner	Canada
bronze medal	Maicel Uibo	Estonia

Video on YouTube Official Video

The men's heptathlon at the 2018 IAAF World Indoor Championships took place on 2 and 3 March 2018.

The winning margin was 5 points which as of July 2024 remains the joint-narrowest winning margin in the men's heptathlon at these championships. The gold medallist achieved the best score in the shot put.

== Summary ==
With the retirement of defending champion Ashton Eaton, the multi-event world opened up. 2016 Olympic silver medalist Kévin Mayer assumed the top spot winning the 2017 World Championships. His pursuers included Olympic bronze medalist Damian Warner and world championship bronze medalist Kai Kazmirek.

In the 60 metres, Warner ran the top time of 6.74, his personal best, but Mayer was only .11 behind, also running his personal best, putting Warner 41 points ahead. In the long jump, Kazmirek boomed a 7.68 m (25 ft 2 1/4 in) personal best to offset one of the poorer 60 metre times to move into a tight group fighting for third place. Oleksiy Kasyanov actually held an 8-point advantage in third, with Dominik Distelberger joining the other two within 13 points of each other. At the top of the leader board, Mayer had another personal best of 7.55m in the long jump to pull within two points of Warner. In the shot put, Mayer overpowered Warner, his 15.67 m (51 ft 4 3/4 in) more than two feet further than Warner, who threw his personal best 14.90 m. Mayer had a 45-point lead. Kazmirek's personal best 14.55 m shot put put him 16 points up for third place. As the last event of the first day, Mayer and Warner topped out at 2.02 m, with Kazmirek gaining a little ground with a 2.05 m. At that height, Maicel Uibo had barely warmed up. Uibo kept clearing heights all the way up to 2.17 m (7 ft 1 1/4 in), which also moved him into a solid third place, exactly 100 points behind Mayer.

Warner began the second day with a 7.67 60 metres hurdles, 0.16 s better than Mayer and enough to pull him back to four points behind. Both Kazmirek and Uibo ran personal bests, but Kazmirek was .24 better to give him a 45 point advantage. Kasyanov pushed over a hurdle to take himself out of the race. In the pole vault, Warner got over a personal best 4.90m to only lose 10 cm and another 30 points to Mayer. Again on the vertical jump, Uibo excelled clearing a personal best of 5.30 m (17 ft 4 1/2 in), which was matched by Eelco Sintnicolaas who was still in sixth place, behind Zachery Ziemek. But Kazmirek had also jumped a personal best 5.20 m, so Uibo was still 13 points behind. In order to win the championship, Warner needed to beat Mayer by about 3 seconds in the 1000 meters, and Uibo needed to beat Kazmirek by about 1.3 seconds. Both Warner 2:37.12 and Uibo 2:38.51 ran personal bests in first and second place. Mayer was able to stay about 2 and a half seconds behind Warner to take the championship by a scant 5 points. Uibo beat Kazmirek by over 3 and a half seconds to take the bronze. Warner was able to beat Mike Smith's 25 year old Canadian national record.

== Detailed results ==
=== 60 metres ===
The 60 metres was held on 2 March at 09:59.

Rank	Heat	Name	Nationality	Result	Points	Notes
1	1	Damian Warner	Canada	6.74	977	PB
2	2	Kevin Mayer	France	6.85	936	PB
3	2	Zachery Ziemek	United States	6.89	922	SB
4	2	Dominik Distelberger	Austria	6.93	907	
5	2	Oleksiy Kasyanov	Ukraine	6.95	900	
6	2	Eelco Sintnicolaas	Netherlands	6.96	897	
7	2	Lindon Victor	Grenada	6.98	889	
8	1	Ruben Gado	France	6.99	886	SB
9	1	Jan Doležal	Czech Republic	7.04	868	
10	1	Kai Kazmirek	Germany	7.15	830	SB
11	1	Maicel Uibo	Estonia	7.20	813	SB
12	1	Kurt Felix	Grenada	7.21	809	SB

=== Long jump ===
The long jump was held on 2 March at 10:40.

Rank	Name	Nationality	#1	#2	#3	Result	Points	Notes	Total
1	Kai Kazmirek	Germany	7.08	7.68	7.18	7.68	980	PB	1810
2	Kevin Mayer	France	7.43	7.36	7.55	7.55	947	PB	1883
3	Oleksiy Kasyanov	Ukraine	x	7.43	x	7.43	918		1818
4	Maicel Uibo	Estonia	x	7.41	x	7.41	913	PB	1726
5	Damian Warner	Canada	7.11	7.39	x	7.39	908		1885
6	Dominik Distelberger	Austria	6.99	7.08	7.35	7.35	898		1805
7	Ruben Gado	France	7.26	x	x	7.26	876		1762
8	Zachery Ziemek	United States	7.09	6.96	7.21	7.21	864	SB	1786
9	Eelco Sintnicolaas	Netherlands	6.94	7.01	7.15	7.15	850	SB	1747
10	Jan Doležal	Czech Republic	6.96	7.04	6.84	7.04	823		1691
11	Kurt Felix	Grenada	6.93	x	x	6.93	797		1606
12	Lindon Victor	Grenada	x	x	5.55	5.55	492		1381

=== Shot put ===
The shot put was held on 2 March at 11:59.

Rank	Athlete	Nationality	#1	#2	#3	Result	Points	Notes	Total
1	Kevin Mayer	France	x	14.49	15.67	15.67	831		2714
2	Lindon Victor	Grenada	x	15.54	x	15.54	823	SB	2204
3	Damian Warner	Canada	14.90	x	13.89	14.90	784	PB	2669
4	Jan Doležal	Czech Republic	14.17	14.82	14.16	14.82	779	PB	2470
5	Kai Kazmirek	Germany	x	13.54	14.55	14.55	762	PB	2572
6	Kurt Felix	Grenada	14.35	14.39	x	14.39	752	SB	2358
7	Maicel Uibo	Estonia	14.30	14.01	14.19	14.30	747		2473
8	Oleksiy Kasyanov	Ukraine	14.03	14.16	x	14.16	738	SB	2556
9	Eelco Sintnicolaas	Netherlands	14.09	14.00	14.02	14.09	734		2481
10	Ruben Gado	France	13.61	13.12	13.17	13.61	704	PB	2466
11	Zachery Ziemek	United States	12.52	13.45	13.48	13.48	697		2483
12	Dominik Distelberger	Austria	12.46	12.21	13.04	12.24	670		2475

=== High jump ===
The high jump was held on 2 March at 19:44.

Rank	Group	Athlete	Nationality	1.81	1.84	1.87	1.90	1.93	1.96	1.99	2.02	2.05	2.08	2.11	2.14	2.17	2.20	Result	Points	Notes	Total
1	B	Maicel Uibo	Estonia	–	–	–	–	–	–	–	o	–	xo	o	xxo	xo	xxx	2.17	963	PB	3436
2	A	Kai Kazmirek	Germany	–	–	–	–	o	–	xo	xo	xxo	xxx					2.05	850	SB	3422
3	A	Zachery Ziemek	United States	–	–	–	–	–	o	o	o	xxx						2.02	822		3305
4	A	Damian Warner	Canada	–	–	–	o	o	o	o	xo	xxx						2.02	822	PB	3491
5	A	Kevin Mayer	France	–	–	–	–	o	–	xo	xo	xxx						2.02	822	SB	3536
6	A	Oleksiy Kasyanov	Ukraine	–	–	–	xo	o	o	xo	xo	xxx						1.99	794	SB	3155
7	B	Jan Doležal	Czech Republic	–	–	o	o	xxo	o	xxx								1.96	767		3237
8	B	Ruben Gado	France	–	o	o	o	xo	xxo	xxx								1.96	767		3233
9	B	Dominik Distelberger	Austria	–	xo	xo	o	xxo	xxx									1.93	740		3215
10	A	Eelco Sintnicolaas	Netherlands	o	–	o	o	xxx										1.90	714	SB	3195
11	B	Lindon Victor	Grenada	–	–	–	–	–	xxx									NM	0		2204
	B	Kurt Felix	Grenada															DNS			0

=== 60 metres hurdles ===
The 60 metres hurdles was held on 3 March at 09:59.

Rank	Heat	Name	Nationality	Result	Points	Notes	Total
1	2	Damian Warner	Canada	7.67	1066	SB	4557
2	2	Kevin Mayer	France	7.83	1025		4561
3	1	Kai Kazmirek	Germany	7.95	994	PB	4416
4	2	Eelco Sintnicolaas	Netherlands	7.97	989	SB	4184
5	2	Dominik Distelberger	Austria	7.98	987		4202
6	1	Zachery Ziemek	United States	8.14	947		4252
7	1	Maicel Uibo	Estonia	8.19	935	PB	4371
8	2	Jan Doležal	Czech Republic	8.20	932		4169
9	1	Ruben Gado	France	8.47	867		4100
	2	Oleksiy Kasyanov	Ukraine	DQ	0	168.7(b)	3378
	1	Lindon Victor	Grenada	DNS			0

=== Pole vault ===
Pole vault was held on 3 March at 11:07.

Rank	Athlete	Nationality	4.30	4.40	4.50	4.60	4.70	4.80	4.90	5.00	5.10	5.20	5.30	5.40	Result	Points	Notes	Total
1	Eelco Sintnicolaas	Netherlands	–	–	–	–	–	–	–	o	–	xo	o	xxx	5.30	1004		5188
2	Maicel Uibo	Estonia	–	–	–	–	–	–	–o	o	o	o	xo	xxx	5.30	1004	PB	5375
3	Kai Kazmirek	Germany	–	–	–	–	–	o	–	o	o	o	xxx		5.20	972	PB	5388
4	Ruben Gado	France	–	–	–	–	–	–	–	o	o	xxx			5.10	941		5041
4	Zachery Ziemek	United States	–	–	–	–	–	–	–	o	o	xxx			5.10	941		5193
6	Kevin Mayer	France	–	–	–	–	–	–	–	o	–	xxx			5.00	910		5471
7	Damian Warner	Canada	–	–	–	o	–	o	xxo	xxx					4.90	880	PB	5437
8	Dominik Distelberger	Austria	–	–	–	o	–	o	xxx						4.80	849		5051
9	Jan Doležal	Czech Republic	–	–	o	o	o	xxx							4.70	819		4988
	Oleksiy Kasyanov	Ukraine													DNS			0
	Lindon Victor	Grenada													DNS			0

=== 1000 metres ===
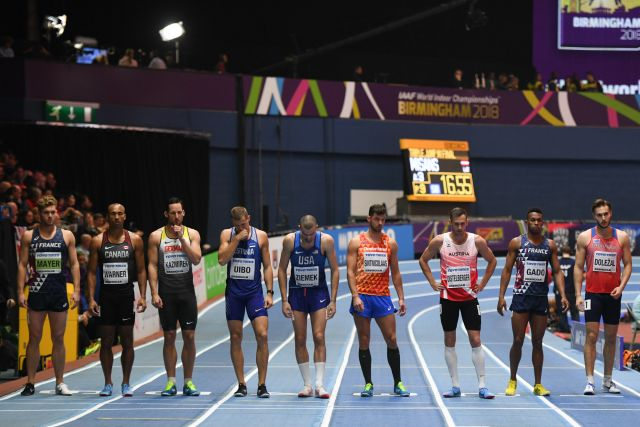
Athletes lining up for the final event

The 1000 metres was held on 3 March at 19:50.

Rank	Name	Nationality	Result	Points	Notes
1	Damian Warner	Canada	2:37.12	906	PB
2	Maicel Uibo	Estonia	2:38.51	890	PB
3	Ruben Gado	France	2:38.86	886	SB
4	Kevin Mayer	France	2:39.64	877	SB
5	Dominik Distelberger	Austria	2:41.49	857	SB
6	Kai Kazmirek	Germany	2:42.15	850	SB
7	Eelco Sintnicolaas	Netherlands	2:45.93	809	SB
8	Jan Doležak	Czech Republic	2:47.99	787	
9	Zachery Ziemek	United States	2:51.73	748	

== Overall results ==
After all events.

Key

The highest mark recorded in each event is highlighted in yellow

Key:	WL	World leading performance	NIR	National indoor record	PB	Personal best	SB	Seasonal best	DNS	Did not start	DNF	Did not finish	DQ	Disqualified	NM	No mark

Rank	Athlete	Nationality	Overall points	60 m	LJ	SP	HJ	60 m H	PV	1000 m
1st place, gold medalist(s)	Kevin Mayer	France	6348 WL	936; 6.85	947; 7.55	831; 15.67	822; 2.02	1025; 7.83	910; 5.00	877; 2:39.64
2nd place, silver medalist(s)	Damian Warner	Canada	6343 NIR	977; 6.74	908; 7.39	784; 14.90	822; 2.02	1066; 7.67	880; 4.90	906; 2:37.12
3rd place, bronze medalist(s)	Maicel Uibo	Estonia	6265 PB	813; 7.20	913; 7.41	747; 14.30	963; 2.17	935; 8.19	1004; 5.30	890; 2:38.51
4	Kai Kazmirek	Germany	6238 PB	830; 7.15	980; 7.68	762; 14.55	850; 2.05	994; 7.95	972; 5.20	850; 2:42.15
5	Eelco Sintnicolaas	Netherlands	5997 SB	897; 6.96	850; 7.15	734; 14.09	714; 1.90	989; 7.97	1004; 5.30	809; 2:45.93
6	Zachery Ziemek	United States	5941	922; 6.89	864; 7.21	697; 13.48	822; 2.02	947; 8.14	941; 5.10	748; 2:51.73
7	Ruben Gado	France	5927	886; 6.99	876; 7.26	704; 13.61	767; 1.96	867; 8.47	941; 5.10	886; 2:38.86
8	Dominik Distelberger	Austria	5908	907; 6.93	898; 7.35	670; 13.04	740; 1.93	987; 7.98	849; 4.80	857; 2:41.49
9	Jan Doležal	Czech Republic	5775	868; 7.04	823; 7.04	779; 14.82	767; 1.96	932; 8.20	819; 4.70	787; 2:47.99
	Oleksiy Kasyanov	Ukraine	DNF	900; 6.95	918; 7.43	738; 14.16	822; 2.02	0 DQ	DNS	DNS
	Lindon Victor	Grenada	DNF	889; 6.98	492; 5.55	823; 15.54	0 NM	DNS	DNS	DNS
	Kurt Felix	Grenada	DNF	809; 7.21	797; 6.93	752; 14.39	DNS	DNS	DNS	DNS
