= 2019 Hypo-Meeting =

- Venue: Mösle stadium
- Location: Götzis, Vorarlberg, Austria
- Dates: May 25–May 26
- Website: https://meeting-goetzis.at/en/

Champions
- Men: (Canada) Damian Warner (8711)
- Women: (United Kingdom) Katarina Johnson-Thompson (6813)

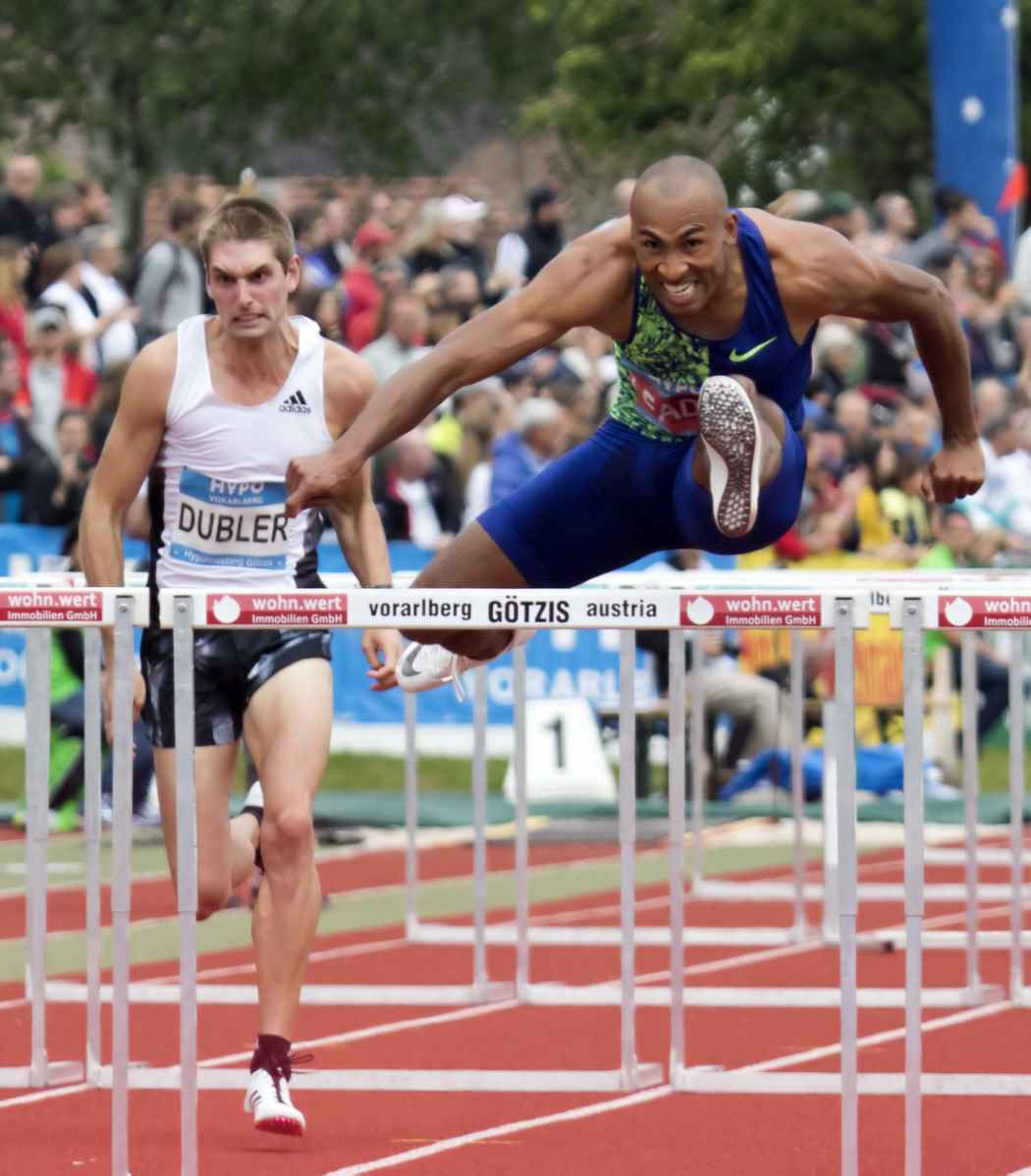
Cedric Dubler (left) and Damian Warner (right) at the 2019 Hypo-Meeting in Götzis

The 45th edition of the annual Hypo-Meeting took place on May 25 and May 26, 2019 in Götzis, Vorarlberg (Austria). The track and field competition, featuring a men's decathlon and a women's heptathlon event is part of the 2019 IAAF Combined Events Challenge.

On the first day, Damian Warner succeeded in finishing the 100 metres in 10.12 seconds, setting a new world record for this discipline in the decathlon.

== Men's decathlon ==
=== Schedule ===
May 25
1. 100 m
2. Long Jump
3. Shot Put
4. High Jump
5. 400 m

May 26
6. 110 m hurdles
7. Discus Throw
8. Pole Vault
9. Javelin Throw
10. 1,500 m

=== Records ===
World Record	Kevin Mayer (FRA)	9126	16 September 2018	Talence, France
Event Record	Roman Šebrle (CZE)	9026	27 May 2001	Götzis, Austria

=== Results ===
The best mark recorded in each event is highlighted in yellow

Rank	Athlete	Decathlon										Points
Rank	Athlete	100	LJ	SP	HJ	400	110H	DT	PV	JT	1500	Points
1	Damian Warner (CAN)	10.12	7.67	15.34	2.00	47.38	13.64	47.23	4.60	63.67	4:37.39	8711
2	Lindon Victor (GRN)	10.56	7.43	16.02	2.00	49.22	14.86	54.03	4.80	66.48	4:56.37	8473
3	Maicel Uibo (EST)	11.22	7.28	14.95	2.15	50.93	14.68	46.38	5.30	62.50	4:37.95	8353
4	Niklas Kaul (GER)	11.25	7.10	15.10	1.97	49.05	14.70	46.90	4.80	71.49	4:20.52	8336
5	Pieter Braun (NED)	11.10	7.57	15.09	1.97	49.26	14.42	44.31	4.90	64.19	4:30.60	8306
6	Kai Kazmirek (GER)	10.84	7.59	14.94	2.00	47.33	14.39	41.37	4.80	59.09	4:45:02	8224
7	Tim Nowak (GER)	11.12	7.28	14.86	2.00	50.16	14.64	47.27	4.80	60.11	4:20.66	8209
8	Cedric Dubler (AUS)	10.69	7.39	12.81	2.06	48.26	14.21	41.34	4.90	55.30	4:29.69	8185
9	Manuel Eitel (GER)	10.41	7.32	14.64	2.00	48.52	14.42	41.90	4.80	57.27	4:50.48	8128
10	Jorge Urena (ESP)	10.76	7.34	13.97	2.00	48.36	13.99	37.74	4.80	57.03	4:28.71	8123
11	Mathias Brugger (GER)	11.04	7.30	15.26	1.94	48.28	14.42	40.55	4.80	55.29	4:28.03	8060
12	Janek Õiglane (EST)	11.28	7.26	15.06	1.91	50.82	14.81	43.75	4.90	69.00	4:34.64	8050
13	Ashley Moloney (AUS)	10.41	7.52	13.69	2.03	46.97	14.24	41.98	4.40	56.19	5:03.20	8038
14	Martin Roe (NOR)	10.91	7.42	15.11	1.91	49.93	15.24	47.31	4.50	62.48	4:34.00	8023
15	Fredrik Samuelsson (SWE)	11.10	7.40	14.02	2.00	49.76	14.65	45.19	4.80	56.39	4:33.99	8022
16	Ilya Shkurenyov (ANA)	11.14	7.27	14.00	1.97	50.01	14.74	45.35	5.10	58.40	4:45.58	7982
17	Timothy Duckworth (GBR)	10.61	7.72	12.80	2.09	50.06	14.44	42.22	4.90	51.27	4:57.65	7981
18	Paweł Wiesiołek (POL)	10.76	7.23	14.13	2.00	49.48	15.08	45.53	4.90	52.25	4:38.66	7971
19	Devon Williams (USA)	10.85	7.19	13.16	1.85	49.16	14.00	46.28	4.80	59.56	4:49.42	7924
20	Marcus Nilsson (SWE)	11.23	7.30	15.34	2.00	49.85	14.73	45.42	4.60	50.62	4:36.00	7883
21	Oleksiy Kasyanov (UKR)	10.69	7.23	14.02	1.91	50.05	14.40	48.37	4.60	48.15	4:37.28	7874
22	Niels Pittomvils (BEL)	11.30	6.82	13.66	1.94	49.97	14.84	42.66	4.80	47.39	4:39.28	7510
23	Andri Oberholzer (SUI)	11.28	6.98	14.26	1.91	50.85	15.00	40.43	4.80	46.15	4:37.89	7449
24	Romain Martin (FRA)	11.07	7.01	14.23	NM	50.42	14.59	40.73	4.90	50.17	4:40.69	7073
25	Tim Ehrhardt (USA)	10.96	7.00	12.93	1.94	48.93	15.74	39.21	5.30	42.61	DNF	6856
	Dominik Distelberger (AUT)	10.97	7.31	13.15	1.88	49.47	14.62	40.40	5.00	46.66	DNS	DNF
	Artem Makarenko (ANA)	10.85	NM	14.02	2.00	48.73	14.04	37.13	4.50	49.17	DNS	DNF
	Vitaliy Zhuk (BLR)	10.94	6.94	15.62	NM	48.94	14.65	45.02	2.50	DNS	—	DNF
	Simone Cairoli (ITA)	10.97	7.04	13.50	1.91	49.54	14.91	34.99	DNS	—	—	DNF
	Karl Robert Saluri (EST)	10.71	7.37	14.33	NM	48.99	DNF	41.53	DNS	—	—	DNF
	Luca Bernaschina (SUI)	11.38	7.10	13.79	1.79	DQ	DNS	—	—	—	—	DNF
	Keisuke Ushiro (JPN)	11.37	NM	14.41	1.94	51.55	DNS	—	—	—	—	DNF
	Eelco Sintnicolaas (NED)	10.91	7.22	14.27	1.79	DNS	—	—	—	—	—	DNF
	Rico Freimuth (GER)	10.74	6.99	13.19	DNS	—	—	—	—	—	—	DNF

== Women's heptathlon ==
=== Schedule ===
May 25
1. 100 m hurdles
2. High Jump
3. Shot Put
4. 200 m

May 26
5. Long Jump
6. Javelin Throw
7. 800 m

=== Records ===
World Record	Jackie Joyner-Kersee (USA)	7291	September 24, 1988	Seoul, South Korea
Event Record	Nafissatou Thiam (BEL)	7013	May 28, 2017	Götzis, Austria

=== Results ===
The best mark recorded in each event is highlighted in yellow

Rank	Athlete	Heptathlon							Points
Rank	Athlete	100H	HJ	SP	200m	LJ	JT	800m	Points
1	Katarina Johnson Thompson (GBR)	13.29	1.95	12.95	23.21	6.68	42.92	2:08.28	6813
2	Laura Ikauniece (LAT)	13.46	1.77	13.34	24.19	6.20	54.13	2:13.51	6476
3	Xénia Krizsán (HUN)	13.43	1.77	14.13	24.46	6.24	49.28	2:10.48	6469
4	Carolin Schäfer (GER)	13.24	1.77	13.45	24.03	6.09	51.07	2:14.25	6429
5	Kendell Williams (USA)	12.84	1.80	12.87	23.69	6.36	42.92	2:16.65	6412
6	Erica Bougard (USA)	13.00	1.83	13.45	243.65	6.15	40.55	2:08.24	6374
7	Nadine Broersen (NED)	13.53	1.77	14.76	24.95	6.13	47.66	2:16.68	6297
8	Sophie Weißenberg (GER)	13.73	1.77	14.02	24.26	6.38	44.36	2:17.06	6293
9	Emma Oosterwegel (NED)	13.63	1.71	12.58	24.45	6.10	52.75	2:13.25	6247
10	Géraldine Ruckstuhl (SUI)	14.01	1.77	14.05	25.03	5.67	54.80	2:14.84	6197
11	Adrianna Sułek (POL)	14.13	1.83	12.92	24.22	6.15	38.56	2:13.77	6104
12	Annie Kunz (USA)	13.56	1.74	14.44	24.27	6.09	38.00	2:16.63	6098
13	Daryna Sloboda (UKR)	14.04	1.80	13.94	25.28	5.95	41.09	2:09.63	6094
14	Hanne Maudens (BEL)	13.97	1.74	12.32	24.11	6.39	37.83	2:11.26	6082
15	Sarah Lagger (AUT)	14.04	1.74	14.14	25.09	5.89	45.25	2:15.51	6042
16	Georgia Ellenwood (CAN)	13.58	1.71	12.47	24.38	5.95	44.14	2:14.35	6026
17	Adriana Rodríguez (CUB)	13.40	1.80	12.85	24.49	6.31	34.24	2:21.24	6004
18	Chari Hawkins (USA)	13.41	1.68	12.27	24.48	6.12	44.15	2:19.46	5972
19	Ekaterina Voronina (UZB)	14.74	1.74	12.81	25.19	6.06	48.25	2:16.19	5933
20	Annik Kälin (SUI)	13.80	1.68	11.90	24.82	6.17	44.98	2:17.38	5918
21	Allison Halverson (USA)	13.64	1.65	11.55	24.19	5.99	42.33	2:12.76	5909
22	María Vicente (ESP)	13.62	1.71	11.60	24.06	6.31	39.66	2:22.99	5900
23	Caroline Agnou (SUI)	13.96	1.62	14.21	25.27	5.96	46.44	2:20.90	5852
24	Grit Sadeiko (EST)	13.30	1.71	13.35	24.72	5.97	44.42	DNF	5203
25	Carmen Ramos (ESP)	14.65	1.62	11.72	26.54	5.53	40.60	2:24.24	5196
26	Esther Turpin (FRA)	13.43	1.65	13.60	24.87	NM	42.60	2:17.34	5098
27	Marthe Koala (BUR)	13.21	1.71	12.55	24.20	5.95	38.80	DNF	5095
28	Lindsay Schwartz (USA)	13.74	NM	13.41	24.27	5.50	39.07	2:16.44	4947
	Celeste Mucci (AUS)	13.02	1.71	11.50	24.05	6.06	39.23	DNS	DNF
	Mareike Arndt (GER)	14.61	1.62	14.37	23.73	5.83	42.60	DNS	DNF
	Katerina Cachová (CZE)	13.61	1.68	11.81	25.01	DNS	—	—	DNF
	Anna Maiwald (GER)	13.77	1.65	12.68	DNS	—	—	—	DNF
	Niki Oudenaarden (CAN)	14.07	1.65	12.87	DNS	—	—	—	DNF
	Niamh Emerson (GBR)	13.85	1.81	DNS	—	—	—	—	DNF

== See also ==
- Hypo-Meeting
- Götzis
- Vorarlberg
- Decathlon
