= Karel Tilga =

Estonian athlete (born 1998)

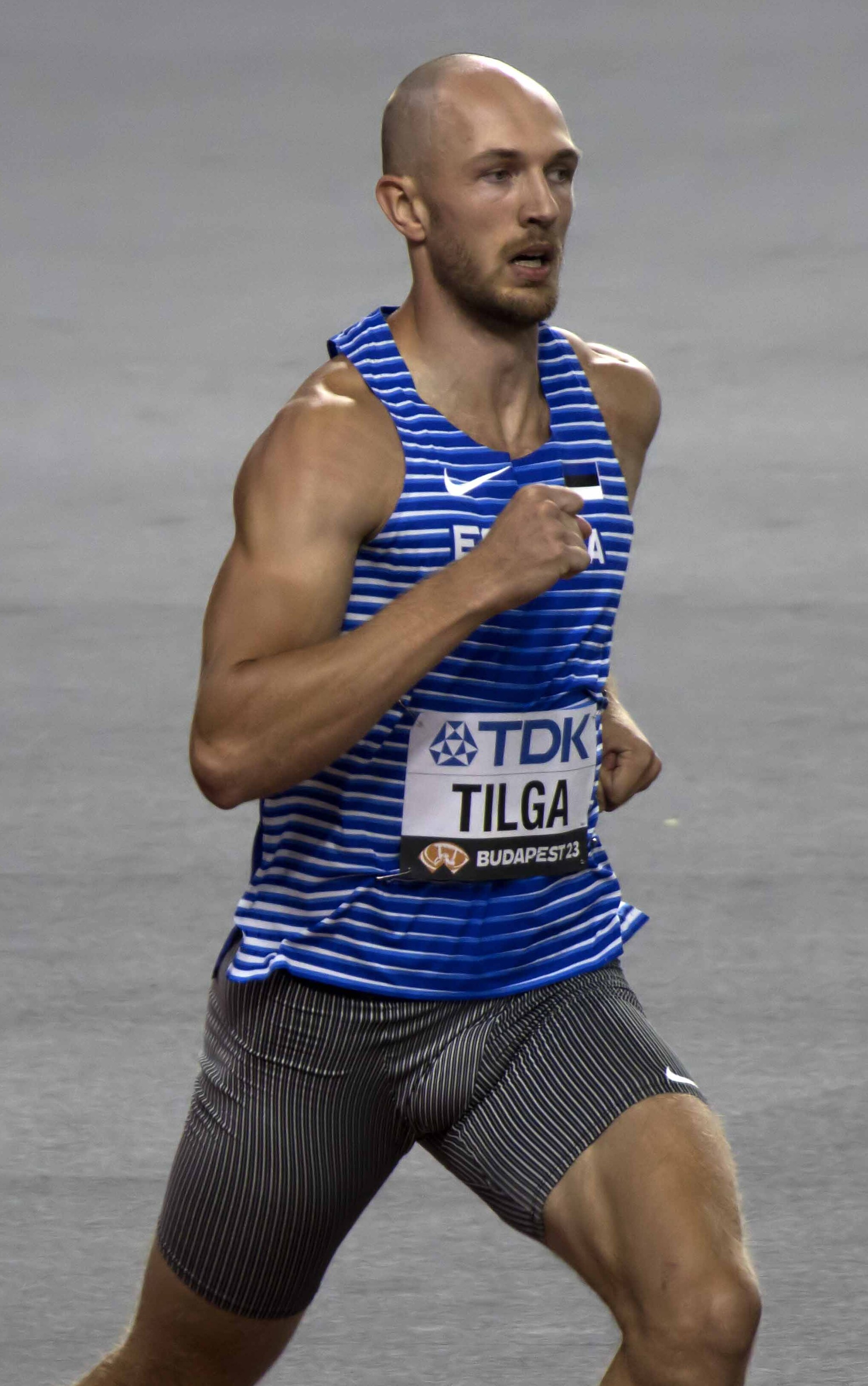
- Tilga in 2023

Personal information
- Born: 5 February 1998 (age 28) Valga, Estonia
- Height: 200 cm (6 ft 7 in)
- Weight: 95 kg (209 lb)

Sport
- Country: Estonia
- Sport: Athletics
- Events: Decathlon, Heptathlon
- College team: Georgia Bulldogs
- Coached by: Petros Kyprianou

Achievements and titles
- Personal bests: Decathlon: 8,681 (2023); Heptathlon: 6,264 (2021)

Karel Tilga (born 5 February 1998) is an Estonian multi-event athlete who competes in the decathlon and indoors heptathlon. He was the NCAA championships both indoors and outdoors in 2021. He competed at the 2020 and 2024 Olympic Games.

== Early life ==
Tilga was born in Valga and grew up in Puka until the eight grade, when the family moved to Tartu. He attended school at Tartu Kristjan Jaak Petersoni Gymnasium before enrolling at the University of Georgia, graduating in 2022.

== Career ==
Competing for Georgia Bulldogs (men), he won their fifth ever NCAA individual title (second in the heptathlon) by scoring a school record 6,264 to win the heptathlon at the 2021 NCAA Division I Indoor Track and Field Championships in March 2021, in Fayetteville, Arkansas. with the No. 2 all-time collegiate performance. He scored a near 400 point-improvement on his decathlon lifetime best at the Specs Town Invitational in Athens, Georgia in April 2021 besting Garrett Scantling by just 8 points. Tilga's score reached the Olympic qualifying standard of 8350 points. He then won the 2021 Outdoor NCAA Championships in the decathlon in Eugene, Oregon. At the delayed 2020 Olympic Games in Tokyo, Japan in 2021, he received 0 in pole vault and eventually finished 20th overall. He did not finish the 2022 European Championships after also receiving 0 in pole vault.

Tilga finished fourth in the decathlon at the 2023 World Championships in Budapest, Hungary. Tilga was selected as the best male athlete of April 2021 of the European Athletics Association (EAA) and the best male athlete of Estonia in 2023.

He competed in Paris at the 2024 Summer Olympics in the decathlon, finishing in eleventh place overall.

In September 2025, he competed in the decathlon at the 2025 World Athletics Championships in Tokyo, Japan.

In August, he competed at the 2026 European Athletics Championships in Birmingham, England, placing fifth overall in decathlon. He finished the season placed eighth in the 2026 World Athletics Combined Events Tour rankings.

== International competitions ==
Year	Competition	Venue	Position	Event	Result
Representing Estonia
2017	European U20 Championships	Grosseto	3rd	Decathlon U20	8002 pts
2018	European Championships	Berlin	–	Decathlon	DNF
2021	Olympic Games	Tokyo	20th	Decathlon	7018 pts
2022	World Indoor Championships	Belgrade	9th	Heptathlon	5964 pts
2022	European Championships	Munich	–	Decathlon	DNF
2023	World Championships	Budapest	4th	Decathlon	8681 pts
2024	Olympic Games	Paris	11th	Decathlon	8377 pts
2025	World Championships	Tokyo	16th	Decathlon	6073 pts
2026	European Championships	Birmingham	5th	Decathlon	8286 pts

== Personal bests ==
Information from World Athletics profile unless otherwise noted.

=== Outdoor ===
As of 20 June 2025

Event	Performance	Location	Date	Points
Decathlon	—N/a	Budapest	25–26 August 2023	8,604 points
100 metres	10.84 (-0.1 m/s)	Budapest	25 August 2023	897 points
Long jump	7.69 m (25 ft 2 3/4 in) (0.0 m/s)	Athens, Georgia	9 April 2021	982 points
Shot put	16.59 m (54 ft 5 in)	Ratingen	22 June 2024	888 points
High jump	2.10 m (6 ft 10 1/2 in)	Athens, Georgia	9 April 2021	896 points
400 metres	48.49	Götzis	27 May 2023	886 points
110 metres hurdles	14.65 (-0.1 m/s)	Götzis	28 May 2023	892 points
Discus throw	51.47 m (168 ft 10 1/4 in)	Götzis	1 June 2025	901 points
Pole vault	4.80 m (15 ft 8 3/4 in)	Budapest	26 August 2023	849 points
Javelin throw	73.36 m (240 ft 8 in)	Tokyo	5 August 2021	941 points
1500 metres	4:20.73	Budapest	26 August 2023	807 points
Virtual Best Performance				8,939 points

=== Indoor ===
As of 20 June 2025

Event	Performance	Location	Date	Points
Heptathlon	—N/a	Fayetteville	11–12 March 2021	6,264 points
60 metres	7.07	Belgrade	18 March 2022	858 points
Long jump	7.54 m (24 ft 8 3/4 in)	Belgrade	18 March 2022	945 points
Shot put	16.04 m (52 ft 7 1/4 in)	Fayetteville	11 March 2021	854 points
High jump	2.10 m (6 ft 10 1/2 in)	Tartu	19 January 2018	896 points
60 metres hurdles	8.24	Fayetteville	12 March 2021	922 points
Pole vault	4.96 m (16 ft 3 1/4 in)	Fayetteville	12 March 2021	898 points
1000 metres	2:36.32	Fayetteville	12 March 2021	915 points
Virtual Best Performance				6,288 points
