= Petros Kyprianou =

Athletic director at University of Illinois

Current position
- Title: Head coach
- Team: Illinois
- Conference: Big Ten

Biographical details
- Born: 1978 (age 47–48); Limassol, Cyprus
- Education: Aristotle University

Coaching career (HC unless noted)
- 2001–2005: Greece national team (assistant)
- 2003–2005: Nebraska–Omaha (assistant)
- 2005–2008: Boise State (assistant)
- 2008–2014: Georgia (assistant)
- 2014–2015: Georgia (associate HC)
- 2015–2021: Georgia
- 2022–present: Illinois

Accomplishments and honors

Championships
- NCAA Women's Indoor (2018); NCAA Men's Outdoor (2018); Big Ten Women's Indoor ([2024)

Awards
- MidWest Region Indoor Women's Coach of the Year (2026); MidWest Region Outdoor Women's Coach of the Year (2025); MidWest Region Indoor Women's Coach of the Year (2024); Big Ten Indoor Women's Coach of the Year (2024); Estonian U23 Coach of the Year Award (2020); Estonian Coach of the Year Award (2019); European Association Coaching award (2018); National Indoor Women's Coach of the Year (2018); National Outdoor Men's Coach of the Year (2018); South Region Indoor Women's Coach of the Year (2018); National Outdoor Women's Coach of the Year (2017); South Region Outdoor Women's Coach of the Year (2015, 2017); National Indoor Assistant Coach of the Year (2015); South Region Men's Indoor Assistant Coach of the Year (2015); National Women's Assistant Coach of the Year (2014); South Region Indoor Assistant Coach of the Year (2014); South Region Outdoor Assistant Coach of the Year (2014); West Region Indoor Assistant Coach of the Year (2008)

Petros Kyprianou is an American - Cypriot track and field coach. He is currently the director of track and field and cross country at the University of Illinois Urbana-Champaign and the former head coach of the University of Georgia track and field teams. Kyprianou was voted the United States Track & Field/CC Coaches Association 2018 Indoor & Outdoor National Coach of the Year following two historic first NCAA team titles for the University of Georgia track and field (women indoor & men outdoor). Additionally, Kyprianou was the 2017 Outdoor National Women's Coach of the Year following a very close NCAA runner-up finish to Oregon (1.8 points). The Bulldogs have amassed 12 top 4 NCAA finishes the last five seasons.

In his first 4 years at the University of Illinois, Kyprianou has elevated the Illini to a National powerhouse with a pair of trophies. His women's teams won the 2024 Big Ten Indoor title and, most recently, the 3rd place team trophy at the 2026 NCAA Indoor Championships. Kyprianou has developed and currently coaching several Olympians, World Championships medalists, NCAA & USA National champions, NCAA All Americans and American record holders, including:

- Kendell Williams
- Keturah Orji
- Maicel Uibo
- Levern Spencer
- Karl Robert Saluri
- Leontia Kallenou
- Devon Williams
- Chanice Porter
- Madeleine Fagan
- Kate Hall
- Karel Tilga
- Lynna Irby
- Garrett Scantling
- Johannes Erm
- Ken Mullings
- Rose Yeboah
- Ayden Owens-Delerme
- Heath Baldwin
- Sophia Beckmon

Kyprianou has served as an Olympic coach for four different Olympic national teams in the last three Olympic Games.
