= 2018 IAAF World U20 Championships – Men's decathlon =

Men's decathlon at the 2018 World U20 Championships
- Venue: Ratina Stadium
- Dates: 10–11 July
- Competitors: 14 from 10 nations
- Winning points: 8190

Medalists
gold medal	Ashley Moloney	Australia
silver medal	Gary Haasbroek	Australia
bronze medal	Simon Ehammer	Switzerland

The men's decathlon at the 2018 IAAF World U20 Championships was held at Ratina Stadium on 10 and 11 July.

== Records ==
Standing records prior to the 2018 IAAF World U20 Championships in Athletics
World U20 Record	Niklas Kaul (GER)	8435	Grosseto, Italy	23 July 2017
Championship Record	Niklas Kaul (GER)	8162	Bydgoszcz, Poland	20 July 2016
World U20 Leading	Stepan Kekin (ANA)	7817	Adler, Russia	21 May 2018

== Results ==
The highest mark recorded in each event is highlighted in yellow

Rank	Athlete	Nationality	100m	LJ	SP	HJ	400m	110m H	DT	PV	JT	1500m	Points	Notes
1st place, gold medalist(s)	Ashley Moloney	Australia	10.51; WD20B	7.06	12.83	2.10	46.86; WD20B	14.13	47.39	4.60	53.67	4:42.65	8190	CR, OCU20R, WU20L
2nd place, silver medalist(s)	Gary Haasbroek	Australia	10.92	7.26	13.28	2.01	49.20	14.26	40.54	4.30	55.25	4:35.48	7798	PB
3rd place, bronze medalist(s)	Simon Ehammer	Switzerland	11.14	7.45	13.44	2.01	50.15	14.13	36.22	4.70	49.09	4:47.36	7642	PB
4	Manuel Wagner	Germany	11.08	6.81	12.01	1.83	49.72	14.72	44.74	4.50	57.43	4:29.45	7552	PB
5	Finley Gaio	Switzerland	10.97	7.28	14.58	1.86	49.94	13.90	36.96	4.30	48.65	4:55.46	7455	
6	Leon Okafor	Austria	11.41	6.62	14.03	1.92	50.27	14.98	44.63	4.50	56.44	4:46.50	7454	NU20R
7	Kyle Garland	United States	10.97	6.40	15.11	2.01	50.59	13.99	42.56	4.00	53.00	4:58.42	7451	
8	Andreas Bechmann	Germany	11.30	6.81	14.17	1.92	48.92	14.97	42.74	4.40	41.96	4:43.48	7333	PB
9	Manuel Dias	Portugal	11.23	6.93	12.86	1.83	49.81	15.06	37.64	4.60	46.82	4:40.25	7212	NU20R
10	Juuso Toivonen	Finland	11.41	6.66	12.12	1.98	50.67	15.42	32.11	4.80	51.67	4:43.53	7113	PB
11	Stepan Kekin	Authorised Neutral Athletes	11.06	6.90	14.25	1.83	50.81	14.19	48.65	4.60	50.11	DNF	6984	
12	Ayden Owens-Delerme	Puerto Rico	10.67	6.94	13.71	1.92	DQ	13.74	42.72	4.30	43.06	4:44.76	6744	PB
	Makenson Gletty	France	10.82	6.98	16.03	1.98	DNF	DNS	–	–	–	–	DNF	
	Steven Fauvel-Clinch	France	11.08	6.91	12.86	1.92	DNS	–	–	–	–	–	DNF	
