= Ashley Moloney =

Australian decathlete

Ash Moloney
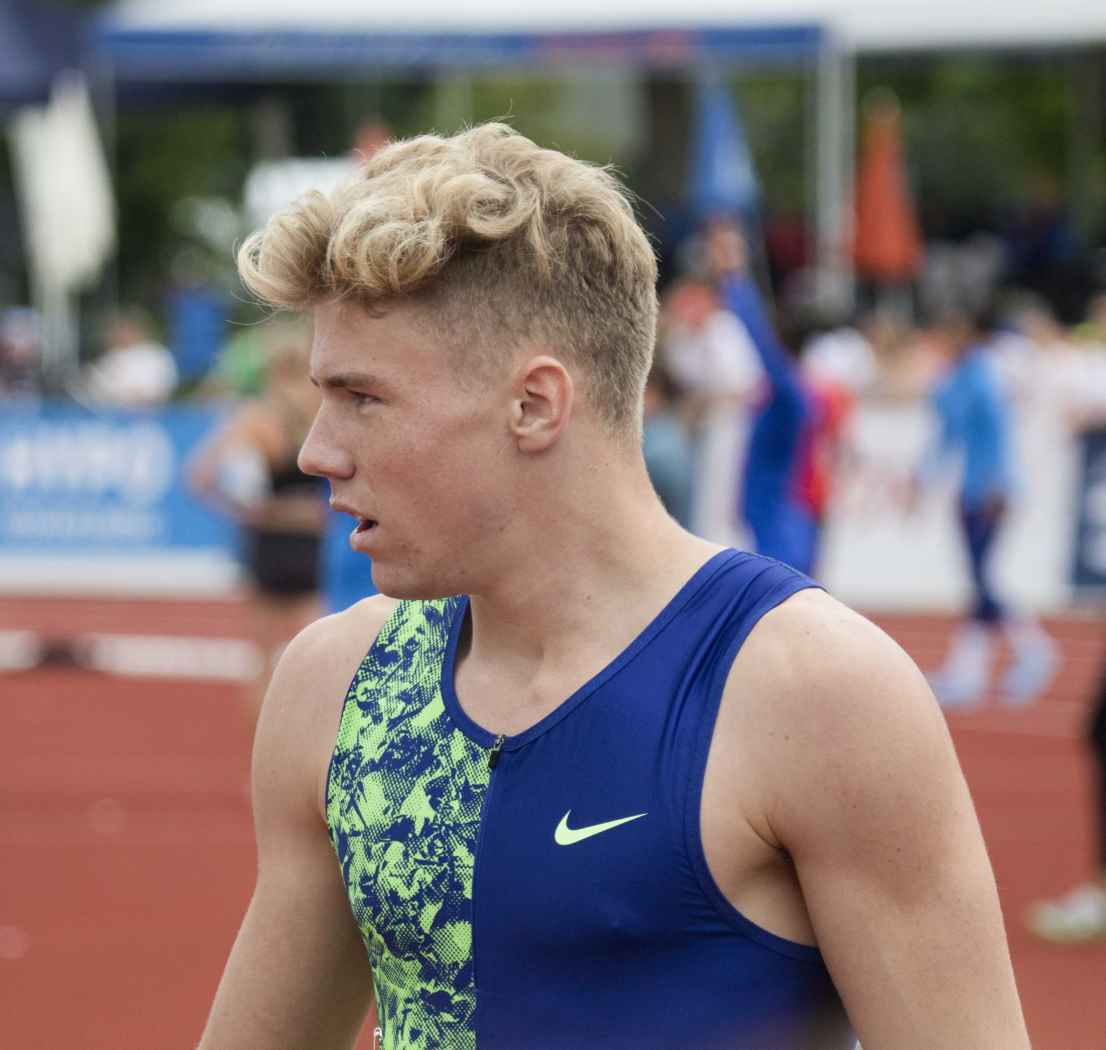
- Moloney in 2019

Personal information
- Full name: Ashley Moloney
- Born: 13 March 2000 (age 26) Brisbane, Queensland, Australia
- Height: 193 cm (6 ft 4 in)

Sport
- Country: Australia
- Sport: Athletics
- Events: Decathlon, Heptathlon
- Coached by: Steve Rippon

Achievements and titles
- Personal bests: Decathlon: 8,649 AR NR; Heptathlon: 6,344 AR NR
Medal record
Men's track and field
Representing Australia
Olympic Games
Bronze medal – third place	2020 Tokyo	Decathlon
World Indoor Championships
Bronze medal – third place	2022 Belgrade	Heptathlon
World Junior Championships
Gold medal – first place	2018 Tampere	Decathlon
Oceania Athletics Championships
Gold medal – first place	2024 Suva	Decathlon

Ashley Moloney (born 13 March 2000) is an Australian decathlete. He won bronze at the 2020 Olympic Games, the first Australian to win an Olympic medal in the decathlon.

== Early life ==
Moloney attended school in Browns Plains, a suburb in Logan Qld. Moloney was the fastest at primary school and enjoyed the crowd that gathered when he broke school high jump records. He competed in jumps, triple/high/pole and sprints for his school, region and state. In 2015, aged 15, he won the Australian All Schools U16 high jump title with a leap of 2.00 metres. Moloney competed in his first combined event on just two weeks of training.

Moloney's coach, Eric Brown, believed that Moloney could make the Olympics as a decathlete with a lot of hard work. In early 2016, in his second competition, he won the national U18 title, just days after he turned 16. In September 2016, he tallied 7328 with a sub-11 100m, 14+ metres in the shot, sub-14 hurdles, 4.60m vault and 4:50 1500m.

== Achievements ==
In 2017 Moloney broke the U18 Australian Decathlon Points Record previously held by Jake Stein.

He won the gold medal at the 2018 World Junior Championships in Tampere. In achieving this result, Moloney broke the Competition Record, previously held by Niklas Kaul, and the Oceania Junior Record previously held by Cedric Dubler. At the mid-2019 Oceania Championships, while still a teenager, Moloney scored 8103 points with the senior implements, raising the prospect of qualifying for the 2020 Olympics. Although injury in early 2020 threatened Ash's Olympic dream, the COVID-19 pandemic caused the Tokyo Olympics to be postponed and Moloney and his training partner Dubler were able to qualify for them at the end of 2020. In doing so Moloney broke the Australian senior and Oceanian records for the Decathlon, increasing Jagan Hames's previous records by 2 points to 8492 points.

In winning bronze at the 2020 Olympic Games, the first Australian decathlete to medal at an Olympics, he further improved the Oceanian and Australian record to 8649 points. Needing to complete the final 1500m event within several seconds of his closest points competitors, or better, the efforts of Ashley's fellow Australian decathlete Cedric Dubler to motivate him in the final stages of this race were lauded by the Australian and even world media as one of the most memorable moments of the Tokyo Olympics.

Moloney competed in the 2022 World Indoor Athletics Championships in the Men's Heptathlon where he finished the first day's competition in third place with 3,551 points. He finished in 3rd place with 6344 points, an Oceania Area Record and the highest third place tally ever for an indoor heptathlon.

Moloney was unable to finish the decathlon at the 2024 Summer Olympics after suffering an adductur injury during the long jump. In 2026, he began to focus on the 400m hurdles. He placed third in the 400 m hurdles at the Australian Championships on 12 April 2026, finishing behind Kyle Bennett and national champion Matthew Hunt.

== Personal bests ==
Outdoor

As of 19 June 2025

Event	Performance	Location	Date	Points
Decathlon	—N/a	Tokyo	4–5 August 2021	8,649 points
100 metres	10.34 (+0.2 m/s)	Tokyo	4 August 2021	1,013 points
Long jump	7.77 m (25 ft 5 3/4 in) (+0.5 m/s)	Brisbane	16 December 2023	1,002 points
Shot put	15.20 m (49 ft 10 1/4 in)	Götzis	27 May 2023	802 points
High jump	2.11 m (6 ft 11 in)	Brisbane	19 December 2020	915 points
400 metres	45.82	Brisbane	19 December 2020	1,017 points
110 metres hurdles	14.08 (-1.0 m/s)	Tokyo	5 August 2021	964 points
Discus throw	46.80 m (153 ft 6 1/2 in)	Suva	3 June 2024	804 points
Pole vault	5.05 m (16 ft 6 3/4 in)	Cairns	18 July 2021	926 points
Javelin throw	57.77 m (189 ft 6 1/4 in)	Brisbane	20 December 2020	704 points
1500 metres	4:39.19	Tokyo	5 August 2021	685 points
Virtual Best Performance				8,832 points

Indoor

As of 19 June 2025

Event	Performance	Location	Date	Points
Heptathlon	—N/a	Belgrade	18–19 March 2022	6,344 points
60 metres	6.70	Belgrade	18 March 2022	992 points
Long jump	7.82 m (25 ft 7 3/4 in)	Belgrade	18 March 2022	1,015 points
Shot put	13.89 m (45 ft 6 3/4 in)	Belgrade	18 March 2022	758 points
High Jump	2.02 m (6 ft 7 1/2 in)	Belgrade	18 March 2022	822 points
60 metres hurdles	7.88	Belgrade	19 March 2022	1,012 points
Pole vault	5.10 m (16 ft 8 3/4 in)	Belgrade	19 March 2022	941 points
1000 metres	2:43.01	Belgrade	19 March 2022	840 points
Virtual Best Performance				6,344 points

== International competition record ==
Year	Competition	Venue	Position	Event	Result
Representing Australia
2018	World Junior Championships	Tampere, Finland	1st	Decathlon (Junior)	8190 CR, AJR
2018	World Junior Championships	Tampere, Finland	7th	4 × 400 m relay	3:09:31
2019	Hypo-Meeting	Götzis, Austria	13th	Decathlon	8038
2019	Oceania Championships	Townsville, Australia	1st	Decathlon	8103
2021	Olympic Games	Tokyo, Japan	3rd	Decathlon	8649
2022	World Indoor Championships	Belgrade, Serbia	3rd	Heptathlon	6344
2022	World Championships	Eugene, United States	–	Decathlon	DNF
2023	Hypo-Meeting	Götzis, Austria	–	Decathlon	DNF
2023	World Championships	Budapest, Hungary	—	Decathlon	DNF
2024	Olympic Games	Paris, France	–	Decathlon	DNF

== Personal life ==
Moloney joined the Jimboomba Little Athletics Club when he was 12 years old. He hails from Logan in Southeast Queensland. He attended Regents Park State School and Browns Plains State High School.

Records
Preceded by Niklas Kaul	IAAF U20 World Championships Competition Record; 11 July 2018 – present	Succeeded by Incumbent
Preceded by Cedric Dubler	Oceanian Junior Decathlon; 11 July 2018 – present	Succeeded by Incumbent
Preceded by Jake Stein	Australia U18 Decathlon; 30 March 2017 – present	Succeeded by Incumbent
