= Garrett Scantling =

American decathlete (born 1993)

Personal information
- Born: May 19, 1993 (age 33) Jacksonville, Florida, U.S.
- Height: 6 ft 3 in (191 cm)
- Weight: 210 lb (95 kg)

Sport
- Country: United States
- Sport: Athletics (Track & Field)
- Event: Decathlon

Achievements and titles
- Personal bests: Decathlon: 8,867 (2022); Heptathlon: 6,469 (2022)

Garrett Scantling (born May 19, 1993) is an American decathlete. He finished fourth at the 2020 Olympic Games in Tokyo in the decathlon, after winning the U.S. Olympic Trials in Eugene, Oregon. He later also won the national decathlon title at the 2026 USA Outdoor Track and Field Championships.

== Early and personal life ==
Scantling is the son of Michael and Robby Scantling and the younger brother of Hunter Scantling, a former minor league pitcher in the Detroit Tigers organization. He attended Hendricks Day School in Jacksonville and graduated from Episcopal School of Jacksonville in 2011, competing in both football and track. Scantling later returned to coach track, football and weightlifting at the school during his three-year whereabouts suspension.

== Career ==
=== High school ===
Scantling caught 66 receptions for more than 1,200 yards and 13 touchdowns as a senior wide receiver at Episcopal, and set a number of school records in track.

=== College ===
He went on to compete in track and field at the University of Georgia, where he earned first-team All-American honors from 2012-2015. He won the 2015 NCAA indoor heptathlon and finished fourth in the decathlon at the U.S. Olympic Trials, failing to qualify for the 2016 Olympic Summer Games.

=== NFL ===
In 2017, Scantling signed a free-agent contract with the Atlanta Falcons as a wide receiver but did not make the active roster. He also worked out briefly with the Jacksonville Jaguars.

=== Olympics ===
In 2019, Scantling left his financial services job in Jacksonville and moved to Athens, Georgia, to train with his former college coach, Petros Kyprianou, and concentrate on the decathlon again. At his first indoor competition in January 2020, he scored a heptathlon personal best of 6,110 points and followed that up with another personal best of 6,209 to win the U.S. Indoor Championships at Annapolis in 2020.

In April 2021, in his first decathlon competition in nearly five years, he set another personal best with 8,476 points, including a long jump of 7.56 meters and a shot put of 16.20 meters, at a meet in Athens, Greece. He won the decathlon at the U.S. Olympic Team Trials in Eugene, Oregon in June 2021, scoring 8,647 points. At the delayed 2020 Summer Olympics held in August 2021, he finished fourth, scoring 8,611 points, including a personal best in the 400 metres and the 1500 metres.

Scantling scored 8,867 points to win the decathlon title at the 2022 USA Combined Events Championships in Fayetteville on 7 May 2022. However, in July 2022, Scantling was given a provisional suspension for anti-doping whereabouts and tampering violations. In November 2022, he was banned from competing for three years backdated to June 27, 2022, the date of his third whereabouts violation in a twelve-month period.

Returning to competition in June 2025, he took part in the decathlon at the 2025 USA Outdoor Track and Field Championships but did not complete the event. In 2025, he was hired as an assistant coach to Petros Kyprianou at the University of Illinois, with Kyprianou also continuing as Scantling's coach. On July 24, 2026, he returned to New York City's Randalls Island, this time winning the event to be national champion in decathlon at the 2026 USA Outdoor Track and Field Championships with 8,526 points ahead of Kyle Garland and Hakim McMorris. It was his first completed decathlon for four years and he won four of the individual events: long jump, shot put, 110 m hurdles, and javelin. He was the second oldest winner of the title at the age of 33 years old, behind only Kip Janvrin aged 35 in 2001.

== Personal bests ==
Information from World Athletics profile unless otherwise noted.

As of June 23, 2025

Event	Performance	Location	Date	Points
Decathlon	—N/a	Fayetteville	May 6–7, 2022	8,867 points
100 meters	10.53 (+1.8 m/s)	Eugene	June 29, 2021	968 points
Long jump	7.68 m (25 ft 2 1/4 in) (+2.0 m/s)	Fayetteville	May 6, 2022	980 points
Shot put	16.20 m (53 ft 1 3/4 in)	Athens, Georgia	April 9, 2021	864 points
High jump	2.13 m (6 ft 11 3/4 in)	Fayetteville	March 13, 2015	925 points
400 meters	48.25	Tokyo	August 4, 2021	897 points
110 meters hurdles	13.59 (+1.0 m/s)	Fayetteville	March 18, 2022	1,028 points
Discus throw	51.04 m (167 ft 5 1/4 in)	Fayetteville	May 7, 2022	892 points
Pole vault	5.07 m (16 ft 7 1/2 in)	Starkville	May 16, 2015	864 points
Javelin throw	69.37 m (227 ft 7 in)	Eugene	July 3, 2016	880 points
1500 meters	4:35.54	Tokyo	August 5, 2021	709 points
Virtual Best Performance				9,075 points

=== Indoor ===
As of June 23, 2025

Event	Performance	Location	Date	Points
Heptathlon	—N/a	Spokane	May 6–7, 2022	6,382 points
60 meters	6.84	Belgrade	March 18, 2022	940 points
Long jump	7.45 m (24 ft 5 1/4 in)	Annapolis	February 7, 2020	922 points
Shot put	16.37 m (53 ft 8 1/4 in)	Serbia	March 18, 2022	874 points
High jump	2.07 m (6 ft 9 1/4 in)	Athens, Georgia	April 10, 2014	868 points
60 meters hurdles	7.75	Serbia	February 5, 2022	1,046 points
Pole vault	5.22 m (17 ft 1 1/2 in)	Athens, Georgia	April 10, 2021	979 points
1000 meters	2:43.04	Spokane	February 27, 2022	840 points
Virtual Best Performance				6,469 points
