= Steve Bastien (decathlete) =

American decathlete (born 1994)

Personal information
- Full name: Steven Clete Bastien
- Born: March 4, 1994 (age 32)

Sport
- Country: United States
- Sport: Athletics
- Event: Decathlon
- College team: Samford Bulldogs (2013-14); Michigan Wolverines (2015-17)

Achievements and titles
- Personal bests: Decathlon: 8,485 (2021); Heptathlon: 6,074 (2022)

Steven Clete Bastien (born March 4, 1994) is an American decathlete.

== Early life and high school ==
Bastien began competing in track and field when he was eight years old, and did his first combined events when he was ten. As a senior at Saline High School, he won the state title in the long jump with a distance of 7.70 m (25 ft 3 in) and then finished fourth in the long jump at the New Balance Nationals Outdoor with a distance of 7.24 m (23 ft 9 in).

== College career ==
Bastien competed in track and field at Samford University, then transferred to the University of Michigan where he became a five time All-American.

== International career ==
Bastien finished in second place at the 2020 US Olympic Trials with a score of 8,485 points. At the Tokyo Olympics, he suffered a snapped pole during his first attempt at the pole vault, then finished in tenth place with a score of 8,236 points.

== Personal bests ==
Information from World Athletics profile unless otherwise noted.

=== Outdoor ===
As of June 25, 2025

Event	Performance	Location	Date	Points
Decathlon	—N/a	Eugene	July 19–20, 2021	8,485 points
100 meters	10.52 (+1.8 m/s)	Eugene	July 19, 2021	970 points
Long jump	7.70 m (25 ft 3 in) (+0.8 m/s)	Talence	September 17, 2022	985 points
Shot put	14.47 m (47 ft 5 1/2 in)	Eugene	July 19, 2021	757 points
High jump	2.08 m (6 ft 9 3/4 in)	Eugene	July 19, 2021	878 points
400 meters	47.44	Fayetteville	May 6, 2022	936 points
110 meters hurdles	14.24 (+1.9 m/s)	Eugene	July 20, 2021	944 points
110 meters hurdles	14.03 (+6.9 m/s)	Allendale	May 1, 2021	—N/a
Discus throw	42.58 m (139 ft 8 1/4 in)	Eugene	July 3, 2016	717 points
Pole vault	4.95 m (16 ft 2 3/4 in)	Des Moines	June 22, 2018	895 points
Javelin throw	61.20 m (200 ft 9 1/4 in)	Eugene	July 20, 2021	756 points
1500 meters	4:22.21	Eugene	July 20, 2021	797 points
Virtual Best Performance				8,635 points

=== Indoor ===
As of June 25, 2025

Event	Performance	Location	Date	Points
Heptathlon	—N/a	Belgrade	March 18–19, 2022	6,074 points
60 meters	6.84	Akron	February 3, 2017	940 points
Long jump	7.57 m (24 ft 10 in)	South Bend	January 21, 2017	952 points
Shot put	14.08 m (46 ft 2 1/4 in)	South Bend	January 23, 2016	733 points
High jump	2.08 m (6 ft 9 3/4 in)	Belgrade	March 18, 2022	878 points
60 meters hurdles	8.12	Ann Arbor	January 22, 2022	952 points
Pole vault	4.95 m (16 ft 2 3/4 in)	Albuquerque	February 25, 2023	895 points
1000 meters	2:36.85	Fayetteville	March 14, 2015	909 points
Virtual Best Performance				6,259 points

Event	Performance	Location	Date
200 meters	22.56	South Bend	February 2, 2013

== Personal life ==
Bastien is married to University of Michigan women's pole vault coach Kiley Bastien. His father is Eastern Michigan University men's track and field coach Gary Bastien.
