= Kai Kazmirek =

German decathlete

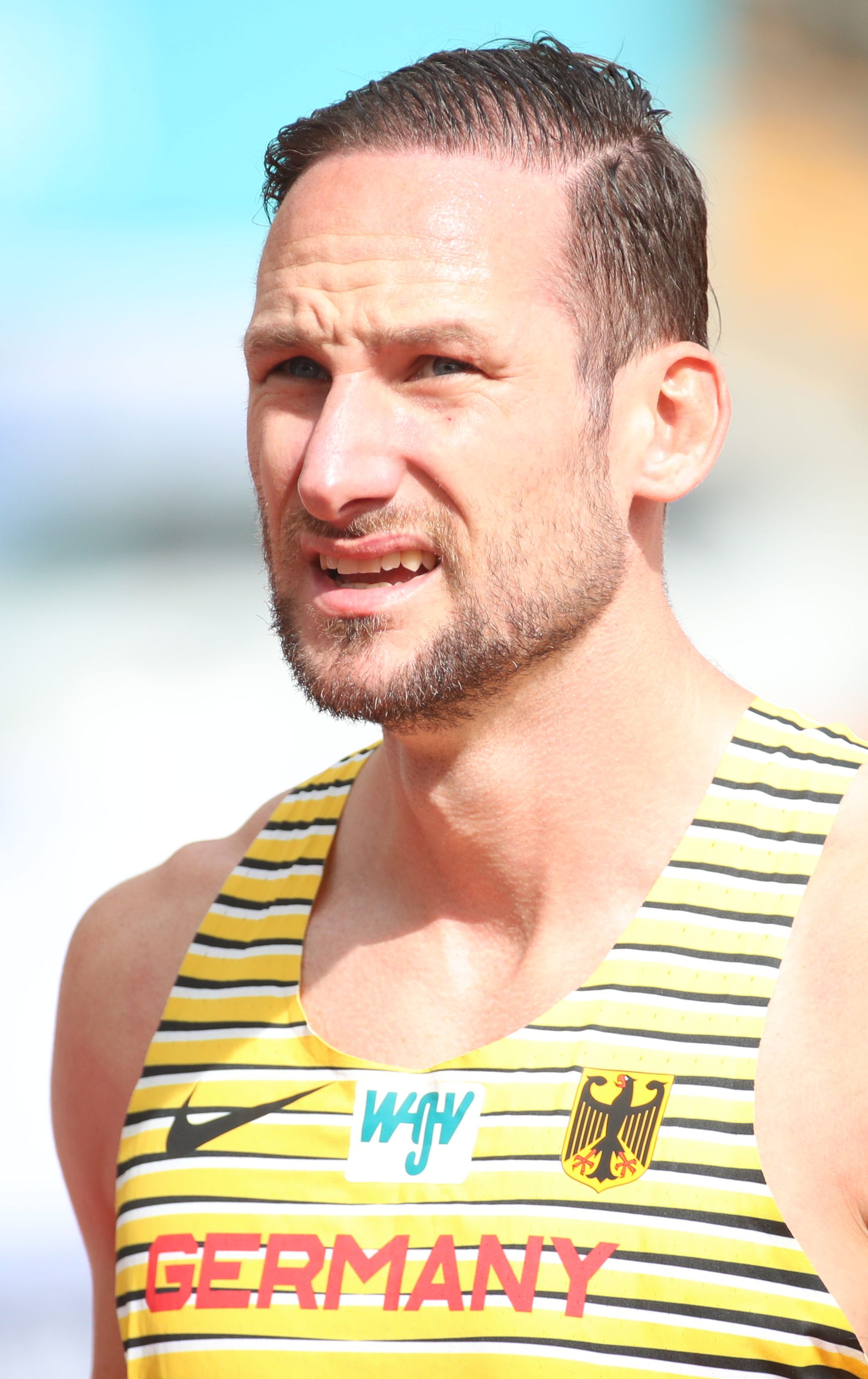
- Kai Kazmirek at the 2022 European Athletics Championships in Munich

Personal information
- Born: 28 January 1991 (age 35) Torgau, Germany
- Height: 1.90 m (6 ft 3 in)
- Weight: 88 kg (194 lb)

Sport
- Country: Germany
- Sport: Athletics
- Events: Decathlon, Heptathlon

Achievements and titles
- Personal bests: Decathlon: 8,580 (2016); Heptathlon: 6,238 (2018)
Medal record
Decathlon
World Championships
Bronze medal – third place	2017 London	Decathlon

Kai Kazmirek (born 28 January 1991) is a German track and field athlete who competes in the decathlon. He holds a personal best of 8580 points for the event achieved in Rio 2016, as well as an indoor heptathlon best of 6173 points. He is a member of LG Rhein-Wied athletics club.

He represented Germany at the 2014 IAAF World Indoor Championships, placing sixth. A two-time German champion (decathlon in 2012, heptathlon in 2014), he was also the winner at the 2013 European Athletics U23 Championships.

== Career ==
Born in Torgau, he initially specialised in the high jump and was the 2008 German youth champion in the event. He also competed in the combined events youth championships, coming seventh outdoors and fourth indoors. In 2009 he was indoor heptathlon runner-up at the national junior championships and also came third in the high jump. Outdoors, he placed third in the junior long jump, won in the junior decathlon section of the Mehrkampf-Meeting Ratingen, then claimed a bronze medal at the 2009 European Athletics Junior Championships in a personal best of 7639 points. The year after he won the German junior heptathlon title and improved his decathlon score to 7829 points. He placed sixth at both the 2010 World Junior Championships in Athletics and the 2011 European Athletics U23 Championships.

The 2012 Thorpe Cup saw him reach new heights in the senior division. He scored over eight thousand points for the first time and won the competition with a total of 8130 points. He won his first national title in the event but did not gain selection for the 2012 London Olympics as national rivals Rico Freimuth, Pascal Behrenbruch, and Jan Felix Knobel had all performed better on the decathlon circuit that year.

Kazmirek improved to 8350 points at the Ratingen meeting in 2013 and followed this up with an 8366-point best to win the gold medal at the 2013 European Athletics U23 Championships. However, again he was ranked outside of the top three nationally and was not selected for the 2013 World Championships in Athletics. He regarded this as a good thing, saying: "We have got a really strong Decathlon squad in Germany and I am really happy about that. We can learn so much from each other...I get an enormous amount from it". Kazmirek ranked ninth in Europe that year.

He opened the 2014 indoor season with a heptathlon best of 6083 points to win the German indoor title. This earned him his first senior international selection and he improved further at the 2014 IAAF World Indoor Championships, taking sixth overall with a total score of 6173.

== Personal bests ==
Information from World Athletics profile unless otherwise noted.

=== Outdoor ===
As of June 19, 2025

Event	Performance	Location	Date	Points
Decathlon	—N/a	Rio	17–18 August 2016	8,580 points
100 metres	10.62 (+1.1 m/s)	Götzis	28 May 2016	947 points
Long jump	7.74 m (25 ft 4 1/2 in)	Paris	24 August 2019	995 points
Shot put	14.94 m (49 ft 0 in)	Götzis	25 May 2019	786 points
High jump	2.15 m (7 ft 1/2 in)	Götzis	31 May 2014	944 points
400 metres	46.75	Ostrava	14 July 2011	971 points
110 metres hurdles	14.05 (+0.5 m/s)	Zurich	13 August 2014	968 points
Discus throw	46.46 m (152 ft 5 in)	Trier	14 May 2022	797 points
Pole vault	5.20 m (17 ft 1/2 in)	Tampere	12 July 2013	972 points
Javelin throw	64.60 m (211 ft 11 1/4 in)	Rio	18 August 2016	807 points
1500 metres	4:30.75	Götzis	27 May 2018	740 points
Virtual Best Performance				8,927 points

=== Indoor ===
As of June 19, 2025

Event	Performance	Location	Date	Points
Heptathlon	—N/a	Birmingham	2–3 March 2018	6,238 points
60 metres	7.01	Tallinn	6 February 2015	879 points
Long jump	7.68 m (25 ft 2 1/4 in)	Birmingham	2 March 2018	980 points
Shot put	14.55 m (47 ft 8 3/4 in)	Birmingham	2 March 2018	762 points
High jump	2.06 m (6 ft 9 in)	Kalbach-Riedberg	10 January 2010	859 points
60 metres hurdles	7.95	Birmingham	3 March 2018	994 points
Pole vault	5.20 m (17 ft 1/2 in)	Sopot	8 March 2014	972 points
1000 metres	2:39.51	Sopot	8 March 2014	879 points
Virtual Best Performance				6,325 points
