= Athletics at the 2024 Summer Olympics – Men's decathlon =

Men's decathlon at the Games of the XXXIII Olympiad
- Venue: Stade de France, Paris, France
- Dates: 2 August 2024; 3 August 2024
- Competitors: 22 from 13 nations
- Winning points: 8796 NR

Medalists
1st place, gold medalist(s)		Markus Rooth	Norway
2nd place, silver medalist(s)		Leo Neugebauer	Germany
3rd place, bronze medalist(s)		Lindon Victor	Grenada

The men's decathlon at the 2024 Summer Olympics was held in Paris, France, on 2 and 3 August 2024.

== Background ==
The men's decathlon has been present on the Olympic athletics programme since 1912. This was the 26th appearance of the event in the Olympic Games.

== Qualification ==
For the men's decathlon event, the qualification period was between 1 July 2023 and 30 June 2024.

== Schedule ==
All times are Central European Summer Time (UTC+2)

The men's decathlon took place over two consecutive days, with 5 events each day.

Date	Time	Round
2 August 2024	10:05; 10:55; 12:15; 18:00; 20:50	100 metres Long jump Shot put High jump 400 metres
3 August 2024	10:05; 10:55; 13:40; 19:10; 21:45	110 metres hurdles Discus throw Pole vault Javelin throw 1500 metres

== Records ==
Prior to this competition, the existing world, Olympic, and area records were as follows.

World record	Kevin Mayer (FRA)	9126	Talence, France	16 September 2018
Olympic record	Damian Warner (CAN)	9018	Tokyo, Japan	5 August 2021
World leading	Leo Neugebauer (GER)	8961	Eugene, United States	5-6 June 2024

Area	Points	Athlete	Nation
Africa (records)	8521	Larbi Bourrada	Algeria
Asia (records)	8725	Dmitriy Karpov	Kazakhstan
Europe (records)	9126 WR	Kevin Mayer	France
North, Central America and Caribbean (records)	9045	Ashton Eaton	United States
Oceania (records)	8492	Ashley Moloney	Australia
South America (records)	8393	Carlos Eduardo Chinin	Brazil

== Results ==
=== 100 metres ===
The 100 metres was started on 2 August 2024 at 10:05 (UTC +2).

Wind readings: Heat 1: +0.9 m/s; Heat 2: +1.4 m/s; Heat 3: +0.8 m/s.

Rank	Heat	Name	Nationality	Time	Points	Notes
1	3	Damian Warner	Canada	10.25	1035	
2	3	Ayden Owens-Delerme	Puerto Rico	10.35	1011	
3	3	Till Steinforth	Germany	10.52	970	
3	3	Sven Roosen	Netherlands	10.52	970	
5	3	Ashley Moloney	Australia	10.56	961	
5	3	Lindon Victor	Grenada	10.56	961	
7	3	Ken Mullings	Bahamas	10.60	952	
7	3	Zachery Ziemek	United States	10.60	952	
9	2	Harrison Williams	United States	10.62	947	SB
10	2	Johannes Erm	Estonia	10.64	942	
10	2	Rik Taam	Netherlands	10.64	942	
12	2	José Fernando Ferreira	Brazil	10.66	938	PB
13	2	Leo Neugebauer	Germany	10.67	935	
14	1	Markus Rooth	Norway	10.71	926	PB
15	2	Makenson Gletty	France	10.72	924	
16	1	Sander Skotheim	Norway	10.78	910	SB
17	1	Jorge Ureña	Spain	10.87	890	
18	1	Janek Õiglane	Estonia	10.89	885	=PB
19	2	Heath Baldwin	United States	10.91	881	
20	1	Karel Tilga	Estonia	11.01	858	SB
21	1	Daniel Golubovic	Australia	11.32	791	
22	1	Niklas Kaul	Germany	11.34	786	=SB

=== Long jump ===
The long jump was started on 2 August 2024 at 10:55 (UTC +2).

Rank	Group	Athlete	Nation	#1	#2	#3	Distance	Points	Notes	Overall points	Overall rank
1	B	Sander Skotheim	Norway	8.03	r		8.03	1068	PB	1978	4
2	B	Leo Neugebauer	Germany	7.76	7.70	7.98	7.98	1056	SB	1991	2
3	B	Markus Rooth	Norway	7.74	x	7.80	7.80	1010		1936	5
4	B	Damian Warner	Canada	7.79	7.57	x	7.79	1007		2042	1
5	B	Johannes Erm	Estonia	7.53	7.66	7.32	7.66	975		1917	8
6	A	Ayden Owens-Delerme	Puerto Rico	7.37	x	7.66	7.66	975	SB	1986	3
7	B	Till Steinforth	Germany	7.55	7.49	7.61	7.61	962		1932	6
8	B	Sven Roosen	Netherlands	x	7.56	r	7.56	950	PB	1920	7
9	B	Lindon Victor	Grenada	7.20	7.44	7.48	7.48	930		1891	9
10	A	Harrison Williams	United States	7.42	7.31	7.37	7.42	915		1862	10
11	B	Heath Baldwin	United States	x	7.38	x	7.38	905		1786	15
12	B	Ken Mullings	Bahamas	7.11	7.36	7.23	7.36	900		1852	11
13	A	Rik Taam	Netherlands	6.81	7.06	7.27	7.27	878	SB	1820	12
14	A	Janek Õiglane	Estonia	7.13	7.25	x	7.25	874		1759	17
15	A	José Fernando Ferreira	Brazil	6.82	x	7.24	7.24	871		1809	13
16	A	Karel Tilga	Estonia	7.16	x	7.14	7.16	852	SB	1710	20
17	B	Makenson Gletty	France	6.86	x	7.10	7.10	838		1762	16
18	A	Niklas Kaul	Germany	7.03	7.09	6.89	7.09	835		1621	21
19	A	Jorge Ureña	Spain	7.05	6.87	6.32	7.05	826		1716	19
19	B	Ashley Moloney	Australia	7.05	x	2.67	7.05	826		1787	14
21	A	Zachery Ziemek	United States	6.65	6.84	6.86	6.86	781		1733	18
22	A	Daniel Golubovic	Australia	6.56	6.52	6.60	6.60	720		1511	22

=== Shot put ===
The shot put was started on 2 August 2024 at 12:15.

Rank	Group	Athlete	Nation	#1	#2	#3	Distance	Points	Notes	Overall points	Overall rank
1	B	Makenson Gletty	France	16.37	x	16.64	16.64	891		2653	11
2	B	Leo Neugebauer	Germany	16.31	16.55	x	16.55	885		2876	1
3	B	Karel Tilga	Estonia	15.75	15.24	15.88	15.88	844		2554	14
4	B	Lindon Victor	Grenada	14.19	15.71	x	15.71	833	SB	2724	6
5	A	Harrison Williams	United States	14.25	15.26	15.66	15.66	830	PB	2692	8
6	B	Markus Rooth	Norway	14.89	15.03	15.25	15.25	805		2741	4
7	B	Ayden Owens-Delerme	Puerto Rico	14.81	14.69	15.17	15.17	800		2786	3
8	A	Sven Roosen	Netherlands	14.73	15.10	X	15.10	796	PB	2716	7
9	B	Zachery Ziemek	United States	15.03	x	14.91	15.03	792		2525	17
10	B	Johannes Erm	Estonia	14.17	14.61	14.57	14.61	766		2683	9
11	A	Janek Õiglane	Estonia	14.58	14.15	14.44	14.58	764		2523	18
12	B	Heath Baldwin	United States	14.48	14.18	x	14.48	758		2544	15
13	B	Damian Warner	Canada	14.41	14.45	13.92	14.45	756		2798	2
14	A	Sander Skotheim	Norway	13.81	13.67	14.31	14.31	747		2725	5
15	A	Rik Taam	Netherlands	14.27	14.23	13.97	14.27	745		2565	13
16	A	Niklas Kaul	Germany	13.96	14.10	14.24	14.24	743		2364	21
17	B	Ken Mullings	Bahamas	13.92	14.19	x	14.19	740		2592	12
18	A	José Fernando Ferreira	Brazil	13.74	13.97	x	13.97	727		2536	16
19	A	Till Steinforth	Germany	12.65	13.96	13.71	13.96	726		2658	10
20	A	Daniel Golubovic	Australia	13.49	13.78	13.89	13.89	722		2233	22
21	A	Jorge Ureña	Spain	13.26	13.77	13.72	13.77	714		2430	20
22	A	Ashley Moloney	Australia	13.40	13.33	12.95	13.40	692		2479	19

=== High jump ===
Rank	Group	Name	Nation	1.81	1.84	1.87	1.90	1.93	1.96	1.99	2.02	2.05	2.08	2.11	2.14	2.17	2.20	Result	Points	Notes	Overall points	Overall rank
1	B	Heath Baldwin	United States	–	–	–	–	–	o	–	o	o	xxo	o	o	xxo	xxx	2.17	963	PB	3507	8
2	B	Sander Skotheim	Norway	–	–	–	–	–	–	o	–	o	o	xxo	xxx			2.11	906		3631	2
3	B	Johannes Erm	Estonia	–	o	–	o	–	xo	o	o	o	o	xxx				2.08	878	PB	3561	5
4	B	Leo Neugebauer	Germany	–	–	o	o	o	xo	o	xo	xo	xxx					2.05	850		3726	1
5	B	Ken Mullings	Bahamas	–	–	–	–	–	o	–	xo	xxx						2.02	822		3414	12
5	B	Damian Warner	Canada	–	–	–	–	o	o	o	xo	xxx						2.02	822	SB	3620	3
7	A	Niklas Kaul	Germany	–	–	–	–	o	xo	xxo	xo	xxx						2.02	822	SB	3186	20
8	A	Ayden Owens-Delerme	Puerto Rico	–	o	o	o	xo	o	o	xxo	xxx						2.02	822	SB	3608	4
9	A	Lindon Victor	Grenada	–	–	–	–	xo	xo	xo	xxo	xxx						2.02	822		3546	6
10	B	Markus Rooth	Norway	–	–	–	–	o	–	o	xxx							1.99	794	=SB	3535	7
11	A	Janek Õiglane	Estonia	–	–	o	–	xo	o	o	r							1.99	794		3348	15
12	B	Makenson Gletty	France	–	–	–	–	o	xxo	o	xxx							1.99	794		3447	10
13	A	Karel Tilga	Estonia	–	–	–	–	o	o	xxo	xxx							1.99	794		3348	14
14	B	Zachery Ziemek	United States	–	–	–	–	–	o	–	xxx							1.96	767		3292	17
15	B	Jorge Ureña	Spain	–	–	xo	–	xo	xo	xxx								1.96	767		3197	19
16	B	Till Steinforth	Germany	o	xo	o	o	o	xxo	xxx								1.96	767		3425	11
16	A	Harrison Williams	United States	–	–	o	o	xo	xxo	xxx								1.96	767	SB	3459	9
18	A	Daniel Golubovic	Australia	–	o	o	o	xxo	xxx									1.93	740		2973	21
19	B	José Fernando Ferreira	Brazil	o	o	o	xo	xxo	xxx									1.93	740		3275	18
19	A	Rik Taam	Netherlands	o	xo	o	o	xxo	xxx									1.93	740	SB	3305	16
21	A	Sven Roosen	Netherlands	o	o	xxo	xxx											1.87	687		3403	13
	B	Ashley Moloney	Australia															DNS	0		DNF	DNS

=== 400 metres ===
Rank	Heat	Name	Nationality	Time	Points	Notes	Overall points	Overall rank
1	3	Ayden Owens-Delerme	Puerto Rico	46.17	1000	SB	4608	2
2	3	Sven Roosen	Netherlands	46.40	988	PB	4391	9
3	3	Harrison Williams	United States	46.71	973		4432	8
4	2	Sander Skotheim	Norway	47.02	957	PB	4588	3
5	3	Johannes Erm	Estonia	47.19	949		4510	5
6	3	Damian Warner	Canada	47.34	941	SB	4561	4
7	2	Makenson Gletty	France	47.48	934	PB	4381	10
8	2	Markus Rooth	Norway	47.69	924	PB	4459	7
9	2	Leo Neugebauer	Germany	47.70	924	SB	4650	1
10	3	Rik Taam	Netherlands	47.73	922		4227	14
11	2	Lindon Victor	Grenada	47.84	917		4463	6
12	3	Till Steinforth	Germany	47.96	911		4336	12
13	1	Janek Õiglane	Estonia	48.02	908	PB	4225	15
14	2	Jorge Ureña	Spain	48.08	905	SB	4102	18
15	2	Karel Tilga	Estonia	48.67	877	SB	4225	15
16	1	José Fernando Ferreira	Brazil	48.78	872	PB	4148	17
17	2	Heath Baldwin	United States	49.04	859		4366	11
18	1	Niklas Kaul	Germany	49.13	855		4041	20
19	1	Ken Mullings	Bahamas	49.43	841	SB	4255	13
20	1	Daniel Golubovic	Australia	50.37	798		3771	21
21	1	Zachery Ziemek	United States	50.79	779		4071	19

=== 110 metres hurdles ===
Rank	Heat	Athlete	Nation	Time	Points	Notes	Overall points	Overall rank
1	3	Damian Warner	Canada	13.62	1024		5585	1
2	3	Ken Mullings	Bahamas	13.70	1014		5269	12
3	3	Makenson Gletty	France	13.96	980		5361	9
4	3	Sven Roosen	Netherlands	13.99	976		5367	8
5	3	José Fernando Ferreira	Brazil	14.00	975		5123	15
6	3	Heath Baldwin	United States	14.04	969		5335	11
7	3	Ayden Owens-Delerme	Puerto Rico	14.09	963		5571	2
8	2	Sander Skotheim	Norway	14.15	955	SB	5543	4
9	1	Markus Rooth	Norway	14.25	942	SB	5401	6
10	3	Harrison Williams	United States	14.28	939		5371	7
11	2	Jorge Ureña	Spain	14.29	937		5039	18
12	2	Johannes Erm	Estonia	14.35	930		5440	5
13	2	Till Steinforth	Germany	14.37	927		5263	13
14	1	Janek Õiglane	Estonia	14.45	917	SB	5142	14
15	2	Leo Neugebauer	Germany	14.51	910		5560	3
16	2	Niklas Kaul	Germany	14.53	907		4948	19
17	1	Lindon Victor	Grenada	14.62	896	SB	5359	10
18	1	Karel Tilga	Estonia	14.66	891	SB	5116	16
19	1	Rik Taam	Netherlands	14.78	876		5103	17
20	1	Zachery Ziemek	United States	15.11	836		4907	20
21	2	Daniel Golubovic	Australia	15.15	831		4602	21

=== Discus throw ===
Rank	Group	Athlete	Nation	#1	#2	#3	Distance	Points	Notes	Overall points	Overall rank
1	B	Lindon Victor	Grenada	33.85	53.91	X	53.91	952	ODB	6311	4
2	B	Leo Neugebauer	Germany	53.33	48.98	40.20	53.33	940		6500	1
3	A	Karel Tilga	Estonia	46.69	48.28	50.13	50.13	873	SB	5989	13
4	B	Zachery Ziemek	United States	47.70	50.08	X	50.08	872		5779	17
5	B	Markus Rooth	Norway	46.67	47.60	49.80	49.80	866	PB	6267	6
6	B	Damian Warner	Canada	48.51	45.91	48.68	48.68	843	SB	6428	2
7	A	Harrison Williams	United States	44.84	46.33	46.91	46.91	806	SB	6177	8
8	B	Sven Roosen	Netherlands	46.88	45.49	44.18	46.88	806	PB	6173	9
9	A	Johannes Erm	Estonia	44.30	45.34	46.29	46.29	793	SB	6233	7
10	B	Niklas Kaul	Germany	46.28	45.79	43.62	46.28	793		5741	19
11	A	Ken Mullings	Bahamas	46.07	X	X	46.07	789	PB	6058	12
12	A	Makenson Gletty	France	42.71	45.12	46.03	46.03	788	SB	6149	10
13	B	Sander Skotheim	Norway	45.28	44.52	45.77	45.77	783		6326	3
14	B	Daniel Golubovic	Australia	44.65	41.34	42.61	44.65	760		5362	21
15	A	Heath Baldwin	United States	41.24	42.96	43.66	43.66	739		6074	11
16	A	Janek Õiglane	Estonia	38.59	43.39	43.09	43.39	734	SB	5876	15
17	B	Ayden Owens-Delerme	Puerto Rico	33.80	41.08	43.36	43.36	733		6304	5
18	A	José Fernando Ferreira	Brazil	X	X	42.86	42.86	723		5846	16
19	A	Till Steinforth	Germany	41.34	39.16	42.59	42.59	717	SB	5980	14
20	A	Jorge Ureña	Spain	35.34	39.54	40.92	40.92	683		5722	20
21	A	Rik Taam	Netherlands	38.49	39.31	X	39.31	651		5754	18

=== Pole vault ===
Rank	Group	Athlete	Nation	4.20	4.30	4.40	4.50	4.60	4.70	4.80	4.90	5.00	5.10	5.20	5.30	5.40	Height	Points	Notes	Overall points	Overall rank
1	A	Janek Õiglane	Estonia	–	–	–	–	–	–	o	–	o	xo	o	o	r	5.30	1004	PB	6880	11
2	B	Markus Rooth	Norway	–	–	–	–	–	–	o	–	xo	o	o	xo	xxx	5.30	1004	PB	7271	2
3	B	Harrison Williams	United States	–	–	–	–	–	–	–	o	o	xxo	xxx			5.10	941		7118	5
4	B	Zachery Ziemek	United States	–	–	–	–	–	–	–	–	o	–	xxx			5.00	910		6689	15
5	B	Leo Neugebauer	Germany	–	–	–	–	–	xo	o	xo	xo	xxx				5.00	910		7410	1
6	A	Lindon Victor	Grenada	–	–	–	o	o	o	o	xo	xxx					4.90	880	SB	7191	3
7	A	Niklas Kaul	Germany	–	–	–	–	–	xxo	o	xxx						4.80	849		6590	16
8	B	José Fernando Ferreira	Brazil	–	–	–	xo	–	o	xo	xxx						4.80	849		6695	14
9	B	Ayden Owens-Delerme	Puerto Rico	–	–	–	–	o	xo	xo	xxx						4.80	849		7153	4
10	B	Ken Mullings	Bahamas	–	–	–	o	xo	xo	xxo	xxx						4.80	849		6907	9
11	B	Makenson Gletty	France	–	–	–	–	–	o	–	xxx						4.70	819		6968	8
12	A	Sven Roosen	Netherlands	–	–	–	–	xo	o	xxx							4.70	819		6992	7
12	B	Till Steinforth	Germany	–	–	o	o	xo	o	xxx							4.70	819		6799	13
14	A	Karel Tilga	Estonia	–	–		xxo	–	o	–	xr						4.70	819	SB	6808	12
15	A	Heath Baldwin	United States	–	o	–	xo	–	xo	xxx							4.70	819		6893	10
16	A	Rik Taam	Netherlands	–	–	–	–	xo	xo	xxx							4.70	819		6573	17
17	B	Johannes Erm	Estonia	–	–	–	–	xo	–	xxx							4.60	790		7023	6
18	A	Daniel Golubovic	Australia	o	–	xo	o	xxo	xxx								4.60	790	=SB	6152	20
	B	Sander Skotheim	Norway	–	–	–	xxx										NM	0		6326	19
	A	Jorge Ureña	Spain	–	–	xxx											NM	0		5722	21
	A	Damian Warner	Canada	–	–	–	–	xxx									NM	0		6428	18

=== Javelin throw ===
Rank	Group	Athlete	Nation	#1	#2	#3	Distance	Points	Notes	Overall points	Overall rank
1	B	Niklas Kaul	Germany	77.78	r		77.78	1009	ODB	7599	13
2	B	Janek Õiglane	Estonia	71.55	71.89	69.31	71.89	918	SB	7798	4
3	A	José Fernando Ferreira	Brazil	X	70.58	66.36	70.58	898	SB	7593	14
4	B	Lindon Victor	Grenada	63.73	67.02	68.22	68.22	862	SB	8053	3
5	B	Heath Baldwin	United States	61.40	67.59	62.97	67.59	853		7746	8
6	B	Markus Rooth	Norway	66.27	66.87	64.90	66.87	842	PB	8113	1
7	B	Karel Tilga	Estonia	64.16	r		64.16	801	SB	7609	11
8	A	Sven Roosen	Netherlands	63.72	X	-	63.72	794		7786	5
9	A	Ken Mullings	Bahamas	57.62	59.83	X	59.83	735	PB	7642	10
10	A	Sander Skotheim	Norway	59.36	X	59.79	59.79	735		7061	18
11	A	Johannes Erm	Estonia	47.64	54.63	59.58	59.58	732		7755	7
12	A	Daniel Golubovic	Australia	57.08	56.69	59.33	59.33	728		6880	19
13	A	Till Steinforth	Germany	58.65	59.14	X	59.14	725		7524	15
14	A	Jorge Ureña	Spain	57.93	57.91	X	57.93	707	SB	6429	20
15	B	Rik Taam	Netherlands	57.08	X	r	57.08	694	SB	7267	17
16	B	Zachery Ziemek	United States	57.05	56.09	X	57.05	694		7383	16
17	B	Leo Neugebauer	Germany	54.74	56.64	55.38	56.64	687		8097	2
18	A	Makenson Gletty	France	X	51.57	53.02	53.02	633		7601	12
19	A	Ayden Owens-Delerme	Puerto Rico	51.17	51.11	X	51.17	606		7759	6
20	B	Harrison Williams	United States	47.83	51.17	49.38	51.17	606		7724	9
	A	Damian Warner	Canada				DNS			DNF	DNS

=== 1500 metres ===
Rank	Athlete	Nation	Time	Points	Notes	Overall points	Overall rank
1	Niklas Kaul	Germany	4:15.00	846	SB	8445	8
2	Sven Roosen	Netherlands	4:18.55	821	SB	8607	4
3	Harrison Williams	United States	4:19.58	814	PB	8538	7
4	Johannes Erm	Estonia	4:19.71	814	PB	8569	6
5	Rik Taam	Netherlands	4:24.82	779	SB	8046	16
6	Janek Õiglane	Estonia	4:25.59	774	SB	8572	5
7	Karel Tilga	Estonia	4:26.41	768	SB	8377	11
8	Makenson Gletty	France	4:35.58	708		8309	12
9	Sander Skotheim	Norway	4:37.49	696		7757	18
10	Daniel Golubovic	Australia	4:39.02	686		7566	19
11	Markus Rooth	Norway	4:39.56	683	SB	8796	1
12	Ayden Owens-Delerme	Puerto Rico	4:40.39	678	SB	8437	9
13	Heath Baldwin	United States	4:40.67	676		8422	10
14	Jorge Ureña	Spain	4:42.18	667		7096	20
15	Lindon Victor	Grenada	4:43.53	658	SB	8711	3
16	Leo Neugebauer	Germany	4:44.67	651		8748	2
17	Till Steinforth	Germany	4:45.43	646		8170	15
18	José Fernando Ferreira	Brazil	4:49.73	620	SB	8213	14
19	Zachery Ziemek	United States	4:53.17	600	SB	7983	17
20	Ken Mullings	Bahamas	4:55.84	584	SB	8226	13

== Overall results ==
Key

The highest mark recorded in each event is highlighted in yellow.

Key:	OR	Olympic record	AR	Area record	NR	National record	PB	Personal best	SB	Seasonal best	DNS	Did not start	DNF	Did not finish	NM	No Mark

Rank	Athlete	Nation	Overall points	100 m	LJ	SP	HJ	400 m	110 m H	DT	PV	JT	1500 m
1st place, gold medalist(s)	Markus Rooth	Norway	8796 (NR)	926 10.71	1010 7.80	805 15.25	794 1.99	924 47.69	942 14.25	866 49.80	1004 5.30	842 66.87	683 4:39.56
2nd place, silver medalist(s)	Leo Neugebauer	Germany	8748	935 10.67	1056 7.98	885 16.55	850 2.05	924 47.70	910 14.51	940 53.33	910 5.00	687 56.64	651 4:44.67
3rd place, bronze medalist(s)	Lindon Victor	Grenada	8711 (SB)	961 10.56	930 7.48	833 15.71	822 2.02	917 47.84	896 14.62	952 53.91	880 4.90	862 68.22	658 4:43.53
4	Sven Roosen	Netherlands	8607 (NR)	970 10.52	950 7.56	796 15.10	687 1.87	988 46.40	976 13.99	806 46.88	819 4.70	794 63.72	821 4:18.55
5	Janek Õiglane	Estonia	8572 (PB)	885 10.89	874 7.25	764 14.58	794 1.99	908 48.02	917 14.45	734 43.49	1004 5.30	918 71.89	774 4:25.59
6	Johannes Erm	Estonia	8569	942 10.64	975 7.66	766 14.61	878 2.08	949 47.19	930 14.35	793 46.29	790 4.60	732 59.58	814 4:19.71
7	Harrison Williams	United States	8538 (SB)	947 10.62	915 7.42	830 15.66	767 1.96	973 46.71	939 14.28	806 46.91	941 5.10	606 51.17	814 4:19.58
8	Niklas Kaul	Germany	8445	786 11.34	835 7.09	743 14.24	822 2.02	855 49.13	907 14.53	793 46.28	849 4.80	1009 77.78	846 4:15.00
9	Ayden Owens-Delerme	Puerto Rico	8437	1011 10.35	975 7.66	800 15.17	822 2.02	1000 46.17	963 14.09	733 43.36	849 4.80	606 51.17	678 4:40.39
10	Heath Baldwin	United States	8422	881 10.91	905 7.38	758 14.48	963 2.17	859 49.04	969 14.04	739 43.66	819 4.70	853 67.59	676 4:40.67
11	Karel Tilga	Estonia	8377 (SB)	858 11.01	852 7.16	844 15.88	794 1.99	877 48.67	891 14.66	873 50.13	819 4.70	801 64.16	768 4:26.41
12	Makenson Gletty	France	8309	924 10.72	838 7.10	891 16.64	794 1.99	934 47.48	980 13.96	788 46.03	819 4.70	633 53.02	708 4:35.58
13	Ken Mullings	Bahamas	8226 (NR)	952 10.60	900 7.36	740 14.19	822 2.02	841 49.43	1014 13.70	789 46.07	849 4.80	735 59.83	584 4:55.84
14	José Fernando Santana	Brazil	8213 (PB)	938 10.66	871 7.24	727 13.97	740 1.93	872 48.78	975 14.00	723 42.86	849 4.80	898 70.58	620 4:49.73
15	Till Steinforth	Germany	8170	970 10.52	962 7.61	726 13.96	767 1.96	911 47.96	927 14.37	717 42.59	819 4.70	725 59.14	646 4:45.43
16	Rik Taam	Netherlands	8046 (SB)	942 10.64	878 7.27	745 14.27	740 1.93	922 47.73	876 14.78	651 39.31	819 4.70	694 57.08	779 4:24.82
17	Zachery Ziemek	United States	7983	952 10.60	781 6.86	792 15.03	767 1.96	779 50.79	836 15.11	872 50.08	910 5.00	694 57.05	600 4:53.17
18	Sander Skotheim	Norway	7757	910 10.78	1068 8.03	747 14.31	906 2.11	957 47.02	955 14.15	783 45.77	0 NM	735 59.79	696 4:37.49
19	Daniel Golubovic	Australia	7566	791 11.32	720 6.60	722 13.89	740 1.93	798 50.37	831 15.15	760 44.65	790 4.60	728 59.33	686 4:39.02
20	Jorge Ureña	Spain	7096	890 10.87	826 7.05	714 13.77	767 1.96	905 48.08	937 14.29	683 40.92	0 NM	707 57.93	667 4:42.18
—N/a	Damian Warner	Canada	DNF	1035 10.25	1010 7.80	756 14.45	822 2.02	941 47.34	1024 13.62	843 48.68	0 NM	DNS	
—N/a	Ashley Moloney	Australia	DNF	961 10.56	826 7.05	692 13.40	DNS	DNS	DNS	DNS	DNS	DNS	DNS
