= Vital Zhuk =

Belarusian decathlete

Vitaliy Zhuk
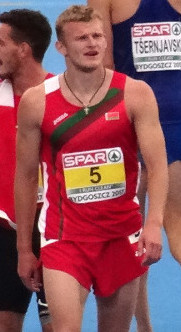
- Vitaliy Zhuk in 2017

Personal information
- Full name: Vitaliy Mikhailavich Zhuk
- Born: 10 September 1996 (age 29)
- Education: Sport and Tourism Ministry

Sport
- Sport: Athletics
- Event: Decathlon

Vitaliy Mikhailavich Zhuk (Belarusian: Віталій Міхайлавіч Жук; born 10 September 1996) is a Belarusian athlete competing in the combined events. He won a bronze medal in the decathlon at the 2018 European Championships.

== International competitions ==
Year	Competition	Venue	Position	Event	Notes
Representing Belarus
2015	European Junior Championships	Eskilstuna, Sweden	8th	Decathlon (junior)	7315 pts
2017	European U23 Championships	Bydgoszcz, Poland	4th	Decathlon	7921 pts
2018	European Championships	Berlin, Germany	3rd	Decathlon	8290 pts
2019	European Indoor Championships	Glasgow, United Kingdom	8th	Heptathlon	5689 pts
2019	World Championships	Doha, Qatar	13th	Decathlon	8058 pts
2021	Olympic Games	Tokyo, Japan	13th	Decathlon	8131 pts

== Personal bests ==
Outdoor

- 100 metres – 10.94 (+0.7 m/s, Götzis 2019)
- 400 metres – 47.81 (Talence 2019)
- 1500 metres – 4:30.36 (Götzis 2018)
- 110 metres hurdles – 14.48 (+1.7 m/s, Bydgoszcz 2017)
- High jump – 2.00 (Grodno 2016)
- Pole vault – 4.90 (Berlin 2018)
- Long jump – 7.11 (+0.5 m/s, Götzis 2018)
- Shot put – 15.66 (Lutsk 2019)
- Discus throw – 48.64 (Lutsk 2019)
- Javelin throw – 66.19 (Berlin 2018)
- Decathlon – 8290 (Berlin 2018)

Indoor

- 60 metres – 7.13 (Glasgow 2019)
- 1000 metres – 2:46.94 (Gomel 2016)
- 60 metres hurdles – 8.20 (Mogilyov 2018)
- High jump – 2.05 (Mogilyov 2019)
- Pole vault – 4.80 (Glasgow 2019)
- Long jump – 6.97 (Gomel 2018)
- Shot put – 16.32 (Glasgow 2019)
- Heptathlon – 5705 (Mogilyov 2019)
