= Jorge Ureña =

Spanish decathlete

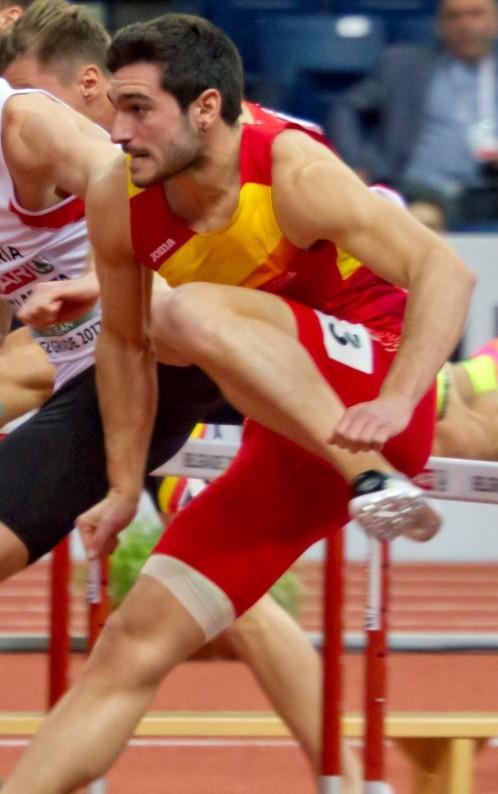
- Jorge Ureña in 2017

Personal information
- Full name: Jorge Ureña Andreu
- Born: 8 October 1993 (age 32) Onil, Spain
- Height: 179 cm (5 ft 10 in)
- Weight: 80 kg (176 lb)

Sport
- Sport: Track and field
- Event(s): Decathlon, Heptathlon
- Club: Centre Esportiu Colivenc
- Coached by: Jesús Gil

Achievements and titles
- Personal bests: Decathlon: 8,381 (2023); Hepthalon: 6,249 (2017) NR
Medal record
Men's athletics
Representing Spain
European Indoor Championships
| Gold medal – first place | 2019 Glasgow | Heptathlon |
| Silver medal – second place | 2017 Belgrade | Heptathlon |
| Silver medal – second place | 2021 Toruń | Heptathlon |

Jorge Ureña Andreu (born 8 October 1993 in Onil) is a Spanish athlete competing in the combined events. He won the silver medal at the 2015 European U23 Championships. In addition, he finished seventh at the 2015 European Indoor Championships.

== Competition record ==
| Year | Competition | Venue | Position | Event | Notes |
Representing Spain
| 2012 | World Junior Championships | Barcelona, Spain | 20th | Decathlon (junior) | 6937 pts |
| 2014 | Ibero-American Championships | São Paulo, Brazil | 2nd | Decathlon | 7644 pts |
| 2015 | European Indoor Championships | Prague, Czech Republic | 7th | Heptathlon | 5941 pts |
| 2015 | European U23 Championships | Tallinn, Estonia | 2nd | Decathlon | 7983 pts |
| 2015 | World Championships | Beijing, China | 21st | Decathlon | 6858 pts |
| 2016 | World Indoor Championships | Portland, United States | – | Heptathlon | DNF |
| 2016 | European Championships | Amsterdam, Netherlands | – | Decathlon | DNF |
| 2017 | European Indoor Championships | Belgrade, Serbia | 2nd | Heptathlon | 6227 pts |
| 2017 | World Championships | London, United Kingdom | 9th | Decathlon | 8125 pts |
| 2018 | European Championships | Berlin, Germany | 16th | Decathlon | 7208 pts |
| 2019 | European Indoor Championships | Glasgow, United Kingdom | 1st | Heptathlon | 6218 pts |
| 2021 | European Indoor Championships | Toruń, Poland | 2nd | Heptathlon | 6158 pts |
| 2021 | Olympic Games | Tokyo, Japan | 9th | Decathlon | 8322 pts |
| 2022 | World Indoor Championships | Belgrade, Serbia | 7th | Heptathlon | 6049 pts |
| 2023 | European Indoor Championships | Istanbul, Turkey | 5th | Heptathlon | 5966 pts |
| 2024 | Olympic Games | Paris, France | 20th | Decathlon | 7096 pts |

== Personal bests ==
Information from World Athletics profile unless otherwise noted.

As of June 18, 2025

| Event | Performance | Location | Date | Points |
|---|---|---|---|---|
| Decathlon | —N/a | Ratingen | June 17–18, 2023 | 8,381 points |
| 100 meters | 10.66 (+0.8 m/s) | Tokyo | August 4, 2021 | 938 points |
| Long jump | 7.69 m (25 ft 2 3/4 in) (+1.2 m/s) | Torrent | July 30, 2023 | 982 points |
| Shot put | 14.42 m (47 ft 3 1/2 in) | La Nucia | June 26, 2024 | 754 points |
| High jump | 2.09 m (6 ft 10 1/4 in) | La Nucia | August 31, 2019 | 887 points |
| 400 meters | 48.00 | Tokyo | August 4, 2021 | 909 points |
| 110 meters hurdles | 13.88 (+0.7 m/s) | Lutsk | July 7, 2019 | 990 points |
| Discus throw | 43.70 m (143 ft 4 1/4 in) | Tokyo | August 5, 2021 | 740 points |
| Pole vault | 5.10 m (16 ft 8 3/4 in) | Soria | August 4, 2019 | 941 points |
| Javelin throw | 64.02 m (210 ft 1/4 in) | Arona | June 7, 2015 | 799 points |
| 1500 meters | 4:24.02 | Ratingen | June 18, 2023 | 784 points |
| Virtual Best Performance | | | | 8,724 points |

=== Indoor ===
As of June 18, 2025

| Event | Performance | Location | Date | Points |
|---|---|---|---|---|
| Heptathlon | —N/a | Prague | January 28–29, 2017 | 6,249 points |
| 60 meters | 6.79 | Gallur | February 17, 2023 | 958 points |
| Long jump | 7.73 m (25 ft 4 1/4 in) | Antequera | February 16, 2019 | 992 points |
| Shot put | 14.84 m (48 ft 8 1/4 in) | Valencia | December 18, 2021 | 780 points |
| High jump | 2.11 m (6 ft 11 in) | Ourense | February 29, 2020 | 906 points |
| 60 meters hurdles | 7.78 | Belgrade | March 5, 2017 | 1,038 points |
| Pole vault | 5.05 m (16 ft 6 3/4 in) | Ourense | February 26, 2022 | 926 points |
| 1000 meters | 2:40.06 | Antequera | February 22, 2015 | 873 points |
| Virtual Best Performance | | | | 6,473 points |
