= 2015 European Athletics U23 Championships – Men's decathlon =

The men's decathlon event at the 2015 European Athletics U23 Championships was held in Tallinn, Estonia, at Kadriorg Stadium on 11 and 12 July.

== Medalists ==
Gold	Pieter Braun; Netherlands
Silver	Jorge Ureña; Spain
Bronze	Janek Õiglane; Estonia

== Results ==
=== Final ===
11/12 July

The highest mark recorded in each event is highlighted in yellow

Rank	Name	Nationality	100m	LJ	SP	HJ	400m	110m H	DT	PV	JT	1500m	Points	Notes
1st place, gold medalist(s)	Pieter Braun	Netherlands	11.04 (w: 0.7 m/s)	7.38 (w: 1.6 m/s)	14.19	2.01	48.02	14.13 (w: 0.7 m/s)	42.69	4.90	58.55	4:36.19	8195	
2nd place, silver medalist(s)	Jorge Ureña	Spain	10.94 (w: 1.9 m/s)	7.47 (w: 1.5 m/s)	13.43	2.04	49.26	14.13 (w: 0.7 m/s)	36.93	4.60	60.87	4:36.97	7983	PB
3rd place, bronze medalist(s)	Janek Õiglane	Estonia	11.32 (w: 0.3 m/s)	7.23 (w: 0.5 m/s)	14.88	2.04	51.14	14.67 (w: 0.7 m/s)	40.70	4.50	69.15	4:37.75	7945	PB
4	Aleksey Kravtsov	Russia	10.94 (w: 0.7 m/s)	7.52 (w: 0.9 m/s)	14.31	2.01	48.30	14.35 (w: 0.7 m/s)	33.51	4.60	54.21	4:35.13	7885	
5	Fredrik Samuelsson	Sweden	10.98 (w: 1.9 m/s)	7.81 (w: 0.8 m/s)	13.48	2.04	50.32	14.65 (w: 0.6 m/s)	37.68	4.70	55.33	4:41.23	7884	PB
6	Yevgeniy Likhanov	Russia	11.14 (w: 1.9 m/s)	7.63w (w: 3.2 m/s)	13.94	2.07	50.48	14.80 (w: 0.6 m/s)	43.81	4.70	51.50	4:57.10	7806	
7	Elmo Savola	Finland	10.96 (w: 0.3 m/s)	7.27 (w: 1.6 m/s)	13.45	1.98	49.84	14.51 (w: 0.6 m/s)	37.37	4.50	62.96	4:48.17	7743	PB
8	Basile Rolnin	France	11.17 (w: 0.3 m/s)	7.23 (w: 1.3 m/s)	13.52	1.86	50.74	14.68 (w: 0.7 m/s)	42.85	4.90	58.10	4:48.65	7679	PB
9	Juuso Hassi	Finland	10.97 (w: 0.7 m/s)	7.08 (w: 0.7 m/s)	13.54	1.89	49.27	14.95 (w: 0.6 m/s)	40.45	4.50	59.35	4:45.03	7621	PB
10	Markus Leemet	Estonia	10.99 (w: 0.7 m/s)	7.11w (w: 2.8 m/s)	12.76	1.92	48.86	15.16 (w: 0.6 m/s)	31.34	4.10	51.71	4:47.03	7172	
11	Jan Deuber	Switzerland	11.25 (w: 1.9 m/s)	6.77 (w: 1.4 m/s)	11.44	1.92	51.32	15.10 (w: 0.7 m/s)	35.47	4.00	49.28	4:56.40	6810	
	Tim Nowak	Germany	11.11 (w: 0.3 m/s)	7.07 (w: 1.3 m/s)	14.46	2.01	49.51	14.49 (w: 0.7 m/s)	NM				DNF	
	Kristjan Rosenberg	Estonia	11.10 (w: 0.7 m/s)	7.16 (w: 1.2 m/s)	13.52	2.01	50.86						DNF	
	Jiří Sýkora	Czech Republic	10.99 (w: 1.9 m/s)	7.57 (w: 0.5 m/s)	13.94	NH							DNF	
	Ruben Gado	France	10.83 (w: 0.7 m/s)	NM	11.69	1.86							DNF	
	Dino Dodig	Serbia	11.17 (w: 1.9 m/s)	NM									DNF	
	Ionel Irinel Cojan	Romania	11.52 (w: 0.3 m/s)										DNF	

== Participation ==
According to an unofficial count, 17 athletes from 12 countries participated in the event.

- Czech Republic (1)
- Estonia (3)
- Finland (2)
- France (2)
- Germany (1)
- Netherlands (1)
- Romania (1)
- Russia (2)
- Serbia (1)
- Spain (1)
- Sweden (1)
- Switzerland (1)
