= 2019 European Athletics Indoor Championships – Men's heptathlon =

The men's heptathlon event at the 2019 European Athletics Indoor Championships was held on 2 and 3 March.

== Medalists ==
Gold	Silver	Bronze
Jorge Ureña; Spain	Tim Duckworth; Great Britain	Ilya Shkurenyov; Authorised Neutral Athletes

== Records ==
Standing records prior to the 2019 European Athletics Indoor Championships
World record	Ashton Eaton (USA)	6645	Istanbul, Turkey	10 March 2012
European record	Kevin Mayer (FRA)	6479	Belgrade, Serbia	5 March 2017
Championship record	Kevin Mayer (FRA)	6479	Belgrade, Serbia	5 March 2017
World Leading	Thomas van der Plaetsen (BEL)	6132	Ghent, Belgium	3 February 2019
European Leading	Thomas van der Plaetsen (BEL)	6132	Ghent, Belgium	3 February 2019

== Results ==
=== 60 metres ===
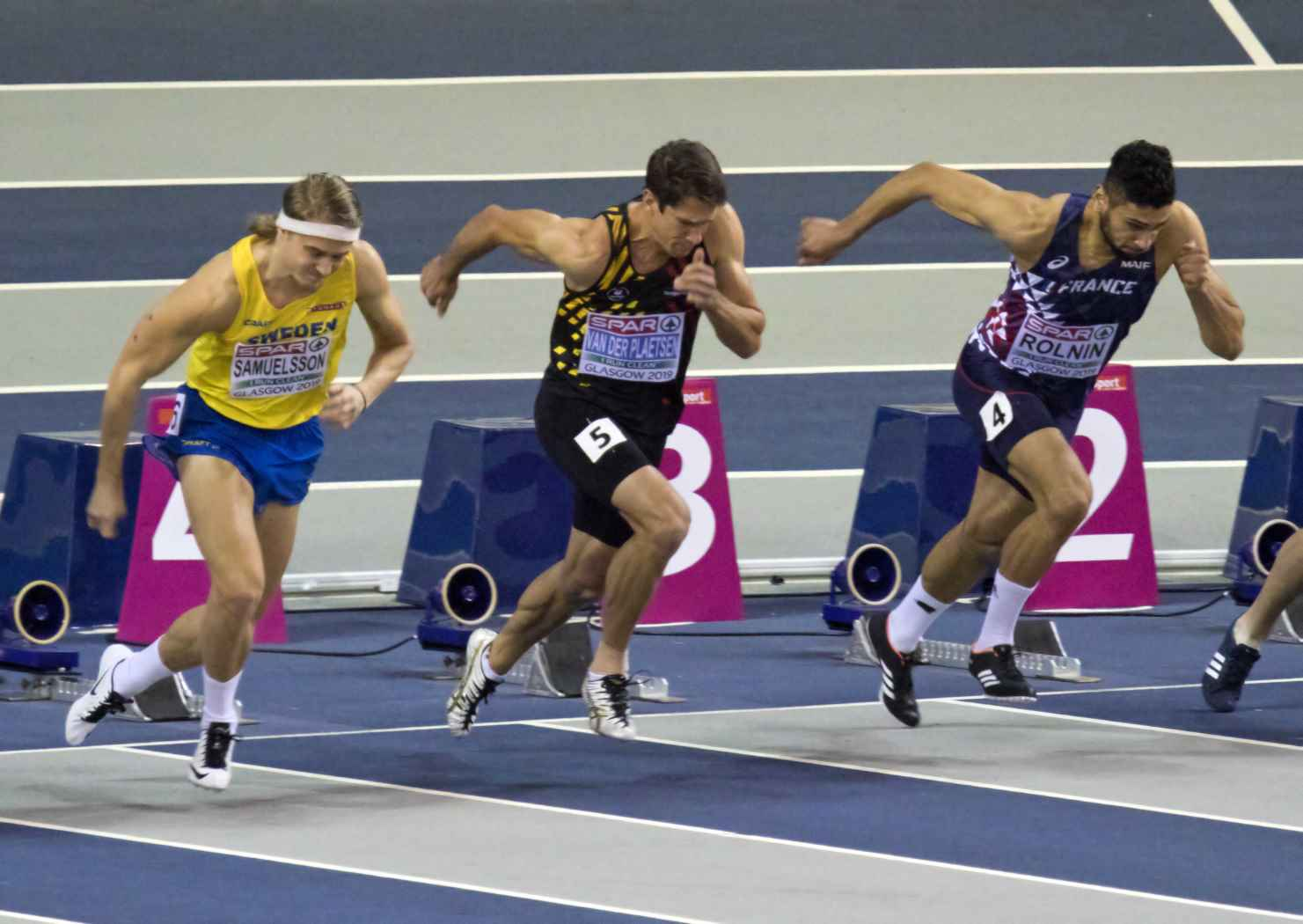
Heat 1

Rank	Heat	Lane	Athlete	Nationality	Time	Notes	Points
1	2	4	Karl Robert Saluri	Estonia	6.75	CB	973
2	2	7	Tim Duckworth	Great Britain	6.85		936
3	2	5	Jorge Ureña	Spain	6.96	SB	897
4	2	3	Martin Roe	Norway	7.03		872
5	1	3	Andreas Bechmann	Germany	7.05	PB	865
6	1	6	Fredrik Samuelsson	Sweden	7.06		861
7	2	6	Jiří Sýkora	Czech Republic	7.08		854
8	1	4	Basile Rolnin	France	7.13		837
8	1	7	Vital Zhuk	Belarus	7.13	PB	837
10	1	8	Janek Õiglane	Estonia	7.15		830
11	2	8	Ilya Shkurenyov	Authorised Neutral Athletes	7.18		819
12	1	5	Thomas Van der Plaetsen	Belgium	7.35		762

=== Long jump ===
Rank	Athlete	Nationality	#1	#2	#3	Result	Notes	Points	Total
1	Tim Duckworth	Great Britain	7.79	x	7.74	7.79	SB	1007	1947
2	Fredrik Samuelsson	Sweden	7.39	7.43	7.66	7.66	PB	975	1836
2	Ilya Shkurenyov	Authorised Neutral Athletes	7.39	7.43	7.66	7.66		975	1794
4	Thomas Van der Plaetsen	Belgium	7.57	7.45	7.42	7.57		952	1714
5	Martin Roe	Norway	7.53	7.49	7.53	7.53		942	1814
6	Karl Robert Saluri	Estonia	7.49	x	7.48	7.49		932	1905
7	Basile Rolnin	France	7.44	7.38	7.13	7.44		920	1757
8	Jorge Ureña	Spain	7.29	7.11	7.39	7.39		908	1805
9	Andreas Bechmann	Germany	7.11	7.23	7.39	7.39	SB	908	1773
10	Jiří Sýkora	Czech Republic	7.36	x	x	7.36		900	1754
11	Janek Õiglane	Estonia	7.14	7.23	6.89	7.23		869	1699
12	Vital Zhuk	Belarus	x	x	6.55	6.55		709	1546

=== Shot put ===
Rank	Athlete	Nationality	#1	#2	#3	Result	Notes	Points	Total
1	Vital Zhuk	Belarus	16.32	15.26	15.81	16.32	PB	871	2417
2	Martin Roe	Norway	15.59	15.60	15.53	15.60		827	2641
3	Janek Õiglane	Estonia	14.99	15.50	x	15.50	PB	820	2519
4	Basile Rolnin	France	13.30	14.56	15.17	15.17	PB	800	2557
5	Jiří Sýkora	Czech Republic	14.60	15.09	15.05	15.09	PB	795	2549
6	Fredrik Samuelsson	Sweden	12.35	13.92	14.69	14.69	PB	771	2607
7	Jorge Ureña	Spain	x	x	14.68	14.68	PB	770	2575
8	Ilya Shkurenyov	Authorised Neutral Athletes	13.55	13.61	14.30	14.30		747	2541
9	Andreas Bechmann	Germany	13.55	14.04	x	14.04		731	2504
10	Karl Robert Saluri	Estonia	x	13.84	x	13.84		719	2624
11	Thomas Van der Plaetsen	Belgium	13.76	13.66	13.36	13.76		714	2428
12	Tim Duckworth	Great Britain	11.72	12.89	12.97	12.97		665	2608

=== High jump ===
Rank	Group	Athlete	Nationality	1.80	1.83	1.86	1.89	1.92	1.95	1.98	2.01	2.04	2.07	2.10	2.13	2.16	Result	Notes	Points	Total
1	A	Tim Duckworth	Great Britain	–	–	–	–	–	–	–	xo	o	o	o	o	xxx	2.13		925	3533
2	A	Thomas Van der Plaetsen	Belgium	–	–	–	–	–	–	o	–	xo	o	o	xxx		2.10	SB	896	3324
3	B	Andreas Bechmann	Germany	–	–	–	o	o	o	xo	o	o	xo	xxx			2.07	PB	868	3372
4	B	Fredrik Samuelsson	Sweden	–	–	–	–	o	–	o	o	o	xxo	xxx			2.07	SB	868	3475
5	A	Jorge Ureña	Spain	–	–	o	–	–	o	–	xo	o	xxo	xxx			2.07	SB	868	3443
6	A	Ilya Shkurenyov	Authorised Neutral Athletes	–	–	–	–	–	o	–	o	o	xxx				2.04		840	3381
7	A	Basile Rolnin	France	–	–	–	–	o	xo	xo	xxo	xxo	xxr				2.04		840	3397
8	A	Janek Õiglane	Estonia	–	–	–	–	o	–	o	xo	xxx					2.01	SB	813	3332
9	B	Vital Zhuk	Belarus	–	–	o	xo	o	xo	xxo	xxx						1.98		785	3202
10	B	Jiří Sýkora	Czech Republic	–	–	–	–	o	–	xxx							1.92		731	3280
11	B	Martin Roe	Norway	–	o	o	xo	o	xxx								1.92		731	3372
	B	Karl Robert Saluri	Estonia														DNS			

=== 60 metres hurdles ===
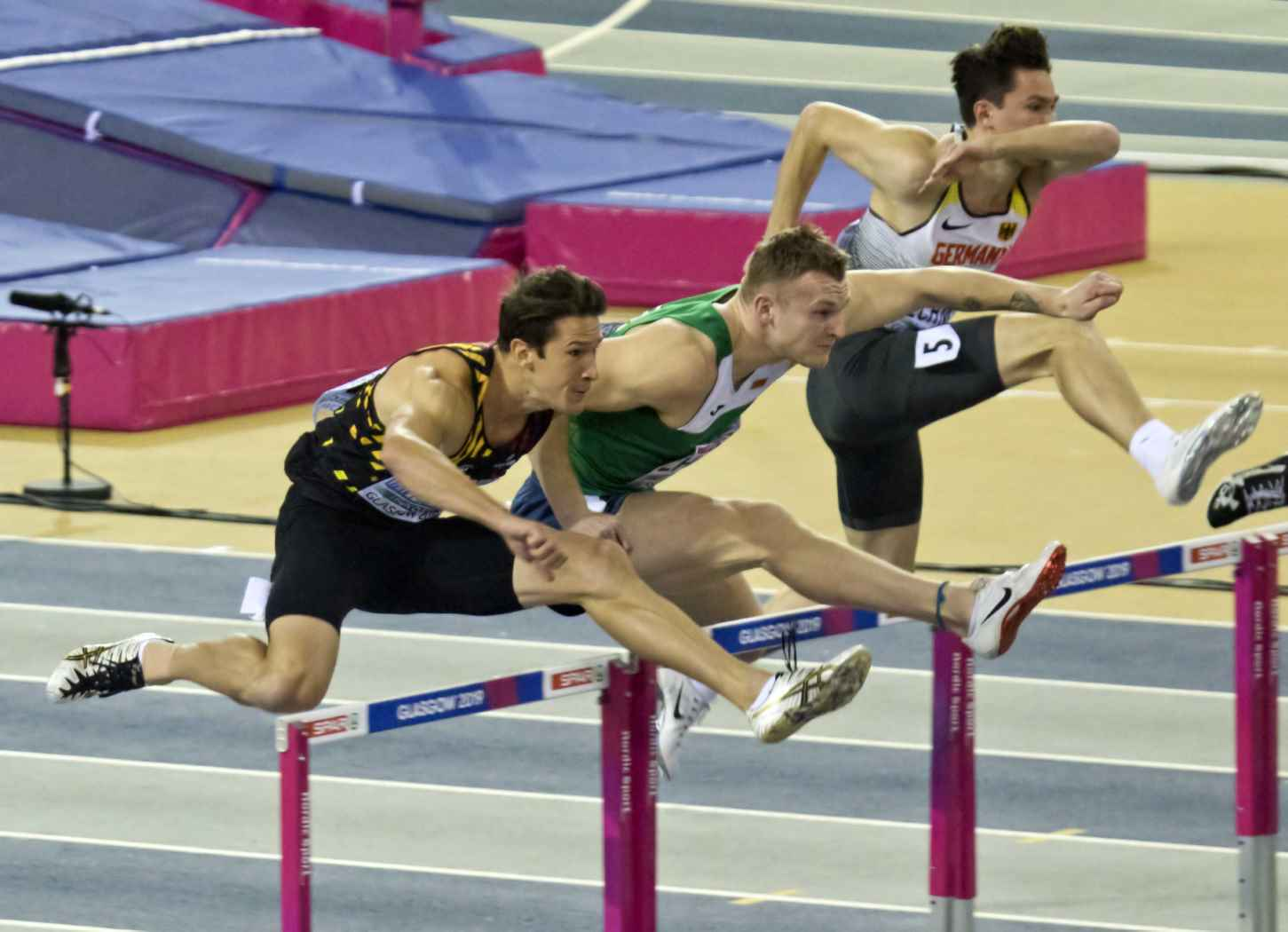
Heat 1

Rank	Heat	Lane	Athlete	Nationality	Result	Notes	Points	Total
1	2	3	Jorge Ureña	Spain	7.78	PB	1038	4481
2	2	7	Jiří Sýkora	Czech Republic	8.02		977	4257
2	1	6	Ilya Shkurenyov	Authorised Neutral Athletes	8.02		977	4358
4	2	4	Tim Duckworth	Great Britain	8.16		942	4475
5	2	5	Janek Õiglane	Estonia	8.18		937	4269
6	2	6	Fredrik Samuelsson	Sweden	8.20		932	4407
7	1	8	Thomas Van der Plaetsen	Belgium	8.29		910	4234
8	1	4	Martin Roe	Norway	8.36	PB	893	4265
9	1	5	Andreas Bechmann	Germany	8.55		848	4220
10	1	7	Vital Zhuk	Belarus	8.57		843	4045
	2	8	Basile Rolnin	France	DNS			

=== Pole vault ===
Rank	Athlete	Nationality	4.40	4.50	4.60	4.70	4.80	4.90	5.00	5.10	5.20	5.30	5.40	Result	Notes	Points	Total
1	Ilya Shkurenyov	Authorised Neutral Athletes	–	–	–	–	o	–	o	o	o	xxx		5.20		972	5330
2	Andreas Bechmann	Germany	–	–	–	o	o	o	xo	xxo	o	xxx		5.20	PB	972	5192
3	Thomas Van der Plaetsen	Belgium	–	–	–	–	–	–	o	–	xxo	–	xxx	5.20		972	5206
4	Fredrik Samuelsson	Sweden	–	o	–	o	o	o	o	xxx				5.00	PB	910	5317
5	Tim Duckworth	Great Britain	–	–	o	o	xo	xo	o	xxx				5.00		910	5385
6	Jorge Ureña	Spain	–	–	o	–	o	xo	xxo	xxx				5.00	SB	910	5391
7	Martin Roe	Norway	–	o	o	o	xo	o	xxx					4.90	PB	880	5145
8	Janek Õiglane	Estonia	–	–	–	–	o	–	xr					4.80		849	5118
9	Vital Zhuk	Belarus	–	–	o	xo	xo	xxx						4.80	PB	849	4894
	Jiří Sýkora	Czech Republic	xr											NM		0	0

=== 1000 metres ===
Rank	Athlete	Nationality	Result	Notes	Points
1	Jorge Ureña	Spain	2:44.27		827
2	Ilya Shkurenyov	Authorised Neutral Athletes	2:45.35		815
3	Andreas Bechmann	Germany	2:45.86		809
4	Fredrik Samuelsson	Sweden	2:45.99		808
5	Martin Roe	Norway	2:46.17	PB	806
6	Vital Zhuk	Belarus	2:47.18	SB	795
7	Thomas Van der Plaetsen	Belgium	2:48.30		783
8	Tim Duckworth	Great Britain	2:49.44	PB	771
9	Jiří Sýkora	Czech Republic	2:50.58		759
	Janek Õiglane	Estonia	DNS		0

=== Final results ===
The highest mark recorded in each event is highlighted in yellow

Rank	Athlete	Nationality	60m	LJ	SP	HJ	60m H	PV	1000m	Points	Notes
1st place, gold medalist(s)	Jorge Ureña	Spain	6.96	7.39	14.68	2.07	7.78	5.00	2:44.27	6218	WL
2nd place, silver medalist(s)	Tim Duckworth	Great Britain	6.85	7.79	12.97	2.13	8.16	5.00	2:49.44	6156	
3rd place, bronze medalist(s)	Ilya Shkurenyov	Authorised Neutral Athletes	7.18	7.66	14.30	2.04	8.02	5.20	2:45.36	6145	
4	Fredrik Samuelsson	Sweden	7.06	7.66	14.69	2.07	8.20	5.00	2:45.99	6125	PB
5	Andreas Bechmann	Germany	7.05	7.39	14.04	2.07	8.55	5.20	2:45.86	6001	
6	Thomas Van der Plaetsen	Belgium	7.35	7.57	13.76	2.10	8.29	5.20	2:48.30	5989	
7	Martin Roe	Norway	7.03	7.53	15.60	1.92	8.36	4.90	2:46.17	5951	NR
8	Vital Zhuk	Belarus	7.13	6.55	16.32	1.98	8.57	4.80	2:47.18	5689	
9	Jiří Sýkora	Czech Republic	7.08	7.36	15.09	1.92	8.02	NM	2:50.58	5016	
	Janek Õiglane	Estonia	7.15	7.23	15.50	2.01	8.18	4.80	DNS	DNF	
	Basile Rolnin	France	7.13	7.44	15.17	2.04	DNS	–	–	DNF	
	Karl Robert Saluri	Estonia	6.75	7.49	13.84	DNS	–	–	–	DNF	
