= Rik Taam =

Dutch decathlete

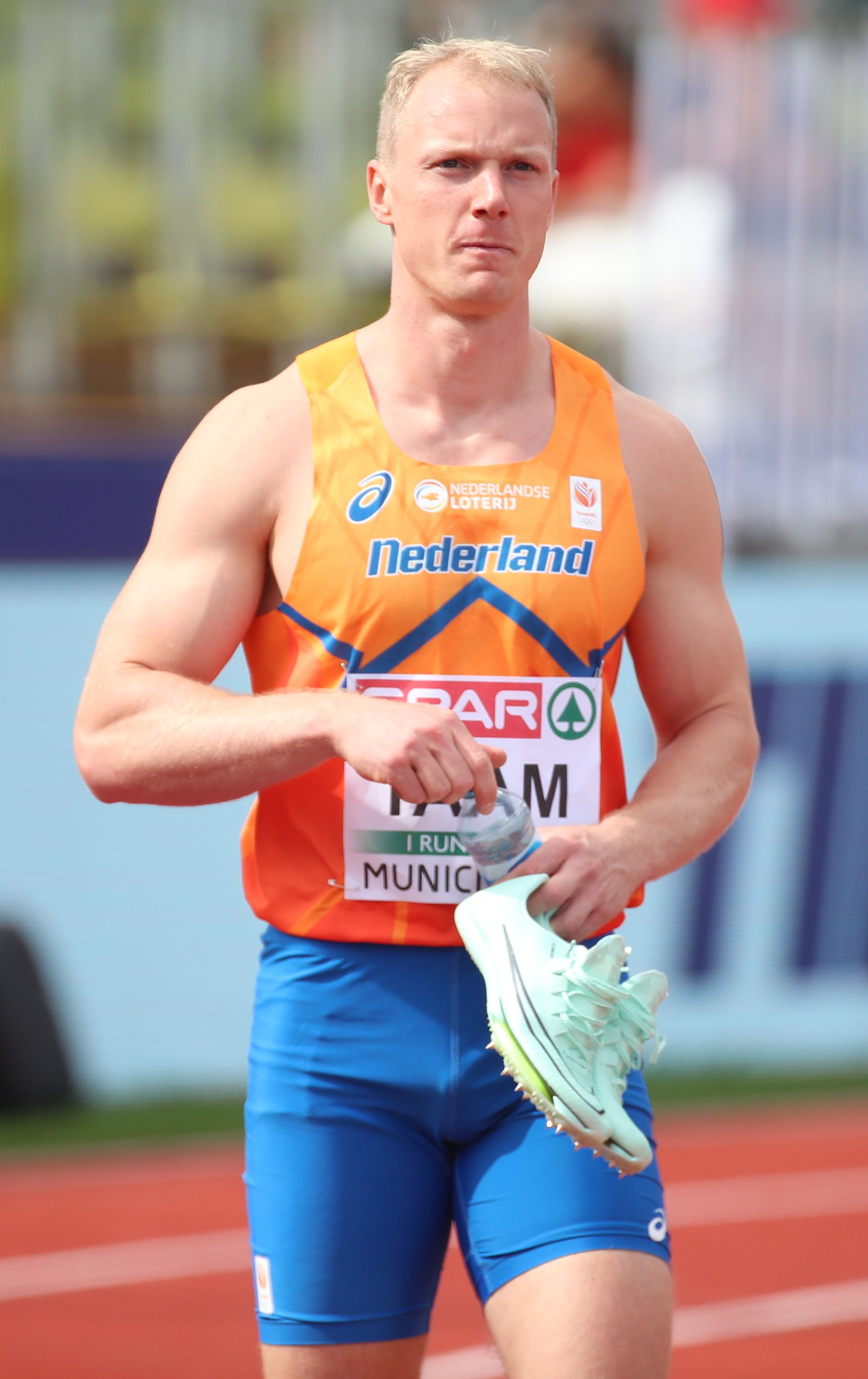
- Taam in 2022

Personal information
- Born: 17 January 1997 (age 29)
- Height: 1.86 m (6 ft 1 in)
- Weight: 82 kg (181 lb)

Sport
- Sport: Athletics
- Event: Decathlon
- Club: Av Zaanland
- Coached by: Ronald Vetter

Rik Taam (Dutch: [rɪk ˈtaːm]; born 17 January 1997) is a Dutch athlete competing in the combined events. He represented his country at the 2021 European Indoor Championships narrowly missing out on a medal.

== International competitions ==
Year	Competition	Venue	Position	Event	Notes
Representing the Netherlands
2016	World U20 Championships	Bydgoszcz, Poland	7th	Decathlon (U20)	7699 pts
2019	European U23 Championships	Gävle, Sweden	13th	Decathlon	6939 pts
2021	European Indoor Championships	Toruń, Poland	4th	Heptathlon	6111 pts
2022	European Championships	Munich, Germany	–	Decathlon	DNF
2023	World Championships	Budapest, Hungary	13th	Decathlon	8098 pts
2024	Olympic Games	Paris, France	16th	Decathlon	8046 pts

== Personal bests ==
Outdoor

- 100 metres – 10.63 (+1.9 m/s) (Götzis 2021)
- 400 metres – 47.12 (Budapest 2023)
- 1500 metres – 4:26.53 (Emmeloord 2020)
- 110 metres hurdles – 14.51 (+1.8 m/s) (Götzis 2021)
- High jump – 2.09 (Amstelveen 2018)
- Pole vault – 5.10 (Götzis 2021)
- Long jump – 7.30 (+0.5 m/s, (Götzis 2021)
- Shot put – 14.89 (Boedapest 2023)
- Discus throw – 47.64 (Breda 2021)
- Javelin throw – 58.87 (Gävle 2019)
- Decathlon – 8107 (Breda 2021)
Indoor
- 60 metres – 6.92 (Apeldoorn 2017)
- 1000 metres – 2:35.31 (Apeldoorn 2021)
- 60 metres hurdles – 8.01 (Amsterdam 2020)
- High jump – 2.04 (Toruń 2021)
- Pole vault – 4.83 (Aubiére 2021)
- Long jump – 7.30 (Apeldoorn 2019)
- Shot put – 14.84 (Apeldoorn 2020)
- Heptathlon – 6111 (Toruń 2021)
