= Maksim Andraloits =

Belarusian decathlete

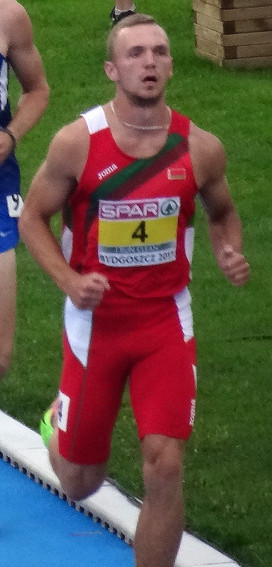
- Maksim Andraloits in 2017

Personal information
- Born: 17 June 1997 (age 29)
- Education: Hrodna State University
- Height: 1.91 m (6 ft 3 in)
- Weight: 90 kg (198 lb)

Sport
- Sport: Athletics
- Event: Decathlon

Maksim Hienadzievich Andraloits (Belarusian: Максім Генадзевіч Андралойць; born 17 June 1997) is a Belarusian decathlete. He won a silver medal at the 2016 World U20 Championships and a bronze at the 2015 European Junior Championships.

== Competition record ==
Year	Competition	Venue	Position	Event	Notes
Representing Belarus
2013	World Youth Championships	Donetsk, Ukraine	4th	Octathlon	6157 pts
2015	European Junior Championships	Eskilstuna, Sweden	3rd	Decathlon (junior)	7717 pts
2016	World U20 Championships	Bydgoszcz, Poland	2nd	Decathlon (junior)	8046 pts
2017	European U23 Championships	Bydgoszcz, Poland	5th	Decathlon	7858 pts
2017	Universiade	Taipei, Taiwan	4th	Decathlon	7472 pts
2018	European Championships	Berlin, Germany	–	Decathlon	DNF
2021	European Indoor Championships	Toruń, Poland	–	Heptathlon	DNF

== Personal bests ==
Outdoor

- 100 metres – 10.92 (-0.9 m/s, Florence 2018)
- 400 metres – 48.56 (Berlin 2018)
- 1500 metres – 4:43.65 (Bydgoszcz 2016)
- 110 metres hurdles – 14.47 (+1.5 m/s, Bydgoszcz 2017)
- High jump – 2.04 (Bydgoszcz 2016)
- Pole vault – 5.00 (Minsk 2018)
- Long jump – 7.37 (+1.4 m/s, Brest 2018)
- Shot put – 15.33 (Berlin 2018)
- Discus throw – 44.41 (Florence 2017)
- Javelin throw – 52.40 (Tallinn 2017)
- Decathlon – 7863 (Florence 2018)

Indoor

- 60 metres – 7.09 (Gomel 2018)
- 1000 metres – 2:52.13 (Minsk 2016)
- 60 metres hurdles – 8.10 (Mogilyov 2015)
- High jump – 2.07 (Gomel 2018)
- Pole vault – 4.40 (Minsk 2016)
- Long jump – 7.24 (Mogilyov 2016)
- Shot put – 14.37 (Gomel 2018)
