= Andreas Bechmann =

German decathlete

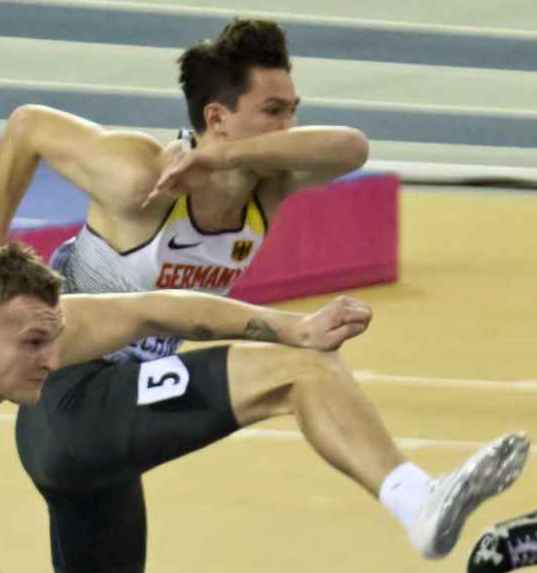
- Andreas Bechmann in 2019

Personal information
- Born: 28 September 1999 (age 26) Frankfurt, Germany
- Height: 1.98 m (6 ft 6 in)
- Weight: 88 kg (194 lb)

Sport
- Sport: Athletics
- Event: Decathlon
- Club: LG Eintracht Frankfurt
- Coached by: Jürgen Sammert; Nastja Steinbeck

Andreas Bechmann (born 28 September 1999 in Frankfurt) is a German athlete competing in the combined events. He represented his country at two editions of the European Indoor Championships.

== International competitions ==
Year	Competition	Venue	Position	Event	Notes
Representing Germany
2018	World U20 Championships	Tampere, Finland	8th	Decathlon (U20)	7333 pts
2019	European Indoor Championships	Glasgow, United Kingdom	5th	Heptathlon	6001 pts
2021	European Indoor Championships	Toruń, Poland	6th	Heptathlon	5995 pts

== Personal bests ==
Outdoor

- 100 metres – 10.73 (+0.3 m/s) (Filderstadt 2019)
- 400 metres – 47.93 (Filderstadt 2019)
- 1500 metres – 4:38.30 (Filderstadt 2018)
- 110 metres hurdles – 15.08 (+0.3 m/s, Frankfurt 2020)
- High jump – 2.08 (Hattersheim 2019)
- Pole vault – 5.10 (Filderstadt 2019)
- Long jump – 7.72 (+0.1 m/s, Tallinn 2021)
- Shot put – 15.81 (Tallinn 2021)
- Discus throw – 42.51 (Tallinn 2021)
- Javelin throw – 61.43 (Filderstadt 2019)
- Decathlon – 8132 (Filderstadt 2019)
Indoor
- 60 metres – 6.96 (Leverkusen 2020)
- 1000 metres – 2:42.37 (Leverkusen 2020)
- 60 metres hurdles – 8.37 (Leverkusen 2020)
- High jump – 2.10 (Frankfurt 2021)
- Pole vault – 5.21 (Frankfurt 2021)
- Long jump – 7.50 (Leverkusen 2020)
- Shot put – 14.34 (Halle 2019)
- Heptathlon – 6097 (Leverkusen 2020)
