= Jiří Sýkora (decathlete) =

Czech decathlete

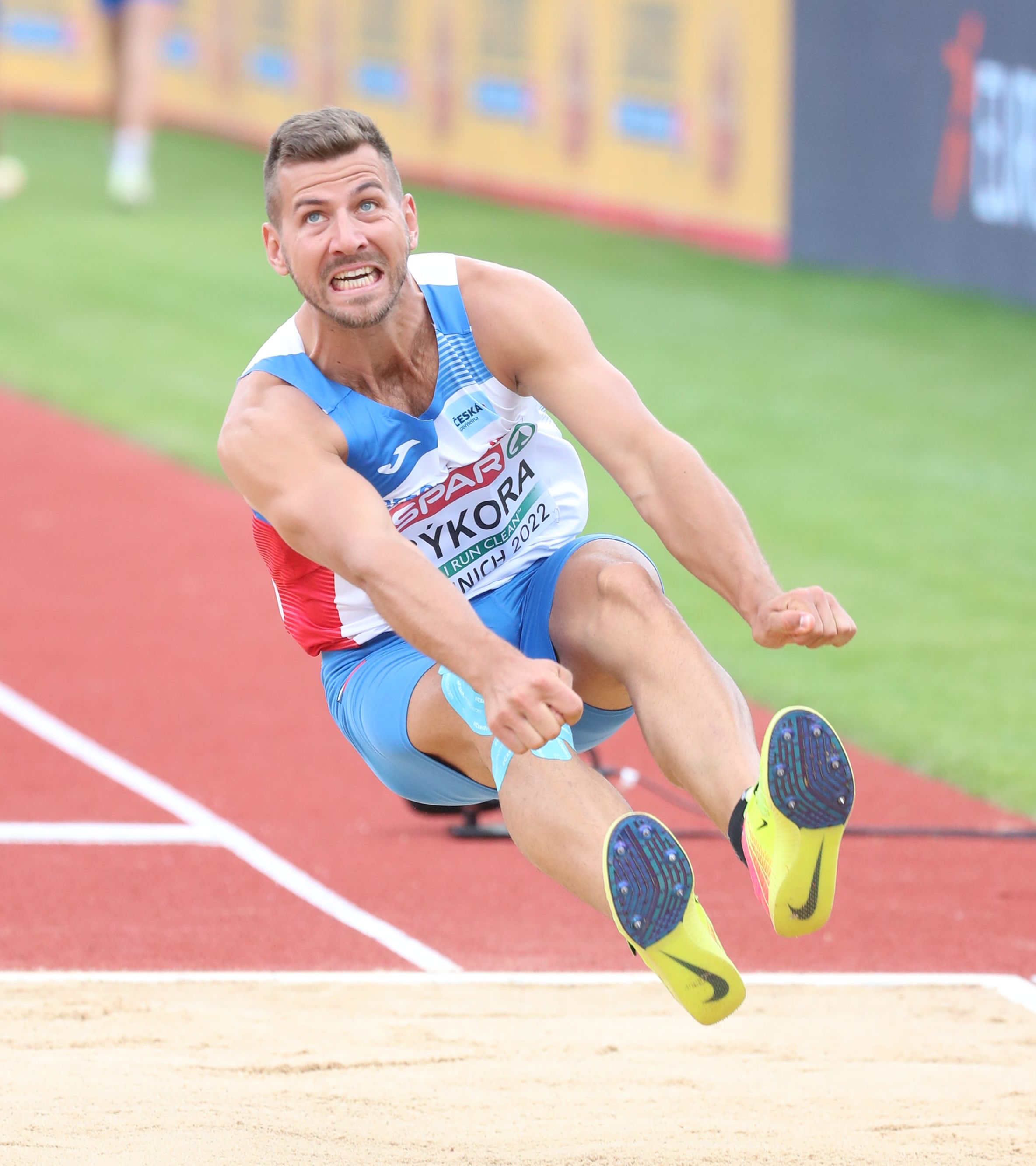
- Jiří Sýkora in 2022

Personal information
- Born: 20 January 1995 (age 30); Třebíč, Czech Republic
- Height: 1.90 m (6 ft 3 in)
- Weight: 91 kg (201 lb)

Sport
- Sport: Athletics
- Event: Decathlon
- Club: PSK Olymp Praha
- Coached by: Pavel Svoboda

Jiří Sýkora (born 20 January 1995 in Třebíč) is a Czech athlete competing in the combined events. He represented his country at the 2016 Summer Olympics in Rio de Janeiro where he finished last after scoring no points in the pole vault and 1500 metres. In addition he won the gold medal at the 2014 World Junior Championships. He is also the former world record holder in the junior decathlon.

== International competitions ==
Year	Competition	Venue	Position	Event	Notes
Representing the Czech Republic
2011	World Youth Championships	Lille, France	7th	Decathlon (U18)	5823 pts
2011	European Youth Olympic Festival	Trabzon, Turkey	8th	Long jump	6.86 m
2013	European Junior Championships	Rieti, Italy	–	Long jump	NM
2014	World Junior Championships	Eugene, United States	1st	Decathlon (U20)	8135 pts
2014	European Championships	Zürich, Switzerland	–	Decathlon	DNF
2015	European U23 Championships	Tallinn, Estonia	–	Decathlon	DNF
2016	European Championships	Amsterdam, Netherlands	–	Decathlon	DNF
2016	Olympic Games	Rio de Janeiro, Brazil	25th	Decathlon	6237 pts
2017	European Indoor Championships	Belgrade, Serbia	10th	Heptathlon	5902 pts
2017	European U23 Championships	Bydgoszcz, Poland	1st	Decathlon	8084 pts
2019	European Indoor Championships	Glasgow, United Kingdom	9th	Heptathlon	5016 pts
2021	Olympic Games	Tokyo, Japan	17th	Decathlon	7943 pts
2022	World Championships	Eugene, United States	13th	Decathlon	8107 pts
2022	European Championships	Munich, Germany	–	Decathlon	DNF

== Personal bests ==
Outdoor

- 100 metres – 10.86 (+1.1 m/s, Götzis 2016)
- 400 metres – 48.80 (Ribeira Brava 2014)
- 1000 metres – 3:00.68 (Lille 2011)
- 1500 metres – 4:36.47 (Götzis 2016)
- 110 metres hurdles – 14.15 (+1.5 m/s, Bydgoszcz 2017)
- High jump – 2.02 (Prague 2014)
- Pole vault – 4.85 (Plzeň 2021)
- Long jump – 7.64 (-0.3 m/s, Tábor 2013)
- Shot put – 15.22 (Plzen 2017)
- Discus throw – 50.67 (Hradec Králové 2017)
- Javelin throw – 66.91 (Arona 2021)
- Decathlon – 8122 (Arona 2021)

Indoor

- 60 metres – 6.99 (Prague 2017)
- 1000 metres – 2:47.48 (Prague 2019)
- 60 metres hurdles – 7.95 (Prague 2019)
- High jump – 2.00 (Sheffield 2014)
- Pole vault – 4.90 (Belgrade 2017)
- Long jump – 7.66 (Prague 2016)
- Shot put – 15.09 (Glasgow 2019)
- Heptathlon – 6006 (Prague 2019)
