= 2022 European Athletics Championships – Men's decathlon =

Men's decathlon at the 2022 European Athletics Championships
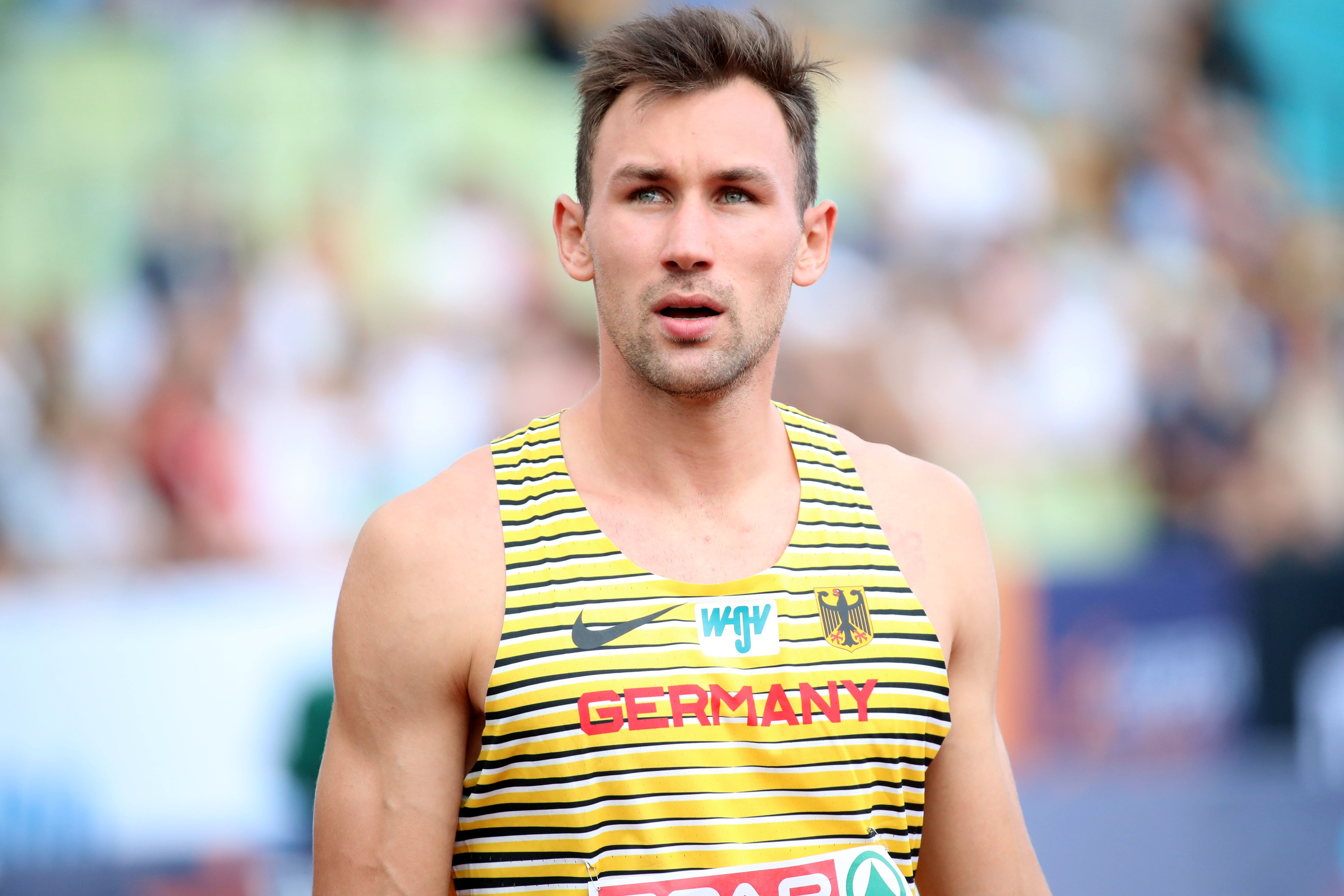
- Venue: Olympiastadion
- Location: Munich
- Dates: August 15 August 16
- Competitors: 21 from 11 nations
- Winning points: 8545

Medalists
gold medal	Niklas Kaul	Germany
silver medal	Simon Ehammer	Switzerland
bronze medal	Janek Õiglane	Estonia

The men's decathlon at the 2022 European Athletics Championships took place at the Olympiastadion on 15 and 16 August.

== Records ==
Standing records prior to the 2022 European Athletics Championships
World record	Kevin Mayer (FRA)	9126 pts	Talence, France	16 September 2018
European record	Kevin Mayer (FRA)	9126 pts	Talence, France	16 September 2018
Championship record	Daley Thompson (GBR)	8811 pts	Stuttgart, West Germany	28 August 1986
World Leading	Garrett Scantling (USA)	8867 pts	Fayetteville, United States	7 May 2022
Europe Leading	Kevin Mayer (FRA)	8816 pts	Eugene, United States	24 July 2022

== Schedule ==
Date	Time	Round
15 August 2022	10:05; 10:50; 12:40; 18:30; 21:15	100 metres Long jump Shot put High jump 400 metres
16 August 2022	09:05; 09:50; 11:30; 18:30; 21:35	110 metres hurdles Discus throw Pole vault Javelin throw 1500 metres

All times are local times (UTC+2)

== Results ==
=== 100 metres ===
Rank	Heat	Name	Nationality	Time	Notes	Points
1	3	Simon Ehammer	Switzerland	10.56		961
2	3	Rik Taam	Netherlands	10.76		915
3	3	Dario Dester	Italy	10.81		903
4	3	Sven Roosen	Netherlands	10.83	SB	899
5	3	Baptiste Thiery	France	10.87		890
6	1	Martin Roe	Norway	10.94	SB	874
7	3	Sander Skotheim	Norway	10.98		865
8	2	Janek Õiglane	Estonia	11.01		858
9	2	Paweł Wiesiołek	Poland	11.07		845
10	2	Jiří Sýkora	Czech Republic	11.09	SB	841
11	1	Adam Helcelet	Czech Republic	11.13	SB	832
12	2	Kai Kazmirek	Germany	11.15		827
13	1	Niklas Kaul	Germany	11.16	PB	825
14	2	Fredrik Samuelsson	Sweden	11.17		823
15	2	Arthur Abele	Germany	11.24		808
16	1	Karel Tilga	Estonia	11.27	SB	801
17	2	Maicel Uibo	Estonia	11.30		795
18	1	Niels Pittomvils	Belgium	11.32	SB	791
19	1	Marcus Nilsson	Sweden	11.39	SB	776
20	1	Tim Nowak	Germany	11.51		750
21	3	Kevin Mayer	France	11.67		717

=== Long jump ===
Rank	Group	Name	Nationality	#1	#2	#3	Result	Notes	Points	Total
1	B	Simon Ehammer	Switzerland	7.89	8.31	8.27	8.31	CB	1141	2102
2	B	Sander Skotheim	Norway	7.56	7.37	7.00	7.56		950	1815
3	B	Dario Dester	Italy	7.22	7.46	7.35	7.46		925	1828
4	B	Paweł Wiesiołek	Poland	7.15	x	7.45	7.45	SB	922	1767
5	A	Rik Taam	Netherlands	6.86	7.29	–	7.29	SB	883	1798
6	A	Adam Helcelet	Czech Republic	7.28	7.13	7.28	7.28	SB	881	1713
7	A	Karel Tilga	Estonia	7.28	x	x	7.28	SB	881	1682
8	B	Janek Õiglane	Estonia	7.26	7.27	x	7.27	SB	878	1736
9	B	Kai Kazmirek	Germany	7.25	x	7.11	7.25		874	1701
10	B	Maicel Uibo	Estonia	x	7.23	7.13	7.23		869	1664
11	A	Martin Roe	Norway	7.21	x	7.21	7.21	SB	864	1738
12	B	Sven Roosen	Netherlands	6.83	6.99	7.14	7.14		847	1746
13=	B	Niklas Kaul	Germany	6.98	7.10	7.06	7.10		838	1663
13=	A	Niels Pittomvils	Belgium	6.34	x	7.10	7.10	SB	838	1629
15	A	Arthur Abele	Germany	7.01	x	x	7.01		816	1624
16	A	Marcus Nilsson	Sweden	7.00	6.87	x	7.00	SB	814	1590
17	A	Tim Nowak	Germany	6.97	6.85	x	6.97		807	1557
18	A	Baptiste Thiery	France	6.94	6.87	6.75	6.94		799	1689
19	B	Jiří Sýkora	Czech Republic	6.92	6.77	6.73	6.92		795	1636
20	A	Fredrik Samuelsson	Sweden	x	6.91	x	6.91		792	1615
	B	Kevin Mayer	France	DNS						

=== Shot put ===
Rank	Group	Name	Nationality	#1	#2	#3	Result	Notes	Points	Total
1	B	Marcus Nilsson	Sweden	14.93	x	15.69	15.69	SB	832	2422
2	B	Adam Helcelet	Czech Republic	15.00	15.27	15.30	15.30		808	2521
3	B	Niels Pittomvils	Belgium	x	14.64	15.25	15.25		805	2434
4	B	Karel Tilga	Estonia	15.21	15.05	15.14	15.21	SB	803	2485
5	B	Paweł Wiesiołek	Poland	15.11	x	x	15.11	SB	796	2563
6	B	Arthur Abele	Germany	x	x	15.06	15.06	SB	793	2417
7	A	Niklas Kaul	Germany	14.13	14.26	14.90	14.90	SB	784	2447
8	B	Janek Õiglane	Estonia	14.82	14.49	x	14.82		779	2515
9	A	Martin Roe	Norway	14.77	x	14.68	14.77	SB	776	2514
10	A	Dario Dester	Italy	14.05	13.75	14.56	14.56	PB	763	2591
11	B	Maicel Uibo	Estonia	13.67	14.55	x	14.55		762	2426
12	B	Tim Nowak	Germany	14.27	14.14	x	14.27		745	2302
13	A	Simon Ehammer	Switzerland	14.24	14.08	13.96	14.24		743	2845
14	A	Fredrik Samuelsson	Sweden	14.18	13.95	x	14.18	SB	739	2354
15	A	Sven Roosen	Netherlands	13.95	14.13	x	14.13		736	2482
16	A	Kai Kazmirek	Germany	14.09	x	x	14.09		734	2435
17	A	Rik Taam	Netherlands	13.66	13.67	13.97	13.97	SB	727	2525
18	A	Sander Skotheim	Norway	13.65	13.57	x	13.65		707	2522
19	A	Baptiste Thiery	France	12.43	12.95	12.71	12.95	PB	664	2353
	B	Jiří Sýkora	Czech Republic	x	x	x	NM		0	1636
	B	Kevin Mayer	France	DNS						

=== High jump ===
Rank	Group	Name	Nationality	1.75	1.78	1.81	1.84	1.87	1.90	1.93	1.96	1.99	2.02	2.05	2.08	2.11	2.14	Result	Points	Notes	Total
1	A	Sander Skotheim	Norway	–	–	–	–	–	–	–	xo	–	o	–	xxo	xo	xxx	2.11	906		3428
2	A	Simon Ehammer	Switzerland	–	–	–	–	–	–	o	o	o	o	xo	xo	xxx		2.08	878	PB	3723
2	A	Maicel Uibo	Estonia	–	–	–	–	–	–	–	o	–	o	xo	xo	xxx		2.08	878		3304
4	A	Tim Nowak	Germany	–	–	–	–	–	–	–	o	o	xo	xo	xo	xxx		2.08	878	PB	3180
5	A	Niklas Kaul	Germany	–	–	–	–	–	–	o	o	o	o	xxr				2.02	822		3269
5	A	Kai Kazmirek	Germany	–	–	–	–	–	–	o	o	o	o	xxx				2.02	822		3257
7	B	Niels Pittomvils	Belgium	–	–	–	–	o	–	o	o	xxo	o	xxx				2.02	822	SB	3256
8	A	Janek Õiglane	Estonia	–	–	–	–	–	o	–	o	xxo	o	xxx				2.02	822		3337
9	B	Paweł Wiesiołek	Poland	–	–	o	–	xo	o	o	o	xo	xo	xxx				2.02	822	SB	3385
10	A	Dario Dester	Italy	–	–	o	–	xo	xxo	o	o	xxo	xxo	xxx				2.02	822	SB	3413
11	A	Marcus Nilsson	Sweden	–	–	–	–	o	–	o	o	o	xxx					1.99	794	SB	3216
12	A	Adam Helcelet	Czech Republic	–	–	–	–	–	o	o	o	xo	xxx					1.99	794		3315
13	A	Karel Tilga	Estonia	–	–	–	–	–	–	o	xo	xxx						1.96	767	SB	3252
14	B	Fredrik Samuelsson	Sweden	–	–	–	–	o	–	o	o	xxx						1.96	767	=SB	3121
15	B	Rik Taam	Netherlands	–	–	–	–	o	o	xxo	r							1.93	740		3265
16	B	Baptiste Thiery	France	o	o	xo	o	o	xxo	xxx								1.90	714		3067
17	B	Martin Roe	Norway	–	–	o	o	o	xxx									1.87	687	SB	3201
18	B	Sven Roosen	Netherlands	–	o	xo	xxo	xxx										1.84	661		3143
19	B	Arthur Abele	Germany	o	o	o	xxx											1.81	636		3053

=== 400 metres ===
Rank	Heat	Name	Nationality	Time	Notes	Points	Total
1	3	Simon Ehammer	Switzerland	47.40	SB	938	4661
2	3	Rik Taam	Netherlands	47.61		928	4193
3	3	Baptiste Thiery	France	47.66		926	3993
4	3	Sven Roosen	Netherlands	47.69	SB	924	4067
5	3	Niklas Kaul	Germany	47.87	PB	915	4184
6	3	Dario Dester	Italy	47.90		914	4327
7	3	Kai Kazmirek	Germany	48.24	SB	898	4155
8	2	Sander Skotheim	Norway	48.27	PB	896	4324
9	2	Janek Õiglane	Estonia	48.80	PB	871	4208
10	1	Marcus Nilsson	Sweden	49.77	SB	825	4041
11	1	Paweł Wiesiołek	Poland	49.88	SB	820	4205
12	1	Adam Helcelet	Czech Republic	50.16	SB	807	4122
13	1	Maicel Uibo	Estonia	50.21	SB	805	4109
14	1	Arthur Abele	Germany	50.37		798	3851
15	1	Karel Tilga	Estonia	50.66	SB	784	4036
16	2	Fredrik Samuelsson	Sweden	50.70		783	3904
17	1	Martin Roe	Norway	50.83	SB	777	3978
18	1	Niels Pittomvils	Belgium	51.09	SB	765	4021
	2	Tim Nowak	Germany	DNS			

=== 110 metres hurdles ===
Rank	Heat	Name	Nationality	Time	Notes	Points	Total
1	3	Simon Ehammer	Switzerland	13.75		1007	5668
2	1	Adam Helcelet	Czech Republic	14.36	SB	929	5051
3	3	Janek Õiglane	Estonia	14.39		925	5133
4	2	Kai Kazmirek	Germany	14.42		921	5076
5	3	Dario Dester	Italy	14.44		918	5245
6=	3	Niklas Kaul	Germany	14.45		917	5101
6=	3	Sven Roosen	Netherlands	14.45		917	4984
8	4	Arthur Abele	Germany	14.50		911	4762
9	2	Maicel Uibo	Estonia	14.79		875	4984
10	2	Niels Pittomvils	Belgium	14.81	SB	873	4894
11	1	Fredrik Samuelsson	Sweden	14.83	SB	870	4774
12	2	Marcus Nilsson	Sweden	14.88		864	4905
13	1	Baptiste Thiery	France	15.10		837	4830
14	1	Karel Tilga	Estonia	15.16	SB	830	4866
15	1	Paweł Wiesiołek	Poland	15.32	SB	811	5016
16	2	Sander Skotheim	Norway	15.64		774	5098
17	1	Martin Roe	Norway	16.19	SB	711	4689
	2	Rik Taam	Netherlands	DNS			

=== Discus throw ===
Rank	Group	Name	Nationality	#1	#2	#3	Result	Notes	Points	Total
1	B	Karel Tilga	Estonia	47.28	49.91	x	49.91		869	5735
2	B	Martin Roe	Norway	46.87	x	47.46	47.46	SB	818	5507
3	A	Niels Pittomvils	Belgium	42.16	44.97	46.77	46.77	SB	803	5697
4	A	Maicel Uibo	Estonia	45.39	46.29	46.59	46.59		800	5784
5	A	Marcus Nilsson	Sweden	44.55	46.06	45.01	46.06		789	5694
6	A	Kai Kazmirek	Germany	43.94	43.95	45.18	45.18		771	5874
7	B	Sander Skotheim	Norway	42.98	44.13	x	44.13		749	5847
8	B	Adam Helcelet	Czech Republic	40.26	43.44	x	43.44		735	5786
9	B	Dario Dester	Italy	40.95	x	43.04	43.04	PB	727	5972
10	B	Paweł Wiesiołek	Poland	40.35	42.84	x	42.84	SB	722	5748
11	B	Arthur Abele	Germany	x	42.38	x	42.38		713	4564
12	A	Janek Õiglane	Estonia	41.97	39.79	x	41.97		705	5838
13	A	Baptiste Thiery	France	39.98	x	41.93	41.93		704	5534
14	B	Niklas Kaul	Germany	39.63	40.66	41.80	41.80		701	5802
15	B	Fredrik Samuelsson	Sweden	36.11	40.44	41.38	41.38		693	5467
16	B	Sven Roosen	Netherlands	x	x	38.40	38.40		632	5616
17	A	Simon Ehammer	Switzerland	31.96	x	34.92	34.92		562	6230

=== Pole vault ===
Rank	Group	Name	Nationality	4.30	4.40	4.50	4.60	4.70	4.80	4.90	5.00	5.10	5.20	5.30	5.40	5.50	Result	Points	Notes	Total
1	A	Baptiste Thiery	France	–	–	–	–	–	–	–	–	–	o	–	o	xxx	5.40	1035		6569
2	A	Maicel Uibo	Estonia	–	–	–	–	–	o	–	o	o	o	o	xxx		5.30	1004	=SB	6788
3	A	Simon Ehammer	Switzerland	–	–	–	–	o	–	o	o	o	xo	xxx			5.20	972	PB	7202
4	A	Marcus Nilsson	Sweden	–	–	–	–		o	–	xo	xxo	xo	xxx			5.20	972	PB	6666
5	A	Janek Õiglane	Estonia	–	–	–	–	o	–	o	o	o	xxx				5.10	941		6779
6	B	Sander Skotheim	Norway	–	o	–	o	o	o	xo	o	xxx					5.00	910	SB	6757
7	A	Kai Kazmirek	Germany	–	–	–	–	o	–	o	xo	xxx					5.00	910	=SB	6757
8	B	Niklas Kaul	Germany	–	–	–	–	xo	o	o	xxx						4.90	880	=SB	6682
9	B	Dario Dester	Italy	–	–	–	o	–	xxo	xxo	xxx						4.90	880	=SB	6852
10	B	Fredrik Samuelsson	Sweden	–	–	o	–	o	o	xxx							4.80	849		6316
10	B	Paweł Wiesiołek	Poland	–	–	o	–	o	o	xxx							4.80	849	SB	6587
12	B	Sven Roosen	Netherlands	o	o	xxo	xxo	xxo	o	xr							4.80	849	PB	6465
13	A	Niels Pittomvils	Belgium	–	–	–	–	xo	–	xxx							4.70	819		6516
14	B	Martin Roe	Norway	–	–	o	o	xxx									4.60	790	SB	6297
15	B	Adam Helcelet	Czech Republic	–	o	–	xo	xxx									4.60	790	SB	6576
16	B	Arthur Abele	Germany	xo	o	xxo	xxx										4.50	760	SB	6235
	B	Karel Tilga	Estonia	–	–	xxx											NM	0		5735

=== Javelin throw ===
Rank	Group	Name	Nationality	#1	#2	#3	Result	Notes	Points	Total
1	B	Niklas Kaul	Germany	70.98	x	76.05	76.05	CB	982	7664
2	B	Janek Õiglane	Estonia	67.17	66.76	70.94	70.94		904	7683
3	B	Marcus Nilsson	Sweden	60.48	56.93	66.69	66.69	PB	839	7505
4	B	Fredrik Samuelsson	Sweden	60.57	63.53	x	63.53	SB	791	7107
5	A	Adam Helcelet	Czech Republic	60.59	63.44	60.91	63.44	SB	790	7366
6	A	Martin Roe	Norway	59.40	56.04	63.26	63.26	SB	787	7084
7	B	Maicel Uibo	Estonia	62.74	x	x	62.74		779	7567
8	B	Kai Kazmirek	Germany	60.08	58.97	61.23	61.23		756	7513
9	A	Arthur Abele	Germany	58.82	57.52	60.98	60.98	SB	753	6988
10	A	Sven Roosen	Netherlands	59.74	58.36	58.02	59.74		734	7199
11	A	Dario Dester	Italy	57.24	54.85	56.39	57.24	PB	696	7548
12	B	Sander Skotheim	Norway	55.72	56.48	x	56.48		685	7442
13	B	Niels Pittomvils	Belgium	x	x	56.30	56.30	SB	682	7198
14	A	Baptiste Thiery	France	52.84	55.07	54.24	55.07	PB	664	7233
15	A	Simon Ehammer	Switzerland	53.46	52.89	x	53.46		640	7842
	A	Paweł Wiesiołek	Poland	DNS						

=== 1500 metres ===
Rank	Name	Nationality	Time	Notes	Points	Total
1	Niklas Kaul	Germany	4:10.04	PB	881	8545
2	Baptiste Thiery	France	4:18.13	SB	824	8057
3	Sven Roosen	Netherlands	4:18.43	PB	822	8021
4	Marcus Nilsson	Sweden	4:18.51	SB	822	8327
5	Sander Skotheim	Norway	4:26.38	PB	769	8211
6	Arthur Abele	Germany	4:40.94	SB	674	7662
7	Dario Dester	Italy	4:41.63		670	8218
8	Martin Roe	Norway	4:41.72	SB	670	7754
9	Maicel Uibo	Estonia	4:42.18		667	8234
10	Niels Pittomvils	Belgium	4:42.62	SB	664	7862
11	Janek Õiglane	Estonia	4:42.78		663	8346
12	Fredrik Samuelsson	Sweden	4:44.94	SB	650	7757
13	Kai Kazmirek	Germany	4:46.82		638	8151
14	Adam Helcelet	Czech Republic	4:47.48	SB	634	8000
15	Simon Ehammer	Switzerland	4:48.72	SB	626	8468

== Final standings ==
Rank	Name	Country	Points	Notes
1st place, gold medalist(s)	Niklas Kaul	Germany	8545	SB
2nd place, silver medalist(s)	Simon Ehammer	Switzerland	8468	NR
3rd place, bronze medalist(s)	Janek Õiglane	Estonia	8346	
4	Marcus Nilsson	Sweden	8327	PB
5	Maicel Uibo	Estonia	8234	
6	Dario Dester	Italy	8218	NR
7	Sander Skotheim	Norway	8211	
8	Kai Kazmirek	Germany	8151	
9	Baptiste Thiery	France	8057	PB
10	Sven Roosen	Netherlands	8021	SB
11	Adam Helcelet	Czech Republic	8000	SB
12	Niels Pittomvils	Belgium	7862	SB
13	Fredrik Samuelsson	Sweden	7757	
14	Martin Roe	Norway	7754	SB
15	Arthur Abele	Germany	7662	SB
	Karel Tilga	Estonia	DNF	
	Paweł Wiesiołek	Poland	DNF	
	Rik Taam	Netherlands	DNF	
	Tim Nowak	Germany	DNF	
	Jiří Sýkora	Czech Republic	DNF	
	Kevin Mayer	France	DNF	
