= 2017 European Athletics U23 Championships – Men's decathlon =

The men's decathlon event at the 2017 European Athletics U23 Championships was held in Bydgoszcz, Poland, at Zdzisław Krzyszkowiak Stadium on 15 and 16 July.

== Medalists ==
Gold	Jiří Sýkora; Czech Republic
Silver	Fredrik Samuelsson; Sweden
Bronze	Elmo Savola; Finland

== Results ==
=== Final standings ===
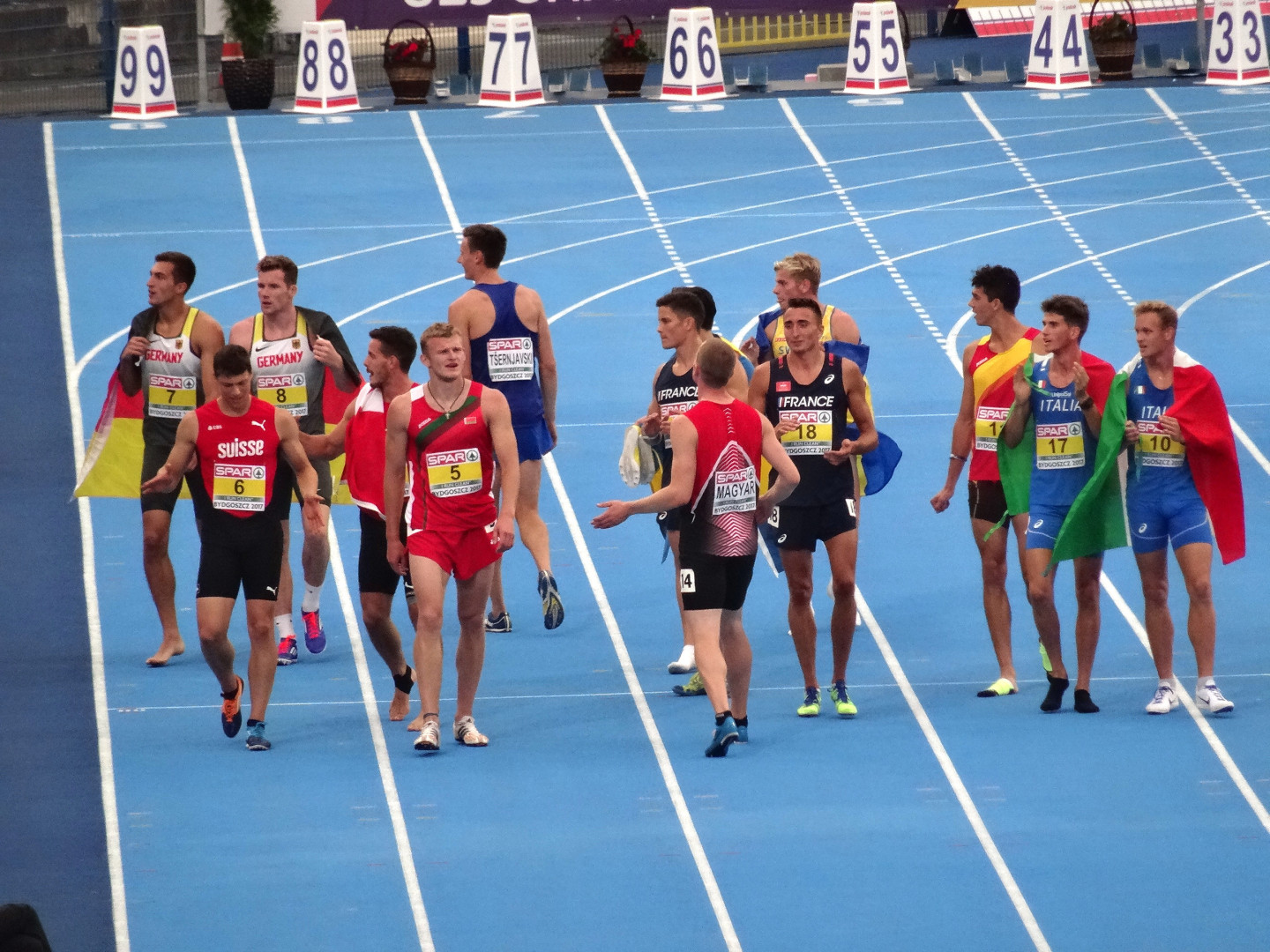
Athletes after the competition

The highest mark recorded in each event is highlighted in yellow

Rank	Athlete	Nationality	100m	LJ	SP	HJ	400m	110m H	DT	PV	JT	1500m	Points	Notes
1st place, gold medalist(s)	Jiří Sýkora	Czech Republic	10.99	7.09	14.65	1.96	49.19	14.15	50.37	4.50	63.36	4:50.30	8084	
2nd place, silver medalist(s)	Fredrik Samuelsson	Sweden	10.98	7.21	13.98	1.99	48.99	14.35	43.21	4.70	59.10	4:37.71	8010	
3rd place, bronze medalist(s)	Elmo Savola	Finland	10.84	7.29	13.97	1.96	49.14	14.21	37.35	4.70	61.89	4:39.50	7956	PB
4	Vitali Zhuk	Belarus	11.37	6.76	14.64	1.99	49.40	14.48	44.25	4.70	62.90	4:34.50	7921	PB
5	Maksim Andraloits	Belarus	10.98	7.36	13.88	1.99	49.23	14.47	43.89	4.70	51.97	4:47.76	7858	PB
6	Andri Oberholzer	Switzerland	11.13	7.54	13.62	2.08	50.99	14.78	39.42	4.90	51.59	4:40.75	7827	PB
7	Dennis Hutterer	Germany	11.02	7.17	14.23	1.99	50.05	14.91	47.14	4.60	50.87	4:43.30	7780	PB
8	Taavi Tšernjavski	Estonia	11.27	7.15	13.76	1.93	49.15	14.93	45.03	4.60	52.40	4:35.37	7708	
9	Torben Blech	Germany	10.86	6.80	13.74	1.96	50.79	14.40	41.00	5.20	51.82	4:59.83	7675	
10	Pablo Trescoli	Spain	11.23	7.12	13.37	1.96	49.73	14.59	37.24	4.40	55.35	4:33.01	7569	
11	Jacopo Zanatta	Italy	11.31	7.30	12.56	2.08	49.40	14.88	40.20	4.30	49.68	4:40.30	7536	PB
12	Axel Hubert	France	11.32	7.18	14.48	1.96	51.47	14.70	29.37	4.60	63.29	4:45.30	7483	
13	Kevin Fankl	Sweden	11.04	6.94	13.68	1.87	50.54	15.49	39.81	4.40	56.48	4:47.23	7340	
14	Pascal Magyar	Switzerland	11.49	6.80	12.43	1.96	49.86	15.21	42.58	4.30	51.58	4:41.32	7270	
15	Luca Bernaschina	Switzerland	11.30	7.38	13.50	1.81	51.11	15.15	38.02	4.40	50.99	4:42.40	7252	
16	Luca Dell'Acqua	Italy	10.98	7.19	11.37	1.93	50.08	14.82	34.78	4.10	51.15	4:33.38	7247	
17	Sebastian Ruthström	Sweden	11.48	7.03	11.79	1.96	51.02	15.25	38.68	4.20	58.92	4:48.16	7190	
18	Edgar Chave	France	11.40	6.69	11.37	1.84	49.86	15.48	34.84	4.10	45.65	4:29.62	6834	
19	Andreas Christodoulou	Cyprus	11.36	6.77	12.25	1.81	52.26	15.23	36.70	NM	57.47	DNF	5633	
	Maxence Pecatte	France	11.10	7.26	12.08	1.96	DNS	–	–	–	–	–	DNF	
	Tim Duckworth	Great Britain	10.51	NM	DNS	–	–	–	–	–	–	–	DNF	
	Tim Nowak	Germany	11.38	DNS	–	–	–	–	–	–	–	–	DNF	
	Risto Lillemets	Estonia	11.56	DNS	–	–	–	–	–	–	–	–	DNF	
