= Dario Dester =

Italian decathlete

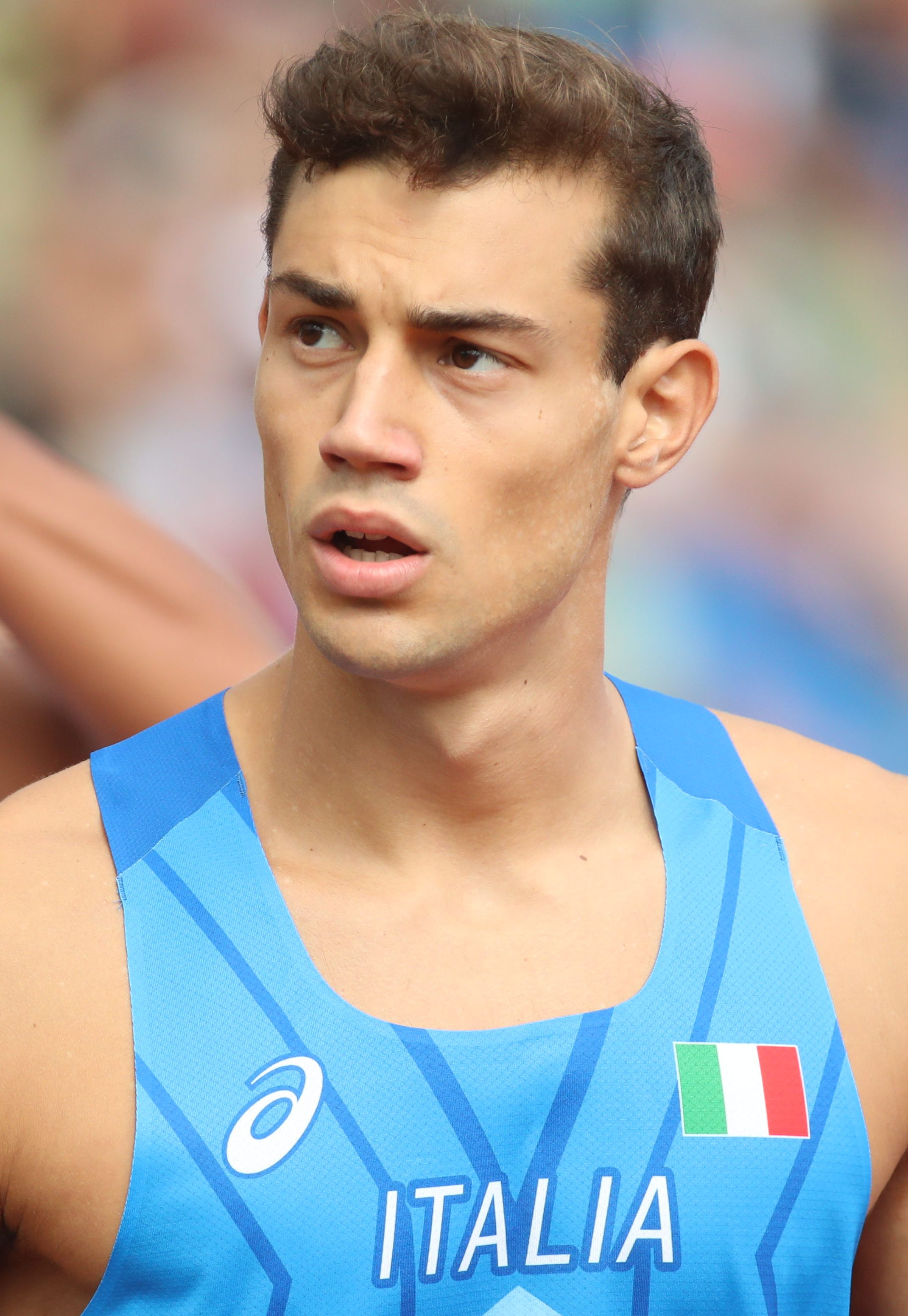
- Dester, 2022

Personal information
- National team: Italy
- Born: 22 July 2000 (age 25) Gavardo, Italy
- Height: 1.85 m (6 ft 1 in)

Sport
- Sport: Athletics
- Event: Combined events
- Club: C.S. Carabinieri
- Coached by: Pietro Frittolie

Achievements and titles
- Personal bests: Decathlon: 8235 (2024); Heptathlon: 6076 (2021)

Dario Dester (born 22 July 2000) is an Italian decathlete, current national record holder of the decathlon outdoor and heptathlon indoor.

== Career ==
On August 16, 2022, at the Munich 2022 European Championships he beat the decathlon Italian record of Beniamino Poserina which had stood for 26 years.

== Statistics ==
=== National records ===
- Heptathlon: 6076 pts (Ancona, 21 February 2021) - Current holder
  - 60 m: 7.02 / 875, long jump: 7.66 / 975, shot put: 14.03 / 730, high jump: 2.01 / 813;
  - 60 m hs: 8.13 / 949, pole vault: 5.00 / 910, 1000 m: 2:44.53 / 824.
- Decathlon: 8235 pts (Rome, 11 June 2024) - Current holder
  - 100m: 10.76 (7) 915; long jump: 7.32 (16) 891; shot put: 12.43 (23) 633; high jump: 2.02 (3) 822; 400m: 48.43 (8) 888
  - 110m hs: 14.28 (4) 939; discus throw: 41.00 (18) 685: pole vault: 4.90 (7) 880; javelin throw: 63.66 (4) 793; 1500m: 4:23.36 (5) 789

=== Personal Best Events ===
| Event | Performance | Venue | Date | Points |
|---|---|---|---|---|
| 100 m | 10.65 | Hypo-Meeting | 31 May 2025 | 993 |
| Long jump | 7.61 m | Arona, Tenerife | 12 June 2021 | 962 |
| Shot put | 14.56 m | Munich | 15 August 2022 | 763 |
| High jump | 2.07 m | Saronno | 27 April 2019 | 868 |
| 400 m | 47.70 | Arona, Tenerife | 4 June 2022 | 924 |
| 110 m hs | 14.11 | Modena | 25 April 2022 | 960 |
| Discus throw | 43.04 m | Munich | 16 July 2022 | 727 |
| Pole vault | 4.95 m | Saronno | 29 May 2021 | 895 |
| Javelin throw | 57.24 m | Munich | 16 August 2022 | 687 |
| 1500 m | 4:28.64 | Grosseto | 1 May 2022 | 754 |

=== Achievements ===
| Year | Competition | Venue | Rank | Event | Performance | Notes |
|---|---|---|---|---|---|---|
| 2021 | European Indoor Championships | Toruń | 7th | Heptathlon | 5835 pts | |
| 2021 | European U23 Championships | Tallinn | 4th | Heptathlon | 7935 pts | NU23R |
| 2022 | European Championships | Munich | 6th | Decathlon | 8218 pts | NR |
| 2023 | European Indoor Championships | Istanbul | – | Heptathlon | DNF | |

=== National titles ===
Dester has won four national championship at individual senior level.

- Italian Athletics Championships
  - Decathlon: 2020, 2022
- Italian Athletics Indoor Championships
  - Heptathlon: 2021, 2022

== See also ==
- Italian records in athletics
- Italian all-time lists - Decathlon
