= 2023 European Athletics Indoor Championships – Men's heptathlon =

Men's heptathlon at the 2023 European Athletics Indoor Championships
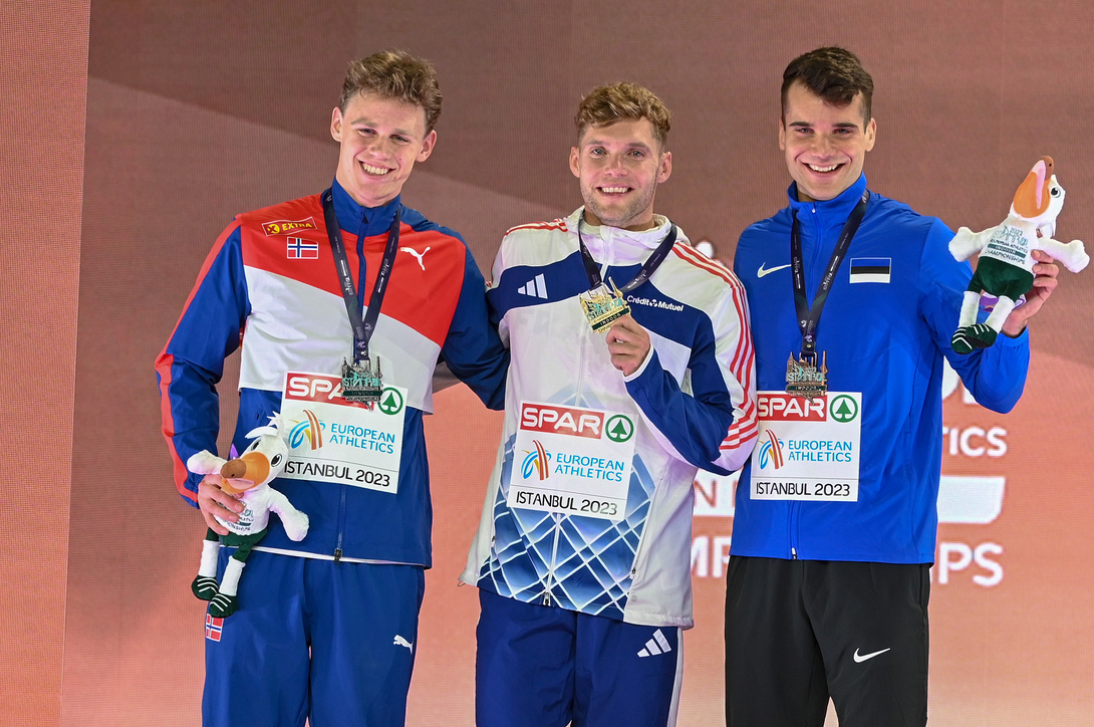
- The medalists of the event.
- Venue: Ataköy Athletics Arena
- Location: Istanbul, Turkey
- Dates: 4 and 5 March 2023
- Competitors: 14 from 9 nations
- Winning mark: 6348 pts EL

Medalists
gold medal	Kevin Mayer	France
silver medal	Sander Skotheim	Norway
bronze medal	Risto Lillemets	Estonia

The men's heptathlon event at the 2023 European Athletics Indoor Championships was held on 4 and 5 March 2023.

== Records ==
Standing records prior to the 2023 European Athletics Indoor Championships
World record	Ashton Eaton (USA)	6645	Istanbul, Turkey	10 March 2012
European record	Kevin Mayer (FRA)	6479	Belgrade, Serbia	5 March 2017
Championship record	Kevin Mayer (FRA)	6479	Belgrade, Serbia	5 March 2017
World Leading	Kyle Garland (USA)	6415	Lubbock, Texas, United States	27 January 2023
European Leading	Simon Ehammer (SUI)	6292	Aubière, France	29 January 2023

== Results ==
=== 60 metres ===
Rank	Heat	Lane	Athlete	Nationality	Time	Notes	Points
1	2	7	Simon Ehammer	Switzerland	6.80	=SB	955
2	2	3	Manuel Eitel	Germany	6.81	SB	951
3	2	5	Kevin Mayer	France	6.85	=PB	936
4	2	4	Hans-Christian Hausenberg	Estonia	6.86		933
5	2	2	Dario Dester	Italy	6.93		907
6	2	6	Jorge Ureña	Spain	6.96		897
7	2	8	Makenson Gletty	France	6.96		897
8	1	2	Sander Skotheim	Norway	7.05		865
8	1	8	Risto Lillemets	Estonia	7.05		865
10	1	7	Ondřej Kopecký	Czech Republic	7.09		851
11	1	6	Kai Kazmirek	Germany	7.19	SB	816
12	1	5	Maicel Uibo	Estonia	7.31		775
13	1	4	Tim Nowak	Germany	7.37	SB	755
14	1	3	Marcus Nilsson	Sweden	7.39		749

=== Long jump ===
Rank	Athlete	Nationality	#1	#2	#3	Result	Notes	Points	Total
1	Hans-Christian Hausenberg	Estonia	X	7.63	7.81	7.81	SB	1012	1945
2	Sander Skotheim	Norway	7.56	7.60	7.48	7.60		960	1825
3	Kevin Mayer	France	7.41	7.38	X	7.41	SB	913	1849
4	Ondřej Kopecký	Czech Republic	7.23	X	7.36	7.36		900	1751
5	Dario Dester	Italy	7.28	7.21	7.17	7.28		881	1788
6	Jorge Ureña	Spain	6.49	X	7.25	7.25		874	1771
7	Manuel Eitel	Germany	7.18	7.11	7.19	7.19	SB	859	1810
8	Makenson Gletty	France	6.84	6.33	7.18	7.18	=PB	857	1754
9	Maicel Uibo	Estonia	7.16	X	7.00	7.16	=SB	852	1627
10	Tim Nowak	Germany	6.90	6.85	7.06	7.06	SB	828	1583
11	Kai Kazmirek	Germany	6.95	6.98	7.01	7.01		816	1632
12	Risto Lillemets	Estonia	6.51	6.91	6.79	6.91		792	1657
13	Marcus Nilsson	Sweden	X	6.82	6.82	6.82	SB	771	1520
	Simon Ehammer	Switzerland	X	X	X	NM		0	955

=== Shot put ===
Rank	Athlete	Nationality	#1	#2	#3	Result	Notes	Points	Total
1	Makenson Gletty	France	15.74	X	16.07	16.07	PB	856	2610
10	Hans-Christian Hausenberg	Estonia	13.63	X	13.47	13.63	SB	706	2651
8	Sander Skotheim	Norway	13.82	X	14.09	14.09		734	2559
2	Kevin Mayer	France	15.62	X	15.81	15.81		840	2689
3	Manuel Eitel	Germany	15.27	X	14.93	15.27	PB	806	2616
4	Tim Nowak	Germany	14.94	X	-	14.94	SB	786	2369
5	Marcus Nilsson	Sweden	14.72	14.62	14.77	14.77		776	2296
6	Maicel Uibo	Estonia	14.62	14.69	X	14.69		771	2398
7	Risto Lillemets	Estonia	14.50	14.48	14.59	14.59	SB	765	2422
8	Sander Skotheim	Norway	13.82	X	14.09	14.09		734	2559
9	Kai Kazmirek	Germany	13.23	13.94	13.07	13.94	SB	725	2357
11	Jorge Ureña	Spain	13.58	13.29	X	13.58		703	2474
12	Ondřej Kopecký	Czech Republic	13.57	13.53	13.12	13.57		702	2453
	Dario Dester	Italy	Did not start						
	Simon Ehammer	Switzerland	Did not start						

=== High jump ===
Rank	Athlete	Nationality	1.86	1.89	1.92	1.95	1.98	2.01	2.04	2.07	2.10	2.13	2.16	2.19	2.22	Result	Points	Note	Total
1	Sander Skotheim	Norway	–	–	–	–	–	o	–	o	xo	xo	xo	xxo	xxx	2.19	982	CB	3541
2	Risto Lillemets	Estonia	–	–	o	o	xo	xo	o	o	xxx					2.07	868	=PB	3290
3	Jorge Ureña	Spain	o	–	xxo	–	o	xxo	xxx							2.01	813	SB	3287
4	Manuel Eitel	Germany	–	o	xxo	o	xxo	xxo	xxx							2.01	813	PB	3429
5	Kevin Mayer	France	–	–	–	o	xxo	xxx								1.98	785	SB	3474
6	Hans-Christian Hausenberg	Estonia	–	o	–	xo	xxx									1.95	758	SB	3409
6	Tim Nowak	Germany	–	–	–	xo	–	xxx								1.95	685	SB	3127
8	Makenson Gletty	France	–	xo	xxo	xo	xxx									1.95	758	SB	3368
9	Kai Kazmirek	Germany	–	o	o	xxo	xxx									1.95	758	SB	3115
9	Marcus Nilsson	Sweden	o	o	o	xxo	xxx									1.95	758	SB	3054
11	Ondřej Kopecký	Czech Republic	xo	o	xo	xxx										1.92	731		3184
	Maicel Uibo	Estonia	Did not start																

=== 60 metres hurdles ===
Rank	Heat	Lane	Athlete	Nationality	Time	Notes	Points	Total
1	2	3	Kevin Mayer	France	7.76	SB	1043	4517
2	2	5	Jorge Ureña	Spain	7.83		1025	4312
3	2	4	Hans-Christian Hausenberg	Estonia	8.00		982	4391
4	2	7	Risto Lillemets	Estonia	8.05		969	4259
5	1	6	Sander Skotheim	Norway	8.05		969	4510
6	2	6	Makenson Gletty	France	8.06		967	4335
7	2	2	Ondřej Kopecký	Czech Republic	8.15		944	4128
8	1	4	Manuel Eitel	Germany	8.15	SB	944	4373
9	1	2	Tim Nowak	Germany	8.23	SB	925	4052
10	1	5	Kai Kazmirek	Germany	8.25		920	4035
11	1	3	Marcus Nilsson	Sweden	8.56		846	3900

=== Pole vault ===
Rank	Athlete	Nationality	4.40	4.50	4.60	4.70	4.80	4.90	5.00	5.10	5.20	5.30	5.40	Result	Points	Note	Total
1	Kevin Mayer	France	–	–	–	–	–	–	o	–	o	o	xxx	5.30	1004	SB	5521
2	Risto Lillemets	Estonia	–	–	–	–	o	o	o	o	xxx			5.10	941	=PB	5200
3	Marcus Nilsson	Sweden	–	–	–	–	xo	–	o	o	xxx			5.10	941		4841
4	Sander Skotheim	Norway	–	–	–	o	o	xo	xo	xxx				5.00	910	PB	5420
5	Kai Kazmirek	Germany	–	–	–	–	o	–	xxx					4.80	849	SB	4884
5	Ondřej Kopecký	Czech Republic	–	–	o	–	o	–	xxx					4.80	849		4977
7	Manuel Eitel	Germany	o	xo	o	o	xxo	xxx						4.80	849	SB	5222
8	Jorge Ureña	Spain	–	xxo	–	–	xxo	xxx						4.80	849		5161
9	Tim Nowak	Germany	–	o	o	o	xxx							4.70	819	SB	4871
	Makenson Gletty	France	–	xxx										NM	0		4335
	Hans-Christian Hausenberg	Estonia	–	–	–	–	–	xxx						NM	0		4391

=== 1000 metres ===
Rank	Athlete	Nationality	Time	Notes	Points	Total
1	Sander Skotheim	Norway	2:37.82	=PB	898	6318
2	Risto Lillemets	Estonia	2:39.50		879	6079
3	Tim Nowak	Germany	2:41.61	SB	856	5727
4	Marcus Nilsson	Sweden	2:43.39	SB	836	5677
5	Kevin Mayer	France	2:44.20	PB	898	6348
6	Manuel Eitel	Germany	2:44.45	PB	825	6047
7	Ondřej Kopecký	Czech Republic	2:45.36		815	5792
8	Jorge Ureña	Spain	2:46.26		805	5966
9	Makenson Gletty	France	2:46.93		798	5133
10	Hans-Christian Hausenberg	Estonia	3:06.57	SB	601	4992
	Kai Kazmirek	Germany	Did not start			

=== Final results ===
The highest mark recorded in each event is highlighted in yellow

Rank	Athlete	Nationality	60m	LJ	SP	HJ	60m H	PV	1000m	Points	Notes
1st place, gold medalist(s)	Kevin Mayer	France	6.85	7.41	15.81	1.98	7.76	5.30	2:44.20	6348	EL
2nd place, silver medalist(s)	Sander Skotheim	Norway	7.05	7.60	14.09	2.19	8.05	5.00	2:37.82	6318	NR
3rd place, bronze medalist(s)	Risto Lillemets	Estonia	7.05	6.91	14.59	2.07	8.05	5.10	2:39.50	6079	SB
4	Manuel Eitel	Germany	6.81	7.19	15.27	2.01	8.15	4.80	2:44.45	6047	PB
5	Jorge Ureña	Spain	6.96	7.25	13.58	2.01	7.83	4.80	2:46.26	5966	
6	Ondřej Kopecký	Czech Republic	7.09	7.36	13.57	1.92	8.15	4.80	2:45.36	5792	
7	Tim Nowak	Germany	7.37	7.06	14.94	1.95	8.23	4.70	2:41.61	5727	SB
8	Marcus Nilsson	Sweden	7.39	6.82	14.77	1.95	8.56	5.10	2:43.39	5677	SB
9	Makenson Gletty	France	6.96	7.18	16.07	1.95	8.06	NM	2:46.93	5133	
10	Hans-Christian Hausenberg	Estonia	6.86	7.81	13.63	1.95	8.00	NM	3:06.57	4992	SB
	Kai Kazmirek	Germany	7.19	7.01	13.94	1.95	8.25	4.80	DNS	DNF	
	Maicel Uibo	Estonia	7.31	7.16	14.69	DNS	–	–	–	DNF	
	Dario Dester	Italy	6.93	7.28	DNS	–	–	–	–	DNF	
	Simon Ehammer	Switzerland	6.80	NM	DNS	–	–	–	–	DNF	
