= 2021 European Athletics Indoor Championships – Men's heptathlon =

The men's heptathlon event at the 2021 European Athletics Indoor Championships was held on 6 and 7 March 2021.

== Medalists ==
Gold	Silver	Bronze
Kevin Mayer; France	Jorge Ureña; Spain	Paweł Wiesiołek; Poland

== Records ==
Standing records prior to the 2021 European Athletics Indoor Championships
World record	Ashton Eaton (USA)	6645	Istanbul, Turkey	10 March 2012
European record	Kevin Mayer (FRA)	6479	Belgrade, Serbia	5 March 2017
Championship record	Kevin Mayer (FRA)	6479	Belgrade, Serbia	5 March 2017
World Leading	Ilya Shkurenyov (RUS)	6269	Smolensk, Russia	19 February 2021
European Leading	Ilya Shkurenyov (RUS)	6269	Smolensk, Russia	19 February 2021

== Results ==
=== 60 metres ===
Rank	Heat	Lane	Athlete	Nationality	Time	Notes	Points
1	2	4	Simon Ehammer	Switzerland	6.75	=CB	973
2	2	8	Kevin Mayer	France	6.86	PB	933
3	2	6	Rik Taam	Netherlands	6.94		904
4	2	7	Paweł Wiesiołek	Poland	6.95		900
5	1	3	Dario Dester	Italy	6.97	PB	893
6	2	3	Andreas Bechmann	Germany	7.02	=SB	875
7	1	4	Jorge Ureña	Spain	7.03	=SB	872
8	2	5	Risto Lillemets	Estonia	7.04		868
9	1	7	Maksim Andraloits	Belarus	7.12		840
10	1	5	Kai Kazmirek	Germany	7.15	=PB	830
11	1	6	Darko Pešić	Montenegro	7.21		809
12	1	8	Pieter Braun	Netherlands	7.25		796

=== Long jump ===
Rank	Athlete	Nationality	#1	#2	#3	Result	Notes	Points	Total
1	Simon Ehammer	Switzerland	7.61	7.59	7.89	7.79	PB	1033	2006
2	Dario Dester	Italy	6.90	7.59	7.61	7.61		962	1855
3	Andreas Bechmann	Germany	7.19	7.49	x	7.49	SB	932	1807
4	Kevin Mayer	France	7.40	7.45	7.47	7.47	SB	927	1860
5	Pieter Braun	Netherlands	7.35	x	7.38	7.38		905	1701
6	Jorge Ureña	Spain	7.18	7.33	6.99	7.33	SB	893	1765
7	Paweł Wiesiołek	Poland	7.31	7.22	7.17	7.31		888	1788
8	Rik Taam	Netherlands	7.06	7.29	–	7.29		883	1787
9	Risto Lillemets	Estonia	6.96	7.10	7.28	7.28	=PB	881	1749
10	Darko Pešić	Montenegro	x	6.95	6.83	6.95		802	1611
11	Maksim Andraloits	Belarus	6.88	6.87	6.90	6.90		790	1630
12	Kai Kazmirek	Germany	6.55	–	–	6.55		709	1539

=== Shot put ===
Rank	Athlete	Nationality	#1	#2	#3	Result	Notes	Points	Total
1	Kevin Mayer	France	15.03	15.23	16.32	16.32	PB	871	2731
2	Darko Pešić	Montenegro	15.89	x	15.59	15.89		844	2455
3	Pieter Braun	Netherlands	15.40	x	x	15.40	PB	814	2515
4	Paweł Wiesiołek	Poland	15.06	x	15.27	15.27		806	2594
5	Maksim Andraloits	Belarus	x	15.07	x	15.07		794	2424
6	Simon Ehammer	Switzerland	14.30	14.75	x	14.75		774	2780
7	Jorge Ureña	Spain	14.57	14.07	x	14.57	PB	763	2528
8	Rik Taam	Netherlands	14.31	14.24	14.52	14.52	SB	760	2547
9	Risto Lillemets	Estonia	14.45	14.50	x	14.50	SB	759	2508
10	Dario Dester	Italy	13.25	13.47	14.25	14.25	PB	744	2599
11	Andreas Bechmann	Germany	13.80	13.45	x	13.80		716	2523
	Kai Kazmirek	Germany	Did not start						

=== High jump ===
Rank	Athlete	Nationality	1.86	1.89	1.92	1.95	1.98	2.01	2.04	2.07	2.10	2.13	Result	Notes	Points	Total
1	Maksim Andraloits	Belarus	–	–	o	o	o	o	o	o	xo	xxx	2.10		896	3320
2	Andreas Bechmann	Germany	–	–	–	o	–	xo	o	xo	xo	xxx	2.10	=PB	896	3419
3	Jorge Ureña	Spain	o	–	o	–	o	o	o	xxo	xo	xxx	2.10	PB	896	3424
4	Kevin Mayer	France	–	–	xo	o	o	xo	o	xr			2.04		840	3571
5	Rik Taam	Netherlands	–	o	xo	xxo	o	xo	o	xxx			2.04		840	3387
6	Risto Lillemets	Estonia	–	–	o	o	o	xo	xo	xxx			2.04		840	3348
7	Darko Pešić	Montenegro	o	–	o	o	xo	o	xxx				2.01		813	3268
8	Paweł Wiesiołek	Poland	o	–	o	o	o	xo	xxx				2.01	SB	813	3407
9	Pieter Braun	Netherlands	–	o	o	xo	xo	xr					1.98		785	3300
10	Dario Dester	Italy	o	–	xo	xo	xxx						1.95		758	3357
10	Simon Ehammer	Switzerland	o	–	xo	xo	xxx						1.95		758	3538
	Kai Kazmirek	Germany	Did not start													

=== 60 metres hurdles ===
Rank	Heat	Lane	Athlete	Nationality	Result	Notes	Points	Total
1	2	5	Kevin Mayer	France	7.78		1038	4609
2	2	3	Simon Ehammer	Switzerland	7.82		1028	4566
3	2	6	Jorge Ureña	Spain	7.87	SB	1015	4439
4	1	8	Risto Lillemets	Estonia	8.09		959	4307
5	1	3	Rik Taam	Netherlands	8.13		949	4336
6	1	6	Darko Pešić	Montenegro	8.21		930	4198
7	1	5	Dario Dester	Italy	8.25		920	4277
8	1	7	Paweł Wiesiołek	Poland	8.27		915	4322
9	1	4	Andreas Bechmann	Germany	8.57		843	4262
	2	7	Maksim Andraloits	Belarus	DNF		0	3320
	2	4	Pieter Braun	Netherlands	Did not start			
	2	8	Kai Kazmirek	Germany	Did not start			

=== Pole vault ===
Rank	Athlete	Nationality	4.40	4.50	4.60	4.70	4.80	4.90	5.00	5.10	5.20	5.30	Result	Notes	Points	Total
1	Kevin Mayer	France	–	–	–	–	–	–	xo	o	o	xxr	5.20	SB	972	5581
2	Paweł Wiesiołek	Poland	–	–	o	o	xo	o	xxo	o	xxo	xxx	5.20	PB	972	5294
3	Andreas Bechmann	Germany	–	–	–	–	o	–	o	o	xxx		5.10		941	5203
4	Risto Lillemets	Estonia	–	–	o	–	o	xxo	o	xxx			5.00		910	5217
5	Jorge Ureña	Spain	–	–	xo	–	o	o	xx				4.90	SB	880	5319
6	Rik Taam	Netherlands	o	–	o	o	o	o	xx				4.80	SB	849	5185
7	Maksim Andraloits	Belarus	–	–	–	–	xo	xxx					4.80	=PB	849	4169
8	Darko Pešić	Montenegro	o	xo	xxo	xxx							4.60	=SB	790	4988
9	Dario Dester	Italy	o	–	xxx								4.40		731	5008
	Simon Ehammer	Switzerland	–	xxx									NM		0	4566
	Pieter Braun	Netherlands	Did not start													
	Kai Kazmirek	Germany	Did not start													

=== 1000 metres ===
Rank	Athlete	Nationality	Result	Notes	Points
1	Rik Taam	Netherlands	2:35.35	PB	926
2	Paweł Wiesiołek	Poland	2:43.13	SB	839
3	Jorge Ureña	Spain	2:43.16		839
4	Risto Lillemets	Estonia	2:43.21		838
5	Darko Pešić	Montenegro	2:43.43	SB	836
6	Dario Dester	Italy	2:44.27	SB	827
7	Kevin Mayer	France	2:45.72		811
8	Andreas Bechmann	Germany	2:47.51		792
	Maksim Andraloits	Belarus	Did not start		
	Simon Ehammer	Switzerland	Did not start		

=== Final results ===
The highest mark recorded in each event is highlighted in yellow

Rank	Athlete	Nationality	60m	LJ	SP	HJ	60m H	PV	1000m	Points	Notes
1st place, gold medalist(s)	Kevin Mayer	France	6.86	7.47	16.32	2.04	7.78	5.20	2:45.72	6392	WL
2nd place, silver medalist(s)	Jorge Ureña	Spain	7.03	7.33	14.57	2.10	7.87	4.90	2:43.16	6158	
3rd place, bronze medalist(s)	Paweł Wiesiołek	Poland	6.95	7.31	15.27	2.01	8.27	5.20	2:43.13	6133	PB
4	Rik Taam	Netherlands	6.94	7.29	14.52	2.04	8.13	4.80	2:35.35	6111	PB
5	Risto Lillemets	Estonia	7.04	7.28	14.50	2.04	8.09	5.00	2:43.21	6055	
6	Andreas Bechmann	Germany	7.02	7.49	13.80	2.10	8.57	5.10	2:47.51	5995	
7	Dario Dester	Italy	6.97	7.61	14.25	1.95	8.25	4.40	2:44.27	5835	
8	Darko Pešić	Montenegro	7.21	6.95	15.89	2.01	8.21	4.60	2:43.43	5824	
	Maksim Andraloits	Belarus	7.12	6.90	15.07	2.10	DNF	4.80	DNS	DNF	
	Simon Ehammer	Switzerland	6.75	7.89	14.75	1.95	7.82	NM	DNS	DNF	
	Pieter Braun	Netherlands	7.25	7.38	15.40	1.98	DNS			DNF	
	Kai Kazmirek	Germany	7.15	6.55	DNS					DNF	
