= Janek Õiglane =

Estonian decathlete (born 1994)

Janek Õiglane OLY
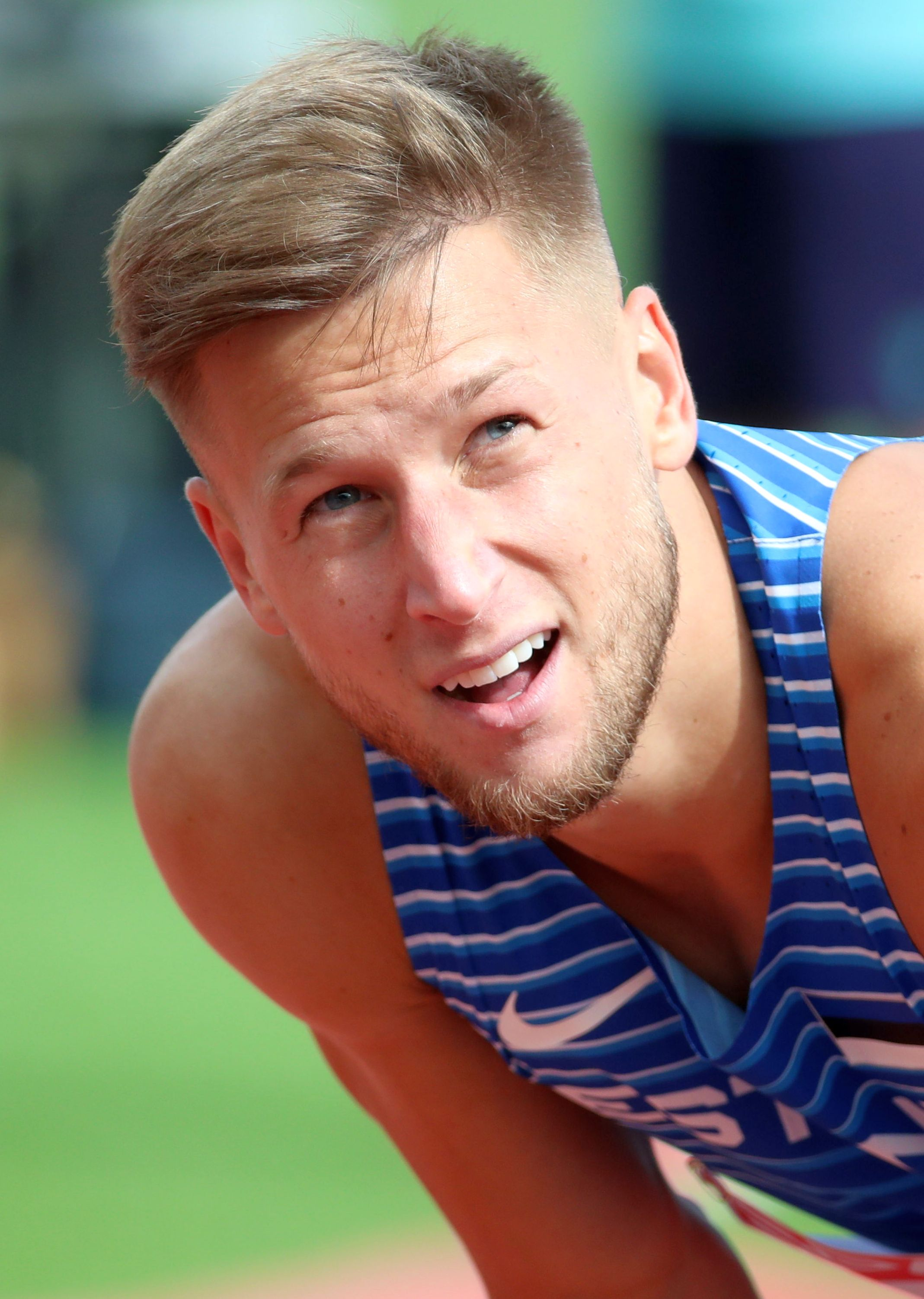
- Õiglane in 2022

Personal information
- Born: 25 April 1994 (age 32) Rakvere, Estonia
- Height: 1.87 m (6 ft 2 in)
- Weight: 84 kg (185 lb)

Sport
- Country: Estonia
- Sport: Track and field
- Event: Decathlon
- Club: Audentese SK

Achievements and titles
- Personal best(s): Decathlon: 8,572 (2024); Heptathlon: 6,085 (2019)
Medal record
Men's athletics
Representing Estonia
European Championships
Bronze medal – third place	2022 Munich	Decathlon
European U23 Championships
Bronze medal – third place	2015 Tallinn	Decathlon
- Updated on 7 August 2024

Janek Õiglane (born 25 April 1994 in Rakvere) is an Estonian Olympic decathlete. He has competed at multiple major championships and competed at the 2024 Paris Olympic Games, finishing in fifth place.

== Career ==
He won a bronze medal at the 2015 European U23 Championships. He competed for Estonia and placed nineteenth overall at the 2015 World Athletics Championships in Beijing, China with 7581 points.

He placed fourth overall at the 2017 World Athletics Championships in London, England, with a lifetime best of 8371 points, including a javelin throw personal best of 71.73 metres. He moved in late 2017 to work with coach Andrei Nazarov. He also spent three months with the Estonian Army in 2018 before a heel and hamstring injury ruled him out of the 2018 season. He set a personal best tally of 6085 points in the indoor heptathlon Tallinn, in 2019 to become the eighth Estonian all-time to go over 6000 points, and qualified for the European Indoor Championships in Glasgow but was ruled out by a freak injury landing a pole vault jump. He finished in sixth place at the 2019 World Athletics Championships in Doha with 8297 points, his efforts included going sub-11 seconds for the first time in the 100 metres with a time of 10.94 seconds, a lifetime 400m best of 49.14, and a new javelin personal best of 72.46m.

He did not complete the decathlon at the 2022 World Athletics Championships in Eugene, Oregon. He won a bronze medal in the decathlon at the 2022 European Athletics Championships in Munich, Germany. He finished in sixth place at the 2023 World Athletics Championships in Budapest, Hungary with a personal best total of 8,524 points, and gained the automatic qualification standard for the Olympic Games the following year, for his Olympic debut.

He withdrew from the 2024 European Athletics Championships in Rome in June 2024 after suffering a knee injury in the long jump. He set a new personal best score of 8572 points in the decathlon in Paris to finish fifth at the 2024 Olympic Games. He was given the honour of carrying the Estonian flag at the closing ceremony of the Games.

== Personal life ==
He and Kendra married in 2022. In February 2025, he announced on social media that they were expecting their first child.

== International competitions ==
Year	Competition	Venue	Position	Event	Result
Representing Estonia
2011	World Youth Championships	Lille	11th	Javelin throw (700g)	64.70 m
2011	European Youth Olympic Festival	Trabzon	7th	Javelin throw (700g)	68.50 m
2013	European Junior Championships	Rieti	4th	Decathlon (junior)	7604 pts
2015	European U23 Championships	Tallinn	3rd	Decathlon	7945 pts
2015	World Championships	Beijing	19th	Decathlon	7581 pts
2016	European Championships	Amsterdam	12th	Decathlon	7762 pts
2017	World Championships	London	4th	Decathlon	8371 pts
2019	European Indoor Championships	Glasgow	–	Heptathlon	DNF
2019	World Championships	Doha	6th	Decathlon	8297 pts
2022	World Championships	Eugene	–	Decathlon	DNF
2022	European Championships	Munich	3rd	Decathlon	8346 pts
2023	World Championships	Budapest	6th	Decathlon	8524 pts
2024	European Championships	Rome	–	Decathlon	DNF
2024	Olympic Games	Paris	5th	Decathlon	8572 pts
2025	World Championships	Tokyo, Japan	–	Decathlon	DNF

== Personal bests ==
Information from World Athletics profile unless otherwise noted.

=== Outdoor ===
As of 24 June 2025

Event	Performance	Location	Date	Points
Decathlon	—N/a	Paris	2–3 August 2024	8,572 points
100 meters	10.89 (+1.2 m/s)	Knoxville	7 April 2022	895 points
Long jump	7.47 m (24 ft 6 in) (+0.3 m/s)	Budapest	23 August 2023	927 points
Shot put	15.38 m (50 ft 5 1/2 in)	Rakvere	26 July 2019	813 points
High jump	2.05	Eugene	23 July 2022	850 points
400 meters	48.02 m (157 ft 6 1/2 in)	Paris	2 August 2024	908 points
110 meters hurdles	14.33 (+1.6 m/s)	Knoxville	8 April 2022	932 points
Discus throw	45.94 m (150 ft 8 1/2 in)	Tallinn	27 June 2021	796 points
Pole vault	5.30 m (17 ft 4 1/2 in)	Paris	3 August 2024	1,004 points
Javelin throw	72.46 m (237 ft 8 3/4 in)	Doha	3 October 2019	923 points
1500 meters	4:23.43	Budapest	26 August 2023	788 points
Virtual Best Performance				8,827 points

Event	Performance	Location	Date
200 meters	23.60 (-0.1 m/s)	Tallinn	18 May 2014
800 meters	1:58.20	Espoo	19 May 2012
Triple jump	14.20 (+1.1 m/s)	Rakvere	22 July 2012

=== Indoor ===
As of 24 June 2025

Event	Performance	Location	Date	Points
Heptathlon	—N/a	Tallinn	2–3 February 2019	6,085 points
60 meters	7.07	Tallinn	2 February 2019	858 points
Long jump	7.34 m (24 ft 3/4 in)	Tallinn	2 February 2019	857 points
Shot put	15.50 m (50 ft 10 in)	Glasgow	2 March 2019	820 points
High jump	2.01 m (6 ft 7 in)	Glasgow	2 February 2019	813 points
60 meters hurdles	8.05	Tallinn	2 January 2022	969 points
Pole vault	5.19 m (17 ft 1/4 in)	Tallinn	3 February 2019	969 points
1000 meters	2:44.37	Tallinn	14 February 2016	825 points
Virtual Best Performance				6,150 points
