= Tim Nowak =

German decathlete

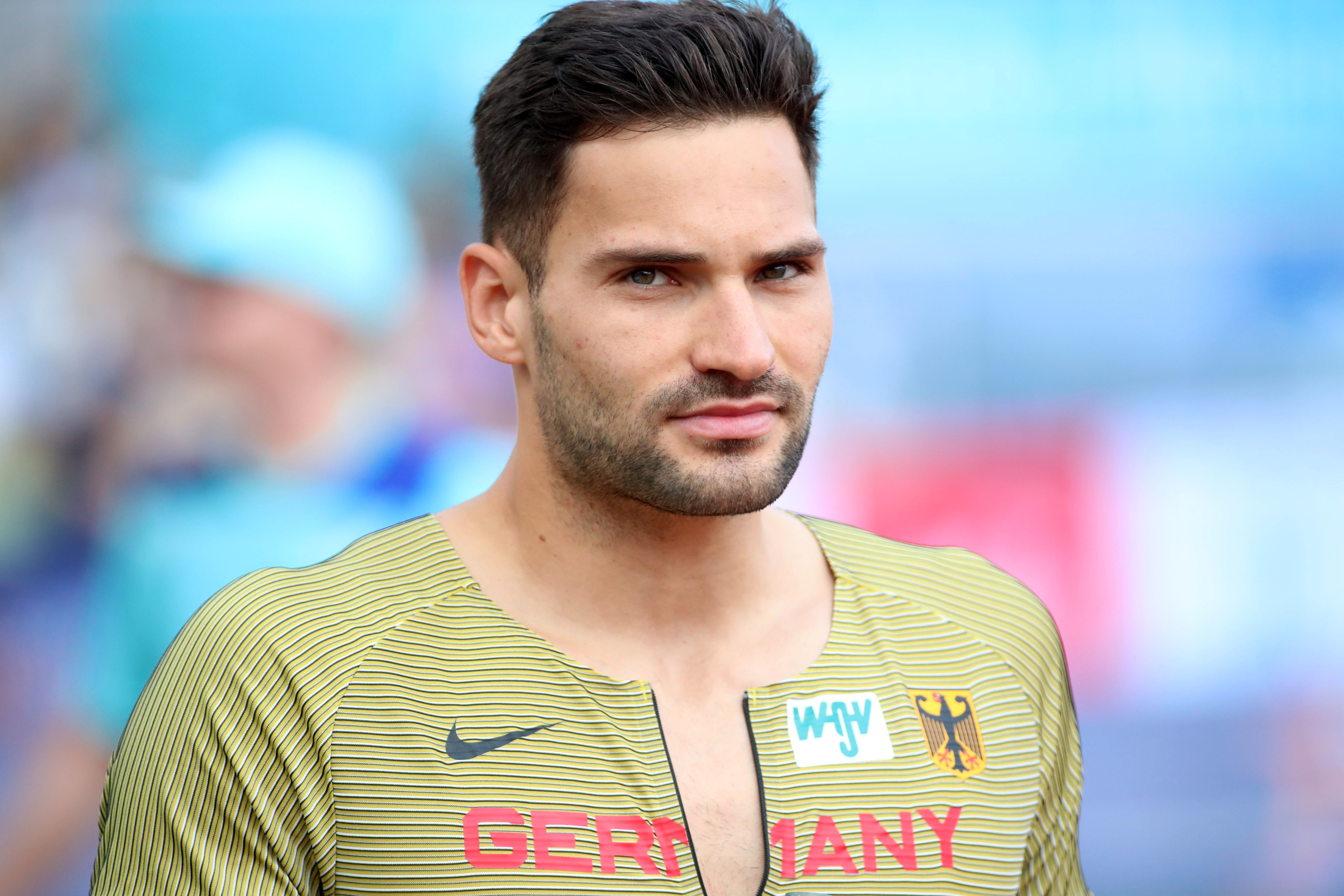
- Nowak at the 2022 European Championships

Personal information
- Born: 13 August 1995 (age 30) Bad Mergentheim, Germany
- Height: 182 cm (6 ft 0 in)
- Weight: 82 kg (181 lb)

Sport
- Sport: Athletics
- Event: Decathlon
- Club: SSV Ulm 1846
- Coached by: Christopher Hallmann

Tim Nowak (born 13 August 1995 in Bad Mergentheim) is a German athlete competing in the combined events. He represented his country at the 2016 World Indoor Championships finishing seventh.

== Competition record ==
Year	Competition	Venue	Position	Event	Notes
Representing Germany
2012	World Junior Championships	Barcelona, Spain	9th	Decathlon (junior)	7356 pts
2013	European Junior Championships	Rieti, Italy	3rd	Decathlon (junior)	7778 pts
2014	World Junior Championships	Eugene, United States	3rd	Decathlon (junior)	7980 pts
2015	European U23 Championships	Tallinn, Estonia	–	Decathlon	DNF
2016	World Indoor Championships	Portland, United States	7th	Heptathlon	5832 pts
2016	European Championships	Amsterdam, Netherlands	19th	Decathlon	6646 pts
2017	European U23 Championships	Bydgoszcz, Poland	–	Decathlon	DNF
2019	World Championships	Doha, Qatar	10th	Decathlon	8122 pts
2022	World Championships	Eugene, United States	18th	Decathlon	7008 pts
2022	European Championships	Munich, Germany	–	Decathlon	DNF
2023	European Indoor Championships	Istanbul, Turkey	7th	Heptathlon	5727 pts
2024	European Championships	Rome, Italy	9th	Decathlon	8150 pts
2025	European Indoor Championships	Apeldoorn, Netherlands	10th	Heptathlon	5913 pts
2025	World Indoor Championships	Nanjing, China	7th	Heptathlon	5935 pts

== Personal bests ==
Outdoor
- 100 metres – 11.04 (+1.3 m/s, Rieti 2013)
- 200 metres – 22.39 (-0.1 m/s, Neuwied-Engers 2015)
- 400 metres – 48.90 (Ratingen 2018)
- 1500 metres – 4:20.66 (Götzis 2019)
- 110 metres hurdles – 14.46 (+0.2 m/s, Neuwied-Engers 2015)
- High jump – 2.04 (Neuwied-Engers 2015)
- Pole vault – 5.00 (Ratingen 2018)
- Long jump – 7.33 (+1.2 m/s, Knoxville 2018)
- Shot put – 14.86 (Götzis 2019)
- Discus throw – 47.27 (Götzis 2019)
- Javelin throw – 64.22 (Halle 2017)
- Decathlon – 8229 (Talence 2018)
Indoor
- 60 metres – 7.17 (Tallinn 2015)
- 1000 metres – 2:39.74 (Halle 2019)
- 60 metres hurdles – 8.21 (Portland 2016)
- High jump – 2.09 (Hamburg 2016)
- Pole vault – 5.10 (Halle 2019)
- Long jump – 7.18 (Hamburg 2016)
- Shot put – 14.79 (Halle 2019)
- Heptathlon – 5906 (Clermont-Ferrand 2018)
