= 2012 World Junior Championships in Athletics – Men's decathlon =

The men's decathlon at the 2012 World Junior Championships in Athletics was held at the Estadi Olímpic Lluís Companys on 10 and 11 July.

== Medalists ==
Gold	Gunnar Nixon; United States
Silver	Jake Stein; Australia
Bronze	Tim Dekker; Netherlands

== Records ==
Standing records prior to the 2012 World Junior Championships in Athletics
World Junior Record	Torsten Voss (GDR)	8397	Erfurt, East Germany	7 July 1982
Championship Record	Arkadiy Vasilyev (RUS)	8059	Beijing, China	17 August 2006
World Junior Leading	Pieter Braun (NED)	7953	Emmeloord, Netherlands	18 May 2012
Broken records during the 2012 World Junior Championships in Athletics
World Junior Leading	Gunnar Nixon (USA)	8018	Barcelona, Spain	11 July 2012

== Results ==
=== 100 metres ===
Rank	Heat	Lane	Name	Nationality	Time	Notes	Points
1	3	8	Lukas Schmitz	Germany	11.00	PB	861
1	3	2	Benjamin Gföhler	Switzerland	11.00	PB	861
3	1	7	Karl Robert Saluri	Estonia	11.04	PB	852
4	3	3	Cedric Dubler	Australia	11.05	PB	850
5	3	4	Tim Dekker	Netherlands	11.06		847
6	1	8	Felipe dos Santos	Brazil	11.07	PB	845
7	1	4	Markus Leemet	Estonia	11.09	PB	841
8	3	5	Ruben Gado	France	11.10		838
9	2	8	Vacláv Sedlák	Czech Republic	11.13	PB	832
10	2	3	Abdel Kader Larrinaga	Cuba	11.20	PB	817
11	1	9	Juuso Hassi	Finland	11.21	PB	814
12	2	7	Gunnar Nixon	United States	11.23	SB	810
13	3	6	Pieter Braun	Netherlands	11.28	PB	799
14	2	4	Tim Nowak	Germany	11.31	PB	793
14	3	9	Jake Stein	Australia	11.31		793
16	1	5	James Turner	Canada	11.33	PB	789
17	2	2	Garrett Scantling	United States	11.35	PB	784
18	1	3	Luca Di Tizio	Switzerland	11.42	PB	769
19	1	6	Manuel A. González	Cuba	11.48	PB	757
20	3	7	Dino Dodig	Serbia	11.49		755
21	2	9	Aleh Kopach	Belarus	11.51		750
22	2	6	Jorge Ureña	Spain	11.54	PB	744
23	2	5	Arne Broeders	Belgium	11.58	PB	736

=== Long jump ===
Rank	Group	Name	Nationality	#1	#2	#3	Result	Notes	Points
1	B	Cedric Dubler	Australia	7.22	7.47	7.45	7.47	PB	927
2	B	Jake Stein	Australia	7.27	7.41	7.26	7.41	PB	913
3	A	Benjamin Gföhler	Switzerland	x	6.92	7.38	7.38	PB	905
4	B	Lukas Schmitz	Germany	7.12	6.99	7.34	7.34	PB	896
5	A	Ruben Gado	France	7.31	7.24	x	7.31	PB	888
6	B	Pieter Braun	Netherlands	7.05	7.25	7.05	7.25		874
7	B	Manuel A. González	Cuba	6.97	7.23	7.15	7.23	PB	869
8	A	Tim Dekker	Netherlands	7.23	7.14	-	7.23	PB	869
9	B	Karl Robert Saluri	Estonia	7.21	x	7.19	7.21	PB	864
10	B	Gunnar Nixon	United States	7.12	x	x	7.12		842
11	B	Abdel Kader Larrinaga	Cuba	7.05	7.08	x	7.08	PB	833
12	A	Felipe dos Santos	Brazil	6.98	7.06	7.00	7.06	PB	828
13	A	Luca Di Tizio	Switzerland	6.77	7.02	6.75	7.02	PB	818
14	A	Juuso Hassi	Finland	6.70	7.01	x	7.01	PB	816
15	A	Arne Broeders	Belgium	6.75	6.61	6.96	6.96		804
16	B	Aleh Kopach	Belarus	6.88	6.79	x	6.88		785
17	B	Dino Dodig	Serbia	6.59	6.88	6.65	6.88		785
18	A	James Turner	Canada	6.58	6.37	6.87	6.87	PB	783
19	B	Markus Leemet	Estonia	x	x	6.87	6.87		783
20	B	Jorge Ureña	Spain	6.56	6.76	6.64	6.76		757
21	A	Vacláv Sedlák	Czech Republic	6.61	6.60	6.73	6.73	SB	750
22	A	Tim Nowak	Germany	6.49	6.50	6.70	6.70	PB	743
23	A	Garrett Scantling	United States	6.61	x	6.59	6.61		723

=== Shot put ===
Rank	Group	Name	Nationality	#1	#2	#3	Result	Notes	Points
1	A	Jake Stein	Australia	16.19	16.39	x	16.39		875
2	A	Pieter Braun	Netherlands	14.63	14.30	15.47	15.47	PB	819
3	A	Tim Nowak	Germany	13.57	14.89	x	14.89	PB	783
4	A	Manuel A. González	Cuba	14.46	14.59	14.78	14.78		776
5	A	Tim Dekker	Netherlands	13.63	14.68	13.97	14.68		770
6	A	Gunnar Nixon	United States	14.30	x	14.54	14.54	PB	761
7	A	Garrett Scantling	United States	x	13.45	14.47	14.47	PB	757
8	A	Felipe dos Santos	Brazil	12.43	14.44	10.21	14.44		755
9	A	Karl Robert Saluri	Estonia	13.78	x	14.20	14.20		741
10	A	Vacláv Sedlák	Czech Republic	13.99	x	x	13.99	PB	728
11	A	Abdel Kader Larrinaga	Cuba	12.57	13.93	13.90	13.93		724
12	B	Juuso Hassi	Finland	13.53	x	x	13.53		700
13	A	Arne Broeders	Belgium	13.37	13.16	13.02	13.37		690
14	B	Lukas Schmitz	Germany	12.59	12.75	12.52	12.75	SB	652
15	B	Benjamin Gföhler	Switzerland	12.23	12.68	11.87	12.68		648
16	B	Markus Leemet	Estonia	10.97	9.33	12.65	12.65		646
17	B	James Turner	Canada	12.53	x	x	12.53	PB	639
18	B	Ruben Gado	France	12.42	11.75	11.13	12.42	PB	632
19	B	Cedric Dubler	Australia	12.35	12.19	12.15	12.35	PB	628
20	B	Aleh Kopach	Belarus	12.04	11.27	12.24	12.24		632
21	B	Dino Dodig	Serbia	x	11.57	12.02	12.02		608
22	B	Luca Di Tizio	Switzerland	11.36	11.25	11.88	11.88	PB	599
23	B	Jorge Ureña	Spain	11.58	x	x	11.58		581

=== High jump ===
Rank	Group	Name	Nationality	1.68	1.71	1.74	1.77	1.80	1.83	1.86	1.89	1.92	1.95	1.98	2.01	2.04	2.07	2.10	2.13	Result	Notes	Points
1	A	Gunnar Nixon	United States	-	-	-	-	-	-	-	-	o	-	o	o	xo	xxo	o	xxx	2.10		896
2	B	Cedric Dubler	Australia	-	-	-	-	-	-	-	-	-	o	-	o	xxo	o	xxx		2.07		868
3	A	Tim Dekker	Netherlands	-	-	-	-	-	-	-	-	o	xo	o	o	xo	xxx			2.04	PB	840
4	A	Garrett Scantling	United States	-	-	-	-	-	-	-	-	xo	o	-	o	xxx				2.01		813
5	A	Abdel Kader Larrinaga	Cuba	-	-	-	-	-	-	-	-	o	o	o	xo	xxx				2.01		813
6	B	Aleh Kopach	Belarus	-	-	-	-	-	o	o	o	o	xxo	o	xo	xxx				2.01	PB	813
7	A	Manuel A. González	Cuba	-	-	-	-	-	-	o	o	xo	xo	xo	xo	xxx				2.01	PB	813
8	A	Tim Nowak	Germany	-	-	-	o	-	o	o	o	o	o	xo	xxx					1.98	PB	785
9	B	Dino Dodig	Serbia	-	-	-	-	o	-	o	-	o	o	xxo	xxx					1.98	PB	785
10	A	Jake Stein	Australia	-	-	-	-	-	-	-	o	-	o	xxx						1.95		758
11	B	Luca Di Tizio	Switzerland	-	-	-	o	-	o	o	o	o	xo	xxx						1.95	PB	758
12	A	Pieter Braun	Netherlands	-	-	-	-	-	-	-	xo	o	xo	xxx						1.95		758
13	A	Vacláv Sedlák	Czech Republic	-	-	-	-	o	o	o	o	xo	xxx							1.92		731
14	B	Jorge Ureña	Spain	-	-	-	xo	-	xxo	o	xxo	xxo	xxx							1.92	PB	731
15	A	Felipe dos Santos	Brazil	-	-	-	xo	o	xxo	xo	xxx									1.86	PB	679
16	B	Juuso Hassi	Finland	-	o	-	o	o	o	xxo	xxx									1.86	PB	679
16	B	Lukas Schmitz	Germany	-	-	-	o	-	o	xxo	xxx									1.86		679
18	B	James Turner	Canada	-	xo	-	o	xo	o	xxo	xxx									1.86	SB	679
19	A	Karl Robert Saluri	Estonia	-	-	o	xo	o	o	xxx										1.83	PB	653
20	A	Arne Broeders	Belgium	-	-	-	o	o	xxo	xxx										1.83		653
21	B	Markus Leemet	Estonia	-	o	o	o	o	xxx											1.80		627
22	B	Benjamin Gföhler	Switzerland	o	xo	o	o	xxo	xxx											1.80		627
23	B	Ruben Gado	France	-	xxo	xo	xxx													1.74		577

=== 400 metres ===
Rank	Heat	Lane	Name	Nationality	Time	Notes	Points
1	3	3	Lukas Schmitz	Germany	47.73		922
2	3	8	Gunnar Nixon	United States	49.13		855
3	2	3	Ruben Gado	France	49.21	PB	851
4	2	5	Karl Robert Saluri	Estonia	49.60	PB	833
5	3	7	Cedric Dubler	Australia	49.70		828
5	3	2	Tim Dekker	Netherlands	49.70		828
7	2	2	Markus Leemet	Estonia	49.80	PB	824
8	2	7	Aleh Kopach	Belarus	49.87	PB	821
9	2	9	James Turner	Canada	49.90	PB	819
10	3	5	Vacláv Sedlák	Czech Republic	50.08		811
11	3	4	Benjamin Gföhler	Switzerland	50.20		805
12	3	6	Dino Dodig	Serbia	50.31		800
12	1	2	Juuso Hassi	Finland	50.31	SB	800
14	1	5	Felipe dos Santos	Brazil	50.38	SB	797
15	3	9	Pieter Braun	Netherlands	50.60		787
16	2	8	Tim Nowak	Germany	50.81		778
17	1	8	Abdel Kader Larrinaga	Cuba	51.00	PB	769
18	2	6	Luca Di Tizio	Switzerland	51.03		768
19	1	7	Jake Stein	Australia	51.15	PB	762
20	2	4	Arne Broeders	Belgium	51.37		753
21	1	6	Jorge Ureña	Spain	51.79	PB	734
22	1	4	Manuel A. González	Cuba	52.26	PB	713
	1	3	Garrett Scantling	United States	DSQ		0

=== 110 metres hurdles ===
Rank	Heat	Lane	Name	Nationality	Time	Notes	Points
1	3	8	Tim Dekker	Netherlands	14.02		972
2	3	5	Vacláv Sedlák	Czech Republic	14.09		963
3	3	2	Gunnar Nixon	United States	14.54		906
4	3	6	Abdel Kader Larrinaga	Cuba	14.58		901
4	3	7	Jorge Ureña	Spain	14.58		901
6	3	3	Cedric Dubler	Australia	14.62		896
7	3	4	Pieter Braun	Netherlands	14.69		887
8	1	6	Felipe dos Santos	Brazil	14.70	PB	886
9	2	7	Tim Nowak	Germany	14.87	PB	865
10	3	9	Jake Stein	Australia	14.90		862
11	1	7	Ruben Gado	France	14.92	PB	859
12	2	5	Lukas Schmitz	Germany	14.96	PB	854
13	2	8	Luca Di Tizio	Switzerland	15.00		850
14	1	9	Manuel A. González	Cuba	15.07	PB	841
15	2	9	Markus Leemet	Estonia	15.14		833
16	2	4	Aleh Kopach	Belarus	15.21		824
17	2	6	Dino Dodig	Serbia	15.23		822
18	1	2	Arne Broeders	Belgium	15.48	PB	792
19	1	3	Karl Robert Saluri	Estonia	15.51		789
20	1	5	James Turner	Canada	15.58	PB	781
21	2	3	Benjamin Gföhler	Switzerland	15.68	SB	769
	1	8	Juuso Hassi	Finland	DSQ		0
	1	4	Garrett Scantling	United States	DNS		0

=== Discus throw ===
Rank	Group	Name	Nationality	#1	#2	#3	Result	Notes	Points
1	B	Jake Stein	Australia	46.93	51.43	51.22	51.43		900
2	A	Juuso Hassi	Finland	41.15	44.86	x	44.86	SB	764
3	B	Pieter Braun	Netherlands	44.24	43.26	42.14	44.24	PB	751
4	A	Tim Dekker	Netherlands	43.69	42.60	x	43.69	PB	740
5	B	Tim Nowak	Germany	40.10	42.57	x	42.57	PB	717
6	B	Gunnar Nixon	United States	39.43	41.38	42.23	42.23	PB	710
7	A	James Turner	Canada	37.97	42.16	40.70	42.16	PB	709
8	B	Felipe dos Santos	Brazil	32.01	x	41.27	41.27		690
9	B	Arne Broeders	Belgium	39.48	36.17	40.02	40.02		665
10	B	Ruben Gado	France	39.54	37.26	x	39.54		655
11	B	Karl Robert Saluri	Estonia	39.30	38.33	x	39.30		650
12	A	Markus Leemet	Estonia	38.52	38.83	35.84	38.83	PB	641
13	A	Benjamin Gföhler	Switzerland	35.63	38.48	32.88	38.48	PB	634
14	B	Dino Dodig	Serbia	35.59	38.26	35.24	38.26		629
15	B	Manuel A. González	Cuba	37.68	37.02	x	37.68		618
16	A	Vacláv Sedlák	Czech Republic	x	37.34	37.11	37.34		611
17	B	Abdel Kader Larrinaga	Cuba	x	x	37.00	37.00		604
18	A	Lukas Schmitz	Germany	36.93	x	x	36.93	SB	602
19	A	Luca Di Tizio	Switzerland	32.20	36.58	x	36.58	PB	595
20	A	Cedric Dubler	Australia	36.15	x	x	36.15		587
21	A	Aleh Kopach	Belarus	22.97	33.95	35.91	35.91	PB	582
22	A	Jorge Ureña	Spain	34.86	35.56	x	35.56		575
	B	Garrett Scantling	United States				DNS		0

=== Pole vault ===
Rank	Group	Name	Nationality	3.30	3.40	3.50	3.60	3.70	3.80	3.90	4.00	4.10	4.20	4.30	4.40	4.50	4.60	4.70	4.80	Result	Notes	Points
1	B	Ruben Gado	France	-	-	-	-	-	-	-	-	-	-	-	-	xxo	xo	o	xxx	4.70		819
2	B	Luca Di Tizio	Switzerland	-	-	-	-	-	-	-	-	-	o	o	o	o	xxx			4.50	PB	760
3	B	Karl Robert Saluri	Estonia	-	-	-	-	-	-	-	-	-	xo	o	o	o	xxx			4.50	PB	760
4	B	Gunnar Nixon	United States	-	-	-	-	-	-	-	-	-	o	o	o	xxo	xxx			4.50		760
4	B	Cedric Dubler	Australia	-	-	-	-	-	-	-	-	-	o	-	o	xxo	xxx			4.50		760
6	A	Arne Broeders	Belgium	-	-	-	-	-	-	-	o	-	o	xo	xxo	xxo	xxx			4.50	PB	760
7	B	Lukas Schmitz	Germany	-	-	-	-	-	-	-	o	-	xo	o	o	xxx				4.40	SB	731
8	B	Juuso Hassi	Finland	-	-	-	-	-	-	-	xo	-	xo	xxo	xo	xx				4.40	SB	731
9	A	Aleh Kopach	Belarus	-	-	-	-	-	-	-	o	xxo	o	xo	xxx					4.30	PB	702
10	B	Manuel A. González	Cuba	-	-	-	-	-	o	-	xo	xo	o	xxo	xxx					4.30		702
11	A	Tim Dekker	Netherlands	-	-	-	-	-	-	-	xo	xxo	o	xxx						4.20		673
12	B	Vacláv Sedlák	Czech Republic	-	-	-	-	-	-	-	-	-	xo	xxx						4.20		673
13	A	Jorge Ureña	Spain	-	-	o	-	xo	-	xo	o	o	xxx							4.10	PB	645
14	A	Markus Leemet	Estonia	-	-	-	-	xo	o	o	xxx									3.90		590
15	A	Tim Nowak	Germany	-	-	-	o	-	o	xxx										3.80		562
16	A	Benjamin Gföhler	Switzerland	xo	-	-	xo	-	o	-										3.80		562
17	A	Jake Stein	Australia	-	o	-	o	-	xo	xxx										3.80		562
17	A	Felipe dos Santos	Brazil	-	-	-	-	-	xo	-	xxx									3.80		562
17	A	Dino Dodig	Serbia	-	-	-	o	-	xo	xxx										3.80	PB	562
20	A	Abdel Kader Larrinaga	Cuba	-	-	o	x-	xx												3.50		482
21	A	James Turner	Canada	xo	xo	xo	xxx													3.50	PB	482
	B	Pieter Braun	Netherlands	-	-	-	-	-	-	-	-	-	xxx							NM		0
	B	Garrett Scantling	United States																	DNS		0

=== Javelin throw ===
Rank	Group	Name	Nationality	#1	#2	#3	Result	Notes	Points
1	A	Jake Stein	Australia	60.14	x	69.61	69.61	PB	883
2	B	Arne Broeders	Belgium	57.62	57.08	56.04	57.62		702
3	B	Gunnar Nixon	United States	54.28	56.25	x	56.25		682
4	A	Manuel A. González	Cuba	48.55	49.99	55.89	55.89		676
5	B	Karl Robert Saluri	Estonia	51.55	50.86	55.80	55.80	PB	675
6	A	Pieter Braun	Netherlands	55.51	53.21	50.88	55.51		671
7	B	Luca Di Tizio	Switzerland	x	54.11	53.01	54.11		650
8	A	Tim Nowak	Germany	53.56	52.32	53.85	53.85		646
9	B	Cedric Dubler	Australia	48.35	44.11	50.59	50.59	PB	597
10	A	James Turner	Canada	49.01	x	50.54	50.54		597
11	A	Abdel Kader Larrinaga	Cuba	50.41	48.07	47.77	50.41		595
12	B	Ruben Gado	France	45.41	50.40	49.53	50.40	PB	595
13	A	Markus Leemet	Estonia	49.90	x	47.00	49.90	PB	587
14	A	Felipe dos Santos	Brazil	49.52	43.40	49.09	49.52		581
15	B	Jorge Ureña	Spain	48.01	45.24	48.64	48.64	PB	568
16	B	Tim Dekker	Netherlands	42.41	40.76	48.04	48.04	PB	560
17	A	Lukas Schmitz	Germany	46.28	46.53	x	46.53	SB	537
18	A	Dino Dodig	Serbia	44.66	44.62	42.58	44.66		510
19	B	Aleh Kupach	Belarus	44.51	x	39.69	44.51		508
20	B	Benjamin Gföhler	Switzerland	41.15	39.00	40.10	41.15		459
21	A	Vacláv Sedlák	Czech Republic	37.99	x	39.16	39.16		430
	B	Juuso Hassi	Finland				DNS		0

=== 1500 metres ===
Rank	Heat	Order	Name	Nationality	Time	Notes	Points
1	2	2	Gunnar Nixon	United States	4:22.36	PB	796
2	2	8	Ruben Gado	France	4:24.00	PB	784
3	2	5	Karl Robert Saluri	Estonia	4:26.69	PB	766
4	2	6	Manuel A. González	Cuba	4:29.44	PB	748
5	1	6	James Turner	Canada	4:30.83	PB	739
6	1	8	Dino Dodig	Serbia	4:30.97	PB	738
7	2	11	Luca Di Tizio	Switzerland	4:31.47	PB	735
8	1	3	Aleh Kopach	Belarus	4:32.85	PB	726
9	2	3	Tim Dekker	Netherlands	4:34.34	PB	716
10	2	7	Lukas Schmitz	Germany	4:35.38	PB	710
11	1	10	Arne Broeders	Belgium	4:35.45	PB	709
12	1	5	Pieter Braun	Netherlands	4:35.51		709
13	1	9	Jorge Ureña	Spain	4:36.68		701
14	1	1	Abdel Kader Larrinaga	Cuba	4:37.60	PB	695
15	2	9	Tim Nowak	Germany	4:39.36	PB	684
16	1	2	Vacláv Sedlák	Czech Republic	4:39.98	PB	680
17	1	4	Markus Leemet	Estonia	4:40.32	PB	678
18	2	10	Felipe dos Santos	Brazil	4:43.75	PB	657
19	2	1	Jake Stein	Australia	4:45.35	PB	647
20	2	4	Cedric Dubler	Australia	4:46.05	PB	643
21	1	7	Benjamin Gföhler	Switzerland	5:25.79		420

=== Standings ===
Rank	Name	Nationality	Points	Notes
1st place, gold medalist(s)	Gunnar Nixon	United States	8018	WJL
2nd place, silver medalist(s)	Jake Stein	Australia	7955	AJ
3rd place, bronze medalist(s)	Tim Dekker	Netherlands	7815	PB
4	Cedric Dubler	Australia	7584	PB
5	Karl Robert Saluri	Estonia	7583	NJ
6	Manuel A. González	Cuba	7513	
7	Ruben Gado	France	7498	PB
8	Lukas Schmitz	Germany	7444	PB
9	Tim Nowak	Germany	7356	PB
10	Luca Di Tizio	Switzerland	7302	PB
11	Felipe dos Santos	Brazil	7280	PB
12	Arne Broeders	Belgium	7264	PB
13	Abdel Kader Larrinaga	Cuba	7233	
14	Vacláv Sedlák	Czech Republic	7209	
15	Aleh Kopach	Belarus	7132	
16	Pieter Braun	Netherlands	7055	
17	Markus Leemet	Estonia	7050	
18	James Turner	Canada	7017	PB
19	Dino Dodig	Serbia	6994	
20	Jorge Ureña	Spain	6937	PB
21	Benjamin Gföhler	Switzerland	6690	
	Juuso Hassi	Finland	DNF	
	Garrett Scantling	United States	DNF	

== Participation ==
According to an unofficial count, 23 athletes from 16 countries participated in the event.

- Australia (2)
- Belarus (1)
- Belgium (1)
- Brazil (1)
- Canada (1)
- Cuba (2)
- Czech Republic (1)
- Estonia (2)
- Finland (1)
- France (1)
- Germany (2)
- Netherlands (2)
- Serbia (1)
- Spain (1)
- Switzerland (2)
- United States (2)
