= 2025 World Athletics Indoor Championships – Men's heptathlon =

International sporting competition

Men's heptathlon at the 2025 World Athletics Indoor Championships
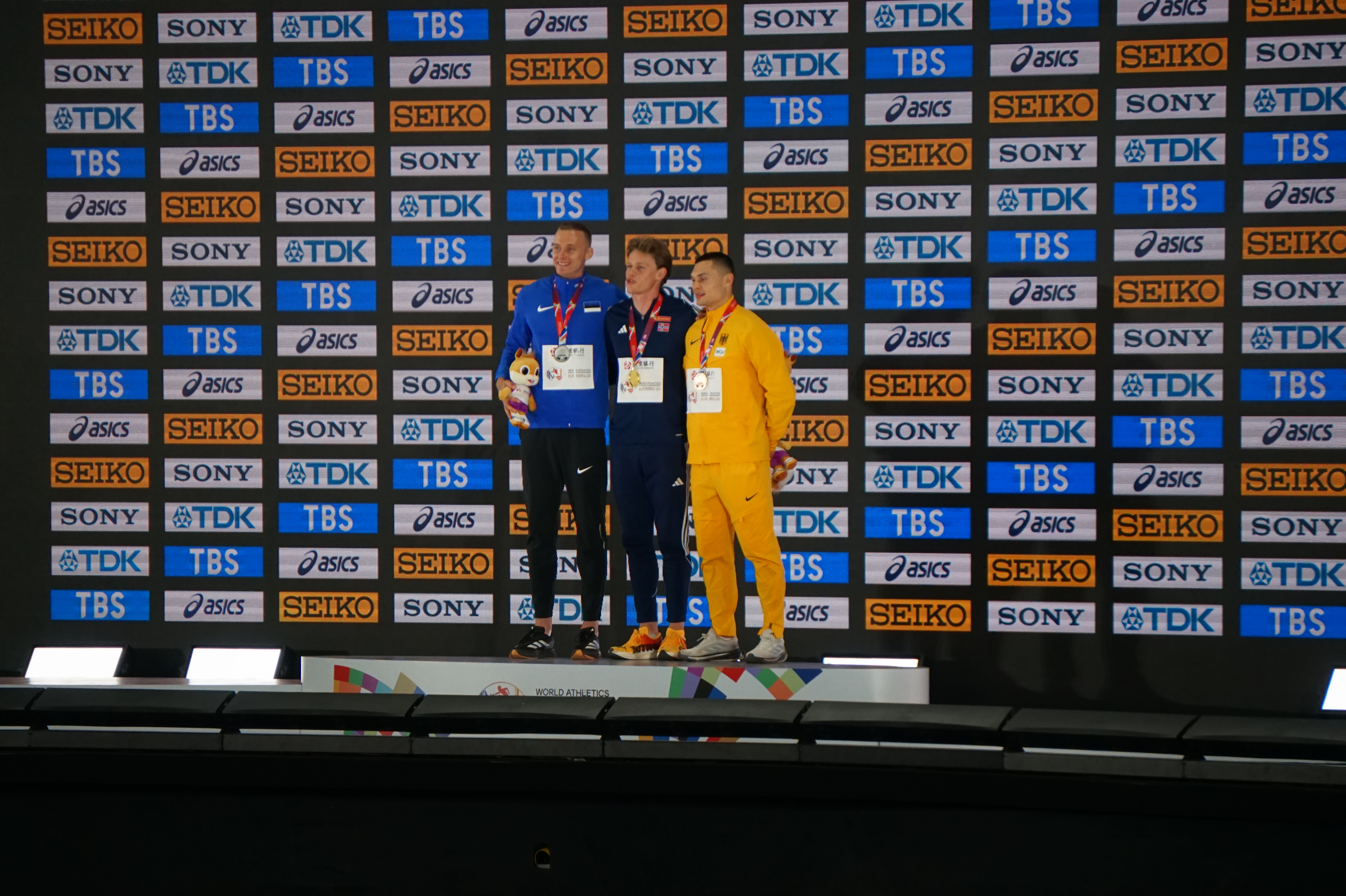
- The medalists in the event.
- Venue: Nanjing's Cube at Nanjing Youth Olympic Sports Park
- Dates: 22–23 March
- Competitors: 12 from 8 nations
- Winning points: 6475

Medalists
gold medal	Sander Skotheim	Norway
silver medal	Johannes Erm	Estonia
bronze medal	Till Steinforth	Germany

The men's heptathlon at the 2025 World Athletics Indoor Championships took place on the short track of the Nanjing's Cube at Nanjing Youth Olympic Sports Park in Nanjing, China, from 22 to 23 March 2025.. This was the 17th time the event was contested at the World Athletics Indoor Championships. Athletes could qualify by achieving the entry standard or by their World Athletics Ranking in the event.

The 60 metres, long jump, shot put, and high jump took place on 21 March during the morning session. The 60 metres hurdles, pole vault, and 1000 metres took place on 21 March during the evening session.

== Background ==
The men's heptathlon was contested 16 times before 2025, at every edition of the World Athletics Indoor Championships since 1993.

Records before the 2025 World Athletics Indoor Championships
Record	Athlete (nation)	Score (pts)	Location	Date
World record	Ashton Eaton (USA)	6645	Istanbul, Turkey	9-10 March 2012
Championship record	Ashton Eaton (USA)	6645	Istanbul, Turkey	9-10 March 2012
World leading	Sander Skotheim (NOR)	6558	Apeldoorn, Netherlands	8 March 2025

== Results ==
=== 60 metres ===
The 60 metres was started at 10:04.

Place	Heat	Athlete	Nation	Time	Points	Notes
1	2	Till Steinforth	Germany	6.82	947	
2	1	Harrison Williams	United States	6.90	918	PB
3	2	Johannes Erm	Estonia	6.94	904	SB
4	1	José Fernando Ferreira	Brazil	6.94	904	SB
5	2	Vilém Stráský	Czech Republic	6.95	900	
6	2	Pedro de Oliveira	Brazil	6.96	897	
7	2	Sander Skotheim	Norway	6.97	893	
8	2	Zsombor Gálpál	Hungary	7.01	879	
9	1	Heath Baldwin	United States	7.04	868	SB
10	1	Yuma Maruyama	Japan	7.04	868	PB
11	1	Risto Lillemets	Estonia	7.06	861	
12	1	Tim Nowak	Germany	7.25	796	

=== Long jump ===
The long jump was started at 10:48.

Place	Name	Nation	#1	#2	#3	Result	Points	Notes	Total
1	Sander Skotheim	Norway	x	8.00	7.65	8.00	1061		1954
2	Johannes Erm	Estonia	7.60	7.77	7.58	7.77	1002	SB	1906
3	Till Steinforth	Germany	7.41	7.61	7.59	7.61	962		1909
4	José Fernando Ferreira	Brazil	7.06	7.34	7.00	7.34	896		1800
5	Pedro de Oliveira	Brazil	6.86	7.20	7.15	7.20	862		1759
6	Tim Nowak	Germany	6.92	7.20	7.00	7.20	862	SB	1658
7	Heath Baldwin	United States	7.19	x	7.00	7.19	859		1727
8	Vilém Stráský	Czech Republic	7.03	x	7.10	7.10	838		1738
9	Harrison Williams	United States	7.10	x	6.80	7.10	838	SB	1756
10	Yuma Maruyama	Japan	6.90	x	6.93	6.93	797		1665
11	Risto Lillemets	Estonia	x	6.86	x	6.86	781	SB	1642
12	Zsombor Gálpál	Hungary	6.62	6.49	6.62	6.62	725	1604	

=== Shot put ===
The shot put was started at 12:10.

Place	Name	Nation	#1	#2	#3	Result	Points	Notes	Total
1	Heath Baldwin	United States	15.59	15.37	16.00	16.00	851	SB	2578
2	Zsombor Gálpál	Hungary	15.63	14.28	15.27	15.63	828		2432
3	Harrison Williams	United States	14.50	14.96	15.49	15.49	820		2576
4	Johannes Erm	Estonia	14.99	x	15.27	15.27	806		2712
5	Tim Nowak	Germany	14.73	14.27	14.50	14.73	773		2431
6	Vilém Stráský	Czech Republic	14.50	14.47	14.71	14.71	772	SB	2510
7	Sander Skotheim	Norway	14.68	14.41	14.57	14.68	770		2724
8	Risto Lillemets	Estonia	x	14.64	14.34	14.64	768		2410
9	José Fernando Ferreira	Brazil	13.60	14.50	14.21	14.50	759		2559
10	Till Steinforth	Germany	12.83	14.36	14.14	14.36	750		2659
11	Yuma Maruyama	Japan	13.80	x	14.17	14.17	739	SB	2404
12	Pedro de Oliveira	Brazil	12.56	13.19	13.61	13.61	704		2463

=== High jump ===
The high jump was started at 18:37.

Place	Name	Nation	1.77	1.80	1.83	1.86	1.89	1.92	1.95	1.98	2.01	2.04	2.07	2.10	2.13	2.16	Result	Points	Notes	Total
1	Sander Skotheim	Norway	–	–	–	–	–	–	–	o	–	xo	o	xxo	o	xxx	2.13	925		3649
2	Heath Baldwin	United States	–	–	–	–	–	–	o	–	o	o	o	xo	xo	xxx	2.13	925	SB	3503
3	Till Steinforth	Germany	–	–	–	–	o	o	o	o	xxo	xxx					2.01	813	SB	3472
4	Johannes Erm	Estonia	–	–	–	o	–	o	o	xo	xxx						1.98	785		3497
5	Risto Lillemets	Estonia	–	–	–	–	o	o	o	xxx							1.95	758		3168
6	Vilém Stráský	Czech Republic	–	–	–	xo	o	xo	o	xxx							1.95	758		3268
7	Tim Nowak	Germany	–	–	–	–	–	xo	xxo	xxx							1.95	758		3558
8	Yuma Maruyama	Japan	–	–	–	o	o	xo	xxx								1.92	731		3135
9	José Fernando Ferreira	Brazil	–	o	–	o	xo	xo	xxx								1.92	731		3290
10	Harrison Williams	United States	–	–	–	xo	xxo	xxo	xr								1.92	731	SB	3307
11	Pedro de Oliveira	Brazil	–	o	–	xxo	xxo	xxx									1.89	705	SB	3168
12	Zsombor Gálpál	Hungary	o	xo	xo	xxo	xxx										1.86	679		3111

=== 60 metres hurdles ===
The 60 metres hurdles was started at 10:04.

Place	Heat	Athlete	Nation	Time	Points	Notes	Total
1	2	Till Steinforth	Germany	7.85	1020		4492
2	2	Vilém Stráský	Czech Republic	7.87	1015	PB	4283
3	2	Johannes Erm	Estonia	7.91	1005	PB	4502
4	2	Sander Skotheim	Norway	7.93	999	PB	4648
5	2	Yuma Maruyama	Japan	7.93	999	PB	4134
6	2	José Fernando Ferreira	Brazil	7.96	992		4282
7	1	Heath Baldwin	United States	7.99	984	SB	4487
8	1	Pedro de Oliveira	Brazil	8.04	972	PB	4140
9	1	Zsombor Gálpál	Hungary	8.19	935		4046
10	1	Risto Lillemets	Estonia	8.23	925		4093
11	1	Tim Nowak	Germany	8.24	922		4111
12	1	Harrison Williams	United States	8.50	860	SB	4167

=== Pole vault ===
The pole vault was started at 11:31.

Place	Name	Nation	3.70	3.80	3.90	4.00	4.10	4.20	4.30	4.40	4.50	4.60	4.70	4.80	4.90	5.00	5.10	5.20	5.30	5.40	5.50	Result	Points	Notes	Total
1	Johannes Erm	Estonia	–	–	–	–	–	–	–	–	–	–	–	xo	o	o	o	xo	xxo	–	xxx	5.30	1004	SB	5506
2	Till Steinforth	Germany	–	–	–	–	–	–	–	–	–	–	–	o	o	xo	o	o	xxx			5.20	972	SB	5464
3	José Fernando Ferreira	Brazil	–	–	–	–	–	–	–	–	o	–	xxo	–	o	xxo	o	xo	xxx			5.20	972	PB	5254
4	Vilém Stráský	Czech Republic	–	–	–	–	–	–	–	o	–	o	o	xo	xo	o	xxx					5.00	910	PB	5193
5	Tim Nowak	Germany	–	–	–	–	–	–	–	–	–	–	o	o	o	xxo	xxx					5.00	910		5021
6	Sander Skotheim	Norway	–	–	–	–	–	–	–	–	–	xo	o	o	o	xxo	xxx					5.00	910		5558
7	Risto Lillemets	Estonia	–	–	–	–	–	–	–	–	–	–	xo	xo	o	xxx						4.90	880		4973
8	Heath Baldwin	United States	–	–	–	–	–	–	xo	o	o	–	o	xo	xxx							4.80	849		5336
9	Yuma Maruyama	Japan	–	–	–	–	–	–	–	–	xo	o	o	xxo	xxx							4.80	849		4983
10	Zsombor Gálpál	Hungary	–	–	–	–	–	o	xxx													4.20	673		4719
11	Pedro de Oliveira	Brazil	o	–	xxx																	3.70	535		4675
	Harrison Williams	United States	–	–	–	–	–	–	–	–	–	–	–	–	r							NM	0		4167

=== 1000 metres ===
The 1000 metres was started at 20:02.

Place	Athlete	Nation	Time	Points	Notes	Total
1	Johannes Erm	Estonia	2:34.91	931		6437
2	Sander Skotheim	Norway	2:36.08	917		6475
3	Tim Nowak	Germany	2:36.36	914		5935
4	Vilém Stráský	Czech Republic	2:36.65	911		6104
5	Risto Lillemets	Estonia	2:38.23	893		5866
6	Heath Baldwin	United States	2:41.95	852	PB	6188
7	Pedro de Oliveira	Brazil	2:44.04	829	PB	5504
8	Zsombor Gálpál	Hungary	2:44.09	829	PB	5548
9	Yuma Maruyama	Japan	2:44.54	824	PB	5807
10	Till Steinforth	Germany	2:45.69	811		6275
11	José Fernando Ferreira	Brazil	2:50.93	756	PB	6010
	Harrison Williams	United States	DNS	0		DNF

== Overall results ==
After all events.

Key

The highest mark recorded in each event is highlighted in yellow

Key:	WL	World leading performance	NR	National record	PB	Personal best	DNS	Did not start	DNF	Did not finish

Place	Athlete	Nation	Overall points	Notes	60 m	LJ	SP	HJ	60 m H	PV	1000 m
1st place, gold medalist(s)	Sander Skotheim	Norway	6475		893; 6.97	1061; 8.00 m	770; 14.68 m	925; 2.13 m	999; 7.93	910; 5.00 m	917; 2:36.08
2nd place, silver medalist(s)	Johannes Erm	Estonia	6437	NR	904; 6.94	1002; 7.77 m	806; 15.27 m	785; 1.98 m	1005; 7.91	1004; 5.30 m	931; 2:34.91
3rd place, bronze medalist(s)	Till Steinforth	Germany	6275		947; 6.82	962; 7.61 m	750; 14.36 m	813; 2.01 m	1020; 7.85	972; 5.20 m	811; 2:45.69
4	Heath Baldwin	United States	6188	SB	868; 7.04	859; 7.19 m	851; 16.00 m	925; 2.13 m	984; 7.99	849; 4.80 m	852; 2:41.95
5	Vilém Stráský	Czech Republic	6104		900; 6.95	838; 7.10 m	772; 14.71 m	758; 1.95 m	1015; 7.87	910; 5.00 m	911; 2:36.65
6	José Fernando Ferreira	Brazil	6010	AR	904; 6.94	896; 7.34 m	759; 14.50 m	731; 1.92 m	992; 7.96	972; 5.20 m	756; 2:50.93
7	Tim Nowak	Germany	5935	SB	796; 7.25	862; 7.20 m	773; 14.73 m	758; 1.95 m	922; 8.24	910; 5.00 m	910; 2:36.36
8	Risto Lillemets	Estonia	5866		861; 7.06	781; 6.86 m	768; 14.64 m	758; 1.95 m	925; 8.23	880; 4.90 m	893; 2:38.23
9	Yuma Maruyama	Japan	5807		868; 7.04	797; 6.93 m	739; 14.17 m	731; 1.92 m	999; 7.93	849; 4.80 m	824; 2:44.54
10	Zsombor Gálpál	Hungary	5548	PB	879; 7.01	725; 6.62 m	828; 15.63 m	679; 1.86 m	935; 8.19	673; 4.20 m	829; 2:44.09
11	Pedro de Oliveira	Brazil	5504		897; 6.96	862; 7.20 m	704; 13.61 m	705; 1.89 m	972; 8.04	535; 3.70 m	829; 2:44.04
	Harrison Williams	United States	DNF		918; 6.90	838; 7.10 m	820; 15.49 m	731; 1.92 m	860; 8.50	0 NM	DNS
