= Ruben Gado =

French athletics competitor

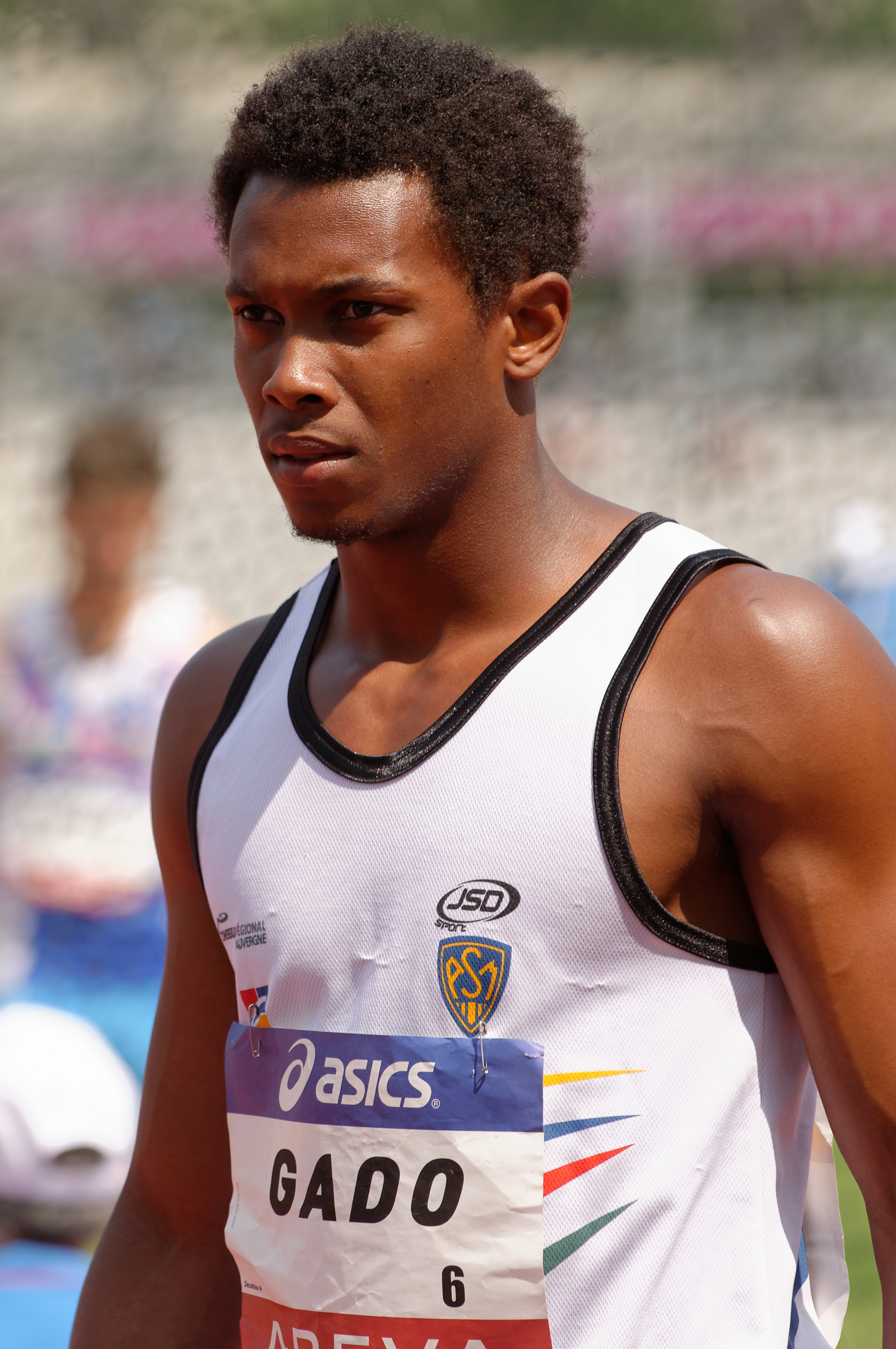
- Ruben Gado in 2013

Personal information
- Born: 13 December 1993 (age 31); Saint-Denis, Réunion
- Height: 1.80 m (5 ft 11 in)
- Weight: 75 kg (165 lb)

Sport
- Sport: Athletics
- Event: Decathlon
- Club: Clermont Athlétisme Auvergne
- Coached by: Aurelien Preteseille

Ruben Gado (born 13 December 1993 in Saint-Denis, Réunion) is a French athlete competing in the combined events. He represented his country at the 2018 World Indoor Championships finishing seventh. He earlier won a silver medal at the 2017 Jeux de la Francophonie.

== International competitions ==
Year	Competition	Venue	Position	Event	Notes
Representing France
2012	World Junior Championships	Barcelona, Spain	7th	Decathlon (junior)	7498 pts
2015	European U23 Championships	Tallinn, Estonia	–	Decathlon	DNF
2017	Jeux de la Francophonie	Abidjan, Ivory Coast	2nd	Decathlon	7839 pts
2018	World Indoor Championships	Birmingham, United Kingdom	7th	Heptathlon	5927 pts
2018	European Championships	Berlin, Germany	17th	Decathlon	7137 pts

== Personal bests ==
Outdoor

- 100 metres – 10.75 (+0.3 m/s, Talence 2018)
- 200 metres – 22.30 (-1.0 m/s, Aurillac 2018)
- 400 metres – 47.65 (Berlin 2018)
- 1500 metres – 4:20.86 (Albi 2018)
- 110 metres hurdles – 14.88 (+1.2 m/s, Albi 2018)
- High jump – 1.97 (Arona 2017)
- Pole vault – 5.32 (Arona 2016)
- Long jump – 7.43 (+1.5 m/s, Talence 2018)
- Shot put – 13.63 (Albi 2018)
- Discus throw – 39.87 (Albi 2018)
- Javelin throw – 60.34 (Aubiére 2017)
- Decathlon – 8126 (Albi 2018)

Indoor

- 60 metres – 6.97 (Aubiére 2016)
- 1000 metres – 2:36.65 (Reims 2016)
- 60 metres hurdles – 8.32 (Lyon 2015)
- High jump – 2.00 (Madrid 2018)
- Pole vault – 5.35 (Aubiére 2015)
- Long jump – 7.33 (Madrid 2018)
- Shot put – 13.61 (Birmingham 2018)
- Heptathlon – 6014 (Madrid 2018)
