= Jake Stein =

Australian rules footballer and decathlete

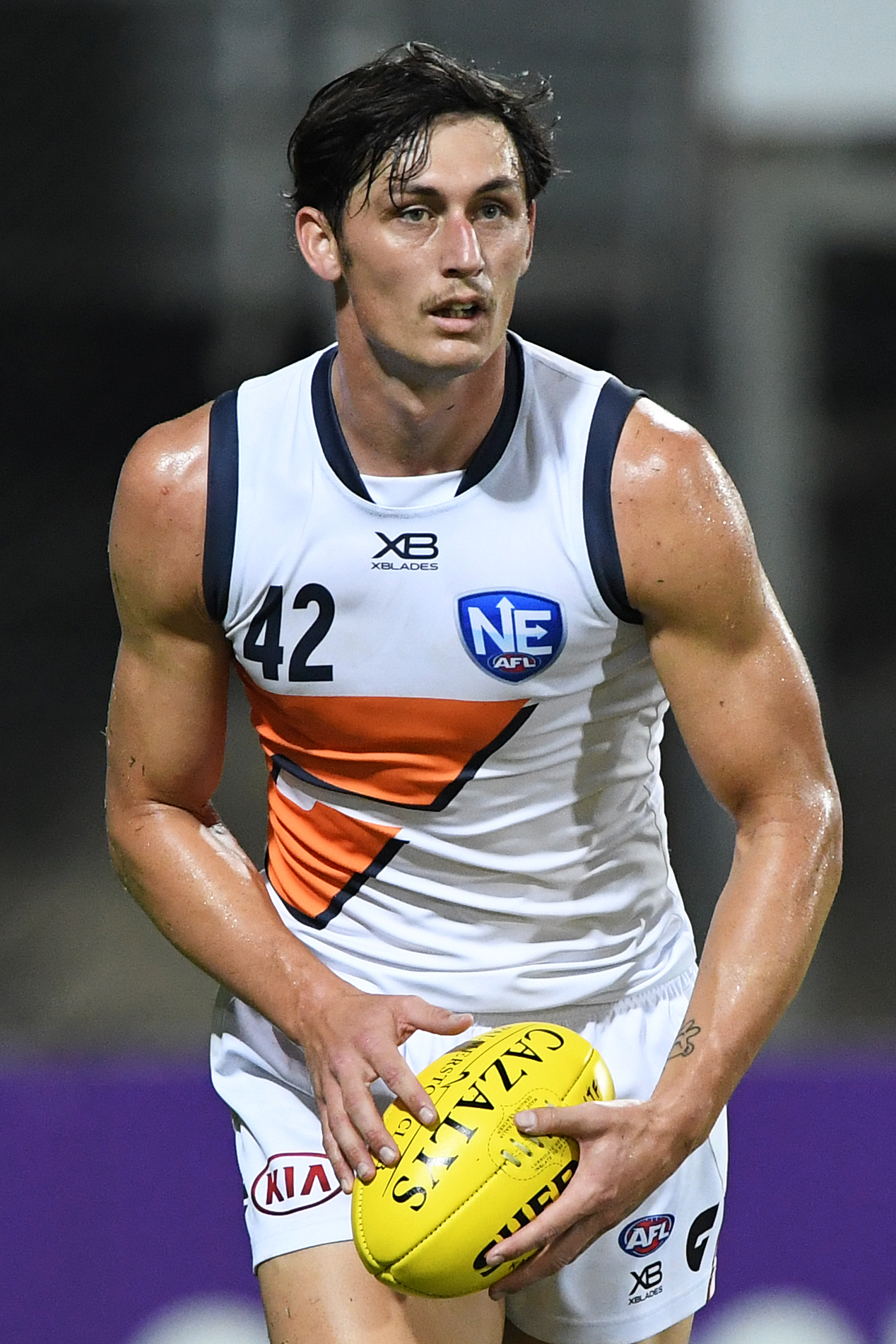
- Stein playing for Greater Western Sydney in July 2019

Personal information
- Full name: Jake Stein
- Born: 17 January 1994 (age 32); Penrith, New South Wales

Club information
- Current club: Gold Coast
- Number: 42

Playing career^{1}
Years	Club	Games (Goals)
2017–2022	Greater Western Sydney	20 (1)
2023	Gold Coast	0 (0)
Total		20 (1)
- ^{1} Playing statistics correct to the end of 2023.

Career highlights
- 2023 VFL premiership player

Jake Stein (born 17 January 1994) is a former Australian rules footballer who last played for Gold Coast in the Australian Football League (AFL) and a former track and field athlete specialising in the decathlon. He previously played for the Greater Western Sydney Giants.

In 2014 Stein won his first National open title and was chosen to represent Australia at the 2014 Commonwealth Games.

He also represented Australia at the 2011 World Youth Championships and the 2012 World Junior Championships. He finished first with a World Youth Best Performance in 2011 and finished second in 2012 behind Gunnar Nixon in a then Oceania Junior Record score of 7955 points.

== Athletic career ==
Jake Stein
Personal information
- Nationality: Australian
- Born: 17 January 1994 Penrith, New South Wales

Sport
- Country: Australia
- Sport: Athletics
- Event: Decathlon

Achievements and titles
- Personal best: Decathlon: 7601 (2014)
Medal record
Men's athletics
Representing Australia
Event	1st	2nd	3rd
World Youth Championships	1	0	0
World Junior Championships	0	1	0
Total	1	1	0
World Youth Championships
Gold medal – first place	2011 Lille	Octathlon
World Junior Championships
Silver medal – second place	2012 Barcelona	Decathlon

=== Records and rankings ===
Stein has won one National Title at the Australian National Track & Field Championships in the Decathlon and has won a handful of medals at the Australian Junior Championships in the Junior Decathlon, Shot Put, Discus Throw & 110m Hurdles.

=== Competitions ===
==== World Youth Championships ====
Stein competed in the 7th edition of the World Youth Championships in 2011. He finished 1st with a new World Youth Best Performance, setting 6 personal bests on the way to gold.

==== World Junior Championships ====
In 2012 Stein competed in the World Junior Championships. There were two men other than Stein predicted to challenge for the title, Gunnar Nixon the eventual winner and Dutch National Junior Record holder Pieter Braun. In the end it came down to the 1500m where Stein went in with the lead but unfortunately Nixon finished too strongly and captured the title with Stein finishing in Second.

== AFL career ==
In November 2016, Stein signed with the Greater Western Sydney Giants as a category B rookie.

== Statistics ==
=== Personal bests ===
Event	Performance	Venue	Date
Decathlon	7601	Canberra	1 February 2014
100 metres	11.22 (−0.7 m/s)	Sydney Olympic Park Athletic Centre	31 March 2012
Long jump	7.50m (+2.5 m/s)	Mannheim	23 June 2012
Shot put	15.01m	Sydney Olympic Park Athletic Centre	10 November 2012
High jump	2.04m	Sydney Olympic Park Athletic Centre	4 February 2011
400 metres	50.63	Hampden Park	28 July 2014
110 metres hurdles	14.85 (−1.3 m/s)	Sydney Olympic Park Athletic Centre	2 March 2014
Discus throw	50.63m	Sydney Olympic Park Athletic Centre	2 March 2014
Pole vault	4.50m	Canberra	1 February 2014
Javelin throw	69.61m	Estadi Olímpic Lluís Companys	11 July 2012
1500 metres	4:43.71	Lakeside Stadium	6 April 2014

== Achievements ==
Year	Competition	Venue	Position	Event	Notes
Representing Australia
2011	World Youth Championships	Lille, France	1st	Octathlon	6491 WYB
2012	World Junior Championships	Barcelona, Spain	2nd	Decathlon	7955
