= Harrison Williams (decathlete) =

American decathlete (born 1996)

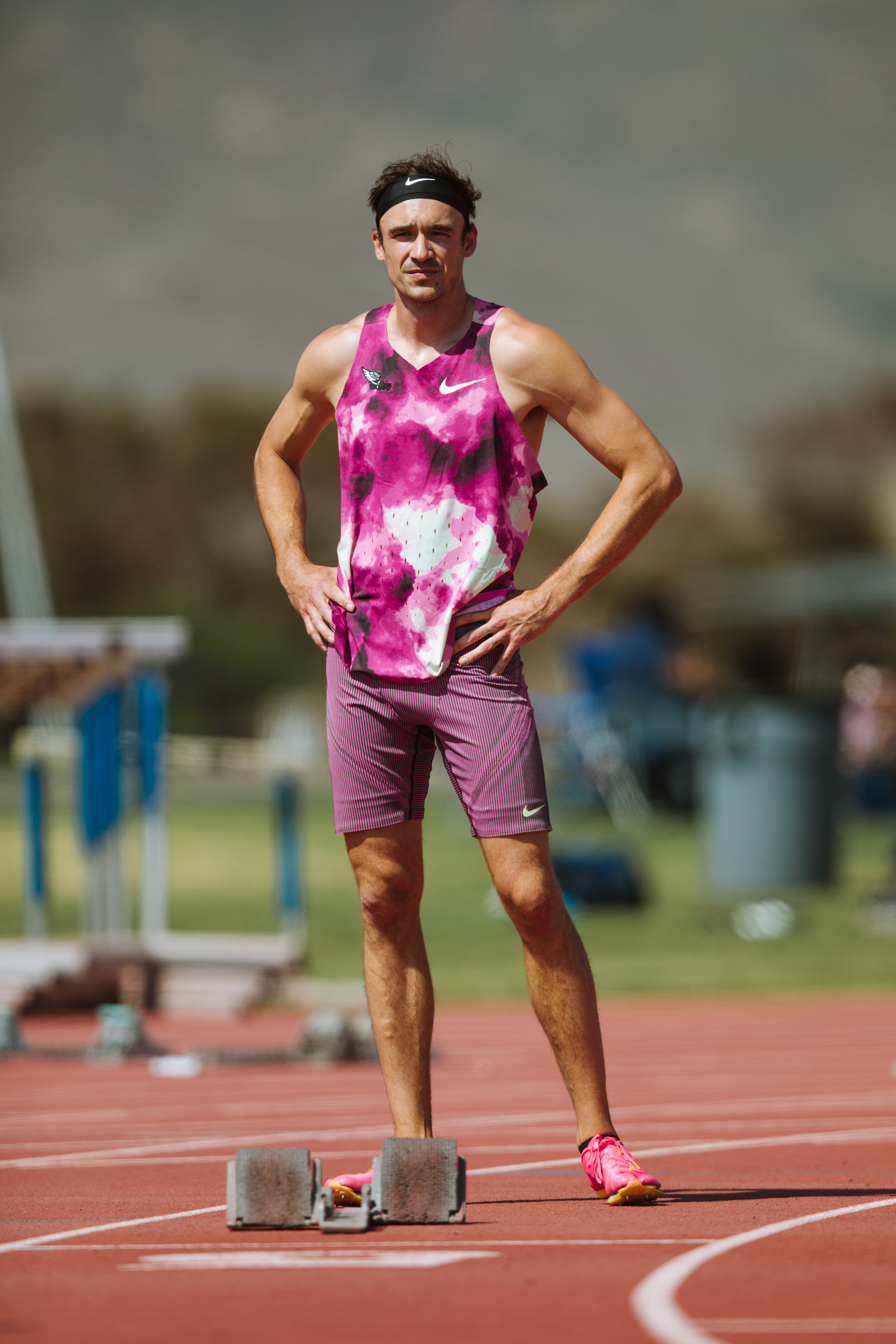
- Williams in 2024

Personal information
- Full name: Harrison Foster Williams
- Born: March 7, 1996 (age 30) Houston, Texas, U.S.
- Home town: Memphis, Tennessee, U.S.
- Education: Stanford University
- Height: 6 ft 5 in (196 cm)
- Weight: 195 lb (88 kg)

Sport
- Sport: Track and field
- Event(s): Decathlon, Heptathlon
- College team: Stanford Cardinal
- Coached by: Kris Mack

Achievements and titles
- Personal best(s): Decathlon: 8,630 (2023); Heptathlon: 6,042 (2019)
Medal record
Men's athletics
Representing the United States
Pan American U20 Athletics Championships
Gold medal – first place	2015 Edmonton	Decathlon

Harrison Foster Williams (born March 7, 1996) is an American athlete and former U.S. Champion in the decathlon.

In 2019, he participated at the World Athletics Championships, finishing 14th. In 2023, Williams set a new lifetime best of 8630 points to win the 2023 USA Outdoor Track and Field Championships and become U.S. Champion in the decathlon for the first time. This score also put him 31st on the global all-time list and booked his place at the 2023 World Athletics Championships, where he finished 7th.

In 2024, Harrison came 3rd at the 2024 United States Olympic track and field trials, thereby securing his first Olympic berth and a spot on Team USA for the 2024 Olympics.

== International competitions ==
Year	Competition	Venue	Position	Event	Result
Representing the United States
2014	World Junior Championships	Eugene, United States	6th	Decathlon	7760 pts
2015	Pan American U20 Championships	Edmonton, Canada	1st	Decathlon	8037 pts
2019	World Championships	Doha, Qatar	14th	Decathlon	7892 pts
2023	World Championships	Budapest, Hungary	7th	Decathlon	8500 pts
2024	World Indoor Championships	Glasgow, Scotland	—	Heptathlon	DNF
2024	Olympic Games	Paris, France	7th	Decathlon	8538 pts
2025	World Indoor Championships	Nanjing, China	—	Heptathlon	DNF
2025	World Championships	Tokyo, Japan	7th	Decathlon	8269 pts

== Personal bests ==
Information from World Athletics profile unless otherwise noted.

=== Outdoor ===
As of June 19, 2025

Event	Performance	Location	Date	Points
Decathlon	—N/a	Eugene	July 6–7, 2023	8,630 points
100 meters	10.54 (+1.4 m/s)	Walnut	April 12, 2023	966 points
Long jump	7.70 m (25 ft 3 in) (+1.3 m/s)	Chula Vista	April 24, 2021	985 points
Shot put	15.66 m (51 ft 4 1/2 in)	Paris	August 2, 2024	830 points
High jump	2.03 m (6 ft 7 3/4 in)	Murfreesboro	May 23, 2014	831 points
400 meters	46.35	Eugene	July 6, 2023	991 points
110 meters hurdles	13.88 (+1.5 m/s)	Palo Alto	May 1, 2016	990 points
Discus throw	48.86 m (160 ft 3 1/2 in)	Chula Vista	April 25, 2021	847 points
Pole vault	5.40 m (17 ft 8 1/2 in)	Chula Vista	April 30, 2023	1,035 points
Javelin throw	59.39 m (194 ft 10 in)	Eugene	June 22, 2024	729 points
1500 meters	4:19.58	Paris	August 3, 2024	814 points
Virtual Best Performance				9,018 points

=== Indoor ===
As of June 19, 2025

Event	Performance	Location	Date	Points
Heptathlon	—N/a	Birmingham	March 8–9, 2019	6,042 points
60 meters	6.90	Nanjing	March 22, 2025	918 points
Long jump	7.35 m (24 ft 1 1/4 in)	Birmingham	March 8, 2019	898 points
Shot put	15.49 m (50 ft 9 3/4 in)	Nanjing	March 22, 2025	820 points
High jump	2.03 m (6 ft 7 3/4 in)	Birmingham	March 8, 2019	831 points
60 meters hurdles	8.10 m (26 ft 6 3/4 in)	Seattle	January 12, 2019	957 points
Pole vault	5.40 m (17 ft 8 1/2 in)	Seattle	January 14, 2017	1,035 points
1000 meters	2:39.45	College Station	March 11, 2017	880 points
Virtual Best Performance				6,339 points

== Personal life ==
Williams attended Memphis University School, where he competed in track & field. He graduated from Stanford University with a B.S. in Product Design in 2019.
